= 2017–18 FC Anzhi Makhachkala season =

Anzhi Makhachkala
2017–18 season
- Manager: Aleksandr Grigoryan (until 13 August 2017); Vadim Skripchenko (from 14 August 2017)
- Stadium: Anzhi-Arena
- Russian Premier League: 14th (lost in relegation play-offs vs. Yenisey Krasnoyarsk)
- Russian Cup: Round of 32 (vs. Luch-Energiya Vladivostok)
- Top goalscorer: League: Juan Lescano (5); All: Juan Lescano (5)
Home colours	Away colours	Third colours

The 2017–18 FC Anzhi Makhachkala season was the club's third season back in the Russian Premier League, the highest tier of football in Russia, since their relegation at the end of the 2013–14 season.

== Season events ==
On 13 August 2017, Aleksandr Grigoryan resigned from his role as manager, with Vadim Skripchenko being appointed as Anzhi's new manager the following day.

== Squad ==
As of 15 March 2018

Note: Flags indicate national team as defined under FIFA eligibility rules; some limited exceptions apply. Players may hold more than one non-FIFA nationality.

No.	Pos.	Nation	Player
1	GK	RUS	Vladimir Sugrobov
2	DF	RUS	Guram Tetrashvili
3	DF	RUS	Vladimir Poluyakhtov
4	DF	UKR	Ihor Chaykovskyi
5	DF	RUS	Magomed Musalov
6	MF	ROU	Paul Anton
7	MF	UZB	Dostonbek Khamdamov
8	MF	RUS	Arsen Khubulov
9	FW	UKR	Pylyp Budkivskyi (loan from Shakhtar Donetsk)
10	MF	GHA	Kwadwo Poku
14	DF	MDA	Igor Armaș
17	DF	VEN	Jhon Chancellor
19	FW	RUS	Pavel Dolgov
37	MF	RUS	Batraz Khadartsev
47	GK	GEO	Giorgi Loria (loan from Krylia Sovetov)

No.	Pos.	Nation	Player
49	FW	RUS	Aleksandr Prudnikov
52	DF	SLO	Miral Samardžić
74	FW	RUS	Ivan Ivanchenko
77	DF	RUS	Islam Zhilov
78	MF	RUS	Mikhail Bakayev
82	MF	RUS	Nikita Andreyev
88	FW	RUS	Ivan Markelov
90	FW	RUS	Amur Kalmykov
91	FW	RUS	Pavel Yakovlev
92	DF	RUS	Sergei Bryzgalov
94	DF	UKR	Oleh Danchenko (loan from Shakhtar Donetsk)
95	DF	RUS	Magomed Elmurzayev
98	GK	RUS	Aleksandr Budakov
99	FW	ARG	Juan Lescano

=== Out on loan ===
Note: Flags indicate national team as defined under FIFA eligibility rules; some limited exceptions apply. Players may hold more than one non-FIFA nationality.

No.	Pos.	Nation	Player
—	DF	RUS	Anton Belov (at Zorky Krasnogorsk)
—	DF	RUS	Igor Udaly (at Orenburg)
—	MF	RUS	Pavel Karasyov (at SKA-Khabarovsk)

No.	Pos.	Nation	Player
—	FW	RUS	Aleksandr Bataev (at Chernomorets Novorossiysk)
—	FW	RUS	Dzhamal Dibirgadzhiyev (at Veles Moscow)

=== Anzhi-2 Makhachkala ===
Note: Flags indicate national team as defined under FIFA eligibility rules; some limited exceptions apply. Players may hold more than one non-FIFA nationality.

No.	Pos.	Nation	Player
20	MF	RUS	Tamirlan Dzhamalutdinov
34	GK	RUS	Nikita Repin
61	DF	RUS	Anton Belov
70	MF	RUS	Chingiz Agabalayev
80	MF	RUS	Tamerlan Ramazanov
86	MF	RUS	Rustam Khalimbekov
95	DF	RUS	Magomed Elmurzayev
96	FW	RUS	Dzhamal Dibirgadzhiyev
97	MF	RUS	Magomed Magomedov
—	GK	RUS	Aslan Dzekoyev
—	GK	RUS	Khadzhimurad Gadzhiyev
—	GK	RUS	Yuri Shleyev
—	DF	RUS	Dzhambulat Abdulkadyrov

No.	Pos.	Nation	Player
—	MF	RUS	Gadzhi Adzhiyev
—	MF	RUS	Omargadzhi Alibekov
—	MF	RUS	Shakhban Gaydarov
—	MF	RUS	Anvar Gazimagomedov
—	MF	RUS	Karim Girayev
—	MF	RUS	Ibragim Katinovasov
—	MF	RUS	Zaur Pirakhmedov
—	MF	RUS	Aleksey Shishkin
—	FW	RUS	Said Aliyev
—	FW	RUS	Pavel Dolgov
—	FW	RUS	Rashid Magomed
—	FW	RUS	Tagir Musalov
—	FW	RUS	Raul Shikhayev

== Transfers ==
=== Summer ===
In: Note: Flags indicate national team as defined under FIFA eligibility rules; some limited exceptions apply. Players may hold more than one non-FIFA nationality.

No.	Pos.	Nation	Player
1	GK	RUS	Aleksei Solosin (from (Russia) Tom Tomsk)
3	DF	RUS	Vladimir Poluyakhtov (from (Russia) Orenburg)
4	DF	UKR	Ihor Chaykovskyi (from (Ukraine) Zorya Luhansk)
6	MF	RUS	Pavel Karasyov (from (Russia) SKA-Khabarovsk)
7	MF	RUS	Adlan Katsayev (loan extended from (Russia) Akhmat Grozny)
9	FW	RUS	Konstantin Bazelyuk (loan from (Russia) CSKA Moscow)
10	MF	GEO	Jaba Lipartia (from (Ukraine) Zorya Luhansk)
14	DF	MDA	Igor Armaș (from (Russia) Kuban Krasnodar)
21	DF	RUS	Alan Bagayev (from (Russia) Mordovia Saransk)
24	DF	RUS	Dzhambolat Bolatov
25	MF	ETH	Gatoch Panom (from (Ethiopia) Ethiopian Coffee)
29	MF	UZB	Vadim Afonin (from (Russia) Orenburg)
30	MF	RUS	Ramazan Kerimov
31	DF	RUS	Nikita Chistyakov
32	MF	RUS	Muslim Shikhbabayev
33	DF	RUS	Igor Udaly (from (Russia) Tyumen)
35	DF	RUS	Mukhtar Khanmurzayev
36	FW	RUS	Raul Shikhayev
38	MF	RUS	Anar Panayev (from own academy)
39	GK	RUS	Timur Magomedov
41	MF	RUS	Anvar Gazimagomedov (from (Russia) Armavir)
47	GK	GEO	Giorgi Loria (on loan from (Russia) Krylia Sovetov Samara)
48	MF	RUS	Aleksandr Bataev (from (Greece) PAOK)
51	MF	RUS	Aleksey Shishkin
52	DF	SLO	Miral Samardžić (from (Turkey) Akhisar Belediyespor)
63	DF	RUS	Yarakhmed Makhmudov
69	GK	RUS	Maksim Bogatyryov (from (Russia) Lokomotiv Moscow)
75	MF	RUS	Zaur Pirakhmedov
77	MF	RUS	Ayaz Guliyev (loan extended from (Russia) Spartak Moscow)
78	MF	RUS	Mikhail Bakayev (from (Kazakhstan) Kairat)
85	MF	RUS	Zikrula Magomedov
88	FW	RUS	Ivan Markelov (from (Russia) Dynamo Moscow)
94	DF	UKR	Oleh Danchenko (loan from (Ukraine) Shakhtar Donetsk)
96	FW	RUS	Dzhamal Dibirgadzhiyev (end of loan to (Portugal) Fátima)
97	FW	RUS	Khasan Mamtov (from (Russia) Tyumen)
98	GK	RUS	Aleksandr Budakov (from (Russia) Amkar Perm)
99	FW	ARG	Juan Lescano (from (Russia) SKA-Khabarovsk)

Out: Note: Flags indicate national team as defined under FIFA eligibility rules; some limited exceptions apply. Players may hold more than one non-FIFA nationality.

No.	Pos.	Nation	Player
1	GK	ARM	David Yurchenko (to (Russia) Tosno)
4	DF	UKR	Maksym Bilyi
5	DF	RUS	Aleksandr Zhirov (end of loan from (Russia) Krasnodar)
6	MF	IRI	Saeid Ezatolahi (end of loan from (Russia) Rostov)
6	MF	RUS	Pavel Karasyov (on loan to (Russia) SKA-Khabarovsk)
7	DF	RUS	Kamil Agalarov
9	FW	RUS	Shamil Asildarov
13	MF	RUS	Dmitri Kudryashov
14	DF	RUS	Aslan Dudiyev (to (Russia) Tosno)
15	MF	UKR	Dmytro Shcherbak
16	GK	RUS	Yury Shafinsky (to (Russia) Tom Tomsk)
17	MF	RUS	Svyatoslav Georgiyevsky
21	MF	RUS	Maksim Batov (to (Russia) Khimki)
22	MF	RUS	Sergey Karetnik
24	DF	RUS	Sergei Parshivlyuk (to (Russia) Rostov)
26	DF	BRA	Xandão (to (Spain) Sporting Gijón)
28	FW	UKR	Pylyp Budkivskyi (end of loan from (Ukraine) Shakhtar Donetsk)
30	DF	RUS	Shamil Gasanov (to (Norway) Tromsø)
33	DF	RUS	Igor Udaly (on loan to (Russia) Orenburg)
49	MF	RUS	Yuri Kuzmin
53	MF	RUS	Karim Girayev (to (Russia) Anzhi-2 Makhachkala)
59	DF	RUS	Mariz Saidov (to (Russia) Anzhi-Yunior Zelenodolsk)
62	MF	RUS	Shakhban Gaydarov (to (Russia) Anzhi-2 Makhachkala)
67	MF	RUS	Alan Yarikbayev (to (Russia) Anzhi-2 Makhachkala)
68	MF	RUS	Roman Khodakovsky (to (Russia) KAMAZ Naberezhnye Chelny)
69	MF	RUS	Yegor Sedov
70	FW	RUS	Rashid Magomedov (to (Russia) Anzhi-2 Makhachkala)
73	MF	RUS	Chingiz Agabalayev (to (Russia) Anzhi-2 Makhachkala)
78	MF	RUS	Timur Patakhov (to (Russia) Anzhi-2 Makhachkala)
79	FW	RUS	Said Aliyev (to (Russia) Anzhi-2 Makhachkala)
80	MF	RUS	Tamerlan Ramazanov (to (Russia) Anzhi-2 Makhachkala)
83	MF	RUS	Gadzhi Adzhiyev (to (Russia) Anzhi-2 Makhachkala)
85	GK	RUS	Aleksandr Filtsov (end of loan from (Russia) Rubin Kazan)
90	MF	RUS	Andrei Lyakh
94	FW	CRC	Felicio Brown Forbes (end of loan from (Russia) Arsenal Tula)
95	DF	RUS	Magomed Elmurzayev (to (Russia) Anzhi-2 Makhachkala)
97	MF	RUS	Magomed Magomedov (to (Russia) Anzhi-2 Makhachkala)
97	FW	RUS	Khasan Mamtov (to (Russia) Orenburg)
—	DF	MDA	Valeriu Ciupercă (released, was on loan to (Russia) Tom Tomsk)
—	DF	RUS	Anton Belov (to (Russia) Anzhi-2 Makhachkala, previously on loan to (Russia) Zenit Penza)
—	DF	RUS	Georgi Tigiyev (to (Russia) Spartak Moscow, previously on loan)

=== Winter ===
In: Note: Flags indicate national team as defined under FIFA eligibility rules; some limited exceptions apply. Players may hold more than one non-FIFA nationality.

No.	Pos.	Nation	Player
1	GK	RUS	Vladimir Sugrobov (from (Russia) Ararat Moscow)
6	MF	ROU	Paul Anton (from (Romania) Dinamo București)
7	MF	UZB	Dostonbek Khamdamov (from (Uzbekistan) Bunyodkor)
9	FW	UKR	Pylyp Budkivskyi (on loan from (Ukraine) Shakhtar Donetsk)
10	MF	GHA	Kwadwo Poku (from (United States) Miami)
17	DF	VEN	Jhon Chancellor (from (Ecuador) Delfín)
20	FW	RUS	Artyom Sukhanov
34	GK	RUS	Nikita Repin (from (Russia) Anzhi-2 Makhachkala)
35	MF	RUS	Marat Abulashev
37	MF	RUS	Islam Khalimbekov
40	MF	RUS	Shikhamir Isayev
41	MF	RUS	Razhab Magomedov
46	MF	RUS	Sultan Isalov
48	MF	RUS	Mutaalim Magomedov
53	DF	RUS	Shamil Abdurazakov (from own academy)
54	FW	RUS	Bagand Bagandov
56	MF	RUS	Sergei Babkin (from own academy)
58	MF	RUS	Magomednur Isayev
59	MF	RUS	Mariz Saidov (from (Russia) Anzhi-Yunior Zelenodolsk)
61	DF	RUS	Dmitri Rashchektayev
62	MF	RUS	Valentin Andyamov
64	GK	RUS	Khadzhimurad Gadzhiyev (from (Russia) Anzhi-2 Makhachkala)
65	DF	RUS	Viktor Khugayev (from (Russia) Chertanovo-M Moscow)
67	DF	RUS	Sanislav Karakoz (from (Russia) Chertanovo Moscow)
77	DF	RUS	Islam Zhilov (from (Russia) Spartak Nalchik)
82	MF	RUS	Nikita Andreyev (from (Russia) Zenit St. Petersburg)
83	FW	RUS	Semyon Belyakov (from (Russia) Dynamo Moscow)
90	FW	RUS	Amur Kalmykov (from (Russia) Afips Afipsky)

Out: Note: Flags indicate national team as defined under FIFA eligibility rules; some limited exceptions apply. Players may hold more than one non-FIFA nationality.

No.	Pos.	Nation	Player
7	MF	RUS	Adlan Katsayev (loan return to (Russia) Akhmat Grozny)
9	FW	RUS	Konstantin Bazelyuk (loan return to (Russia) CSKA Moscow)
17	MF	RUS	Gadzhi Adzhiyev
18	DF	RUS	Dmitri Dontsov
20	MF	RUS	Tamirlan Dzhamalutdinov
26	GK	RUS	Yuri Shleyev
27	FW	RUS	Tagir Musalov
29	MF	UZB	Vadim Afonin (to (Russia) Orenburg)
41	MF	RUS	Anvar Gazimagomedov
48	MF	RUS	Aleksandr Bataev (on loan to (Russia) Chernomorets Novorossiysk)
61	DF	RUS	Anton Belov (on loan to (Russia) Zorky Krasnogorsk)
77	MF	RUS	Ayaz Guliyev (end of loan from (Russia) Spartak Moscow)
87	MF	RUS	Magomed Magomedov
90	FW	RUS	Rashid Magomedov (to (Russia) Legion-Dynamo Makhachkala)
93	MF	RUS	Karim Girayev (to (Russia) Legion-Dynamo Makhachkala)
96	FW	RUS	Dzhamal Dibirgadzhiyev (on loan to (Russia) Veles Moscow)

=== Released ===
Date	Position	Nationality	Name	Joined	Date
14 December 2017	GK	(Russia)	Aleksei Solosin	Kolkheti-1913 Poti	
14 December 2017	DF	(Russia)	Alan Bagayev	Mordovia Saransk	
14 December 2017	MF	(Ethiopia)	Gatoch Panom	Mekelle City	
16 January 2018	DF	(France)	Thomas Phibel	Palanga	2019
25 January 2018	MF	(Georgia (country))	Jaba Lipartia	Torpedo Kutaisi	25 February 2018

== Friendlies ==
25 June 2017	Astra Giurgiu (Romania)	1 – 2	(Russia) Anzhi Makhachkala	Slovenia
MSK (UTC+3)	Nicoară 79'	Report	Khubulov 35'; Phibel 60'

27 June 2017	CFR Cluj (Romania)	1 – 1	(Russia) Anzhi Makhachkala	Slovenia
MSK (UTC+3)	Goal	Report	Phibel 73'

28 June 2017	Istra 1961 (Croatia)	1 – 1	(Russia) Anzhi Makhachkala	Slovenia
MSK (UTC+3)	Goal	Report	Dibirgadzhiyev 38'

2 July 2017	Krško (Slovenia)	0 – 0	(Russia) Anzhi Makhachkala	Slovenia
MSK (UTC+3)		Report

4 July 2017	Nyíregyháza Spartacus (Hungary)	3 – 2	(Russia) Anzhi Makhachkala	Slovenia
MSK (UTC+3)	Goal	Report	Markelov; Dibirgadzhiyev

5 July 2017	Dinamo București (Romania)	0 – 1	(Russia) Anzhi Makhachkala	Slovenia
MSK (UTC+3)			Bazelyuk 85'

== Competitions ==
=== Russian Premier League ===
==== Results by round ====
Round	1	2	3	4	5	6	7	8	9	10	11	12	13	14	15	16	17	18	19	20	21	22	23	24	25	26	27	28	29	30
Ground	H	H	A	H	A	H	A	H	A	H	A	H	A	H	H	A	H	A	H	A	H	A	H	A	H	A	H	A	H	A
Result	L	W	L	L	L	L	L	W	D	L	D	D	L	W	D	W	L	L	W	L	D	L	W	D	L	L	L	L	L	L
Position	12	8	11	13	15	15	15	14	15	16	16	16	16	15	15	14	15	15	15	15	15	15	13	14	14	14	14	14	14	14

Updated to match(es) played on 13 May 2018. Source: See Results
A = Away; H = Home; W = Win; D = Draw; L = Loss

==== Results ====
15 July 2017 1	Anzhi Makhachkala	1 – 3	CSKA Moscow	Kaspiysk
20:00 MSK (UTC+3)	Yakovlev (yellow card) 41'; Markelov 64'; Poluyakhtov (yellow card) 74'; Danchenko (yellow card) 90+1'	Report	Vasin 21'; Golovin 49' (yellow card) 90+3'; Natkho 79' (pen.)	Stadium: Anzhi Arena; Attendance: 9,400; Referee: Vladimir Seldyakov

21 July 2017 2	Anzhi Makhachkala	1 – 0	Amkar Perm	Kaspiysk
19:30 MSK (UTC+3)	Bryzgalov (yellow card) 11' (goal) 23'; Poluyakhtov (yellow card) 45'	Report	Gigolayev (yellow card) 39'; Sivakow (yellow card) 46'; Condé (yellow card) 75'; Salugin (yellow card) 85'; Kostyukov (yellow card) 89'	Stadium: Anzhi Arena; Attendance: 6,207; Referee: Vladislav Bezborodov

30 July 2017 3	Lokomotiv Moscow	1 – 0	Anzhi Makhachkala	Moscow
17:30 MSK (UTC+3)	Tarasov (yellow card) 43'; Fernandes (yellow card) 77' (goal) 81'; Kvirkvelia (yellow card) 86'	Report	Phibel (yellow card) 90+3'	Stadium: Lokomotiv Stadium; Attendance: 7,603; Referee: Roman Galimov

4 August 2017 4	Anzhi Makhachkala	0 – 1	Rostov	Kaspiysk
20:00 MSK (UTC+3)	Yakovlev (yellow card) 32'; Markelov (yellow card) 42'; Musalov (yellow card) 62'	Report	Dyadyun 19'; Ustinov (yellow card) 34'; Gațcan (yellow card) 46'; Pesyakov (yellow card) 88'; Mogilevets (yellow card) 90+2'	Stadium: Anzhi Arena; Attendance: 5,690; Referee: Igor Fedotov

8 August 2017 5	SKA-Khabarovsk	2 – 0	Anzhi Makhachkala	Khabarovsk
11:00 MSK (UTC+3)	Ediyev (yellow card) 57'; Marković 68'; Dovbnya (yellow card) 88'; Kalinsky 90+4'	Report	Phibel (yellow card) 90+2'	Stadium: Lenin Stadium; Attendance: 8,100; Referee: Aleksei Matyunin

12 August 2017 6	Anzhi Makhachkala	1 – 3	Dynamo Moscow	Kaspiysk
20:00 MSK (UTC+3)	Yakovlev 9'; Khubulov (yellow card) 24'	Report	Bećiraj 15'; Panchenko 34', 76' (pen.); Sow (yellow card) 59'; Rykov (yellow card) 85'	Stadium: Anzhi Arena; Attendance: 5,339; Referee: Mikhail Vilkov

19 August 2017 7	Rubin Kazan	6 – 0	Anzhi Makhachkala	Kazan
20:00 MSK (UTC+3)	Jonathas 4', 31'; Karadeniz 15'; Bauer (yellow card) 60'; Nabiullin 62'; M'Vila 85'; Lestienne 86'	Report	Bagayev (yellow card) 10'	Stadium: Kazan Arena; Attendance: 11,252; Referee: Sergei Karasev

25 August 2017 8	Anzhi Makhachkala	1 – 0	Ufa	Kaspiysk
20:00 MSK (UTC+3)	Lescano 18' (yellow card) 90+3'; Markelov (yellow card) 51'	Report	Jokić (yellow card) 45+1'; Sysuyev (yellow card) 69'	Stadium: Anzhi Arena; Attendance: 4,100; Referee: Aleksei Nikolaev

9 September 2017 9	Tosno	2 – 2	Anzhi Makhachkala	Saint Petersburg
14:00 MSK (UTC+3)	Markov 5'; Galiulin 63'; Poletanović (yellow card) 80'	Report	Prudnikov 18'; Danchenko 25'	Stadium: Petrovsky Stadium; Attendance: 3,547; Referee: Aleksei Eskov

16 September 2017 10	Anzhi Makhachkala	1 – 5	Krasnodar	Kaspiysk
19:00 MSK (UTC+3)	Poluyakhtov 77'; Markelov (yellow card) 88'	Report	Smolov 39'; Claesson 55'; Wanderson 67', 71'; Okriashvili 79'	Stadium: Anzhi Arena; Attendance: 4,550; Referee: Evgeny Turbin

23 September 2017 11	Spartak Moscow	2 – 2	Anzhi Makhachkala	Moscow
19:00 MSK (UTC+3)	Luiz Adriano 14' (pen.); Dzhikiya (yellow card) 84'; Melgarejo 90+2'	Report	Poluyakhtov (yellow card) 55'; Samardžić 74'; Katsayev 78'	Stadium: Otkrytiye Arena; Attendance: 25,075; Referee: Vitaly Meshkov

1 October 2017 12	Anzhi Makhachkala	2 – 2	Zenit St.Petersburg	Kaspiysk
19:00 MSK (UTC+3)	Phibel (yellow card) 13'; Danchenko 20' (yellow card) 81'; Markelov (yellow card) 23'; Katsayev 59'	Report	Kranevitter (yellow card) 36'; Kokorin 57'; Paredes 85' (yellow card) 90+4'; Rigoni (yellow card) 90+3'	Stadium: Anzhi Arena; Attendance: 5,150; Referee: Aleksei Matyunin

14 October 2017 13	Ural Yekaterinburg	2 – 1	Anzhi Makhachkala	Yekaterinburg
16:30 MSK (UTC+3)	Haroyan (yellow card) 49'; Bicfalvi 56'; Kulakov (yellow card) 69'; Glushkov (yellow card) 82'; Ilyin 87'; Hodzyur (yellow card) 90+2'	Report	Yakovlev (yellow card) 57'; Khubulov (yellow card) 67'; Tetrashvili (yellow card) 69'; Bryzgalov 89'	Stadium: SKB-Bank Arena; Attendance: 3,609; Referee: Roman Galimov

22 October 2017 14	Anzhi Makhachkala	3 – 2	Arsenal Tula	Kaspiysk
19:00 MSK (UTC+3)	Gabulov 7' (o.g.); Khubulov 49' (pen.); Guliyev 64'; Samardžić (yellow card) 83'	Report	Tkachyov 40' (yellow card) 77'; Đorđević 65'; Kombarov (yellow card) 90+4'	Stadium: Anzhi Arena; Attendance: 3,850; Referee: Vladislav Bezborodov

30 October 2017 15	Akhmat Grozny	1 – 1	Anzhi Makhachkala	Grozny
19:30 MSK (UTC+3)	Berisha (yellow card) 77'; Ángel 90+3'; Mbengue (yellow card) 90+6'	Report	Bryzgalov (yellow card) 87'; Yakovlev (yellow card) 87' (goal) 90+6'	Stadium: Akhmat-Arena; Attendance: 16,372; Referee: Sergey Karasev

5 November 2017 16	Amkar Perm	1 – 2	Anzhi Makhachkala	Perm
14:00 MSK (UTC+3)	Kostyukov 12' (yellow card) 34'; Condé (yellow card) 41'; Bodul (yellow card) 51'; Idowu (yellow card) 57'; Gashchenkov (yellow card) 73'	Report	Markelov 6', 28' (yellow card) 21' (yellow-red card) 63'; Tetrashvili (yellow card) 78'; Katsayev (yellow card) 84'	Stadium: Zvezda Stadium; Attendance: 4,200; Referee: Vladimir Moskalyov

19 November 2017 17	Anzhi Makhachkala	0 – 1	Lokomotiv Moscow	Kaspiysk
14:00 MSK (UTC+3)		Report	Al.Miranchuk 43'	Stadium: Anzhi Arena; Attendance: 5,495; Referee: Aleksey Sukhoy

26 November 2017 18	Rostov	2 – 0	Anzhi Makhachkala	Rostov-on-Don
16:30 MSK (UTC+3)	Majer (yellow card) 30'; Bukharov 44' (pen.), 58'; Gațcan (yellow card) 81'; Ingason (yellow card) 90+1'	Report	Lescano (yellow card) 90+1'	Stadium: Olimp-2; Attendance: 4,252; Referee: Mikhail Vilkov

3 December 2017 19	Anzhi Makhachkala	4 – 0	SKA-Khabarovsk	Kaspiysk
19:00 MSK (UTC+3)	Lescano 1'; Poluyakhtov 8'; Markelov 43'; Armaș 85'	Report	Krivoruchko (red card) 26'	Stadium: Anzhi Arena; Attendance: 3,100; Referee: Aleksey Eskov

9 December 2017 20	Dynamo Moscow	2 – 0	Anzhi Makhachkala	Khimki
14:00 MSK (UTC+3)	Tashayev 8'; Lutsenko 60'	Report		Stadium: Arena Khimki; Attendance: 3,525; Referee: Sergey Lapochkin

2 March 2018 21	Anzhi Makhachkala	1 – 1	Rubin Kazan	Kaspiysk
19:30 MSK (UTC+3)	Tetrashvili (yellow card) 33'; Budkivskyi (yellow card) 64'; Samardžić (yellow card) 80'; Lescano 90+1'	Report	Kambolov (yellow card) 18'; Popov 36'; Mogilevets (yellow card) 37'; Kuzmin (yellow card) 55'; Noboa (yellow card) 77'	Stadium: Anzhi Arena; Attendance: 4,500; Referee: Aleksey Eskov

10 March 2018 22	Ufa	3 – 2	Anzhi Makhachkala	Ufa
16:00 MSK (UTC+3)	Jokić (yellow card) 45+1' (goal) 67'; Nikitin 57'; Paurević 65'; Seidakhmet (yellow card) 83'; Belenov (yellow card) 90+1'	Report	Anton (yellow card) 56'; Lescano 64'; Poluyakhtov 81'; Samardžić (yellow card) 83'	Stadium: Neftyanik Stadium; Attendance: 5,386; Referee: Vladislav Bezborodov

17 March 2018 23	Anzhi Makhachkala	2 – 0	Tosno	Kaspiysk
19:00 MSK (UTC+3)	Anton 17', 43'	Report	Makarov (yellow card) 48'	Stadium: Anzhi Arena; Attendance: 10,200; Referee: Sergey Ivanov

1 April 2018 24	Krasnodar	1 – 1	Anzhi Makhachkala	Krasnodar
19:00 MSK (UTC+3)	Claesson 33'; Kaboré (yellow card) 45+1'; Pereyra (yellow card) 82'	Report	Samardžić (yellow card) 64'; Poluyakhtov (yellow card) 71'; Danchenko 90+4'	Stadium: Krasnodar Stadium; Attendance: 20,160; Referee: Aleksey Eskov

8 April 2018 25	Anzhi Makhachkala	1 – 4	Spartak Moscow	Kaspiysk
19:00 MSK (UTC+3)	Lescano 36'	Report	Promes 10', 14', 27' (pen.); Kutepov 56'	Stadium: Anzhi Arena; Attendance: 7,764; Referee: Sergey Lapochkin

14 April 2018 26	Zenit St.Petersburg	1 – 0	Anzhi Makhachkala	Saint Petersburg
16:30 MSK (UTC+3)	Driussi 36'; Smolnikov (yellow card) 39'; Criscito (yellow card) 52'; Lodygin (yellow card) 86'	Report	Khubulov (yellow card) 44'	Stadium: Krestovsky Stadium; Attendance: 38,048; Referee: Aleksei Matyunin

21 April 2018 27	Anzhi Makhachkala	0 – 1	Ural Yekaterinburg	Kaspiysk
19:00 MSK (UTC+3)	Samardžić (yellow card) 11'; Markelov (yellow card) 57'; Kalmykov (yellow card) 90'	Report	Haroyan (yellow card) 28'; El Kabir (yellow card) 37'; Yemelyanov (yellow card) 40'; Bicfalvi 84'	Stadium: Anzhi Arena; Attendance: 9,500; Referee: Kirill Levnikov

28 April 2018 28	Arsenal Tula	2 – 1	Anzhi Makhachkala	Tula
19:30 MSK (UTC+3)	Berkhamov 16'; Sunzu 62'; Kangwa (yellow card) 88'; Adzhoyev (yellow card) 90+4'	Report	Khubulov 22'; Samardžić (yellow card) 59'; Danchenko (yellow card) 73'; Armaș (yellow card) 86'	Stadium: Arsenal Stadium; Attendance: 11,200; Referee: Sergey Karasev

7 May 2018 29	Anzhi Makhachkala	0 – 2	Akhmat Grozny	Kaspiysk
19:30 MSK (UTC+3)	Tetrashvili (yellow card) 37' (yellow-red card) 62'; Poluyakhtov (yellow card) 45'; Samardžić (yellow card) 90+3'	Report	Rodolfo 18'; Berisha (yellow card) 41'; Roshi (yellow card) 68' (goal) 87'; Mbengue (yellow card) 76'; Semyonov (yellow card) 81'; Shvets (yellow card) 86'	Stadium: Anzhi Arena; Attendance: 10,990; Referee: Evgeny Turbin

13 May 2018 30	CSKA Moscow	2 – 1	Anzhi Makhachkala	Moscow
14:00 MSK (UTC+3)	Musa 9'; Nababkin (yellow card) 32'; Vitinho 61'; Golovin (yellow card) 68'	Report	Khubulov 33'; Danchenko (yellow card) 68'; Anton (yellow card) 90'	Stadium: VEB Arena; Attendance: 25,916; Referee: Sergey Lapochkin

==== League table ====
Pos	Team	Pld	W	D	L	GF	GA	GD	Pts	Qualification or relegation
12	Ural Yekaterinburg	30	8	13	9	31	32	−1	37 (Note: Head-to-head: Rostov 1–0 Ural, Ural 1–1 Rostov)	
13	Amkar Perm (D)	30	9	8	13	20	30	−10	35	Dissolved after the season (Note: On 13 June 2018, FC Amkar Perm announced that the Russian Football Union recalled their 2018–19 season license, making them ineligible for the Russian Premier League or Russian Football National League. On 18 June 2018, club president Gennadi Shilov announced that the club will not register for the third-tier Russian Professional Football League and will be dissolved. As a consequence, Anzhi Makhachkala was not relegated.)
14	Anzhi Makhachkala	30	6	6	18	31	55	−24	24 (Note: Head-to-head: Anzhi 2–0 Tosno, Tosno 2–2 Anzhi)	Qualification for the Relegation play-offs
15	Tosno (D)	30	6	6	18	23	54	−31	24	Dissolved after the season (Note: On 30 May 2018, Russian Football National League announced that FC Tosno failed in its appeal to obtain the FNL license for the 2018–19 season. On 9 June 2018, the founder of FORT Group (the company that owned the team), Maxim Levchenko, announced that the team is officially dissolved.)
16	SKA-Khabarovsk (R)	30	2	7	21	16	55	−39	13	Relegation to Football National League

Updated to match(es) played on 13 May 2018. Source: Russian Premier League, Soccerway
Rules for classification: 1) Points; 2) Head-to-head points; 3) Head-to-head matches won; 4) Head-to-head goal difference; 5) Head-to-head goals scored; 6) Head-to-head away goals; 7) Matches won; 8) Goal difference; 9) Goals scored; 10) Away goals scored.
(D) Dissolved after the season; (R) Relegated

==== Relegation play-offs ====
17 May 2018 1st Leg	Yenisey Krasnoyarsk	3 – 0	Anzhi Makhachkala	Krasnoyarsk
15:00 MSK (UTC+3)	Kutyin 25' (pen.), 58'; Sarkisov 32'; Filippov (yellow card) 77'; Zhirov (yellow card) 81'; Chicherin (yellow card) 87'	Report	Poluyakhtov (yellow card) 41'; Khubulov (yellow card) 50'; Markelov (yellow card) 59'	Stadium: Indoor Arena; Attendance: 3,000; Referee: Mikhail Vilkov

20 May 2018 2nd Leg	Anzhi Makhachkala	4 – 3 (4 – 6 agg.)	Yenisey Krasnoyarsk	Kaspiysk
21:00 MSK (UTC+3)	Anton (yellow card) 18'; Poku 45+2'; Kalmykov 73'; Poluyakhtov 74', 90+3'; Bakayev (yellow card) 90+5'	Report	Obradović 15'; Semakin 17'; Kichin (yellow card) 20'; Serderov 84' (pen.)	Stadium: Anzhi Arena; Attendance: 6,100; Referee: Kirill Levnikov

=== Russian Cup ===
20 September 2017 Round of 32	Luch-Energiya Vladivostok	2 – 0	Anzhi Makhachkala	Vladivostok
12:00 MSK (UTC+3)	Gordiyenko 20'; Malyaka 68' (yellow card) 73'	Report	Khalimbekov (yellow card) 30'; Dibirgadzhiyev (yellow card) 58'	Stadium: Dynamo Stadium; Attendance: 1,950; Referee: Anton Anopa

== Squad statistics ==
As of Match played 20 May 2018

=== Appearances and goals ===
No.	Pos	Nat	Player	Total		Premier League		Russian Cup		Playoff	
No.	Pos	Nat	Player	Apps	Goals	Apps	Goals	Apps	Goals	Apps	Goals
1	GK	(Russia) RUS	Vladimir Sugrobov	2	0	0	0	0	0	1+1	0
2	DF	(Russia) RUS	Guram Tetrashvili	24	0	22	0	0	0	2	0
3	DF	(Russia) RUS	Vladimir Poluyakhtov	29	5	26+1	3	0	0	2	2
4	DF	(Ukraine) UKR	Ihor Chaykovskyi	1	0	1	0	0	0	0	0
5	DF	(Russia) RUS	Magomed Musalov	14	0	12+1	0	0	0	1	0
6	MF	(Romania) ROU	Paul Anton	11	2	9	2	0	0	2	0
7	MF	(Uzbekistan) UZB	Dostonbek Khamdamov	4	0	3+1	0	0	0	0	0
8	MF	(Russia) RUS	Arsen Khubulov	26	3	16+9	3	0	0	1	0
9	FW	(Ukraine) UKR	Pylyp Budkivskyi	9	0	4+3	0	0	0	1+1	0
10	MF	(Ghana) GHA	Kwadwo Poku	4	1	3	0	0	0	1	1
13	MF	(Russia) RUS	Danil Glebov	1	0	0	0	0	0	0+1	0
14	DF	(Moldova) MDA	Igor Armaș	15	1	12+1	1	0	0	2	0
17	DF	(Venezuela) VEN	Jhon Chancellor	1	0	1	0	0	0	0	0
19	FW	(Russia) RUS	Pavel Dolgov	5	0	1+4	0	0	0	0	0
20	MF	(Russia) RUS	Tamirlan Dzhamalutdinov	1	0	0	0	1	0	0	0
26	GK	(Russia) RUS	Yuri Shleyev	1	0	0	0	1	0	0	0
27	FW	(Russia) RUS	Tagir Musalov	1	0	0	0	0+1	0	0	0
37	MF	(Russia) RUS	Batraz Khadartsev	1	0	0	0	1	0	0	0
41	MF	(Russia) RUS	Anvar Gazimagomedov	1	0	0	0	1	0	0	0
47	GK	(Georgia (country)) GEO	Giorgi Loria	13	0	13	0	0	0	0	0
49	FW	(Russia) RUS	Aleksandr Prudnikov	20	1	13+6	1	0	0	1	0
52	DF	(Slovenia) SLO	Miral Samardžić	21	1	19	1	0	0	2	0
61	DF	(Russia) RUS	Anton Belov	1	0	0	0	1	0	0	0
70	MF	(Russia) RUS	Chingiz Agabalayev	1	0	0	0	0+1	0	0	0
74	FW	(Russia) RUS	Ivan Ivanchenko	3	0	1+2	0	0	0	0	0
78	MF	(Russia) RUS	Mikhail Bakayev	17	0	13+3	0	0	0	1	0
80	MF	(Russia) RUS	Tamerlan Ramazanov	1	0	0	0	0+1	0	0	0
86	MF	(Russia) RUS	Rustam Khalimbekov	1	0	0	0	1	0	0	0
88	FW	(Russia) RUS	Ivan Markelov	28	4	24+2	4	0	0	2	0
90	FW	(Russia) RUS	Amur Kalmykov	7	1	0+6	0	0	0	0+1	1
91	FW	(Russia) RUS	Pavel Yakovlev	22	2	15+6	2	0	0	0+1	0
92	DF	(Russia) RUS	Sergei Bryzgalov	25	2	24+1	2	0	0	0	0
94	MF	(Ukraine) UKR	Oleh Danchenko	29	3	26+2	3	0	0	1	0
95	DF	(Russia) RUS	Magomed Elmurzayev	4	0	0+3	0	1	0	0	0
96	FW	(Russia) RUS	Dzhamal Dibirgadzhiyev	3	0	0+2	0	1	0	0	0
97	MF	(Russia) RUS	Magomed Magomedov	1	0	0	0	1	0	0	0
98	GK	(Russia) RUS	Aleksandr Budakov	12	0	10+1	0	0	0	1	0
99	FW	(Argentina) ARG	Juan Lescano	19	5	11+6	5	0	0	1+1	0
Players away from the club on loan:
6	MF	(Russia) RUS	Pavel Karasyov	4	0	4	0	0	0	0	0
Players who left Anzhi Makhachkala during the season:
1	GK	(Russia) RUS	Aleksei Solosin	7	0	7	0	0	0	0	0
7	MF	(Russia) RUS	Adlan Katsayev	13	2	5+8	2	0	0	0	0
9	FW	(Russia) RUS	Konstantin Bazelyuk	6	0	2+4	0	0	0	0	0
10	MF	(Georgia (country)) GEO	Jaba Lipartia	7	0	2+4	0	1	0	0	0
21	DF	(Russia) RUS	Alan Bagayev	1	0	1	0	0	0	0	0
25	MF	(Ethiopia) ETH	Gatoch Panom	1	0	0	0	1	0	0	0
29	MF	(Uzbekistan) UZB	Vadim Afonin	14	0	13+1	0	0	0	0	0
45	DF	(France) FRA	Thomas Phibel	9	0	9	0	0	0	0	0
77	MF	(Russia) RUS	Ayaz Guliyev	11	1	4+7	1	0	0	0	0
97	FW	(Russia) RUS	Khasan Mamtov	6	0	3+3	0	0	0	0	0

=== Goal scorers ===
Place	Position	Nation	Number	Name	Premier League	Russian Cup	Playoff	Total
1	FW	(Argentina)	99	Juan Lescano	5	0	0	5
1	DF	(Russia)	3	Vladimir Poluyakhtov	3	0	2	5
3	FW	(Russia)	88	Ivan Markelov	4	0	0	4
4	MF	(Ukraine)	94	Oleh Danchenko	3	0	0	3
4	MF	(Russia)	8	Arsen Khubulov	3	0	0	3
6	MF	(Russia)	7	Adlan Katsayev	3	0	0	3
6	DF	(Russia)	92	Sergei Bryzgalov	2	0	0	2
6	FW	(Russia)	91	Pavel Yakovlev	2	0	0	2
6	MF	(Romania)	6	Paul Anton	2	0	0	2
10	FW	(Russia)	49	Aleksandr Prudnikov	1	0	0	1
10	DF	(Slovenia)	52	Miral Samardžić	1	0	0	1
10	MF	(Russia)	77	Ayaz Guliyev	1	0	0	1
10	DF	(Moldova)	14	Igor Armaș	1	0	0	1
10	MF	(Ghana)	10	Kwadwo Poku	0	0	1	1
10	FW	(Russia)	90	Amur Kalmykov	0	0	1	1
10				Own goal	1	0	0	1
				TOTALS	31	0	4	35

=== Disciplinary record ===
Number	Nation	Position	Name	Premier League		Russian Cup		Playoff		Total	
Number	Nation	Position	Name	Yellow card	Red card	Yellow card	Red card	Yellow card	Red card	Yellow card	Red card
2	(Russia)	DF	Guram Tetrashvili	5	1	0	0	0	0	5	1
3	(Russia)	DF	Vladimir Poluyakhtov	5	0	0	0	1	0	6	0
5	(Russia)	DF	Magomed Musalov	1	0	0	0	0	0	1	0
6	(Romania)	MF	Paul Anton	2	0	0	0	1	0	3	0
8	(Russia)	MF	Arsen Khubulov	3	0	0	0	1	0	4	0
9	(Ukraine)	FW	Pylyp Budkivskyi	1	0	0	0	0	0	1	0
14	(Moldova)	DF	Igor Armaș	1	0	0	0	0	0	1	0
52	(Slovenia)	DF	Miral Samardžić	9	0	0	0	0	0	9	0
78	(Russia)	MF	Mikhail Bakayev	0	0	0	0	1	0	1	0
86	(Russia)	MF	Rustam Khalimbekov	0	0	1	0	0	0	1	0
88	(Russia)	FW	Ivan Markelov	7	1	0	0	1	0	8	1
90	(Russia)	FW	Amur Kalmykov	1	0	0	0	0	0	1	0
91	(Russia)	FW	Pavel Yakovlev	4	0	0	0	0	0	4	0
92	(Russia)	DF	Sergei Bryzgalov	2	0	0	0	0	0	2	0
94	(Ukraine)	MF	Oleh Danchenko	4	0	0	0	0	0	4	0
96	(Russia)	FW	Dzhamal Dibirgadzhiyev	0	0	1	0	0	0	1	0
99	(Argentina)	FW	Juan Lescano	2	0	0	0	0	0	2	0
Players who left Anzhi Makhachkala during the season:
7	(Russia)	MF	Adlan Katsayev	1	0	0	0	0	0	1	0
21	(Russia)	DF	Alan Bagayev	1	0	0	0	0	0	1	0
45	(France)	DF	Thomas Phibel	3	0	0	0	0	0	3	0
			TOTALS	50	2	2	0	5	0	57	2
