= List of Russian football transfers winter 2017–18 =

This is a list of Russian football transfers in the 2017–18 winter transfer window by club. Only clubs of the 2017–18 Russian Premier League are included. It includes transfers that happened before the window transfer window was opened and after the summer 2017 window closed.

== Russian Premier League 2017–18 ==
=== Akhmat Grozny ===
In: Note: Flags indicate national team as defined under FIFA eligibility rules; some limited exceptions apply. Players may hold more than one non-FIFA nationality.

No.	Pos.	Nation	Player
22	MF	RUS	Adlan Katsayev (end of loan to Anzhi Makhachkala)
31	GK	RUS	Aleksandr Sheplyakov (on loan from CRFSO Smolensk)
38	DF	RUS	Nikita Karmayev
39	MF	RUS	Said-Akhmed Tsatiyev
66	DF	RUS	Mursalin Denilkanov
69	MF	RUS	Ilya Moseychuk
75	MF	RUS	Khamzat Gabanukayev
84	MF	RUS	Magomed-Emi Khakiyev
87	MF	RUS	Lechi Sadulayev
88	MF	RUS	Askhab Chunchurov
90	FW	RUS	Islam Alsultanov
97	GK	RUS	Ramzan Mutuskhanov
98	MF	RUS	Chingiz Magomadov (end of loan to Spartak Nalchik)

Out: Note: Flags indicate national team as defined under FIFA eligibility rules; some limited exceptions apply. Players may hold more than one non-FIFA nationality.

No.	Pos.	Nation	Player
38	FW	RUS	Magomed Abdureshedov
39	FW	RUS	Ali Khusainov
49	FW	RUS	Khalid Ismailov
66	MF	RUS	Beslan Adamov
84	MF	RUS	Turpal-Ali Malsagov
87	MF	RUS	Shamsudin Masayev
88	MF	RUS	Islam Ediyev
97	GK	RUS	Khamzat Nasurov
—	DF	RUS	Idris Musluyev (on loan to Angusht Nazran, previously on loan to Spartak Nalchik)
—	DF	RUS	Khalid Shakhtiyev (to Chayka Peschanokopskoye, previously on loan to Spartak Nalchik)
—	MF	ROU	Gabriel Torje (on loan to (Romania) Dinamo București, previously on loan to (Turkey) Karabükspor)

=== Amkar Perm ===
In: Note: Flags indicate national team as defined under FIFA eligibility rules; some limited exceptions apply. Players may hold more than one non-FIFA nationality.

No.	Pos.	Nation	Player
13	DF	RUS	Kirill Suslov (from (Norway) Kongsvinger)
33	MF	RUS	Daniil Zuyev (from Rubin Yalta)
40	FW	RUS	Daniil Uldanov
80	FW	NGA	Aaron Olanare (on loan from CSKA Moscow)
88	DF	RUS	Aleksandr Bakharev

Out: Note: Flags indicate national team as defined under FIFA eligibility rules; some limited exceptions apply. Players may hold more than one non-FIFA nationality.

No.	Pos.	Nation	Player
21	MF	RUS	Vasili Aleynikov (on loan to Tom Tomsk)
23	FW	MNE	Drago Milović
30	DF	RUS	Rustam Vazitdinov (on loan to (Armenia) Alashkert)
59	MF	RUS	Yevgeni Paramonov
63	GK	RUS	Daniil Arzhevitin
80	MF	RUS	Andrei Trunin

=== Anzhi Makhachkala ===
In: Note: Flags indicate national team as defined under FIFA eligibility rules; some limited exceptions apply. Players may hold more than one non-FIFA nationality.

No.	Pos.	Nation	Player
1	GK	RUS	Vladimir Sugrobov (from Ararat Moscow)
6	MF	ROU	Paul Anton (from (Romania) Dinamo București)
7	MF	UZB	Dostonbek Khamdamov (from (Uzbekistan) Bunyodkor)
9	FW	UKR	Pylyp Budkivskyi (on loan from (Ukraine) Shakhtar Donetsk)
10	MF	GHA	Kwadwo Poku (from (United States) Miami)
13	MF	RUS	Danil Glebov
17	DF	VEN	Jhon Chancellor (from (Ecuador) Delfín)
20	FW	RUS	Artyom Sukhanov
25	FW	RUS	Salam Dzhanbekov
34	GK	RUS	Nikita Repin (from Anzhi-2 Makhachkala)
35	MF	RUS	Marat Abulashev
37	MF	RUS	Islam Khalimbekov
40	MF	RUS	Shikhamir Isayev
41	MF	RUS	Razhab Magomedov
46	MF	RUS	Sultan Isalov
48	MF	RUS	Mutaalim Magomedov
53	DF	RUS	Shamil Abdurazakov (from own academy)
54	FW	RUS	Bagand Bagandov
56	MF	RUS	Sergei Babkin (from own academy)
58	MF	RUS	Magomednur Isayev
59	MF	RUS	Mariz Saidov (from Anzhi-Yunior Zelenodolsk)
61	DF	RUS	Dmitri Rashchektayev
62	MF	RUS	Valentin Andyamov
64	GK	RUS	Khadzhimurad Gadzhiyev (from Anzhi-2 Makhachkala)
65	DF	RUS	Viktor Khugayev (from Chertanovo-M Moscow)
67	DF	RUS	Sanislav Karakoz (from Chertanovo Moscow)
77	DF	RUS	Islam Zhilov (from Spartak Nalchik)
82	MF	RUS	Nikita Andreyev (from Zenit St. Petersburg)
83	FW	RUS	Semyon Belyakov (from Dynamo Moscow)
90	FW	RUS	Amur Kalmykov (from Afips Afipsky)

Out: Note: Flags indicate national team as defined under FIFA eligibility rules; some limited exceptions apply. Players may hold more than one non-FIFA nationality.

No.	Pos.	Nation	Player
1	GK	RUS	Aleksei Solosin (to (Georgia (country)) Kolkheti-1913 Poti)
7	MF	RUS	Adlan Katsayev (end of loan from Akhmat Grozny)
9	FW	RUS	Konstantin Bazelyuk (loan return to CSKA Moscow)
10	MF	GEO	Jaba Lipartia (to (Georgia (country)) Torpedo Kutaisi)
17	MF	RUS	Gadzhi Adzhiyev
18	DF	RUS	Dmitri Dontsov
19	MF	RUS	Pavel Dolgov (on loan to (Belarus) Torpedo-BelAZ Zhodino)
20	MF	RUS	Tamirlan Dzhamalutdinov
21	DF	RUS	Alan Bagayev
25	MF	ETH	Gatoch Panom (to (Ethiopia) Mekelle Kenema)
26	GK	RUS	Yuri Shleyev (to Ararat Moscow)
27	FW	RUS	Tagir Musalov
29	MF	UZB	Vadim Afonin (to Orenburg)
37	MF	RUS	Batraz Khadartsev (to (Georgia (country)) Rustavi)
41	MF	RUS	Anvar Gazimagomedov (on loan to Legion-Dynamo Makhachkala)
45	DF	FRA	Thomas Phibel
48	MF	RUS	Aleksandr Bataev (on loan to Chernomorets Novorossiysk)
61	DF	RUS	Anton Belov (on loan to Zorky Krasnogorsk)
77	MF	RUS	Ayaz Guliyev (end of loan from Spartak Moscow)
87	MF	RUS	Magomed Magomedov
90	FW	RUS	Rashid Magomedov (to Legion-Dynamo Makhachkala)
93	MF	RUS	Karim Girayev (to Legion-Dynamo Makhachkala)
96	FW	RUS	Dzhamal Dibirgadzhiyev (on loan to Veles Moscow)

=== Arsenal Tula ===
In: Note: Flags indicate national team as defined under FIFA eligibility rules; some limited exceptions apply. Players may hold more than one non-FIFA nationality.

No.	Pos.	Nation	Player
1	GK	RUS	Igor Obukhov (on loan from Zenit Saint Petersburg)
15	MF	CIV	Habib Maïga (on loan from (France) Saint-Étienne)
24	FW	RUS	Artem Dzyuba (on loan from Zenit Saint Petersburg)
37	DF	RUS	Aleksei Rodinkov
44	GK	RUS	Daniil Barinov (from Lokomotiv Moscow)
49	DF	RUS	Nikita Melnikov (from Anzhi-Yunior Zelenodolsk)
52	DF	RUS	Ivan Novoseltsev (on loan from Zenit Saint Petersburg)
74	MF	RUS	Eduard Sholokh (from Lokomotiv Moscow)
78	MF	RUS	Bogdan Petosh
92	MF	RUS	Sergei Svitlik

Out: Note: Flags indicate national team as defined under FIFA eligibility rules; some limited exceptions apply. Players may hold more than one non-FIFA nationality.

No.	Pos.	Nation	Player
30	GK	RUS	Vladimir Gabulov (to (Belgium) Club Brugge)
40	DF	RUS	Pavel Borisov
41	DF	RUS	Dmitri Doronin (to Saturn Ramenskoye)
54	MF	RUS	Osman Isayev
68	FW	RUS	Nikita Melnikov (to Strogino Moscow)
81	MF	RUS	Vladimir Kabakhidze
86	DF	RUS	Rustam Normatov

=== CSKA Moscow ===
In: Note: Flags indicate national team as defined under FIFA eligibility rules; some limited exceptions apply. Players may hold more than one non-FIFA nationality.

No.	Pos.	Nation	Player
7	MF	NGA	Ahmed Musa (on loan from (England) Leicester City)
25	MF	CRO	Kristijan Bistrović (from (Croatia) Slaven Belupo)
49	DF	RUS	Ivan Zakharov
68	FW	RUS	Roman Pukhov
85	FW	RUS	Danila Yanov (from Strogino Moscow)
87	MF	RUS	Konstantin Maradishvili (from own academy)
91	FW	RUS	Artyom Popov (on loan from Khimki)

Out: Note: Flags indicate national team as defined under FIFA eligibility rules; some limited exceptions apply. Players may hold more than one non-FIFA nationality.

No.	Pos.	Nation	Player
31	MF	RUS	Aleksandr Makarov (on loan to Tosno)
60	DF	RUS	Savely Kozlov (to Tyumen)
68	FW	RUS	Roman Pukhov (to Dynamo Moscow)
98	DF	RUS	Danil Neplyuyev
99	FW	NGA	Aaron Olanare (on loan to Amkar Perm)
—	FW	SWE	Alibek Aliev (to (Sweden) Örgryte, previously on loan to (Sweden) GAIS)
—	FW	RUS	Konstantin Bazelyuk (loan to (Czech Republic) Zbrojovka Brno, previously on loan to Anzhi Makhachkala)

=== Dynamo Moscow ===
In: Note: Flags indicate national team as defined under FIFA eligibility rules; some limited exceptions apply. Players may hold more than one non-FIFA nationality.

No.	Pos.	Nation	Player
5	MF	GHA	Abdul Aziz Tetteh (from (Poland) Lech Poznań)
7	FW	RUS	Yevgeni Markov (from Tosno)
13	FW	LTU	Fiodor Černych (from (Poland) Jagiellonia Białystok)
34	DF	RUS	Konstantin Rausch (from (Germany) 1. FC Köln)
51	DF	RUS	Kirill Glushchenkov
58	MF	RUS	Artyom Gorbunov
81	FW	RUS	Timur Melekestsev
82	MF	RUS	Andrei Mazurin
83	MF	RUS	Igor Shkolik
84	MF	RUS	Aleksei Usanov
85	DF	RUS	Dmitri Vladimirov
86	DF	RUS	Yuri Nesov
87	MF	RUS	Valentin Zekhov
89	GK	RUS	Vladislav Yarukov
98	FW	RUS	Roman Pukhov (from CSKA Moscow)

Out: Note: Flags indicate national team as defined under FIFA eligibility rules; some limited exceptions apply. Players may hold more than one non-FIFA nationality.

No.	Pos.	Nation	Player
6	MF	SEN	Khaly Thiam (end of loan from (Hungary) MTK Budapest)
9	FW	RUS	Pavel Pogrebnyak (to Tosno)
13	DF	RUS	Sergei Terekhov (to Orenburg)
14	MF	BRA	Wánderson (to (Turkey) Alanyaspor)
21	FW	MNE	Fatos Bećiraj (to (Belgium) Mechelen)
22	DF	RUS	Maksim Nenakhov (on loan to Tyumen)
41	MF	RUS	Aleksandr Sapeta (to Rostov)
42	GK	RUS	Sergei Narubin
59	DF	RUS	Daniil Yermolin
69	FW	RUS	Semyon Belyakov (to Anzhi Makhachkala)
96	MF	RUS	Maksim Kuzmin (on loan to Fakel Voronezh)
—	MF	RUS	Ilya Petrov (to (Portugal) União de Leiria, previously on loan to Avangard Kursk)

=== Krasnodar ===
In: Note: Flags indicate national team as defined under FIFA eligibility rules; some limited exceptions apply. Players may hold more than one non-FIFA nationality.

No.	Pos.	Nation	Player
13	DF	RUS	Ihor Kalinin (from Volgar Astrakhan)
18	MF	RUS	Oleg Shatov (on loan from Zenit St. Petersburg)
32	DF	RUS	Dmitri Pivovarov
42	FW	RUS	Nikita Shershnyov
49	DF	RUS	Danila Vedernikov
59	MF	RUS	Mikhail Kolomiytsev
69	DF	RUS	Mamma Mammayev
74	MF	RUS	Eduard Spertsyan
89	FW	RUS	Ruslan Apekov

Out: Note: Flags indicate national team as defined under FIFA eligibility rules; some limited exceptions apply. Players may hold more than one non-FIFA nationality.

No.	Pos.	Nation	Player
5	DF	RUS	Aleksandr Zhirov (to Yenisey Krasnoyarsk)
11	MF	RUS	Vyacheslav Podberyozkin (on loan to Rubin Kazan)
15	MF	RUS	Ilya Zhigulyov (on loan to Tosno)
27	MF	SRB	Mihailo Ristić (on loan to (Czech Republic) Sparta Prague)
42	DF	RUS	Dmitri Bubenin
56	FW	RUS	Ilya Belous (on loan to Afips Afipsky)
64	MF	RUS	Aleksandr Morgunov (on loan to Afips Afipsky)
78	FW	RUS	Dmitri Vorobyov (on loan to Afips Afipsky)
79	DF	RUS	Yevgeni Nesterenko (on loan to Chayka Peschanokopskoye)
89	FW	RUS	Aleksandr Ageyev
91	DF	RUS	Leo Goglichidze (on loan to Olimpiyets Nizhny Novgorod)
95	FW	RUS	Araik Ovsepyan
—	DF	RUS	Aleksandr Marchenko (released, previously on loan to Luch-Energiya Vladivostok)
—	MF	RUS	Ilya Borisov (released, previously on loan to Chayka Peschanokopskoye)

=== Lokomotiv Moscow ===
In: Note: Flags indicate national team as defined under FIFA eligibility rules; some limited exceptions apply. Players may hold more than one non-FIFA nationality.

No.	Pos.	Nation	Player
26	DF	RUS	Leonid Furtsev (from Lada-Togliatti)
35	MF	RUS	Aleksei Lomakin
40	MF	RUS	Nikita Glushkov
45	DF	RUS	Stanislav Utkin (from Zenit St. Petersburg)
51	GK	RUS	Vitali Botnar
66	MF	RUS	Ruslan Kul

Out: Note: Flags indicate national team as defined under FIFA eligibility rules; some limited exceptions apply. Players may hold more than one non-FIFA nationality.

No.	Pos.	Nation	Player
34	DF	RUS	Timofei Margasov (on loan to Tosno)
87	GK	RUS	Daniil Barinov (to Arsenal Tula)
93	DF	RUS	Eduard Sholokh (to Arsenal Tula)

=== Rostov ===
In: Note: Flags indicate national team as defined under FIFA eligibility rules; some limited exceptions apply. Players may hold more than one non-FIFA nationality.

No.	Pos.	Nation	Player
6	DF	ISL	Ragnar Sigurðsson (from (England) Fulham)
8	MF	RUS	Ayaz Guliyev (on loan from Spartak Moscow)
9	FW	ISL	Björn Bergmann Sigurðarson (from (Norway) Molde)
21	MF	RUS	Aleksandr Sapeta (from Dynamo Moscow)
23	MF	MDA	Valeriu Ciupercă (from Baltika Kaliningrad)
33	DF	RUS	Konstantin Pliyev (from Volgar Astrakhan)
63	DF	RUS	Aleksandr Zakharov
76	MF	RUS	Elvin Talibov
77	MF	RUS	Dmitri Skopintsev (end of loan to Baltika Kaliningrad)
78	DF	RUS	Roman Petrov
82	MF	RUS	Nikita Kryukov

Out: Note: Flags indicate national team as defined under FIFA eligibility rules; some limited exceptions apply. Players may hold more than one non-FIFA nationality.

No.	Pos.	Nation	Player
8	MF	RUS	Igor Kireyev (to Avangard Kursk)
9	MF	RUS	Valeri Yaroshenko
11	FW	RUS	Aleksandr Bukharov
18	MF	RUS	Pavel Mogilevets (to Rubin Kazan)
44	MF	ECU	Josimar Quintero (end of loan from (England) Chelsea)
62	GK	RUS	Artyom Yesaulenko (to Chayka Peschanokopskoye)
91	DF	RUS	Vitali Ustinov (end of loan from Rubin Kazan)
94	DF	RUS	Igor Cherkasov

=== Rubin Kazan ===
In: Note: Flags indicate national team as defined under FIFA eligibility rules; some limited exceptions apply. Players may hold more than one non-FIFA nationality.

No.	Pos.	Nation	Player
7	MF	RUS	Vyacheslav Podberyozkin (on loan from Krasnodar)
15	MF	RUS	Igor Konovalov (from Kuban Krasnodar)
19	DF	RUS	Vitali Ustinov (end of loan to Rostov)
18	MF	RUS	Pavel Mogilevets (from Rostov)
26	MF	ROU	Gabriel Enache (from (Romania) Steaua București)
41	DF	RUS	Vladislav Mikushin
49	MF	RUS	Aleksandr Tsiberkin (from own academy)
43	DF	RUS	Grigori Ziganshin (from Krasnodar-3)
50	DF	RUS	Rail Abdullin
51	DF	RUS	Ilya Agapov
58	MF	RUS	Timur Lobanov
59	MF	RUS	Nikita Makarov
60	DF	RUS	Amir Nurullin
63	FW	RUS	Nikita Saprunov
65	FW	RUS	Artur Sagitov
66	MF	ECU	Christian Noboa (on loan from Zenit St. Petersburg)
67	DF	RUS	Aleksandr Smelov
69	DF	RUS	Danil Stepanov
71	FW	BUL	Ivelin Popov (on loan from Spartak Moscow)
72	FW	RUS	Nikita Tsygankov
75	MF	RUS	Nikita Torgashov (end of loan to Neftekhimik Nizhnekamsk)

Out: Note: Flags indicate national team as defined under FIFA eligibility rules; some limited exceptions apply. Players may hold more than one non-FIFA nationality.

No.	Pos.	Nation	Player
3	DF	RUS	Elmir Nabiullin (to Zenit St. Petersburg)
4	MF	FRA	Yann M'Vila (to (France) Saint-Étienne)
5	DF	ISL	Ragnar Sigurðsson (end of loan from (England) Fulham)
8	MF	CMR	Alex Song
9	FW	RUS	Maksim Kanunnikov (to SKA-Khabarovsk)
10	MF	BEL	Maxime Lestienne (on loan to (Spain) Málaga)
20	MF	CRO	Mijo Caktaš (to (Croatia) Hajduk Split)
21	FW	ESP	Rubén Rochina (on loan to (Spain) Levante)
23	DF	AUT	Moritz Bauer (to (England) Stoke City)
27	MF	RUS	Magomed Ozdoyev (to Zenit St. Petersburg)
28	GK	RUS	Aleksandr Filtsov
29	MF	RUS	Ruslan Shcherbin (on loan to KAMAZ Naberezhnye Chelny)
45	FW	RUS	Kamil Mullin (to Tyumen)
46	MF	RUS	Albert Sharipov
70	MF	RUS	Georgi Makhatadze (on loan to SKA-Khabarovsk)
90	DF	RUS	Taras Burlak (to Krylia Sovetov Samara)
91	GK	RUS	Yuri Nesterenko (to Yenisey Krasnoyarsk)
—	DF	PER	Carlos Zambrano (to (Ukraine) Dynamo Kyiv, not registered with the Russian Premier League for the 2017–18 season)

=== SKA-Khabarovsk ===
In: Note: Flags indicate national team as defined under FIFA eligibility rules; some limited exceptions apply. Players may hold more than one non-FIFA nationality.

No.	Pos.	Nation	Player
2	MF	RUS	Sergei Makarov (free agent)
4	DF	SRB	Nemanja Tubić (from (Serbia) Napredak Kruševac)
8	DF	NGA	Dele Adeleye (free agent)
14	MF	RUS	Dmitri Bogayev (on loan from Zenit St.Petersburg)
17	FW	RUS	Dmitri Kabutov (from Volgar Astrakhan)
20	FW	RUS	Maksim Kanunnikov (from Rubin Kazan)
21	MF	RUS	Artyom Samsonov (from Spartak Moscow)
22	FW	RUS	Kirill Kolesnichenko (from Chertanovo Moscow)
44	FW	POL	Łukasz Sekulski (from (Poland) Jagiellonia Białystok)
50	DF	RUS	Maksim Karpov (loan from Zenit St.Petersburg)
70	MF	RUS	Georgi Makhatadze (on loan from Rubin Kazan)
74	GK	RUS	Aleksandr Akishin (from Atom Novovoronezh)

Out: Note: Flags indicate national team as defined under FIFA eligibility rules; some limited exceptions apply. Players may hold more than one non-FIFA nationality.

No.	Pos.	Nation	Player
4	DF	RUS	Maksim Tishkin (to Baltika Kaliningrad)
8	MF	RUS	Georgy Gabulov (to (Georgia (country)) Rustavi)
20	FW	RUS	Nikita Dyachenko (to Smena Komsomolsk-na-Amure)
30	MF	RUS	Aleksei Druzin (to Rotor Volgograd)
69	MF	UKR	Denys Dedechko (to (Ukraine) Mariupol)
91	FW	BUL	Ventsislav Hristov (to (Bulgaria) Vereya)

=== Spartak Moscow ===
In: Note: Flags indicate national team as defined under FIFA eligibility rules; some limited exceptions apply. Players may hold more than one non-FIFA nationality.

No.	Pos.	Nation	Player
4	MF	RUS	Nikolai Tyunin (from Khimki)
30	MF	ALG	Sofiane Hanni (from (Belgium) Anderlecht)
33	DF	SRB	Nikola Maksimović (on loan from (Italy) Napoli)
45	MF	FIN	Sergei Eremenko (on loan from (Latvia) Spartaks Jūrmala)
48	GK	RUS	Daniil Yarusov

Out: Note: Flags indicate national team as defined under FIFA eligibility rules; some limited exceptions apply. Players may hold more than one non-FIFA nationality.

No.	Pos.	Nation	Player
21	MF	RUS	Artyom Samsonov (to SKA-Khabarovsk)
48	DF	RUS	Kirill Feofilaktov
71	FW	BUL	Ivelin Popov (on loan to Rubin Kazan)
—	MF	RUS	Ayaz Guliyev (on loan to Rostov, previously on loan to Anzhi Makhachkala)

=== Tosno ===
In: Note: Flags indicate national team as defined under FIFA eligibility rules; some limited exceptions apply. Players may hold more than one non-FIFA nationality.

No.	Pos.	Nation	Player
4	MF	RUS	Ilya Zhigulyov (on loan from Krasnodar)
5	DF	MNE	Nemanja Mijušković (from (Kazakhstan) Taraz)
19	MF	RUS	Aleksei Skvortsov (from Tambov)
24	DF	RUS	Timofei Margasov (on loan from Lokomotiv Moscow)
29	MF	BRA	Ricardinho (from (Serbia) Red Star Belgrade)
31	MF	RUS	Aleksandr Makarov (on loan from CSKA Moscow)
33	FW	RUS	Pavel Pogrebnyak (from Dynamo Moscow)

Out: Note: Flags indicate national team as defined under FIFA eligibility rules; some limited exceptions apply. Players may hold more than one non-FIFA nationality.

No.	Pos.	Nation	Player
13	DF	RUS	Vitali Shakhov (on loan to Baltika Kaliningrad)
17	FW	RUS	Anton Zabolotny (to Zenit St. Petersburg)
20	FW	RUS	Yevgeni Markov (to Dynamo Moscow)
57	DF	RUS	Ruslan Abazov (on loan to Rotor Volgograd)
62	MF	RUS	Vyacheslav Zinovyev
91	MF	RUS	Yan Kazayev (on loan to Tom Tomsk)
—	FW	CRO	Ante Vukušić (to (Poland) Olimpia Grudziądz)

=== Ufa ===
In: Note: Flags indicate national team as defined under FIFA eligibility rules; some limited exceptions apply. Players may hold more than one non-FIFA nationality.

No.	Pos.	Nation	Player
10	FW	KAZ	Yerkebulan Seidakhmet (from (Kazakhstan) Taraz)
27	DF	ROU	Ionuț Nedelcearu (from (Romania) Dinamo București)
52	GK	RUS	Rem Saitgareyev

Out: Note: Flags indicate national team as defined under FIFA eligibility rules; some limited exceptions apply. Players may hold more than one non-FIFA nationality.

No.	Pos.	Nation	Player
53	GK	RUS	Gleb Yefimov (to Zorky Krasnogorsk)
60	MF	RUS	Vladimir Zubarev (on loan to Khimki)
87	MF	RUS	Igor Bezdenezhnykh (on loan to Olimpiyets Nizhny Novgorod)
99	FW	RUS	Islamnur Abdulavov (on loan to Tom Tomsk)

=== Ural Yekaterinburg ===
In: Note: Flags indicate national team as defined under FIFA eligibility rules; some limited exceptions apply. Players may hold more than one non-FIFA nationality.

No.	Pos.	Nation	Player
21	MF	UKR	Dmytro Khomchenovskyi (from (Poland) Jagiellonia Białystok)
30	MF	RUS	Pavel Karpov
44	MF	RUS	Andrei Yegorychev (from Nosta Novotroitsk)
53	DF	RUS	Pavel Nedivomy
55	GK	RUS	Aleksandr Medvedev
58	MF	NED	Othman El Kabir (from (Sweden) Djurgården)
63	MF	RUS	Aleksei Gerasimov (end of loan to Tom Tomsk)
66	MF	RUS	Mingiyan Beveyev (from Nosta Novotroitsk)
72	MF	RUS	Lev Tolkachyov
74	MF	RUS	Denis Novikov
76	DF	RUS	Yegor Badyin
83	DF	RUS	Gleb Geykin
84	DF	RUS	Nikita Beskrovny
85	MF	RUS	Danil Davletshin
86	MF	RUS	Maksim Prokopyev
96	FW	RUS	Nikolai Sidorkin

Out: Note: Flags indicate national team as defined under FIFA eligibility rules; some limited exceptions apply. Players may hold more than one non-FIFA nationality.

No.	Pos.	Nation	Player
1	GK	RUS	Dmitri Arapov (on loan to Volgar Astrakhan)
8	MF	RUS	Aleksandr Pavlenko (to Tom Tomsk)
21	DF	RUS	Dmitri Borovkov (to Kvant Obninsk)
30	MF	RUS	Maksim Yashkin
37	DF	RUS	Kirill Karabanov
38	FW	RUS	Vladislav Blinov
51	MF	RUS	Volodya Israelyan
55	DF	RUS	Pavel Vlasenko
58	MF	UKR	Dmytro Bilonoh (to (Ukraine) Zirka Kropyvnytskyi)
74	DF	RUS	Aleksandr Kashkarov
82	MF	RUS	Sergei Podoksyonov (released, previously on loan to Zenit Penza)
90	MF	RUS	Aleksandr Scherbakov (on loan to (Armenia) Alashkert)
96	GK	RUS	Andrei Timofeyev (on loan to Syzran-2003)
—	MF	RUS	Sergei Serchenkov (on loan to (Armenia) Alashkert, previously on loan to Orenburg)

=== Zenit Saint Petersburg ===
In: Note: Flags indicate national team as defined under FIFA eligibility rules; some limited exceptions apply. Players may hold more than one non-FIFA nationality.

No.	Pos.	Nation	Player
15	DF	RUS	Elmir Nabiullin (from Rubin Kazan)
27	MF	RUS	Magomed Ozdoyev (from Rubin Kazan)
29	FW	RUS	Anton Zabolotny (from Tosno)
40	DF	RUS	Ilya Vakhaniya
45	MF	RUS	Dmitri Sergeyev
48	GK	RUS	Nodari Kalichava (from Lokomotiv Saint Petersburg)
50	DF	RUS	Vladislav Molchan
51	FW	RUS	Artyom Dyakonov
69	MF	RUS	Nikita Miroshnichenko
83	DF	RUS	Aleksandr Korotkov
87	DF	RUS	Danila Prokhin
88	MF	RUS	Vyacheslav Zinkov (on loan from Krylia Sovetov Samara)
90	FW	RUS	Ilya Grishchenko
95	GK	RUS	Aleksandr Vasyutin (end of loan to (Finland) Lahti)

Out: Note: Flags indicate national team as defined under FIFA eligibility rules; some limited exceptions apply. Players may hold more than one non-FIFA nationality.

No.	Pos.	Nation	Player
16	MF	ECU	Christian Noboa (on loan to Rubin Kazan)
17	MF	RUS	Oleg Shatov (on loan to Krasnodar)
22	FW	RUS	Artem Dzyuba (on loan to Arsenal Tula)
25	DF	RUS	Ivan Novoseltsev (on loan to Arsenal Tula)
40	MF	RUS	Konstantin Zyryanov (retired)
46	MF	RUS	Vitali Gorulyov (on loan to Volgar Astrakhan)
50	DF	RUS	Maksim Karpov (on loan to SKA-Khabarovsk)
51	GK	RUS	Maksim Rudakov (on loan to (Finland) HJK)
53	DF	RUS	Kirill Aloyan
67	MF	RUS	Nikita Andreyev (to Anzhi Makhachkala)
88	MF	RUS	Dmitri Bogayev (on loan to SKA-Khabarovsk)
90	DF	RUS	Stanislav Utkin (to Lokomotiv Moscow)
—	GK	RUS	Igor Obukhov (on loan to Arsenal Tula, previously on loan to Tyumen)
—	DF	RUS	Artyom Vyatkin (on loan to (Finland) Lahti, previously on loan to (Croatia) Novigrad)
