= Musalov =

Musalov is a surname. Notable people with the surname include:

- Magomed Musalov (born 1994), Russian-Azerbaijani footballer
- Tagir Musalov (born 1994), Russian-Azeri footballer
