= Tamerlan Ramazanov =

Russian footballer

Personal information
- Full name: Tamerlan Rakhmanovich Ramazanov
- Date of birth: 23 September 1997 (age 29)
- Place of birth: Alamishe, Dagestan, Russia
- Height: 1.80 m (5 ft 11 in)
- Position: Midfielder

Senior career*
| Years | Team | Apps | (Gls) |
| 2015–2018 | FC Anzhi Makhachkala | 0 | (0) |
| 2017–2018 | → FC Anzhi-2 Makhachkala | 25 | (1) |
- * Club domestic league appearances and goals

Tamerlan Rakhmanovich Ramazanov (Russian: Тамерлан Рахманович Рамазанов; born 23 September 1997) is a Russian former football player.

== Club career ==
He made his debut in the Russian Professional Football League for FC Anzhi-2 Makhachkala on 19 July 2017 in a game against FC Chernomorets Novorossiysk.

He made his debut for the main squad of FC Anzhi Makhachkala on 20 September 2017 in a Russian Cup game against FC Luch-Energiya Vladivostok.
