= Magomed Musalov =

Russian-Azerbaijani footballer

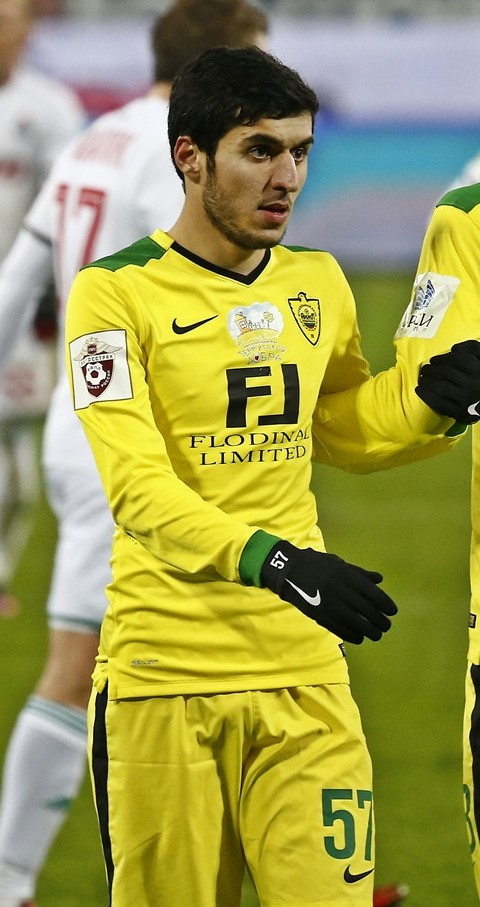
- Musalov with Anzhi Makhachkala in 2016

Personal information
- Full name: Magomed Akhmedovich Musalov
- Date of birth: 9 February 1994 (age 32)
- Place of birth: Khushtada, Russia
- Height: 1.80 m (5 ft 11 in)
- Position: Right-back

Team information
- Current team: Neftekhimik Nizhnekamsk
- Number: 5

Youth career
- LFK Rubin Kazan

Senior career*
Years	Team	Apps	(Gls)
2012–2019	Anzhi Makhachkala	52	(1)
2014–2015	→ Anzhi-2 Makhachkala	26	(3)
2018–2019	→ Akhmat Grozny (loan)	5	(0)
2019–2020	Akhmat Grozny	9	(0)
2020–2022	Pyunik	18	(0)
2022–2024	SKA-Khabarovsk	60	(4)
2024–2025	Chernomorets Novorossiysk	27	(1)
2025–	Neftekhimik Nizhnekamsk	18	(0)
- * Club domestic league appearances and goals as of 16 May 2026

Magomed Akhmedovich Musalov (Russian: Магомед Ахмедович Мусалов; born 9 February 1994) is a Russian-Azerbaijani football player who plays as a right back for Neftekhimik Nizhnekamsk.

== Career ==
=== Club ===
Musalov made his professional debut in the Russian Professional Football League for FC Anzhi-2 Makhachkala on 12 August 2014 in a game against FC Alania Vladikavkaz.

On 16 June 2018, Musalov joined FC Akhmat Grozny on loan until the end of the 2018–19 season. On 29 July 2020, Musalov left Akhmat Grozny. On 1 September 2020, Musalov joined Armenian club FC Pyunik. On 1 June 2022, Musalov left Pyunik after his contract expired.

=== International ===
In 2012, Musalov was involved with the Azerbaijan U19 team, but never made an appearance for them.

== Personal life ==
He is the twin brother of Tagir Musalov.

== Career statistics ==
=== Club ===
As of match played 23 September 2020

Club	Season	League			Cup		Continental		Other		Total	
Club	Season	Division	Apps	Goals	Apps	Goals	Apps	Goals	Apps	Goals	Apps	Goals
FC Anzhi Makhachkala	2012–13	Russian Premier League	0	0	0	0	0	0	–		0	0
FC Anzhi Makhachkala	2013–14	Russian Premier League	0	0	0	0	0	0	–		0	0
FC Anzhi Makhachkala	2014–15	FNL	1	0	0	0	–		–		1	0
FC Anzhi Makhachkala	2015–16	Russian Premier League	9	1	0	0	–		2 (Note: Two appearances in relegation play-offs)	0	11	1
FC Anzhi Makhachkala	2016–17	Russian Premier League	29	0	2	0	–		–		31	0
FC Anzhi Makhachkala	2017–18	Russian Premier League	13	0	0	0	–		1 (Note: One appearance in relegation play-offs)	0	14	0
FC Anzhi Makhachkala	2018–19	Russian Premier League	0	0	0	0	–		–		0	0
FC Anzhi Makhachkala	Total		52	1	2	0	0	0	3	0	57	1
Anzhi-2 Makhachkala	2014–15	PFL	26	3	–		–		–		26	3
Akhmat Grozny (loan)	2018–19	Russian Premier League	5	0	1	0	–		–		6	0
Akhmat Grozny	2019–20	Russian Premier League	9	0	2	0	–		–		11	0
Pyunik	2020–21	Armenian Premier League	4	0	1	0	–		–		5	0
Pyunik	2021–22	Armenian Premier League	14	0	1	0	–		–		15	0
Pyunik	Total		18	0	2	0	-	-	-	-	20	0
Career total			110	4	7	0	0	0	3	0	120	4

== Honours ==
Pyunik

- Armenian Premier League: 2021–22
