= Pavel Karasyov =

Russian footballer (born 1992)

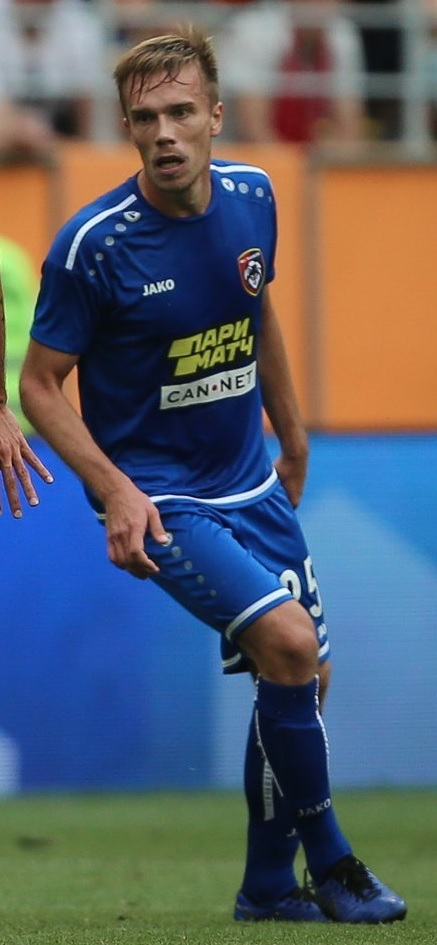
- Karasyov with FC Tambov in 2019

Personal information
- Full name: Pavel Sergeyevich Karasyov
- Date of birth: 10 July 1992 (age 34)
- Place of birth: Drezna, Orekhovo-Zuyevsky District, Moscow Oblast, Russia
- Height: 1.75 m (5 ft 9 in)
- Position: Midfielder

Youth career
- –2010: Lokomotiv Moscow

Senior career*
Years	Team	Apps	(Gls)
2011–2014	Lokomotiv-2 Moscow	84	(10)
2014–2015	Khimik Dzerzhinsk	29	(4)
2015–2017	SKA-Khabarovsk	61	(2)
2017–2019	Anzhi Makhachkala	4	(0)
2017–2019	→ SKA-Khabarovsk (loan)	47	(1)
2019–2020	Tambov	46	(1)
2021	BATE Borisov	27	(1)
2022	Pari NN	2	(0)
2022–2023	Rotor Volgograd	15	(0)
2023–2024	Veles Moscow	27	(0)
2024–2025	Irtysh Omsk	15	(0)
- * Club domestic league appearances and goals as of 15 June 2025

Pavel Sergeyevich Karasyov (Russian: Павел Серге́евич Карасёв; born 10 July 1992) is a Russian football player who plays as a central midfielder.

== Club career ==
He made his debut in the Russian Second Division for Lokomotiv-2 Moscow on 21 April 2011 in a game against Dynamo Kostroma.

He made his Russian Premier League debut for Anzhi Makhachkala on 15 July 2017 in a game against CSKA Moscow.

On 16 January 2022, he signed with Nizhny Novgorod. On 27 July 2022, Karasyov's contract was terminated by mutual consent.

== Career statistics ==
As of 21 May 2022

Club	Season	League			Cup		Continental		Other		Total	
Club	Season	Division	Apps	Goals	Apps	Goals	Apps	Goals	Apps	Goals	Apps	Goals
Lokomotiv-2 Moscow	2011–12	PFL	30	0	2	0	–		–		32	0
Lokomotiv-2 Moscow	2012–13	PFL	23	6	4	0	–		–		27	6
Lokomotiv-2 Moscow	2013–14	PFL	31	4	0	0	–		–		31	4
Lokomotiv-2 Moscow	Total		84	10	6	0	0	0	0	0	90	10
Khimik Dzerzhinsk	2014–15	FNL	29	4	1	0	–		–		30	4
SKA-Khabarovsk	2015–16	FNL	29	1	3	0	–		4 (Note: Appearances in the FNL Cup)	0	36	1
SKA-Khabarovsk	2016–17	FNL	32	1	2	0	–		6 (Note: One appearance in promotion play-offs, five appearances in the FNL Cup)	0	40	1
Anzhi Makhachkala	2017–18	RPL	4	0	–		–		–		4	0
SKA-Khabarovsk	2017–18	RPL	17	0	2	0	–		–		19	0
SKA-Khabarovsk	2018–19	FNL	30	1	2	0	–		–		32	1
SKA-Khabarovsk	Total		108	3	9	0	0	0	10	0	127	3
Tambov	2019–20	RPL	27	0	1	0	–		4	0	32	0
Tambov	2020–21	RPL	19	1	2	0	–		–		21	1
Tambov	Total		46	1	3	0	0	0	4	0	53	1
BATE Borisov	2021	BPL	27	1	3	0	2 (Note: Appearances in the UEFA Europa Conference League)	0	1 (Note: Appearance in the Belarusian Super Cup)	0	33	1
FC Nizhny Novgorod	2021–22	RPL	2	0	1	0	–		–		3	0
Career total			300	19	23	0	2	0	15	0	340	19
