= FC Anzhi =

FK Anzhi may refer to:

- FC Anzhi Makhachkala
- FC Anzhi-2 Makhachkala
- FC Anzhi Tallinn (it)
