= Pavel Yakovlev (footballer) =

Russian footballer

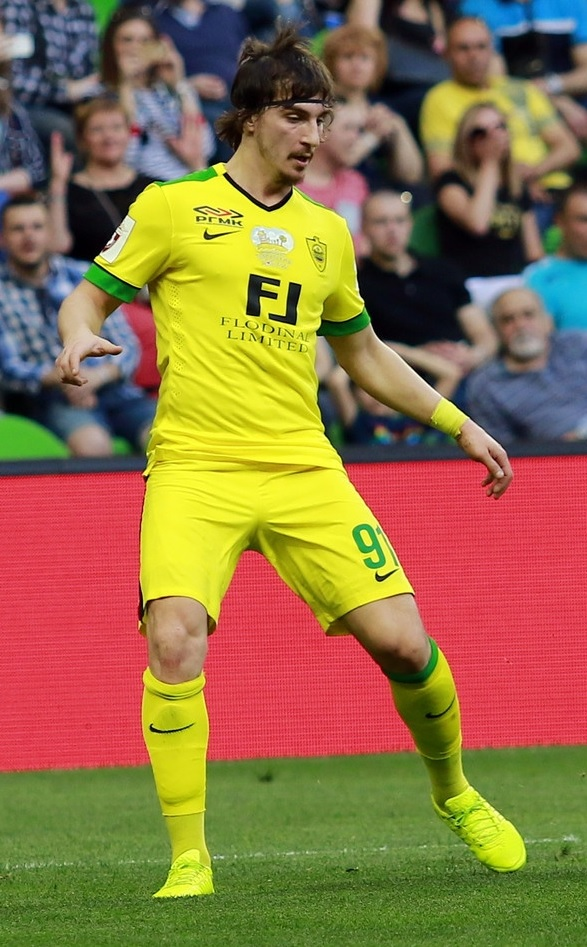
- Yakovlev with Anzhi in 2017

Personal information
- Full name: Pavel Vladimirovich Yakovlev
- Date of birth: 7 April 1991 (age 35)
- Place of birth: Lyubertsy, Russian SFSR
- Height: 1.80 m (5 ft 11 in)
- Position: Winger

Youth career
- 2007–2009: Spartak Moscow

Senior career*
Years	Team	Apps	(Gls)
2009–2016	Spartak Moscow	75	(10)
2010	→ Krylia Sovetov Samara (loan)	12	(4)
2011–2012	→ Krylia Sovetov Samara (loan)	24	(5)
2014	→ Spartak-2 Moscow	6	(2)
2015	→ Mordovia Saransk (loan)	11	(0)
2015–2016	→ Krylia Sovetov Samara (loan)	12	(1)
2016	→ Spartak-2 Moscow	9	(2)
2016–2018	Anzhi Makhachkala	35	(3)
2018–2019	Krylia Sovetov Samara	17	(1)
2019–2021	Fakel Voronezh	37	(2)
2021–2023	Kyzylzhar	22	(2)
2023	Yelimay Semey	25	(3)

International career
2008	Russia U-17	9	(2)
2010	Russia U-19	2	(0)
2009–2013	Russia U-21	27	(4)
- * Club domestic league appearances and goals

Pavel Vladimirovich Yakovlev (Russian: Павел Владимирович Яковлев; born 7 April 1991) is a Russian former football player who played as a left winger.

== Career ==
Pavel Yakovlev was born in the Moscow suburb of Lyubertsy and started his football education at local Zvezda football school. The youngster was noted by Saturn and Spartak youth scouts, and he moved to the Spartak youth academy.

He made his debut for Spartak Moscow in the Russian Premier League on 13 June 2009 in a game against FC Khimki.

Although at school and in the reserves Yakovlev played chiefly as a striker, in the main squad of his team he is often used as a winger.

On 31 August 2016, Yakovlev signed a three-year contract with Anzhi Makhachkala. On 2 July 2018, Yakovlev was released by Anzhi.

On 23 July 2018, he joined Krylia Sovetov Samara for the fourth time.

On 19 August 2021, he moved to Kyzylzhar in Kazakhstan.

== International career ==
Yakovlev was a part of the Russia U-21 side that competed in the 2011 European Under-21 Championship qualification.

== Career statistics ==
=== Club ===
As of 20 May 2018

Club	Season	League			Cup		Continental		Other		Total	
Club	Season	Division	Apps	Goals	Apps	Goals	Apps	Goals	Apps	Goals	Apps	Goals
Spartak Moscow	2007	Russian Premier League	0	0	0	0	0	0	–		0	0
Spartak Moscow	2008	Russian Premier League	0	0	0	0	0	0	–		0	0
Spartak Moscow	2009	Russian Premier League	14	4	2	0	–		–		16	4
Spartak Moscow	2010	Russian Premier League	6	0	1	0	–		–		7	0
Krylia Sovetov Samara	2010	Russian Premier League	12	4	–		–		–		12	4
Spartak Moscow	2011–12	Russian Premier League	9	1	2	1	5	0	–		16	2
Krylia Sovetov Samara	2011–12	Russian Premier League	24	5	–		–		–		24	5
Spartak Moscow	2012–13	Russian Premier League	16	2	1	0	0	0	–		17	2
Spartak Moscow	2013–14	Russian Premier League	22	3	1	0	2	0	–		25	3
Spartak Moscow	2014–15	Russian Premier League	8	0	1	1	–		–		9	1
Spartak-2 Moscow	2014–15	PFL	3	2	–		–		–		3	2
Mordovia Saransk	2014–15	Russian Premier League	11	0	1	0	–		–		12	0
Spartak Moscow	2015–16	Russian Premier League	0	0	–		–		–		0	0
Spartak-2 Moscow	2015–16	FNL	3	0	–		–		–		3	0
Krylia Sovetov Samara	2015–16	Russian Premier League	12	1	2	0	–		–		14	1
Krylia Sovetov Samara	Total (3 spells)		48	10	2	0	0	0	0	0	50	10
Spartak Moscow	2016–17	Russian Premier League	0	0	–		0	0	–		0	0
Spartak Moscow	Total (5 spells)		75	10	8	2	7	0	0	0	90	12
Spartak-2 Moscow	2016–17	FNL	9	2	–		–		–		9	2
Spartak-2 Moscow	Total (3 spells)		15	4	0	0	0	0	0	0	15	4
Anzhi Makhachkala	2016–17	Russian Premier League	14	1	1	0	–		–		15	1
Anzhi Makhachkala	2017–18	Russian Premier League	21	2	0	0	–		1 (Note: One appearance in relegation play-offs)	0	22	2
Anzhi Makhachkala	Total		35	3	1	0	0	0	1	0	37	3
Career total			184	27	12	2	7	0	1	0	204	29
