= Dzhamal Dibirgadzhiyev =

Russian footballer

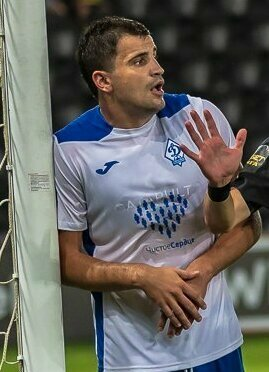
- Dibirgadzhiyev with Dynamo Makhachkala in 2022

Personal information
- Full name: Dzhamal Usumiyevich Dibirgadzhiyev
- Date of birth: 2 August 1996 (age 30)
- Place of birth: Makhachkala, Russia
- Height: 1.90 m (6 ft 3 in)
- Position: Forward

Team information
- Current team: Luki-Energiya
- Number: 9

Senior career*
Years	Team	Apps	(Gls)
2014–2019	Anzhi Makhachkala	3	(1)
2014–2015	→ Anzhi-2 Makhachkala	19	(10)
2016–2017	→ Fátima (loan)	15	(10)
2017–2018	→ Anzhi-2 Makhachkala	4	(0)
2018–2019	→ Veles Moscow (loan)	25	(8)
2019–2020	Chernomorets Novorossiysk	16	(12)
2020	Shkupi	0	(0)
2020	Gorodeya	4	(1)
2021	Dynamo Bryansk	13	(2)
2021	Baltika Kaliningrad	11	(0)
2022	Dynamo Makhachkala	29	(8)
2023	Veles Moscow	14	(5)
2023–2024	Volga Ulyanovsk	26	(5)
2024	→ Amkar Perm (loan)	9	(2)
2025	Amkar Perm	24	(5)
2026–	Luki-Energiya	26	(4)
- * Club domestic league appearances and goals as of 1 November 2026

Dzhamal Usumiyevich Dibirgadzhiyev (Russian: Джамал Усумиевич Дибиргаджиев; born 2 August 1996) is a Russian footballer who plays as a striker for Luki-Energiya.

== Career ==
=== Club ===
Dibirgadzhiyev made his professional debut in the Russian Professional Football League for FC Anzhi-2 Makhachkala on 12 August 2014 in a game against FC Alania Vladikavkaz.

In August 2016, Dibirgadzhiyev moved on loan to Portuguese side Fátima for the 2016–17 season.

On 18 September 2016, he scored 6 goals for Fátima in a Campeonato de Portugal 8–0 victory against Naval.

He made his Russian Premier League debut for Anzhi on 1 October 2017 in a game against FC Zenit Saint Petersburg.

On 4 August 2020, he signed a three-year contract with Shkupi in North Macedonia.

== Career statistics ==
=== Club ===
As of 9 December 2017

Club	Season	League			Cup		Continental		Other		Total	
Club	Season	Division	Apps	Goals	Apps	Goals	Apps	Goals	Apps	Goals	Apps	Goals
Anzhi Makhachkala	2013–14	Russian Premier League	0	0	0	0	0	0	–		0	0
Anzhi Makhachkala	2014–15	FNL	1	1	0	0	–		3 (Note: Three appearances in FNL Cup)	3	4	4
Anzhi Makhachkala	2015–16	Russian Premier League	0	0	0	0	–		–		0	0
Anzhi Makhachkala	2016–17	Russian Premier League	0	0	–		–		–		0	0
Anzhi-2 Makhachkala	2014–15	PFL	19	10	–		–		–		19	10
Fátima	2016–17	Campeonato de Portugal	15	10	–		–		–		15	10
Anzhi Makhachkala	2017–18	Russian Premier League	2	0	1	0	–		–		3	0
Anzhi Makhachkala	Total (2 spells)		3	1	1	0	0	0	3	3	7	4
Anzhi-2 Makhachkala	2017–18	PFL	4	0	–		–		–		4	0
Anzhi-2 Makhachkala	Total (2 spells)		23	10	0	0	0	0	0	0	23	10
Career total			41	21	1	0	0	0	3	3	45	24
