= Ivan Markelov =

Russian footballer (born 1988)

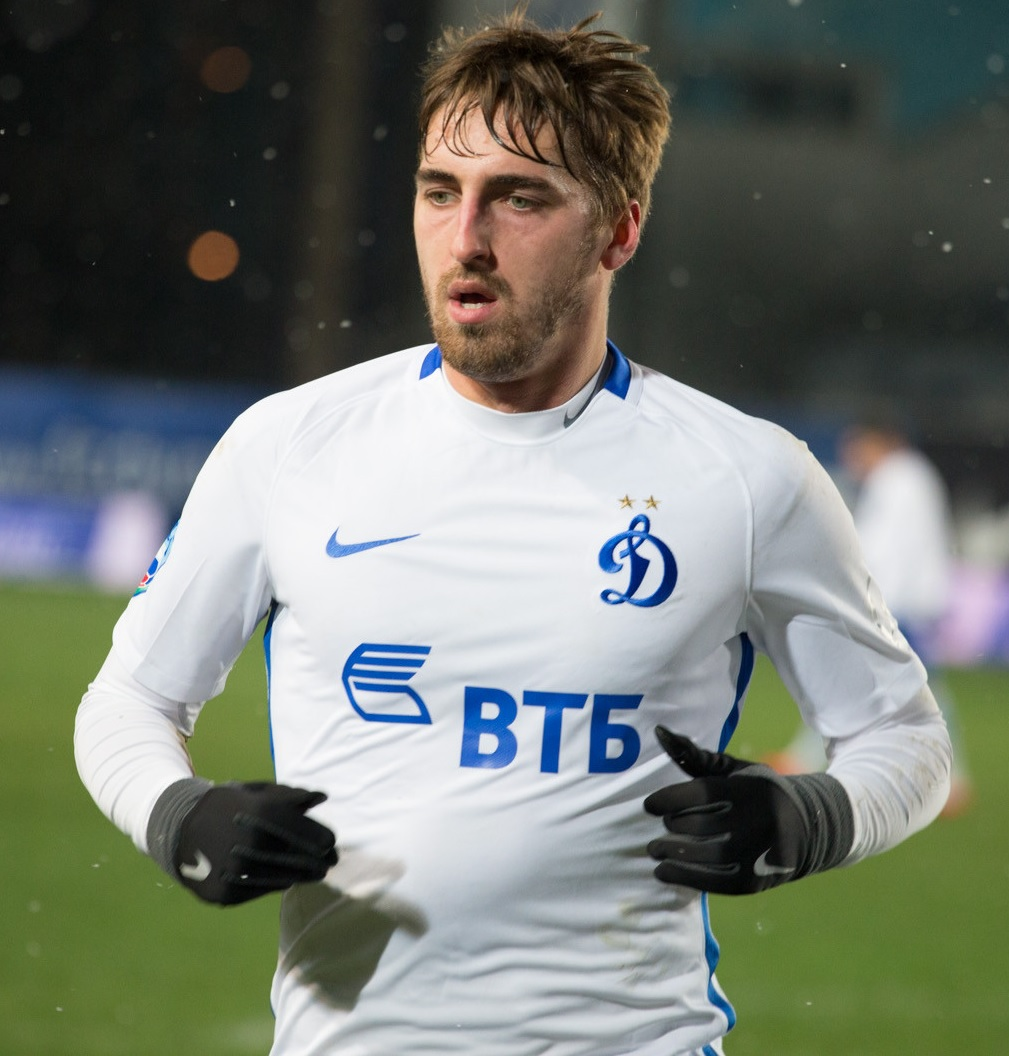
- Markelov with Dynamo Moscow in 2016

Personal information
- Full name: Ivan Aleksandrovich Markelov
- Date of birth: 17 April 1988 (age 38)
- Place of birth: Moscow, Russian SFSR
- Height: 1.84 m (6 ft 0 in)
- Positions: Midfielder; forward

Youth career
- SDYuShOR Zenit St. Petersburg

Senior career*
Years	Team	Apps	(Gls)
2006–2008	Zenit-2 St.Petersburg	51	(10)
2008	Dynamo Moscow	0	(0)
2009–2010	Vityaz Podolsk	11	(3)
2011–2012	Petrotrest St.Petersburg	35	(4)
2012–2013	Karelia Petrozavodsk	21	(3)
2013–2014	Dynamo St.Petersburg	24	(3)
2014–2015	Sokol Saratov	26	(6)
2015–2016	Orenburg	34	(9)
2016–2017	Dynamo Moscow	13	(2)
2017–2019	Anzhi Makhachkala	41	(4)
2019	Tambov	5	(0)
2020–2021	Kyzylzhar	18	(0)
2021–2023	Amkar Perm	46	(11)
2023–2024	Tyumen	32	(3)
2024–2025	Leningradets	16	(2)
2025–2026	Chayka Peschanokopskoye	13	(0)
- * Club domestic league appearances and goals as of 29 November 2025

Ivan Aleksandrovich Markelov (Russian: Иван Александрович Маркелов; born 17 April 1988) is a Russian former professional football player who played as a left winger or forward.

== Club career ==
Markelov made his Russian Premier League debut for Orenburg on 30 July 2016, in a game against Rostov.

On 20 June 2017, he signed a 2-year contract with Anzhi Makhachkala.

On 9 July 2019, Markelov signed a 1-year contract with Russian Premier League newcomer Tambov. The contract was dissolved by mutual consent in early September 2019.

On 18 February 2020, Markelov signed for Kazakhstan Premier League club Kyzylzhar.

== Career statistics ==
=== Club ===
As of 20 May 2018

Club	Season	League			Cup		Continental		Other		Total	
Club	Season	Division	Apps	Goals	Apps	Goals	Apps	Goals	Apps	Goals	Apps	Goals
Zenit-2 St. Petersburg	2006	PFL	26	5	5	1	–		–		31	6
Zenit-2 St. Petersburg	2007	PFL	20	4	0	0	–		–		20	4
Zenit-2 St. Petersburg	2008	PFL	5	1	1	0	–		–		6	1
Zenit-2 St. Petersburg	Total		51	10	6	1	0	0	0	0	57	11
Dynamo Moscow	2008	Russian Premier League	0	0	0	0	–		–		0	0
Vityaz Podolsk	2009	FNL	3	0	0	0	–		–		3	0
Vityaz Podolsk	2010	PFL	8	3	1	0	–		–		9	3
Vityaz Podolsk	Total		11	3	1	0	0	0	0	0	12	3
Petrotrest St. Petersburg	2011–12	PFL	35	4	0	0	–		–		35	4
Karelia Petrozavodsk	2012–13	PFL	21	3	1	0	–		–		22	3
Dynamo St. Petersburg	2013–14	FNL	24	3	1	0	–		–		25	3
Sokol Saratov	2014–15	FNL	26	6	1	0	–		–		27	6
Orenburg	2015–16	FNL	30	9	1	0	–		–		31	9
Orenburg	2016–17	Russian Premier League	4	0	0	0	–		–		4	0
Orenburg	Total		34	9	1	0	0	0	0	0	35	9
Dynamo Moscow	2016–17	FNL	13	2	1	1	–		–		14	3
Dynamo Moscow	Total (2 spells)		13	2	1	1	0	0	0	0	14	3
Anzhi Makhachkala	2017–18	Russian Premier League	26	4	0	0	–		2 (Note: Two appearances in relegation play-offs)	0	28	4
Career total			241	44	12	2	0	0	2	0	255	46
