= Stanislav Karakoz =

Russian footballer (born 1999)

Personal information
- Full name: Stanislav Savvich Karakoz
- Date of birth: 20 October 1999 (age 27)
- Place of birth: Adler, Russia
- Height: 1.92 m (6 ft 4 in)
- Position: Defender

Senior career*
Years	Team	Apps	(Gls)
2016–2018	FC Chertanovo Moscow	5	(0)
2018	→ FC Anzhi Makhachkala (loan)	0	(0)
2018	→ FC Anzhi-2 Makhachkala (loan)	5	(0)
2018	→ FC Chertanovo-2 Moscow	13	(0)
2019	FSC Dolgoprudny	5	(0)
2020	FC Druzhba Maykop	13	(0)

International career
2017	Russia U-18	3	(0)
- * Club domestic league appearances and goals

Stanislav Savvich Karakoz (Russian: Станислав Саввич Каракоз; born 20 October 1999) is a Russian former football player.

== Club career ==
He made his debut in the Russian Professional Football League for FC Chertanovo Moscow on 23 October 2016 in a game against FC Kaluga.

He made his Russian Football National League debut for Chertanovo on 10 November 2018 in a game against FC Armavir.
