= Amur Kalmykov =

Russian footballer

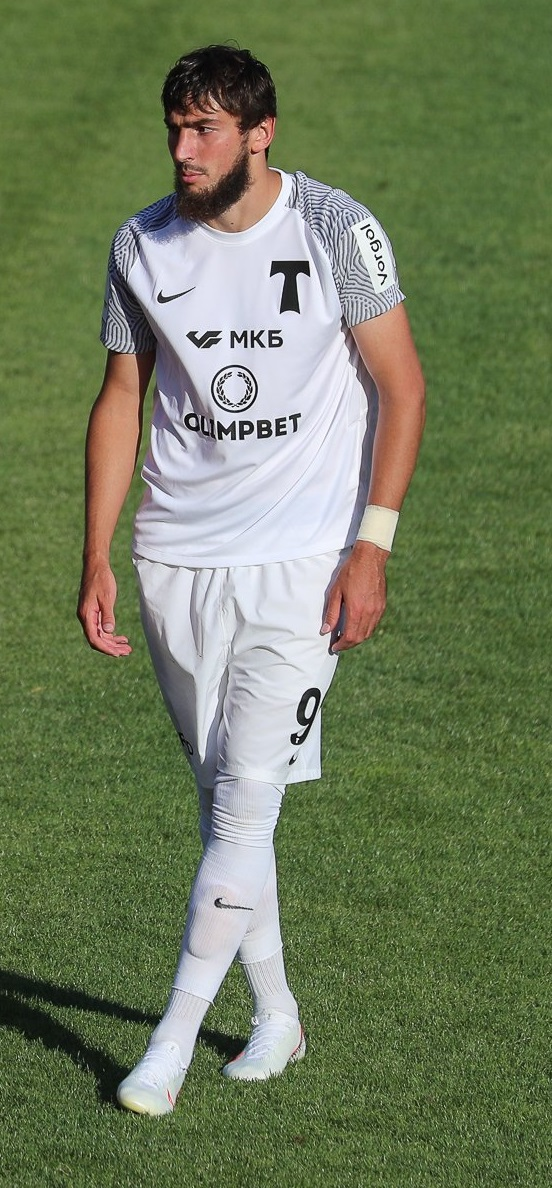
- Kalmukov with Torpedo Moscow in 2021

Personal information
- Full name: Amur Arsenovich Kalmykov
- Date of birth: 29 May 1994 (age 32)
- Place of birth: Islamey, Kabardino-Balkaria, Russia
- Height: 1.92 m (6 ft 4 in)
- Position: Forward

Team information
- Current team: Spartak Kostroma
- Number: 90

Youth career
- –2015: DYuSSh-31 Nalchik

Senior career*
Years	Team	Apps	(Gls)
2015–2017	FC Kubanskaya Korona Tbilisskaya (amateur)		
2017	Afips Afipsky	13	(10)
2017–2019	Anzhi Makhachkala	6	(0)
2018	→ Anzhi-2 Makhachkala	1	(0)
2018–2019	→ Urozhay Krasnodar (loan)	27	(17)
2019–2020	Armavir	25	(8)
2020	Tambov	3	(0)
2020–2022	Torpedo Moscow	73	(25)
2022–2024	Rodina Moscow	65	(13)
2025	Arsenal Tula	34	(11)
2026–	Spartak Kostroma	12	(7)
- * Club domestic league appearances and goals as of 16 May 2026

Amur Arsenovich Kalmykov (Russian: Амур Арсенович Калмыков; born 29 May 1994) is a Russian football player who plays for Spartak Kostroma.

== Club career ==
Kalmykov made his debut in the Russian Professional Football League for Afips Afipsky on 2 September 2017 in a game against Kuban-2 Krasnodar.

On 30 December 2017, he signed a 3-year contract with Anzhi Makhachkala. He made his Russian Premier League debut for Anzhi on 2 March 2018 in a game against Rubin Kazan. He joined Urozhay Krasnodar on loan for the 2018–19 season on 26 July 2018.

On 10 June 2019, Kalmykov signed with Armavir.

On 7 July 2020, he signed a contract with Russian Premier League club Tambov until the end of the 2019–20 season, with an option to extend it for additional 2 years.

On 12 August 2020, Kalmykov signed a three-year contract with Torpedo Moscow. On 2 September 2022, Kalmykov was released by Torpedo.

== Career statistics ==
As of 16 May 2026

Club	Season	League			Cup		Other		Total	
Club	Season	Division	Apps	Goals	Apps	Goals	Apps	Goals	Apps	Goals
Kuban Krasnodar	2016–17	Russian First League	–		–		2 (Note: Appearances in FNL Cup)	0	2	0
Afips Afipsky	2017–18	Russian Second League	13	10	0	0	–		13	10
Anzhi-2 Makhachkala	2017–18	Russian Second League	1	0	–		–		1	0
Anzhi Makhachkala	2017–18	Russian Premier League	6	0	–		1 (Note: Appearance in relegation play-offs)	1	7	1
Urozhay Krasnodar	2018–19	Russian Second League	27	17	0	0	–		27	17
Armavir	2019–20	Russian First League	25	8	1	0	–		26	8
Tambov	2019–20	Russian Premier League	3	0	–		–		3	0
Torpedo Moscow	2020–21	Russian First League	35	12	1	0	–		36	12
Torpedo Moscow	2021–22	Russian First League	33	13	3	1	–		36	14
Torpedo Moscow	2022–23	Russian Premier League	5	0	1	0	–		6	0
Torpedo Moscow	Total		73	25	5	1	0	0	78	26
Rodina Moscow	2022–23	Russian First League	21	5	2	0	2 (Note: Appearances in promotion play-offs)	1	25	6
Rodina Moscow	2023–24	Russian First League	32	7	4	2	–		36	9
Rodina Moscow	2024–25	Russian First League	12	1	1	1	–		13	2
Rodina Moscow	Total		65	13	7	3	2	1	74	17
Arsenal Tula	2024–25	Russian First League	13	3	–		–		13	3
Arsenal Tula	2025–26	Russian First League	21	8	2	0	–		23	8
Arsenal Tula	Total		34	11	2	0	0	0	36	11
Spartak Kostroma	2025–26	Russian First League	12	7	–		–		12	7
Career total			259	91	15	4	5	2	279	97

== Honours ==
=== Individual ===
- Russian Professional Football League Zone South best player, top scorer (17 goals) (2018–19).
