= Eminkhyur =

Eminkhyur Эминхюр Эминхуьр
- Selo
- Location within Republic of Dagestan Location within Russia
- Coordinates: 41°45′N 48°19′E
- Country: Russia
- Region: Republic of Dagestan
- District: Suleyman-Stalsky District
- Time zone: UTC+3:00

Eminkhyur (Russian: Эминхюр; Lezgian: Эминхуьр) is a rural locality (a selo) in Suleyman-Stalsky District, Republic of Dagestan, Russia. Population: 3,215 (2010 census); 3,402 (2002 census); 1,766 (1989 Soviet census). There are 74 streets.

== Geography ==
Eminkhyur is located 22 km northeast of Kasumkent (the district's administrative centre) by road. Sovetskoye is the nearest rural locality.
