= Vladimir Poluyakhtov =

Russian footballer

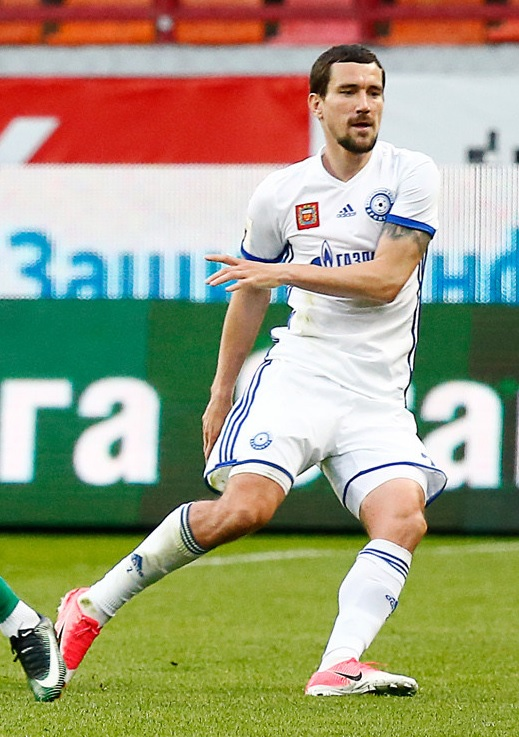
- Poluyakhtov with Orenburg in 2017

Personal information
- Full name: Vladimir Aleksandrovich Poluyakhtov
- Date of birth: 11 July 1989 (age 37)
- Place of birth: Krasavino, Vologda Oblast, Russian SFSR
- Height: 1.85 m (6 ft 1 in)
- Position: Midfielder

Team information
- Current team: Orenburg (assistant coach)

Youth career
- SDYuSShOR-3 Vologda
- UOR Master-Saturn Yegoryevsk
- 2007: Moscow

Senior career*
Years	Team	Apps	(Gls)
2008–2010	Saturn-2 Moscow Oblast	77	(2)
2010	→ Dynamo Saint Petersburg (loan)	13	(0)
2011	Zhemchuzhina-Sochi	1	(0)
2011–2017	Orenburg	174	(12)
2017–2018	Anzhi Makhachkala	27	(3)
2018–2021	Krylia Sovetov Samara	63	(2)
2021–2024	Orenburg	39	(2)

Managerial career
- 2024–: Orenburg (assistant)
- * Club domestic league appearances and goals

Vladimir Aleksandrovich Poluyakhtov (Russian: Владимир Александрович Полуяхтов; born 11 July 1989) is a Russian professional football coach and a former player who is an assistant coach for Orenburg. He played as a right back, left back or midfielder.

== Career statistics ==
=== Club ===
As of 25 May 2024

Club	Season	League			Cup		Continental		Other		Total	
Club	Season	Division	Apps	Goals	Apps	Goals	Apps	Goals	Apps	Goals	Apps	Goals
Saturn-2	2008	Russian Second League	33	0	3	0	–		–		36	0
Saturn-2	2009	Russian Second League	29	0	3	0	–		–		32	0
Saturn-2	2010	Russian Second League	15	2	3	0	–		–		18	2
Saturn-2	Total		77	2	9	0	0	0	0	0	86	2
Dynamo St. Petersburg	2010	Russian First League	13	0	–		–		–		13	0
Zhemchuzhina Sochi	2011–12	Russian First League	1	0	0	0	–		–		1	0
Orenburg	2011–12	Russian First League	26	2	0	0	–		–		26	2
Orenburg	2012–13	Russian Second League	25	3	2	0	–		–		27	3
Orenburg	2013–14	Russian First League	28	1	2	0	–		–		30	1
Orenburg	2014–15	Russian First League	33	3	4	0	–		1 (Note: Appearances in the FNL Cup)	0	38	3
Orenburg	2015–16	Russian First League	37	1	1	0	–		3	0	41	1
Orenburg	2016–17	Russian Premier League	25	2	2	0	–		2 (Note: Appearances in relegation play-offs)	0	29	2
Orenburg	Total		174	12	11	0	0	0	6	0	191	12
Anzhi Makhachkala	2017–18	Russian Premier League	27	3	0	0	–		2	2	29	5
Krylia Sovetov Samara	2018–19	Russian Premier League	14	0	1	0	–		2	0	17	0
Krylia Sovetov Samara	2019–20	Russian Premier League	12	0	0	0	–		–		12	0
Krylia Sovetov Samara	2020–21	Russian First League	37	2	5	0	–		–		42	2
Krylia Sovetov Samara	Total		63	2	6	0	0	0	2	0	71	2
Orenburg	2021–22	Russian First League	15	2	0	0	–		2 (Note: Appearances in promotion play-offs)	0	17	2
Orenburg	2022–23	Russian Premier League	20	0	6	1	–		–		26	1
Orenburg	2023–24	Russian Premier League	4	0	7	0	–		–		11	0
Orenburg	Total		39	2	13	1	0	0	2	0	54	3
Career total			394	21	39	1	0	0	12	2	445	24
