= Anton Belov (footballer) =

Russian football player (born 1996)

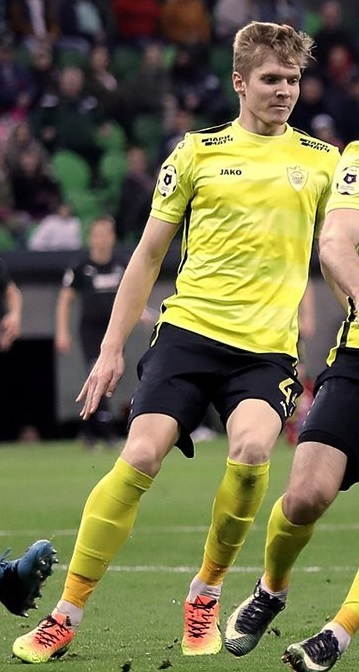
- Belov with Anzhi Makhachkala in 2019

Personal information
- Full name: Anton Alekseyevich Belov
- Date of birth: 2 May 1996 (age 30)
- Place of birth: Saratov, Russia
- Height: 1.91 m (6 ft 3 in)
- Position: Centre back

Youth career
- 2011–2015: Sokol Saratov

Senior career*
Years	Team	Apps	(Gls)
2016–2019	Anzhi Makhachkala	6	(0)
2017	→ Zenit Penza (loan)	2	(0)
2017	→ Anzhi-2 Makhachkala	20	(1)
2018	→ Zorkiy Krasnogorsk (loan)	24	(6)
2019–2020	Pyunik	8	(0)
2020	Tom Tomsk	7	(0)
2020–2023	Metallurg Lipetsk	61	(3)
2023	Zorkiy Krasnogorsk	16	(2)
2024	Dynamo Vladivostok	1	(0)
2024–2025	Dynamo St. Petersburg	22	(2)
- * Club domestic league appearances and goals as of 1 November 2025

Anton Alekseyevich Belov (Russian: Антон Алексеевич Белов; born 2 May 1996) is a Russian football player.

== Club career ==
Belov debuted in the Russian Professional Football League for Zenit Penza on 16 April 2017 in a game against Energomash Belgorod.

Again, he debuted for the main squad of Anzhi Makhachkala on 20 September 2017 in a Russian Cup game against Luch-Energiya Vladivostok.

Belov made his Russian Premier League debut for Anzhi on 15 March 2019 in a game against Krylia Sovetov Samara.

On 17 June 2019, Anzhi announced that Belov had left the club to sign for Armenian Premier League club Pyunik. On 2 July 2020, Pyunik announced that Belov had left the club after his contract had expired.

On 7 July 2020, Belov signed a one-year contract with Tom Tomsk.
