= Tagir Musalov =

Russian-Azerbaijani footballer (born 1994)

Personal information
- Full name: Tagir Akhmedovich Musalov
- Date of birth: 9 February 1994 (age 32)
- Place of birth: Khushtada, Russia
- Height: 1.83 m (6 ft 0 in)
- Positions: Forward; midfielder

Senior career*
Years	Team	Apps	(Gls)
2011	LFK Rubin Kazan		
2012–2014	FC Anzhi Makhachkala	0	(0)
2014–2015	FC Anzhi-2 Makhachkala	26	(2)
2015–2016	FC Anzhi Makhachkala	0	(0)
2017	FC Legion Dynamo Makhachkala	3	(0)
2017	FC Anzhi Makhachkala	0	(0)
2017	→ FC Anzhi-2 Makhachkala	15	(2)
2019–2020	FC Makhachkala	26	(3)
- * Club domestic league appearances and goals

Tagir Akhmedovich Musalov (Russian: Тагир Ахмедович Мусалов; born 9 February 1994) is a Russian-Azeri former professional footballer.

== Club career ==
He made his professional debut in the Russian Professional Football League for FC Anzhi-2 Makhachkala on 12 August 2014 in a game against FC Alania Vladikavkaz.

He made his debut for the main squad of FC Anzhi Makhachkala on 20 September 2017 in a Russian Cup game against FC Luch-Energiya Vladivostok.

== Personal life ==
He is the twin brother of Magomed Musalov.
