= Khushtada =

Khushtada Хуштада
- Selo
- Location within Republic of Dagestan Location within Russia
- Coordinates: 42°24′N 46°10′E
- Country: Russia
- Region: Republic of Dagestan
- District: Tsumadinsky District
- Time zone: UTC+3:00

Khushtada (Russian: Хуштада) is a rural locality (a selo) in Tsumadinsky District, Republic of Dagestan, Russia. Population: 1,081 (2021 census); 842 (2002 census); 745 (1989 Soviet census). There are 8 streets in this selo.

== Geography ==
Selo is located 4 km from Agvali (the district's administrative centre), 120 km from Makhachkala (capital of Dagestan) and 1,630 km from Moscow. Tlondoda is the nearest rural locality.
