= Valentin Andyamov =

Russian footballer

Personal information
- Full name: Valentin Vadimovich Andyamov
- Date of birth: 14 February 2000 (age 26)
- Height: 1.72 m (5 ft 8 in)
- Position: Midfielder

Team information
- Current team: FC Luki-Energiya Velikiye Luki
- Number: 14

Youth career
- FC Spartak Moscow
- FShM Moscow
- PFC CSKA Moscow
- FC Anzhi Makhachkala

Senior career*
Years	Team	Apps	(Gls)
2019	FC Anzhi Makhachkala	0	(0)
2019–2020	FC Ararat Moscow	13	(0)
2020	FC Chernomorets Novorossiysk	0	(0)
2020–2021	FC Kolomna	20	(0)
2021–2023	FC SKA-Khabarovsk-2	38	(0)
2021–2022	FC SKA-Khabarovsk	11	(0)
2023	FC Znamya Noginsk	25	(0)
2024–2026	FC Dynamo Vladivostok	31	(0)
2026–	FC Luki-Energiya Velikiye Luki	25	(1)
- * Club domestic league appearances and goals as of 1 November 2026

Valentin Vadimovich Andyamov (Russian: Валентин Вадимович Андямов; born 14 February 2000) is a Russian football player who plays for FC Luki-Energiya Velikiye Luki.

== Club career ==
He made his debut in the Russian Football National League for FC SKA-Khabarovsk on 11 September 2021 in a game against FC Alania Vladikavkaz.
