= Alan Bagayev =

Russian footballer

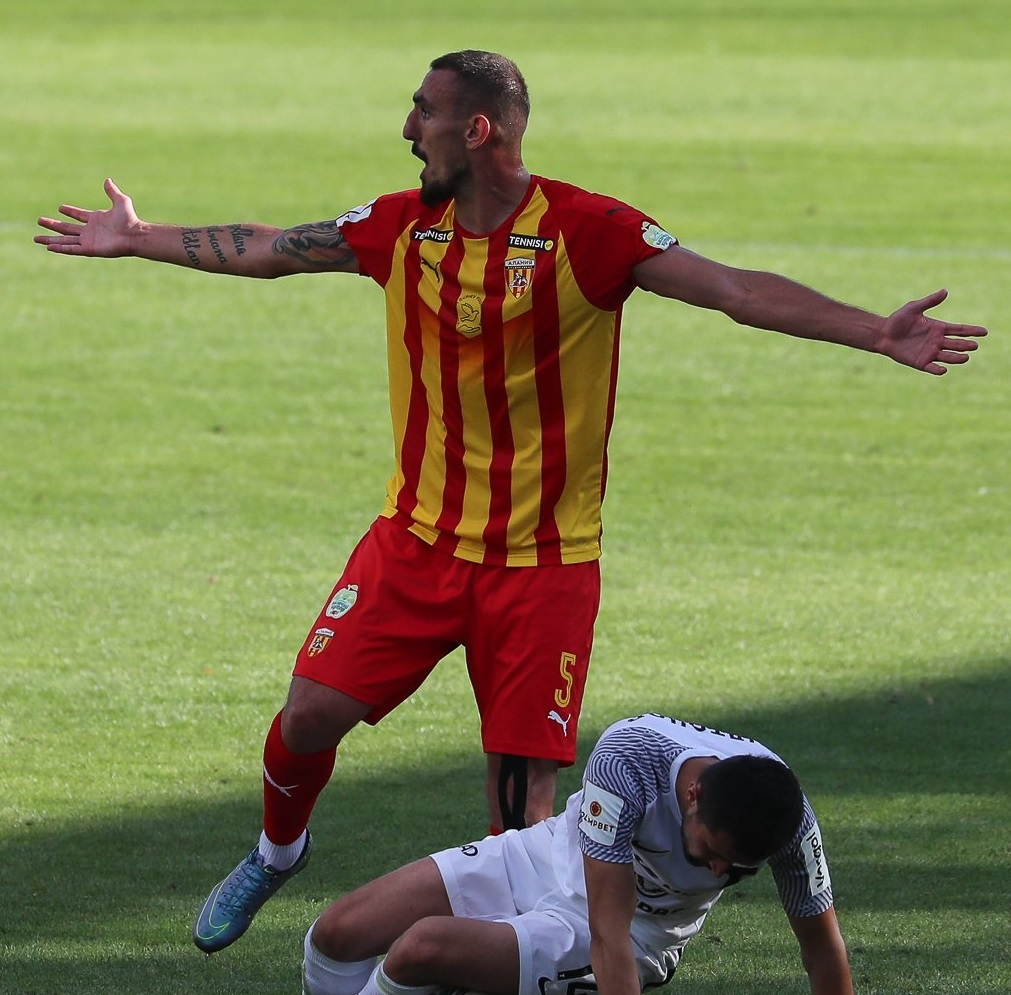
- Bagayev with Alania in 2021

Personal information
- Full name: Alan Spartakovich Bagayev
- Date of birth: 7 April 1991 (age 35)
- Place of birth: Vladikavkaz, Russian SFSR
- Height: 1.93 m (6 ft 4 in)
- Position: Defender

Team information
- Current team: FC Alania Vladikavkaz
- Number: 5

Senior career*
Years	Team	Apps	(Gls)
2009–2010	FC Amkar Perm	0	(0)
2010–2011	FC Alania Vladikavkaz	0	(0)
2011	FC FAYUR Beslan	10	(0)
2012	FC Rostov	0	(0)
2012–2014	FC Alania-d Vladikavkaz	34	(5)
2014	FC Ural Sverdlovsk Oblast	0	(0)
2014–2015	FC Alania Vladikavkaz	15	(2)
2015–2016	FC Dila Gori	24	(0)
2015	→ FC Shukura Kobuleti (loan)	12	(0)
2016–2017	FC Mordovia Saransk	34	(1)
2017	FC Anzhi Makhachkala	1	(0)
2018	FC Mordovia Saransk	15	(1)
2019	FC Spartak Vladikavkaz	11	(0)
2019–	FC Alania Vladikavkaz	149	(10)
- * Club domestic league appearances and goals as of 15 November 2026

Alan Spartakovich Bagayev (Russian: Алан Спартакович Багаев; born 7 April 1991) is a Russian football defender who plays for FC Alania Vladikavkaz.

== Club career ==
He made his debut in the Russian Second Division for FC FAYUR Beslan on 26 April 2011 in a game against FC Rotor Volgograd.

He made his Russian Premier League debut for FC Anzhi Makhachkala on 19 August 2017 in a game against FC Rubin Kazan.
