= 2017–18 Russian Premier League =

26th season of top-tier football league in Russia

Russian Premier League
- Season: 2017–18
- Champions: Lokomotiv Moscow; 3rd title
- Relegated: Amkar Perm; Tosno; SKA-Khabarovsk
- Champions League: Lokomotiv Moscow; CSKA Moscow; Spartak Moscow
- Europa League: Krasnodar; Zenit St. Petersburg; Ufa
- Matches: 240
- Goals: 541 (2.25 per match)
- Top goalscorer: Quincy Promes (15 goals)
- Biggest home win: Rubin 6–0 Anzhi; CSKA Moscow 6–0 Tosno; CSKA Moscow 6–0 Arsenal Tula; Zenit St. Petersburg 6–0 SKA-Khabarovsk
- Biggest away win: Anzhi 1–5 Krasnodar; Dynamo Moscow 0–4 Lokomotiv Moscow
- Highest scoring: Spartak Moscow 3–4 Lokomotiv Moscow
- Longest winning run: 5 matches: Spartak Moscow (5 Nov–10 Dec)
- Longest unbeaten run: 18 matches: Spartak Moscow (27 Aug–8 Apr)
- Longest winless run: 18 matches: SKA-Khabarovsk (14 Oct–13 May)
- Longest losing run: 9 matches: SKA-Khabarovsk (29 Oct–17 Mar)
- Highest attendance: 53,359; Zenit St. Petersburg 5–1 Spartak Moscow (6 August 2017)
- Lowest attendance: 1,089; Amkar 0–2 Arsenal (9 March 2018) (Note: The match was played in Ufa.)
- Total attendance: 3,353,024
- Average attendance: 13,971

The 2017–18 Russian Premier League was the 26th season of the premier football competition in Russia since the dissolution of the Soviet Union and the 16th under the current Russian Premier League name. Spartak Moscow came into the season as the defending champions.

== Teams ==
Locations of teams in 2017–18 Russian Premier League
Locations of teams in 2017–18 Russian Premier League (Khabarovsk)

As in the previous season, 16 teams played in the 2017–18 season. After the 2016–17 season, FC Orenburg, FC Tom Tomsk and FC Krylia Sovetov Samara were relegated to the 2017–18 Russian National Football League. They were replaced by three clubs from the 2016–17 Russian National Football League, FC Dynamo Moscow, FC Tosno and FC SKA-Khabarovsk. Dynamo returned after one season of absence, while Tosno and SKA-Khabarovsk made their debuts in the Russian top-tier division.

Before the season, FC Terek Grozny changed its name to FC Akhmat Grozny.

=== Stadiums ===
Team	Stadium	City	Opened	Capacity
Akhmat Grozny	Akhmat-Arena	Grozny	2011	30,597
Amkar Perm	Zvezda Stadium	Perm	1969	17,000
Anzhi Makhachkala	Anzhi Arena	Kaspiysk	2003	26,400
Arsenal Tula	Arsenal Stadium	Tula	1959	20,048
CSKA Moskva	VEB Arena	Moscow	2016	30,000
Dynamo Moskva	Arena Khimki	Khimki	2008	18,636
Krasnodar	Krasnodar Stadium	Krasnodar	2016	34,291
Lokomotiv Moskva	Lokomotiv Stadium	Moscow	2002	28,800
Rostov	Rostov Arena	Rostov-on-Don	2018	37,868
Rubin Kazan	Kazan Arena	Kazan	2013	45,379
SKA-Khabarovsk	Lenin Stadium	Khabarovsk	1951	15,200
Spartak Moskva	Otkrytiye Arena	Moscow	2014	45,360
Tosno	Petrovsky Stadium	Saint Petersburg	1925	21,405
Ufa	Neftyanik Stadium	Ufa	1967	15,234
Ural Yekaterinburg	Central Stadium	Yekaterinburg	1940	35,696
Zenit Saint Petersburg	Krestovsky Stadium	Saint Petersburg	2017	64,287

=== Personnel and kits ===
Team	Location	Head coach	Kit manufacturer	Shirt sponsor
Akhmat Grozny	Grozny	(Russia) Igor Lediakhov (caretaker)	Adidas	Akhmat Foundation
Amkar Perm	Perm	(Russia) Vadim Evseev (caretaker)	Adidas	
Anzhi Makhachkala	Makhachkala	(Belarus) Vadim Skripchenko	Nike	
Arsenal Tula	Tula	(Montenegro) Miodrag Božović	Adidas	SPLAV
CSKA Moscow	Moscow	(Belarus) Viktor Goncharenko	Adidas	Rosseti
Dynamo Moscow	Moscow	(Russia) Dmitri Khokhlov	Nike	VTB
Krasnodar	Krasnodar	(Russia) Murad Musayev (caretaker)	Puma	Constell Group
Lokomotiv Moscow	Moscow	(Russia) Yuri Semin	Adidas	RZhD
Rostov	Rostov-on-Don	(Russia) Valeri Karpin	Adidas	
Rubin Kazan	Kazan	(Turkmenistan) Kurban Berdyev	Jako, New Balance	Nizhnekamskneftekhim
SKA-Khabarovsk	Khabarovsk	(Russia) Sergei Perednya	Adidas	LeonBets
Spartak Moscow	Moscow	(Italy) Massimo Carrera	Nike	LUKOIL
Tosno	Tosno	(Ukraine) Dmytro Parfenov	Nike	Fort Group
Ufa	Ufa	(Russia) Sergei Semak	Joma	
Ural Yekaterinburg	Yekaterinburg	(Russia) Aleksandr Tarkhanov	Joma	Renova, TMK
Zenit Saint Petersburg	Saint Petersburg	(Italy) Roberto Mancini	Nike	Gazprom

=== Managerial changes ===
Team	Outgoing manager	Manner of departure	Date of vacancy	Position in table	Replaced by	Date of appointment
Akhmat	(Tajikistan) Rashid Rakhimov	Mutual consent	22 May 2017	pre-season	(Belarus) Oleg Kononov	22 May 2017
Zenit	(Romania) Mircea Lucescu	Fired	28 May 2017	pre-season	(Italy) Roberto Mancini	1 June 2017
Arsenal	(Russia) Sergei Kiriakov	Contract expired	31 May 2017	pre-season	(Montenegro) Miodrag Božović	18 June 2017
Rostov	(Moldova) Ivan Daniliants	Contract expired	1 June 2017	pre-season	(Belarus) Leonid Kuchuk	9 June 2017
Rubin	(Spain) Javi Gracia	Mutual consent	8 June 2017	pre-season	(Turkmenistan) Kurban Berdyev	9 June 2017
Anzhi	(Russia) Aleksandr Grigoryan	Resigned	13 August 2017	15th	(Belarus) Vadim Skripchenko	14 August 2017
Dynamo	(Ukraine) Yuriy Kalitvintsev	Mutual consent	7 October 2017	15th	(Russia) Dmitri Khokhlov	7 October 2017
Akhmat	(Belarus) Oleg Kononov	Resigned	30 October 2017	9th	(Russia) Mikhail Galaktionov (caretaker) (permanent)	30 October 2017; 14 December 2017
Rostov	(Belarus) Leonid Kuchuk	Resigned	6 December 2017	10th	(Russia) Dmitri Kirichenko (caretaker)	6 December 2017
Rostov	(Russia) Dmitri Kirichenko (caretaker)	Caretaking spell over	19 December 2017	10th	(Russia) Valeri Karpin	19 December 2017
SKA-Khabarovsk	(Russia) Aleksei Poddubskiy	Moved to the director of sports position	20 December 2017	16th	(Russia) Rinat Bilyaletdinov	12 January 2018
Amkar	(Russia) Gadzhi Gadzhiyev	Resigned	2 March 2018	13th	(Russia) Vadim Evseev (caretaker)	2 March 2018
SKA-Khabarovsk	(Russia) Rinat Bilyaletdinov	Mutual consent	31 March 2018	16th	(Russia) Sergei Perednya	3 April 2018
Krasnodar	(Russia) Igor Shalimov	Fired	2 April 2018	5th	(Russia) Murad Musayev (caretaker)	3 April 2018
Akhmat	(Russia) Mikhail Galaktionov	Resigned	7 April 2018	11th	(Russia) Igor Lediakhov (caretaker)	7 April 2018

== Tournament format and regulations ==
=== Basic ===
The 16 teams will play a round-robin tournament whereby each team plays each one of the other teams twice, once at home and once away. Thus, a total of 240 matches will be played, with 30 matches played by each team.

=== Promotion and relegation ===
The teams that finish 15th and 16th will be relegated to the FNL, while the top 2 in that league will be promoted to the Premier League for the 2018–19 season.

The 13th and 14th Premier League teams will play the 4th and 3rd FNL teams respectively in two playoff games with the winners securing Premier League spots for the 2018–19 season.

== League table ==
Pos	Team	Pld	W	D	L	GF	GA	GD	Pts	Qualification or relegation
1	Lokomotiv Moscow (C)	30	18	6	6	41	21	+20	60	Qualification for the Champions League group stage
2	CSKA Moscow	30	17	7	6	49	23	+26	58	Qualification for the Champions League group stage
3	Spartak Moscow	30	16	8	6	51	32	+19	56	Qualification for the Champions League third qualifying round
4	Krasnodar	30	16	6	8	46	30	+16	54	Qualification for the Europa League group stage (Note: Tosno qualified for the Europa League group stage by winning the 2017–18 Russian Cup. However, since they failed to obtain a UEFA licence, the spot awarded to the cup winners was passed to fourth-placed team, the spot awarded to the fourth-placed team was passed to fifth-placed team, and the spot awarded to the fifth-placed team was passed to sixth-placed team.)
5	Zenit Saint Petersburg	30	14	11	5	46	21	+25	53	Qualification for the Europa League third qualifying round
6	Ufa	30	11	10	9	34	30	+4	43	Qualification for the Europa League second qualifying round
7	Arsenal Tula	30	12	6	12	35	41	−6	42	
8	Dynamo Moscow	30	10	10	10	29	30	−1	40	
9	Akhmat Grozny	30	10	9	11	30	34	−4	39	
10	Rubin Kazan	30	9	11	10	32	25	+7	38	
11	Rostov	30	9	10	11	27	28	−1	37 (Note: Head-to-head: Rostov 1–0 Ural, Ural 1–1 Rostov)	
12	Ural Yekaterinburg	30	8	13	9	31	32	−1	37	
13	Amkar Perm (D)	30	9	8	13	20	30	−10	35	Dissolved after the season (Note: On 13 June 2018, FC Amkar Perm announced that the Russian Football Union recalled their 2018–19 season license, making them ineligible for the Russian Premier League or Russian Football National League. On 18 June 2018, club president Gennadi Shilov announced that the club will not register for the third-tier Russian Professional Football League and will be dissolved. As a consequence, Anzhi Makhachkala was not relegated.)
14	Anzhi Makhachkala	30	6	6	18	31	55	−24	24 (Note: Head-to-head: Anzhi 2–0 Tosno, Tosno 2–2 Anzhi)	Qualification for the Relegation play-offs
15	Tosno (D)	30	6	6	18	23	54	−31	24	Dissolved after the season (Note: On 30 May 2018, Russian Football National League announced that FC Tosno failed in its appeal to obtain the FNL license for the 2018–19 season. On 9 June 2018, the founder of FORT Group (the company that owned the team), Maxim Levchenko, announced that the team is officially dissolved.)
16	SKA-Khabarovsk (R)	30	2	7	21	16	55	−39	13	Relegation to Football National League

Updated to match(es) played on 13 May 2018. Source: Russian Premier League, Soccerway
Rules for classification: 1) Points; 2) Head-to-head points; 3) Head-to-head matches won; 4) Head-to-head goal difference; 5) Head-to-head goals scored; 6) Head-to-head away goals; 7) Matches won; 8) Goal difference; 9) Goals scored; 10) Away goals scored.
(C) Champions; (D) Dissolved after the season; (R) Relegated

== Relegation play-offs ==
The draw for relegation play-offs scheduling took place on 4 May 2018. The kick-off times were announced on 14 May 2018.

=== First leg ===
17 May 2018
19:00 UTC+7

Yenisey Krasnoyarsk	3–0	Anzhi Makhachkala
Kutyin 25' (pen.), 58'; Sarkisov 32'	Report

Football Arena Yenisey, Krasnoyarsk
Attendance: 3,000
Referee: Mikhail Vilkov (Nizhny Novgorod)

17 May 2018
19:30 UTC+5

Amkar Perm	2–0	Tambov
Gol 60'; Balanovich 79'	Report

Zvezda Stadium, Perm
Attendance: 13,478
Referee: Sergey Lapochkin (Saint Petersburg)

=== Second leg ===
20 May 2018
18:00 UTC+3

Tambov	0–1	Amkar Perm
	Report	Kostyukov 39'

STC Tambov, Tambov
Attendance: 1,500
Referee: Roman Galimov (Ulan-Ude)

Amkar Perm won 3–0 on aggregate and retained their spot in the 2018–19 Russian Premier League; FC Tambov remained in the 2018–19 Russian National Football League.

20 May 2018
21:00 UTC+3

Anzhi Makhachkala	4–3	Yenisey Krasnoyarsk
Poku 45'; Kalmykov 73'; Poluyakhtov 74' 90'	Report	Obradović 15'; Semakin 16'; Serderov 84' (pen.)

Anzhi Arena, Kaspiysk
Attendance: 6,100
Referee: Kirill Levnikov (Saint Petersburg)

Yenisey Krasnoyarsk won 6–4 on aggregate and were promoted to the 2018–19 Russian Premier League; Anzhi Makhachkala were relegated to the 2018–19 Russian National Football League.

On 13 June 2018, FC Amkar Perm announced that the Russian Football Union recalled their 2018–19 season license, making them ineligible for the Russian Premier League or Russian Football National League. The final decision on the club's future will be made on 18 June 2018 at the club's board meeting. As a consequence, Anzhi Makhachkala will not be relegated.

== Results ==
Home \ Away	AKH	AMK	ANZ	ARS	CSK	DYN	KRA	LOK	ROS	RUB	SKA	SPA	TOS	UFA	URA	ZEN
Akhmat Grozny	—	1–0	1–1	1–2	0–3	2–0	2–3	1–1	1–0	1–0	0–0	1–2	1–0	2–1	0–0	0–0
Amkar Perm	0–0	—	1–2	0–2	0–1	2–1	1–3	2–1	0–1	0–3	3–0	0–2	0–0	0–0	1–1	0–1
Anzhi Makhachkala	0–2	1–0	—	3–2	1–3	1–3	1–5	0–1	0–1	1–1	4–0	1–4	2–0	1–0	0–1	2–2
Arsenal Tula	1–0	0–1	2–1	—	1–0	1–0	1–0	2–0	2–2	0–0	1–0	0–1	1–2	2–1	2–2	3–3
CSKA Moscow	0–1	3–0	2–1	6–0	—	1–2	2–1	1–3	2–0	1–2	2–0	2–1	6–0	0–0	1–0	0–0
Dynamo Moscow	1–1	3–0	2–0	2–1	0–0	—	0–0	0–4	2–0	0–0	2–0	2–2	0–1	1–1	0–1	0–0
Krasnodar	3–2	1–1	1–1	3–0	0–1	2–0	—	2–0	3–1	1–1	4–1	1–4	2–0	0–1	1–1	0–2
Lokomotiv Moscow	0–0	0–1	1–0	1–0	2–2	3–0	2–0	—	1–0	1–0	1–0	0–0	0–2	0–0	2–1	1–0
Rostov	0–1	0–0	2–0	2–2	1–2	1–0	0–0	0–1	—	0–1	2–0	2–2	2–0	1–0	1–0	0–0
Rubin Kazan	3–2	0–1	6–0	2–1	0–1	0–0	1–2	1–1	1–1	—	3–1	1–2	1–0	0–0	0–1	0–0
SKA-Khabarovsk	2–2	0–2	2–0	1–2	2–4	0–1	0–1	1–2	2–1	1–1	—	0–0	0–1	2–2	0–3	0–2
Spartak Moscow	1–3	0–0	2–2	2–0	3–0	0–1	2–0	3–4	2–0	1–0	1–0	—	2–1	3–1	2–0	3–1
Tosno	1–0	0–2	2–2	3–2	1–2	1–2	1–3	1–3	1–1	0–1	0–0	2–2	—	0–1	2–2	0–1
Ufa	3–2	3–0	3–2	1–0	1–1	1–1	0–1	1–0	1–4	2–1	1–0	0–0	5–0	—	2–0	1–2
Ural Yekaterinburg	2–0	0–2	2–1	1–1	0–0	2–2	0–1	0–2	1–1	1–1	1–1	2–1	3–1	1–1	—	1–1
Zenit Saint Petersburg	4–0	0–0	1–0	0–1	0–0	2–1	1–2	0–3	0–0	2–1	6–0	5–1	5–0	3–0	2–1	—

Updated to match(es) played on 13 May 2018. Source: Russian Premier League
Legend: Blue = home team win; Yellow = draw; Red = away team win.
For upcoming matches, an "a" indicates there is an article about the rivalry between the two participants.

=== Positions by round ===
The table lists the positions of teams after each week of matches. In order to preserve chronological evolvements, any postponed matches are not included to the round at which they were originally scheduled, but added to the full round they were played immediately afterwards.

Team ╲ Round	1	2	3	4	5	6	7	8	9	10	11	12	13	14	15	16	17	18	19	20	21	22	23	24	25	26	27	28	29	30
Lokomotiv Moscow	6	1	1	2	2	3	2	2	2	3	2	2	2	1	1	1	1	1	1	1	1	1	1	1	1	1	1	1	1	1
CSKA Moscow	1	7	4	8	5	4	4	6	4	4	4	4	3	3	3	4	3	3	3	5	5	3	3	3	3	3	2	3	3	2
Spartak Moscow	7	10	7	10	8	10	11	9	8	8	8	6	5	5	6	5	4	4	4	3	3	2	2	2	2	2	3	2	2	3
Krasnodar	3	2	5	5	3	5	5	4	3	2	3	3	4	6	4	3	5	5	5	4	2	4	5	5	5	5	5	5	4	4
Zenit St. Petersburg	2	3	2	1	1	1	1	1	1	1	1	1	1	2	2	2	2	2	2	2	4	5	4	4	4	4	4	4	5	5
Ufa	4	6	6	4	7	6	7	8	9	11	10	10	7	8	7	8	6	7	6	6	6	6	6	6	7	6	6	6	6	6
Arsenal Tula	14	9	11	14	13	13	13	13	13	10	12	12	10	9	8	7	8	9	9	8	7	7	7	7	6	7	7	7	7	7
Dynamo Moscow	9	11	13	11	11	11	10	11	11	12	13	15	13	13	14	15	14	14	14	12	13	12	10	8	11	11	11	11	10	8
Akhmat Grozny	5	4	3	3	6	7	8	7	7	7	5	5	9	10	9	9	9	6	7	7	8	9	9	12	10	10	10	10	8	9
Rubin Kazan	11	13	10	7	9	9	6	5	6	6	9	11	8	7	10	10	10	12	12	11	11	8	11	11	8	8	9	9	11	10
Rostov	8	12	9	6	4	2	3	3	5	5	6	7	11	11	11	11	11	10	10	10	9	10	12	13	13	12	12	12	12	11
Ural Yekaterinburg	10	5	8	9	10	8	9	10	10	9	7	8	6	4	5	6	7	8	8	9	10	11	8	9	9	9	8	8	9	12
Amkar Perm	13	14	14	15	16	16	16	16	16	14	11	9	12	12	12	12	12	11	11	13	14	14	13	10	12	13	13	13	13	13
Anzhi Makhachkala	12	8	12	13	15	15	15	14	15	16	16	16	16	16	15	14	15	15	15	15	15	15	14	14	14	14	14	14	14	14
Tosno	15	16	15	12	12	12	12	12	12	13	14	13	14	14	13	13	13	13	13	14	12	13	15	15	15	15	15	15	15	15
SKA-Khabarovsk	16	15	16	16	14	14	14	15	14	15	15	14	15	15	16	16	16	16	16	16	16	16	16	16	16	16	16	16	16	16

Source: soccerway.com

== Season statistics ==
=== Top goalscorers ===
Rank	Player	Team	Goals
1	(Netherlands) Quincy Promes	Spartak	15
2	(Russia) Fyodor Smolov	Krasnodar	14
3	(Sweden) Viktor Claesson	Krasnodar	10
3	(Peru) Jefferson Farfán	Lokomotiv	10
3	(Russia) Aleksandr Kokorin	Zenit	10
3	(Brazil) Luiz Adriano	Spartak	10
3	(Brazil) Vitinho	CSKA	10
8	(Russia) Yevgeni Markov	Tosno; Dynamo	9
9	(Romania) Eric Bicfalvi	Ural	8
10	(Montenegro) Luka Đorđević	Arsenal	7
10	(Russia) Artem Dzyuba	Zenit; Arsenal	7
10	(Portugal) Manuel Fernandes	Lokomotiv	7
10	(Nigeria) Sylvester Igboun	Ufa	7
10	(Russia) Aleksei Miranchuk	Lokomotiv	7
10	(Russia) Aleksandr Tashayev	Dynamo	7
10	(Russia) Aleksandr Yerokhin	Zenit	7

Last updated: 13 May 2018

== Attendances ==
Pos	Team	Total	High	Low	Average	Change
1	Zenit	659,438	53,359	30,158	43,963	+136.9%^{1}
2	Spartak Moscow	452,836	44,062	21,445	30,189	−7.8%
3	Krasnodar	375,481	34,055	17,250	25,032	+44.5%
4	CSKA Moscow	234,080	25,916	8,016	15,605	+8.0%
5	Akhmat Grozny	227,572	29,450	8,345	15,171	−0.4%
6	Rostov	190,947	37,483	4,252	12,730	+24.2%^{2}
7	Lokomotiv Moscow	190,613	26,109	6,166	12,708	+20.6%
8	Arsenal Tula	178,897	18,175	7,080	11,926	+9.2%
9	Rubin Kazan	145,593	25,440	3,099	9,706	+0.6%^{3}
10	Ural Yekaterinburg	121,727	26,868	1,345	8,115	+52.6%^{4}
11	Ufa	103,742	12,571	3,827	6,916	+1.5%
12	Dynamo Moscow	101,929	17,133	3,250	6,795	+66.2%^{5}
13	SKA-Khabarovsk	99,680	14,524	2,049	6,645	+78.3%^{5}
14	Anzhi Makhachkala	95,835	10,990	3,100	6,389	−5.7%
15	Tosno	84,805	13,665	1,310	5,654	+197.1%^{6}
16	Amkar Perm	84,499	11,345	1,089	5,633	−21.3%^{7}
	League total	3,347,674	53,359	1,089	13,949	+14.6%

Notes:
1: Zenit played most of last season at Petrovsky Stadium.
2: Rostov played its final three home games of the season at Rostov Arena.
3: Rubin Kazan played part of last season at Central Stadium.
4: Ural played its final three home games of the season at Central Stadium.
5: Team played last season in the Russian Football National League.
6: Tosno played one of its home matches at a neutral venue and played last season in the Russian Football National League at Stadion im. Aleksandra Nevskogo.
7: Amkar Perm played two of its home matches at the away team's stadium.

== Awards ==
=== Top 33 ===
On 29 June 2018, the Russian Football Union approved its list of 33 top players for the 2017–18 Russian Premier League season:

Goalkeepers

1. (Russia) Igor Akinfeev (CSKA Moscow)
2. (Brazil) Guilherme (Lokomotiv Moscow)
3. (Russia) Andrey Lunyov (Zenit Saint Petersburg)

Right backs

1. (Brazil) Mário Fernandes (CSKA Moscow)
2. (Russia) Igor Smolnikov (Zenit Saint Petersburg)
3. (Russia) Vladislav Ignatyev (Lokomotiv Moscow)

Right-centre backs

1. (Georgia (country)) Solomon Kvirkvelia (Lokomotiv Moscow)
2. (Russia) Vasili Berezutski (CSKA Moscow)
3. (Serbia) Branislav Ivanović (Zenit Saint Petersburg)

Left-centre backs

1. (Sweden) Andreas Granqvist (Krasnodar)
2. (Russia) Sergei Ignashevich (CSKA Moscow)
3. (Russia) Georgy Dzhikiya (Spartak Moscow)

Left backs

1. (Italy) Domenico Criscito (Zenit Saint Petersburg)
2. (Russia) Fyodor Kudryashov (Rubin Kazan)
3. (Russia) Dmitri Kombarov (Spartak Moscow)

Defensive midfielders

1. (Russia) Igor Denisov (Lokomotiv Moscow)
2. (Brazil) Fernando (Spartak Moscow)
3. (Sweden) Pontus Wernbloom (CSKA Moscow)

Right midfielders

1. (Russia) Aleksei Miranchuk (Lokomotiv Moscow)
2. (Russia) Roman Zobnin (Spartak Moscow)
3. (Russia) Daler Kuzyaev (Zenit Saint Petersburg)

Centre midfielders

1. (Russia) Aleksandr Golovin (CSKA Moscow)
2. (Russia) Alan Dzagoev (CSKA Moscow)
3. (Russia) Yury Gazinsky (Krasnodar)

Left midfielders

1. (Portugal) Manuel Fernandes (Lokomotiv Moscow)
2. (Netherlands) Quincy Promes (Spartak Moscow)
3. (Russia) Yuri Zhirkov (Zenit Saint Petersburg)

Right forwards

1. (Russia) Aleksandr Kokorin (Zenit Saint Petersburg)
2. (Russia) Artem Dzyuba (Zenit Saint Petersburg)
3. (Russia) Fyodor Chalov (CSKA Moscow)

Left forwards

1. (Russia) Fyodor Smolov (Krasnodar)
2. (Brazil) Luiz Adriano (Spartak Moscow)
3. (Peru) Jefferson Farfán (Lokomotiv Moscow)
