= FC Anzhi-2 Makhachkala =

- Full name: Football Club Anzhi-2 Makhachkala
- Founded: 1995
- Dissolved: 2018
- Manager: Anzur Sadirov
- League: Russian Professional Football League, Zone South
- 2017–18: 16th

FC Anzhi-2 Makhachkala (Russian: Футбо́льный клуб «Анжи́-2» Махачкала́) was a Russian football team from Makhachkala that played in the Russian Professional Football League. It previously played professionally from 1995 to 1997 and in the 2014–15 season, when it took over the spot of FC Dagdizel Kaspiysk. It was founded when FC Argo Kaspiysk team moved to Makhachkala in 1995. They were the farm club of FC Anzhi Makhachkala. When the parent club FC Anzhi was promoted back to the Russian Football Premier League (which hosted its own reserves team competition) after the 2014–15 season, Anzhi-2 was dissolved. It was re-created before the 2017–18 season. It was dissolved yet again after the season.

== Team name and location history ==
- 1995 FC Anzhi-2 Makhachkala
- 1996 FC Anzhi-2 Kaspiysk
- 1997 FC Anzhi-d Makhachkala
- 1998–2000 FC Anzhi-2 Makhachkala
- 2001–2002 played in the reserves team competition of Russian Premier League
- 2003–2005 FC Anzhi-Khazar Makhachkala
- 2006–2007 FC Anzhi-2 Makhachkala
- 2014–2015 FC Anzhi-2 Makhachkala
- 2017–2018 FC Anzhi-2 Makhachkala
