= 2014–15 FC Anzhi Makhachkala season =

Anzhi Makhachkala
2014–15 season
- Chairman: Suleyman Kerimov
- Manager: Sergei Tashuyev
- Stadium: Anzhi-Arena
- National Football League: 2nd
- Russian Cup: Round of 32 vs Zenit St.Petersburg
- FNL Cup: 9th
- Top goalscorer: League: Yannick Boli (15); All: Yannick Boli (16)
- Highest home attendance: 7,000 vs Baltika Kaliningrad (12 July 2014)
- Lowest home attendance: 6,820 vs Sakhalin (6 July 2014)
- Average home league attendance: 6,910 12 July 2014
Home colours	Away colours

The 2014–15 FC Anzhi Makhachkala season was the club's first season back in the Football National League following their relegation in 2014. Anzhi Makhachkala finished the season in 2nd place, earning promotion back to the Russian Premier League at the first opportunity, whilst they also reached the Round of 32 in the Russian Cup where they were knocked out by Zenit St.Petersburg.

== Squad ==
As of match played 30 May 2015

No.	Name	Nationality	Position	Date of birth (age)	Signed from	Signed in	Contract ends	Apps.	Goals
Goalkeepers
1	Aleksandr Krivoruchko	(Russia)	GK	23 September 1984 (aged 30)	Fakel Voronezh	2014		4	0
22	Mikhail Kerzhakov	(Russia)	GK	28 January 1987 (aged 28)	Volga Nizhny Novgorod	2013		64	0
27	Mehdi Jannatov	(Russia)	GK	26 January 1992 (aged 23)	Trainee	2012		1	0
Defenders
2	Aleksei Aravin	(Russia)	DF	9 July 1986 (aged 28)	Tom Tomsk	2014		34	0
2	Aleksei Aravin	(Russia)	DF	9 July 1986 (aged 28)	Tom Tomsk	2014		34	0
3	Ali Gadzhibekov	(Russia)	DF	6 September 1983 (aged 31)	Trainee	2006		159	4
4	Dmitry Aydov	(Russia)	DF	10 April 1982 (aged 33)	Torpedo Moscow	2014		27	2
7	Kamil Agalarov	(Russia)	DF	11 June 1988 (aged 26)	Rostov	2014		151	3
13	Rasim Tagirbekov	(Russia)	DF	4 May 1984 (aged 31)	Trainee	2002		322	20
19	Pyotr Ten	(Russia)	DF	12 July 1992 (aged 22)	loan from CSKA Moscow	2014	2015	4	0
24	Sergei Miroshnichenko	(Russia)	DF	18 July 1982 (aged 32)	Luch-Energiya Vladivostok	2015		4	1
44	Murad Kurbanov	(Russia)	DF	22 March 1992 (aged 23)	Trainee	2010		1	0
57	Magomed Musalov	(Russia)	DF	9 February 1994 (aged 21)	Youth Team	2014		1	0
70	Yuri Udunyan	(Russia)	DF	25 August 1994 (aged 20)	Trainee	2011		1	0
Midfielders
8	Grigori Chirkin	(Russia)	MF	26 February 1986 (aged 29)	Baltika Kaliningrad	2014		28	0
14	Valeriu Ciupercă	(Moldova)	MF	12 June 1992 (aged 22)	Krasnodar	2014		21	0
15	Georgi Zotov	(Russia)	MF	12 January 1990 (aged 25)	Metalurh Donetsk	2014		25	2
17	Sharif Mukhammad	(Russia)	MF	21 March 1990 (aged 25)	Trainee	2010		20	0
18	Roman Kontsedalov	(Russia)	MF	11 May 1986 (aged 29)	Volga Nizhny Novgorod	2015	2015	12	0
20	Amadou Moutari	(Niger)	MF	19 January 1994 (aged 21)	Metalurh Donetsk	2014		31	7
21	Mikhail Komkov	(Russia)	MF	1 October 1984 (aged 30)	Tom Tomsk	2014		19	0
28	Maksim Andreyev	(Russia)	MF	9 January 1988 (aged 27)	Dynamo St.Petersburg	2015		6	0
30	Shamil Gasanov	(Russia)	MF	30 July 1983 (aged 31)	Youth Team	2013		1	0
33	Anvar Gazimagomedov	(Russia)	MF	11 May 1988 (aged 27)	Dagdizel Kaspiysk	2014		15	0
42	Leonardo	(Brazil)	MF	18 March 1992 (aged 23)	Gabala	2014		22	7
60	Magomed Muslimov	(Russia)	MF	3 February 1992 (aged 23)	Dagdizel Kaspiysk	2014		1	0
80	Ismail Korgoloyev	(Russia)	MF	15 March 1994 (aged 21)	Trainee	2012		1	0
87	Ilya Maksimov	(Russia)	MF	2 February 1987 (aged 28)	Krylia Sovetov	2013		48	10
Forwards
9	Shamil Asildarov	(Russia)	FW	18 May 1983 (aged 32)	Luch-Energiya Vladivostok	2014			
94	Yannick Boli	(Ivory Coast)	FW	13 January 1988 (aged 27)	Zorya Luhansk	2014		24	16
95	Magomed Mitrishev	(Russia)	FW	10 September 1992 (aged 22)	loan from Terek Grozny	2014		14	2
96	Dzhamal Dibirgadzhiyev	(Russia)	FW	2 August 1996 (aged 18)	Youth Team	2014		1	1
99	Islamnur Abdulavov	(Russia)	FW	7 March 1994 (aged 21)	Youth Team	2013		15	1
Away on loan
1	Yevgeny Pomazan	(Russia)	GK	31 January 1989 (aged 26)	CSKA Moscow	2011		19	0
2	Andrey Yeshchenko	(Russia)	DF	9 February 1984 (aged 31)	Lokomotiv Moscow	2013		29	0
10	Serder Serderov	(Russia)	FW	10 March 1994 (aged 21)	CSKA Moscow	2012		47	4
25	Valery Kichin	(Kyrgyzstan)	DF	12 October 1992 (aged 22)	Volga Nizhny Novgorod	2014		12	0
37	Ewerton	(Brazil)	DF	23 March 1989 (aged 26)	Corinthians Alagoano	2012		38	2
Players who left during the season
88	Oleksandr Aliyev	(Ukraine)	MF	3 February 1985 (aged 30)	Dynamo Kyiv	2014		16	3

== Transfers ==
=== In ===
Date	Position	Nationality	Name	From	Fee	Ref.
1 July 2014	MF	(Russia)	Georgi Zotov	Metalurh Donetsk	Undisclosed	
2 July 2014	GK	(Russia)	Aleksandr Krivoruchko	Fakel Voronezh	Undisclosed	
2 July 2014	DF	(Kyrgyzstan)	Valerii Kichin	Ufa	Undisclosed	
2 July 2014	DF	(Russia)	Aleksei Aravin	Tom Tomsk	Undisclosed	
2 July 2014	MF	(Moldova)	Valeriu Ciupercă	Krasnodar	Undisclosed	
2 July 2014	MF	(Niger)	Amadou Moutari	Metalurh Donetsk	Undisclosed	
2 July 2014	MF	(Russia)	Grigori Chirkin	Baltika Kaliningrad	Undisclosed	
2 July 2014	FW	(Russia)	Shamil Asildarov	Luch-Energiya Vladivostok	Undisclosed	
10 August 2014	MF	(Brazil)	Leonardo	Gabala	Undisclosed	
29 August 2014	DF	(Russia)	Dmitry Aydov	Torpedo Moscow	Undisclosed	
29 August 2014	FW	(Ivory Coast)	Yannick Boli	Zorya Luhansk	Undisclosed	
1 September 2014	MF	(Russia)	Mikhail Komkov	Tom Tomsk	Undisclosed	
2 September 2014	MF	(Georgia (country))	Levan Gvazava	Neftchi Fergana	Undisclosed	

=== Loans in ===
Date from	Position	Nationality	Name	From	Date to	Ref.
11 June 2014	DF	(Russia)	Pyotr Ten	CSKA Moscow	End of season	
20 June 2014	FW	(Russia)	Magomed Mitrishev	Terek Grozny	End of season	
29 December 2014	MF	(Russia)	Maksim Andreyev	Dynamo St.Petersburg	End of season	
17 January 2015	MF	(Russia)	Roman Kontsedalov	Volga Nizhny Novgorod	End of season	
27 January 2015	DF	(Russia)	Sergei Miroshnichenko	Luch-Energiya Vladivostok	End of season	

=== Out ===
Date	Position	Nationality	Name	To	Fee	Ref.
21 June 2013	DF	(Moldova)	Alexandru Epureanu	İstanbul BB	Undisclosed	
21 June 2013	MF	(Uzbekistan)	Odil Ahmedov	Krasnodar	Undisclosed	
21 June 2013	FW	(Argentina)	Gustavo Leschuk	Wydad Casablanca	Undisclosed	
21 June 2013	MF	(Azerbaijan)	Rizvan Umarov	Dynamo St.Petersburg	Undisclosed	
21 June 2013	FW	(Russia)	Nikita Burmistrov	Krasnodar	Undisclosed	

=== Loans out ===
Date from	Position	Nationality	Name	To	Date to	Ref.
2 July 2014	GK	(Russia)	Yevgeny Pomazan	Kuban Krasnodar	End of season	
11 July 2014	DF	(Russia)	Andrey Yeshchenko	Kuban Krasnodar	End of season	
24 January 2015	DF	(Brazil)	Ewerton	Sporting CP	End of season	
29 January 2015	DF	(Kyrgyzstan)	Valerii Kichin	Tyumen	End of season	
4 February 2015	FW	(Russia)	Serder Serderov	Krylia Sovetov	End of season	

=== Released ===
Date	Position	Nationality	Name	Joined	Date	Ref.
1 August 2014	DF	(Cameroon)	Benoît Angbwa	Olympique Grande-Synthe	March 2016	
16 January 2015	MF	(Ukraine)	Oleksandr Aliyev	Rukh Lviv		
12 February 2015	DF	(Georgia (country))	Gia Grigalava	Pafos		

=== Trials ===
Date From	Position	Nationality	Name	Last club	Date To	Ref.
June 2014	FW	(Germany)	Savio Nsereko	Atyrau		

== Friendlies ==
19 June 2014	Anzhi Makhachkala	8–0	Gazprom transgaz Stavropol Ryzdvyany	Kislovodsk, Russia
16:30 MSK (UTC+4)	Trialist 39'; Tagirbekov 42'; Umarov 60', 87'; Abdulavov 63'; M. Musalov 72'; T. Kadimov 78'; Trialist 81'	Summary		Stadium: Central Stadium

27 June 2014	Anzhi Makhachkala (Russia)	0–1	(Slovakia) Senica	Austria
20:00 MSK (UTC+4)		Summary	Kosorin 79'	Referee: Thomas Junac (Austria)

30 June 2014	Anzhi Makhachkala (Russia)	0–0	(Romania) Universitatea Cluj	Neumarkt an der Ybbs, Austria
18:00 MSK (UTC+4)		Summary		Referee: Elios Rustin (Austria)

1 July 2014	Anzhi Makhachkala (Russia)	1–2	(Austria) Red Bull Salzburg	Austria
21:00 MSK (UTC+4)	Tagirbekov 63'	Summary	Kampl 86'; Quaschner 90'	Referee: Thomas Haltsner (Austria)

9 September 2014	CSKA Moscow	1–2	Anzhi Makhachkala	Moscow
MSK (UTC+4)	Natcho 89'	Summary	Abdulavov 68'; Komkov 90'	Referee: Denis Zabotin

19 January 2015	Lechia Gdańsk (Poland)	4–1	(Russia) Anzhi Makhachkala	Antalya, Turkey
MSK (UTC+3)	Kazlauskas 24'; Friesenbichler 49'; Nazário 54', 61'	Summary	Boli (red card) 34'; Asildarov 73'; Mitrishev (yellow card) 80'

25 January 2015	Universitatea Craiova (Romania)	0–1	(Russia) Anzhi Makhachkala	Antalya, Turkey
MSK (UTC+3)	Briceag (yellow card) 13'; Balut (yellow card) 32'	Summary	Maksimov (red card) 28'; Gadzhibekov (yellow card) 40'; Gazimagomedov (yellow card) 53'; Andreyev 62'; Aydov (yellow card) 83'

31 January 2015	SV Grödig (Austria)	1–1	(Russia) Anzhi Makhachkala	Antalya, Turkey
MSK (UTC+3)	Nutz 27'; Cabrera (yellow card) 42'; Kershbaum (yellow card) 61'	Summary	Aravin (yellow card) 60'; Aydov (yellow card) 73'; Moutari (red card) 81'; Asildarov 86'	Referee: Belek

1 February 2015	Lech Poznań (Poland)	2–2 (3–4 p)	(Russia) Anzhi Makhachkala	Antalya, Turkey
MSK (UTC+3)	Ciupercă (yellow card) 41'; Komkov 79'; Djamaloudinov 88'; Miroshnichenko (yellow card) 89'	Summary	Hamalainen 20'; Lovrencsics 90'

8 February 2015	Partizan (Serbia)	2–2	(Russia) Anzhi Makhachkala	Belek, Turkey
18:00 MSK (UTC+3)	Ninković 17'; Marinković 36'; Ćirković (yellow card) 73'	Summary	Leonardo 22', 38'	Referee: Aziz Asimov (Uzbekistan)

14 February 2015	Žilina (Slovakia)	1–1	(Russia) Anzhi Makhachkala	Belek, Turkey
17:00 MSK (UTC+3)	William Oliveira 28'; Čmelík (yellow card) 76'; Jelić (yellow card) 82'; Hučko (yellow card) 83'	Summary	Kontsedalov (yellow card) 30' (yellow-red card) 85'; Asildarov (yellow card) 49' (goal) 69'; Tagirbekov (yellow card) 82'; Aydov (yellow card) 87'	Referee: Viktor Shimusik (Belarus)

19 February 2015	Aktobe (Kazakhstan)	2–2	(Russia) Anzhi Makhachkala	Belek, Turkey
17:00 MSK (UTC+3)	Neco 39', 71'; Aravin (yellow card) 85'	Summary	Boli 22', 30'; D. Miroshnichenko (yellow card) 56'; Korobkin (yellow card) 60'

26 February 2015	Krasnodar	2–0	Anzhi Makhachkala	Belek, Turkey
19:00 MSK (UTC+3)	Joãozinho 36'; Ari (yellow card) 45'; Mamayev (yellow card) 56'; Martynovich 76'	Summary	Aydov (yellow card) 68'	Referee: Igor Krutoy

28 February 2015	Spartak Moscow	1–0	Anzhi Makhachkala	Belek, Turkey
16:00 MSK (UTC+3)	Davydov 44'	Summary		Referee: Igor Circle

3 March 2015	Anzhi Makhachkala (Russia)	0–1	(Belarus) Shakhtyor Soligorsk	Belek, Turkey
18:00 MSK (UTC+3)	Asildarov (yellow card) 52'	Summary	Yanush 55'	Stadium: Regnum Golf Resort; Referee: Kirill Pilipovets (Belarus)

5 March 2015	Anzhi Makhachkala (Russia)	2–1	(Kazakhstan) Kyzylzhar	Belek, Turkey
18:00 MSK (UTC+3)	Kontsedalov 41'; Leonardo 49'	Summary	Chudinov 82'

=== FNL Cup ===
Team	Pld	W	D	L	GF	GA	GD	Pts
Sibir Novosibirsk	3	2	0	1	3	2	+1	6
Shinnik Yaroslavl	3	1	1	1	1	1	0	4
Anzhi Makhachkala	3	1	1	1	1	2	−1	4
Tosno	3	1	0	2	2	2	0	3

12 February 2015 1	Anzhi Makhachkala	0–2	Sibir Novosibirsk	Belek, Turkey
11:15 MSK (UTC+3)	Abdulavov (yellow card) 49'; Baysongurov (yellow card) 61'; Janet (yellow card) 73'	Summary	Ivanov 3'; Nagibin 74'	Referee: Vitali Meshkov

14 February 2015 2	Shinnik Yaroslavl	0–0	Anzhi Makhachkala	Belek, Turkey
11:15 MSK (UTC+3)	N'Dri (yellow card) 45'; Sirota (yellow card) 86'	Summary	Gazimagomedov (yellow card) 40'; Ten (yellow card) 68'; Kurbanov (yellow card) 79'	Referee: Sergey Lapochkin

16 February 2015 3	Anzhi Makhachkala	1–0	Tosno	Belek, Turkey
11:15 MSK (UTC+3)	T. Dzhamalutdinov 71'	Summary		Referee: Alex Eskov

==== Final Series ====
19 February 2015 Playoff	Anzhi Makhachkala	3–0	Volga Nizhny Novgorod	Belek, Turkey
17:15 MSK (UTC+3)	Dibirgadzhiev 34'; Abdulavov 66'; Udunyan (yellow card) 70'; Omar 80'	Summary	Jalilov (yellow card) 30'; Shelyakov (yellow card) 89'	Referee: Cyril Levnikov

22 February 2015 9th Place Match	Anzhi Makhachkala	1–1 (4–2 p)	Yenisey Krasnoyarsk	Belek, Turkey
MSK (UTC+3)	Korgoloev (yellow card) 7'; Dibirgadzhiev 43'	Summary	A. Lomakin (yellow card) 38'; Magadiyev (yellow card) 53'; Chadov 64'	Referee: Alexander Egorov

== Competitions ==
=== Overview ===
Competition	First match	Last match	Starting round	Final position	Record							
Competition	First match	Last match	Starting round	Final position	Pld	W	D	L	GF	GA	GD	Win %
Football National League	6 July 2014	30 May 2015	Matchday 1	2nd	34	22	5	7	60	22	+38	64.71
Russian Cup	30 August 2014	24 September 2014	Fourth round	Round of 32	2	1	0	1	5	3	+2	50.00
Total					36	23	5	8	65	25	+40	63.89

Last updated: 30 May 2015
Source: See Competitions

=== Football National League ===
==== Results summary ====
Overall								Home						Away					
Pld	W	D	L	GF	GA	GD	Pts	W	D	L	GF	GA	GD	W	D	L	GF	GA	GD
34	22	5	7	60	22	+38	71	13	3	1	39	10	+29	9	2	6	21	12	+9

Last updated: 15 May 2014.
Source: See Results

==== Results by round ====
Round	1	2	3	4	5	6	7	8	9	10	11	12	13	14	15	16	17	18	19	20	21	22	23	24	25	26	27	28	29	30	31	32	33	34
Ground	H	H	A	H	A	H	A	H	H	A	H	A	H	A	A	H	A	A	H	A	H	A	H	A	H	A	H	A	H	A	H	A	H	A
Result	W	D	W	W	L	W	L	W	D	D	W	L	W	W	W	L	W	W	W	W	W	W	W	L	W	D	W	L	W	L	W	W	D	W
Position	4	6	1	1	2	1	5	3	5	5	5	4	4	3	2	3	1	1	1	1	1	1	1	1	1	1	1	1	1	1	1	1	2	2

Updated to match(es) played on 30 May 2015. Source: See Results
A = Away; H = Home; W = Win; D = Draw; L = Loss

==== Results ====
6 July 2014 1	Anzhi Makhachkala	1–0	Sakhalin Yuzhno-Sakhalinsk	Kaspiysk
20:00 MSK (UTC+4)	Asildarov 33'; Gadzhibekov (yellow card) 36'	Summary		Stadium: Anzhi-Arena; Attendance: 6,820; Referee: Mikhail Vilkov

12 July 2014 2	Anzhi Makhachkala	0–0	Baltika Kaliningrad	Kaspiysk
20:00 MSK (UTC+4)	Asildarov (yellow card) 60'; Moutari (yellow card) 89'	Summary		Stadium: Anzhi-Arena; Attendance: 7,000; Referee: Sergey Kulikov

19 July 2014 3	Volga Nizhny Novgorod	1–3	Anzhi Makhachkala	Nizhny Novgorod
16:00 MSK (UTC+4)	Minosyan (yellow card) 53' Kukharchuk 82'	Summary	Asildarov (yellow card) 23' (goal) 55'; Tagirbekov (yellow card) 51'; Gadzhibekov 70'; Serderov 81'	Stadium: Lokomotiv Stadium; Attendance: 450; Referee: Sergey Karasev

27 July 2014 4	Anzhi Makhachkala	2–0	Volgar Astrakhan	Kaspiysk
20:00 MSK (UTC+4)	Maksimov 48'; Moutari 90'	Summary		Stadium: Anzhi-Arena; Attendance: 6,500; Referee: Sergey Ivanov

3 August 2014 5	Gazovik Orenburg	1–0	Anzhi Makhachkala	Orenburg
17:00 MSK (UTC+4)	Akhmedov 8'; Breyev (yellow card) 36'	Summary	Agalarov (yellow card) 34'; Mitrishev (yellow card) 73'; Tagirbekov (yellow card) 85'	Stadium: Gazovik Stadium; Attendance: 3,100; Referee: Igor Nizovtsev

10 August 2014 6	Anzhi Makhachkala	5–1	Dynamo St. Petersburg	Kaspiysk
20:00 MSK (UTC+4)	Mitrishev 13'; Moutari 20', 90+4'; Chirkin (yellow card) 52'; Maksimov 68', 89'	Summary	Andreyev 29'	Stadium: Anzhi-Arena; Attendance: 8,000; Referee: Artem Chistyakov

17 August 2014 7	Yenisey Krasnoyarsk	1–0	Anzhi Makhachkala	Krasnoyarsk
11:00 MSK (UTC+4)	Gultyayev 62'; Skvortsov (yellow card) 85'	Summary	Aravin (yellow card) 82'	Stadium: Central Stadium; Attendance: 5,100; Referee: Anton Anopa

24 August 2014 8	Anzhi Makhachkala	2–1	Krylia Sovetov	Kaspiysk
20:00 MSK (UTC+4)	Ewerton (yellow card) 52'; Aliyev 54'; Mitrishev 72'; Aravin (yellow card) 82'	Summary	Kornilenko (yellow card) 25'; Chochiyev 75'	Stadium: Anzhi-Arena; Attendance: 11,450; Referee: Aleksei Matyunin

13 September 204 10	Anzhi Makhachkala	1–1	SKA-Energiya	Kaspiysk
19:00 MSK (UTC+4)	Moutari (yellow card) 14'; Gadzhibekov 26' (yellow card) 32'	Summary	Kupchin (yellow card) 16'; Gogua 38' (pen.) (yellow card) 87'; Udaly (yellow card) 47'; Nikiforov (yellow card) 76'; Kozorez (yellow card) 90'	Stadium: Anzhi-Arena; Attendance: 7,500; Referee: Aleksey Sukhoy

20 September 2014 11	Khimik Dzerzhinsk	0–0	Anzhi Makhachkala	Dzerzhinsk
15:00 MSK (UTC+4)	Dzhikiya (yellow card) 54'; Samsonov (yellow card) 76'	Summary	Zotov (yellow card) 72'; Moutari (yellow card) 75'	Stadium: Khimik Stadium; Attendance: 3,000; Referee: Stanislav Vasilyev

29 September 2014 12	Anzhi Makhachkala	3–0	Sokol Saratov	Kaspiysk
19:00 MSK (UTC+4)	Boli 19', 28'; Moutari 58'	Summary	Korotayev (yellow card) 69'; Dutov (yellow card) 78'	Stadium: Anzhi-Arena; Attendance: 5,100; Referee: Cyril Levnikov

5 October 2014 13	Tom Tomsk	1–0	Anzhi Makhachkala	Tomsk
12:00 MSK (UTC+4)	Nyakhaychyk (yellow card) 31'; Bazhenov 78'	Summary	Aravin (yellow card) 37'; Ciupercă (yellow card) 48' (yellow-red card) 65'; Aydov (yellow card) 56'	Stadium: Trud Stadium; Attendance: 4,200; Referee: Igor Fedotov

11 October 2014 14	Anzhi Makhachkala	1–0	Tosno	Kaspiysk
17:00 MSK (UTC+4)	Boli 13'; Aliyev (yellow card) 62'	Summary	Ponomaryov (yellow card) 62'; Revishvili (yellow card) 77'; Smirnov (yellow card) 84'	Stadium: Anzhi-Arena; Attendance: 6,400; Referee: Evgeny Turbin

15 October 2014 9	Luch-Energiya	1–2	Anzhi Makhachkala	Vladivostok
11:00 MSK (UTC+4)	Miroshnichenko (yellow card) 37'; Prokofyev (yellow card) 57'; Averyanov (yellow card) 60'; Klopkov (yellow card) 64'	Summary	Boli 11' (yellow card) 45'; Komkov (yellow card) 63'; Asildarov (yellow card) 81'	Stadium: Dynamo Stadium; Attendance: 2,600; Referee: Vladimir Seldyakov
Note: Match originally scheduled for 6 September 2014.

19 October 2014 15	Tyumen	0–1	Anzhi Makhachkala	Tyumen
18:30 MSK (UTC+4)		Summary	Boli 26'; Komkov (yellow card) 60'	Stadium: Geolog Stadium; Attendance: 2,000; Referee: Kirill Levnikov

25 October 2014 16	Anzhi Makhachkala	1–3	Sibir Novosibirsk	Kaspiysk
17:00 MSK (UTC+4)	Boli 10'; Komkov (yellow card) 12'; Gazimagomedov (yellow card) 34'	Summary	Zhitnev 28' (yellow card) 48'; Vychodil 37'; Ivanov 40'; Margasov (yellow card) 57'; Cebotaru (yellow card) 90'	Stadium: Anzhi-Arena; Attendance: 2,500; Referee: Timur Arslanbekov

2 November 2014 17	Shinnik Yaroslavl	0–1	Anzhi Makhachkala	Yaroslavl
16:00 MSK (UTC+3)	Lamanje (yellow card) 20'; Gridnev (yellow card) 54'	Summary	Aliyev 60' (pen.); Gadzhibekov (yellow card) 90'	Stadium: Shinnik Stadium; Attendance: 1,900; Referee: Vasiliy Kazartsev

8 November 2014 18	Baltika Kaliningrad	2–3	Anzhi Makhachkala	Kaliningrad
17:00 MSK (UTC+3)	Kalenkovich (yellow card) 78'; Tsukanov (yellow card) 80'; Zinovich 82'; Zjuzins 87'	Summary	Tsukanov 14' (o.g.); Moutari 17'; Komkov (yellow card) 28'; Boli (yellow card) 42'; Chirkin (yellow card) 66'; Maksimov 81'	Stadium: Baltika Stadium; Attendance: 1,600; Referee: Vitaly Rushakov

14 November 2014 19	Anzhi Makhachkala	2–0	Volga Nizhny Novgorod	Kaspiysk
19:00 MSK (UTC+3)	Boli 14'; Ciupercă (yellow card) 23'; Maksimov 65'	Summary	Kurayev (yellow card) 35'; Kozlov (yellow card) 39'; Shelton (yellow card) 68'	Stadium: Anzhi-Arena; Attendance: 6,900; Referee: Vladislav Bezborodov

18 November 2014 20	Volgar Astrakhan	0–3	Anzhi Makhachkala	Astrakhan
19:30 MSK (UTC+3)		Summary	Boli 10'; Ciupercă (yellow card) 53'; Moutari 68'; Aliyev 89'	Stadium: Central Stadium; Attendance: 3,500; Referee: Andrey Fisenko

22 November 2014 21	Anzhi Makhachkala	2–1	Gazovik Orenburg	Kaspiysk
16:00 MSK (UTC+3)	Zotov 6'; Ciupercă (yellow card) 24'; Chirkin (yellow card) 53'; Boli 82'; Maksimov (yellow card) 89'	Summary	Breyev (yellow card) 61'; Druzin 63'; Poluyakhtov (yellow card) 76'; Malykh (yellow card) 81'	Stadium: Anzhi-Arena; Attendance: 4,500; Referee: Vladimir Moskalyov

14 March 2015 22	Dynamo St. Petersburg	0–2	Anzhi Makhachkala	Saint Petersburg
17:00 MSK (UTC+3)	Petukhov (yellow card) 36'; Rogov (yellow card) 39'	Summary	Maksimov 20'; Boli 34' (yellow card) 64'; Zotov (yellow card) 43'; Gadzhibekov (yellow card) 87'; Chirkin (yellow card) 90'	Stadium: Petrovsky Stadium; Attendance: 1,800; Referee: Stanislav Vasilyev

18 March 2015 23	Anzhi Makhachkala	5–1	Yenisey Krasnoyarsk	Kaspiysk
19:00 MSK (UTC+3)	Maksimov 3'; Boli 17', 30'; Zotov 20'; Miroshnichenko (yellow card) 61' (yellow-red card) 75'; Leonardo 84'	Summary	Gultyayev 14'; Kharitonov (yellow card) 42'	Stadium: Anzhi-Arena; Attendance: 8,650; Referee: Roman Chernov

22 March 2015 24	Krylia Sovetov	1–0	Anzhi Makhachkala	Samara
17:00 MSK (UTC+3)	Pomerko (yellow card) 42'; Jahović 43' (yellow card) 58'; Konyukhov (yellow card) 90'	Summary	Moutari (yellow card) 38'	Stadium: Metallurg Stadium; Attendance: 9,870; Referee: Vladimir Moskalyov

29 March 2015 25	Anzhi Makhachkala	2–0	Luch-Energiya	Kaspiysk
19:00 MSK (UTC+3)	Gadzhibekov (yellow card) 5'; Maksimov 16'; Leonardo 45'; Chirkin (yellow card) 76'	Summary	Nasadyuk (yellow card) 8'; Lebedev (yellow card) 78'	Stadium: Anzhi-Arena; Attendance: 5,638; Referee: Timur Arslanbekov

5 April 2015 26	SKA-Energiya	1–1	Anzhi Makhachkala	Khabarovsk
17:00 MSK (UTC+3)	Nathan Júnior 4' (yellow card) 32'; Gogua (yellow card) 65'; Trusevych (yellow card) 87'; Aladashvili (yellow card) 89'	Summary	Aydov 25' (pen.); Boli (yellow card) 45'	Stadium: Lenin Stadium; Attendance: 800; Referee: Kirill Levnikov

12 April 2015 27	Anzhi Makhachkala	2–0	Khimik Dzerzhinsk	Kaspiysk
18:00 MSK (UTC+3)	Aydov 70' (pen.); Maksimov 82' (yellow card) 82'	Summary	Chuvayev (yellow card) 69'; Kasyan (yellow card) 72'; Tagilov (yellow card) 78'	Stadium: Anzhi-Arena; Attendance: 7,500; Referee: Roman Galimov

19 April 2015 28	Sokol Saratov	2–0	Anzhi Makhachkala	Saratov
17:00 MSK (UTC+3)	Gorbatyuk 36'; Yakovlyev (yellow card) 64' (goal) 80'; Suslov (yellow card) 90'	Summary	Kontsedalov (yellow card) 23'; Zotov (yellow card) 29'; Chirkin (yellow card) 34'; Leonardo (yellow card) 65'	Stadium: Lokomotiv Stadium; Attendance: 7,400; Referee: Andrey Fisenko

25 April 2015 29	Anzhi Makhachkala	6–0	Tom Tomsk	Kaspiysk
14:00 MSK (UTC+3)	Aravin (yellow card) 31'; Leonardo 33'; Boli 55', 68'; Miroshnichenko 63'; Asildarov 75', 89'	Summary	Dzhioyev (yellow card) 43'; Terentyev (yellow card) 52' (red card) 83'; Nyakhaychyk (yellow card) 73'	Stadium: Anzhi-Arena; Attendance: 9,956; Referee: Alexey Nikolaev

2 May 2015 31	Tosno	1–0	Anzhi Makhachkala	Tikhvin
MSK (UTC+3)	Smirnov (yellow card) 56'; Tetrashvili (yellow card) 84'; Berkhamov 89'	Summary	Chirkin (yellow card) 50'; Zotov (yellow card) 60'	Stadium: Stadion Kirovets; Attendance: 2,460; Referee: Sergey Karasev

10 May 2015 31	Anzhi Makhachkala	3–1	Tyumen	Kaspiysk
20:00 MSK (UTC+3)	Maksimov 17'; Aravin (yellow card) 36'; Gadzhibekov (yellow card) 45'; Boli (yellow card) 55'; Leonardo 72', 82'	Summary	Samsonov (yellow card) 36'; Klenkin 57'; Bagayev (yellow card) 61'; Telenkov (yellow card) 89'	Stadium: Anzhi-Arena; Attendance: 8,900; Referee: Igor Fedotov

16 May 2015 32	Sibir Novosibirsk	0–2	Anzhi Makhachkala	Novosibirsk
13:00 MSK (UTC+3)	Svezhov (yellow card) 27'; Vychodil (yellow card) 48'; Cebotaru (yellow card) 55'; Larents (yellow card) 65'	Summary	Leonardo 17'; Boli 49' (pen.); Zotov (yellow card) 56'; Kontsedalov (yellow card) 70'	Stadium: Spartak Stadium; Attendance: 3,000; Referee: Igor Nizovtsev

23 May 2015 33	Anzhi Makhachkala	1–1	Shinnik Yaroslavl	Kaspiysk
18:00 MSK (UTC+3)	Chirkin (yellow card) 20' (yellow-red card) 89'; Leonardo 75' (yellow card) 75'; Boli (yellow card) 90'; Aravin (red card) 90'	Summary	Gridnev (yellow card) 16'; Deobald 24'; Malyarov (yellow card) 26'; N'Dri (yellow card) 76'; Nizamutdinov (yellow card) 81'	Stadium: Anzhi-Arena; Attendance: 13,500; Referee: Aleksei Matyunin

30 May 2015 34	Sakhalin Yuzhno-Sakhalinsk	0–3	Anzhi Makhachkala	Yuzhno-Sakhalinsk
14:00 MSK (UTC+3)	Mamayev (yellow card) 37'; Satalkin (yellow card) 75'; Mikhalyov (yellow card) 80'	Summary	Dibirgadzhiev 7'; Abdulavov 47'; Krivoruchko (yellow card) 73'; Udunyan 81'	Stadium: Spartak Stadium; Attendance: 2,500; Referee: Evgeny Turbin

==== League table ====
Pos	Team	Pld	W	D	L	GF	GA	GD	Pts	Promotion or relegation
1	Krylia Sovetov Samara (P)	34	22	7	5	54	19	+35	73	Promotion to Premier League
2	Anzhi Makhachkala (P)	34	22	5	7	60	22	+38	71	Promotion to Premier League
3	Tosno	34	20	5	9	50	36	+14	65	Qualification for promotion play-offs
4	Tom Tomsk	34	18	10	6	57	34	+23	64	Qualification for promotion play-offs
5	Gazovik Orenburg	34	15	13	6	52	31	+21	58	

Source: FNL, Soccerway
Rules for classification: 1st points; 2nd matches won; 3rd head-to-head (points, matches won, goal difference, goals scored, away goals scored); 4th goal difference; 5th goals scored; 6th away goals scored
(P) Promoted

=== Russian Cup ===
30 August 2014 Fourth round	Chernomorets Novorossiysk	1–4	Anzhi Makhachkala	Novorossiysk
18:00 MSK (UTC+4)	Shakhov 62'; Lusikyan (yellow card) 77'	Report	Asildarov 2', 50'; Aravin (yellow card) 8'; Moutari 36'; Abdulavov 58'	Stadium: Trud; Attendance: 5,000; Referee: Oleg Sokolov

24 September 2014 Round of 32	Anzhi Makhachkala	1–2	Zenit St.Petersburg	Kaspiysk
19:00 MSK (UTC+4)	Boli 22'; Ciupercă (yellow card) 39'; Aravin (yellow card) 57'	Report	Shatov 30'; Neto (yellow card) 44'; Rondón 71'	Stadium: Anzhi Arena; Attendance: 14,500; Referee: Vladimir Moskaliev

== Squad statistics ==
As of Match played 30 May 2015

=== Appearances and goals ===
No.	Pos	Nat	Player	Total		Football National League		Russian Cup	
No.	Pos	Nat	Player	Apps	Goals	Apps	Goals	Apps	Goals
1	GK	(Russia) RUS	Aleksandr Krivoruchko	4	0	2+1	0	1	0
2	DF	(Russia) RUS	Aleksei Aravin	34	0	31+1	0	2	0
3	DF	(Russia) RUS	Ali Gadzhibekov	33	2	31	2	2	0
4	DF	(Russia) RUS	Dmitry Aydov	27	2	25+1	2	1	0
7	DF	(Russia) RUS	Kamil Agalarov	18	0	12+5	0	0+1	0
8	MF	(Russia) RUS	Grigori Chirkin	28	0	26	0	2	0
9	FW	(Russia) RUS	Shamil Asildarov	31	7	12+17	5	1+1	2
13	DF	(Russia) RUS	Rasim Tagirbekov	11	0	7+4	0	0	0
14	MF	(Moldova) MDA	Valeriu Ciupercă	21	0	15+4	0	2	0
15	MF	(Russia) RUS	Georgi Zotov	25	2	22+2	2	1	0
17	MF	(Russia) RUS	Sharif Mukhammad	6	0	0+6	0	0	0
18	MF	(Russia) RUS	Roman Kontsedalov	12	0	12	0	0	0
19	DF	(Russia) RUS	Pyotr Ten	4	0	1+2	0	1	0
20	MF	(Niger) NIG	Amadou Moutari	31	7	27+2	6	2	1
21	MF	(Russia) RUS	Mikhail Komkov	19	0	10+9	0	0	0
22	GK	(Russia) RUS	Mikhail Kerzhakov	34	0	32	0	1+1	0
24	DF	(Russia) RUS	Sergei Miroshnichenko	4	1	2+2	1	0	0
27	GK	(Russia) RUS	Mehdi Jannatov	1	0	0+1	0	0	0
28	MF	(Russia) RUS	Maksim Andreyev	6	0	2+4	0	0	0
30	MF	(Russia) RUS	Shamil Gasanov	1	0	1	0	0	0
33	MF	(Russia) RUS	Anvar Gazimagomedov	15	0	7+7	0	0+1	0
42	MF	(Brazil) BRA	Leonardo	22	7	20+1	7	1	0
44	DF	(Russia) RUS	Murad Kurbanov	1	0	1	0	0	0
57	DF	(Russia) RUS	Magomed Musalov	1	0	1	0	0	0
60	MF	(Russia) RUS	Magomed Muslimov	1	0	0+1	0	0	0
70	DF	(Russia) RUS	Yuri Udunyan	1	1	1	1	0	0
80	MF	(Russia) RUS	Ismail Korgoloyev	1	0	0+1	0	0	0
87	MF	(Russia) RUS	Ilya Maksimov	33	10	31	10	2	0
94	FW	(Ivory Coast) CIV	Yannick Boli	24	16	21+2	15	1	1
95	FW	(Russia) RUS	Magomed Mitrishev	14	2	8+6	2	0	0
96	FW	(Russia) RUS	Dzhamal Dibirgadzhiyev	1	1	1	1	0	0
99	FW	(Russia) RUS	Islamnur Abdulavov	11	2	1+9	1	0+1	1
Players away from the club on loan:
10	FW	(Russia) RUS	Serder Serderov	12	1	1+9	1	1+1	0
25	DF	(Kyrgyzstan) KGZ	Valery Kichin	12	0	2+10	0	0	0
37	DF	(Brazil) BRA	Ewerton	6	0	3+2	0	1	0
Players who appeared for Anzhi Makhachkala that left during the season:
88	MF	(Ukraine) UKR	Oleksandr Aliyev	16	3	6+9	3	0+1	0

=== Goal scorers ===
Place	Position	Nation	Number	Name	Football National League	Russian Cup	Total
1	FW	(Ivory Coast)	94	Yannick Boli	15	1	16
2	MF	(Russia)	87	Ilya Maksimov	10	0	10
3	MF	(Brazil)	42	Leonardo	7	0	7
3	MF	(Niger)	20	Amadou Moutari	6	1	7
3	FW	(Russia)	9	Shamil Asildarov	5	2	7
6	MF	(Ukraine)	88	Oleksandr Aliyev	3	0	3
7	FW	(Russia)	95	Magomed Mitrishev	2	0	2
7	DF	(Russia)	3	Ali Gadzhibekov	2	0	2
7	MF	(Russia)	15	Georgi Zotov	2	0	2
7	DF	(Russia)	4	Dmitry Aydov	2	0	2
7	FW	(Russia)	99	Islamnur Abdulavov	1	1	2
11	FW	(Russia)	10	Serder Serderov	1	0	1
11	DF	(Russia)	24	Sergei Miroshnichenko	1	0	1
11	FW	(Russia)	96	Dzhamal Dibirgadzhiyev	1	0	1
11	DF	(Russia)	70	Yuri Udunyan	1	0	1
11				Own goal	1	0	1
				TOTALS	60	5	65

=== Clean Sheets ===
Place	Position	Nation	Number	Name	Football National League	Russian Cup	Total
1	GK	(Russia)	22	Mikhail Kerzhakov	14	0	14
2	GK	(Russia)	1	Aleksandr Krivoruchko	2	0	2
3	GK	(Russia)	27	Mehdi Jannatov	1	0	1
				TOTALS	16	0	16

Krivoruchko & Jannatov both played in Anzhi's 1-0 victory over Sakhalin Yuzhno-Sakhalinsk on 30 May 2015

=== Disciplinary record ===
Number	Nation	Position	Name	Football National League		Russian Cup		Total	
Number	Nation	Position	Name	Yellow card	Red card	Yellow card	Red card	Yellow card	Red card
1	(Russia)	GK	Aleksandr Krivoruchko	1	0	0	0	1	0
2	(Russia)	DF	Aleksei Aravin	5	1	2	0	7	1
3	(Russia)	DF	Ali Gadzhibekov	6	0	0	0	6	0
4	(Russia)	DF	Dmitry Aydov	1	0	0	0	1	0
7	(Russia)	DF	Kamil Agalarov	1	0	0	0	1	0
8	(Russia)	MF	Grigori Chirkin	9	1	0	0	9	1
9	(Russia)	FW	Shamil Asildarov	2	0	0	0	2	0
13	(Russia)	DF	Rasim Tagirbekov	2	0	0	0	2	0
14	(Moldova)	MF	Valeriu Ciupercă	5	1	1	0	6	1
15	(Russia)	MF	Georgi Zotov	5	0	0	0	5	0
18	(Russia)	MF	Roman Kontsedalov	2	0	0	0	2	0
20	(Niger)	MF	Amadou Moutari	4	0	0	0	4	0
21	(Russia)	MF	Mikhail Komkov	4	0	0	0	4	0
24	(Russia)	DF	Sergei Miroshnichenko	2	1	0	0	2	1
33	(Russia)	MF	Anvar Gazimagomedov	1	0	0	0	1	0
42	(Brazil)	MF	Leonardo	2	0	0	0	2	0
87	(Russia)	MF	Ilya Maksimov	2	0	0	0	2	0
94	(Ivory Coast)	FW	Yannick Boli	6	0	0	0	6	0
95	(Russia)	FW	Magomed Mitrishev	1	0	0	0	1	0
Players away on loan:
37	(Brazil)	DF	Ewerton	1	0	0	0	1	0
Players who left Anzhi Makhachkala during the season:
88	(Ukraine)	MF	Oleksandr Aliyev	1	0	0	0	1	0
			TOTALS	62	4	3	0	65	4
