= 2015–16 FC Anzhi Makhachkala season =

Anzhi Makhachkala
2015–16 season
- Chairman: Suleyman Kerimov
- Manager: Yuri Semin (until 29 September 2015); Ruslan Agalarov(caretaker) (from 29 September 2015)
- Stadium: Anzhi-Arena
- Russian Premier League: 13th
- Russian Cup: Round of 16 (vs. Krasnodar)
- Top goalscorer: League: Yannick Boli (9); All: Yannick Boli (10)
Home colours	Away colours

The 2015–16 FC Anzhi Makhachkala season was the club's first season back in the Russian Premier League, the highest tier of football in Russia, since their relegation at the end of the 2013–14 season. Anzhi will also take part in the Russian Cup, entering at the Round of 32 stage.

== Season events ==
On 18 June 2015, Yuri Semin was announced as the club's new manager, signing a one-year contract with the option of an additional year. On 29 September, Semin left Anzhi Makhachkala by Mutual consent, and Ruslan Agalarov was appointed as caretaker manager.

== Squad ==
As of 29 March 2016

Note: Flags indicate national team as defined under FIFA eligibility rules; some limited exceptions apply. Players may hold more than one non-FIFA nationality.

No.	Pos.	Nation	Player
1	GK	RUS	David Yurchenko (loan from Ufa)
3	DF	RUS	Ali Gadzhibekov
4	DF	SRB	Darko Lazić
5	DF	RUS	Aleksandr Zhirov
6	MF	ARM	Karlen Mkrtchyan
8	MF	NED	Lorenzo Ebecilio
14	MF	ALB	Bernard Berisha ^{1}
16	GK	RUS	Yury Shafinsky
18	MF	BLR	Ivan Mayewski
20	MF	NIG	Amadou Moutari
25	DF	GHA	Jonathan Mensah

No.	Pos.	Nation	Player
27	GK	RUS	Mekhti Dzhenetov
30	DF	RUS	Shamil Gasanov
37	MF	RUS	Batraz Khadartsev
55	GK	RUS	Yevgeny Pomazan
57	DF	RUS	Magomed Musalov
77	DF	RUS	Georgi Tigiyev
87	MF	RUS	Ilya Maksimov
88	MF	RUS	Anvar Gazimagomedov
94	FW	CIV	Yannick Boli
96	FW	RUS	Dzhamal Dibirgadzhiyev
99	FW	RUS	Islamnur Abdulavov

=== On loan ===
Note: Flags indicate national team as defined under FIFA eligibility rules; some limited exceptions apply. Players may hold more than one non-FIFA nationality.

No.	Pos.	Nation	Player
2	DF	RUS	Andrey Yeshchenko (at Dynamo Moscow)
—	GK	RUS	Aleksandr Krivoruchko (at Tom Tomsk)
—	DF	RUS	Yuri Udunyan (at Khimik Dzerzhinsk)

No.	Pos.	Nation	Player
—	DF	RUS	Murad Kurbanov (at Khimik Dzerzhinsk)
—	MF	MDA	Valeriu Ciupercă (at Tom Tomsk)

=== Youth squad ===
Note: Flags indicate national team as defined under FIFA eligibility rules; some limited exceptions apply. Players may hold more than one non-FIFA nationality.

No.	Pos.	Nation	Player
45	DF	RUS	Narula Dzharulayev
47	MF	RUS	Tamirlan Dzhamalutdinov
48	MF	RUS	Magomed Magomedov
49	MF	RUS	Yuri Kuzmin
53	MF	RUS	Karim Girayev
54	FW	RUS	Rashid Magomedov
56	DF	RUS	Mikhail Reshetnyak
58	DF	RUS	Magomed Elmurzayev
59	FW	RUS	Mariz Saidov
61	DF	RUS	Anton Belov
62	FW	RUS	Shakhban Gaydarov

No.	Pos.	Nation	Player
63	MF	RUS	Dordzhi Sangadzhiyev
64	MF	RUS	Tamerlan Ramazanov
65	DF	RUS	Abubakar Ustarkhanov
67	MF	RUS	Alan Yarikbayev
68	MF	RUS	Goutemir Umarov
69	FW	RUS	Said Aliyev
71	GK	RUS	Mukharbek Burayev
73	MF	RUS	Chingiz Agabalayev
75	FW	RUS	Tagir Musalov
78	MF	RUS	Timur Patakhov

== Transfers ==
=== Summer ===
In: Note: Flags indicate national team as defined under FIFA eligibility rules; some limited exceptions apply. Players may hold more than one non-FIFA nationality.

No.	Pos.	Nation	Player
2	DF	RUS	Andrey Yeshchenko (end of loan to (Russia) Kuban Krasnodar)
4	DF	SRB	Darko Lazić (from (Serbia) Red Star Belgrade)
5	DF	RUS	Aleksandr Zhirov (from (Russia) Volgar Astrakhan)
6	MF	ARM	Karlen Mkrtchyan (from (Kazakhstan) Tobol Kostanay)
8	MF	NED	Lorenzo Ebecilio (from (Ukraine) Metalurh Donetsk, previously on loan to (Russia) Mordovia Saransk)
9	FW	POR	Hugo Almeida (from (Russia) Kuban Krasnodar)
10	MF	NGR	Lukman Haruna (loan from (Ukraine) Dynamo Kyiv)
16	GK	RUS	Yury Shafinsky (from (Russia) Torpedo Moscow)
18	MF	BLR	Ivan Mayewski (from (Poland) Zawisza Bydgoszcz)
28	FW	RUS	Serder Serderov (end of loan to (Russia) Krylia Sovetov Samara)
33	GK	RUS	Sergei Pesyakov (on loan from (Russia) Spartak Moscow)
37	MF	RUS	Batraz Khadartsev (from (Russia) Tosno)
45	DF	RUS	Narula Dzharulayev (from (Russia) Anzhi-2 Makhachkala)
47	MF	RUS	Tamirlan Dzhamalutdinov (from (Russia) Anzhi-2 Makhachkala)
48	MF	RUS	Magomed Magomedov
49	MF	RUS	Yuri Kuzmin (from (Russia) Anzhi-2 Makhachkala)
53	MF	RUS	Karim Girayev (from (Russia) Anzhi-2 Makhachkala)
54	FW	RUS	Rashid Magomedov (from (Russia) Anzhi-2 Makhachkala)
55	GK	RUS	Yevgeny Pomazan (end of loan at (Russia) Kuban Krasnodar)
56	DF	RUS	Mikhail Reshetnyak (from (Russia) Dolgoprudny)
58	DF	RUS	Magomed Elmurzayev
59	FW	RUS	Mariz Saidov (from (Russia) Anzhi-2 Makhachkala)
61	FW	RUS	Anton Belov (from (Russia) Sokol Saratov academy)
62	FW	RUS	Shakhban Gaydarov
63	MF	RUS	Dordzhi Sangadzhiyev (from (Russia) Uralan Elista)
64	MF	RUS	Tamerlan Ramazanov
65	DF	RUS	Abubakar Ustarkhanov
67	MF	RUS	Alan Yarikbayev
68	MF	RUS	Goytemir Umarov
69	FW	RUS	Said Aliyev
71	GK	RUS	Mukharbek Burayev
73	MF	RUS	Chingiz Agabalayev
75	FW	RUS	Tagir Musalov (from (Russia) Anzhi-2 Makhachkala)
77	DF	RUS	Georgi Tigiyev (from (Russia) Torpedo Moscow)
78	MF	RUS	Timur Patakhov (from (Russia) Anzhi-2 Makhachkala)

Out: Note: Flags indicate national team as defined under FIFA eligibility rules; some limited exceptions apply. Players may hold more than one non-FIFA nationality.

No.	Pos.	Nation	Player
1	GK	RUS	Aleksandr Krivoruchko (loan to (Russia) Tom Tomsk)
2	DF	RUS	Aleksei Aravin (to (Russia) Tosno)
4	DF	RUS	Dmitry Aydov (to (Russia) Arsenal Tula)
8	MF	RUS	Grigori Chirkin (to (Russia) Tosno)
9	FW	RUS	Shamil Asildarov
14	MF	MDA	Valeriu Ciupercă (loan to (Russia) Tom Tomsk)
18	MF	RUS	Roman Kontsedalov (loan return to (Russia) Volga)
19	DF	RUS	Pyotr Ten (end of loan from (Russia) CSKA Moscow)
21	MF	RUS	Mikhail Komkov (to (Russia) Tosno)
22	GK	RUS	Mikhail Kerzhakov (to (Russia) Zenit St.Petersburg)
24	MF	RUS	Sergei Miroshnichenko (to (Russia) Torpedo Armavir)
28	MF	RUS	Maksim Andreyev (to (Russia) Sokol Saratov)
44	DF	RUS	Murad Kurbanov (on loan to (Russia) Khimik Dzerzhinsk)
60	MF	RUS	Magomed Muslimov
70	DF	RUS	Yuri Udunyan (on loan to (Russia) Khimik Dzerzhinsk)
80	MF	RUS	Ismail Korgoloyev
95	FW	RUS	Magomed Mitrishev (end of loan from (Russia) Terek Grozny)
—	DF	BRA	Ewerton (to (Portugal) Sporting CP, previously on loan)
—	DF	KGZ	Valery Kichin (to (Russia) Tyumen, previously on loan)

=== Winter ===
In: Note: Flags indicate national team as defined under FIFA eligibility rules; some limited exceptions apply. Players may hold more than one non-FIFA nationality.

No.	Pos.	Nation	Player
1	GK	RUS	David Yurchenko (loan from (Russia) Ufa)
14	MF	KOS	Bernard Berisha (from (Kosovo) Skënderbeu Korçë)
25	DF	GHA	Jonathan Mensah (from (France) Evian)

Out: Note: Flags indicate national team as defined under FIFA eligibility rules; some limited exceptions apply. Players may hold more than one non-FIFA nationality.

No.	Pos.	Nation	Player
2	DF	RUS	Andrey Yeshchenko (loan to (Russia) Dynamo Moscow)
7	DF	RUS	Kamil Agalarov
9	FW	POR	Hugo Almeida (to (Germany) Hannover 96)
10	MF	NGR	Lukman Haruna (loan return to (Ukraine) Dynamo Kyiv)
13	DF	RUS	Rasim Tagirbekov
15	DF	RUS	Georgi Zotov (to (Russia) Kuban Krasnodar)
28	FW	RUS	Serder Serderov (to (Bulgaria) Slavia Sofia)
33	GK	RUS	Sergei Pesyakov (loan return to (Russia) Spartak Moscow)
42	MF	BRA	Leonardo

== Friendlies ==
25 June 2015	Dynamo Moscow	1 – 0	Anzhi Makhachkala	Khimki
12:30 MSK (UTC+3)	Dyakov 55' (o.g.)	Summary	Lazić (yellow card) 26'	Stadium: Arena Khimki; Referee: Vitaly Meshkov

4 July 2015	Midtjylland (Denmark)	1 – 3	(Russia) Anzhi Makhachkala	Bad Waltersdorf, Austria
12:00 MSK (UTC+3)	Boli 28'; Maksimov 58'; Dibirgadzhiyev 69'; Ciupercă (yellow card) 83'	Summary	R.Nicolaisen 27'	Attendance: 200

7 July 2015	Maccabi Tel Aviv (Israel)	1 – 1	(Russia) Anzhi Makhachkala	Bad Waltersdorf, Austria
19:00 MSK (UTC+3)	Basat 85'	Summary	Boli 48'

10 July 2015	Copenhagen (Denmark)	2 – 0	(Russia) Anzhi Makhachkala	Bad Waltersdorf, Austria
19:00 MSK (UTC+3)	Jørgensen (yellow card) 69'; Gadzhibekov 83' (o.g.); Delaney 86'	[ Summary]

14 July 2015	Slavija Sarajevo (Bosnia and Herzegovina)	0 – 3	(Russia) Anzhi Makhachkala	Bad Waltersdorf, Austria
12:00 MSK (UTC+3)		Summary	Musalov 45'; Serderov 59'; Dibirgadzhiyev 74'	Referee: Hofler Martin

16 January 2016	Okzhetpes (Kazakhstan)	0 – 3	(Russia) Anzhi Makhachkala	Abu Dhabi, United Arab Emirates
MSK (UTC+3)		Summary	Moutari 31'; Abdulavov 34', 45'; Berisha (yellow card) 38'; Dibirgadzhiyev (yellow card) 83'

20 January 2016	Bunyodkor (Uzbekistan)	3 – 2	(Russia) Anzhi Makhachkala	Abu Dhabi, United Arab Emirates
15:00 MSK (UTC+3)	S.Kodirkulov 7'; S.Nurmatov 36'; Juraev (yellow card) 59'; Urinboev 90'	Summary	Abdulavov 23'; Berisha (yellow card) 32'; Moutari (yellow card) 42'; Boli 68'; Lazić (yellow card) 68'

26 January 2016	Henan Jianye (China)	0 – 2	(Russia) Anzhi Makhachkala	Abu Dhabi, United Arab Emirates
15:00 MSK (UTC+3)		Summary	Zhirov (yellow card) 13' (goal) 32'; Lazić 65'

3 February 2016	Jiangsu Suning (China)	2 – 0	(Russia) Anzhi Makhachkala	Marbella, Spain
18:30 MSK (UTC+3)	Ramires 36'; Yun 45'	Summary	A.Belov (yellow card) 67'

6 February 2016	Dynamo Moscow (Russia)	2 – 0	(Russia) Anzhi Makhachkala	Marbella, Spain
19:00 MSK (UTC+3)	Drahun 36'; Lyovin (yellow card) 55' (goal) 85'	Summary	Pomazan (yellow card) 20'

9 February 2016	Benfica (Angola)	0 – 1	(Russia) Anzhi Makhachkala	Marbella, Spain
18:00 MSK (UTC+3)		Summary	Mayewski 90'

12 February 2016	Krasnodar (Russia)	4 – 1	(Russia) Anzhi Makhachkala	Marbella, Spain
18:00 MSK (UTC+3)	Ari 25'; Smolov 37', 74'; Torbinski 89'	Summary	Zhirov 90'

21 February 2016	CSKA Moscow (Russia)	3 – 0	(Russia) Anzhi Makhachkala	Marbella, Spain
14:00 MSK (UTC+3)	Tošić 16'; Golovin 38'; Strandberg 85'	Summary

24 February 2016	Vålerenga (Norway)	1 – 2	(Russia) Anzhi Makhachkala	Marbella, Spain
18:00 MSK (UTC+3)	Brown 75'; Castro (yellow card) 90'	Summary	Boli 42', 69'; Agalarov (yellow card) 84' (yellow-red card) 90'

27 February 2016	Viking (Norway)	0–1	(Russia) Anzhi Makhachkala	Marbella, Spain
MSK (UTC+3)		[ Summary]

== Competitions ==
=== Russian Premier League ===
==== Results by round ====
Round	1	2	3	4	5	6	7	8	9	10	11	12	13	14	15	16	17	18	19	20	21	22	23	24	25	26	27	28	29	30
Ground	H	H	A	H	A	H	A	H	H	H	A	H	A	H	A	A	H	A	H	A	H	A	H	A	H	A	H	A	H	A
Result	L	L	L	L	D	D	W	L	L	D	D	D	L	L	L	W	D	W	L	L	L	L	D	L	W	L	L	W	W	D
Position	13	15	16	15	16	16	13	14	15	15	15	14	15	16	16	16	16	14	14	15	16	16	15	16	15	16	16	16	13	13

Updated to match(es) played on 21 May 2016. Source: Russian Premier League
A = Away; H = Home; W = Win; D = Draw; L = Loss

==== Matches ====
19 July 2015 1	Anzhi Makhachkala	0 – 1	Krylia Sovetov	Kaspiysk
21:00 MSK (UTC+3)	Haruna (yellow card) 86'	Summary	Gabulov 51'; Pomerko (yellow card) 90+1'	Stadium: Anzhi Arena; Attendance: 15,200; Referee: Alexey Nikolaev

27 July 2015 2	Anzhi Makhachkala	1 – 3	Lokomotiv Moscow	Kaspiysk
20:00 MSK (UTC+3)	Haruna 15'; Maksimov (yellow card) 47'	Summary	Škuletić 19'; Maicon 77'; Kasaev 82'; AL.Miranchuk (yellow card) 86'	Stadium: Anzhi Arena; Attendance: 18,100

1 August 2015 3	CSKA Moscow	1 – 0	Anzhi Makhachkala	Khimki
19:30 MSK (UTC+3)	Fernandes 3'; Nababkin (yellow card) 52'; Wernbloom (yellow card) 57'	Summary		Stadium: Arena Khimki; Attendance: 7,000; Referee: Vladimir Moskalyov

8 August 2015 4	Anzhi Makhachkala	2 – 3	Dynamo Moscow	Kaspiysk
20:00 MSK (UTC+3)	Maksimov 5' (yellow card) 56'; Boli 35' (pen.); Zhirov (yellow card) 37'; Moutari (yellow card) 43'; Ebecilio (yellow card) 44'; Gadzhibekov (yellow card) 45' (red card) 76'; Yeshchenko (yellow card) 90+2'	Summary	Kozlov 19'; Morozov (yellow card) 25'; Hubočan 45+1'; Valbuena 79' (pen.)	Stadium: Anzhi Arena; Attendance: 15,000; Referee: Vladislav Bezborodov

14 August 2015 5	Amkar Perm	1 – 1	Anzhi Makhachkala	Perm
17:00 MSK (UTC+3)	Zanev (yellow card) 23'; Ogude (yellow card) 26'; Gol 66'; Belorukov (yellow card) 75'; Balanovich (yellow card) 86'; Peev (yellow card) 90+4'	Summary	Yeshchenko (yellow card) 15'; Boli 64'; Maksimov (yellow card) 90+4'	Stadium: Zvezda Stadium; Attendance: 8,400; Referee: Igor Fedotov

22 August 2015 6	Anzhi Makhachkala	1 – 1	Ural	Kaspiysk
20:30 MSK (UTC+3)	Leonardo 68' (pen.)	Summary	Podberyozkin (yellow card) 9'; Yerokhin 45'; Yemelyanov (yellow card) 63'; Sapeta (red card) 67'	Stadium: Anzhi Arena; Attendance: 12,000; Referee: Aleksei Matyunin

29 August 2015 7	Spartak Moscow	1 – 2	Anzhi Makhachkala	Moscow
19:30 MSK (UTC+3)	Popov (yellow card) 29'; Kombarov 53' (pen.)	Summary	Almeida (yellow card) 16'; Ebecilio 27' (yellow card) 28'; Mkrtchyan (yellow card) 68'; Zhirov (yellow card) 71' (goal) 85'; Pesyakov (yellow card) 90+3'	Stadium: Otkrytiye Arena; Attendance: 26,167; Referee: Mikhail Vilkov

13 September 2015 8	Anzhi Makhachkala	0 – 2	Terek Grozny	Kaspiysk
19:00 MSK (UTC+3)	Lazić (yellow card) 15'; Haruna (yellow card) 20'	Summary	Lazić 59' (o.g.); Lebedenko 62'; Gorodov (yellow card) 70'	Stadium: Anzhi Arena; Attendance: 15,050; Referee: Igor Fedotov

18 September 2015 9	Rostov	1 – 0	Anzhi Makhachkala	Rostov-on-Don
19:00 MSK (UTC+3)	Margasov (yellow card) 1'; Mogilevets 7'; Navas (yellow card) 75'; Bayramyan (yellow card) 75'; Kalachev (yellow card) 83'; Rotenberg (yellow card) 90'	Summary		Stadium: Olimp-2; Attendance: 13,257; Referee: Vitaly Meshkov

26 September 2015 10	Anzhi Makhachkala	1 – 1	Ufa	Kaspiysk
16:30 MSK (UTC+3)	Tagirbekov (yellow card) 46'; Ebecilio (yellow card) 81'; Almeida 84'	Summary	Yeshchenko 70' (o.g.); Fomin (yellow card) 88'; Galiulin (yellow card) 90'; Narubin (yellow card) 90+4'	Stadium: Anzhi Arena; Attendance: 8,201; Referee: Kirill Levnikov

3 October 2015 11	Kuban Krasnodar	1 – 1	Anzhi Makhachkala	Krasnodar
19:30 MSK (UTC+3)	Melgarejo 22'; Baldé (yellow card) 83'	Summary	Mkrtchyan (yellow card) 34'; Haruna (yellow card) 38'; Tagirbekov (yellow card) 52'; Boli 59' (yellow card) 68'	Stadium: Kuban Stadium; Attendance: 7,145; Referee: Aleksei Matyunin

18 October 2015 12	Anzhi Makhachkala	2 – 2	Krasnodar	Kaspiysk
18:30 MSK (UTC+3)	Almeida 15'; Boli 40' (yellow card) 65'; Gasanov (yellow card) 42'; Leonardo (yellow card) 81'; Haruna (yellow card) 86'	Summary	Petrov (yellow card) 33'; Laborde (yellow card) 61' (goal) 79'; Strandberg (yellow card) 65'; Torbinski (yellow card) 74'; Ari 80' (yellow card) 90+3'	Stadium: Anzhi Arena; Attendance: 7,100; Referee: Aleksandr Egorov

24 October 2015 13	Zenit St.Petersburg	5 – 1	Anzhi Makhachkala	Saint Petersburg
17:00 MSK (UTC+3)	Dzyuba 7', 67'; Criscito (yellow card) 16'; Yusupov (yellow card) 43'; Witsel 55'; Shatov 73'; Hulk 85'	Summary	Maksimov 48'; Haruna (yellow card) 67'	Stadium: Petrovsky Stadium; Attendance: 16,970; Referee: Vladimir Moskalyov

1 November 2015 14	Anzhi Makhachkala	1 – 2	Rubin Kazan	Kaspiysk
16:30 MSK (UTC+3)	Maksimov 65'; Ebecilio (yellow card) 66'	Summary	Dević 20', 22'	Stadium: Anzhi Arena; Attendance: 4,530; Referee: Alexey Nikolaev

6 November 2015 15	Mordovia Saransk	4 – 0	Anzhi Makhachkala	Saransk
19:00 MSK (UTC+3)	Vlasov 3'; Lutsenko 18', 54'; Stevanović (yellow card) 45+1'; Mukhametshin (yellow card) 60'; Djaló 69'; Dudiyev (yellow card) 71'	Summary	Zotov (yellow card) 24'; Moutari (yellow card) 29'; Khadartsev (yellow card) 73'	Stadium: Start Stadium; Attendance: 4,317; Referee: Aleksey Eskov

21 November 2015 16	Lokomotiv Moscow	0 – 2	Anzhi Makhachkala	Moscow
19:00 MSK (UTC+3)	Ďurica (yellow card) 39'	Summary	Abdulavov (yellow card) 15' (goal) 55'; Gadzhibekov (yellow card) 24'; Agalarov (yellow card) 34'; Boli 70'	Stadium: Lokomotiv Stadium; Attendance: 5,348; Referee: Vitaly Meshkov

29 November 2015 17	Anzhi Makhachkala	1 – 1	CSKA Moscow	Kaspiysk
15:00 MSK (UTC+3)	Tagirbekov (yellow card) 35'; Maksimov 55'; Tigiyev (yellow card) 82'	Summary	Nababkin 10'; Vasin (yellow card) 24'; Wernbloom (yellow card) 44'; Cauņa (yellow card) 78'; Panchenko (yellow card) 86'	Stadium: Anzhi Arena; Attendance: 8,100; Referee: Sergey Lapochkin

4 December 2015 18	Dynamo Moscow	1 – 2	Anzhi Makhachkala	Khimki
19:00 MSK (UTC+3)	Kozlov 18'; Sosnin (yellow card) 33' (yellow-red card) 84'; Dyakov (yellow card) 41'; Obolsky (yellow card) 90+3'	Summary	Agalarov (yellow card) 33'; Ebecilio 53'; Maksimov 54'; Gadzhibekov (yellow card) 64'; Pomazan (yellow card) 90+4'	Stadium: Arena Khimki; Attendance: 3,327; Referee: Mikhail Vilkov

7 March 2016 19	Anzhi Makhachkala	0 – 1	Amkar Perm	Kaspiysk
17:00 MSK (UTC+3)	Boli (yellow card) 30'	Summary	Peev 3'; Balanovich (yellow card) 64'	Stadium: Anzhi Arena; Attendance: 8,100; Referee: Aleksei Matyunin

12 March 2016 20	Ural	4 – 2	Anzhi Makhachkala	Yekaterinburg
14:30 MSK (UTC+3)	Gogniyev 10', 84', 90+1'; Sapeta 19'	Summary	Berisha 29'; Ebecilio (yellow card) 39'; Maksimov (yellow card) 61' (goal) 70'; Zhirov (yellow card) 82'	Stadium: SKB-Bank Arena; Attendance: 4,200; Referee: Igor Fedotov

18 March 2016 21	Anzhi Makhachkala	0 – 4	Spartak Moscow	Kaspiysk
19:30 MSK (UTC+3)		Summary	Zé Luís 4', 85'; Glushakov 31'; Promes 67'	Stadium: Anzhi Arena; Attendance: 8,950; Referee: Kirill Levnikov

2 April 2016 22	Terek Grozny	3 – 2	Anzhi Makhachkala	Grozny
14:30 MSK (UTC+3)	Grozav 11', 26' (yellow card) 57'; Mitrishev (yellow card) 31'; Ivanov (yellow card) 77'; Mbengue 87'	Summary	Lazić (yellow card) 1' (goal) 7'; Boli 44'; Berisha (yellow card) 77'; Musalov (yellow card) 90+3'	Stadium: Akhmat-Arena; Attendance: 19,732; Referee: Aleksey Eskov

8 April 2016 23	Anzhi Makhachkala	0 – 0	Rostov	Kaspiysk
19:00 MSK (UTC+3)	Boli (yellow card) 90+1'	Summary	Kudryashov (yellow card) 67'	Stadium: Anzhi Arena; Attendance: 6,200; Referee: Alexey Nikolaev

17 April 2016 24	Ufa	2 – 0	Anzhi Makhachkala	Ufa
14:30 MSK (UTC+3)	Tumasyan 3'; Katsalapov (yellow card) 81'; Zubarev 90+3'	Summary		Stadium: Dynamo Stadium; Attendance: 8,350; Referee: Sergei Ivanov

24 April 2016 25	Anzhi Makhachkala	1 – 0	Kuban Krasnodar	Kaspiysk
19:30 MSK (UTC+3)	Boli 80' (pen.); Berisha (yellow card) 88'	Summary	Santana (yellow card) 26'; Belenov (red card) 77'; Zotov (yellow card) 84'	Stadium: Anzhi Arena; Attendance: 4,500; Referee: Kirill Levnikov

1 May 2015 26	Krasnodar	3 – 0	Anzhi Makhachkala	Krasnodar
19:30 MSK (UTC+3)	Granqvist (yellow card) 50'; Smolov 51', 72'; Mamayev 81'	Summary	Moutari (yellow card) 15'; Berisha (yellow card) 90+1'	Stadium: Kuban Stadium; Attendance: 7,575; Referee: Aleksey Eskov

7 May 2016 27	Anzhi Makhachkala	0 – 1	Zenit St.Petersburg	Kaspiysk
17:00 MSK (UTC+3)	Berisha (yellow card) 9' (yellow-red card) 90'; Gadzhibekov (yellow card) 18'; Maksimov (yellow card) 45'; Mkrtchyan (yellow card) 90+4'; Mayewski (yellow card) 90+4'	Summary	Dzyuba 26'; Neto (yellow card) 36'; Yusupov (yellow card) 45+1'; Smolnikov (yellow card) 50'; Criscito (yellow card) 67'; Zhirkov (yellow card) 76'	Stadium: Anzhi Arena; Attendance: 8,500; Referee: Mikhail Vilkov

11 May 2016 28	Rubin Kazan	1 – 2	Anzhi Makhachkala	Kazan
19:00 MSK (UTC+3)	Portnyagin 17'; Kuzmin (yellow card) 48' (yellow-red card) 89'; Bergström (yellow card) 52'; Kislyak (yellow card) 54'	Summary	Boli 33'; Lazić 58'; Mayewski (yellow card) 65'	Stadium: Kazan Arena; Attendance: 7,838; Referee: Vladislav Bezborodov

15 May 2016 29	Anzhi Makhachkala	3 – 0	Mordovia Saransk	Kaspiysk
17:00 MSK (UTC+3)	Boli 39'; Moutari (yellow card) 42'; Mkrtchyan 57'; Musalov 90+1'	Summary	Nakhushev (yellow card) 64'	Stadium: Anzhi Arena; Attendance: 10,124; Referee: Aleksei Matyunin

21 May 2016 30	Krylia Sovetov	0 – 0	Anzhi Makhachkala	Samara
13:30 MSK (UTC+3)	Yatchenko (yellow card) 25'; Tsallagov (yellow card) 85'	Summary	Mayewski (yellow card) 69'; Abdulavov (yellow card) 85'	Stadium: Metallurg Stadium; Attendance: 7,693; Referee: Sergey Karasev

==== League table ====
Pos	Team	Pld	W	D	L	GF	GA	GD	Pts	Qualification or relegation
11	Amkar Perm	30	7	10	13	22	33	−11	31	
12	Ufa	30	6	9	15	25	44	−19	27	
13	Anzhi Makhachkala (O)	30	6	8	16	28	50	−22	26	Qualification for the Relegation play-offs
14	Kuban Krasnodar (R)	30	5	11	14	34	44	−10	26	Qualification for the Relegation play-offs
15	Dynamo Moscow (R)	30	5	10	15	25	47	−22	25	Relegation to Football National League

Source: Russian Premier League, Soccerway
Rules for classification: 1) Points; 2) Matches won; 3) Head-to-head points; 4) Head-to-head matches won; 5) Head-to-head goal difference; 6) Head-to-head goals scored; 7) Head-to-head away goals; 8) Goal difference; 9) Goals scored; 10) Away goals scored.
(O) Play-off winners; (R) Relegated

==== Relegation play-offs ====
24 May 2016 1st Leg	Volgar Astrakhan	0 – 1	Anzhi Makhachkala	Astrakhan
18:00 MSK (UTC+3)	Aleynik (yellow card) 64'; Yakovlev (yellow card) 90'	Summary	Lazić (yellow card) 71'; Moutari (yellow card) 74'; Boli 90+2'	Stadium: Central Stadium; Attendance: 10,500; Referee: Kirill Levnikov

27 May 2016 2nd Leg	Anzhi Makhachkala	2 – 0 (3 – 0 agg.)	Volgar Astrakhan	Kaspiysk
19:00 MSK (UTC+3)	Lazić 7'; Boli 34'; Gasanov (yellow card) 50'	Summary	Bairyyev (yellow card) 65'; Zuykov (yellow card) 72'; Gazzayev (yellow card) 87'	Stadium: Anzhi Arena; Attendance: 21,500; Referee: Sergey Lapochkin

=== Russian Cup ===
22 September 2015 Round of 32	Sokol Saratov	2 – 4	Anzhi Makhachkala	Saratov
19:00 MSK (UTC+3)	Stolyarenko 17' (yellow card) 64'; Molodtsov (yellow card) 42'; Korotayev 88'	Summary	Lazić (yellow card) 16'; Boli 36'; Leonardo 61'; Almeida 75', 90+1'; Mkrtchyan (yellow card) 88'	Stadium: Lokomotiv Stadium; Attendance: 9,250; Referee: Evgeny Turbin

29 October 2015 Round of 16	Krasnodar	3 – 1	Anzhi Makhachkala	Kuban Stadium
19:00 MSK (UTC+3)	Mamayev 20' (pen.); Tagirbekov 25'; Bystrov (yellow card) 42'; Markov (yellow card) 52'; Joãozinho 90+1'	Summary	Tigiyev (yellow card) 24'; Zhirov (yellow card) 45'; Yeshchenko 71'; Khadartsev (yellow card) 80'; Agalarov (yellow card) 90'; Ebecilio (yellow card) 90'	Stadium: Krasnodar; Attendance: 4,045; Referee: Aleksei Matyunin

== Squad statistics ==
As of Match played 27 May 2016

=== Appearances and goals ===
No.	Pos	Nat	Player	Total		Premier League		Russian Cup		Play Off	
No.	Pos	Nat	Player	Apps	Goals	Apps	Goals	Apps	Goals	Apps	Goals
1	GK	(Russia) RUS	David Yurchenko	11	0	9	0	0	0	2	0
3	DF	(Russia) RUS	Ali Gadzhibekov	22	0	20	0	1	0	0+1	0
4	DF	(Serbia) SRB	Darko Lazić	28	3	21+4	2	1	0	2	1
5	DF	(Russia) RUS	Aleksandr Zhirov	34	1	30	1	2	0	2	0
6	MF	(Armenia) ARM	Karlen Mkrtchyan	21	1	15+5	1	0+1	0	0	0
8	MF	(Netherlands) NED	Lorenzo Ebecilio	28	2	19+5	2	2	0	2	0
14	MF	(Albania) ALB	Bernard Berisha	13	1	8+3	1	0	0	0+2	0
18	MF	(Belarus) BLR	Ivan Mayewski	20	0	17+1	0	0	0	2	0
20	MF	(Niger) NIG	Amadou Moutari	20	0	13+4	0	0+1	0	2	0
25	DF	(Ghana) GHA	Jonathan Mensah	8	0	6	0	0	0	2	0
30	DF	(Russia) RUS	Shamil Gasanov	13	0	5+5	0	1	0	2	0
37	MF	(Russia) RUS	Batraz Khadartsev	17	0	10+5	0	1+1	0	0	0
47	MF	(Russia) RUS	Tamirlan Dzhamalutdinov	1	0	0	0	0	0	0+1	0
55	GK	(Russia) RUS	Yevgeny Pomazan	10	0	9	0	1	0	0	0
57	DF	(Russia) RUS	Magomed Musalov	11	1	9	1	0	0	2	0
77	DF	(Russia) RUS	Georgi Tigiyev	22	0	16+3	0	1	0	2	0
87	MF	(Russia) RUS	Ilya Maksimov	23	6	22	6	1	0	0	0
88	MF	(Russia) RUS	Anvar Gazimagomedov	5	0	3+2	0	0	0	0	0
94	FW	(Ivory Coast) CIV	Yannick Boli	32	12	21+7	9	2	1	2	2
99	FW	(Russia) RUS	Islamnur Abdulavov	21	1	8+11	1	0	0	0+2	0
Players away from the club on loan:
1	GK	(Russia) RUS	Aleksandr Krivoruchko	1	0	0+1	0	0	0	0	0
2	DF	(Russia) RUS	Andrey Yeshchenko	17	1	15+1	0	1	1	0	0
Players who appeared for Anzhi Makhachkala no longer at the club:
7	DF	(Russia) RUS	Kamil Agalarov	12	0	8+2	0	2	0	0	0
9	FW	(Portugal) POR	Hugo Almeida	14	4	7+5	2	0+2	2	0	0
10	MF	(Nigeria) NGR	Lukman Haruna	13	1	10+2	1	1	0	0	0
13	DF	(Russia) RUS	Rasim Tagirbekov	10	0	9	0	1	0	0	0
15	DF	(Russia) RUS	Georgi Zotov	5	0	2+2	0	1	0	0	0
28	FW	(Russia) RUS	Serder Serderov	2	0	0+1	0	1	0	0	0
33	GK	(Russia) RUS	Sergei Pesyakov	12	0	11	0	1	0	0	0
42	MF	(Brazil) BRA	Leonardo	11	2	7+3	1	1	1	0	0

=== Goal scorers ===
Place	Position	Nation	Number	Name	Russian Premier League	Russian Cup	Play Off	Total
1	FW	(Ivory Coast)	94	Yannick Boli	9	1	2	12
2	MF	(Russia)	87	Ilya Maksimov	6	0	0	6
3	FW	(Portugal)	9	Hugo Almeida	2	2	0	4
4	DF	(Serbia)	4	Darko Lazić	2	0	1	3
5	MF	(Netherlands)	8	Lorenzo Ebecilio	2	0	0	2
5	MF	(Brazil)	42	Leonardo	1	1	0	2
7	MF	(Nigeria)	10	Lukman Haruna	1	0	0	1
7	DF	(Russia)	5	Aleksandr Zhirov	1	0	0	1
7	FW	(Russia)	99	Islamnur Abdulavov	1	0	0	1
7	MF	(Albania)	14	Bernard Berisha	1	0	0	1
7	MF	(Armenia)	6	Karlen Mkrtchyan	1	0	0	1
7	DF	(Russia)	57	Magomed Musalov	1	0	0	1
7	DF	(Russia)	2	Andrey Yeshchenko	0	1	0	1
				TOTALS	28	5	3	36

=== Disciplinary record ===
Number	Nation	Position	Name	Russian Premier League		Russian Cup		Play Off		Total	
Number	Nation	Position	Name	Yellow card	Red card	Yellow card	Red card	Yellow card	Red card	Yellow card	Red card
2	(Russia)	DF	Andrey Yeshchenko	2	0	0	0	0	0	2	0
3	(Russia)	DF	Ali Gadzhibekov	4	1	0	0	0	0	4	1
4	(Serbia)	DF	Darko Lazić	2	0	1	0	1	0	4	0
5	(Russia)	DF	Aleksandr Zhirov	3	0	1	0	0	0	4	0
6	(Armenia)	MF	Karlen Mkrtchyan	3	0	1	0	0	0	4	0
7	(Russia)	DF	Kamil Agalarov	2	0	1	0	0	0	3	0
8	(Netherlands)	MF	Lorenzo Ebecilio	4	0	1	0	0	0	5	0
9	(Portugal)	FW	Hugo Almeida	1	0	0	0	0	0	1	0
10	(Nigeria)	MF	Lukman Haruna	4	0	0	0	0	0	4	0
13	(Russia)	DF	Rasim Tagirbekov	3	0	0	0	0	0	3	0
14	(Albania)	MF	Bernard Berisha	5	1	0	0	0	0	5	1
15	(Russia)	MF	Georgi Zotov	1	0	0	0	0	0	1	0
18	(Belarus)	MF	Ivan Mayewski	3	0	0	0	0	0	3	0
20	(Niger)	MF	Amadou Moutari	4	0	0	0	1	0	5	0
30	(Russia)	DF	Shamil Gasanov	1	0	0	0	1	0	2	0
33	(Russia)	GK	Sergei Pesyakov	1	0	0	0	0	0	1	0
37	(Russia)	MF	Batraz Khadartsev	1	0	1	0	0	0	2	0
42	(Brazil)	MF	Leonardo	1	0	0	0	0	0	1	0
55	(Russia)	GK	Yevgeny Pomazan	1	0	0	0	0	0	1	0
57	(Russia)	DF	Magomed Musalov	1	0	0	0	0	0	1	0
77	(Russia)	DF	Georgi Tigiyev	1	0	1	0	0	0	2	0
87	(Russia)	MF	Ilya Maksimov	5	0	0	0	0	0	5	0
94	(Ivory Coast)	FW	Yannick Boli	5	0	0	0	0	0	5	0
99	(Russia)	FW	Islamnur Abdulavov	2	0	0	0	0	0	2	0
			TOTALS	61	2	7	0	3	0	71	2

== Notes ==
- As Russia does not recognize Kosovo as an independent state, Berisha is registered with the Russian league as an Albanian citizen.
