= Vladimir Kurayev =

Russian footballer

Personal information
- Full name: Vladimir Petrovich Kurayev
- Date of birth: 10 June 1969 (age 57)
- Place of birth: Gorky, Russian SFSR
- Height: 1.90 m (6 ft 3 in)
- Position: Defender

Youth career
- DYuSSh-8 Gorky

Senior career*
Years	Team	Apps	(Gls)
1986	FC Spartak Ordzhonikidze	40	(3)
1987	FC Lokomotiv Gorky	9	(0)
1990	FC Znamya Arzamas	32	(7)
1991–1993	FC Lokomotiv Nizhny Novgorod	95	(13)
1994	FC Torpedo Arzamas	16	(3)
1995	FC Tekstilshchik Kamyshin	20	(1)
1996–1997	FC Lokomotiv Nizhny Novgorod	53	(3)
1998	FC Kuban Krasnodar	19	(0)
1999–2002	FC Saturn Ramenskoye	92	(0)
2003–2004	FC Lisma-Mordovia Saransk	64	(0)
2005	FC Lokomotiv-NN Nizhny Novgorod	3	(0)
2006	FC Telma-Vodnik Nizhny Novgorod		
2007	FC Nizhny Novgorod-Volga-d		
2008	FC Nizhny Novgorod	2	(0)
- * Club domestic league appearances and goals

Vladimir Petrovich Kurayev (Russian: Владимир Петрович Кураев; born 10 June 1969) is a former Russian professional footballer.

== Club career ==
He made his professional debut in the Soviet First League in 1986 for FC Spartak Ordzhonikidze. He played 3 games in the UEFA Intertoto Cup 1997 for FC Lokomotiv Nizhny Novgorod.

== Personal life ==
His son Dmitri Kurayev is also a footballer.

== Honours ==
- Top 33 year-end best players list: 2001.
