= Georgi Tigiyev =

Russian footballer (born 1995)

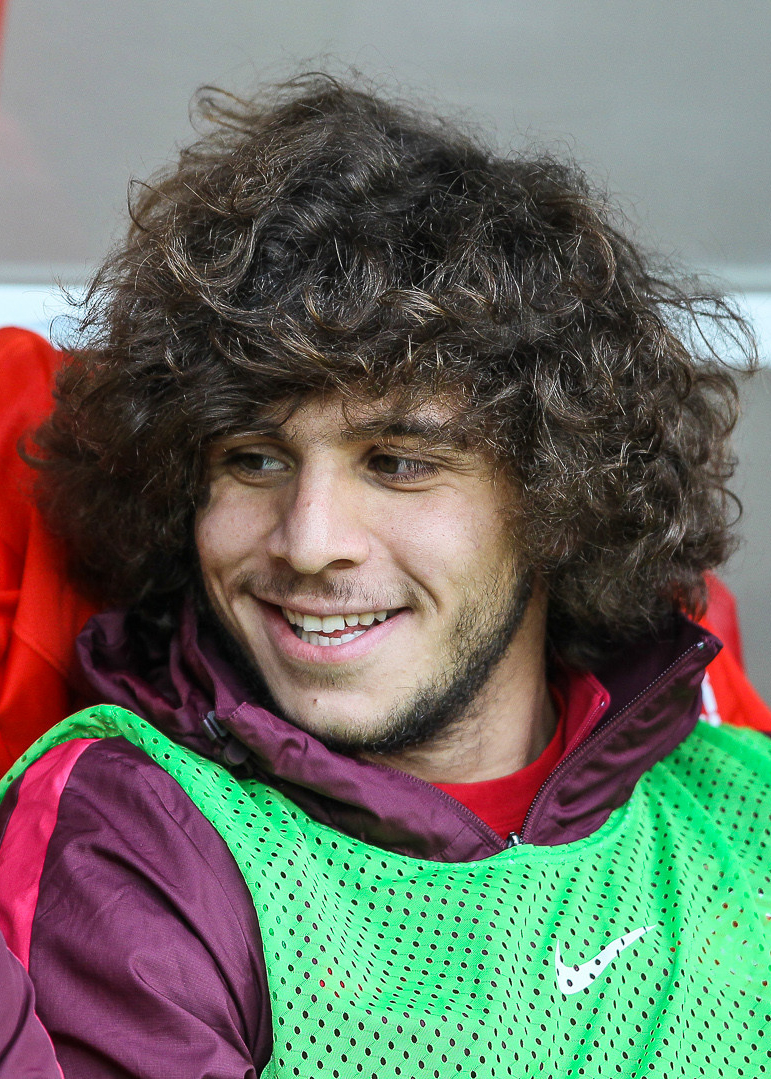
- Tigiyev with Spartak Moscow in 2017

Personal information
- Full name: Georgi Lvovich Tigiyev
- Date of birth: 26 May 1995 (age 31)
- Place of birth: Vladikavkaz, Russia
- Height: 1.77 m (5 ft 10 in)
- Position: Left back

Youth career
- –2010: Yunost Vladikavkaz
- 2011–2012: Dynamo Kostroma (D4)
- 2013: FC Kolomyagi-47 Saint Petersburg
- 2013–2014: Kuban Krasnodar

Senior career*
Years	Team	Apps	(Gls)
2014–2015	Torpedo Moscow	5	(0)
2015–2017	Anzhi Makhachkala	35	(0)
2017	→ Spartak Moscow (loan)	4	(0)
2017–2021	Spartak Moscow	3	(0)
2017–2018	→ Spartak-2 Moscow	2	(0)
2018–2019	→ Krylia Sovetov Samara (loan)	2	(0)
2019	→ Dinamo Minsk (loan)	12	(0)
2020–2021	→ Spartak-2 Moscow	4	(0)

International career
2015	Russia U21	2	(0)
- * Club domestic league appearances and goals

Georgi Lvovich Tigiyev (Russian: Георгий Львович Тигиев; born 26 May 1995) is a Russian former professional footballer who played as a left-back.

== Club career ==
Tigiyev made his professional debut on 3 May 2015 for FC Torpedo Moscow in a Russian Football Premier League game against FC Rubin Kazan. In July 2015, he signed for FC Anzhi Makhachkala. He made his league debut for the club on 1 August 2015 in a 1-0 away loss to CSKA Moscow. He was subbed on for Georgi Zotov at halftime. On 24 February 2017, he signed a loan contract with FC Spartak Moscow that ran until 31 May 2017. He made his league debut for the club on 3 April 2017 in a 3–2 home victory over FC Orenburg. He was subbed off in the 56th minute, being replaced by Andrey Yeshchenko. On 13 June 2017, he signed a full long-term contract with Spartak.

On 31 August 2018, he joined PFC Krylia Sovetov Samara on loan for the 2018–19 season. On 28 February 2019, Krylia Sovetov announced he would move on another loan to Belarus at Dinamo Minsk until the summer.

== Career statistics ==
As of 13 May 2018

Club	Season	League			Cup		Continental		Other		Total	
Club	Season	Division	Apps	Goals	Apps	Goals	Apps	Goals	Apps	Goals	Apps	Goals
FC Kuban Krasnodar	2013–14	Russian Premier League	0	0	0	0	0	0	–		0	0
FC Torpedo Moscow	2014–15	Russian Premier League	5	0	0	0	–		–		5	0
FC Anzhi Makhachkala	2015–16	Russian Premier League	19	0	1	0	–		2 (Note: Two appearances in relegation play-offs)	0	22	0
FC Anzhi Makhachkala	2016–17	Russian Premier League	14	0	2	0	–		–		16	0
FC Anzhi Makhachkala	Total		33	0	3	0	0	0	2	0	38	0
FC Spartak Moscow	2016–17	Russian Premier League	4	0	–		–		–		4	0
FC Spartak Moscow	2017–18	Russian Premier League	3	0	0	0	0	0	0	0	3	0
FC Spartak Moscow	Total		7	0	0	0	0	0	0	0	7	0
FC Spartak-2 Moscow	2017–18	FNL	2	0	–		–		–		2	0
Career total			47	0	3	0	0	0	2	0	52	0

== Club Honours ==
Spartak Moscow

- Russian Premier League: 2016-17
- Russian Super Cup: 2017
