= Ismail Korgoloyev =

Russian footballer

Personal information
- Full name: Ismail Magomedovich Korgoloyev
- Date of birth: 15 March 1994 (age 32)
- Place of birth: Makhachkala, Russia.
- Height: 1.72 m (5 ft 7 1/2 in)
- Position: Midfielder

Senior career*
Years	Team	Apps	(Gls)
2012–2015	FC Anzhi Makhachkala	1	(0)
2014–2015	FC Anzhi-2 Makhachkala	29	(0)
2016	FC Legion Dynamo Makhachkala	10	(1)
2017	FC Ararat-2 Moscow		
2019–2020	FC Makhachkala	9	(0)
- * Club domestic league appearances and goals

Ismail Magomedovich Korgoloyev (Russian: Исмаил Магомедович Корголоев; born 15 March 1994) is a Russian former football player.

== Club career ==
He made his professional debut in the Russian Professional Football League for FC Anzhi-2 Makhachkala on 12 August 2014 in a game against FC Alania Vladikavkaz. He made his Russian Football National League debut for FC Anzhi Makhachkala on 30 May 2015 in a game against FC Sakhalin Yuzhno-Sakhalinsk.
