= Neumarkt an der Ybbs =

- Municipality
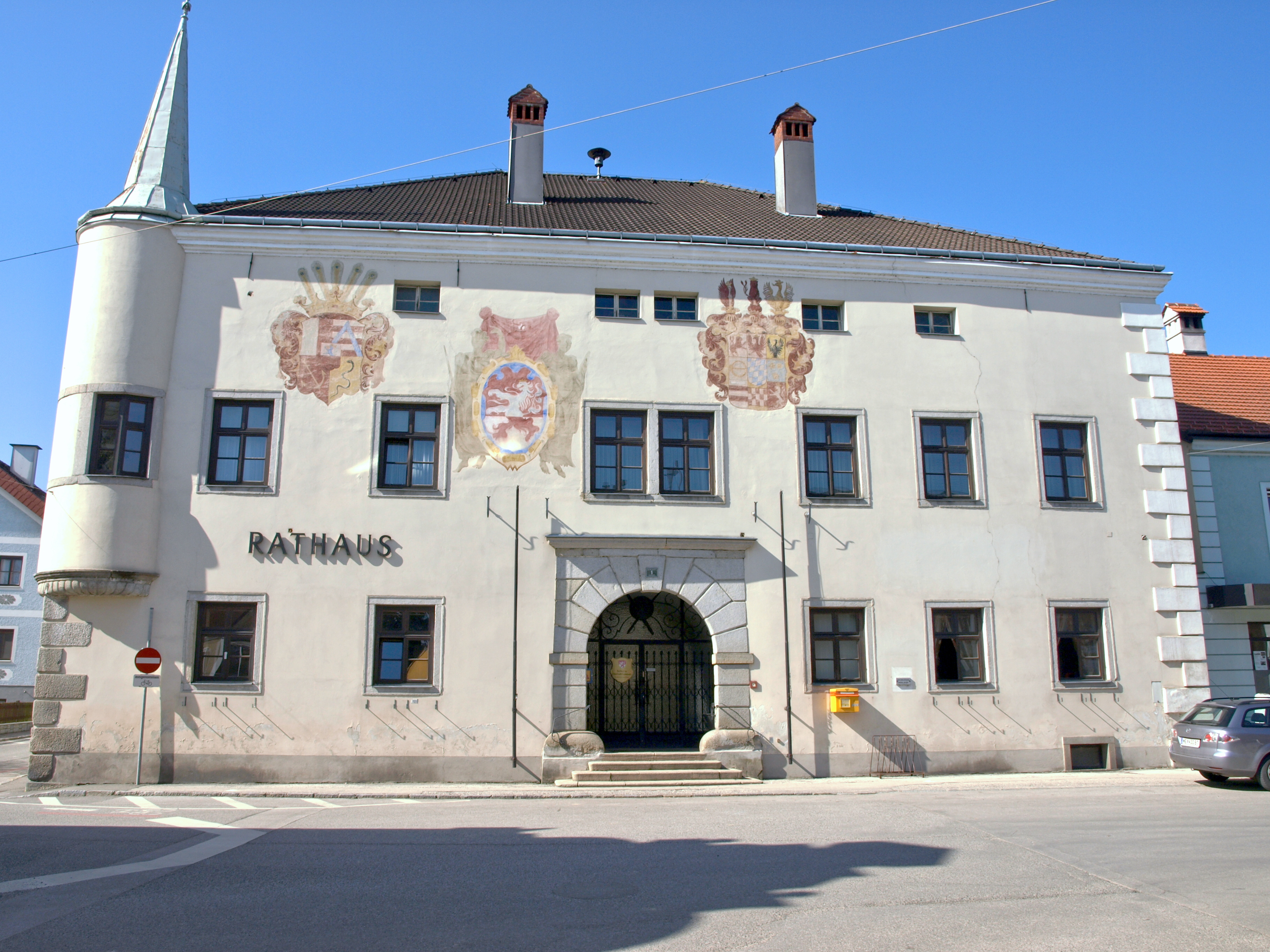
- Neumarkt an der Ybbs town hall

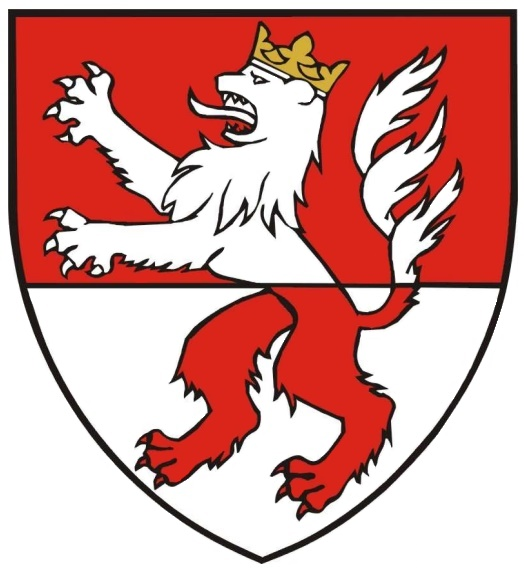
- Coat of arms

- Location within Austria
- Coordinates: 48°8′N 15°3′E
- Country: Austria
- State: Lower Austria
- District: Melk

Government
  - Mayor: Otto Jäger

Area
  - Total: 9.32 km^{2} (3.60 sq mi)
- Elevation: 231 m (758 ft)

Population (2018-01-01)
  - Total: 1,919
  - Density: 206/km^{2} (533/sq mi)
- Time zone: UTC+1 (CET)
  - Summer (DST): UTC+2 (CEST)
- Postal code: 3371
- Area code: 07412
- Website: www.neumarkt-ybbs.gv.at

Neumarkt an der Ybbs is a town in the district of Melk in the Austrian state of Lower Austria.

== Geography ==
The municipality consists of the following subdivisions:

- Neumarkt (about 1150 inhabitants)
- Kemmelbach (about 400 inhabitants)
- Waasen (120 inhabitants)
- Wolfsberg (75 inhabitants)
- Winden (35 inhabitants)
- Mauer (15 inhabitants)
