= Dmitri Kurayev =

Russian footballer

Personal information
- Full name: Dmitri Vladimirovich Kurayev
- Date of birth: 1 August 1995 (age 31)
- Place of birth: Nizhny Novgorod, Russia
- Height: 1.83 m (6 ft 0 in)
- Position: Defender

Youth career
- FC Volga Nizhny Novgorod

Senior career*
Years	Team	Apps	(Gls)
2013–2016	FC Volga Nizhny Novgorod	12	(0)
2015	→ FC Volga-Olimpiyets Nizhny Novgorod (loan)	0	(0)
2016	→ FC Khimik Dzerzhinsk (loan)	4	(0)
2016–2017	FC Volga Ulyanovsk	15	(0)
- * Club domestic league appearances and goals

Dmitri Vladimirovich Kurayev (Russian: Дмитрий Владимирович Кураев; born 1 August 1995) is a Russian former football player.

== Club career ==
He made his professional debut in the Russian Football National League for FC Volga Nizhny Novgorod on 19 July 2014 in a game against FC Anzhi Makhachkala.

== Personal life ==
His father Vladimir Kurayev also was a footballer.
