= FC Makhachkala =

Russian football club

SC Makhachkala
- Full name: АНО «Спортивный клуб „Махачкала“» (Sports Club Makhachkala)
- Founded: 2019; 6 years ago
- Dissolved: 2021; 4 years ago
- Chairman: Gadzhi Gadzhiyev
- League: Russian Professional Football League, Group 1
- 2020–21: 8th
- Website: https://fcmakhachkala.wixsite.com/main
Home colours	Away colours

SC Makhachkala (Russian: АНО «Спортивный клуб „Махачкала“») was a Russian football team from Makhachkala. It was founded in 2019 by three people (including coach Gadzhi Gadzhiyev) and licensed for third-tier Russian Professional Football League for the 2019–20 season. Before the 2021–22 season, the club was replaced by restored FC Dynamo Makhachkala.

== History ==
=== Domestic history ===
Season	League									Russian Cup	Top goalscorer		Manager
Season	Div.	Pos.	Pl.	W	D	L	GS	GA	P	Russian Cup	Name	League	Manager
2019–20	3rd	7th	19	7	5	7	19	24	26	First round	(Russia) Rustam Isayev (Russia) Anvar Gazimagomedov (Russia) Karim Girayev (Russia) Tagir Musalov	3	(Russia) Ruslan Agalarov
2020–21	3rd									Round of 1/256			(Russia) Ruslan Agalarov (Russia) Arslan Khalimbekov
