= Alli N'Dri =

Ivorian footballer (born 1984)

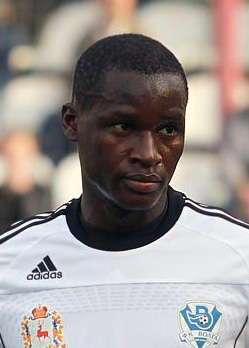

Personal information
- Full name: Vincent de Paul Kouadio Alli N'Dri
- Date of birth: 12 January 1984 (age 42)
- Place of birth: Bingerville, Ivory Coast
- Height: 1.80 m (5 ft 11 in)
- Positions: Defender; midfielder

Youth career
- –2002: Académie de Sol

Senior career*
Years	Team	Apps	(Gls)
2003–2008	ASEC Mimosas		
2009	FC Shinnik Yaroslavl	33	(0)
2010	FC Volga Nizhny Novgorod	16	(0)
2010	→ FC Shinnik Yaroslavl (loan)	12	(0)
2011–2017	FC Shinnik Yaroslavl	113	(0)
- * Club domestic league appearances and goals as of 20 May 2017

Vincent de Paul Kouadio " N'Dri (born 12 January 1984 in Bingerville) is an African footballer.

== Career ==
N'Dri began his career in the Académie de Sol Beni and was promoted to Côte d'Ivoire Premier Division champion ASEC Mimosas in January 2003, who was named as Team Captain. N'Dri was one of ASEC’s experienced first choice defenders and played almost all his club's games. He left after six years first team football and signed with Russian club, FC Shinnik Yaroslavl in January 2009.

== International ==
On 28 May 2007 was his first call up for Ivory Coast an African Cup of Nations Qualifications game against Madagascar.

== Career statistics ==
As of match played 11 July 2016

Club	Season	League			National Cup		Play-offs		Total	
Club	Season	Division	Apps	Goals	Apps	Goals	Apps	Goals	Apps	Goals
Shinnik Yaroslavl	2009	FNL	33	0	0	0	0	0	33	0
Volga Nizhny Novgorod	2010	FNL	16	0	1	0	0	0	17	0
Shinnik Yaroslavl (loan)	2010	FNL	12	0	0	0	0	0	12	0
Shinnik Yaroslavl	2011–12	FNL	22	0	0	0	1	0	23	0
Shinnik Yaroslavl	2012–13	FNL	20	0	0	0	0	0	20	0
Shinnik Yaroslavl	2013–14	FNL	14	0	1	0	0	0	15	0
Shinnik Yaroslavl	2014–15	FNL	22	0	2	0	0	0	24	0
Shinnik Yaroslavl	2015–16	FNL	24	0	1	0	0	0	25	0
Shinnik Yaroslavl	2016–17	FNL	1	0	0	0	0	0	1	0
Total		FNL	103	0	4	0	1	0	108	0
Career total			164	0	5	0	1	0	170	0

== Honours ==
=== Club ===
ASEC Mimosas

- Côte d'Ivoire Premier Division (4): 2003, 2004, 2005, 2006
- Coupe de Côte d'Ivoire de football (4): 2003, 2005, 2007, 2008
- Coupe Houphouët-Boigny (4): 2004, 2006, 2007, 2008
