= Georgi Zotov =

Russian footballer

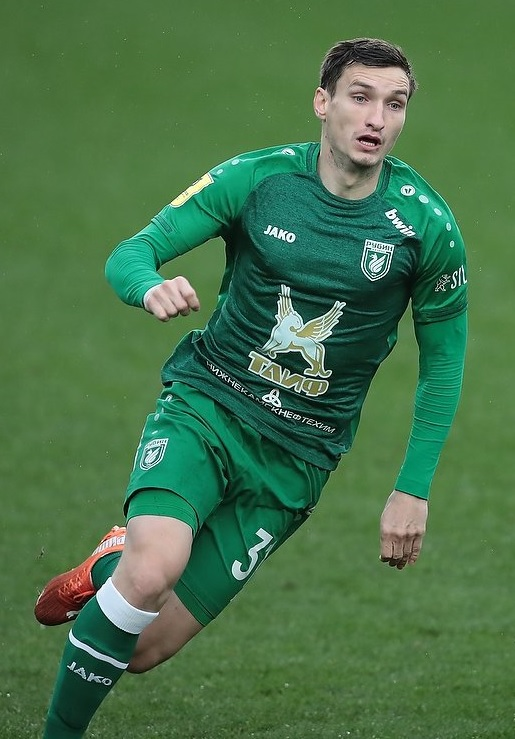
- Zotov with Rubin Kazan in 2020

Personal information
- Full name: Georgi Andreyevich Zotov
- Date of birth: 12 January 1990 (age 36)
- Place of birth: Novosibirsk, Russian SFSR
- Height: 1.75 m (5 ft 9 in)
- Position: Right back

Team information
- Current team: Sibir Novosibirsk
- Number: 31

Youth career
- Spartak Moscow

Senior career*
Years	Team	Apps	(Gls)
2009–2012	Lokomotiv-2 Moscow	106	(11)
2013	Metallurg-Kuzbass Novokuznetsk	11	(0)
2013	Salyut Belgorod	7	(0)
2013–2014	Metalurh Donetsk	18	(0)
2014–2015	Anzhi Makhachkala	28	(2)
2016	Kuban Krasnodar	35	(0)
2017–2020	Krylia Sovetov Samara	72	(4)
2019–2020	→ Orenburg (loan)	20	(1)
2020–2022	Rubin Kazan	43	(0)
2022–2024	Krylia Sovetov Samara	28	(1)
2024–2026	Orenburg	13	(0)
2026–	Sibir Novosibirsk	33	(0)
- * Club domestic league appearances and goals as of 15 November 2026

Georgi Andreyevich Zotov (Russian: Георгий Андреевич Зотов; born 12 January 1990) is a Russian professional football player who plays as a right back for Sibir Novosibirsk. He also played as a left back and left midfielder.

== Club career ==
On 26 July 2019, he joined FC Orenburg on loan.

On 17 August 2020, he signed a contract with Rubin Kazan for the 2020–21 season.

On 24 August 2022, Zotov returned to Krylia Sovetov Samara. He signed a contract until the end of the 2022–23 season.

On 8 July 2024, Zotov returned to Orenburg. On 8 January 2026, his contract with Orenburg was terminated by mutual consent.

== Career statistics ==
As of match played 26 November 2025

Appearances and goals by club, season and competition
Club	Season	League			Cup		Europe		Other		Total	
Club	Season	Division	Apps	Goals	Apps	Goals	Apps	Goals	Apps	Goals	Apps	Goals
Lokomotiv-2 Moscow	2009	Russian Second League	28	2	1	0	—		—		29	2
Lokomotiv-2 Moscow	2010	Russian Second League	28	1	2	1	—		—		30	2
Lokomotiv-2 Moscow	2011–12	Russian Second League	41	8	2	0	—		—		43	8
Lokomotiv-2 Moscow	2012–13	Russian Second League	9	0	3	0	—		—		12	0
Lokomotiv-2 Moscow	Total		106	11	8	1	—		—		114	12
Metallurg-Kuzbass	2012–13	Russian First League	11	0	—		—		—		11	0
Salyut Belgorod	2013–14	Russian First League	7	0	—		—		—		7	0
Metalurh Donetsk	2013–14	Ukrainian Premier League	18	0	1	0	—		—		19	0
Anzhi Makhachkala	2014–15	Russian First League	24	2	1	0	—		—		25	2
Anzhi Makhachkala	2015–16	Russian Premier League	4	0	1	0	—		—		5	0
Anzhi Makhachkala	Total		28	2	2	0	—		—		30	2
Kuban Krasnodar	2015–16	Russian Premier League	12	0	1	0	—		2 (Note: Appearances in the relegation play-offs)	0	15	0
Kuban Krasnodar	2016–17	Russian First League	23	0	0	0	—		—		23	0
Kuban Krasnodar	Total		35	0	1	0	—		2	0	38	0
Krylia Sovetov Samara	2016–17	Russian Premier League	10	1	—		—		—		10	1
Krylia Sovetov Samara	2017–18	Russian First League	36	3	4	0	—		5 (Note: Appearances in the FNL Cup)	0	45	3
Krylia Sovetov Samara	2018–19	Russian Premier League	26	0	2	0	—		2	0	30	0
Krylia Sovetov Samara	2019–20	Russian Premier League	0	0	—		—		—		0	0
Krylia Sovetov Samara	Total		72	4	6	0	—		7	0	85	4
Orenburg	2019–20	Russian Premier League	20	1	2	0	—		—		22	1
Rubin Kazan	2020–21	Russian Premier League	17	0	2	0	—		—		19	0
Rubin Kazan	2021–22	Russian Premier League	26	0	1	0	2 (Note: Appearances in the UEFA Conference League)	0	—		29	0
Rubin Kazan	Total		43	0	3	0	2	0	—		48	0
Krylia Sovetov Samara	2022–23	Russian Premier League	12	0	6	0	—		—		18	0
Krylia Sovetov Samara	2023–24	Russian Premier League	16	1	4	0	—		—		20	1
Krylia Sovetov Samara	Total		28	1	10	0	0	0	0	0	38	1
Orenburg	2024–25	Russian Premier League	7	0	6	0	—		—		13	0
Orenburg	2025–26	Russian Premier League	6	0	4	0	—		—		10	0
Orenburg	Total		13	0	10	0	0	0	0	0	23	0
Career total			381	19	43	1	2	0	9	0	435	20
