= Yury Shafinsky =

Russian footballer

Personal information
- Full name: Yury Nikolayevich Shafinsky
- Date of birth: 6 May 1994 (age 32)
- Place of birth: Moscow, Russia
- Height: 1.91 m (6 ft 3 in)
- Position: Goalkeeper

Youth career
- 2007–2009: FC Moscow
- 2009–2011: FC Torpedo Moscow
- 2011–2013: FC Lokomotiv Moscow

Senior career*
Years	Team	Apps	(Gls)
2013–2014	FC Lokomotiv-2 Moscow	3	(0)
2014–2015	FC Torpedo Moscow	3	(0)
2015–2017	FC Anzhi Makhachkala	0	(0)
2017–2018	FC Tom Tomsk	27	(0)
2019–2021	FC Ufa	0	(0)

International career
2011–2012	Russia U-18	3	(0)
- * Club domestic league appearances and goals

Yury Nikolayevich Shafinsky (Russian: Юрий Николаевич Шафинский; born 6 May 1994) is a Russian former football goalkeeper.

== Career ==
He made his debut in the Russian Second Division for FC Lokomotiv-2 Moscow on 5 November 2013 in a game against FC Pskov-747 Pskov.

On 12 August 2015, Shafinsky signed a four-year contract with FC Anzhi Makhachkala.

He made his Russian Football National League debut for FC Tom Tomsk on 8 July 2017 in a game against FC Kuban Krasnodar.

On 3 February 2019, he signed with FC Ufa.
