= Anton Kozorez =

Russian footballer

Personal information
- Full name: Anton Konstantinovich Kozorez
- Date of birth: 14 May 1983 (age 43)
- Place of birth: Blagoveshchensk, Russian SFSR
- Height: 1.93 m (6 ft 4 in)
- Position: Goalkeeper

Senior career*
Years	Team	Apps	(Gls)
2000–2006	FC Amur Blagoveshchensk	92	(0)
2007	FC Dynamo Vologda	6	(0)
2007	FC Atyrau	1	(0)
2008–2009	FC Amur Blagoveshchensk	23	(0)
2009–2015	FC SKA-Energiya Khabarovsk	78	(0)
- * Club domestic league appearances and goals

Anton Konstantinovich Kozorez (Russian: Антон Константинович Козорез; born 14 May 1983) is a former Russian professional footballer.

== Club career ==
He played 6 seasons in the Russian Football National League for FC Amur Blagoveshchensk and FC SKA-Energiya Khabarovsk.

== Honours ==
- Russian Second Division Zone East best goalkeeper: 2004.
