= Grigori Chirkin =

Russian professional footballer

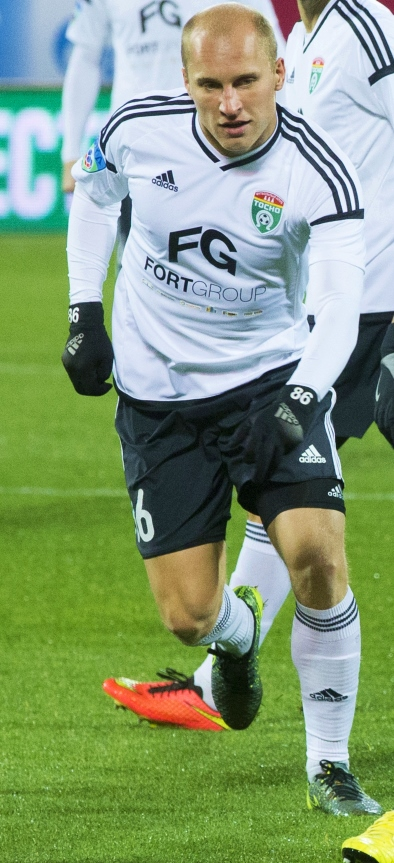
- Chirkin with FC Tosno in 2015

Personal information
- Full name: Grigori Aleksandrovich Chirkin
- Date of birth: 26 February 1986 (age 40)
- Place of birth: Novosibirsk, Soviet Union (now Russia)
- Height: 1.76 m (5 ft 9 in)
- Positions: Midfielder; defender

Youth career
- FC Lokomotiv Moscow

Senior career*
Years	Team	Apps	(Gls)
2004–2006	FC Lokomotiv Moscow	0	(0)
2006	FC SKA Rostov-on-Don	18	(2)
2007	FC Sibir Novosibirsk	11	(0)
2008	FK Rīga	19	(6)
2008	FC Dynamo Barnaul	5	(0)
2009–2011	FK Ventspils	40	(13)
2011	SK Dynamo České Budějovice	27	(3)
2012–2014	FC Baltika Kaliningrad	72	(3)
2014–2015	FC Anzhi Makhachkala	26	(0)
2015–2017	FC Tosno	45	(2)
2017–2019	FC Orenburg	44	(5)
2019–2020	FC Avangard Kursk	22	(0)
2020–2021	FC Dynamo Bryansk	19	(1)
2021–2022	FC Murom	31	(0)

International career
2005	Russia U-19	3	(0)
- * Club domestic league appearances and goals

Grigori Aleksandrovich Chirkin (Russian: Григорий Александрович Чиркин; born 26 February 1986) is a Russian former professional footballer. He played as a defensive midfielder.

== Career ==
He made his debut for the main squad of FC Lokomotiv Moscow on 12 November 2005 in the Russian Cup game against FC Metallurg-Kuzbass Novokuznetsk.

He appeared in every game in the 2009–10 UEFA Europa League group stage for the Latvian club FK Ventspils which was making its debut in the group stages of European competitions.

On 2 July 2014, Chirkin signed a two-year contract with Anzhi Makhachkala.

After spending the first 12 seasons of his career mostly in the second-tier Russian Football National League (other than portions of two seasons spent in Czech top division), he made his Russian Premier League debut for FC Orenburg on 28 July 2018 in a game against FC Spartak Moscow. He returned to the FNL after one season on the top level.
