= Sergei Miroshnichenko (footballer) =

Russian footballer

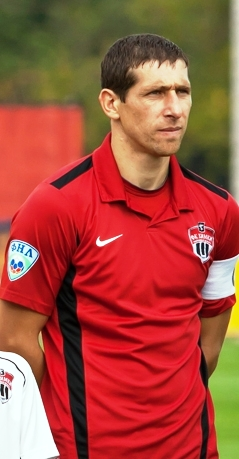
- Miroshnichenko in 2011

Personal information
- Full name: Sergei Nikolayevich Miroshnichenko
- Date of birth: 18 July 1982 (age 44)
- Place of birth: Maykop, Russian SFSR
- Height: 1.82 m (5 ft 11 1/2 in)
- Positions: Defender; midfielder

Team information
- Current team: FC Murom (manager)

Senior career*
Years	Team	Apps	(Gls)
2002–2003	FC Spartak Anapa	67	(9)
2004	FC Druzhba Maykop	13	(1)
2004–2005	FC Torpedo Volzhsky	30	(5)
2006	FC Gazovik Orenburg	23	(2)
2007–2008	FC Ural Sverdlovsk Oblast	64	(2)
2009–2010	FC Krasnodar	52	(4)
2011	FC Khimki	33	(1)
2012	FC Chernomorets Novorossiysk	8	(1)
2012–2013	FC Salyut Belgorod	37	(3)
2014	FC Dynamo St. Petersburg	10	(0)
2014–2015	FC Luch-Energiya Vladivostok	18	(0)
2015	FC Anzhi Makhachkala	4	(1)
2015–2019	FC Armavir	125	(27)

Managerial career
- 2022: FC Krasnodar-2 (assistant)
- 2022–2024: FC Krasnodar (youth)
- 2024–2025: FC Druzhba Maykop
- 2026–: FC Murom
- * Club domestic league appearances and goals

Sergei Nikolayevich Miroshnichenko (Russian: Серге́й Николаевич Мирошниченко; born 18 July 1982) is a Russian professional football coach and a former player. He is the manager of FC Murom.

== Career ==
He made his Russian Football National League debut for FC Ural Yekaterinburg on 31 March 2007 in a game against FC KAMAZ Naberezhnye Chelny.

On 27 January 2015, Miroshnichenko signed for FC Anzhi Makhachkala.
