= Magomed Muslimov =

Russian footballer

Personal information
- Full name: Magomed Dzhamaldinovich Muslimov
- Date of birth: 3 February 1992 (age 34)
- Place of birth: Makhachkala, Russia
- Height: 1.76 m (5 ft 9 in)
- Position: Midfielder

Youth career
- 2010–2012: FC Lokomotiv Moscow

Senior career*
Years	Team	Apps	(Gls)
2013–2014	FC Dagdizel Kaspiysk	27	(1)
2014–2015	FC Anzhi-2 Makhachkala	26	(2)
2014–2015	FC Anzhi Makhachkala	1	(0)
2016–2018	FC Legion-Dynamo Makhachkala	45	(2)
2020	FC Legion Dynamo Makhachkala	4	(0)
- * Club domestic league appearances and goals

Magomed Dzhamaldinovich Muslimov (Russian: Магомед Джамалдинович Муслимов; born 3 February 1992) is a Russian former football midfielder.

== Club career ==
He made his debut in the Russian Second Division for FC Dagdizel Kaspiysk on 12 July 2013 in a game against FC Taganrog.

He made his Russian Football National League debut for FC Anzhi Makhachkala on 30 May 2015 in a game against FC Sakhalin Yuzhno-Sakhalinsk.
