= Shamil Gasanov =

Russian footballer

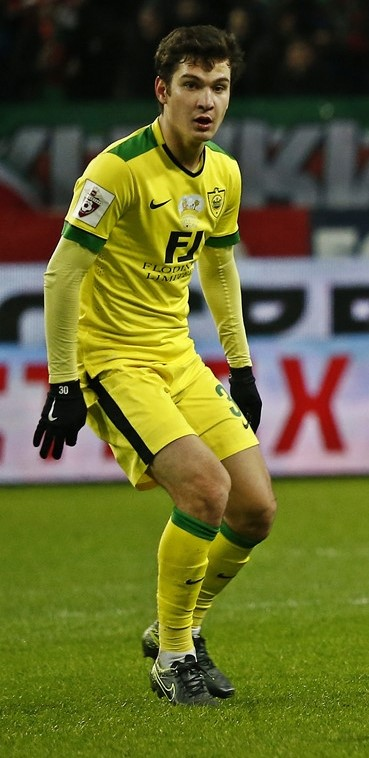
- Gasanov with Anzhi Makhachkala in 2016

Personal information
- Full name: Shamil Askhabovich Gasanov
- Date of birth: 30 July 1993 (age 33)
- Place of birth: Makhachkala, Russia
- Height: 1.85 m (6 ft 1 in)
- Positions: Defender; midfielder

Youth career
- –2007: Yuny Dinamovets Moscow
- 2007–2008: Sportakademklub Moscow
- 2008–2011: Vorobyovy Gory Moscow

Senior career*
Years	Team	Apps	(Gls)
2012–2013	Podolye Podolsky district	1	(0)
2013–2017	Anzhi Makhachkala	33	(0)
2014–2015	→ Anzhi-2 Makhachkala (loan)	26	(2)
2017–2018	Tromsø	0	(0)
2018–2019	Yenisey Krasnoyarsk	26	(0)
2019	→ Baltika Kaliningrad (loan)	9	(0)
2020	Chayka Peschanokopskoye	0	(0)
2020–2021	Legion Dynamo Makhachkala	38	(6)
2022	Dynamo Makhachkala	24	(1)
2023	Surkhon Termez	2	(0)
2024–2026	Legion Makhachkala	61	(5)
2026	Murom	10	(0)
- * Club domestic league appearances and goals as of 1 November 2026

Shamil Askhabovich Gasanov (Russian: Шамиль Асхабович Гасанов; born 30 July 1993) is a Russian football player who plays as a centre back.

== Club career ==
He made his debut in the Russian Second Division for FC Podolye Podolsky district on 11 October 2012 in a game against FC Metallurg-Oskol Stary Oskol.

He made his Russian Premier League debut for FC Anzhi Makhachkala on 18 October 2015 in a game against FC Krasnodar.

On 15 August 2017, he moved to Norway, signing with Tromsø until December 2017 with an option for a 3-year extension. He returned to Russia without playing any games in Norway and signed with FC Yenisey Krasnoyarsk in February 2018.

On 16 February 2019 he joined Baltika Kaliningrad on loan until the end of the 2018–19 season.

== Personal life ==
On 6 June 2023, Gasanov was arrested by police in Moscow after jaywalking and then charged with drug possession after a small quantity of methedrone was allegedly found on him.

On 22 September 2026, Gasanov was arrested again and charged with drug possession without intent to distribute. His contract with Murom was terminated.
