= Mikhail Komkov =

Russian footballer

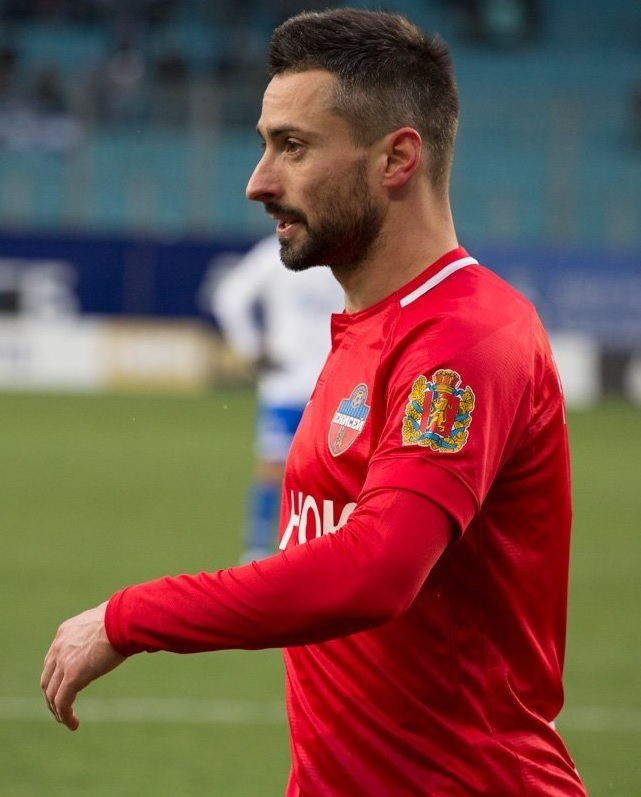
- Komkov with Yenisey in 2018

Personal information
- Full name: Mikhail Aleksandrovich Komkov
- Date of birth: 1 October 1984 (age 42)
- Place of birth: Krasnoyarsk, Russian SFSR
- Height: 1.75 m (5 ft 9 in)
- Positions: Midfielder; forward; winger

Senior career*
Years	Team	Apps	(Gls)
2002–2006	FC Metallurg Krasnoyarsk	120	(15)
2007–2009	FC KAMAZ Naberezhnye Chelny	66	(1)
2010–2011	FC Krasnodar	34	(8)
2011–2014	FC Kuban Krasnodar	16	(2)
2012–2013	→ FC Khimki (loan)	22	(3)
2013–2014	→ FC Tom Tomsk (loan)	13	(1)
2014	FC Tom Tomsk	4	(0)
2014–2015	FC Anzhi Makhachkala	19	(0)
2015–2016	FC Tosno	14	(3)
2016–2023	FC Yenisey Krasnoyarsk	120	(10)
2022–2023	FC Yenisey-2 Krasnoyarsk	19	(4)
- * Club domestic league appearances and goals

Mikhail Aleksandrovich Komkov (Russian: Михаил Александрович Комков; born 1 October 1984) is a Russian former professional footballer. He played as a wide midfielder.

== Club career ==
He made his professional debut in the Russian First Division in 2002 for FC Metallurg Krasnoyarsk.

He made his Russian Premier League debut for FC Krasnodar on 19 March 2011 in a game against PFC Spartak Nalchik.
