= Anvar Gazimagomedov =

Russian footballer

Personal information
- Full name: Anvar Anasovich Gazimagomedov
- Date of birth: 11 May 1988 (age 38)
- Place of birth: Makhachkala, Russian SFSR
- Height: 1.72 m (5 ft 8 in)
- Position: Midfielder

Senior career*
Years	Team	Apps	(Gls)
2007–2008	FC Krasnodar-2000	54	(6)
2009–2013	FC Dagdizel Kaspiysk	89	(6)
2010	→ FC MITOS Novocherkassk (loan)	22	(1)
2014–2016	FC Anzhi Makhachkala	25	(0)
2017	FC Armavir	7	(0)
2017–2018	FC Anzhi Makhachkala	0	(0)
2017	→ FC Anzhi-2 Makhachkala	13	(0)
2018	→ FC Legion Dynamo Makhachkala (loan)	10	(0)
2018	FC Legion Dynamo Makhachkala	10	(0)
2019–2020	FC Makhachkala	21	(3)
- * Club domestic league appearances and goals

Anvar Anasovich Gazimagomedov (Russian: Анвар Анасович Газимагомедов; born 11 May 1988) is a Russian former professional football player. He played as a right midfielder.

== Club career ==
He made his Russian Premier League debut for FC Anzhi Makhachkala on 18 March 2016 in a game against FC Spartak Moscow.

== Career statistics ==
=== Club ===
As of 9 December 2017

Club	Season	League			Cup		Continental		Total	
Club	Season	Division	Apps	Goals	Apps	Goals	Apps	Goals	Apps	Goals
FC Krasnodar-2000	2007	PFL	21	0	2	0	–		23	0
FC Krasnodar-2000	2008	PFL	33	6	1	0	–		34	6
FC Krasnodar-2000	Total		54	6	3	0	0	0	57	6
FC Dagdizel Kaspiysk	2009	PFL	11	3	0	0	–		11	3
FC MITOS Novocherkassk	2010	PFL	22	1	0	0	–		22	1
FC Dagdizel Kaspiysk	2011–12	PFL	30	1	1	0	–		31	1
FC Dagdizel Kaspiysk	2012–13	PFL	29	0	0	0	–		29	0
FC Dagdizel Kaspiysk	2013–14	PFL	19	2	4	0	–		23	2
FC Dagdizel Kaspiysk	Total (2 spells)		89	6	5	0	0	0	94	6
FC Anzhi Makhachkala	2013–14	Russian Premier League	0	0	0	0	0	0	0	0
FC Anzhi Makhachkala	2014–15	FNL	14	0	1	0	–		15	0
FC Anzhi Makhachkala	2015–16	Russian Premier League	5	0	0	0	–		5	0
FC Anzhi Makhachkala	2016–17	Russian Premier League	6	0	1	0	–		7	0
FC Armavir	2016–17	PFL	7	0	–		–		7	0
FC Anzhi Makhachkala	2017–18	Russian Premier League	0	0	1	0	–		1	0
FC Anzhi Makhachkala	Total (2 spells)		25	0	3	0	0	0	28	0
FC Anzhi-2 Makhachkala	2017–18	PFL	13	0	–		–		13	0
Career total			210	13	11	0	0	0	221	13
