= Aleksei Aravin =

Russian professional footballer

Aleksei Aravin Алексей Аравин
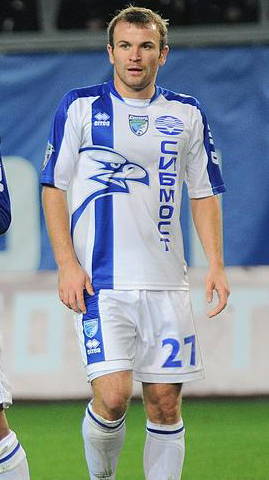

Personal information
- Full name: Aleksei Aleksandrovich Aravin
- Date of birth: 9 July 1986 (age 40)
- Place of birth: Ulyanovsk, Soviet Union
- Height: 1.85 m (6 ft 1 in)
- Position: Defender

Senior career*
Years	Team	Apps	(Gls)
2004–2006	FC Lokomotiv Moscow	0	(0)
2006	→ FC SKA Rostov-on-Don (loan)	19	(2)
2007–2010	FC Sibir Novosibirsk	85	(1)
2008	→ FC Volga Ulyanovsk (loan)	16	(0)
2011	FC Volga Nizhny Novgorod	3	(0)
2011–2012	PFC Spartak Nalchik	18	(0)
2012–2014	FC Tom Tomsk	35	(1)
2014–2015	FC Anzhi Makhachkala	32	(0)
2015–2017	FC Tosno	32	(0)
2017–2019	FC Sibir Novosibirsk	63	(0)
2019–2020	FC Luch Vladivostok	15	(0)
- * Club domestic league appearances and goals

Aleksei Aleksandrovich Aravin (Russian: Алексей Александрович Аравин; born 9 July 1986) is a Russian former professional footballer.

== Career ==
He played his first professional football game for the senior FC Lokomotiv Moscow team on 12 November 2005 in a Russian Cup matchup with FC Metallurg-Kuzbass Novokuznetsk.

He made his professional debut in the Russian Second Division in 2006 for FC SKA Rostov-on-Don. He played one game for FC Lokomotiv Moscow in the 2005-06 Russian Cup, and while on their reserve team, played 40 matches.

He made his Russian Premier League debut for FC Sibir Novosibirsk on 14 March 2010 in a game against FC Terek Grozny. In the 2010 season, Aravin played in 23 of the 30 matches. After qualifying, he played in Sibir's Europa League campaign, beginning with a match against FC Apollon. In July 2011, many media outlets reported that Aravin had renewed his contract with Sibir, but in reality, was in the process of signing on for a year with PFC Spartak Nalchik. He debuted with Spartak on August 13 in their winning match of the Russian championship games against FC Tom Tomsk.

On 2 July 2014, Aravin signed a two-year contract with Anzhi Makhachkala.
