= Dmitry Aydov =

Russian footballer (born 1982)

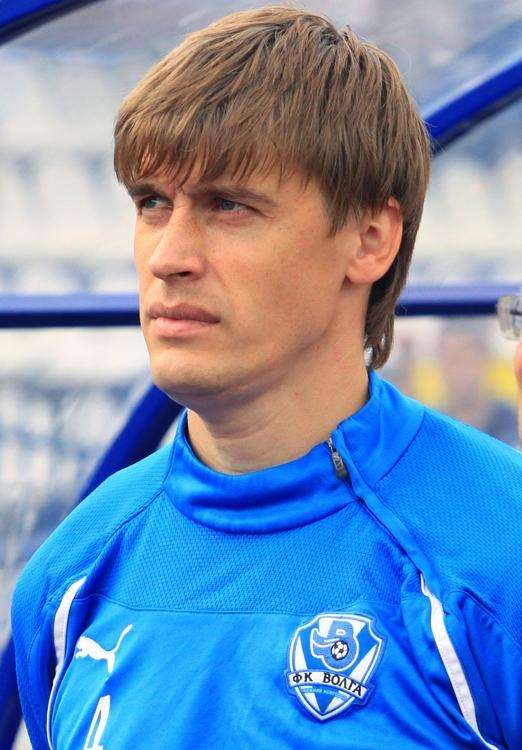
- Aydov with Volga NN in 2012

Personal information
- Full name: Dmitry Mikhaylovich Aydov
- Date of birth: 10 April 1982 (age 44)
- Place of birth: Gorky, Russian SFSR
- Height: 1.85 m (6 ft 1 in)
- Position: Defender

Senior career*
Years	Team	Apps	(Gls)
2001–2010	Volga Nizhny Novgorod	212	(22)
2010	→ Nizhny Novgorod (loan)	9	(2)
2011–2012	Nizhny Novgorod	31	(10)
2012–2013	Volga Nizhny Novgorod	15	(0)
2013–2014	Torpedo Moscow	38	(4)
2014–2015	Anzhi Makhachkala	26	(2)
2015–2018	Arsenal Tula	28	(5)
2017–2018	→ Gomel (loan)	28	(0)
2019	Lokomotiv-NN Nizhny Novgorod		
- * Club domestic league appearances and goals

Dmitry Mikhaylovich Aydov (Russian: Дми́трий Миха́йлович А́йдов; born 10 April 1982) is a Russian former professional association football player.

== Career ==
On 30 June 2015, Aydov left FC Anzhi Makhachkala, and signed a one-year contract with FC Arsenal Tula.

In November 2016, Aydov was accused of using racist language towards Amkar Perm players Sékou Condé and Fegor Ogude.

In November 2020, he was banned from any football activity by FIFA due to match fixing in the Belarusian Premier League.
