= Aleksandr Krivoruchko =

Russian footballer

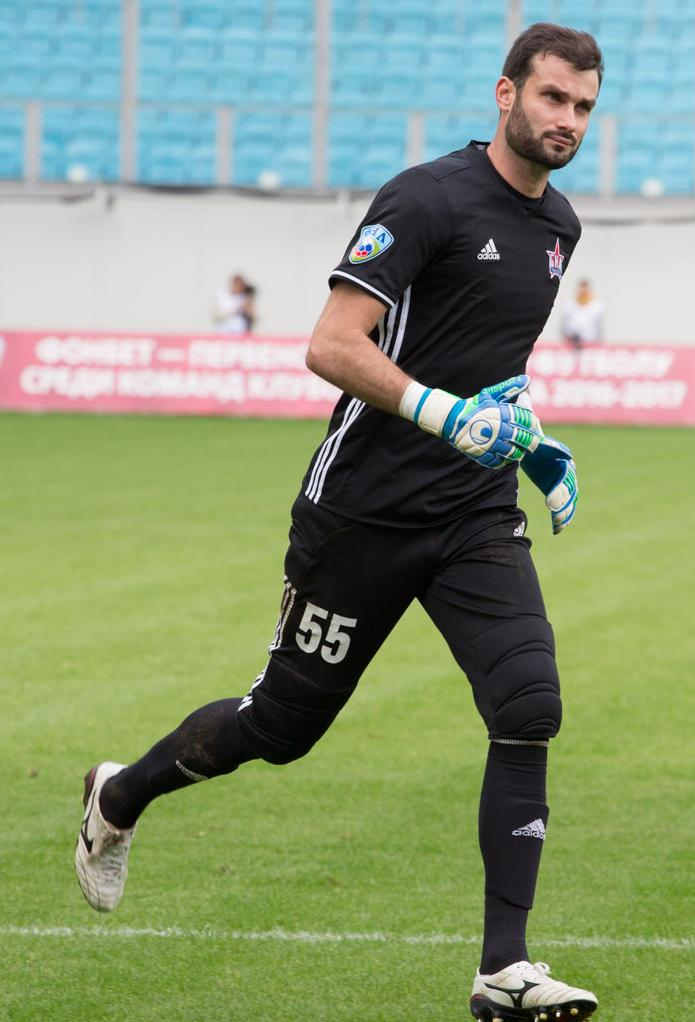
- Krivoruchko with SKA-Khabarovsk in 2016

Personal information
- Full name: Aleksandr Yuryevich Krivoruchko
- Date of birth: 23 September 1984 (age 42)
- Place of birth: Moscow, Russian SFSR
- Height: 1.91 m (6 ft 3 in)
- Position: Goalkeeper

Team information
- Current team: FC Lokomotiv Moscow (academy coach)

Senior career*
| Years | Team | Apps | (Gls) |
| 2001–2010 | FC Lokomotiv Moscow | 0 | (0) |
| 2004 | → FC Vityaz Podolsk (loan) | 26 | (0) |
| 2006 | → PFC Spartak Nalchik (loan) | 0 | (0) |
| 2007 | → FC Vityaz Podolsk (loan) | 3 | (0) |
| 2007 | → FC SOYUZ-Gazprom Izhevsk (loan) | 11 | (0) |
| 2008 | → FC Gazovik Orenburg (loan) | 5 | (0) |
| 2009 | → FC Lokomotiv-2 Moscow | 23 | (0) |
| 2011–2013 | FC Salyut Belgorod | 70 | (0) |
| 2014 | FC Fakel Voronezh | 10 | (0) |
| 2014–2016 | FC Anzhi Makhachkala | 4 | (0) |
| 2015–2016 | → FC Tom Tomsk (loan) | 11 | (0) |
| 2016–2018 | FC SKA-Khabarovsk | 28 | (0) |

International career
| 2005 | Russia U-21 | 1 | (0) |

Managerial career
- 2018–: FC Lokomotiv Moscow (academy)
- * Club domestic league appearances and goals

Aleksandr Yuryevich Krivoruchko (Russian: Александр Юрьевич Криворучко; born 23 September 1984) is a Russian professional football coach and a former goalkeeper. He works at the academy of FC Lokomotiv Moscow.

== Career ==
He was voted Lokomotiv-2 player of the year in 2009. On 5 February 2010, Krivoruchko was promoted to the main team of Lokomotiv. On 21 December 2010, he left the club.

Krivoruchko signed for Fakel Voronezh in January 2014. On 2 July 2014, Krivoruchko signed a two-year contract with Anzhi Makhachkala.

== Career statistics ==
As of 4 March 2018

| Club | Season | League | | | Cup | | Continental | | Total | |
| Club | Season | Division | Apps | Goals | Apps | Goals | Apps | Goals | Apps | Goals |
|---|---|---|---|---|---|---|---|---|---|---|
| Lokomotiv Moscow | 2001 | Russian Premier League | 0 | 0 | 0 | 0 | 0 | 0 | 0 | 0 |
| Lokomotiv Moscow | 2002 | Russian Premier League | 0 | 0 | 0 | 0 | 0 | 0 | 0 | 0 |
| Lokomotiv Moscow | 2003 | Russian Premier League | 0 | 0 | 0 | 0 | 0 | 0 | 0 | 0 |
| Vityaz Podolsk | 2004 | PFL | 26 | 0 | 1 | 0 | – | | 27 | 0 |
| Lokomotiv Moscow | 2005 | Russian Premier League | 0 | 0 | 0 | 0 | 0 | 0 | 0 | 0 |
| Spartak Nalchik | 2006 | Russian Premier League | 0 | 0 | 1 | 0 | – | | 1 | 0 |
| Vityaz Podolsk | 2007 | PFL | 3 | 0 | 2 | 0 | – | | 5 | 0 |
| Vityaz Podolsk | Total (2 spells) | | 29 | 0 | 3 | 0 | 0 | 0 | 32 | 0 |
| SOYUZ-Gazprom Izhevsk | 2007 | PFL | 11 | 0 | – | | – | | 11 | 0 |
| Gazovik Orenburg | 2008 | PFL | 5 | 0 | 4 | 0 | – | | 9 | 0 |
| Lokomotiv-2 Moscow | 2009 | PFL | 23 | 0 | 1 | 0 | – | | 24 | 0 |
| Lokomotiv Moscow | 2010 | Russian Premier League | 0 | 0 | 0 | 0 | 0 | 0 | 0 | 0 |
| Lokomotiv Moscow | Total (3 spells) | | 0 | 0 | 0 | 0 | 0 | 0 | 0 | 0 |
| Salyut Belgorod | 2011–12 | PFL | 21 | 0 | 0 | 0 | – | | 21 | 0 |
| Salyut Belgorod | 2012–13 | FNL | 27 | 0 | 2 | 0 | – | | 29 | 0 |
| Salyut Belgorod | 2013–14 | FNL | 22 | 0 | 1 | 0 | – | | 23 | 0 |
| Salyut Belgorod | Total | | 70 | 0 | 3 | 0 | 0 | 0 | 73 | 0 |
| Fakel Voronezh | 2013–14 | PFL | 10 | 0 | – | | – | | 10 | 0 |
| Anzhi Makhachkala | 2014–15 | FNL | 3 | 0 | 1 | 0 | – | | 4 | 0 |
| Anzhi Makhachkala | 2015–16 | Russian Premier League | 1 | 0 | – | | – | | 1 | 0 |
| Anzhi Makhachkala | Total | | 4 | 0 | 1 | 0 | 0 | 0 | 5 | 0 |
| Tom Tomsk | 2015–16 | FNL | 11 | 0 | – | | – | | 11 | 0 |
| SKA-Khabarovsk | 2016–17 | FNL | 23 | 0 | 0 | 0 | – | | 23 | 0 |
| SKA-Khabarovsk | 2017–18 | Russian Premier League | 3 | 0 | 3 | 0 | – | | 6 | 0 |
| SKA-Khabarovsk | Total | | 26 | 0 | 3 | 0 | 0 | 0 | 29 | 0 |
| Career total | | | 189 | 0 | 16 | 0 | 0 | 0 | 205 | 0 |
