= Yuri Udunyan =

Russian footballer

Personal information
- Full name: Yuri Karenovich Udunyan
- Date of birth: 25 August 1994 (age 32)
- Place of birth: Makhachkala, Russia
- Height: 1.73 m (5 ft 8 in)
- Positions: Midfielder; defender

Senior career*
Years	Team	Apps	(Gls)
2011–2016	Anzhi Makhachkala	1	(1)
2014–2015	→ Anzhi-2 Makhachkala (loan)	28	(3)
2015–2016	→ Khimik Dzerzhinsk (loan)	25	(0)
2016–2018	Legion Dynamo	74	(12)
2019	Veles Moscow	7	(1)
2019	→ Legion Dynamo (loan)	18	(2)
2020–2022	Legion Dynamo	58	(5)
2024–2025	Legion Makhachkala	1	(0)
2026	Nart Cherkessk	11	(0)
- * Club domestic league appearances and goals as of 4 July 2026

Yuri Karenovich Udunyan (Russian: Юрий Каренович Удунян; born 25 August 1994) is a Russian football player.

== Club career ==
He made his professional debut in the Russian Professional Football League for Anzhi-2 Makhachkala on 12 August 2014 in a game against Alania Vladikavkaz. He made his Russian Football National League debut for Anzhi Makhachkala on 30 May 2015 in a game against Sakhalin Yuzhno-Sakhalinsk and scored on his second-tier debut.
