= Maksim Andreyev =

Russian professional football player

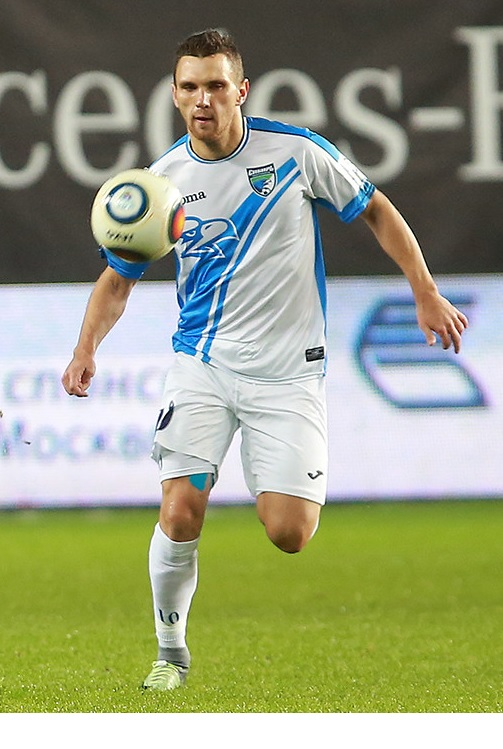
- Andreyev with Sibir in 2016

Personal information
- Full name: Maksim Vladimirovich Andreyev
- Date of birth: 19 January 1988 (age 38)
- Place of birth: Leningrad, Soviet Union
- Height: 1.80 m (5 ft 11 in)
- Position: Midfielder

Team information
- Current team: Murom
- Number: 10

Youth career
- 2005–2007: Zenit Saint Petersburg

Senior career*
Years	Team	Apps	(Gls)
2006–2007	Zenit-2 Saint Petersburg	50	(18)
2008	Torpedo Moscow	25	(1)
2009	Vityaz Podolsk	10	(1)
2010	Dynamo Saint Petersburg	12	(0)
2011–2013	Petrotrest Saint Petersburg	75	(18)
2013	Salyut Belgorod	22	(4)
2014	Dynamo Saint Petersburg	30	(8)
2015	Anzhi Makhachkala	6	(0)
2015–2016	Sokol Saratov	38	(3)
2016–2018	Sibir Novosibirsk	59	(4)
2018	Gomel	11	(0)
2019	Tom Tomsk	9	(0)
2019	Kolomna	11	(2)
2020–2021	Lokomotiv Daugavpils	12	(7)
2021–2024	Zvezda Saint Petersburg	105	(41)
2025–2026	Cherepovets	28	(11)
2026–	Murom	22	(3)

International career
2006	Russia U-18	9	(0)
2007	Russia U-19	7	(1)
- * Club domestic league appearances and goals as of 1 November 2026

Maksim Vladimirovich Andreyev (Russian: Максим Владимирович Андреев; born 19 January 1988) is a Russian professional football player who plays for Murom.

== Club career ==
=== Torpedo Moscow ===
He made his Russian Football National League debut for FC Torpedo Moscow on 16 April 2008 in a game against FC Metallurg-Kuzbass Novokuznetsk.

=== Salyut Belgorod ===
On 30 October 2013, Andreev scored the only goal in Russian Cup match vs Dynamo Moscow to book his team place in the last 16 stage of the competition.

=== Dynamo Saint Petersburg ===
On 13 February 2014, Dynamo St.Petersburg announced signing Andreyev on permanent basis.

=== Anzhi Makhachkala ===
On 29 December 2014, Andreyev signed a six-month contract with FC Anzhi Makhachkala, with the option of extending the contract for another year.
