= Roman Kontsedalov =

Russian footballer

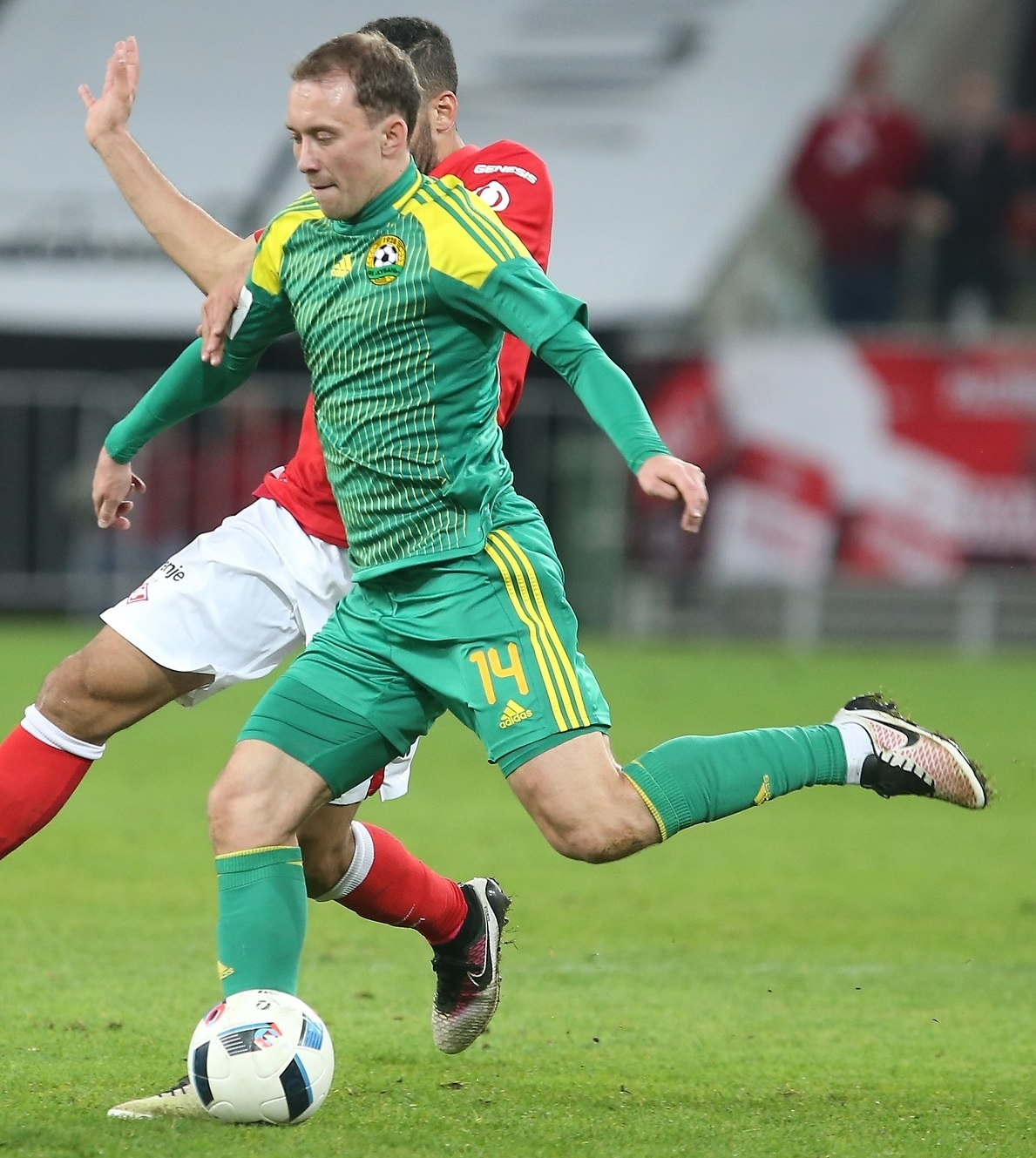
- Kontsedalov playing for Kuban in 2016

Personal information
- Full name: Roman Igorevich Kontsedalov
- Date of birth: 11 May 1986 (age 40)
- Place of birth: Valuyki, Soviet Union
- Height: 1.81 m (5 ft 11 in)
- Position: Midfielder

Senior career*
Years	Team	Apps	(Gls)
2003	FC Titan Moscow	0	(0)
2004–2009	FC Lokomotiv Moscow	12	(0)
2005–2006	→ PFC Spartak Nalchik (loan)	47	(8)
2008	→ FC Tom Tomsk (loan)	17	(0)
2009	→ PFC Spartak Nalchik (loan)	22	(0)
2010–2013	PFC Spartak Nalchik	76	(11)
2012	→ FC Mordovia Saransk (loan)	8	(0)
2013–2015	FC Volga Nizhny Novgorod	29	(1)
2015	→ FC Anzhi Makhachkala (loan)	12	(0)
2015	FC Energomash Belgorod	9	(3)
2016	FC Kuban Krasnodar	9	(0)
2017	FC Energomash Belgorod	7	(5)
2017–2018	FC Rotor Volgograd	18	(0)

International career
2006–2007	Russia U-21	9	(1)
2011	Russia-2	1	(0)
- * Club domestic league appearances and goals

Roman Igorevich Kontsedalov (Russian: Роман Игоревич Концедалов; born 11 May 1986) is a Russian former footballer. His position was midfielder.

== Career ==
On 16 January 2015, Kontsedalov moved to FC Anzhi Makhachkala on loan from FC Volga Nizhny Novgorod.

== Personal life ==
His younger brother Aleksei Kontsedalov is also a professional football player.
