= Murad Kurbanov =

Russian footballer

Personal information
- Full name: Murad Magomedkhabibovich Kurbanov
- Date of birth: 22 March 1992 (age 34)
- Height: 1.74 m (5 ft 8 1/2 in)
- Position: Defender

Senior career*
Years	Team	Apps	(Gls)
2010–2016	Anzhi Makhachkala	1	(0)
2014–2015	→ Anzhi-2 (loan)	26	(0)
2015–2016	→ Khimik Dzerzhinsk (loan)	21	(0)
2017	NK Metalleghe-BSI	0	(0)
- * Club domestic league appearances and goals

Murad Magomedkhabibovich Kurbanov (Russian: Мурад Магомедхабибович Курбанов; born 22 March 1992) is a former Russian footballer of Azeri ethnic origin.

== Career ==
Murad Kurbanov made his professional debut for Anzhi Makhachkala on 14 July 2010 in the Russian Cup game against Pskov-747. He made his Russian Football National League debut for Anzhi on 30 May 2015 in a game against FC Sakhalin Yuzhno-Sakhalinsk.
