= List of Russian football transfers winter 2018–19 =

This is a list of Russian football transfers in the 2018–19 winter transfer window by club. Only clubs of the 2018–19 Russian Premier League are included.

== Russian Premier League 2018–19 ==
=== Akhmat Grozny ===
In: Note: Flags indicate national team as defined under FIFA eligibility rules; some limited exceptions apply. Players may hold more than one non-FIFA nationality.

No.	Pos.	Nation	Player
8	MF	POL	Damian Szymański (from (Poland) Wisła Płock)
21	MF	ALB	Odise Roshi (return from injury)
64	MF	RUS	Israpil Asadov
74	DF	RUS	Georgi Chetvergov (from Lokomotiv Moscow)

Out: Note: Flags indicate national team as defined under FIFA eligibility rules; some limited exceptions apply. Players may hold more than one non-FIFA nationality.

No.	Pos.	Nation	Player
8	MF	CIV	Idrissa Doumbia (to (Portugal) Sporting)
9	FW	RUS	Zaur Sadayev (on loan to (Turkey) Ankaragücü)
27	FW	RUS	Idris Umayev (on loan to (Lithuania) Palanga)
70	MF	RUS	Ayub Batsuyev (on loan to Chayka Peschanokopskoye)
98	MF	RUS	Chingiz Magomadov (to Ural Yekaterinburg)

=== Anzhi Makhachkala ===
In: Note: Flags indicate national team as defined under FIFA eligibility rules; some limited exceptions apply. Players may hold more than one non-FIFA nationality.

No.	Pos.	Nation	Player
4	DF	RUS	Anton Belov (end of loan to Zorky Krasnogorsk)
7	FW	ARG	Juan Lescano (end of loan to (Kazakhstan) Tobol)
8	MF	RUS	Shakhban Gaydarov (end of loan to Legion-Dynamo Makhachkala)
17	FW	RUS	Ivan Ivanchenko (end of loan to Zvezda Perm)
25	DF	RUS	Magomed Elmurzayev
33	FW	RUS	Dzhamal Dzhafarov
34	MF	RUS	Aliaskhab Dubukhov
35	MF	RUS	Salautdin Batyrbekov
42	MF	RUS	Abdulakh Khaybulayev
47	DF	RUS	Radzhab Gusengadzhiyev
53	DF	RUS	Shamil Abdurazakov
59	MF	RUS	Tamerlan Musayev
63	MF	RUS	Dzhamalutdin Dzhabrailov
64	DF	RUS	Umar Magomedbekov
65	GK	RUS	Aleksandr Shchipakhin
74	MF	RUS	Abu-Said Eldarushev
75	DF	RUS	Said Shikhaliyev
97	MF	RUS	Magomed Magomedov (end of loan to Legion-Dynamo Makhachkala)

Out: Note: Flags indicate national team as defined under FIFA eligibility rules; some limited exceptions apply. Players may hold more than one non-FIFA nationality.

No.	Pos.	Nation	Player
2	DF	RUS	Guram Tetrashvili (to (Belarus) Gomel)
4	DF	VEN	Jhon Chancellor (to (Qatar) Al Ahli)
7	FW	UZB	Dostonbek Khamdamov (to (Uzbekistan) Pakhtakor Tashkent)
15	MF	RUS	Danil Glebov (to Rostov)
16	GK	RUS	Vladimir Sugrobov (to Baltika Kaliningrad)
17	MF	UKR	Ihor Chaykovskyi (to (Ukraine) Zorya Luhansk)
20	MF	GHA	Mohammed Rabiu (to Krylia Sovetov)
24	MF	RUS	Konstantin Savichev (to Yenisey Krasnoyarsk)
25	DF	RUS	Ivan Novoseltsev (end of loan from Zenit St. Petersburg)
27	FW	RUS	Amir Mokhammad (on loan to Legion Dynamo Makhachkala)
42	MF	RUS	Nikita Adamov (to Rotor-2 Volgograd)
47	MF	RUS	Zikrula Magomedov (to Legion Dynamo Makhachkala)
53	GK	RUS	Nikita Repin (to Rotor-2 Volgograd)
90	FW	RUS	Said Aliyev (to Legion Dynamo Makhachkala)
—	FW	GEO	Nikoloz Kutateladze (to (Ukraine) Dynamo Kyiv, previously from (France) Paris Saint-Germain U17)

=== Arsenal Tula ===
In: Note: Flags indicate national team as defined under FIFA eligibility rules; some limited exceptions apply. Players may hold more than one non-FIFA nationality.

No.	Pos.	Nation	Player
13	DF	BLR	Maksim Valadzko (from (Belarus) BATE)
26	DF	BFA	Bakary Koné (from (Turkey) Ankaragücü)
35	GK	RUS	Denis Mukhin (from Krasnodar)
66	FW	RUS	Stanislav Krokhin (from Dynamo Moscow)
68	MF	RUS	Ilya Bykovsky
73	DF	RUS	Arseni Levshuk (from Spartak Moscow academy)
74	FW	RUS	Ruslan Kul (from Lokomotiv Moscow)
76	MF	RUS	Vladimir Laptev
79	MF	RUS	Yuri Yevdokimov
81	MF	RUS	Timur Farrakhov (from Yenisey Krasnoyarsk)
86	DF	RUS	Timofey Prokopenko
94	MF	RUS	Georgy Sulakvelidze
95	FW	RUS	Daniil Pavlov

Out: Note: Flags indicate national team as defined under FIFA eligibility rules; some limited exceptions apply. Players may hold more than one non-FIFA nationality.

No.	Pos.	Nation	Player
31	MF	RUS	Yegor Prilepsky
33	DF	RUS	Artyom Sokol (on loan to (Norway) Tromsø)
43	MF	RUS	Konstantin Markin
57	MF	RUS	Kirill Orekhov (to (Belarus) Torpedo Minsk)
63	MF	RUS	Dzhamshed Maksumov (to (Tajikistan) Istiklol)
69	FW	RUS	Nikita Yeryomenko
87	MF	RUS	Yuri Petrovskiy
89	FW	RUS	Luchano Bobrov (to Khimki-M)

=== CSKA Moscow ===
In: Note: Flags indicate national team as defined under FIFA eligibility rules; some limited exceptions apply. Players may hold more than one non-FIFA nationality.

No.	Pos.	Nation	Player
18	FW	MLI	Lassana N'Diaye (from (Mali) Guidars)
33	GK	RUS	Nikolai Radchenko
65	FW	RUS	Ilya Vostrikov
67	DF	RUS	Konstantin Yerokhin
68	DF	RUS	Nikita Abramushkin
73	DF	RUS	Aleksandr Silyanov
78	DF	RUS	Igor Diveyev (on loan from Ufa)

Out: Note: Flags indicate national team as defined under FIFA eligibility rules; some limited exceptions apply. Players may hold more than one non-FIFA nationality.

No.	Pos.	Nation	Player
31	MF	RUS	Aleksandr Makarov (on loan to Avangard Kursk)
48	FW	LVA	Oskars Rubenis
52	DF	RUS	Daniil Fyodorov (to Dynamo Moscow)
70	MF	RUS	Timur Pukhov (to (Lithuania) Žalgiris)
72	MF	RUS	Astemir Gordyushenko (on loan to Tyumen)
75	FW	RUS	Timur Zhamaletdinov (on loan to (Poland) Lech Poznań)
78	DF	RUS	Ivan Maklakov (to Zenit St. Petersburg)
80	MF	RUS	Khetag Khosonov (on loan to Tambov)
82	MF	RUS	Ivan Oleynikov (on loan to Fakel Voronezh)
84	GK	RUS	Pavel Ovchinnikov
91	FW	RUS	Artyom Popov (end of loan from Khimki)
92	FW	RUS	Dmitri Merenchukov
95	GK	RUS	Maksim Yedapin (on loan to Yenisey Krasnoyarsk)

=== Dynamo Moscow ===
In: Note: Flags indicate national team as defined under FIFA eligibility rules; some limited exceptions apply. Players may hold more than one non-FIFA nationality.

No.	Pos.	Nation	Player
6	MF	RUS	Artur Yusupov (from Rostov)
52	DF	RUS	Daniil Fyodorov (from CSKA Moscow)
57	GK	RUS	Pyotr Kudakovskiy
65	DF	RUS	Ivan Yurchenko (from Chertanovo-2 Moscow)
68	MF	RUS	Vladislav Lepyokhin
70	FW	RUS	Konstantin Tyukavin
75	DF	RUS	Robinzon Zvonkov
92	MF	RUS	Vladislav Galkin

Out: Note: Flags indicate national team as defined under FIFA eligibility rules; some limited exceptions apply. Players may hold more than one non-FIFA nationality.

No.	Pos.	Nation	Player
64	FW	RUS	Stanislav Krokhin (to Arsenal Tula)
91	FW	RUS	Mikhail Ageyev (to Lokomotiv Moscow)

=== Krasnodar ===
In: Note: Flags indicate national team as defined under FIFA eligibility rules; some limited exceptions apply. Players may hold more than one non-FIFA nationality.

No.	Pos.	Nation	Player
11	DF	RUS	Dmitri Skopintsev (from Rostov)
14	MF	SWE	Kristoffer Olsson (from (Sweden) AIK)
19	FW	RUS	Mikhail Bersnev
21	FW	RUS	Oleg Oznobikhin
23	MF	RUS	Vyacheslav Yakimov (from Urozhay Ivanovskaya)
24	MF	RUS	Dmitri Kratkov
25	GK	RUS	Nikita Kokarev
26	FW	RUS	Islam-Bek Gubzhokov
27	DF	RUS	Nikita Furin
28	DF	RUS	Maksim Khramtsov
29	FW	RUS	Maksim Azarenko
30	GK	RUS	Valentin Grishin
41	DF	RUS	Azamat Gayev
49	FW	RUS	Stepan Komar
54	MF	RUS	Valeri Fomenko
55	DF	RUS	Bogdan Logachyov
80	FW	RUS	Aleksandr Butenko (end of loan to (Moldova) Milsami Orhei)
91	MF	RUS	Nikita Plotnikov

Out: Note: Flags indicate national team as defined under FIFA eligibility rules; some limited exceptions apply. Players may hold more than one non-FIFA nationality.

No.	Pos.	Nation	Player
20	MF	PER	Christian Cueva (on loan to (Brazil) Santos)
23	MF	RUS	Anatoli Katrich (to Ural Yekaterinburg)
27	DF	RUS	Pavel Dashin
28	DF	RUS	Denis Vlasov
29	FW	RUS	Ruslan Arzumanov
41	DF	RUS	Aleksei Tatayev (on loan to (Czech Republic) Mladá Boleslav)
49	DF	RUS	Roman Shishkin (on loan to Krylia Sovetov Samara)
54	MF	RUS	Roman Kurazhov (on loan to Sokol Saratov)
70	MF	GEO	Tornike Okriashvili
80	GK	RUS	Denis Mukhin (to Arsenal Tula)
90	DF	NOR	Stefan Strandberg (on loan to Ural Yekaterinburg)
91	MF	RUS	Nikita Molochnikov
—	MF	RUS	Oleg Lanin (on loan to Khimki, previously on loan to Krylia Sovetov Samara)
—	MF	SRB	Mihailo Ristić (to (France) Montpellier, previously on loan to (Czech Republic) Sparta Prague)
—	FW	RUS	Nikolay Komlichenko (to (Czech Republic) Mladá Boleslav, previously on loan)

=== Krylia Sovetov Samara ===
In: Note: Flags indicate national team as defined under FIFA eligibility rules; some limited exceptions apply. Players may hold more than one non-FIFA nationality.

No.	Pos.	Nation	Player
10	MF	GEO	Jano Ananidze (on loan from Spartak Moscow)
13	MF	GHA	Mohammed Rabiu (from Anzhi Makhachkala)
19	MF	RUS	Aleksandr Samedov (from Spartak Moscow)
40	MF	RUS	Artyom Timofeyev (on loan from Spartak Moscow)
49	DF	RUS	Roman Shishkin (on loan from Krasnodar)
70	MF	RUS	Anton Zinkovskiy (from Chertanovo Moscow)
79	GK	RUS	Nikita Pishchulin
82	DF	RUS	Daniil Matveyev (from Kolomna)
83	MF	RUS	Nikita Stroyev
84	FW	RUS	Pavel Zuyev (from Dolgoprudny-2)
85	FW	RUS	Yegor Novikov (from Krasnodar academy)
86	FW	RUS	Bogdan Chinarev
87	DF	RUS	Ilya Kotkin
95	DF	RUS	Maksim Karpov (from Zenit St. Petersburg)

Out: Note: Flags indicate national team as defined under FIFA eligibility rules; some limited exceptions apply. Players may hold more than one non-FIFA nationality.

No.	Pos.	Nation	Player
3	DF	RUS	Georgi Tigiyev (end of loan from Spartak Moscow)
4	MF	RUS	Yevgeni Bashkirov (to Rubin Kazan)
6	DF	BRA	Nadson (to (Finland) SJK)
7	FW	RUS	Aleksandr Sobolev (on loan to Yenisey Krasnoyarsk)
9	MF	RUS	Alan Chochiyev (to (Belarus) Dinamo Minsk)
20	MF	SRB	Srđan Mijailović
42	DF	RUS	Vsevolod Gruzdev
49	FW	RUS	Nikita Kireyev (to Murom)
51	GK	RUS	Yegor Lyubakov (to Murom)
54	MF	RUS	Denis Kravchenko
56	MF	RUS	Ilya Buryukin (to Irtysh Omsk)
57	MF	RUS	Ilya Volnov
64	MF	RUS	Oleg Lanin (end of loan from Krasnodar)
65	MF	RUS	Yevgeni Priymak
89	MF	FRA	Yohan Mollo (to (France) Sochaux)
—	DF	UKR	Dmytro Nyemchaninov (to (Ukraine) Desna Chernihiv, previously on loan to (Ukraine) Olimpik Donetsk)

=== Lokomotiv Moscow ===
In: Note: Flags indicate national team as defined under FIFA eligibility rules; some limited exceptions apply. Players may hold more than one non-FIFA nationality.

No.	Pos.	Nation	Player
21	MF	GEO	Khvicha Kvaratskhelia (on loan from (Georgia (country)) Rustavi)
39	DF	RUS	Pavel Khodeyev
41	MF	RUS	Mikhail Maltsev
50	MF	RUS	Denis Faizullin
60	GK	RUS	Andrey Savin (from Nosta Novotroitsk)
68	MF	RUS	Nikita Iosifov
80	FW	RUS	Zagir Gereykhanov
85	MF	RUS	Yevgeny Morozov
90	FW	RUS	Maksim Turishchev
92	FW	RUS	Mikhail Ageyev (from Dynamo Moscow)

Out: Note: Flags indicate national team as defined under FIFA eligibility rules; some limited exceptions apply. Players may hold more than one non-FIFA nationality.

No.	Pos.	Nation	Player
26	MF	RUS	Leonid Furtsev (to Strogino Moscow)
34	DF	RUS	Timofei Margasov (on loan to Sochi)
39	FW	RUS	Sergei Bely
41	MF	RUS	Kirill Klimov (to (Belgium) Cercle Brugge)
53	MF	RUS	Aleksei Lomakin (died)
58	MF	RUS	Timur Lobanov
60	DF	RUS	Maks Dziov
68	DF	RUS	Georgi Chetvergov (to Akhmat Grozny)
85	DF	RUS	Yaroslav Garastyuk
92	MF	RUS	Ruslan Kul (to Arsenal Tula)
—	MF	RUS	Alan Kasaev (on loan to Sochi, previously on loan to Baltika Kaliningrad)
—	FW	RUS	Igor Portnyagin (on loan to Baltika Kaliningrad, previously on loan to Khimki)

=== Orenburg ===
In: Note: Flags indicate national team as defined under FIFA eligibility rules; some limited exceptions apply. Players may hold more than one non-FIFA nationality.

No.	Pos.	Nation	Player
60	DF	RUS	Savely Kozlov (from Tyumen)
61	FW	RUS	Denis Streltsov
68	DF	RUS	Nikita Bodnaryuk

Out: Note: Flags indicate national team as defined under FIFA eligibility rules; some limited exceptions apply. Players may hold more than one non-FIFA nationality.

No.	Pos.	Nation	Player
38	DF	RUS	Daniil Krivoruchko (to Nosta Novotroitsk)
66	MF	RUS	Mikhail Bakayev

=== Rostov ===
In: Note: Flags indicate national team as defined under FIFA eligibility rules; some limited exceptions apply. Players may hold more than one non-FIFA nationality.

No.	Pos.	Nation	Player
7	MF	FIN	Roman Eremenko (from Spartak Moscow)
8	MF	BUL	Ivelin Popov (from Spartak Moscow)
15	MF	RUS	Danil Glebov (from Anzhi Makhachkala)
17	MF	NOR	Mathias Normann (from (England) Brighton & Hove Albion)
19	MF	KAZ	Baktiyar Zaynutdinov (from (Kazakhstan) Astana)
24	DF	SVN	Miha Mevlja (on loan from Zenit St. Petersburg)
28	DF	RUS	Yevgeni Chernov (from Zenit St. Petersburg)
33	DF	RUS	Konstantin Pliyev (end of loan to Baltika Kaliningrad)
49	MF	RUS	Konstantin Baydak
51	MF	RUS	Yevgeni Cherkes (from Salyut Belgorod)
54	DF	RUS	Ilya Nelin (own youth)
62	DF	RUS	Nikita Beletskiy
68	MF	RUS	Vladislav Morozov
75	DF	RUS	Dmitri Meshkov (own youth)
80	DF	RUS	Ivan Novoseltsev (on loan from Zenit St. Petersburg)

Out: Note: Flags indicate national team as defined under FIFA eligibility rules; some limited exceptions apply. Players may hold more than one non-FIFA nationality.

No.	Pos.	Nation	Player
7	MF	RUS	Artur Yusupov (to Dynamo Moscow)
8	MF	RUS	Ayaz Guliyev (to Spartak Moscow)
15	DF	ISL	Sverrir Ingi Ingason (to (Greece) PAOK)
17	MF	SWE	Anton Salétros (on loan to (Sweden) AIK)
20	DF	SVN	Žan Majer (to (Italy) Lecce)
21	DF	SVN	Matija Boben (on loan to (Italy) Livorno)
23	FW	ISL	Viðar Örn Kjartansson (on loan to (Sweden) Hammarby)
49	DF	RUS	Dmitri Tananeyev (to Chayka Peschanokopskoye)
51	MF	RUS	Sergei Lukyanov
62	GK	RUS	Artyom Yesaulenko
64	MF	RUS	Andrei Napolov
68	MF	RUS	Ruslan Fishchenko
75	FW	RUS	Dzhambulat Dulayev
77	DF	RUS	Dmitri Skopintsev (to Krasnodar)
79	GK	RUS	Daniil Frolkin

=== Rubin Kazan ===
In: Note: Flags indicate national team as defined under FIFA eligibility rules; some limited exceptions apply. Players may hold more than one non-FIFA nationality.

No.	Pos.	Nation	Player
1	GK	RUS	David Volk
6	MF	RUS	Yevgeni Bashkirov (from Krylia Sovetov Samara)
8	MF	RUS	Vladislav Panteleyev (from Spartak Moscow)
9	MF	RUS	Roman Akbashev (from Avangard Kursk)
72	FW	RUS	Nikita Tsygankov
79	GK	RUS	Edgar Rakhmatullin
81	GK	RUS	Tagir Khismatullin
82	MF	RUS	Roman Baluyev
83	DF	RUS	Ruslan Gavrilov
84	MF	RUS	Stepan Surikov
85	MF	RUS	Artur Maksimchuk
86	DF	RUS	Vyacheslav Fomin
90	MF	RUS	Danil Kamantsev
92	MF	RUS	Anton Sholokh
94	FW	RUS	Artur Rashitov
95	MF	RUS	Anton Adarichev
96	DF	RUS	Danila Karyagin
99	GK	RUS	Nikita Yanovich

Out: Note: Flags indicate national team as defined under FIFA eligibility rules; some limited exceptions apply. Players may hold more than one non-FIFA nationality.

No.	Pos.	Nation	Player
4	DF	ESP	Chico
16	GK	RUS	Timur Akmurzin (on loan to Ufa)
20	FW	IRN	Sardar Azmoun (to Zenit St. Petersburg)
25	GK	RUS	Aleksei Gorodovoy (on loan to Zenit St. Petersburg, previously from (Norway) Kongsvinger)
30	DF	RUS	Fyodor Kudryashov (to (Turkey) İstanbul Başakşehir)
35	GK	RUS	Soslan Dzhanayev (to (Poland) Miedź Legnica)
43	DF	RUS	Grigori Ziganshin (to KAMAZ Naberezhnye Chelny)
44	DF	ESP	César Navas (retired)
93	MF	RUS	Ilya Gilyazutdinov (to (Czech Republic) Vlašim)
—	FW	RUS	Nikita Goldobin (to Zvezda Perm, previously on loan)

=== Spartak Moscow ===
In: Note: Flags indicate national team as defined under FIFA eligibility rules; some limited exceptions apply. Players may hold more than one non-FIFA nationality.

No.	Pos.	Nation	Player
6	DF	BRA	Ayrton Lucas (from (Brazil) Fluminense)
7	MF	RUS	Ayaz Guliyev (from Rostov)
15	MF	RUS	Maksim Glushenkov (from Chertanovo Moscow)
42	MF	RUS	Vladislav Vasilyev (from Dnepr Smolensk)
54	MF	RUS	Nail Umyarov (from Chertanovo Moscow)
71	MF	RUS	Stepan Melnikov
73	MF	RUS	Aslan Mutaliyev
84	MF	RUS	Stepan Oganesyan (from UOR #5 Yegoryevsk)
85	GK	RUS	Aleksandr Alekseyev

Out: Note: Flags indicate national team as defined under FIFA eligibility rules; some limited exceptions apply. Players may hold more than one non-FIFA nationality.

No.	Pos.	Nation	Player
3	DF	SRB	Marko Petković
7	MF	GEO	Jano Ananidze (on loan to Krylia Sovetov Samara)
19	MF	RUS	Aleksandr Samedov (to Krylia Sovetov Samara)
26	MF	FIN	Roman Eremenko (to Rostov)
40	MF	RUS	Artyom Timofeyev (on loan to Krylia Sovetov Samara)
44	DF	RUS	Aleksandr Likhachyov (to Tyumen)
45	MF	FIN	Sergei Eremenko (end of loan from (Latvia) Spartaks Jūrmala)
71	MF	BUL	Ivelin Popov (to Rostov)
83	MF	RUS	Vladislav Panteleyev (to Rubin Kazan)
85	FW	RUS	Nikita Sudarikov
—	DF	RUS	Georgi Tigiyev (on loan to (Belarus) Dinamo Minsk, previously on loan to Krylia Sovetov Samara)
—	FW	RUS	Denis Davydov (to Nizhny Novgorod, previously on loan to (Latvia) Spartaks Jūrmala)

=== Ufa ===
In: Note: Flags indicate national team as defined under FIFA eligibility rules; some limited exceptions apply. Players may hold more than one non-FIFA nationality.

No.	Pos.	Nation	Player
16	GK	RUS	Yury Shafinsky (from Tom Tomsk)
30	GK	RUS	Gleb Yefimov (end of loan to Zorky Krasnogorsk)
32	FW	SVN	Andrés Vombergar (from (Slovenia) Olimpija Ljubljana)
88	GK	RUS	Timur Akmurzin (on loan from Rubin Kazan)

Out: Note: Flags indicate national team as defined under FIFA eligibility rules; some limited exceptions apply. Players may hold more than one non-FIFA nationality.

No.	Pos.	Nation	Player
10	FW	KAZ	Yerkebulan Seydakhmet (on loan to (Bulgaria) Levski Sofia)
20	DF	RUS	Denis Tumasyan (to (Armenia) Alashkert)
58	DF	RUS	Nikita Nedorezkov
60	MF	RUS	Vladimir Zubarev
63	GK	RUS	Nikita Yatsenko
68	FW	RUS	Daniil Zaplakhov
78	DF	RUS	Igor Diveyev (on loan to CSKA Moscow)
79	MF	RUS	Yevgeni Bazhanov
81	DF	RUS	Anton Ladygin
88	GK	RUS	Giorgi Shelia (to Tambov)
—	FW	RUS	Islamnur Abdulavov (to Tom Tomsk, previously on loan to Rotor Volgograd)

=== Ural Yekaterinburg ===
In: Note: Flags indicate national team as defined under FIFA eligibility rules; some limited exceptions apply. Players may hold more than one non-FIFA nationality.

No.	Pos.	Nation	Player
2	DF	RUS	Shamsiddin Shanbiyev (free agent)
8	DF	NOR	Stefan Strandberg (on loan from Krasnodar)
19	DF	BLR	Dzyanis Palyakow (from (Belarus) BATE Borisov)
36	DF	RUS	Ivan Lyubukhin
47	MF	RUS	Aleksei Bulka
51	MF	RUS	Aleksandr Volchkov
52	FW	RUS	Igor Voronin
80	MF	RUS	Chingiz Magomadov (from Akhmat Grozny)
82	FW	RUS	Sergei Arkhipovsky
84	MF	RUS	Danila Kushtin
94	MF	RUS	Anatoli Katrich (from Krasnodar)

Out: Note: Flags indicate national team as defined under FIFA eligibility rules; some limited exceptions apply. Players may hold more than one non-FIFA nationality.

No.	Pos.	Nation	Player
8	MF	RUS	Alexey Yevseyev (to Khimki)
9	MF	GEO	Giorgi Chanturia
18	DF	RUS	Dzhamaldin Khodzhaniyazov (to (Belarus) BATE Borisov)
32	MF	RUS	Nikita Glushkov (on loan to Baltika Kaliningrad)
36	DF	RUS	Aleksei Fakhrutdinov
47	FW	RUS	Konstantin Reshetnikov
51	MF	RUS	Volodya Israelyan
79	FW	RUS	Artyom Yusupov (on loan to Zenit St. Petersburg)
82	MF	RUS	Sergei Podoksyonov
84	DF	RUS	Nikita Beskrovny
96	FW	RUS	Nikolai Sidorkin

=== Yenisey Krasnoyarsk ===
In: Note: Flags indicate national team as defined under FIFA eligibility rules; some limited exceptions apply. Players may hold more than one non-FIFA nationality.

No.	Pos.	Nation	Player
9	FW	RUS	Aleksandr Sobolev (on loan from Krylia Sovetov Samara)
17	MF	RUS	Konstantin Savichev (from Anzhi Makhachkala)
23	MF	SEN	Babacar Sarr (from (Norway) Molde)
45	DF	RUS	Ivan Shalonikov (from Lada-Tolyatti)
78	MF	RUS	Arsen Khubulov (from (Turkey) BB Erzurumspor)
94	DF	UKR	Oleh Danchenko (on loan from (Ukraine) Shakhtar Donetsk)
95	GK	RUS	Maksim Yedapin (on loan from CSKA Moscow)
—	FW	RUS	Stanislav Matyash (end of loan to Tyumen)

Out: Note: Flags indicate national team as defined under FIFA eligibility rules; some limited exceptions apply. Players may hold more than one non-FIFA nationality.

No.	Pos.	Nation	Player
4	DF	RUS	Shamil Gasanov (on loan to Baltika Kaliningrad)
9	FW	AUT	Darko Bodul (to (Belarus) Shakhtyor Soligorsk)
15	MF	RUS	Azim Fatullayev (on loan to Rotor Volgograd)
16	GK	RUS	Ruslan Yunusov (to Chita)
19	FW	RUS	Igor Abramov (to Dynamo Barnaul)
26	DF	SRB	Rade Dugalić (to (Kazakhstan) Kairat)
47	GK	RUS	Mikhail Filippov (on loan to Rotor Volgograd)
70	MF	ALB	Enis Gavazaj (end of loan from (Albania) Skënderbeu Korçë)
76	MF	RUS	Timur Farrakhov (to Arsenal Tula)
91	FW	MNE	Marko Obradović (to (Belarus) Torpedo-BelAZ Zhodino)
—	DF	RUS	Dmitri Tikhiy (to Khimki, previously from Tom Tomsk)
—	MF	RUS	Artur Maloyan (to Urozhay Krasnodar, previously on loan to Tyumen)

=== Zenit Saint Petersburg ===
In: Note: Flags indicate national team as defined under FIFA eligibility rules; some limited exceptions apply. Players may hold more than one non-FIFA nationality.

No.	Pos.	Nation	Player
7	FW	IRN	Sardar Azmoun (from Rubin Kazan)
24	MF	ARG	Emiliano Rigoni (end of loan to (Italy) Atalanta)
25	MF	COL	Wílmar Barrios (from (Argentina) Boca Juniors)
32	GK	RUS	Aleksei Gorodovoy (on loan from Rubin Kazan)
34	FW	RUS	Artyom Yusupov (on loan from Ural Yekaterinburg)
36	MF	RUS	Andrei Mostovoy (from Khimki)
39	DF	RUS	Ivan Maklakov (from CSKA Moscow)
44	DF	UKR	Yaroslav Rakitskiy (from (Ukraine) Shakhtar Donetsk)
46	FW	RUS	Nikita Simdyankin
47	FW	RUS	Beka Dzhanelidze
51	FW	RUS	Daniil Makeyev
54	DF	RUS	Saba Sazonov
64	MF	RUS	Kirill Kravtsov
71	MF	RUS	Danila Buranov (from Strogino Moscow)
75	FW	RUS	Mikhail Markin (from Mordovia Saransk)
77	DF	RUS	Artyom Vyatkin (end of loan to (Finland) Lahti)
83	FW	RUS	Aleksandr Korotkov
92	FW	RUS	Daniil Shamkin (own academy)
94	DF	RUS	Danila Khotulyov

Out: Note: Flags indicate national team as defined under FIFA eligibility rules; some limited exceptions apply. Players may hold more than one non-FIFA nationality.

No.	Pos.	Nation	Player
1	GK	RUS	Yuri Lodygin (on loan to (Greece) Olympiacos)
5	MF	ARG	Leandro Paredes (to (France) Paris Saint-Germain)
23	DF	SVN	Miha Mevlja (on loan to Rostov)
28	DF	RUS	Yevgeni Chernov (to Rostov)
32	FW	RUS	Nikolai Prudnikov (on loan to Chertanovo Moscow)
39	DF	RUS	Vasili Zapryagayev (to Tom Tomsk)
47	MF	RUS	Ruslan Kazakov (to Leningradets Leningrad Oblast)
54	DF	RUS	Nikita Kakkoyev (to Tom Tomsk)
75	MF	RUS	Ivan Andreyev (to Tom Tomsk)
79	DF	RUS	Daniil Penchikov (to Tom Tomsk)
81	MF	LVA	Vladislavs Soloveičiks
82	FW	RUS	Ivan Tarasov (on loan to (Finland) HJK)
94	FW	RUS	Artur Mulyukov (to Zvezda-2 St. Petersburg)
—	DF	RUS	Maksim Karpov (to Krylia Sovetov Samara, previously on loan to Rotor Volgograd)
—	DF	RUS	Ivan Novoseltsev (on loan to Rostov, previously on loan to Anzhi Makhachkala)
—	DF	RUS	Sergei Zuykov (on loan to Tambov, previously on loan to Tom Tomsk)
