= 2018–19 FC Anzhi Makhachkala season =

Anzhi Makhachkala
2018–19 season
- Manager: Magomed Adiyev
- Stadium: Anzhi-Arena
- Russian Premier League: 15th
- Russian Cup: Round of 16 (vs. Spartak Moscow)
- Top goalscorer: League: Andrés Ponce (5); All: Andrés Ponce (5)
- Highest home attendance: 9,255 (vs CSKA Moscow, 19 October 2018)
- Lowest home attendance: 1,655 (vs Ufa, 1 December 2018)
Home colours	Away colours	Third colours

The 2018–19 FC Anzhi Makhachkala season was the club's fourth season back in the Russian Premier League, the highest tier of football in Russia, since their relegation at the end of the 2013–14 season. Anzhi finished the season 15th in the league, being relegated back to the Russian Football National League, whilst they were knocked out of the Russian Cup at the Round of 16 stage by Spartak Moscow.

== Season events ==
With manager Vadim Skripchenko's contract expiring at the end of the 2017–18 season, was replaced by Magomed Adiyev on 4 June 2018

Anzhi Makhachkala were initially relegated at the end of the 2017–18 season, but FC Amkar Perm announced on 13 June that the Russian Football Union had recalled their 2018–19 license, making them ineligible for the Russian Premier League or Russian Football National League. Anzhi then re-applied for their Premier League membership on 15 June, with their admission to the 2018–19 Russian Premier League being confirmed on 22 June.

On 10 May 2019, following a 0-1 defeat to Arsenal Tula, their relegation back to the Russian Football National League was confirmed.

== Squad ==
As of match played 26 May 2019

No.	Name	Nationality	Position	Date of birth (age)	Signed from	Signed in	Contract ends	Apps.	Goals
Goalkeepers
1	Aleksandr Budakov	(Russia)	GK	10 February 1985 (aged 34)	Amkar Perm	2017		13	0
22	Yuri Dyupin	(Russia)	GK	17 March 1988 (aged 31)	Kuban Krasnodar	2018		31	0
Defenders
3	Igor Udaly	(Russia)	DF	8 December 1984 (aged 34)	SKA-Khabarovsk	2017		27	0
4	Anton Belov	(Russia)	DF	2 May 1996 (aged 23)	Sokol Saratov	2015		6	0
21	Dmitri Belorukov	(Russia)	DF	24 March 1983 (aged 36)	Dynamo Moscow	2018		9	0
25	Magomed Elmurzayev	(Russia)	DF	16 June 1997 (aged 21)	Youth Team	2015		8	0
28	Pavel Kaloshin	(Russia)	DF	13 March 1998 (aged 21)	Tosno	2018		12	0
30	Yevgeny Gapon	(Russia)	DF	20 April 1991 (aged 28)	Kuban Krasnodar	2018		18	0
50	Nikita Chistyakov	(Russia)	DF	8 August 2000 (aged 18)	Youth Team	2018		3	0
55	Alikadi Saidov	(Russia)	DF	2 April 1999 (aged 20)	Youth Team	2018		1	0
Midfielders
5	Vladislav Kulik	(Russia)	MF	17 March 1988 (aged 31)	Krylia Sovetov	2018		25	3
8	Shakhban Gaydarov	(Russia)	MF	21 January 1997 (aged 22)	Academy	2015		7	0
10	Adlan Katsayev	(Russia)	MF	20 February 1988 (aged 31)	Akhmat Grozny	2018		45	2
13	Roland Gigolayev	(Russia)	MF	4 January 1990 (aged 29)	loan from Akhmat Grozny	2018		27	0
23	Nikita Andreyev	(Russia)	MF	2 November 1997 (aged 21)	Zenit St.Petersburg	2018		1	0
29	Gaël Ondoua	(Cameroon)	MF	4 November 1995 (aged 23)		2018		27	0
97	Magomed Magomedov	(Russia)	MF	21 January 1997 (aged 22)	Academy	2015		2	0
99	Kamil Zakirov	(Russia)	MF	15 November 1998 (aged 20)	Academy	2016		12	1
Forwards
6	Ivan Markelov	(Russia)	FW	17 April 1988 (aged 31)	Dynamo Moscow	2017		42	4
7	Juan Lescano	(Argentina)	FW	29 October 1992 (aged 26)	SKA-Khabarovsk	2017	2020	23	5
9	Andrés Ponce	(Venezuela)	FW	11 November 1996 (aged 22)	Sampdoria	2018		28	5
14	Gamid Agalarov	(Russia)	FW	16 July 2000 (aged 18)	Academy	2018		7	0
17	Ivan Ivanchenko	(Russia)	FW	7 September 1998 (aged 20)	Zenit-2 St.Petersburg	2017		11	0
18	Apti Akhyadov	(Russia)	FW	24 August 1993 (aged 25)	loan from Akhmat Grozny	2018	2019	23	0
19	Pavel Dolgov	(Russia)	FW	16 August 1996 (aged 22)	Zenit St.Petersburg	2017		35	2
Out on loan
27	Amir Mokhammad	(Russia)	MF	23 February 1996 (aged 23)	Legion-Dynamo Makhachkala	2018		7	0
	Magomed Musalov	(Russia)	DF	9 February 1994 (aged 25)	LFK Rubin Kazan	2012		57	1
	Pavel Karasyov	(Russia)	MF	13 December 1990 (aged 28)	SKA-Khabarovsk	2017		4	0
	Dzhamal Dibirgadzhiyev	(Russia)	FW	2 August 1996 (aged 22)	Academy	2014		4	1
	Amur Kalmykov	(Russia)	FW	29 May 1994 (aged 24)	Afips Afipsky	2018		7	1
Players who left during the season
2	Guram Tetrashvili	(Russia)	DF	2 August 1988 (aged 30)	Tosno	2017		39	0
4	Jhon Chancellor	(Venezuela)	DF	2 January 1992 (aged 27)	Delfín	2018	2020	17	1
7	Dostonbek Khamdamov	(Uzbekistan)	MF	24 July 1996 (aged 22)	Bunyodkor	2018	2019	11	0
8	Paul Anton	(Romania)	MF	10 May 1991 (aged 28)	Dinamo București	2018	2020	13	3
15	Danil Glebov	(Russia)	MF	3 November 1999 (aged 19)	Academy	2018		10	0
16	Vladimir Sugrobov	(Russia)	GK	10 September 1996 (aged 22)	Ararat Moscow	2018		2	0
17	Ihor Chaykovskyi	(Ukraine)	MF	7 October 1991 (aged 27)	Zorya Luhansk	2017		15	0
20	Mohammed Rabiu	(Ghana)	MF	31 December 1989 (aged 29)		2018		12	0
24	Konstantin Savichev	(Russia)	MF	6 March 1994 (aged 25)	SKA-Khabarovsk	2018		15	0
25	Ivan Novoseltsev	(Russia)	DF	25 August 1991 (aged 27)	loan from Zenit St.Petersburg	2018	2019	12	1

=== Out on loan ===
Note: Flags indicate national team as defined under FIFA eligibility rules; some limited exceptions apply. Players may hold more than one non-FIFA nationality.

No.	Pos.	Nation	Player
—	DF	RUS	Magomed Musalov (at Akhmat Grozny)
—	MF	RUS	Pavel Karasyov (at SKA-Khabarovsk)
—	MF	RUS	Amir Mokhammad (at Legion Dynamo Makhachkala)

No.	Pos.	Nation	Player
—	FW	RUS	Dzhamal Dibirgadzhiyev (at Urozhay Krasnodar)
—	FW	RUS	Amur Kalmykov (at Urozhay Krasnodar)

== Transfers ==
=== In ===
Date	Position	Nationality	Name	From	Fee	Ref.
12 July 2018	GK	(Russia)	Yuri Dyupin	Kuban Krasnodar	Undisclosed	
12 July 2018	MF	(Russia)	Adlan Katsayev	Akhmat Grozny	Undisclosed	
12 July 2018	MF	(Russia)	Vladislav Kulik	Krylia Sovetov Samara	Undisclosed	
12 July 2018	MF	(Russia)	Konstantin Savichev	SKA-Khabarovsk	Undisclosed	
21 July 2018	DF	(Russia)	Dmitri Belorukov	Dynamo Moscow	Undisclosed	
21 July 2018	MF	(Ghana)	Mohammed Rabiu		Free	
25 July 2018	MF	(Russia)	Amir Mokhammad	Legion-Dynamo Makhachkala	Undisclosed	
27 July 2018	MF	(Cameroon)	Gaël Ondoua		Free	
27 July 2018	FW	(Venezuela)	Andrés Ponce	Sampdoria	Undisclosed	
27 November 2018	FW	(Georgia (country))	Nikoloz Kutateladze	Paris Saint-Germain U17	Undisclosed	

=== Out ===
Date	Position	Nationality	Name	To	Fee	Ref.
20 June 2018	DF	(Russia)	Vladimir Poluyakhtov	Krylia Sovetov	Undisclosed	
26 June 2018	MF	(Ghana)	Kwadwo Poku	Tampa Bay Rowdies	Undisclosed	
10 July 2018	MF	(Russia)	Arsen Khubulov	BB Erzurumspor	Undisclosed	
17 August 2018	DF	(Slovenia)	Miral Samardžić	Krylia Sovetov	Undisclosed	
21 August 2018	MF	(Romania)	Paul Anton	Krylia Sovetov	Undisclosed	
	DF	(Russia)	Anton Belov	Zorky Krasnogorsk	Undisclosed	
13 January 2019	MF	(Russia)	Danil Glebov	Rostov	Undisclosed	
22 January 2019	MF	(Ukraine)	Ihor Chaykovskyi	Zorya Luhansk	Undisclosed	
24 January 2019	MF	(Russia)	Konstantin Savichev	Yenisey Krasnoyarsk	Undisclosed	
10 February 2019	GK	(Russia)	Vladimir Sugrobov	Baltika Kaliningrad	Undisclosed	
14 February 2019	DF	(Venezuela)	Jhon Chancellor	Al Ahli	Undisclosed	
15 February 2019	MF	(Uzbekistan)	Dostonbek Khamdamov	Pakhtakor Tashkent	Undisclosed	
23 February 2019	MF	(Ghana)	Mohammed Rabiu	Krylia Sovetov	Undisclosed	

=== Loans in ===
Date from	Position	Nationality	Name	From	Date to	Ref.
23 July 2018	MF	(Russia)	Roland Gigolayev	Akhmat Grozny	End of Season	
26 July 2018	FW	(Russia)	Apti Akhyadov	Akhmat Grozny	End of Season	
27 July 2018	DF	(Russia)	Ivan Novoseltsev	Zenit St.Petersburg	January 2019	

=== Loans out ===
Date from	Position	Nationality	Name	To	Date to	Ref.
15 June 2018	DF	(Russia)	Magomed Musalov	Akhmat Grozny	End of Season	
13 July 2018	MF	(Russia)	Pavel Karasyov	SKA-Khabarovsk	End of Season	
17 July 2018	FW	(Argentina)	Juan Lescano	Tobol	January 2019	
26 July 2018	FW	(Russia)	Amur Kalmykov	Urozhay Krasnodar	End of Season	
	DF	(Russia)	Anton Belov	Zorky Krasnogorsk	January 2019	
	MF	(Russia)	Shakhban Gaydarov	Legion Dynamo Makhachkala	January 2019	
	MF	(Russia)	Magomed Magomedov	Legion Dynamo Makhachkala	January 2019	
14 February 2019	MF	(Russia)	Amir Mokhammad	Legion-Dynamo Makhachkala	End of Season	

=== Released ===
Date	Position	Nationality	Name	Joined	Date
2 July 2018	DF	(Russia)	Sergei Bryzgalov	Ural Yekaterinburg	
2 July 2018	FW	(Russia)	Pavel Yakovlev	Krylia Sovetov Samara	
2 July 2018	MF	(Russia)	Mikhail Bakayev	Orenburg	
26 July 2018	MF	(Russia)	Islam Zhilov	Urozhay Krasnodar	
24 November 2018	DF	(Russia)	Guram Tetrashvili	Gomel	9 March 2019
	DF	(Moldova)	Igor Armaș	Voluntari	
	DF	(Slovenia)	Miral Samardžić	Krylia Sovetov	19 August 2018
	DF	(Russia)	Magomed Elmurzayev		
	MF	(Russia)	Anvar Gazimagomedov	Legion Dynamo Makhachkala	
	FW	(Russia)	Aleksandr Prudnikov	Spartaks Jūrmala	
	FW	(Russia)	Aleksandr Bataev		

== Friendlies ==
29 June 2018	Anzhi Makhachkala	2 – 2	Chayka Peschanokopskoye	Kislovodsk
11:00 MSK (UTC+3)	Trialist 64'; Tetrashvili 69'	Report	Gurtsev 15' (pen.); Khokhlachyov 34'

3 July 2018	Anzhi Makhachkala	4 – 1	Spartak Nalchik	Kislovodsk
17:30 MSK (UTC+3)	Gigolayev 8'; Akhyadov 30' (pen.); Kalmykov 69'; Lescano 88'	Report	Shavayev 26'

16 July 2018	Yenisey Krasnoyarsk	4 – 0	Anzhi Makhachkala	Kratovo
17:00 MSK (UTC+3)	Dugalić 16'; Komolov 39', 89'; Kostyukov 68'	Report

22 July 2018	Arsenal Tula	0 – 0	Anzhi Makhachkala	Tula
MSK (UTC+3)		Report	Rabiu (yellow card) 70'; Agalarov (yellow card) 82'	Stadium: Arsenal Stadium; Attendance: 2,900; Referee: Vladimir Seldyakov

21 January 2019	Anzhi Makhachkala	3 – 0	Akhmat Grozny Youth	Kislovodsk
MSK (UTC+3)	G.Agalarov 5', 13', 40'	Report

25 January 2019	Anzhi Makhachkala	3 – 0	Akhmat Grozny Youth	Kislovodsk
MSK (UTC+3)	G.Agalarov 19'; Ponce 60', 80'	Report

6 February 2019	Anzhi Makhachkala	5 – 0	Dynamo Stavropol	Kislovodsk
MSK (UTC+3)	Kaloshin 13'; Ponce 48', 81'; Chistyakov 49'; Dolgov 83'	Report

9 February 2019	Anzhi Makhachkala	4 – 4	Spartak Vladikavkaz	Kislovodsk
MSK (UTC+3)	Katsayev 32'; Ivanchenko 35'; Akhyadov 53'; Kuchiyev 82'	Report	Goal

14 February 2019	Anzhi Makhachkala	3 – 0	Angusht Nazran	Kislovodsk
MSK (UTC+3)	Akhyadov 13'; Lescano 27'; Kulik 42'	Report

21 February 2019	Anzhi Makhachkala	4 – 1	Spartak Nalchik	Kislovodsk
MSK (UTC+3)	Dolgov 3'; Ponce 24'; P.Kaloshin 55'; Andreyev 88'	Report	Goal

== Competitions ==
=== Russian Premier League ===
==== Results by round ====
Round	1	2	3	4	5	6	7	8	9	10	11	12	13	14	15	16	17	18	19	20	21	22	23	24	25	26	27	28	29	30
Ground	A	A	A	H	A	A	H	A	H	A	H	A	H	A	H	H	H	A	H	H	A	H	A	H	A	H	A	H	A	H
Result	W	L	L	L	L	L	L	W	W	D	L	L	W	L	D	D	L	W	L	L	L	D	L	L	L	D	L	L	D	L
Position	3	9	11	14	16	16	16	14	12	13	15	15	14	15	15	14	15	14	14	14	14	15	15	15	15	15	15	15	15	15

Updated to match(es) played on 26 May 2019. Source: See Results
A = Away; H = Home; W = Win; D = Draw; L = Loss

==== Results ====
28 July 2018 1	Ural Yekaterinburg	0 – 1	Anzhi Makhachkala	Yekaterinburg
16:30 MSK (UTC+3)	Dinga (yellow card) 90+3'	Report	Gigolayev (yellow card) 24'; Tetrashvili (yellow card) 41'; Rabiu (yellow card) 52'; Markelov (yellow card) 72'; Anton 83'	Stadium: Central Stadium; Attendance: 15,194; Referee: Sergey Ivanov

6 August 2018 2	Ufa	3 – 0	Anzhi Makhachkala	Ufa
17:30 MSK (UTC+3)	Igboun 3'; Vaněk 87', 89'	Report	Belorukov (yellow card) 38'	Stadium: Neftyanik Stadium; Attendance: 5,612; Referee: Sergei Karasev

11 August 2018 3	Spartak Moscow	1 – 0	Anzhi Makhachkala	Moscow
19:00 MSK (UTC+3)	Zé Luís 70'	Report	Rabiu (yellow card) 25'; Belorukov (yellow card) 45+2' (yellow-red card) 68'; Ponce (red card) 49'; Chaykovskyi (yellow card) 52'; Gapon (yellow card) 90+2'	Stadium: Otkritie Arena; Attendance: 27,856; Referee: Kirill Levnikov

17 August 2018 4	Anzhi Makhachkala	1 – 3	Orenburg	Kaspiysk
19:30 MSK (UTC+3)	Novoseltsev 12' (yellow card) 68'; Markelov (penalty missed) 41' (yellow card) 54'; Udaly (yellow card) 60'; Rabiu (yellow card) 72'	Report	Chirkin (yellow card) 8'; Begić (yellow card) 40'; Popović 69' (pen.); Sivakow (yellow card) 71'; Sutormin 77'; Chukanov 83'	Stadium: Anzhi Arena; Attendance: 6,253; Referee: Aleksey Eskov

26 August 2018 5	Lokomotiv Moscow	2 – 1	Anzhi Makhachkala	Moscow
19:00 MSK (UTC+3)	Rybus 55'; Fernandes (yellow card) 65'; Farfán (yellow card) 67'; Smolov 73'	Report	Belorukov (yellow card) 38'; Gapon (yellow card) 49'; Chaykovskyi (yellow card) 66'; Markelov (yellow card) 67'; Ondoua (yellow card) 69'; Kulik 90+3' (pen.)	Stadium: RZD Arena; Attendance: 15,245; Referee: Vasiliy Kazartsev

1 September 2018 6	Krylia Sovetov	1 – 0	Anzhi Makhachkala	Samara
14:00 MSK (UTC+3)	Chicherin (yellow card) 26'; Kornilenko 83'	Report		Stadium: Samara Arena; Attendance: 19,519; Referee: Roman Galimov

16 September 2018 7	Anzhi Makhachkala	0 – 4	Krasnodar	Kaspiysk
16:30 MSK (UTC+3)	Khamdamov (yellow card) 54'; Belorukov (yellow card) 70'; Savichev (yellow card) 78'	Report	Wanderson 9'; Claesson 16'; Mamayev 58'; Ignatyev 82'; Suleymanov (yellow card) 87'	Stadium: Anzhi Arena; Attendance: 4,270; Referee: Sergey Ivanov

22 September 2018 8	Dynamo Moscow	0 – 1	Anzhi Makhachkala	Khimki
14:00 MSK (UTC+3)	Lutsenko (penalty missed) 90+1	Report	Chaykovskyi (yellow card) 15'; Ponce 49'; Novoseltsev (yellow card) 59'; Dyupin (yellow card) 88'	Stadium: Arena Khimki; Attendance: 6,472; Referee: Vladislav Bezborodov

30 September 2018 9	Anzhi Makhachkala	2 – 1	Zenit St.Petersburg	Kaspiysk
14:00 MSK (UTC+3)	Savichev (yellow card) 5'; Chaykovskyi (yellow card) 59'; Udaly (yellow card) 60'; Ponce 71' (yellow card) 72'; Belorukov (red card) 76'; Kulik 83' (pen.); Dyupin (yellow card) 90+4'	Report	Paredes (yellow card) 9'; Marchisio 47'; Smolnikov (yellow card) 82'	Stadium: Anzhi Arena; Attendance: 6,350; Referee: Aleksei Matyunin

7 October 2018 10	Akhmat Grozny	0 – 0	Anzhi Makhachkala	Grozny
14:00 MSK (UTC+3)	Gashchenkov (yellow card) 21'; Berisha (yellow card) 55'; Mohammadi (yellow card) 64'	Report	Novoseltsev (yellow card) 9'; Ondoua (yellow card) 45+1'; Rabiu (yellow card) 58'; Ponce (yellow card) 68'; Glebov (yellow card) 73'	Stadium: Akhmat-Arena; Attendance: 30,597; Referee: Nikolay Voloshin

19 October 2018 11	Anzhi Makhachkala	0 – 2	CSKA Moscow	Kaspiysk
18:00 MSK (UTC+3)	Dolgov (yellow card) 17'; Gigolayev (yellow card) 39'; Glebov (yellow card) 60'; Ondoua (yellow card) 72'; Kulik (yellow card) 78'; Chaykovskyi (yellow card) 79'	Report	Vlašić 31'; Becão (yellow card) 36'; Chalov 71'	Stadium: Anzhi Arena; Attendance: 9,255; Referee: Vasiliy Kazartsev

27 October 2018 12	Rostov	1 – 0	Anzhi Makhachkala	Rostov-on-Don
19:00 MSK (UTC+3)	Skopintsev (yellow card) 16' (yellow-red card) 53'; Guliyev (yellow card) 25'; Sigurðarson 37'	Report	Chaykovskyi (yellow card) 56'; Chancellor (yellow card) 64'; Savichev (yellow card) 67'; Rabiu (yellow card) 89'	Stadium: Rostov Arena; Attendance: 31,267; Referee: Sergei Karasev

5 November 2018 13	Anzhi Makhachkala	2 – 1	Yenisey Krasnoyarsk	Kaspiysk
19:00 MSK (UTC+3)	Udaly (yellow card) 19'; Ponce 35' (pen.), 57' (pen.); Chancellor (yellow card) 65'; Glebov (yellow card) 78'	Report	Komkov (yellow card) 34'; Sarkisov 53'; Obradović (yellow card) 73'; Zotov (yellow card) 88'; Yurchenko (yellow card) 90+1'	Stadium: Anzhi Arena; Attendance: 3,050; Referee: Aleksei Matyunin

9 November 2018 14	Arsenal Tula	2 – 0	Anzhi Makhachkala	Tula
19:30 MSK (UTC+3)	Tkachev 25'; Bakaev 63'; Levashov (yellow card) 90'	Report	Chancellor (yellow card) 77'; Glebov (yellow card) 78'; Khamdamov (yellow card) 88'	Stadium: Arsenal Stadium; Attendance: 7,869; Referee: Vasiliy Kazartsev

24 November 2018 15	Anzhi Makhachkala	1 – 1	Rubin Kazan	Kaspiysk
16:00 MSK (UTC+3)	Chaykovskiy (yellow card) 23'; Dolgov 36'; Ponce (yellow card) 76'	Report	Kalinin 27'; Kambolov (yellow card) 49'; Tsallagov (yellow card) 70'; Navas (yellow card) 76'	Stadium: Anzhi Arena; Attendance: 3,620; Referee: Sergey Ivanov

1 December 2018 16	Anzhi Makhachkala	0 – 0	Ufa	Kaspiysk
19:00 MSK (UTC+3)	Chaykovskiy (yellow card) 48'; Dolgov (yellow card) 49'; Kulik (penalty missed) 77'	Report	Carp (yellow card) 49'; Tabidze (yellow card) 69'; Bizjak (yellow card) 78'; Nikitin (yellow card) 84'	Stadium: Anzhi Arena; Attendance: 1,655; Referee: Mikhail Vilkov

8 December 2018 17	Anzhi Makhachkala	0 – 3	Spartak Moscow	Kaspiysk
20:00 MSK (UTC+3)	Gigolayev (yellow card) 14' (yellow-red card) 54'; Glebov (yellow card) 78'	Report	Zé Luís 45+1' (pen.), 84'; Luiz Adriano 55' (pen.); Popov (yellow card) 61'; Kutepov (yellow card) 78'	Stadium: Anzhi Arena; Attendance: 4,280; Referee: Vladislav Bezborodov

1 March 2019 18	Orenburg	0 – 1	Anzhi Makhachkala	Orenburg
16:30 MSK (UTC+3)	Begić (yellow card) 34'; Sivakow (yellow card) 39' (yellow-red card) 56'; Sutormin (yellow card) 53'	Report	Markelov (yellow card) 32'; Kulik 58'; Katsayev (yellow card) 69'; Dyupin (yellow card) 86'	Stadium: Gazovik Stadium; Attendance: 2,453; Referee: Vasiliy Kazartsev

10 March 2019 19	Anzhi Makhachkala	0 – 2	Lokomotiv Moscow	Kaspiysk
21:00 MSK (UTC+3)	Gapon (yellow card) 27'; Zakirov (yellow card) 69'	Report	Farfán 21'; An.Miranchuk (yellow card) 29'; Smolov 80'	Stadium: Anzhi Arena; Attendance: 4,860; Referee: Nikolay Voloshin

15 March 2019 20	Anzhi Makhachkala	0 – 2	Krylia Sovetov	Kaspiysk
19:30 MSK (UTC+3)	Zakirov (yellow card) 33'; Ivanchenko (yellow card) 79' (yellow-red card) 90+3'; Gapon (yellow card) 87'	Report	Kanunnikov 28'; Shishkin (yellow card) 40'; Poluyakhtov (yellow card) 43'; Burlak (yellow card) 66'; Samardžić (yellow card) 76'; Rabiu (yellow card) 85'; Sheydayev 88' (pen.)	Stadium: Anzhi Arena; Attendance: 3,120; Referee: Kirill Levnikov

31 March 2019 21	Krasnodar	5 – 0	Anzhi Makhachkala	Krasnodar
19:00 MSK (UTC+3)	Wanderson 18'; Petrov (yellow card) 30'; Claesson 38' (pen.); Suleymanov 55', 70'; Ignatyev 67'	Report	Belov (yellow card) 42'; Zakirov (yellow card) 87'	Stadium: Krasnodar Stadium; Attendance: 23,256; Referee: Vladislav Bezborodov

6 April 2019 22	Anzhi Makhachkala	1 – 1	Dynamo Moscow	Kaspiysk
14:00 MSK (UTC+3)	Ponce 16'; Akhyadov (yellow card) 90+2'; Katsayev (yellow card) 90+4'	Report	Tetteh (yellow card) 10' (yellow-red card) 90+4'; Morozov (yellow card) 35'; Šunjić 73'	Stadium: Anzhi Arena; Attendance: 2,575; Referee: Vasiliy Kazartsev

14 April 2019 23	Zenit St.Petersburg	5 – 0	Anzhi Makhachkala	Saint Petersburg
16:30 MSK (UTC+3)	Azmoun 2'; Ivanović 9'; Rigoni 83'; Driussi 88', 89'	Report	Ondoua (yellow card) 79'	Stadium: Krestovsky Stadium; Attendance: 44,701; Referee: Mikhail Vilkov

19 April 2019 24	Anzhi Makhachkala	0 – 1	Akhmat Grozny	Kaspiysk
19:30 MSK (UTC+3)	Kulik (yellow card) 49'; Dolgov (yellow card) 67'	Report	Ivanov 77'; Semyonov (yellow card) 84'	Stadium: Anzhi Arena; Attendance: 1,950; Referee: Vitali Meshkov

24 April 2019 25	CSKA Moscow	2 – 0	Anzhi Makhachkala	Moscow
19:30 MSK (UTC+3)	Bijol 13'; Akhmetov (yellow card) 36'; Sigurðsson 55'	Report	Gapon (yellow card) 10'; Udaly (yellow card) 84'	Stadium: VEB Arena; Attendance: 12,712; Referee: Vladimir Moskalyov

27 April 2019 26	Anzhi Makhachkala	1 – 1	Rostov	Kaspiysk
16:30 MSK (UTC+3)	Zakirov 77'; Elmurzayev (yellow card) 84'	Report	Eremenko 35'; Aleksandr Zuyev (yellow card) 55'	Stadium: Anzhi Arena; Attendance: 2,480; Referee: Sergei Karasev

3 May 2019 27	Yenisey Krasnoyarsk	3 – 1	Anzhi Makhachkala	Krasnoyarsk
14:00 MSK (UTC+3)	Torbinski (yellow card) 8'; Komkov (yellow card) 26'; Sobolev 63', 66'; Ogude 82'	Report	Gapon (yellow card) 4'; Ponce (yellow card) 12'; Gigolayev (yellow card) 28' (yellow-red card) 58'; Dolgov 35'; Akhyadov (yellow card) 39'; Ondoua (yellow card) 79'	Stadium: Central Stadium; Attendance: 7,418; Referee: Pavel Kukuyan

10 May 2019 28	Anzhi Makhachkala	0 – 1	Arsenal Tula	Kaspiysk
16:30 MSK (UTC+3)	Kaloshin (yellow card) 60'; Ivanchenko (yellow card) 90'	Report	Bakayev 34' (pen.); Kostadinov (yellow card) 70'; Ožegović (yellow card) 89'	Stadium: Anzhi Arena; Attendance: 2,530; Referee: Sergey Lapochkin

20 May 2019 29	Rubin Kazan	0 – 0	Anzhi Makhachkala	Kazan
19:00 MSK (UTC+3)	Uremović (yellow card) 90+4'	Report	Kaloshin (yellow card) 84'	Stadium: Kazan Arena; Attendance: 5,405; Referee: Sergei Karasev

26 May 2019 30	Anzhi Makhachkala	0 – 2	Ural Yekaterinburg	Kaspiysk
14:00 MSK (UTC+3)	Magomedov (yellow card) 78'	Report	Boumal (yellow card) 15'; Pogrebnyak 56'; Bryzgalov 59'	Stadium: Anzhi Arena; Attendance: 2,250; Referee: Evgeny Turbin

==== League table ====
Pos	Team	Pld	W	D	L	GF	GA	GD	Pts	Qualification or relegation
12	Dynamo Moscow	30	6	15	9	28	28	0	33	
13	Krylia Sovetov Samara (O)	30	8	4	18	25	46	−21	28	Qualification for the Relegation play-offs
14	Ufa (O)	30	5	11	14	24	34	−10	26	Qualification for the Relegation play-offs
15	Anzhi Makhachkala (R)	30	5	6	19	13	50	−37	21	Relegation to Football National League
16	Yenisey Krasnoyarsk (R)	30	4	8	18	24	55	−31	20	Relegation to Football National League

Updated to match(es) played on 26 May 2019. Source: Russian Premier League, Soccerway
Rules for classification: 1) Points; 2) Head-to-head points; 3) Head-to-head matches won; 4) Head-to-head goal difference; 5) Head-to-head goals scored; 6) Head-to-head away goals; 7) Matches won; 8) Goal difference; 9) Goals scored; 10) Away goals scored; 11) Play-off.
(O) Play-off winner; (R) Relegated

=== Russian Cup ===
26 September 2018 Round of 32	Chayka Peschanokopskoye	1 – 2	Anzhi Makhachkala	Peschanokopskoye
19:00 MSK (UTC+3)	Khokhlachyov 57'	Report	Glebov (yellow card) 8'; Dolgov (yellow card) 33' (goal) 41'; Markelov (yellow card) 69'; Khamdamov (yellow card) 75'; Chancellor 84'	Stadium: Central Stadium; Attendance: 1,980; Referee: Vladimir Seldyakov

1 November 2018 Round of 16	Spartak Moscow	1 – 0	Anzhi Makhachkala	Moscow
20:00 MSK (UTC+3)	Hanni 20'; Timofeyev (yellow card) 87'; Kutepov (yellow card) 90+2'	Report	Chancellor (yellow card) 40'; Khamdamov (yellow card) 90+1'	Stadium: Otkritie Arena; Attendance: 15,848; Referee: Nikolay Voloshin

== Squad statistics ==
As of match played 26 May 2019

=== Appearances and goals ===
No.	Pos	Nat	Player	Total		Premier League		Russian Cup	
No.	Pos	Nat	Player	Apps	Goals	Apps	Goals	Apps	Goals
1	GK	(Russia) RUS	Aleksandr Budakov	1	0	0	0	1	0
3	DF	(Russia) RUS	Igor Udaly	27	0	23+2	0	2	0
4	DF	(Russia) RUS	Anton Belov	6	0	6	0	0	0
5	MF	(Russia) RUS	Vladislav Kulik	25	3	24	3	1	0
6	FW	(Russia) RUS	Ivan Markelov	16	0	3+12	0	0+1	0
7	FW	(Argentina) ARG	Juan Lescano	4	0	0+4	0	0	0
8	MF	(Russia) RUS	Shakhban Gaydarov	7	0	6+1	0	0	0
9	FW	(Venezuela) VEN	Andrés Ponce	28	5	24+3	5	1	0
10	MF	(Russia) RUS	Adlan Katsayev	21	0	10+10	0	0+1	0
13	MF	(Russia) RUS	Roland Gigolayev	27	0	25	0	2	0
14	FW	(Russia) RUS	Gamid Agalarov	7	0	2+5	0	0	0
17	FW	(Russia) RUS	Ivan Ivanchenko	9	0	4+5	0	0	0
18	FW	(Russia) RUS	Apti Akhyadov	23	0	12+10	0	1	0
19	FW	(Russia) RUS	Pavel Dolgov	24	3	16+7	2	1	1
21	DF	(Russia) RUS	Dmitri Belorukov	9	0	9	0	0	0
22	GK	(Russia) RUS	Yury Dyupin	31	0	30	0	1	0
23	MF	(Russia) RUS	Nikita Andreyev	1	0	0+1	0	0	0
25	DF	(Russia) RUS	Magomed Elmurzayev	4	0	1+3	0	0	0
28	DF	(Russia) RUS	Pavel Kaloshin	12	0	12	0	0	0
29	MF	(Cameroon) CMR	Gaël Ondoua	27	0	19+6	0	1+1	0
30	DF	(Russia) RUS	Yevgeny Gapon	18	0	17	0	1	0
50	DF	(Russia) RUS	Nikita Chistyakov	3	0	3	0	0	0
55	DF	(Russia) RUS	Alikadi Saidov	1	0	1	0	0	0
97	MF	(Russia) RUS	Magomed Magomedov	1	0	0+1	0	0	0
99	MF	(Russia) RUS	Kamil Zakirov	13	1	11+2	1	0	0
Players away from the club on loan:
Players who left Anzhi Makhachkala during the season:
2	DF	(Russia) RUS	Guram Tetrashvili	4	0	3+1	0	0	0
4	DF	(Venezuela) VEN	Jhon Chancellor	16	1	13+1	0	2	1
7	MF	(Uzbekistan) UZB	Dostonbek Khamdamov	7	0	1+4	0	1+1	0
8	MF	(Romania) ROU	Paul Anton	2	1	0+2	1	0	0
15	MF	(Russia) RUS	Danil Glebov	10	0	6+2	0	2	0
17	MF	(Ukraine) UKR	Ihor Chaykovskyi	14	0	11+1	0	2	0
20	MF	(Ghana) GHA	Mohammed Rabiu	12	0	11	0	1	0
24	MF	(Russia) RUS	Konstantin Savichev	15	0	14	0	1	0
25	DF	(Russia) RUS	Ivan Novoseltsev	12	1	11	1	1	0
27	MF	(Russia) RUS	Amir Mokhammad	7	0	3+3	0	0+1	0

=== Goal scorers ===
Place	Position	Nation	Number	Name	Premier League	Russian Cup	Total
1	FW	(Venezuela)	9	Andrés Ponce	5	0	5
2	MF	(Russia)	5	Vladislav Kulik	3	0	3
2	FW	(Russia)	19	Pavel Dolgov	2	1	3
4	MF	(Romania)	8	Paul Anton	1	0	1
4	DF	(Russia)	25	Ivan Novoseltsev	1	0	1
4	MF	(Russia)	99	Kamil Zakirov	1	0	1
4	DF	(Venezuela)	4	Jhon Chancellor	0	1	1
				TOTALS	13	2	15

=== Disciplinary record ===
Number	Nation	Position	Name	Premier League		Russian Cup		Total	
Number	Nation	Position	Name	Yellow card	Red card	Yellow card	Red card	Yellow card	Red card
3	(Russia)	DF	Igor Udaly	4	0	0	0	4	0
4	(Russia)	DF	Anton Belov	1	0	0	0	1	0
5	(Russia)	MF	Vladislav Kulik	2	0	0	0	2	0
6	(Russia)	FW	Ivan Markelov	4	0	1	0	5	0
9	(Venezuela)	FW	Andrés Ponce	4	1	0	0	4	1
10	(Russia)	MF	Adlan Katsayev	2	0	0	0	2	0
13	(Russia)	MF	Roland Gigolayev	6	2	0	0	6	2
17	(Russia)	FW	Ivan Ivanchenko	3	1	0	0	3	1
18	(Russia)	FW	Apti Akhyadov	2	0	0	0	2	0
19	(Russia)	FW	Pavel Dolgov	4	0	1	0	5	0
21	(Russia)	DF	Dmitri Belorukov	5	2	0	0	5	2
22	(Russia)	GK	Yury Dyupin	3	0	0	0	3	0
25	(Russia)	DF	Magomed Elmurzayev	1	0	0	0	1	0
28	(Russia)	DF	Pavel Kaloshin	2	0	0	0	2	0
29	(Cameroon)	MF	Gaël Ondoua	4	0	0	0	4	0
30	(Russia)	DF	Yevgeny Gapon	6	0	0	0	6	0
97	(Russia)	MF	Magomed Magomedov	1	0	0	0	1	0
99	(Russia)	MF	Kamil Zakirov	3	0	0	0	3	0
Players who left Anzhi Makhachkala during the season:
2	(Russia)	DF	Guram Tetrashvili	1	0	0	0	1	0
4	(Venezuela)	DF	Jhon Chancellor	3	0	1	0	4	0
7	(Uzbekistan)	MF	Dostonbek Khamdamov	2	0	2	0	4	0
15	(Russia)	MF	Danil Glebov	5	0	1	0	6	0
17	(Ukraine)	MF	Ihor Chaykovskyi	8	0	0	0	8	0
20	(Ghana)	MF	Mohammed Rabiu	5	0	0	0	5	0
24	(Russia)	MF	Konstantin Savichev	3	0	0	0	3	0
25	(Russia)	DF	Ivan Novoseltsev	3	0	0	0	3	0
			TOTALS	87	6	6	0	93	6
