= Amir Mokhammad =

Russian footballer

Personal information
- Full name: Amir Khamayuni Mokhammad
- Date of birth: 23 February 1996 (age 30)
- Place of birth: Makhachkala, Russia
- Height: 1.87 m (6 ft 2 in)
- Positions: Left midfielder; left winger

Team information
- Current team: Spartak Kostroma
- Number: 96

Youth career
- –2013: RSDYuShOR-2 Makhachkala
- 2013: Anzhi Makhachkala

Senior career*
| Years | Team | Apps | (Gls) |
| 2015 | Kvazar Moscow | | |
| 2015 | Legion Makhachkala (amateur) | | |
| 2016–2018 | Legion Dynamo Makhachkala | 55 | (12) |
| 2018–2019 | Anzhi Makhachkala | 6 | (0) |
| 2019 | → Legion Dynamo Makhachkala (loan) | 7 | (0) |
| 2019–2020 | Legion Dynamo Makhachkala | 16 | (2) |
| 2020 | Krasny | 10 | (2) |
| 2021–2022 | Avangard Kursk | 35 | (6) |
| 2022–2023 | KAMAZ Naberezhnye Chelny | 32 | (3) |
| 2023–2024 | Khimki | 14 | (0) |
| 2023–2024 | Khimki-M | 3 | (1) |
| 2024–2025 | Baltika Kaliningrad | 33 | (3) |
| 2025 | Baltika-2 Kaliningrad | 1 | (0) |
| 2026 | Kaisar | 7 | (0) |
| 2026– | Spartak Kostroma | 0 | (0) |
- * Club domestic league appearances and goals as of 30 June 2026

Amir Khamayuni Mokhammad (Russian: Амир Хамаюни Мохаммад; born 23 February 1996) is a Russian football player of Afghan-Dagestani descent who plays for Spartak Kostroma. He plays in multiple positions on the left flank, as a midfielder, winger or a back.

== Club career ==
He made his debut in the Russian Professional Football League for Legion Dynamo Makhachkala on 28 July 2016 in a game against SKA Rostov-on-Don.

On 25 July 2018, he signed with the Russian Premier League club Anzhi Makhachkala. He made his Russian Premier League debut for Anzhi on 28 July 2018 in a game against Ural Yekaterinburg.

In August 2020, Amir signed with Krasny for the 2020–21 season. On 20 September 2020, he has scored his debut goal for Krasny against Saturn Ramenskoye.

On 27 December 2025, Amir's contract with Baltika Kaliningrad was mutually terminated.

On 10 February 2026, Amir joined Kaisar in Kazakhstan.

== Personal life ==
He is the younger brother of Sharif Mukhammad, another Daghestani-born Afghan football player.

== Career statistics ==
As of 2 November 2025

| Club | Season | League | | | Cup | | Continental | | Total | |
| Club | Season | Division | Apps | Goals | Apps | Goals | Apps | Goals | Apps | Goals |
|---|---|---|---|---|---|---|---|---|---|---|
| Legion Dynamo Makhachkala | 2016–17 | Russian Second League | 24 | 1 | 3 | 0 | – | | 27 | 1 |
| Legion Dynamo Makhachkala | 2017–18 | Russian Second League | 31 | 11 | 1 | 0 | – | | 32 | 11 |
| Legion Dynamo Makhachkala | Total | | 55 | 12 | 4 | 0 | 0 | 0 | 59 | 12 |
| Anzhi Makhachkala | 2018–19 | Russian Premier League | 6 | 0 | 1 | 0 | – | | 7 | 0 |
| Legion Dynamo Makhachkala (loan) | 2018–19 | Russian Second League | 7 | 0 | – | | – | | 7 | 0 |
| Legion Dynamo Makhachkala | 2019–20 | Russian Second League | 16 | 2 | 1 | 1 | – | | 17 | 3 |
| Krasny | 2020–21 | Russian Second League | 10 | 2 | – | | – | | 10 | 2 |
| Avangard Kursk | 2020–21 | Russian Second League | 10 | 0 | – | | – | | 10 | 0 |
| Avangard Kursk | 2021–22 | Russian Second League | 25 | 6 | 2 | 1 | – | | 27 | 7 |
| Avangard Kursk | Total | | 35 | 6 | 2 | 1 | 0 | 0 | 37 | 7 |
| KAMAZ | 2022–23 | Russian First League | 32 | 3 | 3 | 0 | – | | 35 | 3 |
| Khimki | 2023–24 | Russian First League | 14 | 0 | 3 | 0 | – | | 17 | 0 |
| Khimki-M | 2023 | Russian Second League B | 2 | 1 | – | | – | | 2 | 1 |
| Khimki-M | 2024 | Russian Second League B | 1 | 0 | – | | – | | 1 | 0 |
| Khimki-M | Total | | 3 | 1 | 0 | 0 | 0 | 0 | 3 | 1 |
| Baltika Kaliningrad | 2024–25 | Russian First League | 32 | 3 | 1 | 0 | – | | 33 | 3 |
| Baltika Kaliningrad | 2025–26 | Russian Premier League | 1 | 0 | 5 | 0 | – | | 6 | 0 |
| Baltika Kaliningrad | Total | | 33 | 3 | 6 | 0 | 0 | 0 | 39 | 3 |
| Baltika-2 Kaliningrad | 2025 | Russian Second League B | 1 | 0 | – | | – | | 1 | 0 |
| Career total | | | 212 | 29 | 20 | 2 | 0 | 0 | 232 | 31 |
