= Gaël Ondoua =

Cameroonian footballer

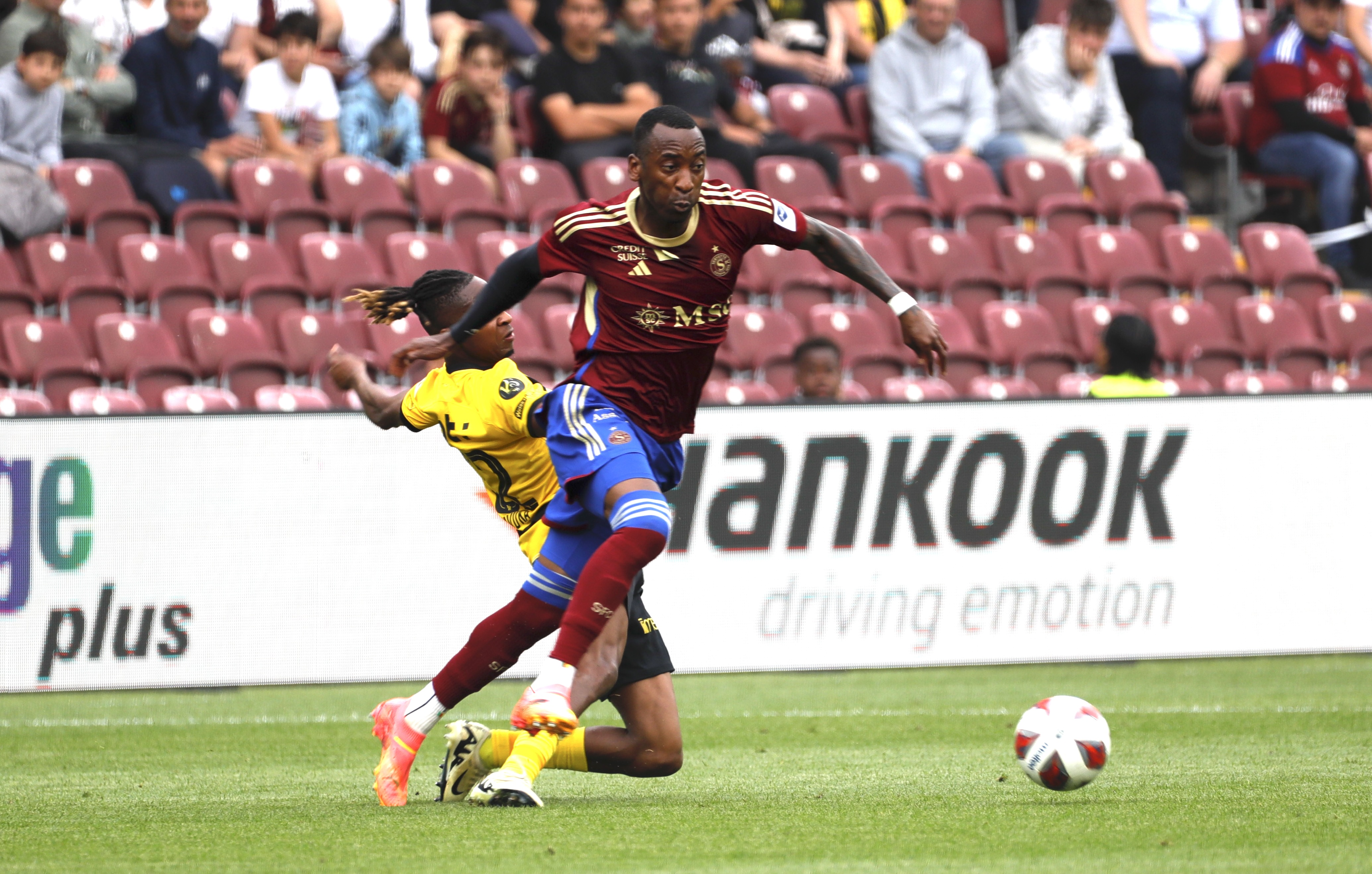
- Ondoua with Servette in 2024

Personal information
- Full name: Gaël Nesterovich Bella Ondoua
- Date of birth: 4 November 1995 (age 31)
- Place of birth: Yaoundé, Cameroon
- Height: 1.87 m (6 ft 2 in)
- Position: Defensive midfielder

Youth career
- –2014: Lokomotiv Moscow

Senior career*
Years	Team	Apps	(Gls)
2014–2015	CSKA Moscow	0	(0)
2016–2017	Vejle BK	23	(2)
2017–2018	Zorya Luhansk	0	(0)
2018–2019	Anzhi Makhachkala	25	(0)
2019–2021	Servette	54	(3)
2021–2023	Hannover 96	29	(0)
2023–2026	Servette	68	(2)

International career^{‡}
2022–2023	Cameroon	8	(0)
- * Club domestic league appearances and goals as of 26 May 2026 ‡ National team caps and goals as of 00:45, 17 November 2023 (UTC)

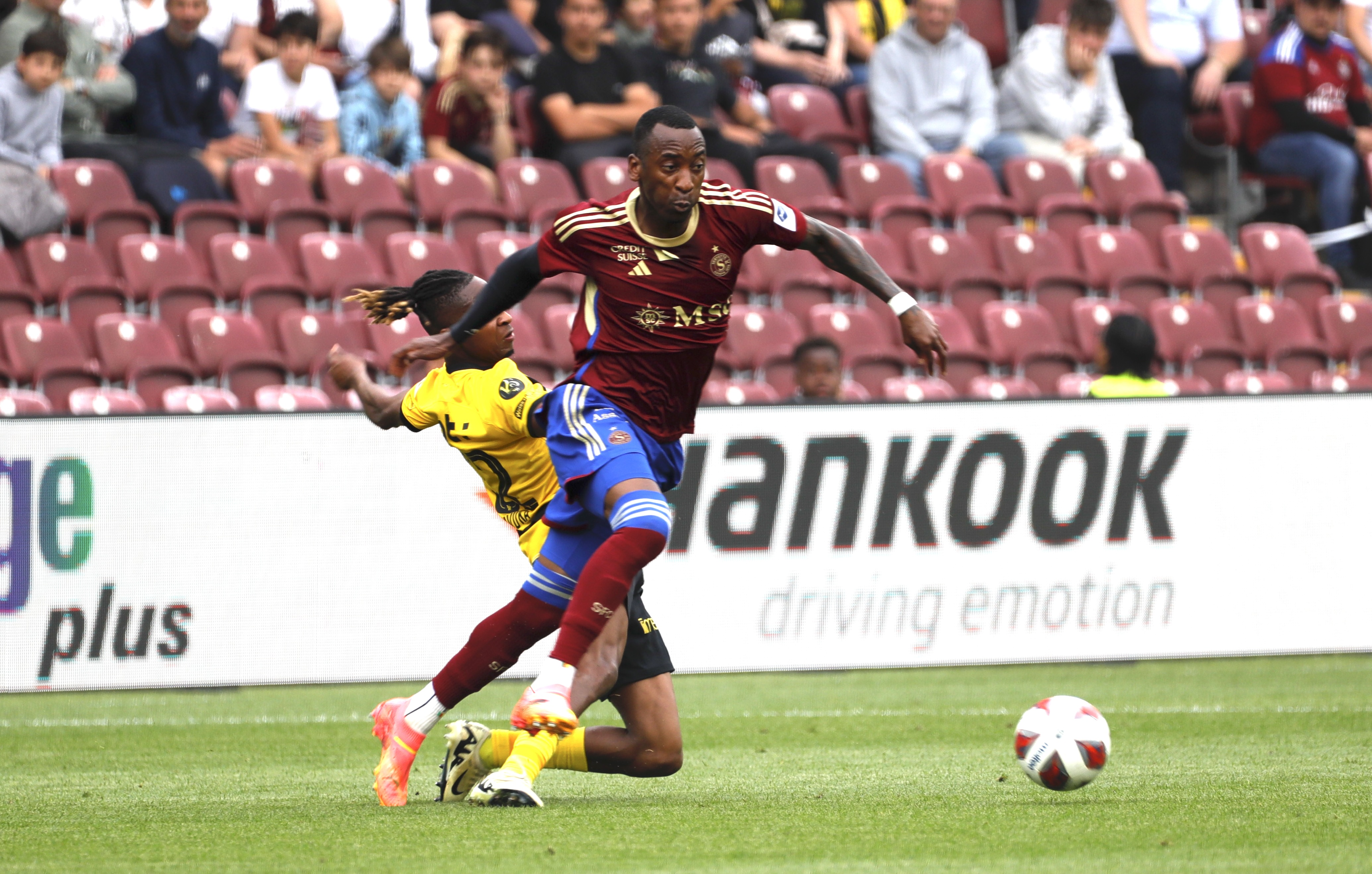
Ondoua with Servette against Young Boys in 2024

Gaël Nesterovich Bella Ondoua (born 4 November 1995), more known as Gaël Ondoua, is a Cameroonian professional footballer who plays as a defensive midfielder for the Cameroon national team.

== Club career ==
In April 2014, Ondoua moved from Lokomotiv Moscow to CSKA Moscow. He made his professional debut on 24 September 2014 for CSKA Moscow in a Russian Cup game against Khimik Dzerzhinsk. In January 2015, Ondoua went on trial with Sakhalin Yuzhno-Sakhalinsk of the Russian Football National League.

At the end of December 2017, it was reported that Ondoua had signed with Zorya Luhansk. On 12 March, however, he posted on his Instagram account that due circumstances beyond his contract he would not be a Zorya Luhansk player.

On 27 July 2018, Ondoua signed with the Russian Premier League club Anzhi Makhachkala.

On 2 July 2019, he signed with Swiss club Servette on a two-year contract plus an option year.

On 26 August 2021, Ondoua joined German club Hannover 96, signing a two-year contract.

On 21 July 2023, Ondoua returned to Servette. On 8 August, with Servette due to take on Scottish club Rangers in the UEFA Champions League qualifying round, he was denied a visa to enter the United Kingdom.

== International career ==
Ondoua debuted with the Cameroon national team in a 1–0 2022 World Cup qualification loss to Algeria on 25 March 2022. He was part of Cameroon's squad for the 2022 FIFA World Cup in Qatar where he made headlines after wearing the Russian flag on his boots amidst the Russian invasion of Ukraine.

== Personal life ==
Ondoua grew up in Russia, where his father was a diplomat. He is fluent in Russian and holds Russian citizenship.

== Career statistics ==
As of match played 24 August 2023

Appearances and goals by club, season and competition
Club	Season	League			National cup (Note: Includes Russian Cup, Danish Cup, Swiss Cup, DFB-Pokal)		Continental		Other		Total	
Club	Season	Division	Apps	Goals	Apps	Goals	Apps	Goals	Apps	Goals	Apps	Goals
CSKA Moscow	2014–15	Russian Premier League	0	0	1	0	0	0	0	0	1	0
Vejle BK	2016–17	Danish 1st Division	23	2	2	0	—		—		25	2
Zorya Luhansk	2017–18	Ukrainian Premier League	0	0	0	0	—		—		0	0
Anzhi Makhachkala	2018–19	Russian Premier League	25	0	2	0	—		—		27	0
Servette	2019–20	Swiss Super League	30	2	1	0	—		—		31	2
Servette	2020–21	Swiss Super League	24	1	2	1	2	0	—		28	2
Servette	Total		54	3	3	1	2	0	—		59	4
Hannover	2021–22	2. Bundesliga	27	0	3	0	—		—		30	0
Hannover	2022–23	2. Bundesliga	2	0	0	0	—		—		2	0
Hannover	Total		29	0	3	0	—		—		32	0
Servette	2023–24	Swiss Super League	2	0	0	0	3	0	—		5	0
Career total			133	5	11	1	5	0	0	0	149	5

== Honours ==
Servette FC

- Swiss Cup: 2023–24
