= FC Krasny =

Russian football club

- Full name: Football Club Krasny
- Nickname: Wolves
- Founded: 2002
- Ground: SGAFKST Arena, Smolensk
- Capacity: 2,000
- Chairman: Roman Timshkov
- 2020–21: PFL, Group 3, 10th
Home colours	Away colours

FC Krasny (Russian: ФК «Красный») is a Russian football team based in Krasny. It was founded in 2002 and played on the amateur level. For 2020–21 season, it received the license for the third-tier Russian Professional Football League. It failed to receive the PFL license for the 2021–22 season.
