= Magomed Magomedov (footballer, born 1997) =

Russian footballer

Personal information
- Full name: Magomed Shamilovich Magomedov
- Date of birth: 22 July 1997 (age 29)
- Place of birth: Moscow, Russia
- Height: 1.70 m (5 ft 7 in)
- Position: Midfielder

Senior career*
Years	Team	Apps	(Gls)
2015–2019	Anzhi Makhachkala	1	(0)
2017	→ Anzhi-2 Makhachkala	17	(3)
2018	→ Legion Dynamo Makhachkala (loan)	14	(2)
2019	Legion Dynamo Makhachkala	5	(0)
2019–2022	Anzhi Makhachkala	70	(24)
2022–2023	Rotor Volgograd	16	(1)
2023–2024	Mashuk-KMV Pyatigorsk	26	(6)
2024–2026	Dynamo Stavropol	42	(7)
- * Club domestic league appearances and goals as of 22 November 2025

Magomed Shamilovich Magomedov (Russian: Магомед Шамилович Магомедов; born 22 July 1997) is a Russian football player.

== Club career ==
He made his debut in the Russian Professional Football League for Anzhi-2 Makhachkala on 19 July 2017 in a game against Chernomorets Novorossiysk.

He made his debut for the main squad of Anzhi Makhachkala on 20 September 2017 in a Russian Cup game against Luch-Energiya Vladivostok.

He made his Russian Premier League debut for Anzhi on 26 May 2019 in a game against Ural Yekaterinburg, as a 66th-minute substitute for Apti Akhyadov.
