= Ruslan Kul =

Russian footballer (born 2000)

Personal information
- Full name: Ruslan Rasimovich Kul
- Date of birth: 22 February 2000 (age 26)
- Height: 1.87 m (6 ft 2 in)
- Positions: Central midfielder; attacking midfielder

Team information
- Current team: Orenburg
- Number: 78

Youth career
- –2018: Lokomotiv Moscow
- 2019–2020: Arsenal Tula

Senior career*
Years	Team	Apps	(Gls)
2020–2021	Khimik-Arsenal	25	(2)
2021–2022	Sokol Saratov	30	(8)
2022–2025	Rodina Moscow	28	(2)
2022–2023	Rodina-2 Moscow	3	(3)
2023–2024	→ KAMAZ (loan)	19	(3)
2024–2025	→ Shinnik Yaroslavl (loan)	32	(0)
2025–2026	Shinnik Yaroslavl	21	(3)
2026–	Orenburg	23	(2)
- * Club domestic league appearances and goals as of 21 November 2026

Ruslan Rasimovich Kul (Russian: Руслан Расимович Куль; born 22 February 2000) is a Russian football player who plays as a central midfielder or attacking midfielder for Orenburg.

== Career ==
Kul was raised in the Lokomotiv Moscow youth system and represented Lokomotiv in the 2018–19 UEFA Youth League, scoring in a 2–1 victory over eventual champions Porto.

On 30 January 2026, Kul signed with Russian Premier League club Orenburg. He made his RPL debut for Orenburg on 28 February 2026 in a game against Akron Tolyatti, as a starter.

== Career statistics ==
As of 21 November 2026

Club	Season	League			Cup		Other		Total	
Club	Season	Division	Apps	Goals	Apps	Goals	Apps	Goals	Apps	Goals
Khimik-Arsenal	2020–21	Russian Second League	25	2	—		—		25	2
Sokol Saratov	2021–22	Russian Second League	30	8	1	0	—		31	8
Rodina Moscow	2022–23	Russian First League	23	1	1	0	1 (Note: Appearance in promotion play-offs)	0	25	1
Rodina Moscow	2023–24	Russian First League	5	1	—		—		5	1
Rodina Moscow	Total		28	2	1	0	1	0	30	2
Rodina-2 Moscow	2022–23	Russian Second League	3	3	—		—		3	3
KAMAZ (loan)	2023–24	Russian First League	19	3	2	0	—		21	3
Shinnik Yaroslavl (loan)	2024–25	Russian First League	32	0	4	0	—		36	0
Shinnik Yaroslavl	2025–26	Russian First League	21	3	2	0	—		23	3
Orenburg	2025–26	Russian Premier League	9	0	0	0	—		9	0
Orenburg	2026–27	Russian Premier League	14	2	5	0	—		19	2
Orenburg	Total		23	2	5	0	0	0	28	2
Career total			181	23	15	0	1	0	197	23
