= Pavel Kaloshin =

Russian footballer

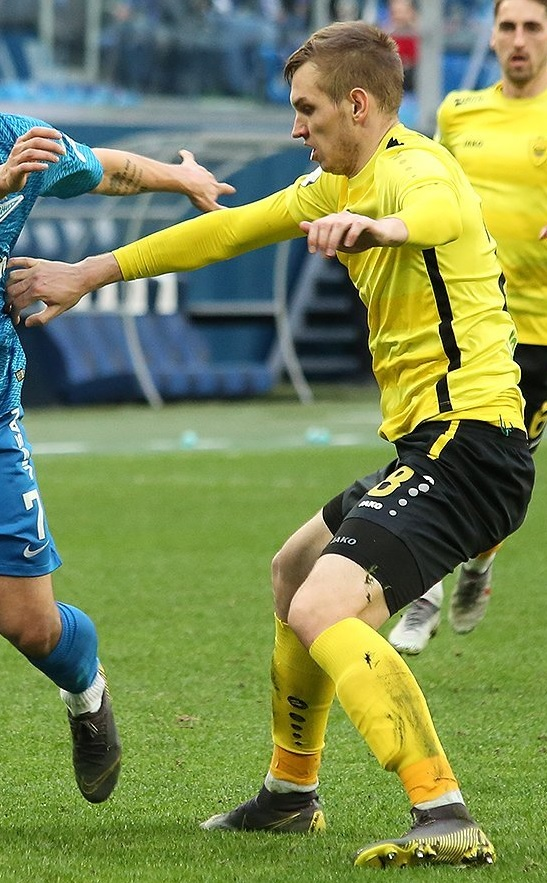
- Kaloshin with Anzhi in 2019

Personal information
- Full name: Pavel Sergeyevich Kaloshin
- Date of birth: 13 March 1998 (age 28)
- Place of birth: Balashikha, Russia
- Height: 1.97 m (6 ft 6 in)
- Position: Defender

Youth career
- –2011: SDYuSShOR №63 Smena Moscow
- 2011–2015: FC Spartak Moscow
- 2016: FC Khimki
- 2016: FC Arsenal Tula
- 2017: FC Dolgoprudny
- 2017: FC Tosno
- 2018: FC Anzhi Makhachkala

Senior career*
Years	Team	Apps	(Gls)
2019	FC Anzhi Makhachkala	12	(0)
2019–2021	FC Akhmat Grozny	0	(0)
2019–2020	→ FC Torpedo Moscow (loan)	2	(0)
2021	FC Irtysh Omsk	6	(0)
2022	FC Kolomna	3	(0)
- * Club domestic league appearances and goals

Pavel Sergeyevich Kaloshin (Russian: Павел Сергеевич Калошин; born 13 March 1998) is a Russian former football player.

== Club career ==
He made his debut in the Russian Premier League for FC Anzhi Makhachkala on 1 March 2019 in a game against FC Orenburg, as a starter.

On 5 July 2019, he signed a 5-year contract with FC Akhmat Grozny and was immediately loaned to FC Torpedo Moscow for the 2019–20 season.
