= Igor Udaly =

Russian footballer

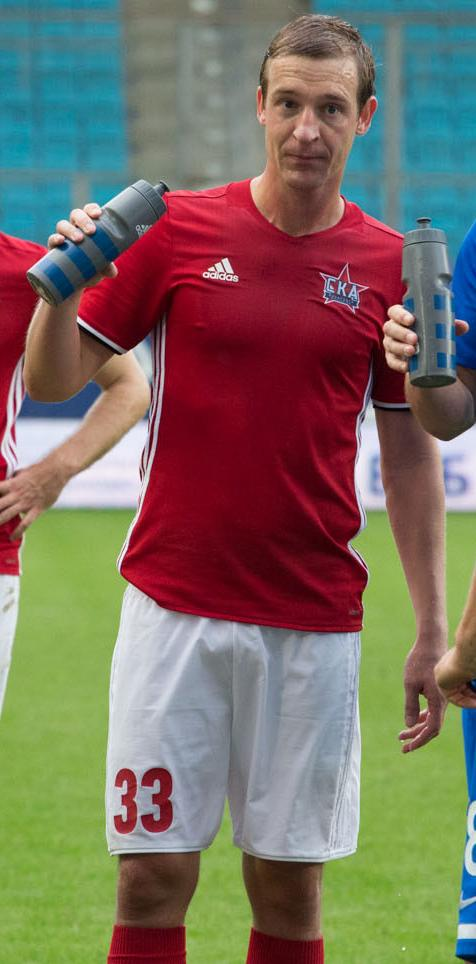
- Udaly with SKA-Khabarovsk in 2016

Personal information
- Full name: Igor Alekseyevich Udaly
- Date of birth: 8 December 1984 (age 41)
- Place of birth: Krasnodar, Soviet Union
- Height: 1.86 m (6 ft 1 in)
- Position: Defender

Senior career*
Years	Team	Apps	(Gls)
2003	FC Kuban Krasnodar	0	(0)
2005	FC Sodovik Sterlitamak	10	(0)
2006	FC Meteor Zhukovsky		
2006	FC Dynamo Makhachkala	19	(2)
2007–2009	FC Chernomorets Novorossiysk	99	(6)
2010–2012	FC Luch-Energiya Vladivostok	79	(2)
2012–2017	FC SKA-Khabarovsk	121	(6)
2013	→ FC Luch-Energiya Vladivostok (loan)	8	(0)
2017–2019	FC Anzhi Makhachkala	25	(0)
2017–2018	→ FC Orenburg (loan)	28	(2)
2019–2020	FC Rotor Volgograd	14	(0)
- * Club domestic league appearances and goals

Igor Alekseyevich Udaly (Russian: Игорь Алексеевич Удалый; born 8 December 1984) is a Russian former professional football player.

== Club career ==
He made his Russian Premier League debut for FC Anzhi Makhachkala on 28 July 2018 in a game against FC Ural Yekaterinburg, after playing the first 13 seasons of his career in the lower-tier leagues, mostly Russian Football National League.

== Career statistics ==
As of 17 August 2018

Club	Season	League			Cup		Continental		Other		Total	
Club	Season	Division	Apps	Goals	Apps	Goals	Apps	Goals	Apps	Goals	Apps	Goals
FC Kuban Krasnodar	2003	FNL	0	0	0	0	–		–		0	0
FC Lotos-Land Krasnodar	2004	Amateur	–									
FC Sodovik Sterlitamak	2005	PFL	10	0	3	0	–		–		13	0
FC Dynamo Makhachkala	2006	FNL	19	2	1	0	–		–		20	2
FC Chernomorets Novorossiysk	2007	PFL	28	2	1	0	–		–		29	2
FC Chernomorets Novorossiysk	2008	FNL	41	3	1	0	–		–		42	3
FC Chernomorets Novorossiysk	2009	FNL	30	1	1	0	–		–		31	1
FC Chernomorets Novorossiysk	Total		99	6	3	0	0	0	0	0	102	6
FC Luch-Energiya Vladivostok	2010	FNL	35	2	2	0	–		–		37	2
FC Luch-Energiya Vladivostok	2011–12	FNL	44	0	3	0	–		–		47	0
FC SKA-Energiya Khabarovsk	2012–13	FNL	3	0	1	0	–		–		4	0
FC Luch-Energiya Vladivostok	2012–13	PFL	8	0	–		–		–		8	0
FC Luch-Energiya Vladivostok	Total (2 spells)		87	2	5	0	0	0	0	0	92	2
FC SKA-Khabarovsk	2013–14	FNL	30	1	1	0	–		–		31	1
FC SKA-Khabarovsk	2014–15	FNL	23	0	1	0	–		–		24	0
FC SKA-Khabarovsk	2015–16	FNL	33	3	3	1	–		–		36	4
FC SKA-Khabarovsk	2016–17	FNL	32	2	2	0	–		2 (Note: Two appearances in promotion play-offs)	0	36	2
FC SKA-Khabarovsk	Total (2 spells)		121	6	8	1	0	0	2	0	131	7
FC Anzhi Makhachkala	2017–18	Russian Premier League	0	0	–		–		–		0	0
FC Orenburg	2017–18	FNL	28	2	1	0	–		–		29	2
FC Anzhi Makhachkala	2018–19	Russian Premier League	4	0	–		–		–		4	0
FC Anzhi Makhachkala	Total (2 spells)		4	0	0	0	0	0	0	0	4	0
Career total			368	18	21	1	0	0	2	0	391	19
