= Jhon Chancellor =

Venezuelan football player (born 1992)

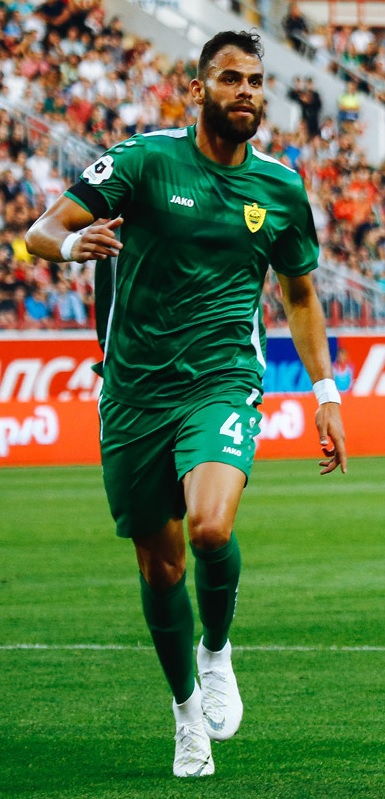
- Chancellor with Anzhi Makhachkala in 2018

Personal information
- Full name: Jhon Carlos Chancellor Cedeño
- Date of birth: 2 January 1992 (age 34)
- Place of birth: Puerto Ordaz, Venezuela
- Height: 1.98 m (6 ft 6 in)
- Position: Centre-back

Team information
- Current team: Universidad Católica
- Number: 5

Senior career*
| Years | Team | Apps | (Gls) |
| 2010–2013 | Mineros de Guayana | 38 | (2) |
| 2013–2015 | Deportivo Lara | 51 | (4) |
| 2013–2017 | Mineros de Guayana | 33 | (6) |
| 2016 | → Deportivo La Guaira (loan) | 9 | (0) |
| 2017 | Delfín | 38 | (3) |
| 2018–2019 | Anzhi Makhachkala | 15 | (0) |
| 2019 | Al Ahli | 6 | (1) |
| 2019–2022 | Brescia | 61 | (4) |
| 2022 | Zagłębie Lubin | 7 | (0) |
| 2022–2023 | Coritiba | 27 | (1) |
| 2023 | Necaxa | 5 | (0) |
| 2024 | Metropolitanos | 9 | (2) |
| 2024– | Universidad Católica | 28 | (0) |

International career^{‡}
| 2011 | Venezuela U20 | 4 | (0) |
| 2017– | Venezuela | 37 | (3) |
- * Club domestic league appearances and goals as of 20 August 2025 ‡ National team caps and goals as of 00:15, 2 January 2025 (UTC)

Jhon Carlos Chancellor Cedeño (born 2 January 1992) is a Venezuelan professional footballer who plays as a centre-back for Universidad Católica and the Venezuela national team.

== Career ==
On 10 January 2018, Chancellor signed a two-and-a-half-year contract with Russian Premier League club FC Anzhi Makhachkala.

On 14 February 2019, Anzhi Makhachkala announced that Chancellor had moved to Qatar Stars League club Al Ahli.

On 21 July 2019, Chancellor signed a one-year deal, subsequently extended to 3 years, with Serie A side Brescia.

On 28 February 2022, he joined Polish Ekstraklasa club Zagłębie Lubin until the end of the season, with a one-year extension option. On 25 May 2022, it was revealed he would not extend his contract and would leave the team at the end of the season.

== Career statistics ==
=== Club ===
As of 27 July 2023

Appearances and goals by club, season and competition
| Club | Season | League | | | National cup (Note: Includes Copa Venezuela, Russian Cup, Coppa Italia, Copa do Brasil) | | League cup (Note: Includes [[]]) | | Continental | | Other | | Total | |
| Club | Season | Division | Apps | Goals | Apps | Goals | Apps | Goals | Apps | Goals | Apps | Goals | Apps | Goals |
|---|---|---|---|---|---|---|---|---|---|---|---|---|---|---|
| Mineros de Guayana | 2010–11 | Liga Venezolana | 16 | 0 | 0 | 0 | — | | — | | — | | 16 | 0 |
| Mineros de Guayana | 2011–12 | Liga Venezolana | 7 | 0 | 0 | 0 | — | | — | | — | | 7 | 0 |
| Mineros de Guayana | 2012–13 | Liga Venezolana | 15 | 2 | 0 | 0 | — | | 2 (Note: Appearance(s) in Copa Sudamericana) | 0 | — | | 17 | 2 |
| Mineros de Guayana | Total | | 38 | 2 | 0 | 0 | — | | 2 | 0 | — | | 40 | 2 |
| Deportivo Lara | 2013–14 | Liga Venezolana | 19 | 0 | 0 | 0 | — | | 1 | 0 | — | | 20 | 0 |
| Deportivo Lara | 2014–15 | Liga Venezolana | 32 | 4 | 0 | 0 | — | | — | | — | | 32 | 4 |
| Deportivo Lara | Total | | 51 | 4 | 0 | 0 | — | | 1 | 0 | — | | 52 | 4 |
| Mineros de Guayana | 2015 | Liga Venezolana | 20 | 4 | 2 | 0 | — | | — | | — | | 22 | 4 |
| Mineros de Guayana | 2016 | Liga Venezolana | 13 | 2 | 0 | 0 | – | | – | | – | | 13 | 2 |
| Mineros de Guayana | Total | | 33 | 6 | 2 | 0 | — | | — | | — | | 35 | 6 |
| Deportivo La Guaira (loan) | 2016 | Liga Venezolana | 9 | 0 | 0 | 0 | — | | 4 | 0 | — | | 13 | 0 |
| Delfín | 2017 | Primera A | 38 | 3 | — | | — | | — | | — | | 38 | 3 |
| Anzhi Makhachkala | 2017–18 | Russian Premier League | 1 | 0 | 0 | 0 | — | | — | | — | | 1 | 0 |
| Anzhi Makhachkala | 2018–19 | Russian Premier League | 14 | 0 | 2 | 1 | — | | — | | — | | 16 | 1 |
| Anzhi Makhachkala | Total | | 15 | 0 | 2 | 1 | — | | — | | — | | 17 | 1 |
| Al Ahli | 2018–19 | Qatar Stars League | 6 | 1 | 0 | 0 | — | | — | | — | | 6 | 1 |
| Brescia | 2019–20 | Serie A | 26 | 3 | 1 | 0 | — | | — | | — | | 27 | 3 |
| Brescia | 2020–21 | Serie A | 21 | 0 | 1 | 0 | — | | — | | — | | 22 | 0 |
| Brescia | 2021–22 | Serie A | 14 | 1 | 0 | 0 | — | | — | | — | | 14 | 1 |
| Brescia | Total | | 61 | 4 | 2 | 0 | — | | — | | — | | 63 | 4 |
| Zagłębie Lubin | 2021–22 | Ekstraklasa | 7 | 0 | — | | — | | — | | — | | 7 | 0 |
| Coritiba | 2022 | Série A | 13 | 0 | — | | — | | — | | — | | 13 | 0 |
| Coritiba | 2023 | Série A | 4 | 0 | 1 | 0 | — | | — | | 10 (Note: Appearances in Campeonato Paranaense) | 1 | 15 | 1 |
| Coritiba | Total | | 17 | 0 | 1 | 0 | — | | — | | 10 | 1 | 28 | 1 |
| Career total | | | 275 | 21 | 7 | 1 | 0 | 0 | 7 | 0 | 10 | 1 | 299 | 22 |

=== International ===
As of 12 April 2023

Appearances and goals by national team and year
| National team | Year | Apps | Goals |
|---|---|---|---|
Venezuela
| Venezuela | 2017 | 6 | 0 |
| Venezuela | 2018 | 3 | 0 |
| Venezuela | 2019 | 6 | 0 |
| Venezuela | 2020 | 3 | 0 |
| Venezuela | 2021 | 6 | 2 |
| Venezuela | 2022 | 8 | 1 |
| Venezuela | 2023 | 2 | 0 |
| Total | | 34 | 3 |

Scores and results list Venezuela's goal tally first, score column indicates score after each Chancellor goal.

List of international goals scored by Jhon Chancellor
| No. | Date | Venue | Opponent | Score | Result | Competition |
|---|---|---|---|---|---|---|
| 1 | 3 June 2021 | Estadio Hernando Siles, La Paz, Bolivia | Bolivia | 1–1 | 1–3 | 2022 FIFA World Cup qualification |
| 2 | 9 September 2021 | Estadio Defensores del Chaco, Asunción, Paraguay | Paraguay | 1–2 | 1–2 | 2022 FIFA World Cup qualification |
| 3 | 27 September 2022 | Stadion Wiener Neustadt, Wiener Neustadt, Austria | United Arab Emirates | 3–0 | 4–0 | Friendly |
