= Danil Glebov =

Russian association football player

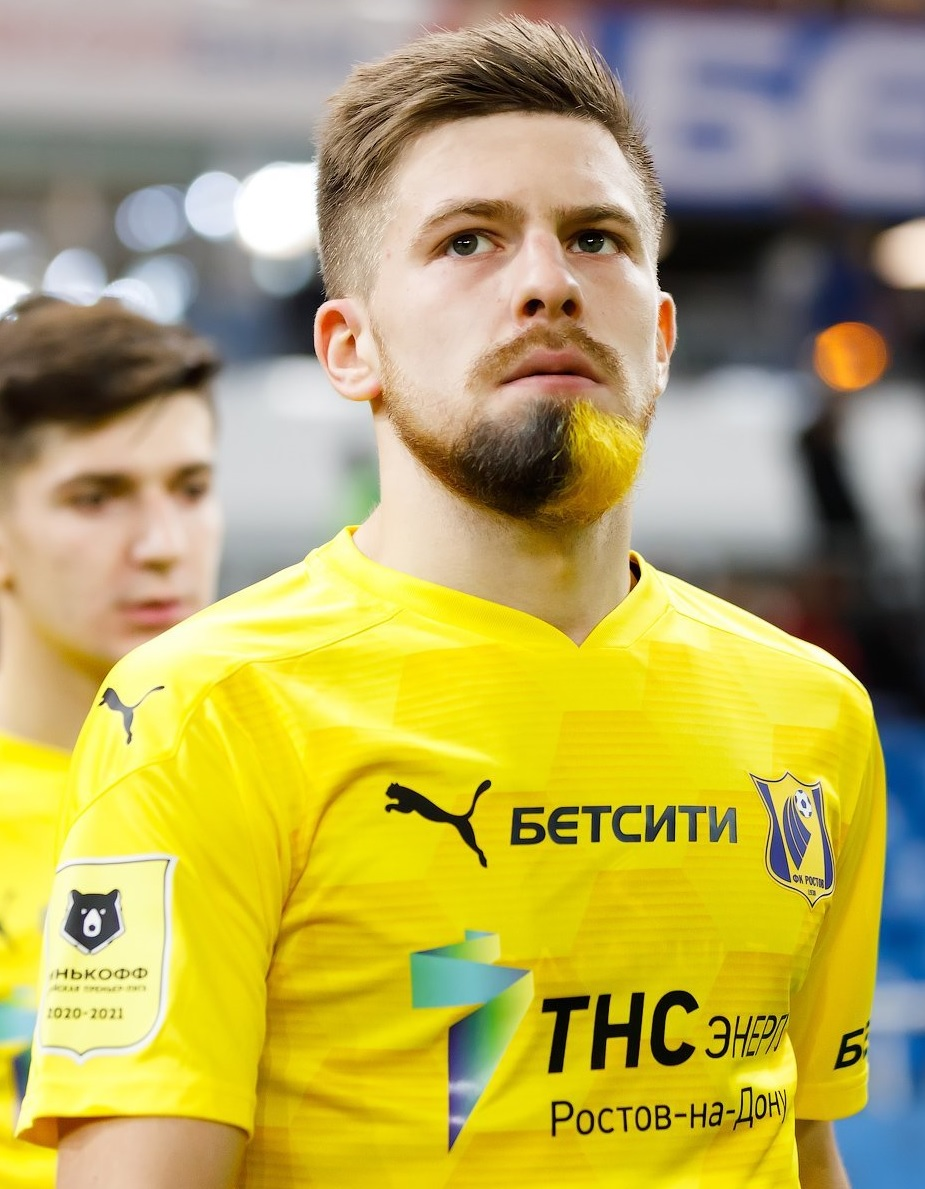
- Glebov with FC Rostov in 2020

Personal information
- Full name: Danil Aleksandrovich Glebov
- Date of birth: 3 November 1999 (age 27)
- Place of birth: Tomsk, Russia
- Height: 1.76 m (5 ft 9 in)
- Position: Midfielder

Team information
- Current team: Dynamo Moscow
- Number: 15

Youth career
- 2006–2015: Tom Tomsk
- 2015–2016: Lokomotiv Moscow
- 2016–2017: Anzhi Makhachkala

Senior career*
Years	Team	Apps	(Gls)
2017–2018	Anzhi-2 Makhachkala	4	(0)
2018	Anzhi Makhachkala	8	(0)
2019–2025	Rostov	158	(12)
2025–	Dynamo Moscow	45	(1)

International career^{‡}
2019–2021	Russia U-21	15	(2)
2021–	Russia	18	(0)
- * Club domestic league appearances and goals as of 22 November 2026 ‡ National team caps and goals as of 17 November 2026

Danil Aleksandrovich Glebov (Russian: Дани́л Алекса́ндрович Гле́бов; born 3 November 1999) is a Russian football player who plays as a central midfielder for Dynamo Moscow and the Russia national team.

== Club career ==
He made his debut in the Russian Professional Football League for FC Anzhi-2 Makhachkala on 19 November 2017 in a game against FC Armavir.

He made his debut in the Russian Premier League for FC Anzhi Makhachkala on 1 September 2018 in a game against FC Krylia Sovetov Samara.

On 13 January 2019, he signed with FC Rostov.

On 20 February 2025, Glebov moved to Dynamo Moscow on a five-year contract. On 16 October 2026, he extended his Dynamo contract to June 2031.

== International career ==
He was called up to the Russia national football team for the first time for World Cup qualifiers against Slovakia and Slovenia in October 2021. He made his debut on 11 November 2021 in a game against Cyprus.

== Career statistics ==
=== Club ===
As of match played 22 November 2026

Appearances and goals by club, season and competition
Club	Season	League			Russian Cup		Europe		Other		Total	
Club	Season	Division	Apps	Goals	Apps	Goals	Apps	Goals	Apps	Goals	Apps	Goals
Anzhi-2 Makhachkala	2017–18	Russian Second League	4	0	—		—		—		4	0
Anzhi Makhachkala	2017–18	Russian Premier League	0	0	—		—		1 (Note: Appearance in the relegation play-offs)	0	1	0
Anzhi Makhachkala	2018–19	Russian Premier League	8	0	2	0	—		—		10	0
Anzhi Makhachkala	Total		8	0	2	0	—		1	0	11	0
Rostov	2018–19	Russian Premier League	8	0	3	0	—		—		11	0
Rostov	2019–20	Russian Premier League	19	0	2	0	—		—		21	0
Rostov	2020–21	Russian Premier League	26	1	1	0	1 (Note: Appearance in the UEFA Europa League)	0	—		28	1
Rostov	2021–22	Russian Premier League	30	4	1	0	—		—		31	4
Rostov	2022–23	Russian Premier League	28	4	10	0	—		—		38	4
Rostov	2023–24	Russian Premier League	30	2	9	0	—		—		39	2
Rostov	2024–25	Russian Premier League	17	1	6	0	—		—		23	1
Rostov	Total		158	12	32	0	1	0	—		191	12
Dynamo Moscow	2024–25	Russian Premier League	10	1	2	0	—		—		12	1
Dynamo Moscow	2025–26	Russian Premier League	21	0	5	0	—		—		26	0
Dynamo Moscow	2026–27	Russian Premier League	14	0	4	0	—		—		18	0
Dynamo Moscow	Total		45	1	11	0	0	0	0	0	56	1
Career total			215	13	45	0	1	0	1	0	262	13

=== International ===
As of match played 17 November 2026

Appearances and goals by national team and year
National team	Year	Apps	Goals
Russia	2021	2	0
Russia	2022	2	0
Russia	2023	5	0
Russia	2024	4	0
Russia	2025	3	0
Russia	2026	2	0
Total		18	0

== Honours ==
Individual

- Russian Premier League Player of the Month: November 2022.
- Russian Premier League Goal of the Month: November 2022.
