= Kamil Zakirov =

Russian footballer (born 1998)

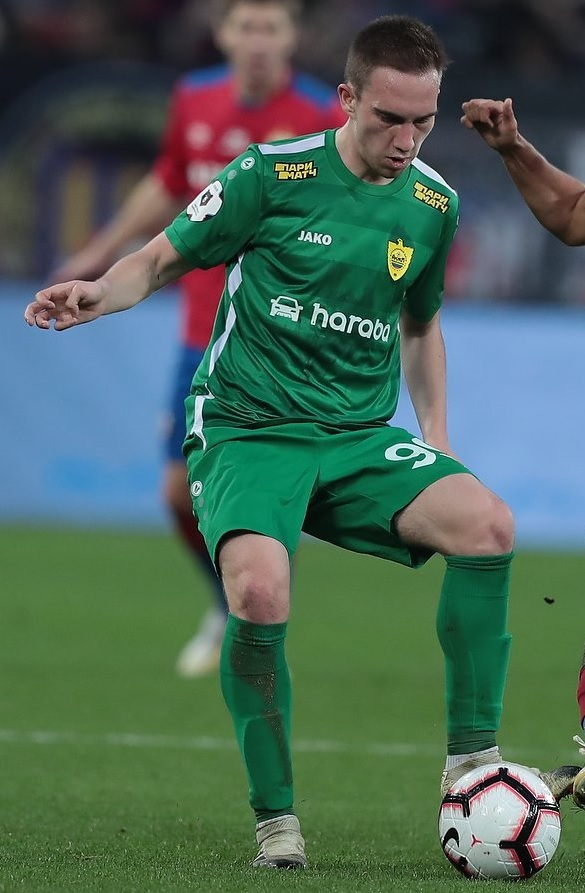
- Zakirov with Anzhi Makhachkala in 2019

Personal information
- Full name: Kamil Myaskutovich Zakirov
- Date of birth: 15 November 1998 (age 27)
- Place of birth: Ulyanovsk, Russia
- Height: 1.74 m (5 ft 9 in)
- Position: Midfielder

Youth career
- Krasnodar

Senior career*
Years	Team	Apps	(Gls)
2017–2019	Anzhi Makhachkala	13	(1)
2018	→ Anzhi-2 Makhachkala	11	(0)
2019–2021	Rubin Kazan	3	(0)
2020	→ Volgar Astrakhan (loan)	1	(0)
2020	→ Minsk (loan)	2	(0)
2021	→ Noah Jūrmala (loan)	7	(1)
2021	Dynamo St. Petersburg	5	(0)
2022	Tuapse	8	(1)
2022–2023	Tver	14	(2)
2023	Torpedo Vladimir	1	(1)
- * Club domestic league appearances and goals

Kamil Myaskutovich Zakirov (Russian: Камиль Мяскутович Закиров; born 15 November 1998) is a Russian former football player.

== Club career ==
He made his debut in the Russian Professional Football League for FC Anzhi-2 Makhachkala on 10 March 2018 in a game against FC Akademiya Futbola Rostov-on-Don.

He made his Russian Premier League debut for FC Anzhi Makhachkala on 1 March 2019 in a game against FC Orenburg, as a starter.

On 13 June 2019, he signed a 4-year contract with FC Rubin Kazan. On 21 February 2020, he joined FC Volgar Astrakhan on loan until the end of the 2019–20 season. On 30 August 2020, he joined FC Minsk on loan until 15 December 2020.
