= Shakhban Gaydarov =

Russian footballer

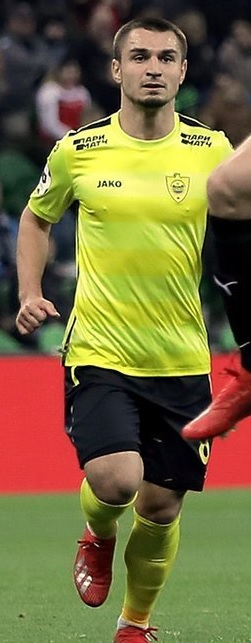
- Gaydarov with Anzhi Makhachkala in 2019

Personal information
- Full name: Shakhban Kurbanovich Gaydarov
- Date of birth: 21 January 1997 (age 29)
- Place of birth: Tlyarata, Russia
- Height: 1.76 m (5 ft 9 in)
- Position: Midfielder

Senior career*
Years	Team	Apps	(Gls)
2015–2019	FC Anzhi Makhachkala	7	(0)
2017–2018	→ FC Anzhi-2 Makhachkala	29	(0)
2018	→ FC Legion Dynamo Makhachkala (loan)	11	(0)
2019	FC Legion Dynamo Makhachkala	4	(0)
2019–2022	FC Anzhi Makhachkala	64	(3)
2022–2023	PFC Dynamo Stavropol	29	(1)
2023–2024	FC Druzhba Maykop	49	(0)
- * Club domestic league appearances and goals as of 16 November 2024

Shakhban Kurbanovich Gaydarov (Russian: Шахбан Курбанович Гайдаров; born 21 January 1997) is a Russian football player.

== Club career ==
He made his debut in the Russian Professional Football League for FC Anzhi-2 Makhachkala on 19 July 2017 in a game against FC Chernomorets Novorossiysk.

He made his Russian Premier League debut for FC Anzhi Makhachkala on 10 March 2019 in a game against FC Lokomotiv Moscow.
