= Ivan Novoseltsev (footballer) =

Russian footballer

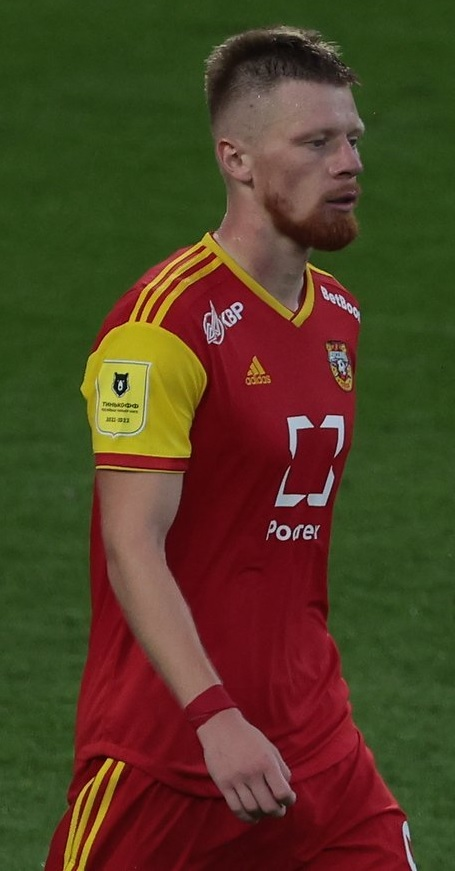
- Novoseltsev with Arsenal Tula in 2021

Personal information
- Full name: Ivan Yevgenyevich Novoseltsev
- Date of birth: 25 August 1991 (age 35)
- Place of birth: Moscow, Russian SFSR
- Height: 1.90 m (6 ft 3 in)
- Position: Defender

Youth career
- 2005–2011: Khimki

Senior career*
Years	Team	Apps	(Gls)
2011–2012	Istra	17	(0)
2012–2014	Torpedo Moscow	38	(1)
2014–2016	Rostov	44	(2)
2016–2019	Zenit St. Petersburg	5	(0)
2018	→ Arsenal Tula (loan)	2	(0)
2018	→ Anzhi Makhachkala (loan)	11	(1)
2019	→ Rostov (loan)	9	(0)
2019–2021	Sochi	33	(1)
2021–2022	Arsenal Tula	15	(1)

International career
2015–2016	Russia	5	(0)
- * Club domestic league appearances and goals

Ivan Yevgenyevich Novoseltsev (Russian: Иван Евгеньевич Новосельцев; born 25 August 1991) is a Russian former professional football player who played as a centre-back.

== Club career ==
In January 2015, Novoseltsev signed for FC Rostov.

On 31 August 2016, Novoseltsev moved to FC Zenit Saint Petersburg.

On 31 January 2018, Novoseltsev joined FC Arsenal Tula on loan until the end of the 2017–18 season.

On 27 July 2018, Novoseltsev joined Anzhi Makhachkala on loan until January 2019.

On 29 January 2019, Novoseltsev joined Rostov on loan until the end of the season.

On 2 July 2019, he left Zenit for PFC Sochi.

On 2 July 2021, he returned to Arsenal Tula. On 12 April 2022, Novoseltsev terminated his contract with Arsenal. He announced his retirement from playing on 13 March 2023.

== International career ==
Novoseltsev made his debut for the Russia national football team on 31 March 2015 in a friendly game against Kazakhstan.

== Career statistics ==
=== Club ===
As of 21 May 2022

Club	Season	League			Cup		Continental		Other		Total	
Club	Season	Division	Apps	Goals	Apps	Goals	Apps	Goals	Apps	Goals	Apps	Goals
Istra	2011–12	PFL	17	0	–		–		–		17	0
Torpedo Moscow	2012–13	FNL	13	1	0	0	–		–		13	1
Torpedo Moscow	2013–14	FNL	10	0	0	0	–		–		10	0
Torpedo Moscow	2014–15	RPL	15	0	1	0	–		–		16	0
Torpedo Moscow	Total		38	1	1	0	0	0	0	0	39	1
Rostov	2014–15	RPL	11	0	–		–		2 (Note: Appearances in the relegation play-offs)	0	13	0
Rostov	2015–16	RPL	28	0	0	0	–		–		28	0
Rostov	2016–17	RPL	5	2	–		4 (Note: Appearances in the UEFA Champions League)	0	–		9	2
Zenit St. Petersburg	2016–17	RPL	5	0	0	0	3 (Note: Appearances in the UEFA Europa League)	0	–		8	0
Zenit St. Petersburg	2017–18	RPL	0	0	1	0	0	0	–		1	0
Zenit St. Petersburg	Total		5	0	1	0	3	0	0	0	9	0
Arsenal Tula (loan)	2017–18	RPL	2	0	–		–		–		2	0
Anzhi Makhachkala (loan)	2018–19	RPL	11	1	1	0	–		–		12	1
Rostov (loan)	2018–19	RPL	9	0	3	0	–		–		12	0
Rostov (loan)	Total		53	2	3	0	4	0	2	0	62	2
Sochi	2019–20	RPL	18	1	1	0	–		–		19	1
Sochi	2020–21	RPL	15	0	1	0	–		–		16	0
Sochi	Total		33	1	2	0	0	0	0	0	35	1
Arsenal Tula	2021–22	RPL	15	1	1	0	–		–		16	1
Arsenal Tula	Total		17	1	1	0	0	0	0	0	18	1
Career total			174	6	9	0	7	0	2	0	192	6
