= Konstantin Savichev =

Russian footballer

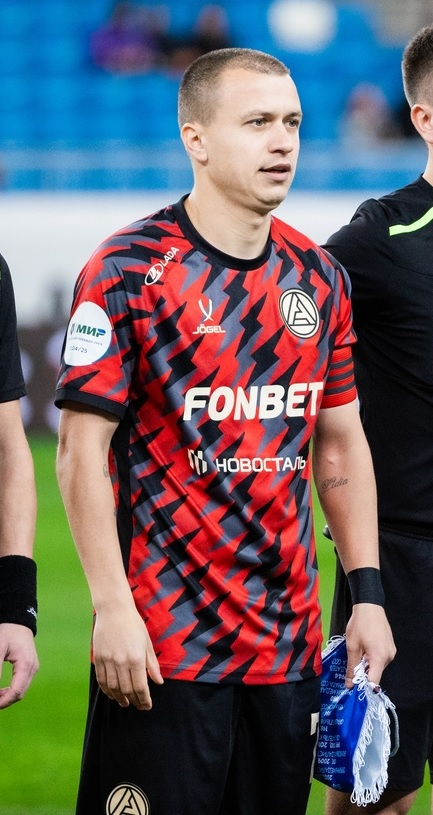
- Savichev with Akron Tolyatti in 2024

Personal information
- Full name: Konstantin Dmitriyevich Savichev
- Date of birth: 6 March 1994 (age 32)
- Place of birth: Bryansk, Russia
- Height: 1.70 m (5 ft 7 in)
- Position: Right-back

Team information
- Current team: SKA-Khabarovsk
- Number: 4

Youth career
- Master-Saturn Yegoryevsk
- Saturn Ramenskoye
- 2011–2013: Spartak Moscow

Senior career*
Years	Team	Apps	(Gls)
2013–2017	Spartak-2 Moscow	120	(14)
2016	Spartak Moscow	0	(0)
2017–2018	SKA-Khabarovsk	18	(1)
2018	Anzhi Makhachkala	14	(0)
2019–2020	Yenisey Krasnoyarsk	33	(4)
2020–2021	Chayka Peschanokopskoye	35	(6)
2021–2026	Akron Tolyatti	129	(9)
2026	Torpedo Moscow	13	(0)
2026–	SKA-Khabarovsk	0	(0)

International career^{‡}
2010	Russia U-16	4	(0)
2012	Russia U-18	2	(0)
2012	Russia U-19	1	(0)
2014–2015	Russia U-21	7	(0)
- * Club domestic league appearances and goals as of 16 May 2026 ‡ National team caps and goals as of 17 November 2015

Konstantin Dmitriyevich Savichev (Russian: Константин Дмитриевич Савичев; born 6 March 1994) is a Russian football player who plays as a right-back for SKA-Khabarovsk. Earlier in his career, he played as a right midfielder or right winger.

== Club career ==
Savichev made his debut in the Russian Professional Football League for Spartak-2 Moscow on 16 July 2013 in a game against Dynamo Bryansk.

He made his Russian Premier League debut for SKA-Khabarovsk on 16 July 2017 in a game against Zenit St. Petersburg.

On 24 January 2019, Savichev signed with Yenisey Krasnoyarsk.

On 12 January 2026, Savichev moved to Torpedo Moscow in Russian First League.

== Career statistics ==
As of match played 21 November 2025

Appearances and goals by club, season and competition
Club	Season	League			Cup		Europe		Other		Total	
Club	Season	Division	Apps	Goals	Apps	Goals	Apps	Goals	Apps	Goals	Apps	Goals
Spartak-2 Moscow	2013–14	Russian Second League	27	2	—		—		—		27	2
Spartak-2 Moscow	2014–15	Russian Second League	29	5	—		—		—		29	5
Spartak-2 Moscow	2015–16	Russian First League	34	5	—		—		3 (Note: Appearances in the FNL Cup)	1	37	6
Spartak-2 Moscow	2016–17	Russian First League	30	2	—		—		4	0	34	2
Spartak-2 Moscow	Total		120	14	—		—		7	1	127	15
Spartak Moscow	2016–17	Russian Premier League	0	0	0	0	0	0	—		0	0
SKA-Khabarovsk	2017–18	Russian Premier League	18	1	1	0	—		—		19	1
Anzhi Makhachkala	2018–19	Russian Premier League	14	0	1	0	—		—		15	0
Yenisey Krasnoyarsk	2018–19	Russian Premier League	8	0	—		—		—		8	0
Yenisey Krasnoyarsk	2019–20	Russian First League	25	4	2	1	—		3	0	30	5
Yenisey Krasnoyarsk	Total		33	4	2	1	—		3	0	38	5
Chayka	2020–21	Russian First League	35	6	1	0	—		—		36	6
Akron Tolyatti	2021–22	Russian First League	32	1	1	0	—		—		33	1
Akron Tolyatti	2022–23	Russian First League	30	4	7	1	—		—		37	5
Akron Tolyatti	2023–24	Russian First League	33	3	3	1	—		2 (Note: Appearances in the promotion play-offs)	0	38	4
Akron Tolyatti	2024–25	Russian Premier League	26	1	1	0	—		—		27	1
Akron Tolyatti	2025–26	Russian Premier League	8	0	6	0	–		–		14	0
Akron Tolyatti	Total		129	9	18	2	0	0	2	0	149	11
Career total			349	34	23	3	0	0	12	1	384	38
