= Mohammed Rabiu =

Ghanaian footballer (born 1989)

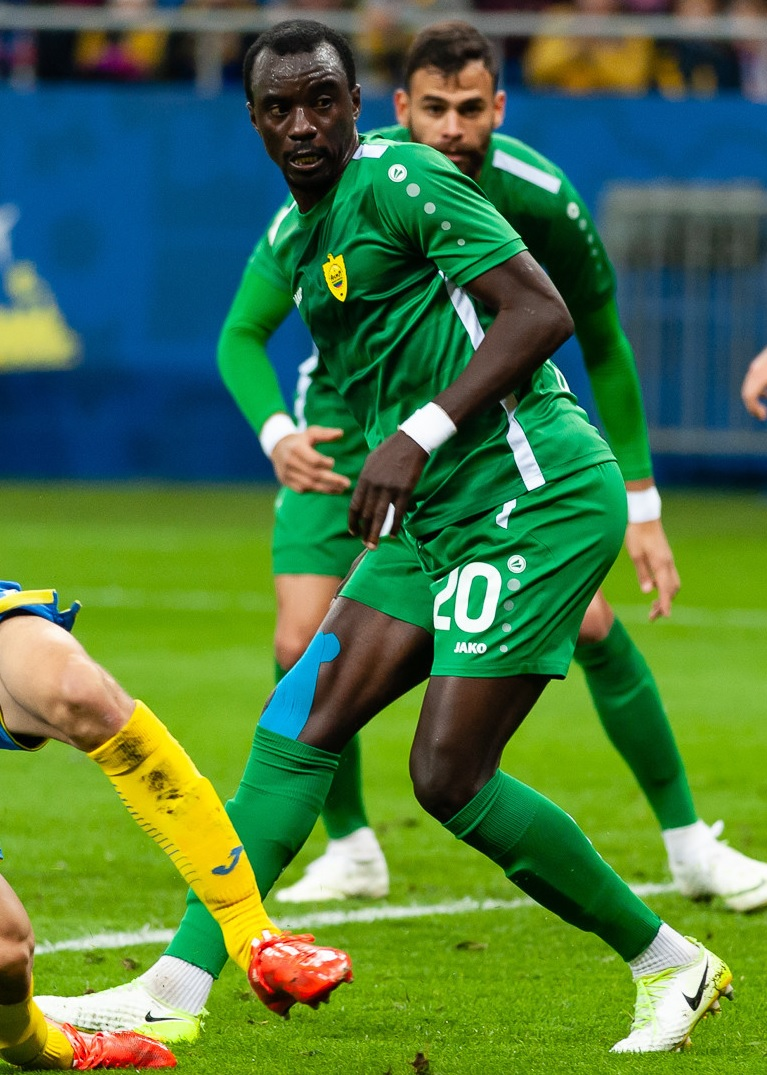
- Rabiu with Anzhi Makhachkala in 2018

Personal information
- Full name: Mohammed Rabiu Al-Hassan
- Date of birth: 31 December 1989 (age 36)
- Place of birth: Accra, Greater Accra, Ghana
- Height: 1.86 m (6 ft 1 in)
- Position: Defensive midfielder

Youth career
- –2010: Liberty
- 2009–2010: → Sampdoria (loan)
- 2010: → Udinese (loan)

Senior career*
| Years | Team | Apps | (Gls) |
| 2008–2011 | Liberty | | |
| 2008 | → Gimnàstic (loan) | 2 | (0) |
| 2008–2009 | → Xerez (loan) | 1 | (0) |
| 2010–2011 | → Evian (loan) | 10 | (0) |
| 2011–2013 | Evian | 53 | (2) |
| 2013–2016 | Kuban Krasnodar | 51 | (1) |
| 2016 | Anzhi Makhachkala | 0 | (0) |
| 2018–2019 | Anzhi Makhachkala | 11 | (0) |
| 2019 | Krylia Sovetov | 9 | (0) |
| 2019–2020 | Paris FC | 14 | (1) |
| 2020 | FC Tambov | 2 | (0) |

International career
| 2009 | Ghana U20 | 9 | (2) |
| 2011–2015 | Ghana | 31 | (0) |
- * Club domestic league appearances and goals

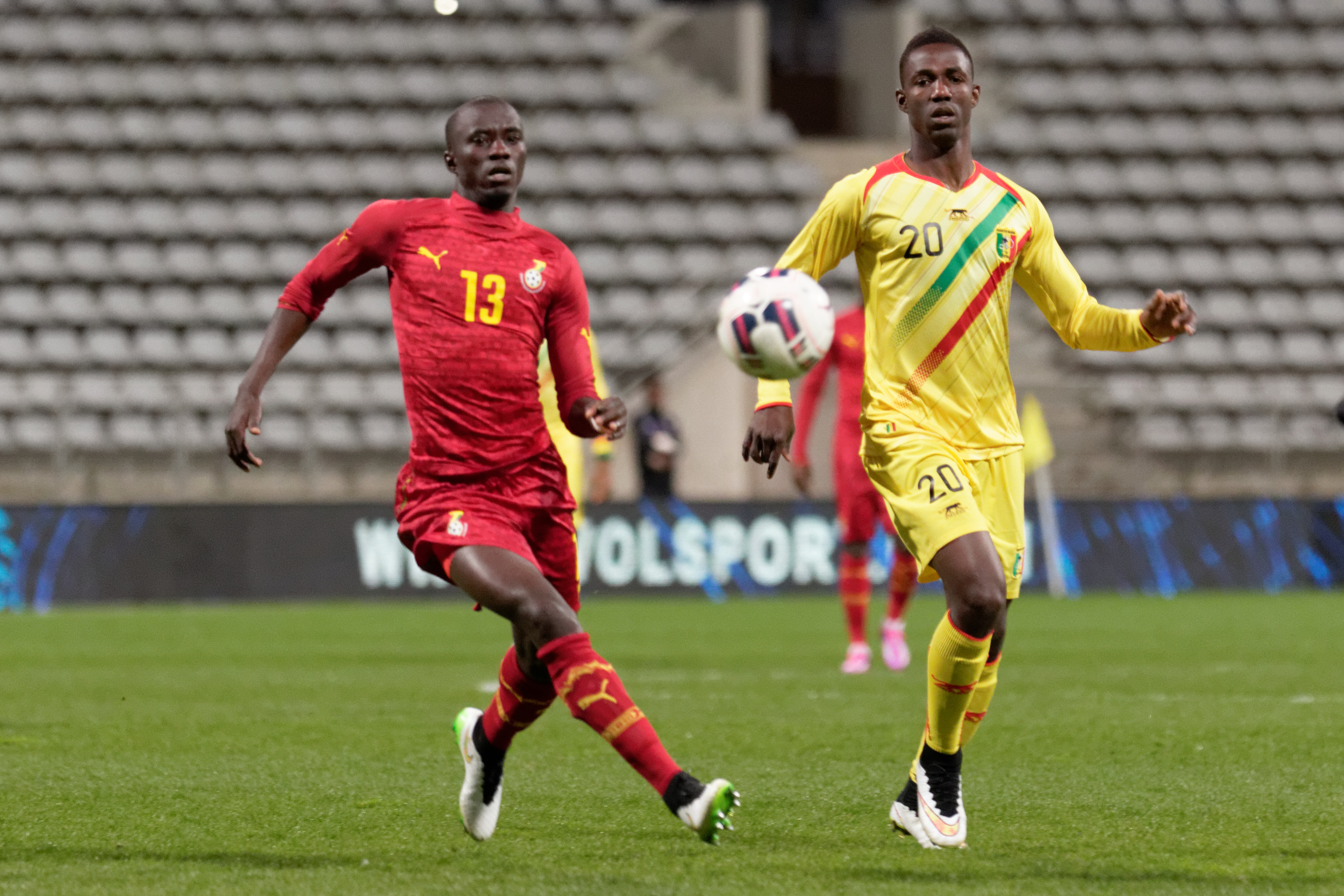
Rabiu playing for Ghana in a match against Mali in 2015

Mohammed Rabiu Al-Hassan (Arabic: محمد رابيو الحسن; born 31 December 1989), simply known as Mohammed Rabiu (/moʊˈhæməd ræˈbiːjuː/ moh-HAM-əd rab-EE-yoo), is a Ghanaian former professional footballer who played as a defensive midfielder. He has earned over 30 caps for the Ghana national team.

== Club career ==
=== Early career ===
Rabiu signed by Gimnàstic on 31 January 2008 from Liberty, at age 18, the minimum age for international transfer. He played his first game on 18 May 2008 against Sevilla Atlético, but left after 6 months and moved to Xerez CD. There, he played his first game on 11 November 2008 against CD Tenerife. On 7 August 2009. U.C. Sampdoria signed the Ghanaian midfielder on loan from Liberty Professionals FC, the powerful half-back will be part of Sampdoria's youth team. After a season, he joined Serie A outfit Udinese Calcio, as the club borrowed the registration quota from Sampdoria.

=== Évian FC ===
On 4 August 2010, he trained at Évian Thonon Gaillard for a possible loan, which was confirmed on late August. He made his debut at 17 October 2010, playing 10 games throughout the season On 28 June 2011, Évian achieved promotion to Ligue 1 in the 2010–11 season, and completed a five-year permanent deal for Rabiu, for a €1M fee.

=== Kuban Krasnodar ===
On 22 August 2013, Rabiu signed a three-year deal with Kuban Krasnodar, for a reported €2.6M fee.

=== FC Anzhi Makhachkala ===
On 16 August 2016, he signed a 3.5-year contract with FC Anzhi Makhachkala. He didn't play any games for Anzhi in the first half of the 2016–17 season as he was recovering from injury. On 30 December 2016, Anzhi removed him from their Russian Premier League roster. On 6 February 2017, another Russian club FC Dynamo Moscow confirmed that they are considering inviting Rabiu for a tryout. On 9 February 2017, his agent said Rabiu is still recovering from injury and will not go on Dynamo tryout, and he still might return to Anzhi for the rest of the 2016–17 season. The registration deadline for the 2016–17 season passed on 24 February 2017 without Rabiu getting re-registered for Anzhi.

On 23 July 2018, FC Anzhi Makhachkala announced that they had re-signed Rabiu after his recovery from injury.

=== After Anzhi Makhachkala ===
On 23 February 2019, Krylia Sovetov announced the signing of Rabiu. On 7 July 2019, Krylia Sovetov announced that Rabiu left the team due to health problems.

On 21 August 2019, he returned to France, signing a one-season contract with Paris FC.

On 9 October 2020, he signed with Russian Premier League club FC Tambov.

== International career ==
Rabiu represented the Black Satellites on international level, he played with the team in the qualifications for the 2009 African Youth Championship in Rwanda. In 2008, he was called up to the Black Stars squad for the 2008 African Cup of Nations in Ghana.

=== International appearances ===
Ghana national team
| Year | Apps | Goals |
| 2011 | 1 | 0 |
| 2012 | 1 | 0 |
| 2013 | 13 | 0 |
| 2014 | 11 | 0 |
| 2015 | 5 | 0 |
| Total | 31 | 0 |

== Titles and honours ==
=== Club ===
Évian

- Ligue 2: 2010–11

=== International ===
Ghana U-20

- FIFA U-20 World Cup: 2009
