= Ivan Ivanchenko =

Russian footballer

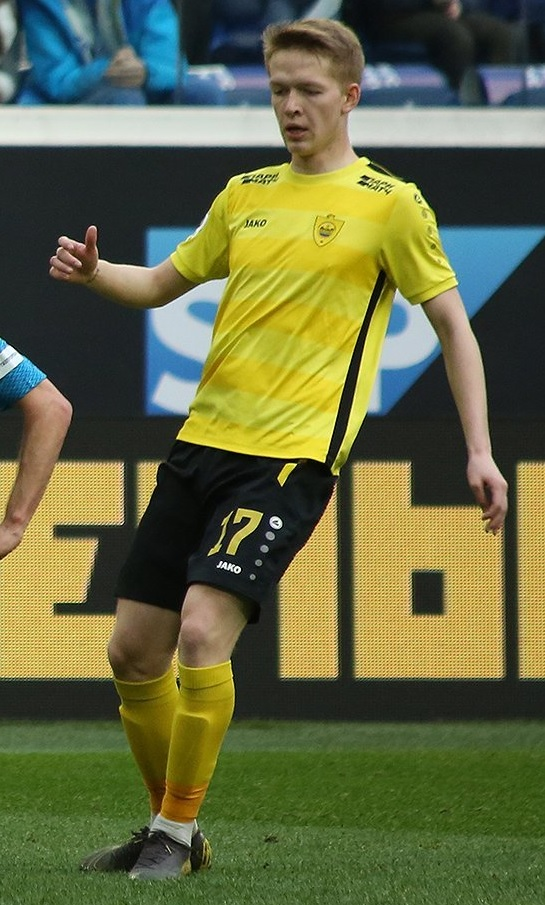
- Ivanchenko with Anzhi in 2019

Personal information
- Full name: Ivan Dmitriyevich Ivanchenko
- Date of birth: 7 September 1998 (age 28)
- Place of birth: Perm, Russia
- Height: 1.86 m (6 ft 1 in)
- Positions: Midfielder; forward

Senior career*
Years	Team	Apps	(Gls)
2015	FC Amkar Perm	0	(0)
2015–2016	FC Lada-Togliatti	14	(2)
2016	FC Zenit-2 Saint Petersburg	2	(0)
2017–2019	FC Anzhi Makhachkala	12	(0)
2018	→ FC Anzhi-2 Makhachkala	3	(0)
2018	→ FC Zvezda Perm (loan)	10	(0)
2019	FC Armavir	16	(1)
2020–2021	FC Rodina Moscow	2	(0)
2021	FC Amkar Perm	0	(0)
2022	FC Yessentuki	13	(4)
2022–2023	FC Kolomna	32	(5)
2023	SC Astrakhan	9	(0)
- * Club domestic league appearances and goals as of 25 November 2023

Ivan Dmitriyevich Ivanchenko (Russian: Иван Дмитриевич Иванченко; born 7 September 1998) is a Russian football player who plays as a midfielder.

== Club career ==
He made his debut in the Russian Professional Football League for FC Lada-Togliatti on 3 September 2015 in a game against FC Volga Ulyanovsk.

He made his Russian Premier League debut for FC Anzhi Makhachkala on 26 November 2017 in a game against FC Rostov.

== Career statistics ==
=== Club ===
As of 27 May 2018

Club	Season	League			Cup		Continental		Total	
Club	Season	Division	Apps	Goals	Apps	Goals	Apps	Goals	Apps	Goals
FC Amkar Perm	2014–15	Russian Premier League	0	0	0	0	–		0	0
FC Amkar Perm	2015–16	Russian Premier League	0	0	–		–		0	0
FC Amkar Perm	Total		0	0	0	0	0	0	0	0
FC Lada Togliatti	2015–16	PFL	14	2	–		–		14	2
FC Zenit-2 Saint Petersburg	2016–17	FNL	2	0	–		–		2	0
FC Zenit Saint Petersburg	2016–17	Russian Premier League	0	0	0	0	0	0	0	0
FC Anzhi Makhachkala	2016–17	Russian Premier League	0	0	0	0	–		0	0
FC Anzhi Makhachkala	2017–18	Russian Premier League	3	0	0	0	–		3	0
FC Anzhi Makhachkala	Total		3	0	0	0	0	0	3	0
FC Anzhi-2 Makhachkala	2017–18	PFL	3	0	–		–		3	0
Career total			22	2	0	0	0	0	22	2
