= Magomed Elmurzayev =

Russian football player

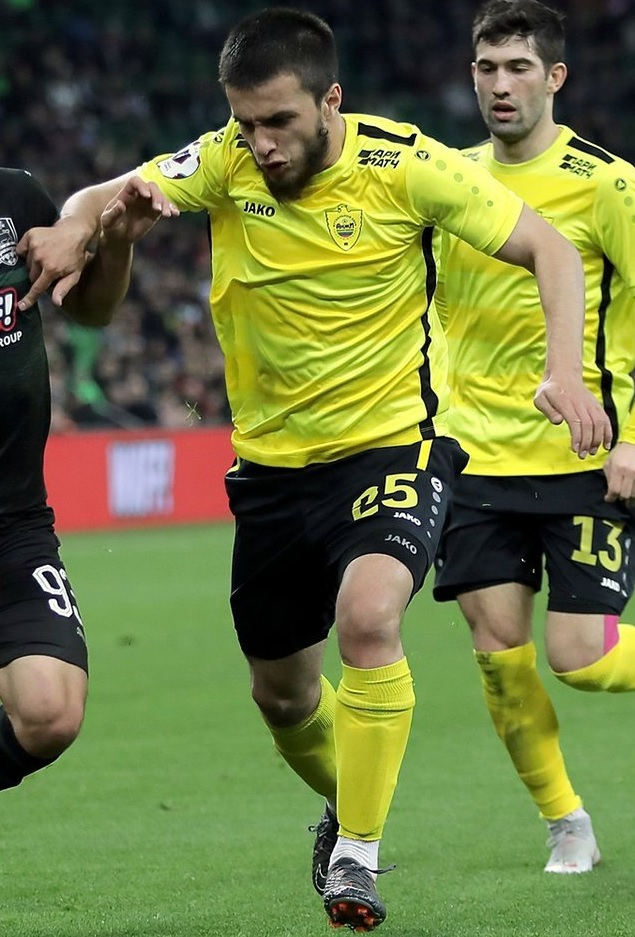
- Elmurzayev with Anzhi Makhachkala in 2019

Personal information
- Full name: Magomed Vakhayevich Elmurzayev
- Date of birth: 16 June 1997 (age 29)
- Place of birth: Solnechnoye, Russia
- Height: 1.75 m (5 ft 9 in)
- Position: Left-back

Senior career*
Years	Team	Apps	(Gls)
2015–2019	FC Anzhi Makhachkala	7	(0)
2017–2018	→ FC Anzhi-2 Makhachkala	14	(5)
2019–2020	FC SKA-Khabarovsk	20	(1)
2023–2024	FC Pobeda Khasavyurt	43	(4)
- * Club domestic league appearances and goals as of 16 November 2024

Magomed Vakhayevich Elmurzayev (Russian: Магомед Вахаевич Эльмурзаев; born 16 June 1997) is a Russian football player who plays as a left back.

== Club career ==
He made his debut in the Russian Professional Football League for FC Anzhi-2 Makhachkala on 19 July 2017 in a game against FC Chernomorets Novorossiysk.

He made his debut for the main squad of FC Anzhi Makhachkala on 20 September 2017 in a Russian Cup game against FC Luch-Energiya Vladivostok.

He made his Russian Premier League debut for Anzhi on 5 November 2017 in a game against FC Amkar Perm.

On 25 June 2019, he signed with FC SKA-Khabarovsk.

== Career statistics ==
=== Club ===
As of 20 May 2018

Club	Season	League			Cup		Continental		Total	
Club	Season	Division	Apps	Goals	Apps	Goals	Apps	Goals	Apps	Goals
FC Anzhi Makhachkala	2015–16	Russian Premier League	0	0	0	0	–		0	0
FC Anzhi Makhachkala	2016–17	Russian Premier League	0	0	0	0	–		0	0
FC Anzhi Makhachkala	2017–18	Russian Premier League	3	0	1	0	–		4	0
FC Anzhi Makhachkala	Total		3	0	1	0	0	0	4	0
FC Anzhi-2 Makhachkala	2017–18	PFL	14	5	–		–		14	5
Career total			17	5	1	0	0	0	18	5
