= FC Legion Makhachkala =

Russian football club

- Full name: Football Club Legion Makhachkala
- Founded: 2015
- Dissolved: 2025
- League: Russian Second League, Division B, Group 4
- 2025: 11th
- Website: fc-legion.ru
Home colours	Away colours

FC Legion Makhachkala (Russian: «Легион» (Махачкала)) was a Russian football team from Makhachkala. It was founded in 2015 as FC Legion Makhachkala and participated in local amateur competitions. Before the 2016–17 season, it was renamed to Legion-Dynamo and licensed to play in the third-tier Russian Professional Football League. As FC Dynamo Makhachkala was resurrected, the team was renamed back to FC Legion Makhachkala in July 2022. In late 2025, the club was bought by a new owner Vadim Galitsky, relocated to Nizhny Novgorod and renamed to Pobeda.
