= 2016–17 FC Tom Tomsk season =

Tom Tomsk
2016–17 season
- Chairman: Sergei Zhvachkin
- Manager: Valery Petrakov
- Stadium: Trud Stadium
- Premier League: 16th
- Russian Cup: Round of 32 vs Sibir Novosibirsk
- Top goalscorer: League: Aleksei Pugin (4); All: Aleksei Pugin (4)
Home colours	Away colours

The 2016–17 FC Tom Tomsk season was the club's first season back in the Russian Premier League, the highest tier of football in Russia, since their relegation at the end of the 2013–14 season. Tomsk finished the season bottom of the RPL, being relegated back to the FNL, and reached the Russian Cup Round of 32 where they were defeated by Sibir Novosibirsk in extra time.

== Squad ==
As of 27 January 2017, according to the official website Archived 2016-07-28 at the Wayback Machine. Note: Flags indicate national team as defined under FIFA eligibility rules; some limited exceptions apply. Players may hold more than one non-FIFA nationality.

No.	Pos.	Nation	Player
1	GK	RUS	Aleksey Solosin
7	MF	RUS	Pavel Golyshev
10	MF	RUS	Sergey Kuznetsov
15	MF	RUS	Yevgeni Balyaikin
17	MF	RUS	Aleksey Pugin
18	MF	RUS	Artem Popov
42	GK	RUS	Aleksandr Melikhov
74	MF	RUS	Anton Makurin

No.	Pos.	Nation	Player
84	DF	RUS	Anton Miterev
87	FW	RUS	Dmitri Sasin
89	DF	RUS	Dmitri Osipov
92	MF	MDA	Valeriu Ciupercă (on loan from Anzhi)
96	DF	RUS	Aleksandr Bukachyov
97	FW	RUS	Aleksandr Sobolev
98	MF	RUS	Nikita Gvineysky

=== Out on loan ===
Note: Flags indicate national team as defined under FIFA eligibility rules; some limited exceptions apply. Players may hold more than one non-FIFA nationality.

No.	Pos.	Nation	Player
21	DF	BLR	Maksim Bardachow (at Orenburg)

=== Reserves ===
Note: Flags indicate national team as defined under FIFA eligibility rules; some limited exceptions apply. Players may hold more than one non-FIFA nationality.

No.	Pos.	Nation	Player
39	FW	RUS	Maksim Rykov
41	MF	RUS	Andrei Zorin
45	MF	RUS	Andrei Ogaryov
49	DF	RUS	Dmitri Bablyuk
50	DF	RUS	Eduard Karymov
51	DF	RUS	Maksim Bobrov
52	DF	RUS	Aleksandr Andreyev
53	MF	RUS	Konstantin Antipov
54	FW	RUS	Dmitri Layev
55	FW	RUS	Denis Fomchenko
56	MF	RUS	Vladimir Lyskov
57	MF	RUS	Kirill Ilyin
58	MF	RUS	Nikolai Zarubin
59	FW	RUS	Daniil Kononenko

No.	Pos.	Nation	Player
60	GK	RUS	Konstantin Olifirenko
61	DF	RUS	Nikolai Rybin
62	GK	RUS	Danil Pshenichnikov
63	GK	RUS	Nikita Zubchikhin
64	MF	RUS	Mark Borisov
65	MF	RUS	Ruslan Salakhutdinov
69	DF	RUS	Mark Karymov
70	MF	RUS	Maksim Antukh
71	DF	RUS	Yegor Chernyshov
80	MF	RUS	Renat Fayzulin
88	MF	RUS	Daniil Bolshunov
91	MF	RUS	Daniil Kuzmin
94	MF	RUS	Aleksandr Naumenko

== Transfers ==
=== Summer ===
In: Note: Flags indicate national team as defined under FIFA eligibility rules; some limited exceptions apply. Players may hold more than one non-FIFA nationality.

No.	Pos.	Nation	Player
2	DF	RUS	Aleksandr Zhirov (from (Russia) Anzhi Makhachkala)
3	DF	RUS	Vitali Dyakov (on loan from (Russia) Dynamo Moscow)
4	DF	CRO	Ante Puljić (from (Belgium) Gent)
5	MF	ROU	Eric Bicfalvi (from (Romania) Dinamo București)
6	MF	CZE	Lukáš Droppa (from (Romania) Pandurii Târgu Jiu)
8	MF	UKR	Kyrylo Kovalchuk (from (Turkey) Karşıyaka)
9	DF	RUS	Kirill Kombarov (from (Russia) Spartak Moscow)
11	FW	UKR	Oleksandr Kasyan (from (Russia) Fakel Voronezh)
14	DF	RUS	Aslan Dudiyev (from (Russia) Mordovia Saransk)
18	MF	RUS	Artyom Popov (from (Russia) Zenit St. Petersburg)
19	DF	RUS	Pyotr Ten (from (Russia) CSKA Moscow, previously on loan)
20	DF	CZE	David Jablonský (from (Czech Republic) Teplice)
22	FW	RUS	Sergey Samodin (from (Russia) Mordovia Saransk)
23	DF	BIH	Ognjen Vranješ (from (Spain) Sporting de Gijón)
39	FW	RUS	Maksim Rykov
41	MF	RUS	Andrei Zorin (from (Russia) Baikal Irkutsk)
42	GK	RUS	Aleksandr Melikhov
45	MF	RUS	Andrei Ogaryov
48	DF	RUS	Maksim Tishkin (from (Russia) Mordovia Saransk)
49	DF	RUS	Dmitri Bablyuk
60	GK	RUS	Konstantin Olifirenko (from (Russia) Tom-2 Tomsk)
63	GK	RUS	Nikita Zubchikhin
65	MF	RUS	Ruslan Salakhutdinov (from (Russia) Tom-2 Tomsk)
69	DF	RUS	Mark Karymov
70	MF	RUS	Maksim Antukh
71	DF	RUS	Yegor Chernyshov
77	GK	RUS	Anton Kochenkov (on loan from (Russia) Lokomotiv Moscow)
78	FW	RUS	Pavel Kudryashov (from (Russia) Tom-2 Tomsk)
80	MF	RUS	Renat Fayzulin
84	DF	RUS	Anton Miterev (from (Russia) Tom-2 Tomsk)
87	FW	RUS	Dmitri Sasin (from (Russia) Tom-2 Tomsk)
88	MF	RUS	Daniil Bolshunov (from (Russia) Yakutiya Yakutsk)
89	DF	RUS	Dmitri Osipov (from (Russia) Sibir-2 Novosibirsk)
91	MF	RUS	Daniil Kuzmin
94	MF	RUS	Aleksandr Naumenko
96	DF	RUS	Aleksandr Bukachyov (from (Russia) Tom-2 Tomsk)
97	FW	RUS	Aleksandr Sobolev (from (Russia) Dynamo Barnaul)
98	MF	RUS	Nikita Gvineysky

Out: Note: Flags indicate national team as defined under FIFA eligibility rules; some limited exceptions apply. Players may hold more than one non-FIFA nationality.

No.	Pos.	Nation	Player
3	DF	RUS	Daniil Chalov (to (Russia) Mordovia Saransk)
4	MF	RUS	Yevgeni Bashkirov (to (Russia) Krylia Sovetov Samara)
5	MF	RUS	Pyotr Nemov
7	DF	RUS	Ivan Temnikov (to (Russia) Dynamo Moscow)
10	FW	RUS	Anzor Sanaya (to (Russia) Orenburg)
12	DF	RUS	Mikhail Bashilov (to (Lithuania) Utenis Utena)
13	MF	BLR	Pavel Nyakhaychyk (to (Russia) Orenburg)
14	MF	RUS	Aleksandr Cherevko (to (Russia) SKA-Khabarovsk)
23	DF	RUS	Georgi Dzhioyev
24	MF	RUS	Andrei Lyakh
25	DF	CZE	Martin Jiránek (to (Czech Republic) Příbram)
26	DF	RUS	Sergei Bendz (to (Russia) Kuban Krasnodar)
31	DF	RUS	Vitali Shakhov (end of loan from (Russia) Fakel Voronezh)
32	FW	RUS	Nikita Bazhenov
55	GK	RUS	Aleksandr Krivoruchko (end of loan from (Russia) Anzhi Makhachkala)
73	MF	RUS	Andrei Dyrdin
77	GK	UKR	Oleh Chuvayev (to (Ukraine) Zorya Luhansk)
93	MF	RUS	Albert Sharipov (end of loan from (Russia) Rubin Kazan)
—	DF	RUS	Artyom Yarmolitsky (released, previously on loan to (Armenia) Mika)

=== Winter ===
In: Note: Flags indicate national team as defined under FIFA eligibility rules; some limited exceptions apply. Players may hold more than one non-FIFA nationality.

No.	Pos.	Nation	Player
50	DF	RUS	Eduard Karymov
51	DF	RUS	Maksim Bobrov
52	DF	RUS	Aleksandr Andreyev
53	MF	RUS	Konstantin Antipov
54	FW	RUS	Dmitri Layev
55	FW	RUS	Denis Fomchenko
56	MF	RUS	Vladimir Lyskov
57	MF	RUS	Kirill Ilyin
58	MF	RUS	Nikolai Zarubin
59	FW	RUS	Daniil Kononenko
61	DF	RUS	Nikolai Rybin
62	GK	RUS	Danil Pshenichnikov
64	MF	RUS	Mark Borisov

Out: Note: Flags indicate national team as defined under FIFA eligibility rules; some limited exceptions apply. Players may hold more than one non-FIFA nationality.

No.	Pos.	Nation	Player
2	DF	RUS	Aleksandr Zhirov (to (Russia) Krasnodar)
3	DF	RUS	Vitali Dyakov (end of loan from (Russia) Dynamo Moscow)
5	MF	ROU	Eric Bicfalvi (to (Russia) Ural Yekaterinburg)
6	MF	CZE	Lukáš Droppa (to (Turkey) Bandırmaspor)
7	FW	RUS	Pavel Golyshev
8	MF	UKR	Kyrylo Kovalchuk (to (Kazakhstan) Ordabasy)
9	DF	RUS	Kirill Kombarov (to (Russia) Arsenal Tula)
11	FW	UKR	Oleksandr Kasyan (to (Russia) Fakel Voronezh)
14	DF	RUS	Aslan Dudiyev (to (Russia) Anzhi Makhachkala)
19	DF	RUS	Pyotr Ten (to (Russia) Yenisey Krasnoyarsk)
20	DF	CZE	David Jablonský (to (Bulgaria) Levski Sofia)
21	DF	BLR	Maksim Bardachow (on loan to (Russia) Orenburg)
22	FW	RUS	Sergey Samodin (to (Russia) Yenisey Krasnoyarsk)
23	DF	BIH	Ognjen Vranješ (to (Greece) AEK)
48	DF	RUS	Maksim Tishkin (to (Russia) Baltika Kaliningrad)
77	GK	RUS	Anton Kochenkov (end of loan from (Russia) Lokomotiv Moscow)
78	FW	RUS	Pavel Kudryashov (to (Russia) Krylia Sovetov Samara)
99	FW	RUS	Kirill Pogrebnyak (to (Russia) Zenit-2 St. Petersburg)

== Competitions ==
=== Premier League ===
==== Results by round ====
Round	1	2	3	4	5	6	7	8	9	10	11	12	13	14	15	16	17	18	19	20	21	22	23	24	25	26	27	28	29	30
Ground	A	A	H	A	H	A	H	A	H	A	H	A	H	A	A	H	A	H	A	H	A	H	H	H	A	H	A	H	H	H
Result	L	D	W	L	L	L	W	L	D	L	L	L	L	D	L	L	L	L	L	W	L	D	L	L	D	L	L	L	L	L
Position	15	14	9	11	12	14	10	12	12	13	14	15	15	14	15	15	16	16	16	16	16	16	16	16	16	16	16	16	16	16

Updated to match(es) played on 21 May 2017. Source: See Results
A = Away; H = Home; W = Win; D = Draw; L = Loss

==== Results ====
1 August 2016 1	Krasnodar	3 – 0	Tom Tomsk	Krasnodar
23:30 KRAT (UTC+7)	Ari (yellow card) 20' (goal) 57'; Smolov 44', 60'	Summary	Kombarov (yellow card) 50'; Tishkin (yellow card) 61'; Ciupercă (yellow card) 90' (yellow-red card) 90+2'	Stadium: Kuban Stadium; Attendance: 7,198; Referee: Igor Fedotov

7 August 2016 2	Lokomotiv Moscow	2 – 2	Tom Tomsk	Moscow
23:00 KRAT (UTC+7)	Škuletić 13' (pen.); Samedov 33' (pen.)	Summary	Jablonský (yellow card) 12'; Tishkin (yellow card) 22'; Samodin (yellow card) 72'; Bicfalvi 76'; Pugin 85'; Balyaikin (yellow card) 87'	Stadium: Lokomotiv Stadium; Attendance: 8,103; Referee: Sergey Ivanov

14 August 2016 3	Tom Tomsk	1 – 0	Ufa	Tomsk
19:30 KRAT (UTC+7)	Samodin 9'; Puljić (yellow card) 54'; Ciupercă (yellow card) 69'	Summary	Stotsky (yellow card) 42'; Bezdenezhnykh (yellow card) 53'	Stadium: Trud Stadium; Attendance: 6,873; Referee: Sergey Lapochkin

21 August 2016 4	Rostov	3 – 0	Tom Tomsk	Rostov-on-Don
01:30 KRAT (UTC+7)	Novoseltsev 17'; Ezatolahi 45'; Kudryashov (yellow card) 49'; Yerokhin 52'; Bayramyan (yellow card) 90+2'	Summary	Ciupercă (yellow card) 45+1'; Ten (yellow card) 66'; Jablonský (yellow card) 90'	Stadium: Olimp-2; Attendance: 7,971; Referee: Aleksandr Egorov

27 August 2016 5	Tom Tomsk	0 – 1	CSKA Moscow	Tomsk
19:30 KRAT (UTC+7)	Tishkin (yellow card) 72'; Popov (yellow card) 80'; Pugin (red card) 90+3'	Summary	Eremenko 54'; Shchennikov (yellow card) 67'; Dzagoev (yellow card) 77'	Stadium: Trud Stadium; Attendance: 8.250; Referee: Mikhail Vilkov

10 September 2016 6	Amkar Perm	1 – 0	Tom Tomsk	Perm
19:30 KRAT (UTC+7)	Idowu (yellow card) 42'; Salugin 47'; Bodul (yellow card) 51'	Summary	Vranješ (yellow card) 53'	Stadium: Zvezda Stadium; Attendance: 6,500; Referee: Evgeny Turbin

17 September 2016 7	Tom Tomsk	1 – 0	Arsenal Tula	Tomsk
18:00 KRAT (UTC+7)	Dyakov 25'	Summary	Aydov (yellow card) 55'; Gorbatyuk (yellow card) 56'; Berkhamov (yellow card) 68'	Stadium: Trud Stadium; Attendance: 4,250; Referee: Igor Fedotov

26 September 2016 8	Rubin Kazan	2 – 1	Tom Tomsk	Kazan
23:30 KRAT (UTC+7)	Jonathas 26'; Kambolov (yellow card) 75' (goal) 79'	Summary	Bicfalvi (yellow card) 19'; Vranješ 49'	Stadium: Central Stadium; Attendance: 4,463; Referee: Sergey Lapochkin

1 October 2016 9	Tom Tomsk	1 – 1	Ural Yekaterinburg	Tomsk
16:00 KRAT (UTC+7)	Pugin 23'; Vranješ (yellow card) 55'; Droppa (yellow card) 77'	Summary	Fontanello 45'; Chanturia (yellow card) 51'; Yemelyanov (yellow card) 90'	Stadium: Trud Stadium; Attendance: 2,950; Referee: Vitaly Meshkov

16 October 2016 10	Orenburg	3 – 1	Tom Tomsk	Orenburg
20:30 KRAT (UTC+7)	Nyakhaychyk 12', 42', 90+2'; Pomerko (yellow card) 76'	Summary	Vranješ (yellow card) 41'; Bicfalvi 77'; Solosin (yellow card) 90+1'	Stadium: Gazovik Stadium; Attendance: 4,416; Referee: Roman Galimov

22 October 2016 11	Tom Tomsk	0 – 3	Anzhi Makhachkala	Tomsk
16:00 KRAT (UTC+7)	Vranješ (yellow card) 36'; Droppa (yellow card) 60'	Summary	Mayewski (yellow card) 45'; Iličević (yellow card) 49' (goal) 66', 77'; Berisha 82'	Stadium: Trud Stadium; Attendance: 2,100; Referee: Vladimir Seldyakov

30 October 2016 12	Zenit St.Petersburg	1 – 0	Tom Tomsk	Saint Petersburg
21:00 KRAT (UTC+7)	Kokorin 26'; Witsel (yellow card) 49'; Criscito (yellow card) 67'; Yusupov (yellow card) 90+2'	Summary	Popov (yellow card) 15'; Dyakov (yellow card) 49'; Droppa (yellow card) 60'; Kudryashov (yellow card) 89'	Stadium: Petrovsky Stadium; Attendance: 17,000; Referee: Vitaly Meshkov

5 November 2016 13	Tom Tomsk	0 – 1	Spartak Moscow	Tomsk
15:00 KRAT (UTC+7)	Balyaikin (yellow card) 50'; Droppa (yellow card) 63'	Summary	Fernando 42'; Popov (yellow card) 83'	Stadium: Trud Stadium; Attendance: 5,400; Referee: Aleksandr Egorov

21 November 2016 14	Terek Grozny	0 – 0	Tom Tomsk	Grozny
23:00 KRAT (UTC+7)		Summary	Kovalchuk (yellow card) 32'; Kasyan (yellow card) 36'; Dudiyev (yellow card) 53'; Samodin (yellow card) 90+3'	Stadium: Akhmat-Arena; Attendance: 11,200; Referee: Evgeny Turbin

27 November 2016 15	Krylia Sovetov	3 – 0	Tom Tomsk	Samara
18:00 KRAT (UTC+7)	Kornilenko 10'; Mollo 69', 78'; Bashkirov (yellow card) 73'	Summary	Kochenkov (red card) 26'; Balyaikin (yellow card) 37'	Stadium: Metallurg Stadium; Attendance: 2,036; Referee: Sergey Karasev

1 December 2016 16	Tom Tomsk	1 – 6	Lokomotiv Moscow	Tomsk
23:30 KRAT (UTC+7)	Bardachow (yellow card) 23'; Bicfalvi 48'; Kasyan (yellow card) 52' (yellow-red card) 62'	Summary	Guilherme (yellow card) 23'; Kolomeytsev 51', 82'; Fernandes 67'; Denisov 71'; Maicon 76'; Ignatyev 79'	Stadium: Trud Stadium; Attendance: 5,218; Referee: Roman Galimov

5 December 2016 17	Ufa	1 – 0	Tom Tomsk	Ufa
17:00 KRAT (UTC+7)	Sysuyev (yellow card) 35'; Zaseyev (yellow card) 59'; Sukhov 64'	Summary	Sobolev (yellow card) 13'; Zhirov (yellow card) 41'; Kombarov (yellow card) 71'; Balyaikin (yellow card) 90'; Dudiyev (red card) 90'	Stadium: Neftyanik Stadium; Attendance: 3,152; Referee: Aleksei Matyunin

3 March 2017 18	Tom Tomsk	0 – 6	Rostov	Rostov-on-Don
23:00 KRAT (UTC+7)	Gvineysky (yellow card) 39'	Summary	Bukharov 19', 45+1'; Kudryashov (yellow card) 42'; Dević 69'; Yerokhin 78'; Azmoun 80', 90+1'	Stadium: Olimp-2; Attendance: 8,283; Referee: Aleksey Sukhoy

11 March 2017 19	CSKA Moscow	4 – 0	Tom Tomsk	Moscow
20:30 KRAT (UTC+7)	Vitinho 1'; Dzagoev (yellow card) 19'; Ionov 44', 61'	Summary	Ciupercă (yellow card) 22'	Stadium: VEB Arena; Attendance: 11,000; Referee: Kirill Levnikov

18 March 2017 20	Tom Tomsk	1 – 0	Amkar Perm	Tomsk
15:30 KRAT (UTC+7)	Kuznetsov 24'; Osipov (yellow card) 35'; Pugin (yellow card) 37'; Popov (yellow card) 49'	Summary	Gol (yellow card) 46'; Condé (yellow card) 61'; Zaytsev (yellow card) 78'; Idowu (yellow card) 84'; Bodul (yellow card) 90+1'	Stadium: Trud Stadium; Attendance: 2,600; Referee: Timur Arslanbekov

1 April 2017 21	Arsenal Tula	3 – 0	Tom Tomsk	Tula
21:30 KRAT (UTC+7)	Aleksandrov 19'; Doumbia (yellow card) 62' (goal) 74'; Bourceanu (yellow card) 83'; Kombarov 89'; Adzhoyev (yellow card) 90+1'	Summary	Osipov (yellow card) 23'; Sasin (yellow card) 31'; Balyaikin (yellow card) 73'; Karymov (yellow card) 80'	Stadium: Arsenal Stadium; Attendance: 10,100; Referee: Vladimir Moskalyov

10 April 2017 22	Tom Tomsk	2 – 2	Rubin Kazan	Tomsk
19:00 KRAT (UTC+7)	Osipov (yellow card) 8'; Pugin 13'; Sasin (yellow card) 36'; Sobolev 83'	Summary	Lestienne (yellow card) 37' (goal) 47' (pen.), 79'	Stadium: Trud Stadium; Attendance: 3,200; Referee: Artem Chistyakov

16 April 2017 23	Ural Yekaterinburg	1 – 0	Tom Tomsk	Yekaterinburg
19:00 KRAT (UTC+7)	Dantsev (yellow card) 34'; Bicfalvi 40'	Summary	Sasin (yellow card) 87'; Makurin (yellow card) 89'	Stadium: SKB-Bank Arena; Attendance: 3,017; Referee: Aleksei Matyunin

23 April 2017 24	Tom Tomsk	1 – 2	Orenburg	Tomsk
16:00 KRAT (UTC+7)	Pugin 36'; Makurin (yellow card) 39'	Summary	Drahun (yellow card) 8'; Oyewole 22'; Georgiev 73'	Stadium: Trud Stadium; Attendance: 2,500; Referee: Sergey Karasev

27 April 2017 25	Anzhi Makhachkala	3 – 3	Tom Tomsk	Kaspiysk
23:30 KRAT (UTC+7)	Khubulov 29' (pen.), 51' (pen.), 90+7' (pen.) (yellow card) 37'; Guliyev (yellow card) 63'	Summary	Sobolev 25' (yellow card) 47'; Golyshev (yellow card) 27'; Osipov (yellow card) 45+1'; Miterev (yellow card) 49'; Gvineysky 70'; Bukachyov (yellow card) 83'; Bolshunov 90+3'; Karymov (yellow card) 90+6'	Stadium: Anzhi Arena; Attendance: 3,520; Referee: Vladislav Bezborodov

1 May 2017 26	Tom Tomsk	0 – 2	Zenit St.Petersburg	Tomsk
17:00 KRAT (UTC+7)	Sobolev (yellow card) 31'	Summary	Criscito (yellow card) 31'; Shatov 35'; Danny 83' (yellow card) 84'	Stadium: Trud Stadium; Attendance: 6,958; Referee: Roman Galimov

6 May 2017 27	Spartak Moscow	1 – 0	Tom Tomsk	Moscow
23:00 KRAT (UTC+7)	Promes 15' (pen.)	Summary	Sobolev (yellow card) 29'; Gvineysky (yellow card) 30'; Miterev (yellow card) 33'	Stadium: Otkrytiye Arena; Attendance: 42,070; Referee: Aleksey Sukhoy

14 May 2017 28	Tom Tomsk	1 – 2	Terek Grozny	Tomsk
16:00 KRAT (UTC+7)	Popov (yellow card) 27'; Pugin (yellow card) 38'; Sasin (yellow card) 65'; Salakhutdinov 80'	Report	Torje (yellow card) 19'; Lebedenko 60'; Mbengue 62'; Ivanov (yellow card) 74'	Stadium: Trud Stadium; Attendance: 3,250; Referee: Aleksei Matyunin

17 May 2017 29	Tom Tomsk	0 – 2	Krylia Sovetov	Tomsk
19:00 KRAT (UTC+7)	Balyaikin (yellow card) 27'; Popov (yellow card) 41'; Ciupercă (yellow card) 71'	Report	Bruno 5'; Zotov (yellow card) 35'; Kornilenko 80'	Stadium: Trud Stadium; Attendance: 2,250; Referee: Sergey Lapochkin

21 May 2017 30	Tom Tomsk	1 – 5	Krasnodar	Tomsk
19:00 KRAT (UTC+7)	Gvineysky (yellow card) 32'; Salakhutdinov (yellow card) 42'; Sobolev 49' (pen.); Sasin (yellow card) 51'; Naumenko (yellow card) 69'	Report	Smolov 17', 26', 79'; Pereyra 33'; Naldo 71'	Stadium: Trud Stadium; Attendance: 3,300; Referee: Evgeny Turbin

==== League table ====
Pos	Team	Pld	W	D	L	GF	GA	GD	Pts	Qualification or relegation
12	Anzhi Makhachkala	30	7	9	14	24	38	−14	30 (Note: Anzhi Makhachkala ahead of Orenburg on head-to-head points; Orenburg–Anzhi Makhachkala 0–0, Anzhi Makhachkala–Orenburg 1–0.)	
13	Orenburg (R)	30	7	9	14	25	36	−11	30	Qualification for the Relegation play-offs
14	Arsenal Tula (O)	30	7	7	16	18	40	−22	28	Qualification for the Relegation play-offs
15	Krylia Sovetov Samara (R)	30	6	10	14	31	39	−8	28	Relegation to Football National League
16	Tom Tomsk (R)	30	3	5	22	17	64	−47	14	Relegation to Football National League

Source: Russian Premier League, Soccerway
Rules for classification: 1) Points; 2) Matches won; 3) Head-to-head points; 4) Head-to-head matches won; 5) Head-to-head goal difference; 6) Head-to-head goals scored; 7) Head-to-head away goals; 8) Goal difference; 9) Goals scored; 10) Away goals scored.
(O) Play-off winners; (R) Relegated

=== Russian Cup ===
21 September 2016 Round of 32	Sibir Novosibirsk	1 – 0 (a.e.t.)	Tom Tomsk	Novosibirsk
12:00 KRAT (UTC+7)	Tsygan (yellow card) 45'; Rukhaia (yellow card) 49'; Makarenko (yellow card) 98'; Kachan 118'	Summary	Kudryashov (yellow card) 34'; Ten (yellow card) 64'	Stadium: Spartak Stadium; Attendance: 3,100; Referee: Anton Anopa

== Squad statistics ==
As of Match played 21 May 2017

=== Appearances and goals ===
No.	Pos	Nat	Player	Total		Premier League		Russian Cup	
No.	Pos	Nat	Player	Apps	Goals	Apps	Goals	Apps	Goals
1	GK	(Russia) RUS	Aleksei Solosin	12	0	11+1	0	0	0
4	DF	(Croatia) CRO	Ante Puljić	10	0	10	0	0	0
7	FW	(Russia) RUS	Pavel Golyshev	17	0	16	0	1	0
10	MF	(Russia) RUS	Sergey Kuznetsov	6	1	3+2	1	1	0
15	MF	(Russia) RUS	Yevgeni Balyaikin	20	0	11+8	0	1	0
17	MF	(Russia) RUS	Aleksey Pugin	21	4	20+1	4	0	0
18	MF	(Russia) RUS	Artyom Popov	26	0	20+5	0	1	0
41	MF	(Russia) RUS	Andrei Zorin	1	0	0+1	0	0	0
42	GK	(Russia) RUS	Aleksandr Melikhov	7	0	7	0	0	0
65	MF	(Russia) RUS	Ruslan Salakhutdinov	6	1	2+4	1	0	0
69	DF	(Russia) RUS	Mark Karymov	10	0	7+3	0	0	0
71	DF	(Russia) RUS	Yegor Chernyshov	1	0	0	0	0+1	0
74	MF	(Russia) RUS	Anton Makurin	6	0	3+3	0	0	0
84	DF	(Russia) RUS	Anton Miterev	13	0	12+1	0	0	0
87	FW	(Russia) RUS	Dmitri Sasin	12	0	12	0	0	0
88	MF	(Russia) RUS	Daniil Bolshunov	10	1	2+8	1	0	0
89	DF	(Russia) RUS	Dmitri Osipov	10	0	8+2	0	0	0
92	MF	(Moldova) MDA	Valeriu Ciupercă	18	0	18	0	0	0
94	MF	(Russia) RUS	Aleksandr Naumenko	3	0	1+2	0	0	0
96	DF	(Russia) RUS	Aleksandr Bukachyov	7	0	2+5	0	0	0
97	FW	(Russia) RUS	Aleksandr Sobolev	13	3	13	3	0	0
98	MF	(Russia) RUS	Nikita Gvineysky	8	1	7+1	1	0	0
Players away from the club on loan:
21	DF	(Belarus) BLR	Maksim Bardachow	10	0	10	0	0	0
Players who left Tom Tomsk during the season:
2	DF	(Russia) RUS	Aleksandr Zhirov	11	0	11	0	0	0
3	DF	(Russia) RUS	Vitali Dyakov	14	1	14	1	0	0
4	DF	(Russia) RUS	Yevgeni Bashkirov	5	0	5	0	0	0
5	MF	(Romania) ROU	Eric Bicfalvi	15	3	14+1	3	0	0
6	MF	(Czech Republic) CZE	Lukáš Droppa	11	0	11	0	0	0
8	MF	(Ukraine) UKR	Kyrylo Kovalchuk	12	0	8+3	0	1	0
9	DF	(Russia) RUS	Kirill Kombarov	14	0	14	0	0	0
11	FW	(Ukraine) UKR	Oleksandr Kasyan	12	0	6+6	0	0	0
14	DF	(Russia) RUS	Aslan Dudiyev	9	0	6+2	0	1	0
19	DF	(Russia) RUS	Pyotr Ten	5	0	3+1	0	1	0
20	DF	(Czech Republic) CZE	David Jablonský	7	0	5+1	0	1	0
22	FW	(Russia) RUS	Sergey Samodin	12	1	9+3	1	0	0
23	DF	(Bosnia and Herzegovina) BIH	Ognjen Vranješ	7	1	7	1	0	0
48	DF	(Russia) RUS	Maksim Tishkin	14	0	14	0	0	0
77	GK	(Russia) RUS	Anton Kochenkov	13	0	12	0	1	0
78	FW	(Russia) RUS	Pavel Kudryashov	8	0	0+7	0	1	0
99	FW	(Russia) RUS	Kirill Pogrebnyak	7	0	1+5	0	1	0

=== Goal scorers ===
Place	Position	Nation	Number	Name	Premier League	Russian Cup	Total
1	MF	(Russia)	17	Aleksei Pugin	4	0	4
2	MF	(Romania)	5	Eric Bicfalvi	3	0	3
2	FW	(Russia)	97	Aleksandr Sobolev	3	0	3
4	FW	(Russia)	22	Sergey Samodin	1	0	1
4	DF	(Russia)	3	Vitali Dyakov	1	0	1
4	DF	(Bosnia and Herzegovina)	23	Ognjen Vranješ	1	0	1
4	MF	(Russia)	10	Sergey Kuznetsov	1	0	1
4	MF	(Russia)	98	Nikita Gvineysky	1	0	1
4	MF	(Russia)	88	Daniil Bolshunov	1	0	1
4	MF	(Russia)	65	Ruslan Salakhutdinov	1	0	1
				TOTALS	17	0	17

=== Disciplinary record ===
Number	Nation	Position	Name	Premier League		Russian Cup		Total	
Number	Nation	Position	Name	Yellow card	Red card	Yellow card	Red card	Yellow card	Red card
1	(Russia)	GK	Aleksei Solosin	1	0	0	0	1	0
2	(Russia)	DF	Aleksandr Zhirov	1	0	0	0	1	0
3	(Russia)	DF	Vitali Dyakov	1	0	0	0	1	0
4	(Croatia)	DF	Ante Puljić	1	0	0	0	1	0
5	(Romania)	MF	Eric Bicfalvi	1	0	0	0	1	0
6	(Czech Republic)	MF	Lukáš Droppa	4	0	0	0	4	0
7	(Russia)	FW	Pavel Golyshev	1	0	0	0	1	0
9	(Russia)	DF	Kirill Kombarov	2	0	0	0	2	0
11	(Ukraine)	FW	Oleksandr Kasyan	2	1	0	0	2	1
14	(Russia)	DF	Aslan Dudiyev	1	0	0	0	1	0
15	(Russia)	MF	Yevgeni Balyaikin	6	0	0	0	6	0
17	(Russia)	MF	Aleksei Pugin	2	1	0	0	2	1
18	(Russia)	MF	Artyom Popov	5	0	0	0	5	0
19	(Russia)	DF	Pyotr Ten	1	0	1	0	2	0
20	(Czech Republic)	DF	David Jablonský	2	0	0	0	2	0
21	(Belarus)	DF	Maksim Bardachow	1	0	0	0	1	0
22	(Russia)	FW	Sergey Samodin	1	0	0	0	1	0
23	(Bosnia and Herzegovina)	DF	Ognjen Vranješ	4	0	0	0	4	0
48	(Russia)	DF	Maksim Tishkin	3	0	0	0	3	0
65	(Russia)	MF	Ruslan Salakhutdinov	1	0	0	0	1	0
69	(Russia)	DF	Mark Karymov	2	0	0	0	2	0
74	(Russia)	MF	Anton Makurin	2	0	0	0	2	0
77	(Russia)	GK	Anton Kochenkov	0	1	0	0	0	1
78	(Russia)	FW	Pavel Kudryashov	1	0	1	0	2	0
84	(Russia)	DF	Anton Miterev	2	0	0	0	2	0
87	(Russia)	FW	Dmitri Sasin	5	0	0	0	5	0
89	(Russia)	DF	Dmitri Osipov	4	0	0	0	4	0
92	(Moldova)	MF	Valeriu Ciupercă	6	1	0	0	6	1
94	(Russia)	MF	Aleksandr Naumenko	1	0	0	0	1	0
96	(Russia)	DF	Aleksandr Bukachyov	1	0	0	0	1	0
97	(Russia)	FW	Aleksandr Sobolev	4	0	0	0	4	0
98	(Russia)	MF	Nikita Gvineysky	3	0	0	0	3	0
			TOTALS	71	4	2	0	73	4
