= 2016–17 FC Anzhi Makhachkala season =

Anzhi Makhachkala
2016–17 season
- Chairman: Suleyman Kerimov
- Manager: Pavel Vrba (until 30 December); Aleksandr Grigoryan (from 5 January)
- Stadium: Anzhi-Arena
- Russian Premier League: 12th
- Russian Cup: Quarter-final (vs. Ufa)
- Top goalscorer: League: Arsen Khubulov (5); All: Pylyp Budkivskyi (6)
Home colours	Away colours

The 2016–17 FC Anzhi Makhachkala season was the club's second season back in the Russian Premier League, the highest tier of football in Russia, since their relegation at the end of the 2013–14 season. Anzhi finished the season in twelfth, narrowly avoiding a Relegation play-off thanks to their head-to-head record against FC Orenburg, whilst also reaching the Quarterfinals of the Russian Cup, where they were knocked out by FC Ufa.

== Season events ==
Pavel Vrba was appointed as the club's new manager on 30 June 2016, following the expiration of Ruslan Agalarov's contract on 31 May 2016.

On 28 December 2016, Suleyman Kerimov sold the club to Osman Kadiyev. Two days later Pavel Vrba left by mutual consent, with Aleksandr Grigoryan being appointed as the club's new manager on 5 January 2017.

== Squad ==
As of 24 February 2017, according to the RFPL official website Archived 2015-07-02 at the Wayback Machine

Note: Flags indicate national team as defined under FIFA eligibility rules; some limited exceptions apply. Players may hold more than one non-FIFA nationality.

No.	Pos.	Nation	Player
1	GK	RUS	David Yurchenko
2	DF	RUS	Guram Tetrashvili
4	DF	UKR	Maksym Bilyi
5	DF	RUS	Aleksandr Zhirov (on loan from Krasnodar)
6	MF	IRI	Saeid Ezatolahi (on loan from Rostov)
7	DF	RUS	Kamil Agalarov
8	MF	RUS	Arsen Khubulov
9	FW	RUS	Shamil Asildarov
10	MF	RUS	Adlan Katsayev (on loan from Akhmat Grozny)
14	DF	RUS	Aslan Dudiyev
15	MF	UKR	Dmytro Shcherbak
16	GK	RUS	Yury Shafinsky
17	MF	RUS	Svyatoslav Georgiyevsky
19	FW	RUS	Pavel Dolgov
21	MF	RUS	Maksim Batov
22	MF	UKR	Sergey Karetnik

No.	Pos.	Nation	Player
24	DF	RUS	Sergei Parshivlyuk
26	DF	BRA	Xandão
27	GK	RUS	Mehdi Jannatov
28	FW	UKR	Pylyp Budkivskyi (on loan from Shakhtar)
30	MF	RUS	Shamil Gasanov
37	MF	RUS	Batraz Khadartsev
45	DF	FRA	Thomas Phibel
57	DF	RUS	Magomed Musalov
77	MF	RUS	Ayaz Guliyev (on loan from Spartak Moscow)
85	GK	RUS	Aleksandr Filtsov (on loan from Rubin Kazan)
90	MF	RUS	Andrei Lyakh
91	FW	RUS	Pavel Yakovlev
92	DF	RUS	Sergei Bryzgalov
94	FW	CRC	Felicio Brown Forbes (on loan from Arsenal Tula)
99	FW	RUS	Aleksandr Prudnikov

=== On loan ===
Note: Flags indicate national team as defined under FIFA eligibility rules; some limited exceptions apply. Players may hold more than one non-FIFA nationality.

No.	Pos.	Nation	Player
—	DF	RUS	Georgi Tigiyev (loan to Spartak Moscow until 30 June 2017)
—	FW	RUS	Dzhamal Dibirgadzhiyev (loan to Fátima until 30 June 2017)
—	MF	MDA	Valeriu Ciupercă (loan to Tom Tomsk until 30 June 2017)

=== Youth squad ===
Note: Flags indicate national team as defined under FIFA eligibility rules; some limited exceptions apply. Players may hold more than one non-FIFA nationality.

No.	Pos.	Nation	Player
39	MF	RUS	Kamil Zakirov
43	DF	RUS	Dmitri Dontsov
44	DF	RUS	Bagautdin Rikmatullayev
49	MF	RUS	Yuri Kuzmin
52	FW	RUS	Arsanbeg Murtazaliyev
53	MF	RUS	Karim Girayev
54	FW	RUS	Gamid Agalarov
56	MF	RUS	Nikita Adamov
58	FW	RUS	Shamil Murtuzaliyev
59	DF	RUS	Mariz Saidov
61	DF	RUS	Anton Belov
62	FW	RUS	Shakhban Gaydarov
64	DF	RUS	Alikadi Saidov
65	DF	RUS	Rustam Isayev
66	MF	RUS	Amirkhan Temukov
67	MF	RUS	Alan Yarikbayev
68	DF	RUS	Roman Khodakovsky

No.	Pos.	Nation	Player
69	GK	RUS	Yegor Sedov
70	FW	RUS	Rashid Magomedov
72	FW	RUS	Ivan Ivanchenko
73	MF	RUS	Chingiz Agabalayev
76	MF	RUS	Gadzhi Adzhiyev
76	GK	RUS	Nikita Repin
78	GK	RUS	Dmitri Gerasimov
78	MF	RUS	Timur Patakhov
79	FW	RUS	Said Aliyev
80	MF	RUS	Tamerlan Ramazanov
81	DF	RUS	Rustam Machilov
86	MF	RUS	Suleyman Dzhabrailov
88	GK	RUS	Yuri Shleyev
95	DF	RUS	Magomed Elmurzayev
97	MF	RUS	Magomed Magomedov
98	MF	RUS	Zalimkhan Yusupov

== Transfers ==
=== Summer ===
In: Note: Flags indicate national team as defined under FIFA eligibility rules; some limited exceptions apply. Players may hold more than one non-FIFA nationality.

No.	Pos.	Nation	Player
1	GK	RUS	David Yurchenko (from (Russia) Ufa, previously on loan)
10	MF	CRO	Ivo Iličević (from (Germany) Hamburger SV)
13	MF	GHA	Mohammed Rabiu (from (Russia) Kuban Krasnodar)
15	MF	UKR	Dmytro Shcherbak (from (Russia) Kuban Krasnodar)
17	MF	RUS	Svyatoslav Georgiyevsky (from (Russia) Kuban Krasnodar)
21	DF	FRA	Cédric Yambéré (on loan from (France) Bordeaux)
22	MF	UKR	Sergey Karetnik (from (Russia) Kuban Krasnodar)
24	DF	RUS	Sergei Parshivlyuk (from (Russia) Spartak Moscow)
26	DF	BRA	Xandão (from (Russia) Kuban Krasnodar)
28	FW	UKR	Pylyp Budkivskyi (on loan from (Ukraine) Shakhtar Donetsk)
31	GK	RUS	Aleksandr Belenov (from (Russia) Kuban Krasnodar)
44	DF	RUS	Bagautdin Rikmatullayev
65	DF	RUS	Rustam Isayev
66	MF	RUS	Amirkhan Temukov
68	MF	RUS	Roman Khodakovsky
69	GK	RUS	Yegor Sedov (from own academy)
76	GK	RUS	Nikita Repin (from (Russia) Rotor Volgograd academy)
86	MF	RUS	Suleyman Dzhabrailov
91	MF	RUS	Pavel Yakovlev (from (Russia) Spartak Moscow)
98	MF	RUS	Zalimkhan Yusupov
99	MF	FRA	Gabriel Obertan (from (England) Newcastle United)
—	DF	ESP	Cala (loan from (Spain) Getafe)

Out: Note: Flags indicate national team as defined under FIFA eligibility rules; some limited exceptions apply. Players may hold more than one non-FIFA nationality.

No.	Pos.	Nation	Player
5	DF	RUS	Aleksandr Zhirov (to (Russia) Tom Tomsk)
27	GK	RUS	Mehdi Jannatov (on loan to (Russia) Baltika Kaliningrad)
55	GK	RUS	Yevgeny Pomazan (to (Russia) Kuban Krasnodar)
56	DF	RUS	Mikhail Reshetnyak
65	DF	RUS	Abubakar Ustarkhanov
68	MF	RUS	Goytemir Umarov
71	GK	RUS	Mukharbek Burayev
75	FW	RUS	Tagir Musalov
87	MF	RUS	Ilya Maksimov (to (Russia) Arsenal Tula)
96	FW	RUS	Dzhamal Dibirgadzhiyev (loan to (Portugal) Fátima)
99	FW	RUS	Islamnur Abdulavov (to (Russia) Ufa)
—	GK	RUS	Aleksandr Krivoruchko (to (Russia) SKA-Khabarovsk, previously on loan to (Russia) Tom Tomsk)
—	DF	ESP	Cala (loan return to (Spain) Getafe)
—	DF	RUS	Murad Kurbanov (released, previously on loan to (Russia) Khimik Dzerzhinsk)
—	DF	RUS	Yuri Udunyan (to (Russia) Legion-Dynamo Makhachkala, previously on loan to (Russia) Khimik Dzerzhinsk)
—	DF	RUS	Andrey Yeshchenko (to (Russia) Spartak Moscow, previously on loan to (Russia) Dynamo Moscow)

=== Winter ===
In: Note: Flags indicate national team as defined under FIFA eligibility rules; some limited exceptions apply. Players may hold more than one non-FIFA nationality.

No.	Pos.	Nation	Player
2	DF	RUS	Guram Tetrashvili (from (Russia) Tosno)
4	DF	UKR	Maksym Bilyi
5	DF	RUS	Aleksandr Zhirov (loan from (Russia) Krasnodar)
6	MF	IRI	Saeid Ezatolahi (on loan from (Russia) Rostov)
7	DF	RUS	Kamil Agalarov
8	MF	RUS	Arsen Khubulov (from (Russia) Kuban Krasnodar)
9	FW	RUS	Shamil Asildarov (from (Kazakhstan) Tobol)
10	MF	RUS	Adlan Katsayev (on loan from (Russia) Terek Grozny)
13	MF	RUS	Dmitri Kudryashov
14	DF	RUS	Aslan Dudiyev (from (Russia) Tom Tomsk)
19	FW	RUS	Pavel Dolgov (from (Russia) Zenit St.Petersburg)
21	DF	RUS	Maksim Batov (from (Russia) Rubin Kazan)
39	MF	RUS	Kamil Zakirov (from (Russia) Krasnodar)
45	DF	FRA	Thomas Phibel (from (Serbia) Red Star Belgrade)
52	FW	RUS	Arsanbeg Murtazaliyev (from (Russia) UOR Dagestan Kaspiysk)
54	FW	RUS	Gamid Agalarov (from own academy)
56	MF	RUS	Nikita Adamov
58	FW	RUS	Shamil Murtuzaliyev (from (Russia) Zenit St. Petersburg academy)
64	DF	RUS	Alikadi Saidov (from own academy)
72	FW	RUS	Ivan Ivanchenko (from (Russia) Zenit St. Petersburg)
76	MF	RUS	Gadzhi Adzhiyev (from (Russia) Dynamo Bryansk)
77	MF	RUS	Ayaz Guliyev (on loan from (Russia) Spartak Moscow)
78	GK	RUS	Dmitri Gerasimov (from (Russia) CSKA Moscow)
81	DF	RUS	Rustam Machilov (from own academy)
85	GK	RUS	Aleksandr Filtsov (on loan from (Russia) Rubin Kazan)
88	GK	RUS	Yuri Shleyev (from (Russia) Mashuk-KMV Pyatigorsk)
90	MF	RUS	Andrei Lyakh (free agent)
92	DF	RUS	Sergei Bryzgalov (from (Russia) Terek Grozny)
94	FW	CRC	Felicio Brown Forbes (on loan from (Russia) Arsenal Tula)
99	FW	RUS	Aleksandr Prudnikov (from (Russia) Orenburg)
—	GK	RUS	Mehdi Jannatov (end of loan to (Russia) Baltika Kaliningrad)

Out: Note: Flags indicate national team as defined under FIFA eligibility rules; some limited exceptions apply. Players may hold more than one non-FIFA nationality.

No.	Pos.	Nation	Player
3	DF	RUS	Ali Gadzhibekov (to (Russia) Krylia Sovetov)
4	DF	SRB	Darko Lazić (to (Turkey) Alanyaspor)
6	MF	ARM	Karlen Mkrtchyan
8	MF	NED	Lorenzo Ebecilio (to (Cyprus) APOEL)
10	MF	CRO	Ivo Iličević (to (Kazakhstan) Kairat)
13	MF	GHA	Mohammed Rabiu
14	MF	KOS	Bernard Berisha (to (Russia) Terek Grozny)
18	MF	BLR	Ivan Mayewski (to (Kazakhstan) Astana)
20	MF	NIG	Amadou Moutari (to (Hungary) Ferencvárosi)
21	DF	FRA	Cédric Yambéré (loan return to (France) Bordeaux)
25	DF	GHA	Jonathan Mensah (to (United States) Columbus Crew)
31	GK	RUS	Aleksandr Belenov (from (Russia) Ufa)
45	DF	RUS	Narula Dzharulayev
47	MF	RUS	Tamirlan Dzhamalutdinov
77	DF	RUS	Georgi Tigiyev (on loan to (Russia) Spartak Moscow)
88	MF	RUS	Anvar Gazimagomedov (to (Russia) Armavir)
94	FW	CIV	Yannick Boli (to (China) Dalian Yifang)
99	MF	FRA	Gabriel Obertan (to (England) Wigan Athletic)

Trialists: Note: Flags indicate national team as defined under FIFA eligibility rules; some limited exceptions apply. Players may hold more than one non-FIFA nationality.

No.	Pos.	Nation	Player
—	GK	RUS	Yuri Shleyev
—	DF	RUS	Kamil Agalarov
—	DF	RUS	Qvanzav Məhəmmədov
—	MF	RUS	Andrei Bezhonov
—	MF	RUS	Adlan Katsayev
—	MF	RUS	Butta Magomedov
—	MF	RUS	Shamil Mirzayev
—	MF	RUS	Sharif Mukhammad
—	MF	RUS	Ruslan Shauvkhalov
—	MF	RUS	Fedor Sheremetov
—	MF	UKR	Denys Dedechko
—	FW	RUS	Shamil Asildarov
—	FW	RUS	Tagir Musalov
—	FW	UKR	Oleksiy Antonov
—		RUS	Magomed Suleimanov
—		RUS	Shamil Murtuzaliev

== Friendlies ==
30 June 2016	Khimki	2–0	Anzhi Makhachkala	Khimki
18:00 MSK (UTC+3)		Summary	Kuzmichyov 34'; Petrusyov 90'

4 July 2016	Spartak-2 Moscow	3–2	Anzhi Makhachkala	Khimki
18:00 MSK (UTC+3)	Davydov 23', 86'; Sinodzuka 88'	Summary	Trialist 43'; Abdulavov 52'

16 July 2016	Anzhi Makhachkala	1–0	Charlton Athletic	Pinkafeld, Austria
19:00 MSK (UTC+3)	Lazić (yellow card) 29'; Trialist (yellow card) 50'; Tigiyev 90'	Summary	Harriott (yellow card) 7'	Stadium: Adeg-Meister Frost Arena

19 July 2016	Anzhi Makhachkala	2–1	Ettifaq	Gornja Radgona, Slovenia
19:00 MSK (UTC+3)	Budkivskyi 2', 26'	Summary	53' (pen.)

23 July 2016	Anzhi Makhachkala	0–0	Watford	Austria
16:00 MSK (UTC+3)	Dibirgadzhiyev (yellow card) 67'; Berisha (yellow card) 70'	Summary

18 January 2017	Pandurii Târgu Jiu	1–1	Anzhi Makhachkala	Belek, Turkey
17:30 MSK (UTC+3)	Goal	Summary	Katsayev 24'

22 January 2017	Aktobe	1–0	Anzhi Makhachkala	Belek, Turkey
17:30 MSK (UTC+3)	B.Baitana	Summary

2 February 2017	Botev Plovdiv	1–2	Anzhi Makhachkala	Belek, Turkey
16:00 MSK (UTC+3)	Stoyanov 75'	Summary	Budkivskyi 28'; Asildarov 33'

4 February 2017	Elazığspor	0–0	Anzhi Makhachkala	Belek, Turkey
17:30 MSK (UTC+3)		Summary

5 February 2017	Vardar	2–1	Anzhi Makhachkala	Belek, Turkey
17:30 MSK (UTC+3)	Goal	Summary	Georgiyevsky 47'

8 February 2017	Dukla Prague	2–1	Anzhi Makhachkala	Belek, Turkey
16:00 MSK (UTC+3)	Hanousek 80', 90+3' (pen.)	Summary	Katsayev 23' (pen.)

17 February 2017	Şagadam	0–2	Anzhi Makhachkala	Belek, Turkey
17:00 MSK (UTC+3)		Summary	Asildarov 3'; Bryzgalov 83'

20 February 2017	Kairat	0–1	Anzhi Makhachkala	Belek, Turkey
17:30 MSK (UTC+3)		Summary	Katsayev 41'

23 February 2017	Atyrau	1–0	Anzhi Makhachkala	Belek, Turkey
17:30 MSK (UTC+3)	72'	Summary

25 February 2017	Irtysh Pavlodar	3–2	Anzhi Makhachkala	Belek, Turkey
19:00 MSK (UTC+3)	S.Bando 44'; Fonseca 70'; Zivkovic 78'	Summary	Karetnik 14'; Budkivskyi 51'

== Competitions ==
=== Russian Premier League ===
==== Results by round ====
Round	1	2	3	4	5	6	7	8	9	10	11	12	13	14	15	16	17	18	19	20	21	22	23	24	25	26	27	28	29	30
Ground	H	A	H	A	H	A	A	H	A	H	A	H	A	H	A	H	A	H	A	H	H	A	H	A	H	A	H	A	H	A
Result	D	L	W	W	L	D	W	D	L	D	W	D	L	L	L	W	L	L	L	W	L	D	L	W	D	D	D	L	L	L
Position	11	13	10	6	8	8	6	7	8	8	8	8	9	10	10	10	11	11	11	11	12	12	12	12	12	12	11	12	12	12

Updated to match(es) played on 21 May 2017. Source: See results
A = Away; H = Home; W = Win; D = Draw; L = Loss

==== Results ====
30 July 2016 1	Anzhi Makhachkala	0–0	CSKA Moscow	Kaspiysk
20:00 MSK (UTC+3)	Boli (yellow card) 68'; Zhirov (yellow card) 82'	Summary		Stadium: Anzhi Arena; Attendance: 16,500; Referee: Vitaly Meshkov

7 August 2016 2	Amkar Perm	2–0	Anzhi Makhachkala	Perm
15:30 MSK (UTC+3)	Anene 31'; Gol (yellow card) 57'; Zaytsev 88' (yellow card) 89'	Summary	Zhirov (yellow card) 17' (yellow-red card) 64'; Lazić (yellow card) 34'; Musalov (yellow card) 81'	Stadium: Zvezda Stadium; Attendance: 8,800; Referee: Vladislav Bezborodov

14 August 2016 3	Anzhi Makhachkala	1–0	Arsenal Tula	Kaspiysk
20:00 MSK (UTC+3)	Yambéré (yellow card) 15'; Ebecilio (yellow card) 29'; Mayewski 45+2'; Berisha (yellow card) 82'; Budkivskyi (yellow card) 90'; Gadzhibekov (yellow card) 90+1'	Summary	Belyayev (yellow card) 58'; Denisov (yellow card) 79'	Stadium: Anzhi Arena; Attendance: 7,300; Referee: Aleksei Matyunin

19 August 2016 4	Rubin Kazan	1–2	Anzhi Makhachkala	Kazan
19:30 MSK (UTC+3)	Kanunnikov 34'	Summary	Budkivskyi 42'; Ebecilio 54'; Gadzhibekov (yellow card) 69'; Lazić (yellow card) 76'; Gasanov (yellow card) 90+3'	Stadium: Central Stadium; Attendance: 8,572; Referee: Aleksey Eskov

28 August 2016 5	Anzhi Makhachkala	0–2	Spartak Moscow	Kaspiysk
21:30 MSK (UTC+3)	Musalov (yellow card) 52'; Yambéré (yellow card) 57'; Lazić (yellow card) 62'; Mensah (yellow card) 85'	Summary	Ananidze 18'; Yeshchenko (yellow card) 37' (yellow-red card) 72'; Kutepov (yellow card) 65'; Fernando (yellow card) 68'; Promes 81'	Stadium: Anzhi Arena; Attendance: 14,300; Referee: Sergei Ivanov

10 September 2016 6	Orenburg	0–0	Anzhi Makhachkala	Orenburg
18:00 MSK (UTC+3)	Georgiev (yellow card) 61'; Oyewole (yellow card) 75'	Summary	Mensah (yellow card) 10'; Obertan (yellow card) 57'	Stadium: Gazovik Stadium; Attendance: 5,012; Referee: Artem Chistyakov

17 September 2016 7	Ural	0–1	Anzhi Makhachkala	Yekaterinburg
16:30 MSK (UTC+3)		Summary	Obertan 25'; Parshivlyuk (yellow card) 87'; Iličević (yellow card) 90+1'	Stadium: SKB-Bank Arena; Attendance: 4,800; Referee: Sergey Lapochkin

25 September 2016 8	Anzhi Makhachkala	2–2	Zenit St.Petersburg	Kaspiysk
19:30 MSK (UTC+3)	Berisha 28' (pen.) (yellow card) 87'; Gasanov (yellow card) 39'; Boli (yellow card) 61' (goal) 64'; Yambéré (yellow card) 74'	Summary	Dzyuba 6', 18'; García (yellow card) 72'; Zhirkov (yellow card) 90+2'	Stadium: Anzhi Arena; Attendance: 9,800; Referee: Aleksey Eskov

1 October 2016 9	Krylia Sovetov	2–1	Anzhi Makhachkala	Samara
14:30 MSK (UTC+3)	Mollo 18'; Tkachyov 45+1' (yellow card) 76'	Summary	Musalov (yellow card) 25'; Parshivlyuk (yellow card) 43'; Gasanov (yellow card) 80'; Lazić (yellow card) 90'; Berisha 90+1' (yellow card) 90+2'	Stadium: Metallurg Stadium; Attendance: 5,263; Referee: Evgeny Turbin

17 October 2016 10	Anzhi Makhachkala	0–0	Terek Grozny	Kaspiysk
19:30 MSK (UTC+3)	Xandão (yellow card) 57'	Summary	Píriz (yellow card) 22' (yellow-red card) 82'; Ángel (yellow card) 65'; Gorodov (yellow card) 90+2'	Stadium: Anzhi Arena; Attendance: 7,200; Referee: Aleksei Matyunin

22 October 2016 11	Tom Tomsk	0–3	Anzhi Makhachkala	Tomsk
12:00 MSK (UTC+3)	Vranješ (yellow card) 36'; Droppa (yellow card) 60'	Summary	Mayewski (yellow card) 45'; Iličević (yellow card) 49' (goal) 66', 77'; Berisha 82'	Stadium: Trud Stadium; Attendance: 2,100; Referee: Vladimir Seldyakov

30 October 2016 12	Anzhi Makhachkala	0–0	Krasnodar	Kaspiysk
18:30 MSK (UTC+3)	Xandão (yellow card) 55'; Obertan (yellow card) 90+2'	Summary	Kaboré (yellow card) 6' (yellow-red card) 17'; Izmailov (yellow card) 47'; Laborde (yellow card) 90+2'; Eboue (yellow card) 90+4'	Stadium: Anzhi Arena; Attendance: 7,203; Referee: Sergey Karasev

5 November 2016 13	Lokomotiv Moscow	4–0	Anzhi Makhachkala	Moscow
18:30 MSK (UTC+3)	Maicon 3', 4'; Fernandes 50'; Samedov 59' (pen.)	Summary		Stadium: Lokomotiv Stadium; Attendance: 8,014; Referee: Mikhail Vilkov

19 November 2016 14	Anzhi Makhachkala	0–1	Ufa	Kaspiysk
17:00 MSK (UTC+3)	Yakovlev (yellow card) 90'	Summary	Vaněk 63'; Sukhov (yellow card) 73'; Oblyakov (yellow card) 79'; Bezdenezhnykh (yellow card) 81'	Stadium: Anzhi Arena; Attendance: 3,700; Referee: Sergey Ivanov

27 November 2016 15	Rostov	2–0	Anzhi Makhachkala	Rostov-on-Don
16:30 MSK (UTC+3)	Azmoun 41'; Kalachev (yellow card) 45+1'; Gațcan 79' (red card) 80'	Summary	Obertan (yellow card) 37'; Xandão (yellow card) 64'	Stadium: Olimp-2; Attendance: 9,194; Referee: Igor Fedotov

1 December 2016 16	Anzhi Makhachkala	3–1	Amkar Perm	Kaspiysk
20:30 MSK (UTC+3)	Budkivskyi 43', 65'; Boli 49' (pen.); Musalov (yellow card) 75'; Gadzhibekov (yellow card) 84'	Summary	Bodul 25'; Gol (yellow card) 50'; Gigolayev (yellow card) 66'	Stadium: Anzhi Arena; Attendance: 2,100; Referee: Sergey Karasev

5 December 2016 17	Arsenal Tula	1–0	Anzhi Makhachkala	Tula
19:30 MSK (UTC+3)	Berkhamov (yellow card) 34'; Belyayev 70'; Levashov (yellow card) 90+2'	Summary	Budkivskyi (yellow card) 17'; Ebecilio (yellow card) 42'	Stadium: Arsenal Stadium; Attendance: 4,597; Referee: Aleksey Eskov

6 March 2017 18	Anzhi Makhachkala	0–1	Rubin Kazan	Kaspiysk
19:30 MSK (UTC+3)	Ezatolahi (yellow card) 27' (yellow-red card) 77'	Summary	Tkachuk (yellow card) 11'; Kanunnikov (yellow card) 23' (goal) 81'	Stadium: Anzhi Arena; Attendance: 4,950; Referee: Aleksey Eskov

12 March 2017 19	Spartak Moscow	1–0	Anzhi Makhachkala	Moscow
16:30 MSK (UTC+3)	Samedov 67'	Summary	Phibel (yellow card) 3'; Yakovlev (yellow card) 28'; Khubulov (yellow card) 47'; Tetrashvili (yellow card) 57'	Stadium: Otkrytiye Arena; Attendance: 34,456; Referee: Aleksandr Egorov

17 March 2017 20	Anzhi Makhachkala	1–0	Orenburg	Kaspiysk
18:00 MSK (UTC+3)	Asildarov (yellow card) 12'; Prudnikov 79' (yellow card) 80'	Summary	Sivakow (yellow card) 49'	Stadium: Anzhi Arena; Attendance: 7,100; Referee: Vladislav Bezborodov

31 March 2017 21	Anzhi Makhachkala	2–3	Ural	Kaspiysk
19:30 MSK (UTC+3)	Prudnikov 49'; Khubulov 53'; Phibel (yellow card) 83'	Summary	Ilyin 22'; Yemelyanov (yellow card) 34'; Dantsev (yellow card) 45+1'; Manucharyan (yellow card) 53' (goal) 88'; Gasanov 57' (o.g.); Bicfalvi (yellow card) 61'	Stadium: Anzhi Arena; Attendance: 3,950; Referee: Sergey Ivanov

8 April 2017 22	Zenit St.Petersburg	1–1	Anzhi Makhachkala	Saint Petersburg
19:00 MSK (UTC+3)	Lombaerts (red card) 50'; Hernani (yellow card) 59'; Kokorin 73'	Summary	Forbes (yellow card) 14'; Yakovlev 21'; Budkivskyi (yellow card) 39'; Guliyev (yellow card) 57'; Phibel (yellow card) 78'; Khubulov (yellow card) 82'; Ezatolahi (yellow card) 89'	Stadium: Krestovsky Stadium; Attendance: 17,620; Referee: Aleksey Sukhoy

15 April 2017 23	Anzhi Makhachkala	1–3	Krylia Sovetov	Kaspiysk
17:00 MSK (UTC+3)	Parshivlyuk (yellow card) 15'; Khubulov 89' (pen.)	Summary	Kornilenko 9'; Zotov 23'; Pasquato 64'; Bozhin (yellow card) 88'	Stadium: Anzhi Arena; Attendance: 4,500; Referee: Alexey Nikolaev

22 April 2017 24	Terek Grozny	0–1	Anzhi Makhachkala	Grozny
19:00 MSK (UTC+3)	Roshi (yellow card) 12'	Summary	Forbes 14' (yellow card) 52'; Dudiyev (yellow card) 30'; Yurchenko (yellow card) 90+4'; Katsayev (yellow card) 90+5'	Stadium: Akhmat-Arena; Attendance: 15,537; Referee: Roman Galimov

27 April 2017 26	Anzhi Makhachkala	3–3	Tom Tomsk	Kaspiysk
19:30 MSK (UTC+3)	Khubulov 29' (pen.), 51' (pen.), 90+7' (pen.) (yellow card) 37'; Guliyev (yellow card) 63'	Summary	Sobolev 25' (yellow card) 47'; Golyshev (yellow card) 27'; Osipov (yellow card) 45+1'; Miterev (yellow card) 49'; Gvineysky 70'; Bukachyov (yellow card) 83'; Bolshunov 90+3'; Karymov (yellow card) 90+6'	Stadium: Anzhi Arena; Attendance: 3,520; Referee: Vladislav Bezborodov

1 May 2017 26	Krasnodar	0–0	Anzhi Makhachkala	Krasnodar
18:00 MSK (UTC+3)	Pereyra (yellow card) 53'; Torbinski (yellow card) 82'	Summary	Guliyev (yellow card) 33'; Yakovlev (yellow card) 60'; Musalov (yellow card) 65'; Yurchenko (yellow card) 90+1'	Stadium: Krasnodar Stadium; Attendance: 27,658; Referee: Vladimir Seldyakov

8 May 2017 27	Anzhi Makhachkala	0–0	Lokomotiv Moscow	Kaspiysk
17:00 MSK (UTC+3)	Tetrashvili (yellow card) 14'	Summary	Barinov (yellow card) 81'; Denisov (yellow card) 87'; Ignatyev (yellow card) 90+2'	Stadium: Anzhi Arena; Attendance: 4,980; Referee: Sergey Lapochkin

14 May 2017 28	Ufa	2–1	Anzhi Makhachkala	Ufa
16:30 MSK (UTC+3)	Jokić (yellow card) 24'; Stotsky 39'; Fatai 90'	Report	Budkivskyi 41'	Stadium: Neftyanik Stadium; Attendance: 5,800; Referee: Evgeny Turbin

17 May 2017 29	Anzhi Makhachkala	1–2	Rostov	Kaspiysk
19:30 MSK (UTC+3)	Tetrashvili (yellow card) 31'; Prudnikov 78'; Budkivskyi (yellow card) 90+1'	Report	Bayramyan (yellow card) 58'; Azmoun 61'; Poloz 64'; Terentyev (yellow card) 90+2'	Stadium: Anzhi Arena; Attendance: 4,500; Referee: Alexey Nikolaev

21 May 2017 30	CSKA Moscow	4–0	Anzhi Makhachkala	Moscow
15:00 MSK (UTC+3)	Ignashevich 17'; Vitinho 24', 38'; Wernbloom (yellow card) 33'; Chalov 49'	Report	Guliyev (yellow card) 31'	Stadium: VEB Arena; Attendance: 16,523; Referee: Kirill Levnikov

==== League table ====
Pos	Team	Pld	W	D	L	GF	GA	GD	Pts	Qualification or relegation
10	Amkar Perm	30	8	11	11	25	29	−4	35	
11	Ural Yekaterinburg	30	8	6	16	24	44	−20	30	
12	Anzhi Makhachkala	30	7	9	14	24	38	−14	30 (Note: Anzhi Makhachkala ahead of Orenburg on head-to-head points; Orenburg–Anzhi Makhachkala 0–0, Anzhi Makhachkala–Orenburg 1–0.)	
13	Orenburg (R)	30	7	9	14	25	36	−11	30	Qualification for the Relegation play-offs
14	Arsenal Tula (O)	30	7	7	16	18	40	−22	28	Qualification for the Relegation play-offs

Source: Russian Premier League, Soccerway
Rules for classification: 1) Points; 2) Matches won; 3) Head-to-head points; 4) Head-to-head matches won; 5) Head-to-head goal difference; 6) Head-to-head goals scored; 7) Head-to-head away goals; 8) Goal difference; 9) Goals scored; 10) Away goals scored.
(O) Play-off winners; (R) Relegated

=== Russian Cup ===
21 September 2016 Round of 32	Mordovia Saransk	1–2	Anzhi Makhachkala	Saransk
18:30 MSK (UTC+3)	Ivanov (yellow card) 66'; Lukyanov 87'	Summary	Iličević 6'; Moutari 45+3'; Yurchenko (yellow card) 86'; Budkivskyi (yellow card) 90+2'	Stadium: Start Stadium; Attendance: 920; Referee: Oleg Sokolov

27 October 2016 Round of 16	Anzhi Makhachkala	4–0	Zenit St.Petersburg	Kaspiysk
18:00 MSK (UTC+3)	Gasanov 29'; Budkivskyi (yellow card) 31' (goal) 62', 70'; Berisha (yellow card) 36' (goal) 79'; Gadzhibekov (yellow card) 51' (red card) 89'; Mayewski (yellow card) 89'	Summary	Neto (yellow card) 36'; Kokorin (yellow card) 56'; Kerzhakov (red card) 58'; Zhirkov (yellow card) 67'; Giuliano (red card) 89'; Witsel (yellow card) 89'	Stadium: Anzhi Arena; Attendance: 6,100; Referee: Vladimir Moskalyov

1 March 2017 Quarterfinal	Ufa	1–0	Anzhi Makhachkala	Ufa
17:0 MSK (UTC+3)	Zaseyev (yellow card) 55' (goal) 66'; Igboun (yellow card) 57'; Stotsky (yellow card) 85'; Paurević (yellow card) 89'	Summary	Yakovlev (yellow card) 32'; Guliyev (yellow card) 79'	Stadium: Neftyanik Stadium; Attendance: 8,400

== Squad statistics ==
As of Match played 21 May 2017

=== Appearances and goals ===
No.	Pos	Nat	Player	Total		Premier League		Russian Cup	
No.	Pos	Nat	Player	Apps	Goals	Apps	Goals	Apps	Goals
1	GK	(Russia) RUS	David Yurchenko	16	0	13	0	3	0
2	DF	(Russia) RUS	Guram Tetrashvili	11	0	10	0	1	0
5	DF	(Russia) RUS	Aleksandr Zhirov	16	0	15	0	1	0
6	MF	(Iran) IRI	Saeid Ezatolahi	11	0	3+7	0	1	0
8	MF	(Russia) RUS	Arsen Khubulov	11	5	7+3	5	1	0
9	FW	(Russia) RUS	Shamil Asildarov	7	0	2+4	0	1	0
10	MF	(Russia) RUS	Adlan Katsayev	11	0	9+1	0	1	0
14	DF	(Russia) RUS	Aslan Dudiyev	3	0	1+2	0	0	0
15	MF	(Ukraine) UKR	Dmytro Shcherbak	1	0	1	0	0	0
17	MF	(Russia) RUS	Svyatoslav Georgiyevsky	11	0	7+3	0	1	0
19	FW	(Russia) RUS	Pavel Dolgov	6	0	2+3	0	0+1	0
21	DF	(Russia) RUS	Maksim Batov	2	0	1+1	0	0	0
24	DF	(Russia) RUS	Sergei Parshivlyuk	20	0	19	0	0+1	0
26	DF	(Brazil) BRA	Xandão	7	0	5	0	2	0
28	FW	(Ukraine) UKR	Pylyp Budkivskyi	31	6	21+8	4	2	2
30	MF	(Russia) RUS	Shamil Gasanov	21	1	17+2	0	2	1
37	MF	(Russia) RUS	Batraz Khadartsev	4	0	2+2	0	0	0
45	DF	(France) FRA	Thomas Phibel	14	0	13	0	1	0
57	DF	(Russia) RUS	Magomed Musalov	31	0	27+2	0	2	0
77	MF	(Russia) RUS	Ayaz Guliyev	12	0	10+1	0	0+1	0
91	MF	(Russia) RUS	Pavel Yakovlev	15	1	11+3	1	1	0
92	DF	(Russia) RUS	Sergei Bryzgalov	8	0	4+3	0	1	0
94	FW	(Costa Rica) CRC	Felicio Brown Forbes	5	1	4+1	1	0	0
99	FW	(Russia) RUS	Aleksandr Prudnikov	11	3	5+5	3	0+1	0
Players away from the club on loan:
77	DF	(Russia) RUS	Georgi Tigiyev	16	0	12+2	0	2	0
Players who appeared for Anzhi Makhachkala no longer at the club:
3	DF	(Russia) RUS	Ali Gadzhibekov	11	0	8+2	0	1	0
4	DF	(Serbia) SRB	Darko Lazić	11	0	11	0	0	0
6	MF	(Armenia) ARM	Karlen Mkrtchyan	2	0	1+1	0	0	0
8	MF	(Netherlands) NED	Lorenzo Ebecilio	14	1	9+4	1	1	0
10	MF	(Croatia) CRO	Ivo Iličević	14	3	10+2	2	2	1
14	MF	(Kosovo) KOS	Bernard Berisha	19	4	12+5	3	1+1	1
18	MF	(Belarus) BLR	Ivan Mayewski	16	1	13+1	1	1+1	0
20	MF	(Niger) NIG	Amadou Moutari	6	1	1+3	0	1+1	1
21	DF	(France) FRA	Cédric Yambéré	13	0	11+1	0	0+1	0
25	DF	(Ghana) GHA	Jonathan Mensah	13	0	6+5	0	2	0
31	GK	(Russia) RUS	Aleksandr Belenov	17	0	17	0	0	0
88	MF	(Russia) RUS	Anvar Gazimagomedov	7	0	1+5	0	1	0
94	FW	(Ivory Coast) CIV	Yannick Boli	11	2	4+7	2	0	0
99	MF	(France) FRA	Gabriel Obertan	9	1	6+2	1	0+1	0

=== Goal scorers ===
Place	Position	Nation	Number	Name	Russian Premier League	Russian Cup	Total
1	FW	(Ukraine)	28	Pylyp Budkivskyi	4	2	6
2	MF	(Russia)	8	Arsen Khubulov	5	0	5
3	FW	(Ivory Coast)	94	Yannick Boli	3	0	3
3	FW	(Russia)	99	Aleksandr Prudnikov	3	0	3
3	MF	(Croatia)	10	Ivo Iličević	2	1	3
3	MF	(Kosovo)	14	Bernard Berisha	2	1	3
7	MF	(Belarus)	18	Ivan Mayewski	1	0	1
7	MF	(Netherlands)	8	Lorenzo Ebecilio	1	0	1
7	MF	(France)	99	Gabriel Obertan	1	0	1
7	MF	(Russia)	91	Pavel Yakovlev	1	0	1
7	FW	(Costa Rica)	94	Felicio Brown Forbes	1	0	1
7	MF	(Niger)	20	Amadou Moutari	0	1	1
7	MF	(Russia)	30	Shamil Gasanov	0	1	1
				TOTALS	24	6	30

=== Disciplinary record ===
Number	Nation	Position	Name	Russian Premier League		Russian Cup		Total	
Number	Nation	Position	Name	Yellow card	Red card	Yellow card	Red card	Yellow card	Red card
1	(Russia)	GK	David Yurchenko	3	0	0	0	3	0
2	(Russia)	DF	Guram Tetrashvili	3	0	0	0	3	0
3	(Russia)	DF	Ali Gadzhibekov	3	0	1	1	4	1
4	(Serbia)	DF	Darko Lazić	4	0	0	0	4	0
5	(Russia)	DF	Aleksandr Zhirov	3	1	0	0	3	1
6	(Iran)	MF	Saeid Ezatolahi	3	1	0	0	3	1
8	(Netherlands)	MF	Lorenzo Ebecilio	2	0	0	0	2	0
8	(Russia)	MF	Arsen Khubulov	3	0	0	0	3	0
9	(Russia)	FW	Shamil Asildarov	1	0	0	0	1	0
10	(Russia)	MF	Adlan Katsayev	2	0	0	0	2	0
10	(Russia)	DF	Aslan Dudiyev	1	0	0	0	1	0
14	(Kosovo)	MF	Bernard Berisha	3	0	1	0	4	0
14	(Russia)	DF	Aslan Dudiyev	1	0	0	0	1	0
18	(Belarus)	MF	Ivan Mayewski	1	0	1	0	2	0
21	(France)	DF	Cédric Yambéré	3	0	0	0	3	0
24	(Russia)	DF	Sergei Parshivlyuk	3	0	0	0	3	0
25	(Ghana)	DF	Jonathan Mensah	2	0	0	0	2	0
26	(Brazil)	DF	Xandão	3	0	0	0	3	0
28	(Ukraine)	FW	Pylyp Budkivskyi	4	0	2	0	6	0
30	(Russia)	MF	Shamil Gasanov	3	0	0	0	3	0
45	(France)	DF	Thomas Phibel	3	0	0	0	3	0
57	(Russia)	DF	Magomed Musalov	5	0	0	0	5	0
77	(Russia)	MF	Ayaz Guliyev	4	0	1	0	5	0
91	(Russia)	MF	Pavel Yakovlev	5	0	1	0	6	0
94	(Ivory Coast)	FW	Yannick Boli	2	0	0	0	2	0
94	(Costa Rica)	FW	Felicio Brown Forbes	2	0	0	0	2	0
99	(France)	DF	Gabriel Obertan	3	0	0	0	3	0
99	(Russia)	FW	Aleksandr Prudnikov	1	0	0	0	1	0
			TOTALS	72	2	8	1	80	3
