= Osipov =

Osipov (Russian: Осипов), Osipova (feminine; Осипова), or Ossipoff is a Russian surname that is derived from the male given name Osip and literally means Osip's. Notable people with these surnames include:

- Afanasiy Osipov (1928–2017), Soviet painter and People's Artist of the RSFSR
- Alexei Osipov (born 1938), Russian Orthodox theologian and professor
- Alexander Osipov (1920–1945), Soviet aircraft pilot and Hero of the Soviet Union
- Eskandar Shura Ossipoff, Assyrian boxer in the 1948 Olympics
- Fyodor Osipov (1902–1989), Soviet army officer and Full Cavalier of the Order of Glory
- Gennady Osipov (born 1929), Soviet sociologist and academician
- Gennady Simeonovich Osipov (1948–2020), Russian scientist in artificial intelligence, professor
- Dmitri Osipov (disambiguation), several people
- Igor Osipov (born 1973), Russian naval officer
- Irina Osipova (born 1981), Russian basketball player
- Mariya Osipova (1908–1999), Soviet World War II partisan, Hero of the Soviet Union
- Maxim Osipov (disambiguation), several people
- Natalia Osipova (born 1985), Russian ballerina
- Nikolai Osipov (1901–1945), Russian balalaika virtuoso, conductor, pedagogue, and People's Artist
- N. P. Osipov (1751–1799), Russian writer, poet, and translator
- Taisiya Osipova (1984), Russian opposition activist
- Vasily Osipov (1917–1991), Soviet aircraft pilot and double Hero of the Soviet Union
- Vladimir Ossipoff (1907–1998), American architect best known for his works in Hawaii
- Vladimir Osipov (1938–2020), Russian writer and dissident
- Yelena Osipova (born 1945), Russian artist and activist
- Yury Osipov (born 1936), President of the Russian Academy of Sciences since 1991

== See also ==
- Osip, people carrying the name
