= Salakhutdinov =

Salakhutdinov is a surname. People associated with the name include:

- Ruslan Salakhutdinov
- Ruslan Salakhutdinov (footballer)
