= Dmitri Osipov =

Dmitri Osipov may refer to:

- Dmitri Osipov (footballer) (born 1996)
- Dmitri Osipov (ice hockey) (born 1979)
- Dmitri Osipov (manager) (1966–2025)
