= Bolshunov =

Bolshunov (masculine, Russian: Большунов) or Bolshunova (feminine, Russian: Большунова) is a Russian surname. Notable people with the surname include:

- Aleksandr Bolshunov (born 1996), Russian cross-country skier
- Daniil Bolshunov (born 1997), Russian football player
