= Osip =

- Gender: male

Origin
- Origin: Hebrew

Other names
- Related names: Iosif

Osip (Russian: Осип; Ukrainian: Осип), also spelled Ossip or Osyp, is a Russian and Ukrainian male given name, a variant of the name Joseph. Notable people with the name include:

- Osip Abdulov (1900–1953), Soviet actor
- Osip Aptekman, Russian revolutionary
- Ossip Bernstein (1882–1962), Ukrainian-French chess player
- Osip Bilchansky (1858–1879), Russian terrorist hanged for using a gun to resist arrest
- Osip Bodyansky (1808–1877), Russian Imperial Slavist of Ukrainian Cossack descent
- Osip Braz (1873–1936), Russian-Jewish realist painter
- Osip Brik, Russian writer and literary critic, a futurist
- Osip Dymov (writer), pseudonym for Yosif (Osip) Isidorovich Perelman (1878-1959), Russian writer
- Osip Gelfond (1868–1942), Russian physician and Marxist philosopher
- Osip Komissarov, hatter's apprentice famous for thwarting the assassination of Alexander II of Russia
- Osip Kozodavlev (1754–1819), Russian statesman, politician and Minister of the Interior
- Osyp Kurylas (1870–1951), Ukrainian painter
- Osyp Lebedowicz, American Magic: The Gathering player
- Osip Mikhailovich Lerner (1847–1907), also known as Y. Y. (Yosef Yehuda) Lerner, a 19th-century Russian Jewish intellectual, writer and critic
- Osyp Makovei (1867–1925), Ukrainian writer and translator
- Osip Mandelstam, Russian poet
- Osip Minor (1861–1932), Russian revolutionary and member of the Socialist-Revolutionary Party
- Osip Notovich, Russian author, journalist and publisher
- Osip Petrov (1806–1878), Russian operatic bass-baritone
- Osip Piatnitsky (1882–1938), Russian revolutionary
- Osip Senkovsky, Polish-Russian journalist
- Osip Sorokhtei (1890–1941), Ukrainian painter, graphic artist, caricaturist and art teacher
- Osip Startsev (17th century – not earlier than 1714), Russian architect
- Osyp Shpytko, Ukrainian and Brazilian writer
- Osip Ivanovich Somov (1815–1876), Russian mathematician
- Osyp Turiansky (1880–1933), Ukrainian writer
- Osip Yermansky (1867–1941), Russian economist

== See also ==
- oSIP, a free software library for VoIP applications implementing lower layers of Session Initiation Protocol (SIP)
- Osip Dymov, central fictional character in the classic Russian story "The Grasshopper" (1892) by Anton Chekhov
- Osipov / Osipova (feminine) / Ossipoff
