= Ramilyevich =

Ramilyevich is a middle name. People associated with the name include:

- Ruslan Ramilyevich Salakhutdinov
- Denis Ramilyevich Galimzyanov
- Radik Ramilyevich Yamlikhanov
- Ruslan Ramilyevich Salakhutdinov (footballer)
