= Valeriu Ciupercă =

Moldovan footballer

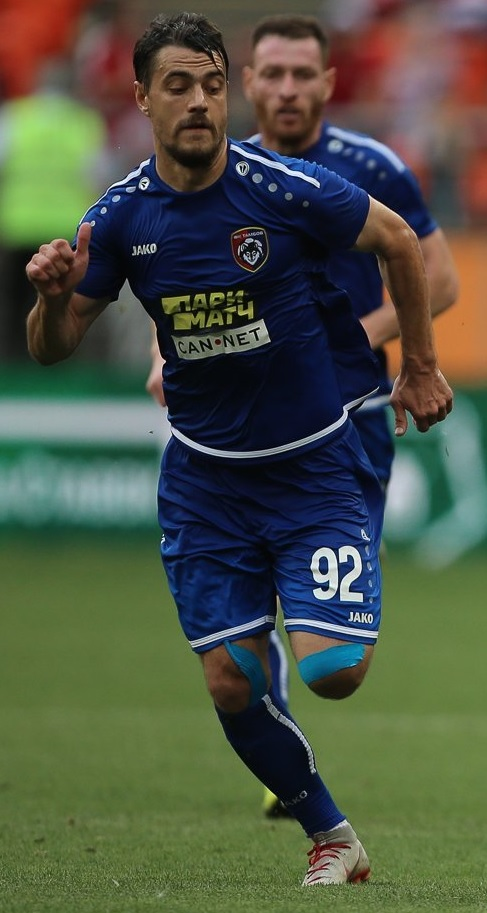
- Ciupercă with FC Tambov in 2019

Personal information
- Full name: Valeriu Nicolaevici Ciupercă
- Date of birth: 12 June 1992 (age 34)
- Place of birth: Tiraspol, Moldova
- Height: 1.77 m (5 ft 10 in)
- Position: Midfielder

Youth career
- Academia Chișinău

Senior career*
Years	Team	Apps	(Gls)
2009–2011	Academia Chișinău	67	(5)
2012–2014	Krasnodar	1	(0)
2012	→ Yenisey Krasnoyarsk (loan)	5	(0)
2013	→ Academia Chișinău (loan)	9	(3)
2013	→ Krasnodar-2	14	(2)
2014	→ Spartak Nalchik (loan)	11	(1)
2014–2017	Anzhi Makhachkala	20	(0)
2015–2017	→ Tom Tomsk (loan)	36	(0)
2017	Baltika Kaliningrad	12	(1)
2018	Rostov	1	(0)
2018–2020	Tambov	74	(6)
2021	Astana	24	(4)
2022	Kuban Krasnodar	4	(0)
2022–2023	Rubin Kazan	13	(0)
2023–2024	Kuban Krasnodar	17	(1)
2025	Dynamo Stavropol	28	(1)

International career
2011	Moldova U21	5	(0)
2011	Moldova	1	(0)
- * Club domestic league appearances and goals as of 12 August 2026

Valeriu Nicolaevici Ciupercă (born 12 June 1992) is a Moldovan former professional footballer who played as a midfielder.

== Career ==
He made his Russian Premier League debut for FC Krasnodar on 13 May 2012 in a game against PFC Spartak Nalchik.

On 2 July 2014, Ciupercă signed a three-year contract with Anzhi Makhachkala.

On 27 May 2016, he scored the decisive goal for FC Tom Tomsk in their promotion play-offs second-leg 2-0 victory against FC Kuban Krasnodar, securing Tom's promotion to the Russian Football Premier League.

On 10 January 2018, Ciupercă signed a two-and-a-half-year contract with FC Rostov. He was released from his Rostov contract by mutual consent on 4 July 2018.

On 13 July 2018, he signed a two-year contract with FC Tambov.

On 2 March 2021, Astana announced the signing of Ciupercă, with Ciupercă leaving Astana by mutual agreement on 30 December 2021.

On 17 March 2022, Ciupercă signed for Kuban Krasnodar in the Russian Football National League.

He gave up Moldovan Citizenship and playing for their national team not to considered Legionnaire in Russian League.

== Career statistics ==
=== Club ===
As of match played 30 October 2021

Appearances and goals by club, season and competition
Club	Season	League			National Cup		Continental		Other		Total	
Club	Season	Division	Apps	Goals	Apps	Goals	Apps	Goals	Apps	Goals	Apps	Goals
Academia Chișinău	2009–10	Moldovan National Division	23	0			—		—		23	0
Academia Chișinău	2010–11	Moldovan National Division	30	2			—		—		30	2
Academia Chișinău	2011–12	Moldovan National Division	14	3			—		—		14	3
Academia Chișinău	Total		67	5			-	-	-	-	67	5
Krasnodar	2011–12	Russian Premier League	1	0	0	0	—		—		1	0
Krasnodar	2012–13	Russian Premier League	0	0	0	0	—		—		0	0
Krasnodar	2013–14	Russian Premier League	0	0	0	0	—		—		0	0
Krasnodar	Total		1	0	0	0	-	-	-	-	1	0
Yenisey Krasnoyarsk (loan)	2012–13	Football National League	5	0	0	0	—		—		5	0
Academia Chișinău (loan)	2012–13	Moldovan National Division	9	3	0	0	—		—		9	3
Krasnodar-2	2013–14	Professional Football League	14	2	—		—		—		14	2
Spartak Nalchik (loan)	2013–14	Football National League	11	1	0	0	—		—		11	1
Anzhi Makhachkala	2014–15	Football National League	19	0	2	0	—		—		21	0
Anzhi Makhachkala	2015–16	Russian Premier League	0	0	0	0	—		0 (Note: Appearances and goals in the Russian Premier League Relegation Play Offs)	0	0	0
Anzhi Makhachkala	2015–16	Russian Premier League	0	0	0	0	—		—		0	0
Anzhi Makhachkala	Total		19	0	2	0	-	-	0	0	21	0
Tom Tomsk (loan)	2015–16	Football National League	17	0	1	0	—		2	1	20	1
Tom Tomsk (loan)	2016–17	Russian Premier League	18	0	0	0	—		—		18	0
Tom Tomsk (loan)	Total		35	0	1	0	-	-	2	1	38	1
Baltika Kaliningrad	2017–18	Football National League	12	1	0	0	—		—		12	1
Rostov	2017–18	Russian Premier League	1	0	0	0	—		—		1	0
Tambov	2018–19	Football National League	35	2	2	0	—		—		37	2
Tambov	2019–20	Russian Premier League	23	2	1	0	—		—		24	2
Tambov	2020–21	Russian Premier League	16	2	1	0	—		—		17	2
Tambov	Total		74	6	4	0	-	-	-	-	41	6
Astana	2021	Kazakhstan Premier League	24	4	4	0	4 (Note: Appearances in the UEFA Europa Conference League)	0	2 (Note: Appearances in the Kazakhstan Super Cup)	0	34	4
Career total			272	22	11	0	4	0	4	1	291	23

=== International ===
As of match played 10 August 2011

Appearances and goals by national team and year
National team	Year	Apps	Goals
Moldova	2011	1	0
Total		1	0
