= Anton Makurin =

Russian footballer

Personal information
- Full name: Anton Yuryevich Makurin
- Date of birth: 12 December 1994 (age 31)
- Place of birth: Tomsk, Russia
- Height: 1.82 m (6 ft 0 in)
- Position: Midfielder

Team information
- Current team: FC Sibir Novosibirsk
- Number: 21

Senior career*
Years	Team	Apps	(Gls)
2013–2019	FC Tom Tomsk	58	(2)
2014–2016	→ FC Tom-2 Tomsk (loan)	47	(7)
2019–	FC Sibir Novosibirsk	185	(18)
- * Club domestic league appearances and goals as of 15 November 2026

Anton Yuryevich Makurin (Russian: Антон Юрьевич Макурин; born 12 December 1994) is a Russian football player who plays for FC Sibir Novosibirsk.

== Career ==
He made his professional debut in the Russian Professional Football League for FC Tom-2 Tomsk on 19 July 2014 in a game against FC Yakutiya Yakutsk.

He made his Russian Premier League debut for FC Tom Tomsk on 11 March 2017 in a game against PFC CSKA Moscow.
