= Maxim Osipov =

Maxim Osipov may refer to:

- Maxim Osipov (writer), born 1963, Russian writer and cardiologist
- Maxim Osipov (ice hockey, born 1980), Russian professional ice hockey player
- Maxim Osipov (ice hockey, born 1993), Russian professional ice hockey player
