= Dmitri Sasin =

Russian footballer

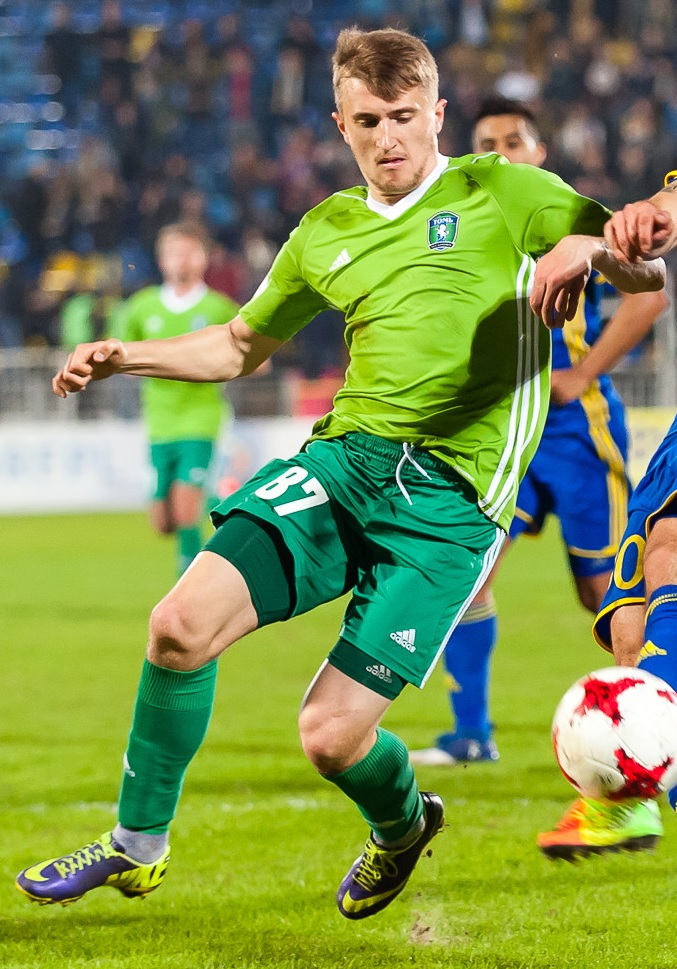
- Sasin with Tom Tomsk in 2017

Personal information
- Full name: Dmitri Andreyevich Sasin
- Date of birth: 21 August 1996 (age 30)
- Place of birth: Kemerovo, Russia
- Height: 1.74 m (5 ft 8 1/2 in)
- Positions: Midfielder; forward

Team information
- Current team: Sokol Saratov
- Number: 77

Youth career
- 2012–2013: FC Kemerovo

Senior career*
Years	Team	Apps	(Gls)
2013–2020	Tom Tomsk	84	(2)
2014–2016	→ Tom-2 Tomsk	44	(8)
2020–2021	Slutsk	39	(9)
2022–2023	Akron Tolyatti	33	(1)
2023–2025	Sokol Saratov	63	(6)
2025	Rotor Volgograd	14	(1)
2026–	Sokol Saratov	30	(1)
- * Club domestic league appearances and goals as of 15 November 2026

Dmitri Andreyevich Sasin (Russian: Дмитрий Андреевич Сасин; born 21 August 1996) is a Russian football player who plays for Sokol Saratov.

== Club career ==
He made his professional debut in the Russian Professional Football League for Tom-2 Tomsk on 19 July 2014 in a game against Yakutiya Yakutsk.

He made his Russian Premier League debut for Tom Tomsk on 3 March 2017 in a game against Rostov.
