= Aleksandr Naumenko (footballer) =

Russian footballer

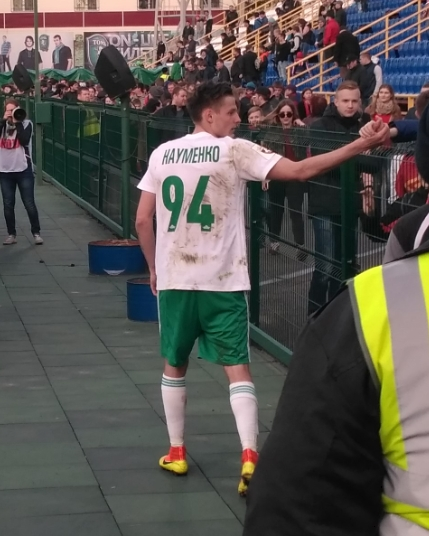

Personal information
- Full name: Aleksandr Yevgenyevich Naumenko
- Date of birth: 9 November 1997 (age 28)
- Place of birth: Tomsk, Russia
- Height: 1.80 m (5 ft 11 in)
- Positions: Defender; midfielder

Senior career*
Years	Team	Apps	(Gls)
2016–2017	Tom Tomsk	3	(0)
2017–2018	Khimik Novomoskovsk	13	(0)
2018–2020	Tom-2 Tomsk (amateur)		
2020–2021	PFC Yalta		
2021	Torpedo Rubtsovsk (amateur)		
2021–2022	Rubin Yalta		
2022	Ocean Kerch		
2022–2023	Raspadskaya (amateur)		
2023	Uralets-TS Nizhny Tagil	1	(0)
- * Club domestic league appearances and goals as of 13 August 2023

Aleksandr Yevgenyevich Naumenko (Russian: Александр Евгеньевич Науменко; born 9 November 1997) is a Russian football player.

== Club career ==
He made his debut in the Russian Premier League for FC Tom Tomsk on 1 April 2017 in a game against FC Arsenal Tula.
