= Osip Bilchansky =

Russian terrorist

Osip Bilchansky (pseudonym 'Gorbachev') (Russian: Осип Бильчанский, пцевдоным Горбачев) (1858-14 July 1879) was a Russian Empire terrorist hanged for using a gun to resist arrest.

== Biography ==
Bilchansky was the son of a police officer, who worked as a locksmith. When aged about 20, he joined a terrorist group in Zhytomyr, in Ukraine, led by a student at the Technological Institute, named Basov. Arrested in 1879, he shot a police officer during an unsuccessful attempt to escape. He was tried with other revolutionaries at the Kiev military court, accused of attempting to rob the post train between Zhytomyr and Kiev in December 1978, and of killing a youth named Taras Kurilov, who was suspected of being a police informer. Bilchansky was sentenced to death, and hanged on 14 July 1879.
