= Yegor Chernyshov (footballer, born 1997) =

Russian footballer

Personal information
- Full name: Yegor Aleksandrovich Chernyshov
- Date of birth: 18 April 1997 (age 29)
- Place of birth: Barnaul, Russia
- Height: 1.74 m (5 ft 9 in)
- Position: Defender

Youth career
- 2010–2016: Dynamo Barnaul
- 2016–2017: Tom Tomsk

Senior career*
Years	Team	Apps	(Gls)
2016–2017	Tom Tomsk	0	(0)
- * Club domestic league appearances and goals

Yegor Aleksandrovich Chernyshov (Russian: Егор Александрович Чернышов; born 18 April 1997) is a Russian former football player.

== Club career ==
He made his debut for the main squad of Tom Tomsk in the Russian Cup game against Sibir Novosibirsk on 21 September 2016.
