= Andrei Zorin =

Russian footballer

Personal information
- Full name: Andrei Andreyevich Zorin
- Date of birth: 4 May 1997 (age 29)
- Place of birth: Angarsk, Russia
- Height: 1.75 m (5 ft 9 in)
- Position: Midfielder

Team information
- Current team: Alay
- Number: 41

Youth career
- UOR-5 Yegoryevsk
- CSKA Moscow

Senior career*
Years	Team	Apps	(Gls)
2014	Krasnodar-3		
2014	FC Angara-ANKhK Angarsk		
2016	Baikal Irkutsk	14	(2)
2016–2017	Tom Tomsk	1	(0)
2018	Saturn Ramenskoye	6	(0)
2019	West Armenia	14	(2)
2020	Leader-Champion	1	(0)
2020–2021	Kaganat		(0)
2021	Van	0	(0)
2022–	Alay		
- * Club domestic league appearances and goals as of 18 May 2022

Andrei Andreyevich Zorin (Russian: Андрей Андреевич Зорин; born 4 May 1997) is a Russian football player plays for FC Alay in the Kyrgyz Premier League.

== Club career ==
He made his debut in the Russian Football National League for FC Baikal Irkutsk on 12 March 2016 in a game against FC Yenisey Krasnoyarsk.

He made his Russian Premier League debut for FC Tom Tomsk on 21 May 2017 in a game against FC Krasnodar.

In 2020, Zorin joined Leader-Champion Issyk-Kul in Kyrgyzstan.

On 4 June 2021, FC Van announced that Zorin had left the club.
