= Maxim Osipov (ice hockey, born 1980) =

Russian ice hockey player

- Born: April 15, 1980 (age 46) Moscow, Russian SFSR, Soviet Union
- Height: 5 ft 10 in (178 cm)
- Weight: 176 lb (80 kg; 12 st 8 lb)
- Position: Centre
- Shot: Left
- Played for: Krylya Sovetov Moscow; HC CSKA Moscow; HC Neftekhimik Nizhnekamsk; HC Dynamo Moscow; Torpedo Nizhny Novgorod; HC Rys; Neman Grodno; HC Berkut-Kyiv; Molot-Prikamye Perm
- NHL draft: Undrafted
- Playing career: 1999–2015

Maxim Nikolaevich Osipov (born April 15, 1980) is a Russian ice hockey centre. He currently plays for Neman Grodno in the Belarusian Extraleague.

== Career statistics ==
			Regular season					Playoffs
Season	Team	League	GP	G	A	Pts	PIM	GP	G	A	Pts	PIM
1996–97	HC CSKA Moscow-2	Russia3	32	7	3	10	12	—	—	—	—	—
1997–98	HC CSKA Moscow-2	Russia3	25	6	4	10	6	—	—	—	—	—
1997–98	HC CSKA Moscow-2	Russia2	—	—	—	—	—	—	—	—	—	—
1998–99	HC CSKA Moscow-2	Russia2	2	0	2	2	4	—	—	—	—	—
1999–00	HC CSKA Moscow	Russia2	44	14	23	37	24	—	—	—	—	—
1999–00	HC CSKA Moscow-2	Russia3	5	1	3	4	0	—	—	—	—	—
2000–01	Krylya Sovetov Moscow	Russia2	24	9	6	15	4	14	4	4	8	6
2000–01	Krylya Sovetov Moscow-2	Russia3	5	2	9	11	6	—	—	—	—	—
2001–02	Krylya Sovetov Moscow	Russia	36	3	5	8	10	3	0	1	1	0
2001–02	Krylya Sovetov Moscow-2	Russia3	10	8	10	18	4	—	—	—	—	—
2002–03	HC CSKA Moscow	Russia	33	2	7	9	18	—	—	—	—	—
2002–03	HC CSKA Moscow-2	Russia3	4	3	3	6	0	—	—	—	—	—
2003–04	HC Neftekhimik Nizhnekamsk	Russia	35	5	5	10	16	5	0	0	0	2
2003–04	HC Neftekhimik Nizhnekamsk-2	Russia3	1	0	2	2	0	—	—	—	—	—
2004–05	HC Neftekhimik Nizhnekamsk	Russia	44	8	9	17	26	3	0	1	1	2
2005–06	HC Neftekhimik Nizhnekamsk	Russia	29	10	7	17	26	4	0	1	1	0
2005–06	HC Neftekhimik Nizhnekamsk-2	Russia3	1	0	2	2	0	—	—	—	—	—
2006–07	HC Dynamo Moscow	Russia	37	7	9	16	24	3	0	1	1	2
2006–07	HC Dynamo Moscow-2	Russia3	2	0	2	2	0	—	—	—	—	—
2007–08	HC Dynamo Moscow	Russia	10	0	1	1	4	—	—	—	—	—
2007–08	Torpedo Nizhny Novgorod	Russia	12	0	1	1	8	—	—	—	—	—
2007–08	Torpedo Nizhny Novgorod-2	Russia3	2	0	2	2	0	—	—	—	—	—
2008–09	HC Rys	Russia2	55	12	27	39	76	3	0	0	0	4
2009–10	HC CSKA Moscow	KHL	23	0	2	2	12	—	—	—	—	—
2009–10	Krylya Sovetov Moscow	Russia2	3	0	0	0	4	5	1	0	1	10
2010–11	HC Neman Grodno	Belarus	34	15	6	21	34	11	7	6	13	16
2011–12	HC Neman Grodno	Belarus	39	12	33	45	24	15	3	9	12	10
2012–13	Berkut Kyiv	Ukraine	16	6	6	12	24	—	—	—	—	—
2013–14	Molot-Prikamye Perm	VHL	11	2	1	3	2	—	—	—	—	—
2014–15	HC Neman Grodno	Belarus	34	4	22	26	30	9	1	3	4	6
KHL totals			23	0	2	2	12	—	—	—	—	—
Russia totals			236	35	44	79	132	18	0	4	4	6
Belarus totals			107	31	61	92	88	35	11	18	29	32
Russia2 totals			128	35	58	93	112	22	5	4	9	20
