= Aleksandr Zhirov (footballer) =

Russian footballer

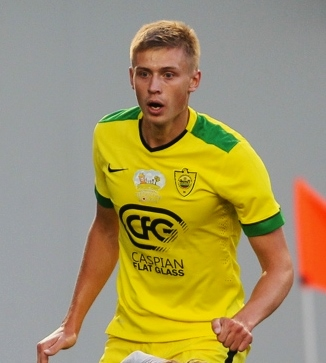
- Zhirov with Anzhi Makhachkala in 2015

Personal information
- Full name: Aleksandr Vyacheslavovich Zhirov
- Date of birth: 24 January 1991 (age 35)
- Place of birth: Barnaul, Russian SFSR, Soviet Union
- Height: 1.93 m (6 ft 4 in)
- Position: Centre-back

Team information
- Current team: SKA-Khabarovsk
- Number: 2

Senior career*
| Years | Team | Apps | (Gls) |
| 2009–2013 | Dynamo Barnaul | 75 | (3) |
| 2013–2015 | Volgar Astrakhan | 73 | (4) |
| 2015–2016 | Anzhi Makhachkala | 34 | (1) |
| 2016 | Tom Tomsk | 11 | (0) |
| 2017 | Krasnodar | 0 | (0) |
| 2017 | → Anzhi Makhachkala (loan) | 13 | (0) |
| 2017 | → Krasnodar-2 | 3 | (0) |
| 2018 | Yenisey Krasnoyarsk | 12 | (0) |
| 2018–2023 | SV Sandhausen | 146 | (7) |
| 2023–2024 | Baltika Kaliningrad | 19 | (0) |
| 2024–2025 | Akhmat Grozny | 21 | (2) |
| 2025–2026 | Chelyabinsk | 30 | (4) |
| 2026 | SKA Rostov-on-Don (amateur) | | |
| 2026– | SKA-Khabarovsk | 3 | (0) |
- * Club domestic league appearances and goals as of 29 September 2026

Aleksandr Vyacheslavovich Zhirov (Russian: Александр Вячеславович Жиров; born 24 January 1991) is a Russian professional footballer who plays as a centre-back for SKA-Khabarovsk.

== Club career ==
On 12 January 2017, Zhirov signed a 3.5-year contract with Krasnodar and was immediately loaned to Anzhi Makhachkala for the rest of the 2016–17 season.

He was released from his Krasnodar contract by mutual consent on 12 February 2018, signing with the second-tier Yenisey Krasnoyarsk the next day.

On 12 June 2018, he signed a two-year contract with the German club SV Sandhausen.

On 18 June 2023, Zhirov signed a one-year contract with Russian Premier League club Baltika Kaliningrad, with an option to extend for the second year.

On 26 June 2024, Zhirov joined Akhmat Grozny for the 2024–25 season, with an option for the 2025–26 season. Zhirov left Akhmat on 14 June 2025.

== International career ==
In September 2020, he was called up to the Russia national team for the first time for UEFA Nations League games against Turkey and Hungary and a friendly against Sweden.

== Career statistics ==
As of match played 24 May 2025

Appearances and goals by club, season and competition
| Club | Season | League | | | National cup (Note: Includes Russian Cup, DFB-Pokal) | | Europe | | Other | | Total | |
| Club | Season | Division | Apps | Goals | Apps | Goals | Apps | Goals | Apps | Goals | Apps | Goals |
|---|---|---|---|---|---|---|---|---|---|---|---|---|
| Dynamo Barnaul | 2009 | Russian Second Division | 28 | 1 | 0 | 0 | — | | — | | 28 | 1 |
| Dynamo Barnaul | 2010 | Russian Second Division | 0 | 0 | 3 | 0 | — | | — | | 3 | 0 |
| Dynamo Barnaul | 2011–12 | Russian Second Division | 30 | 1 | 1 | 0 | — | | — | | 31 | 1 |
| Dynamo Barnaul | 2012–13 | Russian Second Division | 17 | 1 | 2 | 0 | — | | — | | 19 | 1 |
| Dynamo Barnaul | Total | | 75 | 3 | 6 | 0 | — | | — | | 81 | 3 |
| Volgar Astrakhan | 2012–13 | Russian First League | 10 | 0 | — | | — | | — | | 10 | 0 |
| Volgar Astrakhan | 2013–14 | Russian Second League | 31 | 3 | — | | — | | — | | 31 | 3 |
| Volgar Astrakhan | 2014–15 | Russian First League | 32 | 1 | — | | — | | — | | 32 | 1 |
| Volgar Astrakhan | Total | | 73 | 4 | — | | — | | — | | 73 | 4 |
| Anzhi Makhachkala | 2015–16 | Russian Premier League | 30 | 1 | 2 | 0 | 0 | 0 | 2 (Note: Appearances in promotion/relegation playoffs) | 0 | 34 | 1 |
| Anzhi Makhachkala | 2016–17 | Russian Premier League | 15 | 0 | 1 | 0 | — | | — | | 16 | 0 |
| Anzhi Makhachkala | Total | | 45 | 1 | 3 | 0 | 0 | 0 | 2 | 0 | 50 | 1 |
| Tom Tomsk (loan) | 2016–17 | Russian Premier League | 11 | 0 | — | | — | | — | | 11 | 0 |
| Krasnodar | 2017–18 | Russian Premier League | 0 | 0 | 0 | 0 | 0 | 0 | 0 | 0 | 0 | 0 |
| Krasnodar-2 | 2017–18 | Russian Second League | 3 | 0 | — | | — | | — | | 3 | 0 |
| Yenisey Krasnoyarsk | 2017–18 | Russian First League | 12 | 0 | — | | — | | 2 | 0 | 14 | 0 |
| Sandhausen II | 2018–19 | Verbandsliga Nordbaden | 4 | 0 | — | | — | | — | | 4 | 0 |
| SV Sandhausen | 2018–19 | 2. Bundesliga | 18 | 2 | 0 | 0 | — | | — | | 18 | 2 |
| SV Sandhausen | 2019–20 | 2. Bundesliga | 33 | 1 | 1 | 0 | — | | — | | 34 | 1 |
| SV Sandhausen | 2020–21 | 2. Bundesliga | 29 | 1 | 0 | 0 | — | | — | | 29 | 1 |
| SV Sandhausen | 2021–22 | 2. Bundesliga | 33 | 1 | 1 | 0 | — | | — | | 34 | 1 |
| SV Sandhausen | 2022–23 | 2. Bundesliga | 33 | 2 | 3 | 0 | — | | — | | 36 | 2 |
| SV Sandhausen | Total | | 146 | 7 | 5 | 0 | — | | — | | 151 | 7 |
| Baltika Kaliningrad | 2023–24 | Russian Premier League | 19 | 0 | 9 | 0 | — | | — | | 28 | 0 |
| Akhmat Grozny | 2024–25 | Russian Premier League | 21 | 2 | 7 | 0 | — | | — | | 28 | 2 |
| Career total | | | 409 | 17 | 30 | 0 | 0 | 0 | 4 | 0 | 443 | 17 |
