= Anton Miterev =

Russian footballer

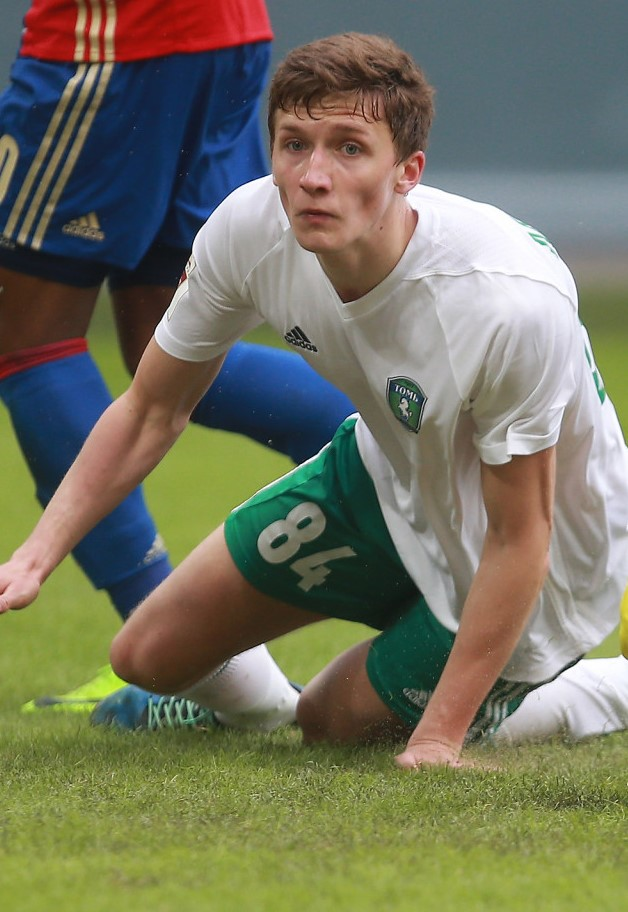
- Miterev with Tom Tomsk in 2017

Personal information
- Full name: Anton Dmitriyevich Miterev
- Date of birth: 3 May 1996 (age 30)
- Place of birth: Tomsk, Russia
- Height: 1.92 m (6 ft 4 in)
- Position: Centre back

Team information
- Current team: Alyans Tomsk

Youth career
- 2013–2014: Tom Tomsk

Senior career*
Years	Team	Apps	(Gls)
2013–2018	Tom Tomsk	16	(0)
2014–2016	→ Tom-2 Tomsk	16	(0)
2019	NFK Minsk	18	(0)
2020	BFC Daugavpils	3	(0)
2020–2021	Chita	5	(0)
2022	Gvardeyets Skvortsovo	5	(1)
2022–2023	TSK Tomsk (amateur)		
2024–	Alyans Tomsk (amateur)		
- * Club domestic league appearances and goals as of 31 July 2022

Anton Dmitriyevich Miterev (Russian: Антон Дмитриевич Митерев; born 3 May 1996) is a Russian football player.

== Club career ==
He made his professional debut in the Russian Professional Football League for FC Tom-2 Tomsk on 31 August 2014 in a game against FC Metallurg Novokuznetsk.

He made his Russian Premier League debut for FC Tom Tomsk on 3 March 2017 in a game against FC Rostov.
