= Aleksandr Bukachyov =

Russian football player

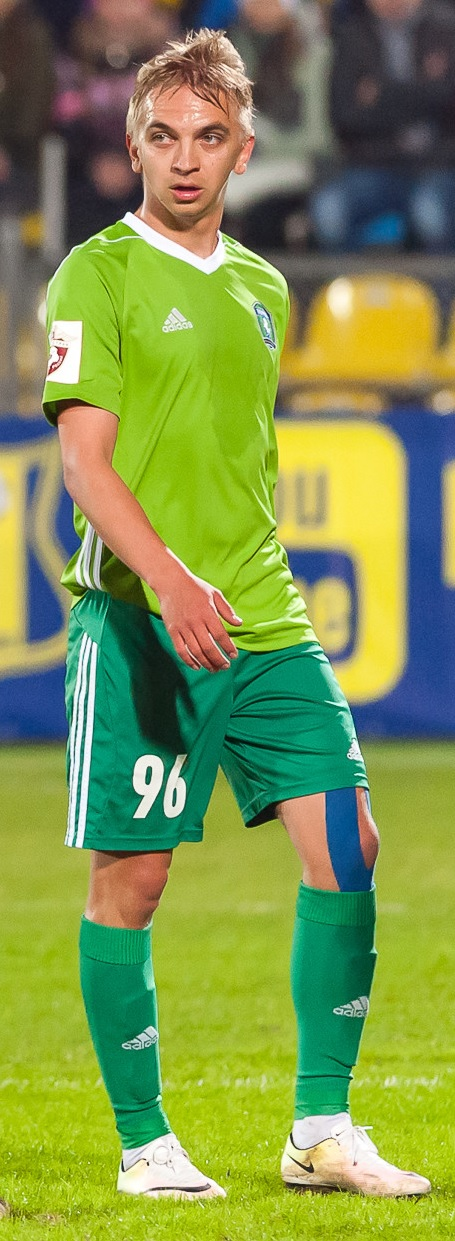
- Bukachyov with Tom Tomsk in 2017

Personal information
- Full name: Aleksandr Igorevich Bukachyov
- Date of birth: 7 March 1996 (age 30)
- Place of birth: Omsk, Russia
- Height: 1.73 m (5 ft 8 in)
- Position: Defender

Senior career*
Years	Team	Apps	(Gls)
2013–2014	FC Tom Tomsk	0	(0)
2014–2016	FC Tom-2 Tomsk	28	(0)
2016–2017	FC Tom Tomsk	7	(0)
2017–2019	FC Irtysh Omsk	18	(0)
- * Club domestic league appearances and goals as of 28 May 2019

Aleksandr Igorevich Bukachyov (Russian: Александр Игоревич Букачёв; born 7 March 1996) is a Russian football player.

== Club career ==
He was plays for FC Tom Tomsk and made his professional debut in the Russian Professional Football League for FC Tom-2 Tomsk on 19 July 2014 in a game against FC Yakutiya Yakutsk.

He made his Russian Premier League debut for FC Tom Tomsk on 3 March 2017 in a game against FC Rostov.
