= Ruslan Shauvkhalov =

Russian footballer

Personal information
- Full name: Ruslan Shauvkhalov
- Date of birth: 31 December 1996 (age 29)
- Place of birth: Chechnya
- Height: 1.75 m (5 ft 9 in)
- Position: Midfielder

Team information
- Current team: Dacia Chișinău
- Number: 13

Senior career*
Years	Team	Apps	(Gls)
2014–2015	Dacia Chișinău	2	(0)
2015	FC Academia Chișinău	14	(1)
2015–2016	Dacia Chișinău	1	(0)
- * Club domestic league appearances and goals as of 20 April 2016

Ruslan Shauvkhalov (born 31 December 1996), is a Chechen football midfielder who plays for Dacia Chișinău.
