= Dmitri Osipov (ice hockey) =

Russian ice hockey player (born 1979)

- Born: May 27, 1979 (age 46) Togliatti, Russia
- Height: 6 ft 0 in (183 cm)
- Weight: 187 lb (85 kg; 13 st 5 lb)
- Position: Defence
- Shot: Left
- Played for: RSL; CSK VVS Samara
- NHL draft: Undrafted
- Playing career: 1998–2013

Dmitri Osipov (born May 27, 1979) is a Russian former professional ice hockey defenceman. During the 1998–99 season he played with CSK VVS Samara of the Russian Superleague during both the regular season and playoffs.

Osipov last played with HC Levy of the Ukrainian Professional Hockey League during the 2013 playoffs.
