= Artyom Popov =

Russian footballer (born 1992)

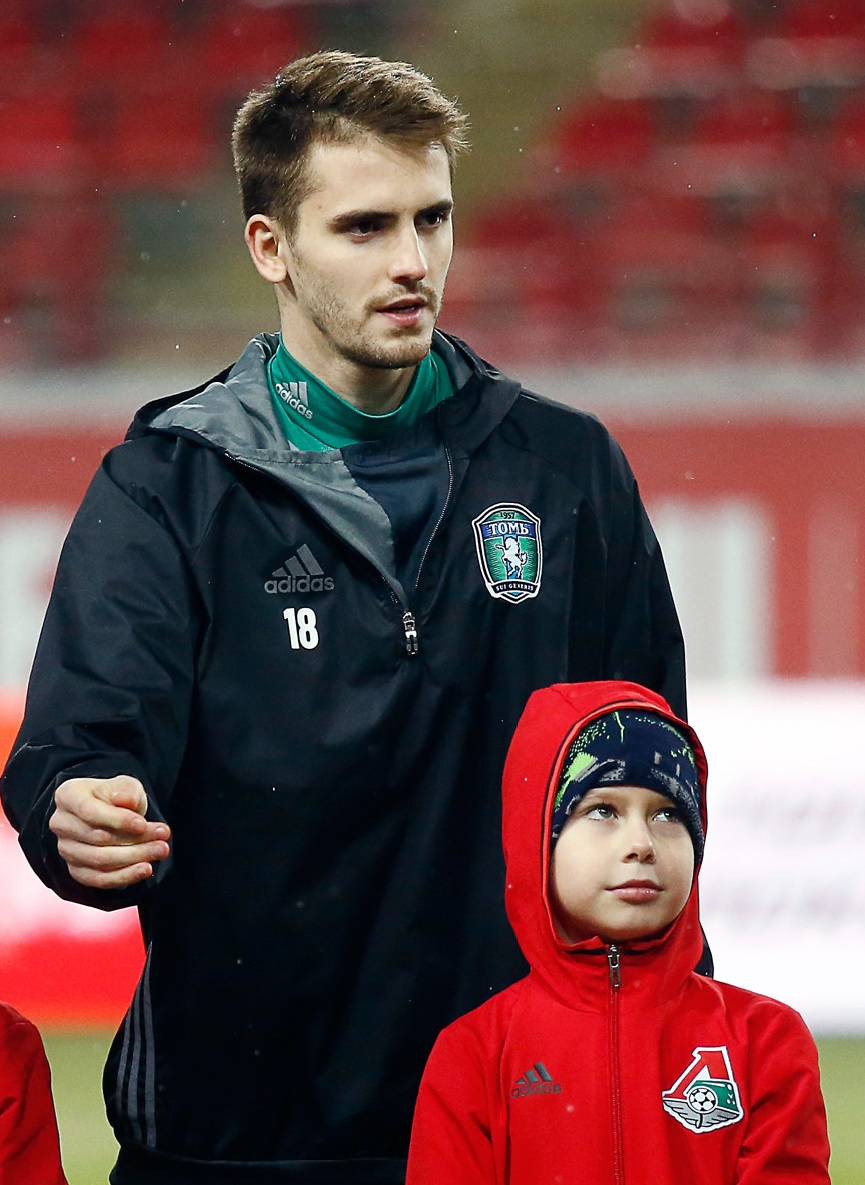
- Popov with Tom Tomsk in 2016

Personal information
- Full name: Artyom Igorevich Popov
- Date of birth: 30 August 1992 (age 34)
- Place of birth: Lipetsk, Russia
- Height: 1.76 m (5 ft 9 in)
- Position: Full-back

Team information
- Current team: FC KAMAZ Naberezhnye Chelny
- Number: 18

Youth career
- PFC CSKA Moscow

Senior career*
Years	Team	Apps	(Gls)
2010–2012	PFC CSKA Moscow	1	(0)
2013	→ FC Lokomotiv-2 Moscow (loan)	9	(1)
2013	FC Lokomotiv-2 Moscow	21	(5)
2014–2016	FC Zenit-2 Saint Petersburg	73	(12)
2016–2017	FC Tom Tomsk	25	(0)
2017–2018	FC Orenburg	20	(1)
2018–2020	FC Rotor Volgograd	53	(2)
2020–2021	FC Nizhny Novgorod	36	(5)
2021–2022	FC Baltika Kaliningrad	37	(2)
2022–2023	FC Rubin Kazan	17	(0)
2023–2026	FC Arsenal Tula	72	(2)
2026–	FC KAMAZ Naberezhnye Chelny	0	(0)

International career
2008	Russia U-16	14	(6)
2010	Russia U-18	3	(0)
2011	Russia U-19	7	(1)
- * Club domestic league appearances and goals as of 16 May 2026

Artyom Igorevich Popov (Russian: Артём Игоревич Попов; born 30 August 1992) is a Russian professional football player who plays as a full-back (left or right) for FC KAMAZ Naberezhnye Chelny. Earlier in his career, he mostly played as a winger (also on both sides), and he is occasionally still deployed in that position.

== Club career ==
He made his Russian Premier League debut for PFC CSKA Moscow on 24 September 2011 in a game against FC Volga Nizhny Novgorod.
