= Lukáš Droppa =

Czech footballer

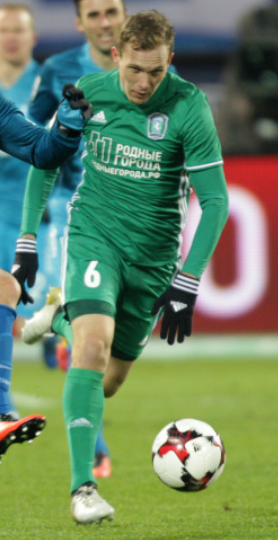
- Droppa with Tom Tomsk in 2016

Personal information
- Date of birth: 22 April 1989 (age 37)
- Place of birth: Uherské Hradiště, Czechoslovakia
- Height: 1.85 m (6 ft 1 in)
- Positions: Defensive midfielder; right back

Team information
- Current team: Slovácko B

Youth career
- 1996–1997: TJ Traplice
- 1997–2005: Slovácko
- 2005–2008: Sparta Prague

Senior career*
Years	Team	Apps	(Gls)
2008–2011	Sparta Prague B	47	(2)
2010–2011	→ Graffin Vlašim (loan)	20	(4)
2011–2014	Baník Ostrava	67	(2)
2014–2015	Śląsk Wrocław	32	(1)
2015–2016	Pandurii Târgu Jiu	23	(0)
2016	Tom Tomsk	11	(0)
2017	Bandırmaspor	11	(0)
2017–2018	Slovan Bratislava	17	(0)
2018–2019	Shakhter Karagandy	24	(0)
2019–2020	Gaz Metan Mediaș	37	(0)
2021–2025	Voluntari	82	(4)
2025	Strání	0	(0)
2025–	Slovácko B	0	(0)

International career
2007	Czech Republic U18	2	(0)
2008	Czech Republic U19	3	(0)
2016	Czech Republic	4	(0)
- * Club domestic league appearances and goals as of 14 December 2024

Lukáš Droppa (born 22 April 1989) is a Czech professional footballer who plays as a midfielder for Moravian-Silesian Football League club Slovácko B.

== Career ==
=== Club ===
On 13 July 2016, he signed a two-year contract with the Russian side Tom Tomsk.

On 21 January 2017, he moved to Turkey, signing a 1.5-year contract with Bandırmaspor.

On 26 June 2019, Droppa left Shakhter Karagandy and a day later signed with Romanian Liga I side Gaz Metan Mediaș.

== International ==
Droppa got his first call up to the senior Czech Republic side for 2018 FIFA World Cup qualifiers against Germany and Azerbaijan in October 2016.

=== International stats ===
As of match played 15 November 2016

Appearances and goals by national team and year
National team	Year	Apps	Goals
Czech Republic	2016	4	0
Total		4	0

== Honours ==
Slovan Bratislava

- Slovak Cup: 2017–18

Voluntari

- Cupa României runner-up: 2021–22
