= Aslan Dudiyev =

Russian professional footballer

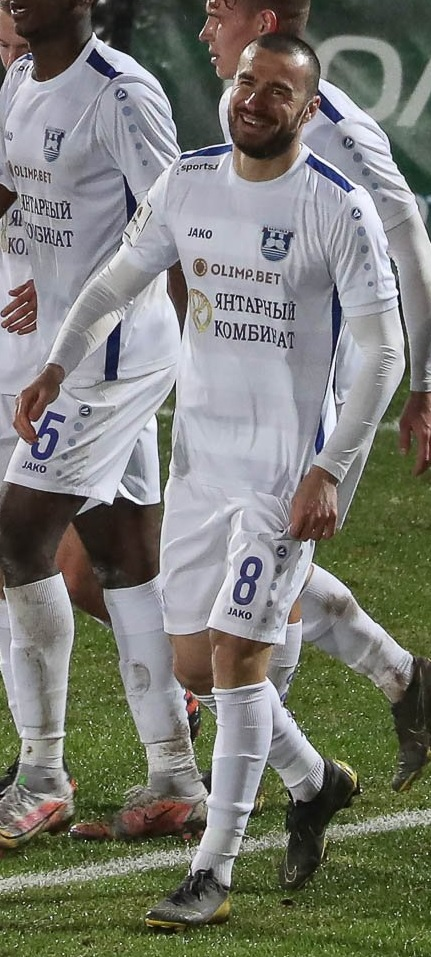
- Dudiyev with Baltika in 2021

Personal information
- Full name: Aslan Muratovich Dudiyev
- Date of birth: 15 June 1990 (age 36)
- Place of birth: Alagir, Russian SFSR
- Height: 1.81 m (5 ft 11 in)
- Positions: Right back; right midfielder

Youth career
- Konoplyov football academy

Senior career*
| Years | Team | Apps | (Gls) |
| 2007 | Krylia Sovetov-SOK Dimitrovgrad | 15 | (0) |
| 2008–2009 | Tolyatti | 54 | (0) |
| 2010 | Akademiya Tolyatti | 0 | (0) |
| 2010 | → Zenit Saint Petersburg (loan) | 0 | (0) |
| 2011–2013 | Alania Vladikavkaz | 73 | (2) |
| 2014 | SKA-Energiya Khabarovsk | 5 | (0) |
| 2014–2016 | Mordovia Saransk | 48 | (1) |
| 2016 | Tom Tomsk | 8 | (0) |
| 2017 | Anzhi Makhachkala | 3 | (0) |
| 2017–2018 | Tosno | 7 | (0) |
| 2018–2021 | Baltika Kaliningrad | 51 | (4) |
| 2021–2022 | Rotor Volgograd | 30 | (0) |
| 2022–2023 | Baltika Kaliningrad | 45 | (1) |
| 2024 | Sokol Saratov | 22 | (0) |

International career
| 2009 | Russia U19 | 7 | (1) |
| 2010–2011 | Russia U21 | 2 | (0) |
- * Club domestic league appearances and goals

Aslan Muratovich Dudiyev (Russian: Аслан Муратович Дудиев; born 15 June 1990) is a Russian former professional footballer who played as a right back or right midfielder.

== Club career ==
He made his Russian Premier League debut for Alania Vladikavkaz on 29 July 2012 in a game against Rubin Kazan.

On 14 December 2023, Dudiyev's contract with Baltika Kaliningrad was terminated by mutual consent.

== Career statistics ==
As of 25 May 2024

| Club | Season | League | | | Cup | | Continental | | Other | | Total | |
| Club | Season | Division | Apps | Goals | Apps | Goals | Apps | Goals | Apps | Goals | Apps | Goals |
|---|---|---|---|---|---|---|---|---|---|---|---|---|
| Krylia Sovetov-SOK | 2007 | Russian Second League | 15 | 0 | – | | – | | – | | 15 | 0 |
| Tolyatti | 2008 | Russian Second League | 29 | 0 | 2 | 0 | – | | – | | 31 | 0 |
| Tolyatti | 2009 | Russian Second League | 25 | 0 | 0 | 0 | – | | – | | 25 | 0 |
| Tolyatti | Total | | 54 | 0 | 2 | 0 | 0 | 0 | 0 | 0 | 56 | 0 |
| Zenit Saint Petersburg (loan) | 2010 | Russian Premier League | 0 | 0 | 0 | 0 | – | | – | | 0 | 0 |
| Alania Vladikavkaz | 2011–12 | Russian First League | 37 | 1 | 3 | 0 | 4 (Note: Appearances in the UEFA Europa League) | 0 | – | | 44 | 1 |
| Alania Vladikavkaz | 2012–13 | Russian Premier League | 18 | 0 | 0 | 0 | – | | – | | 18 | 0 |
| Alania Vladikavkaz | 2013–14 | Russian First League | 18 | 1 | 1 | 0 | – | | – | | 19 | 1 |
| Alania Vladikavkaz | Total | | 73 | 2 | 4 | 0 | 4 | 0 | 0 | 0 | 81 | 2 |
| SKA-Energiya Khabarovsk | 2013–14 | Russian First League | 5 | 0 | – | | – | | 2 (Note: Appearances in the FNL Cup) | 0 | 7 | 0 |
| Mordovia Saransk | 2014–15 | Russian Premier League | 22 | 1 | 2 | 0 | – | | – | | 24 | 1 |
| Mordovia Saransk | 2015–16 | Russian Premier League | 26 | 0 | 1 | 0 | – | | – | | 27 | 0 |
| Mordovia Saransk | Total | | 48 | 1 | 3 | 0 | 0 | 0 | 0 | 0 | 51 | 1 |
| Tom Tomsk | 2016–17 | Russian Premier League | 8 | 0 | 1 | 0 | – | | – | | 9 | 0 |
| Anzhi Makhachkala | 2016–17 | Russian Premier League | 3 | 0 | 0 | 0 | – | | – | | 3 | 0 |
| Tosno | 2017–18 | Russian Premier League | 7 | 0 | 0 | 0 | – | | – | | 7 | 0 |
| Baltika Kaliningrad | 2018–19 | Russian First League | 8 | 1 | 0 | 0 | – | | – | | 8 | 1 |
| Baltika Kaliningrad | 2019–20 | Russian First League | 13 | 0 | 1 | 0 | – | | – | | 14 | 0 |
| Baltika Kaliningrad | 2020–21 | Russian First League | 30 | 3 | 1 | 0 | – | | – | | 31 | 3 |
| Baltika Kaliningrad | Total | | 51 | 4 | 2 | 0 | 0 | 0 | 0 | 0 | 53 | 4 |
| Rotor Volgograd | 2021–22 | Russian First League | 30 | 0 | 2 | 0 | – | | – | | 32 | 0 |
| Baltika Kaliningrad | 2022–23 | Russian First League | 32 | 1 | 1 | 0 | – | | – | | 33 | 1 |
| Baltika Kaliningrad | 2023–24 | Russian Premier League | 13 | 0 | 5 | 0 | – | | – | | 18 | 0 |
| Baltika Kaliningrad | Total | | 45 | 1 | 6 | 0 | 0 | 0 | 0 | 0 | 51 | 1 |
| Sokol Saratov | 2023–24 | Russian First League | 11 | 0 | – | | – | | – | | 11 | 0 |
| Career total | | | 350 | 8 | 20 | 0 | 4 | 0 | 2 | 0 | 376 | 8 |
