= Nikita Gvineysky =

Russian footballer

Personal information
- Full name: Nikita Maksimovich Gvineysky
- Date of birth: 28 December 1998 (age 27)
- Place of birth: Prokopyevsk, Russia
- Height: 1.77 m (5 ft 10 in)
- Position: Midfielder

Senior career*
Years	Team	Apps	(Gls)
2016–2019	FC Tom Tomsk	37	(1)
2019–2020	FC Sokol Saratov	11	(2)
2020–2021	FC Forte Taganrog	5	(0)
- * Club domestic league appearances and goals

Nikita Maksimovich Gvineysky (Russian: Никита Максимович Гвинейский; born 28 December 1998) is a Russian former football player.

== Club career ==
He made his debut in the Russian Premier League for FC Tom Tomsk on 3 March 2017 in a game against FC Rostov.
