= Ruslan Salakhutdinov (footballer) =

Russian footballer

Personal information
- Full name: Ruslan Ramilyevich Salakhutdinov
- Date of birth: 1 April 1996 (age 30)
- Place of birth: Tomsk, Russia
- Height: 1.73 m (5 ft 8 in)
- Positions: Midfielder; forward

Senior career*
| Years | Team | Apps | (Gls) |
| 2013–2018 | Tom Tomsk | 13 | (1) |
| 2014–2016 | → Tom-2 Tomsk | 41 | (2) |
| 2018 | → Chayka Pes. (loan) | 0 | (0) |
| 2019–2020 | Krymteplytsia | | |
| 2020 | Masis | 1 | (0) |
- * Club domestic league appearances and goals

Ruslan Ramilyevich Salakhutdinov (Russian: Руслан Рамильевич Салахутдинов; born 1 April 1996) is a Russian former football player.

== Club career ==
He made his professional debut in the Russian Professional Football League for FC Tom-2 Tomsk on 19 July 2014 in a game against FC Yakutiya Yakutsk.

He made his Russian Premier League debut on 27 April 2017 in a game against FC Anzhi Makhachkala.
