= Mark Karymov =

Russian footballer

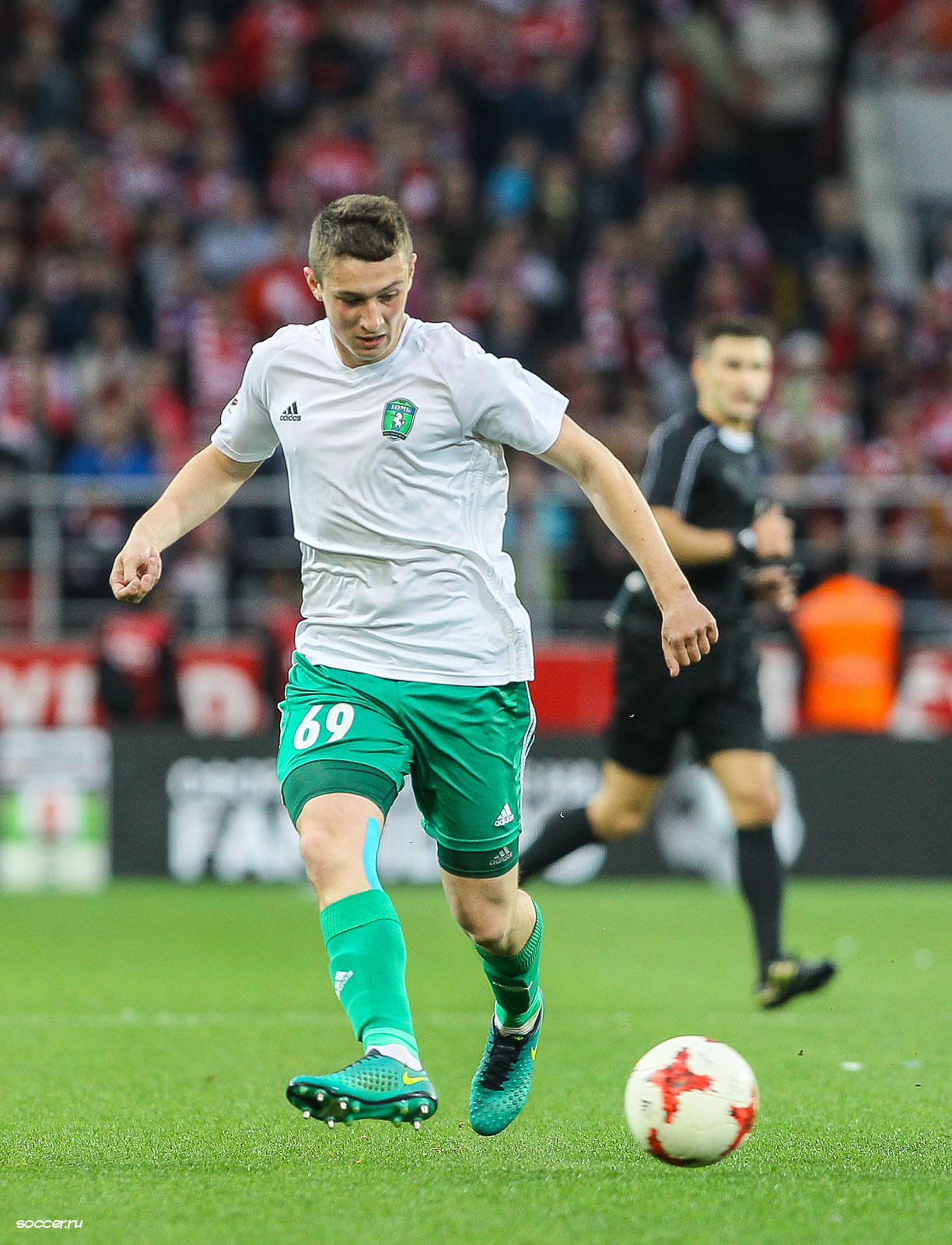
- Karymov with Tom in 2017

Personal information
- Full name: Mark Igorevich Karymov
- Date of birth: 22 June 1998 (age 28)
- Place of birth: Tomsk, Russia
- Height: 1.89 m (6 ft 2 in)
- Position: Defender

Senior career*
Years	Team	Apps	(Gls)
2016–2019	FC Tom Tomsk	13	(0)
- * Club domestic league appearances and goals

Mark Igorevich Karymov (Russian: Марк Игоревич Карымов; born 22 June 1998) is a Russian former football player.

== Club career ==
He made his Russian Premier League debut for FC Tom Tomsk on 3 March 2017 in a game against FC Rostov.
