= Dmitri Osipov (footballer) =

Russian footballer

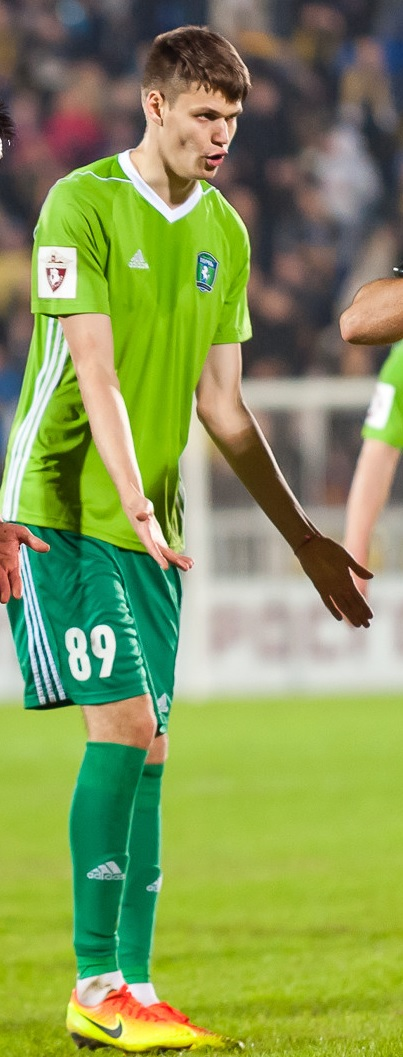
- Osipov with Tom Tomsk in 2017

Personal information
- Full name: Dmitri Vyacheslavovich Osipov
- Date of birth: 14 February 1996 (age 30)
- Place of birth: Samara, Russia
- Height: 1.87 m (6 ft 2 in)
- Position: Centre back

Team information
- Current team: Shumbrat Saransk
- Number: 32

Youth career
- –2010: Krylia Sovetov Samara
- 2010–2012: CSK VVS Samara
- 2012–2013: Krylia Sovetov Samara

Senior career*
Years	Team	Apps	(Gls)
2013–2014	Krylia Sovetov Samara	0	(0)
2014–2016	Sibir-2 Novosibirsk	7	(0)
2016–2017	Tom Tomsk	10	(0)
2017	Krylia Sovetov-2 Samara	3	(0)
2018–2019	Lada Dimitrovgrad (amateur)		
2019–2022	Chita	61	(4)
2022–2023	Torpedo Miass	16	(0)
2023–2024	Dynamo Bryansk	44	(3)
2025–2026	Torpedo Miass	32	(0)
2026	Dynamo Vladivostok	3	(0)
2026–	Shumbrat Saransk	11	(0)
- * Club domestic league appearances and goals as of 31 October 2026

Dmitri Vyacheslavovich Osipov (Russian: Дмитрий Вячеславович Осипов; born 14 February 1996) is a Russian football player who plays for Shumbrat Saransk.

== Club career ==
He made his debut in the Russian Professional Football League for Sibir-2 Novosibirsk on 29 September 2015 in a game against Sakhalin Yuzhno-Sakhalinsk.

He made his Russian Premier League debut for Tom Tomsk on 3 March 2017 in a game against Rostov.
