= Daniil Bolshunov =

Russian football player

Personal information
- Full name: Daniil Gennadyevich Bolshunov
- Date of birth: 3 April 1997 (age 29)
- Place of birth: Tolyatti, Russia
- Height: 1.78 m (5 ft 10 in)
- Position: Midfielder

Team information
- Current team: KDV Tomsk
- Number: 97

Senior career*
Years	Team	Apps	(Gls)
2015–2016	Yakutiya Yakutsk	14	(1)
2016–2020	Tom Tomsk	24	(1)
2018–2019	→ Sakhalin (loan)	20	(6)
2019–2020	→ Novosibirsk (loan)	1	(0)
2020–2021	Dynamo Stavropol	12	(3)
2021–2024	Sakhalin	97	(16)
2025–	KDV Tomsk	27	(3)
- * Club domestic league appearances and goals as of 1 November 2026

Daniil Gennadyevich Bolshunov (Russian: Даниил Геннадьевич Большунов; born 3 April 1997) is a Russian football player who plays for KDV Tomsk.

== Club career ==
He made his debut in the Russian Professional Football League for FC Yakutiya Yakutsk on 19 July 2015 in a game against FC Novokuznetsk.

He made his Russian Premier League debut for FC Tom Tomsk on 3 March 2017 in a game against FC Rostov.
