= Trud Stadium (Tomsk) =

Sports venue in Tomsk, Russia

Coordinates: 56°28′27″N 84°57′24″E

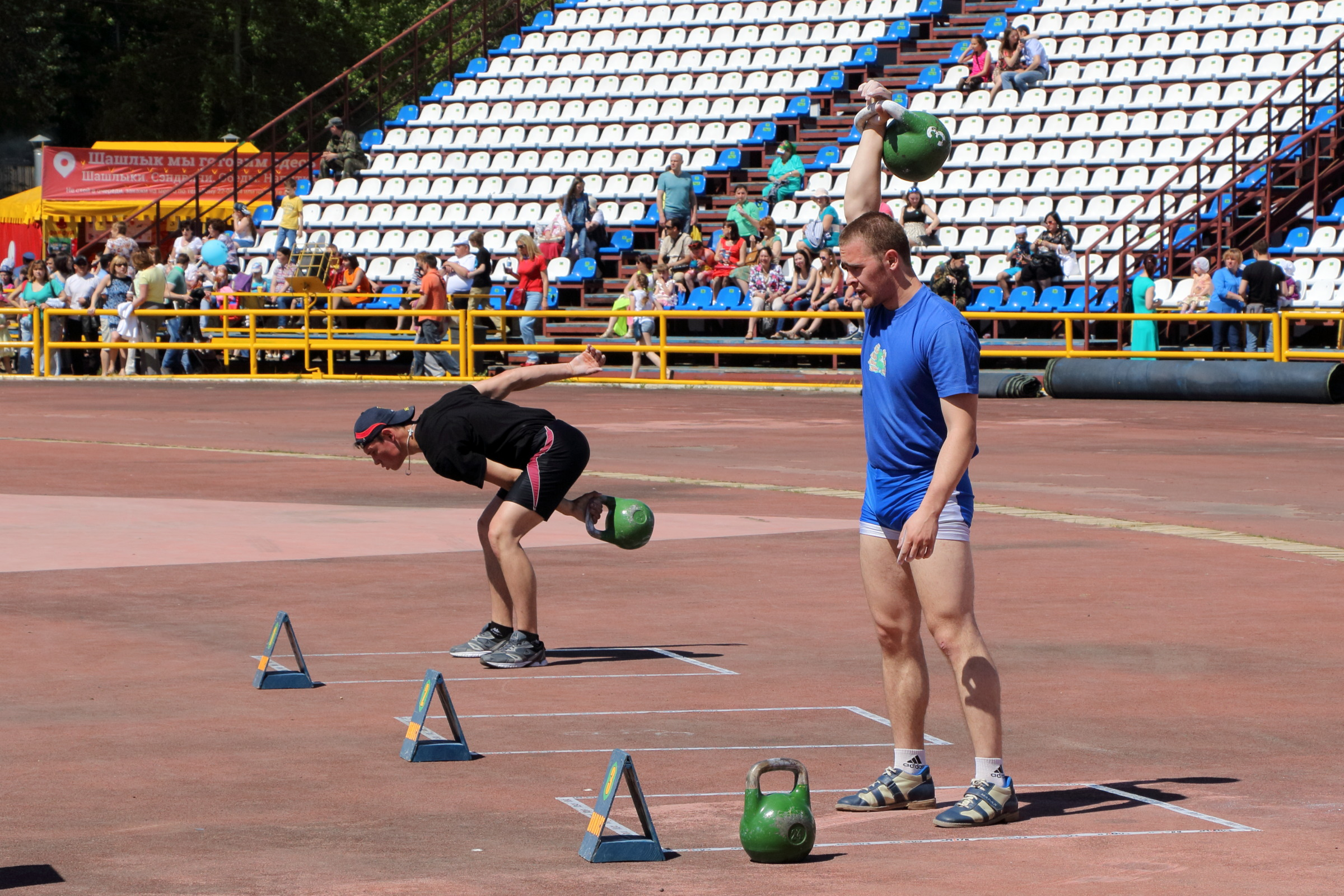
- Interactive map of Trud Stadium
- Location: Tomsk, Russia
- Owner: Tom Tomsk
- Capacity: 10,028
- Field size: 105 x 68

Construction
- Built: 1929
- Opened: 1 June 1929

Tenant
- Tom Tomsk

The Trud Stadium is a multi-purpose stadium in Tomsk, Russia. It is currently used mostly for football matches and is the home ground of FC Tom' Tomsk. The stadium holds 10,000. It was built in 1929 and opened on 1 June.

== History ==
Prior to their promotion to the Russian First Division, Trud lacked many facilities common to many European stadiums, including proper toilets. Once the team advanced and received increased sponsorship money, there were new stands built to increase the capacity of the stadium. The field was also improved with a subterranean heating system to contend with Siberian snowfalls.
