= FC Tom-2 Tomsk =

- Full name: Football Club Tom-2 Tomsk
- Founded: 2014
- Dissolved: 2016
- Ground: Trud Stadium
- Capacity: 10,000
- Manager: Viktor Sebelev
- 2015–16: PFL, Zone East, 6th

FC Tom-2 Tomsk (Russian: ФК "Томь-2" Томск) was a Russian football team from Tomsk, founded in 2014. Since 2014–15 season, it played in the Russian Professional Football League (third level). It was a farm club for the Russian National Football League team FC Tom Tomsk. It was dissolved after the conclusion of the 2015–16 season, after Tom was promoted to the Russian Football Premier League, which holds its own Under-21 competition for the Premier League clubs.
