= 2014–15 FC Ufa season =

FC Ufa
2014–15 season
- Chairman: Marat Magadeyev
- Manager: Igor Kolyvanov
- Stadium: Dynamo Stadium/Zvezda Stadium
- Russian Premier League: 12th
- Russian Cup: Last 16 vs Lokomotiv Moscow
- Top goalscorer: League: Two Players (6); All: Marcinho (6)
Home colours	Away colours

The 2014–15 FC Ufa season was the club's 1st season in the Russian Premier League, the highest tier of association football in Russia, and 4th in total. Ufa will also be taking part in the Russian Cup.

== Squad ==
Note: Flags indicate national team as defined under FIFA eligibility rules; some limited exceptions apply. Players may hold more than one non-FIFA nationality.

No.	Pos.	Nation	Player
1	GK	ARM	David Yurchenko
3	DF	RUS	Pavel Alikin
4	DF	UKR	Pavlo Stepanets
5	MF	GHA	Emmanuel Frimpong
9	FW	BIH	Haris Handžić
10	MF	BRA	Marcinho
11	FW	BRA	Diego Carlos
13	MF	RUS	Azamat Zaseyev
14	MF	RUS	Maksim Semakin
16	GK	BLR	Syarhey Vyeramko
17	MF	UKR	Oleksandr Zinchenko
18	FW	RUS	Dmitri Golubov
19	MF	CRO	Ivan Paurević
20	DF	RUS	Denis Tumasyan (on loan from Ural)
22	MF	UZB	Vagiz Galiullin

No.	Pos.	Nation	Player
23	MF	RUS	Anton Kilin
28	DF	CRC	Brown Forbes (Note: Forbes was born in Berlin, Germany, but qualified to represent Costa Rica internationally through his parents. Forbes represented Germany at U-19 & U-20 level, before going onto represent Costa Rica at full international level on 14 October 2014.)
31	DF	RUS	Maksim Tishkin
33	DF	RUS	Aleksandr Sukhov
39	MF	RUS	Dmitri Stotskiy
57	DF	RUS	Ruslan Khaziyev
63	MF	RUS	Radmir Zaripov
66	FW	RUS	Ilya Blinnikov
70	MF	RUS	Nikolai Safronidi
71	GK	RUS	Artyom Leonov
74	DF	RUS	Dmitri Pavlov
81	DF	BLR	Dmitry Verkhovtsov
88	FW	RUS	Igor Shevchenko
99	FW	RUS	Denis Gaysin

=== Out on Loan ===
Note: Flags indicate national team as defined under FIFA eligibility rules; some limited exceptions apply. Players may hold more than one non-FIFA nationality.

No.	Pos.	Nation	Player
7	MF	RUS	Nikita Bezlikhotnov (at Baltika Kaliningrad)
27	MF	JPN	Takafumi Akahoshi (at Pogoń Szczecin)

No.	Pos.	Nation	Player
49	MF	RUS	Aleksandr Vasilyev (at Tyumen)

== Transfers ==
=== Summer ===
In: Note: Flags indicate national team as defined under FIFA eligibility rules; some limited exceptions apply. Players may hold more than one non-FIFA nationality.

No.	Pos.	Nation	Player
5	MF	GHA	Emmanuel Frimpong (from (England) Barnsley)
7	MF	RUS	Nikita Bezlikhotnov (from (Russia) Kuban Krasnodar)
9	FW	BIH	Haris Handžić (from (Bosnia and Herzegovina) Borac Banja Luka)
10	MF	BRA	Marcinho (from (Bulgaria) CSKA Sofia)
16	GK	BLR	Syarhey Vyeramko (from (Russia) Krylia Sovetov Samara)
19	MF	CRO	Ivan Paurević (from (Germany) Fortuna Düsseldorf)
20	MF	RUS	Denis Tumasyan (on loan from (Russia) Ural Sverdlovsk Oblast)
22	MF	UZB	Vagiz Galiullin (from (Russia) Rubin Kazan)
27	MF	JPN	Takafumi Akahoshi (from (Poland) Pogoń Szczecin)
28	DF	CRC	Felicio Brown Forbes (from (Russia) Krylia Sovetov Samara)
30	GK	RUS	Viktor Yanbarisov
40	MF	RUS	Ilya Sevastyanov
44	MF	RUS	Timur Gogolidze
47	DF	RUS	Vladislav Filippov
48	DF	RUS	Vyacheslav Morozov
49	MF	RUS	Aleksandr Vasilyev (from (Russia) Rostov)
50	MF	RUS	Sergei Tamrazov
51	GK	RUS	Artur Rozyyev
55	DF	RUS	Stanislav Bugayev
60	FW	RUS	Vladlen Khalfin
75	FW	RUS	Almaz Salmanov
78	FW	RUS	Aleksandr Ponomaryov
79	DF	RUS	Oleg Kupryakov
80	MF	RUS	Denis Gilmanov
81	DF	BLR	Dmitry Verkhovtsov (from (Russia) Krylia Sovetov Samara)
85	DF	RUS	Erik Salikhov
87	MF	RUS	Igor Bezdenezhnykh
89	MF	RUS	Kirill Panchikhin
90	DF	RUS	Artur Shaybekov
91	MF	RUS	Rudolf Gabidullin
94	DF	RUS	Eduard Shaykhutdinov
95	MF	RUS	Sergei Krechetov
96	FW	RUS	Arsen Benifand
97	FW	RUS	Danil Shakirov
98	FW	RUS	Ilmir Yakupov

Out: Note: Flags indicate national team as defined under FIFA eligibility rules; some limited exceptions apply. Players may hold more than one non-FIFA nationality.

No.	Pos.	Nation	Player
5	DF	KGZ	Valerii Kichin (end of loan from (Russia) Volga Nizhny Novgorod)
7	MF	RUS	Nikolai Zhilyayev (to (Russia) Fakel Voronezh)
10	MF	RUS	Artur Valikayev (to (Russia) Tom Tomsk)
12	FW	RUS	Anton Zabolotny (on loan to (Russia) Tyumen)
16	GK	RUS	Mikhail Baranovskiy (to (Russia) Kaluga)
17	DF	RUS	Aleksandr Vasilenko (to (Russia) Fakel Voronezh)
19	DF	RUS	Yevgeni Osipov (to (Russia) Arsenal Tula)
22	GK	RUS	Dmitry Izotov
30	MF	RUS	Ivan Nagibin (to (Russia) Sibir Novosibirsk)
36	DF	RUS	Dmitri Grachyov (to (Russia) Luch-Energiya Vladivostok)
88	DF	RUS	Andrei Kireyev (to (Russia) Fakel Voronezh)
—	FW	RUS	Vitali Galysh (to (Russia) Yenisey Krasnoyarsk, previously on loan)
—	FW	RUS	Andrei Myazin (to (Russia) Luch-Energiya Vladivostok, previously on loan to (Russia) Rotor Volgograd)

=== Winter ===
In: Note: Flags indicate national team as defined under FIFA eligibility rules; some limited exceptions apply. Players may hold more than one non-FIFA nationality.

No.	Pos.	Nation	Player
17	MF	UKR	Oleksandr Zinchenko (from (Ukraine) Shakhtar Donetsk)
39	MF	RUS	Dmitri Stotskiy (from (Russia) Baltika Kaliningrad)
57	DF	RUS	Ruslan Khaziyev (from (Russia) Ufa-2)
63	MF	RUS	Radmir Zaripov (from (Russia) Ufa-2)
66	FW	RUS	Ilya Blinnikov (from (Russia) Zenit Salavat)
74	DF	RUS	Dmitri Pavlov (from (Russia) DYuSSh-Olimpiyets-D Nizhny Novgorod)
88	FW	RUS	Igor Shevchenko (from (Russia) Torpedo Moscow)

Out: Note: Flags indicate national team as defined under FIFA eligibility rules; some limited exceptions apply. Players may hold more than one non-FIFA nationality.

No.	Pos.	Nation	Player
6	MF	BRA	William
7	MF	RUS	Nikita Bezlikhotnov (on loan to (Russia) Baltika Kaliningrad)
27	MF	JPN	Takafumi Akahoshi (on loan to (Poland) Pogoń Szczecin)
49	FW	RUS	Aleksandr Vasilyev (on loan to (Russia) Tyumen)
77	FW	RUS	Bulat Khayernasov

== Competitions ==
=== Russian Premier League ===
==== Results by round ====
Round	1	2	3	4	5	6	7	8	9	10	11	12	13	14	15	16	17	18	19	20	21	22	23	24	25	26	27	28	29	30
Ground	A	A	H	A	H	A	A	H	A	H	H	A	H	A	A	A	A	A	H	H	H	A	H	H	H	H	A	H	A	H
Result	L	W	L	L	L	D	W	L	W	D	D	L	W	D	L	W	D	L	D	L	L	L	L	W	W	L	D	D	W	D
Position	11	9	10	11	13	11	11	11	11	10	10	11	11	11	11	11	11	11	11	11	11	13	15	14	12	12	12	14	12	12

Updated to match(es) played on 27 May 2015. Source: Russian Premier League
A = Away; H = Home; W = Win; D = Draw; L = Loss

==== Matches ====
3 August 2014 1	Kuban Krasnodar	2 – 0	Ufa	Krasnodar
21:30 YEKT (UTC+6)	Ignatyev 19'; Popov 6', 65' (pen.)	Summary	Stepanets (yellow card) 14' (yellow-red card) 90+2'	Stadium: Kuban Stadium; Attendance: 12,228; Referee: Aleksandr Egorov

8 August 2014 2	Amkar Perm'	0 – 1	Ufa	Perm
20:00 YEKT (UTC+6)		Summary	Marcinho 53' (pen.)	Stadium: Zvezda Stadium; Attendance: 3,000; Referee: Sergey Kulikov

13 August 2014 3	Ufa	0 – 2	Dynamo Moscow	Ufa
17:00 YEKT (UTC+6)		Summary	Samba 31'; Kurányi 61'	Stadium: Dynamo Stadium; Attendance: 6,200; Referee: Sergey Lapochkin

16 August 2014 4	Zenit St. Petersburg	1 – 0	Ufa	Saint Petersburg
22:00 YEKT (UTC+6)	Hulk 31' (pen.)	Summary		Stadium: Petrovsky Stadium; Referee: Vitaly Meshkov

23 August 2014 5	Ufa	1 – 2	Spartak Moscow	Perm
16:00 YEKT (UTC+6)	Diego 74'	Summary	Dzyuba 27', 34'	Stadium: Zvezda Stadium; Attendance: 5,100; Referee: Igor Nizovtsev

31 August 2014 6	Rubin Kazan	1 – 1	Ufa	Kazan
18:00 YEKT (UTC+6)	Kanunnikov 44'	Summary	Marcinho 90+5'	Stadium: Kazan Arena; Attendance: 24,538; Referee: Kirill Levnikov

14 September 2014 7	Krasnodar	0 – 2	Ufa	Krasnodar
21:00 YEKT (UTC+6)		Summary	Marcinho 7'; Alikin 53'	Stadium: Kuban Stadium; Attendance: 7,856; Referee: Alexey Nikolaev

20 September 2014 8	Ufa	0 – 1	Ural	Ufa
14:00 YEKT (UTC+6)		Summary	Yerokhin 42'	Stadium: Dynamo Stadium; Attendance: 4,000; Referee: Vladimir Moskalyov

27 September 2014 9	Mordovia Saransk	0 – 2	Ufa	Saransk
18:00 YEKT (UTC+6)		Summary	Semakin 64'; Handžić 84' (pen.)	Stadium: Start Stadium; Attendance: 3,762; Referee: Mikhail Vilkov

20 October 2014 10	Ufa	1 – 1	Torpedo Moscow	Ufa
19:00 YEKT (UTC+6)	Handžić 25'	Summary	Bilyaletdinov 86'	Stadium: Dynamo Stadium; Attendance: 2,800; Referee: Sergey Kulikov

26 October 2014 11	Ufa	3 – 3	CSKA Moscow	Perm
15:30 YEKT (UTC+5)	Forbes 12' (yellow card) 90+3'; Paurević (yellow card) 35'; Semakin 50'; Safronidi 87'	Summary	Berezutski 43'; Natcho 59' (pen.), 90+4' (pen.); Wernbloom (yellow card) 85'	Stadium: Zvezda Stadium; Attendance: 1,600; Referee: Sergey Ivanov

3 November 2014 12	Terek Grozny	1 – 0	Ufa	Grozny
21:00 YEKT (UTC+5)	Bokila 45+2'	Summary	Tumasyan (yellow card) 27' (yellow-red card) 85'	Stadium: Akhmat-Arena; Attendance: 14,320; Referee: Igor Fedotov

9 November 2014 13	Ufa	0 – 0	Rostov	Perm
17:00 YEKT (UTC+5)		Summary		Stadium: Zvezda Stadium; Attendance: 400; Referee: Alexey Nikolaev

24 November 2014 14	Lokomotiv Moscow	0 – 0	Ufa	Moscow
21:00 YEKT (UTC+5)		Summary		Stadium: Lokomotiv Stadium; Attendance: 6,800; Referee: Igor Nizovtsev

29 November 2014 15	CSKA Moscow	5 – 0	Ufa	Khimki
17:45 YEKT (UTC+5)	Schennikov (yellow card) 34'; Natcho 35'; Tošić 41', 56'; Doumbia 60'; Musa 88'	Summary		Stadium: Arena Khimki; Attendance: 6,000; Referee: Vitaly Meshkov

2 December 2014 16	Arsenal Tula	0 – 1	Ufa	Tula
21:00 YEKT (UTC+5)	Zotov (yellow card) 55'; Osipov (yellow card) 83'	Summary	Handžić 22' (yellow card) 53'; Frimpong (yellow card) 54'; Marcinho (yellow card) 63'	Stadium: Arsenal Stadium; Attendance: 2,100; Referee: Aleksey Eskov

8 December 2014 17	Torpedo Moscow	2 – 2	Ufa	Ramensky District
19:00 YEKT (UTC+5)	Putsila 40'; Novoseltsev (yellow card) 57'; Mirzov 65'	Summary	Diego 20'; Tishkin (red card) 22'; Tumasyan 37'	Stadium: Saturn Stadium; Attendance: 1,050; Referee: Alexey Nikolaev

9 March 2015 18	Dynamo Moscow	3 – 1	Ufa	Khimki
18:00 YEKT (UTC+5)	Ionov 10'; Valbuena 19'; Kurányi 72'	Summary	Marcinho 29' (pen.); Zaseyev (yellow card) 63'	Stadium: Arena Khimki; Attendance: 15,000; Referee: Vladimir Moskalyov

14 March 2015 19	Ufa	1 – 1	Amkar Perm'	Saransk
15:00 YEKT (UTC+5)	Frimpong (yellow card) 17'; Shevchenko 72'; Tishkin (yellow card) 90+2'	Summary	Ogude (yellow card) 19'; Prudnikov 85'	Stadium: Start Stadium (Saransk); Attendance: 1,162; Referee: Sergey Karasev

20 March 2015 20	Ufa	0 – 2	Krasnodar	Ufa
19:00 YEKT (UTC+5)	Paurević (yellow card) 14'; Alikin (yellow card) 34'; Zaseyev (yellow card) 58'; Tumasyan (yellow card) 72'	Summary	Kaleshin 25' (yellow card) 41'; Ari 53'	Stadium: Dynamo Stadium; Attendance: 3,087; Referee: Aleksey Eskov

5 April 2015 21	Ufa	0 – 1	Terek Grozny	Saransk
20:00 YEKT (UTC+5)	Zaseyev (yellow card) 39'; Safronidi (yellow card) 59'	Summary	Komorowski 67'; Rybus (yellow card) 73'; Kanu (yellow card) 90+3'	Stadium: Start Stadium; Attendance: 1,243; Referee: (Russia) Sergey Kostevich

9 April 2015 22	Rostov	2 – 0	Ufa	Rostov-on-Don
22:00 YEKT (UTC+5)	Bukharov (yellow card) 73' (goal) 88'; Azmoun 78'	Summary	Zaseyev (yellow card) 55'; Sukhov (yellow card) 62'; Paurević (yellow card) 75'	Stadium: Olimp-2; Attendance: 7,000; Referee: Sergey Lapochkin

12 April 2015 23	Ufa	0 – 1	Arsenal Tula	Saransk
18:00 YEKT (UTC+5)		Summary	Karytska 33'; Zotov (yellow card) 78'	Stadium: Start Stadium; Attendance: 1,768; Referee: Aleksey Eskov

18 April 2015 24	Ufa	1 – 0	Lokomotiv Moscow	Perm
15:00 YEKT (UTC+5)	Stotskiy (yellow card) 35'; Paurević 50'; Alikin (yellow card) 79'; Safronidi (yellow card) 90+4'	Summary	Tarasov (yellow card) 28' (yellow-red card) 90+2'; Shishkin (yellow card) 64'	Stadium: Zvezda Stadium; Attendance: 700; Referee: Igor Nizovtsev

24 April 2015 25	Ufa	3 – 2	Kuban Krasnodar	Perm
18:00 YEKT (UTC+5)	Tumasyan 25'; Shevchenko (yellow card) 81'; Marcinho 89' (pen.); Alikin 90+3'	Summary	Kulik (yellow card) 60'; Ignatyev 62'; Baldé 79'; Bugayev (yellow card) 89'; Rabiu (yellow card) 90+1'	Stadium: Zvezda Stadium; Attendance: 2,500; Referee: Vitaly Rushakov

4 May 2015 26	Ufa	1 – 2	Mordovia Saransk	Perm
15:00 YEKT (UTC+5)	Marcinho 18'	Summary	Perendija 22' (yellow card) 90+4'; Ebecilio (yellow card) 35' (goal) 62'; Shitov (yellow card) 83'; Lutsenko (yellow card) 85'; Kochenkov (yellow card) 90'	Stadium: Zvezda Stadium; Attendance: 200; Referee: Vladislav Bezborodov

8 May 2015 27	Ural	1 – 1	Ufa	Tyumen
18:30 MSK (UTC+4)	Yemelyanov (yellow card) 45'; Khozin 46'; Novikov (yellow card) 79'	Summary	Golubov (yellow card) 27'; Paurević (yellow card) 30'; Alikin 32' (yellow card) 77'; Yurchenko (yellow card) 86'; Verkhovtsov (yellow card) 90+3'	Stadium: Geolog Stadium; Attendance: 1,500; Referee: Kirill Levnikov

17 May 2015 28	Ufa	1 – 1	Zenit St.Petersburg	Saint Petersburg
18:00 YEKT (UTC+5)	Diego (yellow card) 44'; Verkhovtsov (yellow card) 84'; Handžić (yellow card) 87'	Summary	Hulk 32' (yellow card) 65'; Shatov (yellow card) 39'; Danny (yellow card) 43'	Stadium: Petrovsky Stadium; Attendance: 16,925; Referee: Vladimir Moskalyov

23 May 2015 29	Spartak Moscow	1 – 2	Ufa	Moscow
20:00 YEKT (UTC+5)	Krotov (yellow card) 21' (goal) 27'; Rômulo (yellow card) 46' (yellow-red card) 67'; Ebert (yellow card) 70'; Tasci (yellow card) 88'	Summary	Sukhov (yellow card) 7'; Paurević 22' (yellow card) 74'; Alikin (yellow card) 34'; Stotskiy 40'	Stadium: Otkrytie Arena; Attendance: 12,326; Referee: Igor Nizovtsev

31 May 2015 30	Ufa	1 – 1	FC Rubin Kazan	Perm
15:30 YEKT (UTC+5)	Stotsky 33'; Sukhov (yellow card) 47'; Safronidi (yellow card) 52'; Paurević (yellow card) 64'; Diego (yellow card) 90'	Summary	Kuzmin (yellow card) 45+2'; Karadeniz 65' (yellow card) 85'; Kvirkvelia (yellow card) 87'; Kambolov (yellow card) 90+3'	Stadium: Zvezda Stadium; Attendance: 2,560; Referee: Alexey Nikolaev

==== League table ====
Pos	Team	Pld	W	D	L	GF	GA	GD	Pts	Qualification or relegation
10	Kuban Krasnodar	30	8	12	10	32	36	−4	36	
11	Amkar Perm	30	8	8	14	25	42	−17	32	
12	Ufa	30	7	10	13	26	39	−13	31	
13	Ural Sverdlovsk Oblast (O)	30	9	3	18	31	44	−13	30	Qualification for the Relegation play-offs
14	Rostov (O)	30	7	8	15	27	51	−24	29	Qualification for the Relegation play-offs

Source: Russian Premier League
Rules for classification: 1) points; 2) number of matches won; 3) head-to-head points; 4) head-to-head wins; 5) head-to-head goal difference; 6) head-to-head goals; 7) number of head-to-head away goals; 8) goal difference; 9) number of goals scored; 10) number of away goals scored
(O) Play-off winners

=== Russian Cup ===
24 September 2014 Round of 32	Yenisey	2 – 3 (a.e.t.)	Ufa	Krasnoyarsk
17:00 YEKT (UTC+6)	Y.Markov 30' (pen.); Marushchak 89'	Summary	Handžić 2', 8'; Sukhov 103'	Stadium: Central Stadium; Attendance: 3,100; Referee: Denis Shpilev

29 October 2014 Round of 16	Ufa	0 – 1	Lokomotiv Moscow	Ufa
19:00 YEKT (UTC+5)	Sukhov (yellow card) 23'; Zaseyev (yellow card) 57'; Kilin (yellow card) 69'	Summary	Boussoufa 19'	Stadium: Dynamo Stadium; Attendance: 3,600; Referee: Vladimir Moskalyov

== Squad statistics ==
As of match played 30 May 2015

=== Appearances and goals ===
No.	Pos	Nat	Player	Total		Premier League		Russian Cup	
No.	Pos	Nat	Player	Apps	Goals	Apps	Goals	Apps	Goals
1	GK	(Russia) RUS	David Yurchenko	25	0	25	0	0	0
3	DF	(Russia) RUS	Pavel Alikin	21	3	21	3	0	0
4	DF	(Ukraine) UKR	Pavlo Stepanets	11	0	8+2	0	1	0
5	MF	(Ghana) GHA	Emmanuel Frimpong	19	0	13+4	0	2	0
9	FW	(Bosnia and Herzegovina) BIH	Haris Handžić	31	6	21+8	4	2	2
10	MF	(Brazil) BRA	Marcinho	28	6	27+1	6	0	0
11	FW	(Brazil) BRA	Diego Carlos	20	2	12+7	2	1	0
13	MF	(Russia) RUS	Azamat Zaseyev	30	0	28	0	2	0
14	MF	(Russia) RUS	Maksim Semakin	21	2	18+3	2	0	0
16	GK	(Belarus) BLR	Syarhey Vyeramko	7	0	5	0	2	0
17	MF	(Ukraine) UKR	Oleksandr Zinchenko	7	0	2+5	0	0	0
18	FW	(Russia) RUS	Dmitri Golubov	8	0	4+4	0	0	0
19	MF	(Croatia) CRO	Ivan Paurević	31	2	28+1	2	2	0
20	DF	(Russia) RUS	Denis Tumasyan	23	2	20+1	2	2	0
22	MF	(Uzbekistan) UZB	Vagiz Galiullin	24	0	19+4	0	1	0
23	MF	(Russia) RUS	Anton Kilin	8	0	1+5	0	0+2	0
28	DF	(Costa Rica) CRC	Brown Forbes	10	1	7+2	1	0+1	0
31	DF	(Russia) RUS	Maksim Tishkin	21	0	19	0	2	0
33	DF	(Russia) RUS	Aleksandr Sukhov	23	0	20+1	0	2	0
39	MF	(Russia) RUS	Dmitri Stotskiy	10	2	10	2	0	0
70	MF	(Russia) RUS	Nikolai Safronidi	25	1	10+13	1	1+1	0
81	DF	(Belarus) BLR	Dmitry Verkhovtsov	12	0	7+4	0	1	0
87	MF	(Russia) RUS	Igor Bezdenezhnykh	1	0	0+1	0	0	0
88	FW	(Russia) RUS	Igor Shevchenko	11	1	2+9	1	0	0
Players away from the club on loan:
7	MF	(Russia) RUS	Nikita Bezlikhotnov	5	0	0+4	0	1	0
27	MF	(Japan) JPN	Takafumi Akahoshi	3	0	1+1	0	0+1	0
49	MF	(Russia) RUS	Aleksandr Vasilyev	10	1	0+9	0	0+1	1
Players who appeared for Ufa no longer at the club:
6	MF	(Brazil) BRA	William	1	0	1	0	0	0

=== Goal Scorers ===
Place	Position	Nation	Number	Name	Russian Premier League	Russian Cup	Total
1	MF	(Brazil)	10	Marcinho	6	0	6
1	FW	(Bosnia and Herzegovina)	9	Haris Handžić	4	2	6
3	DF	(Russia)	3	Pavel Alikin	3	0	3
4	MF	(Russia)	14	Maksim Semakin	2	0	2
4	FW	(Brazil)	11	Diego Carlos	2	0	2
4	DF	(Russia)	20	Denis Tumasyan	2	0	2
4	MF	(Croatia)	19	Ivan Paurević	2	0	2
4	MF	(Russia)	39	Dmitri Stotskiy	2	0	2
9	MF	(Russia)	49	Aleksandr Vasilyev	0	1	1
9	DF	(Costa Rica)	28	Brown Forbes	1	0	1
9	MF	(Russia)	70	Nikolai Safronidi	1	0	1
9	FW	(Russia)	88	Igor Shevchenko	1	0	1
				TOTALS	25	3	28

=== Disciplinary record ===
Number	Nation	Position	Name	Russian Premier League		Russian Cup		Total	
Number	Nation	Position	Name	Yellow card	Red card	Yellow card	Red card	Yellow card	Red card
1	(Russia)	GK	David Yurchenko	2	0	0	0	2	0
3	(Russia)	DF	Pavel Alikin	5	0	0	0	5	0
4	(Ukraine)	DF	Pavlo Stepanets	3	1	0	0	3	1
5	(Ghana)	MF	Emmanuel Frimpong	5	0	0	0	5	0
9	(Bosnia and Herzegovina)	FW	Haris Handžić	3	0	1	0	4	0
10	(Brazil)	MF	Marcinho	4	0	0	0	4	0
11	(Brazil)	FW	Diego Carlos	2	0	0	0	2	0
13	(Russia)	MF	Azamat Zaseyev	7	0	1	0	8	0
14	(Russia)	MF	Maksim Semakin	1	0	0	0	1	0
18	(Russia)	FW	Dmitri Golubov	1	0	0	0	1	0
19	(Croatia)	MF	Ivan Paurević	7	0	0	0	7	0
20	(Russia)	DF	Denis Tumasyan	5	1	0	0	5	1
22	(Uzbekistan)	MF	Vagiz Galiullin	1	0	0	0	1	0
23	(Russia)	MF	Anton Kilin	0	0	2	0	2	0
28	(Costa Rica)	DF	Brown Forbes	2	0	0	0	2	0
31	(Russia)	DF	Maksim Tishkin	6	1	1	0	7	1
33	(Russia)	DF	Aleksandr Sukhov	4	0	1	0	5	0
39	(Russia)	MF	Dmitri Stotskiy	1	0	0	0	1	0
49	(Russia)	MF	Aleksandr Vasilyev	1	0	0	0	1	0
70	(Russia)	MF	Nikolai Safronidi	4	0	0	0	4	0
81	(Belarus)	DF	Dmitry Verkhovtsov	2	0	0	0	2	0
88	(Russia)	FW	Igor Shevchenko	1	0	0	0	1	0
			TOTALS	67	3	6	0	73	3

== Notes ==
- YEKT time changed from UTC+6 to UTC+5 permanently on 26 October 2014.
