= 2015–16 FC Ufa season =

FC Ufa
2015–16 season
- Chairman: Marat Magadeyev
- Manager: Yevgeni Perevertailo
- Stadium: Dynamo Stadium/Zvezda Stadium
- Russian Premier League: 12th
- Russian Cup: Quarterfinal vs CSKA Moscow
- Top goalscorer: League: Sylvester Igboun (4); All: Two Players (4)
| Home colours | Away colours |

The 2015–16 FC Ufa season was the club's 2nd season in the Russian Premier League, the highest tier of association football in Russia, and 5th in total. Ufa will also be taking part in the Russian Cup.

== Squad ==
Note: Flags indicate national team as defined under FIFA eligibility rules; some limited exceptions apply. Players may hold more than one non-FIFA nationality.

| No. | Pos. | Nation | Player |
|---|---|---|---|
| 2 | DF | UKR | Oleksandr Filin |
| 3 | DF | RUS | Pavel Alikin |
| 4 | DF | RUS | Aleksei Nikitin |
| 6 | FW | GER | Marvin Pourié (on loan from F.C. Copenhagen) |
| 7 | DF | RUS | Yevgeni Osipov |
| 8 | MF | RUS | Semyon Fomin |
| 9 | FW | BIH | Haris Handžić |
| 10 | MF | BRA | Marcinho |
| 11 | FW | BRA | Diego Carlos |
| 13 | MF | RUS | Azamat Zaseyev |
| 17 | MF | UKR | Oleksandr Zinchenko |
| 19 | MF | CRO | Ivan Paurević |
| 20 | DF | RUS | Denis Tumasyan |

| No. | Pos. | Nation | Player |
|---|---|---|---|
| 31 | FW | RUS | Dmitri Sysuyev |
| 33 | DF | RUS | Aleksandr Sukhov |
| 34 | DF | RUS | Aleksandr Katsalapov |
| 39 | MF | RUS | Dmitri Stotskiy |
| 42 | GK | RUS | Sergei Narubin |
| 44 | MF | NGR | Sylvester Igboun |
| 60 | MF | RUS | Vladimir Zubarev |
| 70 | MF | RUS | Nikolai Safronidi |
| 71 | GK | RUS | Andrei Lunev |
| 87 | MF | RUS | Igor Bezdenezhnykh |
| 88 | GK | RUS | Giorgi Shelia |
| 93 | FW | RUS | Vyacheslav Krotov |

=== Youth team ===
Note: Flags indicate national team as defined under FIFA eligibility rules; some limited exceptions apply. Players may hold more than one non-FIFA nationality.

| No. | Pos. | Nation | Player |
|---|---|---|---|
| 50 | MF | RUS | Sergei Tamrazov |
| 51 | MF | RUS | Mark Krivorog |
| 52 | GK | RUS | Ruslan Agaev |
| 54 | GK | RUS | Yegor Pozdnyakov |
| 53 | GK | RUS | Gleb Yefimov |
| 55 | MF | RUS | Artur Sitdikov |
| 57 | DF | RUS | Ruslan Khaziyev |
| 63 | MF | RUS | Radmir Zaripov |
| 65 | MF | RUS | Maksim Lysenkov |
| 66 | FW | RUS | Ilya Blinnikov |
| 74 | DF | RUS | Dmitriy Pavlov |

| No. | Pos. | Nation | Player |
|---|---|---|---|
| 75 | DF | RUS | Ilya Ponomaryov |
| 77 | FW | RUS | Denis Zizenkov |
| 79 | MF | RUS | Al-Khan Samba |
| 80 | MF | RUS | Andranik Mnatsakanyan |
| 83 | DF | RUS | Yegor Romanovskiy |
| 85 | DF | RUS | Erik Salikhov |
| 90 | FW | RUS | Vyacheslav Zhuravlyov |
| 94 | MF | RUS | Azat Valimkhametov |
| 95 | MF | RUS | Sergei Krechetov |
| 98 | DF | RUS | Igor Diveyev |
| 99 | FW | RUS | Danila Yemelyanov |

=== Out on Loan ===
Note: Flags indicate national team as defined under FIFA eligibility rules; some limited exceptions apply. Players may hold more than one non-FIFA nationality.

| No. | Pos. | Nation | Player |
|---|---|---|---|
| 1 | GK | RUS | David Yurchenko (at Anzhi Makhachkala until end of season 2015/2016) |
| 14 | MF | RUS | Maksim Semakin (at Luch-Energiya Vladivostok until end of season 2015/2016) |

| No. | Pos. | Nation | Player |
|---|---|---|---|
| 18 | FW | RUS | Dmitri Golubov (at Tom Tomsk until end of season 2015/2016) |

== Transfers ==
=== Summer ===
In: Note: Flags indicate national team as defined under FIFA eligibility rules; some limited exceptions apply. Players may hold more than one non-FIFA nationality.

| No. | Pos. | Nation | Player |
|---|---|---|---|
| 2 | DF | UKR | Oleksandr Filin (from (Ukraine) Shakhtar Donetsk youth team) |
| 4 | DF | RUS | Aleksei Nikitin (from (Russia) Amkar Perm) |
| 6 | FW | GER | Marvin Pourié (on loan from (Denmark) Copenhagen) |
| 7 | DF | RUS | Yevgeni Osipov (from (Russia) Arsenal Tula) |
| 8 | MF | RUS | Semyon Fomin (from (Russia) Torpedo Moscow) |
| 20 | DF | RUS | Denis Tumasyan (from (Russia) Ural Sverdlovsk Oblast, previously on loan) |
| 34 | DF | RUS | Aleksandr Katsalapov (from (Russia) Torpedo Moscow) |
| 42 | GK | RUS | Sergei Narubin (from (Russia) Tosno) |
| 44 | MF | NGR | Sylvester Igboun (from (Denmark) Midtjylland) |
| 53 | GK | RUS | Gleb Yefimov (from (Russia) Akademiya Ufa) |
| 65 | MF | RUS | Maksim Lysenkov (from (Russia) Ufa-2) |
| 71 | GK | RUS | Andrey Lunyov (from (Russia) Saturn Ramenskoye) |
| 79 | MF | RUS | Vadim Solovey |
| 80 | MF | RUS | Andranik Mnatsakanyan (from (Russia) Ufa-2) |
| 82 | MF | RUS | Rinat Kireyev (from (Russia) Ufa-2) |
| 83 | DF | RUS | Yegor Romanovsky (from (Russia) Akademiya Ufa) |
| 84 | MF | RUS | Maksim Molchanov |
| 90 | FW | RUS | Vyacheslav Zhuravlyov (from (Russia) Ufa-2) |
| 93 | FW | RUS | Vyacheslav Krotov (from (Russia) Spartak Moscow) |
| 94 | MF | RUS | Azat Valimkhametov (from (Russia) Ufa-2) |
| 97 | MF | RUS | Andrei Stepanov (from (Russia) Ufa-2) |

Out: Note: Flags indicate national team as defined under FIFA eligibility rules; some limited exceptions apply. Players may hold more than one non-FIFA nationality.

| No. | Pos. | Nation | Player |
|---|---|---|---|
| 4 | MF | UKR | Pavlo Stepanets (to (Russia) Fakel Voronezh) |
| 16 | GK | BLR | Syarhey Vyeramko (end of loan from (Russia) Krylia Sovetov Samara) |
| 18 | FW | RUS | Dmitry Golubov (on loan to (Russia) Tom Tomsk) |
| 23 | FW | RUS | Anton Kilin (to (Russia) KAMAZ Naberezhnye Chelny) |
| 28 | DF | CRC | Felicio Brown Forbes (released, May 2015) |
| 30 | GK | RUS | Viktor Yanbarisov (to (Russia) Ararat Ufa) |
| 31 | DF | RUS | Maksim Tishkin (to (Russia) Mordovia Saransk) |
| 40 | MF | RUS | Ilya Sevastyanov (to (Russia) Metallurg Asha) |
| 44 | MF | RUS | Timur Gogolidze |
| 47 | DF | RUS | Vladislav Filippov |
| 55 | DF | RUS | Stanislav Bugayev (to (Russia) Ararat Ufa) |
| 60 | FW | RUS | Vladlen Khalfin |
| 71 | GK | RUS | Artyom Leonov (released) |
| 79 | DF | RUS | Oleg Kupryakov (to (Russia) Ararat Ufa) |
| 80 | MF | RUS | Denis Gilmanov |
| 88 | FW | RUS | Igor Shevchenko |
| 90 | DF | RUS | Artur Shaybekov |
| 91 | MF | RUS | Rudolf Gabidullin |
| 92 | MF | RUS | Marat Atlukhanov |
| 93 | MF | RUS | Ruslan Akbashev |
| 94 | DF | RUS | Eduard Shaykhutdinov (to (Russia) Ararat Ufa) |
| 97 | FW | RUS | Danil Shakirov |
| 98 | FW | RUS | Ilmir Yakupov (to (Russia) Sibir Novosibirsk) |
| 99 | FW | RUS | Denis Gaysin (to (Russia) Ararat Ufa) |
| — | MF | JPN | Takafumi Akahoshi (to (Poland) Pogoń Szczecin, previously on loan) |
| — | MF | RUS | Nikita Bezlikhotnov (on loan to (Russia) SKA-Energiya Khabarovsk, previously on loan to (Russia) Baltika Kaliningrad) |
| — | MF | RUS | Aleksandr Vasilyev (on loan to (Russia) Torpedo Armavir, previously on loan to (Russia) Tyumen) |

=== Winter ===
In: Note: Flags indicate national team as defined under FIFA eligibility rules; some limited exceptions apply. Players may hold more than one non-FIFA nationality.

| No. | Pos. | Nation | Player |
|---|---|---|---|
| 31 | FW | RUS | Dmitri Sysuyev (from (Russia) Mordovia Saransk) |
| 51 | MF | RUS | Mark Krivorog (from own academy) |
| 54 | GK | RUS | Yegor Pozdnyakov |
| 55 | MF | RUS | Artur Sitdikov (from (Russia) Akademiya Ufa) |
| 60 | MF | RUS | Vladimir Zubarev (from (Russia) Spartak Moscow) |
| 75 | DF | RUS | Ilya Ponomaryov |
| 77 | FW | RUS | Denis Zizenkov (from (Russia) UOR #5 Yegoryevsk) |
| 79 | MF | RUS | Al-Khan Samba (from (Russia) Sterlitamak) |
| 88 | GK | RUS | Giorgi Shelia (from (Russia) Yenisey Krasnoyarsk) |
| 98 | DF | RUS | Igor Diveyev |
| 99 | FW | RUS | Danila Yemelyanov |

Out: Note: Flags indicate national team as defined under FIFA eligibility rules; some limited exceptions apply. Players may hold more than one non-FIFA nationality.

| No. | Pos. | Nation | Player |
|---|---|---|---|
| 1 | GK | RUS | David Yurchenko (on loan to (Russia) Anzhi Makhachkala) |
| 5 | MF | GHA | Emmanuel Frimpong |
| 14 | MF | RUS | Maksim Semakin (on loan to (Russia) Luch-Energiya Vladivostok) |
| 22 | MF | UZB | Vagiz Galiulin (to (Russia) Tosno) |
| 48 | DF | RUS | Vyacheslav Morozov |
| 51 | GK | RUS | Artur Rozyev |
| 75 | FW | RUS | Almaz Salmanov |
| 78 | FW | RUS | Aleksandr Ponomaryov |
| 79 | MF | RUS | Vadim Solovey |
| 81 | DF | BLR | Dzmitry Verkhawtsow (to (Poland) Korona Kielce) |
| 82 | MF | RUS | Rinat Kireyev |
| 84 | MF | RUS | Maksim Molchanov |
| 89 | MF | RUS | Kirill Panchikhin |
| 96 | MF | RUS | Arsen Benifand |
| 97 | MF | RUS | Andrei Stepanov |

== Competitions ==
=== Russian Premier League ===
==== Matches ====
| 17 July 2015 1 | Spartak Moscow | 2 – 2 | Ufa | Moscow |
| 21:00 YEKT (UTC+5) | Tasci 24'; Zé Luís 79'; Bocchetti (yellow card) 90+2' | Summary | Handžić 12'; Paurević (yellow card) 17'; Frimpong (red card) 30'; Yurchenko (yellow card) 64'; Stotsky 67'; Zaseyev (yellow card) 80' | Stadium: Otkrytiye Arena; Attendance: 23,221; Referee: Vladimir Moskalyov |

| 25 July 2015 2 | Ufa | 1 – 2 | Rostov | Ufa |
| 18:00 YEKT (UTC+5) | Handžić (yellow card) 51'; Zinchenko 78' | Summary | Yoo 46'; Doumbia (yellow card) 63'; Bastos 87' | Stadium: Neftyanik Stadium; Attendance: 3,375; Referee: Sergey Kulikov |

| 31 July 2015 3 | Kuban Krasnodar | 1 – 1 | Ufa | Krasnodar |
| 22:00 YEKT (UTC+5) | Ignatyev 35'; Pavlyuchenko (yellow card) 41' | Summary | Igboun 51'; Zaseyev (yellow card) 53'; Sukhov (yellow card) 82' | Stadium: Kuban Stadium; Attendance: 6,548; Referee: Alexey Nikolaev |

| 9 August 2015 4 | Ufa | 0 – 1 | Zenit St.Petersburg | Ufa |
| 16:00 YEKT (UTC+5) | Frimpong (yellow card) 64'; Marcinho (yellow card) 73' | Summary | Danny 86' | Stadium: Neftyanik Stadium; Attendance: 14,200; Referee: Igor Fedotov |

| 17 August 2015 5 | Mordovia Saransk | 0 – 1 | Ufa | Saransk |
| 21:00 YEKT (UTC+5) | Stevanović (yellow card) 57'; Shitov (yellow card) 90+1' | Summary | Marcinho (yellow card) 58'; Stotsky 82' | Stadium: Start Stadium; Attendance: 1,200; Referee: Aleksey Eskov |

| 23 August 2015 6 | Ufa | 0 – 3 | Lokomotiv Moscow | Ufa |
| 15:30 YEKT (UTC+5) | Katsalapov (yellow card) 10'; Igboun (yellow card) 37' (yellow-red card) 57'; Zaseyev (yellow card) 52'; Tumasyan (yellow card) 62' | Summary | Niasse 6'; Kasaev 36'; Pejcinovic 80' | Stadium: Neftyanik Stadium; Attendance: 10,643; Referee: Vladimir Moskalyov |

| 29 August 2015 7 | Dynamo Moscow | 2 – 0 | Ufa | Khimki |
| 16:00 YEKT (UTC+5) | Kozlov 45+1'; Dyakov 58' (pen.) | Summary | Osipov (yellow card) 57' | Stadium: Arena Khimki; Attendance: 5,134; Referee: Sergey Kulikov |

| 14 September 2015 8 | Ufa | 0 – 1 | Ural | Ufa |
| 18:00 YEKT (UTC+5) | Zaseyev (yellow card) 70' | Summary | Acevedo 11'; Sapeta (yellow card) 42' | Stadium: Neftyanik Stadium; Attendance: 4,674; Referee: Sergey Kostevich |

| 19 September 2015 9 | Terek Grozny | 4 – 1 | Ufa | Grozny |
| 18:00 YEKT (UTC+5) | Maurício 10' (pen.), 36'; Ivanov (yellow card) 47'; Kudryashov (yellow card) 48'; Sadayev (yellow card) 56' (goal) 79'; Rybus 81' | Summary | Pourié (yellow card) 6'; Paurević (yellow card) 10'; Igboun 69' (pen.); Diego (yellow card) 82' | Stadium: Akhmat-Arena; Attendance: 13,740; Referee: Aleksei Matyunin |

| 26 September 2015 10 | Anzhi Makhachkala | 1 – 1 | Ufa | Kaspiysk |
| 18:30 YEKT (UTC+5) | Tagirbekov (yellow card) 46'; Ebecilio (yellow card) 81'; Almeida 84' | Summary | Yeshchenko 70' (o.g.); Fomin (yellow card) 88'; Galiulin (yellow card) 90'; Narubin (yellow card) 90+4' | Stadium: Anzhi Arena; Attendance: 8,201; Referee: Kirill Levnikov |

| 4 October 2015 11 | Ufa | 1 – 1 | Krasnodar | Ufa |
| 18:00 YEKT (UTC+5) | Fomin 49' (yellow card) 81'; Frimpong (yellow card) 71' (yellow-red card) 84'; Safronidi (yellow card) 90+4' | Summary | Mamayev 51'; Granqvist (yellow card) 57'; Jędrzejczyk (yellow card) 87' | Stadium: Neftyanik Stadium; Attendance: 6,350; Referee: Mikhail Vilkov |

| 17 October 2015 12 | Rubin Kazan | 3 – 1 | Ufa | Kazan |
| 21:00 YEKT (UTC+5) | Kuzmin 20', 78'; Kislyak 65' | Summary | Pourié 4'; Handžić (yellow card) 76' | Stadium: Kazan Arena; Attendance: 10,043; Referee: Vladislav Bezborodov |

| 23 October 2015 13 | Ufa | 1 – 0 | Krylia Sovetov | Ufa |
| 19:00 YEKT (UTC+5) | Fomin (yellow card) 76'; Alikin 79' | Summary | Gabulov (yellow card) 68'; Jahović (yellow card) 78'; Burlak (yellow card) 82' | Stadium: Neftyanik Stadium; Attendance: 6,300; Referee: Aleksei Matyunin |

| 31 October 2015 14 | CSKA Moscow | 2 – 0 | Ufa | Khimki |
| 15:30 YEKT (UTC+5) | Ignashevich 21' (pen.); Wernbloom (yellow card) 21'; Tošić 62' | Summary | Alikin (yellow card) 20' | Stadium: Arena Khimki; Attendance: 5,500; Referee: Vladimir Moskalyov |

| 7 November 2015 15 | Ufa | 2 – 1 | Amkar Perm | Ufa |
| 18:15 YEKT (UTC+5) | Igboun 47'; Krotov 88' | Summary | Ogude (yellow card) 59'; Salugin 68' | Stadium: Neftyanik Stadium; Attendance: 5,250; Referee: Sergey Lapochkin |

| 23 November 2015 16 | Rostov | 1 – 1 | Ufa | Rostov-on-Don |
| 21:00 YEKT (UTC+5) | Poloz 29' (pen.); Rotenberg (yellow card) 40'; Novoseltsev (yellow card) 80'; Navas (yellow card) 87' | Summary | Marcinho 55'; Zinchenko (yellow card) 88' | Stadium: Olimp-2; Attendance: 11,857; Referee: Aleksandr Egorov |

| 28 November 2015 17 | Ufa | 2 – 2 | Kuban Krasnodar | Ufa |
| 14:30 YEKT (UTC+5) | Krotov 19'; Paurević 90' | Summary | Ignatyev 12' (yellow card) 79'; Rabiu (yellow card) 29'; Khubulov 39' (yellow card) 56' | Stadium: Neftyanik Stadium; Attendance: 3,605; Referee: Kirill Levnikov |

| 3 December 2015 18 | Zenit St.Petersburg | 1 – 1 | Ufa | Saint Petersburg |
| 21:00 YEKT (UTC+5) | Criscito (yellow card) 8'; Danny (yellow card) 31'; Garay 86' (pen.) | Summary | Zinchenko 36'; Yurchenko (yellow card) 69'; Igboun (yellow card) 80'; Nikitin (yellow card) 85' | Stadium: Petrovsky Stadium; Attendance: 15,203; Referee: Igor Fedotov |

| 6 March 2016 19 | Ufa | 1 – 1 | Mordovia Saransk | Ufa |
| 16:30 YEKT (UTC+5) | Marcinho (yellow card) 49'; Zinchenko (yellow card) 57'; Nikitin 90+3' | Summary | Lomić 64' (pen.) (yellow card) 86'; Mukhametshin (yellow card) 76' | Stadium: Neftyanik Stadium; Attendance: 4,150; Referee: Sergei Ivanov |

| 13 March 2016 20 | Lokomotiv Moscow | 2 – 0 | Ufa | Moscow |
| 19:00 YEKT (UTC+5) | Ignatyev 56' (pen.); Samedov 90+2' | Summary | | Stadium: Lokomotiv Stadium; Attendance: 7,120; Referee: Kirill Levnikov |

| 19 March 2016 21 | Ufa | 0 – 1 | Dynamo Moscow | Ufa |
| 16:30 YEKT (UTC+5) | Diego (yellow card) 37' | Summary | Bećiraj 29' (yellow card) 84'; Hubočan (yellow card) 48' | Stadium: Neftyanik Stadium; Attendance: 3,330; Referee: Mikhail Vilkov |

| 2 April 2016 22 | Ural | 1 – 0 | Ufa | Yekaterinburg |
| 14:00 YEKT (UTC+5) | Gogniyev 24'; Yemelyanov (yellow card) 78' | Summary | Zubarev (yellow card) 47'; Igboun (yellow card) 60'; Handžić (yellow card) 89' | Stadium: SKB-Bank Arena; Attendance: 5,200; Referee: Sergey Karasev |

| 10 April 2016 23 | Ufa | 1 – 0 | Terek Grozny | Ufa |
| 16:30 YEKT (UTC+5) | Safronidi 36'; Igboun (yellow card) 52'; Zinchenko (yellow card) 69'; Diego (yellow card) 82' | Summary | Ivanov (yellow card) 41'; Wilkshire (yellow card) 50'; Semyonov (yellow card) 56'; Píriz (yellow card) 67' | Stadium: Neftyanik Stadium; Attendance: 6,900; Referee: Vladislav Bezborodov |

| 17 April 2016 24 | Ufa | 2 – 0 | Anzhi Makhachkala | Ufa |
| 16:30 YEKT (UTC+5) | Tumasyan 3'; Katsalapov (yellow card) 81'; Zubarev 90+3' | Summary | | Stadium: Dynamo Stadium; Attendance: 8,350; Referee: Sergei Ivanov |

| 24 April 2016 25 | Krasnodar | 4 – 0 | Ufa | Krasnodar |
| 16:30 YEKT (UTC+5) | Wánderson 35', 90'; Smolov 38'; Petrov 70' | Summary | Stotsky (yellow card) 46'; Paurević (yellow card) 82' | Stadium: Kuban Stadium; Attendance: 8,190; Referee: Sergey Lapochkin |

| 1 May 2016 26 | Ufa | 1 – 1 | Rubin Kazan | Ufa |
| 14:00 YEKT (UTC+5) | Sysuyev 21'; Igboun (yellow card) 53'; Stotsky (yellow card) 81' | Summary | Ozdoyev 43'; Kambolov (yellow card) 50' (yellow-red card) 63'; Caktaš (yellow card) 86' | Stadium: Dynamo Stadium; Attendance: 8,150; Referee: Sergey Karasev |

| 6 May 2016 27 | Krylia Sovetov | 1 – 0 | Ufa | Samara |
| 20:00 YEKT (UTC+5) | Yakovlev 6' (yellow card) 52'; Taranov (yellow card) 51'; Nadson (yellow card) 72' | Summary | Krotov (yellow card) 29'; Krotov (yellow card) 55' | Stadium: Metallurg Stadium; Attendance: 10,087; Referee: Vladislav Bezborodov |

| 11 May 2016 28 | Ufa | 1 – 3 | CSKA Moscow | Ufa |
| 19:00 YEKT (UTC+5) | Sysuyev 17'; Alikin (yellow card) 63'; Nikitin (yellow card) 84'; Paurević (yellow card) 84' | Summary | Dzagoev 14'; Wernbloom 61' (yellow card) 76'; Musa 70'; Berezutski (yellow card) 90+1' | Stadium: Neftyanik Stadium; Attendance: 10,460; Referee: Mikhail Vilkov |

| 16 May 2016 29 | Amkar Perm | 1 – 0 | Ufa | Perm |
| 19:00 YEKT (UTC+5) | Dzhikiya 82'; Butko (yellow card) 86'; Gol (yellow card) 88' | Summary | Sysuyev (yellow card) 15'; Handžić (yellow card) 87' | Stadium: Zvezda Stadium; Attendance: 6,750; Referee: Aleksey Eskov |

| 21 May 2016 30 | Ufa | 3 – 1 | Spartak Moscow | Ufa |
| 15:30 YEKT (UTC+5) | Paurević 1', 68'; Igboun 12' (pen.); Katsalapov (yellow card) 39'; Sysuyev (yellow card) 74'; Bezdenezhnykh (yellow card) 89'; Marcinho (yellow card) 90' | Summary | Melgarejo 9'; Bryzgalov (yellow card) 57' | Stadium: Neftyanik Stadium; Attendance: 10,150; Referee: Vitaly Meshkov |

==== League table ====
| Pos | Team | Pld | W | D | L | GF | GA | GD | Pts | Qualification or relegation |
|---|---|---|---|---|---|---|---|---|---|---|
| 10 | Rubin Kazan | 30 | 9 | 6 | 15 | 33 | 39 | −6 | 33 | |
| 11 | Amkar Perm | 30 | 7 | 10 | 13 | 22 | 33 | −11 | 31 | |
| 12 | Ufa | 30 | 6 | 9 | 15 | 25 | 44 | −19 | 27 | |
| 13 | Anzhi Makhachkala (O) | 30 | 6 | 8 | 16 | 28 | 50 | −22 | 26 | Qualification for the Relegation play-offs |
| 14 | Kuban Krasnodar (R) | 30 | 5 | 11 | 14 | 34 | 44 | −10 | 26 | Qualification for the Relegation play-offs |

Source: Russian Premier League, Soccerway
Rules for classification: 1) Points; 2) Matches won; 3) Head-to-head points; 4) Head-to-head matches won; 5) Head-to-head goal difference; 6) Head-to-head goals scored; 7) Head-to-head away goals; 8) Goal difference; 9) Goals scored; 10) Away goals scored.
(O) Play-off winners; (R) Relegated

=== Russian Cup ===
| 23 September 2015 Round of 32 | Sakhalin Yuzhno-Sakhalinsk | 0 – 4 | Ufa | Yuzhno-Sakhalinsk |
| 14:00 YEKT (UTC+5) | Yarkin (yellow card) 17'; Gagloyev (yellow card) 67' | Summary | Zaseyev 18'; Krotov 25', 73'; Safronidi (yellow card) 32'; Marcinho (yellow card) 42'; Fomin (yellow card) 45' (goal) 90+2'; Paurević (yellow card) 68' | Stadium: Spartak Stadium; Attendance: 3,800; Referee: Andrey Fisenko |

| 28 October 2015 Round of 16 | Ufa | 1 – 0 | SKA-Energiya Khabarovsk | Ufa |
| 18:00 YEKT (UTC+5) | Filin (yellow card) 42'; Pourié 65'; Galiulin (yellow card) 67' | Summary | Kireyev (yellow card) 53'; Popov (yellow card) 90+3' | Stadium: Neftyanik; Attendance: 3,450; Referee: Vladimir Seldyakov |

| 1 March 2016 Quarterfinal | Ufa | 0 – 2 | CSKA Moscow | Ufa |
| 18:00 YEKT (UTC+5) | | Summary | Berezutski (yellow card) 55'; Shirokov 57'; Musa 75' | Stadium: Neftyanik Stadium; Attendance: 9,850; Referee: Sergey Lapochkin |

== Squad statistics ==
As of match played 21 May 2016

=== Appearances and goals ===
| No. | Pos | Nat | Player | Total | | Premier League | | Russian Cup | |
| No. | Pos | Nat | Player | Apps | Goals | Apps | Goals | Apps | Goals |
|---|---|---|---|---|---|---|---|---|---|
| 2 | DF | (Ukraine) UKR | Oleksandr Filin | 2 | 0 | 1 | 0 | 1 | 0 |
| 3 | DF | (Russia) RUS | Pavel Alikin | 18 | 1 | 16+1 | 1 | 0+1 | 0 |
| 4 | DF | (Russia) RUS | Aleksei Nikitin | 23 | 1 | 19+2 | 1 | 1+1 | 0 |
| 6 | FW | (Germany) GER | Marvin Pourié | 13 | 2 | 5+6 | 1 | 0+2 | 1 |
| 7 | DF | (Russia) RUS | Yevgeni Osipov | 15 | 0 | 8+5 | 0 | 2 | 0 |
| 8 | MF | (Russia) RUS | Semyon Fomin | 15 | 2 | 4+9 | 1 | 2 | 1 |
| 9 | FW | (Bosnia and Herzegovina) BIH | Haris Handžić | 20 | 1 | 8+10 | 1 | 2 | 0 |
| 10 | MF | (Brazil) BRA | Marcinho | 20 | 1 | 13+4 | 1 | 3 | 0 |
| 11 | FW | (Brazil) BRA | Diego Carlos | 20 | 0 | 12+6 | 0 | 2 | 0 |
| 13 | MF | (Russia) RUS | Azamat Zaseyev | 21 | 0 | 20 | 0 | 1 | 0 |
| 17 | MF | (Ukraine) UKR | Oleksandr Zinchenko | 26 | 2 | 19+5 | 2 | 2 | 0 |
| 19 | MF | (Croatia) CRO | Ivan Paurević | 30 | 3 | 28 | 3 | 1+1 | 0 |
| 20 | DF | (Russia) RUS | Denis Tumasyan | 16 | 1 | 15+1 | 1 | 0 | 0 |
| 31 | FW | (Russia) RUS | Dmitri Sysuyev | 11 | 2 | 7+4 | 2 | 0 | 0 |
| 33 | DF | (Russia) RUS | Aleksandr Sukhov | 17 | 0 | 16+1 | 0 | 0 | 0 |
| 34 | DF | (Russia) RUS | Aleksandr Katsalapov | 18 | 1 | 13+3 | 0 | 2 | 1 |
| 39 | MF | (Russia) RUS | Dmitry Stotsky | 31 | 2 | 30 | 2 | 1 | 0 |
| 42 | GK | (Russia) RUS | Sergei Narubin | 9 | 0 | 6+1 | 0 | 2 | 0 |
| 44 | MF | (Nigeria) NGR | Sylvester Igboun | 26 | 4 | 24+1 | 4 | 1 | 0 |
| 60 | MF | (Russia) RUS | Vladimir Zubarev | 12 | 1 | 11 | 1 | 0+1 | 0 |
| 70 | MF | (Russia) RUS | Nikolai Safronidi | 17 | 1 | 12+3 | 1 | 2 | 0 |
| 87 | MF | (Russia) RUS | Igor Bezdenezhnykh | 6 | 0 | 0+5 | 0 | 0+1 | 0 |
| 88 | GK | (Russia) RUS | Giorgi Shelia | 13 | 0 | 12 | 0 | 1 | 0 |
| 93 | FW | (Russia) RUS | Vyacheslav Krotov | 23 | 4 | 15+5 | 2 | 2+1 | 2 |
Players away from the club on loan:
| 1 | GK | (Russia) RUS | David Yurchenko | 12 | 0 | 12 | 0 | 0 | 0 |
| 14 | MF | (Russia) RUS | Maksim Semakin | 4 | 0 | 1+2 | 0 | 1 | 0 |
Players who left Ufa during the season:
| 5 | MF | (Ghana) GHA | Emmanuel Frimpong | 9 | 0 | 5+3 | 0 | 1 | 0 |
| 22 | MF | (Uzbekistan) UZB | Vagiz Galiulin | 11 | 0 | 1+8 | 0 | 1+1 | 0 |
| 81 | DF | (Belarus) BLR | Dzmitry Verkhawtsow | 11 | 0 | 6+3 | 0 | 2 | 0 |

=== Goal Scorers ===
| Place | Position | Nation | Number | Name | Russian Premier League | Russian Cup | Total |
|---|---|---|---|---|---|---|---|
| 1 | MF | (Nigeria) | 44 | Sylvester Igboun | 4 | 0 | 4 |
| 1 | FW | (Russia) | 93 | Vyacheslav Krotov | 2 | 2 | 4 |
| 3 | MF | (Croatia) | 19 | Ivan Paurević | 3 | 0 | 3 |
| 4 | MF | (Russia) | 39 | Dmitry Stotsky | 2 | 0 | 2 |
| 4 | MF | (Ukraine) | 17 | Oleksandr Zinchenko | 2 | 0 | 2 |
| 4 | MF | (Russia) | 31 | Dmitri Sysuyev | 2 | 0 | 2 |
| 4 | MF | (Russia) | 8 | Semyon Fomin | 1 | 1 | 2 |
| 4 | FW | (Germany) | 6 | Marvin Pourié | 1 | 1 | 2 |
| 9 | FW | (Bosnia and Herzegovina) | 9 | Haris Handžić | 1 | 0 | 1 |
| 9 | DF | (Russia) | 3 | Pavel Alikin | 1 | 0 | 1 |
| 9 | MF | (Brazil) | 10 | Marcinho | 1 | 0 | 1 |
| 9 | DF | (Russia) | 4 | Aleksei Nikitin | 1 | 0 | 1 |
| 9 | MF | (Russia) | 70 | Nikolai Safronidi | 1 | 0 | 1 |
| 9 | DF | (Russia) | 20 | Denis Tumasyan | 1 | 0 | 1 |
| 9 | MF | (Russia) | 60 | Vladimir Zubarev | 1 | 0 | 1 |
| 9 | MF | (Russia) | 13 | Azamat Zaseyev | 0 | 1 | 1 |
| 9 | | | | Own goal | 1 | 0 | 1 |
| | | | | TOTALS | 25 | 5 | 30 |

=== Disciplinary record ===
| Number | Nation | Position | Name | Russian Premier League | | Russian Cup | | Total | |
| Number | Nation | Position | Name | Yellow card | Red card | Yellow card | Red card | Yellow card | Red card |
| 1 | (Russia) | GK | David Yurchenko | 2 | 0 | 0 | 0 | 2 | 0 |
| 2 | (Ukraine) | DF | Oleksandr Filin | 0 | 0 | 1 | 0 | 1 | 0 |
| 3 | (Russia) | DF | Pavel Alikin | 2 | 0 | 0 | 0 | 2 | 0 |
| 4 | (Russia) | DF | Aleksei Nikitin | 2 | 0 | 0 | 0 | 2 | 0 |
| 5 | (Ghana) | MF | Emmanuel Frimpong | 3 | 2 | 0 | 0 | 3 | 2 |
| 6 | (Germany) | FW | Marvin Pourié | 1 | 0 | 0 | 0 | 1 | 0 |
| 7 | (Russia) | DF | Yevgeni Osipov | 1 | 0 | 0 | 0 | 1 | 0 |
| 8 | (Russia) | MF | Semyon Fomin | 3 | 0 | 1 | 0 | 3 | 0 |
| 9 | (Bosnia and Herzegovina) | FW | Haris Handžić | 4 | 0 | 0 | 0 | 4 | 0 |
| 10 | (Brazil) | MF | Marcinho | 4 | 0 | 1 | 0 | 5 | 0 |
| 11 | (Brazil) | FW | Diego Carlos | 3 | 0 | 0 | 0 | 3 | 0 |
| 13 | (Russia) | MF | Azamat Zaseyev | 4 | 0 | 0 | 0 | 4 | 0 |
| 17 | (Ukraine) | MF | Oleksandr Zinchenko | 3 | 0 | 0 | 0 | 3 | 0 |
| 19 | (Croatia) | MF | Ivan Paurević | 4 | 0 | 1 | 0 | 5 | 0 |
| 20 | (Russia) | DF | Denis Tumasyan | 1 | 0 | 0 | 0 | 1 | 0 |
| 22 | (Uzbekistan) | MF | Vagiz Galiulin | 1 | 0 | 1 | 0 | 2 | 0 |
| 31 | (Russia) | FW | Dmitri Sysuyev | 2 | 0 | 0 | 0 | 2 | 0 |
| 33 | (Russia) | DF | Aleksandr Sukhov | 1 | 0 | 0 | 0 | 1 | 0 |
| 34 | (Russia) | MF | Aleksandr Katsalapov | 3 | 0 | 0 | 0 | 3 | 0 |
| 39 | (Russia) | MF | Dmitry Stotsky | 2 | 0 | 0 | 0 | 2 | 0 |
| 42 | (Russia) | GK | Sergei Narubin | 1 | 0 | 0 | 0 | 1 | 0 |
| 44 | (Nigeria) | MF | Sylvester Igboun | 6 | 1 | 0 | 0 | 6 | 1 |
| 60 | (Russia) | MF | Vladimir Zubarev | 2 | 0 | 0 | 0 | 2 | 0 |
| 70 | (Russia) | MF | Nikolai Safronidi | 1 | 0 | 1 | 0 | 2 | 0 |
| 87 | (Russia) | MF | Igor Bezdenezhnykh | 1 | 0 | 0 | 0 | 1 | 0 |
| 93 | (Russia) | FW | Vyacheslav Krotov | 1 | 0 | 0 | 0 | 1 | 0 |
| | | | TOTALS | 58 | 3 | 6 | 0 | 64 | 3 |
