= Diego Carlos =

Diego Carlos may refer to:

- Diego Carlos (footballer, born 1988), Brazilian footballer
- Diego Carlos (footballer, born 1993), Brazilian footballer playing for Fenerbahçe
