= Artyom Potapov =

Russian footballer

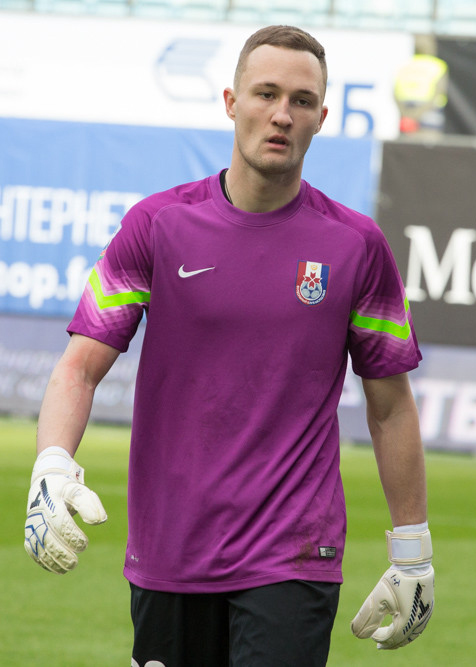

Personal information
- Full name: Artyom Vladimirovich Potapov
- Date of birth: 28 June 1994 (age 32)
- Place of birth: Orenburg, Russia
- Height: 1.90 m (6 ft 3 in)
- Position: Goalkeeper

Team information
- Current team: Khorazm

Youth career
- –2006: Gazovik Orenburg
- 2006–2010: Konoplyov football academy

Senior career*
Years	Team	Apps	(Gls)
2010–2013	Akademiya Tolyatti	29	(0)
2013	Krasnodar	0	(0)
2013	→ Krasnodar-2	6	(0)
2014–2016	Ufa	0	(0)
2016	Lučko	2	(0)
2016–2017	Mordovia Saransk	20	(0)
2017–2018	Krylia Sovetov Samara	1	(0)
2018	SKA-Khabarovsk	0	(0)
2019	Torpedo Minsk	9	(0)
2019–2020	Minsk	34	(0)
2021	Kaisar	13	(0)
2022	Alashkert	2	(0)
2022	Ararat Yerevan	18	(0)
2023–	Surkhon Termez	40	(0)
2025–	→ Khorazm (loan)	2	(0)

International career
2009–2010	Russia U16	9	(0)
2010–2011	Russia U17	11	(0)
2012	Russia U18	1	(0)
2012–2013	Russia U19	10	(0)
2014	Russia U21	7	(0)
- * Club domestic league appearances and goals as of 11 August 2025

Artyom Vladimirovich Potapov (Russian: Артём Владимирович Потапов; born 28 June 1994), known until 2022 as Artyom Leonov (Russian: Артём Леонов), is a Russian footballer who plays as a goalkeeper for Khorazm.

== Club career ==
Potapov made his debut in the Russian Second Division for FC Akademiya Tolyatti on 24 April 2011 in a game against FC Oktan Perm.

=== Alashkert ===
On 23 February 2023, Armenian Premier League club Alashkert announced the signing of Potapov

=== Ararat Yerevan ===
On 3 June 2022, Ararat Yerevan announced the signing of Potapov. On 10 December 2022, Ararat Yerevan announced that Potapov had left by mutual consent.

=== Surkhon Termez ===
On 22 November 2023, Surkhon Termez announced the extension of Potapov's contract for another three seasons.

== Personal life ==
In 2022 he changed his last name from Leonov to Potapov.

== Career statistics ==
=== Club ===
As of match played 19 November 2023

Appearances and goals by club, season and competition
Club	Season	League			National cup (Note: Includes Russian Cup, Croatian Cup, Belarusian Cup, Kazakhstan Cup, Armenian Cup, Uzbekistan Cup)		Continental		Other		Total	
Club	Season	Division	Apps	Goals	Apps	Goals	Apps	Goals	Apps	Goals	Apps	Goals
Akademiya Tolyatti	2010	Russian Second Division	0	0	0	0	—		—		0	0
Akademiya Tolyatti	2011–12	Russian Second Division	22	0	0	0	—		—		22	0
Akademiya Tolyatti	2012–13	Russian Second Division	7	0	0	0	—		—		7	0
Akademiya Tolyatti	Total		29	0	0	0	-	-	-	-	29	0
Krasnodar	2013–14	Russian Premier League	0	0	0	0	—		—		0	0
Krasnodar-2	2013–14	Russian Second Division	6	0	0	0	—		—		6	0
Ufa	2013–14	Football National League	0	0	0	0	—		—		0	0
Ufa	2014–15	Russian Premier League	0	0	0	0	—		—		0	0
Ufa	2015–16	Russian Premier League	0	0	0	0	—		—		0	0
Ufa	Total		0	0	0	0	-	-	-	-	0	0
NK Lučko	2015–16	Druga NL	2	0	0	0	—		—		2	0
Mordovia Saransk	2016–17	Football National League	20	0	2	0	—		—		22	0
Krylia Sovetov	2017–18	Football National League	1	0	1	0	—		—		2	0
SKA-Khabarovsk	2018–19	Football National League	0	0	0	0	—		—		0	0
Torpedo Minsk	2019	Belarusian Premier League	9	0	0	0	—		—		9	0
Minsk	2019	Belarusian Premier League	11	0	2	0	—		—		13	0
Minsk	2020	Belarusian Premier League	23	0	1	0	—		—		24	0
Minsk	Total		34	0	3	0	-	-	-	-	37	0
Kaisar	2021	Kazakhstan Premier League	13	0	0	0	—		—		13	0
Alashkert	2021–22	Armenian Premier League	2	0	0	0	0 (Note: Zero appearances in the UEFA Champions League, UEFA Europa League, UEFA Europa Conference League)	0	0 (Note: Appearances in the Armenian Supercup)	0	2	0
Ararat Yerevan	2022–23	Armenian Premier League	18	0	1	0	2 (Note: Appearances in the UEFA Europa Conference League)	0	—		21	0
Surkhon Termez	2023	Uzbekistan Super League	22	0	2	0	—		—		24	0
Career total			156	0	9	0	2	0	0	0	167	0
