= FC Bashinformsvyaz-Dynamo Ufa =

- Full name: Football Club Bashinformsvyaz-Dynamo Ufa
- Founded: 2009
- Dissolved: 2010
- Ground: Dynamo Stadium
- League: -
- 2010: 10th (Russian Second Division, Zone Ural-Povolzhye)
Home colours	Away colours

FC Bashinformsvyaz-Dynamo Ufa (Bashkir: «Башинформсвязь-Динамо» Өфө ФК, Russian: ФК «Башинформсвязь-Динамо» Уфа) was a Russian football club from Ufa that existed for the 2009 and 2010 seasons. During those seasons it played in the Russian Second Division (zone Ural-Povolzhye).

After the 2010 season the club was dissolved and FC Ufa was created.
