= Emmanuel Frimpong =

Ghanaian footballer

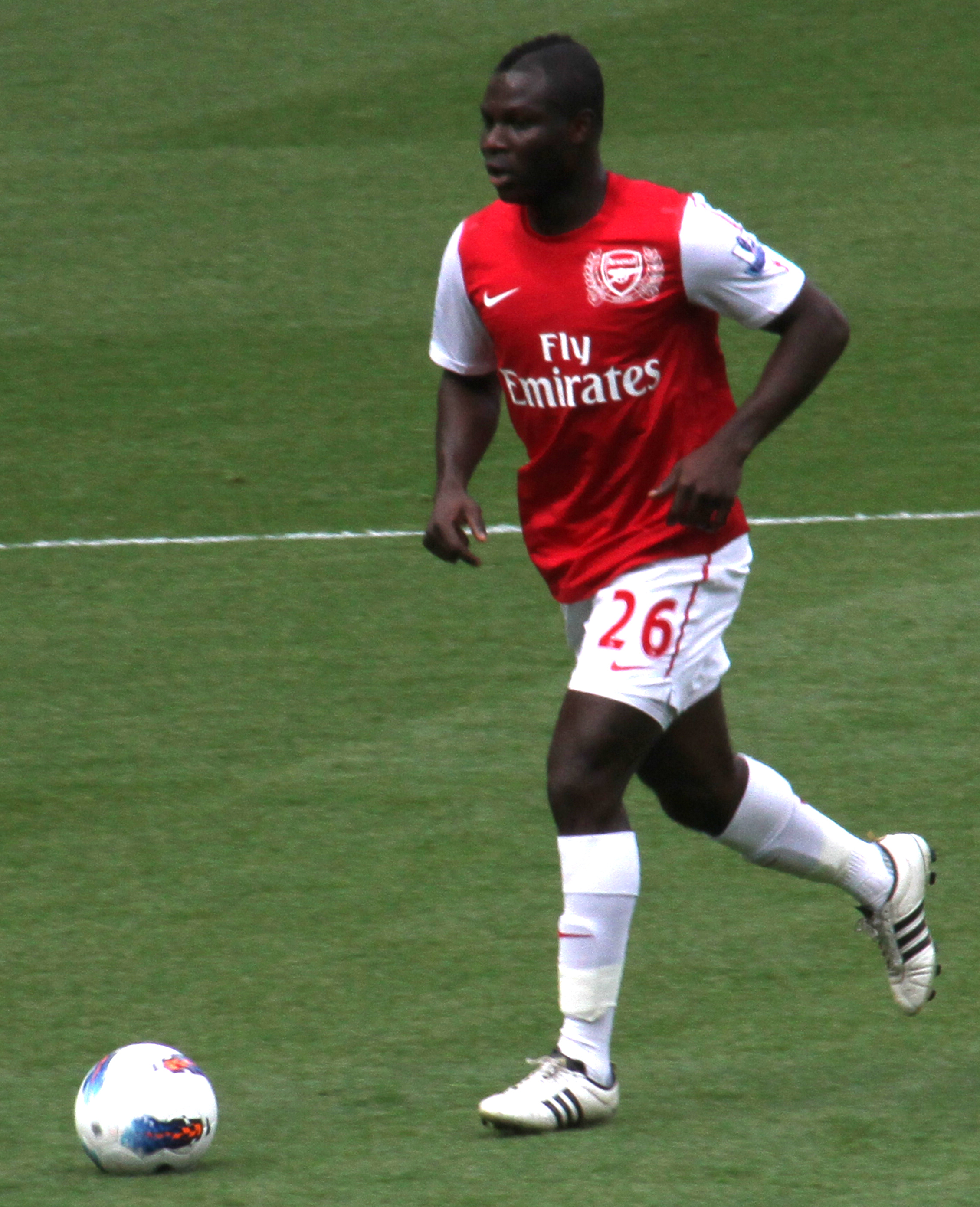
- Frimpong with Arsenal in 2012

Personal information
- Full name: Emmanuel Yaw Frimpong
- Date of birth: 10 January 1992 (age 34)
- Place of birth: Kumasi, Ghana
- Height: 1.78 m (5 ft 10 in)
- Position: Midfielder

Youth career
- 2001–2011: Arsenal

Senior career*
Years	Team	Apps	(Gls)
2011–2014	Arsenal	6	(0)
2012	→ Wolverhampton Wanderers (loan)	5	(0)
2012	→ Charlton Athletic (loan)	6	(0)
2013	→ Fulham (loan)	6	(0)
2014	Barnsley	9	(0)
2014–2016	Ufa	25	(0)
2016–2017	Arsenal Tula	3	(0)
2017	AFC Eskilstuna	10	(0)
2017	Ermis Aradippou	12	(0)
Total		82	(0)

International career
2007–2008	England U16	6	(1)
2008–2009	England U17	6	(0)
2013	Ghana	1	(0)
- * Club domestic league appearances and goals

Emmanuel Yaw Frimpong (Akan: /frɪmˈpɒŋ/ frim-PONG) (born 10 January 1992) is a Ghanaian former professional footballer who played as a midfielder.

He began his career at Arsenal, where he won a FA Youth Cup and two Premier Academy League titles. He also played for English sides: Wolverhampton Wanderers, Charlton Athletic and Fulham. In January 2014, Frimpong moved to Barnsley, then to Russian team Ufa in September of that year. He then featured for Arsenal Tula and subsequently that of AFC Eskilstuna of the Swedish Allsvenskan.

Although Frimpong represented England at youth level, in March 2013 he made his full international debut for Ghana, his country of birth. He holds both a Ghanaian and a British passport.

== Early life ==
Frimpong was born in Kumasi, Ghana, but moved to Tottenham at a young age, where he was originally discovered by Arsenal and enrolled at the Hale End Academy at the age of nine alongside fellow graduate Jack Wilshere. He attended Gladesmore Community School in Tottenham until he was 14, when he left to focus on playing football full-time at Arsenal's youth academy.

== Club career ==
=== Arsenal ===
Frimpong began his Arsenal career in their youth academy aged nine. He scored against Coventry City, in 2007, and Milton Keynes Dons, among others. Arsenal added him to their reserve team in 2008, whereupon he made his debut for the reserves on 5 October 2009 against Chelsea. Frimpong as well as fellow academy member Jay Emmanuel-Thomas were on the bench for the match against Sheffield United.

On 22 May 2009, Frimpong was injured on the quarter-hour mark of the FA Youth Cup Final against Liverpool and was substituted. He went on to win a league and cup double as Arsenal went on to win the Youth Cup together with that of the Premier Academy League of 2009. Frimpong again won the league with Arsenal in the following year, being 2010.

He featured heavily in Arsenal's pre-season in Austria and received praise from senior manager Arsène Wenger for his performances at the 2010 Emirates Cup: "I believe Frimpong has done really well, as well. He is a bit less of a dribbler but he is a fighter and he is a winner".

On 19 August 2010, Frimpong injured an anterior cruciate ligament (ACL) in training and was out injured for nine months. After returning from the injury, on 17 June 2011, Frimpong claimed he was in talks with Championship club Cardiff City and League One side Charlton Athletic over a possible loan deal, which could provide him with regular football.

==== 2011–12 season ====
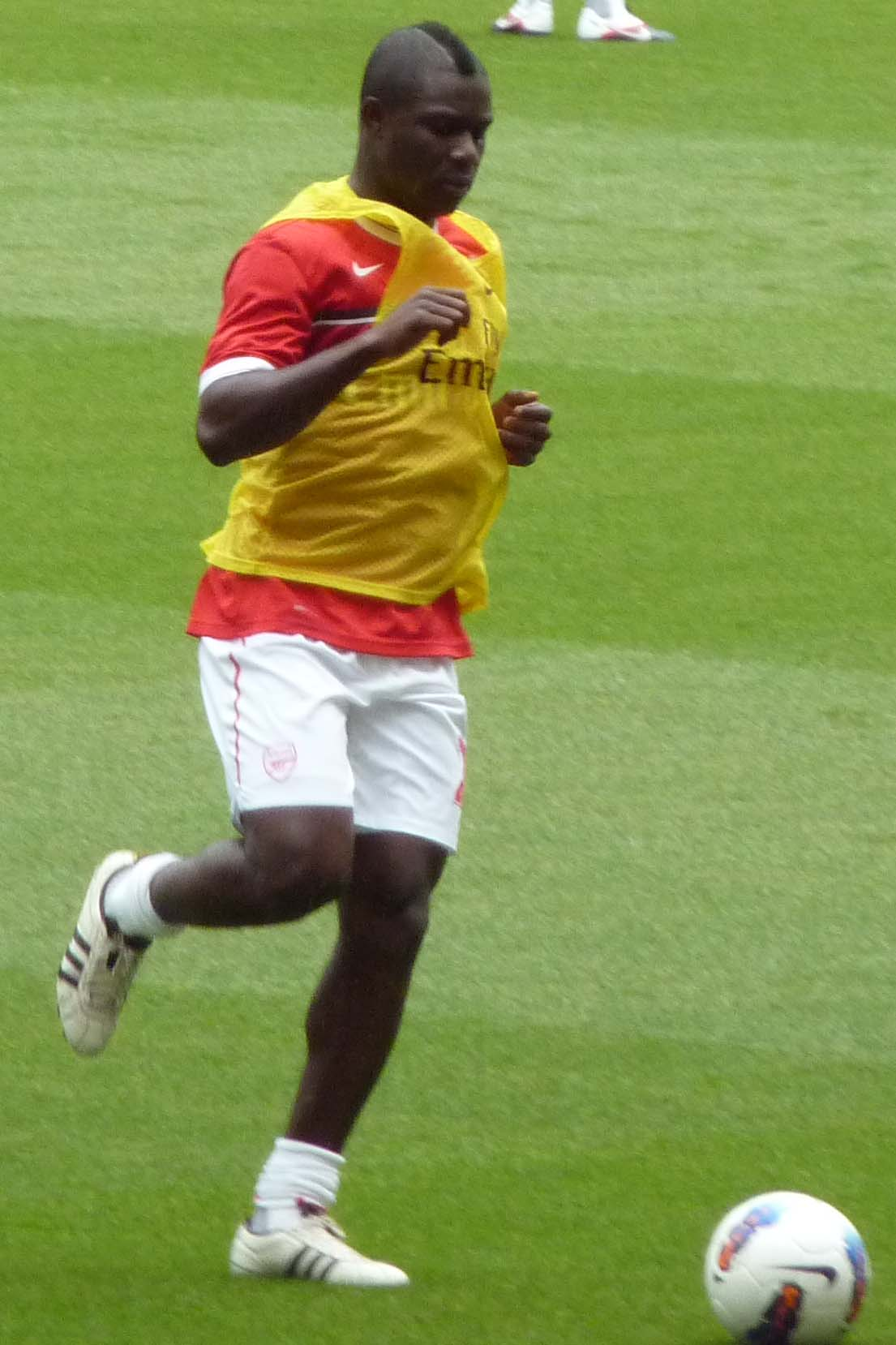
Frimpong with Arsenal in September 2011.

Frimpong made his Premier League debut for Arsenal in their match against Newcastle United on 13 August 2011, coming on as a second-half substitute for Tomáš Rosický. On 16 August 2011, Frimpong came on as a second-half substitute for Rosický again, this time in the UEFA Champions League match against Udinese. He made his first start in the Premier League on 20 August 2011 against Liverpool but ended up being sent off in the 69th minute of the match after receiving a second yellow card for a challenge on Lucas. Following Arsenal's loss to Manchester City in the League Cup quarter-finals, Frimpong and then-teammate Samir Nasri clashed in the tunnel. They had tussled throughout the tie, and at the end of the match, they appeared to start arguing as the teams walked off the pitch, before continuing their disagreement in the tunnel. Following the incident, Nasri and Frimpong were not disciplined over the incident.

===== Loan spell at Wolves =====
On 1 January 2012, it was confirmed that Frimpong had joined fellow Premier League side Wolverhampton Wanderers on loan until the end of the season. The following day, he made his debut, starting in a 2–1 loss to Chelsea. In only his fifth appearance for the club, however, he ruptured a cruciate ligament in his right knee during a 2–1 win at Queens Park Rangers, effectively ending his season. He was then returned from his loan early to Arsenal, as his injury would rule him out for the rest of his time at Wolves.

==== 2012–13 season ====
On 19 November 2012, Frimpong joined Championship side Charlton Athletic on a six-week loan deal until 1 January 2013 and a few weeks later, on 25 January 2013, joined Fulham on a season-long loan deal.

=== Barnsley ===
Frimpong joined Barnsley for an undisclosed fee on 31 January 2014. He went straight into the squad for the Yorkshire derby against Sheffield Wednesday but was sent off after 31 minutes. Following Barnsley's relegation from the Championship, Frimpong was released after only four months at the club.

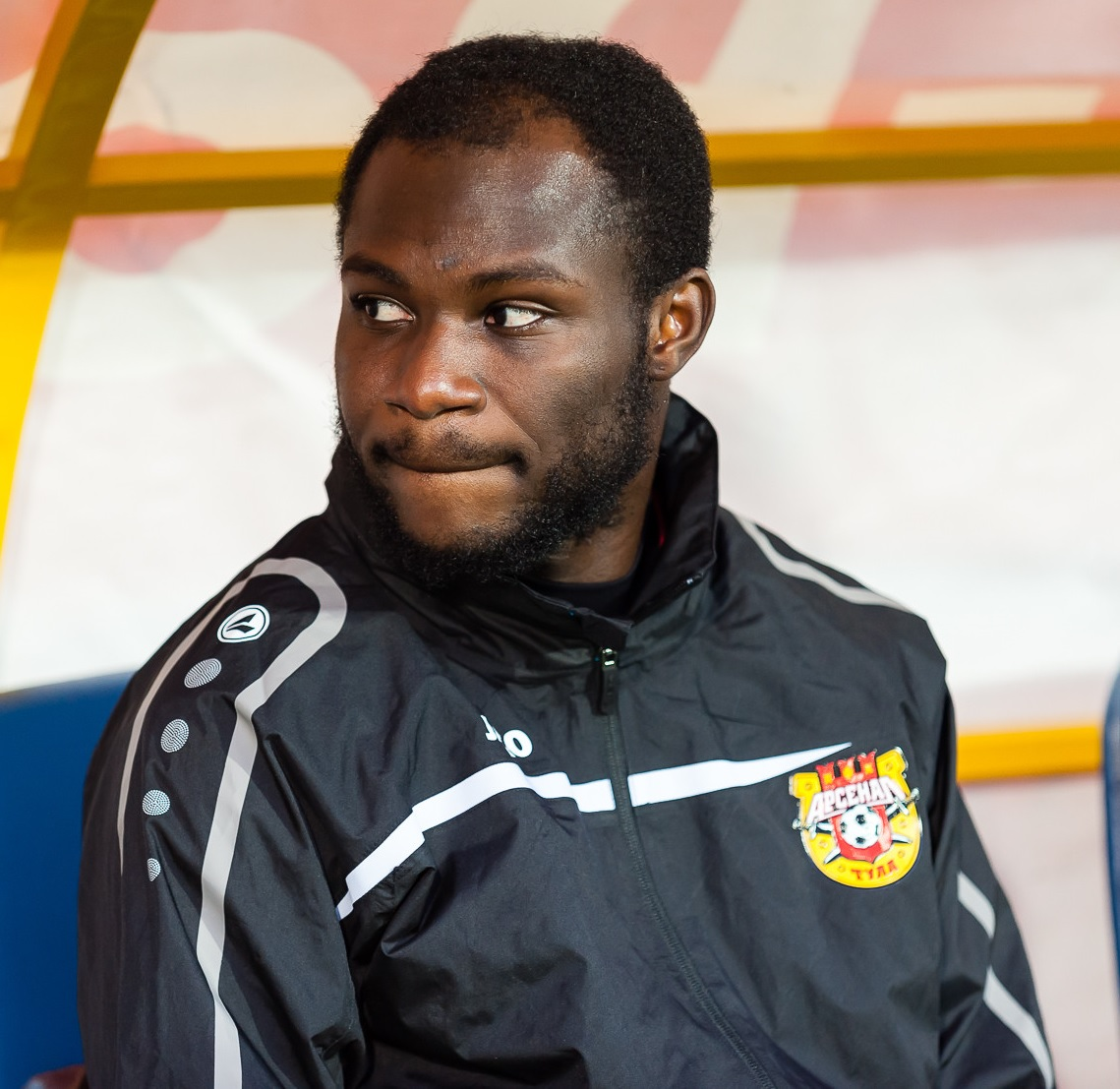
Frimpong with Arsenal Tula in 2016

=== Ufa ===
On 1 September 2014, Frimpong signed a three-year contract with Russian Premier League side FC Ufa. In the first game of the 2015–16 Russian Premier League, a match against Spartak Moscow, Frimpong was sent off in the 31st minute for making an obscene gesture at a Spartak supporter. Afterwards, Frimpong took to social media to apologize for his action but at the same time blamed racist abuse from the fans for what provoked him to make that gesture. Frimpong later received a two-match ban for the incident, a punishment he called "a joke." He was released from his Ufa contract on 4 April 2016 by mutual consent.

=== Arsenal Tula ===
On 8 August 2016, Frimpong signed two-year contract with Arsenal Tula.

=== AFC Eskilstuna ===
On 21 February 2017, Frimpong signed a two-year contract with Swedish Allsvenskan side AFC Eskilstuna.

=== Ermis Aradippou ===
On 17 August 2017, Frimpong signed a two-year contract in Cyprus with Ermis Aradippou.

In March 2019 he retired from football due to injury.

== International career ==
Frimpong played six matches with England's under-16 team in 2007. In March 2008, Frimpong scored a 71st-minute goal for England against Germany's under-16 team in the Montaigu Tournament to give England a 1–0 win.

In 2009, Frimpong said, "No matter what, I will always play for Ghana because at the end of the day, from what I believe, I am a Ghanaian." In August 2010, Frimpong was called up for the England under-19 squad to face Slovakia the following month, though he was later forced to withdraw from the squad after suffering his ACL injury.

In February 2011, Frimpong said, "I have always told my family that if Ghana calls me, I will personally ride my own bicycle from England to Ghana [to play for the Black Stars]." In August, Frimpong had planned to spectate at a friendly match between Ghana and Nigeria at Vicarage Road in Watford, but the game was postponed due to the 2011 England riots. Later that month, Frimpong received his first call-up for the England under-21 team.

On 6 September 2011, it was announced by the Ghana Football Association (GFA) that Frimpong has pledged his future to Ghana. FIFA cleared him to play for Ghana in November 2012. He made his Ghana international debut on 24 March 2013 during a 2014 World Cup qualifying match against Sudan.

== Style of play ==
Frimpong was compared with Alex Song and other African midfielders who have much pace and stamina. He has also been called a younger version of Michael Essien because of his hard work in the defensive midfielder role.

== Personal life ==
Frimpong is the cousin of Norwegian-Ghanaian professional footballer Yaw Amankwah, who captained Norwegian club Stabæk. He is also a cousin to Lethal Bizzle. In 2012, Frimpong contributed a rap verse to the remix of Bizzle's track "Leave It Yeah."

He appeared in court in May 2024 following a variety of tenant harassment allegations, including peering through his tenant's blinds.

== Career statistics ==
As of the end of 2017–18 season

Club	Season	League			Cup^{[A]}		League Cup		Other^{[B]}		Total	
Club	Season	Division	Apps	Goals	Apps	Goals	Apps	Goals	Apps	Goals	Apps	Goals
Arsenal	2011–12	Premier League	6	0	0	0	3	0	5	0	14	0
Arsenal	2012–13	Premier League	0	0	0	0	2	0	0	0	2	0
Arsenal	Arsenal total		6	0	0	0	5	0	5	0	16	0
Wolverhampton Wanders (loan)	2011–12	Premier League	5	0	–		–		–		5	0
Charlton Athletic (loan)	2012–13	Championship	6	0	–		–		–		6	0
Fulham (loan)	2012–13	Premier League	6	0	–		–		–		6	0
Barnsley	2013–14	Championship	9	0	–		–		–		9	0
Ufa	2014–15	Russian Premier League	17	0	2	0	–		–		19	0
Ufa	2015–16	Russian Premier League	8	0	1	0	–		–		9	0
Ufa	UFA total		25	0	3	0	0	0	0	0	28	0
Arsenal Tula	2016–17	Russian Premier League	3	0	1	0	–		–		4	0
AFC Eskilstuna	2017	Allsvenskan	10	0	0	0	–		–		10	0
Ermis Aradippou	2017–18	Cypriot First Division	12	0	0	0	–		–		12	0
Career totals			82	0	4	0	5	0	5	0	96	0

A. The "Cup" column constitutes appearances and goals (including substitutes) in the FA Cup and Russian Cup.
B. The "Other" column constitutes appearances and goals (including substitutes) in the UEFA Champions League.

== Honours ==
=== Club ===
Arsenal Youth

- FA Premier Academy League: 2008–09, 2009–10
- FA Youth Cup: 2008–09

=== International ===
England U-16

- Montaigu Tournament: 2008
