= Marcinho (footballer, born 1986) =

Brazilian association football player (born 1986)

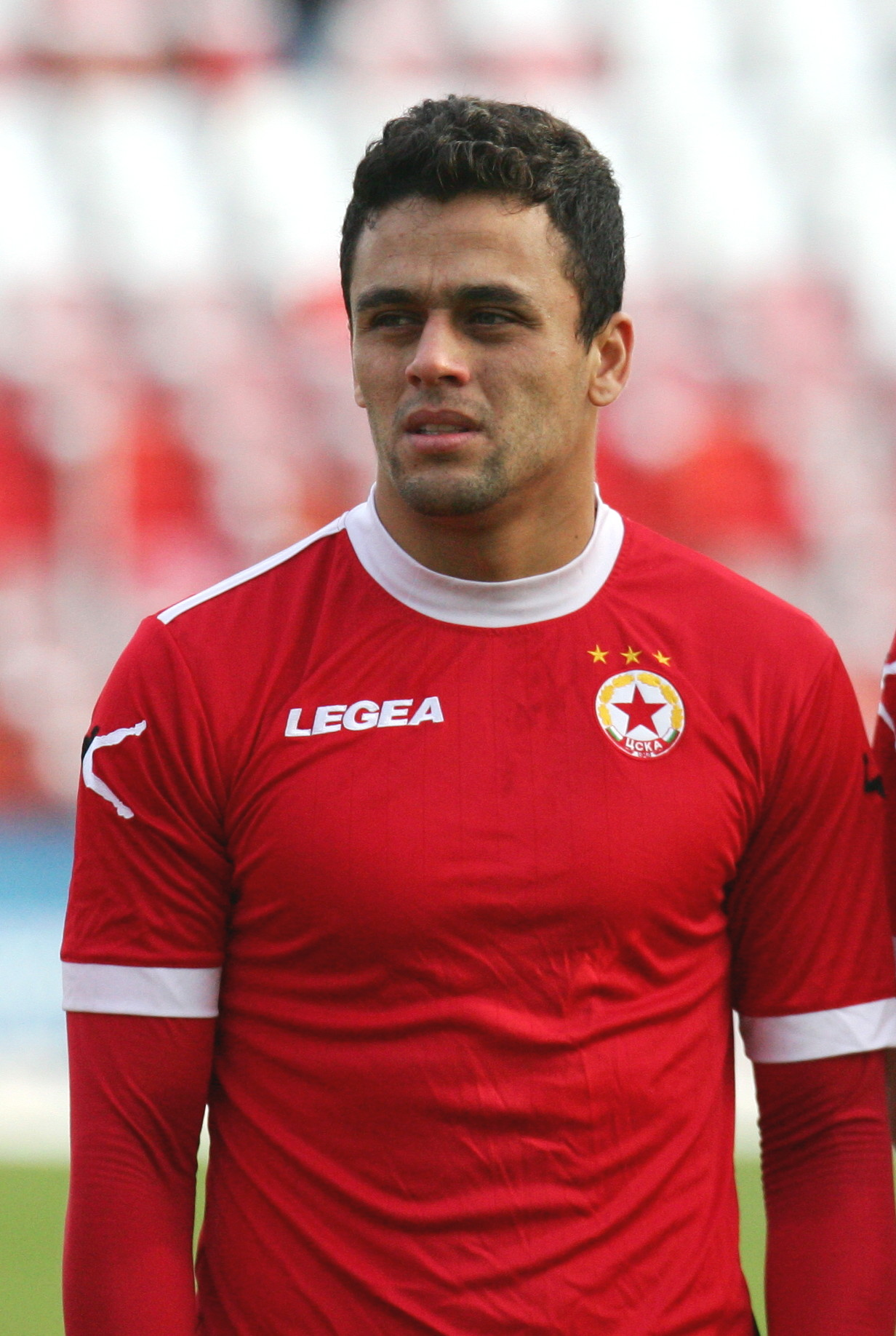

Personal information
- Full name: Marcio de Souza Gregório Júnior
- Date of birth: 14 May 1986 (age 40)
- Place of birth: Volta Redonda, Rio de Janeiro, Brazil
- Height: 1.82 m (6 ft 0 in)
- Position: Attacking midfielder

Youth career
- 1992–2004: Volta Redonda

Senior career*
| Years | Team | Apps | (Gls) |
| 2004–2008 | Volta Redonda | | |
| 2008 | Brasiliense | 5 | (9) |
| 2009 | Noroeste | 0 | (0) |
| 2009 | Corinthians | 14 | (2) |
| 2010 | Brasiliense | 0 | (0) |
| 2010 | Gyeongnam | 8 | (2) |
| 2011 | Botafogo-SP | 0 | (2) |
| 2011 | Bragantino | 28 | (1) |
| 2012 | Itumbiara | 2 | (0) |
| 2012 | Guaratinguetá | 24 | (2) |
| 2013–2014 | CSKA Sofia | 29 | (7) |
| 2014–2016 | Ufa | 56 | (8) |
| 2017 | Gaziantepspor | 12 | (1) |
| 2017–2018 | NorthEast United FC | 15 | (4) |
| 2018–2019 | Criciúma | 8 | (0) |
- * Club domestic league appearances and goals

Marcio de Souza Gregório Júnior (born 14 May 1986), commonly known as Marcinho, is a Brazilian former professional footballer who played as an attacking midfielder.

== Career ==
Marcinho played for a few Brazilian clubs and South Korean side Gyeongnam FC.

On 9 January 2013, Marcinho joined CSKA Sofia in Bulgaria. He signed a one-and-a-half-year contract and took the number 9 shirt. He made his A Group debut on 31 March, in a 3–0 home win over Minyor Pernik and scored his first goal on 6 April, in a 4–3 away victory over Botev Vratsa. On 27 April 2013, Marcinho netted an equalizing goal with a volley in The Eternal Derby against Levski Sofia, which was eventually lost by a score of 1–2.

On 23 January 2017, he signed a 1.5-year contract with Gaziantepspor. He left the club again in May 2017.

=== NorthEast United ===
In August 2017, Marcinho signed with Indian Super League franchise NorthEast United, becoming the club's first foreign signing in 2017.

== Career statistics ==
As of match played 2 December 2017

Appearances and goals by club, season and competition
| Club | Season | League | | | National cup | | League cup | | Continental | | State League | | Total | |
| Club | Season | Division | Apps | Goals | Apps | Goals | Apps | Goals | Apps | Goals | Apps | Goals | Apps | Goals |
|---|---|---|---|---|---|---|---|---|---|---|---|---|---|---|
| Brasiliense | 2008 | Série B | 5 | 9 | 0 | 0 | – | | – | | 0 | 0 | 5 | 9 |
| Noroeste | 2009 | Paulista | 0 | 0 | 0 | 0 | – | | – | | 11 | 2 | 11 | 2 |
| Corinthians | 2009 | Série A | 14 | 2 | 0 | 0 | – | | – | | 0 | 0 | 14 | 2 |
| Brasiliense | 2011 | Brasiliense | 0 | 0 | 2 | 1 | – | | – | | 0 | 0 | 2 | 1 |
| Gyeongnam | 2011 | K League Classic | 3 | 0 | 1 | 0 | – | | – | | – | | 4 | 0 |
| Botafogo-SP | 2011 | Paulista | 0 | 0 | 0 | 0 | – | | – | | 7 | 0 | 7 | 0 |
| Bragantino | 2011 | Série B | 28 | 1 | 0 | 0 | – | | – | | 0 | 0 | 28 | 1 |
| Itumbiara | 2012 | Goiano | 0 | 0 | 0 | 0 | – | | – | | 16 | 3 | 16 | 3 |
| Guaratinguetá | 2012 | Série B | 24 | 2 | 0 | 0 | – | | – | | 0 | 0 | 24 | 2 |
| CSKA Sofia | 2012–13 | A Group | 7 | 3 | 1 | 0 | – | | – | | – | | 8 | 3 |
| CSKA Sofia | 2013–14 | A Group | 22 | 4 | 4 | 2 | – | | – | | – | | 26 | 6 |
| CSKA Sofia | Total | | 29 | 7 | 5 | 2 | 0 | 0 | 0 | 0 | 0 | 0 | 34 | 9 |
| Ufa | 2014–15 | Russian Premier League | 28 | 6 | 0 | 0 | – | | – | | – | | 28 | 6 |
| Ufa | 2015–16 | Russian Premier League | 17 | 1 | 3 | 0 | – | | – | | – | | 20 | 1 |
| Ufa | 2016–17 | Russian Premier League | 11 | 0 | 2 | 1 | – | | – | | – | | 13 | 1 |
| Ufa | Total | | 56 | 7 | 5 | 1 | 0 | 0 | 0 | 0 | 0 | 0 | 61 | 8 |
| Gaziantepspor | 2016–17 | Süper Lig | 11 | 1 | 0 | 0 | – | | – | | – | | 11 | 1 |
| NorthEast United FC | 2017–18 | Indian Super League | 15 | 4 | 0 | 0 | – | | – | | – | | 15 | 4 |
| Career total | | | 209 | 28 | 13 | 4 | 0 | 0 | 0 | 0 | 34 | 5 | 256 | 37 |
