= William Oliveira (footballer, born 1982) =

Brazilian football coach and former player

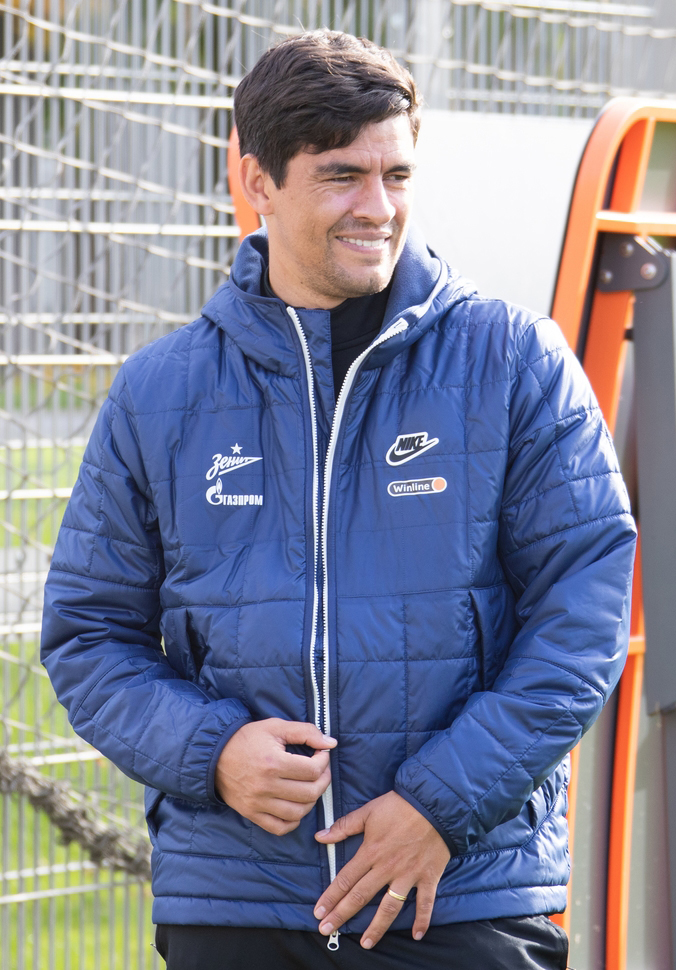
- Oliveira as coach with Zenit St. Petersburg in 2020

Personal information
- Full name: William Artur de Oliveira
- Date of birth: 20 October 1982 (age 44)
- Place of birth: São Bernardo do Campo, Brazil
- Height: 1.82 m (6 ft 0 in)
- Positions: Midfielder; defender

Team information
- Current team: Zenit St.Petersburg (coach)

Youth career
- Palmeiras

Senior career*
Years	Team	Apps	(Gls)
2002	Caldense		
2003	Serra Negra		
2004	Cascavel		
2005	Nacional de Rolândia		
2005	Puebla		
2006	Águia Negra		
2006–2007	Srem	38	(6)
2008	OFK Beograd	28	(3)
2009–2010	Amkar Perm	9	(0)
2010	→ Shinnik Yaroslavl (loan)	19	(1)
2010–2012	Dynamo Bryansk	55	(1)
2012–2014	Ufa	54	(0)

Managerial career
- 2015–2017: Ufa (interpreter)
- 2017–2019: Ufa (assistant)
- 2019–: Zenit St.Petersburg (coach)
- * Club domestic league appearances and goals

William Artur de Oliveira (Russian: Виллиам Артур Де Оливейра; born 20 October 1982) is a Brazilian football coach and a former player. He is an assistant coach with Zenit St.Petersburg.

== Playing career ==
Born in São Bernardo do Campo, William Oliveira spent his early career playing with Associação Atlética Caldense with whom he will win the 2002 Campeonato Mineiro. Afterwards he played with Serra Negra in São Paulo, Cascavel Clube Recreativo and Nacional de Rolandia. Then he moved to Mexico to join Puebla in 2005. That year the club finished top of the Mexican Primera División A becoming the 2005 Apertura champions.

In 2006, he was back to Brazil playing with Esporte Clube Águia Negra but by the end of the year he will move again abroad, this time to play with Serbian First League side Srem. His good exhibitions called the attention of Serbian SuperLiga club OFK Beograd who brought him in January 2008.

He scored seven league goals in 22 matches in the Serbian top flight with OFK and by the winter break of the 2008–09 season he was moving to Russia to join Premier League side Amkar Perm. He also spent few months with Shinnik Yaroslavl, before joining Dynamo Bryansk in the summer of 2010. He stayed two years in Bryansk, collecting 56 league appearances and scoring one goal. In July 2012, he signed a two-year contract with Ufa.

== Coaching career ==
On 15 January 2019, FC Ufa announced that William Oliveira had left his coaching role with Ufa to take up a similar role with Zenit St.Petersburg.

== Personal life ==
On 30 December 2021, he acquired citizenship of Russia.

== Career statistics ==
As of match played 20 September 2014

Appearances and goals by club, season and competition
Club	Season	League			National cup		Other		Total	
Club	Season	Division	Apps	Goals	Apps	Goals	Apps	Goals	Apps	Goals
Amkar Perm	2009	Russian Premier League	9	0	0	0	–		9	0
Shinnik Yaroslavl (loan)	2010	Russian National League	19	1	1	0	–		20	1
Dynamo Bryansk	2010	Russian National League	11	0	0	0	–		11	0
Dynamo Bryansk	2011–12	Russian National League	44	1	3	0	0	0	47	1
Dynamo Bryansk	Total		55	1	3	0	0	0	58	1
Ufa	2012–13	Russian National League	27	0	0	0	–		27	0
Ufa	2013–14	Russian National League	26	0	0	0	2	1	28	1
Ufa	2014–15	Russian Premier League	1	0	0	0	–		1	0
Ufa	Total		54	0	0	0	2	1	56	1
Career total			137	2	4	0	2	1	143	3
