= Diego Carlos (footballer, born 1988) =

Brazilian footballer

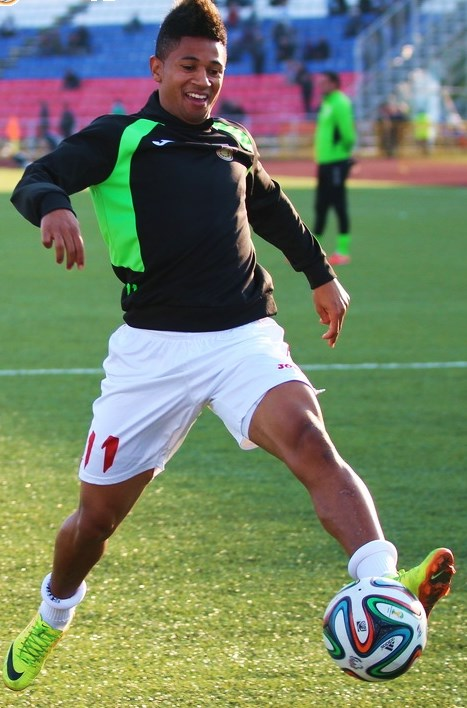

Personal information
- Full name: Diego Carlos de Oliveira
- Date of birth: 15 May 1988 (age 38)
- Place of birth: Campos Altos, Brazil
- Height: 1.74 m (5 ft 8 1/2 in)
- Position: Winger

Youth career
- Flamengo

Senior career*
Years	Team	Apps	(Gls)
2009–2010	Duque de Caxias	1	(0)
2010–2011	Corinthians Alagoano		
2011	Nizhny Novgorod	31	(10)
2012	Luch-Energiya Vladivostok	7	(0)
2012–2017	Ufa	89	(8)
2017	São Bento	5	(0)
2017–2019	Pune City	28	(4)
2019–2020	Mumbai City	6	(1)
- * Club domestic league appearances and goals

Diego Carlos de Oliveira, known as Diego Carlos (born 15 May 1988) is a Brazilian former footballer who played as a winger.

== Career ==
Carlos made his debut in the Russian First Division for FC Nizhny Novgorod on 4 April 2011 in a game against FC Volgar-Gazprom Astrakhan where he scored 2 goals. On 24 January 2017, he left FC Ufa after his contract was terminated.

On 16 March 2017, Carlos returned to Brazil, signing for São Bento which competed in Serie C, the third tier of Brazilian football. On 8 August, Carlos signed for Indian Super League franchise Pune City. He continued playing for FC Pune City in the 2018–19 season.

== Career statistics ==
As of match played 30 November 2016

Club	Season	League			National Cup		Other		Total	
Club	Season	Division	Apps	Goals	Apps	Goals	Apps	Goals	Apps	Goals
Nizhny Novgorod	2011–12	Russian National League	31	10	2	0	–		33	10
Luch-Energiya Vladivostok	2011–12	Russian National League	7	0	0	0	–		7	0
Ufa	2012–13	Russian National League	25	3	1	0	–		26	3
Ufa	2013–14	Russian National League	22	3	1	0	0	0	23	3
Ufa	2014–15	Russian Premier League	20	2	1	0	–		21	2
Ufa	2015–16	Russian Premier League	18	0	2	0	–		21	2
Ufa	2016–17	Russian Premier League	4	0	1	0	–		21	2
Ufa	Total		89	8	6	0	0	0	95	8
Career total			127	18	8	0	0	0	135	18
