= Bulat Khayernasov =

Russian footballer

Personal information
- Full name: Bulat Damirovich Khayernasov
- Date of birth: 30 September 1994 (age 32)
- Place of birth: Ufa, Russia
- Height: 1.73 m (5 ft 8 in)
- Position: Defender

Senior career*
Years	Team	Apps	(Gls)
2012	FC Gornyak Uchaly	7	(0)
2013–2014	FC Ufa	1	(0)
2015	FC Tobol Tobolsk		
2015–2016	FC Ararat Ufa		
2016	FC Vityaz Podolsk	9	(0)
2020–2022	FC Spartak Tuymazy	13	(0)
- * Club domestic league appearances and goals

Bulat Damirovich Khayernasov (Russian: Булат Дамирович Хаернасов; born 30 September 1994) is a Russian former professional football defender.

== Club career ==
He made his debut in the Russian Second Division for FC Gornyak Uchaly on 21 July 2012 in a game against FC Syzran-2003.

He made his Russian Football National League debut for FC Ufa on 18 August 2013 in a game against FC Mordovia Saransk.
