= Ivan Paurević =

Croatian footballer (born 1991)

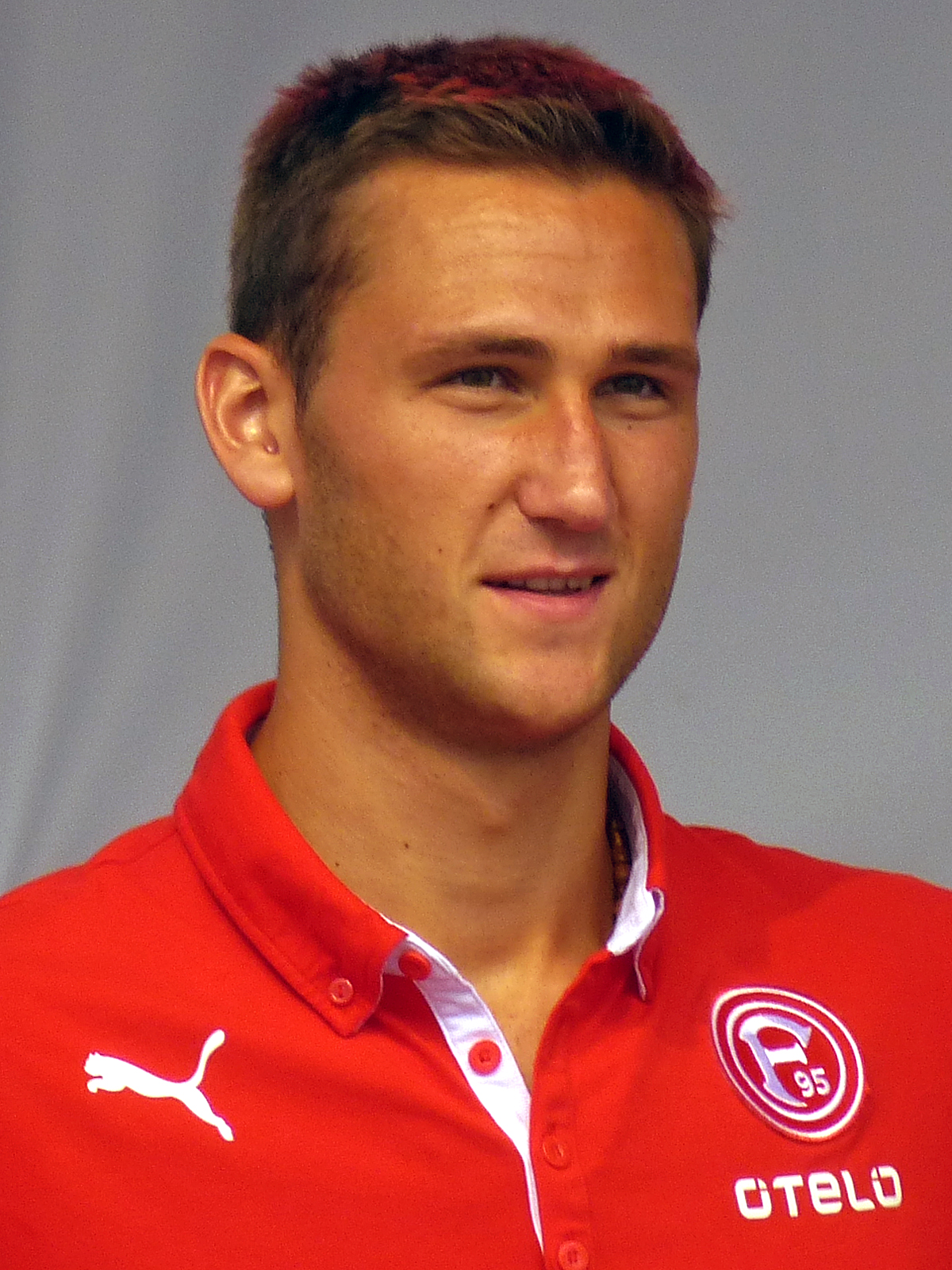
- Paurević in 2013

Personal information
- Full name: Ivan Paurević
- Date of birth: 1 July 1991 (age 35)
- Place of birth: Essen, Germany
- Height: 1.94 m (6 ft 4 in)
- Position: Defensive midfielder

Youth career
- –2004: Rot-Weiss Essen
- 2004–2010: Borussia Dortmund

Senior career*
Years	Team	Apps	(Gls)
2010–2012	Borussia Dortmund II	45	(2)
2012–2014	Fortuna Düsseldorf	22	(0)
2012–2013	Fortuna Düsseldorf II	11	(2)
2014–2016	Ufa	57	(5)
2016–2017	Huddersfield Town	1	(0)
2017–2019	Ufa	63	(6)
2019–2021	SV Sandhausen	39	(1)
2021	Riga FC	11	(0)

International career
2009	Croatia U19	1	(0)
2011–2013	Croatia U21	5	(0)
- * Club domestic league appearances and goals as of 6 November 2021

Ivan Paurević (Croatian pronunciation: [ǐʋan paǔːreʋitɕ]; born 1 July 1991) is a professional footballer who most recently played as a defensive midfielder for Latvian side Riga FC. He was born in Germany and has represented Croatia at under-age level.

== Club career ==
Paurević started his professional career in his native Germany with Borussia Dortmund reserves and Fortuna Düsseldorf.

In July 2014, at the age of 23, he moved abroad, signing with Russian Premier League club Ufa. An ever-present figure in Ufa starting XI, Paurević helped them avoid relegation in his first season as the team had finished just above the relegation play-off zone.

On 7 June 2016, he rejoined his former Dortmund manager David Wagner at English Championship club Huddersfield Town, signing a three-year deal. He made his debut for the Terriers as a substitute in their 2–1 win over Brentford on 6 August 2016. Having made just two substitute appearances since joining the club, Paurevic was released by mutual consent on 10 January 2017, and joined former club Ufa's training camp in Cyprus, ahead of a potential return to the Russian club.

On 25 January 2017, he signed a new three-and-a-half-year contract with FC Ufa.

On 2 July 2019, he signed a two-year contract with German club SV Sandhausen.

== International career ==
Paurević was born in Germany and chose to represent Croatia internationally. He played for their U-19 and U-21 teams, earning 5 caps for the latter.

== Style of play ==
Paurević is a hard-working defensive midfielder who possesses a powerful long shot, and he can also play as a center-back. Paurević also played as a striker or attacking midfielder for FC Ufa. In 110 games he scored 11 goals. Two of these were in the Europa League

== Career statistics ==
=== Club ===
As of 13 May 2018.

Appearances and goals by club, season and competition
Club	Season	League			Cup (Note: Includes the DFB-Pokal, Russian Cup and FA Cup.)		League Cup (Note: Includes the EFL Cup.)		Continental		Other		Total	
Club	Season	Division	Apps	Goals	Apps	Goals	Apps	Goals	Apps	Goals	Apps	Goals	Apps	Goals
Borussia Dortmund II	2009–10	3. Liga	1	0	0	0	0	0	—		0	0	1	0
Borussia Dortmund II	2010–11	Regionalliga West	11	0	0	0	0	0	—		0	0	11	0
Borussia Dortmund II	2011–12	Regionalliga West	32	2	0	0	0	0	—		0	0	32	2
Borussia Dortmund II	Total		44	2	0	0	0	0	—		0	0	44	2
Fortuna Düsseldorf	2012–13	Bundesliga	4	0	0	0	0	0	—		0	0	4	0
Fortuna Düsseldorf	2013–14	2. Bundesliga	18	0	0	0	0	0	—		0	0	18	0
Fortuna Düsseldorf	Total		22	0	0	0	0	0	—		0	0	22	0
Fortuna Düsseldorf II	2012–13	Regionalliga West	10	2	0	0	0	0	—		0	0	10	2
Fortuna Düsseldorf II	2013–14	Regionalliga West	1	0	0	0	0	0	—		0	0	1	0
Fortuna Düsseldorf II	Total		11	2	0	0	0	0	—		0	0	11	2
Ufa	2014–15	Russian Premier League	29	2	2	0	0	0	—		0	0	31	2
Ufa	2015–16	Russian Premier League	28	3	2	0	0	0	—		0	0	30	3
Huddersfield Town	2016–17	Championship	1	0	0	0	1	0	—		0	0	2	0
Ufa	2016–17	Russian Premier League	13	1	2	0	0	0	—		0	0	15	1
Ufa	2017–18	Russian Premier League	28	5	0	0	0	0	—		0	0	28	5
Ufa	Total (2 spells)		98	11	6	0	0	0	—		0	0	104	11
Career total			176	15	6	0	1	0	—		0	0	183	15

== Honours ==
=== Club ===
Borussia Dortmund II

- Regionalliga West: 2011–12
