= Vyacheslav Krotov =

Russian footballer

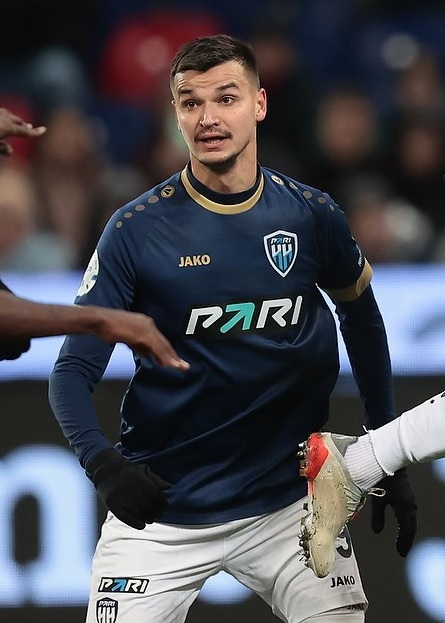
- Krotov with Pari NN in 2022

Personal information
- Full name: Vyacheslav Aleksandrovich Krotov
- Date of birth: 14 February 1993 (age 33)
- Place of birth: Astrakhan, Russia
- Height: 1.83 m (6 ft 0 in)
- Position: Forward

Team information
- Current team: Volgar Astrakhan
- Number: 57

Youth career
- –2006: Volgar Astrakhan
- 2007–2008: Lokomotiv Moscow
- 2009–2010: Dynamo Moscow

Senior career*
Years	Team	Apps	(Gls)
2011–2012	Volgar-Gazprom Astrakhan	24	(1)
2012–2015	Spartak Moscow	11	(3)
2013–2015	Spartak-2 Moscow	47	(13)
2015–2022	Ufa	147	(11)
2022–2024	Pari Nizhny Novgorod	23	(2)
2023	→ Alania Vladikavkaz (loan)	11	(2)
2024	Volgar Astrakhan	12	(4)
2024–2025	Chernomorets Novorossiysk	22	(1)
2025–2026	Yenisey Krasnoyarsk	6	(0)
2026–	Volgar Astrakhan	28	(3)
- * Club domestic league appearances and goals as of 15 November 2026

Vyacheslav Aleksandrovich Krotov (Russian: Вячеслав Александрович Кротов; born 14 February 1993) is a Russian professional football player who plays as a striker for Volgar Astrakhan.

== Club career ==
He made his debut in the Russian Premier League for Spartak Moscow in a game against Krylia Sovetov Samara on 10 May 2013.

On 17 June 2022, Krotov signed a two-year contract with Pari Nizhny Novgorod. On 13 September 2023, Krotov was loaned to Alania Vladikavkaz until the winter break of the season. Krotov left Pari NN by mutual consent on 1 February 2024.

== Career statistics ==
As of 27 November 2022

Club	Season	League			Cup		Continental		Other		Total	
Club	Season	Division	Apps	Goals	Apps	Goals	Apps	Goals	Apps	Goals	Apps	Goals
Volgar-Gazprom	2011–12	FNL	24	1	3	0	–		–		27	1
Spartak Moscow	2012–13	RPL	1	0	0	0	0	0	–		1	0
Spartak Moscow	2013–14	RPL	0	0	0	0	1 (Note: Appearances in the UEFA Europa League)	0	–		1	0
Spartak Moscow	2014–15	RPL	10	3	0	0	–		–		10	3
Spartak Moscow	Total		11	3	0	0	1	0	0	0	12	3
Spartak-2 Moscow	2013–14	PFL	23	6	–		–		–		23	6
Spartak-2 Moscow	2014–15	PFL	17	6	–		–		–		17	6
Spartak-2 Moscow	2015–16	FNL	7	1	–		–		–		7	1
Spartak-2 Moscow	Total		47	13	0	0	0	0	0	0	47	13
Ufa	2015–16	RPL	20	2	3	2	–		–		23	4
Ufa	2016–17	RPL	24	0	3	0	–		–		27	0
Ufa	2017–18	RPL	15	3	1	0	–		–		16	3
Ufa	2018–19	RPL	19	1	1	0	4	0	2 (Note: Appearances in the relegation play-offs)	0	26	1
Ufa	2019–20	RPL	21	3	1	0	–		–		22	3
Ufa	2020–21	RPL	23	2	3	1	–		–		26	3
Ufa	2021–22	RPL	25	0	2	0	–		–		27	0
Ufa	Total		147	11	14	3	4	0	2	0	167	14
Pari NN	2022–23	RPL	15	1	4	0	–		–		19	1
Career total			244	29	21	3	5	0	2	0	272	32
