= Dmitry Izotov =

Russian footballer and coach

Personal information
- Full name: Dmitry Sergeyevich Izotov
- Date of birth: 14 April 1984 (age 42)
- Place of birth: Moscow, Russia
- Height: 1.92 m (6 ft 3 1/2 in)
- Position: Goalkeeper

Team information
- Current team: FC Dynamo Moscow (GK coach)

Youth career
- FShM-Torpedo Moscow

Senior career*
Years	Team	Apps	(Gls)
2001–2002	FC Torpedo Moscow	0	(0)
2004	FC Vidnoye	2	(0)
2005	FC Energetik Uren	17	(0)
2006	FC SOYUZ-Gazprom Izhevsk	25	(0)
2007	FC Spartak-MZhK Ryazan	16	(0)
2007	FC Zvezda Irkutsk	3	(0)
2008	FC Dynamo Bryansk	11	(0)
2009	FC Torpedo-ZIL Moscow	23	(0)
2010	FC Baltika Kaliningrad	0	(0)
2010	→ FC Torpedo-ZIL Moscow (loan)	4	(0)
2011–2014	FC Ufa	7	(0)

Managerial career
- 2019: FC Dynamo Moscow (U21 GK coach)
- 2019–: FC Dynamo Moscow (GK coach)
- * Club domestic league appearances and goals

Dmitry Sergeyevich Izotov (Russian: Дми́трий Серге́евич Изо́тов; born 14 April 1984) is a Russian professional association football coach and a former player. He is the goalkeepers' coach with FC Dynamo Moscow. He played as a goalkeeper.

== Club career ==
He played 3 seasons in the Russian Football National League for 4 different teams.
