= Pavlo Stepanets =

Ukrainian-Russian footballer

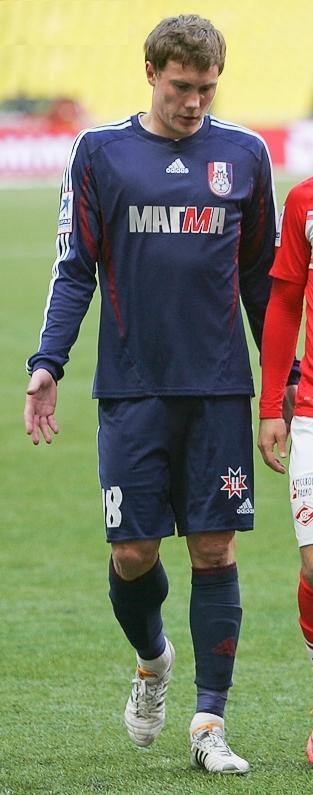
- Stepanets with Mordovia in 2012

Personal information
- Full name: Pavlo Mykolayovych Stepanets
- Date of birth: 26 May 1987 (age 39)
- Place of birth: Horodnia, Chernihiv Oblast, Ukrainian SSR
- Height: 1.81 m (5 ft 11 1/2 in)
- Position: Midfielder

Youth career
- 2000–2002: RVUFK Kyiv

Senior career*
| Years | Team | Apps | (Gls) |
| 2004–2005 | CSKA Moscow | 0 | (0) |
| 2006 | Spartak Nizhny Novgorod | 26 | (1) |
| 2007–2008 | Dynamo-2 Kyiv | 20 | (2) |
| 2009–2010 | Ural Sverdlovsk Oblast | 36 | (1) |
| 2011–2013 | Mordovia Saransk | 55 | (0) |
| 2013–2015 | Ufa | 24 | (0) |
| 2015–2017 | Fakel Voronezh | 9 | (0) |
| 2017–2018 | Baltika Kaliningrad | 13 | (0) |
| 2018 | → Tyumen (loan) | 8 | (0) |
| 2018–2019 | Luch Vladivostok | 51 | (1) |
| 2020 | Ararat Yerevan | 10 | (0) |
| 2020 | Urartu | 0 | (0) |

International career
| 2002 | Ukraine-16 | 4 | (0) |
| 2007 | Ukraine-21 | 2 | (0) |
- * Club domestic league appearances and goals

Pavlo Mykolayovych Stepanets (Ukrainian: Павло Миколайович Степанець; born 26 May 1987) is a Ukrainian former professional football player. He also holds Russian citizenship as Pavel Nikolayevich Stepanets (Russian: Павел Николаевич Степанец).

== Career ==
On 29 February 2020, Stepanets signed for Ararat Yerevan.

After being released by Ararat Yerevan on 24 July 2020, Stepanets signed for FC Urartu on 12 September 2020. His contract was terminated by mutual consent on 12 January 2021.
