= Aleksandr Vasilyev (footballer, born 1992) =

Russian footballer

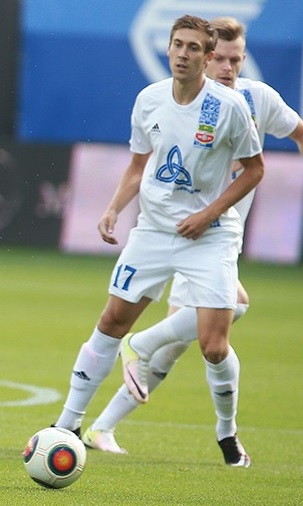
- Vasilyev with Neftekhimik in 2016

Personal information
- Full name: Aleksandr Nikolayevich Vasilyev
- Date of birth: 23 January 1992 (age 34)
- Place of birth: Nizhegorodka, Bashkortostan, Russia
- Height: 1.85 m (6 ft 1 in)
- Positions: Forward; midfielder

Senior career*
Years	Team	Apps	(Gls)
2009–2013	PFC CSKA Moscow	0	(0)
2012	→ FC Yenisey Krasnoyarsk (loan)	8	(0)
2012–2013	→ FC Ufa (loan)	19	(1)
2013–2014	FC Rostov	0	(0)
2014	→ FC Sibir Novosibirsk (loan)	9	(0)
2014–2016	FC Ufa	9	(0)
2015	→ FC Tyumen (loan)	2	(0)
2015–2016	→ FC Torpedo Armavir (loan)	29	(2)
2016	→ FC Neftekhimik Nizhnekamsk (loan)	12	(0)
2017	FC Stumbras	2	(0)
2018–2019	FC Avanhard-Inkomsport Yalta		
2019–2020	FC Rubin Yalta		

International career
2010	Russia U-18	6	(3)
2011	Russia U-19	8	(2)
2012	Russia U-20	4	(1)
2013	Russia U-21	6	(0)
- * Club domestic league appearances and goals

Aleksandr Nikolayevich Vasilyev (Russian: Александр Николаевич Васильев; born 23 January 1992) is a Russian former professional football player.

== Club career ==
He made his professional debut for PFC CSKA Moscow on 2 December 2010 in a 2010–11 UEFA Europa League game against FC Lausanne-Sport.
