= Dynamo Stadium (Ufa) =

Multi-purpose stadium in Russia

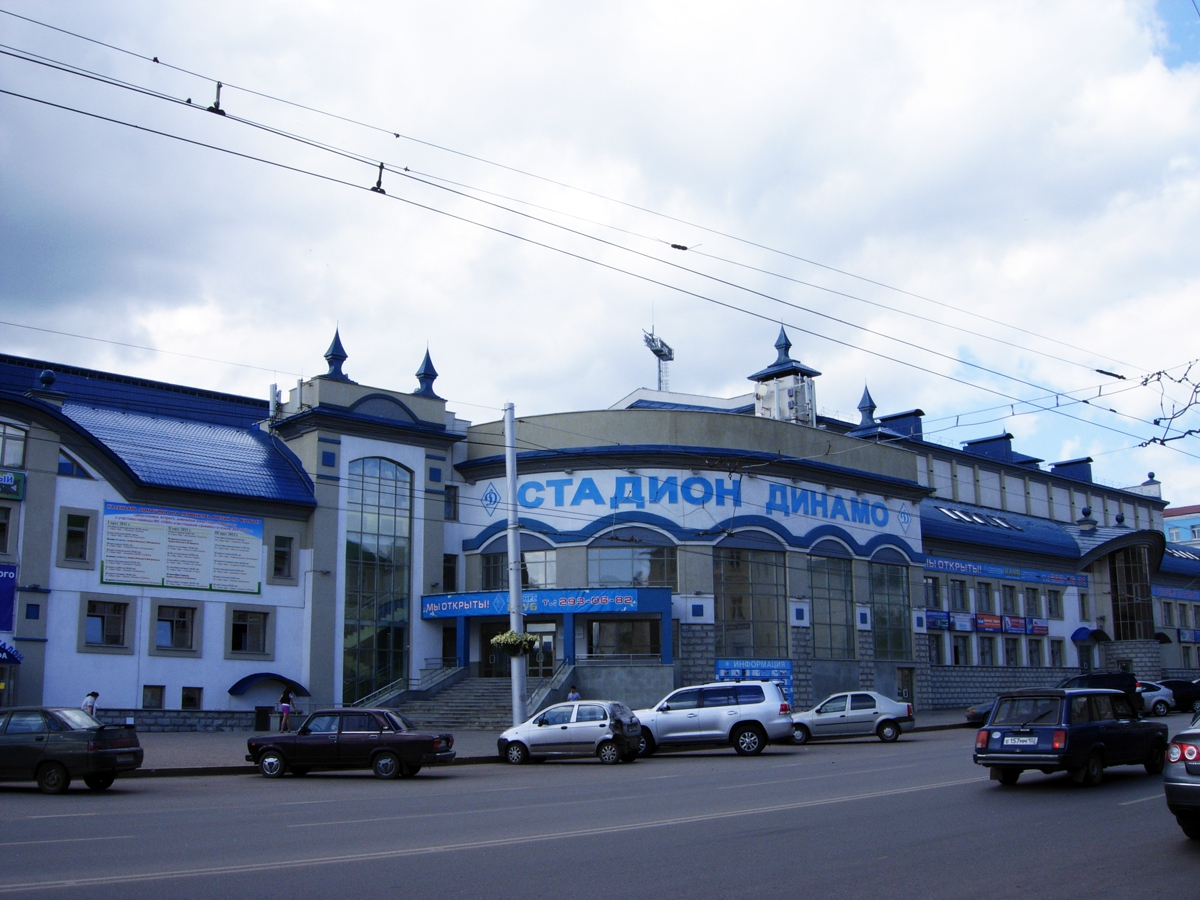
- Interactive map of Dynamo Stadium
- Full name: Dynamo Stadium
- Address: Ulitsa Karla Marksa 2
- Location: Ufa, Russia
- Coordinates: 54°43′08″N 55°56′19″E
- Owner: Ministry of Internal Affairs (Bashkortostan)
- Capacity: 5,000
- Surface: Artificial turf
- Field size: 100x69m

Construction
- Built: 1930
- Opened: 1934
- Renovated: 2007
- Cost: 729,867,000 Russian Rubles
- Main contractor: JSC Construction Trust No. 3

Tenant
- FC Ufa (2009-2015)

Dynamo Stadium is a multi-purpose stadium in Ufa, Russia. It was used mostly for football matches and was the home stadium of FC Ufa prior to their move to Neftyanik Stadium in 2015. The stadium stand has capacity for 5,000 people.

== History ==
The Dynamo Stadium was completed in 1934.

The first football match in the stadium and Bashkortostan took place in 1959 between Stroitel Ufa and SC Motor Jena from East Germany in an international friendly.

Dynamo Stadium was the home stadium for FC Bashinformsvyaz-Dynamo Ufa. FC Ufa formed to replace the former inherited the stadium as its home ground until the renovation of Neftyanik Stadium in 2015.

Dynamo Stadium is now the home ground for Kirovets bandy club.

== Specifications ==
The stadium capacity is designed for 5,000 spectators. The football field measures 100×69 metres with artificial turf without a heating system.

In addition to the football field, the stadium infrastructure also includes athletics tracks (400 metres), tennis courts, a swimming pool, shooting range, a hotel for 32 visitors, as well as a sports hall with stands for 1,000 seats, where matches of the Russian Volleyball Championship are held.
