= Nikolai Safronidi =

Russian footballer (born 1983)

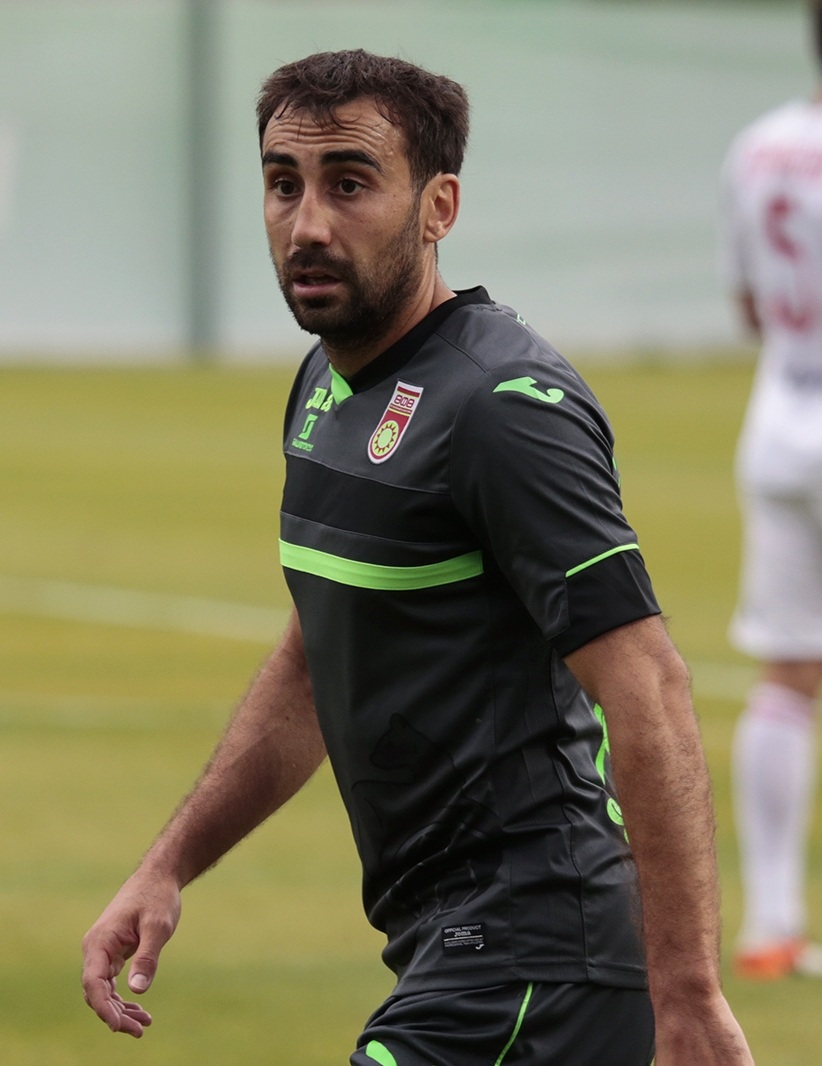
- Safronidi in 2017

Personal information
- Full name: Nikolai Afanasyevich Safronidi
- Date of birth: 10 September 1983 (age 43)
- Place of birth: Ordzhonikidze, Russian SFSR
- Height: 1.75 m (5 ft 9 in)
- Position: Midfielder

Team information
- Current team: Alania Vladikavkaz (assistant coach)

Senior career*
Years	Team	Apps	(Gls)
2000	Avtodor Vladikavkaz	0	(0)
2001–2004	Alania Vladikavkaz	0	(0)
2004–2007	Mashuk-KMV Pyatigorsk	90	(10)
2008–2009	SKA-Energiya Khabarovsk	53	(7)
2010–2013	Ural Sverdlovsk Oblast	99	(7)
2014–2018	Ufa	48	(2)
Total		290	(26)

Managerial career
- 2018–2019: Ufa (administrator)
- 2019–2023: Ufa (assistant)
- 2021: Ufa (caretaker)
- 2024–: Alania Vladikavkaz (assistant)
- * Club domestic league appearances and goals

Nikolai Afanasyevich Safronidi (Russian: Николай Афанасьевич Сафрониди, Greek: Νικόλαος Σαφρονίδης, romanized: Nikolaos Safronidis; born 10 September 1983) is a Russian professional football coach and a former player who is an assistant manager of Alania Vladikavkaz. He played as a left midfielder.

== Personal life ==
He is of Caucasus Greek and Armenian descent.

== Career statistics ==
Appearances and goals by club, season and competition
Club	Season	League			Cup		Continental		Other		Total	
Club	Season	Division	Apps	Goals	Apps	Goals	Apps	Goals	Apps	Goals	Apps	Goals
FC Avtodor Vladikavkaz	2000	PFL	0	0	0	0	–		–		0	0
Alania Vladikavkaz	2001	Russian Premier League	0	0	0	0	–		–		0	0
Alania Vladikavkaz	2002	Russian Premier League	0	0	0	0	–		–		0	0
Alania Vladikavkaz	2003	Russian Premier League	0	0	0	0	–		–		0	0
Alania Vladikavkaz	2004	Russian Premier League	0	0	0	0	–		–		0	0
Alania Vladikavkaz	Total		0	0	0	0	0	0	0	0	0	0
Mashuk-KMV Pyatigorsk	2004	PFL	9	1	0	0	–		–		9	1
Mashuk-KMV Pyatigorsk	2005	PFL	16	1	2	0	–		–		18	1
Mashuk-KMV Pyatigorsk	2006	FNL	28	2	1	0	–		–		29	2
Mashuk-KMV Pyatigorsk	2007	FNL	37	6	1	0	–		–		38	6
Mashuk-KMV Pyatigorsk	Total		90	10	4	0	0	0	0	0	94	10
SKA-Energiya Khabarovsk	2008	FNL	21	2	1	0	–		–		22	2
SKA-Energiya Khabarovsk	2009	FNL	32	5	3	0	–		–		35	5
SKA-Energiya Khabarovsk	Total		53	7	4	0	0	0	0	0	57	7
Ural Sverdlovsk Oblast	2010	FNL	33	3	1	1	–		–		34	4
Ural Sverdlovsk Oblast	2011–12	FNL	31	3	2	1	–		–		33	4
Ural Sverdlovsk Oblast	2012–13	FNL	26	1	2	0	–		–		28	1
Ural Sverdlovsk Oblast	2013–14	Russian Premier League	9	0	1	0	–		–		10	0
Ural Sverdlovsk Oblast	Total		99	7	6	2	0	0	0	0	105	9
FC Ufa	2013–14	FNL	6	0	–		–		2 (Note: Two appearances in promotion play-offs)	0	8	0
FC Ufa	2014–15	Russian Premier League	23	1	2	0	–		–		25	1
FC Ufa	2015–16	Russian Premier League	15	1	2	0	–		–		17	1
FC Ufa	2016–17	Russian Premier League	2	0	1	0	–		–		3	0
FC Ufa	2017–18	Russian Premier League	2	0	1	0	–		–		3	0
FC Ufa	Total		48	2	6	0	0	0	2	0	56	2
Career total			290	26	20	2	0	0	2	0	312	28
