= Yevgeni Osipov =

Russian footballer

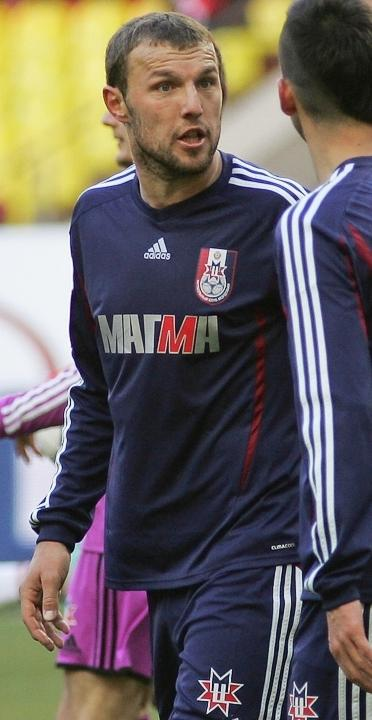
- Osipov with Mordovia in 2012

Personal information
- Full name: Yevgeni Vladislavovich Osipov
- Date of birth: 29 October 1986 (age 40)
- Place of birth: Temryuk, Krasnodar Krai, Russian SFSR
- Height: 1.89 m (6 ft 2 in)
- Position: Centre back

Youth career
- SDYuSShOR-5 Krasnodar

Senior career*
Years	Team	Apps	(Gls)
2007–2008	Orenburg	42	(5)
2009–2011	Zhemchuzhina-Sochi	70	(8)
2011–2013	Mordovia Saransk	42	(3)
2013–2014	Ufa	21	(4)
2014–2015	Arsenal Tula	24	(2)
2015–2016	Ufa	13	(0)
2016–2017	Mordovia Saransk	37	(3)
2017	Orenburg	4	(0)
2017	Orenburg-2	6	(0)
2018	Trakai	29	(3)
2019–2020	FCI Levadia	9	(1)
2020–2021	Urartu	13	(0)
2021–2023	Shinnik Yaroslavl	52	(7)
2023–2026	Kuban Krasnodar	55	(2)
- * Club domestic league appearances and goals as of 13 July 2026

Yevgeni Vladislavovich Osipov (Russian: Евгений Владиславович Осипов; born 29 October 1986) is a Russian former professional football player.

== Career ==
On 16 January 2020, FC Urartu announced the signing of Osipov.
