= Maksim Semakin =

Russian footballer

Personal information
- Full name: Maksim Valeryevich Semakin
- Date of birth: 26 October 1983 (age 43)
- Place of birth: Krasnoyarsk, Russian SFSR
- Height: 1.79 m (5 ft 10 in)
- Position: Midfielder

Senior career*
Years	Team	Apps	(Gls)
2004–2006	FC Metallurg Krasnoyarsk	99	(9)
2008	FC Kuban Krasnodar	10	(0)
2008–2010	FC Volga Nizhny Novgorod	78	(6)
2011–2013	FC Ural Sverdlovsk Oblast	69	(3)
2013–2017	FC Ufa	45	(3)
2016	→ FC Luch-Energiya Vladivostok (loan)	11	(0)
2016–2017	→ FC Yenisey Krasnoyarsk (loan)	24	(1)
2017–2021	FC Yenisey Krasnoyarsk	36	(1)
- * Club domestic league appearances and goals

Maksim Valeryevich Semakin (Russian: Максим Валерьевич Семакин; born 26 October 1983) is a Russian former professional football player. He played as a defensive midfielder.

== Club career ==
He made his Russian Premier League debut for FC Ufa on 8 August 2014 in a game against FC Amkar Perm.
