= Ilmir Yakupov =

Russian footballer

Personal information
- Full name: Ilmir Fanilyevich Yakupov
- Date of birth: 17 March 1994 (age 32)
- Place of birth: Podymalovo, Ufimsky District, Russia
- Height: 1.85 m (6 ft 1 in)
- Position: Forward

Senior career*
Years	Team	Apps	(Gls)
2011–2013	FC Ufa-2		
2014–2015	FC Ufa	0	(0)
2015–2016	FC Sibir Novosibirsk	14	(1)
2015–2016	FC Sibir-2 Novosibirsk	14	(3)
2016–2017	FC Avangard Kursk	4	(0)
- * Club domestic league appearances and goals

Ilmir Fanilyevich Yakupov (Russian: Ильмир Фанильевич Якупов; born 17 March 1994) is a Russian former football player.

He made his professional debut in the Russian Football National League for FC Sibir Novosibirsk on 11 July 2015 in a game against FC Volgar Astrakhan.
