= Maksim Tishkin =

Russian footballer

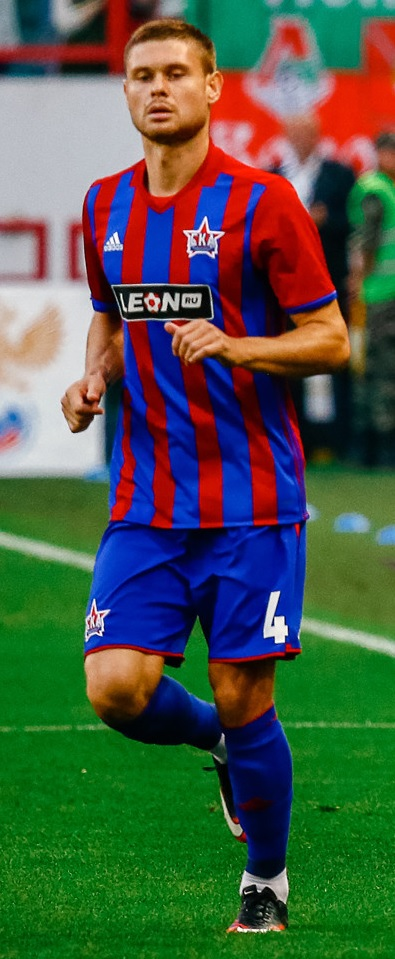
- Tishkin with SKA-Khabarovsk in 2017

Personal information
- Full name: Maksim Viktorovich Tishkin
- Date of birth: 11 November 1989 (age 37)
- Place of birth: Bolshaya Yelkhovka, Russian SFSR
- Height: 1.82 m (6 ft 0 in)
- Position: Right-back

Youth career
- FC Mordovia Saransk

Senior career*
| Years | Team | Apps | (Gls) |
| 2006–2010 | FC Mordovia Saransk | 50 | (0) |
| 2010 | → FC Zvezda Ryazan (loan) | 26 | (0) |
| 2011–2012 | FC Spartak Kostroma | 35 | (1) |
| 2012–2015 | FC Ufa | 66 | (1) |
| 2015–2016 | FC Mordovia Saransk | 18 | (0) |
| 2016 | FC Tom Tomsk | 14 | (0) |
| 2017 | FC Baltika Kaliningrad | 0 | (0) |
| 2017 | FC SKA-Khabarovsk | 3 | (0) |
| 2018–2023 | FC Baltika Kaliningrad | 111 | (4) |
- * Club domestic league appearances and goals

Maksim Viktorovich Tishkin (Russian: Максим Викторович Тишкин; born on 11 November 1989) is a Russian former professional football player. He played as a right back.

== Club career ==
He made his Russian Premier League debut for FC Ufa on 3 August 2014 in a game against FC Kuban Krasnodar.
