= Nikita Bezlikhotnov =

Russian professional football player

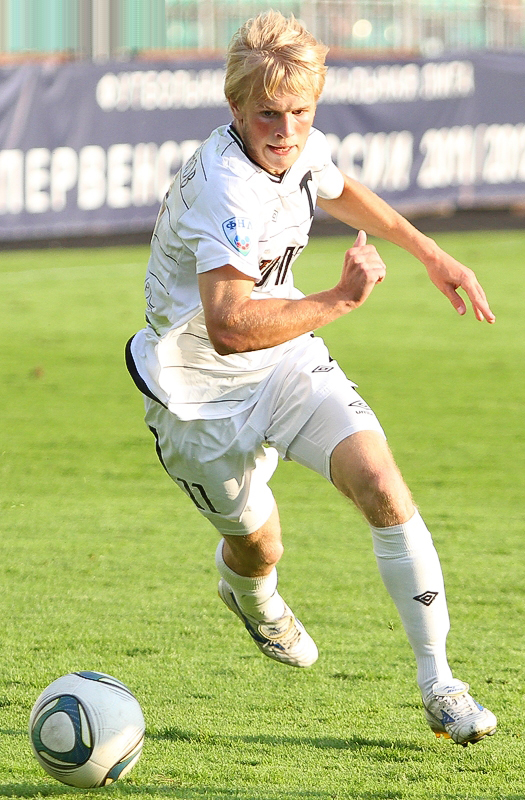

Personal information
- Full name: Nikita Sergeyevich Bezlikhotnov
- Date of birth: 19 August 1990 (age 36)
- Place of birth: Moscow, Russian SFSR
- Height: 1.80 m (5 ft 11 in)
- Position: Midfielder

Youth career
- Torpedo Moscow

Senior career*
Years	Team	Apps	(Gls)
2009–2010	Torpedo-ZIL Moscow	35	(1)
2011–2013	Torpedo Moscow	69	(8)
2013–2014	Kuban Krasnodar	9	(0)
2013	→ Metalurh Donetsk (loan)	4	(2)
2014–2016	Ufa	4	(0)
2015	→ Baltika Kaliningrad (loan)	12	(2)
2015–2016	→ SKA-Energiya Khabarovsk (loan)	18	(0)
2016–2017	Sibir Novosibirsk	30	(1)
2017–2018	Shinnik Yaroslavl	31	(3)
2018–2020	Armavir	57	(9)
2020	Kyzylzhar	3	(0)
2020–2021	SKA-Khabarovsk	14	(1)

International career
2009	Russia U19	4	(0)
2012	Russia-2	1	(0)
2013	Russia U21	3	(0)
- * Club domestic league appearances and goals

Nikita Sergeyevich Bezlikhotnov (Russian: Никита Серге́евич Безлихотнов; born 19 August 1990) is a Russian former professional football player.

== Club career ==
He made his Russian Premier League debut for Kuban Krasnodar on 10 March 2014 in a game against Rostov.

On 9 September 2020, Bezlikhotnov signed for Kyzylzhar.

== Career statistics ==
Club	Season	League			Cup		Continental		Other		Total	
Club	Season	Division	Apps	Goals	Apps	Goals	Apps	Goals	Apps	Goals	Apps	Goals
Torpedo-ZIL Moscow	2009	Russian Second League	20	1	3	0	–		–		23	1
Torpedo-ZIL Moscow	2010	Russian Second League	15	0	1	0	–		–		16	0
Torpedo-ZIL Moscow	Total		35	1	4	0	0	0	0	0	39	1
Torpedo Moscow	2011–12	Russian First League	41	1	0	0	–		–		41	1
Torpedo Moscow	2012–12	Russian First League	28	7	2	0	–		–		30	7
Torpedo Moscow	Total		69	8	2	0	0	0	0	0	71	8
Kuban Krasnodar	2013–14	Russian Premier League	9	0	0	0	1 (Note: Appearance in the UEFA Europa League)	0	–		10	0
Metalurh Donetsk (loan)	2013–14	Ukrainian Premier League	4	2	0	0	–		–		4	2
Ufa	2014–15	Russian Premier League	4	0	1	0	–		–		5	0
Ufa	2015–16	Russian Premier League	0	0	–		–		–		0	0
Ufa	Total		4	0	1	0	0	0	0	0	5	0
Baltika Kaliningrad (loan)	2014–15	Russian First League	12	2	–		–		1 (Note: Appearances in the FNL Cup)	0	13	2
SKA-Energiya Khabarovsk (loan)	2015–16	Russian First League	18	0	2	0	–		2	0	22	0
Sibir Novosibirsk	2016–17	Russian First League	30	1	3	0	–		–		33	1
Shinnik Yaroslavl	2017–18	Russian First League	31	3	5	1	–		5	2	41	6
Armavir	2018–19	Russian First League	33	6	1	0	–		–		34	6
Armavir	2019–20	Russian First League	24	3	0	0	–		–		24	3
Armavir	Total		57	9	1	0	0	0	0	0	58	9
Kyzylzhar	2020	Kazakhstan Premier League	3	0	–		–		–		3	0
SKA-Khabarovsk	2020–21	Russian First League	14	1	1	0	–		–		15	1
Career total			286	27	19	1	1	0	8	2	314	30
