= 2018–19 FC Ufa season =

FC Ufa
2018–19 season
- Chairman: Marat Magadeyev
- Manager: Sergei Tomarov (until 7 November); Dmitri Kirichenko (7 November - 27 March); Vadim Evseev (from 27 March)
- Stadium: Neftyanik Stadium
- Premier League: 14th
- Russian Cup: Round of 32 vs Nizhny Novgorod
- Europa League: Playoff round vs Rangers
- Relegation play-offs: Winners vs Tom Tomsk
- Top goalscorer: League: Sylvester Igboun (9); All: Sylvester Igboun (11)
Home colours	Away colours	Third colours

The 2018–19 FC Ufa season was their fifth successive season in the Russian Premier League, the highest tier of association football in Russia, and sixth in total.

== Season events ==
During pre-season, manager Sergei Semak left by mutual consent, to become manager of Zenit St.Petersburg. On 13 June, Sergei Tomarov was appointed as the club's new manager, but resigned on 7 November 2018 being replaced by Dmitri Kirichenko. Kirichenko left Ufa by mutual consent on 27 March, with Vadim Evseev becoming Ufa's third manager of the season on the same day.

== Squad ==
Note: Flags indicate national team as defined under FIFA eligibility rules; some limited exceptions apply. Players may hold more than one non-FIFA nationality.

No.	Pos.	Nation	Player
1	GK	RUS	Aleksei Chernov
3	DF	RUS	Pavel Alikin
4	DF	RUS	Aleksei Nikitin
5	DF	SLO	Bojan Jokić
6	MF	SUI	Vero Salatić
7	MF	RUS	Dmitri Sysuyev
8	MF	MDA	Cătălin Carp
9	MF	CZE	Ondřej Vaněk
11	FW	SLO	Lovro Bizjak
13	MF	RUS	Azamat Zaseyev
15	DF	RUS	Aleksandr Putsko
16	GK	RUS	Yury Shafinsky
17	DF	RUS	Dmitri Zhivoglyadov

No.	Pos.	Nation	Player
19	MF	CRO	Ivan Paurević
27	DF	ROU	Ionuț Nedelcearu
29	MF	LUX	Olivier Thill
31	GK	RUS	Aleksandr Belenov
32	FW	SLO	Andrés Vombergar
33	DF	RUS	Aleksandr Sukhov
44	FW	NGR	Sylvester Igboun
55	DF	GEO	Jemal Tabidze
56	DF	RUS	Danil Krugovoy
57	FW	RUS	Vyacheslav Krotov
77	MF	RUS	Azer Aliyev
87	MF	RUS	Igor Bezdenezhnykh
88	GK	RUS	Timur Akmurzin (on loan from Rubin Kazan)

=== Out on loan ===
Note: Flags indicate national team as defined under FIFA eligibility rules; some limited exceptions apply. Players may hold more than one non-FIFA nationality.

No.	Pos.	Nation	Player
10	FW	KAZ	Yerkebulan Seidakhmet (at Levski Sofia)
78	DF	RUS	Igor Diveyev (at CSKA Moscow)

No.	Pos.	Nation	Player
—	DF	MDA	Victor Patrașco (at Luch-Energiya Vladivostok)
—	MF	RUS	Andrei Batyutin (at Avangard Kursk)

== Transfers ==
=== In ===
Date	Position	Nationality	Name	From	Fee	Ref.
18 June 2018	DF	(Russia)	Danil Krugovoy	Zenit-2 St. Petersburg	Undisclosed	
14 August 2018	FW	(Slovenia)	Lovro Bizjak	Domžale	Undisclosed	
31 August 2018	MF	(Russia)	Azer Aliyev	Krylia Sovetov	Free	
3 February 2018	GK	(Russia)	Yury Shafinsky	Tom Tomsk	Undisclosed	
16 February 2019	FW	(Slovenia)	Andrés Vombergar	Olimpija Ljubljana	Undisclosed	

=== Out ===
Date	Position	Nationality	Name	To	Fee	Ref.
15 May 2018	MF	(Russia)	Dmitry Stotsky	Krasnodar	Undisclosed	
31 August 2018	MF	(Russia)	Ivan Oblyakov	CSKA Moscow	Undisclosed	
8 February 2019	FW	(Russia)	Islamnur Abdulavov	Tom Tomsk	Undisclosed	

=== Loans in ===
Date from	Position	Nationality	Name	To	Date to	Ref.
Winter 2019	GK	(Russia)	Timur Akmurzin	Rubin Kazan	End of Season	

=== Loans out ===
Date from	Position	Nationality	Name	To	Date to	Ref.
13 June 2018	MF	(Russia)	Andrei Batyutin	Avangard Kursk	End of Season	
29 June 2018	FW	(Russia)	Islamnur Abdulavov	Rotor Volgograd	8 February 2019	
5 July 2018	DF	(Moldova)	Victor Patrașco	Luch-Energiya Vladivostok	End of Season	
22 February 2019	DF	(Russia)	Igor Diveyev	Ufa	End of Season	
28 February 2019	FW	(Kazakhstan)	Yerkebulan Seydakhmet	Levski Sofia	31 December 2019	

=== Released ===
Date	Position	Nationality	Name	Joined	Date	Ref.
13 June 2018	MF	(Russia)	Nikolai Safronidi	Retired		
14 August 2018	FW	(Nigeria)	Kehinde Fatai	Dinamo Minsk	30 August 2018	
1 December 2018	MF	(Russia)	Vladimir Zubarev			
11 January 2019	GK	(Russia)	Giorgi Shelia	Tambov	16 January 2019	
27 January 2019	DF	(Russia)	Denis Tumasyan	Alashkert	27 January 2019	
	GK	(Russia)	Nikita Yatsenko			
	MF	(Russia)	Yevgeni Bazhanov			
	FW	(Russia)	Daniil Zaplakhov			

== Friendlies ==
16 November 2018 Korantina Homes Cup Semifinal	Pafos (Cyprus)	1 – 2	(Russia) Ufa	Pegeia, Cyrus
16:30 MSK (UTC+3)	Holt 62'	Report	Bizjak 52'; Bezdenezhnykh 87'	Stadium: Dimotiko Stadio Pegias

18 November 2018 Korantina Homes Cup Final	Ufa (Russia)	1 – 1 (4 – 3 p)	(Latvia) Riga	Pegeia, Cyrus
15:00 MSK (UTC+3)	Paurević 9'	Report	Biliński 59' (pen.)	Stadium: Dimotiko Stadio Pegias
	Penalties
	Diveyev (penalty scored); Putsko (penalty scored); Krotov (penalty missed); Zhivoglyadov (penalty scored); Bezdenezhnykh (penalty scored)		Biliński (penalty scored); Primão (penalty missed); Panić (penalty scored); A.Pētersons (penalty missed); Brisola (penalty missed)

== Competitions ==
=== Russian Premier League ===
==== Results by round ====
Round	1	2	3	4	5	6	7	8	9	10	11	12	13	14	15	16	17	18	19	20	21	22	23	24	25	26	27	28	29	30
Ground	H	H	H	A	H	A	H	A	H	A	H	A	H	H	A	A	A	H	A	H	A	H	A	H	A	H	A	A	H	A
Result	D	W	L	L	L	L	L	D	W	D	D	D	L	W	L	D	D	L	L	L	D	W	D	L	D	W	D	L	L	L
Position	8	3	6	11	11	14	15	15	14	15	14	14	14	14	14	13	14	15	15	15	15	14	14	14	14	14	14	14	14	14

Updated to match(es) played on 26 May 2019. Source: See Results
A = Away; H = Home; W = Win; D = Draw; L = Loss

==== Results ====
30 July 2018 1	Ufa	0 – 0	Lokomotiv Moscow	Ufa
20:00 YEKT (UTC+5)	Nedelcearu (yellow card) 54'; Igboun (yellow card) 77' (penalty missed) 90+4'; Tumasyan (yellow card) 81'	Report		Stadium: Neftyanik Stadium; Attendance: 8,368; Referee: Mikhail Vilkov

6 August 2018 2	Ufa	3 – 0	Anzhi Makhachkala	Ufa
19:30 YEKT (UTC+5)	Igboun 3'; Vaněk 87', 89'	Report	Belorukov (yellow card) 38'	Stadium: Neftyanik Stadium; Attendance: 5,612; Referee: Sergei Karasev

13 August 2018 3	Ufa	0 – 1	Krasnodar	Ufa
19:30 YEKT (UTC+5)	Carp (yellow card) 29'; Vaněk (yellow card) 37'	Report	Ramírez (yellow card) 35' (yellow-red card) 90+3'; Wanderson 86'	Stadium: Neftyanik Stadium; Attendance: 7,016; Referee: Aleksei Matyunin

20 August 2018 4	Dynamo Moscow	3 – 0	Ufa	Khimki
21:30 YEKT (UTC+5)	Šunjić (yellow card) 50'; Sow (yellow card) 58'; Panchenko 63'; Lutsenko 84'; Joãozinho 90+4'	Report	Tumasyan (yellow card) 70'	Stadium: Arena Khimki; Attendance: 6,125; Referee: Vladimir Moskalev

26 August 2018 5	Ufa	0 – 2	Zenit St.Petersburg	Ufa
18:30 YEKT (UTC+5)	Paurević (yellow card) 49'; Oblyakov (yellow card) 54'; Alikin (yellow card) 63'; Jokić (yellow card) 68' (red card) 68'; Krotov (yellow card) 89'	Report	Paurević 3' (o.g.); Dzyuba 11'; Yerokhin (yellow card) 69'; Paredes (yellow card) 83'	Stadium: Neftyanik Stadium; Attendance: 10,587; Referee: Nikolay Voloshin

2 September 2018 6	Akhmat Grozny	2 – 1	Ufa	Grozny
23:30 YEKT (UTC+5)	Ángel (yellow card) 23'; Shvets (yellow card) 43'; Mitrishev 57', 59'; Berisha (yellow card) 90+4'	Report	Tumasyan (yellow card) 4'; Nedelcearu (yellow card) 75'; Carp 82'; Sukhov (yellow card) 88'	Stadium: Akhmat-Arena; Attendance: 10,288; Referee: Stanislav Vasilyev

15 September 2018 7	Ufa	0 – 3	CSKA Moscow	Ufa
16:30 YEKT (UTC+5)	Paurević (yellow card) 47'; Sukhov (yellow card) 69'; Seidakhmet (yellow card) 85'	Report	Magnússon (yellow card) 13'; Chalov 45+2'; Zhamaletdinov 59', 63'	Stadium: Neftyanik Stadium; Attendance: 7,129; Referee: Sergey Lapochkin

22 September 2018 8	Rostov	0 – 0	Ufa	Rostov-on-Don
21:00 YEKT (UTC+5)	Wilusz (yellow card) 29'	Report	Igboun (yellow card) 17'; Tabidze (yellow card) 71'; Carp (yellow card) 87'	Stadium: Rostov Arena; Attendance: 35,337; Referee: Vasiliy Kazartsev

29 September 2018 9	Ufa	2 – 1	Yenisey Krasnoyarsk	Ufa
18:30 YEKT (UTC+5)	Sysuyev (yellow card) 35'; Krotov 46' (yellow card) 63'; Igboun 69'	Report	Kostyukov 35'; Zotov (yellow card) 55'; Ogude (yellow card) 57'; Komolov (yellow card) 77'	Stadium: Neftyanik Stadium; Attendance: 3,187; Referee: Sergey Ivanov

5 October 2018 10	Arsenal Tula	1 – 1	Ufa	Tula
21:30 YEKT (UTC+5)	Kostadinov 70'	Report	Sysuyev (yellow card) 19'; Igboun 45+2'; Carp (yellow card) 90+4'	Stadium: Arsenal Stadium; Attendance: 8,752; Referee: Sergei Karasev

20 October 2018 11	Ufa	0 – 0	Rubin Kazan	Ufa
18:30 YEKT (UTC+5)	Thill (yellow card) 68'; Salatić (yellow card) 76'	Report	Bayramyan (yellow card) 38'; Ustinov (yellow card) 71'	Stadium: Neftyanik Stadium; Attendance: 5,166; Referee: Roman Galimov

27 October 2018 12	Ural Yekaterinburg	1 – 1	Ufa	Yekaterinburg
16:00 YEKT (UTC+5)	Haroyan (yellow card) 37'; Bicfalvi 61'; Fidler (yellow card) 77' (yellow-red card) 86'; Balažic (yellow card) 89'	Report	Salatić (yellow card) 32'; Alikin 44'; Thill (yellow card) 68'	Stadium: Central Stadium; Attendance: 11,432; Referee: Aleksey Eskov

5 November 2018 13	Ufa	1 – 2	Krylia Sovetov	Ufa
18:30 YEKT (UTC+5)	Sysuyev 67'; Salatić (yellow card) 85'	Report	Samardžić 18'; Anton (yellow card) 57'; Zotov (yellow card) 89'; Yakovlev 90+2'	Stadium: Neftyanik Stadium; Attendance: 4,056; Referee: Vladislav Bezborodov

11 November 2018 14	Ufa	2 – 0	Spartak Moscow	Ufa
16:00 YEKT (UTC+5)	Thill (yellow card) 56'; Putsko (yellow card) 72'; Sysuyev 75', (yellow card) 78'; Carp (yellow card) 89'; Bizjak 90+2'	Report	Popov (yellow card) 70'; Kutepov (yellow card) 86'	Stadium: Neftyanik Stadium; Attendance: 10,224; Referee: Kirill Levnikov

24 November 2018 15	Orenburg	1 – 0	Ufa	Orenburg
18:30 YEKT (UTC+5)	Popović (penalty missed) 58'; Sutormin 80'	Report	Alikin (yellow card) 52' (yellow-red card) 59'; Belenov (yellow card) 59'	Stadium: Gazovik Stadium; Attendance: 3,167; Referee: Vitaly Meshkov

1 December 2018 16	Anzhi Makhachkala	0 – 0	Ufa	Kaspiysk
21:00 YEKT (UTC+5)	Chaykovskiy (yellow card) 48'; Dolgov (yellow card) 49'; Kulik (penalty missed) 77'	Report	Carp (yellow card) 49'; Tabidze (yellow card) 69'; Bizjak (yellow card) 78'; Nikitin (yellow card) 84'	Stadium: Anzhi Arena; Attendance: 1,655; Referee: Mikhail Vilkov

9 December 2018 17	Krasnodar	1 – 1	Ufa	Krasnodar
18:30 YEKT (UTC+5)	Ignatyev 26'; Spajić (yellow card) 50'	Report	Thill 14'; Bizjak (yellow card) 61'; Carp (yellow card) 64'; Salatić (yellow card) 84'; Igboun (yellow card) 87'	Stadium: Krasnodar Stadium; Attendance: 21,167; Referee: Aleksey Eskov

3 March 2019 18	Ufa	1 – 2	Dynamo Moscow	Ufa
13:30 YEKT (UTC+5)	Igboun 32'; Paurević (yellow card) 72'; Alikin (yellow card) 81'; Jokić (yellow card) 86'; Nedelcearu (yellow card) 90+2'	Report	Yusupov (yellow card) 13'; Tetteh (yellow card) 45+1'; Lutsenko 60'; Kozlov (yellow card) 67'; Šunjić (yellow card) 78'; Grulyov 90+4'	Stadium: Neftyanik Stadium; Attendance: 10,926; Referee: Sergey Lapochkin

10 March 2019 19	Zenit St.Petersburg	2 – 1	Ufa	Saint Petersburg
18:30 YEKT (UTC+5)	Azmoun 30'; Rigoni 34'	Report	Bizjak (yellow card) 15'; Carp 25'; Igboun (yellow card) 67'	Stadium: Krestovsky Stadium; Attendance: 42,464; Referee: Aleksei Eskov

17 March 2019 20	Ufa	0 – 1	Akhmat Grozny	Ufa
16:00 YEKT (UTC+5)	Vaněk (yellow card) 2'; Zhivoglyadov (yellow card) 24'	Report	Ismael (yellow card) 33'; Mohammadi (yellow card) 62'; Shvets 72'	Stadium: Neftyanik Stadium; Attendance: 8,526; Referee: Vitali Meshkov

31 March 2019 21	CSKA Moscow	2 – 2	Ufa	Moscow
18:30 YEKT (UTC+5)	Vlašić 25'; Chalov 64'	Report	Jokić (yellow card) 26'; Thill (yellow card) 79'; Bizjak 87'; Igboun 90+3'	Stadium: VEB Arena; Attendance: 21,655; Referee: Sergey Ivanov

7 April 2019 22	Ufa	1 – 0	Rostov	Ufa
13:30 YEKT (UTC+5)	Igboun 25'; Carp (yellow card) 54'; Jokić (yellow card) 90+2'	Report	Zaynutdinov (yellow card) 24'; Normann (yellow card) 71'	Stadium: Neftyanik Stadium; Attendance: 10,287; Referee: Aleksei Matyunin

13 April 2019 23	Yenisey Krasnoyarsk	0 – 0	Ufa	Krasnoyarsk
13:30 YEKT (UTC+5)	Kichin (yellow card) 17'	Report	Thill (penalty missed) 7'; Carp (yellow card) 15'; Zhivoglyadov (yellow card) 45'	Stadium: Central Stadium; Attendance: 6,778; Referee: Sergei Karasev

20 April 2019 24	Ufa	1 – 2	Arsenal Tula	Ufa
13:30 YEKT (UTC+5)	Jokić (yellow card) 7'; Bezdenezhnykh (yellow card) 26'; Igboun 38'; Nedelcearu (yellow card) 63'; Sysuyev (yellow card) 83'	Report	Bakayev 3'; Gorbatenko 24'; Grigalava (yellow card) 47'; Berkhamov (yellow card) 70'	Stadium: Neftyanik Stadium; Attendance: 7,835; Referee: Vladimir Moskalyov

24 April 2019 25	Rubin Kazan	1 – 1	Ufa	Kazan
21:30 YEKT (UTC+5)	Mogilevets (yellow card) 5'; Sorokin (yellow card) 36' (goal) 71'; Akbashev (yellow card) 84'	Report	Carp (yellow card) 21'; Krugovoy 45+2'	Stadium: Kazan Arena; Attendance: 5,866; Referee: Sergey Lapochkin

28 April 2019 26	Ufa	4 – 1	Ural Yekaterinburg	Ufa
13:30 YEKT (UTC+5)	Vombergar 22'; Vaněk 52' (pen.); Igboun 79', 90+1'	Report	Bicfalvi 16'; Bryzgalov (red card) 58'	Stadium: Neftyanik Stadium; Attendance: 7,156; Referee: Mikhail Vilkov

5 May 2019 27	Krylia Sovetov	1 – 1	Ufa	Samara
16:00 YEKT (UTC+5)	Timofeyev 12' (yellow card) 20'; Samardžić (yellow card) 81'	Report	Nedelcearu (yellow card) 41' (goal) 90+3'	Stadium: Samara Arena; Attendance: 15,836; Referee: Vitaly Meshkov

12 May 2019 28	Spartak Moscow	1 – 0	Ufa	Moscow
18:30 YEKT (UTC+5)	Zé Luís 11'; Zobnin (yellow card) 39'	Report	Igboun (yellow card) 42'; Carp (yellow card) 45+1'; Thill (yellow card) 77'	Stadium: Otkritie Arena; Attendance: 25,538; Referee: Pavel Kukuyan

18 May 2019 29	Ufa	0 – 2	Orenburg	Ufa
16:00 YEKT (UTC+5)	Salatić (yellow card) 73'; Alikin (yellow card) 83'	Report	Alves 15'; Miškić 87'	Stadium: Neftyanik Stadium; Attendance: 9,134; Referee: Aleksei Matyunin

26 May 2019 30	Lokomotiv Moscow	1 – 0	Ufa	Moscow
16:00 YEKT (UTC+5)	Fernandes 39' (penalty missed) 50'; Idowu (yellow card) 54'	Report	Igboun (yellow card) 77'	Stadium: RZD Arena; Attendance: 18,183; Referee: Sergey Ivanov

==== League table ====
Pos	Team	Pld	W	D	L	GF	GA	GD	Pts	Qualification or relegation
12	Dynamo Moscow	30	6	15	9	28	28	0	33	
13	Krylia Sovetov Samara (O)	30	8	4	18	25	46	−21	28	Qualification for the Relegation play-offs
14	Ufa (O)	30	5	11	14	24	34	−10	26	Qualification for the Relegation play-offs
15	Anzhi Makhachkala (R)	30	5	6	19	13	50	−37	21	Relegation to Football National League
16	Yenisey Krasnoyarsk (R)	30	4	8	18	24	55	−31	20	Relegation to Football National League

Updated to match(es) played on 26 May 2019. Source: Russian Premier League, Soccerway
Rules for classification: 1) Points; 2) Head-to-head points; 3) Head-to-head matches won; 4) Head-to-head goal difference; 5) Head-to-head goals scored; 6) Head-to-head away goals; 7) Matches won; 8) Goal difference; 9) Goals scored; 10) Away goals scored; 11) Play-off.
(O) Play-off winner; (R) Relegated

==== Relegation play-offs ====
30 May 2019 1st Leg	Ufa	2 – 0	Tom Tomsk	Ufa
19:00 YEKT (UTC+5)	Igboun 28'; Nedelcearu (yellow card) 80'; Ediyev 81' (o.g.); Zhivoglyadov (yellow card) 85'	Report	Smirnov (yellow card) 44'	Stadium: Neftyanik Stadium; Attendance: 9,384; Referee: Mikhail Vilkov

2 June 2019 2nd Leg	Tom Tomsk	1 – 0 (1 – 2 agg.)	Ufa	Tomsk
16:00 YEKT (UTC+5)	Gasilin 11'	Report	Nedelcearu (yellow card) 41'; Igboun (yellow card) 71'; Belenov (yellow card) 90+4' (yellow-red card) 90+5'	Stadium: Trud Stadium; Attendance: 6,210; Referee: Vitaly Meshkov

=== Russian Cup ===
26 September 2018 Round of 32	Nizhny Novgorod	0 – 0 (a.e.t.) (5 – 3 p)	Ufa	Nizhny Novgorod
21:00 YEKT (UTC+5)	Khripkov (yellow card) 9'; Spătaru (yellow card) 46'	Report	Salatić (yellow card) 13'; Sysuyev (yellow card) 99'; Diveyev (yellow card) 106'	Stadium: Nizhny Novgorod Stadium; Attendance: 17,193; Referee: Vitaly Meshkov
	Penalties
	Skvortsov (penalty scored); Fomin (penalty scored); Čirjak (penalty missed); Sapeta (penalty scored); Ignatovich (penalty scored)		Sysuyev (penalty scored); Diveyev (penalty scored); Krotov (penalty missed); Zaseyev (penalty scored)

=== UEFA Europa League ===
==== Qualifying rounds ====
26 July 2018 Second qualifying round 1st leg	Ufa (Russia)	0 – 0	(Slovenia) Domžale	Ufa, Russia
19:00 YEKT (UTC+5)	Tabidze (yellow card) 60'; Jokić (yellow card) 63'; Nedelcearu (yellow card) 71'	Report	Čerin (yellow card) 49'; Husmani (yellow card) 66'	Stadium: Neftyanik Stadium; Attendance: 11,210; Referee: Donatas Rumšas (Lithuania)

2 August 2018 Second qualifying round 2nd leg	Domžale (Slovenia)	1 – 1 (1 – 1 agg.)	(Russia) Ufa	Domžale, Slovenia
22:30 YEKT (UTC+5)	Ibraimi (yellow card) 36'; Bizjak 50'; Husmani (yellow card) 75'	Report	Jokić (yellow card) 36' (goal) 87'	Stadium: Domžale Sports Park; Referee: Arnold Hunter (Northern Ireland)

9 August 2018 Third qualifying round 1st leg	Ufa (Russia)	2 – 1	(Luxembourg) Progrès Niederkorn	Ufa, Russia
19:00 YEKT (UTC+5)	Igboun 38'; Salatić (yellow card) 45'; Oblyakov 64'	Report	Hall (yellow card) 23'; Mutsch (yellow card) 58'; Gobron (yellow card) 72'; Karapetian 80' da Graça (yellow card) 87'	Stadium: Neftyanik Stadium; Attendance: 6,794; Referee: Stephan Klossner (Switzerland)

16 August 2018 Third qualifying round 2nd leg	Progrès Niederkorn (Luxembourg)	2 – 2 (4 – 3 agg.)	(Russia) Ufa	Differdange, Luxembourg
20:00 YEKT (UTC+5)	Alikin 2' (o.g.); O.Thill (yellow card) 42'; De Almeida 72'	Report	Paurević (yellow card) 19' (goal) 51', 90+4'	Stadium: Stade Municipal; Referee: Manuel Schüttengruber (Austria)
Note: Progrès Niederkorn played their home matches at Stade Municipal, Differdange, instead of their regular stadium Stade Jos Haupert, Niederkorn.

23 August 2018 Playoff round 1st leg	Rangers (Scotland)	1 – 0	(Russia) Ufa	Glasgow, Scotland
23:45 YEKT (UTC+5)	Goldson 41' (yellow card) 90+4'; Lafferty (yellow card) 72'	Report	Igboun (yellow card) 57'; Zaseyev (yellow card) 76'; Paurević (yellow card) 90'	Stadium: Ibrox Stadium; Attendance: 49,338; Referee: Daniel Stefański (Poland)

30 August 2018 Playoff round 2nd leg	Ufa (Russia)	1 – 1 (1 – 2 agg.)	(Scotland) Rangers	Ufa, Russia
YEKT (UTC+5)	Sysuyev 32'; Salatić (yellow card) 34'; Paurević (yellow card) 82'; Igboun (yellow card) 86'	Report	Ejaria 9'; Flanagan (yellow card) 15' (yellow-red card) 66'; Morelos (yellow card) 37' (yellow-red card) 38'	Stadium: Neftyanik Stadium; Referee: Tobias Stieler (Germany)

== Squad statistics ==
As of match played 2 June 2019

=== Appearances and goals ===
No.	Pos	Nat	Player	Total		Premier League		Russian Cup		Europa League		Relegation Playoff	
No.	Pos	Nat	Player	Apps	Goals	Apps	Goals	Apps	Goals	Apps	Goals	Apps	Goals
3	DF	(Russia) RUS	Pavel Alikin	24	1	20+1	1	0	0	3	0	0	0
4	DF	(Russia) RUS	Aleksei Nikitin	13	0	9+1	0	1	0	0	0	2	0
5	DF	(Slovenia) SLO	Bojan Jokić	28	1	20	0	0	0	6	1	2	0
6	MF	(Switzerland) SUI	Vero Salatić	21	0	11+2	0	1	0	6	0	1	0
7	MF	(Russia) RUS	Dmitri Sysuyev	26	3	20+2	2	0+1	0	1	1	1+1	0
8	MF	(Moldova) MDA	Cătălin Carp	31	2	23+1	2	0	0	2+3	0	1+1	0
9	MF	(Czech Republic) CZE	Ondřej Vaněk	23	3	11+6	3	1	0	2+2	0	0+1	0
11	FW	(Slovenia) SLO	Lovro Bizjak	21	2	8+12	2	1	0	0	0	0	0
13	MF	(Russia) RUS	Azamat Zaseyev	9	0	2+3	0	1	0	1+2	0	0	0
15	DF	(Russia) RUS	Aleksandr Putsko	17	0	17	0	0	0	0	0	0	0
17	DF	(Russia) RUS	Dmitri Zhivoglyadov	29	0	20+1	0	0	0	6	0	2	0
19	MF	(Croatia) CRO	Ivan Paurević	29	2	13+9	0	0	0	5	2	2	0
27	DF	(Romania) ROU	Ionuț Nedelcearu	34	1	26	1	0	0	6	0	2	0
29	MF	(Luxembourg) LUX	Olivier Thill	25	1	18+4	1	0+1	0	0	0	1+1	0
31	GK	(Russia) RUS	Aleksandr Belenov	37	0	29	0	0	0	6	0	2	0
32	FW	(Slovenia) SLO	Andrés Vombergar	13	1	5+6	1	0	0	0	0	1+1	0
33	DF	(Russia) RUS	Aleksandr Sukhov	18	0	12+2	0	1	0	0+1	0	2	0
44	FW	(Nigeria) NGR	Sylvester Igboun	35	11	25+2	9	0	0	6	1	2	1
55	DF	(Georgia (country)) GEO	Jemal Tabidze	19	0	12	0	0+1	0	6	0	0	0
56	DF	(Russia) RUS	Danil Krugovoy	9	1	8+1	1	0	0	0	0	0	0
57	FW	(Russia) RUS	Vyacheslav Krotov	25	1	8+11	1	0	0	1+3	0	1+1	0
77	MF	(Russia) RUS	Azer Aliyev	14	0	0+13	0	1	0	0	0	0	0
87	MF	(Russia) RUS	Igor Bezdenezhnykh	6	0	4+2	0	0	0	0	0	0	0
Players away from the club on loan:
10	FW	(Kazakhstan) KAZ	Yerkebulan Seidakhmet	2	0	0+1	0	1	0	0	0	0	0
78	DF	(Russia) RUS	Igor Diveyev	3	0	1+1	0	1	0	0	0	0	0
Players who left Ufa during the season:
20	DF	(Russia) RUS	Denis Tumasyan	9	0	3+1	0	1	0	3+1	0	0	0
21	FW	(Nigeria) NGR	Kehinde Fatai	5	0	1+1	0	0	0	1+2	0	0	0
88	GK	(Russia) RUS	Giorgi Shelia	2	0	1	0	1	0	0	0	0	0
98	MF	(Russia) RUS	Ivan Oblyakov	11	1	4+1	0	0	0	5+1	1	0	0

=== Goal scorers ===
Place	Position	Nation	Number	Name	Premier League	Russian Cup	Europa League	Relegation Playoff	Total
1	FW	(Nigeria)	44	Sylvester Igboun	9	0	1	1	11
2	MF	(Czech Republic)	9	Ondřej Vaněk	3	0	0	0	3
2	MF	(Russia)	7	Dmitri Sysuyev	2	0	1	0	3
4	MF	(Moldova)	8	Cătălin Carp	2	0	0	0	2
4	FW	(Slovenia)	11	Lovro Bizjak	2	0	0	0	2
4	MF	(Croatia)	19	Ivan Paurević	0	0	2	0	2
7	FW	(Russia)	57	Vyacheslav Krotov	1	0	0	0	1
7	DF	(Russia)	3	Pavel Alikin	1	0	0	0	1
7	MF	(Luxembourg)	29	Olivier Thill	1	0	0	0	1
7	DF	(Russia)	56	Danil Krugovoy	1	0	0	0	1
7	FW	(Slovenia)	32	Andrés Vombergar	1	0	0	0	1
7	DF	(Romania)	27	Ionuț Nedelcearu	1	0	0	0	1
7	DF	(Slovenia)	5	Bojan Jokić	0	0	1	0	1
7	MF	(Russia)	98	Ivan Oblyakov	0	0	1	0	1
7				Own goal	0	0	0	1	1
				TOTALS	24	0	6	2	30

=== Disciplinary record ===
Number	Nation	Position	Name	Premier League		Russian Cup		Europa League		Relegation Playoff		Total	
Number	Nation	Position	Name	Yellow card	Red card	Yellow card	Red card	Yellow card	Red card	Yellow card	Red card	Yellow card	Red card
3	(Russia)	DF	Pavel Alikin	5	1	0	0	0	0	0	0	5	1
4	(Russia)	DF	Aleksei Nikitin	1	0	0	0	0	0	0	0	1	0
5	(Slovenia)	DF	Bojan Jokić	5	1	0	0	2	0	0	0	7	1
6	(Switzerland)	MF	Vero Salatić	5	0	1	0	2	0	0	0	8	0
7	(Russia)	MF	Dmitri Sysuyev	4	0	1	0	0	0	0	0	5	0
8	(Moldova)	MF	Cătălin Carp	10	0	0	0	0	0	0	0	10	0
9	(Czech Republic)	MF	Ondřej Vaněk	2	0	0	0	0	0	0	0	2	0
11	(Slovenia)	FW	Lovro Bizjak	3	0	0	0	0	0	0	0	3	0
13	(Russia)	MF	Azamat Zaseyev	0	0	0	0	1	0	0	0	1	0
15	(Russia)	DF	Aleksandr Putsko	1	0	0	0	0	0	0	0	1	0
17	(Russia)	DF	Dmitri Zhivoglyadov	2	0	0	0	0	0	1	0	3	0
19	(Croatia)	MF	Ivan Paurević	3	0	0	0	3	0	0	0	6	0
27	(Romania)	DF	Ionuț Nedelcearu	5	0	0	0	1	0	2	0	8	0
29	(Luxembourg)	MF	Olivier Thill	5	0	0	0	0	0	0	0	5	0
31	(Russia)	GK	Aleksandr Belenov	1	0	0	0	0	0	2	1	3	1
33	(Russia)	DF	Aleksandr Sukhov	2	0	0	0	0	0	0	0	2	0
44	(Nigeria)	FW	Sylvester Igboun	6	0	0	0	2	0	1	0	9	0
55	(Georgia (country))	DF	Jemal Tabidze	2	0	0	0	1	0	0	0	3	0
57	(Russia)	FW	Vyacheslav Krotov	2	0	0	0	0	0	0	0	2	0
87	(Russia)	MF	Igor Bezdenezhnykh	1	0	0	0	0	0	0	0	1	0
Players away on loan:
10	(Kazakhstan)	FW	Yerkebulan Seidakhmet	1	0	0	0	0	0	0	0	1	0
78	(Russia)	DF	Igor Diveyev	0	0	1	0	1	0	0	0	2	0
Players who left Ufa during the season:
20	(Russia)	DF	Denis Tumasyan	3	0	0	0	0	0	0	0	3	0
98	(Russia)	MF	Ivan Oblyakov	1	0	0	0	0	0	0	0	1	0
			TOTALS	70	2	3	0	12	0	6	1	91	3
