= 2016–17 FC Ufa season =

FC Ufa
2016–17 season
- Chairman: Marat Magadeyev
- Manager: Viktor Goncharenko (until 12 December); Sergei Semak (from 30 December)
- Stadium: Neftyanik Stadium
- Russian Premier League: 7th
- Russian Cup: Semifinal vs Lokomotiv Moscow
- Top goalscorer: League: Kehinde Fatai (6); All: Kehinde Fatai (6)
Home colours	Away colours

The 2016–17 FC Ufa season was the 3rd successive season that the club will play in the Russian Premier League, the highest tier of association football in Russia, and 3rd in total. Ufa are also playing in the Russian Cup.

== Season events ==
On 6 June 2016, Hancharenka was appointed as manager of FC Ufa. On 12 December 2016, Hancharenka left Ufa by mutual consent, with Sergei Semak being appointed as the club's new manager on 30 December 2016.

== Squad ==
As of 24 February 2017

Note: Flags indicate national team as defined under FIFA eligibility rules; some limited exceptions apply. Players may hold more than one non-FIFA nationality.

No.	Pos.	Nation	Player
1	GK	RUS	Mikhail Borodko
2	DF	RUS	Oleksandr Filin
3	DF	RUS	Pavel Alikin
4	DF	RUS	Aleksei Nikitin
5	DF	SLO	Bojan Jokić
7	MF	RUS	Dmitri Sysuyev
9	MF	CZE	Ondřej Vaněk
13	MF	RUS	Azamat Zaseyev
17	DF	RUS	Dmitri Zhivoglyadov
19	MF	CRO	Ivan Paurević
20	DF	RUS	Denis Tumasyan
21	FW	NGR	Kehinde Fatai
22	DF	MDA	Victor Patrașco

No.	Pos.	Nation	Player
31	GK	RUS	Aleksandr Belenov
33	DF	RUS	Aleksandr Sukhov
39	MF	RUS	Dmitry Stotsky
44	FW	NGR	Sly
45	DF	RUS	Aleksandr Putsko
57	FW	RUS	Vyacheslav Krotov
60	MF	RUS	Vladimir Zubarev
70	MF	RUS	Nikolai Safronidi
87	MF	RUS	Igor Bezdenezhnykh
88	GK	RUS	Giorgi Shelia
93	DF	MDA	Cătălin Carp
98	MF	RUS	Ivan Oblyakov
99	FW	RUS	Islamnur Abdulavov

=== Youth team ===
Note: Flags indicate national team as defined under FIFA eligibility rules; some limited exceptions apply. Players may hold more than one non-FIFA nationality.

No.	Pos.	Nation	Player
23	FW	RUS	Danila Yemelyanov
37	DF	RUS	Ruslan Khaziyev
47	MF	RUS	Artyom Yegorov
51	MF	RUS	Mark Krivorog
53	GK	RUS	Gleb Yefimov
54	GK	RUS	Yegor Pozdnyakov
55	GK	RUS	Daniil Lyasov
63	MF	RUS	Radmir Zaripov
65	MF	RUS	Maksim Lysenkov
67	FW	RUS	Artyom Shitov
69	DF	RUS	Nikita Popov

No.	Pos.	Nation	Player
72	MF	RUS	Valentin Videneyev
75	DF	RUS	Artyom Nadeyev
78	DF	RUS	Igor Diveyev
80	MF	RUS	Dmitri Belozyorov
81	DF	RUS	Anton Ladygin
86	MF	RUS	Daniel Gumerov
89	MF	RUS	Maksim Sidorov
90	FW	RUS	Vyacheslav Zhuravlyov
91	MF	RUS	Andrey Vlasov
92	FW	RUS	Vyacheslav Dyomin

== Transfers ==
=== Summer ===
In: Note: Flags indicate national team as defined under FIFA eligibility rules; some limited exceptions apply. Players may hold more than one non-FIFA nationality.

No.	Pos.	Nation	Player
1	GK	RUS	Mikhail Borodko (from (Russia) Yenisey Krasnoyarsk)
5	DF	RUS	Viktor Vasin (on loan from (Russia) CSKA Moscow)
9	MF	CZE	Ondřej Vaněk (from (Czech Republic) Viktoria Plzeň)
17	DF	RUS	Dmitri Zhivoglyadov (from (Russia) Dynamo Moscow)
21	FW	NGR	Kehinde Fatai (from (Czech Republic) Sparta Prague)
30	GK	UKR	Bohdan Sarnavskyi (from (Ukraine) Shakhtar Donetsk)
55	GK	RUS	Daniil Lyasov
67	FW	RUS	Artyom Shitov
72	MF	RUS	Valentin Videneyev (from (Russia) Konoplyov football academy)
75	DF	RUS	Artyom Nadeyev
77	MF	RUS	Andrei Batyutin (from (Russia) Krasnodar)
81	DF	RUS	Anton Ladygin
86	MF	RUS	Daniel Gumerov
89	MF	RUS	Maksim Sidorov
91	MF	RUS	Andrey Vlasov
95	DF	RUS	Dmitri Tashbulatov (from (Russia) Akademiya Ufa)
96	MF	RUS	Renat Yusupov (from (Russia) CSKA Moscow)
98	MF	RUS	Ivan Oblyakov (from (Russia) Zenit St. Petersburg academy)
99	FW	RUS	Islamnur Abdulavov (from (Russia) Anzhi Makhachkala)

Out: Note: Flags indicate national team as defined under FIFA eligibility rules; some limited exceptions apply. Players may hold more than one non-FIFA nationality.

No.	Pos.	Nation	Player
6	FW	GER	Marvin Pourié (end of loan from (Denmark) Copenhagen)
7	DF	RUS	Yevgeni Osipov (to (Russia) Mordovia Saransk)
9	FW	BIH	Haris Handžić (to (Croatia) Rijeka)
17	MF	UKR	Oleksandr Zinchenko (to (England) Manchester City)
19	MF	CRO	Ivan Paurević (to (England) Huddersfield Town)
34	DF	RUS	Aleksandr Katsalapov (to (Russia) Orenburg)
42	GK	RUS	Sergei Narubin (to (Russia) Dynamo Moscow)
55	MF	RUS	Artur Sitdikov
75	DF	RUS	Ilya Ponomaryov
79	MF	RUS	Al-Khan Samba
—	GK	RUS	David Yurchenko (to (Russia) Anzhi Makhachkala, previously on loan)
—	MF	RUS	Nikita Bezlikhotnov (to (Russia) Sibir Novosibirsk, previously on loan to (Russia) SKA-Energiya Khabarovsk)
—	MF	RUS	Anton Kilin (to (Russia) Luch-Energiya Vladivostok, previously on loan to (Russia) KAMAZ Naberezhnye Chelny)
—	MF	RUS	Maksim Semakin (on loan to (Russia) Yenisey Krasnoyarsk, previously on loan to (Russia) Luch-Energiya Vladivostok)
—	MF	RUS	Aleksandr Vasilyev (on loan to (Russia) Neftekhimik Nizhnekamsk, previously on loan to (Russia) Torpedo Armavir)

=== Winter ===
In: Note: Flags indicate national team as defined under FIFA eligibility rules; some limited exceptions apply. Players may hold more than one non-FIFA nationality.

No.	Pos.	Nation	Player
5	DF	SLO	Bojan Jokić (from (Spain) Villarreal)
19	MF	CRO	Ivan Paurević (from (England) Huddersfield Town)
22	DF	MDA	Victor Patrașco (from (Moldova) Academia Chișinău)
31	GK	RUS	Aleksandr Belenov (from (Russia) Anzhi Makhachkala)
45	DF	RUS	Aleksandr Putsko (from (Russia) Spartak Moscow)
56	GK	RUS	Igor Ozhiganov
66	FW	RUS	Timur Kutlusurin (from (Russia) Zenit Salavat)
85	DF	RUS	Damir Yunusov
93	DF	MDA	Cătălin Carp (from (Romania) Viitorul Constanța)
94	FW	RUS	Linar Mukhametshin
96	FW	RUS	Nikita Tikhonov

Out: Note: Flags indicate national team as defined under FIFA eligibility rules; some limited exceptions apply. Players may hold more than one non-FIFA nationality.

No.	Pos.	Nation	Player
5	DF	RUS	Viktor Vasin (end of loan from (Russia) CSKA Moscow)
8	MF	RUS	Semyon Fomin
10	MF	BRA	Marcinho (to (Turkey) Gaziantepspor)
11	FW	BRA	Diego Carlos
30	GK	UKR	Bohdan Sarnavskyi (to (Ukraine) Vorskla Poltava)
52	GK	RUS	Ruslan Agayev
65	MF	RUS	Maksim Lysenkov
66	FW	RUS	Ilya Blinnikov
71	GK	RUS	Andrey Lunyov (to (Russia) Zenit St. Petersburg)
77	MF	RUS	Andrei Batyutin (to (Russia) Zenit-2 St. Petersburg)
83	DF	RUS	Yegor Romanovsky
94	MF	RUS	Azat Valimakhmetov
95	DF	RUS	Dmitri Tashbulatov
96	MF	RUS	Renat Yusupov
97	FW	RUS	Denis Zizenkov
—	MF	RUS	Aleksandr Vasilyev (released, previously on loan to (Russia) Neftekhimik Nizhnekamsk)

== Competitions ==
=== Russian Premier League ===
==== Results by round ====
Round	1	2	3	4	5	6	7	8	9	10	11	12	13	14	15	16	17	18	19	20	21	22	23	24	25	26	27	28	29	30
Ground	A	H	A	H	A	H	A	A	H	A	H	A	H	A	H	A	H	A	H	A	H	H	A	H	A	H	A	H	A	H
Result	L	D	L	L	W	D	W	W	D	L	D	W	L	W	W	L	W	W	W	D	L	L	D	L	L	W	L	W	D	W
Position	14	12	16	16	13	13	9	9	9	10	9	9	10	9	8	9	8	6	5	5	5	6	7	9	9	7	7	7	8	7

Updated to match(es) played on 21 May 2017. Source: See Results
A = Away; H = Home; W = Win; D = Draw; L = Loss

==== Matches ====
31 July 2016 1	Ural Yekaterinburg	2 – 0	Ufa	Yekaterinburg
17:30 YEKT (UTC+5)	Yemelyanov 5'; Dantsev (yellow card) 38'; Pavlyuchenko 43'	Summary	Vaněk (yellow card) 40'; Stotsky (yellow card) 44'	Stadium: SKB-Bank Arena; Attendance: 7,850; Referee: Sergey Ivanov

6 August 2016 2	Ufa	0 – 0	Zenit St.Petersburg	Ufa
19:00 YEKT (UTC+5)	Alikin (yellow card) 71'	Summary	Kokorin (yellow card) 52'; Criscito (yellow card) 79'; Neto (yellow card) 87'; Witsel (yellow card) 90'	Stadium: Neftyanik Stadium; Attendance: 7,800; Referee: Vitali Meshkov

14 August 2016 3	Tom Tomsk	1 – 0	Ufa	Tomsk
17:30 YEKT (UTC+5)	Samodin 9'; Puljić (yellow card) 54'; Ciupercă (yellow card) 69'	Summary	Stotsky (yellow card) 42'; Bezdenezhnykh (yellow card) 53'	Stadium: Trud Stadium; Attendance: 6,873; Referee: Sergey Lapochkin

20 August 2016 4	Ufa	1 – 3	Terek Grozny	Ufa
16:30 YEKT (UTC+5)	Nikitin (yellow card) 34'; Oblyakov (yellow card) 69'; Fatai 75' (yellow card) 90+1'	Summary	Grozav (yellow card) 19' (goal) 89'; Balaj 48'; Ivanov (yellow card) 79'; Rodolfo (yellow card) 81'; Sadayev 87'	Stadium: Neftyanik Stadium; Attendance: 4,800; Referee: Igor Fedotov

26 August 2016 5	Krylia Sovetov	0 – 1	Ufa	Samara
20:30 YEKT (UTC+5)	Chochiyev (yellow card) 66'	Summary	Stotsky (yellow card) 50'; Alikin (yellow card) 61' (yellow-red card) 87'; Zubarev (yellow card) 65'; Igboun 83' (pen.); Krotov (yellow card) 86'; Shelia (yellow card) 90+4'	Stadium: Metallurg Stadium; Attendance: 9,082; Referee: Alexander Yegorov

11 September 2016 6	Ufa	0 – 0	Krasnodar	Ufa
16:00 YEKT (UTC+5)	Krotov (yellow card) 59'; Oblyakov (yellow card) 76'; Igboun (yellow card) 83'	Summary	Petrov (yellow card) 88'	Stadium: Neftyanik Stadium; Attendance: 5,800; Referee: Vladimir Seldyakov

17 September 2016 7	Lokomotiv Moscow	0 – 1	Ufa	Moscow
21:00 YEKT (UTC+5)		Summary	Vasin (yellow card) 56'; Ćorluka 69' (o.g.); Bezdenezhnykh (yellow card) 71'; Alikin (yellow card) 77'	Stadium: Lokomotiv Stadium; Attendance: 9,714; Referee: Vitali Meshkov

25 September 2016 8	Spartak Moscow	0 – 1	Ufa	Moscow
21:00 YEKT (UTC+5)	Maurício (yellow card) 23'; Popov (yellow card) 87'	Summary	Fatai 39'; Alikin (yellow card) 44'; Bezdenezhnykh (yellow card) 57'	Stadium: Otkrytiye Arena; Attendance: 26,117; Referee: Roman Galimov

2 October 2016 9	Ufa	1 – 1	Amkar Perm	Ufa
16:00 YEKT (UTC+5)	Fatai 52'; Igboun (yellow card) 54'	Summary	Stotsky 75' (o.g.); Gol (yellow card) 90+3'	Stadium: Neftyanik Stadium; Attendance: 9,050; Referee: Sergey Lapochkin

14 October 2016 10	CSKA Moscow	1 – 0	Ufa	Moscow
21:30 YEKT (UTC+5)	Golovin (yellow card) 10'; Berezutski 18'; Wernbloom (yellow card) 51'; Tošić (yellow card) 59'	Summary	Bezdenezhnykh (yellow card) 24'; Krotov (yellow card) 69'	Stadium: Arena CSKA; Attendance: 9,800; Referee: Mikhail Vilkov

22 October 2016 11	Ufa	0 – 0	Rostov	Ufa
16:30 YEKT (UTC+5)	Fatai (yellow card) 41'; Stotsky (yellow card) 45+2'; Vaněk (yellow card) 46'	Summary	Gueye (yellow card) 72'	Stadium: Neftyanik Stadium; Attendance: 7,200; Referee: Evgeny Turbin

30 October 2016 12	Arsenal Tula	0 – 2	Ufa	Tula
15:30 YEKT (UTC+5)	Vergara (yellow card) 50'; Khagush (yellow card) 52'	Summary	Igboun (yellow card) 7' (goal) 45+1'; Nikitin (yellow card) 25'; Zaseyev (yellow card) 52'; Bezdenezhnykh (yellow card) 64'; Fatai 80'	Stadium: Arsenal Stadium; Attendance: 7,050; Referee: Alexander Yegorov

5 November 2016 13	Ufa	2 – 3	Rubin Kazan	Ufa
15:30 YEKT (UTC+5)	Shelia (red card) 8'; Sysuyev 45+2' (yellow card) 82'; Stotsky 49'; Zaseyev (yellow card) 76' (yellow-red card) 86'	Summary	Jonathas 18' (pen.); Rochina 28' (yellow card) 89'; Nabiullin 51'; Burlak (yellow card) 72'; Sánchez (yellow card) 79'	Stadium: Neftyanik Stadium; Attendance: 6,900; Referee: Aleksei Eskov

19 November 2016 14	Anzhi Makhachkala	0 – 1	Ufa	Kaspiysk
19:00 YEKT (UTC+5)	Yakovlev (yellow card) 90'	Summary	Vaněk 63'; Sukhov (yellow card) 73'; Oblyakov (yellow card) 79'; Bezdenezhnykh (yellow card) 81'	Stadium: Anzhi Arena; Attendance: 3,700; Referee: Sergey Ivanov

25 November 2016 15	Ufa	1 – 0	Orenburg	Ufa
19:00 YEKT (UTC+5)	Sysuyev (yellow card) 20'; Vaněk 39'; Igboun (yellow card) 44'; Marcinho (yellow card) 90+4'	Summary	Poluyakhtov (yellow card) 38'; Afonin (yellow card) 44'; Vorobyov (yellow card) 89'	Stadium: Neftyanik Stadium; Attendance: 5,350; Referee: Vladimir Moskalyov

30 November 2016 16	Zenit St.Petersburg	2 – 0	Ufa	Saint Petersburg
21:30 YEKT (UTC+5)	Neto (yellow card) 44'; Giuliano 84'; Kokorin 90+3'	Summary	Bezdenezhnykh (yellow card) 49'	Stadium: Petrovsky Stadium; Attendance: 15,813; Referee: Mikhail Vilkov

5 December 2016 17	Ufa	1 – 0	Tom Tomsk	Ufa
15:00 YEKT (UTC+5)	Sysuyev (yellow card) 35'; Zaseyev (yellow card) 59'; Sukhov 64'	Summary	Sobolev (yellow card) 13'; Zhirov (yellow card) 41'; Kombarov (yellow card) 71'; Balyaikin (yellow card) 90'; Dudiyev (red card) 90'	Stadium: Neftyanik Stadium; Attendance: 3,152; Referee: Aleksei Matyunin

5 March 2017 18	Terek Grozny	0 – 1	Ufa	Grozny
21:00 YEKT (UTC+5)		Summary	Sysuyev (yellow card) 20'; Paurević (yellow card) 45'; Igboun 79'	Stadium: Akhmat-Arena; Attendance: 17,753; Referee: Sergey Karasev

11 March 2017 19	Ufa	1 – 0	Krylia Sovetov	Ufa
13:30 YEKT (UTC+5)	Paurević 6'	Summary	Gadzhibekov (yellow card) 70'	Stadium: Neftyanik Stadium; Attendance: 6,200; Referee: Vladimir Seldyakov

19 March 2017 20	Krasnodar	0 – 0	Ufa	Krasnodar
18:30 YEKT (UTC+5)		Summary	Putsko (yellow card) 36'; Stotsky (yellow card) 42'; Alikin (yellow card) 79'	Stadium: Krasnodar Stadium; Attendance: 15,365; Referee: Kirill Levnikov

1 April 2017 21	Ufa	0 – 1	Lokomotiv Moscow	Ufa
17:00 YEKT (UTC+5)		Summary	Ignatyev (yellow card) 19'; Farfán 37'; Yanbayev (yellow card) 57'; Tarasov (yellow card) 62'	Stadium: Neftyanik Stadium; Attendance: 8,600; Referee: Roman Galimov

9 April 2017 22	Ufa	1 – 3	Spartak Moscow	Ufa
16:00 YEKT (UTC+5)	Vaněk (yellow card) 26'; Nikitin (yellow card) 55'; Oblyakov 85'; Stotsky (yellow card) 89'	Summary	Glushakov 38'; Promes 56' (pen.); Melgarejo 90+1'	Stadium: Neftyanik Stadium; Attendance: 12,300; Referee: Sergey Lapochkin

15 April 2017 23	Arsenal Tula	1 – 1	Ufa	Perm
14:00 YEKT (UTC+5)	Bodul 89'	Summary	Gol 35' (o.g.); Alikin (yellow card) 41'; Belenov (yellow card) 87'; Nikitin (yellow card) 90+2'	Stadium: Zvezda Stadium; Attendance: 5,200; Referee: Vladimir Moskalyov

21 April 2017 24	Ufa	0 – 2	CSKA Moscow	Ufa
19:00 YEKT (UTC+5)		Summary	Akinfeev (yellow card) 2'; Shchennikov (yellow card) 52'; Vitinho 65'; Chalov 90'; V.Berezutski (yellow card) 90'	Stadium: Neftyanik Stadium; Attendance: 8,150; Referee: Vladislav Bezborodov

25 April 2017 25	Rostov	1 – 0	Ufa	Rostov-on-Don
21:30 YEKT (UTC+5)	Poloz 23'	Summary	Bezdenezhnykh (yellow card) 21'; Carp (yellow card) 28'; Nikitin (yellow card) 53'	Stadium: Olimp-2; Attendance: 7,834; Referee: Alexey Nikolaev

30 April 2017 26	Ufa	1 – 0	Arsenal Tula	Ufa
16:30 YEKT (UTC+5)	Alikin (yellow card) 28'; Sukhov 90+3'	Summary	Vergara (yellow card) 88'	Stadium: Neftyanik Stadium; Attendance: 5,862; Referee: Evgeny Turbin

7 May 2017 27	Rubin Kazan	2 – 1	Ufa	Kazan
18:30 YEKT (UTC+5)	Caktaš 37' (pen.), 53'; Nabiullin (yellow card) 70'; M'Vila (yellow card) 80'; Kambolov (yellow card) 82'; Zhemaletdinov (yellow card) 87'	Summary	Stotsky 19' (yellow card) 77'; Sukhov (yellow card) 25'; Carp (yellow card) 37'; Zubarev (yellow card) 73'; Krotov (yellow card) 85'	Stadium: Kazan Arena; Attendance: 4,298; Referee: Vladimir Moskalyov

14 May 2017 28	Ufa	2 – 1	Anzhi Makhachkala	Ufa
18:30 YEKT (UTC+5)	Jokić (yellow card) 24'; Stotsky 39'; Fatai 90'	Report	Budkivskyi 41'	Stadium: Neftyanik Stadium; Attendance: 5,800; Referee: Evgeny Turbin

17 May 2017 29	Orenburg	1 – 1	Ufa	Orenburg
19:30 YEKT (UTC+5)	Malykh (yellow card) 67'; Afonin 90'	Report	Paurević (yellow card) 38'; Sukhov (yellow card) 89' (goal) 90+3'	Stadium: Gazovik Stadium; Attendance: 5,226; Referee: Aleksandr Egorov

21 May 2017 30	Ufa	1 – 0	Ural Yekaterinburg	Ufa
17:00 YEKT (UTC+5)	Fatai 38'	Report		Stadium: Neftyanik Stadium; Attendance: 5,200; Referee: Vladimir Seldyakov

==== League table ====
Pos	Team	Pld	W	D	L	GF	GA	GD	Pts	Qualification or relegation
5	Terek Grozny	30	14	6	10	38	35	+3	48	
6	Rostov	30	13	9	8	36	18	+18	48	
7	Ufa	30	12	7	11	22	25	−3	43	
8	Lokomotiv Moscow	30	10	12	8	39	27	+12	42	Qualification for the Europa League group stage (Note: Lokomotiv Moscow qualified for the Europa League group stage by winning the 2016–17 Russian Cup.)
9	Rubin Kazan	30	10	8	12	30	34	−4	38	

Source: Russian Premier League, Soccerway
Rules for classification: 1) Points; 2) Matches won; 3) Head-to-head points; 4) Head-to-head matches won; 5) Head-to-head goal difference; 6) Head-to-head goals scored; 7) Head-to-head away goals; 8) Goal difference; 9) Goals scored; 10) Away goals scored.

=== Russian Cup ===
21 September 2016 Round of 32	Energomash Belgorod	1 – 1 (a.e.t.) (3 – 5 p)	Ufa	Belgorod
21:00 YEKT (UTC+5)	Abdulavov 9' (o.g.); Samoylov (yellow card) 62'; Ageyev (yellow card) 98'; Samsonov (yellow card) 103'; Butyrin (yellow card) 113'	Summary	Marcinho 18' (pen.) (yellow card) 55'; Zubarev (yellow card) 22'; Safronidi (yellow card) 71'; Tumasyan (yellow card) 80'; Sysuyev (yellow card) 90+1'; Vaněk (yellow card) 114'	Stadium: Energomash Stadium; Attendance: 9,000; Referee: Lasha Verulidze
	Penalties
	Belobayev (penalty scored); Saplinov (penalty scored); Semeykin (penalty missed); Sergeyev (penalty scored)		(penalty scored) Krotov; (penalty scored) Sysuyev; (penalty scored) Diego Carlos; (penalty scored) Abdulavov; (penalty scored) Tumasyan

26 October 2016 Round of 16	Terek Grozny	1 – 1 (a.e.t.) (3 – 4 p)	Ufa	Grozny
21:00 YEKT (UTC+5)	Stotsky 53' (o.g.); Kuzyayev (yellow card) 55'; Utsiyev (yellow card) 63'; Semyonov (yellow card) 96'	Summary	Ángel 11' (o.g.); Zaseyev (yellow card) 66'; Nikitin (yellow card) 80'; Shelia (yellow card) 114'	Stadium: Akhmat-Arena; Attendance: 11,250; Referee: Artyom Chistyakov
	Penalties
	Balaj (penalty scored); Píriz (penalty missed); Semyonov (penalty missed); Rodolfo (penalty scored); Grozav (penalty scored)		(penalty scored) Fatai; (penalty scored) Igboun; (penalty scored) Marcinho; (penalty missed) Stotsky; (penalty scored) Zaseyev

1 March 2017 Quarterfinal	Ufa	1 – 0	Anzhi Makhachkala	Ufa
19:00 YEKT (UTC+5)	Zaseyev (yellow card) 55' (goal) 66'; Igboun (yellow card) 57'; Stotsky (yellow card) 85'; Paurević (yellow card) 89'	Summary	Yakovlev (yellow card) 32'; Guliyev (yellow card) 79'	Stadium: Neftyanik Stadium; Attendance: 8,400

5 April 2017 Semifinal	Lokomotiv Moscow	1 – 0	Ufa	Moscow
21:30 YEKT (UTC+5)	Fernandes 44'; Margasov (yellow card) 57'; Guilherme (yellow card) 90+2'	Summary	Vaněk (yellow card) 48'; Stotsky (yellow card) 51'; Alikin (yellow card) 53'; Jokić (yellow card) 88'; Paurević (yellow card) 90+2'	Stadium: Lokomotiv Stadium; Attendance: 9,851; Referee: Alexander Yegorov

== Squad statistics ==
As of Match played 21 May 2017

=== Appearances and goals ===
No.	Pos	Nat	Player	Total		Premier League		Russian Cup	
No.	Pos	Nat	Player	Apps	Goals	Apps	Goals	Apps	Goals
3	DF	(Russia) RUS	Pavel Alikin	31	0	26+1	0	3+1	0
4	DF	(Russia) RUS	Aleksei Nikitin	19	0	16	0	3	0
5	DF	(Slovenia) SLO	Bojan Jokić	12	0	9+2	0	1	0
7	MF	(Russia) RUS	Dmitri Sysuyev	20	1	11+5	1	4	0
9	MF	(Czech Republic) CZE	Ondřej Vaněk	19	2	12+4	2	2+1	0
13	MF	(Russia) RUS	Azamat Zaseyev	27	1	23+2	0	2	1
17	DF	(Russia) RUS	Dmitri Zhivoglyadov	24	0	19+1	0	4	0
19	MF	(Croatia) CRO	Ivan Paurević	15	1	13	1	2	0
20	DF	(Russia) RUS	Denis Tumasyan	8	0	7	0	1	0
21	FW	(Nigeria) NGR	Kehinde Fatai	24	6	15+7	6	1+1	0
31	GK	(Russia) RUS	Aleksandr Belenov	11	0	10	0	1	0
33	DF	(Russia) RUS	Aleksandr Sukhov	27	3	23+2	3	1+1	0
39	MF	(Russia) RUS	Dmitry Stotsky	32	3	29	3	3	0
44	MF	(Nigeria) NGR	Sylvester Igboun	26	3	22+2	3	2	0
45	DF	(Russia) RUS	Aleksandr Putsko	7	0	4+1	0	1+1	0
57	FW	(Russia) RUS	Vyacheslav Krotov	27	0	7+17	0	0+3	0
60	MF	(Russia) RUS	Vladimir Zubarev	11	0	0+9	0	1+1	0
70	MF	(Russia) RUS	Nikolai Safronidi	3	0	0+2	0	1	0
77	MF	(Russia) RUS	Andrei Batyutin	3	0	0+1	0	2	0
87	MF	(Russia) RUS	Igor Bezdenezhnykh	21	0	18+2	0	0+1	0
88	GK	(Russia) RUS	Giorgi Shelia	13	0	11	0	2	0
93	DF	(Moldova) MDA	Cătălin Carp	11	0	8+1	0	2	0
98	MF	(Russia) RUS	Ivan Oblyakov	22	1	14+6	1	1+1	0
99	FW	(Russia) RUS	Islamnur Abdulavov	14	0	4+9	0	1	0
Players away from the club on loan:
Players who left Ufa during the season:
5	DF	(Russia) RUS	Viktor Vasin	17	0	17	0	0	0
10	MF	(Brazil) BRA	Marcinho	13	1	1+10	0	1+1	1
11	MF	(Brazil) BRA	Diego Carlos	5	0	0+4	0	1	0
71	GK	(Russia) RUS	Andrey Lunyov	11	0	9+1	0	1	0

=== Goal scorers ===
Place	Position	Nation	Number	Name	Premier League	Russian Cup	Total
1	FW	(Nigeria)	21	Kehinde Fatai	6	0	6
2	MF	(Nigeria)	44	Sylvester Igboun	3	0	3
2	MF	(Russia)	39	Dmitry Stotsky	3	0	3
2	DF	(Russia)	33	Aleksandr Sukhov	3	0	3
2				Own goal	2	1	3
6	MF	(Czech Republic)	9	Ondřej Vaněk	2	0	2
7	MF	(Russia)	7	Dmitri Sysuyev	1	0	1
7	MF	(Croatia)	19	Ivan Paurević	1	0	1
7	MF	(Croatia)	98	Ivan Oblyakov	1	0	1
7	MF	(Brazil)	10	Marcinho	0	1	1
7	MF	(Russia)	13	Azamat Zaseyev	0	1	1
				TOTALS	22	3	25

=== Disciplinary record ===
Number	Nation	Position	Name	Premier League		Russian Cup		Total	
Number	Nation	Position	Name	Yellow card	Red card	Yellow card	Red card	Yellow card	Red card
3	(Russia)	DF	Pavel Alikin	8	1	1	0	9	1
4	(Russia)	DF	Aleksei Nikitin	5	0	1	0	6	0
5	(Russia)	DF	Viktor Vasin	1	0	1	0	2	0
5	(Slovenia)	DF	Bojan Jokić	1	0	0	0	1	0
7	(Russia)	MF	Dmitri Sysuyev	4	0	1	0	5	0
9	(Czech Republic)	MF	Ondřej Vaněk	3	0	2	0	5	0
10	(Brazil)	MF	Marcinho	1	0	1	0	2	0
13	(Russia)	MF	Azamat Zaseyev	4	1	2	0	6	1
19	(Croatia)	MF	Ivan Paurević	2	0	2	0	4	0
20	(Russia)	DF	Denis Tumasyan	0	0	1	0	1	0
21	(Nigeria)	FW	Kehinde Fatai	2	0	0	0	2	0
31	(Russia)	GK	Aleksandr Belenov	1	0	0	0	1	0
33	(Russia)	DF	Aleksandr Sukhov	3	0	0	0	3	0
39	(Russia)	MF	Dmitry Stotsky	7	0	2	0	9	0
44	(Nigeria)	MF	Sylvester Igboun	4	0	1	0	5	0
45	(Russia)	DF	Aleksandr Putsko	1	0	0	0	1	0
57	(Russia)	FW	Vyacheslav Krotov	4	0	0	0	4	0
60	(Russia)	MF	Vladimir Zubarev	2	0	1	0	3	0
70	(Russia)	MF	Nikolai Safronidi	0	0	1	0	1	0
87	(Russia)	MF	Igor Bezdenezhnykh	8	0	0	0	8	0
88	(Russia)	GK	Giorgi Shelia	1	1	1	0	2	1
93	(Moldova)	DF	Cătălin Carp	2	0	0	0	2	0
98	(Russia)	MF	Ivan Oblyakov	3	0	0	0	3	0
			TOTALS	67	3	18	0	85	3
