= 2017–18 FC Ufa season =

FC Ufa
2017–18 season
- Chairman: Marat Magadeyev
- Manager: Sergei Semak
- Stadium: Neftyanik Stadium
- Russian Premier League: 6th
- Russian Cup: Round of 32 vs Olimpiyets Nizhny Novgorod
- Top goalscorer: League: Sylvester Igboun (7); All: Sylvester Igboun (7)
Home colours	Away colours

The 2017–18 FC Ufa season was the fourth successive season in the Russian Premier League, the highest tier of association football in Russia, and fifth in total. Ufa finished the season in sixth place, qualifying for UEFA Europa League for the first time due to Tosno failing to obtain a UEFA licence after their Russian Cup victory. This meant that Krasnodar, the fourth-placed team in the Russian Premier League, entered the group stage instead of the third qualifying round, fifth-placed Zenit St.Petersburg, entered the third qualifying round instead of the second qualifying round, and sixth-placed Ufa taking the second qualifying round berth. Ufa were knocked out of the Russian Cup at the Round of 32 by Olimpiyets Nizhny Novgorod.

== Squad ==
As of 28 February 2018

Note: Flags indicate national team as defined under FIFA eligibility rules; some limited exceptions apply. Players may hold more than one non-FIFA nationality.

No.	Pos.	Nation	Player
3	DF	RUS	Pavel Alikin
4	DF	RUS	Aleksei Nikitin
5	DF	SLO	Bojan Jokić
6	MF	SUI	Vero Salatić
7	MF	RUS	Dmitri Sysuyev
9	MF	CZE	Ondřej Vaněk
10	FW	KAZ	Yerkebulan Seidakhmet
13	MF	RUS	Azamat Zaseyev
17	DF	RUS	Dmitri Zhivoglyadov
19	MF	CRO	Ivan Paurević
20	DF	RUS	Denis Tumasyan
21	FW	NGR	Kehinde Fatai

No.	Pos.	Nation	Player
22	DF	MDA	Victor Patrașco
27	DF	ROU	Ionuț Nedelcearu
31	GK	RUS	Aleksandr Belenov
33	DF	RUS	Aleksandr Sukhov
39	MF	RUS	Dmitry Stotsky
44	FW	NGR	Sylvester Igboun
55	DF	GEO	Jemal Tabidze
57	FW	RUS	Vyacheslav Krotov
70	MF	RUS	Nikolai Safronidi
88	GK	RUS	Giorgi Shelia
93	DF	MDA	Cătălin Carp
98	MF	RUS	Ivan Oblyakov

=== Out on loan ===
Note: Flags indicate national team as defined under FIFA eligibility rules; some limited exceptions apply. Players may hold more than one non-FIFA nationality.

No.	Pos.	Nation	Player
60	MF	RUS	Vladimir Zubarev (at Khimki)
87	MF	RUS	Igor Bezdenezhnykh (at Olimpiyets Nizhny Novgorod)
99	FW	RUS	Islamnur Abdulavov (at Tom Tomsk)

== Transfers ==
=== Summer ===
In: Note: Flags indicate national team as defined under FIFA eligibility rules; some limited exceptions apply. Players may hold more than one non-FIFA nationality.

No.	Pos.	Nation	Player
1	GK	RUS	Aleksei Chernov (from (Russia) Kaluga)
6	MF	SUI	Vero Salatić (from (Switzerland) Sion)
55	DF	GEO	Jemal Tabidze (from (Belgium) Gent)
80	MF	RUS	Arseni Zdorovets

Out: Note: Flags indicate national team as defined under FIFA eligibility rules; some limited exceptions apply. Players may hold more than one non-FIFA nationality.

No.	Pos.	Nation	Player
1	GK	RUS	Mikhail Borodko (to (Russia) Olimpiyets Nizhny Novgorod)
2	DF	UKR	Oleksandr Filin (to (Russia) Olimpiyets Nizhny Novgorod)
45	DF	RUS	Aleksandr Putsko (on loan to (Russia) SKA-Khabarovsk)
56	GK	RUS	Igor Ozhiganov
96	FW	RUS	Nikita Tikhonov
—	MF	RUS	Andrei Batyutin (on loan to (Russia) Dynamo St. Petersburg, previously on loan to (Russia) Zenit-2 St. Petersburg)
—	MF	RUS	Maksim Semakin (to (Russia) Yenisey Krasnoyarsk, previously on loan)

=== Winter ===
In: Note: Flags indicate national team as defined under FIFA eligibility rules; some limited exceptions apply. Players may hold more than one non-FIFA nationality.

No.	Pos.	Nation	Player
10	FW	KAZ	Yerkebulan Seidakhmet (from (Kazakhstan) Taraz)
27	DF	ROU	Ionuț Nedelcearu (from (Romania) Dinamo București)
52	GK	RUS	Rem Saitgareyev

Out: Note: Flags indicate national team as defined under FIFA eligibility rules; some limited exceptions apply. Players may hold more than one non-FIFA nationality.

No.	Pos.	Nation	Player
53	GK	RUS	Gleb Yefimov (to (Russia) Zorky Krasnogorsk)
60	MF	RUS	Vladimir Zubarev (on loan to (Russia) Khimki)
87	MF	RUS	Igor Bezdenezhnykh (on loan to (Russia) Olimpiyets Nizhny Novgorod)
99	FW	RUS	Islamnur Abdulavov (on loan to (Russia) Tom Tomsk)

== Competitions ==
=== Russian Premier League ===
==== Results by round ====
Round	1	2	3	4	5	6	7	8	9	10	11	12	13	14	15	16	17	18	19	20	21	22	23	24	25	26	27	28	29	30
Ground	A	H	A	H	A	H	A	A	H	A	H	A	H	A	H	A	H	A	H	A	H	H	A	H	A	H	A	H	A	H
Result	W	D	D	W	D	L	D	L	L	L	W	D	W	D	W	L	W	L	W	L	D	W	W	L	L	D	D	W	D	W
Position	4	6	6	4	7	7	7	8	9	11	10	12	7	8	7	8	6	7	6	6	6	6	6	6	7	6	6	6	6	6

Updated to match(es) played on 13 May 2018. Source: See Results
A = Away; H = Home; W = Win; D = Draw; L = Loss

==== Results ====
15 July 2017 1	Tosno	0 – 1	Ufa	Saint Petersburg
19:30 YEKT (UTC+5)	Dugalić (yellow card) 81'	Report	Sysuyev 65'; Alikin (yellow card) 79'; Zhivoglyadov (yellow card) 83'	Stadium: Petrovsky Stadium; Attendance: 4,053; Referee: Vladimir Moskalyov

23 July 2017 2	Ufa	0 – 0	Lokomotiv Moscow	Ufa
15:00 YEKT (UTC+5)	Tabidze (yellow card) 80'	Report	Kombarov (yellow card) 77'	Stadium: Neftyanik Stadium; Attendance: 12,571; Referee: Aleksey Sukhoy

29 July 2017 3	Ural Yekaterinburg	1 – 1	Ufa	Yekaterinburg
17:00 YEKT (UTC+5)	Haroyan (yellow card) 47'; Yemelyanov (yellow card) 79'; Tabidze 88' (o.g.)	Report	Tumasyan (yellow card) 7'; Igboun 17'	Stadium: SKB-Bank Arena; Attendance: 6,280; Referee: Sergei Karasev

5 August 2017 4	Ufa	3 – 2	Akhmat Grozny	Ufa
17:00 YEKT (UTC+5)	Igboun (yellow card) 53'; Stotsky (yellow card) 77'; Jokić 80'; Alikin 84'; Sysuyev 86'	Report	Jabá 48'; Ángel (yellow card) 53' (goal) 90+3'; Pliyev (yellow card) 82'	Stadium: Neftyanik Stadium; Attendance: 5,102; Referee: Vladimir Seldyakov

8 August 2017 5	Amkar Perm	0 – 0	Ufa	Perm
19:30 YEKT (UTC+5)	Miljković (yellow card) 25'; Zanev (yellow card) 52'	Report	Jokić (yellow card) 78'; Alikin (yellow card) 89'	Stadium: Zvezda Stadium; Attendance: 4,900; Referee: Igor Fedotov

12 August 2017 6	Ufa	1 – 4	Rostov	Ufa
17:00 YEKT (UTC+5)	Stotsky (yellow card) 47'; Bezdenezhnykh (yellow card) 51'; Vaněk 55'	Report	Gațcan 57'; Kalachev 64' (pen.), 66'; Mevlja 77'	Stadium: Neftyanik Stadium; Attendance: 5,626; Referee: Aleksei Matyunin

20 August 2017 7	Dynamo Moscow	1 – 1	Ufa	Moscow
19:30 YEKT (UTC+5)	Zotov 87'	Report	Vaněk 45'; Oblyakov (yellow card) 71'; Paurević (yellow card) 76'; Jokić (yellow card) 90+1'	Stadium: Arena Khimki; Attendance: 6,179; Referee: Vladislav Bezborodov

25 August 2017 8	Anzhi Makhachkala	1 – 0	Ufa	Kaspiysk
22:00 YEKT (UTC+5)	Lescano 18' (yellow card) 90+3'; Markelov (yellow card) 51'	Report	Jokić (yellow card) 45+1'; Sysuyev (yellow card) 69'	Stadium: Anzhi Arena; Attendance: 4,100; Referee: Aleksei Nikolaev

10 September 2017 9	Ufa	0 – 1	Krasnodar	Ufa
18:30 YEKT (UTC+5)	Zaseyev (yellow card) 62'	Report	Shishkin (yellow card) 40'; Smolov 75'	Stadium: Neftyanik Stadium; Attendance: 5,158; Referee: Sergei Karasev

18 September 2017 10	Zenit St.Petersburg	3 – 0	Ufa	Saint Petersburg
22:00 YEKT (UTC+5)	Driussi 9'; Criscito 22' (pen.); Kokorin 77'	Report	Paurević (yellow card) 83'; Igboun (yellow card) 90+1'	Stadium: Krestovsky Stadium; Attendance: 30,158; Referee: Roman Galimov

24 September 2017 11	Ufa	1 – 0	Arsenal Tula	Ufa
18:30 YEKT (UTC+5)	Tumasyan (yellow card) 34'; Igboun 77'; Sysuyev (yellow card) 82'; Belenov (yellow card) 90+1'; Stotsky (yellow card) 90+1'	Report	Shevchenko (yellow card) 42'	Stadium: Neftyanik Stadium; Attendance: 3,827; Referee: Vladislav Bezborodov

1 October 2017 12	CSKA Moscow	0 – 0	Ufa	Moscow
16:00 YEKT (UTC+5)		Report		Stadium: VEB Arena; Attendance: 10,127; Referee: Sergey Lapochkin

15 October 2017 13	Ufa	1 – 0	Lokomotiv Moscow	Ufa
16:00 YEKT (UTC+5)	Igboun (yellow card) 70' (goal) 76'; Tumasyan (yellow card) 74'	Report	Denisov (yellow card) 78'	Stadium: Neftyanik Stadium; Attendance: 6,123; Referee: Aleksey Sukhoy

21 October 2017 14	SKA-Khabarovsk	2 – 2	Ufa	Khabarovsk
13:30 YEKT (UTC+5)	Dimidko 11'; Dedechko 39'; Navalovski (yellow card) 64'; Savichev (yellow card) 89'	Report	Alikin (yellow card) 30'; Tumasyan (yellow card) 44'; Krotov 54', 72'; Jokić (yellow card) 56'	Stadium: Lenin Stadium; Attendance: 5,399; Referee: Sergey Kulikov

30 October 2017 15	Ufa	2 – 1	Rubin Kazan	Ufa
19:00 YEKT (UTC+5)	Stotsky 36'; Salatić (yellow card) 42'; Vaněk (yellow card) 67' (goal) 89'; Abdulavov (yellow card) 74'; Zhivoglyadov (yellow card) 82'	Report	Karadeniz 3'; Bauer (yellow card) 88'	Stadium: Neftyanik Stadium; Attendance: 4,612; Referee: Sergey Ivanov

5 November 2017 16	Spartak Moscow	3 – 1	Ufa	Moscow
21:00 YEKT (UTC+5)	Fernando 37'; Luiz Adriano (yellow card) 51' (goal) 79'; Promes 63'	Report	Igboun 10' (yellow card) 51'; Paurević (yellow card) 47'	Stadium: Otkrytiye Arena; Attendance: 21,445; Referee: Artem Chistyakov

19 November 2017 17	Ufa	2 – 0	Ural Yekaterinburg	Ufa
13:30 YEKT (UTC+5)	Stotsky 28'; Sysuyev (yellow card) 30'; Krotov 58'; Zhivoglyadov (yellow card) 73'; Nikitin (yellow card) 86'	Report	Balažic (yellow card) 27'; Bicfalvi (penalty missed) 87'	Stadium: Neftyanik Stadium; Attendance: 6,309; Referee: Pavel Kukuyan

25 November 2017 18	Akhmat Grozny	2 – 1	Ufa	Grozny
21:00 YEKT (UTC+5)	Sampaio 45'; Léo Jabá 53'; Pliyev (yellow card) 86'; Rodolfo (yellow card) 90'	Report	Salatić (yellow card) 7'; Sysuyev (yellow card) 36'; Zhivoglyadov (yellow card) 44'; Oblyakov 87'	Stadium: Akhmat-Arena; Attendance: 11,318; Referee: Aleksey Eskov

3 December 2017 19	Ufa	3 – 0	Amkar Perm	Ufa
15:00 YEKT (UTC+5)	Igboun 53', 69'; Jokić (yellow card) 63'; Oblyakov 80'; Nikitin (yellow card) 85'; Safronidi (yellow card) 90+3'	Report		Stadium: Neftyanik Stadium; Attendance: 5,924; Referee: Vladimir Seldyakov

10 December 2017 20	Rostov	1 – 0	Ufa	Rostov-on-Don
21:00 YEKT (UTC+5)	Ingason 22'; Pesyakov (yellow card) 90+3'	Report	Salatić (yellow card) 73'; Igboun (yellow card) 90+1'	Stadium: Olimp-2; Attendance: 7,834; Referee: Vladimir Moskalyov

4 March 2018 21	Ufa	1 – 1	Dynamo Moscow	Ufa
16:00 YEKT (UTC+5)	Nedelcearu (yellow card) 46'; Paurević 51'	Report	Markov 17' (pen.); Sow (yellow card) 70'	Stadium: Neftyanik Stadium; Attendance: 6,178; Referee: Sergey Lapochkin

10 March 2018 22	Ufa	3 – 2	Anzhi Makhachkala	Ufa
16:00 YEKT (UTC+5)	Jokić (yellow card) 45+1' (goal) 67'; Nikitin 57'; Paurević 65'; Seidakhmet (yellow card) 83'; Belenov (yellow card) 90+1'	Report	Anton (yellow card) 56'; Lescano 64'; Poluyakhtov 81'; Samardžić (yellow card) 83'	Stadium: Neftyanik Stadium; Attendance: 5,386; Referee: Vladislav Bezborodov

17 March 2018 23	Krasnodar	0 – 1	Ufa	Krasnodar
18:30 YEKT (UTC+5)	Laborde (yellow card) 83'	Report	Zhivoglyadov (yellow card) 56'; Fatai (yellow card) 69'; Paurević 72'; Oblyakov (yellow card) 83'	Stadium: Krasnodar Stadium; Attendance: 20,626; Referee: Vladimir Moskalyov

1 April 2018 24	Ufa	1 – 2	Zenit St.Petersburg	Ufa
18:00 YEKT (UTC+5)	Paurević 63'; Oblyakov (yellow card) 90+3'	Report	Ivanović 17'; Nedelcearu 21' (o.g.); Criscito (yellow card) 90+4'	Stadium: Neftyanik Stadium; Attendance: 8,524; Referee: Igor Fedotov

7 April 2018 25	Arsenal Tula	2 – 1	Ufa	Tula
21:00 YEKT (UTC+5)	Gorbatenko 2', 72'; Belyayev (yellow card) 40'	Report	Sysuyev (yellow card) 5'; Stotsky 16'; Salatić (yellow card) 56'; Jokić (yellow card) 64'	Stadium: Arsenal Stadium; Attendance: 10,250; Referee: Kirill Levnikov

15 April 2018 26	Ufa	1 – 1	CSKA Moscow	Ufa
18:30 YEKT (UTC+5)	Sysuyev 41'; Zhivoglyadov (yellow card) 77'	Report	Golovin (yellow card) 35'; Musa 87'	Stadium: Neftyanik Stadium; Attendance: 11,408; Referee: Evgeni Turbin

22 April 2018 27	Lokomotiv Moscow	0 – 0	Ufa	Moscow
21:00 YEKT (UTC+5)	Ćorluka (yellow card) 52'; Guilherme (yellow card) 77'	Report	Nedelcearu (yellow card) 21'; Igboun (yellow card) 35'; Carp (yellow card) 43'; Belenov (yellow card) 90'	Stadium: RZD Arena; Attendance: 10,821; Referee: Roman Galimov

30 April 2018 28	Ufa	1 – 0	SKA-Khabarovsk	Ufa
13:30 YEKT (UTC+5)	Sysuyev 3'	Report	Hryshko (yellow card) 15'; Adeleye (yellow card) 36'; Samsonov (yellow card) 75'	Stadium: Neftyanik Stadium; Attendance: 6,262; Referee: Vladislav Bezborodov

7 May 2018 29	Rubin Kazan	0 – 0	Ufa	Kazan
19:30 YEKT (UTC+5)	Kuzmin (yellow card) 54'; Kudryashov (yellow card) 57'	Report	Stotsky (yellow card) 61'	Stadium: Kazan Arena; Attendance: 25,440; Referee: Aleksei Matyunin

13 May 2018 30	Ufa	5 – 0	Tosno	Ufa
16:00 YEKT (UTC+5)	Zhivoglyadov 30', 84' (yellow card) 85'; Sysuyev 32'; Igboun 50'; Tumasyan (yellow card) 52'; Paurević 81'; Safronidi (yellow card) 88'	Report	Nuno Rocha (yellow card) 29'; Skvortsov (yellow card) 47'	Stadium: Neftyanik Stadium; Attendance: 10,632; Referee: Vitali Meshkov

==== League table ====
Pos	Team	Pld	W	D	L	GF	GA	GD	Pts	Qualification or relegation
4	Krasnodar	30	16	6	8	46	30	+16	54	Qualification for the Europa League group stage (Note: Tosno qualified for the Europa League group stage by winning the 2017–18 Russian Cup. However, since they failed to obtain a UEFA licence, the spot awarded to the cup winners was passed to fourth-placed team, the spot awarded to the fourth-placed team was passed to fifth-placed team, and the spot awarded to the fifth-placed team was passed to sixth-placed team.)
5	Zenit Saint Petersburg	30	14	11	5	46	21	+25	53	Qualification for the Europa League third qualifying round
6	Ufa	30	11	10	9	34	30	+4	43	Qualification for the Europa League second qualifying round
7	Arsenal Tula	30	12	6	12	35	41	−6	42	
8	Dynamo Moscow	30	10	10	10	29	30	−1	40	

Updated to match(es) played on 13 May 2018. Source: Russian Premier League, Soccerway
Rules for classification: 1) Points; 2) Head-to-head points; 3) Head-to-head matches won; 4) Head-to-head goal difference; 5) Head-to-head goals scored; 6) Head-to-head away goals; 7) Matches won; 8) Goal difference; 9) Goals scored; 10) Away goals scored.

=== Russian Cup ===
21 September 2017 Round of 32	Olimpiyets Nizhny Novgorod	1 – 1 (a.e.t.) (4 – 1 p)	Ufa	Nizhny Novgorod
20:00 YEKY (UTC+5)	Shcherbak (yellow card) 41'; Malyarov 57'; Fomin (yellow card) 88'; Khripkov (yellow card) 90'; Belyakov (yellow card) 90+1'; Frolov (yellow card) 90+3'; Gogberashvili (yellow card) 90+3'	Report	Abdulavov 90+2'	Stadium: Lokomotiv Stadium; Attendance: 1,500; Referee: Lasha Verulidze
	Penalties
	Belyakov (penalty scored); Fomin (penalty scored); Ayupov (penalty scored); Anisimov (penalty scored)		Tumasyan (penalty missed); Salatić (penalty missed); Oblyakov (penalty scored)

== Squad statistics ==
As of Match played 13 May 2018

=== Appearances and goals ===
No.	Pos	Nat	Player	Total		Premier League		Russian Cup	
No.	Pos	Nat	Player	Apps	Goals	Apps	Goals	Apps	Goals
3	DF	(Russia) RUS	Pavel Alikin	28	1	23+5	1	0	0
4	DF	(Russia) RUS	Aleksei Nikitin	19	1	16+2	1	1	0
5	DF	(Slovenia) SLO	Bojan Jokić	26	2	26	2	0	0
6	MF	(Switzerland) SUI	Vero Salatić	19	0	15+3	0	1	0
7	MF	(Russia) RUS	Dmitri Sysuyev	27	5	16+10	5	1	0
8	DF	(Moldova) MDA	Cătălin Carp	11	0	5+5	0	1	0
9	MF	(Czech Republic) CZE	Ondřej Vaněk	11	3	9+2	3	0	0
10	FW	(Kazakhstan) KAZ	Yerkebulan Seidakhmet	2	0	0+2	0	0	0
13	MF	(Russia) RUS	Azamat Zaseyev	18	0	9+9	0	0	0
17	DF	(Russia) RUS	Dmitri Zhivoglyadov	28	2	26+2	2	0	0
19	MF	(Croatia) CRO	Ivan Paurević	28	5	28	5	0	0
20	DF	(Russia) RUS	Denis Tumasyan	17	0	14+2	0	1	0
21	FW	(Nigeria) NGR	Kehinde Fatai	17	0	11+6	0	0	0
27	DF	(Romania) ROU	Ionuț Nedelcearu	10	0	10	0	0	0
31	GK	(Russia) RUS	Aleksandr Belenov	30	0	30	0	0	0
33	DF	(Russia) RUS	Aleksandr Sukhov	11	0	8+2	0	1	0
39	MF	(Russia) RUS	Dmitry Stotsky	29	3	27+1	3	0+1	0
44	FW	(Nigeria) NGR	Sylvester Igboun	26	7	24+2	7	0	0
55	DF	(Georgia (country)) GEO	Jemal Tabidze	21	0	18+2	0	0+1	0
57	FW	(Russia) RUS	Vyacheslav Krotov	16	3	4+11	3	1	0
60	MF	(Russia) RUS	Vladimir Zubarev	3	0	1+1	0	1	0
70	MF	(Russia) RUS	Nikolai Safronidi	3	0	0+2	0	1	0
87	MF	(Russia) RUS	Igor Bezdenezhnykh	3	0	0+3	0	0	0
88	GK	(Russia) RUS	Giorgi Shelia	1	0	0	0	1	0
98	MF	(Russia) RUS	Ivan Oblyakov	20	2	9+11	2	0	0
99	FW	(Russia) RUS	Islamnur Abdulavov	8	1	1+6	0	1	1
Players away from the club on loan:
Players who appeared for Ufa no longer at the club:

=== Goal scorers ===
Place	Position	Nation	Number	Name	Russian Premier League	Russian Cup	Total
1	FW	(Nigeria)	44	Sylvester Igboun	7	0	7
2	MF	(Croatia)	19	Ivan Paurević	5	0	5
2	FW	(Russia)	7	Dmitri Sysuyev	5	0	5
4	FW	(Czech Republic)	9	Ondřej Vaněk	3	0	3
4	FW	(Russia)	57	Vyacheslav Krotov	3	0	3
4	MF	(Russia)	39	Dmitry Stotsky	3	0	3
7	MF	(Russia)	98	Ivan Oblyakov	2	0	2
7	DF	(Slovenia)	5	Bojan Jokić	2	0	2
7	DF	(Russia)	17	Dmitri Zhivoglyadov	2	0	2
10	DF	(Russia)	3	Pavel Alikin	1	0	1
10	DF	(Russia)	4	Aleksei Nikitin	1	0	1
10	FW	(Russia)	99	Islamnur Abdulavov	0	1	1
				TOTALS	33	1	34

=== Disciplinary record ===
Number	Nation	Position	Name	Russian Premier League		Russian Cup		Total	
Number	Nation	Position	Name	Yellow card	Red card	Yellow card	Red card	Yellow card	Red card
3	(Russia)	DF	Pavel Alikin	3	0	0	0	3	0
4	(Russia)	DF	Aleksei Nikitin	2	0	0	0	2	0
5	(Slovenia)	DF	Bojan Jokić	7	0	0	0	7	0
6	(Switzerland)	MF	Vero Salatić	4	0	0	0	4	0
7	(Russia)	MF	Dmitri Sysuyev	5	0	0	0	5	0
8	(Moldova)	DF	Cătălin Carp	1	0	0	0	1	0
9	(Czech Republic)	MF	Ondřej Vaněk	1	0	0	0	1	0
10	(Kazakhstan)	FW	Yerkebulan Seidakhmet	1	0	0	0	1	0
13	(Russia)	MF	Azamat Zaseyev	1	0	0	0	1	0
17	(Russia)	DF	Dmitri Zhivoglyadov	7	0	0	0	7	0
19	(Croatia)	MF	Ivan Paurević	3	0	0	0	3	0
20	(Russia)	DF	Denis Tumasyan	5	0	0	0	5	0
21	(Nigeria)	FW	Kehinde Fatai	1	0	0	0	1	0
27	(Romania)	DF	Ionuț Nedelcearu	2	0	0	0	2	0
31	(Russia)	GK	Aleksandr Belenov	3	0	0	0	3	0
39	(Russia)	MF	Dmitry Stotsky	4	0	0	0	4	0
44	(Nigeria)	FW	Sylvester Igboun	6	0	0	0	6	0
55	(Georgia (country))	DF	Jemal Tabidze	1	0	0	0	1	0
70	(Russia)	MF	Nikolai Safronidi	2	0	0	0	2	0
87	(Russia)	MF	Igor Bezdenezhnykh	1	0	0	0	1	0
98	(Russia)	MF	Ivan Oblyakov	3	0	0	0	3	0
99	(Russia)	FW	Islamnur Abdulavov	1	0	0	0	1	0
			TOTALS	64	0	0	0	64	0
