= Aleksei Nikitin =

Russian footballer

Aleksei Nikitin Алексей Никитин
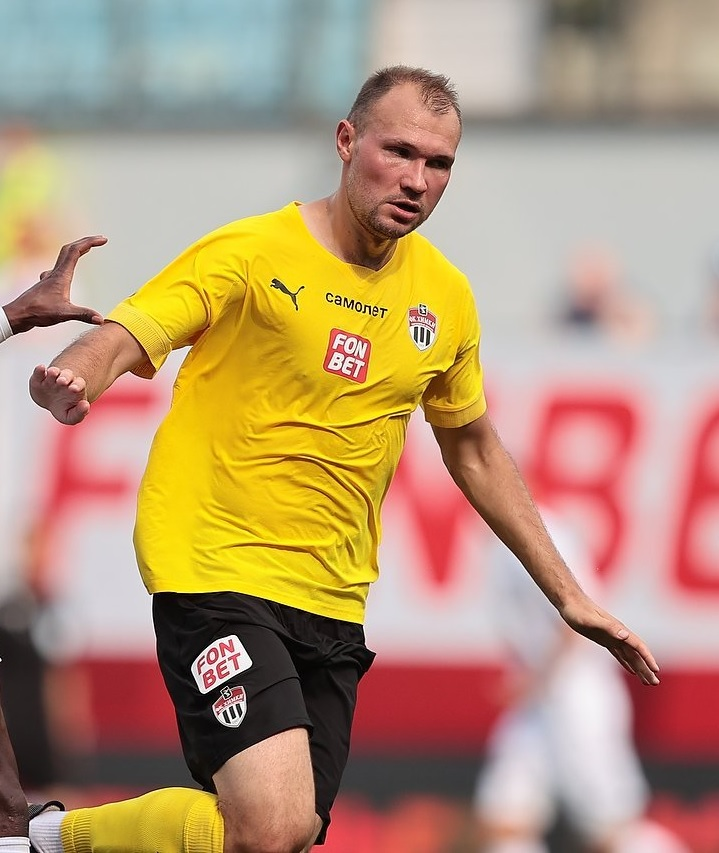
- Nikitin with Khimki in 2022

Personal information
- Full name: Aleksei Valeryevich Nikitin
- Date of birth: 27 January 1992 (age 34)
- Place of birth: Moscow, Russia
- Height: 1.89 m (6 ft 2 in)
- Position: Centre-back

Youth career
- –2012: CSKA Moscow

Senior career*
Years	Team	Apps	(Gls)
2012	CSKA Moscow	0	(0)
2012	→ Yenisey Krasnoyarsk (loan)	5	(0)
2012–2013	Yenisey Krasnoyarsk	28	(0)
2014–2015	Amkar Perm	17	(0)
2015–2022	Ufa	119	(4)
2022–2023	Khimki	9	(0)
2023	Tuzla City	6	(1)
2023–2024	Rotor Volgograd	35	(4)

International career^{‡}
2009	Russia U-17	15	(2)
2011	Russia U-19	7	(0)
2012–2014	Russia U-21	20	(2)
- * Club domestic league appearances and goals as of 1 December 2024 ‡ National team caps and goals as of 10 July 2015

Aleksei Valeryevich Nikitin (Russian: Алексей Валерьевич Никитин; born 27 January 1992) is a Russian football centre-back.

== Club career ==
He made his debut in the Russian Football National League for FC Yenisey Krasnoyarsk on 7 April 2012 in a game against FC SKA-Energiya Khabarovsk. He signed with FC Ufa in 2015.

On 18 June 2022, Nikitin moved to FC Khimki.

On 17 February 2023, Nikitin signed with Tuzla City in Bosnia and Herzegovina until the end of the season.

== Career statistics ==
As of 27 November 2022

Club	Season	League			Cup		Continental		Other		Total	
Club	Season	Division	Apps	Goals	Apps	Goals	Apps	Goals	Apps	Goals	Apps	Goals
Yenisey Krasnoyarsk	2011–12	FNL	5	0	–		–		–		5	0
Yenisey Krasnoyarsk	2012–13	FNL	18	0	3	1	–		–		21	1
Yenisey Krasnoyarsk	2013–14	FNL	10	0	0	0	–		–		10	0
Yenisey Krasnoyarsk	Total		33	0	3	1	0	0	0	0	36	1
Amkar Perm	2013–14	RPL	7	0	–		–		–		7	0
Amkar Perm	2014–15	RPL	10	0	–		–		–		10	0
Amkar Perm	Total		17	0	0	0	0	0	0	0	17	0
Ufa	2015–16	RPL	21	1	2	0	–		–		23	1
Ufa	2016–17	RPL	16	0	3	0	–		–		19	0
Ufa	2017–18	RPL	18	1	1	0	–		–		19	1
Ufa	2018–19	RPL	10	0	1	0	0	0	2 (Note: Appearances in the relegation play-offs)	0	13	0
Ufa	2019–20	RPL	8	0	1	0	–		–		9	0
Ufa	2020–21	RPL	23	0	3	0	–		–		26	0
Ufa	2021–22	RPL	23	2	2	1	–		2	0	27	3
Ufa	Total		119	4	13	1	0	0	4	0	136	5
Khimki	2022–23	RPL	9	0	3	0	–		–		12	0
Career total			178	4	19	2	0	0	4	0	201	6
