= Aleksandr Sukhov =

Russian footballer

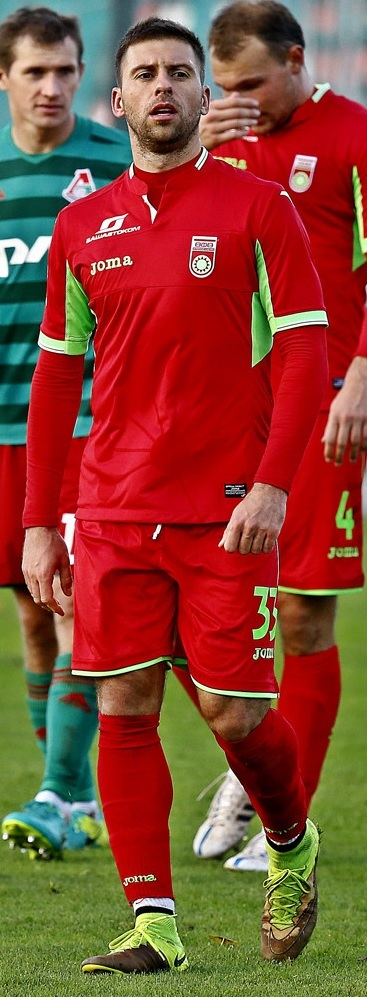
- Sukhov with FC Ufa in 2016

Personal information
- Full name: Aleksandr Aleksandrovich Sukhov
- Date of birth: 3 January 1986 (age 40)
- Place of birth: Moscow, Russian SFSR
- Height: 1.74 m (5 ft 9 in)
- Position: Right-back

Youth career
- –2007: FC Moscow

Senior career*
Years	Team	Apps	(Gls)
2005–2007	FC Moscow	1	(0)
2008	Tornado Moscow		
2009–2013	Shinnik Yaroslavl	113	(3)
2013–2023	FC Ufa	193	(3)
- * Club domestic league appearances and goals

Aleksandr Aleksandrovich Sukhov (Russian: Александр Александрович Сухов; born 3 January 1986) is a Russian former professional footballer.

== Club career ==
He made his debut in the Russian Premier League in 2006 for FC Moscow.

== Honours ==
- Russian Cup finalist: 2007.

== Career statistics ==
As of 28 May 2022

Club	Season	League			Cup		Continental		Other		Total	
Club	Season	Division	Apps	Goals	Apps	Goals	Apps	Goals	Apps	Goals	Apps	Goals
Moscow	2005	RPL	0	0	1	0	–		–		1	0
Moscow	2006	RPL	1	0	1	0	–		–		2	0
Moscow	2007	RPL	0	0	0	0	–		–		0	0
Moscow	Total		1	0	2	0	0	0	0	0	3	0
Shinnik Yaroslavl	2009	FNL	7	0	1	0	–		–		8	0
Shinnik Yaroslavl	2010	FNL	37	0	2	0	–		–		39	0
Shinnik Yaroslavl	2011–12	FNL	42	3	3	0	–		2 (Note: Appearances in the promotion play-offs)	0	47	3
Shinnik Yaroslavl	2012–13	FNL	27	0	1	0	–		–		28	0
Shinnik Yaroslavl	Total		113	3	7	0	0	0	2	0	122	3
Ufa	2013–14	FNL	28	0	1	0	–		6 (Note: Two appearances in the promotion play-offs, four appearances in the FNL Cup)	0	35	0
Ufa	2014–15	RPL	21	0	2	0	–		–		23	0
Ufa	2015–16	RPL	17	0	0	0	–		–		17	0
Ufa	2016–17	RPL	25	3	2	0	–		–		27	3
Ufa	2017–18	RPL	10	0	1	0	–		–		11	0
Ufa	2018–19	RPL	14	0	1	0	1 (Note: Appearance in the UEFA Europa League)	0	2 (Note: Appearances in the relegation play-offs)	0	18	0
Ufa	2019–20	RPL	28	0	1	0	–		–		29	0
Ufa	2020–21	RPL	14	0	2	0	–		–		16	0
Ufa	2021–22	RPL	8	0	2	0	–		2	0	12	0
Ufa	Total		165	3	12	0	1	0	10	0	188	3
Career total			279	6	21	0	1	0	12	0	313	6
