= Giorgi Sheliya =

Russian footballer

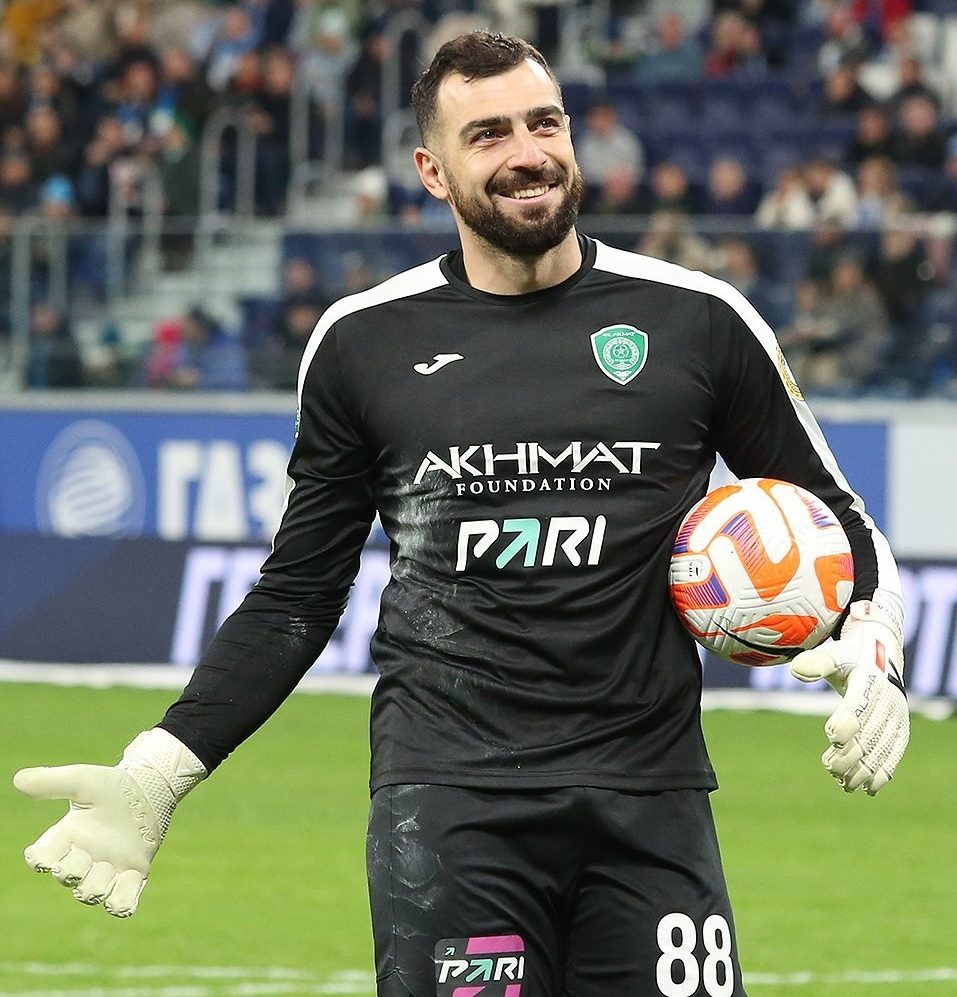
- Sheliya with Akhmat Grozny in 2022

Personal information
- Full name: Giorgi Levanovich Sheliya
- Date of birth: 11 December 1988 (age 37)
- Place of birth: Moscow, Soviet Union
- Height: 1.90 m (6 ft 3 in)
- Position: Goalkeeper

Team information
- Current team: Akhmat Grozny
- Number: 88

Youth career
- Dynamo Moscow

Senior career*
Years	Team	Apps	(Gls)
2007–2012	Dynamo Bryansk	50	(0)
2012–2015	Baltika Kaliningrad	48	(0)
2015–2016	Yenisey Krasnoyarsk	24	(0)
2016–2018	Ufa	24	(0)
2019–2020	Tambov	43	(0)
2020–	Akhmat Grozny	132	(0)
- * Club domestic league appearances and goals as of 2 August 2026

Giorgi Levanovich Sheliya (Russian: Гиорги Леванович Шелия; Georgian: გიორგი შელია; born 11 December 1988) is a Russian professional footballer who plays as a goalkeeper for Akhmat Grozny.

== Club career ==
On 11 January 2019, Sheliya was released from his FC Ufa contract by mutual consent. Five days later, 16 January 2019, Sheliya signed a 2.5-year contract with FC Tambov. On 1 August 2020, Sheliya left Tambov to sign for Akhmat Grozny on a two-year contract, with the option of an additional year. On 24 May 2022, Sheliya extended his contract with Akhmat until the end of the 2023–24 season.

== Career statistics ==
=== Club ===
As of match played 3 September 2026

Appearances and goals by club, season and competition
Club	Season	League			Cup		Europe		Other		Total	
Club	Season	Division	Apps	Goals	Apps	Goals	Apps	Goals	Apps	Goals	Apps	Goals
Dynamo Bryansk	2007	Russian First League	0	0	0	0	—		—		0	0
Dynamo Bryansk	2008	Russian First League	11	0	1	0	—		—		12	0
Dynamo Bryansk	2009	PFL	14	0	1	0	—		—		15	0
Dynamo Bryansk	2010	Russian First League	22	0	1	0	—		—		23	0
Dynamo Bryansk	2011–12	Russian First League	3	0	1	0	—		—		4	0
Dynamo Bryansk	Total		50	0	4	0	0	0	0	0	54	0
Baltika Kaliningrad	2012–13	Russian First League	11	0	0	0	—		2 (Note: Appearances in the FNL Cup)	0	13	0
Baltika Kaliningrad	2013–14	Russian First League	16	0	0	0	—		—		16	0
Baltika Kaliningrad	2014–15	Russian First League	21	0	1	0	—		—		22	0
Baltika Kaliningrad	Total		48	0	1	0	0	0	2	0	51	0
Yenisey Krasnoyarsk	2015–16	Russian First League	24	0	2	0	—		—		26	0
Ufa	2015–16	Russian Premier League	12	0	1	0	—		—		13	0
Ufa	2016–17	Russian Premier League	11	0	2	0	—		—		13	0
Ufa	2017–18	Russian Premier League	0	0	1	0	—		—		1	0
Ufa	2018–19	Russian Premier League	1	0	1	0	0	0	—		2	0
Ufa	Total		24	0	5	0	0	0	0	0	29	0
Tambov	2018–19	Russian First League	14	0	0	0	—		3	0	17	0
Tambov	2019–20	Russian Premier League	29	0	0	0	—		2	0	31	0
Tambov	Total		43	0	0	0	0	0	5	0	48	0
Akhmat Grozny	2020–21	Russian Premier League	16	0	1	0	—		—		17	0
Akhmat Grozny	2021–22	Russian Premier League	16	0	0	0	—		—		16	0
Akhmat Grozny	2022–23	Russian Premier League	29	0	5	0	—		—		34	0
Akhmat Grozny	2023–24	Russian Premier League	25	0	3	0	—		—		28	0
Akhmat Grozny	2024–25	Russian Premier League	27	0	2	0	—		1 (Note: Appearance in the relegation play-offs)	0	30	0
Akhmat Grozny	2025–26	Russian Premier League	17	0	1	0	—		—		18	0
Akhmat Grozny	2026–27	Russian Premier League	2	0	2	0	—		—		4	0
Akhmat Grozny	Total		132	0	14	0	0	0	1	0	147	0
Career total			321	0	26	0	0	0	8	0	355	0
