= Aleksandr Belenov =

Russian footballer (born 1986)

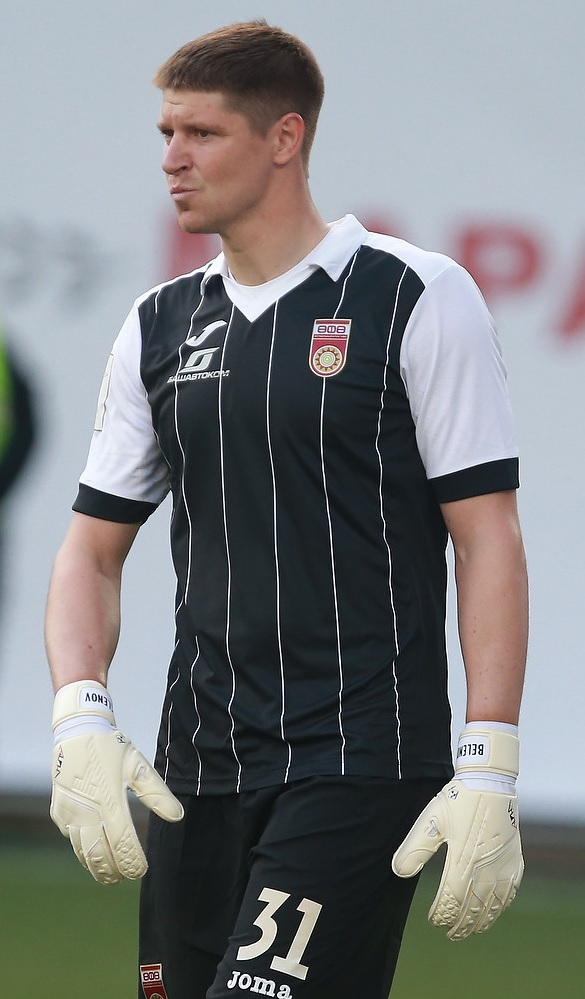
- Belenov with FC Ufa in 2017

Personal information
- Full name: Aleksandr Vasilyevich Belenov
- Date of birth: 13 September 1986 (age 40)
- Place of birth: Belgorod, Russian SFSR
- Height: 1.97 m (6 ft 6 in)
- Position: Goalkeeper

Team information
- Current team: Ufa
- Number: 31

Youth career
- Salyut Belgorod

Senior career*
Years	Team	Apps	(Gls)
2004–2010	Salyut Belgorod	89	(0)
2010–2011	Spartak Moscow	1	(0)
2011–2016	Kuban Krasnodar	143	(0)
2016	Anzhi Makhachkala	17	(0)
2017–2022	Ufa	151	(0)
2022–2023	Rubin Kazan	3	(0)
2023–2025	Fakel Voronezh	36	(0)
2025–	Ufa	31	(0)

International career^{‡}
2004	Russia U-18	8	(1)
2012	Russia-2	1	(0)
- * Club domestic league appearances and goals as of 16 May 2026 ‡ National team caps and goals as of 9 September 2012

Aleksandr Vasilyevich Belenov (Russian: Александр Васильевич Беленов; born 13 September 1986) is a Russian professional footballer who plays as a goalkeeper for Ufa.

== Career ==
=== Salyut Belgorod ===
He made his professional debut in the Russian Second Division in 2004 for FC Salyut-Energia Belgorod. There he played for seven years.

=== Spartak Moscow ===
In 2010, he joined FC Spartak Moscow. Due to little playing time he chose to leave the team in 2011.

=== Kuban Krasnodar ===
He joined FC Kuban Krasnodar for €350k. He quickly established himself as #1 goalkeeper.

=== Fakel Voronezh ===
On 28 June 2023, Belenov signed with Fakel Voronezh. On 28 May 2024, his contract with Fakel was extended.

== International ==
He was called up to the Russian national football team for the first time for a friendly game against the United States on 15 November 2012.

== Individual honours ==
- List of 33 top players of the Russian league: #3 (2013/14).

== Career statistics ==
=== Club ===
As of match played 16 May 2026

Appearances and goals by club, season and competition
Club	Season	League			Cup		Europe		Other		Total	
Club	Season	Division	Apps	Goals	Apps	Goals	Apps	Goals	Apps	Goals	Apps	Goals
Salyut Belgorod	2004	Russian Football National League 2	2	0	1	0	—		—		3	0
Salyut Belgorod	2005	Russian Football National League 2	6	0	0	0	—		—		6	0
Salyut Belgorod	2006	Russian First League	10	0	1	0	—		—		11	0
Salyut Belgorod	2007	Russian First League	6	0	2	0	—		—		8	0
Salyut Belgorod	2008	Russian First League	26	0	2	0	—		—		28	0
Salyut Belgorod	2009	Russian First League	20	0	1	0	—		—		21	0
Salyut Belgorod	2010	Russian First League	19	0	0	0	—		—		19	0
Salyut Belgorod	Total		89	0	7	0	—		—		96	0
Spartak Moscow	2010	Russian Premier League	1	0	—		0	0	—		1	0
Spartak Moscow	2011–12	Russian Premier League	0	0	0	0	—		—		0	0
Spartak Moscow	Total		1	0	0	0	0	0	—		1	0
Kuban Krasnodar	2011–12	Russian Premier League	24	0	0	0	—		—		24	0
Kuban Krasnodar	2012–13	Russian Premier League	30	0	3	0	—		—		33	0
Kuban Krasnodar	2013–14	Russian Premier League	30	0	0	0	10 (Note: Appearances in the UEFA Europa League)	0	—		40	0
Kuban Krasnodar	2014–15	Russian Premier League	30	0	4	0	—		—		34	0
Kuban Krasnodar	2015–16	Russian Premier League	29	0	2	0	—		2 (Note: Appearances in relegation play-offs)	0	33	0
Kuban Krasnodar	Total		143	0	9	0	10	0	2	0	164	0
Anzhi Makhachkala	2016–17	Russian Premier League	17	0	0	0	—		—		17	0
Ufa	2016–17	Russian Premier League	10	0	1	0	—		—		11	0
Ufa	2017–18	Russian Premier League	30	0	0	0	—		—		30	0
Ufa	2018–19	Russian Premier League	29	0	0	0	6	0	2	0	37	0
Ufa	2019–20	Russian Premier League	26	0	2	0	—		—		28	0
Ufa	2020–21	Russian Premier League	29	0	3	0	—		—		32	0
Ufa	2021–22	Russian Premier League	27	0	0	0	—		—		27	0
Ufa	Total		151	0	6	0	6	0	2	0	165	0
Rubin Kazan	2022–23	Russian First League	3	0	1	0	—		—		4	0
Fakel	2023–24	Russian Premier League	24	0	1	0	—		—		25	0
Fakel	2024–25	Russian Premier League	12	0	1	0	—		—		13	0
Fakel	Total		36	0	2	0	—		—		38	0
Ufa	2025–26	Russian First League	31	0	0	0	—		—		31	0
Career total			471	0	25	0	16	0	4	0	516	0
