= Yerkebulan Seydakhmet =

Kazakhstani footballer

Personal information
- Full name: Yerkebulan Kayratuly Seydakhmet
- Date of birth: 4 February 2000 (age 26)
- Place of birth: Taraz, Kazakhstan
- Height: 1.80 m (5 ft 11 in)
- Position: Winger

Team information
- Current team: Aktobe
- Number: 22

Youth career
- Montazhnik Taraz

Senior career*
Years	Team	Apps	(Gls)
2017–2018	Taraz	15	(1)
2018–2019	Ufa	3	(0)
2019	→ Levski Sofia (loan)	3	(0)
2019–2025	Kairat	78	(4)
2020	→ Zhetysu (loan)	6	(0)
2025–	Aktobe	31	(1)

International career^{‡}
2016	Kazakhstan U17	3	(1)
2017	Kazakhstan U19	9	(2)
2017–2021	Kazakhstan U21	16	(2)
2018–	Kazakhstan	6	(2)
- * Club domestic league appearances and goals as of 1 November 2026 ‡ National team caps and goals as of 17 April 2023

Yerkebulan Kayratuly Seydakhmet (Kazakh: Еркебұлан Қайратұлы Сейдахмет, Erkebūlan Qairatūly Seidahmet; born 4 February 2000) is a Kazakh professional footballer who plays as a winger for Kazakh club Aktobe and the Kazakhstan national team.

== Club career ==
He made his Kazakhstan Premier League debut for FC Taraz on 1 April 2017 in a game against FC Tobol.

On 12 February 2018, he signed with a Russian Premier League side FC Ufa. He made his debut for Ufa as a second-half substitute in a league game against FC Anzhi Makhachkala on 10 March 2018.

On 28 February 2019, Seydakhmet was loaned to Bulgarian club Levski Sofia until the end of the calendar year. However, in mid-June, his loan spell was prematurely terminated after he was deemed surplus to the needs of the team by the new manager Petar Houbchev.

=== Kairat ===
On 25 June 2019, FC Kairat announced the signing of Seydakhmet on a three-year contract, with an option of another two, from FC Ufa.

== Career statistics ==
=== Club ===
As of match played 10 November 2019

Club	Season	League			Cup		Continental		Other		Total	
Club	Season	Division	Apps	Goals	Apps	Goals	Apps	Goals	Apps	Goals	Apps	Goals
Taraz	2017	Kazakhstan Premier League	15	1	1	0	–		–		16	1
Ufa	2017–18	Russian Premier League	2	0	0	0	–		–		2	0
Ufa	2018–19	Russian Premier League	1	0	1	0	0	0	–		2	0
Ufa	Total		3	0	1	0	0	0	-	-	4	0
Levski Sofia (loan)	2018–19	First Professional Football League	3	0	0	0	–		–		3	0
Kairat	2019	Kazakhstan Premier League	13	1	0	0	3	0	0	0	16	1
Career total			34	2	2	0	3	0	0	0	39	2

=== International ===
Kazakhstan national team
Year	Apps	Goals
2018	6	2
Total	6	2

Statistics accurate as of match played 16 October 2018

=== International goals ===
Scores and results list Kazakhstan's goal tally first.

No	Date	Venue	Opponent	Score	Result	Competition
1.	23 March 2018	Groupama Arena, Budapest, Hungary	Hungary	3–1	3–2	Friendly
2.	16 October 2018	Astana Arena, Astana, Kazakhstan	Andorra	1–0	4–0	2018–19 UEFA Nations League D
