= Jordan Gobron =

French footballer (born 1992)

Personal information
- Date of birth: 4 June 1992 (age 34)
- Place of birth: Rouen, France
- Height: 1.75 m (5 ft 9 in)
- Position: Left back

Team information
- Current team: Oissel

Youth career
- 2006–2007: Le Havre
- 2007–2010: Amiens
- 2010–2012: Valenciennes

Senior career*
Years	Team	Apps	(Gls)
2012–2018	Quevilly-Rouen	90	(2)
2018–2019	Progrès Niederkorn	16	(0)
2020–2021	Quevilly-Rouen	14	(0)
2021–2023	Béziers	34	(1)
2024–	Oissel	5	(0)
- * Club domestic league appearances and goals as of 7 December 2024

Jordan Gobron (born 4 June 1992) is a French professional footballer who plays as a left-back for Championnat National 3 club Oissel.

== Professional career ==
Mendy made his professional debut for Quevilly-Rouen in a Ligue 2 1–1 tie with FC Lorient on 29 July 2017.

In July 2018, Gobron joined Progrès Niederkorn. In April 2019, he was excluded from the squad due to "unprofessional behavior" and his contract was later terminated. In January 2020, he returned to Quevilly-Rouen.

On 5 August 2021, he joined fourth-tier club Béziers.
