= Mikhail Borodko =

Russian footballer

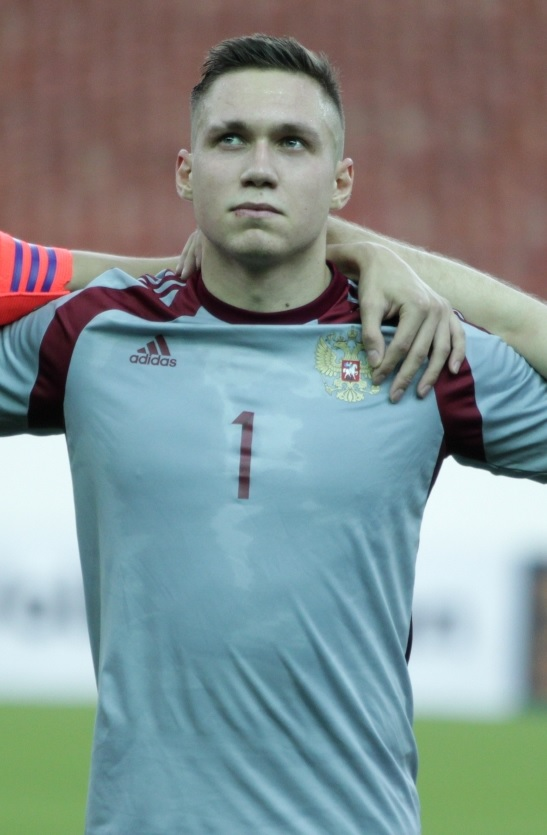
- Borodko with Russia U-21 in 2016

Personal information
- Full name: Mikhail Yevgenyevich Borodko
- Date of birth: 12 July 1994 (age 32)
- Place of birth: Krasnoyarsk, Russia
- Height: 1.87 m (6 ft 2 in)
- Position: Goalkeeper

Senior career*
Years	Team	Apps	(Gls)
2011–2014	FC Yenisey Krasnoyarsk	0	(0)
2014–2015	FC Metallurg Novokuznetsk	3	(0)
2015	FC Baikal Irkutsk	17	(0)
2016	FC Yenisey Krasnoyarsk	5	(0)
2016–2017	FC Ufa	0	(0)
2017–2019	FC Nizhny Novgorod	10	(0)
2019	→ FC Kaluga (loan)	9	(0)
2020–2021	FC Kaluga	44	(0)

International career
2016	Russia U-21	6	(0)
- * Club domestic league appearances and goals

Mikhail Yevgenyevich Borodko (Russian: Михаил Евгеньевич Бородько; born 12 July 1994) is a Russian former football player.

== Club career ==
He made his professional debut in the Russian Professional Football League for FC Metallurg Novokuznetsk on 3 October 2014 in a game against FC Smena Komsomolsk-na-Amure.

He made his Russian Football National League debut for FC Baikal Irkutsk on 17 August 2015 in a game against FC Yenisey Krasnoyarsk.
