= Igor Bezdenezhnykh =

Russian professional football player

- Bezdenezhnykh with Kuban Krasnodar in 2022

Personal information
- Full name: Igor Igorevich Bezdenezhnykh
- Date of birth: 8 August 1996 (age 30)
- Place of birth: Ufa, Russia
- Height: 1.78 m (5 ft 10 in)
- Position: Midfielder

Team information
- Current team: FC Luki-Energiya Velikiye Luki
- Number: 24

Youth career
- –2009: SDYuShOR-26 Ufa
- 2009–2010: Orlyonok Ufa
- 2010: FC Voskhod Ufa
- 2010–2012: Orlyonok Ufa
- 2012–2015: FC Ufa

Senior career*
Years	Team	Apps	(Gls)
2015–2021	FC Ufa	45	(0)
2018	→ FC Olimpiyets Nizhny Novgorod (loan)	1	(0)
2018	→ FC Ufa-2	11	(2)
2019–2020	→ FC Chayka Peschanokopskoye (loan)	22	(5)
2020–2021	→ FC Chayka Peschanokopskoye (loan)	18	(0)
2021–2023	FC Kuban Krasnodar	40	(1)
2023	Tekstilshchik Ivanovo	0	(0)
2023–2025	FC Kuban Krasnodar	82	(7)
2026–	FC Luki-Energiya Velikiye Luki	5	(1)

International career^{‡}
2014–2015	Russia U-19	8	(3)
2016–2017	Russia U-21	10	(1)
- * Club domestic league appearances and goals as of 1 November 2026 ‡ National team caps and goals as of 31 May 2017

Igor Igorevich Bezdenezhnykh (Russian: Игорь Игоревич Безденежных; born 8 August 1996) is a Russian professional football player who plays as a central midfielder for FC Luki-Energiya Velikiye Luki.

== Club career ==
He made his professional debut on 17 May 2015 for FC Ufa in a Russian Football Premier League game against FC Zenit Saint Petersburg.

On 2 July 2019, he joined FC Chayka Peschanokopskoye on loan.

On 16 October 2020, he returned to FC Chayka Peschanokopskoye on another loan. On 30 June 2021, his contract with Ufa was terminated by mutual consent.

== International ==
He represented Russia national under-19 football team at the 2015 UEFA European Under-19 Championship, where Russia came in second place.

== Career statistics ==
=== Club ===
As of 12 May 2018

Club	Season	League			Cup		Continental		Total	
Club	Season	Division	Apps	Goals	Apps	Goals	Apps	Goals	Apps	Goals
FC Ufa	2012–13	FNL	0	0	0	0	–		0	0
FC Ufa	2013–14	FNL	0	0	0	0	–		0	0
FC Ufa	2014–15	Russian Premier League	1	0	0	0	–		1	0
FC Ufa	2015–16	Russian Premier League	5	0	1	0	–		6	0
FC Ufa	2016–17	Russian Premier League	20	0	1	0	–		21	0
FC Ufa	2017–18	Russian Premier League	3	0	0	0	–		3	0
FC Ufa	Total		29	0	2	0	0	0	31	0
FC Olimpiyets Nizhny Novgorod	2017–18	FNL	1	0	–		–		1	0
Career total			30	0	2	0	0	0	32	0
