= Ondřej Vaněk =

Czech footballer (born 1990)

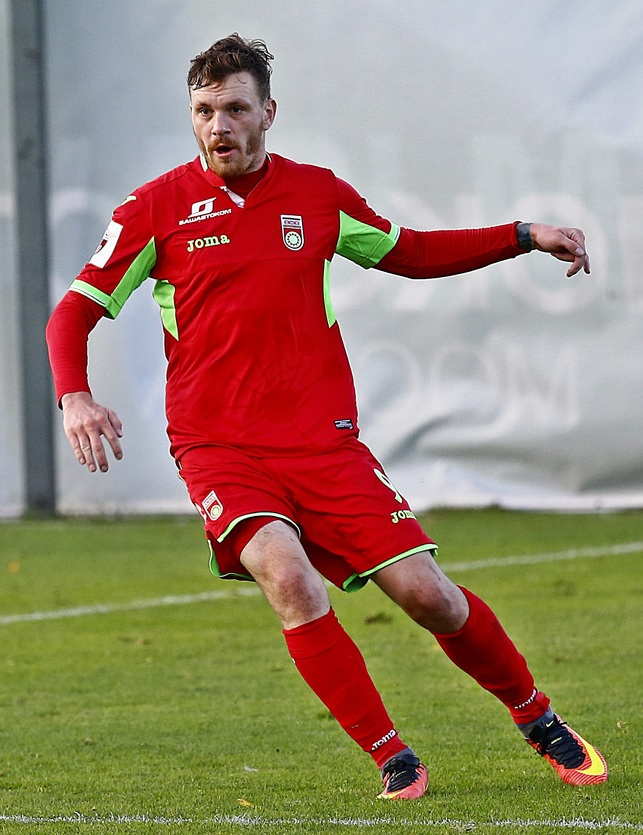
- Vaněk with Ufa in 2016

Personal information
- Date of birth: 5 July 1990 (age 36)
- Place of birth: Brno, Czechoslovakia
- Height: 1.79 m (5 ft 10 in)
- Position: Midfielder

Team information
- Current team: SK Dolní Chabry

Youth career
- Zbrojovka Brno
- 2008–2009: Slavia Prague

Senior career*
Years	Team	Apps	(Gls)
2009–2010	Slavia Prague	2	(0)
2010	→ Hlučín (loan)	12	(0)
2010–2013	Jablonec	73	(9)
2014	Kayserispor	11	(0)
2014–2016	Viktoria Plzeň	48	(7)
2016–2019	Ufa	44	(8)
2019–2022	Zbrojovka Brno	33	(5)
2022–	SK Dolní Chabry		

International career^{‡}
2012	Czech Republic U-21	4	(1)
2013–2015	Czech Republic	8	(0)
- * Club domestic league appearances and goals as of 20 February 2021 ‡ National team caps and goals as of 9 August 2015

Ondřej Vaněk (born 5 July 1990) is a Czech football central midfielder who plays for SK Dolní Chabry. He has also played for the Czech under-21 team.

== Club career ==
On 9 July 2016, he signed a four-year contract with the Russian side Ufa. He was released from his Ufa contract by mutual consent on 16 August 2019.

On 5 September 2019, he signed with Zbrojovka Brno.

== Career statistics ==
=== Club ===
As of 13 May 2018

Club	Season	League			Cup		Continental		Other		Total	
Club	Season	Division	Apps	Goals	Apps	Goals	Apps	Goals	Apps	Goals	Apps	Goals
Slavia Prague	2009–10	Czech First League	2	0	0	0	0	0	–		2	0
Hlučín	2010–11	Czech National Football League	12	0	0	0	–		–		12	0
Jablonec	2010–11	Czech First League	8	2	2	0	–		–		10	2
Jablonec	2011–12	Czech First League	21	0	4	2	3	0	–		28	2
Jablonec	2012–13	Czech First League	28	2	7	8	–		–		35	10
Jablonec	2013–14	Czech First League	16	5	3	0	4	1	1 (Note: One appearance in the Czech Supercup)	0	24	6
Jablonec	Total		73	9	16	10	7	1	1	0	97	20
Kayserispor	2013–14	Süper Lig	11	0	–		–		–		11	0
Viktoria Plzeň	2014–15	Czech First League	29	5	5	1	2	0	–		36	6
Viktoria Plzeň	2015–16	Czech First League	19	2	4	0	6	1	1 (Note: One appearance in the Czech Supercup)	0	30	3
Viktoria Plzeň	Total		48	7	9	1	8	1	1	0	66	9
Ufa	2016–17	Russian Premier League	16	2	3	0	–		–		19	2
Ufa	2017–18	Russian Premier League	11	3	0	0	–		–		11	3
Ufa	Total		27	5	3	0	0	0	0	0	30	5
Career total			173	21	28	11	15	2	2	0	218	34
