= Azamat Zaseyev =

Russian footballer

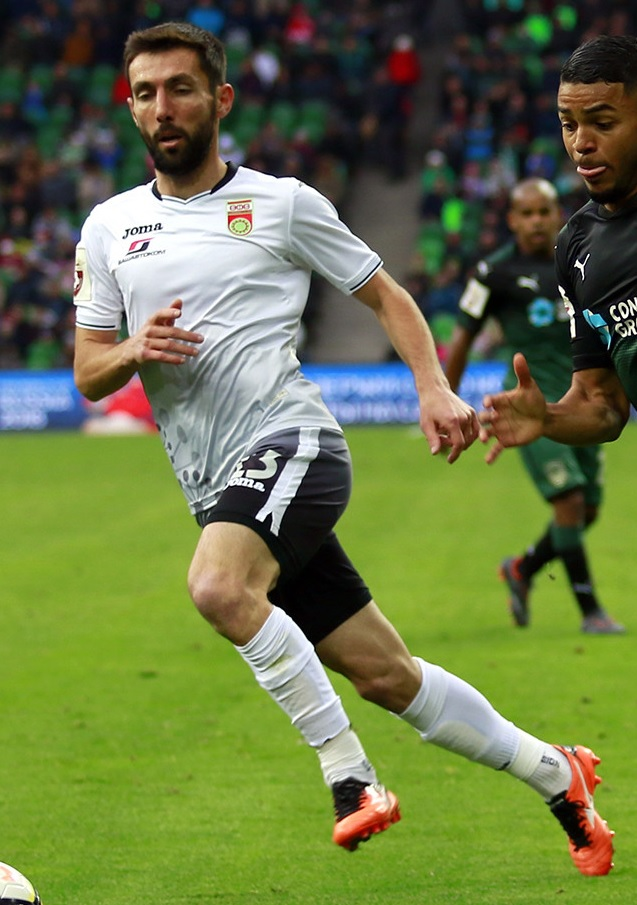
- Zaseyev with FC Ufa in 2018

Personal information
- Full name: Azamat Vyacheslavovich Zaseyev
- Date of birth: 29 June 1988 (age 38)
- Place of birth: Ordzhonikidze, Russian SFSR
- Height: 1.79 m (5 ft 10 1/2 in)
- Positions: Defender; midfielder

Senior career*
Years	Team	Apps	(Gls)
2005	Alania Vladikavkaz	0	(0)
2006–2008	Krylia Sovetov Samara	0	(0)
2010	Beslan-FAYUR Beslan	29	(0)
2011–2019	FC Ufa	184	(0)
2019–2024	Alania Vladikavkaz	111	(3)
- * Club domestic league appearances and goals

Azamat Vyacheslavovich Zaseyev (Russian: Азамат Вячеславович Засеев; born 29 June 1988) is a Russian former professional football player.

== Club career ==
He advanced with FC Ufa from the third-tier PFL to Russian Premier League, where he made his debut on 3 August 2014 in a game against FC Kuban Krasnodar.

== Career statistics ==
=== Club ===
As of 13 May 2018

Club	Season	League			Cup		Continental		Other		Total	
Club	Season	Division	Apps	Goals	Apps	Goals	Apps	Goals	Apps	Goals	Apps	Goals
FC Alania Vladikavkaz	2005	Russian Premier League	0	0	1	0	–		–		1	0
FC Krylia Sovetov Samara	2006	Russian Premier League	0	0	0	0	–		–		0	0
FC Krylia Sovetov Samara	2007	Russian Premier League	0	0	1	0	–		–		1	0
FC Krylia Sovetov Samara	2008	Russian Premier League	0	0	0	0	–		–		0	0
FC Krylia Sovetov Samara	Total		0	0	1	0	0	0	0	0	1	0
FC Beslan-FAYUR Beslan	2010	PFL	29	0	1	0	–		–		30	0
FC Ufa	2011–12	PFL	36	0	0	0	–		–		36	0
FC Ufa	2012–13	FNL	29	0	1	0	–		–		30	0
FC Ufa	2013–14	FNL	32	0	1	0	–		1 (Note: One appearance in promotion play-offs)	0	34	0
FC Ufa	2014–15	Russian Premier League	28	0	2	0	–		–		30	0
FC Ufa	2015–16	Russian Premier League	10	0	1	0	–		–		11	0
FC Ufa	2016–17	Russian Premier League	25	0	2	1	–		–		27	1
FC Ufa	2017–18	Russian Premier League	18	0	0	0	–		–		18	0
FC Ufa	Total		178	0	7	1	0	0	1	0	186	1
Career total			207	0	10	1	0	0	1	0	218	1
