= Neftyanik Stadium =

Multi-purpose stadium in Ufa, Russia

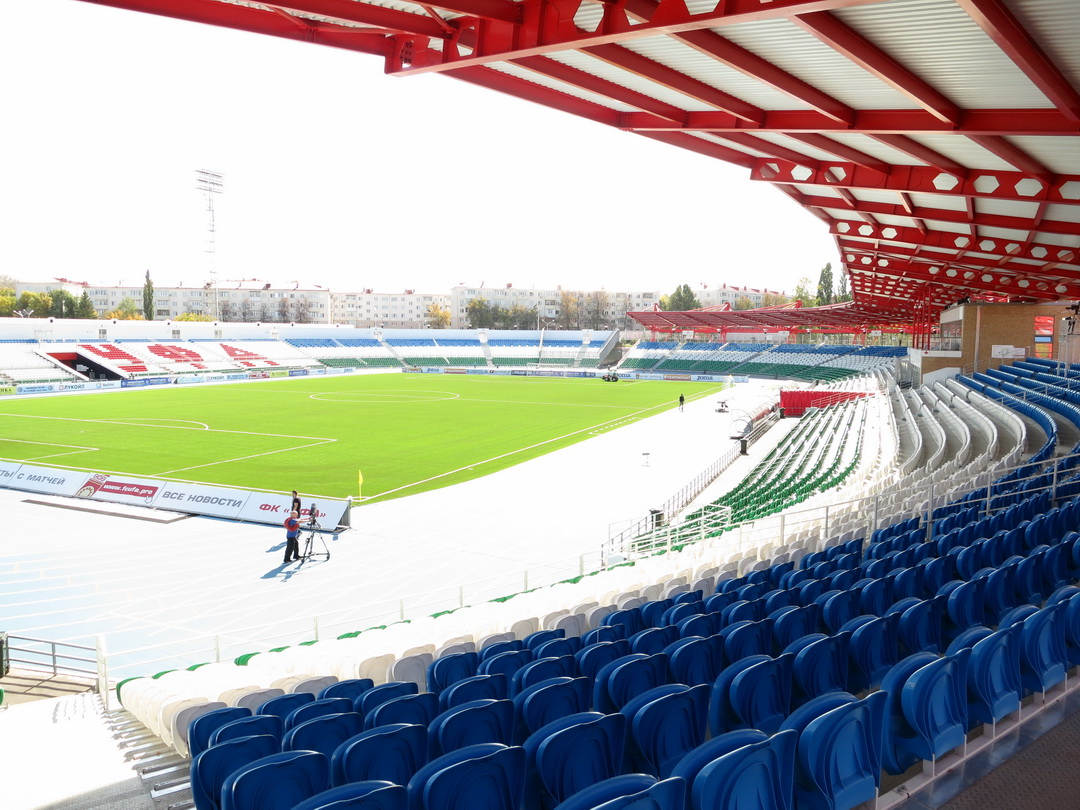
- Interactive map of Neftyanik Stadium
- Former names: BetBoom Arena (2021-2022)
- Address: Komarova 9.
- Location: Ufa, Russia
- Coordinates: 54°49′34″N 56°03′42″E
- Capacity: 15,132 (Russian Premier League)
- Surface: Artificial turf
- Scoreboard: Yes
- Field size: 105x68m
- Public transit: Neftyanik Stadium (bus, trolleybus and shuttle bus)

Construction
- Built: 1953
- Opened: 1967
- Renovated: 2015

Tenant
- FC Ufa (2015–present)

Neftyanik Stadium, formerly BetBoom Arena is a multi-purpose stadium in Ufa, Russia. It is currently used mostly for football matches and is the home stadium of FC Ufa. The stadium holds 15,234 people, all seated (of which 1,832 seats are in fan sectors). The field measures 105x68 metres, with artificial turf and automatic heating system.

The stadium entered reconstruction on 2012 to meet the rapidly changing needs of FC Ufa that made a rapid rise to the Russian Premier League, and was inaugurated on August 9, 2015, when the club hosted the reigning Russian champions Zenit. The home team narrowly lost the game 1-0 and the only goal of the game was scored by Danny.

Neftyanik also hosted 2018–19 UEFA Europa League home games for Ufa from the second qualifying round until the defeat from the play-off round with Rangers. Out the 3 matches hosted, Ufa won 1, while drawing the remaining 2.

The stadium was formerly named BetBoom Arena during BetBoom's sponsorship with FC Ufa. After the termination of the sponsorship, the name was reverted to Neftyanik Stadium.

== Facilities ==
The stadium also houses a recreation center, gym, sports hall and a swimming pool. The Neft Fitness Club is a joint-venture between FC Ufa and Persona Sport Fitness Holding. Other sports playable in the gym are minifootball, volleyball, basketball and tennis.

== Notable Matches ==
=== UEFA Europa League ===
Date	Time (YEKT)	Team #1	Result	Team #2	Round	Attendance
26 July 2018	19:00	Ufa (Russia)	0-0 Agg: 1-1 (a)	(Slovenia) Domžale	2Q	11,210
9 August 2018	19:00	Ufa (Russia)	2-1 Agg: 4-3	(Luxembourg) Progrès Niederkorn	3Q	6,794
30 August 2018	19:00	Ufa (Russia)	1-1 Agg: 1-2	(Scotland) Rangers	PO	13,186
