= Victor Patrașco =

Moldovan footballer

Personal information
- Date of birth: 26 September 1998 (age 28)
- Place of birth: Chișinău, Moldova
- Height: 1.85 m (6 ft 1 in)
- Position: Defender

Youth career
- FC Spartak Moscow

Senior career*
Years	Team	Apps	(Gls)
2016	FC Academia Chișinău	19	(0)
2017–2019	FC Ufa	0	(0)
2018–2019	→ FC Luch Vladivostok (loan)	10	(0)
2019–2021	FC Shinnik Yaroslavl	5	(0)

International career
2016	Moldova U-19	3	(0)
- * Club domestic league appearances and goals

Victor Patrașco (born 26 September 1998) is a Moldovan former football player who played as a left-back. He also holds Russian citizenship as Viktor Viktorovich Patrashko (Russian: Виктор Викторович Патрашко).

== Club career ==
He made his debut in the Russian Premier League for FC Ufa on 15 April 2017 in a game against FC Amkar Perm.

On 18 June 2019, he signed a two-year contract with FC Shinnik Yaroslavl.

== Career statistics ==
=== Club ===
As of 10 December 2017

Club	Season	League			Cup		Continental		Total	
Club	Season	Division	Apps	Goals	Apps	Goals	Apps	Goals	Apps	Goals
FC Academia Chișinău	2015–16	Moldovan National Division	5	0	0	0	–		5	0
FC Academia Chișinău	2016–17	Moldovan National Division	14	0	0	0	–		14	0
FC Academia Chișinău	Total		19	0	0	0	0	0	19	0
FC Ufa	2016–17	Russian Premier League	0	0	0	0	–		0	0
FC Ufa	2017–18	Russian Premier League	1	0	0	0	–		1	0
FC Ufa	Total		1	0	0	0	0	0	1	0
Career total			20	0	0	0	0	0	20	0
