= Andrei Batyutin =

Russian footballer

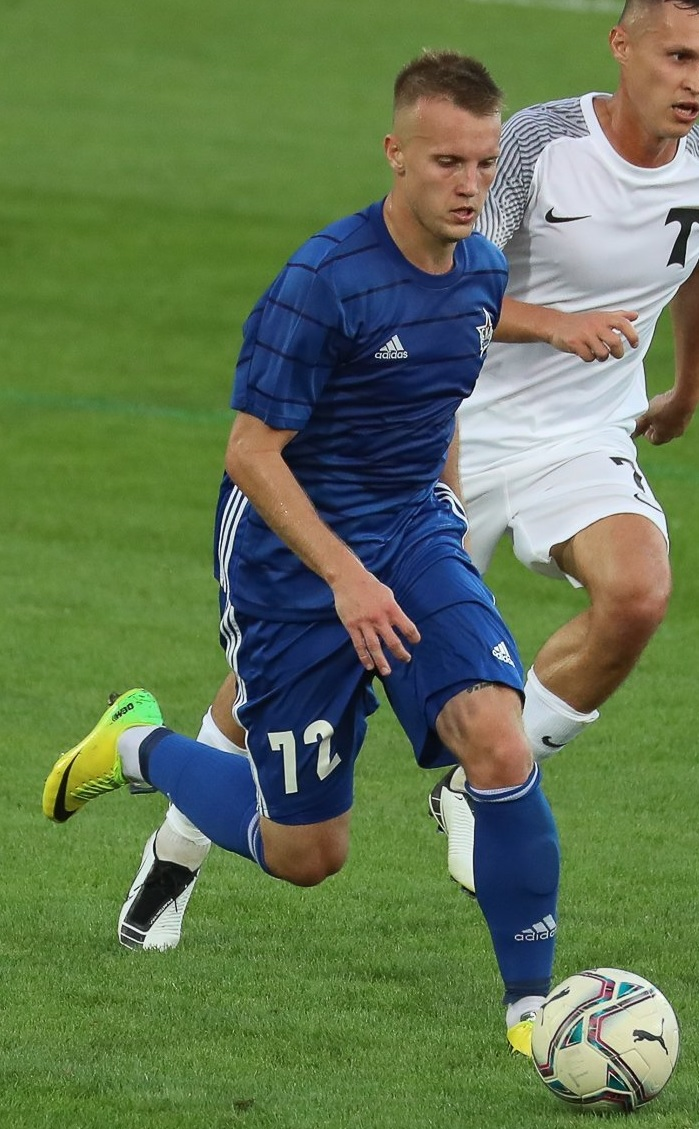
- Batyutin with SKA-Khabarovsk in 2021

Personal information
- Full name: Andrei Andreyevich Batyutin
- Date of birth: 28 May 1995 (age 31)
- Place of birth: Krasnodar, Russia
- Height: 1.76 m (5 ft 9 in)
- Positions: Midfielder; forward

Youth career
- –2016: FC Krasnodar
- 2016: FC Ufa

Senior career*
Years	Team	Apps	(Gls)
2014–2015	FC Krasnodar	0	(0)
2014–2016	FC Krasnodar-2	43	(10)
2016–2020	FC Ufa	1	(0)
2017	→ FC Zenit-2 Saint Petersburg (loan)	14	(1)
2017–2018	→ FC Dynamo Saint Petersburg (loan)	18	(2)
2018–2019	→ FC Avangard Kursk (loan)	28	(2)
2019–2020	→ FC Avangard Kursk (loan)	18	(1)
2020–2021	FC SKA-Khabarovsk	30	(1)
2021	FC SKA-Khabarovsk-2	10	(4)
2022–2023	FC Shinnik Yaroslavl	34	(3)
- * Club domestic league appearances and goals

Andrei Andreyevich Batyutin (Russian: Андрей Андреевич Батютин; born 28 May 1995) is a Russian former football player.

== Club career ==
He made his professional debut in the Russian Professional Football League for FC Krasnodar-2 on 12 August 2014 in a game against FC Afips Afipsky.

He made his debut in the Russian Premier League for FC Ufa on 14 August 2016 in a game against FC Tom Tomsk.
