= Vladimir Zubarev =

Russian footballer

Personal information
- Full name: Vladimir Yuryevich Zubarev
- Date of birth: 5 January 1993 (age 33)
- Place of birth: Volgograd, Russia
- Height: 1.80 m (5 ft 11 in)
- Position: Midfielder

Youth career
- Olimpia Volgograd
- –2013: Spartak Moscow

Senior career*
Years	Team	Apps	(Gls)
2013–2015	Spartak-2 Moscow	53	(2)
2013	Spartak Moscow	0	(0)
2016–2018	Ufa	22	(1)
2018	→ Khimki (loan)	4	(0)
2018	→ Ufa-2	11	(0)
2020	Smorgon	5	(1)

International career
2011	Russia U18	4	(0)
2012	Russia U19	1	(0)
2014	Russia U21	5	(3)
- * Club domestic league appearances and goals

Vladimir Yuryevich Zubarev (Russian: Владимир Юрьевич Зубарев; born 5 January 1993) is a Russian former football player who played as a defensive midfielder.

== Club career ==
He made his debut in the Russian Professional Football League for FC Spartak-2 Moscow on 16 July 2013 in a game against FC Dynamo Bryansk.

On 1 December 2018, he was released from his FC Ufa contract by mutual consent.

== Career statistics ==
=== Club ===
As of 9 December 2018

Club	Season	League			Cup		Continental		Total	
Club	Season	Division	Apps	Goals	Apps	Goals	Apps	Goals	Apps	Goals
FC Spartak Moscow	2010	Russian Premier League	0	0	0	0	0	0	0	0
FC Spartak Moscow	2011–12	Russian Premier League	0	0	0	0	0	0	0	0
FC Spartak Moscow	2012–13	Russian Premier League	0	0	0	0	0	0	0	0
FC Spartak Moscow	2013–14	Russian Premier League	0	0	0	0	0	0	0	0
FC Spartak Moscow	2014–15	Russian Premier League	0	0	0	0	–		0	0
FC Spartak Moscow	2015–16	Russian Premier League	0	0	0	0	–		0	0
FC Spartak Moscow	Total		0	0	0	0	0	0	0	0
FC Spartak-2 Moscow	2013–14	PFL	15	2	–		–		15	2
FC Spartak-2 Moscow	2014–15	PFL	17	0	–		–		17	0
FC Spartak-2 Moscow	2015–16	FNL	21	0	–		–		21	0
FC Spartak-2 Moscow	Total		53	2	0	0	0	0	53	2
FC Ufa	2015–16	Russian Premier League	11	1	1	0	–		12	1
FC Ufa	2016–17	Russian Premier League	9	0	2	0	–		11	0
FC Ufa	2017–18	Russian Premier League	2	0	1	0	–		3	0
FC Ufa	Total		22	1	4	0	0	0	26	1
FC Khimki	2017–18	FNL	4	0	–		–		4	0
FC Ufa-2	2018–19	PFL	11	0	–		–		11	0
Career total			90	3	4	0	0	0	94	3
