= Pavel Alikin =

Russian footballer

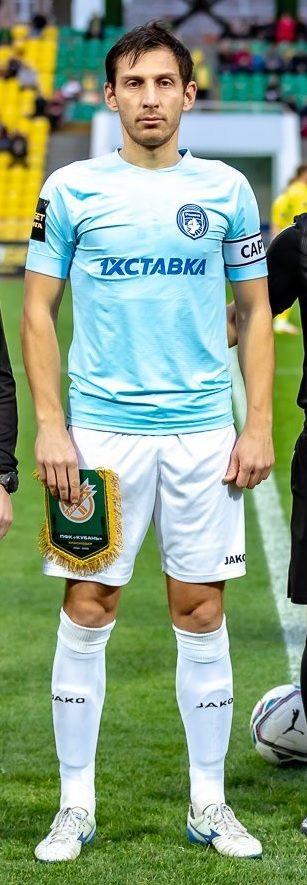
- Alikin with FC Rodina Moscow in 2022

Personal information
- Full name: Pavel Pavlovich Alikin
- Date of birth: 6 March 1984 (age 42)
- Place of birth: Perm, Russian SFSR
- Height: 1.85 m (6 ft 1 in)
- Position: Centre-back

Youth career
- Amkar Perm

Senior career*
| Years | Team | Apps | (Gls) |
| 2003–2007 | Amkar Perm | 10 | (0) |
| 2007 | Salyut-Energiya Belgorod | 5 | (0) |
| 2008 | Dynamo-Voronezh Voronezh | 29 | (2) |
| 2009 | FC Chita | 17 | (0) |
| 2010 | SKA-Energiya Khabarovsk | 5 | (0) |
| 2011–2021 | FC Ufa | 220 | (10) |
| 2021–2023 | Rodina Moscow | 47 | (1) |
- * Club domestic league appearances and goals

Pavel Pavlovich Alikin (Russian: Павел Павлович Аликин; born 6 March 1984) is a Russian former professional footballer. He played as a centre-back.

== Club career ==
He made his debut in the Russian Premier League in 2005 for FC Amkar Perm.

After 10 seasons with FC Ufa, on 14 July 2021 he signed with FC Rodina Moscow.

== Career statistics ==
=== Club ===
As of 13 May 2018

| Club | Season | League | | | Cup | | Continental | | Other | | Total | |
| Club | Season | Division | Apps | Goals | Apps | Goals | Apps | Goals | Apps | Goals | Apps | Goals |
|---|---|---|---|---|---|---|---|---|---|---|---|---|
| FC Amkar Perm | 2003 | FNL | 0 | 0 | 0 | 0 | – | | – | | 0 | 0 |
| FC Amkar Perm | 2004 | Russian Premier League | 0 | 0 | 0 | 0 | – | | – | | 0 | 0 |
| FC Amkar Perm | 2005 | Russian Premier League | 1 | 0 | 2 | 0 | – | | – | | 3 | 0 |
| FC Amkar Perm | 2006 | Russian Premier League | 9 | 0 | 3 | 0 | – | | – | | 12 | 0 |
| FC Amkar Perm | 2007 | Russian Premier League | 0 | 0 | 2 | 0 | – | | – | | 2 | 0 |
| FC Amkar Perm | Total | | 10 | 0 | 7 | 0 | 0 | 0 | 0 | 0 | 17 | 0 |
| FC Salyut-Energiya Belgorod | 2007 | FNL | 5 | 0 | 0 | 0 | – | | – | | 5 | 0 |
| FC Dynamo Voronezh | 2008 | PFL | 29 | 2 | 1 | 0 | – | | – | | 30 | 2 |
| FC Chita | 2009 | FNL | 17 | 0 | 1 | 0 | – | | – | | 18 | 0 |
| FC SKA-Energia Khabarovsk | 2010 | FNL | 5 | 0 | 0 | 0 | – | | – | | 5 | 0 |
| FC Ufa | 2011–12 | PFL | 34 | 2 | 1 | 0 | – | | – | | 35 | 2 |
| FC Ufa | 2012–13 | FNL | 19 | 0 | 0 | 0 | – | | – | | 19 | 0 |
| FC Ufa | 2013–14 | FNL | 34 | 1 | 1 | 0 | – | | 2 (Note: Two appearances in promotion play-offs) | 0 | 37 | 1 |
| FC Ufa | 2014–15 | Russian Premier League | 21 | 2 | 0 | 0 | – | | – | | 21 | 2 |
| FC Ufa | 2015–16 | Russian Premier League | 17 | 1 | 1 | 0 | – | | – | | 18 | 1 |
| FC Ufa | 2016–17 | Russian Premier League | 27 | 0 | 4 | 0 | – | | – | | 31 | 0 |
| FC Ufa | 2017–18 | Russian Premier League | 28 | 1 | 0 | 0 | – | | – | | 28 | 1 |
| FC Ufa | Total | | 180 | 7 | 7 | 0 | 0 | 0 | 2 | 0 | 189 | 7 |
| Career total | | | 246 | 9 | 16 | 0 | 0 | 0 | 2 | 0 | 264 | 9 |

== Honours ==
- Russian Cup finalist: 2008 (played in the early stages of the 2007/08 tournament for FC Amkar Perm.
