= 2021–22 FC Lokomotiv Moscow season =

Lokomotiv Moscow
2021–22 season
- Owner: Russian Railways
- General director: Vladimir Leonchenko
- Head coach: Markus Gisdol
- Stadium: RZD Arena
- Russian Premier League: 6th
- Russian Cup: Round of 16
- Russian Super Cup: Runners-up
- UEFA Europa League: Group stage
- Top goalscorer: League: Rifat Zhemaletdinov (9); All: Rifat Zhemaletdinov (9)
Home colours	Away colours	Third colours
- All statistics correct as of 21 May 2022.

The 2021–22 season was the 97th season in the existence of FC Lokomotiv Moscow and the club's 26th consecutive season in the top flight of Russian football. In addition to the domestic league, Lokomotiv Moscow participated in this season's editions of the Russian Cup, the Russian Super Cup and the UEFA Europa League.

== Players ==
=== First-team squad ===
As of 14 March 2022

Note: Flags indicate national team as defined under FIFA eligibility rules; some limited exceptions apply. Players may hold more than one non-FIFA nationality.

No.	Pos.	Nation	Player
1	GK	RUS	Guilherme
2	DF	RUS	Dmitri Zhivoglyadov
4	DF	RUS	Stanislav Magkeyev
5	MF	RUS	Konstantin Maradishvili
6	MF	RUS	Dmitri Barinov
7	FW	NED	Gyrano Kerk
8	MF	FRA	Alexis Beka Beka
9	FW	CZE	Jan Kuchta
11	MF	RUS	Anton Miranchuk
16	DF	CRO	Tin Jedvaj
17	FW	RUS	Rifat Zhemaletdinov
18	DF	RUS	Mark Mampassi
19	FW	FRA	Wilson Isidor

No.	Pos.	Nation	Player
24	DF	RUS	Maksim Nenakhov
25	FW	GUI	François Kamano
31	DF	POL	Maciej Rybus
49	MF	RUS	Grigory Borisenko
53	GK	RUS	Daniil Khudyakov
60	GK	RUS	Andrey Savin
66	DF	RUS	Mikhail Ivankov
69	MF	RUS	Daniil Kulikov
71	DF	RUS	Nair Tiknizyan
73	MF	RUS	Maksim Petrov
75	MF	RUS	Sergei Babkin
90	MF	BLR	Kirill Zinovich
94	DF	RUS	Dmitri Rybchinsky

=== Out on loan ===
Note: Flags indicate national team as defined under FIFA eligibility rules; some limited exceptions apply. Players may hold more than one non-FIFA nationality.

No.	Pos.	Nation	Player
—	DF	RUS	Vitali Lystsov (at Akhmat Grozny)
—	DF	RUS	Yevgeny Morozov (at Volgar Astrakhan)
—	DF	RUS	Vladimir Sholokh (at Avangard Kursk)
—	DF	RUS	Aleksandr Silyanov (at Rostov)
—	MF	RUS	Ilya Berkovski (at Nizhny Novgorod)

No.	Pos.	Nation	Player
—	MF	RUS	Denis Faizullin (at Fakel Voronezh)
—	MF	RUS	Aleksei Mironov (at Orenburg)
—	MF	RUS	Nikolai Titkov (at Orenburg)
—	FW	RUS	Andrey Nikitin (at Fakel Voronezh)

== Pre-season and friendlies ==
Win Draw Loss Fixtures

23 June 2021 Friendly	Lokomotiv Moscow (Russia)	3–2	(Slovakia) Žilina	Austria
17:30 CEST (UTC+2)

26 June 2021 Friendly	Lokomotiv Moscow (Russia)	6–1	(Slovenia) Olimpija	Austria
17:30 CEST (UTC+2)

3 July 2021 Friendly	Rapid Wien (Austria)	0–0	(Russia) Lokomotiv Moscow	Pinkafeld, Austria
16:00 CEST (UTC+2)

5 July 2021 Friendly	Cracovia (Poland)	2–2	(Russia) Lokomotiv Moscow	Moravske Toplice, Slovenia
17:30 CEST (UTC+2)				Stadium: Moravski Stadion

7 July 2021 Friendly	Lokomotiv Moscow (Russia)	1–2	(Greece) Aris Thessaloniki	Austria
19:00 CEST (UTC+2)

9 July 2021 Friendly	Hartberg (Austria)	0–1	(Russia) Lokomotiv Moscow	Großpetersdorf, Austria
18:00 CEST (UTC+2)				Stadium: Elektro Unger Arena Großpetersdorf

11 July 2021 Friendly	Lokomotiv Moscow (Russia)	1–0	(Slovenia) Celje	Lebring, Austria
17:00 CEST (UTC+2)				Stadium: sanSirro Stadion Lebring

22 January 2022 Friendly	Lokomotiv Moscow (Russia)	1–1	(Czech Republic) Jablonec	San Pedro Alcántara, Spain
17:00 CET (UTC+1)				Stadium: Marbella Football Center

26 January 2022 Friendly	Lokomotiv Moscow (Russia)	3–2	(Czech Republic) Sparta Prague	San Pedro Alcántara, Spain
17:00 CET (UTC+1)				Stadium: Marbella Football Center

4 February 2022 Friendly	Malmö FF (Sweden)	1–1	(Russia) Lokomotiv Moscow	San Pedro Alcántara, Spain
16:00 CET (UTC+1)				Stadium: Marbella Football Center

10 February 2022 Friendly	Göteborg (Sweden)	2–4	(Russia) Lokomotiv Moscow	San Pedro Alcántara, Spain
16:00 CET (UTC+1)				Stadium: Marbella Football Center

19 February 2022 Friendly	Molde (Norway)	3–0	(Russia) Lokomotiv Moscow	San Pedro Alcántara, Spain
16:00 CET (UTC+1)				Stadium: Marbella Football Center

27 March 2022 Friendly	Khimki (Russia)	1–0	(Russia) Lokomotiv Moscow	Khimki, Russia
16:00 MSK (UTC+3)				Stadium: Rodina Stadium

== Competitions ==
=== Overall record ===
Competition	First match	Last match	Starting round	Final position	Record							
Competition	First match	Last match	Starting round	Final position	Pld	W	D	L	GF	GA	GD	Win %
Russian Premier League	24 July 2021	21 May 2022	Matchday 1	6th	30	13	9	8	43	39	+4	43.33
Russian Cup	3 March 2022		Round of 16	Round of 16	1	0	0	1	0	4	−4	0.00
Russian Super Cup	17 July 2021		Final	Runners-up	1	0	0	1	0	3	−3	0.00
UEFA Europa League	16 September 2021	9 December 2021	Group stage	Group stage	6	0	2	4	2	9	−7	0.00
Total					38	13	11	14	45	55	−10	34.21

Last updated: 21 May 2022
Source: Soccerway

=== Premier League ===
==== League table ====
Pos	Team	Pld	W	D	L	GF	GA	GD	Pts
4	Krasnodar	30	14	8	8	42	30	+12	50 (Note: Head-to-head points: Krasnodar 4, CSKA Moscow 1.)
5	CSKA Moscow	30	15	5	10	42	29	+13	50
6	Lokomotiv Moscow	30	13	9	8	43	39	+4	48
7	Akhmat Grozny	30	13	3	14	36	38	−2	42
8	Krylia Sovetov Samara	30	12	5	13	39	36	+3	41

Source: Premier Liga
Rules for classification: 1) Points; 2) Head-to-head points; 3) Head-to-head matches won; 4) Head-to-head goal difference; 5) Head-to-head goals scored; 6) Matches won; 7) Goal difference; 8) Goals scored; 9) 2020–21 position (not applicable to final standings); 10) Play-off.

==== Results summary ====
Overall								Home						Away					
Pld	W	D	L	GF	GA	GD	Pts	W	D	L	GF	GA	GD	W	D	L	GF	GA	GD
30	13	9	8	43	39	+4	48	9	2	4	25	17	+8	4	7	4	18	22	−4

Last updated: 21 May 2022.
Source: FBref

==== Results by round ====
Round	1	2	3	4	5	6	7	8	9	10	11	12	13	14	15	16	17	18	19	20	21	22	23	24	25	26	27	28	29	30
Ground	H	A	A	H	H	A	Н	A	A	H	A	H	А	A	Н	A	Н	H	A	H	H	A	H	A	A	H	A	H	H	A
Result	W	W	D	D	W	D	W	D	D	L	D	W	W	D	L	L	L	W	L	W	L	W	W	L	D	W	L	W	D	W
Position	3	3	4	5	3	4	3	2	3	4	5	4	2	4	4	4	6	6	6	6	6	5	6	6	6	6	6	6	6	6

Updated to match(es) played on 21 May 2022. Source: Premier Liga
A = Away; H = Home; W = Win; D = Draw; L = Loss

==== Matches ====
24 July 2021 1	Lokomotiv Moscow	3–1	Arsenal Tula	Moscow
20:00 MSK (UTC+3)	Kamano (yellow card) 45+1'; Zhemaletdinov 80', 86'; Smolov 89'	Report	Tkachyov 20'; Markov (yellow card) 57'; Sokol (yellow card) 36' (yellow-red card) 79'	Stadium: RZD Arena; Attendance: 0 Referee: Igor Panin

31 July 2021 2	CSKA Moscow	1–2	Lokomotiv Moscow	Moscow
17:30 MSK (UTC+3)	Bistrović 19'; Mukhin (yellow card) 23'; Tiknizyan (yellow card) 58'; Oblyakov (yellow card) 90+'	Report	Smolov 22'; Barinov (yellow card) 30'; Murilo (yellow card) 31'; Kulikov (yellow card) 43'; Zhemaletdinov 60'	Stadium: VEB Arena; Attendance: 1,980; Referee: Alexey Matyunin

6 August 2021 3	Ufa	1–1	Lokomotiv Moscow	Ufa
17:00 MSK (UTC+3)	Kamilov (yellow card) 15'; Cacintura (yellow card) 45+3'; Ivanov 45+8' (pen.); Agalarov (yellow card) 64'; Golubev (yellow card) 90+4'	Report	Barinov (yellow card) 22' (yellow-red card) 45+3'; Pablo (yellow card) 58'; Magkeyev (yellow card) 66'; Lisakovich 73'; Zé Luís (yellow card) 88'	Stadium: BetBoom Arena; Attendance: 746; Referee: Ivan Sidenkov

15 August 2021 4	Lokomotiv Moscow	1–1	Zenit Saint Petersburg	Moscow
17:30 MSK (UTC+3)	Jedvaj (yellow card) 19'; Rybus (yellow card) 34'; Kulikov (yellow card) 42'; Kamano (yellow card) 48'; Pablo (yellow card) 55'; Zé Luís (yellow card) 76'; Guilherme (yellow card) 83'; Smolov 90' (pen.)	Report	Kuzyayev (yellow card) 19' (yellow-red card) 50'; Sutormin 85' (pen.)	Stadium: RZD Arena; Attendance: 2,994; Referee: Sergei Karasev

22 August 2021 5	Lokomotiv Moscow	2–1	Krasnodar	Moscow
16:00 MSK (UTC+3)	Smolov 7', 33'; Lisakovich (yellow card) 14'; Zhemaletdinov (yellow card) 39'; Barinov (yellow card) 77'; Kulikov (yellow card) 90+3'	Report	Chernikov (yellow card) 61'; Córdoba 71'; Cabella (yellow card) 78'; Gazinsky (yellow card) 90+3'	Stadium: RZD Arena; Attendance: 2,914; Referee: Vitali Meshkov

27 August 2021 6	Dynamo Moscow	1–1	Lokomotiv Moscow	Moscow
19:00 MSK (UTC+3)	Szymański 41'; Szymański (yellow card) 47'	Report	Smolov 23'; Rybus (yellow card) 29'; Zhemaletdinov (yellow card) 33'; Barinov (yellow card) 64' (yellow-red card) 90+4'; Beka Beka (yellow card) 90+1'	Stadium: VTB Arena; Attendance: 2,697; Referee: Kirill Levnikov

11 September 2021 7	Lokomotiv Moscow	2–0	Krylia Sovetov	Moscow
14:00 MSK (UTC+3)	Tiknizyan (yellow card) 29'; Kamano 59', 79'; Zhivoglyadov (yellow card) 90+3'	Report	Chernov (yellow card) 64'; Yakuba (yellow card) 90+3'	Stadium: RZD Arena; Attendance: 2,559; Referee: Vasili Kazartsev

20 September 2021 8	Ural Yekaterinburg	0–0	Lokomotiv Moscow	Yekaterinburg
18:30 YEKT (UTC+5)	Bicfalvi (yellow card) 33'; Adamov (yellow card) 43'; Miškić (yellow card) 90+4'	Report	Kamano (yellow card) 90+4'; Jedvaj (yellow card) 90+4'	Stadium: Central Stadium; Attendance: 834; Referee: Aleksey Sukhoy

25 September 2021 9	Khimki	0–0	Lokomotiv Moscow	Khimki
14:00 MSK (UTC+3)	Ademi (yellow card) 33'; Sokolov (yellow card) 65'; Glushakov (yellow card) 90+3'	Report	Barinov (yellow card) 25'; Marinato (red card) 53'	Stadium: Arena Khimki; Attendance: 1,600; Referee: Aleksey Vladimirovich

3 October 2021 10	Lokomotiv Moscow	1–2	Rostov	Moscow
19:00 MSK (UTC+3)	Maradishvili 9'; Pablo (yellow card) 72'	Report	Kerk 31' (o.g.); Almqvist (yellow card) 68'; Bayramyan (yellow card) 70'; Poloz 88'; Pesyakov (yellow card) 90+1'	Stadium: RZD Arena; Attendance: 4,472; Referee: Pavel Kukuyan

16 October 2021 11	Rubin Kazan	2–2	Lokomotiv Moscow	Kazan
16:30 MSK (UTC+3)	Dreyer 36'; Talbi (yellow card) 39'; Onugkha 66'; Samoshnikov (yellow card) 75'	Report	Beka Beka (yellow card) 8'; Petrov (yellow card) 21'; Smolov 68'; Maradishvili (yellow card) 90+2'; Zhemaletdinov 90+4'	Stadium: Ak Bars Arena; Attendance: 4,511; Referee: Kirill Levnikov

25 October 2021 12	Lokomotiv Moscow	2–1	Sochi	Moscow
19:00 MSK (UTC+3)	Rybus (yellow card) 24'; Yurganov 41' (o.g.); Jedvaj 49'; Beka Beka (yellow card) 56'; Pablo (yellow card) 90+2'	Report	Noboa (yellow card) 30'; Prokhin (yellow card) 50'; Terekhov (yellow card) 69'; Joãozinho 90+3'	Stadium: RZD Arena; Attendance: 3,857; Referee: Vladislav Bezborodov

30 October 2021 13	Nizhny Novgorod	1–2	Lokomotiv Moscow	Nizhny Novgorod
19:00 MSK (UTC+3)	Berkovski 31'; Kalinsky (yellow card) 80'; Sinitsyn (yellow card) 90+2'; Suleymanov (yellow card) 90+3'	Report	Maradishvili (yellow card) 21'; Zhemaletdinov 38'; Anjorin (yellow card) 51'; Beka Beka (yellow card) 59'; Rybus (yellow card) 85'; Miladinovic 90+6' (o.g.)	Stadium: Nizhny Novgorod Stadium; Attendance: 2,912; Referee: Aleksei Vasilevich Sokhoi

7 November 2021 14	Spartak Moscow	1–1	Lokomotiv Moscow	Moscow
19:00 MSK (UTC+3)	Litvinov (yellow card) 11' (yellow-red card) 35'; Sobolev (yellow card) 36'; Bakayev (yellow card) 36'; Umyarov 64'	Report	Kerk 23'; Maradishvili (yellow card) 26'; Kulikov (yellow card) 30'; Kerk (yellow card) 45+1'; Zhivoglyadov (yellow card) 55'; Barinov (yellow card) 78'; Jedvaj (yellow card) 90' (yellow-red card) 90'	Stadium: Otkritie Arena; Attendance: 7,186; Referee: Ivan Sidenkov

20 November 2021 15	Lokomotiv Moscow	1–2	Akhmat Grozny	Moscow
16:30 MSK (UTC+3)	Murilo (red card) 35'; Kerk (yellow card) 43'; Pablo (yellow card) 63'; Lisakovich 64'; Guilherme (yellow card) 67'; Chyorny (yellow card) 89'; Kamano (yellow card) 90+2'	Report	Utkin 36'; Nižić (yellow card) 52'; Polyarus 58'; Lystsov (yellow card) 65'; Konovalov (yellow card) 67'	Stadium: RZD Arena; Attendance: 3,912; Referee: Sergey Ivanov

29 November 2021 16	Arsenal Tula	3–1	Lokomotiv Moscow	Tula
19:00 MSK (UTC+3)	Khlusevich 17'; Markov 40'; Markov 58'; Kostadinov (yellow card) 73'; Khlusevich (yellow card) 77'; Kambolov (yellow card) 84'	Report	Rybus (yellow card) 53'; Jedvaj (yellow card) 60'; Lisakovich (yellow card) 71'; Pablo 90+3'	Stadium: Arsenal Stadium; Referee: Vladimir Moskalev

4 December 2021 17	Lokomotiv Moscow	0–1	Ural Yekaterinburg	Moscow
19:00 MSK (UTC+3)	Rybus (yellow card) 31'; Jedvaj (yellow card) 40' (yellow-red card) 47'; Barinov (yellow card) 45+1'; Nenakhov (yellow card) 62'	Report	Gerasimov (yellow card) 7'; Augustyniak 42' (pen.); Yevseyev (yellow card) 69'; Kuzmichev (yellow card) 76'; Gagnidze (yellow card) 87'	Stadium: RZD Arena; Attendance: 3,336; Referee: Kirill Levnikov

12 December 2021 18	Lokomotiv Moscow	2–0	Ufa	Moscow
21:00 MSK (UTC+3)	Barinov (yellow card) 11'; Zinovich (yellow card) 31'; Babkin (yellow card) 41'; Maradishvili 71'; Kerk 74'	Report	Botaka (yellow card) 39'; Mrzljak (yellow card) 52'	Stadium: RZD Arena; Attendance: 3,225; Referee: Artem Lyubimov

6 March 2022 20	Lokomotiv Moscow	3–2	Khimki	Moscow
14:00 MSK (UTC+3)	Kerk 8'; Maradishvili (yellow card) 18'; Isidor 21', (yellow card) 48'; Kuchta 80'; Zhemaletdinov (penalty missed) 90+3'	Report	Lamkel Zé 6', 72', (yellow card) 81'; Viana (yellow card) 15' (yellow-red card) 42'; Zhirkov (yellow card) 29'; Bozhenov (yellow card) 35'; Volkov (yellow card) 84'	Stadium: RZD Arena; Attendance: 3,118; Referee: Artyom Lyubimov

12 March 2022 21	Lokomotiv Moscow	1–2	CSKA Moscow	Moscow
19:00 MSK (UTC+3)	Isidor 42'; Zhemaletdinov (yellow card) 77'	Report	Zaynutdinov (yellow card) 31'; Yazıcı 39'; Gbamin (yellow card) 41'; Dzagoev (yellow card) 89'; Fernandes 90+1'	Stadium: RZD Arena; Attendance: 11,178; Referee: Sergey Ivanov

19 March 2022 22	Akhmat Grozny	2–3	Lokomotiv Moscow	Grozny
16:30 MSK (UTC+3)	Shvets (yellow card) 2'; Troshechkin 20'; Timofeyev (yellow card) 39'; Utkin 45+3'; Konovalov (yellow card) 58'	Report	Zhemaletdinov 10', (yellow card) 37'; Kuchta (yellow card) 13', (goal) 62'; Kerk (yellow card) 27'; Mampassi (yellow card) 45'; Barinov (yellow card) 45+2'; Khudyakov (yellow card) 47'; Isidor 54'	Stadium: Akhmat-Arena; Attendance: 5,488; Referee: Vasily Kazartsev

2 April 2022 23	Lokomotiv Moscow	1–0	Spartak Moscow	Moscow
19:30 MSK (UTC+3)	Beka Beka (yellow card) 24'; Babkin (yellow card) 58'; Maradishvili (yellow card) 80'; Isidor 85', (yellow card) 90+1'	Report	Caufriez (yellow card) 48'	Stadium: RZD Arena; Attendance: 15,073; Referee: Sergei Karasev

10 April 2022 24	Rostov	4–1	Lokomotiv Moscow	Rostov-on-Don
19:30 MSK (UTC+3)	Osipenko (yellow card) 31', (goal) 43'; Shchetinin 34'; Poloz 61'; Komlichenko 70' (pen.)	Report	Isidor (yellow card) 31', (goal) 81' (pen.); Tiknizyan (red card) 37'; Zhivoglyadov (yellow card) 66'; Barinov (yellow card) 83'	Stadium: Rostov Arena; Attendance: 15,075; Referee: Yan Bobrovsky

17 April 2022 25	Sochi	2–2	Lokomotiv Moscow	Sochi
16:30 MSK (UTC+3)	Margasov 11', (yellow card) 90+1'; Rodrigão 43', (red card) 60'	Report	Isidor 36' (pen.), 49'; Kuchta (red card) 60'	Stadium: Fisht Olympic Stadium; Attendance: 6,255; Referee: Vasily Kazartsev

23 April 2022 26	Lokomotiv Moscow	2–1	Nizhny Novgorod	Moscow
16:30 MSK (UTC+3)	Zhivoglyadov (yellow card) 30'; Zhemaletdinov 37', 53', (yellow card) 81'; Rybus (yellow card) 76'; Barinov (yellow card) 88'	Report	Berkovski (red card) 72'; Kravtsov 77'; Kozlov (yellow card) 90+2'	Stadium: RZD Arena; Attendance: 7,315; Referee: Evgeny Turbin

30 April 2022 27	Zenit Saint Petersburg	3–1	Lokomotiv Moscow	Saint Petersburg
19:30 MSK (UTC+3)	Sergeyev 28'; Malcom 42'; Mostovoy 77'	Report	Kerk 4'; Mampassi (yellow card) 45+2'; Nenakhov (yellow card) 90'	Stadium: Krestovsky Stadium; Attendance: 47,584; Referee: Vladimir Moskalyov

4 May 2022 19	Krasnodar	1–0	Lokomotiv Moscow	Krasnodar
19:00 MSK (UTC+3)	Apekov (red card) 76'; Chernikov 83', (yellow card) 90' (yellow-red card) 90+5'	Report	Jedvaj (yellow card) 20'; Rybus (yellow card) 36'; Maradishvili (red card) 48'; Guilherme (yellow card) 70'	Stadium: Krasnodar Stadium; Attendance: 17,122; Referee: Artem Chistyakov
Note: The match was originally scheduled for 27 February 2022, but was postponed due to the local airport being shut by the Federal Air Transport Agency in relation to the Russian invasion of Ukraine. On 16 March 2022, it was rescheduled to 4 May.

8 May 2022 28	Lokomotiv Moscow	1–0	Rubin Kazan	Moscow
19:00 MSK (UTC+3)	Tiknizyan (yellow card) 43'; Miranchuk (yellow card) 84', (goal) 87' (pen.); Mampassi (yellow card) 90+2'	Report	Zuyev (yellow card) 75'; Ignatyev (yellow card) 86'	Stadium: RZD Arena; Attendance: 11,822; Referee: Kirill Levnikov

14 May 2022 29	Lokomotiv Moscow	3–3	Dynamo Moscow	Moscow
16:30 MSK (UTC+3)	Jedvaj 28', (yellow card) 37'; Kuchta 65'; Kerk 72'; Zhivoglyadov (yellow card) 74'	Report	Smolov 9'; Zakharyan 33'; Fomin 38' (pen.), (yellow card) 46'; Skopintsev (yellow card) 56'	Stadium: RZD Arena; Attendance: 14,915; Referee: Sergey Ivanov

21 May 2022 30	Krylia Sovetov	0–1	Lokomotiv Moscow	Samara
17:00 MSK (UTC+3)		Report	Zhemaletdinov 51'; Barinov (yellow card) 56'; Guilherme (yellow card) 70'; Kuchta (yellow card) 90+1'; Miranchuk (yellow card) 90+4'	Stadium: Solidarnost Arena; Referee: Vladislav Bezborodov

=== Russian Cup ===
3 March 2022 Round of 16	Lokomotiv Moscow	0–4	Yenisey Krasnoyarsk	Moscow
18:15 MSK (UTC+3)	Tiknizyan (yellow card) 27' (yellow-red card) 36'; Barinov (yellow card) 37'; Nenakhov (yellow card) 44'; Babkin (yellow card) 75'	Report	Kichin 25'; Lomakin 38' (pen.); Okladnikov 77'; Komkov 90+2'	Stadium: RZD Arena; Referee: Artem Chistyakov

=== Russian Super Cup ===
17 July 2021 Final	Zenit Saint Petersburg	3–0	Lokomotiv Moscow	Kaliningrad, Russia
19:00 MSK (UTC+3)	Kuzyayev 27'; Azmoun 57'; Yerokhin 83'; Mostovoy (yellow card) 87'; Kravtsov (yellow card) 90+3'	Report	Barinov (yellow card) 51'	Stadium: Kaliningrad Stadium; Attendance: 16,388; Referee: Pavel Kukuyan

=== UEFA Europa League ===
==== Group stage ====
The draw for the group stage was held on 27 August 2021.

Pos	Team	Pld	W	D	L	GF	GA	GD	Pts	Qualification	GAL	LAZ	MAR	LOK
1	(Turkey) Galatasaray	6	3	3	0	7	3	+4	12	Advance to round of 16	—	1–0	4–2	1–1
2	(Italy) Lazio	6	2	3	1	7	3	+4	9	Advance to knockout round play-offs	0–0	—	0–0	2–0
3	(France) Marseille	6	1	4	1	6	7	−1	7	Transfer to Europa Conference League	0–0	2–2	—	1–0
4	(Russia) Lokomotiv Moscow	6	0	2	4	2	9	−7	2		0–1	0–3	1–1	—

Source: UEFA
Rules for classification: Group stage tiebreakers

16 September 2021 1	Lokomotiv Moscow (Russia)	1–1	(France) Marseille	Moscow, Russia
20:45 MSK (UTC+3)	Beka Beka (yellow card) 22'; Tiknizyan (yellow card) 33' (yellow-red card) 59'; Anjorin 89'	Report	Kamara (yellow card) 37'; Ünder 59' (pen.); Rongier (yellow card) 62'	Stadium: RZD Arena; Attendance: 8,100; Referee: Irfan Peljto (Bosnia and Herzegovina)

30 September 2021 2	Lazio (Italy)	2–0	(Russia) Lokomotiv Moscow	Rome, Italy
21:00 CEST (UTC+2)	Bašić 13'; Patric 38'; Cataldi (yellow card) 45+2'; Lazzari (yellow card) 67'	Report	Beka Beka (yellow card) 47'; Rybchinsky (yellow card) 90+1'	Stadium: Stadio Olimpico; Attendance: 6,767; Referee: Craig Pawson (England)

21 October 2021 3	Lokomotiv Moscow (Russia)	0–1	(Turkey) Galatasaray	Moscow, Russia
22:00 MSK (UTC+3)	Barinov (yellow card) 70'	Report	Babel (yellow card) 36'; Antalyalı (yellow card) 43'; Mohamed (yellow card) 73'; Aktürkoğlu 82'; Moruțan (yellow card) 90'	Stadium: RZD Arena; Attendance: 8,100; Referee: Harald Lechner (Austria)

4 November 2021 4	Galatasaray (Turkey)	1–1	(Russia) Lokomotiv Moscow	Istanbul, Turkey
19:45 TRT (UTC+3)	Yedlin (yellow card) 8'; Feghouli 43'; Yılmaz (yellow card) 74'; Diagne (yellow card) 90+3'; Dervişoğlu (yellow card) 90+4'	Report	Nenakhov (yellow card) 14'; Jedvaj (yellow card) 36'; Kamano 72'; Rybchinsky (yellow card) 90+3'; Barinov (yellow card) 90+3'	Stadium: Nef Stadium; Attendance: 27,776; Referee: Sandro Schärer (Switzerland)

25 November 2021 5	Lokomotiv Moscow (Russia)	0–3	(Italy) Lazio	Moscow, Russia
20:45 MSK (UTC+3)	Kamano (yellow card) 1'; Nenakhov (yellow card) 14'; Silyanov (yellow card) 55'; Barinov (yellow card) 62'; Rybus (yellow card) 86'	Report	Zaccagni (yellow card) 21'; Luis Alberto (yellow card) 36'; Immobile 56' (pen.), 63' (pen.); Lucas (yellow card) 57'; Milinković-Savić (yellow card) 76'; Pedro 87'	Stadium: RZD Arena; Attendance: 8,100; Referee: Artur Soares Dias (Portugal)

9 December 2021 6	Marseille (France)	1–0	(Russia) Lokomotiv Moscow	Marseille, France
21:00 CET (UTC+1)	Gueye (yellow card) 18'; Milik 35'; Rongier (yellow card) 63' (yellow-red card) 80'	Report	Kamano (yellow card) 24'; Maradishvili (yellow card) 26'; Smolov (yellow card) 56'; Tiknizyan (yellow card) 87'	Stadium: Stade Vélodrome; Attendance: 42,614; Referee: Willie Collum (Scotland)

== Squad statistics ==
=== Goal scorers ===
As of 21 May 2022

Place	Position	Nation	Number	Name	Russian Premier League	Russian Cup	Russian Super Cup	UEFA Europa League	Total
1	FW	(Russia)	17	Rifat Zhemaletdinov	9	0	0	0	9
2	FW	(Russia)	9	Fyodor Smolov	7	0	0	0	7
2	MF	(France)	19	Wilson Isidor	7	0	0	0	7
4	MF, FW	(Netherlands)	7	Gyrano Kerk	1	0	0	0	1
5	MF, FW	(Guinea)	25	François Kamano	2	0	0	1	3
5	FW	(Czech Republic)	9	Jan Kuchta	3	0	0	0	3
7	FW	(Belarus)	88	Vitali Lisakovich	2	0	0	0	2
7	DF	(Croatia)	16	Tin Jedvaj	2	0	0	0	2
7	MF	(Russia)	5	Konstantin Maradishvili	2	0	0	0	2
10	MF, FW	(England)	10	Tino Anjorin	0	0	0	1	1
10	DF	(Brazil)	3	Pablo	1	0	0	0	1
10	FW	(Russia)	11	Anton Miranchuk	1	0	0	0	1
Total					41	0	0	2	43
