= 2021–22 FC Ufa season =

FC Ufa
2021–22 season
- Owner: Samara Oblast
- General director: Marat Magadeyev
- Head coach: Aleksei Stukalov
- Stadium: Neftyanik Stadium
- Premier League: 14th
- Relegation play-offs: Relegated vs Orenburg
- Russian Cup: Round of 32
- Top goalscorer: League: Gamid Agalarov (19); All: Gamid Agalarov (19)
- Highest home attendance: 8,877 vs CSKA Moscow (16 April 2022)
- Lowest home attendance: 409 vs Akhmat Grozny (31 October 2021)
- Average home league attendance: 2,760 (14 May 2022)
Home colours	Away colours	Third colours
- All statistics correct as of 18 April 2022.

The 2021–22 season was the 64th season in the existence of FC Ufa and the club's 19th & final consecutive season in the top flight of Russian football. In addition to the domestic league, FC Ufa were participated in this season's editions of the Russian Cup.

== Squad ==
As of match played 28 May 2022

No.	Name	Nationality	Position	Date of birth (age)	Signed from	Signed in	Contract ends	Apps.	Goals
Goalkeepers
31	Aleksandr Belenov	(Russia)	GK	13 September 1986 (age 40)	Anzhi Makhachkala	2017		165	0
32	Anton Chichkan	(Belarus)	GK	10 July 1995 (age 31)	BATE Borisov	2022	2024	6	0
81	Ivan Kukushkin	(Russia)	GK	24 July 2002 (age 24)	Zenit St.Petersburg	2021		0	0
Defenders
3	Konstantin Pliyev	(Russia)	DF	26 October 1996 (age 30)	Rostov	2021		52	0
4	Aleksei Nikitin	(Russia)	DF	27 January 1992 (age 34)	Amkar Perm	2015		136	5
5	Bojan Jokić	(Slovenia)	DF	17 May 1986 (age 40)	Villarreal	2017		137	5
11	Nemanja Miletić	(Serbia)	DF	26 July 1991 (age 35)	Olympiakos Nicosia	2021		19	1
15	Erving Botaka	(Russia)	DF	5 October 1998 (age 28)	Veles Moscow	2021		15	0
33	Aleksandr Sukhov	(Russia)	DF	3 January 1986 (age 40)	Shinnik Yaroslavl	2023		188	3
44	Yuri Zhuravlyov	(Russia)	DF	29 June 1996 (age 30)	Volgar Astrakhan	2021		30	3
Midfielders
6	Ruslan Fishchenko	(Russia)	MF	9 June 2000 (age 26)	Veles Moscow	2021		31	0
8	Danila Yemelyanov	(Russia)	MF	23 January 2000 (age 26)	Academy	2016		26	0
17	Oston Urunov	(Uzbekistan)	MF	19 December 2000 (age 25)	On loan from Spartak Moscow	2021		37	0
19	Oleg Ivanov	(Russia)	MF	4 August 1986 (age 40)	Akhmat Grozny	2021		35	3
22	Artyom Golubev	(Russia)	MF	21 January 1999 (age 27)	Krasnodar	2020		74	1
23	Egas Cacintura	(Angola)	MF	29 October 1997 (age 29)	Novaya Generatsiya	2021		30	0
24	Filip Mrzljak	(Russia)	MF	16 April 1993 (age 33)	Dinamo București	2020		43	4
25	Aleksandr Saplinov	(Russia)	MF	12 August 1997 (age 29)	on loan from Rostov	2021		20	0
29	Vladislav Kamilov	(Russia)	MF	29 August 1995 (age 31)	SKA-Khabarovsk	2020		51	7
Forwards
7	Dmitri Kabutov	(Russia)	FW	26 March 1992 (age 34)	Krylia Sovetov	2022		13	1
9	Gamid Agalarov	(Russia)	FW	16 July 2000 (age 26)	Anzhi Makhachkala	2020		43	20
57	Vyacheslav Krotov	(Russia)	FW	14 February 1993 (age 33)	Spartak Moscow	2015		167	14
75	Timur Zhamaletdinov	(Russia)	FW	21 May 1997 (age 29)	CSKA Moscow	2020		38	7
94	Danil Akhatov	(Russia)	FW	22 December 2003 (age 22)	Academy	2021		3	0
99	Dilan Ortiz	(Colombia)	FW	15 March 2000 (age 26)	on loan from Proleter Novi Sad	2022		13	1
Out on loan
	Aleksey Kuznetsov	(Russia)	GK	20 August 1996 (age 30)	Dynamo Bryansk	2021		2	0
	Oleg Dzantiyev	(Russia)	DF	9 March 1999 (age 27)	Olimp-Dolgoprudny	2021		1	0
	Nikita Belousov	(Russia)	MF	26 February 2002 (age 24)	Academy	2018		3	0
Left during the season
7	Azer Aliyev	(Russia)	MF	12 May 1994 (age 32)	Tambov	2021		66	2
8	Parfait Bizoza	(Burundi)	MF	3 March 1999 (age 27)	Aalesunds	2021		11	0
12	Boli Bolingoli-Mbombo	(Belgium)	DF	1 July 1995 (age 31)	on loan from Celtic	2022	2022	0	0
20	Tiago Rodrigues	(Portugal)	MF	29 January 1992 (age 34)	Al-Hazem	2022		4	0
32	Moritz Bauer	(Switzerland)	DF	25 January 1992 (age 34)	Stoke City	2021		18	0
	Jemal Tabidze	(Georgia (country))	DF	18 March 1996 (age 30)	Gent	2017		90	1

=== Out on loan ===
Note: Flags indicate national team as defined under FIFA eligibility rules; some limited exceptions apply. Players may hold more than one non-FIFA nationality.

No.	Pos.	Nation	Player
—	GK	RUS	Aleksey Kuznetsov (at Veles Moscow)
—	DF	RUS	Oleg Dzantiyev (at SKA Rostov-on-Don)

No.	Pos.	Nation	Player
—	MF	RUS	Nikita Belousov (at Spartak Tuymazy)

== Transfers ==
=== In ===
Date	Position	Nationality	Name	From	Fee	Ref.
22 May 2021	DF	(Russia)	Yuri Zhuravlyov	Volgar Astrakhan	Undisclosed	
11 June 2021	DF	(Russia)	Erving Botaka	Veles Moscow	Undisclosed	
11 June 2021	MF	(Russia)	Ruslan Fishchenko	Veles Moscow	Undisclosed	
24 June 2021	GK	(Russia)	Aleksey Kuznetsov	Dynamo Bryansk	Undisclosed	
29 June 2021	DF	(Austria)	Moritz Bauer	Stoke City	Undisclosed	
30 June 2021	MF	(Russia)	Azer Aliyev	Tambov	Undisclosed	
23 July 2021	MF	(Angola)	Egas Cacintura	Novaya Generatsiya futsal	Undisclosed	
17 January 2022	GK	(Belarus)	Anton Chichkan	BATE Borisov	Undisclosed	
6 February 2022	FW	(Russia)	Dmitri Kabutov	Krylia Sovetov	Free	
5 February 2022	MF	(Portugal)	Tiago Rodrigues	Al-Hazem	Undisclosed	

=== Loans in ===
Date from	Position	Nationality	Name	From	Date to	Ref.
24 June 2021	MF	(Russia)	Aleksandr Saplinov	Rostov	End of season	
21 January 2022	FW	(Colombia)	Dilan Ortiz	Proleter Novi Sad	End of season	
22 February 2022	DF	(Belgium)	Boli Bolingoli-Mbombo	Celtic	1 April 2022	

=== Out ===
Date	Position	Nationality	Name	To	Fee	Ref.
9 June 2021	MF	(Russia)	Nikolai Giorgobiani	Alania Vladikavkaz	Undisclosed	
14 July 2021	DF	(Russia)	Pavel Alikin	Rodina Moscow	Undisclosed	
16 July 2021	GK	(Russia)	Aleksey Chernov	Vejle	Undisclosed	
28 August 2021	MF	(Burundi)	Parfait Bizoza	Vendsyssel	Undisclosed	
25 January 2022	DF	(Austria)	Moritz Bauer	Servette	Undisclosed	

=== Loans out ===
Date from	Position	Nationality	Name	To	Date to	Ref.
9 June 2021	MF	(Russia)	Danila Yemelyanov	Neftekhimik Nizhnekamsk	29 December 2021	
17 June 2021	MF	(Russia)	Nikita Belousov	Shinnik Yaroslavl	16 August 2021	
16 August 2021	MF	(Russia)	Nikita Belousov	Spartak Tuymazy	End of season	
9 February 2022	GK	(Russia)	Aleksey Kuznetsov	Veles Moscow	End of season	
9 February 2022	DF	(Russia)	Oleg Dzantiyev	SKA Rostov-on-Don	End of season	

=== Released ===
Date	Position	Nationality	Name	Joined	Date	Ref
30 June 2021	MF	(Russia)	Igor Bezdenezhnykh	Kuban Krasnodar		
13 August 2021	MF	(Russia)	Dmitri Sysuyev	Saransk		
27 January 2022	MF	(Russia)	Azer Aliyev	Neftçi	27 January 2022	
30 March 2022	DF	(Georgia (country))	Jemal Tabidze			
15 April 2022	MF	(Portugal)	Tiago Rodrigues			

== Pre-season and friendlies ==
Win Draw Loss Fixtures

== Competitions ==
=== Overview ===
Competition	First match	Last match	Starting round	Final position	Record							
Competition	First match	Last match	Starting round	Final position	Pld	W	D	L	GF	GA	GD	Win %
Premier League	25 July 2021	21 May 2022	Matchday 1	14th	30	6	12	12	28	39	−11	20.00
Relegation play-offs	25 May 2022	28 May 2022	1st leg	Relegated	2	0	1	1	3	4	−1	0.00
Russian Cup	22 September 2021	27 October 2021	Group stage	Group stage	2	0	1	1	1	3	−2	0.00
Total					34	6	14	14	32	46	−14	17.65

Last updated: 28 May 2022
Source: Soccerway

=== Premier League ===
==== League table ====
Pos	Team	Pld	W	D	L	GF	GA	GD	Pts	Qualification or relegation
12	Ural Yekaterinburg	30	8	9	13	27	35	−8	33 (Note: Head-to-head points: Nizhny Novgorod 4, Ural Yekaterinburg 1.)	
13	Khimki (O)	30	7	11	12	34	47	−13	32	Qualification for the relegation play-offs
14	Ufa (R)	30	6	12	12	29	40	−11	30	Qualification for the relegation play-offs
15	Rubin Kazan (R)	30	8	5	17	34	56	−22	29	Relegation to First League
16	Arsenal Tula (R)	30	5	8	17	30	59	−29	23	Relegation to First League

Source: Premier Liga
Rules for classification: 1) Points; 2) Head-to-head points; 3) Head-to-head matches won; 4) Head-to-head goal difference; 5) Head-to-head goals scored; 6) Matches won; 7) Goal difference; 8) Goals scored; 9) 2020–21 position (not applicable to final standings); 10) Play-off.
(O) Play-off winners; (R) Relegated

==== Results summary ====
Overall								Home						Away					
Pld	W	D	L	GF	GA	GD	Pts	W	D	L	GF	GA	GD	W	D	L	GF	GA	GD
30	6	12	12	29	40	−11	30	3	8	4	16	17	−1	3	4	8	13	23	−10

Last updated: 21 May 2022.
Source: FBref

==== Results by round ====
Round	1	2	3	4	5	6	7	8	9	10	11	12	13	14	15	16	17	18	19	20	21	22	23	24	25	26	27	28	29	30
Ground	A	H	H	A	H	H	A	H	А	H	А	H	Н	А	А	H	A	A	A	A	H	H	A	H	H	A	A	H	H	A
Result	L	L	D	W	D	L	L	W	L	L	D	D	W	D	D	D	L	L	L	L	D	D	W	L	D	L	D	D	W	W
Position	8	13	12	11	11	14	14	12	12	15	16	15	13	12	12	13	15	15	15	15	15	15	16	15	14	15	15	15	15	14

Updated to match(es) played on 21 May 2022. Source: Premier Liga
A = Away; H = Home; W = Win; D = Draw; L = Loss

==== Results ====
25 July 2021 1	CSKA Moscow	1 – 0	Ufa	Moscow
22:00 YEKT (UTC+5)	Zabolotny 61'	Report		Stadium: VEB Arena; Attendance: 938; Referee: Sergey Ivanov

31 July 2021 2	Ufa	2 – 3	Dynamo Moscow	Ufa
19:30 YEKT (UTC+5)	Krotov (yellow card) 20'; Miletić (yellow card) 40'; Bauer (yellow card) 47'; Fishchenko (yellow card) 74' (yellow-red card) 75'; Agalarov 81', 86'	Report	Fomin 33' (pen.), 41' (pen.); Parshivlyuk (yellow card) 35'; Szymański (yellow card) 77' (goal) 89'; Balbuena (yellow card) 78'	Stadium: BetBoom Arena; Attendance: 669; Referee: Alexey Sukhoi

6 August 2021 3	Ufa	1 – 1	Lokomotiv Moscow	Ufa
19:00 YEKT (UTC+5)	Kamilov (yellow card) 15'; Cacintura (yellow card) 45+3'; Ivanov 45+8' (pen.); Agalarov (yellow card) 64'; Golubev (yellow card) 90+4'	Report	Barinov (yellow card) 22' (yellow-red card) 45+3'; Pablo (yellow card) 58'; Magkeyev (yellow card) 66'; Lisakovich 73'; Zé Luís (yellow card) 88'	Stadium: BetBoom Arena; Attendance: 746; Referee: Ivan Sidenkov

14 August 2021 4	Nizhny Novgorod	1 – 2	Ufa	Nizhny Novgorod
19:30 YEKT (UTC+5)	Gorbunov (yellow card) 14'; Kecskés 57'; Nigmatullin (yellow card) 63'; Masoero (yellow card) 76' Suleymanov (yellow card) 90+'	Report	Kamilov (yellow card) 24'; Agalarov 48'; Cacintura (yellow card) 61'; Ivanov 65' (pen.) (yellow card) 90+'; Mrzljak (yellow card) 75'	Stadium: Nizhny Novgorod Stadium; Attendance: 482; Referee: Vasiliy Kazartsev

21 August 2021 5	Ufa	1–1	Zenit St.Petersburg	Ufa
18:00 YEKT (UTC+5)	Cacintura (yellow card) 29'; Fishchenko (yellow card) 62'; Agalarov 74'; Pliyev (yellow card) 81'; Zhuravlyov (yellow card) 90+'	Report	Malcom 10'	Stadium: BetBoom Arena; Attendance: 761; Referee: Pavel Shadykhanov

26 August 2021 6	Ufa	1 – 2	Krylia Sovetov	Ufa
18:30 YEKT (UTC+5)	Mrzljak (yellow card) 24'; Agalarov 61' (pen.) (yellow card) 77'	Report	Chernov 28'; Glushenkov 29'; Yezhov (red card) 60'	Stadium: BetBoom Arena; Attendance: 594; Referee: Vladislav Bezborodov

12 September 2021 7	Sochi	3 – 1	Ufa	Sochi
18:30 YEKT (UTC+5)	Margasov (yellow card) 6'; Cassierra 11'; Noboa 35'; Barać (yellow card) 59'; Terekhov (yellow card) 89'; Joãozinho 90+3'	Report	Agalarov 50'; Zhuravlyov (red card) 83'	Stadium: Fisht Olympic Stadium; Attendance: 498; Referee: Aleksey Sukhoy

18 September 2021 8	Ufa	3 – 2	Khimki	Ufa
17:00 YEKT (UTC+5)	Agalarov 52', 82' (yellow card) 90+2'; Kamilov 62'; Saplinov (yellow card) 81'	Report	Troshechkin (yellow card) 9'; Glushakov 44', 90+1' (pen.)	Stadium: BetBoom Arena; Attendance: 493; Referee: Pavel Kukuyan

25 September 2021 9	Spartak Moscow	2–0	Ufa	Moscow
21:00 YEKT (UTC+5)	Ponce 3'; Promes 29'	Report	Krotov (yellow card) 18'; Kamilov (yellow card) 19'; Mrzljak (yellow card) 54'; Golubev (yellow card) 68'	Stadium: Otkritie Arena; Attendance: 6,898; Referee: Artem Lyubimov

3 October 2021 10	Ufa	0 – 1	Ural Yekaterinburg	Ufa
16:00 YEKT (UTC+5)	Ivanov (yellow card) 8'; Nikitin (yellow card) 90+2'	Report	Bicfalvi 34' (yellow card) 38'; Miškić (yellow card) 68'	Stadium: BetBoom Arena; Attendance: 679; Referee: Vitali Meshkov

17 October 2021 11	Krasnodar	1 – 1	Ufa	Krasnodar
21:00 YEKT (UTC+5)	Spajić (yellow card) 58'; Sorokin (yellow card) 62'; Krychowiak 84' (pen.)	Report	Agalarov 9'; Kamilov (yellow card) 75'; Zhuravlyov (yellow card) 84'; Mrzljak (yellow card) 90+'	Stadium: Krasnodar Stadium; Attendance: 10,554; Referee: Alexey Sukhoi

24 October 2021 12	Ufa	1 – 1	Rubin Kazan	Ufa
16:00 YEKT (UTC+5)	Agalarov 19' (pen.); Urunov (yellow card) 29'; Cacintura (yellow card) 47'; Aliyev (yellow card) 90+'; Pliyev (yellow card) 90+'	Report	Abildgaard (yellow card) 12'; Zhuravlyov 59' (o.g.)	Stadium: BetBoom Arena; Attendance: 454; Referee: Igor Panin

31 October 2021 13	Ufa	1 – 0	Akhmat Grozny	Ufa
16:00 YEKT (UTC+5)	Lystsov (yellow card) 50'; Agalarov 58'; Urunov (yellow card) 72'	Report	Mrzljak (yellow card) 44'; Timofeyev (yellow card) 72'; Sebai (yellow card) 90+'	Stadium: BetBoom Arena; Attendance: 409; Referee: Alexey Amelin

6 November 2021 14	Arsenal Tula	0 – 0	Ufa	Tula
16:00 YEKT (UTC+5)	Kambolov (yellow card) 16'; Tkachyov (yellow card) 36'; Radaković (yellow card) 45'	Report	Fishchenko (yellow card) 1' (yellow-red card) 18'	Stadium: Arsenal Stadium; Attendance: 1,652; Referee: Kirill Levnikov

21 November 2021 15	Rostov	2 – 2	Ufa	Rostov-on-Don
16:00 YEKT (UTC+5)	Poloz 21' (pen.); Hadžikadunić (yellow card) 55'; Bayramyan (yellow card) 55'; Almqvist 59'; Sukhomlinov (yellow card) 83'	Report	Botaka (yellow card) 13'; Agalarov 15', 57' (pen.); Mrzljak (yellow card) 25'	Stadium: Rostov Arena; Attendance: 4,989; Referee: Evgeny Kukulyak

29 November 2021 16	Ufa	1–1	Spartak Moscow	Ufa
19:00 YEKT (UTC+5)	Krotov (yellow card) 37'; Zhuralev (yellow card) 38'; Kamilov (yellow card) 45+3'; Mrzljak (yellow card) 54'; Jokić (yellow card) 67'; Nikitin 71' (yellow card) 90+3'; Aliyev (yellow card) 88'	Report	Ayrton (yellow card) 19'; Umayrov (yellow card) 43'; Rasskazov (yellow card) 74' (yellow-red card) 86'	Stadium: BetBoom Arena; Attendance: 1,325; Referee: Pavel Kukuyan

5 December 2021 17	Dynamo Moscow	2 – 0	Ufa	Moscow
18:30 YEKT (UTC+5)	Makarov 29'; Grulyov (yellow card) 45+3'; Zakharyan 86'	Report	Krotov (red card) 6'; Cacintura (red card) 36'; Botaka (yellow card) 75'; Belenov (yellow card) 81'	Stadium: VTB Arena; Attendance: 7,437; Referee: Vladislav Bezborodov

12 December 2021 18	Lokomotiv Moscow	2 – 0	Ufa	Moscow
21:00 YEKT (UTC+5)	Barinov (yellow card) 11'; Zinovich (yellow card) 31'; Babkin (yellow card) 41'; Maradishvili 71'; Kerk 74'	Report	Botaka (yellow card) 39'; Mrzljak (yellow card) 52'	Stadium: RZD Arena; Attendance: 3,225; Referee: Artem Lyubimov

27 February 2022 19	Akhmat Grozny	2 – 1	Ufa	Grozny
21:00 YEKT (UTC+5)	Utkin (yellow card) 9'; Konovalov 51' (pen.); Semyonov (yellow card) 67'; Troshechkin 84'	Report	Jokić (yellow card) 27'; Fishchenko (yellow card) 29'; Zhuravlyov 45+1'; Cacintura (yellow card) 49'; Kamilov (yellow card) 54'; Agalarov (yellow card) 67'; Rodrigues (yellow card) 68'	Stadium: Akhmat-Arena; Attendance: 6,612; Referee: Aleksey Sukhoi

6 March 2022 20	Zenit St.Petersburg	2–0	Ufa	Saint Petersburg
18:30 YEKT (UTC+5)	Krugovoy 50'; Claudinho (yellow card) 53'; Malcom 67'	Report	Kamilov (yellow card) 87'	Stadium: Krestovsky Stadium; Attendance: 24,377; Referee: Sergey Ivanov

12 March 2022 21	Ufa	0 – 0	Nizhny Novgorod	Ufa
16:00 YEKT (UTC+5)	Rodrigues (yellow card) 45'; Kabutov (yellow card) 67' (yellow-red card) 90+'; Zhuravlyov (yellow card) 82'	Report	Kravtsov (yellow card) 67'; Yuldoshev (yellow card) 73'	Stadium: BetBoom Arena; Attendance: Vladislav Bezborodov; Referee: 1,602

20 March 2022 22	Ufa	1 – 1	Krasnodar	Ufa
16:00 YEKT (UTC+5)	Botaka (yellow card) 38'; Ortiz (yellow card) 58'; Fishchenko (yellow card) 73'; Agalarov 84' (pen.)	Report	Ionov 45+'; Chernikov (yellow card) 75'; Sorokin (yellow card) 90+'	Stadium: BetBoom Arena; Attendance: 4,570; Referee: Pavel Shadykhanov

2 April 2022 23	Krylia Sovetov	1 – 2	Ufa	Samara
16:00 YEKT (UTC+5)	Fernando (yellow card) 18' (goal) 68'; Bijl (yellow card) 80'	Report	Zhuravlyov 12'; Ortiz (yellow card) 55'; Nikitin (yellow card) 73'; Agalarov 87' (yellow card) 90+'	Stadium: Solidarnost Arena; Attendance: 7,927; Referee: Artyom Chistyakov

10 April 2022 24	Ufa	1 – 2	Sochi	Ufa
16:00 YEKT (UTC+5)	Cacintura (yellow card) 72'; Agalarov 81' (pen.)	Report	Cassierra 12'; Drkušić (yellow card) 41'; Yusupov 51'	Stadium: BetBoom Arena; Attendance: 6,866; Referee: Alexey Amelin

16 April 2022 25	Ufa	1 – 1	CSKA Moscow	Ufa
16:00 YEKT (UTC+5)	Jokić (yellow card) 19'; Ortiz (yellow card) 60'; Nikitin 90+'	Report	Shchennikov (yellow card) 55'; Fernandes 88'	Stadium: BetBoom Arena; Attendance: 8,877; Referee: Evgeny Turbin

23 April 2022 26	Ural Yekaterinburg	2 – 1	Ufa	Yekaterinburg
16:00 YEKT (UTC+5)	Miškić (yellow card) 13' (goal) 53'; Bicfalvi 25'; Podberyozkin (yellow card) 56'; Yemelyanov (yellow card) 82'; Ageyev (yellow card) 90+'	Report	Jokić (yellow card) 68'; Agalarov 80'	Stadium: Central Stadium; Attendance: 10,172; Referee: Sergey Ivanov

1 May 2022 27	Khimki	1 – 1	Ufa	Khimki
18:30 YEKT (UTC+5)	Šabović (yellow card) 7'; Nabiullin (red card) 12'; Kukharchuk 31'; Idowu (yellow card) 49'; Bozhenov (yellow card) 79'; Filin (yellow card) 90+'	Report	Ortiz (yellow card) 54'; Agalarov 90+' (pen.) (yellow card) FT; Urunov (yellow card) 90+'	Stadium: Arena Khimki; Attendance: 2,580; Referee: Kirill Levnikov

8 May 2022 28	Ufa	0 – 0	Rostov	Ufa
16:00 YEKT (UTC+5)	Ivanov (yellow card) 15'; Jokić (yellow card) 81' (yellow-red card) 85'	Report	Poloz (penalty missed) 8'; Glebov (yellow card) 15'; Melyokhin (yellow card) 53'; Komlichenko (yellow card) 73'	Stadium: BetBoom Arena; Attendance: 7,277; Referee: Pavel Kukuyan

14 May 2022 29	Ufa	2 – 1	Arsenal Tula	Ufa
16:00 YEKT (UTC+5)	Kabutov 13' (yellow card) 90+'; Agalarov 76'	Report	Smolnikov (yellow card) 24'; K.Kangwa 25'; E.Kangwa (yellow card) 40' (yellow-red card) 72'; Kostadinov (yellow card) 45'	Stadium: BetBoom Arena; Attendance: 6,077; Referee: Vitali Meshkov

21 May 2022 30	Rubin Kazan	1 – 2	Ufa	Kazan
19:00 YEKT (UTC+5)	Lisakovich 37' (penalty missed) 90+ Kuchayev (yellow card) 81'; Teslenko (yellow card) 85'	Report	Jokić (yellow card) 36'; Kamilov 54'; Ivanov (yellow card) 68'; Agalarov (yellow card) 84'; Ortiz 90'	Stadium: Ak Bars Arena; Attendance: 25,142; Referee: Sergey Ivanov

==== Relegation play-offs ====
25 May 2020 1st Leg	Orenburg	2 – 2	Ufa	Orenburg
19:30 YEKT (UTC+5)	Malykh (yellow card) 65'; Titkov (yellow card) 66'; Gojković 70'; Sychevoy (yellow card) 79'; Malykh 84'; Oyevole (red card) 90+'	Report	Agalarov 19' (pen.); Cacintura (yellow card) 31'; Kamilov 61' (pen.); Mrzljak (yellow card) 72'; Zhuravlyov (yellow card) 83'	Stadium: Gazovik Stadium; Referee: Vladislav Bezborodov

28 May 2022 2nd Leg	Ufa	1 – 2 (3 – 4 agg.)	Orenburg	Ufa
18:00 YEKT (UTC+5)	Cacintura (yellow card) 38'; Zhuravlyov 44' (yellow card) 52'; Kamilov (yellow card) 57'; Pliyev (yellow card) 64'; Ortiz (yellow card) 72'	Report	Fameyeh 13'; Malykh (yellow card) 60' (goal) 90+4'; Titkov (yellow card) 80'; Sivakow (yellow card) 90+'	Stadium: BetBoom Arena; Referee: Pavel Kukuyan

=== Russian Cup ===
==== Round of 32 ====
Pos	Team	Pld	W	PW	PL	L	GF	GA	GD	Pts	Final result
1	Alania Vladikavkaz (2) (Q)	2	2	0	0	0	5	2	+3	6	Advance to Play-off
2	Ufa (1)	2	0	1	0	1	1	3	−2	2	
3	Legion Dynamo (3)	2	0	0	1	1	3	4	−1	1	

Rules for classification: 1) Points; 2) Wins; 3) Goal differential; 4) Goals scored; 5) Head-to-head result; 6) Disciplinary points.
(Q) Qualified to the phase indicated

22 September 2021 2	Legion Dynamo	1–1 (0–2 p)	Ufa	Makhachkala
17:00 YEKT (UTC+5)	Saaduev 60' (pen.); A.Panayev (yellow card) 77'; K.Kurbanov (yellow card) 89'	Report	Golubev (yellow card) 58' Nikitin (yellow card) 59' (goal) 90+4'	Stadium: Dynamo Stadium; Referee: Aleksey Koltunov
	Penalties
	Murtazaliyev (penalty missed); Udunyan (penalty missed); Magomedov (penalty missed); Panayev (penalty missed)		(penalty scored) Aliyev; (penalty missed) Kamilov; (penalty scored) Krotov

27 October 2021 3	Alania Vladikavkaz	2–0	Ufa	Grozny
19:00 YEKT (UTC+5)	Kobesov 55' (pen.); Khadartsev 70'	Report	Jokić (yellow card) 45+2' (yellow-red card) 76'	Stadium: Sultan Bilimkhanov Stadium; Referee: Sergey Cheban

== Squad statistics ==
As of match played 28 May 2022

=== Appearances and goals ===
No.	Pos	Nat	Player	Total		Premier League		Relegation play-offs		Russian Cup	
No.	Pos	Nat	Player	Apps	Goals	Apps	Goals	Apps	Goals	Apps	Goals
3	DF	(Russia) RUS	Konstantin Pliyev	32	0	24+4	0	2	0	2	0
4	DF	(Russia) RUS	Aleksei Nikitin	27	3	18+5	2	2	0	0+2	1
5	DF	(Slovenia) SLO	Bojan Jokić	29	0	26	0	1+1	0	0+1	0
6	MF	(Russia) RUS	Ruslan Fishchenko	31	0	20+7	0	1+1	0	0+2	0
7	FW	(Russia) RUS	Dmitri Kabutov	13	1	10+1	1	2	0	0	0
8	MF	(Russia) RUS	Danila Yemelyanov	9	0	1+7	0	0+1	0	0	0
9	FW	(Russia) RUS	Gamid Agalarov	33	20	27+2	19	2	1	2	0
11	DF	(Serbia) SRB	Nemanja Miletić	9	0	5+3	0	0	0	1	0
15	DF	(Russia) RUS	Erving Botaka	15	0	11+2	0	0	0	2	0
17	MF	(Uzbekistan) UZB	Oston Urunov	17	0	8+8	0	1	0	0	0
19	MF	(Russia) RUS	Oleg Ivanov	25	2	13+10	2	1	0	1	0
22	MF	(Russia) RUS	Artyom Golubev	24	0	6+16	0	0+1	0	1	0
23	MF	(Angola) ANG	Egas Cacintura	30	0	18+9	0	2	0	0+1	0
24	MF	(Croatia) CRO	Filip Mrzljak	27	0	19+4	0	1+1	0	2	0
25	MF	(Russia) RUS	Aleksandr Saplinov	20	0	3+16	0	0	0	0+1	0
29	MF	(Russia) RUS	Vladislav Kamilov	30	3	18+8	2	2	1	2	0
31	GK	(Russia) RUS	Aleksandr Belenov	27	0	27	0	0	0	0	0
32	GK	(Belarus) BLR	Anton Chichkan	6	0	3+1	0	2	0	0	0
33	DF	(Russia) RUS	Aleksandr Sukhov	12	0	5+3	0	1+1	0	1+1	0
44	DF	(Russia) RUS	Yuri Zhuravlyov	30	3	24+2	2	2	1	2	0
57	FW	(Russia) RUS	Vyacheslav Krotov	27	0	21+4	0	0	0	1+1	0
75	FW	(Russia) RUS	Timur Zhamaletdinov	6	0	1+4	0	0+1	0	0	0
94	FW	(Russia) RUS	Danil Akhatov	3	0	0+2	0	0	0	0+1	0
99	FW	(Colombia) COL	Dilan Ortiz	13	1	5+6	1	0+2	0	0	0
Players away from the club on loan:
1	GK	(Russia) RUS	Aleksey Kuznetsov	2	0	0	0	0	0	2	0
Players who appeared for Ufa but left during the season:
7	MF	(Russia) RUS	Azer Aliyev	15	0	7+6	0	0	0	2	0
8	MF	(Burundi) BDI	Parfait Bizoza	2	0	0+2	0	0	0	0	0
20	MF	(Portugal) POR	Tiago Rodrigues	4	0	4	0	0	0	0	0
32	DF	(Austria) AUT	Moritz Bauer	10	0	6+3	0	0	0	1	0

=== Goal scorers ===
Place	Position	Nation	Number	Name	Premier League	Relegation play-offs	Russian Cup	Total
1	FW	(Russia)	9	Gamid Agalarov	19	1	0	20
2	MF	(Russia)	29	Vladislav Kamilov	2	1	0	3
2	DF	(Russia)	44	Yuri Zhuravlyov	2	1	0	3
2	DF	(Russia)	4	Aleksei Nikitin	2	0	1	3
5	MF	(Russia)	19	Oleg Ivanov	2	0	0	2
6	FW	(Russia)	7	Dmitri Kabutov	1	0	0	1
6	FW	(Colombia)	99	Dilan Ortiz	1	0	0	1
Total					29	3	1	33

=== Clean sheets ===
Place	Position	Nation	Number	Name	Premier League	Relegation play-offs	Russian Cup	Total
1	GK	(Russia)	31	Aleksandr Belenov	3	0	0	3
2	GK	(Belarus)	32	Anton Chichkan	1	0	0	1
Total					4	0	0	4

=== Disciplinary record ===
Number	Nation	Position	Name	Premier League		Relegation play-offs		Russian Cup		Total	
Number	Nation	Position	Name	Yellow card	Red card	Yellow card	Red card	Yellow card	Red card	Yellow card	Red card
3	(Russia)	DF	Konstantin Pliyev	2	0	1	0	0	0	3	0
4	(Russia)	DF	Aleksei Nikitin	3	0	0	0	1	0	4	0
5	(Slovenia)	DF	Bojan Jokić	7	1	0	0	2	1	9	2
6	(Russia)	MF	Ruslan Fishchenko	7	2	0	0	0	0	7	2
7	(Russia)	MF	Dmitri Kabutov	3	1	0	0	0	0	3	1
9	(Russia)	FW	Gamid Agalarov	7	0	0	0	0	0	7	0
11	(Serbia)	DF	Nemanja Miletić	1	0	0	0	0	0	1	0
15	(Russia)	DF	Erving Botaka	4	0	0	0	0	0	4	0
17	(Uzbekistan)	MF	Oston Urunov	4	0	0	0	0	0	4	0
19	(Russia)	MF	Oleg Ivanov	4	0	0	0	0	0	4	0
22	(Russia)	MF	Artyom Golubev	2	0	0	0	1	0	3	0
23	(Angola)	MF	Egas Cacintura	6	1	2	0	0	0	8	1
24	(Croatia)	MF	Filip Mrzljak	9	0	1	0	0	0	10	0
25	(Russia)	FW	Aleksandr Saplinov	1	0	0	0	0	0	1	0
29	(Russia)	MF	Vladislav Kamilov	7	0	1	0	0	0	8	0
31	(Russia)	GK	Aleksandr Belenov	1	0	0	0	0	0	1	0
44	(Russia)	DF	Yuri Zhuravlyov	4	1	2	0	0	0	6	1
57	(Russia)	FW	Vyacheslav Krotov	3	1	0	0	0	0	3	1
99	(Colombia)	FW	Dilan Ortiz	4	0	1	0	0	0	5	0
Players away on loan:
Players who left Ufa during the season:
7	(Russia)	MF	Azer Aliyev	2	0	0	0	0	0	2	0
20	(Portugal)	MF	Tiago Rodrigues	2	0	0	0	0	0	2	0
32	(Austria)	DF	Moritz Bauer	1	0	0	0	0	0	1	0
Total				84	7	8	0	4	1	96	8
