= Ruslan Fishchenko =

Russian footballer

Personal information
- Full name: Ruslan Ilgarovich Fishchenko
- Date of birth: 9 June 2000 (age 26)
- Place of birth: Moscow, Russia
- Height: 1.85 m (6 ft 1 in)
- Position: Defensive midfielder

Team information
- Current team: Rodina Moscow
- Number: 6

Youth career
- –2017: CSKA Moscow
- 2018–2019: Rostov

Senior career*
Years	Team	Apps	(Gls)
2019–2021	Veles Moscow	51	(0)
2021–2022	Ufa	45	(0)
2023–	Rodina Moscow	97	(0)
2024	→ Chernomorets Novorossiysk (loan)	12	(0)
- * Club domestic league appearances and goals as of 24 October 2026

Ruslan Ilgarovich Fishchenko (Russian: Руслан Ильгарович Фищенко; born 9 June 2000) is a Russian football player who plays as a defensive midfielder for Rodina Moscow.

== Club career ==
He played 5 games in the 2017–18 UEFA Youth League for CSKA Moscow.

He made his debut in the Russian Football National League for Veles Moscow on 1 August 2020 in a game against Tekstilshchik Ivanovo, as a starter.

On 11 June 2021, he signed a long-term contract with Russian Premier League club Ufa, reuniting with his former Veles coach Aleksei Stukalov. He made his RPL debut for Ufa on 25 July 2021 in a game against CSKA Moscow.

== Career statistics ==
As of 24 October 2026

Club	Season	League			Cup		Other		Total	
Club	Season	Division	Apps	Goals	Apps	Goals	Apps	Goals	Apps	Goals
Veles Moscow	2019–20	Russian Second League	12	0	2	0	–		14	0
Veles Moscow	2020–21	Russian First League	39	0	2	0	–		41	0
Veles Moscow	Total		51	0	4	0	0	0	55	0
Ufa	2021–22	Russian Premier League	27	0	2	0	2 (Note: Appearances in relegation play-offs)	0	31	0
Ufa	2022–23	Russian First League	18	0	3	0	–		21	0
Ufa	Total		45	0	5	0	2	0	52	0
Rodina Moscow	2022–23	Russian First League	13	0	–		2 (Note: Appearances in promotion play-offs)	0	15	0
Rodina Moscow	2023–24	Russian First League	25	0	3	0	–		28	0
Rodina Moscow	2024–25	Russian First League	20	0	0	0	–		20	0
Rodina Moscow	2025–26	Russian First League	29	0	0	0	–		29	0
Rodina Moscow	2026–27	Russian Premier League	10	0	2	0	–		12	0
Rodina Moscow	Total		97	0	5	0	2	0	104	0
Chernomorets Novorossiysk (loan)	2024–25	Russian First League	12	0	1	0	–		13	0
Career total			205	0	15	0	4	0	224	0
