= Erving Botaka =

Russian footballer

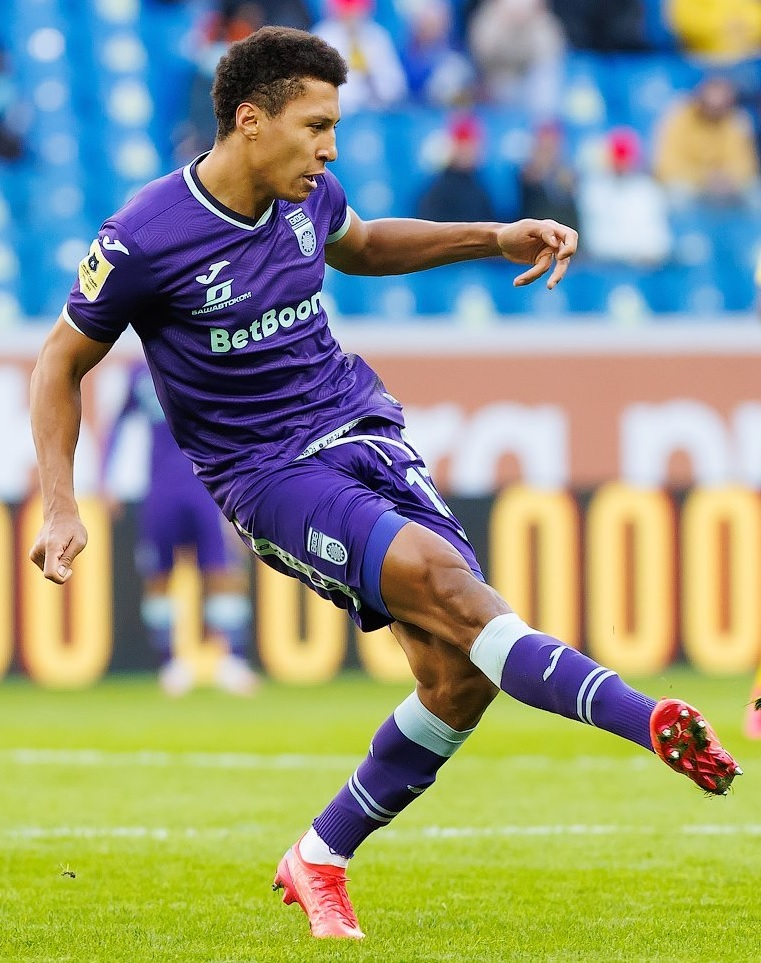
- Botaka with FC Ufa in 2021

Personal information
- Full name: Erving Dzho Botaka-Ioboma
- Date of birth: 5 October 1998 (age 28)
- Place of birth: Pushkino, Russia
- Height: 1.84 m (6 ft 0 in)
- Position: Centre-back

Team information
- Current team: Leningradets
- Number: 3

Youth career
- –2013: Lokomotiv Moscow
- 2013–2015: Torpedo Moscow

Senior career*
Years	Team	Apps	(Gls)
2016–2017	Solyaris Moscow	16	(0)
2017–2018	Kazanka Moscow	8	(0)
2018	Samgurali Tskaltubo	6	(0)
2019	Veles Moscow	6	(0)
2019	Luch Vladivostok	11	(0)
2020–2021	Veles Moscow	38	(3)
2021–2023	Ufa	48	(2)
2023–2026	Arsenal Tula	59	(1)
2026–	Leningradets	0	(0)

International career^{‡}
2020	Russia U20	2	(0)
- * Club domestic league appearances and goals as of 16 May 2026 ‡ National team caps and goals as of 11 June 2021

Erving Dzho Botaka-Ioboma (Russian: Эрвинг Джо Ботака-Иобома; born 5 October 1998) is a Russian footballer who plays as a centre-back for Leningradets.

== Club career ==
He made his debut in the Russian Professional Football League for FC Solyaris Moscow on 20 July 2016 in a game against FSK Dolgoprudny.

In July 2018 his failed transfer back to Torpedo Moscow caused a stir when it was reported the club canceled his contract because the ultras refused to allow a black footballer to play for the club. Torpedo later denied this via an official statement but the Torpedo ultras were adamant with their own statement.

He made his Russian Football National League debut for Luch Vladivostok on 24 July 2019 in a game against FC Neftekhimik Nizhnekamsk.

On 11 June 2021, he signed a long-term contract with Russian Premier League club Ufa, reuniting with his former Veles coach Aleksei Stukalov. He made his RPL debut for Ufa on 18 September 2021 in a game against FC Khimki.

== Career statistics ==
As of 28 May 2022

Club	Season	League			Cup		Continental		Other		Total	
Club	Season	Division	Apps	Goals	Apps	Goals	Apps	Goals	Apps	Goals	Apps	Goals
Solyaris Moscow	2016–17	PFL	16	0	0	0	–		–		16	0
Kazanka Moscow	2017–18	PFL	8	0	–		–		5 (Note: Appearances in the FNL Cup)	0	13	0
Samgurali Tsqaltubo	2018	Erovnuli Liga 2	6	0	–		–		2 (Note: Appearances in the relegation play-offs)	0	8	0
Veles Moscow	2018–19	PFL	6	0	–		–		–		6	0
Luch Vladivostok	2019–20	FNL	11	0	3	0	–		–		14	0
Veles Moscow	2019–20	PFL	–		–		–		–		0	0
Veles Moscow	2020–21	FNL	38	3	2	0	–		–		40	3
Veles Moscow	Total		44	3	2	0	0	0	0	0	46	3
Ufa	2021–22	RPL	13	0	2	0	–		–		15	0
Career total			100	13	0	0	0	0	1	0	101	13
