= Aleksey Kuznetsov (footballer) =

Russian footballer

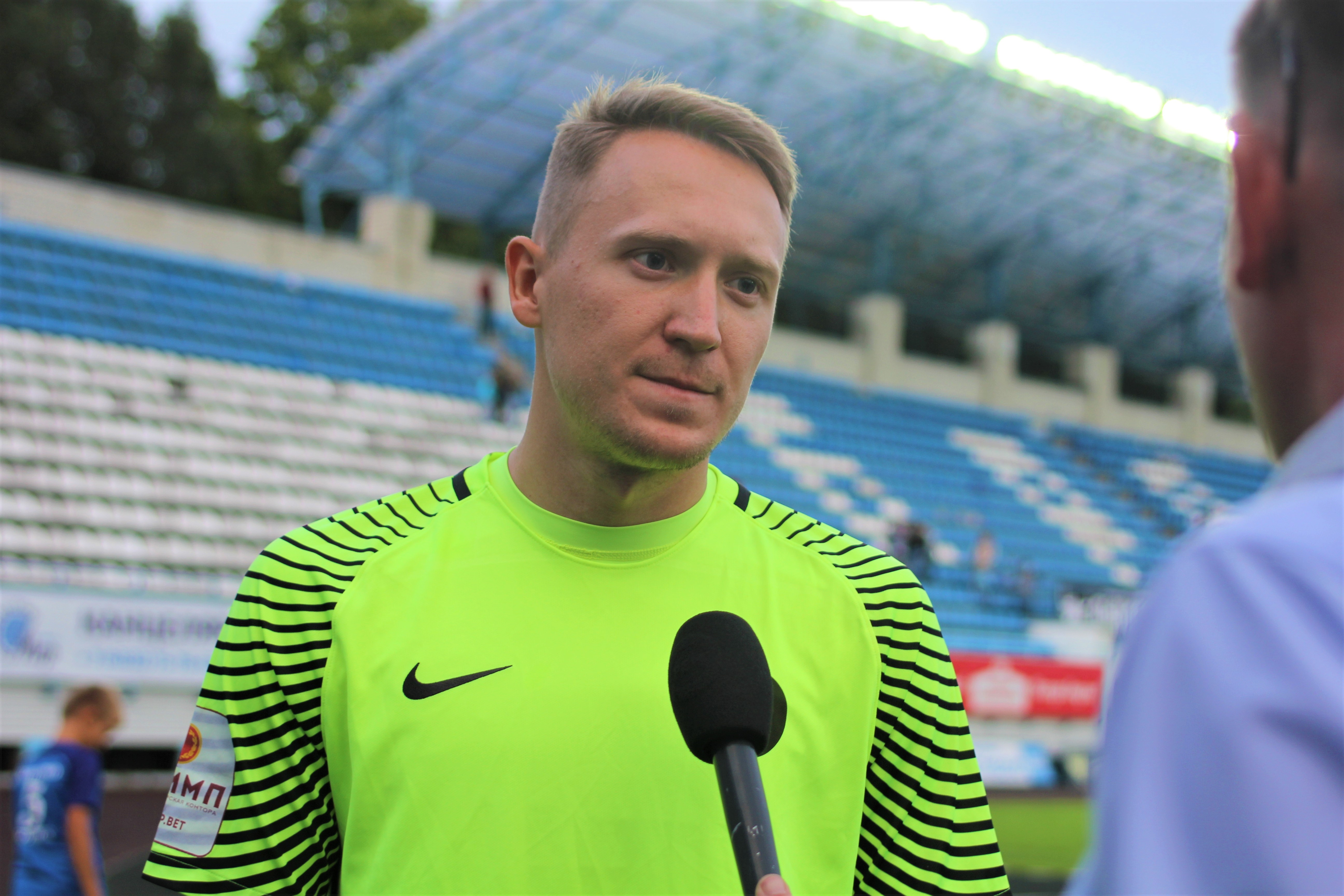
- Kuznetsov in 2019

Personal information
- Full name: Aleksey Igorevich Kuznetsov
- Date of birth: 20 August 1996 (age 30)
- Place of birth: Bryansk, Russia
- Height: 1.89 m (6 ft 2 in)
- Position: Goalkeeper

Team information
- Current team: FC Leningradets Leningrad Oblast
- Number: 96

Youth career
- Chertanovo Education Center

Senior career*
Years	Team	Apps	(Gls)
2014–2015	FC Chertanovo Moscow	22	(0)
2015–2016	FC Volga Nizhny Novgorod	0	(0)
2016	FC Zimbru Chișinău	0	(0)
2017–2021	FC Dynamo Bryansk	103	(0)
2021–2022	FC Ufa	0	(0)
2022	→ FC Veles Moscow (loan)	12	(0)
2022–2024	FC Veles Moscow	25	(0)
2024–2026	FC SKA-Khabarovsk	24	(0)
2026–	FC Leningradets Leningrad Oblast	0	(0)

International career^{‡}
2012	Russia U-16	1	(0)
2013	Russia U-17	2	(0)
2014	Russia U-18	4	(0)
2015	Russia U-21	1	(0)
- * Club domestic league appearances and goals as of 16 May 2026 ‡ National team caps and goals as of 19 January 2015

Aleksey Igorevich Kuznetsov (Russian: Алексей Игоревич Кузнецов; born 20 August 1996) is a Russian football player who plays for FC Leningradets Leningrad Oblast.

== Club career ==
He made his debut in the Russian Football National League for FC Dynamo Bryansk on 1 August 2020 in a game against FC Orenburg.

On 24 June 2021, he signed a long-term contract with Russian Premier League club FC Ufa. On 9 February 2022, Kuznetsov was loaned to FC Veles Moscow.

== International career ==
He was included in the Russian squad for the 2013 UEFA European Under-17 Championship (which Russia won) and 2013 FIFA U-17 World Cup, but remained on the bench in all games.

== Career statistics ==
As of 12 December 2021

Club	Season	League			Cup		Continental		Total	
Club	Season	Division	Apps	Goals	Apps	Goals	Apps	Goals	Apps	Goals
Chertanovo Moscow	2014–15	PFL	22	0	–		–		22	0
Volga Nizhny Novgorod	2015–16	FNL	0	0	0	0	–		0	0
Zimbru Chișinău	2016–17	Divizia Națională	0	0	–		–		0	0
Dynamo Bryansk	2017–18	PFL	25	0	3	0	–		28	0
Dynamo Bryansk	2018–19	PFL	24	0	1	0	–		25	0
Dynamo Bryansk	2019–20	PFL	17	0	0	0	–		17	0
Dynamo Bryansk	2020–21	FNL	37	0	0	0	–		37	0
Dynamo Bryansk	Total		103	0	4	0	0	0	107	0
Ufa	2021–22	RPL	0	0	2	0	–		2	0
Career total			125	0	6	0	0	0	131	0
