= Nikita Belousov =

Russian footballer (born 2002)

Personal information
- Full name: Nikita Leonidovich Belousov
- Date of birth: 26 February 2002 (age 24)
- Place of birth: Tuymazy, Russia
- Height: 1.71 m (5 ft 7 in)
- Position: Defensive midfielder

Senior career*
Years	Team	Apps	(Gls)
2018–2024	FC Ufa	10	(1)
2019–2020	→ FC Ufa-2	15	(0)
2021	→ FC Shinnik Yaroslavl (loan)	1	(0)
2021–2022	→ FC Spartak Tuymazy (loan)	22	(1)
2022–2023	→ FC Irtysh Omsk (loan)	4	(0)
- * Club domestic league appearances and goals as of 30 March 2024

Nikita Leonidovich Belousov (Russian: Никита Леонидович Белоусов; born 26 February 2002) is a Russian football player who plays as a defensive midfielder.

== Club career ==
He made his debut in the Russian Premier League for FC Ufa on 22 July 2020 in a game against FC Arsenal Tula, as a starter.

On 17 June 2021, he joined FC Shinnik Yaroslavl on loan. His Shinnik loan was terminated on 16 August 2021, and he joined his hometown team FC Spartak Tuymazy on loan instead.
