= Yuri Zhuravlyov (footballer) =

Russian footballer

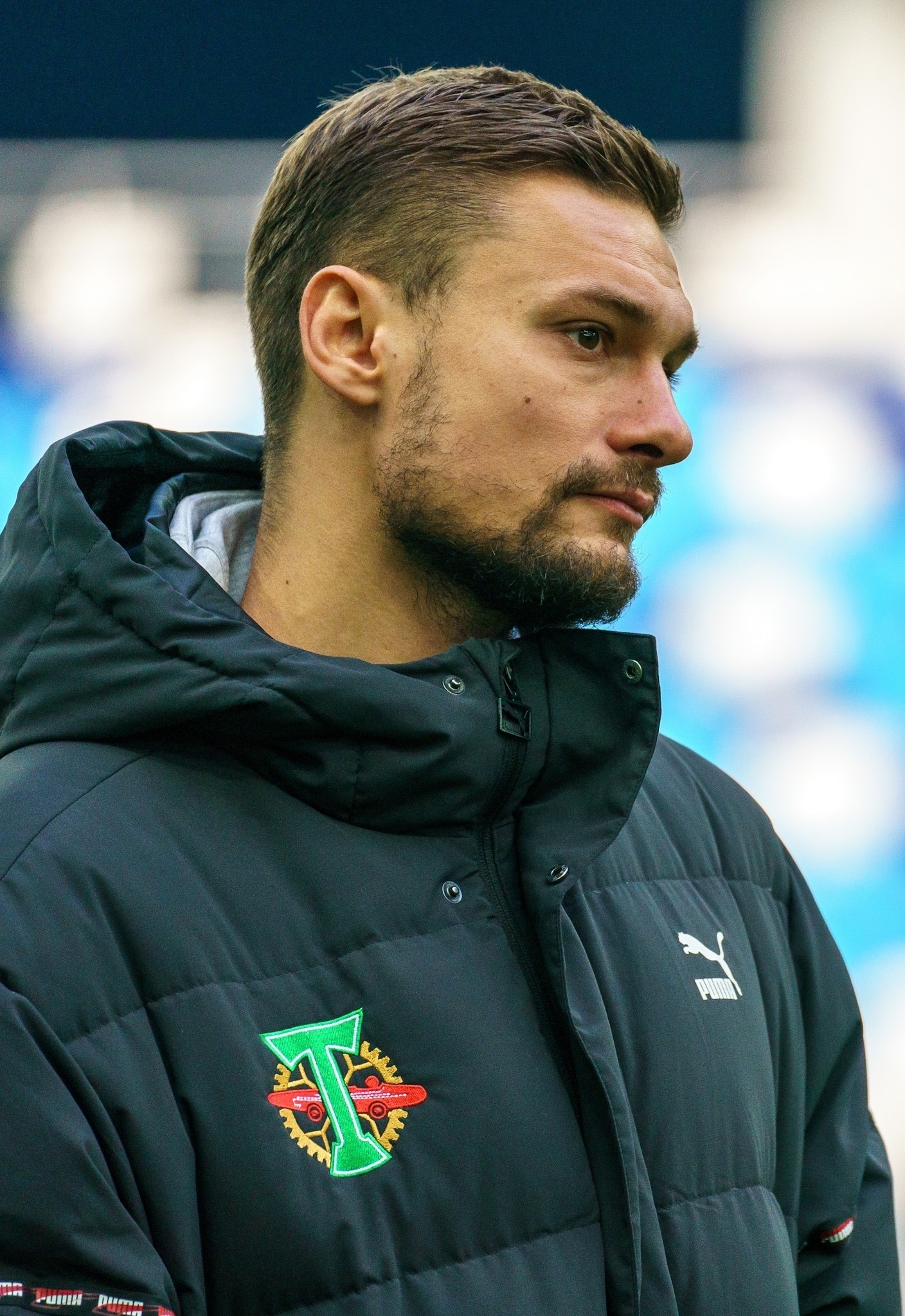
- Zhuravlyov with Torpedo Moscow in 2023

Personal information
- Full name: Yuri Igorevich Zhuravlyov
- Date of birth: 29 June 1996 (age 30)
- Place of birth: Kropotkin, Krasnodar Krai, Russia
- Height: 1.90 m (6 ft 3 in)
- Positions: Centre-back; left-back

Team information
- Current team: Fakel Voronezh
- Number: 44

Youth career
- 2003–2005: DYuSSH-1 Kropotkin
- 2008–2015: Kuban Krasnodar

Senior career*
Years	Team	Apps	(Gls)
2015–2017	Kuban Krasnodar	0	(0)
2016–2017	→ Kuban-2 Krasnodar	41	(4)
2018	Kubanskaya Korona (amateur)		
2018–2021	Volgar Astrakhan	87	(3)
2021–2022	Ufa	26	(2)
2022	Akhmat Grozny	12	(1)
2023–2024	Torpedo Moscow	13	(1)
2023	→ Torpedo-2	6	(0)
2024	→ Khimki (loan)	9	(1)
2024–2025	SKA-Khabarovsk	31	(1)
2025–	Fakel Voronezh	34	(1)

International career
2014	Russia U-18	4	(0)
- * Club domestic league appearances and goals as of 10 October 2026

Yuri Igorevich Zhuravlyov (Russian: Юрий Игоревич Журавлёв; born 29 June 1996) is a Russian football player who plays as a centre-back or a left-back for Fakel Voronezh.

== Club career ==
He made his debut for the main squad of Kuban Krasnodar on 23 September 2015 in a Russian Cup game against Shinnik Yaroslavl.

On 22 May 2021, he signed a long-term contract with Russian Premier League club Ufa. He made his RPL debut for FC Ufa on 25 July 2021 in a game against CSKA Moscow.

On 8 June 2022, Zhuravlyov joined Akhmat Grozny on a three-year contract.

On 20 December 2022, Zhuravlyov moved to Torpedo Moscow on a long-term contract.

In February 2024, Zhuravlyov moved on loan to Khimki until the end of 2024.

== Career statistics ==
As of 27 October 2026

Club	Season	League			Cup		Other		Total	
Club	Season	Division	Apps	Goals	Apps	Goals	Apps	Goals	Apps	Goals
Tosno	2014–15	Russian First League	–		–		1 (Note: Appearance in FNL Cup)	0	1	0
Kuban Krasnodar	2015–16	Russian Premier League	0	0	1	0	–		1	0
Kuban Krasnodar	2016–17	Russian First League	0	0	1	0	–		1	0
Kuban Krasnodar	2017–18	Russian First League	0	0	1	0	–		1	0
Kuban Krasnodar	Total		0	0	3	0	0	0	3	0
Kuban-2 Krasnodar	2016–17	Russian Second League	26	4	–		–		26	4
Kuban-2 Krasnodar	2017–18	Russian Second League	15	0	–		–		15	0
Kuban-2 Krasnodar	Total		41	4	0	0	0	0	41	4
Volgar Astrakhan	2018–19	Russian Second League	28	1	4	1	–		32	2
Volgar Astrakhan	2019–20	Russian Second League	18	1	2	0	–		20	1
Volgar Astrakhan	2020–21	Russian First League	41	1	1	0	–		42	1
Volgar Astrakhan	Total		87	3	7	1	0	0	94	4
Ufa	2021–22	Russian Premier League	26	3	2	0	2 (Note: Appearances in relegation play-offs)	1	30	4
Akhmat Grozny	2022–23	Russian Premier League	12	1	5	0	–		17	1
Torpedo Moscow	2022–23	Russian Premier League	3	0	1	0	–		4	0
Torpedo Moscow	2023–24	Russian First League	10	1	1	0	–		11	1
Torpedo Moscow	Total		13	1	2	0	0	0	15	1
Torpedo-2	2023	Russian Second League B	6	0	–		–		6	0
Khimki (loan)	2023–24	Russian First League	9	1	1	0	–		10	1
SKA-Khabarovsk	2024–25	Russian First League	31	1	1	0	–		32	1
Fakel Voronezh	2025–26	Russian First League	28	1	2	0	–		30	1
Fakel Voronezh	2026–27	Russian Premier League	6	0	3	0	–		9	0
Fakel Voronezh	Total		34	1	5	0	0	0	39	1
Career total			259	15	26	1	3	1	288	17
