= Grigory Borisenko =

Russian footballer

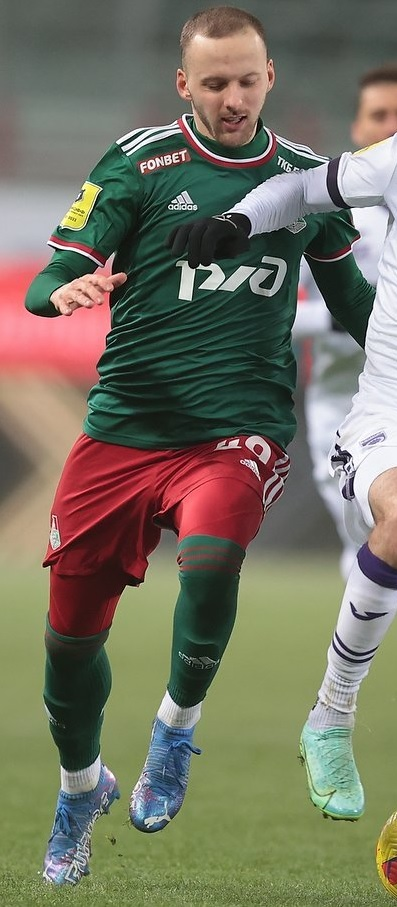
- Borisenko with Lokomotiv Moscow in 2021

Personal information
- Full name: Grigory Olegovich Borisenko
- Date of birth: 15 April 2002 (age 24)
- Place of birth: Moscow, Russia
- Height: 1.81 m (5 ft 11 in)
- Position: Midfielder

Youth career
- Lokomotiv Moscow

Senior career*
Years	Team	Apps	(Gls)
2021–2022	Kazanka Moscow	25	(2)
2021–2022	Lokomotiv Moscow	3	(0)
2022–2023	Baltika Kaliningrad	8	(1)
2022–2023	Baltika-BFU Kaliningrad	13	(0)
2023	KAMAZ Naberezhnye Chelny	14	(1)
2024–2025	Metallurg Lipetsk	24	(2)
2025–2026	Torpedo Miass	47	(3)

International career^{‡}
2017	Russia U15	4	(1)
2017–2018	Russia U16	11	(2)
2018	Russia U17	2	(0)
- * Club domestic league appearances and goals as of 13 June 2026 ‡ National team caps and goals as of 21 August 2018

Grigory Olegovich Borisenko (Russian: Григорий Олегович Борисенко; born 15 April 2002) is a Russian football player who plays as a right winger.

== Club career ==
He made his debut in the Russian Premier League for Lokomotiv Moscow on 20 November 2021 in a game against Akhmat Grozny. He made his European debut on 25 November 2021 in an Europa League game against Lazio.

== Career statistics ==
As of 8 June 2024

Club	Season	League			Cup		Continental		Total	
Club	Season	Division	Apps	Goals	Apps	Goals	Apps	Goals	Apps	Goals
Kazanka Moscow	2020–21	Russian Second League	6	0	–		–		6	0
Kazanka Moscow	2021–22	Russian Second League	19	2	–		–		19	2
Kazanka Moscow	Total		25	2	0	0	0	0	25	2
Lokomotiv Moscow	2021–22	Russian Premier League	3	0	0	0	1 (Note: Appearance in the UEFA Europa League)	0	4	0
Baltika Kaliningrad	2022–23	Russian First League	8	1	1	0	–		9	1
Baltika-BFU Kaliningrad	2022–23	Russian Second League	13	0	–		–		13	0
KAMAZ Naberezhnye Chelny	2023–24	Russian First League	14	1	2	0	–		16	1
Metallurg Lipetsk	2023–24	Russian Second League A	15	0	–		–		15	0
Career total			78	4	3	0	1	0	82	4
