= Sergei Tomarov =

Russian footballer and coach

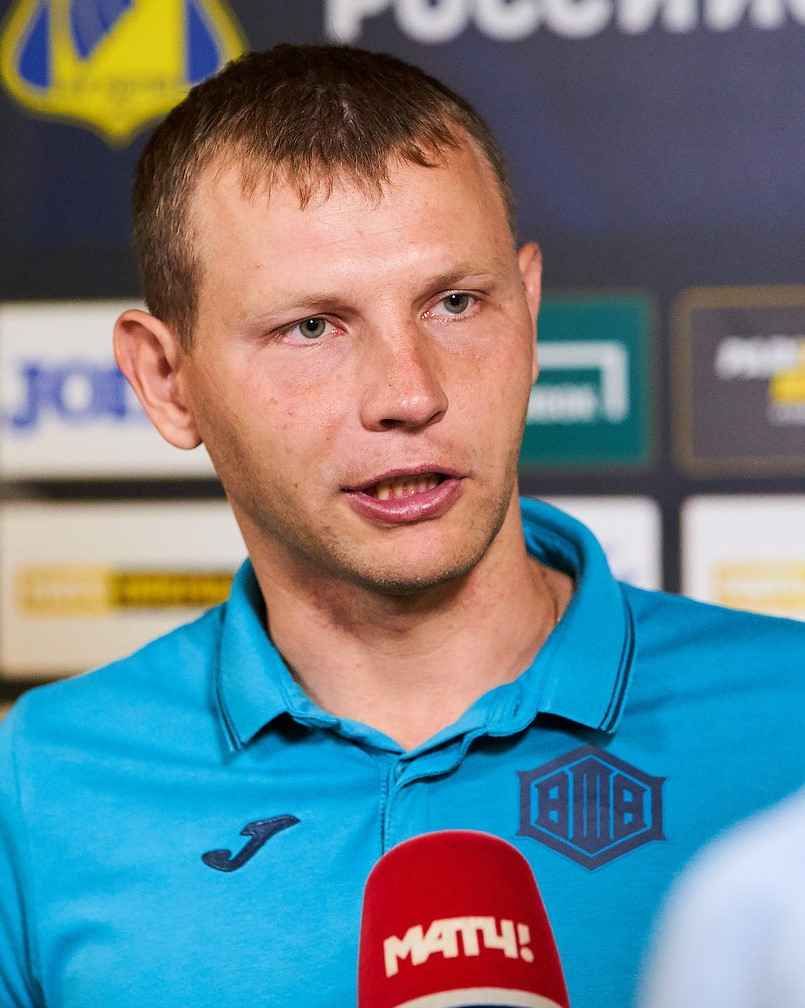
- Tomarov coaching FC Ufa in 2018

Personal information
- Full name: Sergei Aleksandrovich Tomarov
- Date of birth: 25 May 1982 (age 44)
- Place of birth: Meleuz, Russian SFSR
- Position: Forward

Team information
- Current team: Dynamo Makhachkala (assistant coach)

Senior career*
Years	Team	Apps	(Gls)
2000	Stroitel Ufa (amateur)		
2000	Belorechye Kushnarenkovo		
2000	Khimik Meleuz (amateur)		
2001	Neftemash Ishimbay		
2004	Neftyanik Ufa	4	(0)

Managerial career
- 2011–2014: Ufa (assistant)
- 2014–2015: Ufa (reserves)
- 2015–2018: Ufa (assistant)
- 2016: Ufa (caretaker)
- 2018: Ufa
- 2019–2020: Ufa (assistant)
- 2020–2022: Ufa (academy)
- 2022: Ufa
- 2022–2023: Ufa (academy)
- 2023: Fakel Voronezh (assistant)
- 2023–2024: Kuban Krasnodar (assistant)
- 2024: Ural Yekaterinburg (assistant)
- 2025: Ural Yekaterinburg
- 2025: Ural Yekaterinburg (assistant)
- 2025–: Dynamo Makhachkala (assistant)
- * Club domestic league appearances and goals

Sergei Aleksandrovich Tomarov (Russian: Сергей Александрович Томаров; born 25 May 1982) is a Russian football coach and a former player. He is an assistant coach with Dynamo Makhachkala.

== Coaching career ==
On 13 June 2018, he signed a 3-year contract as the manager of FC Ufa. He resigned from Ufa with team in 15th place on 7 November 2018.

On 15 June 2022, Tomarov was appointed as a caretaker manager of Ufa.
