= Dilan Ortiz =

Colombian footballer (born 2000)

Dilan Ortíz
Personal information
- Full name: Dilan Andrés Ortíz Aragón
- Date of birth: 15 March 2000 (age 26)
- Place of birth: Popayán, Colombia
- Height: 1.91 m (6 ft 3 in)
- Position: Forward

Team information
- Current team: Ufa
- Number: 70

Youth career
- Atlético Nacional

Senior career*
Years	Team	Apps	(Gls)
2018–2021	Atlético Nacional	0	(0)
2018–2019	→ Real Cartagena (loan)	15	(2)
2020	→ Čukarički (loan)	6	(1)
2020–2021	→ Mačva Šabac (loan)	29	(7)
2021–2022	Proleter Novi Sad	20	(2)
2022	→ Ufa (loan)	11	(1)
2022–2023	Ufa	27	(1)
2023–2024	Slaven Belupo	16	(0)
2024–2025	Radnički 1923	24	(2)
2025	Mladost Lučani	15	(2)
2025–	Ufa	25	(8)

International career^{‡}
2017	Colombia U17		
2019	Colombia U20	3	(0)
- * Club domestic league appearances and goals as of 16 May 2026 ‡ National team caps and goals as of 2 November 2020

Dilan Andrés Ortíz Aragón (born 15 March 2000) is a Colombian professional footballer who plays as a forward for Russian club Ufa.

== Club career ==
Born in Popayán, Ortíz came through the youth ranks of Atlético Nacional. At club level, Ortíz made his debut playing on loan at Real Cartagena making 14 appearances and scoring twice in the 2018 Categoría Primera B season. Then, in June next year, at the end of the first semester of the 2019 Categoría Primera B season, the loan contract expired and Ortíz left Real Cartagena. He returned to his club, Nacional, but he soon arranged a new loan deal, this time in Europe, with Čukarički from Serbia. He debuted in the 2019–20 Serbian SuperLiga on 6 March 2020, in a home game against Spartak Subotica, a 4–1 win.

On 21 January 2022, he joined Russian Premier League club Ufa on loan with an option to buy. On 21 May 2022, Ortiz scored the winning goal for FC Ufa in the 90th minute in a 2–1 away victory over FC Rubin Kazan in the last matchday of the league season, which allowed Ufa to avoid direct relegation and forced Rubin's relegation instead. Ufa was nevertheless relegated a week later after losing in relegation play-offs to FC Orenburg, conceding the decisive goal in the 3rd added minute of the return leg. Ufa did not exercise their purchase option following the relegation.

On 25 June 2022, Ortíz returned to Ufa and signed a long-term contract. At the end of the 2022–23 season, Ufa was relegated again to the third-tier Russian Second League, foreign players are not eligible to play in the league. On 4 July 2023, his contract with Ufa was terminated by mutual consent.

From 2023 to 2024 he defended the colors of NK Slaven Belupo.

On 20 February 2024, Ortíz joined the Serbian SuperLiga club Radnički 1923 Kragujevac.

== International career ==
Ortiz was part of the Colombian U-20 team at the 2019 South American U-20 Championship.

== Honors ==
Atlético Nacional

- Florida Cup: 2020

Individual

- Serbian SuperLiga Player of the Week: 2024–25 (Round 22)

== Career statistics ==
As of 28 May 2022

Club	Season	League			Cup		Continental		Other		Total	
Club	Season	Division	Apps	Goals	Apps	Goals	Apps	Goals	Apps	Goals	Apps	Goals
Real Cartagena	2018	Categoría Primera B	14	2	–		–		–		14	2
Real Cartagena	2019	Categoría Primera B	1	0	2	0	–		–		3	0
Real Cartagena	Total		15	2	2	0	0	0	0	0	17	2
Čukarički (loan)	2019–20	Serbian SuperLiga	6	1	1	0	–		–		7	1
Mačva Šabac (loan)	2020–21	Serbian SuperLiga	29	7	1	0	–		–		30	7
Proleter Novi Sad	2021–22	Serbian SuperLiga	20	2	1	0	–		–		21	2
Ufa (loan)	2021–22	RPL	11	1	–		–		2 (Note: Appearances in the relegation play-offs)	0	13	1
Career total			81	13	5	0	0	0	2	0	88	13
