= Vladislav Kamilov =

Russian footballer

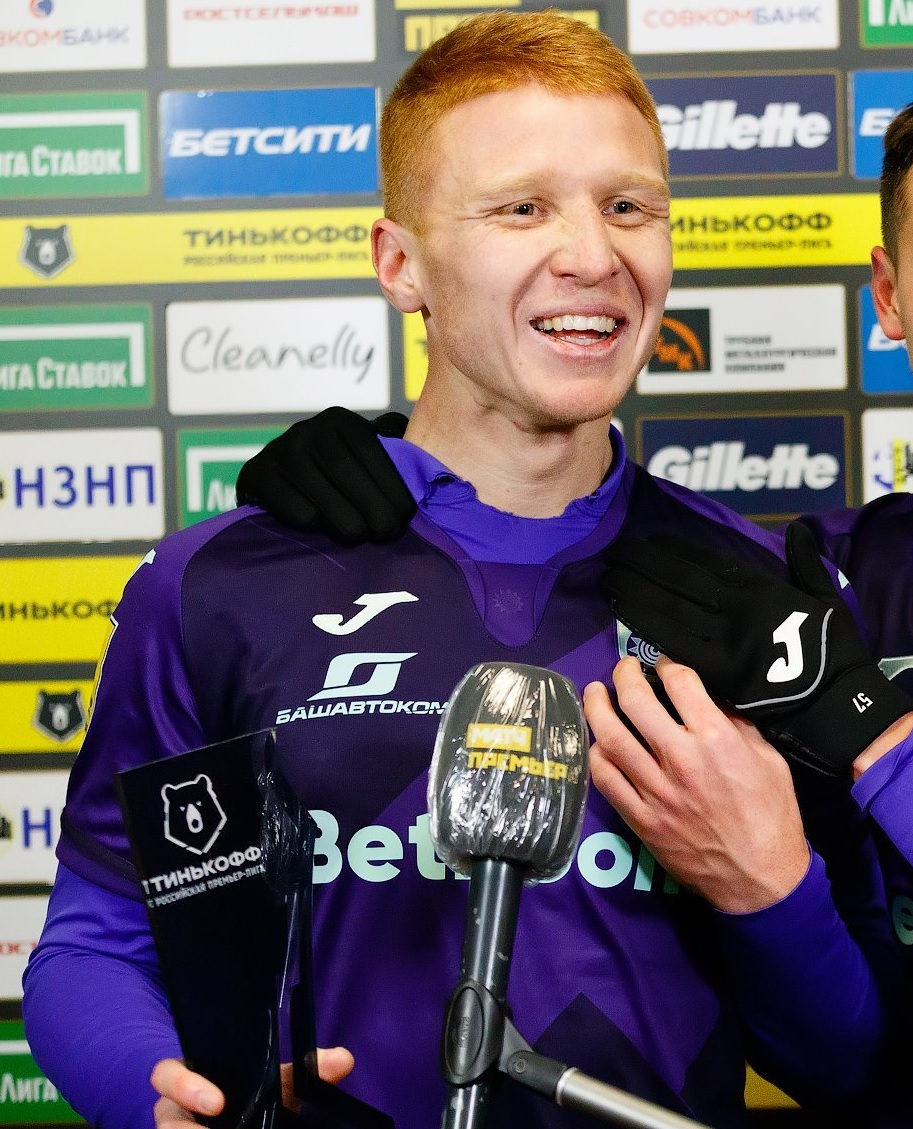
- Kamilov with FC Ufa in 2020

Personal information
- Full name: Vladislav Georgiyevich Kamilov
- Date of birth: 29 August 1995 (age 31)
- Place of birth: Kalmanka, Russia
- Height: 1.76 m (5 ft 9 in)
- Position: Central midfielder

Team information
- Current team: Spartak Kostroma
- Number: 18

Youth career
- Dynamo Barnaul
- Konoplyov football academy

Senior career*
Years	Team	Apps	(Gls)
2013	Dynamo Barnaul	6	(0)
2013–2014	Rostov	0	(0)
2015	Dynamo Barnaul	16	(0)
2016	Nosta Novotroitsk	22	(3)
2017	Volgar Astrakhan	10	(1)
2017–2019	Shinnik Yaroslavl	62	(7)
2019–2020	SKA-Khabarovsk	35	(7)
2020–2022	Ufa	52	(7)
2022–2025	Akhmat Grozny	65	(5)
2025–2026	Orenburg	15	(1)
2026	Ufa	11	(1)
2026–	Spartak Kostroma	0	(0)

International career
2011	Russia U-16	7	(1)
2012	Russia U-17	3	(0)
- * Club domestic league appearances and goals as of 16 May 2026

Vladislav Georgiyevich Kamilov (Russian: Владислав Георгиевич Камилов; born 29 August 1995) is a Russian professional footballer who plays as a central midfielder for Spartak Kostroma.

== Club career ==
He made his debut in the Russian Second Division for Dynamo Barnaul on 22 April 2013 in a game against Yakutiya Yakutsk.

He made his Russian Football National League debut for Volgar Astrakhan on 19 March 2017 in a game against Neftekhimik Nizhnekamsk.

On 21 August 2020, he joined Russian Premier League club Ufa. He made his Russian Premier League debut for Ufa on 26 September 2020 in a game against Zenit St. Petersburg.

On 4 September 2022, Kamilov signed a three-year contract with Akhmat Grozny. Kamilov left Akhmat on 14 June 2025.

On 29 January 2026, Kamilov returned to Ufa.

== Career statistics ==
As of match played 29 November 2025

Appearances and goals by club, season and competition
Club	Season	League			Cup		Europe		Other		Total	
Club	Season	Division	Apps	Goals	Apps	Goals	Apps	Goals	Apps	Goals	Apps	Goals
Dynamo Barnaul	2012–13	Russian Second League	6	0	0	0	—		—		6	0
Dynamo Barnaul	2015–16	Russian Second League	16	0	3	0	—		—		19	0
Dynamo Barnaul	Total		22	0	3	0	0	0	0	0	25	0
Nosta Novotroitsk	2015–16	Russian Second League	8	2	—		—		—		8	2
Nosta Novotroitsk	2016–17	Russian Second League	14	1	1	0	—		—		15	1
Nosta Novotroitsk	Total		22	3	1	0	0	0	0	0	23	3
Volgar Astrakhan	2016–17	Russian First League	10	1	—		—		2 (Note: Appearances in the FNL Cup)	0	12	1
Shinnik Yaroslavl	2017–18	Russian First League	32	1	5	0	—		4	0	41	1
Shinnik Yaroslavl	2018–19	Russian First League	30	6	1	0	—		5	1	36	7
Shinnik Yaroslavl	Total		62	7	6	0	0	0	9	1	77	8
SKA-Khabarovsk	2019–20	Russian First League	27	5	2	0	—		—		29	5
SKA-Khabarovsk	2020–21	Russian First League	8	2	1	0	—		—		9	2
SKA-Khabarovsk	Total		35	7	3	0	0	0	0	0	38	7
Ufa	2020–21	Russian Premier League	18	4	3	0	—		—		21	4
Ufa	2021–22	Russian Premier League	26	2	2	0	—		2 (Note: Appearances in the relegation play-offs)	1	30	3
Ufa	2022–23	First League	8	1	—		—		—		8	1
Ufa	Total		52	7	5	0	0	0	2	1	59	8
Akhmat Grozny	2022–23	Russian Premier League	20	2	5	0	—		—		25	2
Akhmat Grozny	2023–24	Russian Premier League	20	1	7	0	—		—		27	1
Akhmat Grozny	2024–25	Russian Premier League	25	1	8	0	—		2	0	35	1
Akhmat Grozny	Total		65	4	20	0	0	0	2	0	87	4
Orenburg	2025–26	Russian Premier League	15	1	7	1	—		—		22	2
Career total			283	30	45	1	0	0	15	2	343	33
