= Sergei Babkin =

Russian footballer

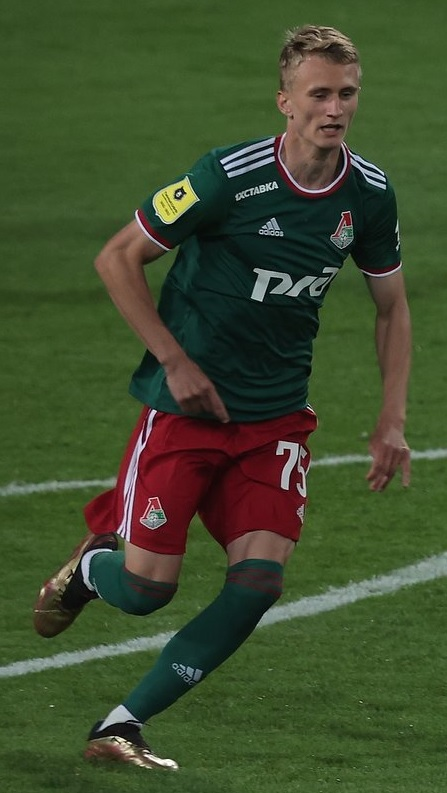
- Babkin with Lokomotiv Moscow in 2021

Personal information
- Full name: Sergei Sergeyevich Babkin
- Date of birth: 25 September 2002 (age 24)
- Place of birth: Volgograd, Russia
- Height: 1.76 m (5 ft 9 in)
- Position: Central midfielder

Team information
- Current team: Lokomotiv Moscow
- Number: 6

Youth career
- –2017: SDYuSShOR-11 Zenit Volgograd
- 2017–2019: Anzhi Makhachkala
- 2019–2021: Lokomotiv Moscow

Senior career*
Years	Team	Apps	(Gls)
2021–2022	Kazanka Moscow	15	(0)
2021–2023	Lokomotiv Moscow	16	(0)
2022–2023	→ Krylia Sovetov Samara (loan)	22	(3)
2023–2026	Krylia Sovetov Samara	75	(3)
2026–	Lokomotiv Moscow	10	(0)
- * Club domestic league appearances and goals as of 22 November 2026

Sergei Sergeyevich Babkin (Russian: Сергей Сергеевич Бабкин; born 25 September 2002) is a Russian football player who plays as a central midfielder for Lokomotiv Moscow.

== Club career ==
He made his debut in the Russian Premier League for Lokomotiv Moscow on 24 July 2021 in a game against Arsenal Tula. He substituted Fyodor Smolov in the 90th minute.

On 7 September 2022, Babkin joined Krylia Sovetov Samara on loan until the end of the season, with an option to buy. The loan was extended for the 2023–24 season.

On 13 September 2023, Krylia Sovetov made the transfer permanent and signed a four-year contract with Babkin. In early 2026, Babkin extended his contract with Krylia Sovetov until June 2029.

On 21 August 2026, Babkin returned to Lokomotiv Moscow and signed a five-year contract with the club.

== International career ==
Babkin was first called up to the Russia national football team for a training camp in September 2023.

== Career statistics ==
As of match played 22 November 2026

Appearances and goals by club, season and competition
Club	Season	League			Russian Cup		Europe		Other		Total	
Club	Season	Division	Apps	Goals	Apps	Goals	Apps	Goals	Apps	Goals	Apps	Goals
Kazanka Moscow	2020–21	Russian Second League	11	0	—		—		—		11	0
Kazanka Moscow	2021–22	Russian Second League	4	0	—		—		—		4	0
Kazanka Moscow	Total		15	0	0	0	0	0	0	0	15	0
Lokomotiv Moscow	2021–22	Russian Premier League	15	0	1	0	1 (Note: Appearance in the UEFA Europa League)	0	1 (Note: Appearance in the Russian Super Cup)	0	18	0
Lokomotiv Moscow	2022–23	Russian Premier League	1	0	1	0	—		—		2	0
Lokomotiv Moscow	Total		16	0	2	0	1	0	1	0	20	0
Krylia Sovetov Samara (loan)	2022–23	Russian Premier League	16	1	6	0	—		—		22	1
Krylia Sovetov Samara (loan)	2023–24	Russian Premier League	6	2	2	0	—		—		8	2
Krylia Sovetov Samara (loan)	Total		22	3	8	0	—		—		30	3
Krylia Sovetov Samara	2023–24	Russian Premier League	19	2	3	0	—		—		22	2
Krylia Sovetov Samara	2024–25	Russian Premier League	29	0	6	0	—		—		35	0
Krylia Sovetov Samara	2025–26	Russian Premier League	23	1	6	1	—		—		29	2
Krylia Sovetov Samara	2026–27	Russian Premier League	4	0	2	0	—		—		6	0
Krylia Sovetov Samara	Total		75	3	17	1	—		—		92	4
Krylia Sovetov Samara	Club total		97	6	25	1	—		—		122	7
Lokomotiv Moscow	2026–27	Russian Premier League	10	0	2	0	—		—		12	0
Lokomotiv Moscow	Club total		26	0	4	0	1	0	1	0	32	0
Career total			138	6	29	1	1	0	1	0	169	7
