= Egas Cacintura =

Angolan footballer (born 1997)

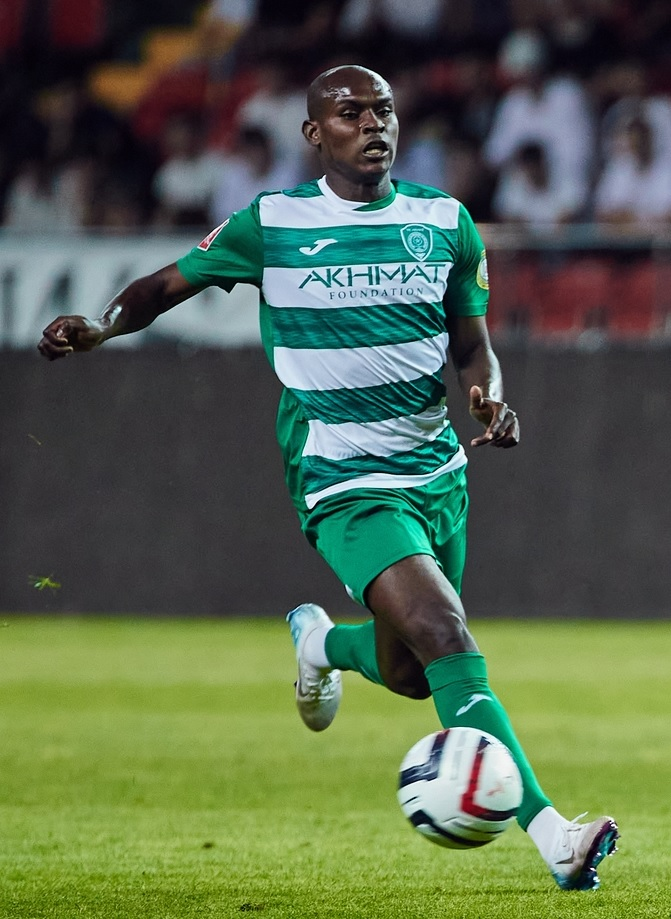
- Cacintura with Akhmat in 2025

Personal information
- Full name: Egas Palanga dos Santos Cacintura
- Date of birth: 29 October 1997 (age 29)
- Place of birth: Moçâmedes, Angola
- Height: 1.75 m (5 ft 9 in)
- Position: Attacking midfielder

Team information
- Current team: Akhmat Grozny
- Number: 17

Senior career*
| Years | Team | Apps | (Gls) |
| 2021–2023 | Ufa | 58 | (3) |
| 2023–2025 | Dynamo Makhachkala | 59 | (9) |
| 2025– | Akhmat Grozny | 41 | (12) |
- * Club domestic league appearances and goals as of 21 November 2026

Egas Palanga dos Santos Cacintura (born 29 October 1997) is an Angolan professional football player who plays as an attacking midfielder for Russian club Akhmat Grozny. He can also play as a left midfielder or right midfielder.

== Club career ==
In 2015, he enrolled in Kuban State Technological University in Russia where he studied to become an oil industry specialist. He also participated in the university's futsal team.

In 2019, he signed with Syktyvkar-based Russian Futsal Super League team Novaya Generatsiya, continuing his education remotely.

In the summer of 2021, he switched from futsal to football. On 23 July 2021, he signed a contract with Russian Premier League club Ufa. He made his RPL debut for Ufa on 25 July 2021 in a game against CSKA Moscow.

Cacintura terminated his contract with Ufa by mutual consent in June 2023, following the club's relegation to the third-tier Russian Second League.

On 27 June 2023, Cacintura signed a three-year contract with Russian First League club Dynamo Makhachkala. Dynamo was promoted to the Russian Premier League for the 2024–25 season.

On 20 June 2025, Cacintura moved to Akhmat Grozny on a three-year deal.

== Career statistics ==
As of match played 21 November 2026

Appearances and goals by club, season and competition
| Club | Season | League | | | Cup | | Other | | Total | |
| Club | Season | Division | Apps | Goals | Apps | Goals | Apps | Goals | Apps | Goals |
|---|---|---|---|---|---|---|---|---|---|---|
| Ufa | 2021–22 | Russian Premier League | 27 | 0 | 1 | 0 | 2 (Note: Appearances in the relegation play-offs) | 0 | 30 | 0 |
| Ufa | 2022–23 | Russian First League | 31 | 3 | 4 | 1 | — | | 35 | 4 |
| Ufa | Total | | 58 | 3 | 5 | 1 | 2 | 0 | 65 | 4 |
| Dynamo Makhachkala | 2023–24 | Russian First League | 33 | 5 | 0 | 0 | — | | 33 | 5 |
| Dynamo Makhachkala | 2024–25 | Russian Premier League | 26 | 4 | 6 | 0 | — | | 32 | 4 |
| Dynamo Makhachkala | Total | | 59 | 9 | 6 | 0 | — | | 65 | 9 |
| Akhmat Grozny | 2025–26 | Russian Premier League | 28 | 9 | 6 | 0 | — | | 34 | 9 |
| Akhmat Grozny | 2026–27 | Russian Premier League | 13 | 3 | 5 | 2 | — | | 18 | 5 |
| Akhmat Grozny | Total | | 41 | 12 | 11 | 2 | — | | 52 | 14 |
| Career total | | | 158 | 24 | 22 | 3 | 2 | 0 | 182 | 27 |
