= FC Spartak Tuymazy =

Russian football team based in Moscow

- Full name: Football Club Spartak Tuymazy
- Founded: 1967
- Dissolved: 2022
- Manager: Nail Khabibullin
- 2021–22: FNL 2, Group 4, 10th
- Website: http://www.spartak-tz.ru/

FC Spartak Tuymazy (Russian: ФК «Спартак» Туймазы) is a Russian football team from Tuymazy.

== Club history ==
The club was founded in 1967 and played on amateur levels. It was licensed for the third-tier Russian FNL 2 for the 2021–22 season. The club dropped out of the professional competitions following the season.
