= Aleksei Stukalov =

Russian football coach (born 1983)

Aleksei Stukalov Алексей Стукалов
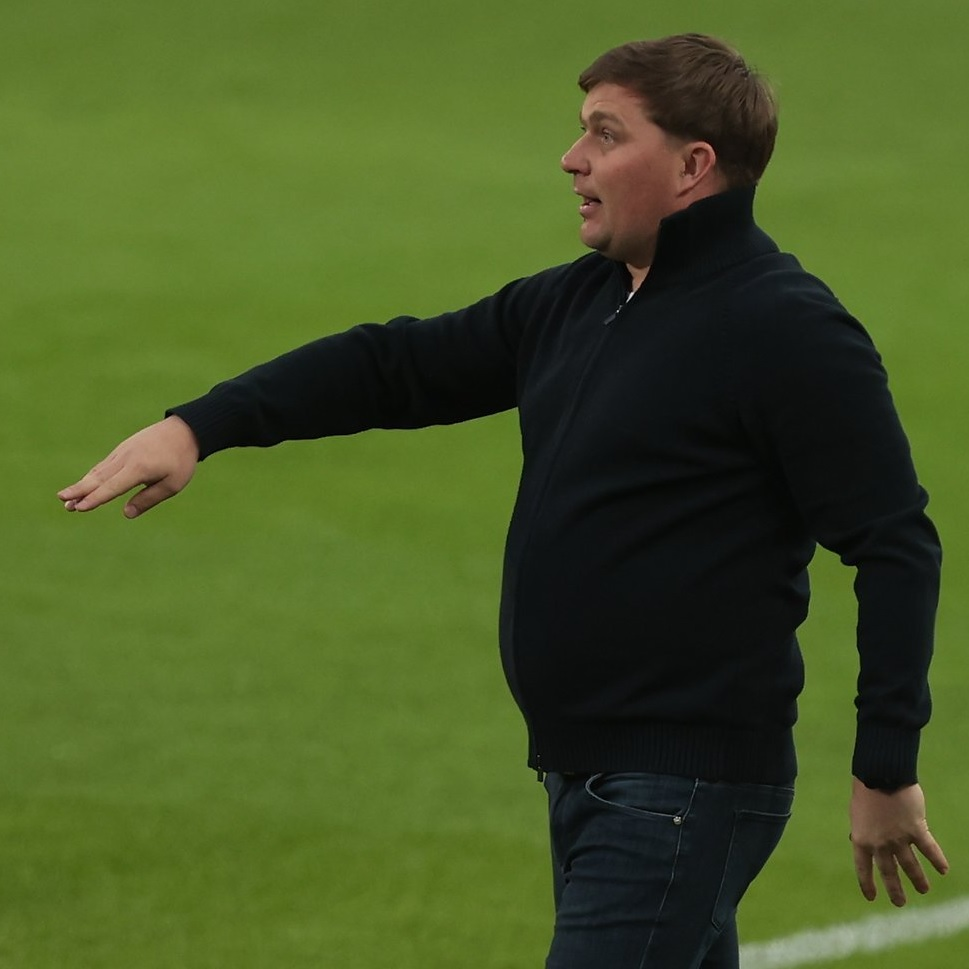
- Stukalov coaching FC Ufa in 2021

Personal information
- Full name: Aleksei Borisovich Stukalov
- Date of birth: 24 November 1983 (age 42)
- Place of birth: Stavropol, Russian SFSR

Team information
- Current team: FC Veles Moscow (manager)

Managerial career
- Years: Team
- 2005–2007: SDYuShOR-63 Smena Moscow (academy)
- 2009–2015: FC Khimki (academy)
- 2013–2015: FC Khimki-M (assistant)
- 2015–2016: FC Khimki (assistant)
- 2016: FC Khimki-M
- 2016: FC Baltika Kaliningrad (assistant)
- 2017: FC Sokol Saratov (assistant)
- 2017–2018: FC Sokol Saratov
- 2019–2021: FC Veles Moscow
- 2021–2022: FC Ufa
- 2022–2023: FC Rotor Volgograd
- 2024–2025: FC Sokol Saratov
- 2025–: FC Veles Moscow

Aleksei Borisovich Stukalov (Russian: Алексей Борисович Стукалов; born 24 November 1983) is a Russian football coach who is the manager of FC Veles Moscow.

== Coaching career ==
On 9 April 2021 he signed a contract with Russian Premier League club FC Ufa until the summer of 2023. On his RPL coaching debut on 10 April 2021, Ufa defeated FC Akhmat Grozny 3–0. In his second game on 18 April 2021, Ufa won 3–0 again, this time away against FC Spartak Moscow.

Stukalov left Ufa by mutual consent on 30 May 2022 following their relegation from the Russian Premier League.

On 27 June 2022, Stukalov signed with FC Rotor Volgograd.

== Personal life ==
His father Boris Stukalov is a football manager as well.
