= FC Ufa =

Russian football club

Ufa
- Full name: Football Club Ufa
- Nickname: Gorozhane (The Citizens)
- Founded: 23 December 2010; 15 years ago
- Ground: Neftyanik Stadium
- Capacity: 15,234
- Executive director: Marat Shmakov
- Head coach: Omari Tetradze
- League: Russian First League
- 2025–26: 15th of 18
- Website: www.fcufa.pro
Home colours	Away colours	Third colours

FC Ufa (Russian: ФК «Юффа», Bashkir: Өфө футбол клубы, romanized: Öfö futbol kluby) is a Russian football club based in Ufa that plays in the Russian First League.

== History ==
During the summer of 2010, Rustem Khamitov, the second President of the Republic of Bashkortostan, began considering the establishment of a football club with the intention to represent the city of Ufa and also the Republic in the Russian Premier League.

On 23 December 2010, FC Ufa was formed on the base of FC Bashinformsvyaz-Dynamo Ufa, which then plied their trade in the Russian Professional Football League, the third tier of the Russian football league system. The head coaching position of the team was first assigned to Andrei Kanchelskis, who was tasked with leading the club to the Russian First Division. The club also inherited Dynamo Stadium from the former team. The name of the club was at first decided in a contest with "Sarmat", named after the ancient Sarmatians were considered, but a name that would more clearly emphasize the status and geographical location, "Ufa" after the city was selected.

=== First season ===
The first official match of the club was against FC Syzran-2003 in the second round of the Russian Cup, which after extra time Ufa lost on penalties.

Ufa made their debut in the Russian league system on 24 April 2011 with a home match against FC Tyumen. Ufa ran out winners, 3–1, with Konstantin Ionov scoring a hat-trick for the hosts.

Ufa continued to build on their initial success to the extent that, coming to the end of the season, they were equal with Neftekhimik Nizhnekamsk at the top of the table with 86 points. However, Ufa's loss away to Nefthekhimik following the draw at Dynamo Stadium meant that Neftekhimik Nizhnekamsk had a better head-to-head record; Ufa had to postpone promotion to the Russian First Division for another year.

However, Dynamo Bryansk's failure to meet the licensing requirements for the 2012–13 Russian First Division opened up a slot in the said division, which Ufa took, enabling their promotion from the Second Division into the First Division.

=== Life in the First Division ===
In their first season in the First Division Ufa finished in sixth, four points off the last promotion playoff spot.

The following season showed improvement by Ufa, as the club had built on the previous year's showing and managed to end up in fourth, thus enabling them to contest the promotion playoff against Tom Tomsk, who finished their campaign in the Russian Premier League in 13th.

On 18 May 2014, Ufa welcomed Tom Tomsk in Dynamo for the first leg of the playoff and Ufa managed to overpower Tom 5–1, with club captain Dmitri Golubov scoring four goals. The return leg was played four days later in Tomsk, and despite going down early in the match, Ufa managed to hold on to their aggregate lead; a 3–1 loss to Tom was moot. Ufa therefore claimed a historic promotion to the top-flight Russian Premier League after just three seasons playing in the Russian league system.

=== Premier League period and two relegations ===
Italian singer and composer Maria Luisa Pensabene composed an anthem for Ufa in English and Italian, coinciding with the club's Russian Premier League debut.

Ufa moved from Dynamo Stadium to Neftyanik Stadium after the latter's completed renovation in 2015.

During the 2015–16 season, the team's head coach Igor Kolyvanov was dismissed due to unsatisfactory results, and was replaced by Yevgeny Perevertaylo on October 21, 2015. The change of coach helped Ufa, but in spring the team lost several decisive matches and before the last round of the league found itself in 15th place in the relegation zone, making Perevertaylo leave. Sergei Tomarov was appointed acting head coach for the last match, with whom Ufa managed to beat Moscow Spartak with a score of 3:1 and retain its place in the Premier League, avoiding even the relegation play-offs.

On 4 July 2016, Ukrainian midfielder and international player Oleksandr Zinchenko was transferred from Ufa to Manchester City in England for the transfer amount of £1.7 million, becoming the first transfer of a football player to an English top club in the history of Ufa.

At the end of the 2017–18 season, they secured 6th spot in the Russian Premier League, which qualified them for the 2018–19 UEFA Europa League due to FC Tosno, the Russian Cup winner, not applying for the UEFA license in time.

Ufa played their first ever European game at home against Slovenian side NK Domžale. The game finished in a goalless draw. Domžale dominated the return leg in Slovenia but Ufa did not give up and a late goal saw them draw 1–1 and progress on away goals. Next was Progrès Niederkorn for the Russian side, and another late goal in the return leg in Luxembourg send Ufa through 4–3 on aggregate and set them up against Scottish side Rangers in the play-off round. They lost 1–0 at Ibrox, and drew 1–1 at their stadium, which caused them to be eliminated from the play-off rounds of the Europa League, short from entering the group stage.

For the 2020–21 season, the club changed its colour scheme from red to purple and mint green.

In the 2021–22 season, Ufa avoided direct relegation by winning a dramatic away game against FC Rubin Kazan on the last matchday of the regular season, Dilan Ortiz scored a go-ahead goal in the 90th minute and Rubin's Vitaly Lisakovich missed the added-time penalty kick for Rubin, which would mean Ufa's direct relegation if scored, instead Rubin was relegated directly and Ufa qualified for the relegation play-offs. In the subsequent play-offs against FC Orenburg, Ufa was ahead 2–0 in the first leg away game before Orenburg came back and equalized 2–2. In the return leg on Ufa's home field, the score was 1–1 (which would keep Ufa's Premier League spot on away goals rule) before Orenburg's Andrei Malykh scored the winning goal in 4th added minute to ensure Ufa's relegation to FNL.

In July 2022, FC Ufa stopped cooperation with its sponsor, BetBoom and the team's home stadium, BetBoom Arena, has returned to its former name - Neftyanik. With the financial situation uncertain, by 18 October 2022 Ufa planned the lay-off of 250 employees. However, on 19 October 2022, the Ministry of Sports of the Republic of Bashkortostan agreed to become a sponsor and cover the club's financial needs with the order signed by Head of the Republic Radiy Khabirov. At the end of the 2022–23 season, Ufa suffered second consecutive relegation to the Russian Second League.

=== Russian Second League ===
At the start of the 2023–24 season at the Russian Second League, Sergei Gurenko was appointed head coach. Under the leadership of the Belarusian coach, Ufa played eight official matches in which they won two victories, drew three times and suffered three defeats before his dismissal on 28 August 2023. Yevgeni Kharlachyov who was assistant manager from the same season was appointed head coach in place. With Kharlachyov's leadership, Ufa managed to consistently stay in Group Gold. In Stage 1, Ufa finished in second place, keeping its place in the group for Stage 2. In Stage 2, Ufa finished in first place of the group, winning the first automatic promotion back to the First League for the season. Initially the licence for the 2024–25 First League was denied by the Russian Football Union. On 4 June 2024 after a successful appeal, the licence was granted by the Russian Football Union. The board of FC Ufa also extended the contract with Kharlachyov into the next season.

=== Return to Russian First League ===
Ufa's return to the Russian First League was met with poor performance, leaving the club barely above the relegation zone. Due to the poor performance, Kharlachyov was set to leave after 2024. At the first meeting of the board in 2025, the Club announced the appointment of Omari Tetradze as the new head coach, transferring Kharlachyov to the management of the youth team. On 15 February 2025, FC Ufa and Kharlachyov terminated their contract, with senior coach Evgeny Chernukhin and coach Mikhail Gaisin also leaving the club. Ufa finished 15th place out of 18, narrowly avoiding relegation back to the Second League. The licence to play in the following season was issued by the RFU.

The 2025-2026 continued with Ufa languising near the relegation zone. On May 3, 2026, a match between SKA-Khabarovsk and Ufa was postponed due to an enemy drone alert that prevented their flight for the away leg. Despite giving notice to their opponents and the RFU, the latter determined the postponed game as a technical defeat for Ufa. The financial situation of the Ufa football club remained an issue, and according to the Telegram channel Mash, the club has accumulated 8.9 million rubles in rental debt (3.4 million rubles reportedly the principal amount, and the remaining 5.5 million rubles as penalties for late payments). Ufa managed to conclude their season above the relegation zone.

=== Domestic history ===
Season	League									Cup	Top goalscorer		Manager	Kit Manufacturer	Sponsor
Season	Div.	Pos.	Pl.	W	D	L	GS	GA	P	Cup	Name	League	Manager	Kit Manufacturer	Sponsor
2011–12	3rd	2nd	39	25	11	3	54	19	86	Second round	Vitali Galysh	9	Andrei Kanchelskis; Andrei Malay; Igor Kolyvanov	Puma	Bashinformsvyaz
2012–13		6th	32	13	9	10	31	30	48	Fourth round	Mikhail Markosov	9	Igor Kolyvanov	Joma	Bashinformsvyaz
2013–14	2nd	4th	36	17	10	9	46	35	61	Fourth round	Dmitri Golubov	14	Igor Kolyvanov	Joma	Bashinformsvyaz
2014–15	1st	12th	30	7	10	13	26	39	31	Round of 16	Marcinho	6	Igor Kolyvanov	Joma	Bashinformsvyaz
2015–16	1st	12th	30	6	9	15	25	44	27	Quarterfinal	Sylvester Igboun	4	Igor Kolyvanov; Yevgeny Perevertaylo; Sergei Tomarov (caretaker)	Joma	Bashinformsvyaz
2016–17	1st	7th	30	12	7	11	22	25	43	Semifinal	Kehinde Fatai	6	Viktor Goncharenko; Sergei Semak	Joma	Bashinformsvyaz
2017–18	1st	6th	30	11	10	9	34	30	43	Round of 32	Sylvester Igboun	7	Sergei Semak	Joma	Bashinformsvyaz
2018–19	1st	14th	30	5	11	14	24	34	26	Round of 32	Sylvester Igboun	9	Sergei Tomarov; Dmitri Kirichenko; Vadim Evseev	Joma	Bashinformsvyaz
2019–20	1st	9th	30	8	14	8	22	24	38	Round of 16	Daniil Fomin	6	Vadim Evseev	Joma	Terra Bashkiria
2020–21	1st	13th	30	6	7	17	26	46	25	Quarterfinal	Timur Zhamaletdinov; Vladislav Kamilov; Filip Mrzljak	4	Vadim Evseev; Rashid Rakhimov; Nikolai Safronidi (Caretaker); Aleksei Stukalov	Joma	
2021–22	1st	14th	30	6	12	12	29	40	30	Group Stage	Gamid Agalarov	19	Aleksei Stukalov	Joma	

=== European history ===
Ufa made their UEFA competition debut in July 2018, entering the 2018–19 UEFA Europa League second qualifying round.

Season	Competition	Round	Club	Home	Away	Aggregate
2018–19	UEFA Europa League	2Q	(Slovenia) Domžale	0–0	1–1	1–1 (a)
2018–19	UEFA Europa League	3Q	(Luxembourg) Progrès Niederkorn	2–1	2–2	4–3
2018–19	UEFA Europa League	PO	(Scotland) Rangers	1–1	0−1	1–2

=== Others ===
Ufa was a participant of the Korantina Homes Cup in Cyprus for 2017 and 2018, coming 1st place in both competitions.

== Current squad ==
As of 11 September 2026

Note: Flags indicate national team as defined under FIFA eligibility rules; some limited exceptions apply. Players may hold more than one non-FIFA nationality.

No.	Pos.	Nation	Player
1	GK	RUS	Timur Kraykov
2	MF	RUS	Vasili Cherov
5	DF	RUS	Denis Kutin
6	MF	RUS	Zaur Tarba
7	DF	RUS	Akhmed Davlitgereyev (on loan from Akhmat Grozny)
8	MF	RUS	Shamil Isayev
9	MF	RUS	Danil Lipovoy
10	FW	RUS	Georgi Gongadze
11	MF	RUS	Magomed Yakuyev
13	DF	RUS	Nikita Yefremov
14	DF	RUS	Ilya Agapov
15	MF	RUS	Alan Khabalov
17	DF	RUS	David Ozmanov
19	FW	RUS	Emil Mayorov

No.	Pos.	Nation	Player
20	MF	RUS	Timofey Shipunov
22	MF	RUS	Zalimkhan Yusupov
23	MF	RUS	Danil Akhatov
27	MF	RUS	Artyom Ivanov
31	GK	RUS	Aleksandr Belenov
43	DF	RUS	Artur Gilyazetdinov
48	MF	RUS	Aleksandr Lukyanov
56	GK	RUS	Aleksandr Lyasov
69	DF	RUS	Ilya Khanenko
70	FW	COL	Dilan Ortiz
79	MF	RUS	Konstantin Troyanov
88	FW	RUS	Migran Ageyan
97	MF	RUS	Artyom Polesovshchikov
99	DF	RUS	Andrei Yevdokimov

== Coaching staff ==
Role	Name
Head coach	(Russia) Aleksei Stukalov
Assistant coaches	(Russia) Nikolai Safronidi
Assistant coaches	(Russia) Dmitri Beznyak
Goalkeeping coach	(Russia) Anatoli Zarapin
President	(Russia) Marat Magadeev
Sporting Director	(Russia) Ildus Biglov
Director	(Russia) Shamil Gazizov

=== Past Head coaches ===
- (Russia) Andrei Kanchelskis (2010–2012)
- (Russia) Andrei Malay (2012, acting)
- (Russia) Igor Kolyvanov (2012–2015)
- (Russia) Yevgeny Perevertaylo (2015–2016)
- (Russia) Sergei Tomarov (2016, acting)
- (Belarus) Viktor Goncharenko (2016)
- (Russia) Sergei Semak (2016–2018)
- (Russia) Sergei Tomarov (2018)
- (Russia) Dmitri Kirichenko (2018–2019)
- (Russia) Vadim Yevseyev (2019–2020)
- (Russia) Rashid Rakhimov (2020–2021)
- (Russia) Nikolai Safronidi (2021, acting )
- (Russia) Alexei Stukalov (2021–2022)
- (Russia) Sergei Tomarov (2022)
- (Russia) Denis Popov (2022)
- (Russia) Arslan Khalimbekov (2022–2023)
- (Belarus) Sergei Gurenko (2023)
- (Russia) Yevgeni Kharlachyov (2023 —2025)

== Other clubs ==
WFC Ufa, a female football club, plays in the Russian First Division, the second tier of the Women Russian football system.

== Notable players ==
Had international caps for their respective countries. Players whose name is listed in bold represented their countries while playing for Ufa.

Russia

- (Russia) Sergei Borodin
- (Russia) Igor Diveyev
- (Russia) Daniil Fomin
- (Russia) Oleg Ivanov
- (Russia) Danil Krugovoy
- (Russia) Andrey Lunyov
- (Russia) Ivan Oblyakov
- (Russia) Dmitry Stotsky
- (Russia) **Viktor Vasin**
- (Russia) Anton Zabolotny

Europe

- (Armenia) David Yurchenko
- (Austria) Moritz Bauer
- (Belarus) Aleksey Skvernyuk
- (Belarus) Dzmitry Verkhawtsow
- (Belarus) **Syarhey Vyeramko**
- (Bosnia and Herzegovina) Haris Handžić
- (Czech Republic) Ondřej Vaněk

- (Georgia (country)) **Jemal Tabidze**
- (Luxembourg) **Olivier Thill**
- (Moldova) **Cătălin Carp**
- (Romania) **Ionuț Nedelcearu**
- (Serbia) Nemanja Miletić
- (Slovenia) **Lovro Bizjak**
- (Slovenia) **Bojan Jokić**
- (Ukraine) **Oleksandr Zinchenko**

North America

- (Costa Rica) Felicio Brown Forbes

Africa

- (Angola) Egas Cacintura
- (Ghana) Emmanuel Frimpong
- (Nigeria) **Sylvester Igboun**

Asia

- (Kyrgyzstan) **Valery Kichin**
- (Uzbekistan) Vagiz Galiulin
- (Uzbekistan) **Oston Urunov**

== Sponsorship ==
Sponsors

Period	Partner
2010—2015	OJSC "Bashinformsvyaz"
2012—present	Fund for Social Targeted Programs
2018—2022	BetBoom
2022—present	Republic of Bashkortostan

Technical partners

Period	Partner
2011—2012	Puma
2012 —present	Joma
