= Diocese of Arsenyev =

Diocese of Russian Orthodox Church in Arsenyev

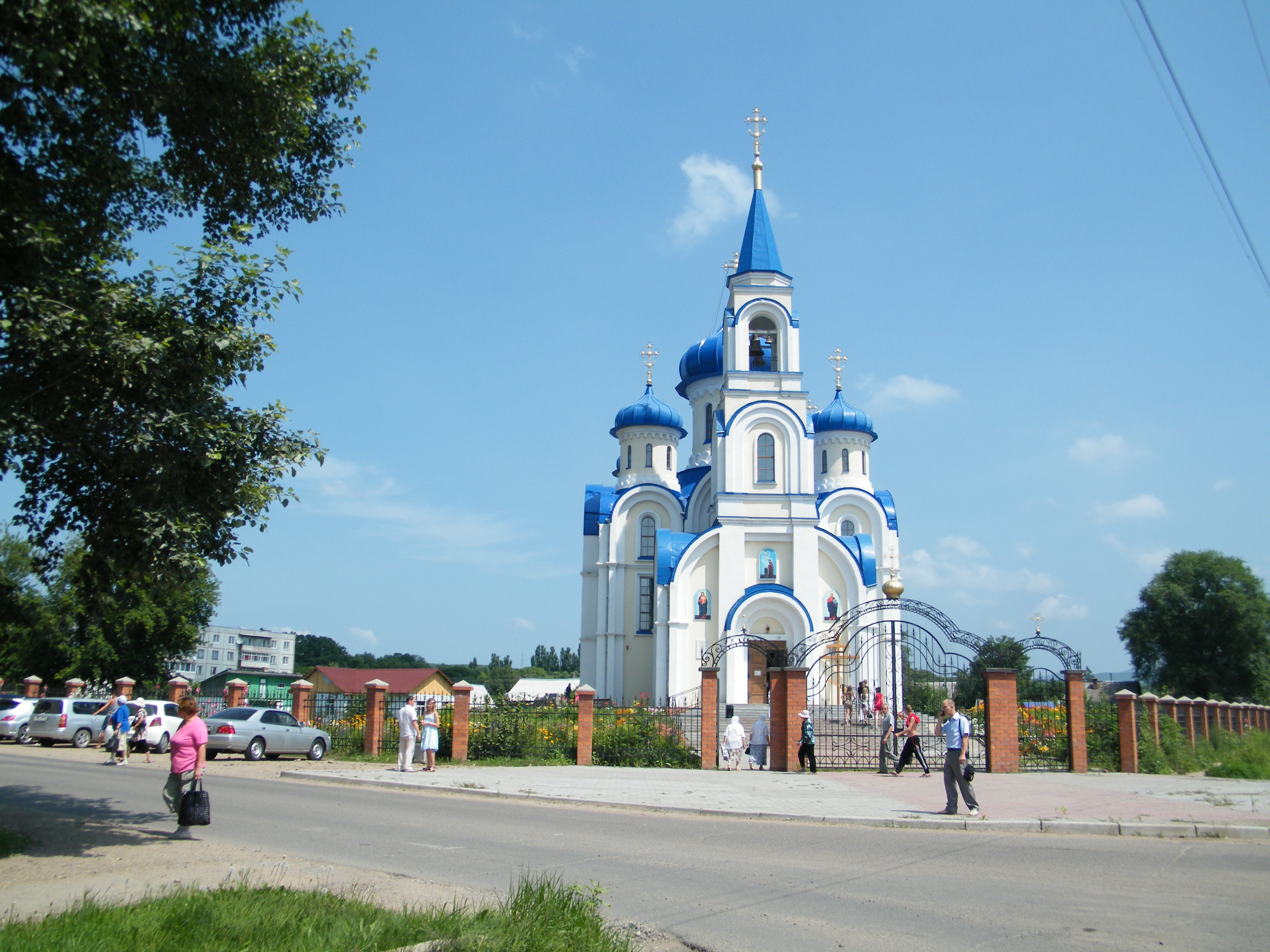
- Cathedral of the Annunciation in Arsenyev

Location
- Country: Russia
- Headquarters: Arsenyev

Information
- Denomination: Eastern Orthodox
- Sui iuris church: Russian Orthodox Church
- Established: 27 July 2011
- Language: Old Church Slavonic
- Governance: Eparchy

Website
- arseniev-eparhia.ru

The Diocese of Arsenyev (Russian: Арсе́ньевская епа́рхия) is an eparchy of the Russian Orthodox Church based in Arsenyev. It covers parishes in the eastern part of Primorsky Krai, including the cities of Arsenyev and Dalnegorsk, as well as the districts of Anuchinsky, Kavalerovsky, Olginsky, Terneysky, Chuguyevsky and Yakovlevsky.

== History ==
The diocese was separated and formed from the Diocese of Vladivostok and Primorsky by a decision from the Holy Synod on 27 July 2011.

On 15 September 2011, Archbishop Veniamin of Vladibostok and Primorsky officially opened the administration of Diocese of Arsenyev in a temporary location at the Cathedral of the Annunciation, as well as approved the elected council of the diocese.

On 6 October 2011, the Diocese of Arsenyev was included in the newly formed Primorsky Metropolis.
