= 2020–21 FC Ufa season =

FC Ufa
2020–21 season
- Chairman: Marat Magadeyev
- Manager: Vadim Evseev (until 7 October); Rashid Rakhimov (11 October - 3 April); Nikolai Safronidi (Caretaker) (3-9 April); Aleksei Stukalov (from 9 April)
- Stadium: Neftyanik Stadium
- Premier League: 13th
- Russian Cup: Quarterfinal vs Akhmat Grozny
- Top goalscorer: League: Three Players (4); All: Timur Zhamaletdinov (7)
- Highest home attendance: 9,660 vs Zenit St.Petersburg (8 May 2021)
- Lowest home attendance: 1,184 vs Krasnodar (9 August 2020)
- Average home league attendance: 4,143 (16 May 2021)
| Home colours | Away colours | Third colours |

The 2020–21 FC Ufa season was the Ufa's seventh successive season in the Russian Premier League, the highest tier of association football in Russia, and seventh in total.

== Season events ==
On 7 October, Vadim Evseev left his role as Head Coach of Ufa by mutual consent, with Rashid Rakhimov being anointed as his replacement on 11 October.

On 3 April, Rashid Rakhimov resigned as Head Coach of Ufa. On 9 April, Aleksei Stukalov was announced as Ufa's new permanent Head Coach on a contract until June 2023.

== Squad ==
As of 22 January 2021

Note: Flags indicate national team as defined under FIFA eligibility rules; some limited exceptions apply. Players may hold more than one non-FIFA nationality.

| No. | Pos. | Nation | Player |
|---|---|---|---|
| 1 | GK | RUS | Aleksei Chernov |
| 2 | DF | RUS | Grigori Morozov (on loan from Dynamo Moscow) |
| 3 | DF | RUS | Pavel Alikin |
| 4 | DF | RUS | Aleksei Nikitin |
| 5 | DF | SLO | Bojan Jokić |
| 7 | MF | RUS | Dmitri Sysuyev |
| 8 | MF | BDI | Parfait Bizoza |
| 10 | MF | UZB | Oston Urunov (on loan from Spartak Moscow) |
| 11 | DF | SRB | Nemanja Miletić |
| 15 | DF | RUS | Konstantin Pliyev |
| 16 | GK | RUS | Yury Shafinsky |
| 18 | FW | SRB | Komnen Andrić (on loan from Dinamo Zagreb) |
| 19 | MF | RUS | Oleg Ivanov |

| No. | Pos. | Nation | Player |
|---|---|---|---|
| 21 | FW | RUS | Magomedemin Rabadanov |
| 22 | DF | RUS | Artyom Golubev |
| 24 | MF | CRO | Filip Mrzljak |
| 27 | DF | RUS | Oleg Dzantiyev |
| 29 | MF | RUS | Vladislav Kamilov |
| 31 | GK | RUS | Aleksandr Belenov |
| 32 | DF | AUT | Moritz Bauer (on loan from Stoke City) |
| 33 | DF | RUS | Aleksandr Sukhov |
| 55 | DF | GEO | Jemal Tabidze |
| 57 | FW | RUS | Vyacheslav Krotov |
| 75 | FW | RUS | Timur Zhamaletdinov |
| 81 | GK | RUS | Ivan Kukushkin |
| 82 | MF | RUS | Nikita Belousov |

=== Out on loan ===
Note: Flags indicate national team as defined under FIFA eligibility rules; some limited exceptions apply. Players may hold more than one non-FIFA nationality.

| No. | Pos. | Nation | Player |
|---|---|---|---|
| 17 | MF | RUS | Nikolai Giorgobiani (at Alania Vladikavkaz) |
| 19 | FW | RUS | Gamid Agalarov (at Volgar Astrakhan) |

| No. | Pos. | Nation | Player |
|---|---|---|---|
| 23 | MF | RUS | Danila Yemelyanov (at Volgar Astrakhan) |
| 87 | MF | RUS | Igor Bezdenezhnykh (at Chayka Peschanokopskoye) |

== Transfers ==
=== In ===
| Date | Position | Nationality | Name | From | Fee | Ref. |
|---|---|---|---|---|---|---|
| 23 July 2020 | DF | (Russia) | Artyom Golubev | Krasnodar | Undisclosed | |
| 12 August 2020 | FW | (Russia) | Timur Zhamaletdinov | CSKA Moscow | Undisclosed | |
| 23 September 2020 | MF | (Russia) | Vladislav Kamilov | SKA-Khabarovsk | Undisclosed | |
| 20 November 2020 | MF | (Croatia) | Filip Mrzljak | Dinamo București | Free | |
| 21 January 2021 | MF | (Russia) | Oleg Ivanov | Akhmat Grozny | Free | |
| 19 February 2021 | MF | (Burundi) | Parfait Bizoza | Aalesunds | Undisclosed | |
| 24 February 2021 | DF | (Russia) | Oleg Dzantiyev | Olimp-Dolgoprudny | Undisclosed | |
| 25 February 2021 | GK | (Russia) | Ivan Kukushkin | Zenit St.Petersburg | Undisclosed | |
| 26 February 2021 | DF | (Russia) | Konstantin Pliyev | Rostov | Undisclosed | |
| 26 February 2021 | DF | (Serbia) | Nemanja Miletić | Olympiakos Nicosia | Undisclosed | |

=== Loans in ===
| Date from | Position | Nationality | Name | From | Date to | Ref. |
|---|---|---|---|---|---|---|
| 15 August 2020 | MF | (Ukraine) | Oleh Danchenko | Rubin Kazan | 31 January 2021 | |
| 28 August 2020 | DF | (Russia) | Sergei Borodin | Krasnodar | 19 February 2021 | |
| 24 September 2020 | DF | (Ukraine) | Akhmed Alibekov | Dynamo Kyiv | 25 February 2021 | |
| 25 September 2020 | DF | (Russia) | Konstantin Pliyev | Rostov | 26 February 2021 | |
| 16 October 2020 | FW | (Serbia) | Komnen Andrić | Dinamo Zagreb | End of season | |
| 17 October 2020 | DF | (Russia) | Grigori Morozov | Dynamo Moscow | End of season | |

=== Out ===
| Date | Position | Nationality | Name | To | Fee | Ref. |
|---|---|---|---|---|---|---|
| 3 August 2020 | MF | (Russia) | Daniil Fomin | Dynamo Moscow | Undisclosed | |
| 4 August 2020 | FW | (Nigeria) | Sylvester Igboun | Dynamo Moscow | Undisclosed | |
| 5 August 2020 | MF | (Uzbekistan) | Oston Urunov | Spartak Moscow | Undisclosed | |
| 6 August 2020 | DF | (Russia) | Aleksandr Putsko | Akhmat Grozny | Undisclosed | |
| 14 September 2020 | FW | (Slovenia) | Andrés Vombergar | Olimpija Ljubljana | Undisclosed | |
| 5 October 2020 | DF | (Romania) | Ionuț Nedelcearu | AEK Athens | Undisclosed | |
| 26 February 2021 | MF | (Russia) | Kirill Folmer | Rostov | Undisclosed | |

=== Loans out ===
| Date from | Position | Nationality | Name | To | Date to | Ref. |
|---|---|---|---|---|---|---|
| 7 October 2020 | MF | (Russia) | Danila Yemelyanov | Volgar Astrakhan | End of Season | |
| 16 October 2020 | MF | (Russia) | Igor Bezdenezhnykh | Chayka Peschanokopskoye | End of season | |
| 22 January 2021 | FW | (Russia) | Gamid Agalarov | Volgar Astrakhan | End of season | |

=== Released ===
| Date | Position | Nationality | Name | Joined | Date | Ref |
|---|---|---|---|---|---|---|
| 17 October 2020 | MF | (Luxembourg) | Olivier Thill | Vorskla Poltava | 30 December 2020 | |
| 25 December 2020 | MF | (Russia) | Azer Aliyev | Tambov | 24 February 2021 | |
| 15 January 2021 | FW | (Slovenia) | Lovro Bizjak | Sheriff Tiraspol | 29 January 2021 | |
| 18 January 2021 | DF | (Moldova) | Cătălin Carp | Tambov | 24 February 2021 | |
| 30 June 2021 | GK | (Russia) | Igor Maltsev | | | |
| 30 June 2021 | GK | (Russia) | Yury Shafinsky | | | |
| 30 June 2021 | GK | (Russia) | Aleksandr Zharovskikh | | | |
| 30 June 2021 | DF | (Russia) | Dmitri Malyshev | | | |
| 30 June 2021 | DF | (Russia) | Ivan Mikhaylov | | | |
| 30 June 2021 | DF | (Russia) | Turgay Mokhbaliyev | Rotor-2 Volgograd | | |
| 30 June 2021 | DF | (Russia) | Ilya Shudrov | Saturn Ramenskoye | | |
| 30 June 2021 | DF | (Russia) | Aleksei Yeliseyev | | | |
| 30 June 2021 | DF | (Russia) | Vladimir Yeliseyev | Krymteplytsia Molodizhne | | |
| 30 June 2021 | MF | (Russia) | Oskar Bashirov | | | |
| 30 June 2021 | MF | (Russia) | Konstantin Kovalchuk | | | |
| 30 June 2021 | MF | (Russia) | Nikita Mashko | Lada-Tolyatti | | |
| 30 June 2021 | MF | (Russia) | Artyom Pikarev | Dynamo St. Petersburg | | |
| 30 June 2021 | MF | (Russia) | Lev Safronov | | | |
| 30 June 2021 | FW | (Russia) | Daud Garifullin | Spartak Tuymazy | | |
| 30 June 2021 | FW | (Russia) | Nikita Komendantov | | | |
| 30 June 2021 | FW | (Russia) | Artyom Konovalov | | | |
| 30 June 2021 | FW | (Russia) | Dmitri Prokofyev | | | |
| 30 June 2021 | FW | (Russia) | Magomedemin Rabadanov | Krasava Odintsovo | | |
| 30 June 2021 | FW | (Russia) | Yevgeni Yegorov | Krasava Odintsovo | | |
| 30 June 2021 | FW | (Russia) | Arseni Zhugin | Spartak Tuymazy | | |

== Competitions ==
=== Overview ===
| Competition | First match | Last match | Starting round | Final position | Record | | | | | | | |
| Competition | First match | Last match | Starting round | Final position | Pld | W | D | L | GF | GA | GD | Win % |
|---|---|---|---|---|---|---|---|---|---|---|---|---|
| Premier League | 9 August 2020 | 16 May 2021 | Matchday 1 | 13th | 30 | 6 | 7 | 17 | 26 | 46 | −20 | 20.00 |
| Russian Cup | 16 September 2020 | 7 April 2021 | Round of 32 | Quarterfinal | 4 | 3 | 0 | 1 | 8 | 1 | +7 | 75.00 |
| Total | | | | | 34 | 9 | 7 | 18 | 34 | 47 | −13 | 26.47 |

Last updated: 16 May 2021
Source: Competitions

=== Premier League ===
==== League table ====
| Pos | Team | Pld | W | D | L | GF | GA | GD | Pts | Qualification or relegation |
|---|---|---|---|---|---|---|---|---|---|---|
| 11 | Akhmat Grozny | 30 | 11 | 7 | 12 | 36 | 38 | −2 | 40 | |
| 12 | Ural Yekaterinburg | 30 | 7 | 13 | 10 | 26 | 36 | −10 | 34 | |
| 13 | Ufa | 30 | 6 | 7 | 17 | 26 | 46 | −20 | 25 | |
| 14 | Arsenal Tula | 30 | 6 | 5 | 19 | 28 | 51 | −23 | 23 | |
| 15 | Rotor Volgograd (R) | 30 | 5 | 7 | 18 | 15 | 52 | −37 | 22 | Relegation to Football National League |

Source: Premier Liga
Rules for classification: 1) Points; 2) Head-to-head points; 3) Head-to-head matches won; 4) Head-to-head goal difference; 5) Head-to-head goals scored; 6) Matches won; 7) Goal difference; 8) Goals scored; 9) Play-off.
(R) Relegated

==== Results summary ====
| Overall | | | | | | | | Home | | | | | | Away | | | | | |
| Pld | W | D | L | GF | GA | GD | Pts | W | D | L | GF | GA | GD | W | D | L | GF | GA | GD |
|---|---|---|---|---|---|---|---|---|---|---|---|---|---|---|---|---|---|---|---|
| 30 | 6 | 7 | 17 | 26 | 46 | −20 | 25 | 3 | 4 | 8 | 15 | 19 | −4 | 3 | 3 | 9 | 11 | 27 | −16 |

Last updated: 16 May 2021.
Source: See Results

==== Results by round ====
| Round | 1 | 2 | 3 | 4 | 5 | 6 | 7 | 8 | 9 | 10 | 11 | 12 | 13 | 14 | 15 | 16 | 17 | 18 | 19 | 20 | 21 | 22 | 23 | 24 | 25 | 26 | 27 | 28 | 29 | 30 |
|---|---|---|---|---|---|---|---|---|---|---|---|---|---|---|---|---|---|---|---|---|---|---|---|---|---|---|---|---|---|---|
| Ground | H | A | H | H | A | H | A | A | A | H | A | A | H | A | H | H | A | A | A | A | A | H | H | A | H | A | H | A | H | H |
| Result | L | W | D | L | L | D | L | L | L | D | L | L | L | D | L | W | W | L | L | L | D | L | L | L | W | W | L | D | D | W |
| Position | 16 | 8 | 9 | 11 | 13 | 12 | 13 | 14 | 15 | 15 | 15 | 16 | 16 | 16 | 16 | 15 | 14 | 14 | 15 | 15 | 14 | 15 | 15 | 15 | 15 | 14 | 14 | 15 | 14 | 13 |

Updated to match(es) played on 16 May 2021. Source: Premier Liga
A = Away; H = Home; W = Win; D = Draw; L = Loss

==== Results ====
| 9 August 2020 1 | Ufa | 0 – 3 | Krasnodar | Ufa |
| 19:00 YEKT (UTC+5) | Bezdenezhnykh (yellow card) 42'; Jokić (yellow card) 67' | Report | Petrov (yellow card) 34'; Olsson (yellow card) 51'; Cabella 53', 63'; Berg 65' | Stadium: Neftyanik Stadium; Attendance: 1,215; Referee: Sergei Karasev |

| 14 August 2020 2 | Arsenal Tula | 2 – 3 | Ufa | Tula |
| 20:00 YEKT (UTC+5) | Grigalava (yellow card) 23'; Lutsenko 26'; Khlusevich (yellow card) 52'; K.Kangwa (yellow card) 59' (yellow-red card) 85' (goal) 72'; Bauer (yellow card) 62'; E.Kangwa (yellow card) 78' (yellow-red card) 90+'; Belyayev (yellow card) 90+' | Report | Golubev (yellow card) 25' (goal) 54'; Krotov 45+'; Bizjak 63' (pen.); Jokić (yellow card) 64' | Stadium: Arsenal Stadium; Attendance: 1,896; Referee: Sergey Lapochkin |

| 19 August 2020 3 | Ufa | 1 – 1 | Spartak Moscow | Ufa |
| 18:00 YEKT (UTC+5) | Alikin 2' (yellow card) 27'; Zhamaletdinov (yellow card) 78'; Folmer (yellow card) 80' | Report | Larsson (penalty missed) 12'; Ponce 18' | Stadium: Neftyanik Stadium; Attendance: 3,407; Referee: Stanislav Vasiliev |

| 23 August 2020 4 | Ufa | 0 – 1 | Rostov | Ufa |
| 18:30 YEKT (UTC+5) | Krotov (red card) 39'; Carp (yellow card) 77'; Agalarov (yellow card) 78' | Report | Hashimoto 79'; Bayramyan (yellow card) 82'; Chernov (yellow card) 90+1' | Stadium: Neftyanik Stadium; Attendance: 3,286; Referee: Mikhail Vilkov |

| 26 August 2020 5 | Rubin Kazan | 3 – 0 | Ufa | Kazan |
| 20:30 YEKT (UTC+5) | Hwang 47'; Makarov 55', 69'; Despotović (yellow card) 65' | Report | Sukhov (yellow card) 36'; Bizjak (yellow card) 36'; Thill (yellow card) 54'; Alikin (yellow card) 72'; Bezdenezhnykh (yellow card) 86' | Stadium: Ak Bars Arena; Attendance: 6,276; Referee: Pavel Kukuyan |

| 30 August 2020 6 | Ufa | 1 – 1 | Dynamo Moscow | Ufa |
| 16:00 YEKT (UTC+5) | Zhamaletdinov (yellow card) 12' (goal) 59'; Aliyev (yellow card) 43' | Report | N'Jie 43'; Kaboré (yellow card) 88' | Stadium: Neftyanik Stadium; Attendance: 2,936; Referee: Evgeny Turbin |

| 12 September 2020 7 | Tambov | 2 – 0 | Ufa | Saransk |
| 15:45 YEKT (UTC+5) | Oyewole (yellow card) 7'; Gritsayenko 42'; Kostyukov 79'; Kapliyenko (yellow card) 83' | Report | Sukhov (yellow card) 31'; Aliyev (yellow card) 40'; Nedelcearu (yellow card) 61'; Thill (yellow card) 62' | Stadium: Mordovia Arena; Attendance: 2,567; Referee: Kirill Levnikov |
Note: Match played at the Mordovia Arena in Saransk instead of Tambov's regular Spartak Stadium.

| 20 September 2020 8 | Ufa | 0 – 1 | CSKA Moscow | Ufa |
| 16:00 YEKT (UTC+5) | Bezdenezhnykh (yellow card) 32'; Carp (yellow card) 60' | Report | Maradishvili (yellow card) 16'; Bistrović 65' (yellow card) 89' | Stadium: Neftyanik Stadium; Attendance: 3,839; Referee: Nikolay Voloshin |

| 26 September 2020 9 | Zenit St.Petersburg | 6 – 0 | Ufa | Saint Petersburg |
| 18:30 YEKT (UTC+5) | Azmoun 24', 61'; Dzyuba 32' (pen.), 72', 88'; Yerokhin (yellow card) 63'; Sutormin 90+' | Report | Nedelcearu (yellow card) 29' | Stadium: Krestovsky Stadium; Attendance: 22,697; Referee: Alexey Sukhoi |

| 3 October 2020 10 | Ufa | 0 – 0 | Rotor Volgograd | Ufa |
| 18:00 YEKT (UTC+5) | Tabidze (yellow card) 13'; Pliyev (yellow card) 44'; Sysuyev (yellow card) 49'; Danchenko (yellow card) 52'; Aliyev (yellow card) 82' | Report | Flamarion (yellow card) 16'; Gogoua (yellow card) 30'; Zhigulyov (yellow card) 45+'; Aleynik (yellow card) 84'; Matricardi (yellow card) 84'; Kolesnichenko (yellow card) 90+'; Pesegov (yellow card) 90+' | Stadium: Neftyanik Stadium; Attendance: 5,247; Referee: Vitali Meshkov |

| 17 October 2020 11 | Lokomotiv Moscow | 1 – 0 | Ufa | Moscow |
| 18:30 YEKT (UTC+5) | Zhemaletdinov (yellow card) 17'; Krychowiak 67'; Zhivoglyadov (yellow card) 90+' | Report | Tabidze (yellow card) 90' | Stadium: RZD Arena; Attendance: 4,471; Referee: Pavel Kukuyan |

| 25 October 2020 12 | Akhmat Grozny | 3 – 1 | Ufa | Grozny |
| 21:00 YEKT (UTC+5) | Berisha 14' (pen.), 77' (yellow card) 77'; Semyonov (yellow card) 42' (yellow-red card) 58'; Ilyin 68' | Report | Pliyev (yellow card) 44'; Tabidze (yellow card) 52'; Aliyev 56'; Jokić (yellow card) 86' | Stadium: Akhmat-Arena; Attendance: 4,881; Referee: Sergey Lapochkin |

| 1 November 2020 13 | Ufa | 1 – 2 | Ural Yekaterinburg | Ufa |
| 14:00 YEKT (UTC+5) | Andrić (yellow card) 28' (goal) 62'; Carp (yellow card) 37'; Golubev (yellow card) 55'; Nikitin (yellow card) 79' | Report | Bicfalvi 27', 39' (pen.); Augustyniak (yellow card) 35'; Bavin (yellow card) 73'; Podberyozkin (yellow card) 90+' | Stadium: Neftyanik Stadium; Attendance: 2,569; Referee: Vladimir Moskalev |

| 6 November 2020 14 | Sochi | 1 – 1 | Ufa | Sochi |
| 21:00 YEKT (UTC+5) | Terekhov 53'; Miladinović (yellow card) 79' | Report | Morozov (yellow card) 13'; Andrić 87' (pen.) | Stadium: Fisht Olympic Stadium; Attendance: 3,963; Referee: Nikolay Voloshin |

| 23 November 2020 15 | Ufa | 1 – 2 | Khimki | Ufa |
| 19:00 YEKT (UTC+5) | Sukhov (yellow card) 39'; Jokić (yellow card) 75' (goal) 83'; Golubev (yellow card) 82'; Tabidze (yellow card) 86'; Mrzljak (yellow card) 89' | Report | Kukharchuk 5' (yellow card) 80'; Troshechkin 37'; Filin (yellow card) 48'; Glushakov (yellow card) 53' | Stadium: Neftyanik Stadium; Attendance: 1,424; Referee: Stanislav Vasiliev |

| 29 November 2020 16 | Ufa | 4 – 0 | Tambov | Ufa |
| 16:00 YEKT (UTC+5) | Zhamaletdinov 11', 54' (yellow card) 48'; Kamilov 45+'; Golubev (yellow card) 45+'; Danchenko (yellow card) 76'; Mrzljak 79'; Andrić (penalty missed) 90+' | Report | Gritsayenko (yellow card) 15' (yellow-red card) 37'; Kostyukov (yellow card) 42'; Onugkha (yellow card) 48'; Ciupercă (penalty missed) 74'; Ryzhikov (yellow card) 90+' | Stadium: Neftyanik Stadium; Attendance: 1,465; Referee: Aleksei Matyunin |

| 6 December 2020 17 | Rostov | 0 – 1 | Ufa | Rostov-on-Don |
| 16:00 YEKT (UTC+5) | Eremenko (yellow card) 27'; Bayramyan (yellow card) 47'; Normann (yellow card) 58' | Report | Krotov (yellow card) 64'; Andrić 70'; Pliyev (yellow card) 89'; Sysuyev (yellow card) 90+' | Stadium: Rostov Arena; Attendance: 7,192; Referee: Evgeny Kukulyak |

| 12 December 2020 18 | Rotor Volgograd | 1 – 0 | Ufa | Volgograd |
| 16:00 YEKT (UTC+5) | Aleynik (yellow card) 43'; Kipiani (yellow card) 45'; Mikeltadze (yellow card) 52'; Stepanov (yellow card) 59'; Makarov (yellow card) 66'; Mullin 78'; Davitashvili (yellow card) 81'; Flamarion (yellow card) 84' | Report | Kamilov (yellow card) 42'; Mrzljak (yellow card) 45+'; Sysuyev (yellow card) 46'; Pliyev (yellow card) 50'; Tabidze (yellow card) 65'; Morozov (yellow card) 72' (yellow-red card) 73'; Jokić (yellow card) 90+' | Stadium: Volgograd Arena; Attendance: 2,139; Referee: Vasily Kazartsev |

| 17 December 2020 19 | Krasnodar | 1 – 0 | Ufa | Krasnodar |
| 20:00 YEKT (UTC+5) | Berg 22'; Gazinsky (yellow card) 51' | Report | Krotov (yellow card) 4'; Mrzljak (yellow card) 48'; Alikin (yellow card) 53'; Belenov (yellow card) 82' | Stadium: Krasnodar Stadium; Attendance: 10,554; Referee: Kirill Levnikov |

| 27 February 2021 20 | Khimki | 2 – 1 | Ufa | Khimki |
| 19:00 YEKT (UTC+5) | Kukharchuk (yellow card) 21' (yellow-red card) 74'; Bozhenov (yellow card) 34'; Troshechkin (yellow card) 40'; Konaté 49' (yellow card) 60'; Glushakov 62' | Report | Kamilov (yellow card) 7' (goal) 90+' | Stadium: Arena Khimki; Attendance: 539; Referee: Artyom Lyubimov |

| 7 March 2021 21 | Ural Yekaterinburg | 0 – 0 | Ufa | Yekaterinburg |
| 16:00 YEKT (UTC+5) | Rykov (yellow card) 57'; Gadzhimuradov (yellow card) 73'; Kulakov (yellow card) 90+' | Report | Bizoza (red card) 14'; Sukhov (yellow card) 61'; Mrzljak (yellow card) 83' | Stadium: Central Stadium; Attendance: 4,575; Referee: Sergey Lapochkin |

| 14 March 2021 22 | Ufa | 0 – 3 | Rubin Kazan | Ufa |
| 14:00 YEKT (UTC+5) | Kamilov (yellow card) 20'; Golubev (yellow card) 33'; Ivanov (yellow card) 80' | Report | Abildgaard (yellow card) 29'; Makarov 30'; Kvaratskhelia 42'; Samoshnikov 74' | Stadium: Neftyanik Stadium; Attendance: 3,196; Referee: Igor Panin |

| 18 March 2021 23 | Ufa | 0 – 1 | Lokomotiv Moscow | Ufa |
| 19:00 YEKT (UTC+5) | Jokić (yellow card) 17'; Pliyev (yellow card) 77' | Report | Lisakovich (yellow card) 53'; Smolov (yellow card) 63'; Krychowiak 80'; Eder (yellow card) 86' | Stadium: Neftyanik Stadium; Attendance: 5,180; Referee: Stanislav Vasiliev |

| 3 April 2021 24 | Dynamo Moscow | 4 – 0 | Ufa | Moscow |
| 21:00 YEKT (UTC+5) | Lesovoy 10'; Tyukavin 27'; Ordets (yellow card) 41'; Neustädter 52'; Komlichenko 61' (pen.) | Report | Pliyev (yellow card) 43'; Alikin (yellow card) 71'; Mrzljak (yellow card) 85' | Stadium: VTB Arena; Attendance: 10,016; Referee: Ivan Sidenkov |

| 10 April 2021 25 | Ufa | 3 – 0 | Akhmat Grozny | Ufa |
| 18:30 YEKT (UTC+5) | Mrzljak 13'; Krotov (yellow card) 33'; Ángel 36' (o.g.); Miletić 54' (yellow card) 89'; Kamilov (yellow card) 55'; Pliyev (yellow card) 73' | Report | Timofeyev (yellow card) 15'; Nenakhov (yellow card) 90+' | Stadium: Neftyanik Stadium; Attendance: 5,621; Referee: Pavel Kukuyan |

| 18 April 2021 26 | Spartak Moscow | 0 – 3 | Ufa | Moscow |
| 21:00 YEKT (UTC+5) | Promes (yellow card) 7'; Ponce (yellow card) 11'; Gigot (yellow card) 28' (yellow-red card) 79'; Kutepov (yellow card) 86' | Report | Tabidze (yellow card) 27'; Kamilov 45', 87' (penalty missed) 87'; Mrzljak 48'; Bizoza (yellow card) 88' | Stadium: Otkritie Arena; Attendance: 10,980; Referee: Vitali Meshkov |

| 25 April 2021 27 | Ufa | 2 – 3 | Sochi | Ufa |
| 16:00 YEKT (UTC+5) | Krotov (yellow card) 19'; Mrzljak (yellow card) 50'; Jokić (yellow card) 54' (red card) 90+'; Kamilov (yellow card) 59'; Zhamaletdinov 78'; Ivanov (yellow card) 82' | Report | Prokhin 8'; Tsallagov (yellow card) 9' (yellow-red card) 45'; A.Zabolotny 14'; Noboa (yellow card) 52' (goal) 90+' (pen.); Miladinović (yellow card) 61' | Stadium: Neftyanik Stadium; Attendance: 7,232; Referee: Igor Panin |

| 1 May 2021 28 | CSKA Moscow | 1 – 1 | Ufa | Moscow |
| 18:30 YEKT (UTC+5) | Chalov 71' | Report | Mrzljak (yellow card) 64' (goal) 66'; Golubev (yellow card) 88'; Urunov (yellow card) 89'; Krotov (yellow card) 90+' | Stadium: VEB Arena; Attendance: 10,155; Referee: Vasily Kazartsev |

| 8 May 2021 29 | Ufa | 0 – 0 | Zenit St.Petersburg | Ufa |
| 16:00 YEKT (UTC+5) | Pliyev (yellow card) 80'; Belenov (yellow card) 90+' | Report | Azmoun (penalty missed) 45+'; Barrios (yellow card) 81'; Khotulyov (yellow card) 84' | Stadium: Neftyanik Stadium; Attendance: 9,660; Referee: Vladimir Moskalyov |

| 16 May 2021 30 | Ufa | 2 – 1 | Arsenal Tula | Ufa |
| 16:00 YEKT (UTC+5) | Ivanov 7'; Belyayev 43' (o.g.); Sysuyev (yellow card) 80' | Report | E.Kangwa 33'; Grigalava (red card) 53' | Stadium: Neftyanik Stadium; Attendance: 8,345; Referee: Sergei Karasev |

=== Russian Cup ===
==== Round of 32 ====
| Pos | Team | Pld | W | PW | PL | L | GF | GA | GD | Pts | Final result |
|---|---|---|---|---|---|---|---|---|---|---|---|
| 1 | Ufa | 2 | 2 | 0 | 0 | 0 | 5 | 0 | +5 | 6 | Advance to Play-off |
| 2 | Leningradets (E) | 2 | 0 | 1 | 0 | 1 | 0 | 1 | −1 | 2 | |
| 3 | Chertanovo Moscow | 2 | 0 | 0 | 1 | 1 | 0 | 4 | −4 | 1 | |

Rules for classification: 1) Points; 2) Wins; 3) Goal differential; 4) Goals scored; 5) Head-to-head result; 6) Disciplinary points.
(E) Eliminated

| 16 September 2020 1 | Leningradets | 0 – 1 | Ufa | Roshchino |
| 15:00 YEKT (UTC+5) | Kostin (yellow card) 68' | Report | Tabidze (yellow card) 48'; Bizjak 58'; Sukhov (yellow card) 78'; Golubev (yellow card) 90' | Stadium: Roshchino Arena; Referee: Andrey Fisenko |

| 21 October 2020 2 | Chertanovo Moscow | 0 – 4 | Ufa | Moscow |
| 21:00 YEKT (UTC+5) | Abayev (yellow card) 4'; Pershin (yellow card) 17' | Report | Zhamaletdinov (penalty missed) 5' 9' (yellow card) 35'; Morozov (yellow card) 25'; Krotov (yellow card) 28' (goal) 69'; Molodnyakov 58' (o.g.); Andrić 78' | Stadium: Luzhniki Olympic Complex; Attendance: 500; Referee: Artyom Chistyakov |

==== Knockout stages ====
| 3 March 2021 Round of 16 | Ufa | 3 – 0 | Ural Yekaterinburg | Ufa |
| 14:00 YEKT (UTC+5) | Bizoza (yellow card) 40'; Pliyev (yellow card) 43'; Zhamaletdinov 51', 67'; Andric 58' (pen.); Sukhov (yellow card) 64'; Mrzljak (yellow card) 66'; Miletić (yellow card) 89'; Jokić (yellow card) 90+5' | Report | | Stadium: Neftyanik Stadium; Attendance: 1,672; Referee: Pavel Shadykhanov |
Note: Match originally scheduled for 22 February, but postponed on 21 February due to server weather.

| 7 April 2021 Quarterfinal | Akhmat Grozny | 1 – 0 | Ufa | Grozny |
| 21:00 YEKT (UTC+5) | Bystrov (yellow card) 3'; Kharin 55'; Semyonov (yellow card) 65' | Report | Sysuyev (yellow card) 29'; Bizoza (yellow card) 62'; Nikitin (yellow card) 88'; Kamilov (yellow card) 88'; Morozov (yellow card) 90+3' | Stadium: Akhmat-Arena; Referee: Evgeny Kukulyak |

== Squad statistics ==
As of match played 16 May 2021

=== Appearances and goals ===
| No. | Pos | Nat | Player | Total | | Premier League | | Russian Cup | |
| No. | Pos | Nat | Player | Apps | Goals | Apps | Goals | Apps | Goals |
|---|---|---|---|---|---|---|---|---|---|
| 1 | GK | (Russia) RUS | Aleksei Chernov | 3 | 0 | 2 | 0 | 1 | 0 |
| 2 | DF | (Russia) RUS | Grigori Morozov | 15 | 0 | 9+4 | 0 | 2 | 0 |
| 3 | DF | (Russia) RUS | Pavel Alikin | 12 | 1 | 7+3 | 1 | 2 | 0 |
| 4 | DF | (Russia) RUS | Aleksei Nikitin | 26 | 0 | 22+1 | 0 | 2+1 | 0 |
| 5 | DF | (Slovenia) SLO | Bojan Jokić | 27 | 1 | 23+1 | 1 | 2+1 | 0 |
| 7 | MF | (Russia) RUS | Dmitri Sysuyev | 25 | 0 | 3+19 | 0 | 1+2 | 0 |
| 8 | MF | (Burundi) BDI | Parfait Bizoza | 9 | 0 | 3+4 | 0 | 2 | 0 |
| 10 | MF | (Uzbekistan) UZB | Oston Urunov | 10 | 0 | 4+4 | 0 | 2 | 0 |
| 11 | DF | (Serbia) SRB | Nemanja Miletić | 10 | 1 | 8+1 | 1 | 1 | 0 |
| 15 | DF | (Russia) RUS | Konstantin Pliyev | 20 | 0 | 17 | 0 | 3 | 0 |
| 17 | MF | (Russia) RUS | Nikolai Giorgobiani | 5 | 0 | 0+4 | 0 | 1 | 0 |
| 18 | MF | (Serbia) SRB | Komnen Andrić | 19 | 5 | 15+1 | 3 | 2+1 | 2 |
| 19 | MF | (Russia) RUS | Oleg Ivanov | 10 | 1 | 8+1 | 1 | 0+1 | 0 |
| 22 | MF | (Russia) RUS | Artyom Golubev | 30 | 1 | 13+13 | 1 | 1+3 | 0 |
| 24 | MF | (Croatia) CRO | Filip Mrzljak | 16 | 4 | 13+2 | 4 | 1 | 0 |
| 27 | DF | (Russia) RUS | Oleg Dzantiyev | 1 | 0 | 0 | 0 | 0+1 | 0 |
| 29 | MF | (Russia) RUS | Vladislav Kamilov | 21 | 4 | 17+1 | 4 | 2+1 | 0 |
| 31 | GK | (Russia) RUS | Aleksandr Belenov | 31 | 0 | 28 | 0 | 3 | 0 |
| 32 | DF | (Austria) AUT | Moritz Bauer | 8 | 0 | 7 | 0 | 1 | 0 |
| 33 | DF | (Russia) RUS | Aleksandr Sukhov | 15 | 0 | 11+2 | 0 | 2 | 0 |
| 55 | DF | (Georgia (country)) GEO | Jemal Tabidze | 24 | 0 | 22 | 0 | 2 | 0 |
| 57 | FW | (Russia) RUS | Vyacheslav Krotov | 26 | 3 | 18+5 | 2 | 1+2 | 1 |
| 75 | FW | (Russia) RUS | Timur Zhamaletdinov | 31 | 7 | 19+8 | 4 | 3+1 | 3 |
| 82 | MF | (Russia) RUS | Nikita Belousov | 2 | 0 | 0+2 | 0 | 0 | 0 |
Players away from the club on loan:
| 19 | FW | (Russia) RUS | Gamid Agalarov | 5 | 0 | 1+4 | 0 | 0 | 0 |
| 23 | MF | (Russia) RUS | Danila Yemelyanov | 4 | 0 | 1+2 | 0 | 0+1 | 0 |
| 87 | MF | (Russia) RUS | Igor Bezdenezhnykh | 10 | 0 | 5+4 | 0 | 0+1 | 0 |
Players who appeared for Ufa but left during the season:
| 8 | MF | (Moldova) MDA | Cătălin Carp | 12 | 0 | 9+3 | 0 | 0 | 0 |
| 9 | MF | (Russia) RUS | Kirill Folmer | 15 | 0 | 6+7 | 0 | 1+1 | 0 |
| 10 | MF | (Luxembourg) LUX | Olivier Thill | 7 | 0 | 1+5 | 0 | 1 | 0 |
| 11 | FW | (Slovenia) SLO | Lovro Bizjak | 8 | 2 | 3+4 | 1 | 1 | 1 |
| 27 | DF | (Romania) ROU | Ionuț Nedelcearu | 10 | 0 | 9 | 0 | 1 | 0 |
| 32 | FW | (Slovenia) SLO | Andrés Vombergar | 4 | 0 | 2+2 | 0 | 0 | 0 |
| 44 | DF | (Russia) RUS | Sergei Borodin | 1 | 0 | 0+1 | 0 | 0 | 0 |
| 77 | MF | (Russia) RUS | Azer Aliyev | 16 | 1 | 11+3 | 1 | 1+1 | 0 |
| 94 | MF | (Ukraine) UKR | Oleh Danchenko | 17 | 0 | 11+4 | 0 | 1+1 | 0 |
| 99 | DF | (Ukraine) UKR | Akhmed Alibekov | 3 | 0 | 2 | 0 | 1 | 0 |

=== Goal scorers ===
| Place | Position | Nation | Number | Name | Premier League | Russian Cup | Total |
|---|---|---|---|---|---|---|---|
| 1 | FW | (Russia) | 75 | Timur Zhamaletdinov | 4 | 3 | 7 |
| 2 | MF | (Serbia) | 18 | Komnen Andrić | 3 | 2 | 5 |
| 3 | MF | (Russia) | 29 | Vladislav Kamilov | 4 | 0 | 4 |
| 3 | MF | (Croatia) | 24 | Filip Mrzljak | 4 | 0 | 4 |
| 5 | FW | (Russia) | 57 | Vyacheslav Krotov | 2 | 1 | 3 |
| 6 | FW | (Slovenia) | 11 | Lovro Bizjak | 1 | 1 | 2 |
| 6 | | | | Own goal | 2 | 0 | 2 |
| 8 | DF | (Russia) | 22 | Artyom Golubev | 1 | 0 | 1 |
| 8 | DF | (Russia) | 3 | Pavel Alikin | 1 | 0 | 1 |
| 8 | MF | (Russia) | 77 | Azer Aliyev | 1 | 0 | 1 |
| 8 | DF | (Slovenia) | 5 | Bojan Jokić | 1 | 0 | 1 |
| 8 | DF | (Serbia) | 11 | Nemanja Miletić | 1 | 0 | 1 |
| 8 | MF | (Russia) | 19 | Oleg Ivanov | 1 | 0 | 1 |
| Total | | | | | 26 | 7 | 33 |

=== Clean sheets ===
| Place | Position | Nation | Number | Name | Premier League | Russian Cup | Total |
|---|---|---|---|---|---|---|---|
| 1 | GK | (Russia) | 31 | Aleksandr Belenov | 7 | 2 | 9 |
| 2 | GK | (Russia) | 1 | Aleksei Chernov | 0 | 1 | 1 |
| Total | | | | | 7 | 3 | 10 |

=== Disciplinary record ===
| Number | Nation | Position | Name | Premier League | | Russian Cup | | Total | |
| Number | Nation | Position | Name | Booked | Sent off (straight red) | Booked | Sent off (straight red) | Booked | Sent off (straight red) |
|---|---|---|---|---|---|---|---|---|---|
| 2 | (Russia) | DF | Grigori Morozov | 3 | 1 | 2 | 0 | 5 | 1 |
| 3 | (Russia) | DF | Pavel Alikin | 4 | 0 | 0 | 0 | 4 | 0 |
| 4 | (Russia) | DF | Aleksei Nikitin | 1 | 0 | 1 | 0 | 2 | 0 |
| 5 | (Slovenia) | DF | Bojan Jokić | 7 | 1 | 1 | 0 | 8 | 1 |
| 7 | (Russia) | MF | Dmitri Sysuyev | 4 | 0 | 1 | 0 | 5 | 0 |
| 8 | (Burundi) | MF | Parfait Bizoza | 1 | 1 | 1 | 1 | 2 | 2 |
| 10 | (Uzbekistan) | MF | Oston Urunov | 1 | 0 | 0 | 0 | 1 | 0 |
| 11 | (Serbia) | DF | Nemanja Miletić | 1 | 0 | 1 | 0 | 2 | 0 |
| 15 | (Russia) | DF | Konstantin Pliyev | 8 | 0 | 1 | 0 | 9 | 0 |
| 18 | (Serbia) | MF | Komnen Andrić | 1 | 0 | 0 | 0 | 1 | 0 |
| 19 | (Russia) | MF | Oleg Ivanov | 2 | 0 | 0 | 0 | 2 | 0 |
| 22 | (Russia) | DF | Artyom Golubev | 6 | 0 | 1 | 0 | 7 | 0 |
| 24 | (Croatia) | MF | Filip Mrzljak | 7 | 0 | 1 | 0 | 8 | 0 |
| 29 | (Russia) | MF | Vladislav Kamilov | 5 | 0 | 1 | 0 | 6 | 0 |
| 31 | (Russia) | GK | Aleksandr Belenov | 2 | 0 | 0 | 0 | 2 | 0 |
| 33 | (Russia) | DF | Aleksandr Sukhov | 4 | 0 | 2 | 0 | 6 | 0 |
| 55 | (Georgia (country)) | DF | Jemal Tabidze | 6 | 0 | 1 | 0 | 7 | 0 |
| 57 | (Russia) | FW | Vyacheslav Krotov | 4 | 1 | 1 | 0 | 5 | 1 |
| 75 | (Russia) | FW | Timur Zhamaletdinov | 3 | 0 | 1 | 0 | 4 | 0 |
Players away on loan:
| 19 | (Russia) | FW | Gamid Agalarov | 1 | 0 | 0 | 0 | 1 | 0 |
| 87 | (Russia) | MF | Igor Bezdenezhnykh | 3 | 0 | 0 | 0 | 3 | 0 |
Players who left Ufa during the season:
| 8 | (Moldova) | MF | Cătălin Carp | 3 | 0 | 0 | 0 | 3 | 0 |
| 9 | (Russia) | MF | Kirill Folmer | 1 | 0 | 0 | 0 | 1 | 0 |
| 10 | (Luxembourg) | MF | Olivier Thill | 2 | 0 | 0 | 0 | 2 | 0 |
| 11 | (Slovenia) | FW | Lovro Bizjak | 1 | 0 | 0 | 0 | 1 | 0 |
| 27 | (Romania) | DF | Ionuț Nedelcearu | 2 | 0 | 0 | 0 | 2 | 0 |
| 77 | (Russia) | MF | Azer Aliyev | 3 | 0 | 0 | 0 | 3 | 0 |
| 94 | (Ukraine) | MF | Oleh Danchenko | 2 | 0 | 1 | 0 | 3 | 0 |
| Total | | | | 88 | 4 | 17 | 0 | 105 | 4 |
