= Arsenyevka =

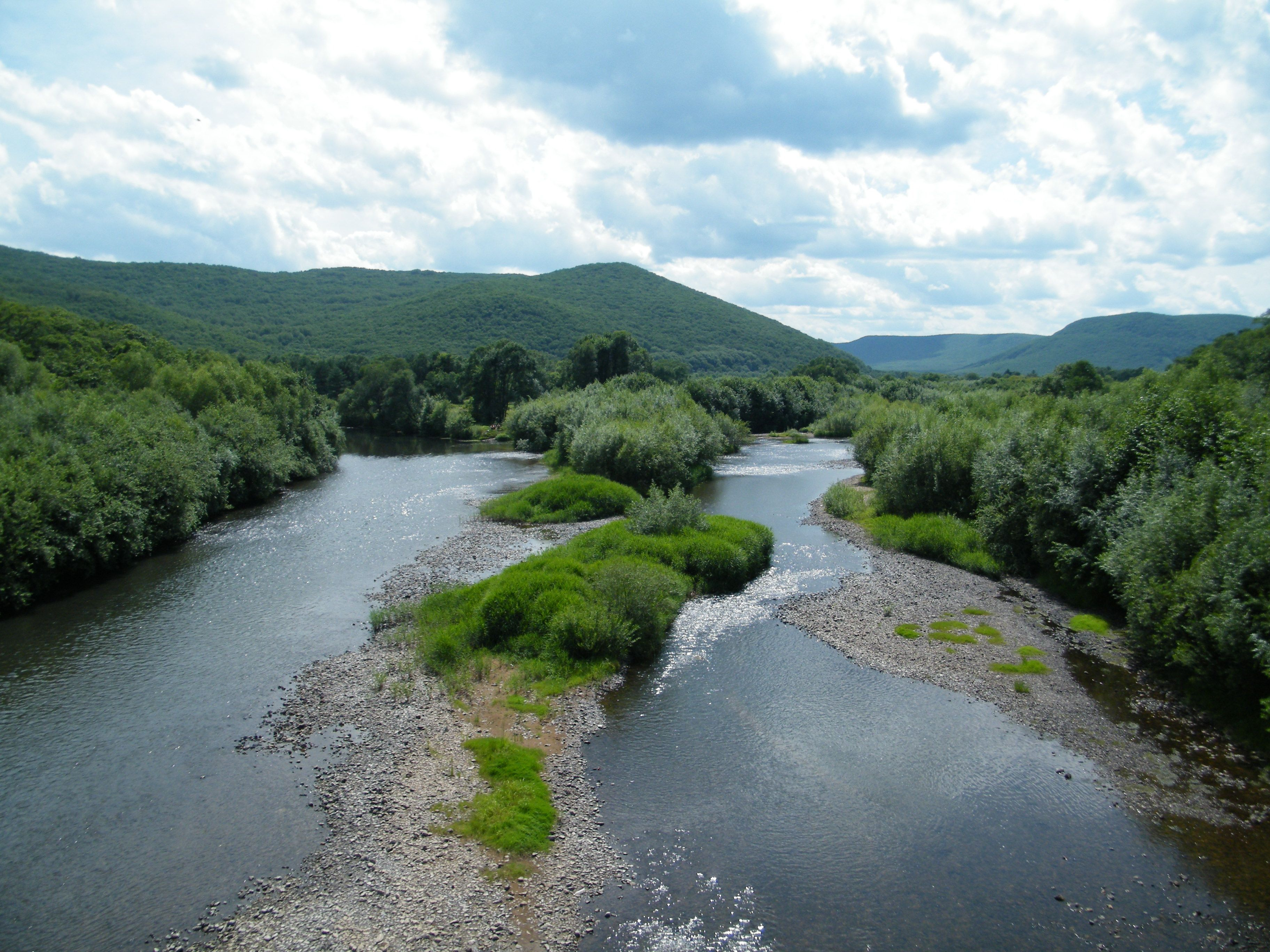
- The Arsenyevka near the selo (rural locality) of Anuchino in Anuchinsky District

- Location of mouth

Location
- Country: Russia

Physical characteristics
- Source
  - location: Sikhote-Alin
- Mouth: Ussuri
  - coordinates: 44.8463°N 133.5788°E
- Length: 294 km (183 mi)
- Basin size: 7,060 km^{2} (2,730 mi^{2})

Basin features
- Progression: Ussuri→ Amur→ Sea of Okhotsk

The Arsenyevka (Russian: Арсеньевка, formerly Daubi-He Russian: Дауби́хе) is a left tributary of the Ussuri in Anuchinsky and Yakovlevsky Districts of Primorsky Krai, Russia.

The length of the river is approximately 294 kilometers (183 mi) and its basin area is 7,060 square kilometers (2,730 sq mi). It rises on the western slope in the southwestern region of the Sikhote-Alin mountain range, near Mount Mednaya. It is named after Russian soldier and explorer Vladimir Arsenyev.

The largest inhabited localities on the river are Anuchino, Arsenyev, and Yakovlevka. The longest tributaries are the Muraveyka at 82 kilometres (51 mi) which joins the Arsenyevka near Anuchino, the Sinegorka at 52 kilometres (32 mi), and the Lipovtsy, 41 kilometres (25 mi).

Basin of the Amur
