= Artyom Golubev =

Russian footballer (born 1999)

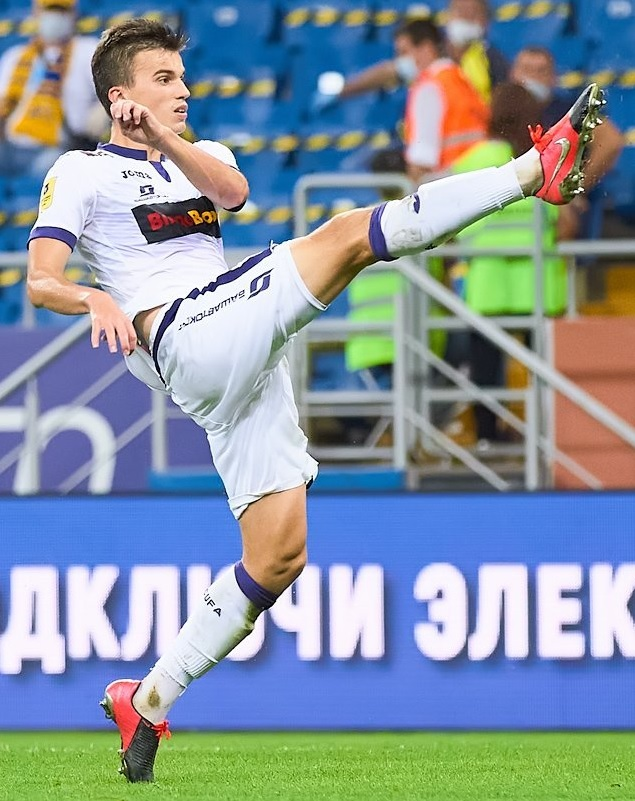
- Golubev with FC Ufa in 2020

Personal information
- Full name: Artyom Valeryevich Golubev
- Date of birth: 21 January 1999 (age 27)
- Place of birth: Volgograd, Russia
- Height: 1.81 m (5 ft 11 in)
- Positions: Midfielder; defender

Team information
- Current team: Shinnik Yaroslavl
- Number: 50

Youth career
- –2019: Krasnodar

Senior career*
Years	Team	Apps	(Gls)
2018–2020	Krasnodar	2	(0)
2018–2019	→ Krasnodar-2	37	(0)
2018–2019	→ Krasnodar-3	2	(0)
2019–2020	→ Ufa (loan)	19	(0)
2020–2024	Ufa	94	(2)
2024–	Shinnik Yaroslavl	48	(3)

International career^{‡}
2015	Russia U-16	3	(0)
2015–2016	Russia U-17	9	(1)
2016–2017	Russia U-18	13	(0)
2017	Russia U-19	6	(0)
2019–2021	Russia U-21	11	(0)
- * Club domestic league appearances and goals as of 16 May 2026 ‡ National team caps and goals as of 31 March 2021

Artyom Valeryevich Golubev (Russian: Артём Валерьевич Голубев; born 21 January 1999) is a Russian football player who plays as a defensive midfielder for Shinnik Yaroslavl.

== Club career ==
He made his debut in the Russian Professional Football League for Krasnodar-2 on 16 May 2018 in a game against Afips Afipsky.

He made his Russian Premier League debut for Krasnodar on 2 December 2018 in a game against Ural Yekaterinburg as a 84th-minute substitute for Mauricio Pereyra. He appeared for Krasnodar in 2018–19 UEFA Europa League knockout phase games against Bayer Leverkusen and Valencia.

On 31 July 2019, he joined Ufa on loan until 31 May 2021, with Krasnodar holding an option to terminate the loan early. On 23 July 2020, Ufa bought out his rights from Krasnodar.

== Career statistics ==
As of 16 May 2026

Club	Season	League			Cup		Continental		Other		Total	
Club	Season	Division	Apps	Goals	Apps	Goals	Apps	Goals	Apps	Goals	Apps	Goals
Krasnodar-2	2016–17	Russian Second League	—		—		—		1 (Note: Appearances in the FNL Cup)	1	1	1
Krasnodar-2	2017–18	Russian Second League	1	0	—		—		3	0	4	0
Krasnodar-2	2018–19	Russian First League	32	0	—		—		—		32	0
Krasnodar-2	2019–20	Russian First League	4	0	—		—		—		4	0
Krasnodar-2	Total		37	0	0	0	0	0	4	1	41	1
Krasnodar	2017–18	Russian Premier League	0	0	—		—		—		0	0
Krasnodar	2018–19	Russian Premier League	2	0	1	0	2 (Note: Appearances in the UEFA Europa League)	0	—		5	0
Krasnodar	Total		2	0	1	0	2	0	0	0	5	0
Krasnodar-3	2018–19	Russian Second League	2	0	—		—		—		2	0
Ufa (loan)	2019–20	Russian Premier League	19	0	1	0	—		—		20	0
Ufa	2020–21	Russian Premier League	26	1	4	0	—		—		30	1
Ufa	2021–22	Russian Premier League	22	0	1	0	—		1 (Note: Appearance in relegation play-offs)	0	24	0
Ufa	2022–23	Russian First League	28	1	4	0	—		—		32	1
Ufa	2023–24	Russian Second League A	18	0	4	0	—		—		22	0
Ufa	Total		94	2	13	0	0	0	1	0	108	2
Shinnik Yaroslavl	2023–24	Russian First League	6	0	—		—		—		6	0
Shinnik Yaroslavl	2024–25	Russian First League	13	0	0	0	—		—		13	0
Shinnik Yaroslavl	2025–26	Russian First League	29	3	2	0	—		—		31	3
Shinnik Yaroslavl	Total		48	3	2	0	0	0	0	0	50	3
Career total			202	5	17	0	2	0	5	1	226	6
