= Vitali Pyanchenko =

Russian footballer and coach

Personal information
- Full name: Vitali Vitalyevich Pyanchenko
- Date of birth: 11 February 1980 (age 46)
- Height: 1.93 m (6 ft 4 in)
- Position: Goalkeeper

Team information
- Current team: FC Sibir Novosibirsk (GK coach)

Senior career*
Years	Team	Apps	(Gls)
2001–2003	FC Dynamo-Mashinostroitel Kirov	70	(0)
2006	FC Metallurg Krasnoyarsk	1	(0)
2008–2010	FC Gornyak Uchaly	39	(0)
2011–2012	FC Tyumen	26	(0)
2012–2013	FC Gornyak Uchaly	26	(0)

Managerial career
- 2005: FC Metallurg Krasnoyarsk (assistant)
- 2018–2019: FC Yenisey Krasnoyarsk (U-21 GK coach)
- 2019–2022: FC Yenisey Krasnoyarsk (GK coach)
- 2022–2024: FC Yenisey-2 Krasnoyarsk (GK coach)
- 2025–: FC Sibir Novosibirsk (GK coach)
- * Club domestic league appearances and goals

Vitali Vitalyevich Pyanchenko (Russian: Виталий Витальевич Пьянченко; born 11 February 1980) is a Russian professional football coach and a former player. He is the goalkeepers' coach for FC Sibir Novosibirsk.

== Club career ==
He played in the Russian Football National League for FC Metallurg Krasnoyarsk in 2006.
