= Sibir Novosibirsk =

Sibir Novosibirsk may refer to one of the following sports clubs based in Novosibirsk, Russia:

- HC Sibir Novosibirsk, an ice hockey club
- FC Sibir Novosibirsk, a dissolved football club
- FC Sibir Novosibirsk (2019), a current football club
