= Kirill Folmer =

Russian footballer (born 2000)

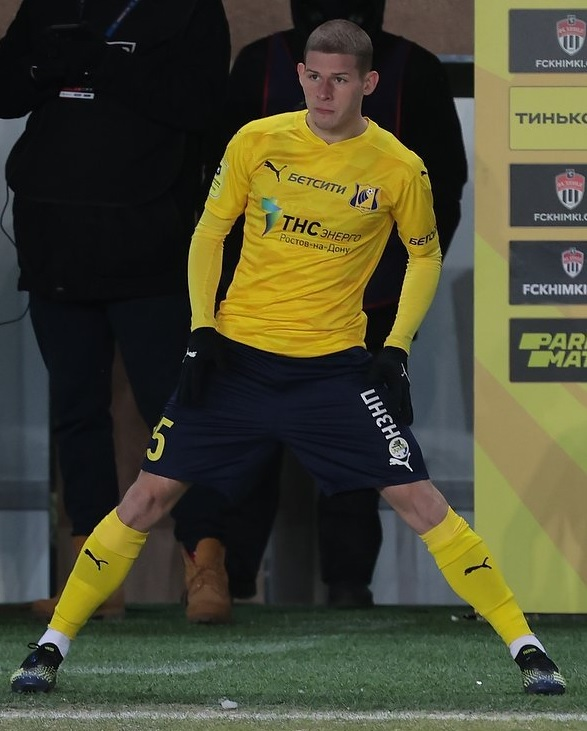
- Folmer with Rostov in 2021

Personal information
- Full name: Kirill Alekseyevich Folmer
- Date of birth: 25 February 2000 (age 26)
- Place of birth: Engels, Russia
- Height: 1.78 m (5 ft 10 in)
- Position: Midfielder

Team information
- Current team: Volga Ulyanovsk
- Number: 9

Youth career
- –2011: DYuSSh Yunost Engels
- 2011–2019: Spartak Moscow

Senior career*
Years	Team	Apps	(Gls)
2018–2019	Spartak-2 Moscow	15	(2)
2019–2021	Ufa	13	(0)
2019–2020	Ufa-2	5	(1)
2021–2023	Rostov	21	(0)
2022–2023	→ Akhmat Grozny (loan)	3	(0)
2023	→ Baltika Kaliningrad (loan)	11	(1)
2023–2024	Volgar Astrakhan	11	(0)
2024–2025	Sibir Novosibirsk	33	(4)
2025–	Volga Ulyanovsk	21	(5)
- * Club domestic league appearances and goals as of 16 May 2026

Kirill Alekseyevich Folmer (Russian: Кирилл Алексеевич Фольмер; born 25 February 2000) is a Russian professional footballer who plays in the right midfielder position for Volga Ulyanovsk. He can also play as a central midfielder or attacking midfielder.

== Club career ==
He made his debut in the Russian Football National League for Spartak-2 Moscow on 11 March 2019 in a game against Zenit-2 St. Petersburg.

On 13 August 2019, he signed a long-term contract with Ufa. He made his Russian Premier League debut for Ufa on 9 August 2020 in a game against Krasnodar, he substituted Igor Bezdenezhnykh in the 68th minute.

On 25 February 2021, he moved to Rostov in exchange for the rights to Konstantin Pliyev.

On 16 July 2022, Folmer joined Akhmat Grozny on loan. On 1 February 2023, he moved on a new loan to Baltika Kaliningrad.

On 7 July 2023, Folmer signed with Volgar Astrakhan.

== Career statistics ==
As of 28 November 2022

Club	Season	League			Cup		Continental		Other		Total	
Club	Season	Division	Apps	Goals	Apps	Goals	Apps	Goals	Apps	Goals	Apps	Goals
Spartak-2 Moscow	2018–19	FNL	12	2	–		–		5 (Note: Appearances in the FNL Cup)	1	17	3
Spartak-2 Moscow	2019–20	FNL	3	0	–		–		–		3	0
Spartak-2 Moscow	Total		15	2	0	0	0	0	5	1	20	3
Ufa-2	2019–20	PFL	5	1	–		–		–		5	1
Ufa	2019–20	RPL	0	0	0	0	–		–		0	0
Ufa	2020–21	RPL	13	0	2	0	–		–		15	0
Ufa	Total		13	0	2	0	0	0	0	0	15	0
Rostov	2020–21	RPL	6	0	–		–		–		6	0
Rostov	2021–22	RPL	15	0	2	0	–		–		17	0
Rostov	Total		21	0	2	0	0	0	0	0	23	0
Akhmat Grozny	2022–23	RPL	3	0	4	1	–		–		7	1
Career total			57	3	8	1	0	0	5	1	70	5
