= Anuchino =

Anuchino may refer to:

- Anuchino, Nizhny Novgorod Oblast, a village in Nizhny Novgorod Oblast, Russia
- Anuchino, Penza Oblast, a village (selo) in Penza Oblast, Russia
- Anuchino, Primorsky Krai, a village (selo) in Primorsky Krai, Russia
