= Maksim Kiselyov =

Russian footballer

Personal information
- Full name: Maksim Vadimovich Kiselyov
- Date of birth: 30 January 1995 (age 31)
- Place of birth: Saratov, Russia
- Height: 1.85 m (6 ft 1 in)
- Position: Goalkeeper

Team information
- Current team: FC Sibir Novosibirsk

Senior career*
Years	Team	Apps	(Gls)
2014–2015	FC Sokol Saratov	0	(0)
2015–2016	FC Sibir-2 Novosibirsk	10	(0)
2016–2019	FC Sibir Novosibirsk	13	(0)
2019–2020	FC Chayka Peschanokopskoye	12	(0)
2020–2021	FC Tekstilshchik Ivanovo	2	(0)
2021–	FC Sibir Novosibirsk	113	(0)
- * Club domestic league appearances and goals as of 15 November 2026

Maksim Vadimovich Kiselyov (Russian: Максим Вадимович Киселёв; born 30 January 1995) is a Russian football player who plays for FC Sibir Novosibirsk.

== Club career ==
He made his debut in the Russian Professional Football League for FC Sibir-2 Novosibirsk on 22 September 2015 in a game against FC Yakutiya Yakutsk.

He made his Russian Football National League debut for FC Sibir Novosibirsk on 3 March 2019 in a game against FC Tyumen.
