= Daniil Petrunin =

Russian footballer

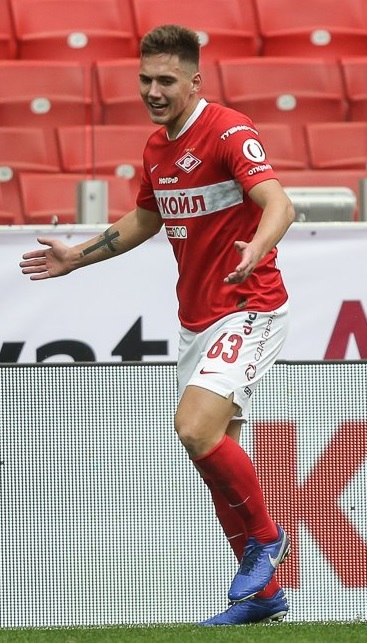
- Petrunin with Spartak-2 in 2019

Personal information
- Full name: Daniil Pavlovich Petrunin
- Date of birth: 10 June 1999 (age 27)
- Place of birth: Tolyatti, Russia
- Height: 1.85 m (6 ft 1 in)
- Position: Defender

Team information
- Current team: FC Sibir Novosibirsk
- Number: 3

Youth career
- FC Spartak Moscow

Senior career*
| Years | Team | Apps | (Gls) |
| 2018–2022 | FC Spartak-2 Moscow | 97 | (1) |
| 2020 | FC Spartak Moscow | 0 | (0) |
| 2022–2023 | FC Shinnik Yaroslavl | 6 | (0) |
| 2023–2025 | FC Veles Moscow | 55 | (1) |
| 2025– | FC Sibir Novosibirsk | 43 | (0) |

International career
| 2014 | Russia U-15 | 2 | (0) |
| 2014–2015 | Russia U-16 | 5 | (0) |
- * Club domestic league appearances and goals as of 15 November 2026

Daniil Pavlovich Petrunin (Russian: Даниил Павлович Петрунин; born 10 June 1999) is a Russian football player who plays for FC Sibir Novosibirsk.

== Club career ==
He made his debut in the Russian Football National League for FC Spartak-2 Moscow on 17 July 2018 in a game against PFC Sochi.

He made his debut for the main squad of FC Spartak Moscow on 21 October 2020 in a Russian Cup game against FC Yenisey Krasnoyarsk.
