= Varfolomeyevka (air base) =

Russian air base within Primorsky Krai

Varfolomeyevka
- Arsenyev, Primorsky Krai in Russia
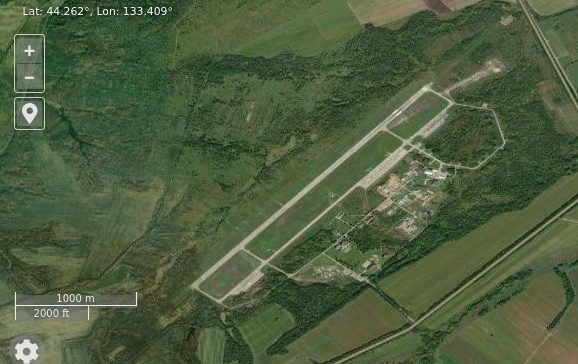
- Satellite imagery of Varfolomeyevka air base

Site information
- Type: Air Base
- Owner: Ministry of Defence
- Operator: Russian Aerospace Forces

Location
- Shown within Primorsky Krai Varfolomeyevka (Russia)
- Coordinates: 44°15′43″N 133°24′33″E

Site history
- Built: 1960
- In use: 1960 - present

Airfield information
- Identifiers: ICAO: UHIF
- Elevation: 173 metres (568 ft) AMSL
Runways
Direction	Length and surface
05/23	2,500 metres (8,202 ft) Concrete

Varfolomeyevka (also given as Varfolomeyevka South) is an air base in Primorsky Krai, Russia. During the 1980s it was one of 17 tactical reconnaissance aircraft bases in the Soviet Union, and one of two such bases in the Far East region along with its sister base Vozzhayevka.

The base is home to the 799th Independent Reconnaissance Aviation Squadron flying the Sukhoi Su-24MR (NATO: Fencer).

During the 1960s the primary aircraft assigned were Ilyushin Il-28R (NATO: Beagle). By 1984 the aircraft had been modernized with 20 to 30 Yakovlev Yak-28R (NATO: Brewer-D/E) and 2 to 16 Mikoyan-Gurevich MiG-21R (NATO: Fishbed-H) reconnaissance jets. During the 1980s the Soviet Union was replacing these aging aircraft with its third-generation tactical reconnaissance aircraft, the Sukhoi Su-17MR (NATO: Fitter), but it is unknown whether any were assigned to Varfolomeyevka.

In the first decade of the 21st century the airfield hosted regiments of the Russian 11th Air and Air Defence Forces Army.

An unpaved airfield given as Varfolomeyevka Southwest (44°16′45″N 133°24′38″E) existed 2 km north of Varfolomeyevka South in 1960s Western intelligence documents and was still visible in 1984 Landsat imagery.

== See also ==
- List of military airbases in Russia
