= Anuchinsky District =

Anuchinsky District Анучинский район (Russian)
- District
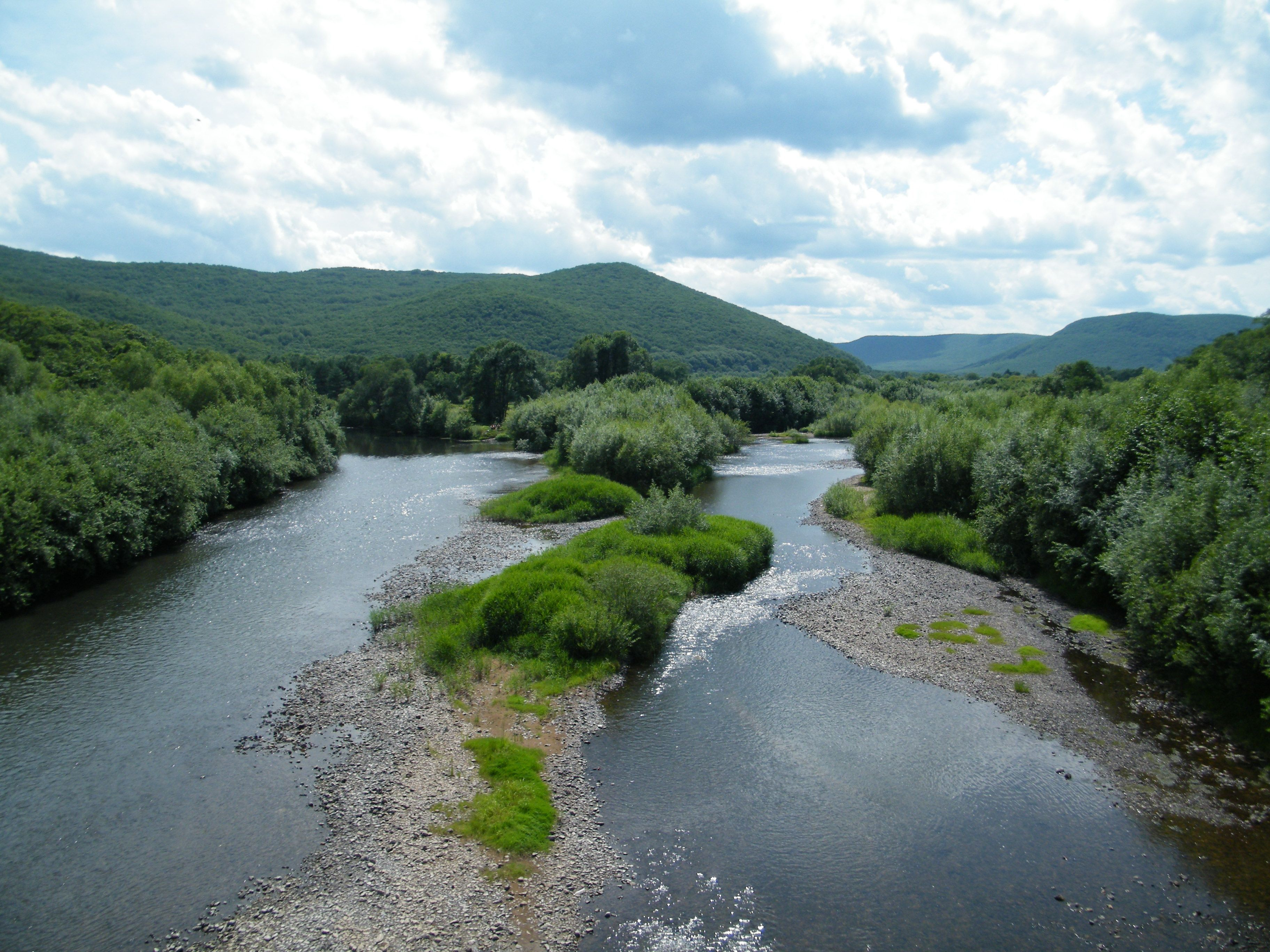
- The Arsenyevka River near the selo of Anuchino in Anuchinsky District

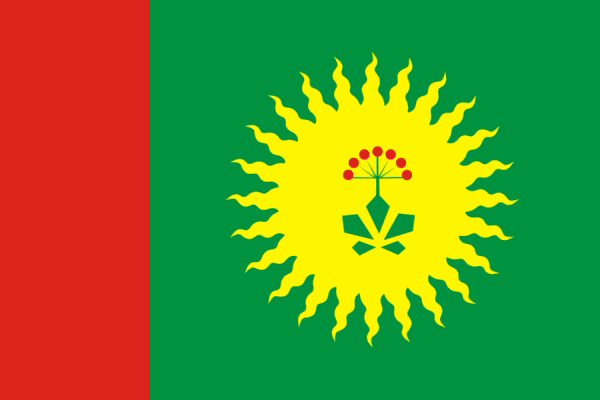
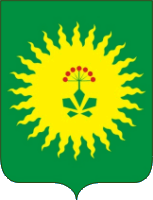
- Flag Coat of arms
- Location of Anuchinsky District in Primorsky Krai
- Coordinates: 43°59′N 133°07′E
- Country: Russia
- Federal subject: Primorsky Krai
- Established: March 23, 1935
- Administrative center: Anuchino

Area
  - Total: 3,796.4 km^{2} (1,465.8 sq mi)

Population (2010 Census)
  - Total: 14,613
  - Density: 3.8492/km^{2} (9.9693/sq mi)
  - Urban: 0%
  - Rural: 100%

Administrative structure
  - Inhabited localities: 29 rural localities

Municipal structure
  - Municipally incorporated as: Anuchinsky Municipal District
  - Municipal divisions: 0 urban settlements, 4 rural settlements
- Time zone: UTC+10 (MSK+7)
- OKTMO ID: 05602000
- Website: http://mo.primorsky.ru/anuchinsky/

Anuchinsky District (Russian: Ану́чинский райо́н) is an administrative and municipal district (raion), one of the twenty-two in Primorsky Krai, Russia. It is located in the south of the krai and borders with Spassky District in the north, Yakovlevsky District and the territory of Arsenyev Town Under Krai Jurisdiction in the northeast, Chuguyevsky District in the east, Partizansky District in the southeast, the territory of Partizansk Town Under Krai Jurisdiction in the south and southeast, Shkotovsky District in the south and southwest, and with Mikhaylovsky and Chernigovsky Districts in the west. The area of the district is 3,769.4 square kilometers (1,455.4 sq mi). Its administrative center is the rural locality (a selo) of Anuchino. Population: 14,613 (2010 census); 16,010 (2002 census); 18,187 (1989 Soviet census). The population of Anuchino accounts for 30.5% of the district's total population.

== Geography ==
The district is located in humid continental climate zone where the Sikhote-Alin mountains and plains of Khanka lowlands come together. As a result, the area has rich flora and fauna.

== Economy ==
Agriculture is characterized by potato, vegetables, rice, cereals, and panax growth. Milk and meat cattle breeding is very developed in district.

== Notable residents ==
- Svetlana Goryacheva (born 1947), politician, born in the village of Risovy
- Petro Oliynyk (1957–2011), Ukrainian miner and politician, born in Novovarvarovka
