= 2024–25 FC Shinnik Yaroslavl season =

FC Shinnik Yaroslavl
2024–25 season
- Stadium: Shinnik Stadium
- Russian First League: 18th
- Russian Cup: Pre-season

The 2024–25 season is the 68th season in the history of FC Shinnik Yaroslavl, and the club's third consecutive season in the Russian First League. In addition to the domestic league, the team is scheduled to participate in the Russian Cup.

== Competitions ==
=== Overall record ===
Competition	First match	Last match	Starting round	Record							
Competition	First match	Last match	Starting round	Pld	W	D	L	GF	GA	GD	Win %
Russian First League	14 July 2024		Matchday 1	4	0	0	4	1	7	−6	0.00
Russian Cup				0	0	0	0	0	0	+0	—
Total				4	0	0	4	1	7	−6	0.00

Last updated: 4 August 2024
Source: Soccerway

=== Russian First League ===
==== League table ====
Pos	Team	Pld	W	D	L	GF	GA	GD	Pts
12	Neftekhimik Nizhnekamsk	34	9	11	14	31	37	−6	38 (Note: Ranked on head-to-head points (KAMAZ 6, Neftekhimik 5, Chayka 4))
13	Chayka Peschanokopskoye	34	8	14	12	31	43	−12	38
14	Shinnik Yaroslavl	34	8	11	15	24	42	−18	35 (Note: Ranked on head-to-head goal difference (Shinnik +1, Ufa –1))
15	Ufa	34	9	8	17	32	48	−16	35
16	Sokol Saratov (Note: Sokol was not relegated despite finishing in the relegation spot, as Khimki which was administratively relegated from Premier League to the First League was later dissolved, with Sokol replacing them in the First League)	34	7	11	16	25	41	−16	32

Source: Soccerway
Rules for classification: 1) Points; 2) Head-to-head points; 3) Head-to-head matches won; 4) Head-to-head goal difference; 5) Head-to-head goals scored; 6) Head-to-head away goals scored; 7) Matches won; 8) Goal difference; 9) Goals scored; 10) Away matches won; 11) Away goals scored; 12) Best disciplinary record (3 points for red card, 1 point for yellow card); 13) Drawing lots. If teams tied on points did not play an equal number of head-to-head games, head-to-head criteria and disciplinary record are not used for positioning. If 1st- and 2nd-placed teams are tied in the final standings on the first 12 criteria, a winner is determined in an additional play-off game, with no extra time and a penalty-shootout if tied at the end of regulation, instead of drawing lots.

==== Results summary ====
Overall								Home						Away					
Pld	W	D	L	GF	GA	GD	Pts	W	D	L	GF	GA	GD	W	D	L	GF	GA	GD
4	0	0	4	1	7	−6	0	0	0	3	0	5	−5	0	0	1	1	2	−1

Last updated: 4 August 2024.

==== Results by round ====
Round	1	2	3	4	5
Ground	H	A	H	H	A
Result	L	L	L	L	
Position	14	14	18	18	

Updated to match(es) played on 4 August 2024. Source:
A = Away; H = Home; W = Win; D = Draw; L = Loss

==== Matches ====
The tentative match schedule was released on 27 June.

14 July 2024 1	Shinnik Yaroslavl	0–1	Rotor Volgograd	Yaroslavl
16:00 UTC+3			Prishchepa 14'	Stadium: Shinnik Stadium; Attendance: 2,682; Referee: Inal Tanashev

20 July 2024 2	Ural Yekaterinburg	2–1	Shinnik Yaroslavl	Yekaterinburg
12:30 UTC+3	Miškić 83' (pen.); Begić 89'		Samoylov 40' (pen.)	Stadium: Central Stadium; Attendance: 8,956; Referee: Konstantin Averyanov

28 July 2024 3	Shinnik Yaroslavl	0–2	Tyumen	Yaroslavl
18:30 UTC+3			Kenfack 60'; Korotayev 90+4'	Stadium: Shinnik Stadium; Attendance: 2,823; Referee: Maxim Perezva

4 August 2024 4	Shinnik Yaroslavl	0–2	Sochi	Yaroslavl
17:30 UTC+3			Marcelo Alves 18' (pen.); Bart 54'	Stadium: Shinnik Stadium; Attendance: 2,501; Referee: Anton Frolov

10 August 2024 5	SKA-Khabarovsk	v	Shinnik Yaroslavl	Ramenskoye
16:00 UTC+3				Stadium: Saturn Stadium
