= Anton Krotov =

Russian footballer

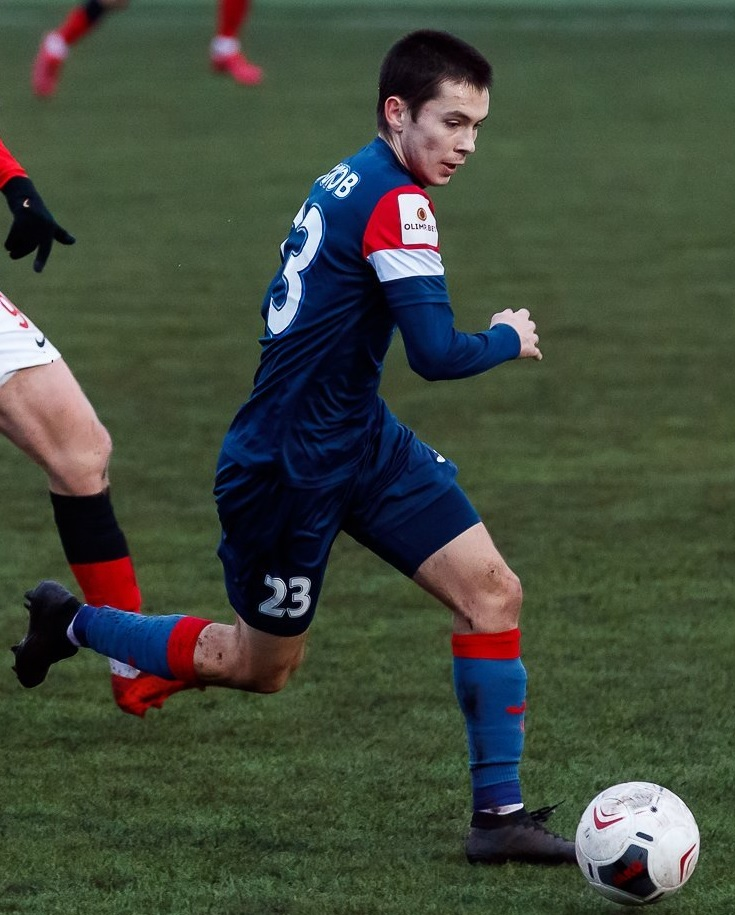
- Krotov with Irtysh Omsk in 2020

Personal information
- Full name: Anton Alekseyevich Krotov
- Date of birth: 28 January 1998 (age 28)
- Place of birth: Arsenyev, Primorsky Krai, Russia
- Height: 1.70 m (5 ft 7 in)
- Position: Defensive midfielder

Team information
- Current team: FC Sibir Novosibirsk
- Number: 23

Youth career
- –2016: FC Luch Vladivostok

Senior career*
Years	Team	Apps	(Gls)
2016–2020	FC Luch Vladivostok	35	(1)
2020–2021	FC Irtysh Omsk	37	(3)
2021–2022	FC Sokol Saratov	29	(3)
2022–2023	FC Volga Ulyanovsk	6	(0)
2023–2024	FC Sibir Novosibirsk	15	(0)
2025–	FC Sibir Novosibirsk	24	(2)
- * Club domestic league appearances and goals as of 15 November 2026

Anton Alekseyevich Krotov (Russian: Антон Алексеевич Кротов; born 28 January 1998) is a Russian football player who plays for FC Sibir Novosibirsk.

== Club career ==
He made his debut in the Russian Football National League for Luch Vladivostok on 14 November 2018 in a game against Baltika Kaliningrad.
