= Konstantin Pliyev =

Russian footballer

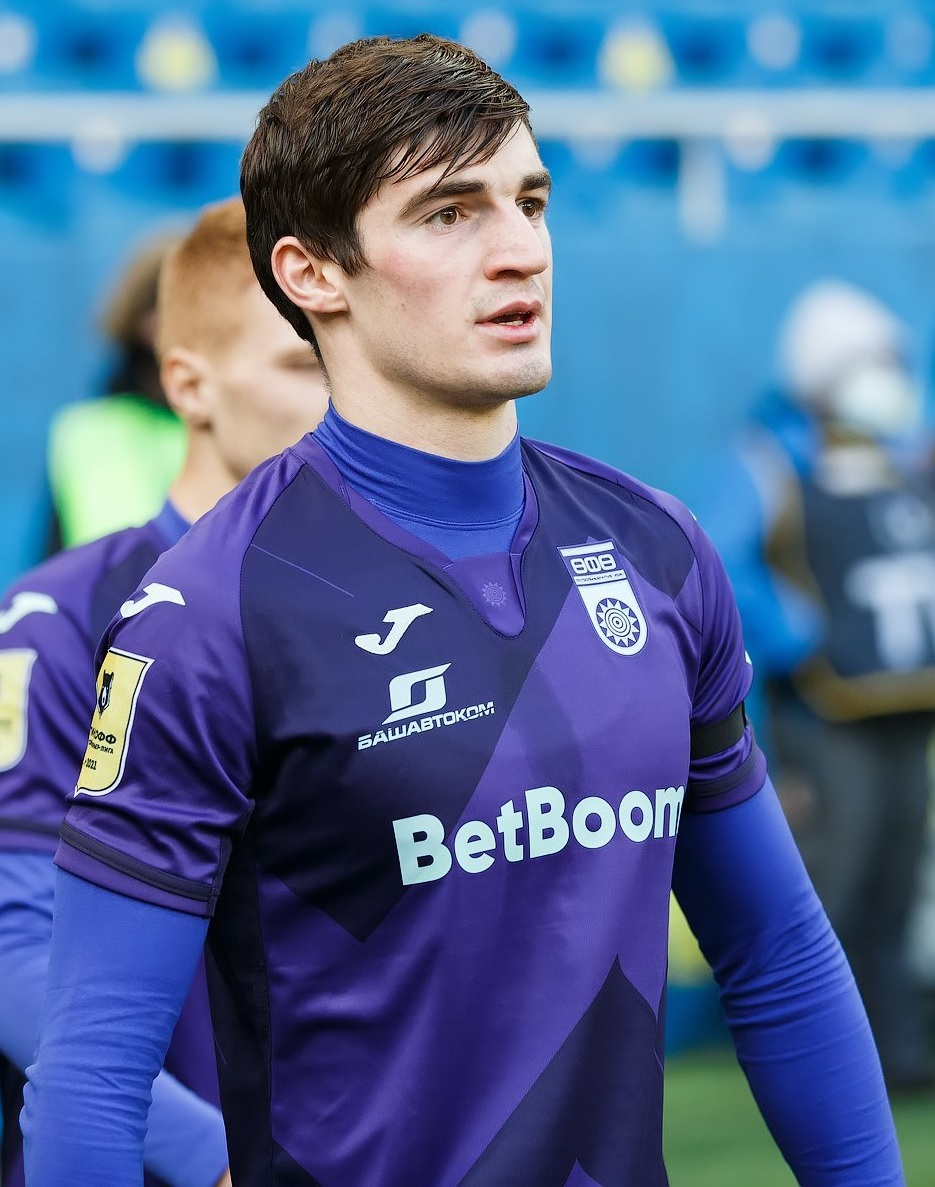
- Pliyev with FC Ufa in 2020

Personal information
- Full name: Konstantin Igorevich Pliyev
- Date of birth: 26 October 1996 (age 30)
- Place of birth: Vladikavkaz, Russia
- Height: 1.86 m (6 ft 1 in)
- Position: Centre-back

Senior career*
Years	Team	Apps	(Gls)
2013–2015	FC Alania Vladikavkaz	39	(1)
2016–2018	FC Volgar Astrakhan	43	(1)
2018–2021	FC Rostov	5	(0)
2018	→ FC Baltika Kaliningrad (loan)	21	(0)
2019–2020	→ FC Rubin Kazan (loan)	12	(0)
2020–2021	→ FC Ufa (loan)	9	(0)
2021–2022	FC Ufa	52	(2)
2022–2025	FC Alania Vladikavkaz	49	(0)
2025–2026	FC SKA-Khabarovsk	21	(0)
- * Club domestic league appearances and goals as of 30 August 2026

Konstantin Igorevich Pliyev (Russian: Константин Игоревич Плиев; born 26 October 1996) is a Russian football player who plays as centre-back.

== Club career ==
He made his professional debut in the Russian Professional Football League for FC Alania Vladikavkaz on 12 August 2014 in a game against FC Anzhi-2 Makhachkala.

His loan by FC Baltika Kaliningrad from FC Rostov was terminated on 25 December 2018.

On 9 July 2019, he joined FC Rubin Kazan on loan for the 2019–20 season.

On 25 September 2020, he was loaned to FC Ufa for the 2020–21 season.

On 25 February 2021, he moved to Ufa permanently in exchange to Kirill Folmer going in the opposite direction.

== Career statistics ==
As of 28 May 2022

Club	Season	League			Cup		Continental		Other		Total	
Club	Season	Division	Apps	Goals	Apps	Goals	Apps	Goals	Apps	Goals	Apps	Goals
Alania Vladikavkaz	2014–15	PFL	22	1	0	0	–		–		22	1
Alania Vladikavkaz	2015–16	PFL	17	0	1	0	–		–		18	0
Alania Vladikavkaz	Total		39	1	1	0	0	0	0	0	40	1
Volgar Astrakhan	2015–16	FNL	2	0	–		–		3 (Note: Appearances in the FNL Cup)	0	5	0
Volgar Astrakhan	2016–17	FNL	26	1	2	0	–		3	0	31	1
Volgar Astrakhan	2017–18	FNL	15	0	1	0	–		–		16	0
Volgar Astrakhan	Total		43	1	3	0	0	0	6	0	52	1
Rostov	2017–18	RPL	1	0	–		–		–		1	0
Rostov	2018–19	RPL	4	0	1	0	–		–		5	0
Rostov	Total		5	0	1	0	0	0	0	0	6	0
Baltika Kaliningrad (loan)	2018–19	FNL	21	0	2	0	–		–		23	0
Rubin Kazan	2019–20	RPL	12	0	1	0	–		–		13	0
Ufa	2020–21	RPL	17	0	3	0	–		–		20	0
Ufa	2021–22	RPL	28	0	2	0	–		2 (Note: Appearances in the relegation play-offs)	0	32	0
Ufa	Total		45	0	5	0	0	0	2	0	52	0
Career total			165	2	13	0	0	0	8	0	186	2

== Personal life ==
His older brother Zaurbek Pliyev is also a football player.
