= Danila Molodnyakov =

Russian footballer (born 2002)

Personal information
- Full name: Danila Alekseyevich Molodnyakov
- Date of birth: 4 January 2002 (age 24)
- Place of birth: Krymsk, Russia
- Height: 1.89 m (6 ft 2 1/2 in)
- Position: Defender

Youth career
- FC Kuban Krasnodar
- Chertanovo Education Center

Senior career*
Years	Team	Apps	(Gls)
2018–2019	FC Chertanovo-2 Moscow	10	(1)
2020–2024	FC Chertanovo Moscow	93	(0)
2025	FC Irkutsk	7	(0)

International career^{‡}
2017	Russia U-15	4	(0)
2017	Russia U-16	4	(0)
- * Club domestic league appearances and goals as of 2 November 2025 ‡ National team caps and goals as of 26 August 2017

Danila Alekseyevich Molodnyakov (Russian: Данила Алексеевич Молодняков; born 4 January 2002) is a Russian football player.

== Club career ==
He made his debut in the Russian Football National League for FC Chertanovo Moscow on 8 August 2020 in a game against FC Tom Tomsk, he substituted Dmitri Redkovich in added time.
