= Yakovlevka, Primorsky Krai =

Rural locality in Primorsky Krai, Russia

Coordinates: 44°25′36″N 133°28′43″E

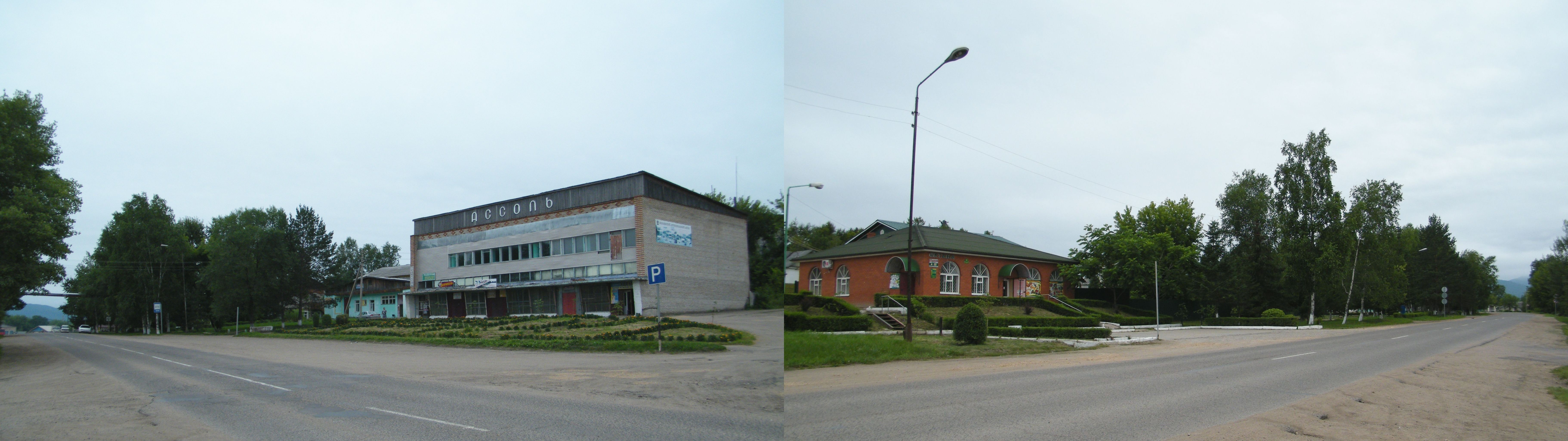
Yakovlevka Street Views

Yakovlevka (Russian: Яковлевка) is a rural locality (a selo) and the administrative center of Yakovlevsky District, Primorsky Krai, Russia. Population: 4,480 (2010 census); 5,118 (2002 census); 5,345 (1989 Soviet census).
