= Dmitri Redkovich =

Russian footballer (born 1998)

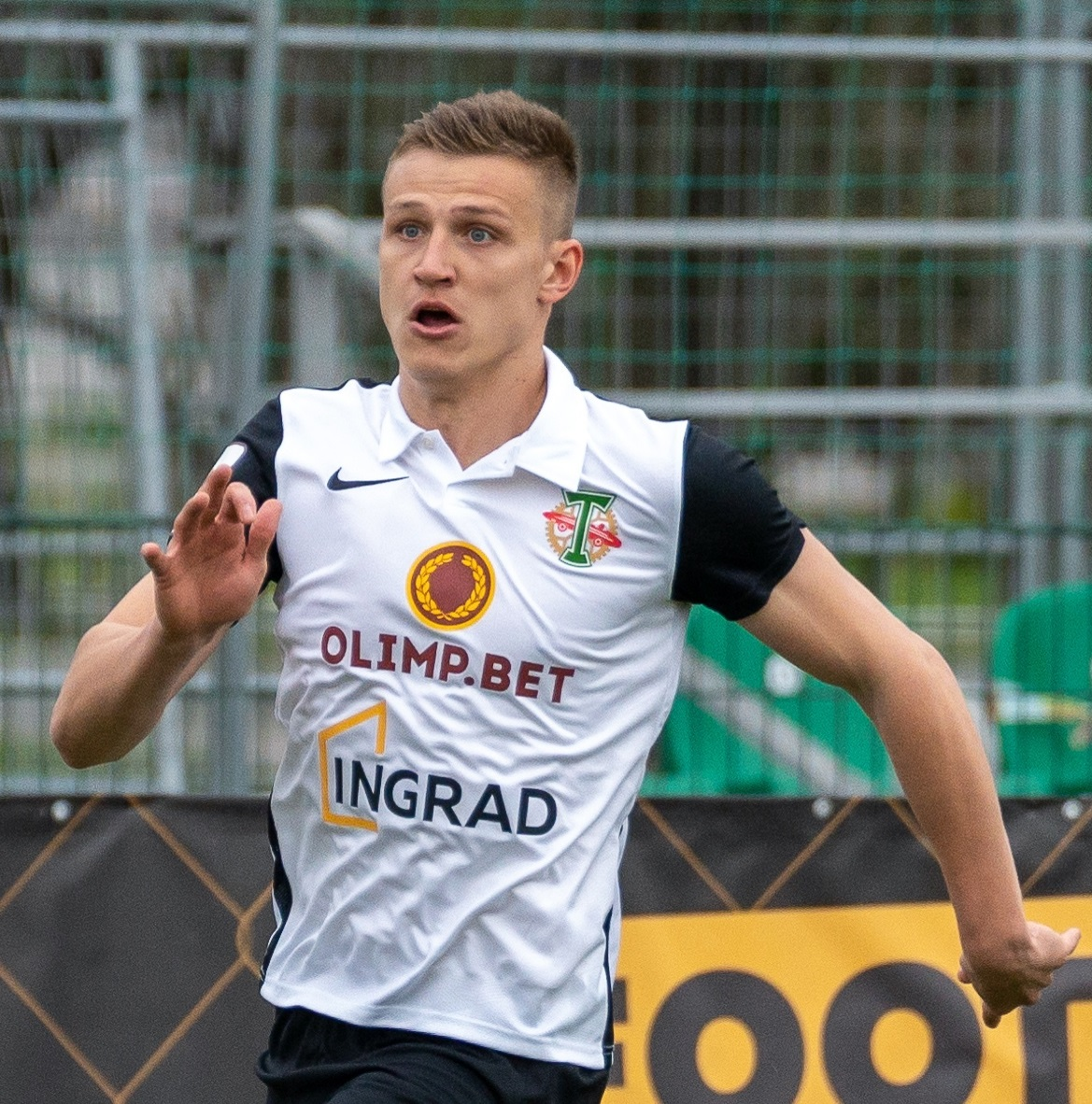
- Redkovich with Torpedo Moscow in 2021

Personal information
- Full name: Dmitri Pavlovich Redkovich
- Date of birth: 15 January 1998 (age 28)
- Place of birth: Moscow, Russia
- Height: 1.83 m (6 ft 0 in)
- Position: Defender

Team information
- Current team: FC Sibir Novosibirsk
- Number: 4

Youth career
- 2008–2016: FC Chertanovo Moscow

Senior career*
Years	Team	Apps	(Gls)
2016–2020	FC Chertanovo Moscow	85	(5)
2018–2019	→ FC Chertanovo-2 Moscow	5	(0)
2020–2022	FC Torpedo Moscow	12	(0)
2021–2022	→ FC Metallurg Lipetsk (loan)	26	(0)
2022–2023	FC Chertanovo Moscow	37	(2)
2024–	FC Sibir Novosibirsk	90	(3)
- * Club domestic league appearances and goals as of 15 November 2026

Dmitri Pavlovich Redkovich (Russian: Дмитрий Павлович Редькович; born 15 January 1998) is a Russian football player who plays for FC Sibir Novosibirsk.

== Club career ==
He made his debut in the Russian Professional Football League for FC Chertanovo Moscow on 20 July 2016 in a game against FC Torpedo Moscow. He made his Russian Football National League debut for FC Chertanovo Moscow on 17 July 2018 in a game against FC Rotor Volgograd.
