= Arsenyev =

Town in Primorsky Krai, Russia

Arsenyev Арсеньев
- Town
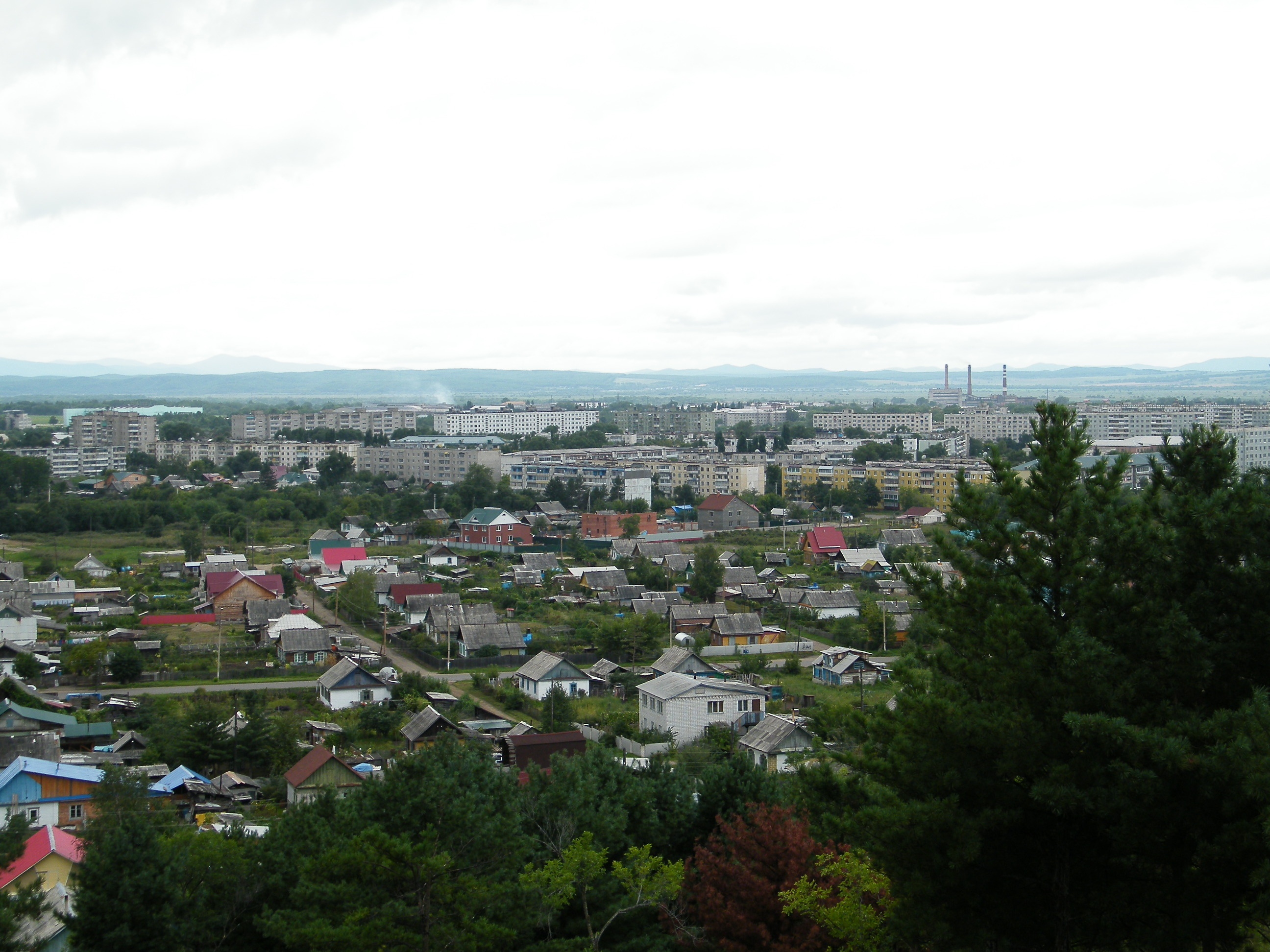
- View of Arsenyev

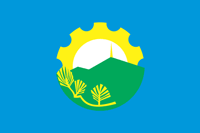
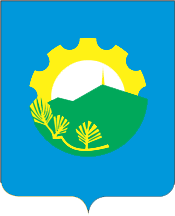
- Flag Coat of arms
- Interactive map of Arsenyev
- Location of Arsenyev Arsenyev (Primorsky Krai)
- Coordinates: 44°10′N 133°15′E
- Country: Russia
- Federal subject: Primorsky Krai
- Founded: 1895

Government
  - Head: Alexander Dronin
- Elevation: 170 m (560 ft)

Population (2010 Census)
  - Total: 56,750
  - Estimate (2025): 46,543 (−18%)
  - Rank: 291st in 2010

Administrative status
  - Subordinated to: Arsenyev Town Under Krai Jurisdiction
  - Capital of: Arsenyev Town Under Krai Jurisdiction

Municipal status
  - Urban okrug: Arsenyevsky Urban Okrug
  - Capital of: Arsenyevsky Urban Okrug
- Time zone: UTC+10 (MSK+7)
- Postal codes: 692330, 692331, 692335, 692337, 692338, 692342–692346, 692348, 692679, 692688
- Dialing code: +7 42361
- OKTMO ID: 05703000001
- Website: ars.town

Arsenyev population
- 2010 Census: 56,750
- 2002 Census: 62,896
- 1989 Census: 70,032
- 1979 Census: 60,097

Arsenyev (Russian: Арсе́ньев) is a town in Primorsky Krai, Russia, located about 160 kilometers (99 mi) northeast of Vladivostok, the administrative center of the krai. As of the 2010 Census, its population was 56,750. It was known as Semyonovka until 1952.

== History ==
The history of Arsenyev begins in 1895, when the settlement of Semyonovka (Семёновка) was founded. The first settlement dwellers were the Old Believers. In 1901, migrant peasants from what is now Poltava Oblast, Ukraine settled here. In 1937, the settlement was connected to the Trans-Siberian Railway by a branch-line. In 1940, the first aviation plant in the Russian Far East, which is now called Progress Arsenyev Aircraft Works, was built in Semyonovka. In 1952, Semyonovka was granted town status and renamed Arsenyev, after Vladimir Arsenyev, an explorer of the Far East, a scientist, a traveler, and a writer, who visited Semyonovka in 1912.

During the Cold War, an air base existed northeast of Arsenyev at Varfolomeyevka.

== Administrative and municipal status ==
Within the framework of administrative divisions, it is incorporated as Arsenyev Town Under Krai Jurisdiction—an administrative unit with the status equal to that of the districts. As a municipal division, Arsenyev Town Under Krai Jurisdiction is incorporated as Arsenyevsky Urban Okrug.

== Geography ==
=== Climate ===
Arsenyev has a dry-winter warm-summer humid continental climate (Köppen climate classification: Dwb), bordering on a dry-winter hot-summer humid continental climate (Köppen climate classification: Dwa).

The climate of the town is characterized by a great contrast between summer and winter temperatures in comparison with the coastal Primorye. The average temperature in January is −18 °C (0 °F). The average temperature in July is +21 °C (70 °F). The absolute low recorded was −46 °C (−51 °F), record high was +39 °C (102 °F). Spring is characterized by an increase of 10 °C (18 °F) in the average daily temperature from March through April. The annual precipitation is 701 millimeters (27.6 in); the annual humidity is 71%. The soil freezes as deep as 2 meters (6 ft 7 in).

Climate data for Arsenyev
| Month | Jan | Feb | Mar | Apr | May | Jun | Jul | Aug | Sep | Oct | Nov | Dec | Year |
|---|---|---|---|---|---|---|---|---|---|---|---|---|---|
| Mean daily maximum °C (°F) | −10.2 (13.6) | −5.5 (22.1) | 2.2 (36.0) | 13.3 (55.9) | 20.2 (68.4) | 24.1 (75.4) | 26.8 (80.2) | 25.9 (78.6) | 21.0 (69.8) | 13.5 (56.3) | 2.2 (36.0) | −8.0 (17.6) | 10.5 (50.8) |
| Daily mean °C (°F) | −17.5 (0.5) | −12.9 (8.8) | −3.8 (25.2) | 6.7 (44.1) | 13.3 (55.9) | 18.4 (65.1) | 21.9 (71.4) | 21.3 (70.3) | 14.9 (58.8) | 6.7 (44.1) | −3.9 (25.0) | −14.6 (5.7) | 4.2 (39.6) |
| Mean daily minimum °C (°F) | −24.8 (−12.6) | −20.8 (−5.4) | −9.8 (14.4) | 0.1 (32.2) | 6.4 (43.5) | 12.7 (54.9) | 17.0 (62.6) | 16.7 (62.1) | 8.8 (47.8) | −0.1 (31.8) | −10.0 (14.0) | −21.2 (−6.2) | −2.1 (28.3) |
| Average precipitation mm (inches) | 11.2 (0.44) | 9.1 (0.36) | 19.3 (0.76) | 30.4 (1.20) | 58.5 (2.30) | 70.7 (2.78) | 102.8 (4.05) | 138.6 (5.46) | 90.3 (3.56) | 57.1 (2.25) | 29.2 (1.15) | 13.3 (0.52) | 630.5 (24.83) |

=== Nature ===
Large clay deposits that are used by the local plant of construction materials are found in the town's vicinity. There are granite and basalt beds within 10–12 kilometers (6.2–7.5 mi) distance from the town. The suburban flora includes Japanese Yew (Taxus cuspidata), Amur Velvet, Manchurian Walnut (Juglans mandschurica), Ermann's Birch (Betula ermannii), Eleutherococcus, Lotus (Nelumbo nucifera, a rare and very beautiful water-plant that can be found in several small lakes twelve kilometers from Arsenyev). There is a variety of fauna species in the area, including mammals, birds, and insects characteristic of Primorye. The tiger (Panthera tigris), wildcat (Felis spp.), mandarin duck (Aix galericulata), several species of unique butterflies including Catocala and species of Noctuid moth can be found.

There is much snow during winter in Arsenyev, and this creates perfect conditions for skiing around the town. Arsenyev is surrounded by an almost untouched Ussuri taiga. The ecological situation in Arsenyev is more favorable in comparison with other cities and towns of the krai, due to the absence of polluting enterprises in the town and its suburbs.

== Economy ==
As of 1999, the economy of the town is dominated by state enterprises. The proportion of their employees comprises two-thirds of able-bodied population. Other industries employ an additional 12,000 people. There are about 4,000 unemployed in Arsenyev. The largest enterprise of the town are Askold Shipbuilding Plant and Progress, producing generally products for defense. At present the volume of the output has been lowered due to the reduction of demand for military products. The high prices of raw materials have led to a halt in the production of umbrellas, furniture, and baby prams, that were by-products of Askold and Progress. All of this constitutes a threat to unemployment to most of the town population, which has been employed by these two plants. One possible solution to the problem is exporting military helicopters of Progress Stock Company, which have received worldwide approval. Due to the highly technical industries located there, Arsenyev is characterized by a larger proportion of specialists with higher education compared with other cities of the Krai.

== Tourism ==
Arsenyev is situated between the Blue and Eastern-Blue Ranges of the Sikhote-Alin, on the right bank of the Arsenyevka river (the Ussuri's tributary). The river is 294 km (200 mi) long. The valley of the Arsenyevka river is 2–3-kilometer (1.2–1.9 mi) wide. The river is the source of water for the town and for the rice plantations of the adjacent Anuchinsky District. In 1954, a dam was constructed on the Dachnaya River (the Arsenyevka's tributary). It is located in the center of Arsenyev, forming a pool with fountains. The town park is adjacent to it. This is the favorite recreation place of the town's residents. The water reservoir for the town is located on the upper reaches of the Dachnaya river. The town of Arsenyev is built on flat land.

Arsenyev is an attraction primarily for lovers of mountain-skiing. There is a mountain-skiing base in Arsenyev. There is much snow in the Arsenyev area in winter. The mountain normally used for mountain skiers is 10 kilometers (6.2 mi) from the town and rises as high as 870 meters (2,850 ft) above sea level. Training for mountain-skiing beginners is available. Tourists are welcome on week-ends. You can stop at the Salyut recreation center at the foot of the mountain.

=== Sightseeing ===
There is a monument to Maxim Gorky, founded in 1958 in the public garden on Gorky Avenue.

The Uvalnaya Hill displays the monument to Russian explorer Vladimir Arsenyev and his guide gol'd Dersu Uzala, built in 1972 by donations from Arsenyev's residents.

In the area surrounding Arsenyev there are also many archaeological and natural monuments, acquainting visitors with the culture of the ancient tribes inhabiting these lands, with relics and endemic plants and animals.

Arsenyev's History Museum was opened in 1969. Over 40,000 exhibits are displayed, including the personal belongings of the first dwellers of Semyonovka, a collection of butterflies found in Central Primorye, ethnographic and archaeological collections. The museum attracts about 35,000 people a year.

== Sports ==
The bandy club Vostok plays in the second highest division, Supreme League.

== Notable residents ==
- Anton Krotov (born 1998), football player
- Maxim Kuzminov (born 1995), former helicopter pilot and defector
