= Ivan Kukushkin =

Russian footballer

Personal information
- Full name: Ivan Mikhailovich Kukushkin
- Date of birth: 24 July 2002 (age 24)
- Place of birth: Saint Petersburg, Russia
- Height: 1.96 m (6 ft 5 in)
- Position: Goalkeeper

Team information
- Current team: Baltika Kaliningrad
- Number: 81

Youth career
- –2019: Zenit Saint Petersburg

Senior career*
Years	Team	Apps	(Gls)
2020	Zenit-2 Saint Petersburg	3	(0)
2020	→ Zvezda Saint Petersburg (loan)	0	(0)
2021–2023	Ufa	18	(0)
2023–2025	Pari Nizhny Novgorod	1	(0)
2025	→ Baltika Kaliningrad (loan)	0	(0)
2025	→ Baltika-2 Kaliningrad (loan)	2	(0)
2025–	Baltika Kaliningrad	4	(0)
- * Club domestic league appearances and goals as of 27 April 2026

Ivan Mikhailovich Kukushkin (Russian: Иван Михайлович Кукушкин; born 24 July 2002) is a Russian football player who plays as a goalkeeper for Baltika Kaliningrad.

== Career ==
On 15 July 2023, Kukushkin signed a three-year contract with Russian Premier League club Pari Nizhny Novgorod. He made his debut for Pari on 4 October 2023 in a Russian Cup game against Krasnodar. He made his RPL debut for Pari on 9 December 2023 against Zenit St. Petersburg.

On 30 December 2024, Kukushkin joined Baltika Kaliningrad on loan with an option to buy. On 10 December 2025, Baltika made the transfer permanent and signed a two-and-a-half-year contract with Kukushkin.

== Career statistics ==
As of 27 April 2026

Club	Season	League			Cup		Other		Total	
Club	Season	Division	Apps	Goals	Apps	Goals	Apps	Goals	Apps	Goals
Zvezda St. Petersburg (loan)	2019–20	Russian Second League	0	0	—		—		0	0
Zenit-2 St. Petersburg	2020–21	Russian Second League	3	0	—		—		3	0
Ufa	2020–21	Russian Premier League	0	0	0	0	—		0	0
Ufa	2021–22	Russian Premier League	0	0	0	0	0	0	0	0
Ufa	2022–23	Russian First League	18	0	3	0	—		21	0
Ufa	Total		18	0	3	0	0	0	21	0
Pari Nizhny Novgorod	2023–24	Russian Premier League	1	0	2	0	0	0	3	0
Pari Nizhny Novgorod	2024–25	Russian Premier League	0	0	1	0	—		1	0
Pari Nizhny Novgorod	Total		1	0	3	0	0	0	4	0
Baltika Kaliningrad (loan)	2024–25	Russian First League	0	0	0	0	—		0	0
Baltika Kaliningrad (loan)	2025–26	Russian Premier League	0	0	3	0	—		3	0
Baltika Kaliningrad (loan)	Total		0	0	3	0	0	0	3	0
Baltika-2 Kaliningrad (loan)	2025	Russian Second League B	2	0	—		—		2	0
Baltika Kaliningrad	2025–26	Russian Premier League	4	0	1	0	—		5	0
Career total			28	0	10	0	0	0	38	0
