= Shinnik Stadium =

Football stadium in Yaroslavl, Russia

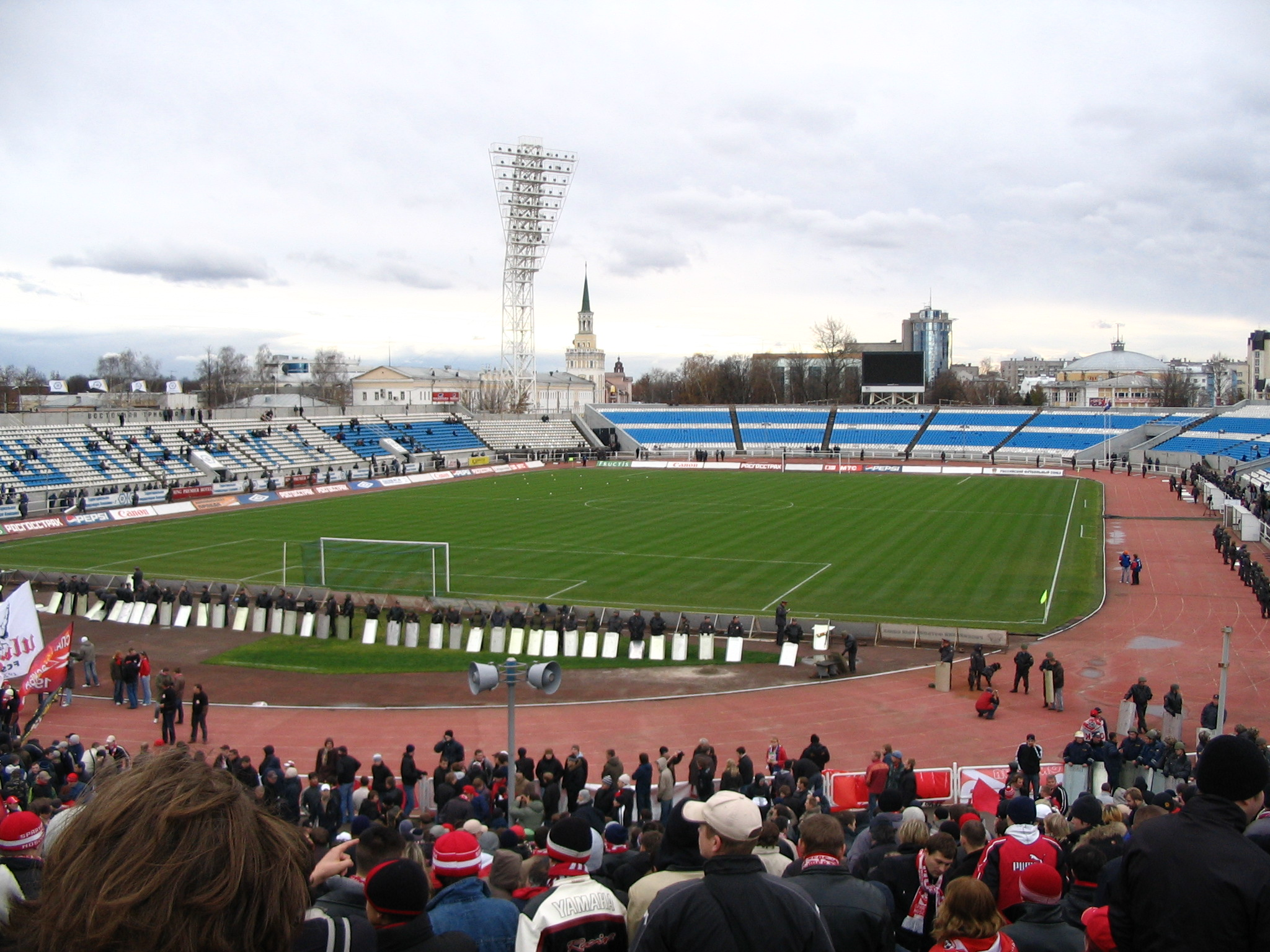
- FC Shinnik Yaroslavl vs Spartak Moscow, 2006
- Interactive map of Shinnik Stadium
- Location: Yaroslavl, Russia
- Coordinates: 57°37′43″N 39°52′03″E
- Owner: City of Yaroslavl
- Capacity: 22,990
- Surface: grass

Construction
- Built: 1923
- Opened: 1923
- Renovated: 2008-2010

Tenant
- FC Shinnik Yaroslavl

The Shinnik Stadium is a multi-purpose stadium in Yaroslavl, Russia. It is currently used mostly for football matches and is the home ground of FC Shinnik Yaroslavl. The stadium holds 22,990 people. It was planned on being expanded to 45,000 people in capacity, for the FIFA World Cup 2018, but the plans fell through when Yaroslavl didn't make it to the host cities list.

== History ==
In June 2008, the reconstruction of the stadium was planned, which was to be completed in 2010 to the 1000th anniversary of Yaroslavl. The general plan provided for a canopy over all the stands of the stadium, all the stands should have been two-tier, except for the East, for the reason that it goes to the roadway. Track and field athletics tracks were to be preserved. As of autumn 2010, only the new South Stand was rebuilt [1]. May 22, 2011 at the stadium "Shinnik" was the final of the Russian Football Cup 2011.

In 2012, Yaroslavl was originally selected to host 2018 FIFA World Cup matches. The stadium was supposed to be completely reconstructed, but Yaroslavl was cut from the final host list.
