= Anuchino, Primorsky Krai =

Anuchino Ану́чино
- Rural locality
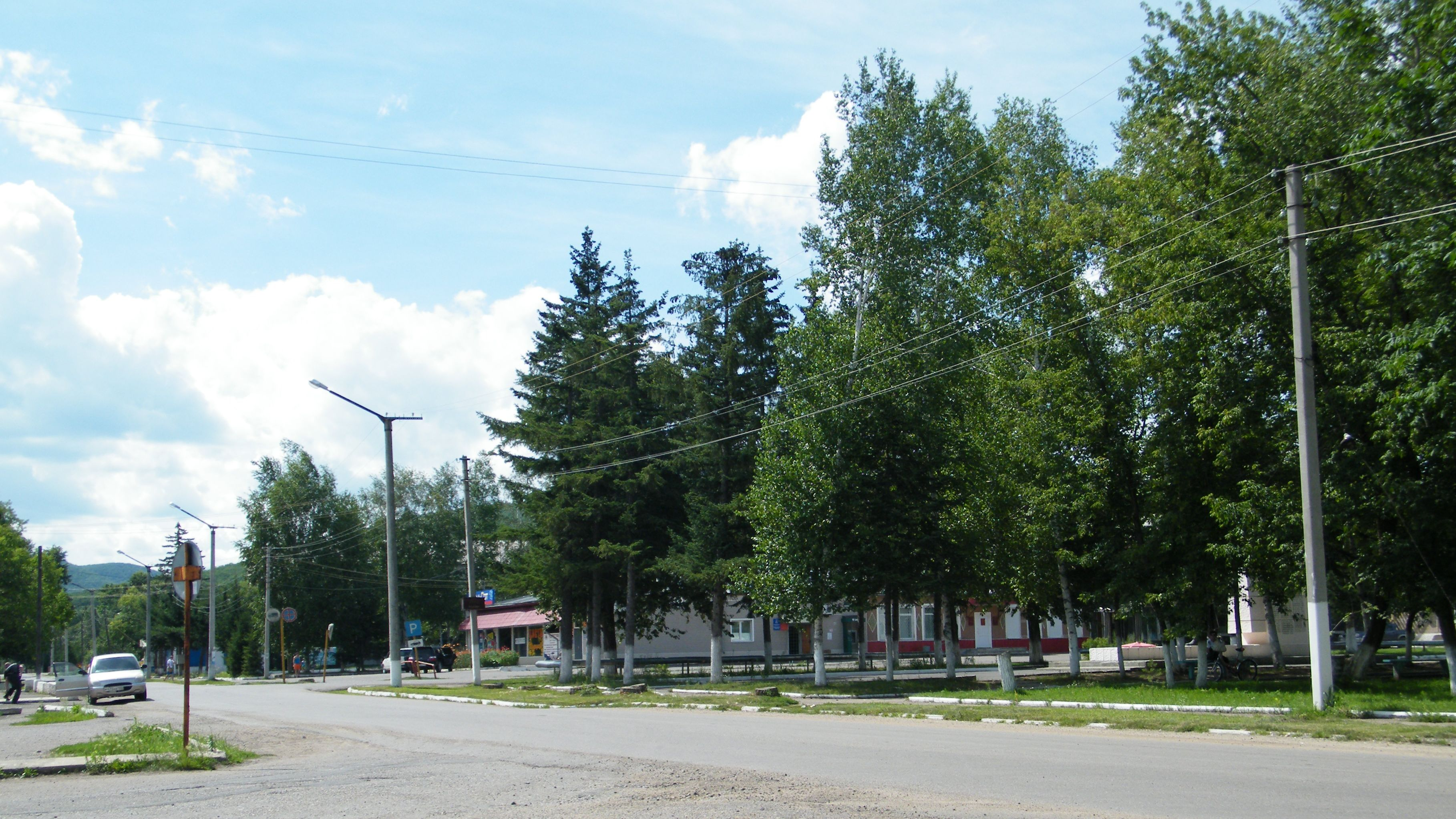
- Anuchino (Primorye region) street view

- Location within Russia
- Coordinates: 43°57′24″N 133°03′34″E
- Country: Russia
- Federal Subject: Primorsky Krai
- District: Anuchinsky
- Established: 1880

Population (2010)
  - Total: 4,462

Anuchino (Russian: Ану́чино) is a rural locality (a selo) and the administrative center of Anuchinsky District of Primorsky Krai, Russia, located on the right bank of the Arsenyevka River, near its confluence with the Muraveyka River. Population: 4,462 (2010 census); 4,772 (2002 census); 5,364 (1989 Soviet census).

== History ==
It was founded in 1880.
