= Yakovlevsky District, Primorsky Krai =

Yakovlevsky District Яковлевский район (Russian)
- District
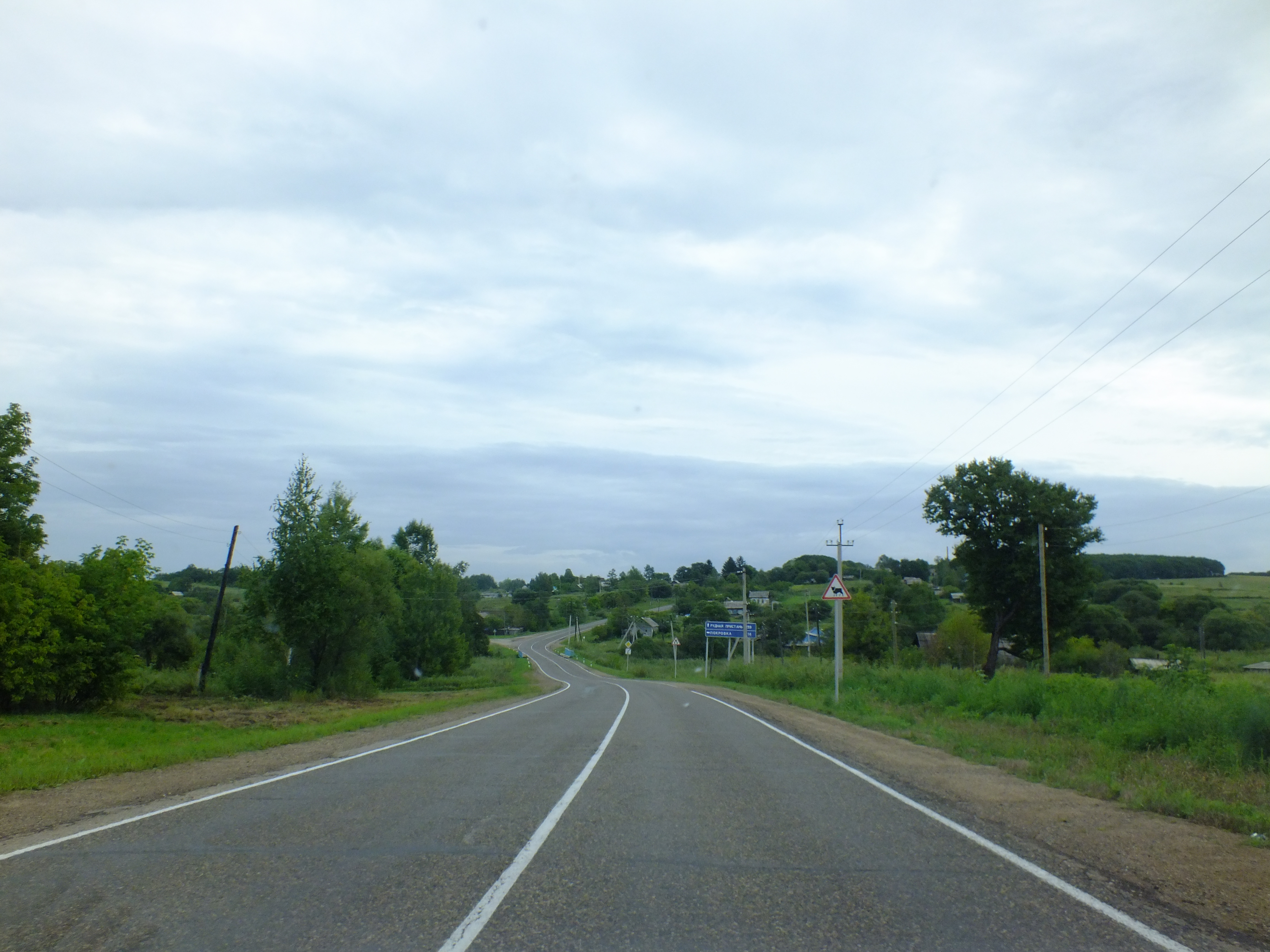
- Selo Dostoyevka, Yakovlevsky District

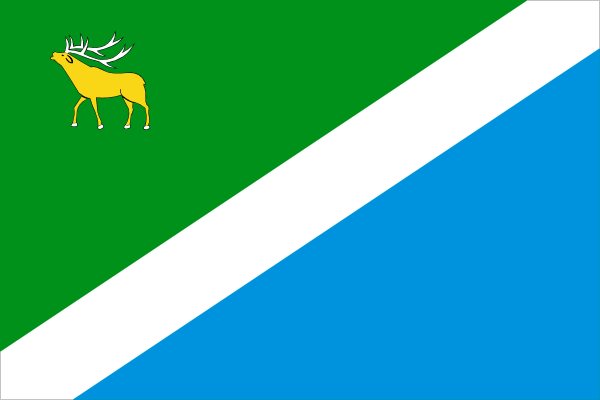
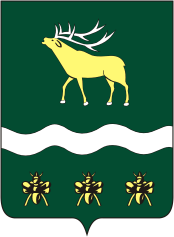
- Flag Coat of arms
- Location of Yakovlevsky District in Primorsky Krai
- Coordinates: 44°25′00″N 133°30′00″E
- Country: Russia
- Federal subject: Primorsky Krai
- Established: 1926
- Administrative center: Yakovlevka

Area
  - Total: 2,400.1 km^{2} (926.7 sq mi)

Population (2010 Census)
  - Total: 16,042
  - Density: 6.6839/km^{2} (17.311/sq mi)
  - Urban: 0%
  - Rural: 100%

Administrative structure
  - Inhabited localities: 19 rural localities

Municipal structure
  - Municipally incorporated as: Yakovlevsky Municipal District
  - Municipal divisions: 0 urban settlements, 5 rural settlements
- Time zone: UTC+10 (MSK+7)
- OKTMO ID: 05659000
- Website: http://mo.primorsky.ru/yakovlevsky/

Yakovlevsky District (Russian: Я́ковлевский райо́н) is an administrative and municipal district (raion), one of the twenty-two in Primorsky Krai, Russia. It is located in the center of the krai. The area of the district is 2,400.1 square kilometers (926.7 sq mi). Its administrative center is the rural locality (a selo) of Yakovlevka. Population: 16,042 (2010 census); 18,406 (2002 census); 21,483 (1989 Soviet census). The population of Yakovlevka accounts for 27.9% of the district's total population.
