= FC Sibir Novosibirsk (2019) =

Russian football club

- Full name: Football Club Sibir Novosibirsk
- Founded: 10 June 2019; 7 years ago
- Ground: Spartak Stadium, Novosibirsk
- Capacity: 12,500
- Owner: Novosibirsk Oblast
- Chairman: Aleksey Tolokonsky
- Manager: Vyacheslav Komkov
- League: Russian Second League, Division A, Gold Group
- 2025–26: First Stage: 5th
- Website: fcsib.ru
Home colours	Away colours

FC Sibir Novosibirsk (Russian: ФК «Сибирь» (Новосибирск)) is a Russian professional association football club based in Novosibirsk, playing at the Spartak Stadium. The club was established by the initiative of the Government of Novosibirsk Oblast in 2019.

== History ==
The club was founded in 2019 as FC Novosibirsk to replace FC Sibir Novosibirsk, after Sibir was relegated from the Russian National Football league to the third-tier Russian Professional Football League, at the end of 2018–19 season.

In the 2023–24 season, Novosibirsk qualified for the Second League promotion play-offs, but lost to FC Rotor Volgograd and remained in the Second League.

On 27 June 2024, FC Novosibirsk announced that the club is renamed to FC Sibir Novosibirsk.

== Stadium ==
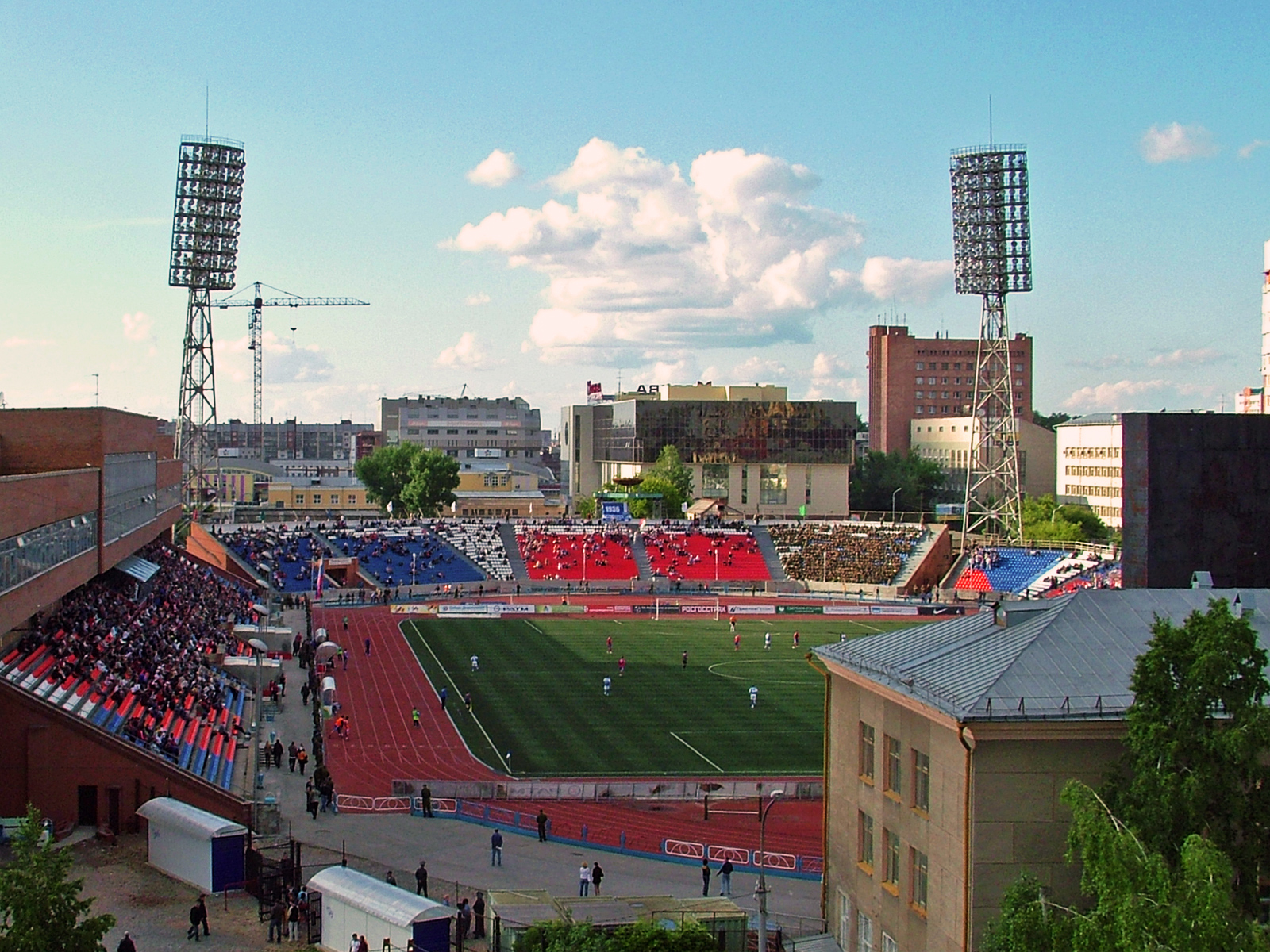

Novosibirsk's home ground is now the 12,500-capacity Spartak Stadium in Novosibirsk. It is a multi-purpose stadium which currently used mostly for football matches. It is the most easterly venue to have hosted a match in UEFA club competition.

== Current squad ==
As of 11 September 2026, according to the Second League website.

Note: Flags indicate national team as defined under FIFA eligibility rules; some limited exceptions apply. Players may hold more than one non-FIFA nationality.

No.	Pos.	Nation	Player
2	DF	RUS	Ivan Churikov
3	DF	RUS	Daniil Petrunin
4	DF	RUS	Dmitri Redkovich
5	DF	RUS	Ilya Maksimenkov
6	DF	RUS	Deniz Elchichek
7	MF	RUS	Arseny Popushoy (on loan from Baltika Kaliningrad)
8	MF	RUS	Bogdan Boldyrev
9	FW	RUS	Maksim Chikanchi
11	MF	RUS	Oleg Nikolayev
16	GK	RUS	Aleksey Karmin
17	MF	RUS	Danila Meksh
18	DF	RUS	Yegor Sinyakov
19	DF	RUS	Sergey Zapalatsky
20	MF	RUS	Vladimir Laptev
21	MF	RUS	Anton Makurin

No.	Pos.	Nation	Player
22	FW	RUS	Anton Kobyalko
23	MF	RUS	Anton Krotov
26	DF	RUS	Artyom Popkov
30	MF	RUS	Amir Alizade
31	DF	RUS	Georgi Zotov
34	GK	RUS	Matvey Bykov
35	GK	RUS	Maksim Kiselyov
39	FW	RUS	Kirill Stepanov (on loan from Baltika Kaliningrad)
42	DF	RUS	Arseny Afonin
53	MF	RUS	Aleksandr Deryugin
55	MF	RUS	Vadim Govor
81	MF	RUS	Artur Yangayev
91	MF	RUS	Vadim Vshivkov (on loan from SKA-Khabarovsk)
95	FW	RUS	Dmitry Velikodny
99	FW	RUS	Maksim Zhitnev
