= 2018–19 FC Rubin Kazan season =

Rubin Kazan
2018–19 season
- Chairman: Ilsur Metshin
- Manager: Kurban Berdyev
- Stadium: Kazan Arena
- Russian Premier League: 11th
- Russian Cup: Quarter-final (vs. Lokomotiv Moscow)
- Top goalscorer: League: Yegor Sorokin (6); All: Yegor Sorokin (6)
| Home colours | Away colours | Third colours |

The 2018–19 FC Rubin Kazan season was the sixteenth successive season that Rubin Kazan played in the Russian Premier League, the highest tier of association football in Russia.

== Squad ==
As of 22 February 2019

Note: Flags indicate national team as defined under FIFA eligibility rules; some limited exceptions apply. Players may hold more than one non-FIFA nationality.

| No. | Pos. | Nation | Player |
|---|---|---|---|
| 1 | GK | RUS | David Volk |
| 3 | DF | RUS | Ibragim Tsallagov (on loan from Zenit Saint Petersburg) |
| 5 | DF | CRO | Filip Uremović |
| 6 | MF | RUS | Yevgeni Bashkirov |
| 7 | MF | RUS | Vyacheslav Podberyozkin |
| 8 | MF | RUS | Vladislav Panteleyev |
| 9 | MF | RUS | Roman Akbashev |
| 10 | FW | RUS | Dmitry Poloz (on loan from Zenit Saint Petersburg) |
| 11 | FW | RUS | Aleksandr Bukharov |
| 15 | MF | RUS | Igor Konovalov |
| 18 | MF | RUS | Pavel Mogilevets |
| 19 | MF | RUS | Khoren Bayramyan (on loan from FC Rostov) |

| No. | Pos. | Nation | Player |
|---|---|---|---|
| 21 | GK | RUS | Yegor Baburin (on loan from Zenit Saint Petersburg) |
| 23 | GK | RUS | Ivan Konovalov |
| 41 | DF | RUS | Vladislav Mikushin |
| 50 | DF | RUS | Rail Abdullin |
| 65 | FW | RUS | Artur Sagitov |
| 69 | DF | RUS | Danil Stepanov |
| 77 | MF | IRI | Reza Shekari |
| 80 | DF | RUS | Yegor Sorokin |
| 88 | MF | RUS | Ruslan Kambolov |
| 91 | DF | RUS | Vitali Ustinov |
| 97 | MF | RUS | Adil Mukhametzyanov |

== Transfers ==
In: Note: Flags indicate national team as defined under FIFA eligibility rules; some limited exceptions apply. Players may hold more than one non-FIFA nationality.

| No. | Pos. | Nation | Player |
|---|---|---|---|
| 3 | DF | RUS | Ibragim Tsallagov (on loan from (Russia) Zenit Saint Petersburg) |
| 4 | DF | ESP | Chico (from (Spain) Granada) |
| 5 | DF | CRO | Filip Uremović (from (Slovenia) Olimpija Ljubljana) |
| 7 | MF | RUS | Vyacheslav Podberyozkin (from (Russia) Krasnodar, previously on loan) |
| 10 | FW | RUS | Dmitry Poloz (on loan from (Russia) Zenit Saint Petersburg) |
| 11 | FW | RUS | Aleksandr Bukharov (free agent) |
| 19 | MF | RUS | Khoren Bayramyan (on loan from (Russia) Rostov) |
| 21 | GK | RUS | Yegor Baburin (on loan from (Russia) Zenit Saint Petersburg) |
| 23 | GK | RUS | Ivan Konovalov (from (Belarus) Torpedo-BelAZ Zhodino) |
| 52 | MF | RUS | Denis Fedorochev (from (Russia) Amkar Perm) |
| 54 | DF | RUS | Stepan Ostanin (from (Russia) Amkar Perm) |
| 56 | MF | RUS | Maksim Sedov (from (Russia) Amkar Perm) |
| 57 | DF | RUS | Pavel Korkin (free agent) |
| 70 | MF | RUS | Georgy Bazayev |
| 97 | MF | RUS | Adil Mukhametzyanov |

Out: Note: Flags indicate national team as defined under FIFA eligibility rules; some limited exceptions apply. Players may hold more than one non-FIFA nationality.

| No. | Pos. | Nation | Player |
|---|---|---|---|
| 1 | GK | RUS | Sergey Ryzhikov (to (Russia) Krylia Sovetov Samara) |
| 2 | DF | RUS | Oleg Kuzmin (retired) |
| 26 | DF | ROU | Gabriel Enache (to (Serbia) Partizan) |
| 53 | FW | RUS | Nikita Goldobin (on loan to (Russia) Zvezda Perm) |
| 58 | MF | RUS | Timur Lobanov (to (Russia) Lokomotiv Moscow) |
| 61 | MF | TUR | Gökdeniz Karadeniz (retired) |
| 64 | DF | RUS | Kirill Lukyanchikov (to (Russia) Ural Yekaterinburg) |
| 66 | MF | ECU | Christian Noboa (end of loan from (Russia) Zenit Saint Petersburg) |
| 68 | MF | RUS | Ilya Snezhkin |
| 71 | MF | BUL | Ivelin Popov (end of loan from (Russia) Spartak Moscow) |
| 72 | FW | RUS | Nikita Tsygankov |
| 74 | MF | RUS | Maksim Lukoyanov (to (Russia) Ural-2 Yekaterinburg) |
| 75 | MF | RUS | Nikita Torgashov (to (Russia) Sokol Saratov) |
| 76 | DF | RUS | Semyon Ilyukhin |
| 85 | MF | RUS | Ilzat Akhmetov (to (Russia) CSKA Moscow) |
| 96 | FW | RUS | Rifat Zhemaletdinov (to (Russia) Lokomotiv Moscow) |
| — | MF | BEL | Maxime Lestienne (to (Belgium) Standard Liège, previously on loan to (Spain) Málaga) |
| — | DF | SWE | Emil Bergström (to (Netherlands) Utrecht, previously on loan to (Switzerland) Grasshoppers) |
| — | DF | RUS | Sergei Doronin (released, previously on loan to (Russia) Neftekhimik Nizhnekamsk) |
| — | DF | ESP | Sergio Sánchez (to (Spain) Espanyol, previously on loan) |
| — | MF | RUS | Georgi Makhatadze (to (Russia) Lokomotiv Moscow, previously on loan to (Russia) SKA-Khabarovsk) |
| — | MF | RUS | Ruslan Shcherbin (to (Russia) KAMAZ Naberezhnye Chelny, previously on loan) |
| — | FW | RUS | Dmitri Kamenshchikov (to (Russia) Neftekhimik Nizhnekamsk, previously on loan) |
| — | FW | ESP | Rubén Rochina (to (Spain) Levante, previously on loan) |

=== Winter ===
In: Note: Flags indicate national team as defined under FIFA eligibility rules; some limited exceptions apply. Players may hold more than one non-FIFA nationality.

| No. | Pos. | Nation | Player |
|---|---|---|---|
| 1 | GK | RUS | David Volk |
| 6 | MF | RUS | Yevgeni Bashkirov (from (Russia) Krylia Sovetov Samara) |
| 8 | MF | RUS | Vladislav Panteleyev (from (Russia) Spartak Moscow) |
| 9 | MF | RUS | Roman Akbashev (from (Russia) Avangard Kursk) |
| 72 | FW | RUS | Nikita Tsygankov |
| 79 | GK | RUS | Edgar Rakhmatullin |
| 81 | GK | RUS | Tagir Khismatullin |
| 82 | MF | RUS | Roman Baluyev |
| 83 | DF | RUS | Ruslan Gavrilov |
| 84 | MF | RUS | Stepan Surikov |
| 85 | MF | RUS | Artur Maksimchuk |
| 86 | DF | RUS | Vyacheslav Fomin |
| 90 | MF | RUS | Danil Kamantsev |
| 92 | MF | RUS | Anton Sholokh |
| 94 | FW | RUS | Artur Rashitov |
| 95 | MF | RUS | Anton Adarichev |
| 96 | DF | RUS | Danila Karyagin |
| 99 | GK | RUS | Nikita Yanovich |

Out: Note: Flags indicate national team as defined under FIFA eligibility rules; some limited exceptions apply. Players may hold more than one non-FIFA nationality.

| No. | Pos. | Nation | Player |
|---|---|---|---|
| 4 | DF | ESP | Chico |
| 16 | GK | RUS | Timur Akmurzin (on loan to (Russia) Ufa) |
| 20 | FW | IRI | Sardar Azmoun (to (Russia) Zenit St. Petersburg) |
| 25 | GK | RUS | Aleksei Gorodovoy (on loan to (Russia) Zenit St. Petersburg, previously from (Norway) Kongsvinger) |
| 30 | DF | RUS | Fyodor Kudryashov (to (Turkey) İstanbul Başakşehir) |
| 35 | GK | RUS | Soslan Dzhanayev (to (Poland) Miedź Legnica) |
| 43 | DF | RUS | Grigori Ziganshin (to (Russia) KAMAZ Naberezhnye Chelny) |
| 44 | DF | ESP | César Navas (retired) |
| 93 | MF | RUS | Ilya Gilyazutdinov (to (Czech Republic) Vlašim) |
| — | FW | RUS | Nikita Goldobin (released, previously on loan to (Russia) Zvezda Perm) |

== Competitions ==
=== Russian Premier League ===
==== Results by round ====
| Round | 1 | 2 | 3 | 4 | 5 | 6 | 7 | 8 | 9 | 10 | 11 | 12 | 13 | 14 | 15 | 16 | 17 | 18 | 19 | 20 | 21 | 22 | 23 | 24 | 25 | 26 | 27 | 28 | 29 | 30 |
|---|---|---|---|---|---|---|---|---|---|---|---|---|---|---|---|---|---|---|---|---|---|---|---|---|---|---|---|---|---|---|
| Ground | H | A | H | A | H | A | H | A | H | H | A | H | A | H | A | H | A | H | A | H | A | H | A | A | H | A | H | A | H | A |
| Result | W | D | L | D | D | D | W | D | W | W | D | D | L | D | D | D | W | W | L | L | D | D | L | L | D | D | W | L | D | L |
| Position | 2 | 4 | 8 | 8 | 9 | 11 | 6 | 7 | 6 | 5 | 7 | 7 | 8 | 6 | 9 | 9 | 6 | 6 | 6 | 7 | 8 | 8 | 9 | 10 | 11 | 11 | 10 | 10 | 10 | 11 |

Updated to match(es) played on 26 May 2019. Source: See Results
A = Away; H = Home; W = Win; D = Draw; L = Loss

==== Results ====
| 29 July 2018 1 | Rubin Kazan | 2 – 1 | Krasnodar | Kazan |
| 19:00 MSK (UTC+3) | Azmoun 9', 38'; Mogilevets (yellow card) 39' | Report | Smolov 31'; Spajić (yellow card) 43' | Stadium: Kazan Arena; Attendance: 13,884; Referee: Kirill Levnikov |

| 3 August 2018 2 | Dynamo Moscow | 1 – 1 | Rubin Kazan | Khimki |
| 19:30 MSK (UTC+3) | Černych 14'; Sow (yellow card) 35'; Panchenko (yellow card) 45+2'; Markov (yellow card) 64' | Report | Poloz 51' | Stadium: Arena Khimki; Attendance: 5,841; Referee: Pavel Kukuyan |

| 12 August 2018 3 | Rubin Kazan | 0 – 1 | Zenit St.Petersburg | Kazan |
| 19:00 MSK (UTC+3) | Kudryashov (yellow card) 43'; Konovalov (yellow card) 73' | Report | Mevlja (yellow card) 54'; Kuzyayev (yellow card) 64' (yellow-red card) 71'; Yerokhin 78' | Stadium: Kazan Arena; Attendance: 23,840; Referee: Mikhail Vilkov |

| 18 August 2018 4 | Akhmat Grozny | 1 – 1 | Rubin Kazan | Grozny |
| 21:30 MSK (UTC+3) | Mbengue 90+4' (yellow card) 90+5' | Report | Konovalov (yellow card) 5'; Tsallagov (yellow card) 74'; Bayramyan 83' | Stadium: Akhmat-Arena; Attendance: 10,732; Referee: Sergey Ivanov |

| 25 August 2018 5 | Rubin Kazan | 1 – 1 | CSKA Moscow | Kazan |
| 16:30 MSK (UTC+3) | Poloz 10'; Azmoun (yellow card) 72' | Report | Becão (yellow card) 41'; Chalov 67'; Yefremov (yellow card) 74'; Bistrović (yellow card) 86' | Stadium: Kazan Arena; Attendance: 26,531; Referee: Vitali Meshkov |

| 31 August 2018 6 | Rostov | 1 – 1 | Rubin Kazan | Rostov-on-Don |
| 19:30 MSK (UTC+3) | Gațcan (yellow card) 8'; Ionov 37' (pen.); Parshivlyuk (yellow card) 50'; Yusupov (yellow card) 60' | Report | Sorokin 50'; Kambolov (yellow card) 63'; Konovalov (yellow card) 65'; Azmoun (yellow card) 78'; Shekari (yellow card) 89' | Stadium: Rostov Arena; Attendance: 40,012; Referee: Aleksei Yeskov |

| 15 September 2018 7 | Rubin Kazan | 1 – 0 | Yenisey Krasnoyarsk | Kazan |
| 14:00 MSK (UTC+3) | Poloz 6'; Chico (yellow card) 64'; Granat (yellow card) 69' | Report | Dugalić (yellow card) 40'; Ogude (yellow card) 50' | Stadium: Kazan Arena; Attendance: 8,903; Referee: Vladislav Bezborodov |

| 22 September 2018 8 | Arsenal Tula | 2 – 2 | Rubin Kazan | Tula |
| 16:30 MSK (UTC+3) | Mohammed 13'; Berkhamov (yellow card) 24'; Bakayev 76'; Denisov (yellow card) 79'; Lesovoy (yellow card) 85' | Report | Podberyozkin (yellow card) 7'; Mogilevets (yellow card) 69'; Konovalov 77'; Bayramyan (penalty missed) 79'; Bukharov (yellow card) 83'; Uremović 90+2' (yellow card) 90+3'; Navas (yellow card) 90+5' | Stadium: Arsenal Stadium; Attendance: 11,805; Referee: Nikolay Voloshin |

| 1 October 2018 9 | Rubin Kazan | 2 – 1 | Krylia Sovetov | Kazan |
| 19:30 MSK (UTC+3) | Podberyozkin 27'; Kambolov (yellow card) 65'; Azmoun 90+4' | Report | Samardžić (yellow card) 38'; Kanunnikov 49' | Stadium: Kazan Arena; Attendance: 6,374; Referee: Kirill Levnikov |

| 6 October 2018 10 | Rubin Kazan | 1 – 0 | Ural Yekaterinburg | Kazan |
| 19:00 MSK (UTC+3) | Azmoun 21' (yellow card) 68'; Konovalov (yellow card) 83' | Report | | Stadium: Kazan Arena; Attendance: 5,750; Referee: Sergey Ivanov |

| 20 October 2018 11 | Ufa | 0 – 0 | Rubin Kazan | Ufa |
| 16:30 MSK (UTC+3) | Thill (yellow card) 68'; Salatić (yellow card) 76' | Report | Bayramyan (yellow card) 38'; Ustinov (yellow card) 71' | Stadium: Neftyanik Stadium; Attendance: 5,166; Referee: Roman Galimov |

| 29 October 2018 12 | Rubin Kazan | 1 – 1 | Spartak Moscow | Kazan |
| 20:30 MSK (UTC+3) | Podberyozkin (yellow card) 47'; Ustinov (yellow card) 63'; Sorokin 90+2' | Report | Kombarov (yellow card) 41' (goal) 78' (pen.); Hanni (yellow card) 44'; Tashayev (yellow card) 79'; Zobnin (yellow card) 87' | Stadium: Kazan Arena; Attendance: 16,101; Referee: Vasily Kazartsev |

| 5 November 2018 13 | Orenburg | 1 – 0 | Rubin Kazan | Orenburg |
| 14:00 MSK (UTC+3) | Begić (yellow card) 18'; Sutormin 57' (pen.); Afonin (yellow card) 72' | Report | Kambolov (yellow card) 18'; Kudryashov (yellow card) 56'; Konovalov (yellow card) 63'; Sorokin (red card) 87' | Stadium: Gazovik Stadium; Attendance: 4,014; Referee: Sergey Lapochkin |

| 11 November 2018 14 | Rubin Kazan | 0 – 0 | Lokomotiv Moscow | Kazan |
| 16:30 MSK (UTC+3) | Uremović (yellow card) 40'; Bukharov (yellow card) 65' | Report | Rybus (yellow card) 30'; Krychowiak (yellow card) 69' | Stadium: Kazan Arena; Attendance: 7,719; Referee: Vladislav Bezborodov |

| 24 November 2018 15 | Anzhi Makhachkala | 1 – 1 | Rubin Kazan | Kaspiysk |
| 16:00 MSK (UTC+3) | Chaykovskiy (yellow card) 23'; Dolgov 36'; Ponce (yellow card) 76' | Report | Kalinin 27'; Kambolov (yellow card) 49'; Tsallagov (yellow card) 70'; Navas (yellow card) 76' | Stadium: Anzhi Arena; Attendance: 3,620; Referee: Sergey Ivanov |

| 30 November 2018 16 | Rubin Kazan | 1 – 1 | Dynamo Moscow | Kazan |
| 19:30 MSK (UTC+3) | Azmoun (yellow card) 52'; Lutsenko 69' (o.g.); Granat (yellow card) 72' | Report | Kozlov (yellow card) 24'; Temnikov (yellow card) 30'; Grulyov 86' | Stadium: Kazan Arena; Attendance: 3,282; Referee: Evgeny Turbin |

| 9 December 2018 17 | Zenit St.Petersburg | 1 – 2 | Rubin Kazan | Saint Petersburg |
| 19:00 MSK (UTC+3) | Hernani (yellow card) 18'; Shatov (yellow card) 28'; Neto (yellow card) 48'; Paredes (yellow card) 55' (goal) 59' (pen.); Marchisio (yellow card) 85' | Report | Sorokin 7', 50'; Bayramyan (yellow card) 29'; Kalinin (yellow card) 39'; Sagitov (yellow card) 61'; Uremović (yellow card) 78'; Granat (yellow card) 90+4' | Stadium: Krestovsky Stadium; Attendance: 48,657; Referee: Aleksei Matyunin |

| 2 March 2019 18 | Rubin Kazan | 1 – 0 | Akhmat Grozny | Kazan |
| 19:00 MSK (UTC+3) | Kambolov (yellow card) 62'; Konovalov (yellow card) 68'; Sagitov 90+4' | Report | Utsiyev (yellow card) 43'; Szymański (yellow card) 76' | Stadium: Kazan Arena; Attendance: 3,425; Referee: Vladimir Moskalyov |

| 9 March 2019 19 | CSKA Moscow | 3 – 0 | Rubin Kazan | Moscow |
| 16:30 MSK (UTC+3) | Nishimura 24'; Chalov 83'; Diveyev (yellow card) 85'; Bijol 90+3' | Report | Kambolov (yellow card) 62'; Bashkirov (yellow card) 64'; Konovalov (yellow card) 74' | Stadium: VEB Arena; Attendance: 18,489; Referee: Kirill Levnikov |

| 16 March 2019 20 | Rubin Kazan | 0 – 2 | Rostov | Kazan |
| 16:30 MSK (UTC+3) | | Report | Eremenko (yellow card) 8' (goal) 83', 89'; Zaynutdinov (yellow card) 70' | Stadium: Kazan Arena; Attendance: 5,101; Referee: Sergey Lapochkin |

| 30 March 2019 21 | Yenisey Krasnoyarsk | 1 – 1 | Rubin Kazan | Krasnoyarsk |
| 11:30 MSK (UTC+3) | Ogude (yellow card) 42' (yellow-red card) 43'; Gadzhibekov 72'; Sobolev (yellow card) 90+5' | Report | Sorokin (yellow card) 20'; Podberyozkin (yellow card) 22'; Ustinov (yellow card) 45+1'; Uremović (yellow card) 47'; Bayramyan 59' (yellow card) 90+1'; Konovalov (yellow card) 68' | Stadium: Central Stadium; Attendance: 7,804; Referee: Vitali Meshkov |

| 7 April 2019 22 | Rubin Kazan | 0 – 0 | Arsenal Tula | Kazan |
| 16:30 MSK (UTC+3) | Mogilevets (yellow card) 44'; Kambolov (yellow card) 79'; Podberyozkin (yellow card) 90' | Report | Berkhamov (yellow card) 88' | Stadium: Kazan Arena; Attendance: 6,118; Referee: Mikhail Vilkov |

| 12 April 2019 23 | Krylia Sovetov | 1 – 0 | Rubin Kazan | Samara |
| 18:30 MSK (UTC+3) | Zinkovsky 56'; Shishkin (yellow card) 57'; Samardžić (yellow card) 64'; Kanunnikov (yellow card) 73' | Report | Stepanov (yellow card) 28'; Uremović (yellow card) 74' | Stadium: Samara Arena; Attendance: 13,761; Referee: Vasiliy Kazartsev |

| 21 April 2019 24 | Ural Yekaterinburg | 2 – 1 | Rubin Kazan | Yekaterinburg |
| 16:30 MSK (UTC+3) | Yegorychev 1'; Bicfalvi 85' | Report | Poloz 4'; Bayramyan (yellow card) 11'; Stepanov (yellow card) 19'; Bukharov (yellow card) 81' | Stadium: Central Stadium; Attendance: 12,321; Referee: Nikolay Voloshin |

| 24 April 2019 25 | Rubin Kazan | 1 – 1 | Ufa | Kazan |
| 19:30 MSK (UTC+3) | Mogilevets (yellow card) 5'; Sorokin (yellow card) 36' (goal) 71'; Akbashev (yellow card) 84' | Report | Carp (yellow card) 21'; Krugovoy 45+2' | Stadium: Kazan Arena; Attendance: 5,866; Referee: Sergey Lapochkin |

| 29 April 2019 26 | Spartak Moscow | 1 – 1 | Rubin Kazan | Moscow |
| 19:30 MSK (UTC+3) | Lomovitsky (yellow card) 14'; Fernando 23'; Zé Luís (yellow card) 41' | Report | Sorokin (yellow card) 45+1' (goal) 87' | Stadium: Otkritie Arena; Attendance: 20,015; Referee: Vasily Kazartsev |

| 3 May 2019 27 | Rubin Kazan | 2 – 0 | Orenburg | Kazan |
| 16:30 MSK (UTC+3) | Tsallagov (yellow card) 31'; Bashkirov 35'; Poloz 77' (pen.) | Report | Popović (yellow card) 27'; Malykh (yellow card) 45'; Sivakow (yellow card) 76' | Stadium: Kazan Arena; Attendance: 8,107; Referee: Vladimir Moskalyov |

| 10 May 2019 28 | Lokomotiv Moscow | 4 – 0 | Rubin Kazan | Moscow |
| 19:00 MSK (UTC+3) | An.Miranchuk 3' (pen.); Smolov 10'; Zhemaletdinov (yellow card) 66'; Krychowiak 73'; Rybus (yellow card) 82'; Kvaratskhelia 87' | Report | Podberyozkin (yellow card) 3' (yellow-red card) 55'; Sagitov (yellow card) 79'; Konovalov (penalty missed) 83' | Stadium: RZD Arena; Attendance: 13,263; Referee: Vladislav Bezborodov |

| 20 May 2019 29 | Rubin Kazan | 0 – 0 | Anzhi Makhachkala | Kazan |
| 19:00 MSK (UTC+3) | Uremović (yellow card) 90+4' | Report | Kaloshin (yellow card) 84' | Stadium: Kazan Arena; Attendance: 5,405; Referee: Sergei Karasev |

| 26 May 2019 30 | Krasnodar | 1 – 0 | Rubin Kazan | Krasnodar |
| 14:00 MSK (UTC+3) | Gazinsky (yellow card) 57'; Claesson 59'; Ari (yellow card) 67' | Report | Bayramyan (yellow card) 40'; Stepanov (yellow card) 45+2'; Uremović (yellow card) 85' | Stadium: Krasnodar Stadium; Attendance: 34,897; Referee: Vladimir Moskalyov |

==== League table ====
| Pos | Team | Pld | W | D | L | GF | GA | GD | Pts | Qualification or relegation |
|---|---|---|---|---|---|---|---|---|---|---|
| 9 | Rostov | 30 | 10 | 11 | 9 | 25 | 23 | +2 | 41 | |
| 10 | Ural Yekaterinburg | 30 | 10 | 8 | 12 | 33 | 45 | −12 | 38 | |
| 11 | Rubin Kazan | 30 | 7 | 15 | 8 | 24 | 30 | −6 | 36 | |
| 12 | Dynamo Moscow | 30 | 6 | 15 | 9 | 28 | 28 | 0 | 33 | |
| 13 | Krylia Sovetov Samara (O) | 30 | 8 | 4 | 18 | 25 | 46 | −21 | 28 | Qualification for the Relegation play-offs |

Updated to match(es) played on 26 May 2019. Source: Russian Premier League, Soccerway
Rules for classification: 1) Points; 2) Head-to-head points; 3) Head-to-head matches won; 4) Head-to-head goal difference; 5) Head-to-head goals scored; 6) Head-to-head away goals; 7) Matches won; 8) Goal difference; 9) Goals scored; 10) Away goals scored; 11) Play-off.
(O) Play-off winner

=== Russian Cup ===
| 26 September 2018 Round of 32 | Khimki | 0 – 1 (a.e.t.) | Rubin Kazan | Khimki |
| 19:00 MSK (UTC+3) | Belous (yellow card) 35'; Aliyev (yellow card) 43'; Ryazantsev (yellow card) 107' | Report | Bayramyan (yellow card) 39'; Kambolov (yellow card) 88' (yellow-red card) 114'; Ryazantsev 98' (o.g.); Granat (yellow card) 111' | Stadium: Arena Khimki; Attendance: 1,400; Referee: Ivan Sidenkov |

| 25 October 2018 Round of 16 | Rubin Kazan | 1 – 0 | Dynamo Moscow | Kazan |
| 19:00 MSK (UTC+3) | Navas (yellow card) 26'; Azmoun 48' | Report | Cardoso (yellow card) 33'; Moskvichyov (yellow card) 54'; Grulyov (yellow card) 85'; Temnikov (yellow card) 90'; Terekhov (yellow card) 90+2' | Stadium: Kazan Arena; Attendance: 4,112; Referee: Stanislav Vasilyev |

| 5 December 2018 Quarterfinal 1st leg | Lokomotiv Moscow | 1 – 0 | Rubin Kazan | Moscow |
| 19:30 MSK (UTC+3) | Ćorluka 54' | Report | Navas (yellow card) 45+3' | Stadium: RZD Arena; Attendance: 8,290; Referee: Nikolay Voloshin |

| 6 March 2019 Quarterfinal 2nd leg | Rubin Kazan | 0 – 1 (0 – 2 agg.) | Lokomotiv Moscow | Kazan |
| 19:00 MSK (UTC+3) | Uremović (yellow card) 75' (yellow-red card) 76' | Report | Höwedes (yellow card) 21' (goal) 78'; Farfán (yellow card) 75'; Krychowiak (yellow card) 85'; Eder (yellow card) 88' | Stadium: Rubin Arena; Attendance: 10,349; Referee: Sergey Ivanov |

== Squad statistics ==
As of match played 26 May 2019

=== Appearances and goals ===
| No. | Pos | Nat | Player | Total | | Premier League | | Russian Cup | |
| No. | Pos | Nat | Player | Apps | Goals | Apps | Goals | Apps | Goals |
|---|---|---|---|---|---|---|---|---|---|
| 3 | DF | (Russia) RUS | Ibragim Tsallagov | 15 | 0 | 15 | 0 | 0 | 0 |
| 5 | DF | (Croatia) CRO | Filip Uremović | 27 | 1 | 22+1 | 1 | 3+1 | 0 |
| 6 | MF | (Russia) RUS | Yevgeni Bashkirov | 14 | 1 | 10+3 | 1 | 1 | 0 |
| 7 | MF | (Russia) RUS | Vyacheslav Podberyozkin | 24 | 1 | 17+4 | 1 | 3 | 0 |
| 8 | MF | (Russia) RUS | Vladislav Panteleyev | 5 | 0 | 0+4 | 0 | 1 | 0 |
| 9 | MF | (Russia) RUS | Roman Akbashev | 6 | 0 | 2+3 | 0 | 1 | 0 |
| 10 | FW | (Russia) RUS | Dmitry Poloz | 30 | 5 | 23+4 | 5 | 1+2 | 0 |
| 11 | FW | (Russia) RUS | Aleksandr Bukharov | 22 | 0 | 6+15 | 0 | 0+1 | 0 |
| 12 | DF | (Ukraine) UKR | Ihor Kalinin | 8 | 1 | 5+1 | 1 | 1+1 | 0 |
| 14 | DF | (Russia) RUS | Vladimir Granat | 18 | 0 | 13+1 | 0 | 4 | 0 |
| 15 | MF | (Russia) RUS | Igor Konovalov | 29 | 1 | 27 | 1 | 2 | 0 |
| 18 | MF | (Russia) RUS | Pavel Mogilevets | 31 | 0 | 18+9 | 0 | 3+1 | 0 |
| 19 | MF | (Russia) RUS | Khoren Bayramyan | 28 | 2 | 20+4 | 2 | 3+1 | 0 |
| 21 | GK | (Russia) RUS | Yegor Baburin | 9 | 0 | 6 | 0 | 3 | 0 |
| 23 | GK | (Russia) RUS | Ivan Konovalov | 21 | 0 | 20 | 0 | 1 | 0 |
| 41 | DF | (Russia) RUS | Vladislav Mikushin | 1 | 0 | 0 | 0 | 0+1 | 0 |
| 50 | DF | (Russia) RUS | Rail Abdullin | 2 | 0 | 1 | 0 | 1 | 0 |
| 65 | FW | (Russia) RUS | Artur Sagitov | 14 | 1 | 4+9 | 1 | 1 | 0 |
| 69 | DF | (Russia) RUS | Danil Stepanov | 11 | 0 | 7+3 | 0 | 1 | 0 |
| 77 | MF | (Iran) IRI | Reza Shekari | 4 | 0 | 0+3 | 0 | 1 | 0 |
| 80 | DF | (Russia) RUS | Yegor Sorokin | 30 | 6 | 21+6 | 6 | 3 | 0 |
| 88 | MF | (Russia) RUS | Ruslan Kambolov | 29 | 0 | 25+2 | 0 | 1+1 | 0 |
| 91 | DF | (Russia) RUS | Vitali Ustinov | 23 | 0 | 17+3 | 0 | 3 | 0 |
Players away from the club on loan:
Players who left Rubin Kazan during the season:
| 4 | DF | (Spain) ESP | Chico | 8 | 0 | 8 | 0 | 0 | 0 |
| 20 | FW | (Iran) IRI | Sardar Azmoun | 17 | 5 | 14 | 4 | 3 | 1 |
| 30 | DF | (Russia) RUS | Fyodor Kudryashov | 10 | 0 | 8+1 | 0 | 1 | 0 |
| 35 | GK | (Russia) RUS | Soslan Dzhanayev | 4 | 0 | 4 | 0 | 0 | 0 |
| 44 | DF | (Spain) ESP | César Navas | 19 | 0 | 17 | 0 | 2 | 0 |

=== Goal scorers ===
| Place | Position | Nation | Number | Name | Premier League | Russian Cup | Total |
|---|---|---|---|---|---|---|---|
| 1 | DF | (Russia) | 80 | Yegor Sorokin | 6 | 0 | 6 |
| 2 | FW | (Russia) | 10 | Dmitry Poloz | 5 | 0 | 5 |
| 2 | FW | (Iran) | 20 | Sardar Azmoun | 4 | 1 | 5 |
| 4 | MF | (Russia) | 19 | Khoren Bayramyan | 2 | 0 | 2 |
| 4 | | | | Own goal | 1 | 1 | 2 |
| 6 | MF | (Russia) | 15 | Igor Konovalov | 1 | 0 | 1 |
| 6 | DF | (Croatia) | 5 | Filip Uremović | 1 | 0 | 1 |
| 6 | MF | (Russia) | 7 | Vyacheslav Podberyozkin | 1 | 0 | 1 |
| 6 | DF | (Ukraine) | 12 | Ihor Kalinin | 1 | 0 | 1 |
| 6 | FW | (Russia) | 65 | Artur Sagitov | 1 | 0 | 1 |
| 6 | MF | (Russia) | 6 | Yevgeni Bashkirov | 1 | 0 | 1 |
| | | | | TOTALS | 24 | 2 | 26 |

=== Disciplinary record ===
| Number | Nation | Position | Name | Premier League | | Russian Cup | | Total | |
| Number | Nation | Position | Name | Yellow card | Red card | Yellow card | Red card | Yellow card | Red card |
| 3 | (Russia) | DF | Ibragim Tsallagov | 3 | 0 | 0 | 0 | 3 | 0 |
| 5 | (Croatia) | DF | Filip Uremović | 7 | 0 | 2 | 1 | 9 | 1 |
| 6 | (Russia) | MF | Yevgeni Bashkirov | 1 | 0 | 0 | 0 | 1 | 0 |
| 7 | (Russia) | MF | Vyacheslav Podberyozkin | 6 | 1 | 0 | 0 | 6 | 1 |
| 9 | (Russia) | MF | Roman Akbashev | 1 | 0 | 0 | 0 | 1 | 0 |
| 11 | (Russia) | FW | Aleksandr Bukharov | 3 | 0 | 0 | 0 | 3 | 0 |
| 12 | (Ukraine) | DF | Ihor Kalinin | 1 | 0 | 0 | 0 | 1 | 0 |
| 14 | (Russia) | DF | Vladimir Granat | 3 | 0 | 1 | 0 | 4 | 0 |
| 15 | (Russia) | MF | Igor Konovalov | 7 | 0 | 0 | 0 | 7 | 0 |
| 18 | (Russia) | MF | Pavel Mogilevets | 4 | 0 | 0 | 0 | 4 | 0 |
| 19 | (Russia) | MF | Khoren Bayramyan | 5 | 0 | 1 | 0 | 6 | 0 |
| 23 | (Russia) | GK | Ivan Konovalov | 1 | 0 | 0 | 0 | 1 | 0 |
| 65 | (Russia) | FW | Artur Sagitov | 2 | 0 | 0 | 0 | 2 | 0 |
| 69 | (Russia) | DF | Danil Stepanov | 3 | 0 | 0 | 0 | 3 | 0 |
| 77 | (Iran) | MF | Reza Shekari | 1 | 0 | 0 | 0 | 1 | 0 |
| 80 | (Russia) | DF | Yegor Sorokin | 3 | 1 | 0 | 0 | 3 | 1 |
| 88 | (Russia) | MF | Ruslan Kambolov | 7 | 0 | 2 | 1 | 9 | 1 |
| 91 | (Russia) | DF | Vitali Ustinov | 3 | 0 | 0 | 0 | 3 | 0 |
Players who left Rubin Kazan during the season:
| 4 | (Spain) | DF | Chico | 1 | 0 | 0 | 0 | 1 | 0 |
| 20 | (Iran) | FW | Sardar Azmoun | 4 | 0 | 0 | 0 | 4 | 0 |
| 30 | (Russia) | DF | Fyodor Kudryashov | 2 | 0 | 0 | 0 | 2 | 0 |
| 44 | (Spain) | DF | César Navas | 2 | 0 | 2 | 0 | 4 | 0 |
| | | | TOTALS | 70 | 2 | 8 | 2 | 78 | 4 |
