= 2019–20 FC Rubin Kazan season =

Rubin Kazan
2019–20 season
- Chairman: Ilsur Metshin
- Manager: Kurban Berdyev (until 5 June); Roman Sharonov (Caretaker) (6 June-16 December); Leonid Slutsky (from 19 December)
- Stadium: Central Stadium; Rounds 3, 4, 8, 11, 12, 14, 16, 17, 21; Ak Bars Arena; Rounds 6, 24, 26, 27, 29 30
- Russian Premier League: 10th
- Russian Cup: Round of 32 (vs. Khimki)
- Top goalscorer: League: Yevgeni Markov (5); All: Yevgeni Markov (5)
Home colours	Away colours

The 2019–20 FC Rubin Kazan season was the seventeenth successive season that Rubin Kazan played in the Russian Premier League, the highest tier of association football in Russia.

== Season events ==
On 5 June, Kurban Berdyev left his position as manager of Rubin, with Roman Sharonov being appointed as the caretaker manager of Rubin on 6 June, but due to not possess the necessary UEFA Pro Licence at the time, but rather UEFA A Licence, he was formally registered with the league as an assistant coach, with Spanish coach Eduardo Aldama Docampo registered as the de jure head coach. On 16 December, with Rubin in 13th place in the table, Sharonov left the club by mutual consent. On 19 December, Leonid Slutsky was appointed as Rubin's new manager.

On 17 March, the Russian Premier League postponed all league fixtures until April 10th due to the COVID-19 pandemic.

On 1 April, the Russian Football Union extended the suspension of football until 31 May.

On 15 May, the Russian Football Union announced that the Russian Premier League season would resume on 21 June.

On 21 July, Rubin signed Đorđe Despotović to a 3-year contract.

== Squad ==
As of match played 22 July 2020

No.	Name	Nationality	Position	Date of birth (age)	Signed from	Signed in	Contract ends	Apps.	Goals
Goalkeepers
1	David Volk	(Russia)	GK	11 April 2001 (aged 19)	Neftekhimik Nizhnekamsk II	2019		0	0
22	Yury Dyupin	(Russia)	GK	17 March 1988 (aged 32)	Anzhi Makhachkala	2019	2020	30	0
23	Ivan Konovalov	(Russia)	GK	18 August 1994 (aged 25)	Torpedo-BelAZ Zhodino	2018	2022	22	0
93	Aleksei Gorodovoy	(Russia)	GK	10 August 1993 (aged 26)	Kongsvinger	2019		0	0
Defenders
2	Carl Starfelt	(Sweden)	DF	1 June 1995 (aged 25)	IFK Göteborg	2019	2023	11	0
3	Konstantin Pliyev	(Russia)	DF	26 October 1996 (aged 23)	loan from Rostov	2019	2020	13	0
4	Silvije Begić	(Croatia)	DF	3 June 1993 (aged 27)	Orenburg	2019	2023	0	0
5	Filip Uremović	(Croatia)	DF	11 February 1997 (aged 23)	Olimpija Ljubljana	2018		52	1
14	Vladimir Granat	(Russia)	DF	22 May 1987 (aged 33)	Rostov	2017		46	0
27	Pablo	(Brazil)	DF	18 March 1992 (aged 28)	loan from Braga	2020	2020	9	0
33	Oleh Danchenko	(Ukraine)	DF	1 August 1994 (aged 25)	Shakhtar Donetsk	2019	2023	20	0
51	Ilya Agapov	(Russia)	DF	21 January 2001 (aged 19)	Academy	2019		0	0
69	Danil Stepanov	(Russia)	DF	25 January 2000 (aged 20)	Academy	2018		20	0
71	Nikolai Poyarkov	(Russia)	DF	16 October 1999 (aged 20)	loan from Rostov	2019		7	0
77	Ilya Samoshnikov	(Russia)	DF	14 November 1997 (aged 22)	Torpedo Moscow	2020		6	0
Midfielders
7	Vyacheslav Podberyozkin	(Russia)	MF	21 June 1992 (aged 28)	Krasnodar	2018		53	2
8	Darko Jevtić	(Switzerland)	MF	8 February 1993 (aged 27)	Lech Poznań	2020	2023	10	0
10	Igor Konovalov	(Russia)	MF	8 July 1996 (aged 24)	Kuban Krasnodar	2018		65	3
11	Zuriko Davitashvili	(Georgia (country))	MF	15 February 2001 (aged 19)	Locomotive Tbilisi	2019		26	2
12	Aleksandr Zuyev	(Russia)	MF	26 June 1996 (aged 24)	loan from Rostov	2019		18	0
15	Dmitri Tarasov	(Russia)	MF	18 March 1987 (aged 33)		2020	2020	4	0
18	Pavel Mogilevets	(Russia)	MF	25 January 1993 (aged 27)	Rostov	2018		75	2
21	Khvicha Kvaratskhelia	(Georgia (country))	MF	12 February 2001 (aged 19)	Rustavi	2019	2024	28	3
25	Denis Makarov	(Russia)	MF	18 February 1998 (aged 22)	Neftekhimik Nizhnekamsk	2020	2023	9	2
28	Oliver Abildgaard	(Denmark)	MF	10 June 1996 (aged 24)	loan from AaB	2020	2024	11	0
59	Nikita Makarov	(Russia)	MF	2 January 2001 (aged 19)	Academy	2019		3	0
87	Soltmurad Bakayev	(Russia)	MF	5 August 1999 (aged 20)	Spartak Moscow	2020	2024	10	1
88	Aleksandr Tashayev	(Russia)	MF	23 June 1994 (aged 26)	loan from Spartak Moscow	2019		8	0
99	Kamil Zakirov	(Russia)	MF	15 November 1998 (aged 21)	Anzhi Makhachkala	2019	2023	3	0
Forwards
9	Đorđe Despotović	(Serbia)	FW	4 March 1992 (aged 28)	Orenburg	2020	2023	0	0
19	Ivan Ignatyev	(Russia)	FW	6 January 1999 (aged 21)	Krasnodar	2020	2024	11	1
20	Yevgeni Markov	(Russia)	FW	7 July 1994 (aged 26)	loan from Dynamo Moscow	2019	2020	22	5
40	Shahrom Samiyev	(Tajikistan)	FW	8 February 2001 (aged 19)	Istiklol	2020		0	0
Away on loan
9	Artur Sagitov	(Russia)	FW	7 January 2000 (aged 20)	Academy	2018		14	1
26	Beka Mikeltadze	(Georgia (country))	FW	26 November 1997 (aged 22)	Anorthosis Famagusta	2019		11	1
41	Vladislav Mikushin	(Russia)	DF	18 April 2001 (aged 19)	Academy	2017		1	0
50	Rail Abdullin	(Russia)	DF	6 August 2000 (aged 19)	Academy	2018		2	0
70	Nikolai Kipiani	(Russia)	MF	25 January 1997 (aged 23)	Rustavi	2019		3	0
Players that left Rubin Kazan during the season
6	Yevgeni Bashkirov	(Russia)	MF	6 July 1991 (aged 29)	Krylia Sovetov	2019		26	2
8	Viðar Örn Kjartansson	(Iceland)	FW	11 March 1990 (aged 30)	loan from Rostov	2019	2020	17	1
29	Vitaliy Denisov	(Uzbekistan)	DF	23 February 1987 (aged 33)	Lokomotiv Moscow	2019	2020	9	0
77	Roman Akbashev	(Russia)	MF	1 November 1991 (aged 28)	Avangard Kursk	2019		7	0
80	Yegor Sorokin	(Russia)	DF	4 November 1995 (aged 24)	loan from Krasnodar	2019	2020	66	0

=== On loan ===
Note: Flags indicate national team as defined under FIFA eligibility rules; some limited exceptions apply. Players may hold more than one non-FIFA nationality.

No.	Pos.	Nation	Player
—	DF	RUS	Rail Abdullin (at Neftekhimik Nizhnekamsk)
—	DF	RUS	Nikolai Kipiani (at Rotor Volgograd)
—	DF	RUS	Vladislav Mikushin (at Fakel Voronezh)
—	MF	RUS	Igor Nikolov (at Novosibirsk)

No.	Pos.	Nation	Player
—	MF	RUS	Mikhail Yakovlev (at KAMAZ Naberezhnye Chelny)
—	FW	GEO	Beka Mikeltadze (at Rotor Volgograd)
—	FW	RUS	Artur Sagitov (at Nizhny Novgorod)

=== Left club during season ===
Note: Flags indicate national team as defined under FIFA eligibility rules; some limited exceptions apply. Players may hold more than one non-FIFA nationality.

No.	Pos.	Nation	Player
8	FW	ISL	Viðar Örn Kjartansson (loan return to Rostov)
29	DF	UZB	Vitaliy Denisov (to Rotor Volgograd)

No.	Pos.	Nation	Player
77	MF	RUS	Roman Akbashev (to Neftekhimik Nizhnekamsk)
80	DF	RUS	Yegor Sorokin (loan return to Krasnodar)

== Transfers ==
=== In ===
Date	Position	Nationality	Name	From	Fee	Ref.
Summer 2019	MF	(Georgia (country))	Zuriko Davitashvili	Locomotive Tbilisi	Undisclosed	
13 June 2019	GK	(Russia)	Yury Dyupin	Anzhi Makhachkala	Undisclosed	
13 June 2019	MF	(Russia)	Kamil Zakirov	Anzhi Makhachkala	Undisclosed	
15 June 2019	DF	(Ukraine)	Oleh Danchenko	Shakhtar Donetsk	Undisclosed	
20 June 2019	DF	(Uzbekistan)	Vitaliy Denisov	Lokomotiv Moscow	Undisclosed	
29 June 2019	DF	(Croatia)	Silvije Begić	Orenburg	Undisclosed	
29 June 2019	MF	(Russia)	Aleksei Sutormin	Orenburg	Undisclosed	
6 July 2019	MF	(Georgia (country))	Khvicha Kvaratskhelia	Rustavi	Undisclosed	
8 July 2019	FW	(Georgia (country))	Beka Mikeltadze	Anorthosis Famagusta	Undisclosed	
13 July 2019	DF	(Sweden)	Carl Starfelt	IFK Göteborg	Undisclosed	
25 July 2019	MF	(Russia)	Nikolai Kipiani	Rustavi	Undisclosed	
2 January 2020	DF	(Russia)	Ilya Samoshnikov	Torpedo Moscow	Undisclosed	
2 January 2020	FW	(Russia)	Ivan Ignatyev	Krasnodar	Undisclosed	
6 January 2020	MF	(Russia)	Denis Makarov	Neftekhimik Nizhnekamsk	Undisclosed	
22 January 2020	MF	(Switzerland)	Darko Jevtić	Lech Poznań	Undisclosed	
22 January 2020	MF	(Russia)	Soltmurad Bakayev	Spartak Moscow	Undisclosed	
14 February 2020	FW	(Tajikistan)	Shahrom Samiyev	Istiklol	Free	
18 February 2020	MF	(Russia)	Dmitri Tarasov		Free	
9 June 2020	DF	(Russia)	Mikhail Merkulov	Ural Yekaterinburg	Undisclosed	
20 June 2020	MF	(Denmark)	Oliver Abildgaard	AaB	Undisclosed	
21 July 2020	FW	(Serbia)	Đorđe Despotović	Orenburg	Free	
24 June 2020	FW	(Russia)	Kirill Kosarev	Murom	Undisclosed	

=== Loans in ===
Date from	Position	Nationality	Name	From	Date to	Ref.
5 July 2019	FW	(Russia)	Yevgeni Markov	Dynamo Moscow	End of Season	
9 July 2019	DF	(Russia)	Konstantin Pliyev	Rostov	End of Season	
20 July 2019	FW	(Iceland)	Viðar Örn Kjartansson	Rubin Kazan	11 January 2020	
2 September 2019	DF	(Russia)	Nikolai Poyarkov	Rostov	End of Season	
2 September 2019	MF	(Russia)	Aleksandr Zuyev	Rostov	End of Season	
2 September 2019	MF	(Russia)	Aleksandr Tashayev	Spartak Moscow	End of Season	
2 September 2019	DF	(Russia)	Yegor Sorokin	Krasnodar	30 December 2019	
30 January 2020	DF	(Brazil)	Pablo	Braga	End of Season	
3 February 2020	MF	(Denmark)	Oliver Abildgaard	AaB	20 June 2020	

=== Out ===
Date	Position	Nationality	Name	To	Fee	Ref.
Summer 2019	GK	(Russia)	Timur Akmurzin	Spartak Moscow	Undisclosed	
Summer 2019	DF	(Russia)	Pavel Korkin	Sochi	Undisclosed	
10 June 2019	DF	(Russia)	Ruslan Kambolov	Krasnodar	Undisclosed	
14 June 2019	DF	(Russia)	Ihor Kalinin	Dynamo Moscow	Undisclosed	
9 July 2019	MF	(Iran)	Reza Shekari	Tractor	Undisclosed	
8 July 2019	MF	(Russia)	Aleksei Sutormin	Zenit St.Petersburg	Undisclosed	
2 September 2019	DF	(Russia)	Yegor Sorokin	Krasnodar	Undisclosed	
27 January 2020	MF	(Russia)	Roman Akbashev	Neftekhimik Nizhnekamsk	Undisclosed	
26 February 2020	MF	(Russia)	Yevgeni Bashkirov	Zagłębie Lubin	Undisclosed	
22 June 2020	MF	(Georgia (country))	Beka Mikeltadze	Rotor Volgograd	Undisclosed	
22 June 2020	FW	(Russia)	Nikolai Kipiani	Rotor Volgograd	Undisclosed	
14 July 2020	MF	(Russia)	Maksim Sedov	Fakel Voronezh	Undisclosed	

=== Loans out ===
Date from	Position	Nationality	Name	To	Date to	Ref.
19 July 2019	DF	(Russia)	Rail Abdullin	Neftekhimik Nizhnekamsk	End of Season	
19 July 2019	MF	(Russia)	Vladislav Mikushin	Fakel Voronezh	End of Season	
12 August 2019	FW	(Russia)	Artur Sagitov	Nizhny Novgorod	End of Season	
11 February 2020	DF	(Russia)	Nikolai Kipiani	Rotor Volgograd	End of Season	
11 February 2020	FW	(Georgia (country))	Beka Mikeltadze	Rotor Volgograd	End of Season	

=== Released ===
Date	Position	Nationality	Name	Joined	Date
30 May 2019	MF	(Russia)	Adil Mukhametzyanov	Tekstilshchik Ivanovo	26 June 2019
3 June 2019	DF	(Russia)	Vitali Ustinov	Atyrau	23 August 2019
17 June 2019	FW	(Russia)	Aleksandr Bukharov		
26 June 2019	MF	(Russia)	Vladislav Panteleyev	Arsenal Tula	27 June 2019
11 January 2020	DF	(Uzbekistan)	Vitaliy Denisov	Rotor Volgograd	16 January 2020
23 July 2020	DF	(Russia)	Vladimir Granat		
25 July 2020	GK	(Russia)	Tagir Khismatullin		
25 July 2020	GK	(Russia)	Arseni Vertkov		
25 July 2020	GK	(Russia)	Nikita Yanovich		
25 July 2020	DF	(Russia)	Vyacheslav Fomin		
25 July 2020	DF	(Russia)	Emil Gallyamov		
25 July 2020	DF	(Russia)	Ruslan Gavrilov		
25 July 2020	DF	(Russia)	Aleksandr Ivankov	Ural-2 Yekaterinburg	
25 July 2020	DF	(Russia)	Danila Karyagin		
25 July 2020	DF	(Russia)	Artur Koloskov		
25 July 2020	DF	(Russia)	Stepan Ostanin		
25 July 2020	DF	(Russia)	Saveli Ratnikov		
25 July 2020	MF	(Russia)	Viktor Aleksandrov		
25 July 2020	MF	(Russia)	Roman Baluyev		
25 July 2020	MF	(Russia)	Sergei Chernenko	Zvezda St. Petersburg	
25 July 2020	MF	(Russia)	Denis Fedorochev		
25 July 2020	MF	(Russia)	Aleks Radzhabov		
25 July 2020	MF	(Russia)	Denis Sabusov		
25 July 2020	MF	(Russia)	Danil Sharafutdinov		
25 July 2020	MF	(Russia)	Anton Sholokh		
25 July 2020	MF	(Russia)	Aleksandr Shubin		
25 July 2020	MF	(Russia)	Stepan Surikov		
25 July 2020	MF	(Russia)	Aleksandr Tsiberkin	Dynamo Bryansk	
25 July 2020	MF	(Russia)	Konstantin Vakhtyorov		
25 July 2020	FW	(Russia)	Oleg Crețul	Petrocub Hîncești	
25 July 2020	FW	(Russia)	Dzhosi Dzaurov		
25 July 2020	FW	(Russia)	Roman Pirmamedov		
25 July 2020	FW	(Russia)	Mishel Pukhayev		
25 July 2020	FW	(Russia)	Nikita Tsygankov		
25 July 2020	FW	(Russia)	Danila Yezhkov		

== Friendlies ==
21 January 2020	Rubin Kazan (Russia)	1 – 0	(Poland) Lechia Gdańsk	Belek, Turkey
15:00 MSK (UTC+3)	Podberyozkin 34'	Report

25 January 2020	Rubin Kazan (Russia)	2 – 1	(Slovakia) Slovan Bratislava	Belek, Turkey
12:00 MSK (UTC+3)	Moha 42'; Zuyev 84'	Report	Mustafić 66'

3 February 2020	Rubin Kazan (Russia)	0 – 1	(Denmark) OB	Belek, Turkey
15:00 MSK (UTC+3)	Mogilevets (yellow card) 18'	Report	Jebali 28'

6 February 2020	Rubin Kazan (Russia)	3 – 0	(Serbia) Vojvodina	Belek, Turkey
15:00 MSK (UTC+3)	Danchenko 45'; Jevtić 58'; Starfelt 88'	Report

9 February 2020	Rubin Kazan (Russia)	4 – 1	(Latvia) Spartaks Jūrmala	Belek, Turkey
15:00 MSK (UTC+3)		Report

16 February 2020	Rubin Kazan (Russia)	5 – 0	(Belarus) Slavia Mozyr	Belek, Turkey
15:00 MSK (UTC+3)	Kvaratskhelia 12'; D.Makarov 35'; Ignatyev 44' (pen.), 49'; Davitashvili 86'	Report	(red card) 73'

19 February 2020	Rubin Kazan (Russia)	2 – 3	(Kazakhstan) Kairat	Belek, Turkey
15:00 MSK (UTC+3)	Davitashvili 77' (pen.); Abildgaard 90'	Report	Aimbetov 14'; Dugalić 16'; Wrzesiński 36'

22 February 2020	Rubin Kazan (Russia)	2 – 0	(Moldova) Sheriff Tiraspol	Belek, Turkey
17:00 MSK (UTC+3)	Kvaratskhelia 11'; Bakayev 47'	Report	(red card) 60'

== Competitions ==
=== Premier League ===
==== League table ====
Pos	Team	Pld	W	D	L	GF	GA	GD	Pts
8	Arsenal Tula	30	11	5	14	37	41	−4	38 (Note: Head-to-head points: Arsenal Tula 4, Ufa 1)
9	Ufa	30	8	14	8	22	24	−2	38
10	Rubin Kazan	30	8	11	11	18	28	−10	35 (Note: Head-to-head points: Rubin Kazan 4, Ural 1)
11	Ural	30	9	8	13	36	53	−17	35
12	Sochi	30	8	9	13	40	39	+1	33

Source: Russian Premier Liga, Soccerway
Rules for classification: 1) Points; 2) Head-to-head points; 3) Head-to-head matches won; 4) Head-to-head goal difference; 5) Head-to-head goals scored; 6) Matches won; 7) Goal difference; 8) Goals scored; 9) Play-off.

==== Results by round ====
Round	1	2	3	4	5	6	7	8	9	10	11	12	13	14	15	16	17	18	19	20	21	22	23	24	25	26	27	28	29	30
Ground	A	A	H	H	A	H	A	H	A	A	H	H	A	H	A	H	H	A	A	A	H	A	A	H	A	H	H	A	H	H
Result	D	W	W	L	L	W	L	L	L	L	D	W	D	D	D	L	L	D	D	D	L	W	W	L	D	W	W	D	D	L
Position	10	7	3	4	8	7	8	9	10	10	13	11	9	9	12	13	14	13	13	14	15	14	11	12	12	12	9	9	10	10

Updated to match(es) played on 22 July 2020. Source: See Results
A = Away; H = Home; W = Win; D = Draw; L = Loss

==== Matches ====
15 July 2019 1	Lokomotiv Moscow	1 – 1	Rubin Kazan	Moscow
20:00 MSK (UTC+3)	An.Miranchuk (penalty missed) 23' (yellow card) 35'; Al.Miranchuk 66'; Murilo (yellow card) 90+1'	Report	Uremović (yellow card) 18'; Kvaratskhelia 76'; Denisov (yellow card) 82'; Markov (yellow card) 90+1'	Stadium: RZD Arena; Attendance: 10,732; Referee: Mikhail Vilkov

21 July 2019 2	Dynamo Moscow	0 – 1	Rubin Kazan	Moscow
19:00 MSK (UTC+3)	Panchenko (yellow card) 67'; Kaboré (yellow card) 72'; Szymański (yellow card) 81'	Report	Bashkirov (yellow card) 3' (yellow-red card) 36'; Davitashvili (yellow card) 63'; Stepanov (yellow card) 70'; Dyupin (yellow card) 90'; Kvaratskhelia (yellow card) 90+1'; Mikeltadze 90+3'; Podberyozkin (yellow card) 90+3'	Stadium: VTB Arena; Attendance: 17,315; Referee: Vitali Meshkov

29 July 2019 3	Rubin Kazan	1 – 0	Akhmat Grozny	Kazan
20:00 MSK (UTC+3)	Kjartansson 73'; Ig.Konovalov (yellow card) 74'; Danchenko (yellow card) 88'	Report	Ivanov (yellow card) 60'; Berisha (yellow card) 63'; Kharin (yellow card) 81'	Stadium: Central Stadium; Attendance: 11,342; Referee: Sergey Ivanov

4 August 2019 4	Rubin Kazan	0 – 1	CSKA Moscow	Kazan
19:00 MSK (UTC+3)	Mikeltadze (yellow card) 60'; Uremović (yellow card) 76'; Podberyozkin (yellow card) 85'	Report	Chalov 41'; Akhmetov (yellow card) 50'; Bistrović (yellow card) 64'; Oblyakov (yellow card) 66'	Stadium: Central Stadium; Attendance: 20,791; Referee: Vasili Kazartsev

10 August 2019 5	Krasnodar	1 – 0	Rubin Kazan	Saint Petersburg
19:00 MSK (UTC+3)	Cabella (yellow card) 13'; Ignatyev 17'; Namli (yellow card) 18' (yellow-red card) 45+2'; Suleymanov (yellow card) 80'	Report	Davitashvili (yellow card) 24'; Uremović (yellow card) 66'; Ig.Konovalov (yellow card) 90+1'	Stadium: Krestovsky Stadium; Attendance: 25,826; Referee: Sergey Lapochkin

18 August 2019 6	Rubin Kazan	1 – 0	Arsenal Tula	Kazan
14:00 MSK (UTC+3)	Markov 72'; Uremović (yellow card) 76'; Mikeltadze (yellow card) 89'	Report	Álvarez (yellow card) 74'; Grigalava (yellow card) 85'	Stadium: Ak Bars Arena; Attendance: 10,022; Referee: Vladislav Bezborodov

25 August 2019 7	Rostov	2 – 1	Rubin Kazan	Rostov-on-Don
19:00 MSK (UTC+3)	Shomurodov 29' (yellow card) 90+1'; Saplinov 87'	Report	Markov 15'	Stadium: Rostov Arena; Attendance: 35,031; Referee: Vitali Meshkov

31 August 2019 8	Rubin Kazan	0 – 3	Sochi	Kazan
14:00 MSK (UTC+3)	Bashkirov (yellow card) 15'; Davitashvili (yellow card) 20'; Stepanov (yellow card) 71'	Report	Tsallagov 22'; Lagator (yellow card) 29'; Burmistrov (yellow card) 37'; Kudryashov 52'; Zabolotny (yellow card) 76'; Karapetian 90+3'	Stadium: Central Stadium; Attendance: 8,845; Referee: Nikolay Voloshin

15 September 2019 9	Orenburg	2 – 1	Rubin Kazan	Orenburg
14:00 MSK (UTC+3)	Škoflek (yellow card) 13'; Alves 49'; Ayupov (yellow card) 77'; Kulishev 89' (pen.)	Report	Bashkirov 53' (yellow card) 54'; Stepanov (yellow card) 59'; Uremović (yellow card) 88'; Pliyev (yellow card) 90'	Stadium: Gazovik Stadium; Attendance: 4,767; Referee: Sergey Lapochkin

21 September 2019 10	Zenit St.Petersburg	5 – 0	Rubin Kazan	Saint Petersburg
19:00 MSK (UTC+3)	Ivanović 58'; Sutormin 65', 75'; Mak 82'; Shatov 87'	Report	Mogilevets (yellow card) 90+4'	Stadium: Krestovsky Stadium; Attendance: 43,598; Referee: Sergei Karasev

29 September 2019 11	Rubin Kazan	1 – 1	Ufa	Kazan
14:00 MSK (UTC+3)	Uremović (yellow card) 12'; Tashayev (yellow card) 57'; Markov (yellow card) 57'; Ig.Konovalov (yellow card) 87'	Report	Fomin (yellow card) 59'	Stadium: Central Stadium; Attendance: 8,314; Referee: Aleksei Matyunin

5 October 2019 12	Rubin Kazan	2 – 1	Tambov	Kazan
16:30 MSK (UTC+3)	Pliyev (yellow card) 4'; Ig.Konovalov 27'; Davitashvili 32'; Uremović (yellow card) 61'; Danchenko (yellow card) 68'; Kjartansson (yellow card) 77'; Dyupin (yellow card) 90+2'	Report	Oyewole (yellow card) 31'; Melkadze 54'; Kilin (yellow card) 89'	Stadium: Central Stadium; Attendance: 2,585; Referee: Aleksei Eskov

19 October 2019 13	Spartak Moscow	0 – 0	Rubin Kazan	Moscow
16:30 MSK (UTC+3)	Schürrle (yellow card) 48'	Report	Denisov (yellow card) 54'; Mogilevets (yellow card) 60'; Pliyev (yellow card) 90+1'	Stadium: Otkritie Arena; Attendance: 26,844; Referee: Sergey Lapochkin

25 October 2019 14	Rubin Kazan	0 – 0	Ural Yekaterinburg	Kazan
19:30 MSK (UTC+3)	Pliyev (yellow card) 53'; Sorokin (yellow card) 78'; Kvaratskhelia (yellow card) 90+3'	Report	Kulakov (yellow card) 27'; Ilyin (yellow card) 65'; Fidler (yellow card) 77'; Palyakow (yellow card) 90+1'	Stadium: Central Stadium; Attendance: 5,086; Referee: Vitaly Meshkov

4 November 2019 15	Krylia Sovetov	0 – 0	Rubin Kazan	Samara
16:30 MSK (UTC+3)	Chernov (yellow card) 18'; Gațcan (yellow card) 72'; Timofeyev (yellow card) 90+5'	Report	Poyarkov (yellow card) 7'; Ig.Konovalov (yellow card) 46'; Tashayev (yellow card) 61'; Kvaratskhelia (yellow card) 90+5'	Stadium: Samara Arena; Attendance: 10,842; Referee: Vladislav Bezborodov

9 November 2019 16	Rubin Kazan	0 – 1	Dynamo Moscow	Kazan
14:00 MSK (UTC+3)	Zuyev (yellow card) 26' (yellow-red card) 45'; Tashayev (yellow card) 51'; Davitashvili (yellow card) 72'	Report	Szymański 23'; N'Jie (yellow card) 30'; Ordets (yellow card) 34' (yellow-red card) 66'; Parshivlyuk (yellow card) 90'	Stadium: Central Stadium; Attendance: 4,757; Referee: Evgeny Turbin

23 November 2019 17	Rubin Kazan	1 – 2	Zenit St.Petersburg	Kazan
14:00 MSK (UTC+3)	Danchenko (yellow card) 51'; Sorokin (yellow card) 61'; Markov 66'; Ig.Konovalov (yellow card) 82'	Report	Azmoun 8'; Driussi (yellow card) 53'; Karavayev (yellow card) 62'; Dzyuba 79'	Stadium: Central Stadium; Attendance: 8,351; Referee: Sergey Ivanov

30 November 2019 18	Akhmat Grozny	1 – 1	Rubin Kazan	Grozny
19:00 MSK (UTC+3)	Glushakov 31'; Kharin (yellow card) 64'; Ismael (yellow card) 74'; Ivanov (yellow card) 83'	Report	Ig.Konovalov (yellow card) 35'; Uremović (yellow card) 63'; Kvaratskhelia 90+3'	Stadium: Akhmat-Arena; Attendance: 11,564; Referee: Igor Panin

8 December 2019 19	Sochi	1 – 1	Rubin Kazan	Sochi
16:30 MSK (UTC+3)	Lagator 39'; Koldunov (yellow card) 63'	Report	Markov 49' (yellow card) 85'	Stadium: Fisht Olympic Stadium; Attendance: 6,104; Referee: Sergey Lapochkin

1 March 2020 20	Tambov	0 – 0	Rubin Kazan	Nizhny Novgorod
14:00 MSK (UTC+3)	Oyewole (yellow card) 55'; Tetrashvili (yellow card) 57'	Report	Abildgaard (yellow card) 40'; Zuyev (yellow card) 67'	Stadium: Nizhny Novgorod Stadium; Attendance: 3,858; Referee: Aleksei Eskov
Note: Match played at the Nizhny Novgorod Stadium in Nizhny Novgorod instead of Tambov's regular Spartak Stadium.

8 March 2020 21	Rubin Kazan	0 – 1	Krylia Sovetov	Kazan
14:00 MSK (UTC+3)	Kvaratskhelia (yellow card) 17' (yellow-red card) 45+2'; Pablo (yellow card) 48'; Konovalov (yellow card) 72'	Report	Popović 42'; Kabutov (yellow card) 54'; Zinkovsky (yellow card) 62' (yellow-red card) 81'; Glushenkov (yellow card) 84'; Anton (yellow card) 90+1'	Stadium: Central Stadium; Attendance: 5,766; Referee: Vladimir Moskalev

14 March 2020 22	Arsenal Tula	0 – 1	Rubin Kazan	Tula
19:00 MSK (UTC+3)	Denisov (yellow card) 47'; Tkachyov (yellow card) 65'; Čaušić (yellow card) 90+3'	Report	Davitashvili 43' (yellow card) 79'; Makarov (yellow card) 45' (yellow-red card) 55'; Podberyozkin (yellow card) 48'; Ignatyev (yellow card) 52'	Stadium: Arsenal Stadium; Attendance: 8,831; Referee: Sergey Lapochkin

20 June 2020 23	Ural Yekaterinburg	1 – 2	Rubin Kazan	Yekaterinburg
14:00 MSK (UTC+3)	Pablo 7' (o.g.); El Kabir (yellow card) 37'; Bavin (yellow card) 78'; Yemelyanov (yellow card) 85'	Report	Kvaratskhelia 39'; Mogilevets (yellow card) 48'; Bakayev 56'; Podberyozkin (red card) 71'; Dyupin (yellow card) 89'	Stadium: Central Stadium; Referee: Vasili Kazartsev
Note: Match originally scheduled for 21 March, but postponed on 17 March due to the COVID-19 pandemic.

27 June 2020 24	Rubin Kazan	0 – 2	Lokomotiv Moscow	Kazan
17:30 MSK (UTC+3)	Bakayev (yellow card) 16'; Starfelt (yellow card) 28'; Jevtić (yellow card) 51'	Report	Al.Miranchuk 23', 29' (pen.); Rybus (yellow card) 63'; João Mário (yellow card) 72'; Barinov (yellow card) 74'; Ignatyev (yellow card) 89'	Stadium: Ak Bars Arena; Referee: Nikolay Voloshin
Note: Match originally scheduled for 4 April, but postponed on 17 March due to the COVID-19 pandemic.

30 June 2020 25	Ufa	0 – 0	Rubin Kazan	Ufa
15:00 MSK (UTC+3)	Nedelcearu (yellow card) 22'; Krotov (yellow card) 26'; Carp (yellow card) 28'	Report	Uremović (yellow card) 74'; Samoshnikov (yellow card) 82'	Stadium: Neftyanik Stadium; Referee: Evgeny Turbin
Note: Match originally scheduled for 10 April, but postponed on 1 April due to the COVID-19 pandemic.

5 July 2020 26	Rubin Kazan	1 – 0	Orenburg	Kazan
18:30 MSK (UTC+3)	Makarov 67'; Samoshnikov (yellow card) 85'; Starfelt (yellow card) 90+2'	Report	Kulishev (yellow card) 23'; Zotov (yellow card) 72'	Stadium: Ak Bars Arena; Referee: Kirill Levnikov
Note: Match originally scheduled for 18 April, but postponed on 1 April due to the COVID-19 pandemic.

9 July 2020 27	Rubin Kazan	1 – 0	Krasnodar	Kazan
20:30 MSK (UTC+3)	Makarov 51'; Abildgaard (yellow card) 57'	Report	Vilhena (yellow card) 32'; Suleymanov (yellow card) 59'; Fernandes (yellow card) 66'; Kaio (yellow card) 90+4'; Gazinsky (yellow card) 90+4'	Stadium: Ak Bars Arena; Referee: Stanislav Vasilyev
Note: Match originally scheduled for 25 April, but postponed on 1 April due to the COVID-19 pandemic.

11 July 2020 28	CSKA Moscow	1 – 1	Rubin Kazan	Moscow
18:30 MSK (UTC+3)	Sigurðsson (yellow card) 17'; Maradishvili (yellow card) 24'; Chalov 62'; Oblyakov (yellow card) 69'; Fernandes (yellow card) 81'; Magnússon (yellow card) 90'; Kuchayev (yellow card) 90+6'	Report	Jevtić (yellow card) 21'; Zuyev (yellow card) 68'; Uremović (yellow card) 78'; Markov 88' (pen.); Tarasov (yellow card) 90+2'	Stadium: VEB Arena; Referee: Aleksey Matyunin
Note: Match originally scheduled for 3 May, but postponed on 1 April due to the COVID-19 pandemic.

16 July 2020 29	Rubin Kazan	0 – 0	Rostov	Kazan
18:00 MSK (UTC+3)	Samoshnikov (yellow card) 52'; Tarasov (yellow card) 66'; Pablo (yellow card) 81'; Uremović (yellow card) 85'	Report	Chernov (yellow card) 18'; Popov (yellow card) 23'; Bayramyan (yellow card) 38'; Glebov (yellow card) 45+1'; Dolgov (yellow card) 80'	Stadium: Ak Bars Arena; Referee: Vasiliy Kazantsev
Note: Match originally scheduled for 11 May, but postponed on 1 April due to the COVID-19 pandemic.

22 July 2020 30	Rubin Kazan	1 – 2	Spartak Moscow	Kazan
19:00 MSK (UTC+3)	Samoshnikov (yellow card) 4'; Starfelt (yellow card) 38'; Ignatyev 44' (pen.); Konovalov (yellow card) 63'; Uremović (yellow card) 70'; Kvaratskhelia (yellow card) 90'	Report	Ponce (yellow card) 33'; Bakayev 40' (pen.); Larsson 71' (pen.); Rasskazov (yellow card) 74'; Dzhikiya (yellow card) 82'; Sobolev (yellow card) 90+2'	Stadium: Ak Bars Arena; Referee: Pavel Kukuyan
Note: Match originally scheduled for 17 May, but postponed on 1 April due to the COVID-19 pandemic.

=== Russian Cup ===
25 September 2019 Round of 32	Khimki	3 – 0	Rubin Kazan	Khimki
19:00 MSK (UTC+3)	Koryan 7' (pen.); Skvortsov (yellow card) 44'; Kukharchuk 47'; Tikhiy (yellow card) 80'; Gapon 84'	Report	Pliyev (yellow card) 6'; Konovalov (yellow card) 84'; Tashayev (yellow card) 90+'	Stadium: Rodina Stadium; Attendance: 2,600; Referee: Pavel Kukuyan

== Squad statistics ==
As of match played 22 July 2020

=== Appearances and goals ===
No.	Pos	Nat	Player	Total		Premier League		Russian Cup	
No.	Pos	Nat	Player	Apps	Goals	Apps	Goals	Apps	Goals
2	DF	(Sweden) SWE	Carl Starfelt	11	0	10	0	1	0
3	DF	(Russia) RUS	Konstantin Pliyev	13	0	11+1	0	1	0
5	DF	(Croatia) CRO	Filip Uremović	25	0	25	0	0	0
7	MF	(Russia) RUS	Vyacheslav Podberyozkin	22	0	19+2	0	0+1	0
8	MF	(Switzerland) SUI	Darko Jevtić	10	0	8+2	0	0	0
10	MF	(Russia) RUS	Igor Konovalov	30	1	27+2	1	1	0
11	MF	(Georgia (country)) GEO	Zuriko Davitashvili	26	2	19+7	2	0	0
12	MF	(Russia) RUS	Aleksandr Zuyev	18	0	17	0	0+1	0
15	MF	(Russia) RUS	Dmitri Tarasov	4	0	0+4	0	0	0
18	MF	(Russia) RUS	Pavel Mogilevets	21	0	16+4	0	1	0
19	FW	(Russia) RUS	Ivan Ignatyev	11	1	11	1	0	0
20	FW	(Russia) RUS	Yevgeni Markov	22	5	9+13	5	0	0
21	MF	(Georgia (country)) GEO	Khvicha Kvaratskhelia	27	3	14+12	3	1	0
22	GK	(Russia) RUS	Yury Dyupin	30	0	30	0	0	0
23	GK	(Russia) RUS	Ivan Konovalov	1	0	0	0	1	0
25	MF	(Russia) RUS	Denis Makarov	9	2	5+4	2	0	0
27	DF	(Brazil) BRA	Pablo	9	0	9	0	0	0
28	MF	(Denmark) DEN	Oliver Abildgaard	11	0	10+1	0	0	0
33	DF	(Ukraine) UKR	Oleh Danchenko	20	0	19	0	0+1	0
59	MF	(Russia) RUS	Nikita Makarov	3	0	1+2	0	0	0
69	DF	(Russia) RUS	Danil Stepanov	9	0	7+2	0	0	0
71	DF	(Russia) RUS	Nikolai Poyarkov	7	0	6+1	0	0	0
77	DF	(Russia) RUS	Ilya Samoshnikov	6	0	5+1	0	0	0
87	MF	(Russia) RUS	Soltmurad Bakayev	10	1	3+7	1	0	0
88	MF	(Russia) RUS	Aleksandr Tashayev	8	0	7	0	1	0
99	MF	(Russia) RUS	Kamil Zakirov	3	0	1+2	0	0	0
Players away from the club on loan:
26	FW	(Georgia (country)) GEO	Beka Mikeltadze	11	1	3+8	1	0	0
70	MF	(Russia) RUS	Nikolai Kipiani	2	0	0+2	0	0	0
Players who left Rubin Kazan during the season:
6	MF	(Russia) RUS	Yevgeni Bashkirov	11	1	8+2	1	1	0
8	FW	(Iceland) ISL	Viðar Örn Kjartansson	17	1	10+6	1	1	0
29	DF	(Uzbekistan) UZB	Vitaliy Denisov	9	0	7+1	0	1	0
77	MF	(Russia) RUS	Roman Akbashev	1	0	0+1	0	0	0
80	DF	(Russia) RUS	Yegor Sorokin	15	0	13+1	0	1	0

=== Goal scorers ===
Place	Position	Nation	Number	Name	Premier League	Russian Cup	Total
1	FW	(Russia)	20	Yevgeni Markov	5	0	5
2	MF	(Georgia (country))	21	Khvicha Kvaratskhelia	3	0	3
3	MF	(Georgia (country))	11	Zuriko Davitashvili	2	0	2
3	MF	(Russia)	25	Denis Makarov	2	0	2
5	FW	(Georgia (country))	26	Beka Mikeltadze	1	0	1
5	FW	(Iceland)	8	Viðar Örn Kjartansson	1	0	1
5	MF	(Russia)	6	Yevgeni Bashkirov	1	0	1
5	MF	(Russia)	10	Igor Konovalov	1	0	1
5	MF	(Russia)	87	Soltmurad Bakayev	1	0	1
5	FW	(Russia)	19	Ivan Ignatyev	1	0	1
				TOTALS	18	0	18

=== Clean sheets ===
Place	Position	Nation	Number	Name	Premier League	Russian Cup	Total
1	GK	(Russia)	22	Yury Dyupin	12	0	12
				TOTALS	12	0	12

=== Disciplinary record ===
Number	Nation	Position	Name	Premier League		Russian Cup		Total	
Number	Nation	Position	Name	Yellow card	Red card	Yellow card	Red card	Yellow card	Red card
2	(Sweden)	DF	Carl Starfelt	3	0	0	0	3	0
3	(Russia)	DF	Konstantin Pliyev	4	0	1	0	5	0
5	(Croatia)	DF	Filip Uremović	12	0	0	0	12	0
7	(Russia)	MF	Vyacheslav Podberyozkin	3	1	0	0	3	1
8	(Switzerland)	MF	Darko Jevtić	2	0	0	0	2	0
10	(Russia)	MF	Igor Konovalov	8	0	0	0	8	0
11	(Georgia (country))	MF	Zuriko Davitashvili	5	0	0	0	5	0
12	(Russia)	MF	Aleksandr Zuyev	4	1	0	0	4	1
15	(Russia)	MF	Dmitri Tarasov	2	0	0	0	2	0
18	(Russia)	MF	Pavel Mogilevets	3	0	0	0	3	0
19	(Russia)	FW	Ivan Ignatyev	1	0	0	0	1	0
20	(Russia)	FW	Yevgeni Markov	3	0	0	0	3	0
21	(Georgia (country))	MF	Khvicha Kvaratskhelia	6	1	0	0	6	1
22	(Russia)	GK	Yury Dyupin	3	0	0	0	3	0
23	(Russia)	GK	Ivan Konovalov	0	0	1	0	1	0
25	(Russia)	MF	Denis Makarov	2	1	0	0	2	1
27	(Brazil)	DF	Pablo	2	0	0	0	2	0
28	(Denmark)	MF	Oliver Abildgaard	2	0	0	0	2	0
33	(Ukraine)	DF	Oleh Danchenko	3	0	0	0	3	0
69	(Russia)	DF	Danil Stepanov	3	0	0	0	3	0
71	(Russia)	DF	Nikolai Poyarkov	1	0	0	0	1	0
77	(Russia)	DF	Ilya Samoshnikov	4	0	0	0	4	0
87	(Russia)	MF	Soltmurad Bakayev	1	0	0	0	1	0
88	(Russia)	MF	Aleksandr Tashayev	3	0	1	0	4	0
Players away on loan:
26	(Georgia (country))	FW	Beka Mikeltadze	2	0	0	0	2	0
Players who left Rubin Kazan during the season:
6	(Russia)	MF	Yevgeni Bashkirov	4	1	0	0	4	1
8	(Iceland)	FW	Viðar Örn Kjartansson	1	0	0	0	1	0
29	(Uzbekistan)	DF	Vitaliy Denisov	2	0	0	0	2	0
80	(Russia)	DF	Yegor Sorokin	2	0	0	0	2	0
			TOTALS	91	5	3	0	94	5
