= Danil Stepanov =

Russian footballer (born 2000)

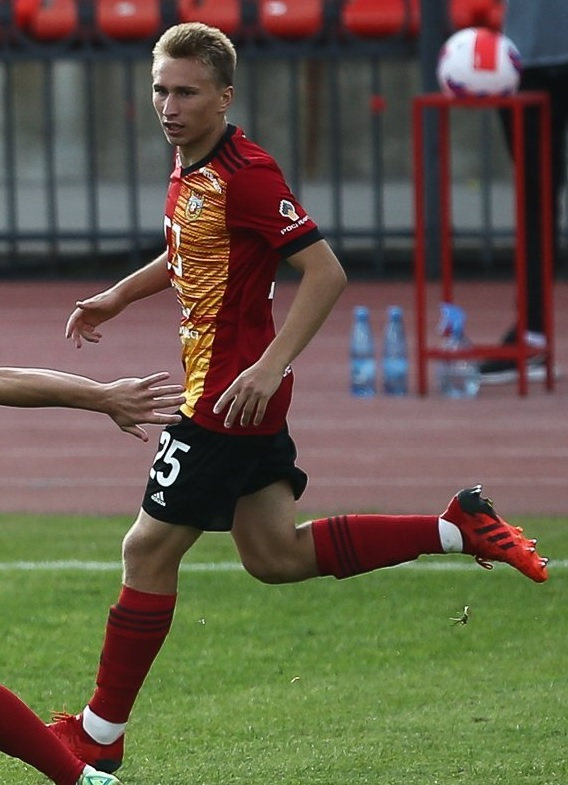
- Stepanov with Arsenal Tula in 2021

Personal information
- Full name: Danil Andreyevich Stepanov
- Date of birth: 25 January 2000 (age 26)
- Place of birth: Kazan, Russia
- Height: 1.73 m (5 ft 8 in)
- Positions: Left midfielder; left-back

Team information
- Current team: Volga Ulyanovsk
- Number: 5

Youth career
- 2005–2007: DYuSSh Tasma Kazan
- 2007–2018: Rubin Kazan

Senior career*
Years	Team	Apps	(Gls)
2018–2021	Rubin Kazan	19	(0)
2020–2021	→ Rotor Volgograd (loan)	22	(1)
2021	→ Arsenal Tula (loan)	16	(1)
2022–2023	Arsenal Tula	26	(0)
2023–2025	Khimki	47	(2)
2025–2026	Torpedo Moscow	8	(0)
2026	Shakhtyor Donetsk	10	(1)
2026–	Volga Ulyanovsk	0	(0)

International career^{‡}
2016–2017	Russia U-17	11	(0)
2019–2021	Russia U-21	12	(0)
- * Club domestic league appearances and goals as of 27 June 2026 ‡ National team caps and goals as of 16 November 2021

Danil Andreyevich Stepanov (Russian: Данил Андреевич Степанов; born 25 January 2000) is a Russian professional football player who plays as a left midfielder or left-back for Volga Ulyanovsk.

== Club career ==
Stepanov made his debut in the Russian Premier League for Rubin Kazan on 9 December 2018 in a game against Zenit St. Petersburg, as a 63rd-minute substitute for Rail Abdullin.

On 17 July 2020, he joined Rotor Volgograd on loan for the 2020–21 season.

On 29 May 2021, Stepanov was loaned to Arsenal Tula for the 2021–22 season, with an option to purchase. On 29 December 2021, Arsenal exercised the purchase option and signed a long-term contract with Stepanov.

== Career statistics ==
As of match played 24 May 2025

Appearances and goals by club, season and competition
Club	Season	League			Cup		Europe		Total	
Club	Season	Division	Apps	Goals	Apps	Goals	Apps	Goals	Apps	Goals
Rubin Kazan	2018–19	Russian Premier League	10	0	1	0	—		11	0
Rubin Kazan	2019–20	Russian Premier League	9	0	0	0	—		9	0
Rubin Kazan	Total		19	0	1	0	—		20	0
Rotor Volgograd (loan)	2020–21	Russian Premier League	22	1	0	0	—		22	1
Arsenal Tula (loan)	2021–22	Russian Premier League	16	1	1	0	—		17	1
Arsenal Tula	2021–22	Russian Premier League	12	0	1	0	—		13	0
Arsenal Tula	2022–23	Russian First League	14	0	1	0	—		15	0
Arsenal Tula	Total		26	0	2	0	—		38	0
Khimki	2023–24	Russian First League	32	2	4	0	—		36	2
Khimki	2024–25	Russian Premier League	15	0	5	0	—		20	0
Khimki	Total		47	2	9	0	—		56	2
Career total			130	4	13	0	0	0	143	4
