= Vyacheslav Podberyozkin =

Russian footballer

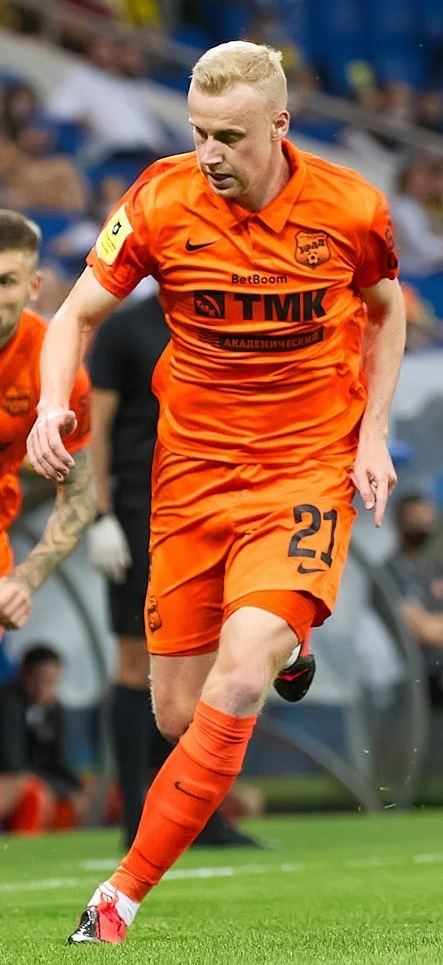
- Podberyozkin with Ural Yekaterinburg in 2020

Personal information
- Full name: Vyacheslav Mikhailovich Podberyozkin
- Date of birth: 21 June 1992 (age 34)
- Place of birth: Moscow, Russia
- Height: 1.87 m (6 ft 2 in)
- Position: Attacking midfielder

Youth career
- 2000–2002: FC Kuntsevo Moscow
- 2002–2010: PFC CSKA Moscow
- 2012–2013: FC Lokomotiv Moscow

Senior career*
Years	Team	Apps	(Gls)
2010–2011	FC KAIT-Sport Moscow		
2011–2014	FC Lokomotiv Moscow	2	(0)
2013	→ FC Lokomotiv-2 Moscow	16	(0)
2014	→ FC Khimki (loan)	9	(2)
2014–2015	FC Ural Yekaterinburg	33	(2)
2016–2018	FC Krasnodar	32	(1)
2018	→ FC Rubin Kazan (loan)	7	(1)
2018–2020	FC Rubin Kazan	42	(1)
2020–2023	FC Ural Yekaterinburg	53	(1)
2023–2024	FC SKA-Khabarovsk	20	(0)

International career
2009	Russia U-17	7	(0)
2010	Russia U-18	4	(1)
2011	Russia U-19	2	(0)
2012–2013	Russia U-21	2	(0)
- * Club domestic league appearances and goals

Vyacheslav Mikhailovich Podberyozkin (Russian: Вячеслав Михайлович Подберёзкин; born 21 June 1992) is a Russian former professional football player. He primarily played as an attacking midfielder though he has also played as a winger, wide midfielder or central midfielder.

== Club career ==
He made his Russian Premier League debut for FC Lokomotiv Moscow on 22 April 2012 in a game against FC Rubin Kazan.

Podberyozkin signed for Krasnodar on 31 December 2015.

On 5 January 2018 he joined FC Rubin Kazan on loan.

On 29 May 2018 he moved to Rubin on a permanent basis, signing a 3-year contract.

On 18 August 2020 he returned to FC Ural Yekaterinburg.

== Career statistics ==
=== Club ===
As of 27 November 2022

Club	Season	League			Cup		Continental		Total	
Club	Season	Division	Apps	Goals	Apps	Goals	Apps	Goals	Apps	Goals
Lokomotiv Moscow	2011–12	Premier League	1	0	0	0	0	0	1	0
Lokomotiv Moscow	2012–13	Premier League	1	0	1	0	–		2	0
Lokomotiv Moscow	Total		2	0	1	0	0	0	3	0
Lokomotiv-2 Moscow	2013–14	Second League	16	0	1	0	–		17	0
Khimki	2013–14	Second League	9	2	–		–		9	2
Ural Yekaterinburg	2014–15	Premier League	20	0	0	0	–		20	0
Ural Yekaterinburg	2015–16	Premier League	13	2	1	1	–		14	3
Krasnodar	2015–16	Premier League	8	1	0	0	0	0	8	1
Krasnodar	2016–17	Premier League	14	0	2	0	9 (Note: Appearances in the UEFA Europa League)	0	25	0
Krasnodar	2017–18	Premier League	10	0	1	0	0	0	11	0
Krasnodar	Total		32	1	3	0	9	0	44	1
Rubin Kazan	2017–18	Premier League	7	1	–		–		7	1
Rubin Kazan	2018–19	Premier League	21	1	3	0	–		24	1
Rubin Kazan	2019–20	Premier League	21	0	1	0	–		22	0
Rubin Kazan	2020–21	Premier League	0	0	–		–		0	0
Rubin Kazan	Total		49	2	4	0	0	0	53	2
Ural Yekaterinburg	2020–21	Premier League	19	1	0	0	–		19	1
Ural Yekaterinburg	2021–22	Premier League	21	0	2	0	–		23	0
Ural Yekaterinburg	2022–23	Premier League	10	0	3	0	–		13	0
Ural Yekaterinburg	Total (2 spells)		83	3	6	1	0	0	89	4
Career total			191	8	15	1	9	0	215	9
