= Igor Konovalov =

Russian footballer

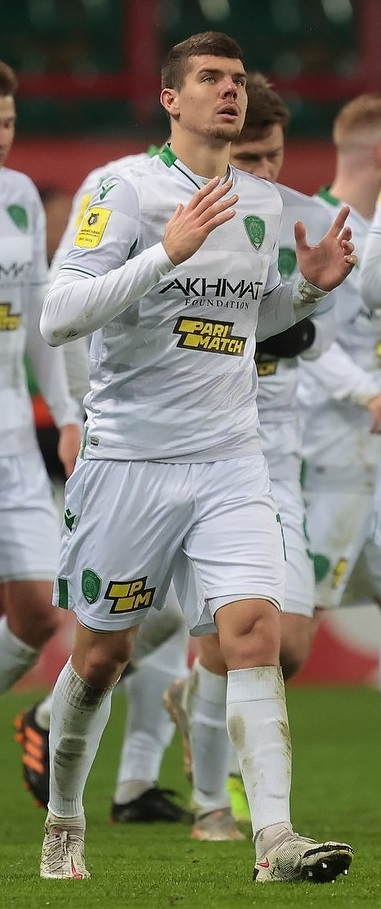
- Konovalov with Akhmat Grozny in 2021

Personal information
- Full name: Igor Olegovich Konovalov
- Date of birth: 8 July 1996 (age 30)
- Place of birth: Belorechensk, Russia
- Height: 1.85 m (6 ft 1 in)
- Position: Midfielder

Team information
- Current team: KDV Tomsk
- Number: 17

Youth career
- –2007: DYuSSh Yunost Belorechensk
- 2007–2014: Spartak Moscow
- 2014: Vityaz Podolsk
- 2014–2015: Kuban Krasnodar

Senior career*
Years	Team	Apps	(Gls)
2015–2017	Kuban Krasnodar	39	(2)
2016–2017	→ Kuban-2 Krasnodar	19	(3)
2018–2023	Rubin Kazan	70	(2)
2021	→ Arsenal Tula (loan)	9	(0)
2021–2022	→ Akhmat Grozny (loan)	25	(3)
2022–2023	→ Ural Yekaterinburg (loan)	6	(0)
2024	SKA-Khabarovsk	13	(0)
2024	Torpedo Moscow	2	(0)
2025	Dynamo Brest	23	(1)
2026	Chernomorets Novorossiysk	10	(0)
2026–	KDV Tomsk	8	(1)

International career^{‡}
2017–2018	Russia U21	5	(0)
- * Club domestic league appearances and goals as of 1 November 2026 ‡ National team caps and goals as of 16 October 2018

Igor Olegovich Konovalov (Russian: Игорь Олегович Коновалов; born 8 July 1996) is a Russian professional football player who plays as a central midfielder for KDV Tomsk.

== Club career ==
He made his professional debut on 31 July 2015 for Kuban Krasnodar in a Russian Premier League game against Ufa.

On 22 February 2018, he signed a long-term contract with Rubin Kazan.

On 12 January 2021, he was loaned to Arsenal Tula until the end of the 2020–21 season.

On 12 July 2021, he joined Akhmat Grozny on loan for the 2021–22 season.

On 17 June 2022, Konovalov was loaned to Ural Yekaterinburg for the 2022–23 season.

On 26 January 2024, Konovalov moved to SKA-Khabarovsk and signed a contract until the end of the 2023–24 season.

== Career statistics ==
As of 16 May 2026

Club	Season	League			Cup		Continental		Other		Total	
Club	Season	Division	Apps	Goals	Apps	Goals	Apps	Goals	Apps	Goals	Apps	Goals
Kuban Krasnodar	2015–16	Russian Premier League	3	0	1	0	—		0 (Note: Appearances in relegation play-offs)	0	4	0
Kuban Krasnodar	2016–17	Russian First League	13	1	1	0	—		4 (Note: Appearances in FNL Cup)	0	18	1
Kuban Krasnodar	2017–18	Russian First League	23	1	2	0	—		—		25	1
Kuban Krasnodar	Total		39	2	4	0	0	0	4	0	47	2
Kuban-2 Krasnodar	2016–17	Russian Second League	17	3	—		—		—		17	3
Kuban-2 Krasnodar	2017–18	Russian Second League	2	0	—		—		—		2	0
Kuban-2 Krasnodar	Total		19	3	0	0	0	0	0	0	19	3
Rubin Kazan	2017–18	Russian Premier League	7	0	—		—		—		7	0
Rubin Kazan	2018–19	Russian Premier League	27	1	2	0	—		—		29	1
Rubin Kazan	2019–20	Russian Premier League	29	1	1	0	—		—		30	1
Rubin Kazan	2020–21	Russian Premier League	6	0	1	0	—		—		7	0
Rubin Kazan	2023–24	Russian Premier League	1	0	3	0	—		—		4	0
Rubin Kazan	Total		70	2	7	0	0	0	0	0	77	2
Arsenal Tula (loan)	2020–21	Russian Premier League	9	0	1	0	—		—		10	0
Akhmat Grozny (loan)	2021–22	Russian Premier League	25	3	2	0	—		—		27	3
Ural Yekaterinburg (loan)	2022–23	Russian Premier League	6	0	0	0	—		—		6	0
SKA-Khabarovsk	2023–24	Russian First League	13	0	2	0	—		—		15	0
Torpedo Moscow	2024–25	Russian First League	2	0	—		—		—		2	0
Dynamo Brest	2025	Belarusian Premier League	23	1	1	0	2 (Note: Appearances in the UEFA Conference League)	0	—		26	1
Chernomorets	2025–26	Russian First League	10	0	—		—		—		10	0
Career total			216	11	17	0	2	0	4	0	239	11
