= Maksim Sedov =

Russian footballer

Personal information
- Full name: Maksim Sergeyevich Sedov
- Date of birth: 2 July 2000 (age 26)
- Place of birth: Perm, Russia
- Height: 1.78 m (5 ft 10 in)
- Position: Midfielder

Team information
- Current team: FC Saturn Ramenskoye
- Number: 8

Youth career
- –2018: FC Amkar Perm
- 2018–2019: FC Rubin Kazan

Senior career*
Years	Team	Apps	(Gls)
2019–2020	FC Rubin Kazan	0	(0)
2020–2021	FC Fakel Voronezh	17	(0)
2020–2021	FC Fakel-M Voronezh	13	(0)
2022	FC SKA Rostov-on-Don	12	(0)
2023	FC Amkar Perm	5	(1)
2023–2024	FC Leon Saturn Ramenskoye	26	(2)
2024–2025	FC Veles Moscow	18	(0)
2025–2026	FC Murom	12	(1)
2026–	FC Saturn Ramenskoye	26	(3)
- * Club domestic league appearances and goals as of 31 October 2026

Maksim Sergeyevich Sedov (Russian: Максим Сергеевич Седов; born 2 July 2000) is a Russian football player who plays for FC Saturn Ramenskoye.

== Club career ==
He made his debut in the Russian Football National League for FC Fakel Voronezh on 1 August 2020 in a game against FC Akron Tolyatti, he substituted Pavel Yakovlev in the 79th minute.
