= Roman Akbashev =

Russian footballer

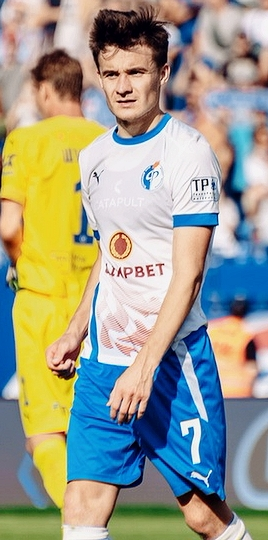
- Akbashev with Fakel in 2022

Personal information
- Full name: Roman Radikovich Akbashev
- Date of birth: 1 November 1991 (age 35)
- Place of birth: Sterlitamak, Russian SFSR
- Height: 1.78 m (5 ft 10 in)
- Position: Midfielder

Team information
- Current team: KAMAZ
- Number: 99

Senior career*
Years	Team	Apps	(Gls)
2008–2010	KAMAZ	0	(0)
2011–2012	Dynamo Kirov	20	(3)
2012	Avangard Kursk	0	(0)
2013–2015	KAMAZ	68	(13)
2016	Avangard Kursk	9	(3)
2016–2017	Volgar Astrakhan	51	(11)
2017–2018	Avangard Kursk	33	(11)
2019	Rubin Kazan	6	(0)
2020	Neftekhimik Nizhnekamsk	2	(1)
2020–2023	Fakel Voronezh	100	(21)
2023–2024	Rostov	6	(0)
2024	Fakel Voronezh	12	(0)
2024	KAMAZ	9	(0)
2024–2025	Chernomorets Novorossiysk	19	(9)
2025–2026	Ural Yekaterinburg	28	(7)
2026–	KAMAZ	0	(0)
- * Club domestic league appearances and goals as of 16 May 2026

Roman Radikovich Akbashev (Russian: Роман Радикович Акбашев; born 1 November 1991) is a Russian football attacking midfielder who plays for KAMAZ.

== Club career ==
Akbashev made his debut in the Russian Second Division for Dynamo Kirov on 4 August 2011 in a game against Volga Ulyanovsk.

He played in the 2017–18 Russian Cup final for Avangard Kursk on 9 May 2018 in the Volgograd Arena against 2–1 winners Tosno.

On 28 January 2019, Akbashev signed a 3.5-year contract with Rubin Kazan. He made his Russian Premier League debut for Rubin on 7 April 2019 in a game against Arsenal Tula.

On 27 January 2020, Akbashev moved to Neftekhimik Nizhnekamsk.

Akbashev left Fakel Voronezh in June 2023 by the end of his contract.

On 20 June 2023, Akbashev signed a two-year contract with Rostov. On 14 January 2024, his contract with Rostov was terminated by mutual consent. Three days later, he returned to Fakel Voronezh. On 28 May 2024, Akbashev left Fakel as his contract expired.

== Career statistics ==
As of match played 25 May 2024

Appearances and goals by club, season and competition
Club	Season	League			Cup		Continental		Other		Total	
Club	Season	Division	Apps	Goals	Apps	Goals	Apps	Goals	Apps	Goals	Apps	Goals
KAMAZ Naberezhnye Chelny	2008	Russian First League	0	0	0	0	–		–		0	0
KAMAZ Naberezhnye Chelny	2010	Russian First League	0	0	0	0	–		–		0	0
Dynamo Kirov	2011–12	Russian Second League	20	3	–		–		–		20	3
Avangard Kursk	2012–13	Russian Second League	0	0	0	0	–		–		0	0
KAMAZ Naberezhnye Chelny	2013–14	Russian Second League	26	6	1	0	–		–		27	6
KAMAZ Naberezhnye Chelny	2014–15	Russian Second League	24	4	1	0	–		–		25	4
KAMAZ Naberezhnye Chelny	2015–16	Russian First League	18	3	1	0	–		–		19	3
KAMAZ Naberezhnye Chelny	Total		68	13	3	0	0	0	0	0	71	13
Avangard Kursk	2015–16	Russian Second League	9	3	–		–		–		9	3
Volgar Astrakhan	2016–17	Russian First League	28	7	0	0	–		5 (Note: Appearances in the FNL Cup)	1	33	8
Volgar Astrakhan	2017–18	Russian First League	23	4	0	0	–		–		23	4
Volgar Astrakhan	Total		51	11	0	0	0	0	5	1	56	12
Avangard Kursk	2017–18	Russian First League	10	1	1	0	–		–		11	1
Avangard Kursk	2018–19	Russian First League	23	10	2	1	–		–		25	11
Avangard Kursk	Total		42	14	3	1	0	0	0	0	45	15
Rubin Kazan	2018–19	Russian Premier League	5	0	1	0	–		–		6	0
Rubin Kazan	2019–20	Russian Premier League	1	0	0	0	–		–		1	0
Rubin Kazan	Total		6	0	1	0	0	0	0	0	7	0
Neftekhimik Nizhnekamsk	2019–20	Russian First League	2	1	–		–		–		2	1
Fakel Voronezh	2020–21	Russian First League	37	6	1	0	–		–		38	6
Fakel Voronezh	2021–22	Russian First League	35	8	1	0	–		–		36	8
Fakel Voronezh	2022–23	Russian Premier League	28	7	4	0	–		2 (Note: Appearances in Relegation play-offs)	2	34	9
Fakel Voronezh	Total		100	21	6	0	0	0	2	2	108	23
Rostov	2023–24	Russian Premier League	6	0	6	0	–		–		12	0
Fakel Voronezh	2023–24	Russian Premier League	12	0	–		–		–		12	0
Career total			307	63	19	1	0	0	7	3	333	67
