= Artur Sagitov =

Russian footballer (born 2000)

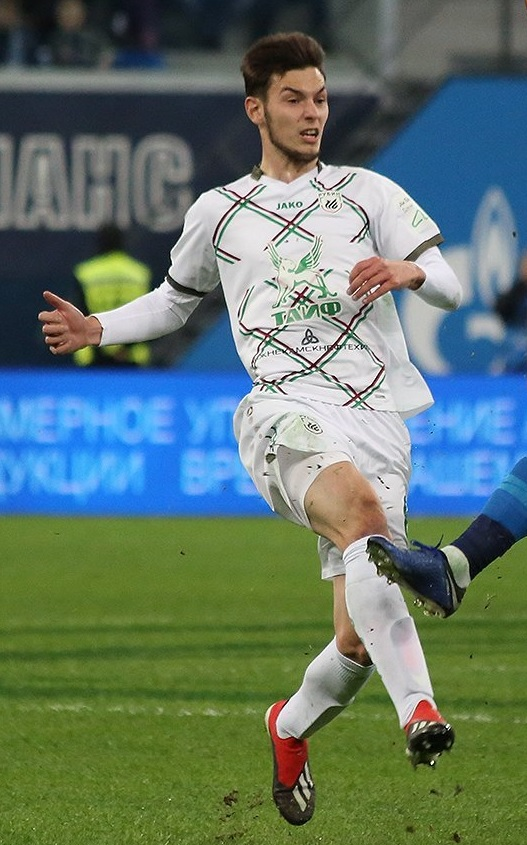
- Sagitov with Rubin Kazan in 2018

Personal information
- Full name: Artur Damirovich Sagitov
- Date of birth: 7 January 2000 (age 26)
- Place of birth: Yelabuga, Tatarstan, Russia
- Height: 1.85 m (6 ft 1 in)
- Position: Forward

Youth career
- 2017–2018: Rubin Kazan

Senior career*
Years	Team	Apps	(Gls)
2018–2020	Rubin Kazan	13	(1)
2019–2020	→ Nizhny Novgorod (loan)	13	(3)
2020	→ Volgar Astrakhan (loan)	10	(0)
2021	Smorgon	6	(0)
2022	Saturn Ramenskoye	3	(0)
2022–2023	Primorje	22	(5)
2023–2024	CS Bosa Calcio		
2024	Smorgon	5	(0)
2024	GS Iglesias Calcio		
2025	Murom	11	(0)
2025–2026	Molodechno	24	(7)
- * Club domestic league appearances and goals as of 1 September 2026

Artur Damirovich Sagitov (Russian: Артур Дамирович Сагитов; born 7 January 2000) is a Russian football player who plays as a centre-forward.

== Club career ==
He made his debut in the Russian Premier League for FC Rubin Kazan on 30 November 2018 in a game against FC Dynamo Moscow, as a 90th-minute substitute for Khoren Bayramyan.

On 2 March 2019, he scored his first league goal for Rubin in the 5th minute of added time in a game against FC Akhmat Grozny, giving his team a 1–0 victory after coming in as a substitute 13 minutes earlier.

On 12 August 2019, he joined FC Nizhny Novgorod on loan until 31 May 2020.

For 2020–21 season, he moved on another FNL loan to FC Volgar Astrakhan.

On 18 January 2021, his contract with Rubin was terminated by mutual consent.

On 27 June 2022, Sagitov moved to Primorje in Slovenia.

On 12 February 2024, Sagitov returned to Smorgon.
