= Vladislav Mikushin =

Russian footballer

Personal information
- Full name: Vladislav Arkadievich Mikushin
- Date of birth: 18 April 2001 (age 25)
- Place of birth: Tomsk, Russia
- Height: 1.87 m (6 ft 2 in)
- Position: Defender

Team information
- Current team: FC Bishkek City

Youth career
- –2015: FC Tom Tomsk
- 2016: SDYuSShOR Lider Seversk
- 2017–2018: FC Rubin Kazan

Senior career*
Years	Team	Apps	(Gls)
2019–2021	FC Rubin Kazan	0	(0)
2019–2020	→ FC Fakel Voronezh (loan)	14	(0)
2020	→ FC Neftekhimik Nizhnekamsk (loan)	3	(0)
2020–2021	→ FC Leningradets Leningrad Oblast (loan)	10	(0)
2021–2022	FC Yenisey Krasnoyarsk	1	(0)
2021–2022	→ FC Yenisey-2 Krasnoyarsk	17	(0)
2022–2023	FC Leningradets Leningrad Oblast	34	(3)
2024	FC Torpedo Moscow	2	(0)
2024–2026	FC Leningradets Leningrad Oblast	18	(1)
2026–	FC Bishkek City	0	(0)

International career^{‡}
2018–2019	Russia U-18	13	(1)
2019–2020	Russia U-19	5	(1)
- * Club domestic league appearances and goals as of 16 November 2025 ‡ National team caps and goals as of 11 February 2020

Vladislav Arkadyevich Mikushin (Russian: Владислав Аркадьевич Микушин; born 18 April 2001) is a Russian football player who plays for Kyrgyz Premier League club FC Bishkek City.

== Club career ==
He made his debut for FC Rubin Kazan on 6 March 2019 in a Russian Cup game against FC Lokomotiv Moscow.

On 19 July 2019, he joined FC Fakel Voronezh on loan. He made his Russian Football National League debut for Fakel on 28 July 2019 in a game against FC SKA-Khabarovsk.

On 28 September 2020, he moved on loan to FC Leningradets Leningrad Oblast.
