= Ak Bars Arena =

Stadium in Kazan, Russia

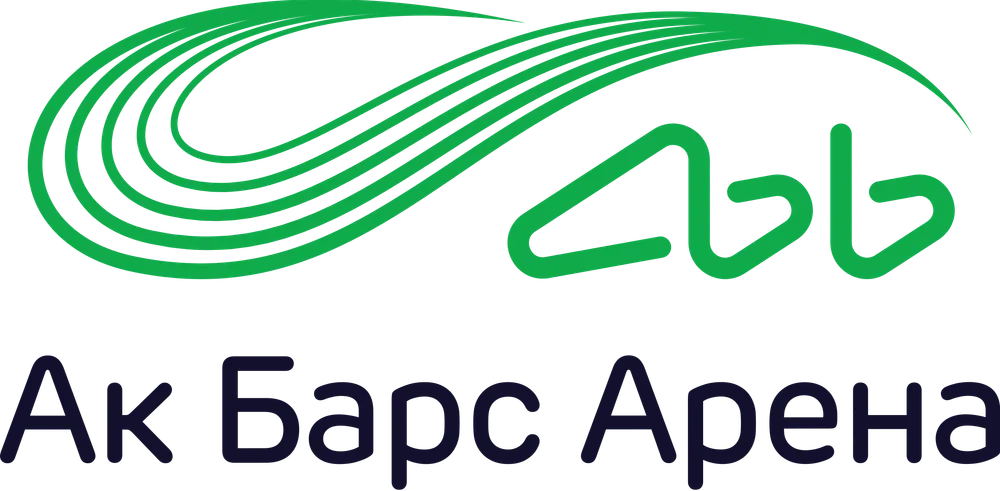

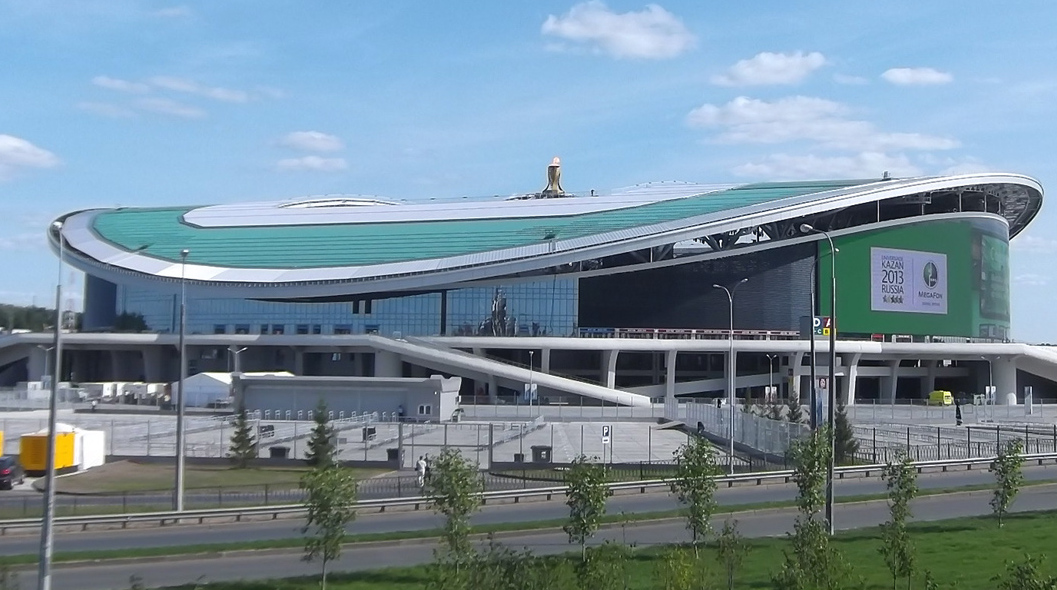
- UEFA
- Interactive map of Ak Bars Arena
- Former names: Kazan Arena (2013–2018)
- Address: Kazan; Russia
- Location: Prospekt Khusaina Yamasheva, 115 А, Kazan, Russia
- Coordinates: 55°49′16″N 49°09′39″E
- Owner: FC Rubin Kazan
- Operator: FC Rubin Kazan
- Capacity: 45,093 (Russian Premier League); 42,873 (2018 FIFA World Cup)
- Surface: GrassMaster
- Field size: 105 x 68 m

Construction
- Groundbreaking: 5 May 2010; 16 years ago
- Built: 2010–2013
- Opened: July 2013
- Cost: $ 450 million
- Architects: Populous, V. Motorin

Tenants
- FC Rubin Kazan (2013–present); Russia national football team (selected matches)

Ak Bars Arena (Russian: «Ак Барс Арена»; Tatar: Ак Барс Арена, formerly known as Kazan Arena (Russian: «Казань Арена»; Tatar: Казан Арена)) is a stadium in Kazan, Russia. It was completed in July 2013, and hosts football matches, especially FC Rubin Kazan's home games in the Russian Premier League. The stadium has the largest outside screen in the world. Its capacity is around 45,379.

== History ==
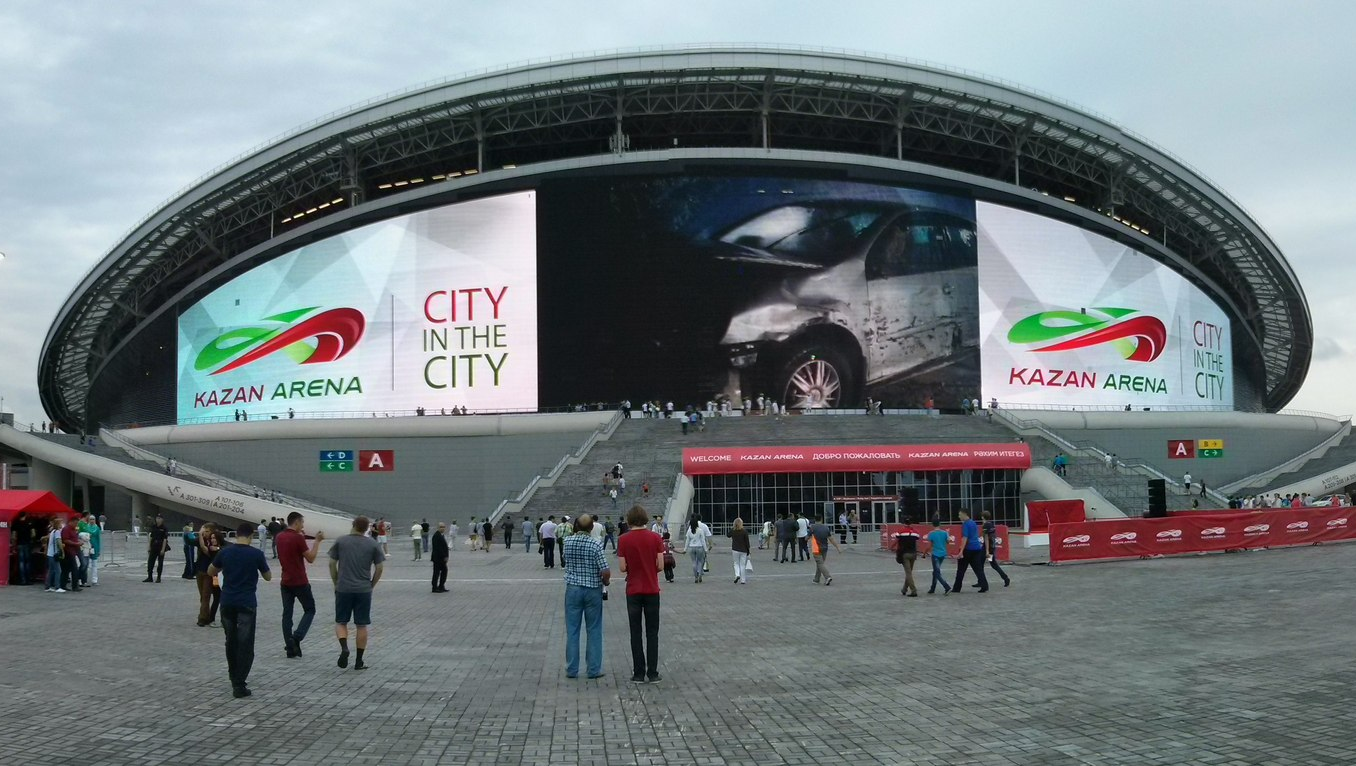
The stadium's LED facade is the largest one installed on a football stadium in the world.

The stadium was constructed for the 2013 Summer Universiade. On May 5, 2010, president Putin held the groundbreaking ceremony. The construction of the stadium was completed in 2013. The total cost was 15.5 billion rubles. The stadium hosted the 2013 Summer Universiade opening and closing ceremonies, and 2017 FIFA Confederations Cup. On August 17, 2014, the first football match of the Russian Championship was hosted in the Ak Bars Arena.

The 16th FINA World Championships were held in Kazan, with some events held at the Arena. It saw twelve swimming records.

In the 2018 FIFA World Cup, the stadium hosted six matches, including the ones where three past champions (Germany, Argentina, and Brazil) were eliminated from the tournament.

UEFA announced in March 2020 that the stadium would host the 2023 UEFA Super Cup; however, due to the Russian invasion of Ukraine, the venue was later moved to the Karaiskakis Stadium in Piraeus, Greece.

Moreover, this was supposed to be the location for the 2025 World Aquatics Championships, but it was later moved to Singapore.

== Design ==
The architectural concept has been designed by Populous; according to lead designer Damon Lavelle, the stadium is a unique response to the local culture and place. As a multiple-purpose venture, Ak Bars Arena can be used as football matches and other sporting events, cultural events concerts. With a capacity of 45,379 seats and 28 ha stadium territory, Ak Bars Arena is one of the UEFA's highest category stadium. The stadium has also 72 skyboxes and a fitness center. The general design stage: "TatInvestGrazhdanProekt", "Intex", "TsNIIpromzdany". It replaced Central Stadium as Kazan's main football stadium.

== 2017 FIFA Confederations Cup ==
Date	Time	Team #1	Result	Team #2	Round	Attendance
18 June 2017	18:00	Portugal	2–2	Mexico	Group A	34,372
22 June 2017	21:00	Germany	1–1	Chile	Group B	38,222
24 June 2017	18:00	Mexico	2–1	Russia	Group A	41,585
28 June 2017	21:00	Portugal	0–0 (0–3 pen.)	Chile	Semi-finals	40,855

== 2018 FIFA World Cup ==
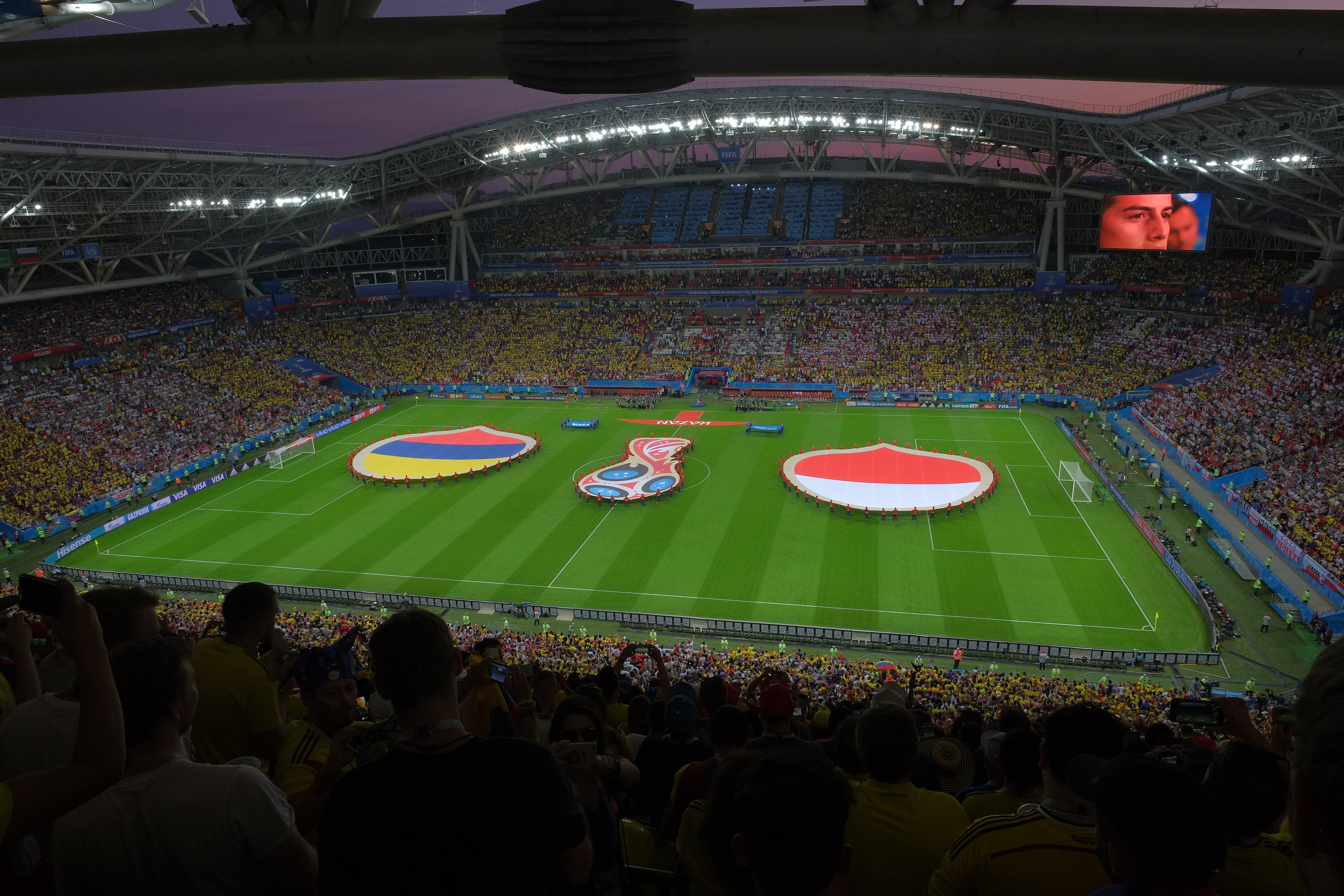
Poland vs Colombia match during 2018 FIFA World Cup

Date	Time	Team #1	Result	Team #2	Round	Attendance
16 June 2018	13:00	France	2–1	Australia	Group C	41,279
20 June 2018	21:00	Iran	0–1	Spain	Group B	42,718
24 June 2018	21:00	Poland	0–3	Colombia	Group H	42,873
27 June 2018	17:00	South Korea	2–0	Germany	Group F	41,835
30 June 2018	17:00	France	4–3	Argentina	Round of 16	42,873
6 July 2018	21:00	Brazil	1–2	Belgium	Quarter-finals	42,873

== Gallery ==
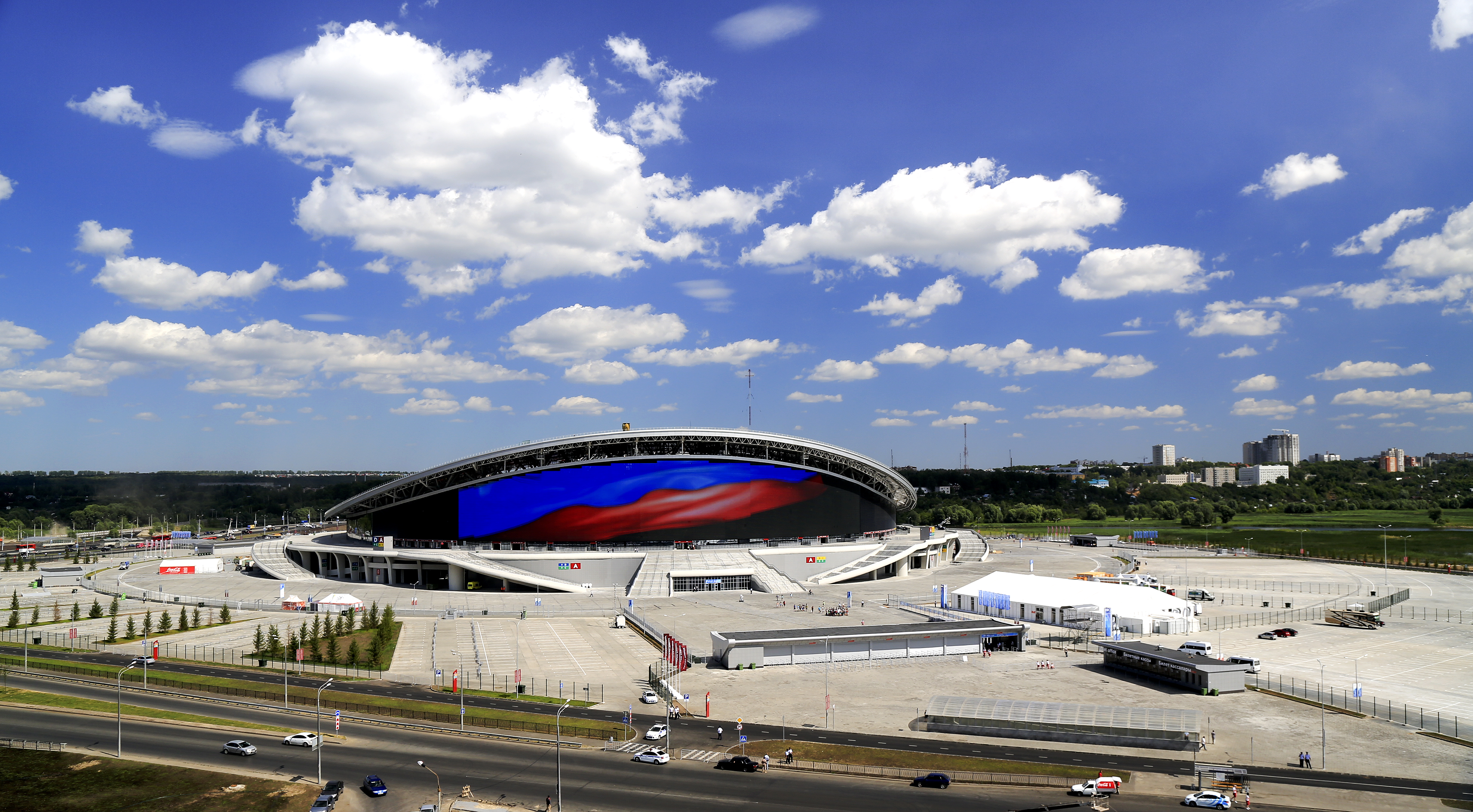
General view of the stadium

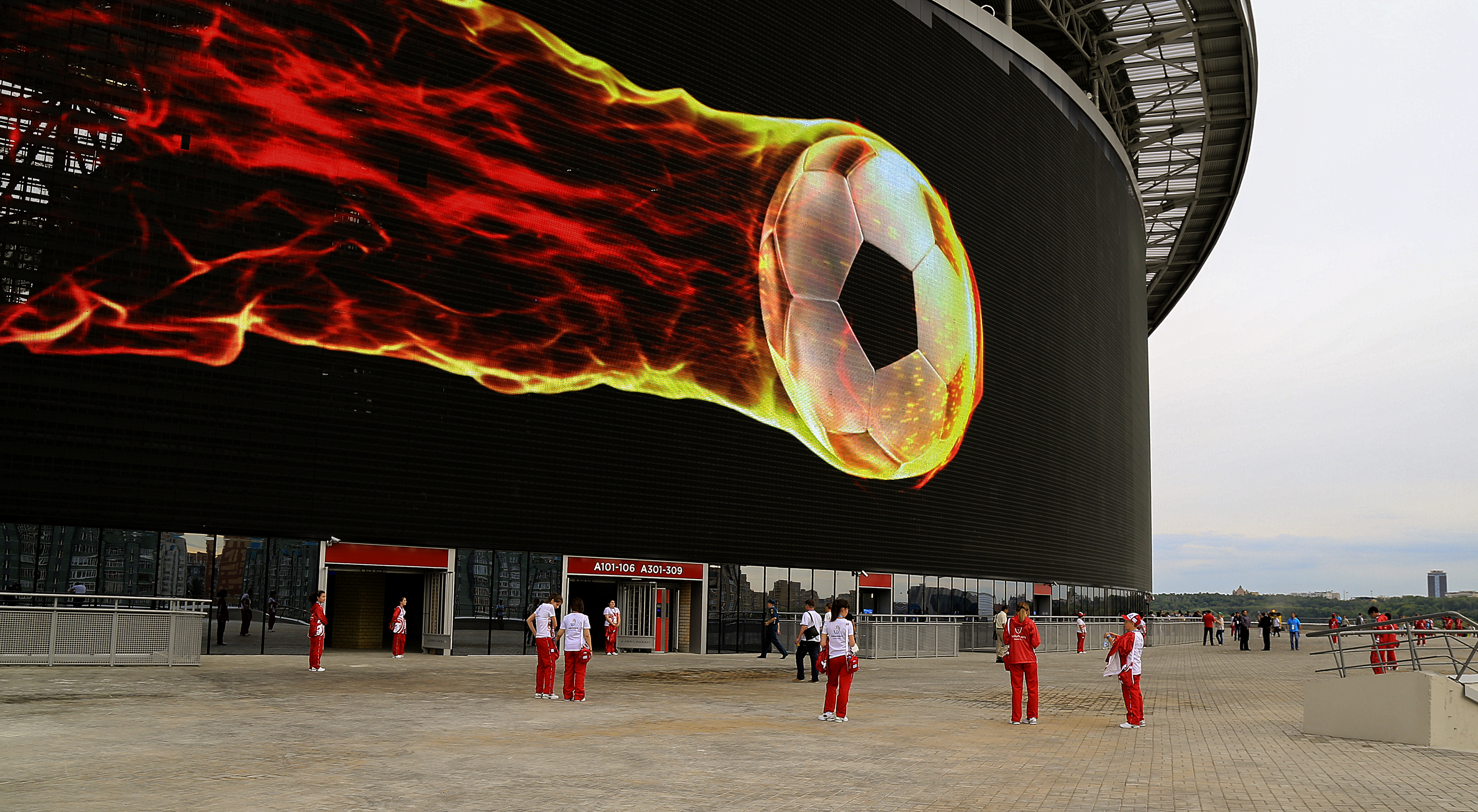
Media Facade

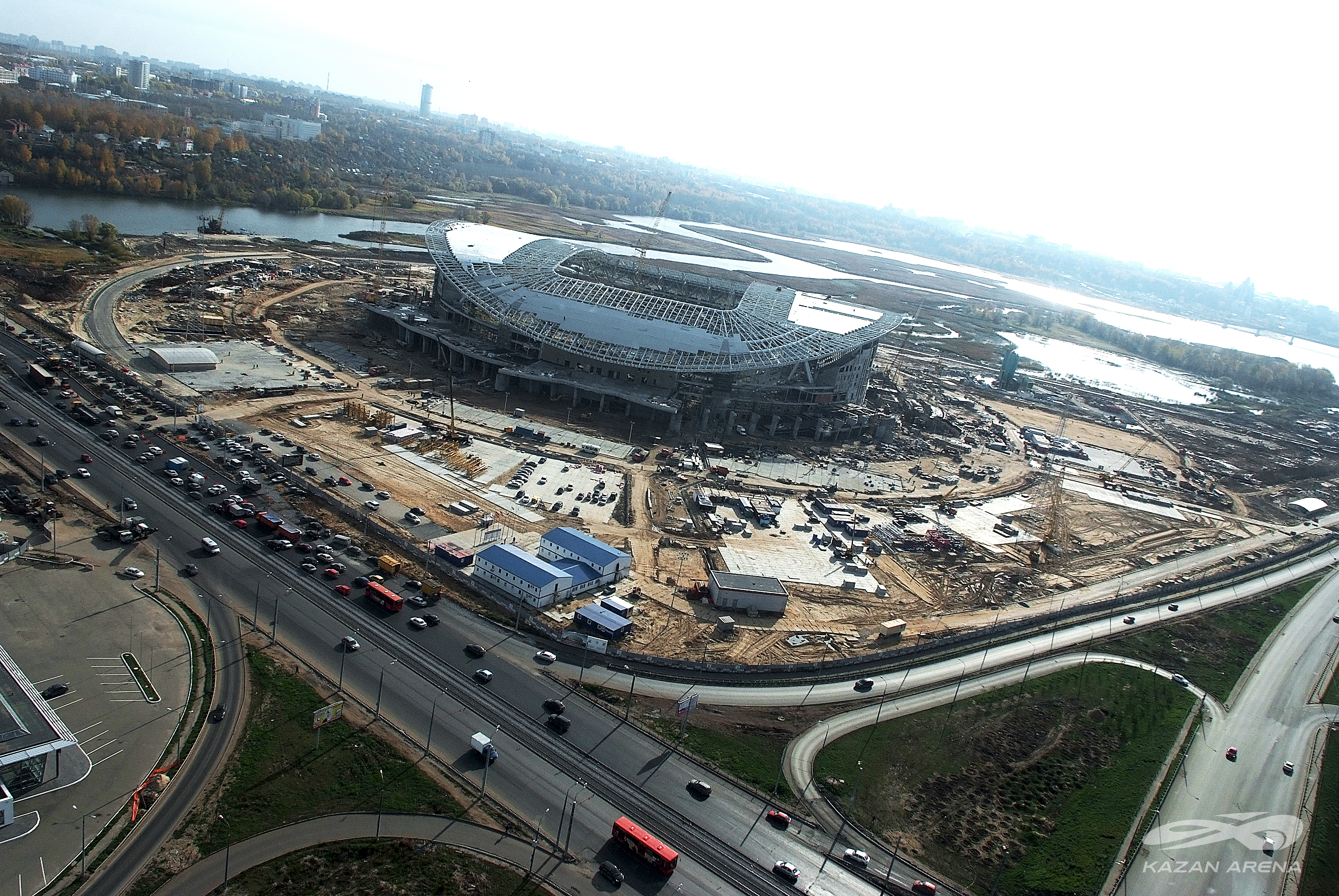
General view during construction

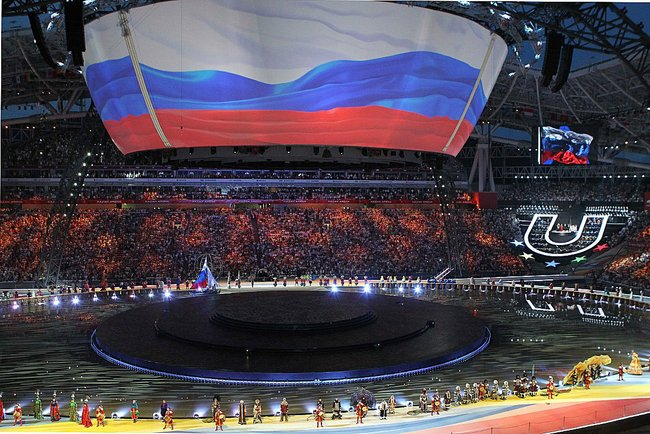
Stadium at the Universiade 2013 opening ceremony

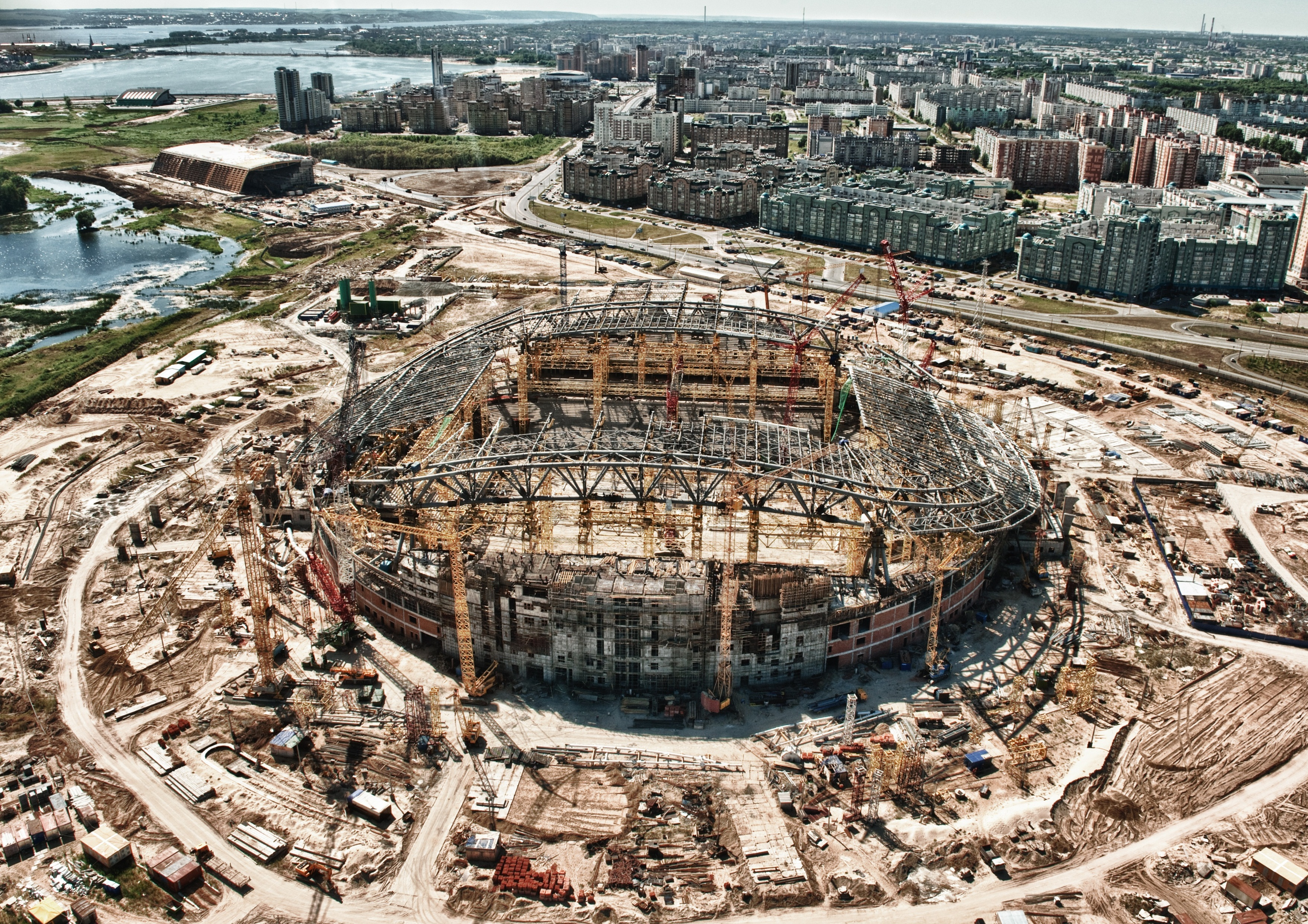
during construction

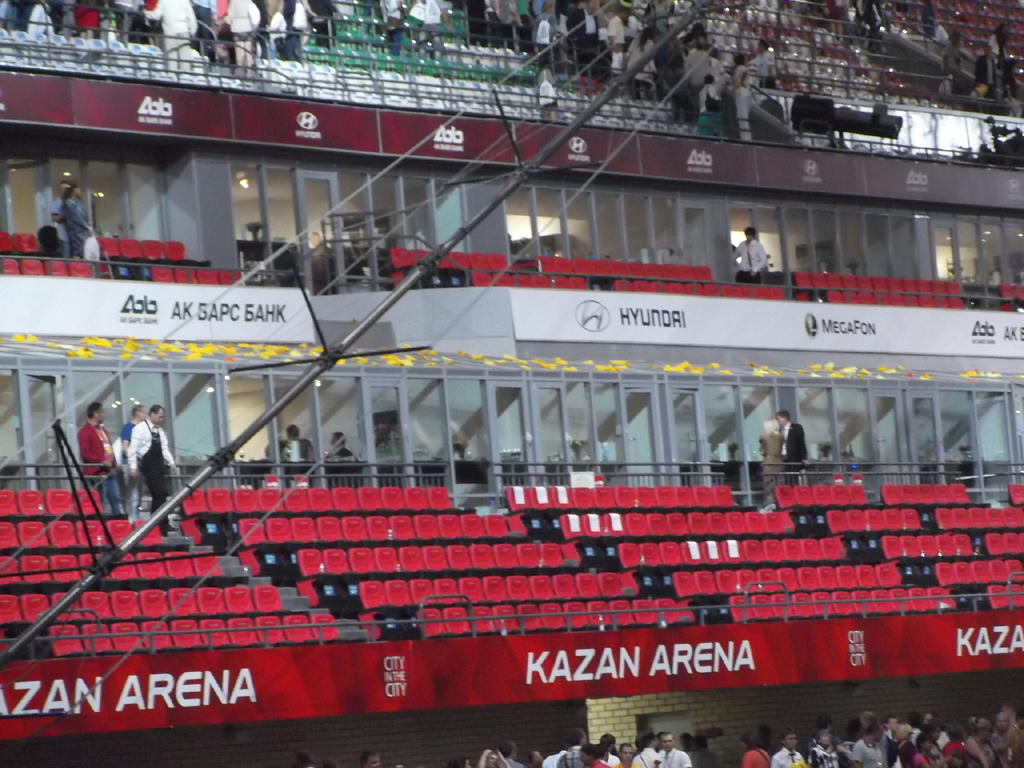

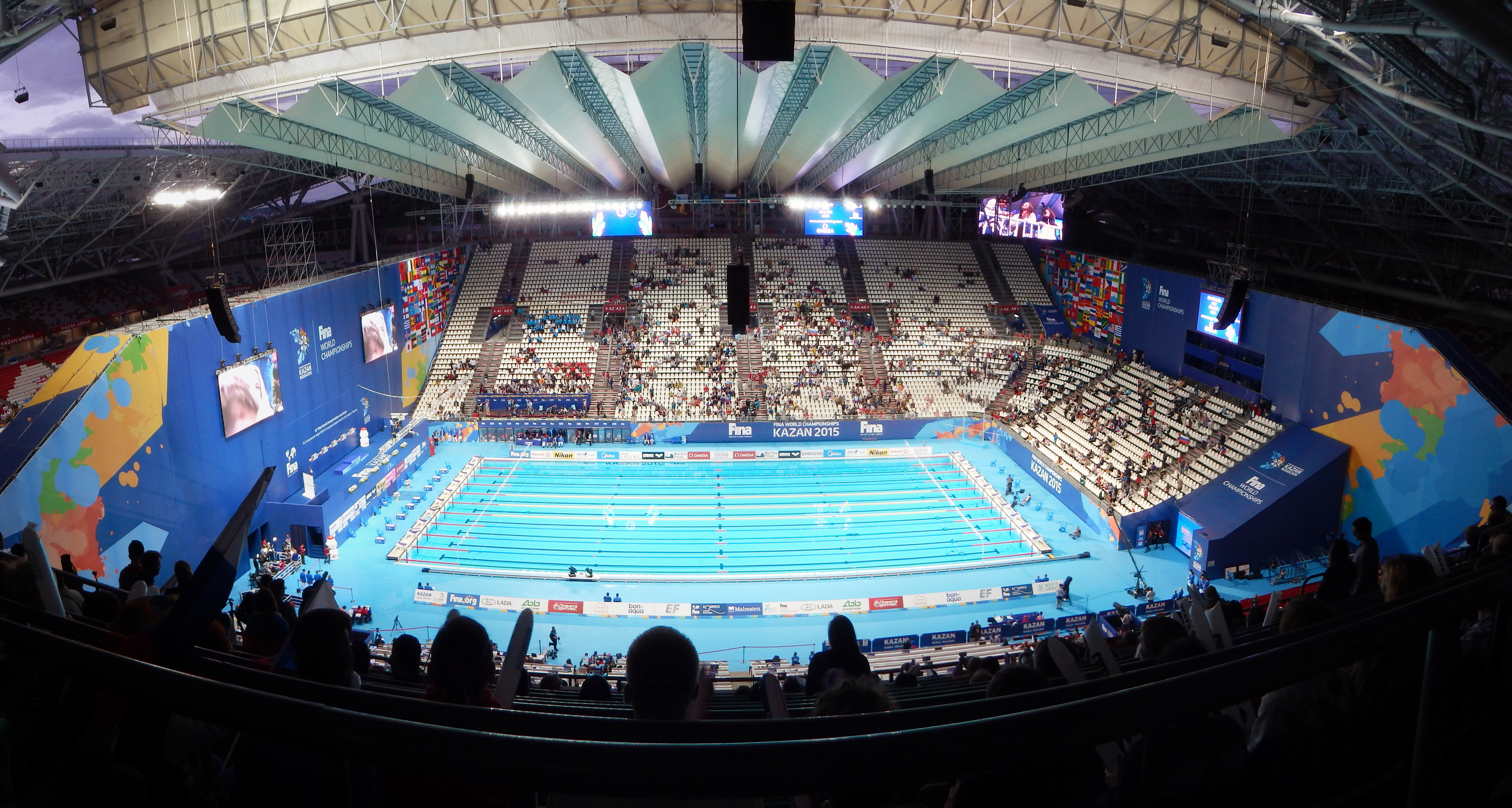
Pools at the arena during the World Water Sports Championship

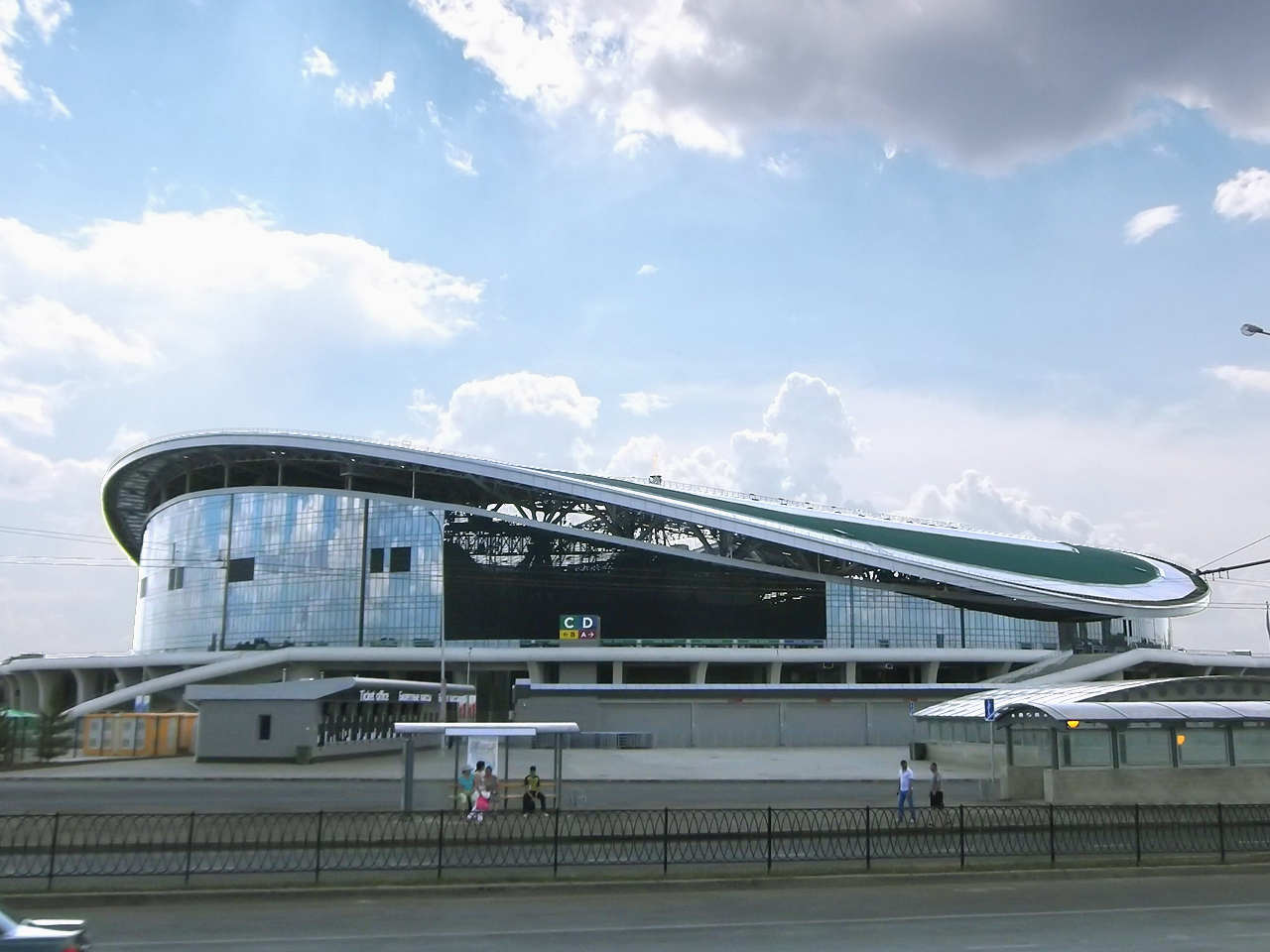
Kazan Arena in Kazan

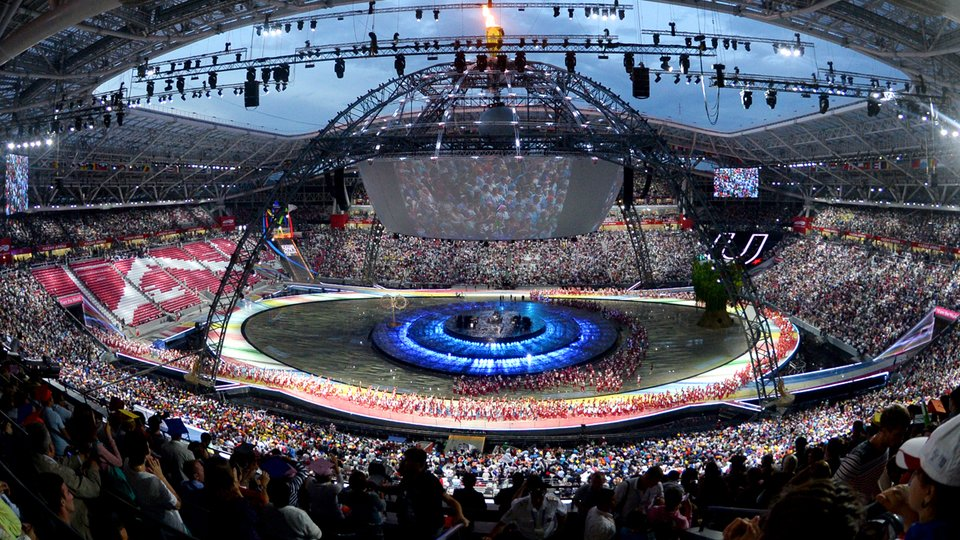

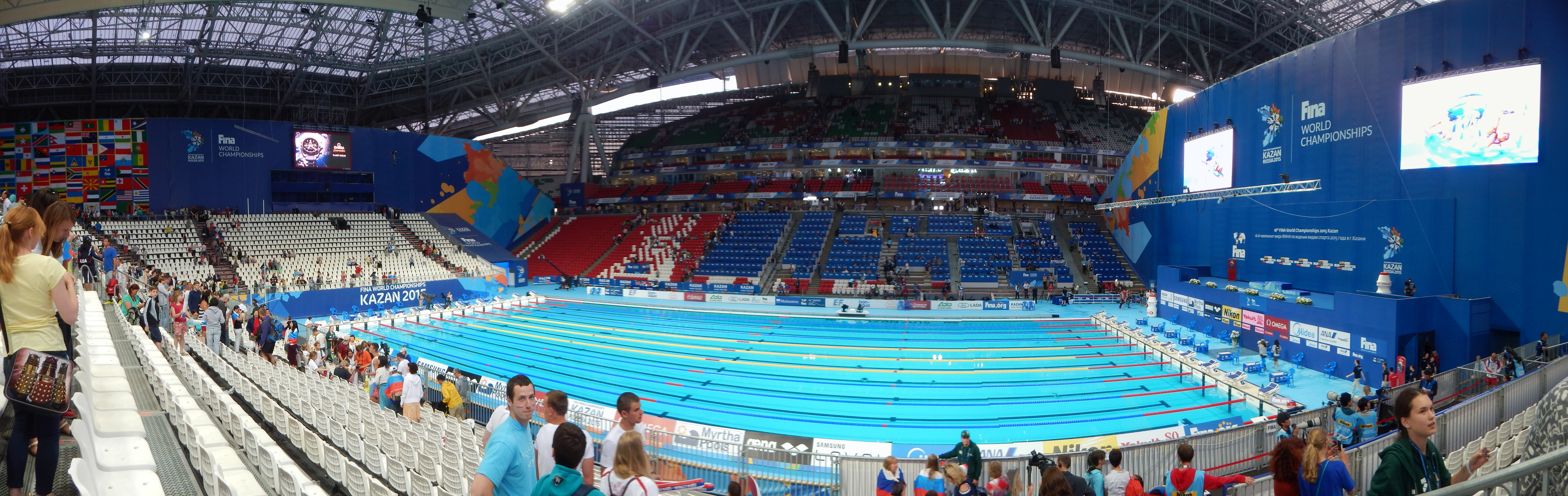
Panorama view of Kazan Arena during 2015 World Aquatics Championships

Preceded by Shenzhen Bay Sports Center and Window of the World; Shenzhen	Summer Universiade; Opening and Closing Ceremonies; 2013	Succeeded by Guus Hiddink Stadium; Gwangju
