= Rail Abdullin =

Russian footballer

Personal information
- Full name: Rail Raisovich Abdullin
- Date of birth: 6 August 2000 (age 26)
- Place of birth: Kazan, Russia
- Height: 1.73 m (5 ft 8 in)
- Position: Right-back

Senior career*
Years	Team	Apps	(Gls)
2018–2020	Rubin Kazan	1	(0)
2019–2020	→ Neftekhimik (loan)	5	(0)
2021–2022	Forte Taganrog	16	(0)
2023	Torpedo Vladimir	5	(0)
2023	Rubin-2 Kazan	10	(1)
2024–2025	Rubin-2 Kazan	26	(2)
2025–2026	Chelyabinsk	3	(0)
2026	Kuban Krasnodar	15	(0)

International career^{‡}
2016	Russia U-16	4	(0)
2016–2017	Russia U-17	5	(0)
2017	Russia U-18	3	(0)
2019	Russia U-19	1	(0)
2020	Russia U-20	2	(0)
- * Club domestic league appearances and goals as of 14 June 2026 ‡ National team caps and goals as of 23 February 2020

Rail Raisovich Abdullin (Russian: Раиль Раисович Абдуллин; born 6 August 2000) is a Russian football player.

== Club career ==
He made his debut in the Russian Premier League for Rubin Kazan on 9 December 2018 in a game against Zenit St. Petersburg, as a starter.

On 19 July 2019 he joined Neftekhimik Nizhnekamsk on loan.
