= 2017–18 FC Zenit Saint Petersburg season =

FC Zenit Saint Petersburg
2017–18 season
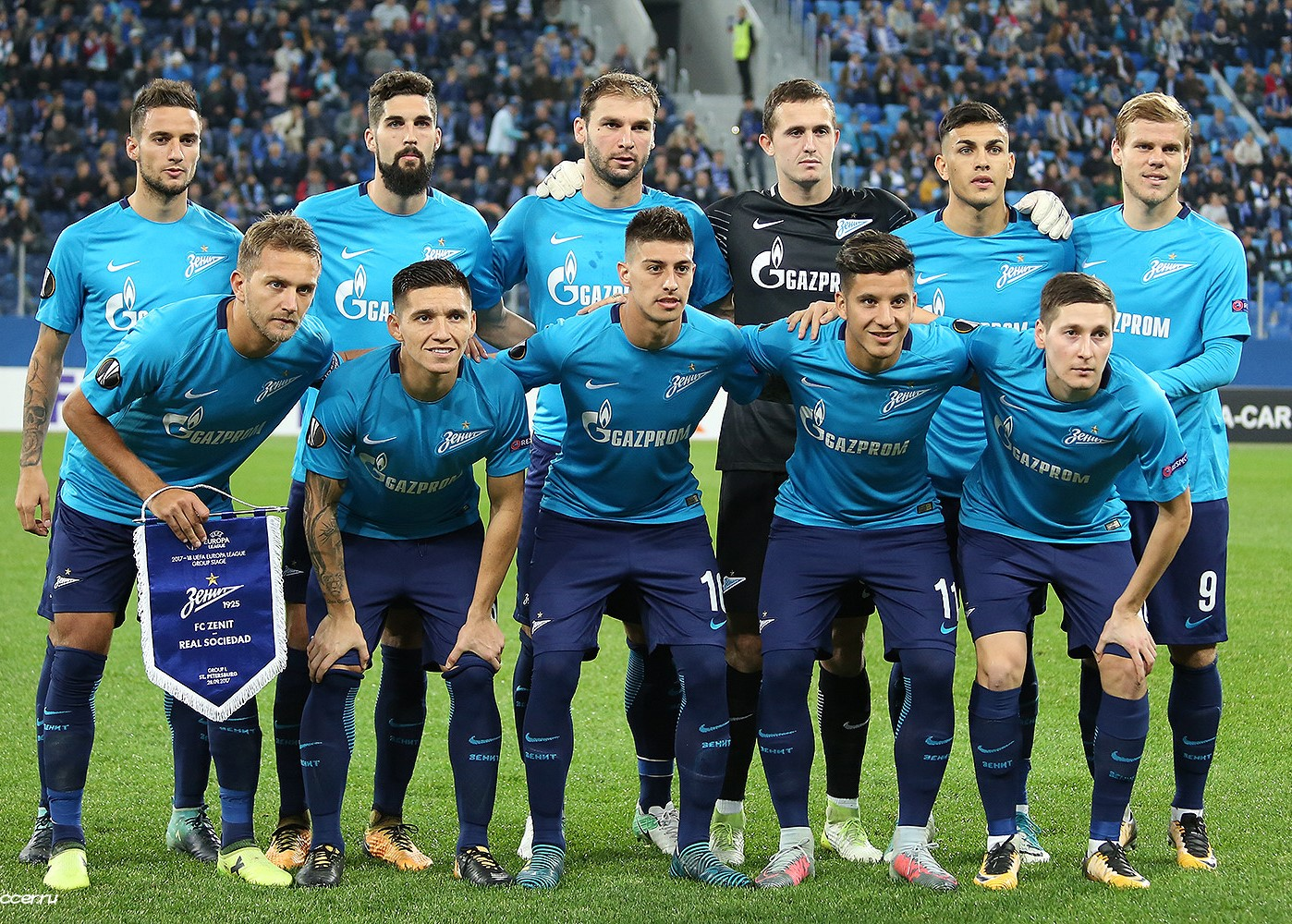
- Chairman: Aleksandr Dyukov
- Manager: Roberto Mancini
- Stadium: Krestovsky Stadium
- Russian Premier League: 5th
- Russian Cup: Round of 32
- Europa League: Round of 16
- Top goalscorer: League: Aleksandr Kokorin (10); All: Aleksandr Kokorin (16)
Home colours	Away colours	Third colours

The 2017–18 Zenit Saint Petersburg season was the 93rd season in the club's history and its 22nd consecutive season in the Russian Premier League.

== Season events ==
Prior to the start of the season, 1 June 2017, Roberto Mancini replaced Mircea Lucescu as manager of Zenit.

== Squad ==
As of 18 February 2018

Note: Flags indicate national team as defined under FIFA eligibility rules; some limited exceptions apply. Players may hold more than one non-FIFA nationality.

No.	Pos.	Nation	Player
1	GK	RUS	Yuri Lodygin
2	DF	RUS	Aleksandr Anyukov
3	DF	RUS	Denis Terentyev
4	DF	ITA	Domenico Criscito
5	MF	ARG	Leandro Paredes
7	FW	RUS	Dmitry Poloz
8	MF	ARG	Matías Kranevitter
9	FW	RUS	Aleksandr Kokorin
10	MF	ARG	Emiliano Rigoni
11	FW	ARG	Sebastián Driussi
14	MF	RUS	Daler Kuzyayev
15	DF	RUS	Elmir Nabiullin
18	MF	RUS	Yuriy Zhirkov
19	DF	RUS	Igor Smolnikov

No.	Pos.	Nation	Player
20	MF	RUS	Viktor Fayzulin
21	MF	RUS	Aleksandr Yerokhin
23	DF	SLO	Miha Mevlja
27	MF	RUS	Magomed Ozdoyev
29	FW	RUS	Anton Zabolotny
30	DF	ARG	Emanuel Mammana
33	FW	RUS	Andrei Panyukov
41	GK	RUS	Mikhail Kerzhakov
55	MF	BLR	Kirill Kaplenko
60	DF	SRB	Branislav Ivanović
71	GK	RUS	Yegor Baburin
80	DF	RUS	Ilya Skrobotov
99	GK	RUS	Andrey Lunyov
—	MF	RUS	Vyacheslav Zinkov (on loan from Krylia Sovetov)

=== Out on loan ===
Note: Flags indicate national team as defined under FIFA eligibility rules; some limited exceptions apply. Players may hold more than one non-FIFA nationality.

No.	Pos.	Nation	Player
5	MF	RUS	Aleksandr Ryazantsev (at Amkar Perm)
13	DF	POR	Luís Neto (at Fenerbahçe)
15	DF	RUS	Ibragim Tsallagov (at Dynamo Moscow)
16	MF	ECU	Christian Noboa (at Rubin Kazan)
17	MF	RUS	Oleg Shatov (at Krasnodar)
22	FW	RUS	Artem Dzyuba (at Arsenal Tula)
23	DF	RUS	Yevgeni Chernov (at Tosno)
25	DF	RUS	Ivan Novoseltsev (at Arsenal Tula)
27	DF	RUS	Sergei Zuykov (at Tom Tomsk)

No.	Pos.	Nation	Player
29	MF	SVK	Róbert Mak (at PAOK)
46	MF	RUS	Vitali Gorulyov (at Volgar Astrakhan)
77	FW	MNE	Luka Đorđević (at Arsenal Tula)
87	DF	RUS	Artyom Vyatkin (at Lahti)
88	MF	RUS	Dmitri Bogayev (at SKA-Khabarovsk)
—	GK	RUS	Igor Obukhov (at Arsenal Tula)
—	MF	BRA	Hernani (at Saint-Étienne)
—	MF	RUS	Aleksei Isayev (at Yenisey Krasnoyarsk)
—	MF	RUS	Artur Yusupov (at Rostov)

== Transfers ==
=== Summer ===
In: Note: Flags indicate national team as defined under FIFA eligibility rules; some limited exceptions apply. Players may hold more than one non-FIFA nationality.

No.	Pos.	Nation	Player
3	DF	RUS	Denis Terentyev (from (Russia) Rostov)
5	MF	ARG	Leandro Paredes (from (Italy) Roma)
7	FW	RUS	Dmitry Poloz (from (Russia) Rostov)
8	MF	ARG	Matías Kranevitter (from (Spain) Atlético Madrid)
10	MF	ARG	Emiliano Rigoni (from (Argentina) Independiente)
11	FW	ARG	Sebastián Driussi (from (Argentina) River Plate)
14	MF	RUS	Daler Kuzyayev (from (Russia) Akhmat Grozny)
16	MF	ECU	Christian Noboa (from (Russia) Rostov)
21	MF	RUS	Aleksandr Yerokhin (from (Russia) Rostov)
23	DF	SLO	Miha Mevlja (from (Russia) Rostov)
30	DF	ARG	Emanuel Mammana (from (France) Lyon)
31	GK	RUS	Mikhail Ponomarenko
32	FW	RUS	Nikolai Prudnikov (from (Russia) Chertanovo Moscow)
33	FW	RUS	Andrei Panyukov (from (Lithuania) Atlantas)
41	GK	RUS	Mikhail Kerzhakov (end of loan to (Russia) Orenburg)
52	DF	RUS	Andrei Anisimov
55	MF	BLR	Kirill Kaplenko (from own academy)
63	DF	RUS	Maksim Smirnov
65	FW	RUS	Maksim Bachinsky
67	MF	RUS	Nikita Andreyev (end of loan to (Slovakia) VSS Košice)
72	DF	RUS	Anton Sinyak
74	MF	RUS	Sergei Ivanov (end of loan to (Slovakia) VSS Košice)
75	MF	RUS	Ivan Andreyev
80	DF	RUS	Ilya Skrobotov (from own academy)
81	MF	LAT	Vladislavs Soloveičiks (from (Latvia) RTU)
82	FW	RUS	Ivan Tarasov (from own academy)
84	FW	RUS	Ilya Vorobyov
88	FW	RUS	Dmitri Bogayev (from (Lithuania) Palanga)
90	FW	RUS	Yefrem Vartanyan
90	DF	RUS	Stanislav Utkin
94	FW	RUS	Nikita Povarov
96	DF	RUS	Tomas Rukas (from (Portugal) União de Leiria)
—	GK	RUS	Igor Obukhov (end of loan to (Russia) Tyumen)

Out: Note: Flags indicate national team as defined under FIFA eligibility rules; some limited exceptions apply. Players may hold more than one non-FIFA nationality.

No.	Pos.	Nation	Player
5	MF	RUS	Aleksandr Ryazantsev (on loan to (Russia) Amkar Perm)
6	DF	BEL	Nicolas Lombaerts (to (Belgium) Oostende)
6	MF	ESP	Javi García (to (Spain) Real Betis)
8	MF	BRA	Maurício (to (Greece) PAOK)
10	MF	POR	Danny (to (Czech Republic) Slavia Prague)
10	MF	BRA	Giuliano (to (Turkey) Fenerbahçe)
11	FW	RUS	Aleksandr Kerzhakov (retired)
13	DF	POR	Luís Neto (loan to (Turkey) Fenerbahçe)
14	MF	RUS	Artur Yusupov (on loan to (Russia) Rostov)
15	DF	RUS	Ibragim Tsallagov (on loan to (Russia) Dynamo Moscow)
23	DF	RUS	Yevgeni Chernov (on loan to (Russia) Tosno)
23	MF	BRA	Hernani (on loan to (France) Saint-Étienne)
24	MF	FRA	Yohan Mollo (to (England) Fulham)
25	MF	RUS	Aleksei Isayev (on loan to (Russia) Yenisey Krasnoyarsk)
26	DF	SRB	Vukašin Jovanović (to (France) Bordeaux, previously on loan)
27	DF	RUS	Sergei Zuykov (on loan to (Russia) Tom Tomsk)
29	MF	SVK	Róbert Mak (on loan to (Greece) PAOK)
32	DF	RUS	David Mildzikhov (to (Russia) Yenisey Krasnoyarsk)
34	FW	RUS	Maximilian Pronichev
39	FW	RUS	Vasili Zapryagayev
40	MF	RUS	Yuri Bavin (to (Russia) Ural Yekaterinburg)
42	MF	RUS	Konstantin Kotov
45	DF	RUS	Kirill Kostin (to (Russia) Dynamo St. Petersburg)
49	MF	RUS	Dmitri Pletnyov
52	GK	RUS	Nodari Kalichava (to (Russia) Lokomotiv Saint Petersburg)
55	MF	RUS	Konstantin Lobov (retired)
65	MF	RUS	Danila Yashchuk (to (Russia) Kuban Krasnodar)
72	DF	RUS	Stanislav Mareyev (to (Russia) Irtysh Omsk)
75	DF	RUS	Temur Mustafin (to (Russia) Fakel Voronezh)
77	FW	MNE	Luka Đorđević (loan to (Russia) Arsenal Tula)
80	GK	RUS	Mikhail Mzhelsky (to (Russia) Anzhi-Yunior Zelenodolsk)
84	DF	RUS	Feliks Shalimov (to (Russia) Dynamo-2 St. Petersburg)
85	FW	RUS	Yuri Kozlov
87	DF	RUS	Artyom Vyatkin (on loan to (Croatia) Novigrad)
88	FW	RUS	Beni Yunayev
90	FW	RUS	Yefrem Vartanyan (to (Russia) Dynamo St. Petersburg)
94	MF	RUS	Alexey Yevseyev (to (Russia) Ural Yekaterinburg)
98	FW	RUS	Kirill Pogrebnyak (to (Russia) Baltika Kaliningrad)
—	DF	RUS	Andrei Ivanov (to (Russia) Tom Tomsk, previously on loan to (Russia) Mordovia Saransk)

=== Winter ===
In: Note: Flags indicate national team as defined under FIFA eligibility rules; some limited exceptions apply. Players may hold more than one non-FIFA nationality.

No.	Pos.	Nation	Player
15	DF	RUS	Elmir Nabiullin (from (Russia) Rubin Kazan)
27	MF	RUS	Magomed Ozdoyev (from (Russia) Rubin Kazan)
29	FW	RUS	Anton Zabolotny (from (Russia) Tosno)
40	DF	RUS	Ilya Vakhaniya
45	MF	RUS	Dmitri Sergeyev
48	GK	RUS	Nodari Kalichava (from (Russia) Lokomotiv Saint Petersburg)
50	DF	RUS	Vladislav Molchan
51	FW	RUS	Artyom Dyakonov
69	MF	RUS	Nikita Miroshnichenko
83	DF	RUS	Aleksandr Korotkov
87	DF	RUS	Danila Prokhin
88	MF	RUS	Vyacheslav Zinkov (on loan from (Russia) Krylia Sovetov Samara)
90	FW	RUS	Ilya Grishchenko
95	GK	RUS	Aleksandr Vasyutin (end of loan to (Finland) Lahti)

Out: Note: Flags indicate national team as defined under FIFA eligibility rules; some limited exceptions apply. Players may hold more than one non-FIFA nationality.

No.	Pos.	Nation	Player
16	MF	ECU	Christian Noboa (loan to (Russia) Rubin Kazan)
17	MF	RUS	Oleg Shatov (loan to (Russia) Krasnodar)
22	FW	RUS	Artem Dzyuba (loan to (Russia) Arsenal Tula)
25	DF	RUS	Ivan Novoseltsev (loan to (Russia) Arsenal Tula)
40	MF	RUS	Konstantin Zyryanov (retired)
46	MF	RUS	Vitali Gorulyov (on loan to (Russia) Volgar Astrakhan)
50	DF	RUS	Maksim Karpov (on loan to (Russia) SKA-Khabarovsk)
51	GK	RUS	Maksim Rudakov (on loan to (Finland) HJK)
53	DF	RUS	Kirill Aloyan
67	MF	RUS	Nikita Andreyev (to (Russia) Anzhi Makhachkala)
88	MF	RUS	Dmitri Bogayev (on loan to (Russia) SKA-Khabarovsk)
90	DF	RUS	Stanislav Utkin (to (Russia) Lokomotiv Moscow)
—	GK	RUS	Igor Obukhov (on loan to (Russia) Arsenal Tula, previously on loan to (Russia) Tyumen)
—	DF	RUS	Artyom Vyatkin (on loan to (Finland) Lahti, previously on loan to (Croatia) Novigrad)

== Competitions ==
=== Russian Premier League ===
==== Results by round ====
Round	1	2	3	4	5	6	7	8	9	10	11	12	13	14	15	16	17	18	19	20	21	22	23	24	25	26	27	28	29	30
Ground	A	H	A	H	A	H	A	H	A	H	A	A	H	A	H	A	H	A	H	A	H	A	A	H	H	H	A	H	A	H
Result	W	W	W	W	D	W	W	D	D	W	W	D	L	D	L	D	W	L	W	D	D	D	W	L	W	W	D	D	L	W
Position	2	3	2	1	1	1	1	1	1	1	1	1	1	1	2	2	2	2	2	2	4	5	4	5	5	4	4	4	5	5

Updated to match(es) played on 13 May 2017. Source: See Results
A = Away; H = Home; W = Win; D = Draw; L = Loss

==== Results ====
16 July 2017 1	SKA-Khabarovsk	0–2	Zenit St.Petersburg	Khabarovsk
11:00 MSK (UTC+3)	Kazankov (yellow card) 42'	Report	Yerokhin (yellow card) 30'; Smolnikov (yellow card) 40'; Kuzyayev 52' (yellow card) 85'; Kokorin (yellow card) 67' (goal) 81'	Stadium: Lenin Stadium; Attendance: 14,200; Referee: Roman Galimov

22 July 2017 2	Zenit St.Petersburg	2–1	Rubin Kazan	Saint Petersburg
17:30 MSK (UTC+3)	Driussi 51', 90+1'	Report	Nabiullin (yellow card) 14'; Zhemaletdinov 45+1'; Karadeniz (yellow card) 73'	Stadium: Krestovsky Stadium; Attendance: 38,284; Referee: Vladimir Seldyakov

30 July 2017 3	Tosno	0–1	Zenit St.Petersburg	Saint Petersburg
20:00 MSK (UTC+3)	Chernov (yellow card) 19'; Galiulin (yellow card) 55'; Rocha (yellow card) 87'	Report	Kokorin 10'; Yerokhin (yellow card) 45+1'	Stadium: Petrovsky Stadium; Attendance: 12,555; Referee: Aleksey Sukhoy

6 August 2017 4	Zenit St.Petersburg	5–1	Spartak Moscow	Saint Petersburg
20:00 MSK (UTC+3)	Kokorin 36'; Paredes (yellow card) 40'; Yerokhin 45'; Criscito 57' Kuzyayev 63'; Rebrov 77' (o.g.); Smolnikov (red card) 90+2'; Terentyev (yellow card) 90+3'	Report	Dzhikiya (yellow card) 27'; Glushakov (yellow card) 34'; Kombarov (yellow card) 45+1'; Promes 71' (pen.); Fernando (yellow card) 89'; Adriano (red card) 90+2'	Stadium: Krestovsky Stadium; Attendance: 53,359; Referee: Mikhail Vilkov

9 August 2017 5	Ural Yekaterinburg	1–1	Zenit St.Petersburg	Yekaterinburg
17:30 MSK (UTC+3)	Bicfalvi 35'; Ilyin (yellow card) 77'	Report	Kokorin 60'; Neto (yellow card) 77'	Stadium: SKB-Bank Arena; Attendance: 8,965; Referee: Roman Galimov

13 August 2017 6	Zenit St.Petersburg	4–0	Akhmat Grozny	Saint Petersburg
20:00 MSK (UTC+3)	Criscito (yellow card) 26'; Paredes 28'; Kokorin 50'; Kuzyayev 68'; Zhirkov 84'	Report	Akhyadov (yellow card) 21'; Ángel (yellow card) 25'; Utsiyev (yellow card) 26' (yellow-red card) 29'; Ivanov (yellow card) 50'; Roshi (yellow card) 75'	Stadium: Krestovsky Stadium; Attendance: 45,470; Referee: Igor Fedotov

20 August 2017 7	Amkar Perm	0–1	Zenit St.Petersburg	Perm
15:00 MSK (UTC+3)	Idowu (yellow card) 63'	Report	Kokorin 61'; Kranevitter (yellow card) 84'; Lunyov (yellow card) 90+1'	Stadium: Zvezda Stadium; Attendance: 11,345; Referee: Aleksei Matyunin

27 August 2017 8	Zenit St.Petersburg	0–0	Rostov	Saint Petersburg
20:00 MSK (UTC+3)	Poloz (yellow card) 78'	Report		Stadium: Krestovsky Stadium; Attendance: 50,404; Referee: Vladimir Seldyakov

10 September 2017 9	Dynamo Moscow	0–0	Zenit St.Petersburg	Khimki
14:00 MSK (UTC+3)	Sow (yellow card) 45+2'; Temnikov (yellow card) 66'; Wánderson (yellow card) 84'	Report	Yerokhin (yellow card) 70'	Stadium: Arena Khimki; Attendance: 11,518; Referee: Aleksey Sukhoy

18 September 2017 10	Zenit St.Petersburg	3–0	Ufa	Saint Petersburg
20:00 MSK (UTC+3)	Driussi 9'; Criscito 22' (pen.); Kokorin 77'	Report	Paurević (yellow card) 83'; Sly (yellow card) 90+1'	Stadium: Krestovsky Stadium; Attendance: 30,158; Referee: Roman Galimov

24 September 2017 11	Krasnodar	0–2	Zenit St.Petersburg	Krasnodar
19:00 MSK (UTC+3)	Pereyra (yellow card) 45+2'	Report	Yerokhin 30'; Poloz 36'; Kranevitter (yellow card) 63'	Stadium: Krasnodar Stadium; Attendance: 33,979; Referee: Mikhail Vilkov

1 October 2017 12	Anzhi Makhachkala	2–2	Zenit St.Petersburg	Kaspiysk
19:00 MSK (UTC+3)	Phibel (yellow card) 13'; Danchenko 20' (yellow card) 81'; Markelov (yellow card) 23'; Katsayev 59'	Report	Kranevitter (yellow card) 36'; Kokorin 57'; Paredes 85' (yellow card) 90+4'; Rigoni (yellow card) 90+3'	Stadium: Anzhi Arena; Attendance: 5,150; Referee: Aleksei Matyunin

15 October 2017 13	Zenit St.Petersburg	0–1	Arsenal Tula	Saint Petersburg
19:00 MSK (UTC+3)	Paredes (yellow card) 77'	Report	Čaušić (yellow card) 37'; Sunzu (yellow card) 53'; Kangwa 73'; Gabulov (yellow card) 90+3'	Stadium: Krestovsky Stadium; Attendance: 45,746; Referee: Artem Chistyakov

22 October 2017 14	CSKA Moscow	0–0	Zenit St.Petersburg	Moscow
16:30 MSK (UTC+3)	Vasin (yellow card) 5'; Akinfeev (yellow card) 11'; Fernandes (yellow card) 12'; A.Berezutski (yellow card) 30'; Wernbloom (yellow card) 65'; Natkho (yellow card) 66'	Report	Mevlja (yellow card) 32'; Rigoni (yellow card) 43'; Dzyuba (yellow card) 66'; Paredes (yellow card) 66'	Stadium: VEB Arena; Attendance: 26,137; Referee: Mikhail Vilkov

29 October 2017 15	Zenit St.Petersburg	0 – 3	Lokomotiv Moscow	Saint Petersburg
16:30 MSK (UTC+3)	Criscito (yellow card) 59'	Report	Farfán 58', 69'; Guilherme (yellow card) 72'; Al.Miranchuk 77'	Stadium: Krestovsky Stadium; Attendance: 45,829; Referee: Vitaly Meshkov

5 November 2017 16	Rubin Kazan	0 – 0	Zenit St.Petersburg	Kazan
19:00 MSK (UTC+3)	Granat (yellow card) 24'; Bauer (yellow card) 54'; M'Vila (yellow card) 61'; Azmoun (yellow card) 90+5'	Report	Paredes (yellow card) 72'; Smolnikov (yellow card) 90+5'	Stadium: Kazan Arena; Attendance: 11,007; Referee: Roman Galimov

19 November 2017 17	Zenit St.Petersburg	5 – 0	Tosno	Saint Petersburg
19:00 MSK (UTC+3)	Smolnikov (yellow card) 1'; Paredes 20' (pen.); Kuzyayev 52'; Ivanović 64'; Kokorin 70'; Dzyuba 86'	Report	Rocha (yellow card) 39'; Zabolotny (yellow card) 88'	Stadium: Krestovsky Stadium; Attendance: 48,031; Referee: Aleksey Eskov

27 November 2017 18	Spartak Moscow	3 – 1	Zenit St.Petersburg	Moscow
19:30 MSK (UTC+3)	Samedov 19' (yellow card) 24'; Luiz Adriano 30'; Glushakov (yellow card) 45'; Zobnin (yellow card) 68'; Fernando (yellow card) 79' (yellow-red card) 85'; Zé Luís (yellow card) 82'; Bocchetti (yellow card) 90+7'; Pašalić 90+8'	Report	Paredes (yellow card) 24'; Criscito 35'; Rigoni (yellow card) 81'	Stadium: Otkrytiye Arena; Attendance: 41,141; Referee: Vitaly Meshkov

2 December 2017 19	Zenit St.Petersburg	2 – 1	Ural Yekaterinburg	Saint Petersburg
14:00 MSK (UTC+3)	Portnyagin 31' (o.g.); Criscito (yellow card) 45+1'; Yerokhin (yellow card) 53'; Kokorin 76' (yellow card) 76'	Report	Mammana 6' (o.g.); Bavin (yellow card) 68'; Yemelyanov (yellow card) 69'; Ilyin (yellow card) 75'; Merkulov (yellow card) 80'	Stadium: Krestovsky Stadium; Attendance: 43,921; Referee: Sergey Karasev

11 December 2017 20	Akhmat Grozny	0 – 0	Zenit St.Petersburg	Grozny
19:30 MSK (UTC+3)	Ivanov (yellow card) 26'; Philipe Sampaio (yellow card) 73'	Report	Zhirkov (yellow card) 27'; Paredes (yellow card) 73'	Stadium: Akhmat-Arena; Attendance: 15,532; Referee: Vladimir Seldyakov

3 March 2017 21	Zenit St.Petersburg	0 – 0	Amkar Perm	Saint Petersburg
16:30 MSK (UTC+3)	Yerokhin (yellow card) 7' (yellow-red card) 67'; Zabolotny (yellow card) 71'; Criscito (yellow card) 78' (yellow-red card) 90+4'; Paredes (yellow card) 90+3'	Report	Zaytsev (yellow card) 22' (yellow-red card) 90+7'; Gashchenkov (yellow card) 26'; Ezatolahi (yellow card) 82'; Nigmatullin (yellow card) 90+1'	Stadium: Krestovsky Stadium; Attendance: 41,543; Referee: Vladimir Seldyakov

11 March 2018 22	Rostov	0 – 0	Zenit St.Petersburg	Rostov-on-Don
14:00 MSK (UTC+3)	Sapeta (yellow card) 36'; Gațcan (yellow card) 67'	Report	Driussi (yellow card) 8'; Ivanović (yellow card) 43'; Ozdoyev (yellow card) 88'	Stadium: Olimp-2; Attendance: 12,873; Referee: Aleksey Eskov

1 April 2018 24	Ufa	1 – 2	Zenit St.Petersburg	Ufa
16:00 MSK (UTC+3)	Paurević 63'; Oblyakov (yellow card) 90+3'	Report	Ivanović 17'; Nedelcearu 21' (o.g.); Criscito (yellow card) 90+4'	Stadium: Neftyanik Stadium; Attendance: 8,524; Referee: Igor Fedotov

7 April 2018 25	Zenit St.Petersburg	1 – 2	Krasnodar	Saint Petersburg
16:30 MSK (UTC+3)	Yerokhin 33'; Paredes (yellow card) 63'; Mevlja (yellow card) 85'	Report	Shatov 22'; Mamayev (yellow card) 82'; Claesson 88'; Smolov (yellow card) 90+1'	Stadium: Krestovsky Stadium; Attendance: 47,306; Referee: Roman Galimov

14 April 2018 26	Zenit St.Petersburg	1 – 0	Anzhi Makhachkala	Saint Petersburg
16:30 MSK (UTC+3)	Driussi 36'; Smolnikov (yellow card) 39'; Criscito (yellow card) 52'; Lodygin (yellow card) 86'	Report	Khubulov (yellow card) 44'	Stadium: Krestovsky Stadium; Attendance: 38,048; Referee: Aleksei Matyunin

18 April 2018 23	Zenit St.Petersburg	2 – 1	Dynamo Moscow	Saint Petersburg
19:30 MSK (UTC+3)	Criscito 57' (pen.); Skrobotov 90+3'	Report	Morozov (yellow card) 57'; Šunjić 88'; Temnikov (yellow card) 90+2'	Stadium: Krestovsky Stadium; Attendance: 33,793; Referee: Mikhail Vilkov

22 April 2018 27	Arsenal Tula	3 – 3	Zenit St.Petersburg	Tula
14:00 MSK (UTC+3)	Gorbatenko 3' (yellow card) 23' (yellow-red card) 77'; Tkachyov 45' (yellow card) 45+1'; Aleksandrov (yellow card) 81'; Dzyuba 88'	Report	Driussi (yellow card) 26'; Paredes 36'; Kuzyayev 82', 84'	Stadium: Arsenal Stadium; Attendance: 17,650; Referee: Vladimir Moskalyov

29 April 2018 28	Zenit St.Petersburg	0 – 0	CSKA Moscow	Saint Petersburg
16:30 MSK (UTC+3)	Criscito (yellow card) 6'; Rigoni (yellow card) 84'; Paredes (yellow card) 90+3'	Report	Bistrović (yellow card) 5'; A.Berezutski (yellow card) 37'; V.Berezutski (yellow card) 43'; Shchennikov (yellow card) 58'	Stadium: Krestovsky Stadium; Attendance: 51,328; Referee: Roman Galimov

5 May 2018 29	Lokomotiv Moscow	1 – 0	Zenit St.Petersburg	Moscow
16:30 MSK (UTC+3)	Ignatyev (yellow card) 25'; Eder 87'; Guilherme (yellow card) 90+3'	Report	Driussi (yellow card) 25'; Kuzyayev (yellow card) 55'; Kranevitter (yellow card) 62'; Paredes (yellow card) 67'; Mevlja (yellow card) 76'	Stadium: RZD Arena; Attendance: 26,109; Referee: Sergey Ivanov

13 May 2018 30	Zenit St.Petersburg	6 – 0	SKA-Khabarovsk	Saint Petersburg
14:00 MSK (UTC+3)	Driussi 6'; Zabolotny 21'; Kuzyayev (yellow card) 37'; Yerokhin 38', 49', 60', 78'; Mevlja (yellow card) 54'; Zhirkov (yellow card) 56'	Report	Savichev (yellow card) 65'; Cherevko (yellow card) 74'	Stadium: Krestovsky Stadium; Attendance: 46,218; Referee: Aleksei Matyunin

==== League table ====
Pos	Team	Pld	W	D	L	GF	GA	GD	Pts	Qualification or relegation
3	Spartak Moscow	30	16	8	6	51	32	+19	56	Qualification for the Champions League third qualifying round
4	Krasnodar	30	16	6	8	46	30	+16	54	Qualification for the Europa League group stage (Note: Tosno qualified for the Europa League group stage by winning the 2017–18 Russian Cup. However, since they failed to obtain a UEFA licence, the spot awarded to the cup winners was passed to fourth-placed team, the spot awarded to the fourth-placed team was passed to fifth-placed team, and the spot awarded to the fifth-placed team was passed to sixth-placed team.)
5	Zenit Saint Petersburg	30	14	11	5	46	21	+25	53	Qualification for the Europa League third qualifying round
6	Ufa	30	11	10	9	34	30	+4	43	Qualification for the Europa League second qualifying round
7	Arsenal Tula	30	12	6	12	35	41	−6	42	

Updated to match(es) played on 13 May 2018. Source: Russian Premier League, Soccerway
Rules for classification: 1) Points; 2) Head-to-head points; 3) Head-to-head matches won; 4) Head-to-head goal difference; 5) Head-to-head goals scored; 6) Head-to-head away goals; 7) Matches won; 8) Goal difference; 9) Goals scored; 10) Away goals scored.

=== Russian Cup ===
21 September 2017 Round of 32	Dynamo St.Petersburg	3 – 2	Zenit St.Petersburg	Saint Petersburg
20:00 MSK (UTC+3)	Pesegov (yellow card) 32'; Kulishev 37', 111' (pen.); Barsov 43'; Tsveiba (yellow card) 74'; Markosov (yellow card) 117'	Report	Mevlja (red card) 10'; Paredes 60'; Poloz 62'; Kaplenko (yellow card) 110'	Stadium: Petrovsky Stadium; Attendance: 37,123; Referee: Pavel Kukuyan

=== UEFA Europa League ===
==== Qualifying rounds ====
27 July 2017 Third qualifying round 1st Leg	Bnei Yehuda (Israel)	0 – 2	(Russia) Zenit St.Petersburg	Petah Tikva, Israel
20:30 MSK (UTC+3)	Turjeman (yellow card) 35'	Report	Neto (yellow card) 42'; Criscito 59'; Kokorin 90'	Stadium: HaMoshava Stadium; Attendance: 3,200; Referee: Nikola Dabanović (Montenegro)

3 August 2017 Third qualifying round 2nd Leg	Zenit St.Petersburg (Russia)	0 – 1 (2 – 1 agg.)	(Israel) Bnei Yehuda	Saint Petersburg, Russia
20:00 MSK (UTC+3)	Driussi (yellow card) 85'	Report	Kandil (yellow card) 62'; Buzaglo 67'	Stadium: Krestovsky Stadium; Attendance: 45,670; Referee: Ali Palabıyık (Turkey)

16 August 2017 Playoff round 1st Leg	Utrecht (Netherlands)	1 – 0	(Russia) Zenit St.Petersburg	Utrecht, Netherlands
20:00 MSK (UTC+3)	Klaiber (yellow card) 61'; Labyad 77'; Ayoub (yellow card) 86'	Report		Stadium: Stadion Galgenwaard; Attendance: 19,370; Referee: Slavko Vinčić (Slovenia)

24 August 2017 Playoff round 2nd Leg	Zenit St.Petersburg (Russia)	2 – 0 (a.e.t.) (2 – 1 agg.)	(Netherlands) Utrecht	Saint Petersburg, Russia
20:00 MSK (UTC+3)	Kokorin 9', 105' (yellow card) 105+1'; Shatov (yellow card) 21'; Paredes (yellow card) 65'; Yerokhin (yellow card) 68'; Kranevitter (yellow card) 115'	Report	Labyad (yellow card) 65'	Stadium: Krestovsky Stadium; Attendance: 49,237; Referee: Carlos del Cerro Grande (Spain)

==== Group stage ====
Pos	Team	Pld	W	D	L	GF	GA	GD	Pts	Qualification	ZEN	RS	ROS	VRD
1	(Russia) Zenit Saint Petersburg	6	5	1	0	17	5	+12	16	Advance to knockout phase	—	3–1	3–1	2–1
2	(Spain) Real Sociedad	6	4	0	2	16	6	+10	12	Advance to knockout phase	1–3	—	4–0	3–0
3	(Norway) Rosenborg	6	1	2	3	6	11	−5	5		1–1	0–1	—	3–1
4	(North Macedonia) Vardar	6	0	1	5	3	20	−17	1		0–5	0–6	1–1	—

Source: UEFA

14 September 2017 1	Vardar (North Macedonia)	0 – 5	(Russia) Zenit St.Petersburg	Skopje, Macedonia
22:05 MSK (UTC+3)	Alves (yellow card) 43'; Jighauri (yellow card) 56'	Report	Kokorin 6', 21'; Dzyuba 39'; Ivanović 66'; Rigoni 89'	Stadium: Philip II Arena; Attendance: 11,118; Referee: Jakob Kehlet (Denmark)

28 September 2017 2	Zenit St.Petersburg (Russia)	3 – 1	(Spain) Real Sociedad	Saint Petersburg, Russia
20:00 MSK (UTC+3)	Rigoni 5'; Kokorin 24', 60'	Report	Llorente 41'	Stadium: Krestovsky Stadium; Attendance: 50,487; Referee: Andre Marriner (England)

19 October 2017 3	Zenit St.Petersburg (Russia)	3 – 1	(Norway) Rosenborg	Saint Petersburg, Russia
20:00 MSK (UTC+3)	Rigoni 1', 68', 75'; Paredes (yellow card) 39'	Report	Hedenstad (yellow card) 14'; Trondsen (yellow card) 35'; Helland 88'	Stadium: Krestovsky Stadium; Attendance: 46,211; Referee: Tobias Stieler (Germany)

2 November 2017 4	Rosenborg (Norway)	1 – 1	(Russia) Zenit St.Petersburg	Trondheim, Norway
22:05 MSK (UTC+3)	Reginiussen (yellow card) 42'; Bendtner 55' (pen.)	Report	Yerokhin (yellow card) 33'; Criscito (yellow card) 73'; Kokorin 90+3'	Stadium: Lerkendal Stadion; Referee: Serdar Gözübüyük (Netherlands)

23 November 2017 5	Zenit St.Petersburg (Russia)	2 – 1	(North Macedonia) Vardar	Saint Petersburg, Russia
20:00 MSK (UTC+3)	Poloz 16'; Dzyuba (penalty missed) 27'; Rigoni 43'; Terentyev (yellow card) 71'	Report	Demiri (yellow card) 54'; Hambardzumyan (yellow card) 77'; Blazhevski 90+3'	Stadium: Krestovsky Stadium; Referee: Bart Vertenten (Belgium)

7 December 2017 6	Real Sociedad (Spain)	1 – 3	(Russia) Zenit St.Petersburg	San Sebastián, Spain
23:05 MSK (UTC+3)	Willian José 58'; Canales (yellow card) 77'	Report	Kranevitter (yellow card) 28'; Yerokhin 35' (yellow card) 76'; Ivanović 64'; Paredes 85'	Stadium: Anoeta; Referee: Liran Liany (Israel)

==== Knockout phase ====
15 February 2018 Round of 32 1st Leg	Celtic (Scotland)	1 – 0	(Russia) Zenit St.Petersburg	Glasgow, Scotland
23:05 MSK (UTC+3)	Ntcham (yellow card) 56'; Kouassi (yellow card) 73'; McGregor 78'; Brown (yellow card) 83'; Dembélé (yellow card) 84'; Lustig (yellow card) 85'	Report	Kuzyayev (yellow card) 36'; Criscito (yellow card) 64'; Smolnikov (yellow card) 76'; Paredes (yellow card) 83'; Kranevitter (yellow card) 87'	Stadium: Celtic Park; Attendance: 56,743; Referee: Damir Skomina (Slovenia)

22 February 2018 Round of 32 2nd Leg	Zenit St.Petersburg (Russia)	3 – 0 (3 – 1 agg.)	(Scotland) Celtic	Saint Petersburg, Russia
21:00 MSK (UTC+3)	Ivanović 8'; Kuzyayev (yellow card) 11' (goal) 27'; Paredes (yellow card) 21'; Kokorin 61'	Report	Kouassi (yellow card) 36'; Dembélé (yellow card) 45+1'	Stadium: Krestovsky Stadium; Attendance: 50,492; Referee: Antonio Mateu Lahoz (Spain)

8 March 2018 Round of 16 1st Leg	RB Leipzig (Germany)	2 – 1	(Russia) Zenit St.Petersburg	Leipzig, Germany
23:05 MSK (UTC+3)	Bruma 56'; Werner 77'; Upamecano (yellow card) 85'	Report	Criscito 86'	Stadium: Red Bull Arena; Attendance: 19,877; Referee: Ovidiu Hațegan (Romania)

15 March 2018 Round of 16 2nd Leg	Zenit St.Petersburg (Russia)	1 – 1 (2 – 3 agg.)	(Germany) RB Leipzig	Saint Petersburg, Russia
21:00 MSK (UTC+3)	Criscito (yellow card) 38'; Driussi 45+1'; Smolnikov (yellow card) 62'; Mevlja (yellow card) 81'	Report	Demme (yellow card) 10'; Augustin 22'; Orban (yellow card) 25'; Werner (penalty missed) 82'	Stadium: Krestovsky Stadium; Referee: Daniele Orsato (Italy)

== Squad statistics ==
As of match played 13 May 2018

=== Appearances and goals ===
No.	Pos	Nat	Player	Total		Premier League		Russian Cup		Europa League	
No.	Pos	Nat	Player	Apps	Goals	Apps	Goals	Apps	Goals	Apps	Goals
1	GK	(Russia) RUS	Yuri Lodygin	15	0	9+2	0	1	0	3	0
2	DF	(Russia) RUS	Aleksandr Anyukov	4	0	0+1	0	1	0	2	0
3	DF	(Russia) RUS	Denis Terentyev	8	0	2+2	0	1	0	2+1	0
4	DF	(Italy) ITA	Domenico Criscito	40	6	28	4	0	0	12	2
5	MF	(Argentina) ARG	Leandro Paredes	39	6	25+3	4	1	1	8+2	1
7	FW	(Russia) RUS	Dmitry Poloz	31	3	10+9	1	1	1	4+7	1
8	MF	(Argentina) ARG	Matías Kranevitter	33	0	15+6	0	0	0	8+4	0
9	FW	(Russia) RUS	Aleksandr Kokorin	35	19	21+1	10	0	0	11+2	9
10	MF	(Argentina) ARG	Emiliano Rigoni	28	6	9+8	0	1	0	9+1	6
11	FW	(Argentina) ARG	Sebastián Driussi	40	6	20+7	5	0+1	0	5+7	1
14	MF	(Russia) RUS	Daler Kuzyayev	36	7	22+4	6	0+1	0	6+3	1
15	DF	(Russia) RUS	Elmir Nabiullin	2	0	0+2	0	0	0	0	0
18	DF	(Russia) RUS	Yuri Zhirkov	25	1	10+7	1	1	0	5+2	0
19	DF	(Russia) RUS	Igor Smolnikov	29	0	20+2	0	0	0	6+1	0
21	MF	(Russia) RUS	Aleksandr Yerokhin	39	8	25+2	7	0	0	8+4	1
23	DF	(Slovenia) SLO	Miha Mevlja	29	0	16+2	0	1	0	10	0
27	MF	(Russia) RUS	Magomed Ozdoyev	4	0	3+1	0	0	0	0	0
29	FW	(Russia) RUS	Anton Zabolotny	14	1	7+3	1	0	0	3+1	0
30	DF	(Argentina) ARG	Emanuel Mammana	26	0	16	0	0	0	10	0
33	FW	(Russia) RUS	Andrei Panyukov	2	0	0+2	0	0	0	0	0
49	MF	(Russia) RUS	Dmitri Pletnyov	1	0	0+1	0	0	0	0	0
54	DF	(Russia) RUS	Nikita Kakkoyev	1	0	0+1	0	0	0	0	0
55	MF	(Belarus) BLR	Kirill Kaplenko	3	0	1+1	0	1	0	0	0
60	DF	(Serbia) SRB	Branislav Ivanović	38	5	27	2	0	0	10+1	3
71	GK	(Russia) RUS	Yegor Baburin	1	0	1	0	0	0	0	0
80	DF	(Russia) RUS	Ilya Skrobotov	4	1	1+3	1	0	0	0	0
99	GK	(Russia) RUS	Andrey Lunyov	31	0	20	0	0	0	11	0
Players away from the club on loan:
13	DF	(Portugal) POR	Luís Neto	6	0	3+1	0	0	0	2	0
16	MF	(Ecuador) ECU	Christian Noboa	9	0	2	0	1	0	5+1	0
17	MF	(Russia) RUS	Oleg Shatov	16	0	8+5	0	0	0	3	0
22	FW	(Russia) RUS	Artem Dzyuba	24	2	7+8	1	0+1	0	3+5	1
23	MF	(Brazil) BRA	Hernani	2	0	0+1	0	0	0	1	0
25	DF	(Russia) RUS	Ivan Novoseltsev	1	0	0	0	1	0	0	0
50	DF	(Russia) RUS	Maksim Karpov	1	0	0	0	0	0	0+1	0
Players who left Zenit St.Petersburg during the season:
6	MF	(Spain) ESP	Javi García	3	0	1	0	0	0	2	0
10	MF	(Brazil) BRA	Giuliano	4	0	1+1	0	0	0	2	0

=== Goalscorers ===
Place	Position	Nation	Number	Name	Premier League	Russian Cup	Europa League	Total
1	FW	(Russia)	9	Aleksandr Kokorin	10	0	9	19
2	DF	(Russia)	21	Aleksandr Yerokhin	7	0	1	8
3	MF	(Russia)	14	Daler Kuzyayev	6	0	1	7
3	FW	(Argentina)	11	Sebastián Driussi	5	0	1	6
3	MF	(Argentina)	5	Leandro Paredes	4	1	1	6
3	DF	(Italy)	4	Domenico Criscito	4	0	2	6
3	MF	(Argentina)	10	Emiliano Rigoni	0	0	6	6
8	DF	(Serbia)	60	Branislav Ivanović	2	0	3	5
9	FW	(Russia)	7	Dmitry Poloz	1	1	1	3
9				Own goal	3	0	0	3
11	FW	(Russia)	22	Artem Dzyuba	1	0	1	2
12	DF	(Russia)	18	Yuri Zhirkov	1	0	0	1
12	DF	(Russia)	80	Ilya Skrobotov	1	0	0	1
12	FW	(Russia)	29	Anton Zabolotny	1	0	0	1
				TOTALS	46	2	26	74

=== Disciplinary record ===
Number	Nation	Position	Name	Premier League		Russian Cup		Super Cup		Total	
Number	Nation	Position	Name	Yellow card	Red card	Yellow card	Red card	Yellow card	Red card	Yellow card	Red card
1	(Russia)	GK	Yuri Lodygin	1	0	0	0	0	0	1	0
3	(Russia)	DF	Denis Terentyev	1	0	0	0	1	0	2	0
4	(Italy)	DF	Domenico Criscito	7	1	0	0	3	0	10	1
5	(Argentina)	MF	Leandro Paredes	11	0	0	0	4	0	15	0
7	(Russia)	FW	Dmitry Poloz	1	0	0	0	0	0	1	0
8	(Argentina)	MF	Matías Kranevitter	4	0	0	0	3	0	7	0
9	(Russia)	FW	Aleksandr Kokorin	2	0	0	0	1	0	3	0
10	(Argentina)	MF	Emiliano Rigoni	4	0	0	0	0	0	4	0
11	(Argentina)	FW	Sebastián Driussi	3	0	0	0	1	0	4	0
14	(Russia)	MF	Daler Kuzyayev	3	0	0	0	2	0	5	0
18	(Russia)	DF	Yuri Zhirkov	2	0	0	0	0	0	2	0
19	(Russia)	DF	Igor Smolnikov	4	1	0	0	3	0	7	1
21	(Russia)	MF	Aleksandr Yerokhin	6	1	0	0	2	0	8	1
23	(Slovenia)	DF	Miha Mevlja	4	0	0	1	1	0	5	1
27	(Russia)	MF	Magomed Ozdoyev	1	0	0	0	0	0	1	0
29	(Russia)	FW	Anton Zabolotny	1	0	0	0	0	0	1	0
55	(Belarus)	MF	Kirill Kaplenko	0	0	1	0	0	0	1	0
60	(Serbia)	DF	Branislav Ivanović	1	0	0	0	0	0	1	0
99	(Russia)	GK	Andrey Lunyov	1	0	0	0	0	0	1	0
Players away from Zenit on loan:
13	(Portugal)	DF	Luís Neto	1	0	0	0	1	0	2	0
17	(Russia)	MF	Oleg Shatov	0	0	0	0	1	0	1	0
22	(Russia)	FW	Artem Dzyuba	1	0	0	0	0	0	1	0
			TOTALS	59	3	1	1	23	0	83	4
