= List of Russian football transfers summer 2017 =

This is a list of Russian football transfers in the 2017 summer transfer window by club. Only clubs of the 2017–18 Russian Premier League are included.

== Russian Premier League 2017–18 ==
=== Akhmat Grozny ===
In: Note: Flags indicate national team as defined under FIFA eligibility rules; some limited exceptions apply. Players may hold more than one non-FIFA nationality.

No.	Pos.	Nation	Player
8	FW	BRA	Léo Jabá (from (Brazil) Corinthians)
11	MF	BRA	Ismael (from (Sweden) Kalmar)
14	MF	BRA	Ravanelli (from (Brazil) Ponte Preta)
23	MF	RUS	Anton Shvets (from (Spain) Villarreal B)
24	MF	RUS	Roland Gigolayev (from Amkar Perm)
53	MF	RUS	Minkail Matsuyev
57	GK	RUS	Rasul Umayev
67	MF	RUS	Adam Osmayev
88	MF	RUS	Islam Ediyev
93	FW	RUS	Apti Akhyadov (end of loan to Spartak Nalchik)
94	DF	BRA	Philipe Sampaio (from (Portugal) Boavista)

Out: Note: Flags indicate national team as defined under FIFA eligibility rules; some limited exceptions apply. Players may hold more than one non-FIFA nationality.

No.	Pos.	Nation	Player
1	GK	UKR	Yaroslav Hodzyur (to Ural Yekaterinburg)
3	DF	SVK	Norbert Gyömbér (end of loan from (Italy) Roma)
10	MF	ROU	Gheorghe Grozav (to (Turkey) Karabükspor)
11	MF	ROU	Gabriel Torje (on loan to (Turkey) Karabükspor)
14	MF	RUS	Daler Kuzyayev (to Zenit St. Petersburg)
22	MF	RUS	Reziuan Mirzov (to Rostov)
23	MF	URU	Facundo Píriz (on loan to (France) Montpellier)
25	DF	RUS	Khalid Shakhtiyev (on loan to Spartak Nalchik)
27	MF	RUS	Magomed Ozdoyev (end of loan from Rubin Kazan)
35	GK	RUS	Ibragim-Sayfullakh Gaziyev
39	FW	RUS	Ruslan Khusainov
53	FW	RUS	Bilal Umarov
55	FW	RUS	Igor Lebedenko (to Ararat Moscow)
57	DF	RUS	Zubayr Madayev (to Shinnik Yaroslavl)
67	DF	RUS	Khalid Saytkhadzhiyev
88	MF	RUS	Ayub Magamayev
90	DF	RUS	Idris Musluyev (on loan to Spartak Nalchik)
98	MF	RUS	Chingiz Magomadov (on loan to Spartak Nalchik)

=== Amkar Perm ===
In: Note: Flags indicate national team as defined under FIFA eligibility rules; some limited exceptions apply. Players may hold more than one non-FIFA nationality.

No.	Pos.	Nation	Player
1	GK	RUS	Artur Nigmatullin (from Tosno)
17	MF	RUS	Mikhail Gashchenkov (from Khimki)
18	DF	BLR	Mikhail Sivakow (from Orenburg)
21	DF	RUS	Vasili Aleynikov (end of loan to Pskov-747)
23	FW	MNE	Drago Milović (from (Montenegro) Hajduk Bar)
26	FW	CRC	Felicio Brown Forbes (from Arsenal Tula)
31	FW	RUS	Arseni Pavlenko
32	MF	RUS	Ivan Melnikov (from Torpedo Moscow)
36	DF	RUS	Dmitri Chaadayev
37	DF	RUS	Maksim Luzin
41	DF	RUS	Dmitri Belorukov (on loan from Dynamo Moscow)
49	DF	RUS	Aleksandr Link
50	GK	RUS	Dmitri Bashkirtsev
55	DF	RUS	Stepan Ostanin
57	MF	RUS	Daniil Frentsel
60	MF	RUS	Denis Fedorochev
66	MF	IRI	Saeid Ezatolahi (on loan from Rostov)
67	MF	RUS	Maksim Sedov
76	MF	RUS	Timur Farrakhov
91	MF	RUS	Aleksandr Ryazantsev (on loan from Zenit St. Petersburg)
99	GK	RUS	Yegor Sedov (from Anzhi Makhachkala)

Out: Note: Flags indicate national team as defined under FIFA eligibility rules; some limited exceptions apply. Players may hold more than one non-FIFA nationality.

No.	Pos.	Nation	Player
7	FW	UKR	Anton Shynder
13	MF	RUS	Roland Gigolayev (to Akhmat Grozny)
23	DF	RUS	Ivan Cherenchikov (to Baltika Kaliningrad)
25	MF	RUS	David Khurtsidze (to (Georgia (country)) Torpedo Kutaisi)
33	MF	SRB	Branko Jovičić (to (Serbia) Red Star Belgrade)
34	DF	RUS	Mikhail Kondrashov
37	DF	RUS	Nikolai Tarasov (to Dynamo-2 St. Petersburg)
40	MF	RUS	Vladislav Razdelkin (to Titan Klin)
41	GK	RUS	Roman Pshukov (to Biolog-Novokubansk)
51	DF	RUS	Nikita Romaschenko (to Khimik Novomoskovsk)
72	FW	RUS	Aleksandr Melekhov
94	DF	RUS	Aleksandr Bushmin
98	GK	RUS	Aleksandr Budakov (to Anzhi Makhachkala)
99	MF	UKR	Oleh Mishchenko
—	DF	RUS	Soslan Takazov (to Volgar Astrakhan, previously on loan)
—	MF	RUS	Ivan Belikov (to Khimki, previously on loan to (Belarus) Naftan Novopolotsk)
—	MF	RUS	David Dzakhov (to Orenburg, previously on loan to Shinnik Yaroslavl)

=== Anzhi Makhachkala ===
In: Note: Flags indicate national team as defined under FIFA eligibility rules; some limited exceptions apply. Players may hold more than one non-FIFA nationality.

No.	Pos.	Nation	Player
1	GK	RUS	Aleksei Solosin (from Tom Tomsk)
3	DF	RUS	Vladimir Poluyakhtov (from Orenburg)
4	DF	UKR	Ihor Chaykovskyi (from (Ukraine) Zorya Luhansk)
6	MF	RUS	Pavel Karasyov (from SKA-Khabarovsk)
7	MF	RUS	Adlan Katsayev (loan extended from Akhmat Grozny)
9	FW	RUS	Konstantin Bazelyuk (on loan from CSKA Moscow)
10	MF	GEO	Jaba Lipartia (from (Ukraine) Zorya Luhansk)
14	DF	MDA	Igor Armaș (from Kuban Krasnodar)
21	DF	RUS	Alan Bagayev (from Mordovia Saransk)
24	DF	RUS	Dzhambolat Bolatov
25	MF	ETH	Gatoch Panom (from (Ethiopia) Ethiopian Coffee)
29	MF	UZB	Vadim Afonin (from Orenburg)
30	MF	RUS	Ramazan Kerimov
31	DF	RUS	Nikita Chistyakov
32	MF	RUS	Muslim Shikhbabayev
33	DF	RUS	Igor Udaly (from SKA-Khabarovsk)
35	DF	RUS	Mukhtar Khanmurzayev
36	FW	RUS	Raul Shikhayev
38	MF	RUS	Anar Panayev (from own academy)
39	GK	RUS	Timur Magomedov
41	MF	RUS	Anvar Gazimagomedov (from Armavir)
47	GK	GEO	Giorgi Loria (on loan from Krylia Sovetov Samara)
48	MF	RUS	Aleksandr Bataev (from (Greece) PAOK)
51	MF	RUS	Aleksey Shishkin
52	DF	SLO	Miral Samardžić (from (Turkey) Akhisar Belediyespor)
57	DF	RUS	Magomednabi Yagyayev (registered in April 2017)
63	DF	RUS	Yarakhmed Makhmudov
69	GK	RUS	Maksim Bogatyryov (from Lokomotiv Moscow)
75	MF	RUS	Zaur Pirakhmedov
77	MF	RUS	Ayaz Guliyev (loan extended from Spartak Moscow)
78	MF	RUS	Mikhail Bakayev (from (Kazakhstan) Kairat)
85	MF	RUS	Zikrula Magomedov
88	FW	RUS	Ivan Markelov (from Dynamo Moscow)
94	MF	UKR	Oleh Danchenko (on loan from (Ukraine) Shakhtar Donetsk)
96	FW	RUS	Dzhamal Dibirgadzhiyev (end of loan to (Portugal) Fátima)
97	FW	RUS	Khasan Mamtov (from Tyumen)
98	GK	RUS	Aleksandr Budakov (from Amkar Perm)
99	FW	ARG	Juan Lescano (from SKA-Khabarovsk)

Out: Note: Flags indicate national team as defined under FIFA eligibility rules; some limited exceptions apply. Players may hold more than one non-FIFA nationality.

No.	Pos.	Nation	Player
1	GK	RUS	David Yurchenko (to Tosno)
4	DF	UKR	Maksym Bilyi (to (Ukraine) Mariupol)
5	DF	RUS	Aleksandr Zhirov (end of loan from Krasnodar)
6	MF	IRI	Saeid Ezatolahi (end of loan from Rostov)
6	MF	RUS	Pavel Karasyov (on loan to SKA-Khabarovsk)
7	DF	RUS	Kamil Agalarov
9	FW	RUS	Shamil Asildarov
13	MF	RUS	Dmitri Kudryashov (to Anzhi-Yunior Zelenodolsk)
14	DF	RUS	Aslan Dudiyev (to Tosno)
15	MF	UKR	Dmytro Shcherbak (to Olimpiyets Nizhny Novgorod)
16	GK	RUS	Yury Shafinsky (to Tom Tomsk)
17	MF	RUS	Svyatoslav Georgiyevsky (to Krylia Sovetov Samara)
21	MF	RUS	Maksim Batov (to Khimki)
21	DF	RUS	Alan Bagayev
22	MF	RUS	Sergey Karetnik (to Tom Tomsk)
24	DF	RUS	Sergei Parshivlyuk (to Rostov)
26	DF	BRA	Xandão (to (Spain) Sporting Gijón)
28	FW	UKR	Pylyp Budkivskyi (end of loan from (Ukraine) Shakhtar Donetsk)
30	DF	RUS	Shamil Gasanov (to (Norway) Tromsø)
33	DF	RUS	Igor Udaly (on loan to Orenburg)
49	MF	RUS	Yuri Kuzmin
59	DF	RUS	Mariz Saidov (to Anzhi-Yunior Zelenodolsk)
62	MF	RUS	Shakhban Gaydarov (to Anzhi-2 Makhachkala)
67	MF	RUS	Alan Yarikbayev (to Anzhi-2 Makhachkala)
68	MF	RUS	Roman Khodakovsky (to KAMAZ Naberezhnye Chelny)
69	GK	RUS	Yegor Sedov (to Amkar Perm)
70	FW	RUS	Rashid Magomedov (to Anzhi-2 Makhachkala)
73	MF	RUS	Chingiz Agabalayev (to Anzhi-2 Makhachkala)
78	MF	RUS	Timur Patakhov (to Anzhi-2 Makhachkala)
79	FW	RUS	Said Aliyev (to Anzhi-2 Makhachkala)
80	MF	RUS	Tamerlan Ramazanov (to Anzhi-2 Makhachkala)
83	MF	RUS	Gadzhi Adzhiyev (to Anzhi-2 Makhachkala)
85	GK	RUS	Aleksandr Filtsov (end of loan from Rubin Kazan)
90	MF	RUS	Andrei Lyakh (to Shinnik Yaroslavl)
94	FW	CRC	Felicio Brown Forbes (end of loan from Arsenal Tula)
95	DF	RUS	Magomed Elmurzayev (to Anzhi-2 Makhachkala)
96	MF	RUS	Danil Glebov (joined in April 2017)
97	MF	RUS	Magomed Magomedov (to Anzhi-2 Makhachkala)
97	FW	RUS	Khasan Mamtov (to Orenburg)
—	DF	RUS	Anton Belov (to Anzhi-2 Makhachkala, previously on loan to Zenit Penza)
—	DF	MDA	Valeriu Ciupercă (to Baltika Kaliningrad, previously on loan to Tom Tomsk)
—	DF	RUS	Georgi Tigiyev (to Spartak Moscow, previously on loan)

=== Arsenal Tula ===
In: Note: Flags indicate national team as defined under FIFA eligibility rules; some limited exceptions apply. Players may hold more than one non-FIFA nationality.

No.	Pos.	Nation	Player
10	FW	ZAM	Evans Kangwa (from (Turkey) Gaziantepspor)
11	MF	RUS	Sergei Tkachyov (on loan from CSKA Moscow)
18	FW	MNE	Luka Đorđević (on loan from Zenit St. Petersburg)
20	MF	SRB	Goran Čaušić (from (Spain) Osasuna)
21	DF	ESP	Víctor Álvarez (from (Spain) Espanyol)
25	DF	RUS	Artyom Yarmolitsky
42	MF	RUS	Aleksandr Grebenshchikov
47	DF	RUS	Svyatoslav Artyushkin
54	MF	RUS	Osman Isayev
58	FW	RUS	Artyom Maksimenko (from Spartak Dzhankoy)
81	MF	RUS	Vladimir Kabakhidze (from CSKA Moscow)
91	FW	RUS	Konstantin Antipov (from Tom Tomsk)
95	DF	RUS	Andrei Shustov (from Chertanovo-M Moscow)
96	GK	RUS	Aleksandr Mironov
98	MF	RUS	Denis Sedykh (from Dynamo-2 Moscow)

Out: Note: Flags indicate national team as defined under FIFA eligibility rules; some limited exceptions apply. Players may hold more than one non-FIFA nationality.

No.	Pos.	Nation	Player
2	DF	RUS	Ivan Yershov (to Pskov-747)
18	MF	RUS	Nikita Burmistrov (to Baltika Kaliningrad)
20	MF	RUS	Vadim Steklov (to Yenisey Krasnoyarsk)
21	DF	COL	Jherson Vergara (end of loan from (Italy) Milan)
26	MF	MLI	Moussa Doumbia (end of loan from Rostov)
27	MF	RUS	Artyom Mingazov (on loan to Khimik Novomoskovsk)
28	MF	RUS	Vladislav Ryzhkov (on loan to Tambov)
42	MF	RUS	Atsamaz Torchinov
44	FW	RUS	Roman Izotov (on loan to Torpedo Moscow)
47	DF	RUS	Andrius Rukas (to (Portugal) União de Leiria)
48	MF	RUS	Roman Pekulov
49	MF	RUS	Nikita Golub (to CRFSO Smolensk)
50	GK	RUS	Aleksandr Puchkov
54	MF	RUS	Daniil Zuyev
59	MF	RUS	Kirill Chernov
65	MF	RUS	Ilya Savkin
66	DF	RUS	Yevgeni Yezhov (to Khimik Novomoskovsk)
67	DF	RUS	Aleksandr Tsogoyev
69	FW	RUS	Sergei Stepanov
70	FW	RUS	Valeri Alshanskiy
72	FW	RUS	Aleksandr Zharinov
74	DF	RUS	Ilya Salnikov (to Zorky Krasnogorsk)
75	DF	RUS	Stepan Rebenko
76	MF	RUS	Maksim Zhumabekov (to UOR #5 Yegoryevsk)
80	MF	RUS	Aleksandr Gordiyenko
82	GK	RUS	Vladislav Suslov (to Chayka Peschanokopskoye)
83	DF	RUS	Kirill Merkotan
84	MF	RUS	Oleg Vlasov (to Dynamo St. Petersburg)
85	GK	RUS	Maksim Staroverov (to Zenit Penza)
86	DF	BUL	Ivan Ivanov (to (Bulgaria) Beroe Stara Zagora)
87	MF	RUS	Aleksandr Kotenko
91	DF	RUS	Nikita Sorokin
92	MF	RUS	Aleksei Kiselyov
94	DF	RUS	Aleksandr Matrenov
95	DF	RUS	Artur Farion
96	DF	RUS	Yanis Linda (to Khimik Novomoskovsk)
97	FW	RUS	Vladislav Kormishin (to Akademiya Futbola Rostov-on-Don)
99	MF	RUS	Dmitri Starodub (to Veles Moscow)
99	MF	RUS	Andrei Potapov (to Rostov)
—	DF	RUS	Aleksandr Stolyarenko (on loan to Rotor Volgograd, previously on loan to Tambov)
—	MF	RUS	Sergei Ignatyev (to Chelyabinsk, previously on loan to Sochi)
—	FW	CRC	Felicio Brown Forbes (to Amkar Perm, previously on loan to Anzhi Makhachkala)

=== CSKA Moscow ===
In: Note: Flags indicate national team as defined under FIFA eligibility rules; some limited exceptions apply. Players may hold more than one non-FIFA nationality.

No.	Pos.	Nation	Player
31	MF	RUS	Aleksandr Makarov (end of loan to Tosno)
77	GK	RUS	Nikolay Zirikov

Out: Note: Flags indicate national team as defined under FIFA eligibility rules; some limited exceptions apply. Players may hold more than one non-FIFA nationality.

No.	Pos.	Nation	Player
1	GK	RUS	Sergei Chepchugov (to Yenisey Krasnoyarsk)
7	MF	SRB	Zoran Tošić (to (Serbia) Partizan)
9	FW	RUS	Konstantin Bazelyuk (on loan to Anzhi Makhachkala, previously on loan to (Portugal) Estoril)
11	MF	RUS	Aleksei Ionov (end of loan from Dynamo Moscow)
25	MF	FIN	Roman Eremenko (banned)
49	MF	RUS	Tigran Avanesyan
50	DF	RUS	Vadim Konyukhov
51	MF	RUS	Danil Savinykh
52	FW	RUS	Yegor Shapovalov
55	DF	RUS	Mutalip Alibekov (to Khimki)
76	MF	RUS	Artyom Avanesyan (to Zenit Penza)
81	MF	RUS	Vladimir Kabakhidze (to Arsenal Tula)
91	DF	RUS	Nikita Chernov (on loan to Ural Yekaterinburg, previously on loan to Yenisey Krasnoyarsk)
—	MF	RUS	Sergei Tkachyov (on loan to Arsenal Tula, previously on loan to Krylia Sovetov Samara)
—	FW	RUS	Kirill Panchenko (to Dynamo Moscow, previously on loan)

=== Dynamo Moscow ===
In: Note: Flags indicate national team as defined under FIFA eligibility rules; some limited exceptions apply. Players may hold more than one non-FIFA nationality.

No.	Pos.	Nation	Player
6	MF	SEN	Khaly Thiam (on loan from (Hungary) MTK Budapest)
7	MF	RUS	Aleksei Ionov (end of loan to CSKA Moscow)
8	FW	RUS	Kirill Panchenko (from CSKA Moscow, previously on loan)
14	FW	BRA	Wánderson (from Krasnodar)
15	DF	RUS	Ibragim Tsallagov (on loan from Zenit St. Petersburg)
16	GK	RUS	Ivan Zirikov (from Dynamo-2 Moscow)
20	MF	RUS	Vyacheslav Grulyov (from Dynamo-2 Moscow)
22	DF	RUS	Maksim Nenakhov (from Dynamo-2 Moscow)
24	DF	RUS	Roman Yevgenyev (from Dynamo-2 Moscow)
27	MF	MLI	Samba Sow (from (Turkey) Kayserispor)
35	GK	RUS	Pyotr Kosarevsky (from Dynamo-2 Moscow)
44	DF	BIH	Toni Šunjić (from (Germany) VfB Stuttgart)
52	DF	RUS	Ilya Panin (from Dynamo-2 Moscow)
53	GK	RUS	Maksim Afanasyev
54	DF	RUS	Ilya Kalachyov
55	FW	RUS	Kirill Burykin (from Dynamo-2 Moscow)
56	MF	RUS	Viktor Demyanov (from Dynamo-2 Moscow)
57	MF	RUS	Ilya Gomanyuk
59	DF	RUS	Daniil Yermolin
61	GK	RUS	David Sangare
62	DF	RUS	Bogdan Zorin
63	FW	RUS	Mikhail Ageyev
65	MF	RUS	Vladimir Moskvichyov
67	DF	RUS	Stanislav Tses
68	MF	RUS	Georgi Chelidze
69	FW	RUS	Semyon Belyakov
71	DF	RUS	Roman Denisov
78	DF	RUS	Danil Lipovoy (from Dynamo-2 Moscow)
79	MF	RUS	Sergei Slepov (from Dynamo-2 Moscow)
92	FW	RUS	Maksim Obolsky
99	FW	RUS	Stanislav Latsevich (from Dynamo-2 Moscow)

Out: Note: Flags indicate national team as defined under FIFA eligibility rules; some limited exceptions apply. Players may hold more than one non-FIFA nationality.

No.	Pos.	Nation	Player
5	DF	RUS	Vitali Dyakov (to (Turkey) Sivasspor)
7	MF	RUS	Aleksei Ionov (to Rostov)
12	DF	RUS	Dmitri Belorukov (on loan to Amkar Perm)
14	MF	RUS	Ivan Markelov (to Anzhi Makhachkala)
43	GK	RUS	Stanislav Cherchesov Jr. (to Chernomorets Novorossiysk)
29	DF	AUS	Luke Wilkshire (to (Australia) Sydney)
87	MF	RUS	Valeri Saramutin (to Dynamo St. Petersburg)
—	MF	RUS	Igor Denisov (to Lokomotiv Moscow, previously on loan)
—	MF	RUS	Ilya Petrov (on loan to Avangard Kursk, previously on loan to Mordovia Saransk)

=== Krasnodar ===
In: Note: Flags indicate national team as defined under FIFA eligibility rules; some limited exceptions apply. Players may hold more than one non-FIFA nationality.

No.	Pos.	Nation	Player
7	FW	BRA	Wanderson (from (Austria) Red Bull Salzburg)
9	FW	ROU	Andrei Ivan (from (Romania) Universitatea Craiova)
26	DF	RUS	Aleksei Gritsayenko (from Luch-Energiya Vladivostok)
27	MF	SRB	Mihailo Ristić (from (Serbia) Red Star Belgrade)
30	DF	RUS	Roman Shishkin (from Lokomotiv Moscow, previously on loan)
35	MF	RUS	Sergei Peterson
37	FW	RUS	Ilya Vorotnikov
51	FW	RUS	Shamil Mavlyanov
55	DF	RUS	Renat Yanbayev (from Lokomotiv Moscow)
56	FW	RUS	Ilya Belous (end of loan to (Moldova) Milsami Orhei)
64	MF	RUS	Aleksandr Morgunov (end of loan to (Moldova) Milsami Orhei)
73	GK	RUS	Nikita Yegyazarov
79	DF	RUS	Yevgeni Nesterenko (end of loan to Afips Afipsky)
89	FW	RUS	Aleksandr Ageyev (end of loan to Energomash Belgorod)
90	DF	NOR	Stefan Strandberg (end of loan to (Germany) Hannover 96)

Out: Note: Flags indicate national team as defined under FIFA eligibility rules; some limited exceptions apply. Players may hold more than one non-FIFA nationality.

No.	Pos.	Nation	Player
3	DF	BRA	Naldo (to (Spain) Espanyol)
5	MF	RUS	Dmitri Torbinski
5	DF	RUS	Aleksandr Zhirov (to Krasnodar-2, previously on loan to Anzhi Makhachkala)
14	FW	BRA	Wánderson (to Dynamo Moscow)
17	DF	RUS	Vitali Kaleshin (retired)
18	MF	RUS	Vladimir Bystrov (to Tosno)
19	GK	RUS	Ilya Abayev (end of loan from Lokomotiv Moscow)
20	FW	RUS	Nikolay Komlichenko (on loan to (Czech Republic) Mladá Boleslav)
32	DF	RUS	Vasili Cherov
35	FW	RUS	Alim Makoyev (to Kubanskaya Korona Shevchenko)
37	DF	RUS	Grigori Ziganshin
49	FW	RUS	Dmitri Bakay (on loan to Chernomorets Novorossiysk)
51	GK	RUS	Ivan Salnikov (to (Spain) Getafe)
59	MF	RUS	Ilya Borisov (on loan to Chayka Peschanokopskoye, previously on loan to Armavir)
74	MF	RUS	Daniil Fomin (on loan to Olimpiyets Nizhny Novgorod)
97	FW	RUS	Nurik Gadzhiyev
—	GK	RUS	Denis Kavlinov (to Kuban Krasnodar, previously on loan to Dynamo St. Petersburg)
—	DF	RUS	Aleksandr Marchenko (on loan to Luch-Energiya Vladivostok, previously on loan to Spartak Nalchik)
—	DF	RUS	Maksim Starkov (on loan to Dynamo Bryansk, previously on loan to Dynamo St. Petersburg)
—	MF	RUS	Oleg Lanin (on loan to Krylia Sovetov Samara, previously on loan to Yenisey Krasnoyarsk)
—	FW	RUS	Ruslan Bolov (on loan to Avangard Kursk, previously on loan to Fakel Voronezh)

=== Lokomotiv Moscow ===
In: Note: Flags indicate national team as defined under FIFA eligibility rules; some limited exceptions apply. Players may hold more than one non-FIFA nationality.

No.	Pos.	Nation	Player
13	FW	RUS	Arshak Koryan (from (Netherlands) Vitesse)
24	FW	POR	Eder (on loan from (France) Lille)
27	MF	RUS	Igor Denisov (from Dynamo Moscow, previously on loan)
30	GK	RUS	Nikita Medvedev (from Rostov)
31	MF	POL	Maciej Rybus (from (France) Lyon)
33	DF	GEO	Solomon Kvirkvelia (from Rubin Kazan, previously on loan)
38	MF	RUS	Andrei Shigorev (from Saturn Ramenskoye)
39	MF	RUS	Artyom Ponikarov (from Afips Afipsky)
43	DF	RUS	Artyom Gyurdzhan
46	FW	RUS	Pavel Patsekin
47	FW	RUS	Aleksandr Dolgov
49	DF	RUS	Artyom Sapov
52	DF	RUS	Mikhail Tarasov
53	FW	RUS	Ivan Zhurin
54	GK	RUS	Vitali Sychyov
55	MF	RUS	Nikita Shishchenko
56	DF	MDA	Feodor Andriuhin
58	MF	RUS	Fyodor Stukalov
65	MF	RUS	Vladislav Ignatenko
73	DF	RUS	Aleksei Tatarchuk (from own academy)
75	DF	RUS	Dmitri Koltyapin
76	MF	RUS	Vladislav Karapuzov
80	DF	RUS	Erving Joe Botaka-Ioboma (from Solyaris Moscow)
81	DF	RUS	Kamil Salakhetdinov
83	MF	RUS	Aleksei Mironov
85	MF	RUS	Roman Nuriyev
87	GK	RUS	Daniil Barinov
90	FW	RUS	Gevork Sarkisyan
91	FW	RUS	Dzambolat Tsallagov
92	DF	RUS	Aleksandr Deyev
93	DF	RUS	Eduard Sholokh (from Dynamo-2 Moscow)
96	MF	RUS	Artur Chyorny

Out: Note: Flags indicate national team as defined under FIFA eligibility rules; some limited exceptions apply. Players may hold more than one non-FIFA nationality.

No.	Pos.	Nation	Player
7	MF	BRA	Maicon (to (Turkey) Antalyaspor)
9	FW	RUS	Igor Portnyagin (on loan to Ural Yekaterinburg)
10	MF	RUS	Dmitri Loskov (retired)
32	FW	SRB	Petar Škuletić (to (Turkey) Gençlerbirliği)
37	GK	RUS	Anton Shitov (to Ararat Moscow)
49	DF	RUS	Artyom Sapov
55	DF	RUS	Renat Yanbayev (to Krasnodar)
58	DF	RUS	Daniil Feoktistov (to Biolog-Novokubansk)
65	DF	RUS	Innokenti Samokhvalov (to Tekstilshchik Ivanovo)
71	GK	RUS	Maksim Bogatyryov (to Anzhi Makhachkala)
76	MF	RUS	Maksim Kalachevsky (to Spartak Moscow)
83	DF	RUS	Viktor Fereferov (to Zenit Irkutsk)
88	MF	CGO	Delvin N'Dinga (to (Turkey) Sivasspor)
91	GK	RUS	Maksim Ivashov
92	DF	RUS	Aleksandr Deyev
—	GK	RUS	Ilya Abayev (to Rostov, previously on loan to Krasnodar)
—	DF	RUS	Roman Shishkin (to Krasnodar, previously on loan)
—	FW	NGR	Ezekiel Henty (to (Hungary) Videoton, previously on loan to (United Arab Emirates) Baniyas)

=== Rostov ===
In: Note: Flags indicate national team as defined under FIFA eligibility rules; some limited exceptions apply. Players may hold more than one non-FIFA nationality.

No.	Pos.	Nation	Player
3	DF	POL	Maciej Wilusz (from (Poland) Lech Poznań)
4	DF	RUS	Sergei Parshivlyuk (from Anzhi Makhachkala)
5	DF	SLO	Matija Boben (from (Slovenia) Gorica)
7	MF	RUS	Artur Yusupov (on loan from Zenit St. Petersburg)
9	MF	RUS	Valeri Yaroshenko (end of loan to Baltika Kaliningrad)
10	MF	RUS	Aleksandr Zuyev (on loan from Spartak Moscow)
12	MF	RUS	Aleksei Ionov (from Dynamo Moscow)
14	FW	UZB	Eldor Shomurodov (from (Uzbekistan) Bunyodkor)
15	DF	ISL	Sverrir Ingi Ingason (from (Spain) Granada)
16	DF	RUS	Yevgeni Makeyev (from Spartak Moscow)
17	MF	MLI	Moussa Doumbia (end of loan to Arsenal Tula)
20	MF	SLO	Žan Majer (from (Slovenia) Domžale)
22	FW	RUS	Vladimir Dyadyun (from Rubin Kazan)
30	GK	RUS	Sergei Pesyakov (from Spartak Moscow)
31	GK	RUS	Ilya Abayev (from Lokomotiv Moscow)
41	MF	RUS	Vyacheslav Larchenkov
44	MF	ECU	Josimar Quintero (on loan from (England) Chelsea)
73	FW	RUS	Yevgeni Livadnov
81	DF	RUS	Mikhail Osinov
90	MF	RUS	Ivan Danilov
91	DF	RUS	Vitali Ustinov (on loan from Rubin Kazan)
92	MF	RUS	Igor Volkov
99	MF	RUS	Andrei Potapov (from Arsenal Tula)

Out: Note: Flags indicate national team as defined under FIFA eligibility rules; some limited exceptions apply. Players may hold more than one non-FIFA nationality.

No.	Pos.	Nation	Player
1	GK	RUS	Ivan Komissarov (to Armavir)
4	DF	RUS	Vladimir Granat (to Rubin Kazan)
5	DF	RUS	Denis Terentyev (to Zenit St. Petersburg)
6	MF	IRI	Saeid Ezatolahi (on loan to Amkar Perm, previously on loan to Anzhi Makhachkala)
8	FW	RUS	Dmitry Poloz (to Zenit St. Petersburg)
16	MF	ECU	Christian Noboa (to Zenit St. Petersburg)
20	FW	IRI	Sardar Azmoun (to Rubin Kazan)
21	DF	RUS	Andrei Sorokin (to Sakhalin Yuzhno-Sakhalinsk)
22	DF	MNE	Marko Simić (to (Uzbekistan) Pakhtakor Tashkent)
23	DF	SLO	Miha Mevlja (to Zenit St. Petersburg)
28	MF	ROU	Andrei Prepeliță
30	DF	RUS	Fyodor Kudryashov (to Rubin Kazan)
32	MF	RUS	Aleksei Stokolyasov
33	FW	UKR	Marko Dević (to (Liechtenstein) Vaduz)
35	GK	RUS	Soslan Dzhanayev (to Rubin Kazan)
43	MF	RUS	Ismail Gasanov
44	DF	ESP	César Navas (to Rubin Kazan)
45	DF	RUS	Anton Lazutkin
56	MF	RUS	Artyom Sobol (to Armavir)
69	DF	RUS	Nikita Kovalyov (to Druzhba Maykop)
73	MF	RUS	Ilya Zakharov (to Akademiya Futbola Rostov-on-Don)
77	GK	RUS	Nikita Medvedev (to Lokomotiv Moscow)
89	MF	RUS	Aleksandr Yerokhin (to Zenit St. Petersburg)
90	MF	RUS	Filipp Kondryukov (to Dynamo Stavropol)
99	MF	RUS	Roman Khodunov (to Akademiya Futbola Rostov-on-Don)
—	MF	RUS	Maksim Grigoryev (to Ural Yekaterinburg, previously on loan to Orenburg)
—	MF	RUS	Reziuan Mirzov (on loan to Tosno, from Akhmat Grozny)
—	MF	RUS	Aleksandr Troshechkin (on loan to Tosno, previously on loan to Fakel Voronezh)
—	FW	GEO	Nika Kacharava (on loan to (Poland) Korona Kielce, previously on loan to (Cyprus) Ethnikos Achna)

=== Rubin Kazan ===
In: Note: Flags indicate national team as defined under FIFA eligibility rules; some limited exceptions apply. Players may hold more than one non-FIFA nationality.

No.	Pos.	Nation	Player
5	DF	ISL	Ragnar Sigurðsson (on loan from (England) Fulham)
14	DF	RUS	Vladimir Granat (from Rostov)
27	MF	RUS	Magomed Ozdoyev (end of loan to Akhmat Grozny)
28	GK	RUS	Aleksandr Filtsov (end of loan to Anzhi Makhachkala)
30	DF	RUS	Fyodor Kudryashov (from Rostov)
33	FW	IRI	Sardar Azmoun (from Rostov)
35	GK	RUS	Soslan Dzhanayev (from Rostov)
42	DF	RUS	Amir Gavrilov
44	DF	ESP	César Navas (from Rostov)
45	FW	RUS	Kamil Mullin (end of loan to Neftekhimik Nizhnekamsk)
46	MF	RUS	Albert Sharipov (end of loan to Neftekhimik Nizhnekamsk)
56	FW	RUS	Gevorg Arutyunyan (end of loan to (Armenia) Pyunik)
77	MF	IRI	Reza Shekari (from (Iran) Zob Ahan)
80	DF	RUS	Yegor Sorokin (end of loan to Neftekhimik Nizhnekamsk)

Out: Note: Flags indicate national team as defined under FIFA eligibility rules; some limited exceptions apply. Players may hold more than one non-FIFA nationality.

No.	Pos.	Nation	Player
14	MF	RUS	Diniyar Bilyaletdinov (to (Lithuania) Trakai)
15	FW	RUS	Nikita Saprunov
19	MF	RUS	Vladimir Sobolev
22	FW	BRA	Jonathas (to (Germany) Hannover 96)
31	MF	RUS	Denis Tkachuk (to Krylia Sovetov Samara)
32	DF	RUS	Anatoli Brendelev
33	MF	RUS	Inal Getigezhev (to Orenburg)
37	MF	RUS	Adil Mukhametzyanov (to Anzhi-Yunior Zelenodolsk)
39	FW	RUS	Vladimir Dyadyun (to Rostov)
40	DF	RUS	Danis Giniyatullin (to Anzhi-Yunior Zelenodolsk)
41	DF	RUS	Sergei Doronin (on loan to Neftekhimik Nizhnekamsk)
49	DF	RUS	Vitali Ustinov (on loan to Rostov)
51	MF	RUS	Nikita Kulalayev (to Chernomorets Novorossiysk)
63	MF	RUS	Alisher Dzhalilov (to Baltika Kaliningrad)
65	MF	RUS	Erik Vasilyev
78	FW	RUS	Nikita Torgashov (to Neftekhimik Nizhnekamsk)
80	MF	RUS	Vladislav Kulik (to Orenburg)
97	FW	RUS	Dmitri Kamenshchikov (on loan to Neftekhimik Nizhnekamsk)
—	GK	RUS	Fyodor Arsentyev (to Neftekhimik Nizhnekamsk, previously on loan)
—	DF	URU	Guillermo Cotugno (to (Spain) Real Oviedo, previously on loan to (Argentina) Talleres)
—	DF	GEO	Mamuka Kobakhidze (to (Georgia (country)) Locomotive Tbilisi, previously on loan to Neftekhimik Nizhnekamsk)
—	DF	GEO	Solomon Kvirkvelia (to Lokomotiv Moscow, previously on loan)
—	FW	ESP	Samu (to (Spain) Levante, previously on loan to (Spain) Leganés)

=== SKA-Khabarovsk ===
In: Note: Flags indicate national team as defined under FIFA eligibility rules; some limited exceptions apply. Players may hold more than one non-FIFA nationality.

No.	Pos.	Nation	Player
4	DF	RUS	Maksim Tishkin (from Baltika Kaliningrad)
5	DF	RUS	Aleksandr Putsko (on loan from Ufa)
6	MF	RUS	Pavel Karasyov (on loan from Anzhi Makhachkala)
7	MF	ARG	Alejandro Barbaro (from (Cyprus) Apollon Limassol)
8	MF	RUS	Georgy Gabulov (from Orenburg)
11	FW	SRB	Miroslav Marković (from (Czech Republic) Bohemians 1905)
15	DF	RUS	Yevgeni Balyaikin (from Tom Tomsk)
19	MF	UKR	Vitaliy Fedotov (from (Latvia) Riga)
37	DF	UKR	Dmytro Hryshko (from (Ukraine) Olimpik Donetsk)
41	GK	RUS	Vyacheslav Agafonov
42	DF	RUS	Kirill Arshansky
43	DF	RUS	Kirill Blokhin
45	MF	RUS	Artyom Bobrovsky
46	MF	RUS	Andrei Golovatyuk
47	DF	RUS	Artur Gulm
48	MF	RUS	Mikhail Degtyaryov
49	DF	RUS	Aleksei Kuchin
51	MF	RUS	Aleksandr Lomachenko
52	DF	RUS	Denis Lyubimov
54	GK	RUS	Aleksandr Mitrofanov
56	MF	RUS	Yegor Golovashkin
57	MF	RUS	Nikita Zotov
58	DF	RUS	Stepan Safronov
60	DF	RUS	Ilya Kalinin
61	MF	RUS	Roman Slesarev (from Smena Komsomolsk-na-Amure)
62	MF	RUS	Igor Stepanenko
63	MF	RUS	Kirill Tsaryov
65	MF	RUS	Ilya Bryukhanov
77	MF	RUS	Konstantin Savichev (from Spartak Moscow)
88	DF	GEO	Giorgi Navalovski (from (Azerbaijan) Neftçi)
91	FW	BUL	Ventsislav Hristov (from (Bulgaria) Neftochimic Burgas)
92	MF	RUS	Dmitri Mungalov
96	MF	RUS	Aleksandr Maksimenko
97	MF	RUS	Manvel Agaronyan (end of loan to Smena Komsomolsk-na-Amure)

Out: Note: Flags indicate national team as defined under FIFA eligibility rules; some limited exceptions apply. Players may hold more than one non-FIFA nationality.

No.	Pos.	Nation	Player
2	DF	RUS	Anton Kupchin
4	MF	RUS	Maksim Astafyev (end of loan from Mordovia Saransk)
6	MF	RUS	Pavel Karasyov (to Anzhi Makhachkala)
11	FW	RUS	Eduard Buliya (to Shinnik Yaroslavl)
15	DF	LTU	Tomas Mikuckis (to Tom Tomsk)
17	MF	RUS	Aleksandr Verulidze (to Fakel Voronezh)
19	MF	RUS	Vasili Pletin (to Smena Komsomolsk-na-Amure)
22	FW	RUS	Anton Kobyalko (to Baltika Kaliningrad)
23	FW	ARG	Juan Lescano (to Anzhi Makhachkala)
33	DF	RUS	Igor Udaly (to Anzhi Makhachkala)
35	MF	RUS	Artur Rylov (to Rotor Volgograd)
59	DF	RUS	Andrei Ivanov (to Torpedo Moscow)
77	DF	RUS	David Ozmanov (to Sokol Saratov)
88	DF	RUS	Andrei Kireyev (to Rotor Volgograd)
—	DF	RUS	Nikolai Radchenko (to Nosta Novotroitsk, previously on loan to Tyumen)

=== Spartak Moscow ===
In: Note: Flags indicate national team as defined under FIFA eligibility rules; some limited exceptions apply. Players may hold more than one non-FIFA nationality.

No.	Pos.	Nation	Player
3	DF	SRB	Marko Petković (from (Serbia) Red Star Belgrade)
17	DF	RUS	Georgi Tigiyev (from Anzhi Makhachkala, previously on loan)
36	DF	RUS	Artyom Voropayev (from Lada-Togliatti)
50	MF	CRO	Mario Pašalić (on loan from (England) Chelsea)
52	MF	RUS	Ivan Repyakh
53	DF	RUS	Artyom Gorbulin (from Dynamo-2 Moscow)
54	MF	RUS	Nikita Bakalyuk
67	DF	RUS	Maksim Sazonov (from own academy)
74	FW	RUS	Dmitri Markitesov
76	MF	RUS	Maksim Kalachevsky (from Lokomotiv Moscow)
78	DF	RUS	Pavel Lelyukhin (on loan from Dynamo-2 Moscow)
85	GK	RUS	Vlad Yeleferenko (from own academy)
89	MF	RUS	Dmitri Mitroga
91	GK	RUS	Daniil Markov
99	MF	BRA	Pedro Rocha (from (Brazil) Grêmio)

Out: Note: Flags indicate national team as defined under FIFA eligibility rules; some limited exceptions apply. Players may hold more than one non-FIFA nationality.

No.	Pos.	Nation	Player
1	GK	RUS	Sergei Pesyakov (to Rostov)
29	MF	RUS	Daniil Gorovykh (to Veles Moscow)
30	GK	RUS	Mikhail Filippov (to Yenisey Krasnoyarsk)
33	DF	BRA	Maurício (end of loan from (Italy) Lazio)
34	DF	RUS	Yevgeni Makeyev (to Rostov)
37	MF	RUS	Georgi Melkadze (on loan to Tosno)
39	MF	RUS	Ippey Sinodzuka (to (Japan) Yokohama F. Marinos)
59	MF	RUS	Nazar Gordeochuk (to Chayka Peschanokopskoye)
64	DF	RUS	Denis Kutin (on loan to Tosno)
67	FW	RUS	Artyom Fedchuk (to Avangard Kursk)
74	MF	RUS	Nikita Kiselyov
76	DF	RUS	Ivan Kostylev (to Spartak Kostroma)
77	MF	RUS	Konstantin Savichev (to SKA-Khabarovsk)
89	MF	RUS	Vladlen Babayev (to Volgar Astrakhan)
—	MF	RUS	Aleksandr Zuyev (on loan to Rostov, previously on loan to Krylia Sovetov Samara)

=== Tosno ===
In: Note: Flags indicate national team as defined under FIFA eligibility rules; some limited exceptions apply. Players may hold more than one non-FIFA nationality.

No.	Pos.	Nation	Player
1	GK	RUS	Mikhail Oparin (from Yenisey Krasnoyarsk)
3	DF	RUS	Aslan Dudiyev (from Anzhi Makhachkala)
10	MF	RUS	Georgi Melkadze (on loan from Spartak Moscow)
13	DF	RUS	Vitali Shakhov (from Fakel Voronezh)
14	MF	BLR	Alyaksandr Karnitsky (from (Belarus) Gomel)
15	MF	CPV	Nuno Rocha (from (Romania) Universitatea Craiova)
16	GK	RUS	David Yurchenko (from Anzhi Makhachkala)
22	MF	RUS	Reziuan Mirzov (on loan from Rostov)
23	MF	RUS	Aleksandr Troshechkin (on loan from Rostov)
27	MF	BRA	Anderson Carvalho (from (Portugal) Boavista)
28	DF	RUS	Yevgeni Chernov (on loan from Zenit St. Petersburg)
30	GK	BLR	Alyaksandr Hutar (from Orenburg)
34	MF	RUS	Vladimir Bystrov (from Krasnodar)
62	MF	RUS	Vyacheslav Zinovyev (from FShM-2 Moscow)
63	DF	RUS	Irakli Badzagua
64	DF	RUS	Denis Kutin (on loan from Spartak Moscow)
65	DF	RUS	Pavel Vishnevsky
67	DF	RUS	Aleksei Beryozkin
69	MF	RUS	Daniil Garibov
70	DF	RUS	Ilya Vasilyev
71	FW	RUS	Yevgeni Senin
72	FW	RUS	Stepan Kostyukov (from Spartak Moscow academy)
73	MF	RUS	Ivan Shkipin
74	MF	RUS	Nikita Kovalyov
76	MF	RUS	Stanislav Manayev
77	MF	SRB	Nikola Trujić (from (Serbia) Vojvodina)
78	MF	RUS	Nikita Shumeyko
79	MF	RUS	Vyacheslav Kozlov
81	GK	RUS	Ivan Tikhonov
82	MF	RUS	Ivan Ignatenko
83	DF	RUS	Artyom Lavrenenko (from Zvezda St. Petersburg)
84	DF	RUS	Nikita Olishevsky
85	GK	RUS	Vasili Fedosov
86	MF	RUS	Ivan Kuznetsov
87	FW	RUS	Yuri Yartsev
88	MF	SRB	Marko Poletanović (from (Belgium) Gent)
89	MF	RUS	Artak Abraamyan (own youth)
91	MF	RUS	Yan Kazayev (from Khimki)
92	MF	RUS	Konstantin Kolyushko
93	DF	RUS	Pavel Kaloshin (from FSC Dolgoprudny-2)
95	DF	RUS	Kirill Kuznetsov
96	DF	RUS	Dmitri Smirnov
98	MF	RUS	Vladislav Kochnov
99	MF	RUS	Sergei Ryabinin
—	FW	CRO	Ante Vukušić (from (Germany) Greuther Fürth)

Out: Note: Flags indicate national team as defined under FIFA eligibility rules; some limited exceptions apply. Players may hold more than one non-FIFA nationality.

No.	Pos.	Nation	Player
1	GK	RUS	Eduard Baychora (to Khimki)
5	DF	RUS	Aleksei Aravin (to Sibir Novosibirsk)
11	MF	RUS	Aleksandr Makarov (end of loan from CSKA Moscow)
15	DF	RUS	Arseny Logashov (to Baltika Kaliningrad)
16	MF	RUS	Ilnur Alshin (on loan to Avangard Kursk)
18	MF	MNE	Mladen Kašćelan (to Tambov)
19	DF	RUS	Konstantin Garbuz (to Yenisey Krasnoyarsk)
22	GK	RUS	Artur Nigmatullin (to Amkar Perm)
30	GK	BLR	Alyaksandr Hutar
48	FW	RUS	Aleksandr Kutyin (to Yenisey Krasnoyarsk)
70	FW	RUS	Dmitri Bogayev (end of loan from (Lithuania) Palanga)
75	FW	UKR	Artem Milevskyi (to (Belarus) Dinamo Brest)
76	FW	RUS	Pavel Kireyenko (end of loan from (Lithuania) Palanga)
86	MF	RUS	Grigori Chirkin (to Orenburg)
97	DF	RUS	Denis Nikitin (on loan to Orenburg, then on loan to Avangard Kursk)
—	GK	RUS	Denis Kniga (to Dynamo St. Petersburg, previously on loan to Neftekhimik Nizhnekamsk)
—	MF	RUS	Nika Chkhapeliya (to Fakel Voronezh, previously on loan to Spartak Nalchik)
—	MF	UKR	Stanislav Prychynenko (to Baltika Kaliningrad, previously on loan)

=== Ufa ===
In: Note: Flags indicate national team as defined under FIFA eligibility rules; some limited exceptions apply. Players may hold more than one non-FIFA nationality.

No.	Pos.	Nation	Player
1	GK	RUS	Aleksei Chernov (from Kaluga)
6	MF	SUI	Vero Salatić (from (Switzerland) Sion)
55	DF	GEO	Jemal Tabidze (from (Belgium) Gent)
80	MF	RUS	Arseni Zdorovets

Out: Note: Flags indicate national team as defined under FIFA eligibility rules; some limited exceptions apply. Players may hold more than one non-FIFA nationality.

No.	Pos.	Nation	Player
1	GK	RUS	Mikhail Borodko (to Olimpiyets Nizhny Novgorod)
2	DF	UKR	Oleksandr Filin (to Olimpiyets Nizhny Novgorod)
45	DF	RUS	Aleksandr Putsko (on loan to SKA-Khabarovsk)
56	GK	RUS	Igor Ozhiganov
96	FW	RUS	Nikita Tikhonov
—	MF	RUS	Andrei Batyutin (on loan to Dynamo St. Petersburg, previously on loan to Zenit-2 St. Petersburg)
—	MF	RUS	Maksim Semakin (to Yenisey Krasnoyarsk, previously on loan)

=== Ural Yekaterinburg ===
In: Note: Flags indicate national team as defined under FIFA eligibility rules; some limited exceptions apply. Players may hold more than one non-FIFA nationality.

No.	Pos.	Nation	Player
3	DF	ARM	Varazdat Haroyan (from (Iran) Padideh)
13	MF	CMR	Petrus Boumal (from (Bulgaria) CSKA Sofia)
14	MF	RUS	Yuri Bavin (from Zenit St. Petersburg)
20	MF	RUS	Maksim Grigoryev (from Rostov)
28	DF	RUS	Nikita Chernov (on loan from CSKA Moscow)
31	GK	UKR	Yaroslav Hodzyur (from Akhmat Grozny)
39	MF	RUS	Savva Knyazev
41	FW	RUS	Vladislav Pavlyuchenko (from Progress Timashyovsk)
42	FW	RUS	Nikita Belous (from Urozhay Yelan)
58	MF	UKR	Dmytro Bilonoh (end of loan to (Ukraine) Zirka Kropyvnytskyi)
61	MF	RUS	Dmitry Makovsky
64	MF	RUS	Pavel Kobzev (from Urozhay Yelan)
65	MF	RUS	Aleksandr Galimov
67	MF	RUS	Nikita Arsenyev (from Orenburg)
74	DF	RUS	Aleksandr Kashkarov
78	MF	RUS	Semyon Pomogayev (from Baltika Kaliningrad)
81	DF	RUS	Ilya Nekrasov
88	FW	RUS	Igor Portnyagin (on loan from Lokomotiv Moscow)
94	MF	RUS	Alexey Yevseyev (from Zenit St. Petersburg)
95	MF	RUS	Andrei Tushkov

Out: Note: Flags indicate national team as defined under FIFA eligibility rules; some limited exceptions apply. Players may hold more than one non-FIFA nationality.

No.	Pos.	Nation	Player
3	DF	GEO	Jemal Tabidze (end of loan from (Belgium) Gent)
9	FW	RUS	Roman Pavlyuchenko (to Ararat Moscow)
10	MF	ZAM	Chisamba Lungu (to (Turkey) Alanyaspor)
12	MF	RUS	Aleksandr Novikov (to Yenisey Krasnoyarsk)
13	DF	SRB	Radovan Pankov (on loan to (Cyprus) AEK Larnaca)
14	FW	CIV	Jean-Jacques Bougouhi (to (Finland) HJK)
20	MF	RUS	Maksim Grigoryev
25	MF	RUS	Aleksandr Stavpets (on loan to Tyumen)
28	GK	RUS	Nikolai Zabolotny
33	MF	RUS	Vartan Karkaryan
41	DF	RUS	Aleksei Gerasimov (on loan to Tom Tomsk)
50	MF	RUS	Grigori Senatorov
51	DF	RUS	Roman Shalin
58	FW	RUS	Bogdan Mishukov (to (Portugal) Leixões)
65	MF	RUS	Dmitri Khlyoskin
67	MF	RUS	Nikita Arsenyev (to Inkomsport-Avangard Yalta)
70	MF	RUS	Osman Suleymanov
74	DF	RUS	Danil Chernov (to Titan Klin)
77	MF	RUS	Dmitri Korobov (on loan to Avangard Kursk)
79	FW	RUS	Artyom Yusupov (on loan to Tyumen)
80	MF	RUS	Aleksandr Lomakin (on loan to Yenisey Krasnoyarsk)
82	MF	RUS	Sergei Podoksyonov (on loan to Zenit Penza)
85	MF	RUS	Sergei Serchenkov (on loan to Orenburg)
87	MF	RUS	Rustam Nisafutdinov (to Ural-2 Yekaterinburg)
93	FW	RUS	Lev Popov
97	MF	RUS	Aleksei Gontsa
—	DF	RUS	Ivan Chudin (to Tyumen, previously on loan)

=== Zenit Saint Petersburg ===
In: Note: Flags indicate national team as defined under FIFA eligibility rules; some limited exceptions apply. Players may hold more than one non-FIFA nationality.

No.	Pos.	Nation	Player
3	DF	RUS	Denis Terentyev (from Rostov)
5	MF	ARG	Leandro Paredes (from (Italy) Roma)
7	FW	RUS	Dmitry Poloz (from Rostov)
8	MF	ARG	Matías Kranevitter (from (Spain) Atlético Madrid)
10	MF	ARG	Emiliano Rigoni (from (Argentina) Independiente)
11	FW	ARG	Sebastián Driussi (from (Argentina) River Plate)
14	MF	RUS	Daler Kuzyayev (from Akhmat Grozny)
16	MF	ECU	Christian Noboa (from Rostov)
21	MF	RUS	Aleksandr Yerokhin (from Rostov)
23	DF	SLO	Miha Mevlja (from Rostov)
30	DF	ARG	Emanuel Mammana (from (France) Lyon)
31	GK	RUS	Mikhail Ponomarenko
32	FW	RUS	Nikolai Prudnikov (from Chertanovo Moscow)
33	FW	RUS	Andrei Panyukov (from (Lithuania) Atlantas)
41	GK	RUS	Mikhail Kerzhakov (end of loan to Orenburg)
52	DF	RUS	Andrei Anisimov
55	MF	BLR	Kirill Kaplenko (from own academy)
63	DF	RUS	Maksim Smirnov
65	FW	RUS	Maksim Bachinsky
67	MF	RUS	Nikita Andreyev (end of loan to (Slovakia) VSS Košice)
72	DF	RUS	Anton Sinyak
74	MF	RUS	Sergei Ivanov (end of loan to (Slovakia) VSS Košice)
75	MF	RUS	Ivan Andreyev
80	DF	RUS	Ilya Skrobotov (from own academy)
81	MF	LAT	Vladislavs Soloveičiks (from (Latvia) RTU)
82	FW	RUS	Ivan Tarasov (from own academy)
84	FW	RUS	Ilya Vorobyov
88	FW	RUS	Dmitri Bogayev (from (Lithuania) Palanga)
90	FW	RUS	Yefrem Vartanyan (end of loan to (Slovakia) VSS Košice)
90	DF	RUS	Stanislav Utkin
94	FW	RUS	Nikita Povarov
96	DF	RUS	Tomas Rukas (from (Portugal) União de Leiria)

Out: Note: Flags indicate national team as defined under FIFA eligibility rules; some limited exceptions apply. Players may hold more than one non-FIFA nationality.

No.	Pos.	Nation	Player
5	MF	RUS	Aleksandr Ryazantsev (on loan to Amkar Perm)
6	DF	BEL	Nicolas Lombaerts (to (Belgium) Oostende)
6	MF	ESP	Javi García (to (Spain) Real Betis)
8	MF	BRA	Maurício (to (Greece) PAOK)
10	MF	POR	Danny (to (Czech Republic) Slavia Prague)
10	MF	BRA	Giuliano (to (Turkey) Fenerbahçe)
11	FW	RUS	Aleksandr Kerzhakov (retired)
13	DF	POR	Luís Neto (on loan to (Turkey) Fenerbahçe)
14	MF	RUS	Artur Yusupov (on loan to Rostov)
15	DF	RUS	Ibragim Tsallagov (on loan to Dynamo Moscow)
23	DF	RUS	Yevgeni Chernov (on loan to Tosno)
24	MF	FRA	Yohan Mollo (to (England) Fulham)
23	MF	BRA	Hernani (on loan to (France) Saint-Étienne)
25	MF	RUS	Aleksei Isayev (on loan to Yenisey Krasnoyarsk)
27	DF	RUS	Sergei Zuykov (on loan to Tom Tomsk)
29	MF	SVK	Róbert Mak (on loan to (Greece) PAOK)
32	DF	RUS	David Mildzikhov (to Yenisey Krasnoyarsk)
34	FW	RUS	Maximilian Pronichev (to (Germany) Hertha BSC II)
39	FW	RUS	Vasili Zapryagayev
40	MF	RUS	Yuri Bavin (to Ural Yekaterinburg)
45	DF	RUS	Kirill Kostin (to Dynamo St. Petersburg)
52	GK	RUS	Nodari Kalichava (to Lokomotiv Saint Petersburg)
55	MF	RUS	Konstantin Lobov (retired)
65	MF	RUS	Danila Yashchuk (to Kuban Krasnodar)
72	DF	RUS	Stanislav Mareyev (to Irtysh Omsk)
75	DF	RUS	Temur Mustafin (to Fakel Voronezh)
77	FW	MNE	Luka Đorđević (on loan to Arsenal Tula)
80	GK	RUS	Mikhail Mzhelsky (to Anzhi-Yunior Zelenodolsk)
84	DF	RUS	Feliks Shalimov (to Dynamo-2 St. Petersburg)
87	DF	RUS	Artyom Vyatkin (on loan to (Croatia) Novigrad)
88	FW	RUS	Beni Yunayev
90	FW	RUS	Yefrem Vartanyan (to Dynamo St. Petersburg)
94	MF	RUS	Alexey Yevseyev (to Ural Yekaterinburg)
98	FW	RUS	Kirill Pogrebnyak (to Baltika Kaliningrad)
—	DF	RUS	Andrei Ivanov (to Tom Tomsk, previously on loan to Mordovia Saransk)
—	DF	SRB	Vukašin Jovanović (to (France) Bordeaux, previously on loan)
