= 2017–18 FC Zenit-2 Saint Petersburg season =

FC Zenit-2 St. Petersburg
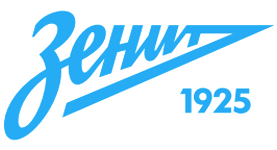
- Full name: Football Club Zenit-2 Saint Petersburg
- Nickname: The blues
- Founded: 2001, 2013
- Ground: MSA Petrovskiy, Saint Petersburg
- Capacity: 2,809
- Owner: Gazprombank
- Chairman: Sergey Fursenko
- Manager: Anatoli Davydov
- League: Russian Football National League
- 2017–18: TBA
Home colours	Away colours

FC Zenit-2 Saint Petersburg (Russian: ФК «Зенит-2» Санкт-Петербург) is a Russian football team from Saint Petersburg. During the 2017-18 campaign they will be competing in the following competitions: Russian National Football League.

== Russian National Football League ==
=== Results summary ===
Overall								Home						Away					
Pld	W	D	L	GF	GA	GD	Pts	W	D	L	GF	GA	GD	W	D	L	GF	GA	GD
24	5	6	13	32	41	−9	21	5	1	5	18	14	+4	0	5	8	14	27	−13

Last updated: 19 November 2017.

=== Results by matchday ===
Matchday	1	2	3	4	5	6	7	8	9	10	11	12	13	14	15	16	17	18	19	20	21	22	23	24	25	26	27	28	29	30	31	32	33	34	35	36	37	38
Ground	A	H	A	H	A	H	A	H	A	A	H	A	H	A	H	A	H	A	H	A	H	A	H	A	H	A	H	H	A	H	A	H	A	H	A	H	A	H
Result	L	L	D	W	L	L	L	W	L	D	W	L	D	D	W	L	W	D	L	D	L	L	L	L														
Position	17	17	17	17	17	17	17	17	17	15	14	14	14	15	15	16	16	16	18	18	18	18	18	18														

Updated to match(es) played on 19 November 2017. Source:
A = Away; H = Home; W = Win; D = Draw; L = Loss

== Matches ==
8 July 2017 Match 1	Shinnik	2 - 1	Zenit-2 Saint Petersburg	Karavaevo
15:00	Bezlikhotnov 27'; Chistyakov 43'; Zhestokov (yellow card) 69'	Summary	Prudnikov 53'	Stadium: Stadion Urozhaj; Attendance: 5,000; Referee: (Russia) Vladimir Seldyakov

16 July 2017 Match 2	Zenit-2 Saint Petersburg	0 - 1	Dynamo Saint Petersburg	Saint Petersburg
18:00	Zuykov (yellow card) 51'; Gorulyov (yellow card) 87'	Summary	Kulishev 47'; Pesegov (yellow card) 66'; Solovyov (yellow card) 90'; Generalov (yellow card) 90+1'	Stadium: Malaya Sportivnaya Arena; Attendance: 1,228; Referee: (Russia) Lasha Verulidze

22 July 2017 Match 3	Tyumen	2 - 2	Zenit-2 Saint Petersburg	Tyumen
16:00	Chudin 49'; Shakuro (yellow card) 53'; Makoyev 80'	Report	Gorulyov (yellow card) 28'; Nekrasov 46'; Prudnikov 47'	Stadium: Geolog Stadium; Attendance: 2,000; Referee: (Russia) Pavel Kukuyan

26 July 2017 Match 4	Zenit-2 Saint Petersburg	2 - 1	FC Sibir Novosibirsk	Saint Petersburg
20:00	Krugovoy 49'; Musayev (yellow card) 52'; Kamyshev (yellow card) 64'; Andreyev 89'		Zhitnev 66' (pen.)	Stadium: Malaya Sportivnaya Arena; Attendance: 540; Referee: (Russia) Yury Aponasenko

30 July 2017 Match 5	Orenburg	1 - 0	Zenit-2 Saint Petersburg	Orenburg
19:00	Ďuriš 27'	Report		Stadium: Gazovik Stadium; Attendance: 2,264; Referee: (Russia) Stanislav Vasilyev

5 August 2017 Match 6	Zenit-2 Saint Petersburg	0 - 1	Tambov	Saint Petersburg
17:00	Zuyev (yellow card) 45+1'; Krugovoy (yellow card) 70'	Report	Chasovskikh 43'; Gultyayev (yellow card) 54'	Stadium: Malaya Sportivnaya Arena; Attendance: 515; Referee: (Russia) Artem Chistyakov
