= Dynamo Saint Petersburg =

Dynamo Saint Petersburg may refer to:

- BC Dynamo Saint Petersburg, a basketball team
- FC Dynamo Saint Petersburg, a football club
- HC Dinamo Saint Petersburg, a hockey team
- JHC Dinamo Saint Petersburg, a team in the Junior Hockey League (Russia)

== See also ==
- FC Dynamo-2 Saint Petersburg, a football club
