= Andrei Shustov =

Russian footballer

Personal information
- Full name: Andrei Eduardovich Shustov
- Date of birth: 4 May 1998 (age 28)
- Place of birth: Moscow, Russia
- Height: 1.78 m (5 ft 10 in)
- Position: Defender

Youth career
- –2011: FC Nika Moscow
- 2011: Yunost Moskvy-Torpedo Moscow
- 2011–2015: Chertanovo Education Center

Senior career*
Years	Team	Apps	(Gls)
2016	FC Solyaris-M Moscow		
2016	FShM Moscow (amateur)		
2017	FC Chertanovo-M Moscow		
2017–2018	FC Arsenal Tula	0	(0)
2019–2020	FC Mordovia Saransk	4	(0)
- * Club domestic league appearances and goals

Andrei Eduardovich Shustov (Russian: Андрей Эдуардович Шустов; born 4 May 1998) is a Russian former football player.

== Club career ==
He made his debut in the Russian Football National League for FC Mordovia Saransk on 24 July 2019 in a game against FC Torpedo Moscow.
