= Aleksandr Yerokhin =

Russian footballer (born 1989)

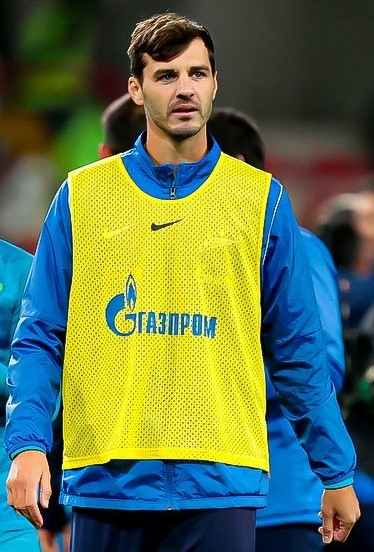
- Yerokhin with Zenit in 2022

Personal information
- Full name: Aleksandr Yuryevich Yerokhin
- Date of birth: 13 October 1989 (age 37)
- Place of birth: Barnaul, Russian SFSR, Soviet Union
- Height: 1.95 m (6 ft 5 in)
- Position: Midfielder

Team information
- Current team: Zenit St. Petersburg
- Number: 21

Youth career
- 1997–2004: Dynamo Barnaul
- 2004–2007: Lokomotiv Moscow

Senior career*
Years	Team	Apps	(Gls)
2007–2010	Sheriff Tiraspol	80	(30)
2011–2013	Krasnodar	19	(1)
2013	→ SKA-Energiya Khabarovsk (loan)	9	(2)
2013–2014	SKA-Energiya Khabarovsk	0	(0)
2013–2014	→ Ural Yekaterinburg (loan)	25	(2)
2014–2016	Ural Yekaterinburg	37	(10)
2016–2017	Rostov	36	(6)
2017–	Zenit Saint Petersburg	194	(34)

International career^{‡}
2008	Russia U-19	9	(3)
2011	Russia-2	2	(0)
2016–2021	Russia	32	(4)
- * Club domestic league appearances and goals as of 5 September 2026 ‡ National team caps and goals as of 11 November 2021

Aleksandr Yuryevich Yerokhin (Russian: Александр Юрьевич Ерохин, IPA: [ɐlʲɪˈksandr ˈjʉrʲjɪvʲɪtɕ jɪˈroxʲɪn]; born 13 October 1989) is a Russian professional footballer who plays as an attacking midfielder for Zenit St. Petersburg.

== Career ==
=== Club ===
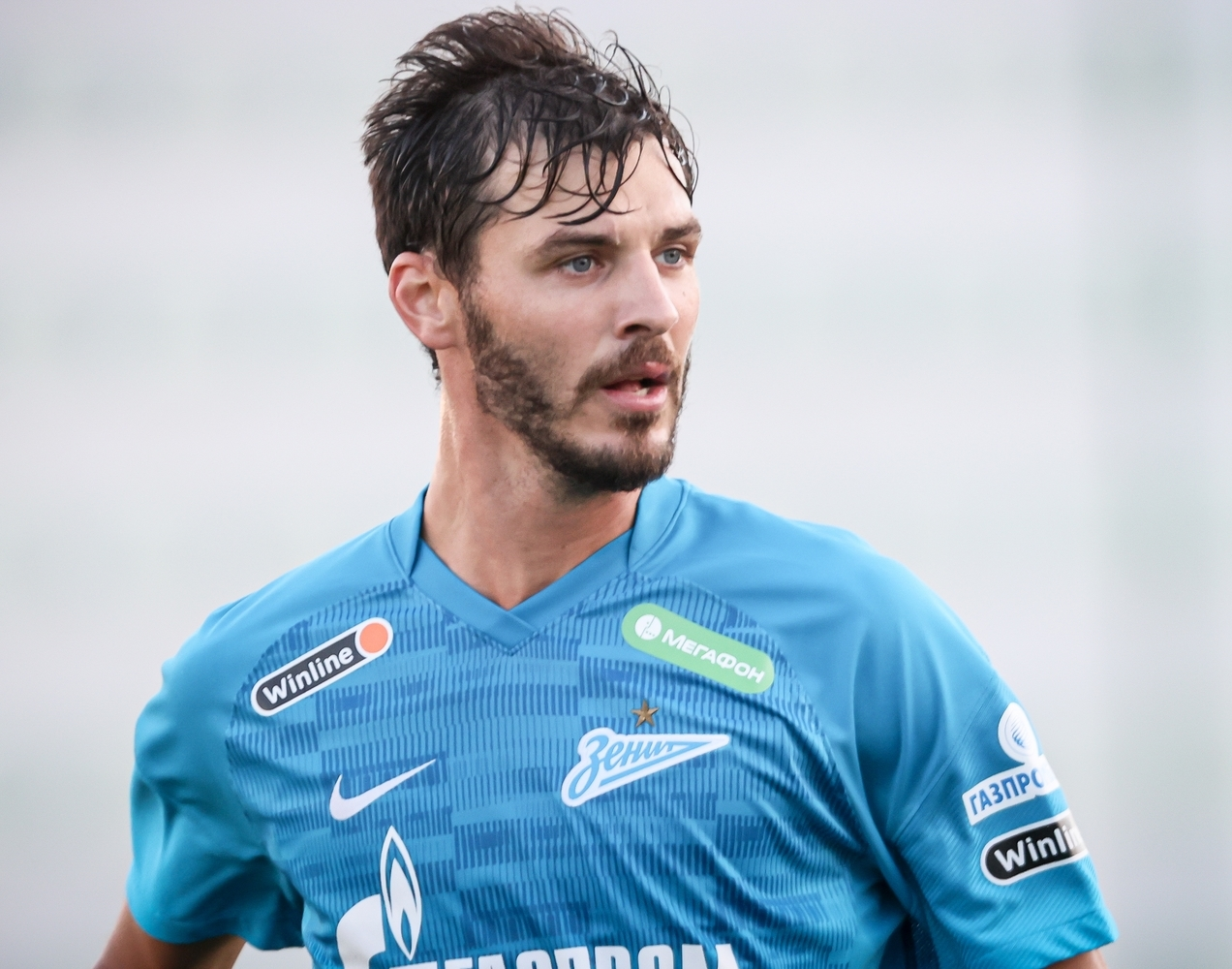
Yerokhin with Zenit in 2022

Yerokhin grew up in the youth system of FC Lokomotiv Moscow. In 2008, he signed for FC Sheriff Tiraspol, playing a few matches for the club that season. By the 2009 season, he had become a first‑team player and took on the role of playmaker.

On 28 June 2017, he signed a three‑year contract with FC Zenit Saint Petersburg. On the last day of the 2017–18 season, he scored four goals in a 6–0 victory over FC SKA-Khabarovsk.

On 7 April 2022, Yerokhin signed a new contract with Zenit, keeping him at the club until the end of the 2023–24 season.

On 1 July 2024, Yerokhin extended his contract with Zenit for one season. He extended his Zenit contract for the 2026–27 season on 2 June 2026.

=== International ===
Yerokhin was called up to the Russia national football team in August 2015 for the UEFA Euro 2016 qualifiers against Sweden and Liechtenstein. He made his debut for the team on 31 August 2016 in a friendly against Turkey.

On 11 May 2018, he was included in Russia's extended 2018 FIFA World Cup squad. On 3 June 2018, he was named in the final World Cup squad. He did not make any appearances in the group stage but became the first player to be used as a fourth substitute during extra time when he came on in the round‑of‑16 match against Spain. He also appeared as a substitute in the quarter‑final shoot‑out loss to Croatia.

== Career statistics ==
=== Club ===
As of match played 14 October 2026

Appearances and goals by club, season and competition
Club	Season	League			National Cup		Europe		Other		Total	
Club	Season	Division	Apps	Goals	Apps	Goals	Apps	Goals	Apps	Goals	Apps	Goals
Sheriff Tiraspol	2007–08	Divizia Națională	7	2	0	0	0	0	0	0	7	2
Sheriff Tiraspol	2008–09	Divizia Națională	27	11	0	0	4 (Note: Appearances in UEFA Champions League)	1	—		31	12
Sheriff Tiraspol	2009–10	Divizia Națională	28	11	0	0	8 (Note: Two appearances in the UEFA Champions League, one appearance in the UEFA Europa League)	0	—		36	11
Sheriff Tiraspol	2010–11	Divizia Națională	18	6	0	0	11 (Note: Five appearances and one goal in UEFA Champions League, six appearances and two goals in UEFA Europa League)	3	—		29	9
Sheriff Tiraspol	Total		80	30	0	0	23	4	0	0	103	34
Krasnodar	2011–12	Russian Premier League	17	1	2	1	—		—		19	2
Krasnodar	2012–13	Russian Premier League	2	0	1	1	—		—		3	1
Krasnodar	Total		19	1	3	2	0	0	0	0	22	3
SKA-Khabarovsk (loan)	2012–13	Russian Football National League	9	2	0	0	—		2 (Note: Appearances in promotion play-offs)	0	11	2
Ural (loan)	2013–14	Russian Premier League	25	2	1	0	—		—		26	2
Ural	2014–15	Russian Premier League	25	6	1	0	—		0	0	26	6
Ural	2015–16	Russian Premier League	12	4	2	0	—		—		14	4
Ural	Total		62	12	4	0	0	0	0	0	66	12
Rostov	2015–16	Russian Premier League	11	2	0	0	—		—		11	2
Rostov	2016–17	Russian Premier League	25	4	0	0	13 (Note: Nine appearances in UEFA Champions League, four appearances in UEFA Europa League)	1	—		38	5
Rostov	Total		36	6	0	0	13	1	0	0	49	7
Zenit St.Petersburg	2017–18	Russian Premier League	27	7	0	0	12 (Note: Appearances in UEFA Europa League)	1	—		39	8
Zenit St.Petersburg	2018–19	Russian Premier League	16	6	1	0	9	0	—		26	6
Zenit St.Petersburg	2019–20	Russian Premier League	23	2	2	1	4	0	1 (Note: Appearances in Russian Super Cup)	0	30	3
Zenit St.Petersburg	2020–21	Russian Premier League	25	7	1	0	5	1	1	0	32	8
Zenit St.Petersburg	2021–22	Russian Premier League	28	7	2	1	8 (Note: Six appearances in UEFA Champions League, two appearances in UEFA Europa League)	0	1	1	39	9
Zenit St.Petersburg	2022–23	Russian Premier League	20	2	6	0	—		1	0	27	2
Zenit St.Petersburg	2023–24	Russian Premier League	18	0	9	1	—		0	0	27	1
Zenit St.Petersburg	2024–25	Russian Premier League	20	2	10	3	—		0	0	30	5
Zenit St.Petersburg	2025–26	Russian Premier League	14	1	8	3	—		—		22	4
Zenit St.Petersburg	2026–27	Russian Premier League	3	0	4	1	—		—		7	1
Zenit St.Petersburg	Total		194	34	43	10	38	2	4	1	279	47
Career total			400	85	50	12	74	7	6	1	530	105

=== International ===
Russia
Year	Apps	Goals
2016	4	0
2017	11	0
2018	8	1
2019	1	0
2020	2	0
2021	6	3
Total	32	4

Statistics accurate as of match played 11 November 2021

=== International goals ===
As of 11 November 2021 (Russia score listed first, score column indicates score after each Yerokhin goal)

No.	Date	Venue	Opponent	Score	Result	Competition
1.	10 September 2018	Rostov Arena, Rostov-on-Don, Russia	Czech Republic	4–1	5–1	Friendly
2.	4 September 2021	GSP Stadium, Strovolos, Cyprus	Cyprus	1–0	2–0	2022 FIFA World Cup qualification
3.	11 November 2021	Krestovsky Stadium, Saint Petersburg, Russia	Cyprus	1–0	6–0	2022 FIFA World Cup qualification
4.	11 November 2021	Krestovsky Stadium, Saint Petersburg, Russia	Cyprus	6–0	6–0	2022 FIFA World Cup qualification

== Honors ==
=== Club ===
FC Sheriff Tiraspol

- Moldovan National Division:
  - 2008, 2009, 2010
- Moldovan Cup:
  - 2008, 2009
- CIS Cup:
  - 2009

Zenit Saint Petersburg

- Russian Premier League: 2018–19, 2019–20, 2020–21, 2021–22, 2022–23, 2023–24, 2025–26
- Russian Cup: 2019–20, 2023–24
- Russian Super Cup: 2020, 2021, 2022, 2023, 2024, 2026

=== Individual ===
- CIS Cup top scorer:
  - 2009 (shared)
