= Vladislav Molchan =

Russian footballer (born 2000)

Personal information
- Full name: Vladislav Igorevich Molchan
- Date of birth: 21 September 2000 (age 26)
- Place of birth: Saint Petersburg, Russia
- Height: 1.89 m (6 ft 2 in)
- Position: Defender

Team information
- Current team: Caen
- Number: 5

Youth career
- 2018–2020: Zenit Saint Petersburg

Senior career*
Years	Team	Apps	(Gls)
2018	Zenit-2 Saint-Petersburg	4	(0)
2020	Yenisey Krasnoyarsk	3	(0)
2020–	Caen	0	(0)
2021–	Caen B	28	(1)
- * Club domestic league appearances and goals as of 27 June 2024

Vladislav Igorevich Molchan (Russian: Владислав Игоревич Молчан; born 21 September 2000) is a Russian professional footballer who plays as a defender for Ligue 2 club Caen.

== Career ==
=== Early career ===
Molchan is a product of Zenit Saint Petersburg's academy. He was the captain of the U19 team of the club, and played two UEFA Youth League matches during the 2019–20 season.

Molchan made his debut in the Russian Football National League for Zenit-2 Saint Petersburg on 17 July 2018 in a game against Tambov. He left Zenit in 2020 to join Yenisey Krasnoyarsk, where he would go on to play a total of three games.

=== Caen ===
In October 2020, Molchan signed for Ligue 2 club Caen in a deal worth €11,000. Due to a visa problem, he arrived in Normandy in early December. He started the 2021–22 season in the reserve team that plays in the fourth tier of French football.
