= Vitali Gorulyov =

Russian footballer

Personal information
- Full name: Vitali Aleksandrovich Gorulyov
- Date of birth: 30 July 1998 (age 28)
- Place of birth: Saint Petersburg, Russia
- Height: 1.75 m (5 ft 9 in)
- Positions: Forward; midfielder

Youth career
- –2017: FC Zenit Saint Petersburg

Senior career*
Years	Team	Apps	(Gls)
2016–2019	FC Zenit-2 Saint Petersburg	17	(1)
2018–2019	→ FC Volgar Astrakhan (loan)	35	(0)
2019–2021	FC SKA-Khabarovsk	22	(0)
2021	→ FC Tyumen (loan)	11	(3)
2021–2022	FC Tyumen	24	(2)
2022–2023	FC Sokol Saratov	28	(3)
2023–2026	FC Leningradets Leningrad Oblast	46	(1)

International career^{‡}
2013	Russia U-16	4	(0)
- * Club domestic league appearances and goals as of 13 June 2026 ‡ National team caps and goals as of 17 August 2013

Vitali Aleksandrovich Gorulyov (Russian: Виталий Александрович Горулёв; born 30 July 1998) is a Russian football player.

== Club career ==
He made his debut in the Russian Football National League for FC Zenit-2 Saint Petersburg on 8 July 2017 in a game against FC Shinnik Yaroslavl.
