= Vladislavs Soloveičiks =

Latvian footballer

Personal information
- Date of birth: 25 May 1999 (age 27)
- Place of birth: Riga, Latvia
- Height: 1.81 m (5 ft 11 1/2 in)
- Position: Midfielder

Team information
- Current team: Spartaks Jūrmala
- Number: 8

Senior career*
| Years | Team | Apps | (Gls) |
| 2016 | Skonto | 0 | (0) |
| 2017 | RTU | 0 | (0) |
| 2017–2019 | Zenit Saint Petersburg | 0 | (0) |
| 2017–2019 | → Zenit-2 Saint Petersburg | 15 | (0) |
| 2019 | Valmieras | 14 | (1) |
| 2020 | Kolos Kovalivka | 0 | (0) |
| 2020 | Jelgava | 7 | (0) |
| 2021– | Spartaks Jūrmala | 23 | (0) |

International career^{‡}
| 2015 | Latvia U17 | 5 | (0) |
| 2016 | Latvia U18 | 6 | (0) |
| 2015–2018 | Latvia U19 | 27 | (2) |
| 2018– | Latvia U21 | 4 | (0) |
- * Club domestic league appearances and goals as of 23:00, 12 April 2022 (UTC) ‡ National team caps and goals as of 16 October 2018

Vladislavs Soloveičiks (born 25 May 1999) is a Latvian football player who plays for FK Jelgava.

== Club career ==
He made his debut in the Russian Football National League for FC Zenit-2 Saint Petersburg on 24 September 2017 in a game against FC Olimpiyets Nizhny Novgorod.
