= Anton Sinyak =

Russian footballer

Personal information
- Full name: Anton Igorevich Sinyak
- Date of birth: 30 January 1999 (age 27)
- Place of birth: Kandalaksha, Russia
- Height: 1.75 m (5 ft 9 in)
- Position: Left-back

Team information
- Current team: Sokol Saratov
- Number: 51

Youth career
- –2018: Zenit St. Petersburg

Senior career*
| Years | Team | Apps | (Gls) |
| 2018–2020 | Zenit-2 St. Petersburg | 41 | (0) |
| 2020 | → Tom Tomsk (loan) | 2 | (0) |
| 2020–2021 | Tom Tomsk | 33 | (0) |
| 2021–2023 | Chayka Peschanokopskoye | 57 | (0) |
| 2023–2024 | Tyumen | 20 | (1) |
| 2024– | Sokol Saratov | 51 | (0) |
- * Club domestic league appearances and goals as of 15 November 2026

Anton Igorevich Sinyak (Russian: Антон Игоревич Синяк; born 30 January 1999) is a Russian football player who plays for Sokol Saratov.

== Club career ==
He made his debut in the Russian Football National League for FC Zenit-2 Saint Petersburg on 17 July 2018 in a game against FC Tambov.

On 21 February 2020, he joined FC Tom Tomsk on loan until the end of the 2019–20 season.
