= Ilya Skrobotov =

Russian footballer

Personal information
- Full name: Ilya Valentinovich Skrobotov
- Date of birth: 6 July 2000 (age 26)
- Place of birth: Saint Petersburg, Russia
- Height: 1.93 m (6 ft 4 in)
- Position: Centre-back

Team information
- Current team: Isloch Minsk Raion
- Number: 33

Youth career
- 2005–2015: Tsarskoye Selo Pushkin
- 2015–2017: DYuSSh Smena-Zenit

Senior career*
Years	Team	Apps	(Gls)
2017–2022	Zenit Saint Petersburg	4	(1)
2018–2022	→ Zenit-2 Saint Petersburg	57	(2)
2023	Isloch Minsk Raion	22	(0)
2024–2025	Amkal Moscow		
2026–	Isloch Minsk Raion	13	(0)

International career
2016–2017	Russia U17	16	(2)
2017–2018	Russia U18	3	(0)
2019	Russia U20	3	(0)
- * Club domestic league appearances and goals as of 3 July 2026

Ilya Valentinovich Skrobotov (Russian: Илья Валентинович Скроботов; born 6 July 2000) is a Russian football player who plays for Isloch Minsk Raion.

== Club career ==
He made his debut in the Russian Premier League for FC Zenit Saint Petersburg on 1 April 2018 in a game against FC Ufa as a 90th minute substitute for Igor Smolnikov.

In his second game for Zenit's main squad on 18 April 2018 he scored an added-time goal to give his club a 2–1 win over FC Dynamo Moscow. He made his first starting lineup appearance in the next league game against FC Arsenal Tula on 22 April 2018, but manager Roberto Mancini substituted him with Igor Smolnikov after just 23 minutes of play "for tactical reasons".

== Career statistics ==
As of 14 November 2018

Club	Season	League			Cup		Continental		Total	
Club	Season	Division	Apps	Goals	Apps	Goals	Apps	Goals	Apps	Goals
Zenit St. Petersburg	2017–18	Russian Premier League	4	1	0	0	0	0	4	1
Zenit St. Petersburg	2018–19	Russian Premier League	0	0	0	0	0	0	0	0
Zenit St. Petersburg	Total		4	1	0	0	0	0	4	1
Zenit-2 St. Petersburg	2018–19	Russian Football National League	16	1	0	0	0	0	16	1
Career total			20	2	0	0	0	0	20	2
