= Ivan Andreyev =

Russian footballer

Personal information
- Full name: Ivan Dmitriyevich Andreyev
- Date of birth: 11 April 2000 (age 26)
- Place of birth: Saint Petersburg, Russia
- Height: 1.74 m (5 ft 9 in)
- Position: Midfielder

Senior career*
Years	Team	Apps	(Gls)
2017–2019	FC Zenit Saint Petersburg	0	(0)
2019–2022	FC Tom Tomsk	29	(2)
2021–2022	→ FC Zenit-2 Saint Petersburg (loan)	22	(0)
2022–2023	FC Dynamo Saint Petersburg	25	(1)
- * Club domestic league appearances and goals as of 3 June 2023

Ivan Dmitriyevich Andreyev (Russian: Иван Дмитриевич Андреев; born 11 April 2000) is a Russian football player.

== Club career ==
He made his debut in the Russian Football National League for FC Tom Tomsk on 24 March 2019 in a game against FC Mordovia Saransk.
