= Mikhail Ponomarenko =

Russian footballer (born 1999)

Personal information
- Full name: Mikhail Anatolyevich Ponomarenko
- Date of birth: 21 February 1999 (age 27)
- Place of birth: Blagoveshchensk, Russia
- Height: 1.94 m (6 ft 4 in)
- Position: Goalkeeper

Team information
- Current team: FC Alay Osh
- Number: 99

Youth career
- Zenit Saint Petersburg

Senior career*
Years	Team	Apps	(Gls)
2016–2019	Zenit Saint Petersburg 2	0	(0)
2017	→ VSS Košice (loan)	0	(0)
2019–2020	Luch Vladivostok	8	(0)
2020	Smolensk	12	(0)
2021	Arsenal-2 Tula	14	(0)
2022–2023	OTP	24	(0)
2024–	FC Alay Osh		
- * Club domestic league appearances and goals as of 19:57, 3 March 2024 (UTC)

Mikhail Anatolyevich Ponomarenko (Russian: Михаил Анатольевич Пономаренко; born 21 February 1999) is a Russian football player. He plays for Kyrgyzstan club FC Alay Osh.

== Club career ==
He made his debut in the Russian Football National League for Luch Vladivostok on 14 August 2019 in a game against Chayka Peschanokopskoye, as a starter.

Of Ukrainian descent, Ponomarenko fled Russia following the Russian invasion of Ukraine in 2022. Ponomarenko went on to play in Finland and Kyrgyzstan.
