= Nodari Kalichava =

Russian footballer

Personal information
- Full name: Nodari Avtandilovich Kalichava
- Date of birth: 24 November 2000 (age 25)
- Place of birth: Saint Petersburg, Russia
- Height: 1.98 m (6 ft 6 in)
- Position: Goalkeeper

Team information
- Current team: Dinamo Batumi
- Number: 13

Youth career
- –2017: FC Zenit Saint Petersburg
- 2017: SSh Lokomotiv Saint Petersburg
- 2017: FC Zenit Saint Petersburg

Senior career*
Years	Team	Apps	(Gls)
2017–2019	FC Zenit Saint Petersburg	0	(0)
2019	→ FC Zenit-2 Saint Petersburg	7	(0)
2019	FC Zvezda Saint Petersburg	7	(0)
2020–2022	FC Volga Ulyanovsk	13	(0)
2021–2022	→ FC Irtysh Omsk (loan)	15	(0)
2022–2026	Samgurali	70	(0)
2026	Abdysh-Ata	1	(0)
2026–	Dinamo Batumi	1	(0)

International career
2023	Georgia U21	1	(0)
- * Club domestic league appearances and goals as of 14 August 2026

Nodari Avtandilovich Kalichava (Georgian: ნოდარ ყალიჩავა, romanized: nodar q'alichava; Russian: Нодари Автандилович Каличава; born 24 November 2000) is a football player who currently plays for Erovnuli Liga club Dinamo Batumi as a goalkeeper.

== Club career ==
Kalichava made his debut in the Russian Football National League for FC Zenit-2 Saint Petersburg on 17 March 2019 in a game against Fakel.

In early 2023, Kalichava moved to Erovnuli Liga club Samgurali where he spent next three seasons.

In July 2026, he joined Dinamo Batumi on a deal until the end of 2027.

== International ==
Kalichava was a Georgian international, called up to the U21 team for the 2023 UEFA European Under-21 Championship.
