= Dmitry Bogayev =

Russian football player

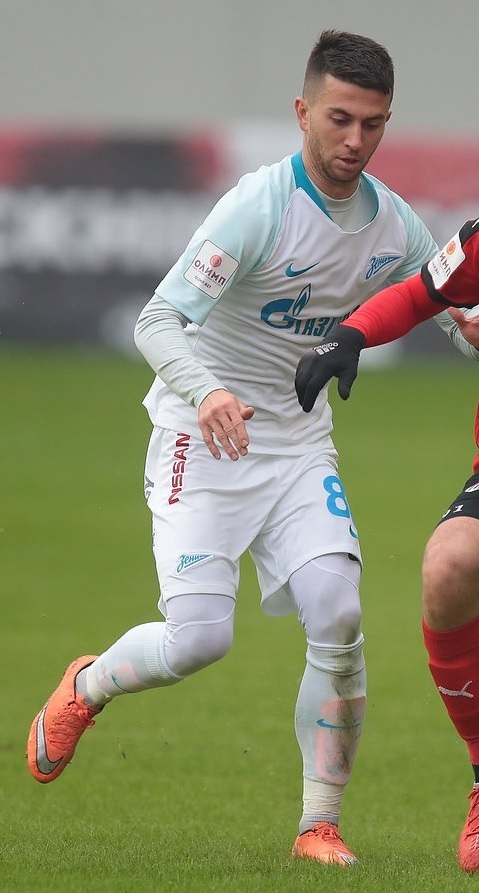
- Bogayev with Zenit-2 in 2019

Personal information
- Full name: Dmitry Aleksandrovich Bogayev
- Date of birth: 24 January 1994 (age 32)
- Place of birth: Akhtubinsk, Russia
- Height: 1.75 m (5 ft 9 in)
- Positions: Forward; midfielder; defender

Youth career
- Iskra Akhtubinsk
- 2011–2012: Zenit Saint Petersburg

Senior career*
| Years | Team | Apps | (Gls) |
| 2012–2016 | Zenit Saint Petersburg | 5 | (0) |
| 2013–2016 | Zenit-2 Saint Petersburg | 89 | (11) |
| 2016–2017 | FK Palanga | 4 | (0) |
| 2016–2017 | → FC Tosno (loan) | 24 | (0) |
| 2017–2020 | Zenit Saint Petersburg | 0 | (0) |
| 2017 | → Zenit-2 Saint Petersburg | 9 | (1) |
| 2018 | → FC SKA-Khabarovsk (loan) | 1 | (0) |
| 2018–2020 | → Zenit-2 Saint Petersburg | 32 | (1) |
| 2021 | Zvezda St. Petersburg | 22 | (0) |

International career
| 2015 | Russia U-21 | 5 | (0) |
- * Club domestic league appearances and goals

Dmitry Aleksandrovich Bogayev (Russian: Дмитрий Александрович Богаев; born 24 January 1994) is a Russian former football player. He played as a right-back or right midfielder.

== Club career ==
He made his professional debut in the Russian Professional Football League for FC Zenit-2 Saint Petersburg on 15 July 2013 in a game against FC Tosno.

He made his debut for the main squad of FC Zenit Saint Petersburg on 9 December 2015 in the 2015–16 UEFA Champions League group stage game against K.A.A. Gent.

He made his Russian Premier League debut for Zenit on 28 April 2016 in a game against FC Kuban Krasnodar.

He left Zenit on 5 July 2016.

On 15 June 2017, after one season with FC Tosno, he returned to Zenit, signing a 3-year contract.

On 6 February 2018, he joined FC SKA-Khabarovsk on loan until the end of the 2017–18 season.

== Career statistics ==
=== Club ===
As of 11 December 2017

| Club | Season | League | | | Cup | | Continental | | Total | |
| Club | Season | Division | Apps | Goals | Apps | Goals | Apps | Goals | Apps | Goals |
|---|---|---|---|---|---|---|---|---|---|---|
| Zenit St. Petersburg | 2011–12 | Russian Premier League | 0 | 0 | 0 | 0 | 0 | 0 | 0 | 0 |
| Zenit St. Petersburg | 2012–13 | Russian Premier League | 0 | 0 | 0 | 0 | 0 | 0 | 0 | 0 |
| Zenit St. Petersburg | 2013–14 | Russian Premier League | 0 | 0 | 0 | 0 | 0 | 0 | 0 | 0 |
| Zenit St. Petersburg | 2014–15 | Russian Premier League | 0 | 0 | 0 | 0 | 0 | 0 | 0 | 0 |
| Zenit St. Petersburg | 2015–16 | Russian Premier League | 5 | 0 | 1 | 0 | 1 | 0 | 7 | 0 |
| Zenit-2 St. Petersburg | 2013–14 | PFL | 29 | 1 | – | | – | | 29 | 1 |
| Zenit-2 St. Petersburg | 2014–15 | PFL | 29 | 5 | – | | – | | 29 | 5 |
| Zenit-2 St. Petersburg | 2015–16 | FNL | 31 | 5 | – | | – | | 31 | 5 |
| FK Palanga | 2016 | I Lyga | 4 | 0 | 1 | 0 | – | | 5 | 0 |
| FC Tosno | 2016–17 | FNL | 24 | 0 | 4 | 0 | – | | 28 | 0 |
| Zenit St. Petersburg | 2017–18 | Russian Premier League | 0 | 0 | 0 | 0 | 0 | 0 | 0 | 0 |
| Zenit St. Petersburg | Total (2 spells) | | 5 | 0 | 1 | 0 | 1 | 0 | 7 | 0 |
| Zenit-2 St. Petersburg | 2017–18 | FNL | 9 | 1 | – | | – | | 9 | 1 |
| Zenit-2 St. Petersburg | Total (2 spells) | | 98 | 12 | 0 | 0 | 0 | 0 | 98 | 12 |
| Career total | | | 131 | 12 | 6 | 0 | 1 | 0 | 138 | 12 |
