= Artyom Vyatkin =

Russian footballer

Personal information
- Full name: Artyom Dmitriyevich Vyatkin
- Date of birth: 5 March 1996 (age 30)
- Place of birth: Kedrovy, Russia
- Height: 1.88 m (6 ft 2 in)
- Position: Defender

Senior career*
Years	Team	Apps	(Gls)
2014	Lokomotiv-2 Moscow	9	(0)
2015–2019	Zenit Saint Petersburg	0	(0)
2015–2019	Zenit-2 Saint Petersburg	34	(1)
2017	→ Novigrad (loan)	14	(0)
2018	→ Lahti (loan)	26	(2)
2019–2020	Chayka Peschanokopskoye	13	(0)
2020	Torpedo-BelAZ Zhodino	2	(0)
2021–2022	Forte Taganrog	38	(2)

International career
2016	Russia U21	1	(0)
- * Club domestic league appearances and goals

Artyom Dmitriyevich Vyatkin (Russian: Артём Дмитриевич Вяткин; born 5 March 1996) is a Russian former football defender.

== Club career ==
He made his debut in the Russian Professional Football League for FC Lokomotiv-2 Moscow on 19 April 2014 in a game against FC Strogino Moscow.

He made his Russian Football National League debut for FC Zenit-2 Saint Petersburg on 20 July 2015 in a game against FC Tosno.

== Career statistics ==
As of 13 May 2025

Appearances and goals by club, season and competition
Club	Season	League			Cup (Note: Includes Croatian Cup, Suomen Cup and Russian Cup)		Europe		Total	
Club	Season	Division	Apps	Goals	Apps	Goals	Apps	Goals	Apps	Goals
Lokomotiv-2 Moscow	2013–14	Russian Second League	9	0	–		–		9	0
Zenit	2015–16	Russian Premier League	0	0	0	0	0	0	0	0
Zenit-2	2015–16	Russian First League	19	0	–		–		19	0
Zenit-2	2016–17	Russian First League	7	0	–		–		7	0
Zenit-2	2018–19	Russian First League	8	1	–		–		8	1
Zenit-2	Total		34	1	0	0	0	0	34	1
Novigrad (loan)	2017–18	Prva NL	14	0	1	0	–		15	0
Lahti (loan)	2018	Veikkausliiga	26	2	0	0	2 (Note: Appearances in UEFA Europa League)	0	28	2
Chayka	2019–20	Russian First League	13	0	–		–		13	0
Torpedo-BelAZ Zhodino	2020	Belarusian Premier League	2	0	0	0	–		2	0
Forte Taganrog	2020–21	Russian Second League	13	1	0	0	–		13	1
Forte Taganrog	2021–22	Russian Second League	21	2	1	0	–		22	2
Forte Taganrog	2022–23	Russian Second League	4	0	1	0	–		5	0
Forte Taganrog	Total		38	3	2	0	0	0	40	3
Career total			137	6	3	0	2	0	142	6
