= Stanislav Mareyev =

Russian footballer

Personal information
- Full name: Stanislav Igorevich Mareyev
- Date of birth: 25 June 1996 (age 30)
- Place of birth: Omsk, Russia
- Height: 1.90 m (6 ft 3 in)
- Position: Defender

Youth career
- –2008: DYuSSh Mytishchi
- 2008–2010: FShM Moscow
- 2010–2011: Yunosty Moskvy-Spartak-2 Moscow
- 2011–2014: FC Strogino Moscow

Senior career*
Years	Team	Apps	(Gls)
2014–2015	LFK Lokomotiv Moscow		
2015–2017	FC Zenit Saint Petersburg	0	(0)
2017–2022	FC Irtysh Omsk	64	(1)
- * Club domestic league appearances and goals

Stanislav Igorevich Mareyev (Russian: Станислав Игоревич Мареев; born 25 June 1996) is a Russian former football player.

== Club career ==
He made his debut in the Russian Football National League for FC Irtysh Omsk on 1 August 2020 in a game against FC Yenisey Krasnoyarsk, as a starter.
