= FC Dynamo-2 Saint Petersburg =

- Full name: Football Club Dynamo-2 Saint Petersburg
- Founded: 2017
- Dissolved: 2018
- League: Russian Professional Football League, Zone West
- 2017–18: 10th

FC Dynamo-2 Saint Petersburg (Russian: «Динамо-2» (Санкт-Петербург)) was a Russian football team from Saint Petersburg. It was the farm-club for FC Dynamo Saint Petersburg.

== History ==
Following Dynamo St. Petersburg's promotion to the second-tier Russian National Football League at the end of the 2016–17 season, the club decided to organize a farm-club. It was licensed to play in the third-tier Russian Professional Football League for the 2017–18 season. After the season, the parent club moved to Sochi, becoming PFC Sochi. The farm club was dissolved.
