= Nikita Andreyev (footballer, born November 1997) =

Russian football player

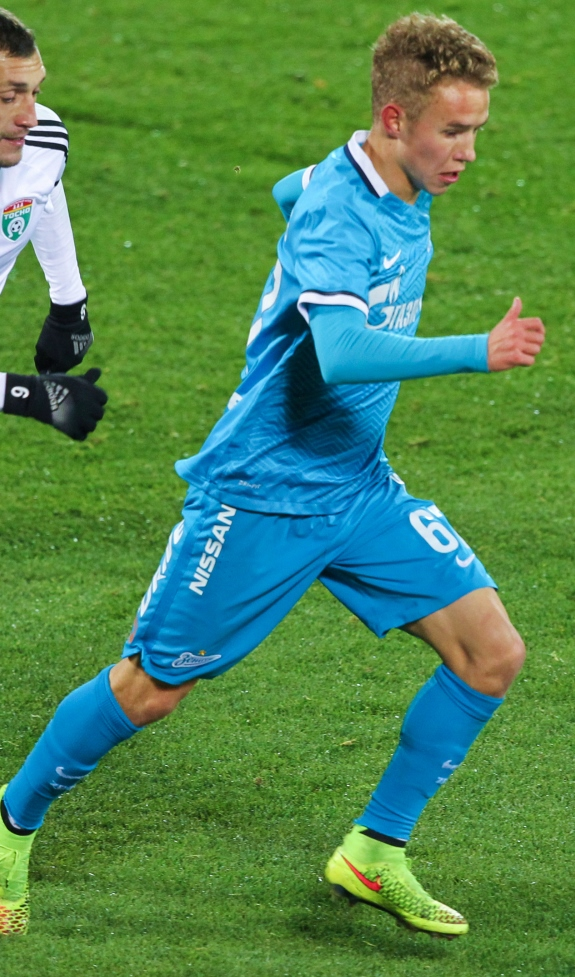
- Andreyev with Zenit Saint Petersburg in 2015

Personal information
- Full name: Nikita Aleksandrovich Andreyev
- Date of birth: 2 November 1997 (age 28)
- Place of birth: Lakhdenpokhya, Russia
- Height: 1.77 m (5 ft 10 in)
- Position: Midfielder

Team information
- Current team: Van
- Number: 23

Senior career*
Years	Team	Apps	(Gls)
2014–2017	Zenit Saint Petersburg	0	(0)
2016–2017	→ VSS Košice (loan)	17	(2)
2017	→ Zenit-2 Saint Petersburg	24	(2)
2018–2019	Anzhi Makhachkala	1	(0)
2018	→ Anzhi-2 Makhachkala	7	(0)
2019–2020	Van	13	(7)
- * Club domestic league appearances and goals

Nikita Aleksandrovich Andreyev (Russian: Никита Александрович Андреев; born 2 November 1997) is a Russian former football player.

== Club career ==
He made his professional debut for FC Zenit Saint Petersburg in the Russian Cup game against FC Tosno on 28 October 2015.

On 5 September 2016, he joined FC VSS Košice on loan.

On 22 February 2018, he signed a 3-year contract with FC Anzhi Makhachkala. He made his Russian Premier League debut for Anzhi on 10 March 2019 in a game against FC Lokomotiv Moscow.
