= 2016–17 FC Zenit Saint Petersburg season =

FC Zenit Saint Petersburg
2016–17 season
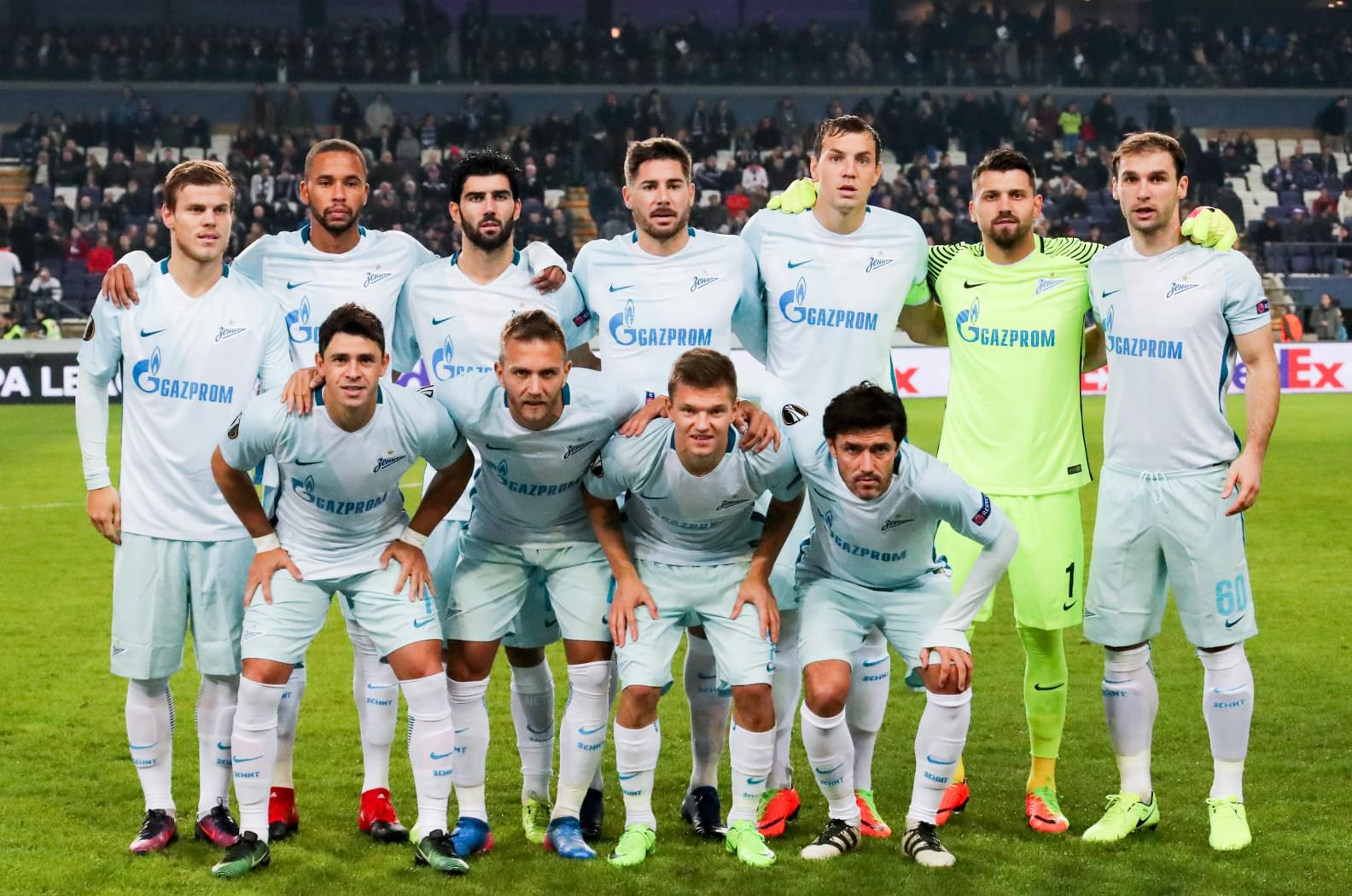
- Chairman: Aleksandr Dyukov
- Manager: Mircea Lucescu
- Stadium: Krestovsky Stadium
- Russian Premier League: 3rd
- Russian Cup: Round of 16 vs Anzhi Makhachkala
- Russian Super Cup: Winners
- Europa League: Round of 32 vs Anderlecht
- Top goalscorer: League: Dzyuba (13); All: Giuliano (17)
| Home colours | Away colours |

The 2016–17 Zenit Saint Petersburg season was the 92nd season in the club's history and its 21st consecutive season in the Russian Premier League.

== Season events ==
Prior to the start of the season, 24 May 2016, Mircea Lucescu replaced André Villas-Boas as manager of Zenit, following the expiry of Villas-Boas' contract.

== Squad ==
As of 1 February 2017

Note: Flags indicate national team as defined under FIFA eligibility rules; some limited exceptions apply. Players may hold more than one non-FIFA nationality.

| No. | Pos. | Nation | Player |
|---|---|---|---|
| 1 | GK | RUS | Yuri Lodygin |
| 2 | DF | RUS | Aleksandr Anyukov |
| 3 | DF | RUS | Ivan Novoseltsev |
| 4 | DF | ITA | Domenico Criscito |
| 5 | MF | RUS | Aleksandr Ryazantsev |
| 6 | DF | BEL | Nicolas Lombaerts |
| 7 | MF | BRA | Giuliano |
| 8 | MF | BRA | Maurício |
| 9 | FW | RUS | Aleksandr Kokorin |
| 10 | MF | POR | Danny |
| 11 | FW | RUS | Aleksandr Kerzhakov |
| 13 | DF | POR | Luís Neto |
| 14 | MF | RUS | Artur Yusupov |
| 17 | MF | RUS | Oleg Shatov |
| 19 | DF | RUS | Igor Smolnikov |

| No. | Pos. | Nation | Player |
|---|---|---|---|
| 20 | MF | RUS | Viktor Fayzulin |
| 21 | MF | ESP | Javi García |
| 22 | FW | RUS | Artem Dzyuba |
| 23 | DF | RUS | Yevgeni Chernov |
| 24 | MF | FRA | Yohan Mollo |
| 27 | DF | RUS | Sergei Zuykov |
| 29 | MF | SVK | Róbert Mak |
| 30 | DF | RUS | Ibragim Tsallagov |
| 33 | MF | BRA | Hernani |
| 60 | DF | SRB | Branislav Ivanović |
| 71 | GK | RUS | Yegor Baburin |
| 77 | FW | MNE | Luka Đorđević |
| 81 | MF | RUS | Yuriy Zhirkov |
| 98 | FW | RUS | Kirill Pogrebnyak |
| 99 | GK | RUS | Andrey Lunyov |

=== Out on loan ===
Note: Flags indicate national team as defined under FIFA eligibility rules; some limited exceptions apply. Players may hold more than one non-FIFA nationality.

| No. | Pos. | Nation | Player |
|---|---|---|---|
| 26 | DF | SRB | Vukašin Jovanović (at Bordeaux) |

=== Zenit-2 ===
Note: Flags indicate national team as defined under FIFA eligibility rules; some limited exceptions apply. Players may hold more than one non-FIFA nationality.

| No. | Pos. | Nation | Player |
|---|---|---|---|
| 5 | MF | RUS | Aleksandr Ryazantsev |
| 18 | MF | RUS | Konstantin Zyryanov (Captain) |
| 23 | DF | RUS | Yevgeni Chernov |
| 25 | MF | RUS | Aleksei Isayev |
| 26 | DF | SRB | Vukašin Jovanović |
| 32 | DF | RUS | David Mildzikhov |
| 34 | FW | RUS | Maximilian Pronichev |
| 38 | MF | RUS | Leon Musayev |
| 40 | MF | RUS | Yuri Bavin |
| 43 | FW | RUS | Pavel Nazimov |
| 45 | DF | RUS | Kirill Kostin |
| 46 | MF | RUS | Vitali Gorulyov |
| 47 | FW | RUS | Anton Zinkovskiy |
| 48 | FW | RUS | Aleksei Gasilin |
| 50 | DF | RUS | Maksim Karpov |
| 55 | DF | RUS | Konstantin Lobov |

| No. | Pos. | Nation | Player |
|---|---|---|---|
| 56 | DF | RUS | Danil Krugovoy |
| 58 | DF | RUS | Ilya Zuyev |
| 64 | FW | RUS | Daniil Lesovoy |
| 65 | MF | RUS | Danila Yashchuk |
| 70 | GK | RUS | Nikita Goylo |
| 71 | GK | RUS | Yegor Baburin |
| 75 | DF | RUS | Temur Mustafin |
| 83 | GK | RUS | Igor Obukhov |
| 87 | DF | RUS | Artyom Vyatkin |
| 88 | MF | RUS | Nikita Salamatov |
| 92 | FW | RUS | Pavel Dolgov |
| 93 | GK | RUS | Mikhail Kizeyev |
| 94 | MF | RUS | Alexey Yevseyev |
| 97 | MF | RUS | Ilya Kamyshev |
| 98 | FW | RUS | Ivan Ivanchenko |

== Transfers ==
=== Summer ===
In: Note: Flags indicate national team as defined under FIFA eligibility rules; some limited exceptions apply. Players may hold more than one non-FIFA nationality.

| No. | Pos. | Nation | Player |
|---|---|---|---|
| 3 | DF | RUS | Ivan Novoseltsev (from (Russia) Rostov) |
| 5 | MF | RUS | Aleksandr Ryazantsev (end of loan to (Russia) Ural Sverdlovsk Oblast) |
| 7 | MF | BRA | Giuliano (from (Brazil) Grêmio) |
| 11 | FW | RUS | Aleksandr Kerzhakov (end of loan to (Switzerland) Zürich) |
| 15 | MF | RUS | Pavel Mogilevets (end of loan to (Russia) Rostov) |
| 29 | MF | SVK | Róbert Mak (from (Greece) PAOK) |
| 34 | FW | RUS | Maximilian Pronichev (end of loan to (Germany) Schalke 04 U19) |
| 43 | MF | RUS | Nikita Koldunov |
| 48 | FW | RUS | Aleksei Gasilin (end of loan to (Germany) Schalke 04 II) |
| 54 | DF | RUS | Nikita Kakkoyev |
| 62 | MF | RUS | Maksim Levin |
| 66 | DF | RUS | Samir Bayramov |
| 68 | MF | RUS | Yefim Boytsov |
| 70 | GK | RUS | Nikita Goylo |
| 75 | DF | RUS | Temur Mustafin (from (Russia) Rostov) |
| 76 | MF | RUS | Kirill Makeyev |
| 77 | FW | MNE | Luka Đorđević (end of loan to (Spain) Ponferradina) |
| 78 | FW | RUS | Aleksandr Nekrasov |
| 79 | DF | RUS | Daniil Penchikov |
| 86 | GK | RUS | Nikolai Rybikov |
| 89 | GK | RUS | Amir Fattakhov |
| 90 | FW | RUS | Yefrem Vartanyan |
| 97 | MF | RUS | Ilya Kamyshev (from (Russia) Chertanovo Moscow) |
| — | MF | RUS | Aleksei Isayev (from (Russia) Yenisey Krasnoyarsk) |

Out: Note: Flags indicate national team as defined under FIFA eligibility rules; some limited exceptions apply. Players may hold more than one non-FIFA nationality.

| No. | Pos. | Nation | Player |
|---|---|---|---|
| 7 | FW | BRA | Hulk (to (China) Shanghai SIPG) |
| 16 | GK | RUS | Vyacheslav Malafeev (retired) |
| 24 | DF | ARG | Ezequiel Garay (to (Spain) Valencia) |
| 32 | DF | RUS | Artyom Sumin |
| 37 | FW | RUS | Artyom Ponikarov |
| 43 | FW | RUS | Pavel Nazimov |
| 45 | DF | RUS | Artyom Vodyannikov |
| 47 | MF | RUS | Valeri Yaroshenko (to (Russia) Rostov) |
| 51 | GK | RUS | Maksim Rudakov (loan to (Russia) Zenit Penza) |
| 52 | DF | RUS | Andrei Ivanov (on loan to (Russia) Mordovia Saransk) |
| 54 | MF | RUS | Daniil Zuyev |
| 57 | DF | RUS | Nikolai Tarasov |
| 60 | MF | RUS | Maksim Paliyenko (end of loan from (Russia) Krylia Sovetov Samara) |
| 62 | DF | RUS | Stepan Rebenko (to (Russia) Arsenal Tula) |
| 66 | FW | RUS | Vadim Romanov |
| 67 | MF | RUS | Nikita Andreyev (on loan to (Slovakia) VSS Košice) |
| 68 | MF | RUS | Vyacheslav Zinkov (to (Russia) Krylia Sovetov Samara) |
| 70 | FW | RUS | Dmitri Bogayev (to (Lithuania) Palanga) |
| 73 | MF | RUS | Pavel Osipov (on loan to (Finland) Lahti) |
| 74 | MF | RUS | Sergei Ivanov (on loan to (Slovakia) VSS Košice) |
| 75 | DF | RUS | Andrei Vasilyev |
| 76 | FW | RUS | Pavel Kireyenko (to (Lithuania) Palanga) |
| 80 | GK | RUS | Mikhail Mzhelsky |
| 83 | GK | RUS | Igor Obukhov (to (Russia) Zenit-2 St. Petersburg) |
| 88 | MF | RUS | Artyom Popov (to (Russia) Tom Tomsk) |
| 90 | FW | RUS | Ramil Sheydayev (to (Turkey) Trabzonspor) |
| 95 | GK | RUS | Aleksandr Vasyutin (on loan to (Finland) Lahti) |
| 96 | MF | RUS | Ilya Kubyshkin (to (Czech Republic) Slovan Liberec) |
| 97 | FW | RUS | Ruslan Suanov |
| 98 | FW | RUS | Yevgeni Reutov |
| — | DF | ARG | Cristian Ansaldi (to (Italy) Genoa, previously on loan) |
| — | DF | RUS | Dmitri Chistyakov (to (Russia) Shinnik Yaroslavl, previously on loan to (Armenia) Mika) |
| — | MF | RUS | Ivan Solovyov (to (Russia) Fakel Voronezh, previously on loan to (Finland) Lahti) |

=== Winter ===
In: Note: Flags indicate national team as defined under FIFA eligibility rules; some limited exceptions apply. Players may hold more than one non-FIFA nationality.

| No. | Pos. | Nation | Player |
|---|---|---|---|
| 16 | GK | RUS | Andrey Lunyov (from (Russia) Ufa) |
| 24 | MF | FRA | Yohan Mollo (from (Russia) Krylia Sovetov Samara) |
| 27 | DF | RUS | Sergei Zuykov (from (Russia) Volgar Astrakhan) |
| 30 | DF | RUS | Ibragim Tsallagov (from (Russia) Krylia Sovetov Samara) |
| 33 | MF | BRA | Hernani (from (Brazil) Atlético Paranaense) |
| 35 | MF | RUS | Yuri Pershin |
| 44 | MF | ENG | Jacob Gardiner-Smith (from (Russia) CSKA Moscow) |
| 47 | MF | RUS | Ruslan Kazakov |
| 57 | MF | RUS | Pavel Korkin |
| 60 | DF | SRB | Branislav Ivanović (from (England) Chelsea) |
| 64 | FW | RUS | Daniil Lesovoy (from (Ukraine) Dynamo Kyiv) |
| 73 | DF | RUS | Aleksei Plotnikov |
| 80 | GK | RUS | Mikhail Mzhelsky |
| 82 | FW | RUS | Aleksandr Yelovskikh |
| 92 | FW | RUS | Daniil Kultinov |
| 99 | GK | RUS | Andrey Lunyov (from (Russia) Ufa) |

Out: Note: Flags indicate national team as defined under FIFA eligibility rules; some limited exceptions apply. Players may hold more than one non-FIFA nationality.

| No. | Pos. | Nation | Player |
|---|---|---|---|
| 15 | MF | RUS | Pavel Mogilevets (to (Russia) Rostov) |
| 26 | DF | SRB | Vukašin Jovanović (on loan to (France) Bordeaux) |
| 28 | MF | BEL | Axel Witsel (to (China) Tianjin Quanjian) |
| 36 | FW | RUS | Stanislav Krapukhin (to (Russia) Zenit-2 St. Petersburg) |
| 41 | GK | RUS | Mikhail Kerzhakov (on loan to (Russia) Orenburg) |
| 47 | FW | RUS | Anton Zinkovskiy (end of loan from (Russia) Chertanovo Moscow) |
| 48 | FW | RUS | Aleksei Gasilin (to (Russia) Amkar Perm) |
| 54 | DF | RUS | Nikita Kakkoyev (to (Russia) Zenit-2 St. Petersburg) |
| 63 | DF | RUS | Daniil Maykov (to (Bulgaria) Slavia Sofia) |
| 64 | FW | RUS | Daniil Lesovoy (to (Russia) Zenit-2 St. Petersburg) |
| 83 | GK | RUS | Igor Obukhov (on loan to (Russia) Tyumen) |
| 85 | FW | RUS | Yuri Kozlov (to (Russia) Zenit-2 St. Petersburg) |
| 88 | MF | RUS | Nikita Salamatov (to (Russia) SKA Rostov-on-Don) |
| 92 | FW | RUS | Pavel Dolgov (to (Russia) Anzhi Makhachkala) |
| 98 | FW | RUS | Ivan Ivanchenko (to (Russia) Anzhi Makhachkala) |

== Competitions ==
=== Russian Super Cup ===
| 23 July 2016 | CSKA Moscow | 0 – 1 | Zenit St.Petersburg | Moscow |
| 19:00 MSK (UTC+3) | Natcho (yellow card) 61'; Wernbloom (yellow card) 62'; Tošić (yellow card) 62' | Summary | Kokorin (yellow card) 45'; Maurício 22' (yellow card) 62'; Shatov (yellow card) 62'; Lodigin (yellow card) 76' | Stadium: Lokomotiv Stadium; Attendance: 22,000; Referee: Sergey Karasev |

=== Russian Premier League ===
==== Results by round ====
| Round | 1 | 2 | 3 | 4 | 5 | 6 | 7 | 8 | 9 | 10 | 11 | 12 | 13 | 14 | 15 | 16 | 17 | 18 | 19 | 20 | 21 | 22 | 23 | 24 | 25 | 26 | 27 | 28 | 29 | 30 |
|---|---|---|---|---|---|---|---|---|---|---|---|---|---|---|---|---|---|---|---|---|---|---|---|---|---|---|---|---|---|---|
| Ground | H | A | H | H | H | A | H | A | H | A | H | H | A | H | A | H | A | A | A | H | A | H | A | H | A | A | H | A | H | A |
| Result | D | D | W | D | W | W | W | D | W | W | W | W | L | W | L | W | D | D | L | W | W | D | L | W | W | W | L | W | W | W |
| Position | 7 | 10 | 5 | 8 | 4 | 3 | 3 | 3 | 2 | 2 | 2 | 2 | 2 | 2 | 2 | 2 | 2 | 2 | 3 | 3 | 3 | 3 | 3 | 3 | 3 | 2 | 3 | 3 | 3 | 3 |

Updated to match(es) played on 21 May 2017. Source: See results
A = Away; H = Home; W = Win; D = Draw; L = Loss

==== Matches ====
| 30 July 2016 1 | Zenit St.Petersburg | 0 – 0 | Lokomotiv Moscow | Saint Petersburg |
| 17:30 MSK (UTC+3) | Neto (yellow card) 80' | Summary | Škuletić (yellow card) 36'; N'Dinga (yellow card) 51'; Tarasov (yellow card) 84' | Stadium: Petrovsky Stadium; Attendance: 18,427; Referee: Aleksandr Egorov |

| 6 August 2016 2 | Ufa | 0 – 0 | Zenit St.Petersburg | Ufa |
| 17:00 MSK (UTC+3) | Alikin (yellow card) 71' | Summary | Kokorin (yellow card) 52'; Criscito (yellow card) 79'; Neto (yellow card) 87'; Witsel (yellow card) 90' | Stadium: Neftyanik Stadium; Attendance: 7,800; Referee: Vitaly Meshkov |

| 12 August 2016 3 | Zenit St.Petersburg | 3 – 2 | Rostov | Saint Petersburg |
| 19:30 MSK (UTC+3) | Smolnikov (yellow card) 29'; García (yellow card) 33'; Witsel (yellow card) 45+2'; Giuliano 50' (pen.); Kokorin (yellow card) 68'; Ezatolahi 72' (o.g.); Đorđević 85' (yellow card) 86' | Summary | Poloz 8', 14'; Kalachou (yellow card) 18'; Gațcan (yellow card) 30' (yellow-red card) 44'; Navas (yellow card) 49' | Stadium: Petrovsky Stadium; Attendance: 17,967; Referee: Vladimir Moskalyov |

| 20 August 2016 4 | Zenit St.Petersburg | 1 – 1 | CSKA Moscow | Saint Petersburg |
| 17:00 MSK (UTC+3) | García (yellow card) 41'; Zhirkov 45'; Shatov (yellow card) 61' | Summary | Ignashevich (yellow card) 21'; Eremenko 24'; Wernbloom (yellow card) 27'; Milanov (yellow card) 41' | Stadium: Petrovsky Stadium; Attendance: 17,678; Referee: Sergei Ivanov |

| 27 August 2016 5 | Zenit St.Petersburg | 3 – 0 | Amkar Perm | Saint Petersburg |
| 18:00 MSK (UTC+3) | Giuliano 22', 32'; Criscito 89' | Summary | | Stadium: Petrovsky Stadium; Attendance: 17,864; Referee: Vladimir Seldyakov |

| 11 September 2016 6 | Arsenal Tula | 0 – 5 | Zenit St.Petersburg | Tula |
| 19:00 MSK (UTC+3) | | Summary | Kokorin 18'; Dzyuba 38'; Mak 66'; Giuliano 84'; Kerzhakov 89' (pen.) | Stadium: Arsenal Stadium; Attendance: 18,200; Referee: Aleksandr Egorov |

| 19 September 2016 7 | Zenit St.Petersburg | 4 – 1 | Rubin Kazan | Saint Petersburg |
| 19:30 MSK (UTC+3) | Criscito 16' (pen.); Mak 53'; Dzyuba (yellow card) 57' (goal) 63'; Giuliano 59'; Đorđević (yellow card) 77'; Smolnikov (yellow card) 88' | Summary | Carlos Zambrano (yellow card) 57'; Jonathas 86'; Lestienne (yellow card) 88' | Stadium: Petrovsky Stadium; Attendance: 17,008; Referee: Aleksei Matyunin |

| 25 September 2016 8 | Anzhi Makhachkala | 2 – 2 | Zenit St.Petersburg | Kaspiysk |
| 19:30 MSK (UTC+3) | Berisha 28' (pen.) (yellow card) 87'; Gasanov (yellow card) 39'; Boli (yellow card) 61' (goal) 64'; Yambéré (yellow card) 74' | Summary | Dzyuba 6', 18'; García (yellow card) 72'; Zhirkov (yellow card) 90+2' | Stadium: Anzhi Arena; Attendance: 9,800; Referee: Aleksey Eskov |

| 2 October 2016 9 | Zenit St.Petersburg | 4 – 2 | Spartak Moscow | Saint Petersburg |
| 16:30 MSK (UTC+3) | Criscito 20' (pen.) (yellow card) 31'; Dzyuba 33' (yellow card) 34'; Witsel 61'; Giuliano 87' (pen.); Neto (yellow card) 90' | Summary | Bocchetti 28' (yellow card) 54'; Zé Luís (yellow card) 31' (goal) 37'; Glushakov (yellow card) 49'; Yeshchenko (yellow card) 86' | Stadium: Petrovsky Stadium; Attendance: 18,684; Referee: Sergey Ivanov |

| 16 October 2016 10 | Ural Yekaterinburg | 0 – 2 | Zenit St.Petersburg | Yekaterinburg |
| 14:00 MSK (UTC+3) | Pavlyuchenko (yellow card) 54' | Summary | Shatov 22'; Neto (yellow card) 69'; Yusupov 89' | Stadium: SKB-Bank Arena; Attendance: 8,500; Referee: Igor Fedotov |

| 24 October 2016 11 | Zenit St.Petersburg | 1 – 0 | Orenburg | Saint Petersburg |
| 19:30 MSK (UTC+3) | Mak 17'; García (yellow card) 68'; Yusupov (yellow card) 81' | Summary | Koronov (yellow card) 42'; Vorobyov (yellow card) 85' | Stadium: Petrovsky Stadium; Attendance: 17,685; Referee: Alexey Nikolaev |

| 30 October 2016 12 | Zenit St.Petersburg | 1 – 0 | Tom Tomsk | Saint Petersburg |
| 17:00 MSK (UTC+3) | Kokorin 26'; Witsel (yellow card) 49'; Criscito (yellow card) 67'; Yusupov (yellow card) 90+2' | Summary | Popov (yellow card) 15'; Dyakov (yellow card) 49'; Droppa (yellow card) 60'; Kudryashov (yellow card) 89' | Stadium: Petrovsky Stadium; Attendance: 17,000; Referee: Vitaly Meshkov |

| 6 November 2016 13 | Terek Grozny | 2 – 1 | Zenit St.Petersburg | Grozny |
| 17:00 MSK (UTC+3) | Balaj 34', 38'; Roshi (yellow card) 42'; Utsiyev (yellow card) 52'; Kuzyayev (yellow card) 68' | Summary | Mak 10'; Criscito (yellow card) 54'; Neto (yellow card) 55' (yellow-red card) 90+2'; Witsel (yellow card) 87' | Stadium: Akhmat-Arena; Attendance: 16,708; Referee: Sergey Karasev |

| 20 November 2016 14 | Zenit St.Petersburg | 3 – 1 | Krylia Sovetov | Saint Petersburg |
| 19:30 MSK (UTC+3) | Dzyuba 10', 89' (pen.); Rodić 36' (o.g.); Maurício (yellow card) 69' | Summary | Pasquato 4'; Nadson (yellow card) 22'; Taranov (yellow card) 52'; Margasov (yellow card) 63' | Stadium: Petrovsky Stadium; Attendance: 16,930; Referee: Aleksandr Egorov |

| 27 November 2016 15 | Krasnodar | 2 – 1 | Zenit St.Petersburg | Krasnodar |
| 19:00 MSK (UTC+3) | Laborde (yellow card) 49'; Jędrzejczyk (yellow card) 75'; Izmailov (yellow card) 85' (goal) 90+2'; Torbinski (yellow card) 90'; Okriashvili 90+4' | Summary | Witsel (yellow card) 45'; García (yellow card) 80'; Dzyuba 86' (yellow card) 90+3' | Stadium: Krasnodar Stadium; Attendance: 31,854; Referee: Alexey Nikolaev |

| 30 November 2016 16 | Zenit St.Petersburg | 2 – 0 | Ufa | Saint Petersburg |
| 19:30 MSK (UTC+3) | Neto (yellow card) 44'; Giuliano 84'; Kokorin 90+3' | Summary | Bezdenezhnykh (yellow card) 49' | Stadium: Petrovsky Stadium; Attendance: 15,813; Referee: Mikhail Vilkov |

| 3 December 2016 17 | Rostov | 0 – 0 | Zenit St.Petersburg | Rostov-on-Don |
| 19:00 MSK (UTC+3) | Kalachev (yellow card) 49'; Azmoun (yellow card) 88' | Summary | Yusupov (yellow card) 43'; Criscito (yellow card) 45+1'; Neto (yellow card) 60' | Stadium: Olimp-2; Attendance: 9,110; Referee: Vitaly Meshkov |

| 4 March 2017 18 | CSKA Moscow | 0 – 0 | Zenit St.Petersburg | Moscow |
| 16:30 MSK (UTC+3) | Golovin (yellow card) 29'; A.Berezutski (yellow card) 36'; Wernbloom (yellow card) 65' (yellow-red card) 70' | Summary | García (yellow card) 65'; Zhirkov (yellow card) 90+3' | Stadium: Arena CSKA; Attendance: 26,800; Referee: Aleksandr Egorov |

| 12 March 2017 19 | Amkar Perm | 1 – 0 | Zenit St.Petersburg | Perm |
| 11:30 MSK (UTC+3) | Komolov (yellow card) 23'; Zanev (yellow card) 27'; Gigolayev 33'; Gasilin (yellow card) 34'; Khomich (yellow card) 60'; Gol (yellow card) 73' | Summary | Neto (yellow card) 60'; Criscito (yellow card) 77' | Stadium: Zvezda Stadium; Attendance: 12,200; Referee: Evgeny Turbin |

| 19 March 2017 20 | Zenit St.Petersburg | 2 – 0 | Arsenal Tula | Saint Petersburg |
| 19:30 MSK (UTC+3) | Kokorin (yellow card) 36'; Criscito 51' (pen.); Danny 53'; Hernani (yellow card) 61' | Summary | Gabulov (yellow card) 53' | Stadium: Petrovsky Stadium; Attendance: 16,903; Referee: Aleksey Eskov |

| 2 April 2017 21 | Rubin Kazan | 0 – 2 | Zenit St.Petersburg | Kazan |
| 14:00 MSK (UTC+3) | Kambolov (yellow card) 77'; Nabiullin (yellow card) 88' | Summary | Dzyuba 36'; Danny 40'; Yusupov (yellow card) 49' (yellow-red card) 83'; Lombaerts (yellow card) 62'; Giuliano (yellow card) 65'; Criscito (yellow card) 90+1' | Stadium: Kazan Arena; Attendance: 10,022; Referee: Vladimir Seldyakov |

| 8 April 2017 22 | Zenit St.Petersburg | 1 – 1 | Anzhi Makhachkala | Saint Petersburg |
| 19::00 MSK (UTC+3) | Lombaerts (red card) 50'; Hernani (yellow card) 59'; Kokorin 73' | Summary | Forbes (yellow card) 14'; Yakovlev 21'; Budkivskyi (yellow card) 39'; Guliyev (yellow card) 57'; Phibel (yellow card) 78'; Khubulov (yellow card) 82'; Ezatolahi (yellow card) 89' | Stadium: Petrovsky Stadium; Attendance: 17,620; Referee: Aleksey Sukhoy |

| 16 April 2017 23 | Spartak Moscow | 2 – 1 | Zenit St.Petersburg | Moscow |
| 20:00 MSK (UTC+3) | Promes 21' (yellow card) 85'; Samedov 80' | Summary | Dzyuba 66' | Stadium: Otkrytiye Arena; Attendance: 43,333; Referee: Aleksandr Egorov |

| 22 April 2017 24 | Zenit St.Petersburg | 2 – 0 | Ural Yekaterinburg | Saint Petersburg |
| 14:00 MSK (UTC+3) | Ivanović 86'; Dzyuba (yellow card) 86'; Criscito (yellow card) 89'; Mollo 90+3' | Summary | Bicfalvi (yellow card) 23' (yellow-red card) 60'; Yemelyanov (yellow card) 40' (yellow-red card) 86'; Pavlyuchenko (yellow card) 61' (red card) 61' | Stadium: Krestovsky Stadium; Attendance: 2,004; Referee: Aleksey Eskov |

| 26 April 2017 25 | Orenburg | 0 – 1 | Zenit St.Petersburg | Orenburg |
| 17:00 MSK (UTC+3) | | Summary | Giuliano 17' (pen.); Neto (yellow card) 43'; Shatov (yellow card) 60'; Smolnikov (yellow card) 66'; Tsallagov (yellow card) 81'; García (yellow card) 90' | Stadium: Gazovik Stadium; Attendance: 5,543; Referee: Mikhail Vilkov |

| 1 May 2017 26 | Tom Tomsk | 0 – 2 | Zenit St.Petersburg | Tomsk |
| 13:00 MSK (UTC+3) | Sobolev (yellow card) 31' | Summary | Criscito (yellow card) 31'; Shatov 35'; Danny 83' (yellow card) 84' | Stadium: Trud Stadium; Attendance: 6,958; Referee: Roman Galimov |

| 7 May 2017 27 | Zenit St.Petersburg | 0 – 1 | Terek Grozny | Saint Petersburg |
| 19:00 MSK (UTC+3) | Shatov (yellow card) 70' (red card) 90+6' | Summary | Mohammadi (yellow card) 27'; Mbengue 65' | Stadium: Krestovsky Stadium; Attendance: 30,673; Referee: Vladimir Seldyakov |

| 13 May 2017 28 | Krylia Sovetov | 1 – 3 | Zenit St.Petersburg | Samara |
| 16:00 MSK (UTC+3) | Bateau (yellow card) 38'; Ivanović 55' (o.g.); Bozhin (yellow card) 59'; Zotov (yellow card) 81' | Summary | Dzyuba 1', 8'; García 35' | Stadium: Metallurg Stadium; Attendance: 18,750; Referee: Aleksandr Egorov |

| 17 May 2017 29 | Zenit St.Petersburg | 1 – 0 | Krasnodar | Saint Petersburg |
| 19:30 MSK (UTC+3) | Dzyuba 12'; García (yellow card) 60'; Yusupov (yellow card) 87' | Report | Kaboré (yellow card) 71' | Stadium: Petrovsky Stadium; Attendance: 18,098; Referee: Vladimir Seldyakov |

| 21 May 2017 30 | Lokomotiv Moscow | 0 – 2 | Zenit St.Petersburg | Moscow |
| 15:00 MSK (UTC+3) | Guilherme (yellow card) 35'; Fernandes (yellow card) 35'; Denisov (yellow card) 38'; Pejčinović (yellow card) 79' | Report | Kokorin 33'; Dzyuba (yellow card) 38'; Criscito (yellow card) 39'; Danny 83' | Stadium: Lokomotiv Stadium; Attendance: 14,022; Referee: Mikhail Vilkov |

==== League table ====
| Pos | Team | Pld | W | D | L | GF | GA | GD | Pts | Qualification or relegation |
|---|---|---|---|---|---|---|---|---|---|---|
| 1 | Spartak Moscow (C) | 30 | 22 | 3 | 5 | 46 | 27 | +19 | 69 | Qualification for the Champions League group stage |
| 2 | CSKA Moscow | 30 | 18 | 8 | 4 | 47 | 15 | +32 | 62 | Qualification for the Champions League third qualifying round |
| 3 | Zenit Saint Petersburg | 30 | 18 | 7 | 5 | 50 | 19 | +31 | 61 | Qualification for the Europa League third qualifying round |
| 4 | Krasnodar | 30 | 12 | 13 | 5 | 40 | 22 | +18 | 49 | Qualification for the Europa League third qualifying round |
| 5 | Terek Grozny | 30 | 14 | 6 | 10 | 38 | 35 | +3 | 48 | |

Source: Russian Premier League, Soccerway
Rules for classification: 1) Points; 2) Matches won; 3) Head-to-head points; 4) Head-to-head matches won; 5) Head-to-head goal difference; 6) Head-to-head goals scored; 7) Head-to-head away goals; 8) Goal difference; 9) Goals scored; 10) Away goals scored.
(C) Champions

=== Russian Cup ===
| 22 September 2016 Round of 32 | Tambov | 0 – 5 | Zenit St.Petersburg | Tambov |
| 14:00 MSK (UTC+3) | Dutov (yellow card) 57' | Summary | Mak 29'; Shatov 47'; Kokorin 61'; Đorđević 77'; Gasilin (yellow card) 81'; Giuliano 84' | Stadium: Spartak Stadium; Attendance: 5,500; Referee: Sergei Kulikov |

| 27 October 2016 Round of 16 | Anzhi Makhachkala | 4 – 0 | Zenit St.Petersburg | Kaspiysk |
| 18:00 MSK (UTC+3) | Gasanov 29'; Budkivskyi (yellow card) 31' (goal) 62', 70'; Berisha (yellow card) 36' (goal) 79'; Gadzhibekov (yellow card) 51' (red card) 89'; Mayewski (yellow card) 89' | Summary | Neto (yellow card) 36'; Kokorin (yellow card) 56'; Kerzhakov (red card) 58'; Zhirkov (yellow card) 67'; Giuliano (red card) 89'; Witsel (yellow card) 89' | Stadium: Anzhi Arena; Attendance: 6,100; Referee: Vladimir Moskalyov |

=== UEFA Europa League ===
==== Group stage ====
| Pos | Team | Pld | W | D | L | GF | GA | GD | Pts | Qualification | ZEN | AZ | MTA | DUN |
|---|---|---|---|---|---|---|---|---|---|---|---|---|---|---|
| 1 | (Russia) Zenit Saint Petersburg | 6 | 5 | 0 | 1 | 17 | 8 | +9 | 15 | Advance to knockout phase | — | 5–0 | 2–0 | 2–1 |
| 2 | (Netherlands) AZ | 6 | 2 | 2 | 2 | 6 | 10 | −4 | 8 | Advance to knockout phase | 3–2 | — | 1–2 | 1–1 |
| 3 | (Israel) Maccabi Tel Aviv | 6 | 2 | 1 | 3 | 7 | 9 | −2 | 7 | | 3–4 | 0–0 | — | 2–1 |
| 4 | (Republic of Ireland) Dundalk | 6 | 1 | 1 | 4 | 5 | 8 | −3 | 4 | | 1–2 | 0–1 | 1–0 | — |

Source: UEFA

| 15 September 2016 1 | Maccabi Tel Aviv (Israel) | 3 – 4 | (Russia) Zenit St.Petersburg | Netanya, Israel |
| 20:00 MSK (UTC+3) | Medunjanin 26', 70' (yellow card) 87'; Kjartansson 50'; Rajković (yellow card) 77'; Dasa (yellow card) 78' (yellow-red card) 81'; Micha (yellow card) 83' | Report | Kokorin (yellow card) 19' (goal) 77'; García (yellow card) 57'; Witsel (yellow card) 60'; Maurício 84'; Giuliano 86'; Đorđević 90+2' | Stadium: Netanya Stadium; Attendance: 10,855; Referee: Ivan Kružliak (Slovakia) |

| 29 September 2016 2 | Zenit St.Petersburg (Russia) | 5 – 0 | (Netherlands) AZ | Saint Petersburg, Russia |
| 22:05 MSK (UTC+3) | Neto (yellow card) 11'; García (yellow card) 22'; Kokorin 26', 59'; Giuliano 48'; Criscito 66' (pen.); Shatov 80' | Report | Wuytens (yellow card) 79'; Lewis (yellow card) 90+1' | Stadium: Petrovsky Stadium; Attendance: 15,275; Referee: Xavier Estrada Fernández (Spain) |

| 20 October 2016 3 | Dundalk (Republic of Ireland) | 1 – 2 | (Russia) Zenit St.Petersburg | Dublin, Republic of Ireland |
| 22:05 MSK (UTC+3) | Benson 52'; B.Gartland (yellow card) 90+1' | Report | Shatov (yellow card) 29'; García (yellow card) 37'; Neto (yellow card) 59'; Anyukov (yellow card) 61'; Criscito (yellow card) 67'; Mak 71'; Giuliano 77' | Stadium: Tallaght Stadium; Attendance: 5,500; Referee: Miroslav Zelinka (Czech Republic) |

| 3 November 2016 4 | Zenit St.Petersburg (Russia) | 2 – 1 | (Republic of Ireland) Dundalk | Saint Petersburg, Russia |
| 21:00 MSK (UTC+3) | Criscito (yellow card) 41'; Giuliano 42', 78'; Lombaerts (yellow card) 86' | Report | Finn (yellow card) 43'; Horgan 52'; B.Gartland (yellow card) 71'; McEleney (yellow card) 81'; O'Donnell (yellow card) 88' | Stadium: Petrovsky Stadium; Attendance: 17,723; Referee: Luca Banti (Italy) |

| 24 November 2016 5 | Zenit St.Petersburg (Russia) | 2 – 0 | (Israel) Maccabi Tel Aviv | Saint Petersburg, Russia |
| 19:00 MSK (UTC+3) | Kokorin 44'; Criscito (yellow card) 74'; Witsel (yellow card) 79'; A. Kerzhakov 90+1' | Report | Peretz (yellow card) 83'; Yehezkel (yellow card) 88'; Igiebor (yellow card) 90' | Stadium: Petrovsky Stadium; Attendance: 15,843; Referee: Aleksandar Stavrev (Macedonia) |

| 8 December 2016 6 | AZ (Netherlands) | 3 – 2 | (Russia) Zenit St.Petersburg | Alkmaar, Netherlands |
| 21:00 MSK (UTC+3) | Rienstra 7'; Haps 43'; Bel Hassani (yellow card) 66'; Tanković 68'; Johansson (yellow card) 81' | Report | Giuliano 58'; S. Wuytens (o.g.) | Stadium: AFAS Stadion; Attendance: 13,713; Referee: Svein Oddvar Moen (Norway) |

==== Knockout stage ====
| 16 February 2017 Round of 32 1st Leg | Anderlecht (Belgium) | 2 – 0 | (Russia) Zenit St.Petersburg | Brussels, Belgium |
| 23:05 MSK (UTC+3) | Acheampong 5', 31'; Tielemans (yellow card) 17'; Thelin (yellow card) 19' | Report | Criscito (yellow card) 21' | Stadium: Constant Vanden Stock Stadium; Attendance: 13,415; Referee: Michael Oliver (England) |

| 23 February 2017 Round of 32 2nd Leg | Zenit St.Petersburg (Russia) | 3 – 1 (3 – 3 (a) agg.) | (Belgium) Anderlecht | Saint Petersburg, Russia |
| 21:00 MSK (UTC+3) | Giuliano 24', 78'; Neto (yellow card) 31'; García (yellow card) 41'; Dzyuba 72'; Lodygin (yellow card) 90+4' | Report | Tielemans (yellow card) 29'; Acheampong (yellow card) 81'; Kiese Thelin 90'; Dendoncker (yellow card) 90+2' | Stadium: Petrovsky Stadium; Attendance: 17,992; Referee: Anastasios Sidiropoulos (Greece) |

== Squad statistics ==
As of match played 21 May 2017

=== Appearances and goals ===
| No. | Pos | Nat | Player | Total | | Premier League | | Russian Cup | | Super Cup | | Europa League | |
| No. | Pos | Nat | Player | Apps | Goals | Apps | Goals | Apps | Goals | Apps | Goals | Apps | Goals |
|---|---|---|---|---|---|---|---|---|---|---|---|---|---|
| 1 | GK | (Russia) RUS | Yuri Lodygin | 25 | 0 | 14+1 | 0 | 1+1 | 0 | 1 | 0 | 7 | 0 |
| 2 | DF | (Russia) RUS | Aleksandr Anyukov | 16 | 0 | 9+1 | 0 | 2 | 0 | 0 | 0 | 4 | 0 |
| 3 | DF | (Russia) RUS | Ivan Novoseltsev | 8 | 0 | 3+2 | 0 | 0 | 0 | 0 | 0 | 2+1 | 0 |
| 4 | DF | (Italy) ITA | Domenico Criscito | 33 | 5 | 25 | 4 | 0 | 0 | 1 | 0 | 7 | 1 |
| 6 | DF | (Belgium) BEL | Nicolas Lombaerts | 15 | 0 | 6+2 | 0 | 2 | 0 | 0 | 0 | 4+1 | 0 |
| 7 | MF | (Brazil) BRA | Giuliano | 38 | 17 | 26+2 | 8 | 1+1 | 1 | 0 | 0 | 8 | 8 |
| 8 | MF | (Brazil) BRA | Maurício | 27 | 2 | 11+8 | 0 | 2 | 0 | 1 | 1 | 2+3 | 1 |
| 9 | FW | (Russia) RUS | Aleksandr Kokorin | 38 | 10 | 25+2 | 5 | 1+1 | 1 | 1 | 0 | 6+2 | 4 |
| 10 | MF | (Portugal) POR | Danny | 14 | 4 | 12 | 4 | 0 | 0 | 0 | 0 | 1+1 | 0 |
| 11 | FW | (Russia) RUS | Aleksandr Kerzhakov | 18 | 2 | 1+13 | 1 | 0 | 0 | 0+1 | 0 | 2+1 | 1 |
| 13 | DF | (Portugal) POR | Luís Neto | 35 | 0 | 22+3 | 0 | 2 | 0 | 1 | 0 | 7 | 0 |
| 14 | MF | (Russia) RUS | Artur Yusupov | 21 | 1 | 7+10 | 1 | 1 | 0 | 1 | 0 | 0+2 | 0 |
| 17 | MF | (Russia) RUS | Oleg Shatov | 25 | 4 | 13+5 | 2 | 2 | 1 | 1 | 0 | 3+1 | 1 |
| 19 | DF | (Russia) RUS | Igor Smolnikov | 20 | 0 | 17 | 0 | 0 | 0 | 1 | 0 | 2 | 0 |
| 21 | MF | (Spain) ESP | Javi García | 31 | 1 | 22 | 1 | 1 | 0 | 1 | 0 | 7 | 0 |
| 22 | FW | (Russia) RUS | Artem Dzyuba | 34 | 14 | 25+1 | 13 | 1 | 0 | 1 | 0 | 5+1 | 1 |
| 23 | DF | (Russia) RUS | Yevgeni Chernov | 7 | 0 | 4+2 | 0 | 1 | 0 | 0 | 0 | 0 | 0 |
| 24 | MF | (France) FRA | Yohan Mollo | 7 | 1 | 1+6 | 1 | 0 | 0 | 0 | 0 | 0 | 0 |
| 29 | MF | (Slovakia) SVK | Róbert Mak | 27 | 6 | 9+8 | 4 | 2 | 1 | 0 | 0 | 5+3 | 1 |
| 30 | DF | (Russia) RUS | Ibragim Tsallagov | 8 | 0 | 7+1 | 0 | 0 | 0 | 0 | 0 | 0 | 0 |
| 33 | MF | (Brazil) BRA | Hernani | 9 | 0 | 5+3 | 0 | 0 | 0 | 0 | 0 | 1 | 0 |
| 41 | GK | (Russia) RUS | Mikhail Kerzhakov | 8 | 0 | 6 | 0 | 1 | 0 | 0 | 0 | 1 | 0 |
| 48 | FW | (Russia) RUS | Aleksei Gasilin | 1 | 0 | 0 | 0 | 0+1 | 0 | 0 | 0 | 0 | 0 |
| 60 | DF | (Serbia) SRB | Branislav Ivanović | 11 | 1 | 9+1 | 1 | 0 | 0 | 0 | 0 | 1 | 0 |
| 77 | FW | (Montenegro) MNE | Luka Đorđević | 18 | 3 | 2+8 | 1 | 0+1 | 1 | 0+1 | 0 | 2+4 | 1 |
| 81 | MF | (Russia) RUS | Yuri Zhirkov | 29 | 1 | 20+1 | 1 | 1 | 0 | 0+1 | 0 | 5+1 | 0 |
| 99 | GK | (Russia) RUS | Andrey Lunyov | 10 | 0 | 10 | 0 | 0 | 0 | 0 | 0 | 0 | 0 |
Players away from the club on loan:
Players who left Zenit St.Petersburg during the season:
| 15 | MF | (Russia) RUS | Pavel Mogilevets | 2 | 0 | 0+1 | 0 | 1 | 0 | 0 | 0 | 0 | 0 |
| 24 | DF | (Argentina) ARG | Ezequiel Garay | 5 | 0 | 4 | 0 | 0 | 0 | 1 | 0 | 0 | 0 |
| 28 | MF | (Belgium) BEL | Axel Witsel | 23 | 1 | 15+1 | 1 | 0+1 | 0 | 0 | 0 | 6 | 0 |

=== Goal Scorers ===
| Place | Position | Nation | Number | Name | Premier League | Russian Cup | Super Cup | UEFA Europa League | Total |
|---|---|---|---|---|---|---|---|---|---|
| 1 | MF | (Brazil) | 7 | Giuliano | 8 | 1 | 0 | 8 | 17 |
| 2 | FW | (Russia) | 22 | Artem Dzyuba | 13 | 0 | 0 | 1 | 14 |
| 3 | FW | (Russia) | 9 | Aleksandr Kokorin | 5 | 1 | 0 | 4 | 10 |
| 4 | MF | (Slovakia) | 29 | Róbert Mak | 4 | 1 | 0 | 1 | 6 |
| 5 | DF | (Italy) | 4 | Domenico Criscito | 4 | 0 | 0 | 1 | 5 |
| 6 | MF | (Portugal) | 10 | Danny | 4 | 0 | 0 | 0 | 4 |
| 6 | MF | (Russia) | 17 | Oleg Shatov | 2 | 1 | 0 | 1 | 4 |
| 8 | FW | (Montenegro) | 77 | Luka Đorđević | 1 | 1 | 0 | 1 | 3 |
| 8 | | | | Own goal | 2 | 0 | 0 | 1 | 3 |
| 10 | FW | (Russia) | 11 | Aleksandr Kerzhakov | 1 | 0 | 0 | 1 | 2 |
| 10 | MF | (Brazil) | 8 | Maurício | 0 | 0 | 1 | 1 | 2 |
| 12 | DF | (Russia) | 81 | Yuri Zhirkov | 1 | 0 | 0 | 0 | 1 |
| 12 | MF | (Belgium) | 28 | Axel Witsel | 1 | 0 | 0 | 0 | 1 |
| 12 | MF | (Russia) | 14 | Artur Yusupov | 1 | 0 | 0 | 0 | 1 |
| 12 | DF | (Serbia) | 60 | Branislav Ivanović | 1 | 0 | 0 | 0 | 1 |
| 12 | MF | (France) | 24 | Yohan Mollo | 1 | 0 | 0 | 0 | 1 |
| 12 | MF | (Spain) | 21 | Javi García | 1 | 0 | 0 | 0 | 1 |
| | | | | TOTALS | 50 | 5 | 1 | 20 | 76 |

=== Disciplinary record ===
| Number | Nation | Position | Name | Premier League | | Russian Cup | | Super Cup | | UEFA Europa League | | Total | |
| Number | Nation | Position | Name | Yellow card | Red card | Yellow card | Red card | Yellow card | Red card | Yellow card | Red card | Yellow card | Red card |
| 1 | (Russia) | GK | Yuri Lodygin | 0 | 0 | 0 | 0 | 1 | 0 | 1 | 0 | 2 | 0 |
| 2 | (Russia) | DF | Aleksandr Anyukov | 0 | 0 | 0 | 0 | 0 | 0 | 1 | 0 | 1 | 0 |
| 4 | (Italy) | DF | Domenico Criscito | 10 | 0 | 0 | 0 | 1 | 0 | 4 | 0 | 15 | 0 |
| 6 | (Belgium) | DF | Nicolas Lombaerts | 1 | 1 | 0 | 0 | 0 | 0 | 1 | 0 | 2 | 1 |
| 7 | (Brazil) | MF | Giuliano | 1 | 0 | 0 | 1 | 0 | 0 | 0 | 0 | 1 | 1 |
| 8 | (Brazil) | MF | Maurício | 1 | 0 | 0 | 0 | 1 | 0 | 0 | 0 | 2 | 0 |
| 9 | (Russia) | FW | Aleksandr Kokorin | 3 | 0 | 1 | 0 | 1 | 0 | 1 | 0 | 6 | 0 |
| 10 | (Portugal) | MF | Danny | 1 | 0 | 0 | 0 | 0 | 0 | 0 | 0 | 1 | 0 |
| 13 | (Portugal) | DF | Luís Neto | 10 | 1 | 1 | 0 | 0 | 0 | 3 | 0 | 14 | 1 |
| 14 | (Russia) | MF | Artur Yusupov | 6 | 1 | 0 | 0 | 0 | 0 | 0 | 0 | 6 | 1 |
| 17 | (Russia) | MF | Oleg Shatov | 3 | 1 | 0 | 0 | 1 | 0 | 1 | 0 | 5 | 1 |
| 19 | (Russia) | DF | Igor Smolnikov | 3 | 0 | 0 | 0 | 0 | 0 | 0 | 0 | 3 | 0 |
| 21 | (Spain) | MF | Javi García | 8 | 0 | 0 | 0 | 0 | 0 | 4 | 0 | 12 | 0 |
| 22 | (Russia) | FW | Artem Dzyuba | 5 | 0 | 0 | 0 | 0 | 0 | 0 | 0 | 5 | 0 |
| 28 | (Belgium) | MF | Axel Witsel | 5 | 0 | 1 | 0 | 0 | 0 | 2 | 0 | 8 | 0 |
| 30 | (Russia) | DF | Ibragim Tsallagov | 1 | 0 | 0 | 0 | 0 | 0 | 0 | 0 | 1 | 0 |
| 33 | (Brazil) | MF | Hernani | 2 | 0 | 0 | 0 | 0 | 0 | 0 | 0 | 2 | 0 |
| 41 | (Russia) | GK | Mikhail Kerzhakov | 0 | 0 | 0 | 1 | 0 | 0 | 0 | 0 | 0 | 1 |
| 48 | (Russia) | FW | Aleksei Gasilin | 0 | 0 | 1 | 0 | 0 | 0 | 0 | 0 | 1 | 0 |
| 77 | (Montenegro) | FW | Luka Đorđević | 2 | 0 | 0 | 0 | 0 | 0 | 0 | 0 | 2 | 0 |
| 81 | (Russia) | DF | Yuri Zhirkov | 3 | 0 | 1 | 0 | 0 | 0 | 0 | 0 | 4 | 0 |
| | | | TOTALS | 65 | 4 | 5 | 2 | 5 | 0 | 18 | 0 | 93 | 6 |

== Notes ==
1. Maccabi Tel Aviv play their home matches at Netanya Stadium, Netanya instead of their regular stadium, Bloomfield Stadium, Tel Aviv.
1. Dundalk play their home matches at Tallaght Stadium, Dublin instead of their regular stadium, Oriel Park, Dundalk.
