= List of Russian football transfers winter 2016–17 =

This is a list of Russian football transfers in the 2016–17 winter transfer window by club. Only clubs of the 2016–17 Russian Premier League are included.

== Russian Premier League 2016–17 ==
=== Amkar Perm ===
In: Note: Flags indicate national team as defined under FIFA eligibility rules; some limited exceptions apply. Players may hold more than one non-FIFA nationality.

No.	Pos.	Nation	Player
17	FW	RUS	Aleksei Gasilin (from Zenit St. Petersburg)
37	DF	RUS	Nikolai Tarasov
40	MF	RUS	Vladislav Razdelkin (from Spartak Moscow)
41	GK	RUS	Roman Pshukov (free agent, with Rostov until June 2016)
94	DF	RUS	Aleksandr Bushmin (from (Lithuania) Atlantas)
95	GK	RUS	Denis Vambolt (from Baltika Kaliningrad)
99	FW	UKR	Oleh Mishchenko (end of loan to (Ukraine) Illichivets Mariupol)

Out: Note: Flags indicate national team as defined under FIFA eligibility rules; some limited exceptions apply. Players may hold more than one non-FIFA nationality.

No.	Pos.	Nation	Player
14	DF	RUS	Georgi Dzhikiya (to Spartak Moscow)
57	GK	RUS	Aleksandr Selikhov (to Spartak Moscow)
—	DF	ARM	Robert Arzumanyan (released, previously on loan to (Kazakhstan) Shakhter Karagandy)
—	DF	RUS	Soslan Takazov (on loan to Volgar Astrakhan, previously on loan to Tyumen)
—	MF	RUS	Ivan Belikov (on loan to (Belarus) Naftan Novopolotsk, previously on loan to Afips Afipsky)

=== Anzhi Makhachkala ===
In: Note: Flags indicate national team as defined under FIFA eligibility rules; some limited exceptions apply. Players may hold more than one non-FIFA nationality.

No.	Pos.	Nation	Player
2	DF	RUS	Guram Tetrashvili (from Tosno)
4	MF	UKR	Maksym Bilyi (from (Croatia) Hajduk Split)
5	DF	RUS	Aleksandr Zhirov (on loan from Krasnodar)
6	MF	IRI	Saeid Ezatolahi (on loan from Rostov)
7	DF	RUS	Kamil Agalarov
8	MF	RUS	Arsen Khubulov (from Kuban Krasnodar)
9	FW	RUS	Shamil Asildarov (from (Kazakhstan) Tobol)
10	MF	RUS	Adlan Katsayev (from SKA-Khabarovsk)
13	MF	RUS	Dmitri Kudryashov
14	DF	RUS	Aslan Dudiyev (from Tom Tomsk)
19	FW	RUS	Pavel Dolgov (from Zenit St. Petersburg)
21	MF	RUS	Maksim Batov (from Rubin Kazan)
39	MF	RUS	Kamil Zakirov (from Krasnodar)
45	DF	FRA	Thomas Phibel (from (Serbia) Red Star Belgrade)
52	FW	RUS	Arsanbeg Murtazaliyev (from UOR Dagestan Kaspiysk)
54	FW	RUS	Gamid Agalarov (from own academy)
56	MF	RUS	Nikita Adamov
58	FW	RUS	Shamil Murtuzaliyev (from Zenit St. Petersburg academy)
64	DF	RUS	Alikadi Saidov (from own academy)
72	FW	RUS	Ivan Ivanchenko (from Zenit St. Petersburg)
76	MF	RUS	Gadzhi Adzhiyev (from Dynamo Bryansk)
77	MF	RUS	Ayaz Guliyev (on loan from Spartak Moscow)
78	GK	RUS	Dmitri Gerasimov (from CSKA Moscow)
81	DF	RUS	Rustam Machilov (from own academy)
85	GK	RUS	Aleksandr Filtsov (on loan from Rubin Kazan)
88	GK	RUS	Yuri Shleyev (from Mashuk-KMV Pyatigorsk)
90	MF	RUS	Andrei Lyakh (free agent)
92	DF	RUS	Sergei Bryzgalov (from Terek Grozny)
94	FW	CRC	Felicio Brown Forbes (on loan from Arsenal Tula)
99	FW	RUS	Aleksandr Prudnikov (from Orenburg)
—	GK	RUS	Mekhti Dzhenetov (end of loan to Baltika Kaliningrad)

Out: Note: Flags indicate national team as defined under FIFA eligibility rules; some limited exceptions apply. Players may hold more than one non-FIFA nationality.

No.	Pos.	Nation	Player
3	DF	RUS	Ali Gadzhibekov (to Krylia Sovetov Samara)
4	DF	SRB	Darko Lazić (to (Turkey) Alanyaspor)
6	MF	ARM	Karlen Mkrtchyan
8	MF	NED	Lorenzo Ebecilio (to (Cyprus) APOEL)
10	MF	CRO	Ivo Iličević (to (Kazakhstan) Kairat)
13	MF	GHA	Mohammed Rabiu
14	MF	KOS	Bernard Berisha (to Terek Grozny)
18	MF	BLR	Ivan Mayewski (to (Kazakhstan) Astana)
20	MF	NIG	Amadou Moutari (to (Hungary) Ferencváros)
21	DF	CAF	Cédric Yambéré (end of loan from (France) Bordeaux)
25	DF	GHA	Jonathan Mensah (to (United States) Columbus Crew)
31	GK	RUS	Aleksandr Belenov (to Ufa)
45	DF	RUS	Narula Dzharulayev
47	MF	RUS	Tamirlan Dzhamalutdinov
61	DF	RUS	Anton Belov (on loan to Zenit Penza)
77	DF	RUS	Georgi Tigiyev (on loan to Spartak Moscow)
88	MF	RUS	Anvar Gazimagomedov (to Armavir)
94	FW	CIV	Yannick Boli (to (China) Dalian Yifang)
99	MF	FRA	Gabriel Obertan (to (England) Wigan Athletic)

=== Arsenal Tula ===
In: Note: Flags indicate national team as defined under FIFA eligibility rules; some limited exceptions apply. Players may hold more than one non-FIFA nationality.

No.	Pos.	Nation	Player
9	DF	RUS	Kirill Kombarov (from Tom Tomsk)
13	DF	ZAM	Stoppila Sunzu (on loan from (China) Shanghai Shenhua)
19	FW	ARG	Federico Rasic (from (Argentina) Gimnasia y Esgrima)
25	GK	RUS	Vladimir Gabulov (free agent)
26	MF	MLI	Moussa Doumbia (on loan from Rostov)
42	MF	RUS	Atsamaz Torchinov
43	DF	RUS	Konstantin Markin
53	FW	RUS	Aslanbek Sikoyev
54	MF	RUS	Daniil Zuyev
56	DF	RUS	Boris Samoylov
61	DF	GEO	Gia Grigalava (from (Cyprus) Ethnikos Achna)
62	MF	ROU	Alexandru Bourceanu (from (Romania) Steaua București)
67	DF	RUS	Aleksandr Tsogoyev
68	DF	RUS	Nikita Melnikov (from LFK Lokomotiv Moscow)
76	MF	RUS	Maksim Zhumabekov (from Vityaz Podolsk)
79	MF	RUS	Danila Buranov (from (Belarus) Belshina Bobruisk)
83	DF	RUS	Kirill Merkotan
86	DF	BUL	Ivan Ivanov (from (Greece) Panathinaikos)
98	MF	BUL	Mihail Aleksandrov (from (Poland) Legia Warsaw)

Out: Note: Flags indicate national team as defined under FIFA eligibility rules; some limited exceptions apply. Players may hold more than one non-FIFA nationality.

No.	Pos.	Nation	Player
1	GK	RUS	Roman Gerus
3	DF	RUS	Igor Kaleshin (to Sochi)
4	DF	RUS	Dmitry Aydov
8	MF	RUS	Aleksandr Sheshukov (to Baltika Kaliningrad)
10	FW	CRC	Felicio Brown Forbes (on loan to Anzhi Makhachkala)
11	FW	RUS	Khyzyr Appayev (to (Latvia) Riga)
14	FW	RUS	Sergey Maslov
16	MF	GHA	Emmanuel Frimpong (to (Sweden) AFC Eskilstuna)
22	DF	SVK	Lukáš Tesák
23	FW	RUS	Ruslan Mukhametshin (to (Kazakhstan) Taraz)
24	MF	RUS	Dmitri Smirnov
29	DF	RUS	Aleksandr Gorbatyuk (to Tambov)
32	MF	RUS	Andrei Gorbanets (to (Kazakhstan) Taraz)
37	DF	RUS	Pavel Kaloshin (to FSC Dolgoprudny-2)
55	MF	RUS	Vladimir Mikhaylov
63	MF	RUS	Vladimir Pestryachyov
64	MF	RUS	Ernest Lukiv
73	MF	RUS	Renat Gagity (to Spartak Vladikavkaz)
77	GK	RUS	Aleksandr Filtsov (end of loan from Rubin Kazan)
81	MF	RUS	Dmitri Shilov (to Tekstilshchik Ivanovo)
89	MF	RUS	Sergei Shapovalov
90	MF	RUS	Nikolai Izvekov
93	GK	RUS	Aleksei Skornyakov (to Torpedo Moscow)

=== CSKA Moscow ===
In: Note: Flags indicate national team as defined under FIFA eligibility rules; some limited exceptions apply. Players may hold more than one non-FIFA nationality.

No.	Pos.	Nation	Player
5	DF	RUS	Viktor Vasin (end of loan to Ufa)
20	MF	BRA	Vitinho (end of loan to (Brazil) Internacional)
22	FW	SWE	Alibek Aliev (end of loan to (Sweden) GAIS)
48	FW	LAT	Oskars Rubenis (from (Latvia) Rīgas Futbola skola)
49	MF	RUS	Tigran Avanesyan
90	DF	RUS	Semyon Matviychuk (from Dynamo-2 Moscow)
91	DF	RUS	Saveliy Kozlov
92	MF	RUS	Dmitri Merenchukov
99	FW	NGR	Aaron Olanare (from (China) Guangzhou R&F)

Out: Note: Flags indicate national team as defined under FIFA eligibility rules; some limited exceptions apply. Players may hold more than one non-FIFA nationality.

No.	Pos.	Nation	Player
9	FW	CIV	Lacina Traoré (end of loan from (France) Monaco)
19	MF	LAT	Aleksandrs Cauņa
23	FW	SWE	Carlos Strandberg (to (Belgium) Club Brugge)
49	MF	RUS	Nikita Titov (to Metallurg Lipetsk)
59	DF	RUS	Roman Krivulkin (to (Belarus) Krumkachy Minsk)
73	DF	RUS	Sergei Yevtushenko (end of loan from Dynamo Moscow)
77	GK	RUS	Dmitri Gerasimov (to Anzhi Makhachkala)
79	FW	RUS	Ilya Ferapontov (to (Estonia) Narva Trans)

=== Krasnodar ===
In: Note: Flags indicate national team as defined under FIFA eligibility rules; some limited exceptions apply. Players may hold more than one non-FIFA nationality.

No.	Pos.	Nation	Player
12	DF	ECU	Cristian Ramírez (from (Hungary) Ferencváros)
15	MF	RUS	Ilya Zhigulyov (end of loan to (Moldova) Milsami Orhei)
16	MF	SWE	Viktor Claesson (from (Sweden) Elfsborg)
20	FW	RUS	Nikolay Komlichenko (end of loan to (Czech Republic) Slovan Liberec)
30	DF	RUS	Roman Shishkin (on loan from Lokomotiv Moscow)
31	GK	RUS	Sergei Yeshchenko
34	DF	RUS	Danil Pelikh
43	DF	RUS	Dmitri Ivanov
48	DF	RUS	Oleg Isayenko
68	DF	RUS	Dmitri Kotov
95	MF	RUS	Araik Ovsepyan (from Sibir Novosibirsk)

Out: Note: Flags indicate national team as defined under FIFA eligibility rules; some limited exceptions apply. Players may hold more than one non-FIFA nationality.

No.	Pos.	Nation	Player
2	MF	RUS	Marat Izmailov (released)
9	FW	BRA	Ari (on loan to Lokomotiv Moscow)
10	MF	UZB	Odil Ahmedov (to (China) SIPG)
20	MF	RUS	Amir Natkho (to Lokomotiv Moscow)
34	MF	RUS	Kamil Zakirov (to Anzhi Makhachkala)
38	MF	CIV	Kouassi Eboue (to (Scotland) Celtic)
43	FW	RUS	Daur Kvekveskiri
55	DF	POL	Artur Jędrzejczyk (to (Poland) Legia Warsaw)
64	MF	RUS	Aleksandr Morgunov (on loan to (Moldova) Milsami Orhei)
68	MF	RUS	Robert Babertsyan
73	FW	RUS	Roman Razzhivin
95	FW	RUS	Aslan Vershinin
—	DF	RUS	Aleksandr Zhirov (from Tom Tomsk, on loan to Anzhi Makhachkala)

=== Krylia Sovetov Samara ===
In: Note: Flags indicate national team as defined under FIFA eligibility rules; some limited exceptions apply. Players may hold more than one non-FIFA nationality.

No.	Pos.	Nation	Player
5	DF	RUS	Ali Gadzhibekov (from Anzhi Makhachkala)
11	MF	BLR	Alexander Hleb (from (Belarus) BATE Borisov)
16	MF	UKR	Artem Hromov (from (Ukraine) Dynamo Kyiv)
20	MF	SRB	Srđan Mijailović (from (Turkey) Kayserispor)
22	DF	RUS	Sandro Tsveiba (from (Kazakhstan) Aktobe)
27	MF	RUS	Aleksandr Zuyev (on loan from Spartak Moscow)
28	FW	RUS	Pavel Kudryashov (from Tom Tomsk)
31	DF	RUS	Georgi Zotov (from Kuban Krasnodar)
51	GK	RUS	Yegor Lyubakov
55	MF	RUS	Aleksandr Bogomolov
56	FW	RUS	Ilya Buryukin (from Lada Togliatti)
57	DF	RUS	Andrei Dubrovin
58	MF	RUS	Artyom Yezhov (from Lada Togliatti)
59	MF	RUS	Konstantin Shamayev (from Lada Togliatti)

Out: Note: Flags indicate national team as defined under FIFA eligibility rules; some limited exceptions apply. Players may hold more than one non-FIFA nationality.

No.	Pos.	Nation	Player
1	GK	RUS	Maksim Pavlov (to Lada-Togliatti)
14	MF	FRA	Yohan Mollo (to Zenit St. Petersburg)
15	DF	RUS	Ibragim Tsallagov (to Zenit St. Petersburg)
23	FW	NGR	Jerry Mbakogu (end of loan from (Italy) Carpi)
34	DF	RUS	Timofei Margasov (to Lokomotiv Moscow)
45	DF	RUS	Aleksei Kontsedalov (to Baltika Kaliningrad)
61	MF	RUS	Nikolai Kiritsa (on loan to Zenit Penza)

=== Lokomotiv Moscow ===
In: Note: Flags indicate national team as defined under FIFA eligibility rules; some limited exceptions apply. Players may hold more than one non-FIFA nationality.

No.	Pos.	Nation	Player
3	DF	RUS	Timofei Margasov (from Krylia Sovetov Samara)
8	MF	PER	Jefferson Farfán (from (United Arab Emirates) Al Jazira)
10	MF	RUS	Dmitri Loskov
21	MF	RUS	Amir Natkho (from Krasnodar)
33	DF	GEO	Solomon Kvirkvelia (on loan from Rubin Kazan)
52	MF	RUS	Sergei Makarov (end of loan to (Belarus) Minsk)
58	DF	RUS	Daniil Feoktistov
60	MF	RUS	Anton Miranchuk (end of loan to (Estonia) Levadia Tallinn)
61	FW	RUS	Islam Vagabov
62	DF	RUS	Vadim Loginov
63	GK	RUS	Dmitry Landakov (from Chertanovo Education Center)
68	MF	RUS	Georgi Kyurdzhiyev (from Yessentuki)
72	GK	RUS	Maksim Bogatyryov
77	GK	RUS	Anton Kochenkov (end of loan to Tom Tomsk)
90	FW	BRA	Ari (on loan from Krasnodar)

Out: Note: Flags indicate national team as defined under FIFA eligibility rules; some limited exceptions apply. Players may hold more than one non-FIFA nationality.

No.	Pos.	Nation	Player
15	DF	RUS	Arseny Logashov (to Tosno)
19	MF	RUS	Aleksandr Samedov (to Spartak Moscow)
45	FW	NGR	Ezekiel Henty (on loan to (United Arab Emirates) Baniyas)
49	DF	RUS	Roman Shishkin (on loan to Krasnodar)

=== Orenburg ===
In: Note: Flags indicate national team as defined under FIFA eligibility rules; some limited exceptions apply. Players may hold more than one non-FIFA nationality.

No.	Pos.	Nation	Player
3	DF	BLR	Mikhail Sivakow (from (Ukraine) Zorya Luhansk)
16	FW	SVK	Michal Ďuriš (from (Czech Republic) Viktoria Plzeň)
25	MF	RUS	Denis Makarov
27	DF	BLR	Maksim Bardachow (on loan from Tom Tomsk)
32	MF	SLO	Denis Popović (from (Poland) Wisła Kraków)
39	MF	RUS	Denis Fedenko
41	GK	RUS	Mikhail Kerzhakov (on loan from Zenit St. Petersburg)
42	DF	RUS	Maksim Kazachkov
45	FW	GEO	Elguja Lobjanidze (from (Georgia (country)) Dinamo Batumi)
48	MF	RUS	Maksim Grigoryev (on loan from Rostov)
50	MF	BLR	Stanislaw Drahun (from Dynamo Moscow)
60	MF	RUS	Danila Kozlov
80	MF	RUS	Anton Antonenko
93	FW	RUS	Mikhail Kukushkin
96	MF	RUS	Nikita Arsenyev (from Rotor Volgograd academy)
94	DF	RUS	Sergei Kovalyov

Out: Note: Flags indicate national team as defined under FIFA eligibility rules; some limited exceptions apply. Players may hold more than one non-FIFA nationality.

No.	Pos.	Nation	Player
6	MF	CIV	Yacouba Bamba
18	FW	RUS	Aleksandr Prudnikov (to Anzhi Makhachkala)
26	DF	TJK	Farkhod Vosiyev (loan to (Tajikistan) Istiklol)
34	MF	RUS	Aleksandr Katsalapov
54	DF	RUS	Vadim Bilyukov (to Nosta Novotroitsk)
57	MF	RUS	Vladimir Pereverzev
75	FW	RUS	Samat Sarsenov
88	DF	RUS	Maksim Batov (end of loan from Rubin Kazan)
90	FW	RUS	Artyom Delkin (on loan to Tambov)

=== Rostov ===
In: Note: Flags indicate national team as defined under FIFA eligibility rules; some limited exceptions apply. Players may hold more than one non-FIFA nationality.

No.	Pos.	Nation	Player
18	MF	RUS	Pavel Mogilevets (from Zenit St. Petersburg)
21	DF	RUS	Andrei Sorokin (from Sakhalin Yuzhno-Sakhalinsk)
22	DF	MNE	Marko Simić (from (Israel) Hapoel Tel Aviv)
33	FW	UKR	Marko Dević (from Rubin Kazan)
—	DF	ANG	Nandinho (from (Angola) Kabuscorp)

Out: Note: Flags indicate national team as defined under FIFA eligibility rules; some limited exceptions apply. Players may hold more than one non-FIFA nationality.

No.	Pos.	Nation	Player
3	DF	SEN	Papa Gueye (to (Kazakhstan) Aktobe)
6	MF	IRI	Saeid Ezatolahi (on loan to Anzhi Makhachkala)
9	MF	RUS	Maksim Grigoryev (on loan to Orenburg)
10	MF	MLI	Moussa Doumbia (on loan to Arsenal Tula)
14	MF	RUS	Valeri Yaroshenko (on loan to Baltika Kaliningrad)
17	DF	RUS	Dmitri Skopintsev (on loan to Baltika Kaliningrad)
31	MF	RUS	Ruslan Shapovalov (to SKA Rostov-on-Don)
57	MF	RUS	Danil Sviridov
—	GK	KAZ	Stas Pokatilov (to (Kazakhstan) Kairat, previously on loan)

=== Rubin Kazan ===
In: Note: Flags indicate national team as defined under FIFA eligibility rules; some limited exceptions apply. Players may hold more than one non-FIFA nationality.

No.	Pos.	Nation	Player
12	DF	RUS	Aleksei Karnaukhov
15	FW	RUS	Nikita Saprunov
19	MF	RUS	Vladimir Sobolev (end of loan to Neftekhimik Nizhnekamsk)
29	DF	RUS	Ruslan Shcherbin (from KAMAZ Naberezhnye Chelny academy)
65	MF	RUS	Erik Vasilyev

Out: Note: Flags indicate national team as defined under FIFA eligibility rules; some limited exceptions apply. Players may hold more than one non-FIFA nationality.

No.	Pos.	Nation	Player
5	DF	GEO	Solomon Kvirkvelia (on loan to Lokomotiv Moscow)
11	FW	UKR	Marko Dević (to Rostov)
13	DF	SWE	Emil Bergström (on loan to (Switzerland) Grasshoppers)
24	DF	RUS	Yegor Sorokin (to Neftekhimik Nizhnekamsk, previously on loan to (Kazakhstan) Aktobe)
27	MF	RUS	Magomed Ozdoyev (on loan to Terek Grozny)
56	FW	RUS	Gevorg Arutyunyan (to (Armenia) Pyunik)
64	DF	COD	Chris Mavinga (to (Canada) Toronto)
77	MF	ESP	Samu (on loan to (Spain) Leganés)
83	DF	RUS	Aleksandr Kuznetsov
84	MF	RUS	Andrei Mironov
—	GK	RUS	Aleksandr Filtsov (on loan to Anzhi Makhachkala, previously on loan to Arsenal Tula)
—	DF	RUS	Maksim Batov (to Anzhi Makhachkala, previously on loan to Orenburg)
—	DF	UKR	Andriy Pylyavskyi (on loan to (Ukraine) Zorya Luhansk, previously on loan to (Ukraine) Vorskla Poltava)
—	MF	UZB	Bobir Davlatov (to Neftekhimik Nizhnekamsk, previously on loan to (Kazakhstan) Aktobe)

=== Spartak Moscow ===
In: Note: Flags indicate national team as defined under FIFA eligibility rules; some limited exceptions apply. Players may hold more than one non-FIFA nationality.

No.	Pos.	Nation	Player
12	FW	BRA	Luiz Adriano (from (Italy) Milan)
14	DF	RUS	Georgi Dzhikiya (from Amkar Perm)
17	DF	RUS	Georgi Tigiyev (on loan from Anzhi Makhachkala)
19	MF	RUS	Aleksandr Samedov (from Lokomotiv Moscow)
21	GK	RUS	Aleksandr Selikhov (from Amkar Perm)
36	FW	ZAM	Fashion Sakala (from (Zambia) Zanaco)
49	FW	POR	Idrisa Sambú (from (Portugal) Porto B)
51	MF	RUS	Kirill Folmer
60	DF	RUS	Turgay Mokhbaliyev
61	FW	RUS	Danila Proshlyakov
66	FW	LBR	Sylvanus Nimely (from (Czech Republic) Karviná)
86	GK	RUS	Artyom Poplevchenkov
94	DF	RUS	Maksim Aktisov
95	DF	CMR	Audrey Yola Zepatta (from (Cameroon) Universal Stars)

Out: Note: Flags indicate national team as defined under FIFA eligibility rules; some limited exceptions apply. Players may hold more than one non-FIFA nationality.

No.	Pos.	Nation	Player
5	MF	BRA	Rômulo (to (Brazil) Flamengo)
17	MF	RUS	Aleksandr Zuyev (on loan to Krylia Sovetov Samara)
36	FW	RUS	Dmitri Malikov (to Olimpiyets Nizhny Novgorod)
45	DF	RUS	Aleksandr Putsko (to Ufa)
58	GK	RUS	Aleksei Kozlov
73	MF	RUS	Ayaz Guliyev (on loan to Anzhi Makhachkala)
94	DF	RUS	Andrei Shigorev (to Saturn Ramenskoye)
95	MF	RUS	Vladislav Razdelkin (to Amkar Perm)
—	FW	ARM	Yura Movsisyan (to (United States) Real Salt Lake, previously on loan)

=== Terek Grozny ===
In: Note: Flags indicate national team as defined under FIFA eligibility rules; some limited exceptions apply. Players may hold more than one non-FIFA nationality.

No.	Pos.	Nation	Player
3	DF	SVK	Norbert Gyömbér (on loan from (Italy) Roma)
27	MF	RUS	Magomed Ozdoyev (on loan from Rubin Kazan)
77	MF	KOS	Bernard Berisha (from Anzhi Makhachkala)

Out: Note: Flags indicate national team as defined under FIFA eligibility rules; some limited exceptions apply. Players may hold more than one non-FIFA nationality.

No.	Pos.	Nation	Player
3	DF	RUS	Sergei Bryzgalov (to Anzhi Makhachkala)
6	MF	BRA	Adílson (to (Brazil) Atlético Mineiro)
24	MF	RUS	Magomed-Emi Dzhabrailov (to Austria Klagenfurt)
—	DF	RUS	Dmitri Yashin (to (Belarus) Krumkachy Minsk, previously on loan)

=== Tom Tomsk ===
In: Note: Flags indicate national team as defined under FIFA eligibility rules; some limited exceptions apply. Players may hold more than one non-FIFA nationality.

No.	Pos.	Nation	Player
50	DF	RUS	Eduard Karymov
51	DF	RUS	Maksim Bobrov
52	DF	RUS	Aleksandr Andreyev
53	MF	RUS	Konstantin Antipov
54	FW	RUS	Dmitri Layev
55	FW	RUS	Denis Fomchenko
56	MF	RUS	Vladimir Lyskov
57	MF	RUS	Kirill Ilyin
58	MF	RUS	Nikolai Zarubin
59	FW	RUS	Daniil Kononenko
61	DF	RUS	Nikolai Rybin
62	GK	RUS	Danil Pshenichnikov
64	MF	RUS	Mark Borisov

Out: Note: Flags indicate national team as defined under FIFA eligibility rules; some limited exceptions apply. Players may hold more than one non-FIFA nationality.

No.	Pos.	Nation	Player
2	DF	RUS	Aleksandr Zhirov (to Krasnodar)
3	DF	RUS	Vitali Dyakov (end of loan from Dynamo Moscow)
5	MF	ROU	Eric Bicfalvi (to Ural Yekaterinburg)
6	MF	CZE	Lukáš Droppa (to (Turkey) Bandırmaspor)
8	MF	UKR	Kyrylo Kovalchuk (to (Kazakhstan) Ordabasy)
9	DF	RUS	Kirill Kombarov (to Arsenal Tula)
11	FW	UKR	Oleksandr Kasyan (to Fakel Voronezh)
14	DF	RUS	Aslan Dudiyev (to Anzhi Makhachkala)
19	DF	RUS	Pyotr Ten (to Yenisey Krasnoyarsk)
20	DF	CZE	David Jablonský (to (Bulgaria) Levski Sofia)
21	DF	BLR	Maksim Bardachow (on loan to Orenburg)
22	FW	RUS	Sergey Samodin (to Yenisey Krasnoyarsk)
23	DF	BIH	Ognjen Vranješ (to (Greece) AEK)
48	DF	RUS	Maksim Tishkin (to Baltika Kaliningrad)
77	GK	RUS	Anton Kochenkov (end of loan from Lokomotiv Moscow)
78	FW	RUS	Pavel Kudryashov (to Krylia Sovetov Samara)
99	FW	RUS	Kirill Pogrebnyak (to Zenit-2 St. Petersburg)

=== Ufa ===
In: Note: Flags indicate national team as defined under FIFA eligibility rules; some limited exceptions apply. Players may hold more than one non-FIFA nationality.

No.	Pos.	Nation	Player
5	DF	SLO	Bojan Jokić (from (Spain) Villarreal)
19	MF	CRO	Ivan Paurević (from (England) Huddersfield Town)
22	DF	MDA	Victor Patrașco (from (Moldova) Academia Chișinău)
31	GK	RUS	Aleksandr Belenov (from Anzhi Makhachkala)
45	DF	RUS	Aleksandr Putsko (from Spartak Moscow)
56	GK	RUS	Igor Ozhiganov
66	FW	RUS	Timur Kutlusurin (from Zenit Salavat)
85	DF	RUS	Damir Yunusov
93	DF	MDA	Cătălin Carp (from (Romania) Viitorul Constanța)
94	FW	RUS	Linar Mukhametshin
96	FW	RUS	Nikita Tikhonov

Out: Note: Flags indicate national team as defined under FIFA eligibility rules; some limited exceptions apply. Players may hold more than one non-FIFA nationality.

No.	Pos.	Nation	Player
5	DF	RUS	Viktor Vasin (end of loan from CSKA Moscow)
8	MF	RUS	Semyon Fomin
10	MF	BRA	Marcinho (to (Turkey) Gaziantepspor)
11	FW	BRA	Diego Carlos (to (Brazil) São Bento)
30	GK	UKR	Bohdan Sarnavskyi (to (Ukraine) Vorskla Poltava)
52	GK	RUS	Ruslan Agayev
65	MF	RUS	Maksim Lysenkov
66	FW	RUS	Ilya Blinnikov
71	GK	RUS	Andrey Lunyov (to Zenit St. Petersburg)
77	MF	RUS	Andrei Batyutin (to Zenit-2 St. Petersburg)
83	DF	RUS	Yegor Romanovsky
94	MF	RUS	Azat Valimakhmetov
95	DF	RUS	Dmitri Tashbulatov
96	MF	RUS	Renat Yusupov
97	FW	RUS	Denis Zizenkov
—	MF	RUS	Aleksandr Vasilyev (released, previously on loan to Neftekhimik Nizhnekamsk)

=== Ural Yekaterinburg ===
In: Note: Flags indicate national team as defined under FIFA eligibility rules; some limited exceptions apply. Players may hold more than one non-FIFA nationality.

No.	Pos.	Nation	Player
3	DF	GEO	Jemal Tabidze (on loan from (Belgium) Gent II)
4	DF	SLO	Gregor Balažic (from (Serbia) Partizan)
6	MF	ROU	Eric Bicfalvi (from Tom Tomsk)
17	MF	BUL	Nikolay Dimitrov (from (Bulgaria) Slavia Sofia)
18	FW	RUS	Vladimir Ilyin (from Kuban Krasnodar)
30	MF	RUS	Maksim Yashkin
31	MF	RUS	Pavel Kirillov
32	MF	RUS	Nikita Glushkov (from Sibir Novosibirsk)
34	MF	RUS	Yan Chizhkov
35	FW	RUS	Yevgeni Tatarinov
36	DF	RUS	Aleksei Fakhrutdinov
37	DF	RUS	Kirill Karabanov
50	MF	RUS	Grigori Senatorov
54	MF	RUS	Nikita Muromsky
80	MF	RUS	Aleksandr Lomakin (from Yenisey Krasnoyarsk)
99	FW	ARM	Edgar Manucharyan (from (Thailand) Ratchaburi Mitr Phol)
—	DF	RUS	Aleksei Gerasimov (end of loan to (Belarus) Belshina Bobruisk)
—	DF	RUS	Ivan Knyazev (end of loan to (Latvia) Riga)

Out: Note: Flags indicate national team as defined under FIFA eligibility rules; some limited exceptions apply. Players may hold more than one non-FIFA nationality.

No.	Pos.	Nation	Player
1	GK	RUS	Dmitri Arapov
19	FW	RUS	Valeri Kuznetsov (to Tyumen)
25	MF	KAZ	Georgy Zhukov (to (Kazakhstan) Kairat)
29	DF	ARG	Pablo Fontanello (to (Kazakhstan) Ordabasy)
86	FW	CIV	Mohamed Konaté (to (Latvia) Babīte)
94	FW	RUS	Georgi Nurov (to (Belgium) Patro Eisden)

=== Zenit Saint Petersburg ===
In: Note: Flags indicate national team as defined under FIFA eligibility rules; some limited exceptions apply. Players may hold more than one non-FIFA nationality.

No.	Pos.	Nation	Player
24	MF	FRA	Yohan Mollo (from Krylia Sovetov Samara)
27	DF	RUS	Sergei Zuykov (from Volgar Astrakhan)
30	DF	RUS	Ibragim Tsallagov (from Krylia Sovetov Samara)
33	MF	BRA	Hernani (from (Brazil) Atlético Paranaense)
35	MF	RUS	Yuri Pershin
44	MF	ENG	Jacob Gardiner-Smith
47	MF	RUS	Ruslan Kazakov
57	MF	RUS	Pavel Korkin
60	DF	SRB	Branislav Ivanović (from (England) Chelsea)
64	FW	RUS	Daniil Lesovoy (from (Ukraine) Dynamo Kyiv)
73	DF	RUS	Aleksei Plotnikov
80	GK	RUS	Mikhail Mzhelsky
82	FW	RUS	Aleksandr Yelovskikh
92	FW	RUS	Daniil Kultinov
99	GK	RUS	Andrey Lunyov (from Ufa)

Out: Note: Flags indicate national team as defined under FIFA eligibility rules; some limited exceptions apply. Players may hold more than one non-FIFA nationality.

No.	Pos.	Nation	Player
15	MF	RUS	Pavel Mogilevets (to Rostov)
26	DF	SRB	Vukašin Jovanović (on loan to (France) Bordeaux)
28	MF	BEL	Axel Witsel (to (China) Tianjin Quanjian)
36	FW	RUS	Stanislav Krapukhin (to Zenit-2 St. Petersburg)
41	GK	RUS	Mikhail Kerzhakov (on loan to Orenburg)
47	FW	RUS	Anton Zinkovskiy (end of loan from Chertanovo Moscow)
48	FW	RUS	Aleksei Gasilin (to Amkar Perm)
54	DF	RUS	Nikita Kakkoyev (to Zenit-2 St. Petersburg)
63	DF	RUS	Daniil Maykov (to (Bulgaria) Slavia Sofia)
64	FW	RUS	Daniil Lesovoy (to Zenit-2 St. Petersburg)
83	GK	RUS	Igor Obukhov (on loan to Tyumen)
85	FW	RUS	Yuri Kozlov (to Zenit-2 St. Petersburg)
88	MF	RUS	Nikita Salamatov (to SKA Rostov-on-Don)
92	FW	RUS	Pavel Dolgov (to Anzhi Makhachkala)
98	FW	RUS	Ivan Ivanchenko (to Anzhi Makhachkala)
