= Mikhail Kizeyev =

Mikhail Kizeyev may refer to:

- Mikhail Kizeyev (politician) (born 1978), Russian politician
- Mikhail Kizeyev (footballer) (born 1997), Russian footballer
