= Maksim Levin =

Russian footballer

Personal information
- Full name: Maksim Yuryevich Levin
- Date of birth: 6 May 1999 (age 27)
- Place of birth: Saint Petersburg, Russia
- Height: 1.78 m (5 ft 10 in)
- Position: Midfielder

Youth career
- –2019: Zenit Saint Petersburg

Senior career*
Years	Team	Apps	(Gls)
2018–2021	Zenit-2 Saint Petersburg	24	(3)
2021	Zenit Saint Petersburg	0	(0)
2021–2022	Zvezda Saint Petersburg	20	(1)
2022–2023	Murom	28	(6)
2023	Leningradets	5	(0)
2024	Murom	17	(0)
2024	Chayka Peschanokopskoye	7	(0)
2025	Spartak Tambov	27	(1)

International career
2015	Russia U16	3	(0)
- * Club domestic league appearances and goals as of 1 November 2025

Maksim Yuryevich Levin (Russian: Максим Юрьевич Левин; born 6 May 1999) is a Russian football player.

== Club career ==
He made his debut in the Russian Football National League for Zenit-2 Saint Petersburg on 3 March 2019 in a game against Shinnik Yaroslavl, as a 66th-minute substitute for Daniil Shamkin.

He was called up to the senior team of Zenit Saint Petersburg in February 2021 for a Russian Cup game against Arsenal Tula, but remained on the bench.

In the summer of 2022, signed a contract with Murom. On 16 July, in debut game for the new club, he scored a goal against Tekstilshchik Ivanovo.
