= Pavel Nazimov =

Russian footballer

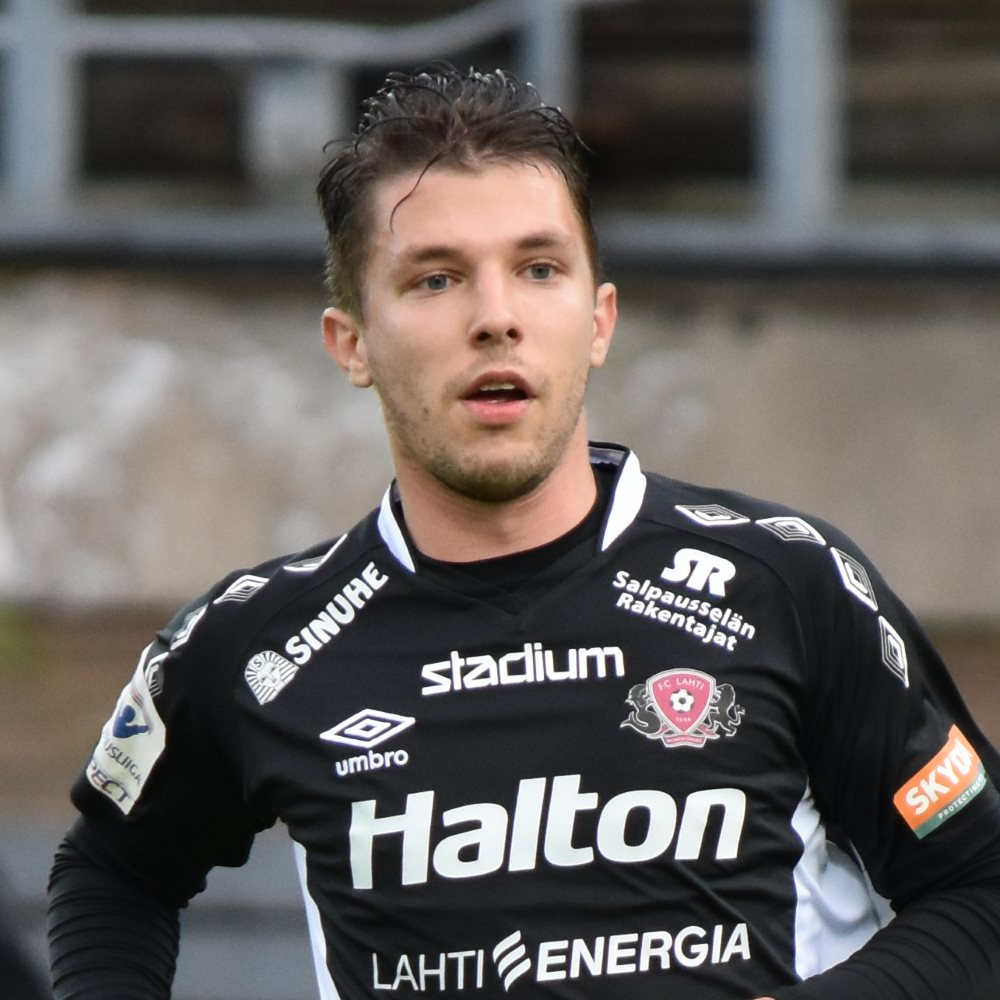
- Nazimov with Lahti in 2017

Personal information
- Full name: Pavel Viktorovich Nazimov
- Date of birth: 4 February 1996 (age 30)
- Height: 1.79 m (5 ft 10 in)
- Positions: Forward; left winger

Youth career
- Zenit Saint Petersburg

Senior career*
Years	Team	Apps	(Gls)
2013–2016	Zenit Saint Petersburg	0	(0)
2014–2016	→ Zenit-2 Saint Petersburg	8	(0)
2017	Lahti	19	(1)
2018–2019	Dynamo Stavropol	20	(3)
2020	Jippo	15	(1)
- * Club domestic league appearances and goals as of 20:57, 22 June 2020 (UTC)

Pavel Viktorovich Nazimov (Russian: Павел Викторович Назимов; born 4 February 1996) is a Russian former football player who plays for JIPPO in Finland.

== Club career ==
He made his professional debut in the Russian Professional Football League for FC Zenit-2 St. Petersburg on 18 July 2014 in a game against FC Kolomna.

== Career statistics ==
As of 13 May 2025

Appearances and goals by club, season and competition
Club	Season	League			National cup (Note: Includes Russian Cup and Suomen Cup)		Other		Total	
Club	Season	Division	Apps	Goals	Apps	Goals	Apps	Goals	Apps	Goals
Zenit-2	2014–15	Russian Second League	2	0	–		–		2	0
Zenit-2	2015–16	Russian First League	6	0	–		–		6	0
Zenit-2	Total		8	0	0	0	0	0	8	0
Lahti	2017	Veikkausliiga	19	1	2	1	–		21	2
Dynamo Stavropol	2018–19	Russian Second League	20	3	0	0	–		20	3
Jippo	2020	Kakkonen	15	1	1	0	4	2	20	3
Career total			62	5	3	1	4	2	69	8
