= Yefim Boytsov =

Russian footballer

Personal information
- Full name: Yefim Dmitriyevich Boytsov
- Date of birth: 22 June 1999 (age 27)
- Place of birth: Saint Petersburg, Russia
- Height: 1.79 m (5 ft 10 in)
- Position: Midfielder

Youth career
- –2018: FC Zenit Saint Petersburg

Senior career*
Years	Team	Apps	(Gls)
2018–2019	FC Khimki	0	(0)
2018–2019	→ FC Khimki-M	24	(1)
2019–2020	FC Kolomna	17	(1)
2020	FC Zvezda Saint Petersburg	12	(0)
2021–2022	FC Akron Tolyatti	14	(0)
2021	→ FC Irtysh Omsk (loan)	12	(0)
- * Club domestic league appearances and goals as of 27 November 2022

Yefim Dmitriyevich Boytsov (Russian: Ефим Дмитриевич Бойцов; born 22 June 1999) is a Russian football player.

== Club career ==
He made his debut in the Russian Football National League for FC Akron Tolyatti on 3 April 2021 in a game against FC Tom Tomsk.
