= Igor Obukhov =

Russian footballer

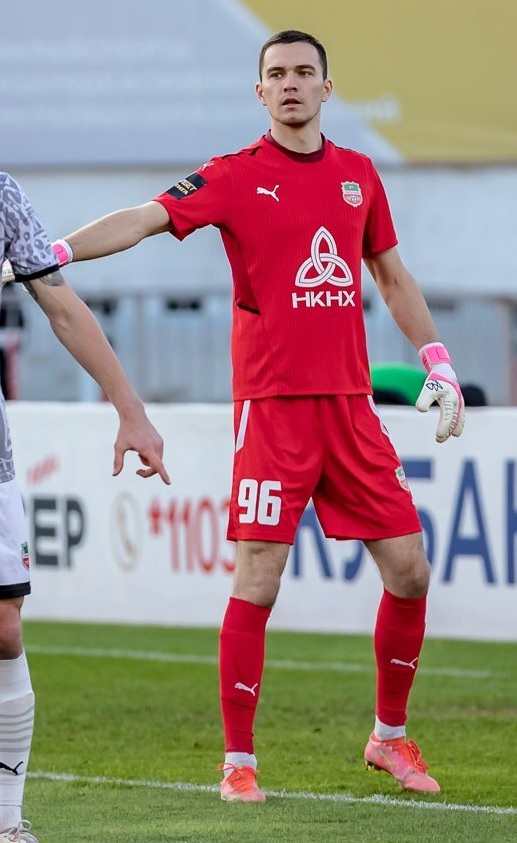
- Obukhov with Neftekhimik in 2022

Personal information
- Full name: Igor Andreyevich Obukhov
- Date of birth: 29 May 1996 (age 30)
- Place of birth: Saint Petersburg, Russia
- Height: 1.95 m (6 ft 5 in)
- Position: Goalkeeper

Team information
- Current team: Fakel Voronezh
- Number: 96

Youth career
- Zenit St. Petersburg

Senior career*
Years	Team	Apps	(Gls)
2013–2016	Zenit-2 St. Petersburg	42	(0)
2016–2020	Zenit St. Petersburg	0	(0)
2017	→ Tyumen (loan)	28	(0)
2018	→ Arsenal Tula (loan)	1	(0)
2018–2019	→ Tyumen (loan)	6	(0)
2019–2020	→ SKA-Khabarovsk (loan)	20	(0)
2020	SKA-Khabarovsk	22	(0)
2021–2022	Rotor Volgograd	29	(0)
2022–2023	Neftekhimik Nizhnekamsk	22	(0)
2023–2025	Khimki	32	(0)
2025–	Fakel Voronezh	18	(0)

International career^{‡}
2013	Russia U-17	1	(0)
2017–2018	Russia U-21	3	(0)
- * Club domestic league appearances and goals as of 7 November 2026 ‡ National team caps and goals as of 27 March 2018

Igor Andreyevich Obukhov (Russian: Игорь Андреевич Обухов; born 29 May 1996) is a Russian football player who plays as a goalkeeper for Fakel Voronezh.

== Club career ==
Obukhov made his professional debut in the Russian Professional Football League for Zenit-2 St. Petersburg on 8 November 2013 in a game against Dolgoprudny.

He made his Russian Premier League debut for Arsenal Tula in a game against CSKA Moscow on 6 May 2018, in which he allowed 6 goals.

On 20 June 2019, Obukhov joined SKA-Khabarovsk.

On 28 January 2021, SKA-Khabarovsk announced that Obukhov will return to the Russian Premier League by moving to Rotor Volgograd.

== International ==
He participated in the 2013 FIFA U-17 World Cup with Russia national under-17 football team.

== Career statistics ==
As of match played 7 November 2026

Appearances and goals by club, season and competition
Club	Season	League			Cup		Europe		Other		Total	
Club	Season	Division	Apps	Goals	Apps	Goals	Apps	Goals	Apps	Goals	Apps	Goals
Zenit-2 St. Petersburg	2013–14	Russian Second League	10	0	—		—		—		10	0
Zenit-2 St. Petersburg	2014–15	Russian Second League	15	0	—		—		—		15	0
Zenit-2 St. Petersburg	2015–16	Russian First League	17	0	—		—		1 (Note: Appearances in FNL Cup)	0	18	0
Zenit-2 St. Petersburg	2016–17	Russian First League	0	0	—		—		—		0	0
Zenit-2 St. Petersburg	Total		42	0	0	0	0	0	1	0	43	0
Zenit St. Petersburg	2015–16	Russian Premier League	0	0	0	0	0	0	0	0	0	0
Zenit St. Petersburg	2016–17	Russian Premier League	0	0	0	0	0	0	0	0	0	0
Zenit St. Petersburg	Total		0	0	0	0	0	0	0	0	0	0
Tyumen (loan)	2016–17	Russian First League	6	0	—		—		2	0	8	0
Tyumen (loan)	2017–18	Russian First League	22	0	1	0	—		—		23	0
Tyumen (loan)	Total		28	0	1	0	0	0	2	0	31	0
Arsenal Tula (loan)	2017–18	Russian Premier League	1	0	—		—		—		1	0
Tyumen (loan)	2018–19	Russian First League	6	0	1	0	—		—		7	0
SKA-Khabarovsk (loan)	2019–20	Russian First League	20	0	1	0	—		—		21	0
SKA-Khabarovsk	2020–21	Russian First League	22	0	0	0	—		—		22	0
Rotor Volgograd	2020–21	Russian Premier League	0	0	—		—		—		0	0
Rotor Volgograd	2021–22	Russian First League	29	0	2	0	—		—		31	0
Rotor Volgograd	Total		29	0	2	0	0	0	0	0	31	0
Neftekhimik Nizhnekamsk	2022–23	Russian First League	22	0	1	0	—		—		23	0
Khimki	2023–24	Russian First League	23	0	2	0	—		—		25	0
Khimki	2024–25	Russian Premier League	9	0	3	0	—		—		12	0
Khimki	Total		32	0	5	0	0	0	0	0	37	0
Fakel Voronezh	2025–26	Russian First League	14	0	1	0	—		—		15	0
Fakel Voronezh	2026–27	Russian Premier League	4	0	3	0	—		—		7	0
Fakel Voronezh	Total		18	0	4	0	0	0	0	0	22	0
Career total			220	0	15	0	0	0	3	0	238	0
