= Aleksey Plotnikov =

Russian footballer

Personal information
- Full name: Aleksey Alekseyevich Plotnikov
- Date of birth: 31 July 1998 (age 28)
- Place of birth: Saint Petersburg, Russia
- Height: 1.94 m (6 ft 4 in)
- Position: Defender

Youth career
- 2016–2019: Zenit St. Petersburg

Senior career*
Years	Team	Apps	(Gls)
2018–2019	Zenit-2 St. Petersburg	7	(0)
2019–2020	Zvezda St. Petersburg	0	(0)
2020–2021	Smolensk	25	(3)
2021–2022	Zvezda St. Petersburg	26	(3)
2022–2023	Dynamo St. Petersburg	22	(1)
2024	Amkar Perm	12	(0)
- * Club domestic league appearances and goals as of 19 October 2024

Aleksey Alekseyevich Plotnikov (Russian: Алексей Алексеевич Плотников; born 31 July 1998) is a Russian footballer.

== Club career ==
He made his debut in the Russian Football National League for Zenit-2 St. Petersburg on 24 March 2018 in a game against Fakel Voronezh.
