= Yuri Kozlov =

Russian footballer

Personal information
- Full name: Yuri Andreyevich Kozlov
- Date of birth: 18 July 1998 (age 28)
- Place of birth: Ishimbay, Russia
- Height: 1.78 m (5 ft 10 in)
- Position: Forward

Youth career
- –2015: FC Ufa
- 2015–2016: Zenit Salavat
- 2016–2017: FC Zenit Saint Petersburg

Senior career*
Years	Team	Apps	(Gls)
2018–2019	FC Zenit-2 Saint Petersburg	1	(0)
2019–2020	FC Ufa-2	15	(0)
2020	FC Avangard Kursk	0	(0)
- * Club domestic league appearances and goals

Yuri Andreyevich Kozlov (Russian: Юрий Андреевич Козлов; born 18 July 1998) is a Russian former football player.

== Club career ==
He made his debut in the Russian Football National League for FC Zenit-2 Saint Petersburg on 24 November 2018 in a game against FC Avangard Kursk.
