= Aleksei Gasilin =

Russian footballer

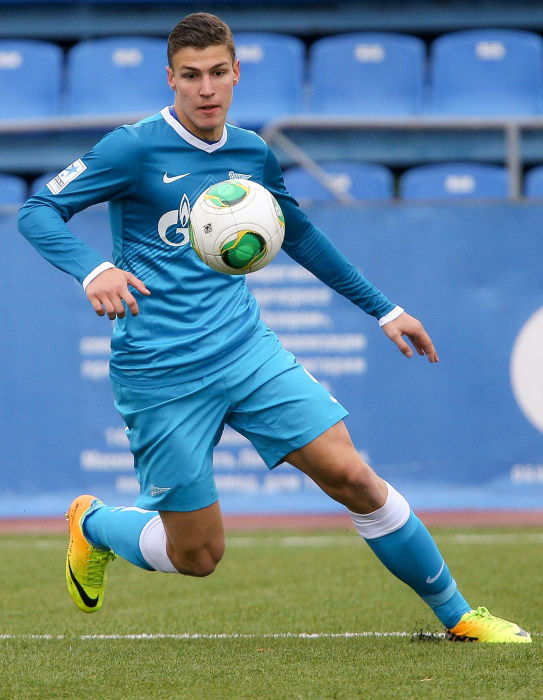

Personal information
- Full name: Aleksei Yevgenyevich Gasilin
- Date of birth: 1 March 1996 (age 30)
- Place of birth: Saint Petersburg, Russia
- Height: 1.83 m (6 ft 0 in)
- Position: Forward

Team information
- Current team: FC Amkal Moscow

Youth career
- DYuSSh Smena-Zenit

Senior career*
Years	Team	Apps	(Gls)
2013–2016	FC Zenit Saint Petersburg	1	(0)
2015–2016	→ FC Schalke 04 II (loan)	33	(14)
2016–2017	→ FC Zenit-2 Saint Petersburg	19	(8)
2017–2018	FC Amkar Perm	19	(0)
2018–2019	Académico de Viseu	9	(1)
2019–2020	FC Tom Tomsk	18	(2)
2019–2020	→ FC Zenit-2 Saint Petersburg (loan)	12	(7)
2020	FC Volgar Astrakhan	15	(1)
2021	FC Zvezda Saint Petersburg	8	(7)
2021	Ermis Aradippou	0	(0)
2021	FC Leningradets Leningrad Oblast	7	(2)
2022–	FC Amkal Moscow (amateur)		

International career
2012	Russia U-16	1	(0)
2013	Russia U-17	7	(1)
2014	Russia U-18	4	(1)
2014–2015	Russia U-19	9	(3)
2015–2018	Russia U-21	12	(3)
- * Club domestic league appearances and goals

Aleksei Yevgenyevich Gasilin (Russian: Алексей Евгеньевич Гасилин; born 1 March 1996) is a Russian professional footballer who plays as a striker for FC Amkal Moscow.

== Club career ==
He made his debut in the Russian Premier League on 26 May 2013 for FC Zenit St. Petersburg in a game against FC Amkar Perm.

On 24 February 2017, he signed a 3.5-year contract with FC Amkar Perm.

Following the bankruptcy of Amkar, he signed with the Portuguese club Académico de Viseu on 2 July 2018.

On 8 February 2019, he signed a 1.5-year contract with FC Tom Tomsk.

On 29 August 2019, he returned to FC Zenit-2 Saint Petersburg on loan.

On 5 June 2020, he signed with FC Volgar Astrakhan.

Gasilin announced his retirement from professional football on 27 February 2022. He then joined FC Amkal Moscow on amateur levels.

== International ==
He won the 2013 UEFA European Under-17 Football Championship with Russia, scoring a penalty shoot-out goal in the semi-final. He also participated in the 2013 FIFA U-17 World Cup.

Later he represented Russia national under-19 football team at the 2015 UEFA European Under-19 Championship, where Russia came in second.

== Career statistics ==
=== Club ===
As of 20 May 2018

Club	Season	League			Cup		Continental		Total	
Club	Season	Division	Apps	Goals	Apps	Goals	Apps	Goals	Apps	Goals
Zenit St. Petersburg	2012–13	Russian Premier League	1	0	0	0	0	0	1	0
Zenit St. Petersburg	2013–14	Russian Premier League	0	0	0	0	0	0	0	0
Zenit St. Petersburg	2014–15	Russian Premier League	0	0	0	0	0	0	0	0
Schalke 04 II	2015–16	Regionalliga West	33	14	–		–		33	14
Zenit St. Petersburg	2016–17	Russian Premier League	0	0	1	0	0	0	1	0
Zenit St. Petersburg	Total (2 spells)		1	0	1	0	0	0	2	0
Zenit-2 St. Petersburg	2016–17	FNL	19	8	–		–		19	8
Amkar Perm	2016–17	Russian Premier League	13	0	–		–		13	0
Amkar Perm	2017–18	Russian Premier League	6	0	0	0	–		6	0
Amkar Perm	Total		19	0	0	0	0	0	19	0
Career total			72	22	1	0	0	0	73	22
