= Daniil Lesovoy =

Russian footballer (born 1998)

Daniil Lesovoy Дании́л Лесово́й
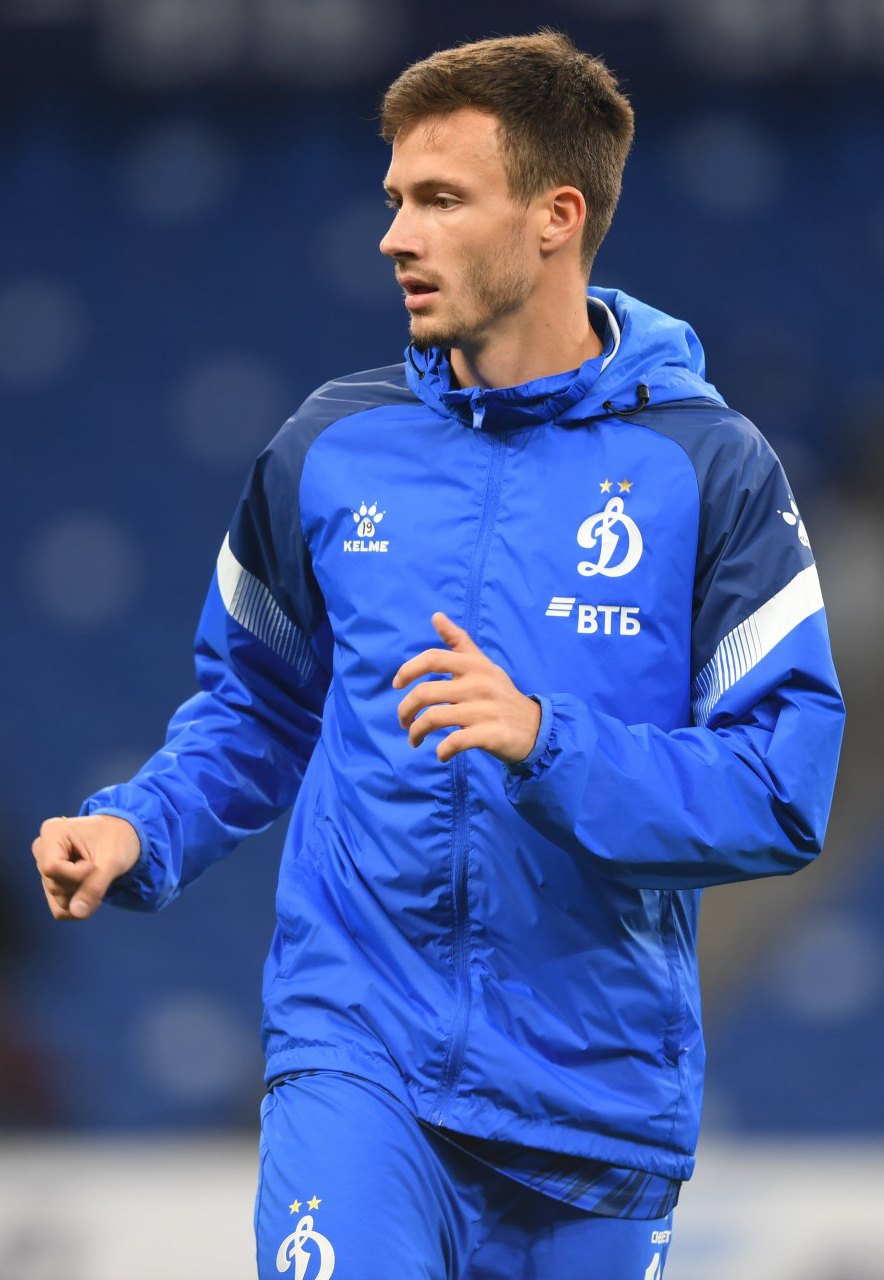
- Lesovoy with Dynamo Moscow in 2020

Personal information
- Full name: Daniil Olegovich Lesovoy
- Date of birth: 12 January 1998 (age 28)
- Place of birth: Moscow, Russia
- Height: 1.76 m (5 ft 9 in)
- Position: Left winger

Team information
- Current team: Dynamo Makhachkala (on loan from Nizhny Novgorod)
- Number: 88

Youth career
- 2004–2016: Dynamo Kyiv
- 2016–2017: Zenit St. Petersburg

Senior career*
Years	Team	Apps	(Gls)
2017–2020	Zenit-2 St. Petersburg	32	(1)
2018–2020	→ Arsenal Tula (loan)	36	(5)
2020	Arsenal Tula	10	(2)
2020–2025	Dynamo Moscow	51	(5)
2024	→ Maccabi Haifa (loan)	5	(0)
2024–2025	→ AEL Limassol (loan)	28	(4)
2025–	Nizhny Novgorod	25	(3)
2026–	→ Dynamo Makhachkala (loan)	14	(2)

International career^{‡}
2014	Ukraine U16	10	(3)
2014–2015	Ukraine U17	15	(3)
2018–2019	Russia U20	6	(1)
2019–2021	Russia U21	10	(1)
- * Club domestic league appearances and goals as of 22 November 2026 ‡ National team caps and goals as of 31 March 2021

Daniil Olegovich Lesovoy (Russian: Дании́л Оле́гович Лесово́й; Ukrainian: Даніїл Олегович Лісовий; tr. Daniil Olehovych Lisovyi; born 12 January 1998) is a professional footballer who plays as a left winger for Dynamo Makhachkala on loan from Nizhny Novgorod. Born in Russia, he represented Ukraine internationally on youth levels before switching allegiance back to Russia.

== Club career ==
Born in Moscow, Russia, Lesovoy moved to Prague, Czech Republic at early age, and later moved to Kyiv, Ukraine.

He made his debut in the Russian Football National League for Zenit-2 St. Petersburg on 18 March 2017 in a game against Spartak Nalchik.

On 28 July 2018, he joined Arsenal Tula on loan for the 2018–19 season.

On 4 July 2019, the loan was extended for the 2019–20 season.

On 3 July 2020, Arsenal used their purchase option in the loan contract and signed a 3-year contract with Lesovoy.

On 7 September 2020, he signed a five-year contract with Dynamo Moscow. On 7 August 2021, he underwent a knee surgery which left him unable to play until 2022.

On 2 February 2024, Lesovoy joined Maccabi Haifa in Israel on loan with an option to buy.

On 1 August 2024, Lesovoy was loaned to AEL Limassol in Cyprus for the 2024–25 season.

On 17 July 2025, Lesovoy signed a three-year contract with Pari Nizhny Novgorod. On 11 July 2026, he was loaned by Dynamo Makhachkala for the 2026–27 season.

== International career ==
After representing Ukraine on under-16 and under-17 level, he debuted for Russia national under-20 football team in September 2018.

In November 2020, he was called up to the Russia national football team for the first time for the games against Moldova, Turkey and Serbia.

On 11 May 2021, he was named as a back-up player for Russia's UEFA Euro 2020 squad.

== Personal life ==
His great-grandfather Leonid Kostandov was the minister of the chemical industry of the Soviet Union and was interred at the Kremlin Wall Necropolis.

== Career statistics ==
=== Club ===
As of match played 22 November 2026

Appearances and goals by club, season and competition
Club	Season	League			Cup		Continental		Other		Total	
Club	Season	Division	Apps	Goals	Apps	Goals	Apps	Goals	Apps	Goals	Apps	Goals
Zenit-2 St. Petersburg	2016–17	Russian First League	8	0	—		—		4 (Note: Appearances in the FNL Cup)	1	12	1
Zenit-2 St. Petersburg	2017–18	Russian First League	24	1	—		—		—		24	1
Zenit-2 St. Petersburg	Total		32	1	0	0	0	0	4	1	36	2
Arsenal Tula	2018–19	Russian Premier League	13	2	4	0	—		—		17	2
Arsenal Tula	2019–20	Russian Premier League	27	3	2	0	2 (Note: Appearances in UEFA Europa League)	0	—		31	3
Arsenal Tula	2020–21	Russian Premier League	6	2	—		—		—		6	2
Arsenal Tula	Total		46	7	6	0	2	0	0	0	54	7
Dynamo Moscow	2020–21	Russian Premier League	22	5	2	0	1	0	—		25	5
Dynamo Moscow	2021–22	Russian Premier League	8	0	4	0	—		—		12	0
Dynamo Moscow	2022–23	Russian Premier League	13	0	9	0	—		—		22	0
Dynamo Moscow	2023–24	Russian Premier League	8	0	5	0	—		—		13	0
Dynamo Moscow	2024–25	Russian Premier League	0	0	0	0	—		—		0	0
Dynamo Moscow	Total		51	5	20	0	1	0	0	0	72	5
Maccabi Haifa (loan)	2023–24	Israeli Premier League	5	0	2	0	2 (Note: Appearances in UEFA Conference League)	0	—		9	0
AEL Limassol (loan)	2024–25	Cypriot First Division	28	4	2	1	—		—		30	5
Pari Nizhny Novgorod	2025–26	Russian Premier League	25	3	4	0	—		—		29	3
Dynamo Makhachkala (loan)	2026–27	Russian Premier League	14	2	3	0	—		—		17	2
Career total			201	22	37	1	5	0	4	1	247	24
