= Nikita Salamatov =

Russian footballer

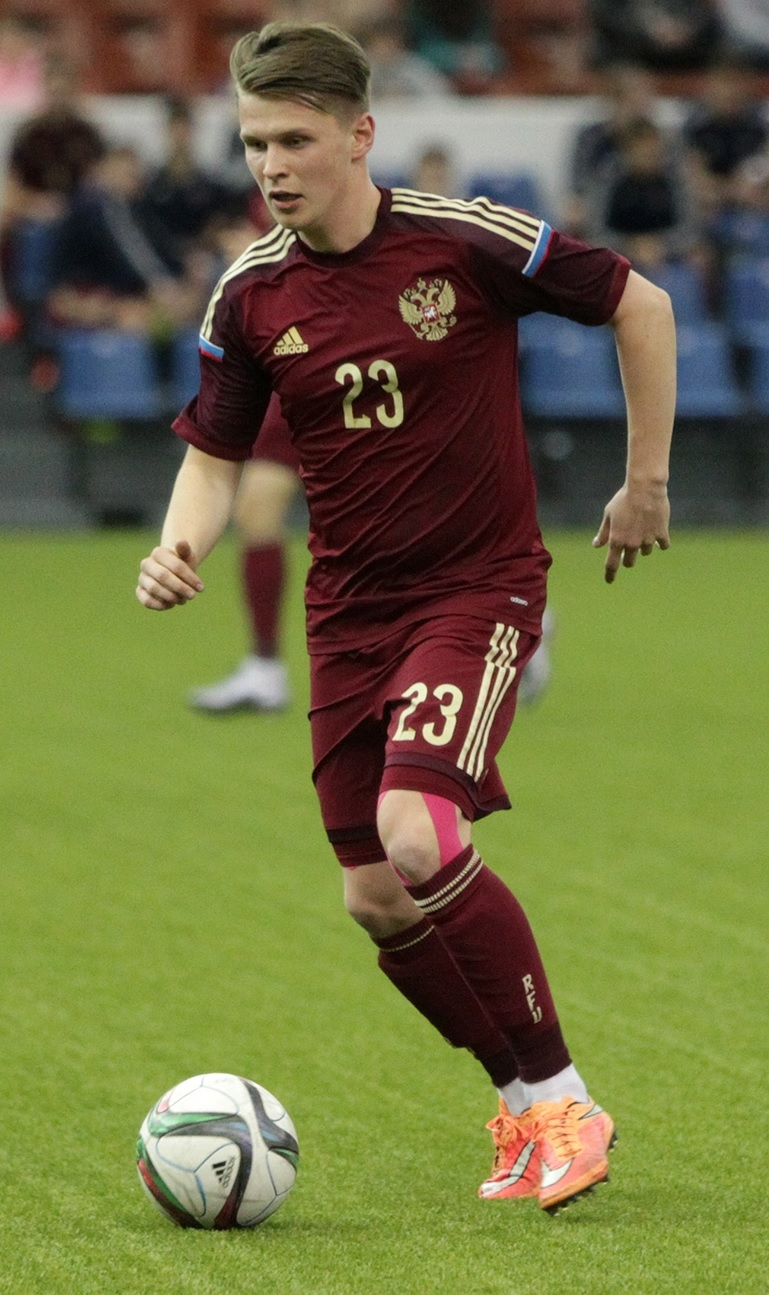
- Salamatov with Russia U-21 in 2016

Personal information
- Full name: Nikita Vasilyevich Salamatov
- Date of birth: 23 February 1994 (age 32)
- Place of birth: Moscow, Russia
- Height: 1.72 m (5 ft 7 1/2 in)
- Positions: Midfielder; forward

Youth career
- FC Torpedo Moscow
- 2011–2014: FC Lokomotiv Moscow

Senior career*
Years	Team	Apps	(Gls)
2014–2015	FC Khimki	28	(7)
2015	FC Vityaz Podolsk	14	(7)
2016	FC Zenit-2 Saint Petersburg	30	(3)
2017	FC SKA Rostov-on-Don	13	(0)
2017–2018	FC Tyumen	22	(2)
2018–2019	PFC Sochi	13	(3)
2019–2020	FC Luch Vladivostok	16	(2)
2020	FC Tambov	1	(0)
2020	FC Irtysh Omsk	4	(0)
2022–2023	FC Spartak Kostroma	12	(1)
2023	FC Krasnoye Znamya Noginsk	29	(12)

International career
2012	Russia U-19	2	(0)
2014–2016	Russia U-21	6	(1)
- * Club domestic league appearances and goals

Nikita Vasilyevich Salamatov (Russian: Никита Васильевич Саламатов; born 23 February 1994) is a Russian former football player.

== Club career ==
He made his professional debut in the Russian Professional Football League for FC Khimki on 12 July 2014 in a game against FC Spartak Kostroma.

He made his Russian Football National League debut for FC Zenit-2 Saint Petersburg on 12 March 2016 in a game against FC Volgar Astrakhan.

He made his Russian Premier League debut for FC Tambov on 4 July 2020 in a game against FC Spartak Moscow, replacing Vladimir Obukhov in the added time.
