= Aleksandr Yelovskikh =

Russian footballer

Personal information
- Full name: Aleksandr Dmitriyevich Yelovskikh
- Date of birth: 12 September 1998 (age 28)
- Place of birth: Saint Petersburg, Russia
- Height: 1.78 m (5 ft 10 in)
- Positions: Midfielder; forward

Senior career*
Years	Team	Apps	(Gls)
2017–2019	FC Zenit Saint Petersburg	0	(0)
2017–2019	→ FC Zenit-2 Saint Petersburg	34	(3)
2019–2020	FC Zvezda Saint Petersburg	10	(1)
2020–2021	FC Zenit Saint Petersburg	0	(0)
2020–2021	→ FC Zenit-2 Saint Petersburg	21	(4)
2021–2022	FC Krasava Odintsovo	28	(9)

International career^{‡}
2013	Russia U-15	6	(0)
2014	Russia U-16	2	(0)
- * Club domestic league appearances and goals as of 10 June 2022 ‡ National team caps and goals as of 39 April 2014

Aleksandr Dmitriyevich Yelovskikh (Russian: Александр Дмитриевич Еловских; born 12 September 1998) is a Russian football player.

== Club career ==
He made his debut in the Russian Football National League for FC Zenit-2 Saint Petersburg on 16 July 2017 in a game against FC Dynamo Saint Petersburg.
