= Mikhail Kizeyev (footballer) =

Russian footballer

Personal information
- Full name: Mikhail Alekseyevich Kizeyev
- Date of birth: 17 March 1997 (age 29)
- Place of birth: Vladivostok, Russia
- Height: 1.85 m (6 ft 1 in)
- Position: Goalkeeper

Senior career*
Years	Team	Apps	(Gls)
2015–2022	Zenit-2 St. Petersburg	17	(0)
2019	Zenit St. Petersburg	0	(0)
2019–2020	Akritas Chlorakas (loan)	15	(0)
2020–2022	Codru Lozova	11	(0)
2022	Zenit St. Petersburg	0	(0)
2022–2023	Sever Murmansk (amateur)		
- * Club domestic league appearances and goals

Mikhail Alekseyevich Kizeyev (Russian: Михаил Алексеевич Кизеев; born 17 March 1997) is a Russian former professional football player.

== Club career ==
He made his debut in the Russian Football National League for FC Zenit-2 Saint Petersburg on 24 September 2017 in a game against FC Olimpiyets Nizhny Novgorod.
