= Daniil Maykov =

Russian footballer

Personal information
- Full name: Daniil Vyacheslavovich Maykov
- Date of birth: 14 April 1997 (age 29)
- Place of birth: Saint Petersburg, Russia
- Height: 1.79 m (5 ft 10 1/2 in)
- Position: Defender

Youth career
- 2008–2012: Lokomotiv Saint Petersburg
- 2012–2016: Zenit Saint Petersburg

Senior career*
Years	Team	Apps	(Gls)
2016	Zenit-2 Saint Petersburg	1	(0)
2017	Slavia Sofia	3	(0)
- * Club domestic league appearances and goals

Daniil Vyacheslavovich Maykov (Russian: Даниил Вячеславович Майков; born 14 April 1997) is a Russian former football player.

== Career ==
=== Zenit ===
Maykov joined Zenit academy in 2012 from Lokomotiv Saint Petersburg. He made his debut in the Russian Football National League for FC Zenit-2 Saint Petersburg on 21 May 2016 in a game against FC Torpedo Armavir.

=== Slavia Sofia ===
Maykov joined Slavia Sofia on trial in January 2017. On 17 February 2017, he signed a contract. Maykov made his league debut on 5 March in a 3–0 home loss against Neftochimic Burgas. He was set to be released by the new manager in the beginning of June 2017, but returned in the team for second summer camp of the team. On 11 July 2017, his contract was terminated by mutual consent.

== Career statistics ==
=== Club ===
As of 11 May 2017

Club performance			League		Cup		Continental		Other		Total	
Club	League	Season	Apps	Goals	Apps	Goals	Apps	Goals	Apps	Goals	Apps	Goals
Russia			League		Russian Cup		Europe		Other (Note: Includes Russian Super Cup matches.)		Total	
Zenit-2 Saint Petersburg	National League	2015–16	1	0	–		–		–		1	0
Zenit-2 Saint Petersburg	National League	2016–17	0	0	–		–		–		0	0
Zenit-2 Saint Petersburg	Total		1	0	0	0	0	0	0	0	1	0
Bulgaria			League		Bulgarian Cup		Europe		Other (Note: Includes Bulgarian Supercup matches.)		Total	
Slavia Sofia	First League	2016–17	3	0	0	0	0	0	—		3	0
Slavia Sofia	Total		3	0	0	0	0	0	0	0	3	0
Career statistics			4	0	0	0	0	0	0	0	4	0
