= Pavel Dolgov =

Russian football player

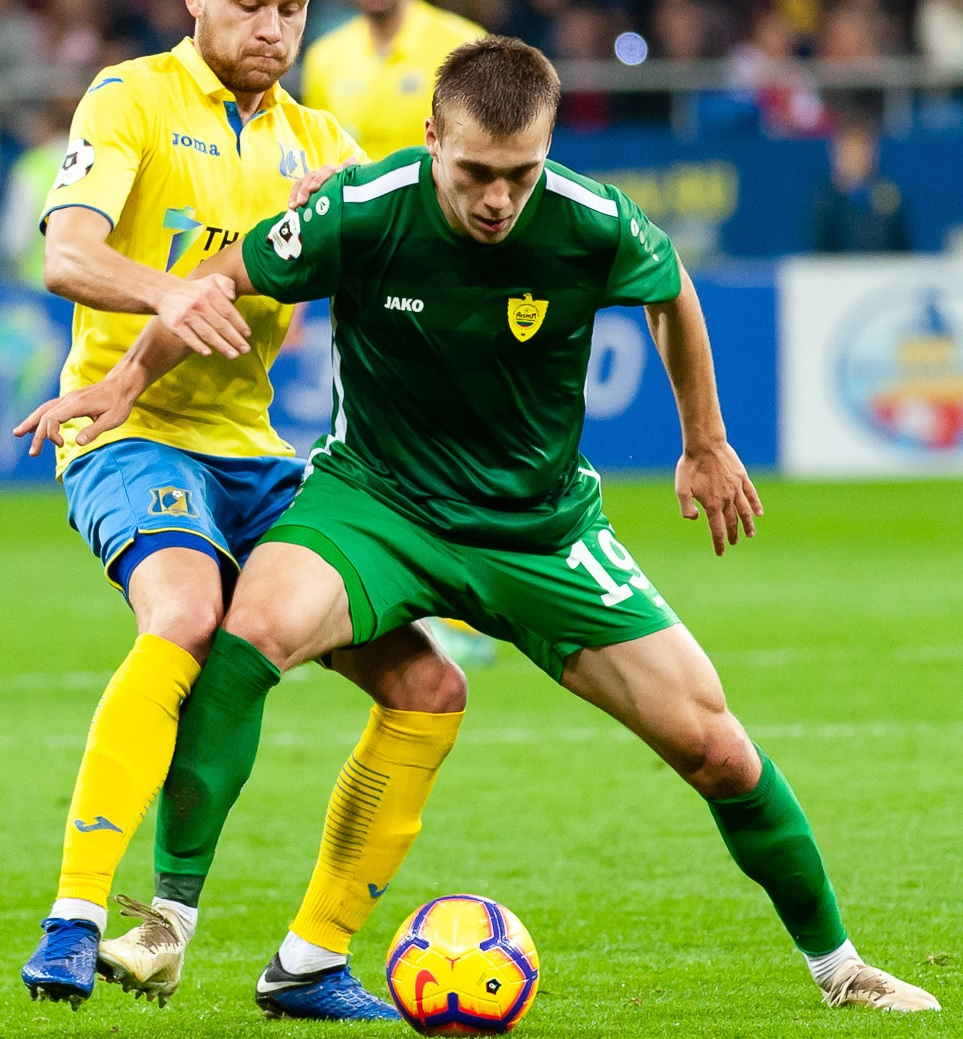
- Dolgov with Anzhi Makhachkala in 2018

Personal information
- Full name: Pavel Vladimirovich Dolgov
- Date of birth: 16 August 1996 (age 30)
- Place of birth: Mamonovo, Russia
- Height: 1.87 m (6 ft 2 in)
- Positions: Forward; midfielder

Youth career
- Baltika Kaliningrad
- 2011–2013: Zenit Saint Petersburg

Senior career*
Years	Team	Apps	(Gls)
2013–2016	Zenit Saint Petersburg	8	(0)
2013–2016	→ Zenit-2 Saint Petersburg	64	(14)
2017–2019	Anzhi Makhachkala	33	(2)
2017	→ Anzhi-2 Makhachkala	7	(2)
2018	→ Torpedo-BelAZ Zhodino (loan)	11	(2)
2019	Yenisey Krasnoyarsk	13	(1)
2020	Tom Tomsk	13	(1)
2021	Zenit-2 Saint Petersburg	10	(4)
2021	Amkar Perm	0	(0)
2021	Zenit-2 Saint Petersburg	14	(2)
2022	Metallurg Lipetsk	11	(0)
2022	Atyrau	7	(1)
2023–2024	Chayka Peschanokopskoye	41	(17)
2024–2025	Alania Vladikavkaz	5	(2)
- * Club domestic league appearances and goals as of 24 May 2025

Pavel Vladimirovich Dolgov (Russian: Павел Владимирович Долгов; born 16 August 1996) is a Russian football player who plays as an attacking midfielder.

== Club career ==
Pavel started playing football in Baltika Kaliningrad youth team. In 2011, he joined the Zenit Saint Petersburg football academy.

He made his professional debut in the Russian Professional Football League for Zenit-2 St. Petersburg on 18 August 2013 in a game against Volga Tver.

He made his Russian Premier League debut for Zenit St. Petersburg on 1 August 2015 in a game against Terek Grozny.

On 1 July 2022, Atyrau announced the signing of Dolgov.

== Career statistics ==
As of 8 June 2024

Club	Season	League			Cup		Continental		Other		Total	
Club	Season	Division	Apps	Goals	Apps	Goals	Apps	Goals	Apps	Goals	Apps	Goals
Zenit Saint Petersburg	2013–14	Russian Premier League	0	0	0	0	0	0	0	0	0	0
Zenit Saint Petersburg	2015–16	Russian Premier League	8	0	2	0	1 (Note: Appearance in the UEFA Champions League)	0	0	0	11	0
Zenit Saint Petersburg	Total		8	0	2	0	1	0	0	0	11	0
Zenit-2 Saint Petersburg	2013–14	Russian Second League	12	4	–		–		–		12	4
Zenit-2 Saint Petersburg	2014–15	Russian Second League	11	3	–		–		–		11	3
Zenit-2 Saint Petersburg	2015–16	Russian First League	18	3	–		–		–		18	3
Zenit-2 Saint Petersburg	2016–17	Russian First League	23	4	–		–		–		23	4
Zenit-2 Saint Petersburg	Total		64	14	0	0	0	0	0	0	64	14
Anzhi Makhachkala	2016–17	Russian Premier League	5	0	1	0	–		–		6	0
Anzhi Makhachkala	2017–18	Russian Premier League	5	0	0	0	–		–		5	0
Anzhi Makhachkala	2018–19	Russian Premier League	23	2	1	1	–		–		24	3
Anzhi Makhachkala	Total		33	2	2	1	0	0	0	0	35	3
Anzhi-2 Makhachkala	2017–18	Russian Second League	7	2	–		–		–		7	2
Torpedo-BelAZ Zhodino (loan)	2018	Belarusian Premier League	11	2	–		–		–		11	2
Yenisey Krasnoyarsk	2019–20	Russian First League	13	1	2	0	–		–		15	1
Tom Tomsk	2019–20	Russian First League	2	0	–		–		5 (Note: Appearances in the FNL Cup)	2	7	2
Tom Tomsk	2020–21	Russian First League	11	1	1	0	–		–		12	1
Tom Tomsk	Total		13	1	1	0	0	0	5	2	19	3
Zenit-2 Saint Petersburg	2020–21	Russian Second League	10	4	–		–		–		10	4
Amkar Perm	2021–22	Russian Second League	0	0	0	0	–		–		0	0
Zenit-2 Saint Petersburg	2021–22	Russian Second League	14	2	–		–		–		14	2
Metallurg Lipetsk	2021–22	Russian First League	11	0	–		–		–		11	0
Atyrau	2022	Kazakhstan Premier League	7	1	6	0	–		–		13	1
Chayka	2022–23	Russian Second League	12	1	–		–		–		12	1
Chayka	2023–24	Russian Second League A	29	16	1	1	–		–		30	17
Chayka	Total		41	17	1	1	0	0	0	0	42	18
Career total			232	46	14	2	1	0	5	2	252	50
