= Ruslan Kazakov =

Russian footballer

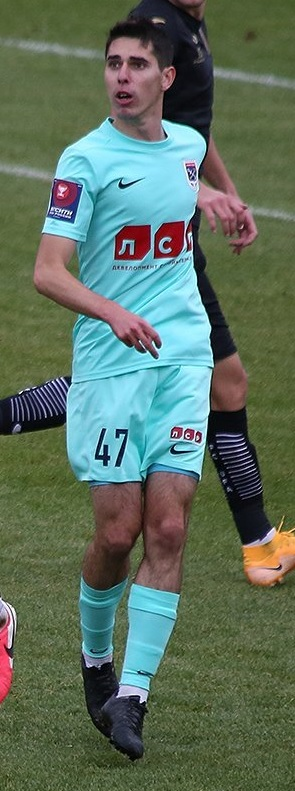
- Kazakov with FC Leningradets in 2020

Personal information
- Full name: Ruslan Eldarovich Kazakov
- Date of birth: 6 February 1999 (age 27)
- Place of birth: Saint Petersburg, Russia
- Height: 1.81 m (5 ft 11 in)
- Position: Midfielder

Team information
- Current team: FC Volna Nizhny Novgorod Oblast
- Number: 6

Youth career
- –2017: FC Zenit Saint Petersburg

Senior career*
| Years | Team | Apps | (Gls) |
| 2018 | FC Zenit-2 Saint Petersburg | 15 | (1) |
| 2019–2026 | FC Leningradets Leningrad Oblast | 160 | (13) |
| 2026– | FC Volna Nizhny Novgorod Oblast | 24 | (0) |

International career^{‡}
| 2017 | Russia U-20 | 1 | (0) |
- * Club domestic league appearances and goals as of 31 October 2026 ‡ National team caps and goals as of 2 August 2017

Ruslan Eldarovich Kazakov (Russian: Руслан Эльдарович Казаков; born 6 February 1999) is a Russian football player who plays as a midfielder for Russian Second League club FC Volna Nizhny Novgorod Oblast.

== Club career ==
He made his debut in the Russian Football National League for FC Zenit-2 Saint Petersburg on 17 July 2018 in a game against FC Tambov.

On 2 February 2019, he joined third-tier PFL club FC Leningradets Leningrad Oblast.
