= Sergei Zuykov =

Russian footballer

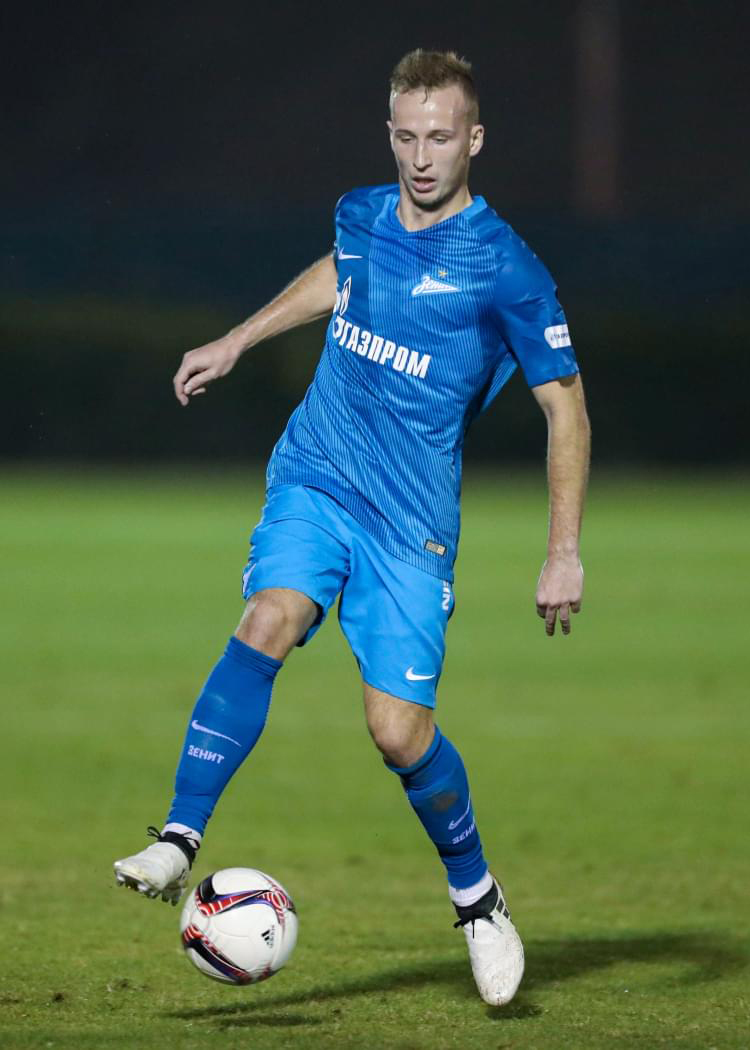
- Zuykov in 2017

Personal information
- Full name: Sergei Andreyevich Zuykov
- Date of birth: 19 September 1993 (age 33)
- Place of birth: Lyubertsy, Russia
- Height: 1.79 m (5 ft 10 in)
- Position: Defender

Youth career
- FC Lokomotiv Moscow

Senior career*
Years	Team	Apps	(Gls)
2013–2016	FC Volgar Astrakhan	76	(6)
2017–2019	FC Zenit Saint Petersburg	0	(0)
2017	→ FC Zenit-2 St. Petersburg	14	(0)
2017–2018	→ FC Tom Tomsk (loan)	45	(2)
2019	→ FC Tambov (loan)	1	(0)
2020–2021	FC Nizhny Novgorod	23	(1)
2021–2022	FC Tom Tomsk	23	(1)
2022–2024	FC Rotor Volgograd	53	(8)
2024–2025	FC Volgar Astrakhan	16	(1)
2025–2026	FC Tyumen	6	(0)

International career
2010–2011	Russia U-18	7	(1)
2011	Russia U-19	4	(0)
2014	Russia U-21	6	(0)
- * Club domestic league appearances and goals as of 14 June 2026

Sergei Andreyevich Zuykov (Russian: Серге́й Андреевич Зуйков; born 19 September 1993) is a Russian football defender.

== Club career ==
He made his debut in the Russian Football National League for FC Volgar Astrakhan on 12 March 2013 in a game against FC Ural Sverdlovsk Oblast.

On 25 January 2019, he joined FC Tambov on loan.
