= FC Zenit-2 Saint Petersburg =

FC Zenit-2 St. Petersburg
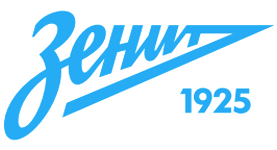
- Full name: Football Club Zenit-2 Saint Petersburg
- Nickname: Sine-Belo-Golubye (The Blue-White-Sky Blues)
- Founded: 2013
- Ground: MSA Petrovskiy, Saint Petersburg; Petrovsky, Saint Petersburg
- Capacity: 2,809; 21,405
- Owner: Gazprombank
- Chairman: Konstantin Zyryanov
- Manager: Aleksandr Selenkov
- League: Russian Second League, Division A, Gold Group
- 2026–27: First stage: Silver Group, 1st
- Website: 2.fc-zenit.ru
Home colours	Away colours

FC Zenit-2 Saint Petersburg (Russian: ФК «Зенит-2» Санкт-Петербург) is a Russian football team from Saint Petersburg. It plays in the Russian Second League (third level). It is a farm club for the Russian Premier League team FC Zenit Saint Petersburg.

== History ==
Zenit's reserve squad played professionally as Zenit-2 (Russian Second League in 1993, Russian Second Division from 1998 to 2000) and Zenit-d (Russian Third League from 1994 to 1997). Another team that was founded as Lokomotiv-Zenit-2 played as Zenit-2 in the Russian Second Division from 2001 to 2008. By 2008, there was no relation between that team and FC Zenit. Another farm club called FC Smena-Zenit debuted in the Russian Second Division in 2009, taking the spot of the former FC Zenit-2. FC Smena-Zenit was dissolved after the 2009 season because it did not fulfill Zenit's initial expectations. Zenit-2 reentered professional football in the 2013–14 season in the Russian Professional Football League.

In the 2014–15 season, Zenit-2 came in second in its PFL zone behind FC Spartak-2 Moscow. When FC Torpedo Armavir (which qualified for promotion from the Zone South) refused to be promoted to FNL for financial reasons, the league offered the second-placed teams in the PFL an FNL spot. Zenit-2 was the only one who applied and played in the second-tier competition for the first time in their history in 2015–16. Zenit-2 finished the 2017–18 season in the relegation zone, but was saved from going down due to several teams above them failing licensing. At the end of the 2018–19 season it was relegated back to the PFL.

== Current squad ==
As of 11 September 2026

Note: Flags indicate national team as defined under FIFA eligibility rules; some limited exceptions apply. Players may hold more than one non-FIFA nationality.

No.	Pos.	Nation	Player
21	MF	RUS	Aleksandr Yerokhin
35	DF	RUS	Danila Gayvoronsky
37	DF	RUS	Ivan Terentyev
38	MF	RUS	Amir Musayev
39	FW	RUS	Maksim Khokhlov
40	MF	RUS	Aleksandr Yudin
43	DF	RUS	Denis Terentyev
45	MF	RUS	Kirill Glazunov
47	DF	RUS	Kirill Obonin
49	FW	RUS	Linar Khanov
51	MF	RUS	Vadim Shilov
53	FW	RUS	Aleksandr Yegurnev (on loan from Krasnodar)
58	FW	RUS	Pavel Izotov (on loan from Oryol)
63	MF	RUS	Stanislav Karelin
64	FW	RUS	Konstantin Voinkov

No.	Pos.	Nation	Player
70	MF	RUS	Nikita Vershinin
71	DF	RUS	Dmitry Shumikhin
72	DF	RUS	Aleksey Busalayev
73	DF	RUS	Maksim Lavrikov
75	MF	RUS	Bogdan Levandovsky
80	DF	RUS	Ilya Bulygin
84	GK	RUS	Artyom Mityayev
85	MF	RUS	Sergey Chernov
86	FW	RUS	Dmitry Barkov
87	MF	RUS	Savely Nikiforov
91	FW	RUS	Kirill Kosarev
93	GK	RUS	Maksim Shichanin
94	GK	RUS	Grigory Ryzhkov
96	GK	RUS	Maksim Zaytsev
97	MF	RUS	Yevgeny Dubinin
