= List of Russian football transfers summer 2020 =

This is a list of Russian football transfers in the 2020 summer transfer window by club. Only clubs of the 2020–21 Russian Premier League are included.

== Russian Premier League 2020–21 ==
=== Akhmat Grozny ===
In: Note: Flags indicate national team as defined under FIFA eligibility rules; some limited exceptions apply. Players may hold more than one non-FIFA nationality.

No.	Pos.	Nation	Player
3	FW	RUS	Georgi Melkadze (on loan from Spartak Moscow)
6	MF	RUS	Amir Adouyev (from (France) Montpellier)
8	DF	SRB	Miroslav Bogosavac (from (Serbia) Čukarički, previously on loan)
14	MF	UKR	Artem Polyarus (from Khimki)
22	MF	RUS	Andemir Goguzokov
45	DF	RUS	Aslambek Bunkhoyev
55	DF	RUS	Aleksandr Putsko (from Ufa)
70	MF	RUS	Movsar Batsuyev
79	DF	RUS	Turpal-Ali Ibishev
88	GK	RUS	Giorgi Shelia (from Tambov)
94	MF	RUS	Artyom Timofeyev (on loan from Spartak Moscow)
96	DF	KAZ	Marat Bystrov (from (Kazakhstan) Ordabasy)
97	GK	RUS	Magomed-Deni Tsutsulayev

Out: Note: Flags indicate national team as defined under FIFA eligibility rules; some limited exceptions apply. Players may hold more than one non-FIFA nationality.

No.	Pos.	Nation	Player
5	DF	RUS	Magomed Musalov (to (Armenia) Pyunik)
7	FW	RUS	Magomed Mitrishev (on loan to Chayka Peschanokopskoye)
9	FW	VEN	Andrés Ponce (on loan to Rotor Volgograd)
13	MF	RUS	Roland Gigolayev
14	MF	BRA	Ravanelli (on loan to (Brazil) Athletico Paranaense)
16	GK	RUS	Yevgeni Gorodov (to Krasnodar)
17	FW	SEN	Ablaye Mbengue (not registered with the league)
18	FW	RUS	Idris Umayev (on loan to Chayka Peschanokopskoye, previously on loan to Khimki)
27	FW	BRA	Felipe Vizeu (end of loan from (Italy) Udinese)
44	DF	RUS	Khalid Vokuyev
45	DF	RUS	Imran Alsultanov
53	MF	RUS	Minkail Matsuyev (to Krasnodar)
66	DF	RUS	Mursalin Denilkhanov
69	MF	RUS	Ilya Moseychuk (on loan to Tekstilshchik Ivanovo)
71	DF	RUS	Akhmad Edilbiyev
84	MF	RUS	Magomed-Emi Khakiyev
88	MF	RUS	Denis Glushakov (to Khimki)
89	MF	RUS	Khamzat Khazhmukhambetov
97	GK	RUS	Ramzan Mutuskhanov
99	FW	RUS	Taymaz Khizriyev
—	DF	RUS	Pavel Kaloshin (not registered with the league, previously on loan to Torpedo Moscow)
—	MF	RUS	Mikhail Gashchenkov (to Nizhny Novgorod, previously on loan to SKA-Khabarovsk)
—	MF	RUS	Vladimir Khubulov (to Alania Vladikavkaz, previously on loan to Zenit St. Petersburg)
—	MF	POL	Konrad Michalak (on loan to (Turkey) Çaykur Rizespor, previously on loan to (Turkey) Ankaragücü)
—	MF	POL	Damian Szymański (to (Greece) AEK Athens, previously on loan)

=== Arsenal Tula ===
In: Note: Flags indicate national team as defined under FIFA eligibility rules; some limited exceptions apply. Players may hold more than one non-FIFA nationality.

No.	Pos.	Nation	Player
5	DF	RUS	Taras Burlak (from Krylia Sovetov Samara)
7	MF	RUS	Aleksandr Lomovitsky (on loan from Spartak Moscow)
13	FW	RUS	Kirill Panchenko (from Tambov)
19	FW	MNE	Luka Đorđević (on loan from Lokomotiv Moscow)
21	MF	GHA	Mohammed Kadiri (on loan from (Ukraine) Dynamo Kyiv)
32	DF	RUS	Tamerlan Kuchiyev (from West Armenia)
41	MF	RUS	Yegor Makarov (from Rodina Moscow)
43	MF	RUS	Yegor Kudinov (from Lada-Tolyatti)
45	DF	RUS	Ilya Yermolayev
46	FW	RUS	Maksim Rozhin (from Kolomna)
54	DF	RUS	Vyacheslav Vyunkov (from Master-Saturn Yegoryevsk)
59	FW	RUS	Pyotr Ivanov (from Sakhalin Yuzhno-Sakhalinsk)
63	MF	RUS	Danila Polyakov
65	FW	RUS	Danil Polyakh (from Lokomotiv Moscow academy)
66	DF	RUS	Kirill Lomakin (from Krylia Sovetov Samara)
68	FW	RUS	Dmitri Bykov
69	GK	RUS	Pavel Boriskin (from Strogino Moscow academy)
72	GK	RUS	Yegor Sidorov
75	FW	RUS	Ilya Maysiyev
80	DF	RUS	Aleksandr Starovoytov
88	MF	RUS	Giorgi Uridia (from Rubin Kazan academy)
89	MF	RUS	Vladimir Banykin
90	DF	RUS	Aleksandr Dovbnya (end of loan to Rotor Volgograd)
92	DF	RUS	Nikolai Rasskazov (on loan from Spartak Moscow)
97	FW	RUS	David Rudakov
99	FW	RUS	Artyom Leybin

Out: Note: Flags indicate national team as defined under FIFA eligibility rules; some limited exceptions apply. Players may hold more than one non-FIFA nationality.

No.	Pos.	Nation	Player
7	MF	RUS	Kantemir Berkhamov
13	DF	BLR	Maksim Valadzko (to Tambov)
19	GK	RUS	Yuri Lodygin
19	MF	ZAM	Lameck Banda (on loan to (Israel) Maccabi Netanya)
21	DF	ESP	Víctor Álvarez
7	MF	RUS	Daniil Lesovoy (to Dynamo Moscow, previously from Zenit St. Petersburg, previously on loan)
26	DF	BFA	Bakary Koné
27	MF	RUS	Aleksandr Lomovitsky (end of loan from Spartak Moscow)
32	DF	RUS	Dmitri Kuzkin (to Zvezda St. Petersburg)
33	MF	RUS	Daniil Yerofeyev (to Tver)
35	DF	RUS	Aleksandr Krikunenko (to Irtysh Omsk)
37	DF	RUS	Aleksei Rodinkov (to Tver)
38	MF	RUS	Ilya Kuleshin (to Khimik-Arsenal)
42	MF	RUS	Aleksandr Grebenshchikov (to Khimik-Arsenal)
44	DF	RUS	Aleksei Ivanov (to Tver)
47	FW	RUS	Sergei Ilyin (to Zvezda St. Petersburg)
49	MF	RUS	Valeri Kharitonov (to Khimik-Arsenal)
51	FW	RUS	Konstantin Antipov (to Khimik-Arsenal)
56	DF	RUS	Dmitri Ilyukhin (to Khimik-Arsenal)
59	DF	RUS	Aleksandr Smelov (to Kafa Feodosia)
61	DF	RUS	Anton Ivanov (to (Belarus) Lokomotiv Gomel)
62	MF	RUS	Yevgeni Yevtushenko
63	MF	RUS	Valentin Klimovskiy
65	DF	RUS	Aleksandr Shpilevsky
67	MF	RUS	Ivan Kozlov (to Tver)
68	MF	RUS	Maksim Petrov (to (Belarus) Lokomotiv Gomel)
69	FW	RUS	Dmitri Malikov
72	DF	RUS	Nikita Melnikov (to Tver)
80	MF	RUS	Yaroslav Ivakin (to Tver)
81	MF	RUS	Ivan Belikov (to Kyzyltash Bakhchisaray)
84	GK	RUS	Dmitri Gerasimov (to Tver)
87	DF	RUS	Artyom Sukhanov
87	MF	RUS	Ivan Alekseyev (to Zvezda St. Petersburg)
89	MF	RUS	Timur Lobanov
95	GK	RUS	Andrei Sorokin (to (Serbia) Spartak Subotica)
96	GK	RUS	Aleksandr Mironov (to Khimik-Arsenal)
99	MF	RUS	Danila Shebunov
—	FW	ROU	Alexandru Tudorie (on loan to (Romania) CS Universitatea Craiova, previously on loan to (Romania) Voluntari)

=== CSKA Moscow ===
In: Note: Flags indicate national team as defined under FIFA eligibility rules; some limited exceptions apply. Players may hold more than one non-FIFA nationality.

No.	Pos.	Nation	Player
3	DF	BRA	Bruno Fuchs (from (Brazil) Internacional)
11	FW	NGA	Chidera Ejuke (from (Netherlands) Heerenveen)
19	MF	KAZ	Baktiyar Zaynutdinov (from Rostov)
21	FW	ARG	Adolfo Gaich (from (Argentina) San Lorenzo)
51	MF	RUS	Dmitry Begun (from Luch Vladivostok)
53	MF	RUS	Zaur Tarba
54	DF	RUS	Yegor Truntayev
71	MF	RUS	Nair Tiknizyan (end of loan to Avangard Kursk)
72	MF	RUS	Nikita Yermakov (from own academy)
80	MF	RUS	Malik Munayev
83	DF	RUS	Denis Pershin
86	GK	RUS	Vladimir Shaykhutdinov
90	DF	RUS	Matvey Lukin
95	GK	RUS	Vadim Tsvetkov

Out: Note: Flags indicate national team as defined under FIFA eligibility rules; some limited exceptions apply. Players may hold more than one non-FIFA nationality.

No.	Pos.	Nation	Player
1	GK	RUS	Ilya Pomazun (on loan to Ural Yekaterinburg)
18	FW	MLI	Lassana N'Diaye (on loan to (Sweden) AFC Eskilstuna)
27	DF	CIV	Cédric Gogoua (on loan to Rotor Volgograd)
29	MF	SVN	Jaka Bijol (on loan to (Germany) Hannover 96)
33	GK	RUS	Nikolai Radchenko
53	DF	RUS	Maksim Yeleyev (on loan to Akron Tolyatti)
56	FW	RUS	Yegor Shapovalov (to Zenit St. Petersburg)
77	GK	RUS	Nikolay Zirikov (to Metallurg Vidnoye)
90	DF	RUS	Yegor Teslenko (to KAMAZ Naberezhnye Chelny)
92	DF	RUS	Aleksei Sukharev (end of loan from Avangard Kursk)
93	DF	RUS	Sergei Kochetkov
—	MF	RUS	Gocha Gogrichiani (on loan to Akron Tolyatti, previously from Rostov)
—	MF	RUS	Khetag Khosonov (to Alania Vladikavkaz, previously on loan to Tambov)
—	FW	RUS	Timur Zhamaletdinov (to Ufa, previously on loan to (Poland) Lech Poznań)

=== Dynamo Moscow ===
In: Note: Flags indicate national team as defined under FIFA eligibility rules; some limited exceptions apply. Players may hold more than one non-FIFA nationality.

No.	Pos.	Nation	Player
2	DF	URU	Guillermo Varela (on loan from (Denmark) Copenhagen)
8	MF	CRO	Nikola Moro (from (Croatia) Dinamo Zagreb)
10	FW	NGA	Sylvester Igboun (from Ufa, previously on loan)
16	GK	RUS	Ivan Budachev (from Leningradets Leningrad Oblast)
17	FW	RUS	Anton Terekhov (end of loan to Krylia Sovetov Samara)
19	MF	RUS	Daniil Lesovoy (from Arsenal Tula)
20	MF	RUS	Vyacheslav Grulyov (end of loan to Nizhny Novgorod)
21	FW	RUS	Ivan Zazvonkin
28	FW	RUS	Yevgeni Mukhin
32	FW	RUS	Ulvi Babayev (from own academy)
37	FW	RUS	Dmitri Malygin (from own academy)
41	DF	RUS	Matvey Smirnov (from Lokomotiv Moscow academy)
43	DF	RUS	Denis Osokin (from own academy)
46	MF	RUS	Artyom Fisenko
48	FW	RUS	Timur Fisenko
49	MF	RUS	Yevgeni Figurov (from own academy)
52	MF	RUS	Daniil Mikhaylin (from own academy)
56	MF	RUS	Matvey Ivakhnov (from own academy)
58	MF	RUS	Maksim Kipkayev (from own academy)
60	GK	RUS	Maksim Demanov (from own academy)
61	MF	RUS	Artyom Kuznetsov (from own academy)
63	GK	RUS	Mikhail Yashin
64	DF	RUS	Sergei Pushkov (from own academy)
72	MF	RUS	Daniil Fomin (from own academy)
73	DF	RUS	Ruslan Shagiakhmetov (from own academy)
74	MF	RUS	Daniil Fomin (from Ufa)
78	MF	RUS	Matvey Chekalin
80	MF	RUS	Eduard Dzhedzheya
81	MF	RUS	Maksim Aleksandrov (from Lokomotiv Moscow academy)
83	FW	RUS	Arsen Dzhioyev (from own academy)
84	DF	RUS	Artyom Yapryntsev (from own academy)
85	DF	RUS	Samuel Adeniyi (from own academy)
89	MF	RUS	Kirill Zhukovskiy (from own academy)
91	FW	RUS	Yaroslav Gladyshev (from own academy)
92	DF	RUS	Yan Tses (from own academy)
97	MF	RUS	Ruslan Maltsev (from own academy)
98	FW	RUS	Roman Dunayev

Out: Note: Flags indicate national team as defined under FIFA eligibility rules; some limited exceptions apply. Players may hold more than one non-FIFA nationality.

No.	Pos.	Nation	Player
2	DF	RUS	Grigori Morozov (on loan to Ufa)
4	DF	RUS	Vladimir Rykov (to Ural Yekaterinburg)
5	FW	GER	Maximilian Philipp (on loan to (Germany) VfL Wolfsburg)
6	MF	RUS	Artur Yusupov (to Sochi)
8	FW	RUS	Kirill Panchenko (to Tambov)
22	MF	RUS	Joãozinho (to Sochi)
23	MF	RUS	Anton Sosnin
33	GK	RUS	Yegor Sedov
44	DF	BIH	Toni Šunjić (to (China) Beijing Sinobo Guoan)
54	DF	RUS	Ilya Kalachyov (on loan to Tom Tomsk)
88	MF	SWE	Oscar Hiljemark (end of loan from (Italy) Genoa)
91	MF	RUS	Georgy Sulakvelidze
—	DF	RUS	Danil Lipovoy (on loan to Khimki, previously on loan to Orenburg)
—	MF	POR	Miguel Cardoso (on loan to (Portugal) Belenenses SAD, previously on loan to Tambov)
—	FW	LTU	Fedor Černych (to (Poland) Jagiellonia Białystok, previously on loan to Orenburg)
—	FW	RUS	Yevgeni Markov (to Krasnodar, previously on loan to Rubin Kazan)
—	FW	RUS	Timur Melekestsev (to (Czech Republic) Slovácko, previously on loan to Urozhay Krasnodar)
—	FW	RUS	Nikolay Obolsky (to (Spain) Barakaldo, previously on loan to Nizhny Novgorod)

=== Khimki ===
In: Note: Flags indicate national team as defined under FIFA eligibility rules; some limited exceptions apply. Players may hold more than one non-FIFA nationality.

No.	Pos.	Nation	Player
2	DF	RUS	Arseny Logashov (on loan from Rostov)
4	DF	NGA	Brian Idowu (on loan from Lokomotiv Moscow)
8	MF	RUS	Denis Glushakov (from Akhmat Grozny)
11	MF	RUS	Reziuan Mirzov (on loan from Spartak Moscow)
18	DF	RUS	Danil Lipovoy (on loan from Dynamo Moscow)
20	MF	KAZ	Islambek Kuat (from Orenburg)
21	MF	RUS	Ilya Kamyshev (on loan from Chertanovo Moscow)
25	DF	RUS	Oleksandr Filin (end of loan to Tambov)
28	MF	RUS	Pavel Mogilevets (from Rubin Kazan)
36	GK	RUS	Mikhail Dorokhin
38	MF	RUS	Danil Shulyak
47	FW	RUS	Aleksandr Dolgov (on loan from Rostov)
51	DF	RUS	Sergei Mizgiryov (free agent, last with Dynamo Barnaul)
55	DF	RUS	Vadim Khromin (from Spartak Moscow academy)
59	FW	RUS	Yegor Shmarov (from Khimki-M)
62	DF	RUS	Vyacheslav Frolov (from Spartak Moscow)
65	MF	RUS	Kirill Rulyov (from CSKA Moscow academy)
67	MF	RUS	Ivan Sergeyev
68	FW	RUS	Timofey Tokarev
70	MF	RUS	Andrei Murnin
71	DF	RUS	Vladimir Shishnin (from Khimki-M)
73	DF	RUS	Yegor Murasin
74	DF	RUS	Maksim Lukyanov
79	MF	RUS	Vladislav Borzenkov (from CSKA Moscow academy)
81	MF	RUS	Danil Slobodyan (from Khimki-M)
85	DF	RUS	Timofey Klimov
86	MF	RUS	Valeri Chupin (from Lada Dimitrovgrad)
89	FW	RUS	Nikita Kiselyov
90	MF	RUS	Georgi Polosin
92	MF	RUS	Vladislav Karavaytsev
93	GK	RUS	Ilya Tuseyev (from UOR #5 Yegoryevsk)
94	MF	RUS	Roman Polkovnikov (from UOR #5 Yegoryevsk)
95	FW	RUS	Bogdan Chinaryov (from UOR #5 Yegoryevsk)
96	DF	RUS	Georgi Kadzhaya
97	FW	RUS	Sergei Mosiyan (from Khimki-M)
99	DF	RUS	Aleksandr Shmarov

Out: Note: Flags indicate national team as defined under FIFA eligibility rules; some limited exceptions apply. Players may hold more than one non-FIFA nationality.

No.	Pos.	Nation	Player
3	MF	RUS	Svyatoslav Georgiyevsky
8	MF	RUS	Bogdan Mishukov
9	MF	RUS	Maksim Martusevich
11	FW	RUS	Dmitry Barkov (to SKA-Khabarovsk)
11	MF	RUS	Aleksandr Lomovitsky (end of loan from Spartak Moscow)
13	FW	BLR	Mikalay Signevich (to (Belarus) BATE Borisov, previously from (Hungary) Ferencváros)
14	MF	UKR	Artem Polyarus (to Akhmat Grozny)
17	DF	RUS	Yegor Proshkin (to Torpedo Moscow)
20	MF	RUS	Nikita Malyarov (to Shinnik Yaroslavl)
21	FW	RUS	Artyom Popov
41	DF	RUS	Sergei Bednozhey
45	GK	RUS	Danila Bokov
46	FW	RUS	Aleksandr Olenyov
77	FW	RUS	Danil Massurenko
80	FW	RUS	Maksim Zhumabekov (to Khimki-M)
84	FW	RUS	Ilya Vorobyov (end of loan from Zenit St. Petersburg)
90	GK	RUS	Vladislav Lizenko
92	FW	RUS	Aleksei Skvortsov (to Orenburg)
95	FW	RUS	Idris Umayev (end of loan from Akhmat Grozny)
96	MF	RUS	Aleksandr Smirnov (to Rostov)
97	FW	RUS	Dmitri Kamenshchikov (to Tom Tomsk)
99	DF	RUS	Andrei Yevdokimov (to Torpedo Moscow)
—	MF	RUS	Andrei Mendel (to Volgar Astrakhan, previously on loan)

=== Krasnodar ===
In: Note: Flags indicate national team as defined under FIFA eligibility rules; some limited exceptions apply. Players may hold more than one non-FIFA nationality.

No.	Pos.	Nation	Player
1	GK	RUS	Yevgeni Gorodov (from Akhmat Grozny)
11	MF	RUS	Aleksei Ionov (from Rostov)
18	DF	RUS	Yevgeni Chernov (from Rostov)
20	FW	RUS	Yevgeni Markov (from Dynamo Moscow)
28	DF	RUS	Igor Smolnikov (from Zenit St. Petersburg)
76	MF	RUS	Minkail Matsuyev (from Akhmat Grozny)
91	MF	RUS	Arutyun Grigoryan (end of loan to (Czech Republic) Mladá Boleslav)
96	MF	RUS	Ruslan Rzayev (end of loan to Armavir)
—	MF	RUS	Andrei Tekuchyov (end of loan to Tom Tomsk, previously on loan to Chayka Peschanokopskoye)

Out: Note: Flags indicate national team as defined under FIFA eligibility rules; some limited exceptions apply. Players may hold more than one non-FIFA nationality.

No.	Pos.	Nation	Player
1	GK	RUS	Stanislav Kritsyuk (to (Portugal) Belenenses SAD)
3	DF	ISL	Jón Guðni Fjóluson (to (Norway) Brann)
5	DF	SRB	Uroš Spajić (on loan to (Netherlands) Feyenoord)
15	DF	RUS	Nikolay Markov (to Yenisey Krasnoyarsk)
20	MF	RUS	Ilya Zhigulyov (on loan to Rotor Volgograd)
24	MF	RUS	Dmitri Kratkov
25	DF	RUS	Ilya Khatuntsev
27	DF	RUS	Nikita Furin
28	DF	RUS	Maksim Khramtsov
36	FW	RUS	Mikhail Bersnev
44	DF	RUS	Sergei Borodin (on loan to Ufa)
44	DF	RUS	Igor Paradin (on loan to Chayka Peschanokopskoye, previously on loan to (Czech Republic) Teplice)
45	FW	RUS	Oleg Oznobikhin
49	MF	RUS	Alan Gioyev
57	DF	RUS	Rashid Chichba (to Krasnodar-3)
59	MF	RUS	Mikhail Kolomiytsev (to Krasnodar-3)
60	FW	RUS	German Onugkha (on loan to Tambov)
70	FW	RUS	Vladislav Samko
72	FW	RUS	Rustam Khalnazarov
76	MF	RUS	Artur Samartsiyev (to Krasnodar-3)
78	DF	RUS	Denis Vlasov (to Krasnodar-3)
79	DF	RUS	Mamma Mammayev (to Krasnodar-3)
85	FW	RUS	Stepan Komar
85	FW	RUS	Mikhail Strelnik (to Krasnodar-3)
86	DF	RUS	Daniil Kornyushin (on loan to Volgar Astrakhan)
91	MF	RUS	Roman Zashchepkin
94	FW	RUS	Omar Popov
96	DF	RUS	Danila Gayvoronsky
99	MF	POR	Manuel Fernandes (to (Turkey) Kayserispor)
—	DF	RUS	Leo Goglichidze (to Chayka Peschanokopskoye, previously on loan)
—	DF	RUS	Aleksei Gritsayenko (to Tambov, previously on loan)
—	MF	RUS	Artyom Golubev (to Ufa, previously on loan)
—	MF	RUS	Roman Kurazhov (to Dynamo Stavropol, previously on loan to KAMAZ Naberezhnye Chelny)
—	FW	RUS	Aleksandr Butenko (to Volgar Astrakhan, previously on loan)

=== Lokomotiv Moscow ===
In: Note: Flags indicate national team as defined under FIFA eligibility rules; some limited exceptions apply. Players may hold more than one non-FIFA nationality.

No.	Pos.	Nation	Player
4	DF	RUS	Vitali Lystsov (from Krylia Sovetov Samara)
9	FW	RUS	Fyodor Smolov (end of loan to (Spain) Celta Vigo)
25	FW	GUI	François Kamano (from (France) Bordeaux)
29	FW	CPV	Zé Luís (from (Portugal) Porto)
34	MF	RUS	Sergei Grishkin
40	MF	RUS	Vladimir Abramov (from Rostov)
41	DF	SRB	Slobodan Rajković (from (Italy) Perugia)
43	DF	RUS	Kirill Ivashkin (from own academy)
53	GK	RUS	Daniil Khudyakov (from own academy)
54	GK	RUS	Nikita Matyunin (from own academy)
55	DF	RUS	Mikhail Barinov
56	GK	RUS	Denis Uralev (from own academy)
60	GK	RUS	Andrey Savin (from Nosta Novotroitsk, previously on loan)
72	MF	RUS	Aleksei Larin (from own academy)
80	MF	RUS	Timur Kasimov (from Konoplyov football academy)
88	FW	BLR	Vitaly Lisakovich (from (Belarus) Shakhtyor Soligorsk)
89	GK	RUS	Amin Ramazanov (from own academy)
91	DF	RUS	Aleksei Kazarinov (from own academy)
93	MF	RUS	Artyom Karpukas (from own academy)
95	MF	RUS	Ilya Belikov
96	DF	RUS	Sergey Varatynov (from own academy)

Out: Note: Flags indicate national team as defined under FIFA eligibility rules; some limited exceptions apply. Players may hold more than one non-FIFA nationality.

No.	Pos.	Nation	Player
3	DF	NGA	Brian Idowu (on loan to Khimki)
5	DF	GER	Benedikt Höwedes (retired)
5	DF	GEO	Solomon Kvirkvelia (on loan to Rotor Volgograd)
8	FW	PER	Jefferson Farfán
18	MF	RUS	Aleksandr Kolomeytsev (retired)
18	FW	MNE	Luka Đorđević (on loan to Arsenal Tula)
23	MF	POR	João Mário (end of loan from (Italy) Inter Milan)
23	MF	UZB	Jasurbek Jaloliddinov (on loan to Tambov, previously from (Uzbekistan) Bunyodkor)
30	GK	RUS	Nikita Medvedev (to Rubin Kazan)
36	DF	RUS	Innokenti Samokhvalov (died)
43	DF	RUS	Artyom Gyurdzhan
44	DF	RUS	Dmitri Koltyapin
49	GK	RUS	Daniil Kuznetsov (to Rotor Volgograd)
53	DF	RUS	Ilya Panin (to Metallurg Vidnoye)
54	MF	RUS	Viktor Demyanov (to Baltika Kaliningrad)
59	MF	RUS	Aleksei Miranchuk (to (Italy) Atalanta)
67	MF	RUS	Roman Tugarev (on loan to Rostov)
83	MF	RUS	Aleksei Mironov (on loan to Orenburg)
89	MF	RUS	Nikita Dorofeyev (to Shinnik Yaroslavl)
91	MF	RUS	Dzambolat Tsallagov
93	FW	RUS	Timur Suleymanov (on loan to Nizhny Novgorod)
—	DF	RUS	Timofei Margasov (to Sochi, previously on loan)
—	DF	RUS	German Osnov (on loan to (Belarus) Energetik-BGU Minsk, previously on loan to Akron Tolyatti)
—	FW	RUS	Artyom Galadzhan (to Nizhny Novgorod, previously on loan to Rotor Volgograd)

=== Rostov ===
In: Note: Flags indicate national team as defined under FIFA eligibility rules; some limited exceptions apply. Players may hold more than one non-FIFA nationality.

No.	Pos.	Nation	Player
2	DF	NOR	Haitam Aleesami (from (France) Amiens)
4	DF	RUS	Denis Terentyev (from Zenit St. Petersburg)
6	MF	JPN	Kento Hashimoto (from (Japan) Tokyo)
8	MF	SWE	Armin Gigović (from (Sweden) Helsingborg)
9	FW	MKD	David Toshevski (from (North Macedonia) Rabotnički)
11	MF	SWE	Pontus Almqvist (from (Sweden) IFK Norrköping)
13	FW	RUS	Vladimir Obukhov (from Tambov)
22	DF	BLR	Aleksandr Pavlovets (from (Belarus) Dinamo Brest)
23	MF	RUS	Roman Tugarev (on loan from Lokomotiv Moscow)
41	DF	RUS	David Berezov (from Spartak Vladikavkaz)
67	MF	RUS	Aleksei Dyomushkin (from SShOR Zenit)
71	DF	RUS	Nikolai Poyarkov (end of loan to Rubin Kazan)
72	FW	RUS	Daniil Nikolayev (from SShOR Zenit)
76	MF	RUS	Danila Sukhomlinov (from Master-Saturn Yegoryevsk academy)
83	FW	RUS	Artur Sokhiyev (from Spartak Vladikavkaz)
85	MF	RUS	Daniil Sedov (from Master-Saturn Yegoryevsk U-17 academy)
93	GK	RUS	Danil Ryazanov (own youth)
97	MF	RUS	Artyom Isik (from Zenit St. Petersburg academy)
99	FW	RUS	Dmitry Poloz (from Sochi)
—	DF	RUS	Viktor Kozyrev (from Zenit St. Petersburg U-19)

Out: Note: Flags indicate national team as defined under FIFA eligibility rules; some limited exceptions apply. Players may hold more than one non-FIFA nationality.

No.	Pos.	Nation	Player
4	DF	RUS	Danila Vedernikov (on loan to Volgar Astrakhan)
8	MF	BUL	Ivelin Popov (to Sochi)
11	MF	RUS	Aleksei Ionov (to Krasnodar)
12	DF	RUS	Aleksandr Smirnov (on loan to Orenburg, previously from Khimki)
13	FW	RUS	Danila Proshlyakov (on loan to Torpedo Moscow)
14	FW	UZB	Eldor Shomurodov (to (Italy) Genoa)
18	MF	KAZ	Baktiyar Zaynutdinov (to CSKA Moscow)
24	MF	RUS	Konstantin Kovalyov (on loan to Baltika Kaliningrad, previously from Avangard Kursk)
25	DF	RUS	Arseny Logashov (on loan to Khimki)
26	FW	RUS	Aleksandr Saplinov (on loan to Rotor Volgograd)
28	DF	RUS	Yevgeni Chernov (to Krasnodar)
41	MF	RUS	Vyacheslav Larchenkov (to Metallurg Vidnoye)
47	FW	RUS	Aleksandr Dolgov (on loan from Khimki)
51	MF	RUS	Yevgeni Cherkes (on loan to Forte Taganrog)
62	MF	RUS	Ivan Komarov
63	DF	RUS	Aleksandr Zakharov (to Avangard Kursk)
68	MF	RUS	Vladislav Morozov (to Novosibirsk)
72	FW	RUS	Vladimir Abramov (to Lokomotiv Moscow)
73	DF	RUS	Yevgeni Livadnov (to Krylia Sovetov-2 Samara)
76	MF	RUS	Aleksandr Gulevsky
78	DF	RUS	Dmitri Chistyakov (on loan to Zenit St. Petersburg)
81	DF	RUS	Mikhail Osinov (on loan to Nizhny Novgorod)
83	FW	RUS	Bogdan Chinaryov (to Master-Saturn Yegoryevsk academy)
86	GK	RUS	Stepan Bardizh
89	FW	RUS	Vadim Zhikhartsev (to Luki-Energiya Velikiye Luki)
90	FW	RUS	Aleksandr Voronin
93	FW	RUS	Kristian Verbitsky
95	DF	RUS	Kirill Romanov
97	MF	RUS	Gocha Gogrichiani (to CSKA Moscow)
—	DF	RUS	Viktor Kozyrev (to Smolensk)
—	DF	RUS	Konstantin Pliyev (on loan to Ufa, previously on loan to Rubin Kazan)
—	MF	IRN	Saeid Ezatolahi (to (Denmark) Vejle, previously on loan to (Belgium) KAS Eupen)
—	MF	SWE	Anton Salétros (to (Norway) Sarpsborg, previously on loan)
—	MF	RUS	Aleksandr Zuyev (to Rubin Kazan, previously on loan)
—	FW	ISL	Viðar Örn Kjartansson (to (Norway) Vålerenga, previously on loan to (Turkey) Yeni Malatyaspor)
—	FW	ISL	Björn Bergmann Sigurðarson (to (Norway) Lillestrøm, previously on loan to (Cyprus) APOEL)

=== Rotor Volgograd ===
In: Note: Flags indicate national team as defined under FIFA eligibility rules; some limited exceptions apply. Players may hold more than one non-FIFA nationality.

No.	Pos.	Nation	Player
1	GK	RUS	Aleksandr Dovbnya (from Orenburg)
3	DF	ARM	Armen Manucharyan (from (Armenia) Pyunik)
4	DF	RUS	Oleg Kozhemyakin (from Shinnik Yaroslavl)
6	DF	ARG	Patricio Matricardi (from (Greece) Asteras Tripolis)
7	FW	RUS	Nikolai Kipiani (from Rubin Kazan, previously on loan)
9	MF	GEO	Beka Mikeltadze (from Rubin Kazan, previously on loan)
19	FW	RUS	Kirill Kolesnichenko (on loan from (Kazakhstan) Kairat)
20	MF	RUS	Ilya Zhigulyov (on loan from Krasnodar)
23	FW	VEN	Andrés Ponce (on loan from Akhmat Grozny)
25	DF	RUS	Danil Stepanov (on loan from Rubin Kazan)
26	FW	RUS	Aleksandr Saplinov (on loan from Rostov)
27	DF	CIV	Cédric Gogoua (on loan from CSKA Moscow)
33	DF	GEO	Solomon Kvirkvelia (on loan from Lokomotiv Moscow)
46	MF	RUS	Dmitri Sesyavin (from Rotor-2 Volgograd)
47	MF	RUS	Nikita Gavrilov
48	DF	RUS	Rashid Rezyukin
49	MF	RUS	Stepan Karandashev
50	GK	RUS	Roman Mitchenko
51	GK	RUS	Yegor Shulyak
54	DF	RUS	Stanislav Fir
56	DF	RUS	Aleksandr Balakhonov (from Rotor-2 Volgograd)
57	MF	RUS	Aleksandr Gladkov
58	GK	RUS	Daniil Kuznetsov (from Lokomotiv Moscow)
59	FW	RUS	Yaroslav Shcherbin (from Rotor-2 Volgograd)
60	FW	RUS	Yegor Petrov
61	GK	RUS	Nikolai Nelyubov
64	MF	RUS	Stepan Batyutin (from Sochi)
67	DF	RUS	Grigori Tarnov
68	MF	RUS	Kirill Kurdin
73	MF	RUS	Viktor Zherebyatnikov (from Rotor-2 Volgograd)
75	DF	RUS	Mikhail Andreyev
77	MF	GEO	Zuriko Davitashvili (on loan from Rubin Kazan)
78	MF	RUS	Nikita Popov
79	MF	RUS	Dmitri Mikhaylov
81	DF	RUS	Maksim Lavrentyev
82	DF	RUS	Nikita Dundukov
83	DF	RUS	Dmitri Vershkov
84	FW	RUS	Vasili Goloyadov
87	DF	RUS	Damir Kusharov (from Rotor-2 Volgograd)
93	GK	CRO	Josip Čondrić (from (Croatia) Istra 1961)
96	FW	BRA	Flamarion (on loan from (Georgia (country)) Dinamo Batumi)
99	MF	BLR	Vladimir Medved (from Krylia Sovetov Samara)

Out: Note: Flags indicate national team as defined under FIFA eligibility rules; some limited exceptions apply. Players may hold more than one non-FIFA nationality.

No.	Pos.	Nation	Player
2	DF	RUS	Ilya Ionov (to Dynamo Stavropol)
5	DF	RUS	Anton Piskunov (to Chayka Peschanokopskoye)
10	MF	RUS	Albert Sharipov (to Nizhny Novgorod)
10	MF	GEO	Jano Ananidze (released, previously from (Cyprus) Anorthosis Famagusta)
15	MF	RUS	Azim Fatullayev (to Kuban Krasnodar)
21	MF	RUS	Artyom Samsonov (to Shinnik Yaroslavl)
22	MF	RUS	Mukhammad Sultonov (to Nizhny Novgorod)
23	MF	RUS	Gennadi Kiselyov (end of loan from Krylia Sovetov Samara)
24	MF	RUS	Danil Poluboyarinov (to Volgar Astrakhan)
25	MF	RUS	Artyom Popov (to Nizhny Novgorod)
29	DF	UZB	Vitaliy Denisov (to Tom Tomsk)
31	MF	RUS	Denis Tkachuk (to Orenburg)
32	FW	RUS	Anzor Sanaya (to Yenisey Krasnoyarsk)
33	DF	RUS	Igor Udaly
89	FW	RUS	Artyom Galadzhan (end of loan from Lokomotiv Moscow)
90	DF	RUS	Aleksandr Dovbnya (end of loan from Arsenal Tula)
99	MF	RUS	Nikolay Kuznetsov (on loan to Sokol Saratov)
—	DF	RUS	Valeri Pochivalin (to Fakel Voronezh, previously from (Kazakhstan) Irtysh Pavlodar)
—	MF	RUS	Alexey Yevseyev (to Ural Yekaterinburg, previously on loan to Fakel Voronezh)
—	FW	RUS	Eduard Buliya (to SKA-Khabarovsk, previously on loan)

=== Rubin Kazan ===
In: Note: Flags indicate national team as defined under FIFA eligibility rules; some limited exceptions apply. Players may hold more than one non-FIFA nationality.

No.	Pos.	Nation	Player
1	GK	RUS	Nikita Medvedev (from Lokomotiv Moscow)
3	DF	RUS	Mikhail Merkulov (from Ural Yekaterinburg)
6	MF	KOR	Hwang In-beom (from (Canada) Vancouver Whitecaps)
9	FW	SRB	Đorđe Despotović (from Orenburg)
12	MF	RUS	Aleksandr Zuyev (from Rostov, previously on loan)
13	FW	RUS	Kirill Klimov (from (France) Monaco B)
20	MF	RUS	Oleg Shatov (from Zenit St. Petersburg)
28	MF	DEN	Oliver Abildgaard (from (Denmark) AaB, previously on loan)
31	DF	RUS	Georgi Zotov (from Krylia Sovetov Samara)
40	DF	RUS	Bogdan Mikhailichenko (from own academy)
47	FW	RUS	Kirill Kosarev (from Murom)
49	FW	RUS	Danila Strelchuk (from own academy)
53	FW	RUS	Anzor Amiraliyev
54	GK	RUS	Artyom Ismagilov
56	MF	RUS	Lenar Fattakhov (from own academy)
58	MF	RUS	Nikolai Yermolayev (from own academy)
59	FW	RUS	Daniil Motorin
67	DF	RUS	Aleksandr Ivashchov
68	MF	RUS	Aleksandr Ryzhkov (from own academy)
72	MF	RUS	Kamil Sabirzyanov (from own academy)
73	FW	RUS	Artyom Ziyaisov
74	MF	RUS	Aristarkh Mosin (from own academy)
81	GK	RUS	Danila Svetov (from own academy)
94	DF	RUS	Ilsur Valeyev (from own academy)

Out: Note: Flags indicate national team as defined under FIFA eligibility rules; some limited exceptions apply. Players may hold more than one non-FIFA nationality.

No.	Pos.	Nation	Player
1	GK	RUS	David Volk (to Baltika Kaliningrad)
3	DF	RUS	Konstantin Pliyev (end of loan from Rostov)
7	MF	RUS	Vyacheslav Podberyozkin (to Ural Yekaterinburg)
9	FW	RUS	Artur Sagitov (on loan to Volgar Astrakhan, previously on loan to Nizhny Novgorod)
11	MF	GEO	Zuriko Davitashvili (on loan to Rotor Volgograd)
14	DF	RUS	Vladimir Granat
18	MF	RUS	Pavel Mogilevets (to Khimki)
20	FW	RUS	Yevgeni Markov (end of loan from Dynamo Moscow)
27	DF	BRA	Pablo (end of loan from (Portugal) Braga)
31	DF	RUS	Emil Gallyamov
33	DF	UKR	Oleh Danchenko (on loan to Ufa)
36	MF	RUS	Danil Sharafutdinov
40	FW	TJK	Shahrom Samiyev (to (Moldova) Sheriff Tiraspol)
41	DF	RUS	Vladislav Mikushin (on loan to Leningradets Leningrad Oblast, previously on loan to Neftekhimik Nizhnekamsk, previously on loan to Fakel Voronezh)
43	FW	RUS	Danila Yezhkov
45	DF	RUS	Aleksandr Ivankov (to Ural-2 Yekaterinburg)
48	FW	RUS	Dzhosi Dzaurov
49	MF	RUS	Aleksandr Tsiberkin (to Dynamo Bryansk)
50	DF	RUS	Rail Abdullin (released, previously on loan to Neftekhimik Nizhnekamsk)
52	MF	RUS	Denis Fedorochev
53	FW	RUS	Roman Pirmamedov
56	MF	RUS	Maksim Sedov (to Fakel Voronezh)
58	DF	RUS	Stepan Ostanin
59	MF	RUS	Nikita Makarov (on loan to Veles Moscow)
68	MF	RUS	Roman Baluyev (to Tuapse)
69	DF	RUS	Danil Stepanov (on loan to Rotor Volgograd)
71	DF	RUS	Nikolai Poyarkov (end of loan from Rostov)
72	FW	RUS	Nikita Tsygankov
73	FW	RUS	Oleg Crețul (to (Moldova) Petrocub Hîncești)
73	MF	RUS	Igor Nikolov (released, previously on loan to Novosibirsk)
74	MF	RUS	Sergei Chernenko (to Zvezda St. Petersburg)
81	GK	RUS	Tagir Khismatullin
83	DF	RUS	Ruslan Gavrilov
88	MF	RUS	Aleksandr Tashayev (end of loan from Spartak Moscow)
89	MF	RUS	Mikhail Yakovlev (on loan to Neftekhimik Nizhnekamsk, previously on loan to KAMAZ Naberezhnye Chelny)
93	GK	RUS	Aleksei Gorodovoy (on loan to Veles Moscow)
94	MF	RUS	Konstantin Vakhtyorov
99	FW	RUS	Kamil Zakirov (on loan to (Belarus) Minsk, previously on loan to Volgar Astrakhan)
—	MF	GEO	Beka Mikeltadze (to Rotor Volgograd, previously on loan)
—	FW	RUS	Nikolai Kipiani (to Rotor Volgograd, previously on loan)

=== Sochi ===
In: Note: Flags indicate national team as defined under FIFA eligibility rules; some limited exceptions apply. Players may hold more than one non-FIFA nationality.

No.	Pos.	Nation	Player
6	MF	RUS	Artur Yusupov (from Dynamo Moscow)
7	MF	RUS	Danil Prutsev (from Krylia Sovetov Samara)
13	DF	RUS	Sergei Terekhov (on loan from Orenburg)
17	FW	CRO	Marko Dugandžić (from (Romania) Botoșani)
22	MF	RUS	Joãozinho (from Dynamo Moscow)
24	DF	ARG	Emanuel Mammana (on loan from Zenit St. Petersburg)
34	DF	RUS	Timofei Margasov (from Lokomotiv Moscow, previously on loan)
39	DF	RUS	Renat Balkizov (from Strogino Moscow academy)
42	MF	RUS	Nikita Gubin
43	DF	RUS	Fyodor Khudenko
46	MF	RUS	Timofey Shepunov
49	DF	RUS	Aleksandr Mironov (from Spartak Moscow academy)
51	GK	RUS	Kirill Lyashko
52	DF	RUS	Artyom Mironov (from Spartak Moscow academy)
57	DF	RUS	Maksim Grebenyov (from Saturn-Master Yegoryevsk academy)
59	MF	RUS	Stepan Gavrikov
63	DF	RUS	Vladimir Prozorov (from CSKA Moscow academy)
68	MF	RUS	Islam Mokayev
71	MF	BUL	Ivelin Popov (from Rostov)
72	FW	RUS	Daniil Batishchev
76	MF	RUS	Daniil Martovoy
78	FW	RUS	Nikita Kozlov (from Zenit St. Petersburg academy)
79	FW	RUS	Aleksandr Rudenko (on loan from Spartak Moscow)

Out: Note: Flags indicate national team as defined under FIFA eligibility rules; some limited exceptions apply. Players may hold more than one non-FIFA nationality.

No.	Pos.	Nation	Player
5	MF	RUS	Aleksei Pomerko
7	FW	RUS	Dmitry Poloz (to Rostov)
17	MF	RUS	Andrei Mostovoy (end of loan from Zenit St. Petersburg)
20	DF	RUS	Igor Yurganov (on loan to Baltika Kaliningrad, previously on loan to Tambov)
23	DF	FRA	Adil Rami (to (Portugal) Boavista)
42	MF	NGA	Muhammad Ladan (on loan to (Armenia) Pyunik)
43	DF	RUS	Sergei Mikhaylov
46	DF	UKR	Nikita Teplyakov
48	DF	RUS	Semyon Surinovich
49	DF	RUS	Pavel Korkin
51	GK	RUS	Igor Ivanov
59	MF	RUS	Nikita Molochnikov
63	MF	RUS	Daniyar Bikmukhamedov
68	MF	RUS	Stepan Batyutin (to Rotor Volgograd)
72	MF	RUS	Ilya Gorbashov
78	MF	RUS	Beka Dzhanelidze (to (Slovakia) Malacky)
79	MF	RUS	Timofey Kostenko
87	FW	ARM	Aleksandre Karapetian (to Tambov)
90	DF	RUS	Pavel Shakuro (on loan to Irtysh Omsk)
91	FW	RUS	Aleksandr Kokorin (end of loan from Zenit St. Petersburg)
94	MF	MNE	Dušan Lagator (to (Poland) Wisła Płock)
95	MF	COD	Giannelli Imbula (to (France) EA Guingamp)
99	FW	RUS	Viktor Morozov (on loan to Olimp-Dolgoprudny)
—	GK	RUS	Rostislav Soldatenko (to Alania Vladikavkaz, previously on loan)
—	MF	RUS	Pavel Ryabokon (released, previously on loan to Dolgoprudny)

=== Spartak Moscow ===
In: Note: Flags indicate national team as defined under FIFA eligibility rules; some limited exceptions apply. Players may hold more than one non-FIFA nationality.

No.	Pos.	Nation	Player
8	FW	NGA	Victor Moses (on loan from (England) Chelsea)
9	FW	RUS	Aleksandr Kokorin (from Zenit St. Petersburg)
15	MF	RUS	Maksim Glushenkov (end of loan to Krylia Sovetov Samara)
20	MF	UZB	Oston Urunov (from Ufa)
34	DF	RUS	Nikita Khodorchenko
40	DF	RUS	Yaroslav Krashevsky (from own academy)
41	MF	RUS	Ivan Pyatkin (from Rotor Volgograd academy)
43	DF	RUS	Damir Shaykhtdinov (from own academy)
45	MF	RUS	Yegor Loshkov
46	MF	RUS	Artur Tumanyan (from own academy)
48	MF	RUS	Yegor Saygushev (from Master-Saturn Yegoryevsk academy)
49	MF	RUS	Pavel Trifonov (from own academy)
51	MF	RUS	Nikita Trapitsyn (from own academy)
52	MF	RUS	Mikhail Pilipenko (from own academy)
58	GK	RUS	Semyon Fadeyev
62	DF	RUS	Yegor Chistyakov (from own academy)
64	DF	RUS	Maksim Vedeneyev
69	MF	RUS	Aleksandr Bezchasnyuk (from Master-Saturn Yegoryevsk)
73	MF	RUS	Vladislav Shitov (from own academy)
76	FW	RUS	Vitali Shitov (from own academy)
77	FW	RUS	Aleksandr Sobolev (from Krylia Sovetov Samara, previously on loan)
83	MF	RUS	Maksim Laykin (from own academy)
86	FW	RUS	Timur Osmolovskiy (free agent, last at (Russia) CSKA Moscow)
88	MF	RUS	Aleksandr Tashayev (end of loan to Rubin Kazan)
94	DF	RUS	Ilya Detyonyshev (from own academy)
95	GK	RUS	Mikhail Volkov

Out: Note: Flags indicate national team as defined under FIFA eligibility rules; some limited exceptions apply. Players may hold more than one non-FIFA nationality.

No.	Pos.	Nation	Player
4	MF	RUS	Nikolai Tyunin (retired)
7	MF	RUS	Ayaz Guliyev (not registered with the league)
8	MF	NED	Guus Til (on loan to (Germany) SC Freiburg)
20	FW	GER	André Schürrle (end of loan from (Germany) Borussia Dortmund)
25	FW	PAR	Lorenzo Melgarejo (to (Argentina) Racing)
28	FW	SEN	Thierno Thioub
41	MF	RUS	Mark Krotov
43	MF	RUS	Pyotr Volodkin (to Chayka Peschanokopskoye)
45	FW	POR	Idrisa Sambú (to (Romania) Gaz Metan Mediaș)
46	DF	RUS	Artyom Gorbulin (to Avangard Kursk)
48	GK	RUS	Daniil Yarusov (to Chayka Peschanokopskoye)
49	DF	RUS	Roman Shishkin (to Znamya Noginsk)
51	MF	RUS	Nikita Miroshnichenko (to Nosta Novotroitsk)
52	DF	RUS	Albert Khabirov (to Nosta Novotroitsk)
59	DF	CMR	Audrey Zepatta
62	DF	RUS	Vyacheslav Frolov (to Khimki)
64	MF	RUS	Daniil Grigoryev
70	MF	RUS	Ivan Repyakh
76	MF	RUS	Maksim Kalachevsky
77	MF	RUS	Reziuan Mirzov (on loan to Khimki)
78	MF	RUS	Maksim Danilin
92	DF	RUS	Nikolai Rasskazov (on loan to Arsenal Tula)
—	MF	RUS	Aleksandr Lomovitsky (on loan to Arsenal Tula, previously on loan to Khimki, previously on loan to Arsenal Tula)
—	MF	RUS	Artyom Timofeyev (on loan to Akhmat Grozny, previously on loan to Krylia Sovetov Samara)
—	FW	RUS	Georgi Melkadze (on loan to Akhmat Grozny, previously on loan to Tambov)
—	FW	RUS	Aleksandr Rudenko (on loan to Sochi, previously on loan to Torpedo Moscow)

=== Tambov ===
In: Note: Flags indicate national team as defined under FIFA eligibility rules; some limited exceptions apply. Players may hold more than one non-FIFA nationality.

No.	Pos.	Nation	Player
1	GK	RUS	Sergey Ryzhikov (from Krylia Sovetov Samara)
7	MF	UZB	Jasurbek Jaloliddinov (on loan from Lokomotiv Moscow)
9	FW	RUS	German Onugkha (on loan from Krasnodar)
11	DF	BLR	Maksim Valadzko (from Arsenal Tula)
13	DF	RUS	Vitali Shakhov (from Orenburg)
16	GK	RUS	Nikolai Slavin
17	DF	RUS	Zurab Gigashvili (free agent, last with Armavir)
18	DF	ARM	Varazdat Haroyan (from Ural Yekaterinbureg)
19	MF	GHA	Mohammed Rabiu (from (France) Paris FC)
20	DF	RUS	Ivan Ovsyannikov
23	MF	RUS	Vladimir Gosinkeyev
27	DF	RUS	Aleksei Gritsayenko (from Krasnodar, previously on loan)
31	MF	LUX	Sébastien Thill (on loan from (Luxembourg) Progrès Niederkorn)
32	DF	RUS	Aleksandr Yevtin
33	MF	RUS	Aleksei Popov
44	DF	RUS	Nikita Chicherin (from Krylia Sovetov Samara)
48	DF	RUS	Andrei Komov
49	MF	RUS	Danila Zhivilkov
53	GK	RUS	Maksim Mikhalyov (from Spartak Moscow academy)
68	MF	RUS	Aleksandr Malin
69	DF	RUS	Dmitri Ignatenko
70	MF	RUS	Georgi Mdzeluri
72	DF	RUS	Mikhail Smolyakov
78	DF	RUS	Ivan Bzikadze
79	MF	RUS	Yegor Tsvetkov
87	FW	ARM	Aleksandre Karapetian (from Sochi)
89	DF	RUS	Vadim Medvedev (from Zenit St. Petersburg academy)
99	MF	RUS	Artyom Doronin (from Ryazan)

Out: Note: Flags indicate national team as defined under FIFA eligibility rules; some limited exceptions apply. Players may hold more than one non-FIFA nationality.

No.	Pos.	Nation	Player
1	DF	RUS	Tamerlan Gabuyev
4	FW	NGA	Fanen Akyam
6	MF	CIV	Geo Danny Ekra
7	MF	POR	Miguel Cardoso (end of loan from Dynamo Moscow)
7	MF	RUS	Nikita Salamatov (to Irtysh Omsk)
7	FW	UKR	Vitaliy Balashov (released, previously from (Ukraine) Olimpik Donetsk)
9	FW	RUS	Khasan Mamtov (to Kuban Krasnodar)
10	FW	RUS	Ishkhan Geloyan (to Baltika Kaliningrad)
10	FW	RUS	Kirill Panchenko (to Arsenal Tula, previously from Dynamo Moscow)
11	FW	RUS	Artyom Fedchuk (on loan to Nizhny Novgorod)
12	GK	UKR	Dmytro Kosiakov
12	DF	RUS	Aleksandr Golovnya (end of loan from Rodina Moscow)
13	FW	RUS	Vladimir Obukhov (to Rostov)
14	FW	RUS	Amur Kalmykov (to Torpedo Moscow, previously from Armavir)
15	DF	RUS	Oleksandr Filin (end of loan from Khimki)
17	MF	RUS	Khetag Khosonov (end of loan from CSKA Moscow)
19	FW	RUS	Georgi Melkadze (end of loan from Spartak Moscow)
20	MF	RUS	Vladislav Vlasov
22	DF	RUS	Igor Yurganov (end of loan from Sochi)
31	DF	RUS	Kirill Bolshakov (to SKA-Khabarovsk)
33	MF	RUS	Yevgeni Morev (to Kafa Feodosia)
34	DF	UKR	Anton Fedorenko
44	MF	RUS	Denis Lenyo
47	DF	RUS	Kamil Salakhetdinov
55	MF	UKR	Denis Romashev (to (Ukraine) Mynai U-21)
56	MF	RUS	Vildan Yermilov (to Dynamo Stavropol)
66	MF	RUS	Daniil Mishutin (to Kafa Feodosia)
68	DF	RUS	Igor Dvoryashin
70	MF	GHA	Sulley Muniru
71	DF	RUS	Renat Bagdashkin (to Luki-Energiya Velikiye Luki)
74	MF	RUS	Anton Arkhipov
80	DF	RUS	Yegor Badyin
88	GK	RUS	Giorgi Shelia (to Akhmat Grozny)
95	MF	RUS	Adam Katsayev
96	FW	RUS	Mikhail Usanin
97	MF	RUS	Merad Chikhradze
—	GK	RUS	Vladimir Sugrobov (to SKA-Khabarovsk, previously on loan to (Armenia) Pyunik)
—	DF	RUS	Andrei Yakovlev (to Leningradets Leningrad Oblast, previously on loan to Zvezda St. Petersburg)
—	MF	UZB	Vagiz Galiulin (to Neftekhimik Nizhnekamsk, previously on loan)
—	FW	RUS	Artyom Arkhipov (on loan to (Belarus) Shakhtyor Soligorsk, previously on loan to (Belarus) Gorodeya)

=== Ufa ===
In: Note: Flags indicate national team as defined under FIFA eligibility rules; some limited exceptions apply. Players may hold more than one non-FIFA nationality.

No.	Pos.	Nation	Player
2	DF	RUS	Grigori Morozov (on loan from Dynamo Moscow)
15	DF	RUS	Konstantin Pliyev (on loan from Rostov)
18	FW	SRB	Komnen Andrić (on loan from (Croatia) Dinamo Zagreb)
22	MF	RUS	Artyom Golubev (from Krasnodar, previously on loan)
24	MF	CRO	Filip Mrzljak (from (Romania) Dinamo București)
29	MF	RUS	Vladislav Kamilov (from SKA-Khabarovsk)
44	DF	RUS	Sergei Borodin (on loan from Krasnodar)
47	FW	RUS	Yevgeni Yegorov
66	MF	RUS	Artyom Pikarev (from Dynamo Moscow academy)
75	FW	RUS	Timur Zhamaletdinov (from CSKA Moscow)
80	DF	RUS	Dmitri Malyshev
87	MF	RUS	Igor Bezdenezhnykh (end of loan to Chayka Peschanokopskoye)
92	MF	RUS	Lev Safronov
94	DF	UKR	Oleh Danchenko (on loan from Rubin Kazan)
99	MF	UKR	Akhmed Alibekov (on loan from (Ukraine) Dynamo Kyiv)

Out: Note: Flags indicate national team as defined under FIFA eligibility rules; some limited exceptions apply. Players may hold more than one non-FIFA nationality.

No.	Pos.	Nation	Player
2	DF	RUS	Danil Krugovoy (end of loan from Zenit St. Petersburg)
6	MF	UZB	Oston Urunov (to Spartak Moscow)
9	DF	RUS	Denis Terentyev (end of loan from Zenit St. Petersburg)
10	MF	LUX	Olivier Thill
15	DF	RUS	Aleksandr Putsko (to Akhmat Grozny)
17	MF	RUS	Nikolai Giorgobiani (on loan to Alania Vladikavkaz)
23	MF	RUS	Danila Yemelyanov (on loan to Volgar Astrakhan)
27	DF	ROU	Ionuț Nedelcearu (to (Greece) AEK Athens)
32	FW	SVN	Andrés Vombergar (to (Slovenia) Olimpija Ljubljana)
47	MF	RUS	Artyom Yegorov
52	GK	RUS	Rem Saitgareyev (to Volga Ulyanovsk)
60	MF	RUS	Ilya Beganskiy
66	FW	RUS	Artur Mulyukov
68	DF	RUS	Albert Gilmanshin
69	DF	RUS	Nikita Popov
70	FW	RUS	Igor Andreyev (to Nosta Novotroitsk)
73	MF	RUS	Andrei Podgornov
74	MF	RUS	Daniil Fomin (to Dynamo Moscow)
75	DF	RUS	Vladimir Gerasimov
79	DF	RUS	Danila Sorokin
80	MF	RUS	Arseni Zdorovets
85	DF	RUS	Ilya Shudrov
87	MF	RUS	Igor Bezdenezhnykh (on loan to Chayka Peschanokopskoye)
88	MF	RUS	Rodion Zikrach
90	MF	RUS	Danil Yevsyukov
91	MF	RUS	Andrey Vlasov (to Yessentuki)
92	DF	RUS	Vyacheslav Dyomin (to Chelyabinsk)
93	MF	RUS	Mikhail Izvekov
94	FW	RUS	Linar Mukhametshin
98	MF	RUS	Yegor Podznyakov (to Chita)
99	FW	RUS	Andrei Kozlov (to Orenburg)
—	MF	RUS	Andrei Batyutin (to SKA-Khabarovsk, previously on loan to Avangard Kursk)
—	FW	NGA	Sylvester Igboun (to Dynamo Moscow, previously on loan)

=== Ural Yekaterinburg ===
In: Note: Flags indicate national team as defined under FIFA eligibility rules; some limited exceptions apply. Players may hold more than one non-FIFA nationality.

No.	Pos.	Nation	Player
1	GK	RUS	Ilya Pomazun (on loan from CSKA Moscow)
4	DF	NOR	Stefan Strandberg (from (Italy) Trapani)
7	FW	RUS	David Karayev (from KAMAZ Naberezhnye Chelny)
18	MF	SRB	Branko Jovičić (from (Serbia) Red Star Belgrade)
19	MF	CRO	Danijel Miškić (from Orenburg)
21	MF	RUS	Vyacheslav Podberyozkin (from Rubin Kazan)
26	MF	RUS	Anton Chebykin
30	MF	RUS	Alexey Yevseyev (from Rotor Volgograd)
34	MF	RUS	Daniil Gerasimov
37	GK	RUS	Dmitri Lebedev
39	MF	RUS	Arseni Yermakov
41	DF	RUS	Nikita Kuznetsov
44	DF	RUS	Vladimir Rykov (from Dynamo Moscow)
46	MF	RUS	Aleksandr Nechayev
48	DF	RUS	Roman Silman
51	MF	RUS	Artyom Kulikov
53	MF	RUS	Surkhaykhan Abdullayev
56	MF	RUS	Sergei Loskutov
57	DF	RUS	Ilya Tkachenko
61	MF	RUS	Aleksandr Chernyshyov
63	MF	RUS	Artyom Suyetin
64	DF	RUS	Yegor Zubarev
66	DF	RUS	Kirill Dervenyov
68	FW	RUS	Ilya Grinyuk (from Chertanovo Education Center)
73	MF	RUS	Artyom Parshukov
75	DF	RUS	Nikita Chistyakov (end of loan to Chayka Peschanokopskoye)
86	GK	RUS	Maksim Moskovets
91	FW	RUS	Grigori Malafeyev

Out: Note: Flags indicate national team as defined under FIFA eligibility rules; some limited exceptions apply. Players may hold more than one non-FIFA nationality.

No.	Pos.	Nation	Player
3	DF	ARM	Varazdat Haroyan (to Tambov)
4	DF	RUS	Artyom Mamin (on loan to Orenburg)
5	DF	POL	Maciej Wilusz (to (Poland) Raków Częstochowa)
9	MF	SUI	Marco Aratore (to (Switzerland) Aarau, previously on loan to (Switzerland) Lugano)
13	DF	CMR	Petrus Boumal (to (Turkey) BB Erzurumspor)
17	FW	BUL	Nikolay Dimitrov (retired)
18	MF	POL	Michał Kucharczyk (to (Poland) Pogoń Szczecin)
19	DF	BLR	Dzyanis Palyakow (to (Kazakhstan) Kairat)
21	DF	RUS	Islamzhan Nasyrov (on loan to Orenburg)
27	DF	RUS	Mikhail Merkulov (to Rubin Kazan)
33	GK	RUS	Vladimir Kutyryov
34	MF	RUS	Yan Chizhkov
41	MF	RUS	Konstantin Malitskiy
46	GK	RUS	Sergei Dudin
51	MF	RUS	Aleksandr Volchkov (to Krylia Sovetov-2 Samara)
53	DF	RUS	Pavel Nevidomy
55	GK	RUS	Aleksandr Medvedev
56	MF	RUS	Vasili Koryukov
57	MF	RUS	Artyom Fidler (retired)
60	GK	RUS	Vladislav Poletayev (on loan to Irtysh Omsk)
64	MF	RUS	Maksim Kryukov (to Khimik-Arsenal)
65	MF	RUS	Aleksandr Galimov (to Yenisey Krasnoyarsk)
67	MF	RUS	Maks Zhestaryov
71	GK	RUS	Aleksei Mamin (on loan to KAMAZ Naberezhnye Chelny)
72	MF	RUS	Lev Tolkachyov (to Ural-2 Yekaterinburg)
73	MF	RUS	Ilya Korelin
77	GK	RUS	Oleg Baklov (not registered with the league)
78	MF	RUS	Aleksandr Nekrasov
79	FW	RUS	Artyom Yusupov (on loan to Orenburg)
81	MF	RUS	Ilya Nekrasov (to Ural-2 Yekaterinburg)
83	DF	RUS	Gleb Geykin (to Ural-2 Yekaterinburg)
86	MF	RUS	Maksim Prokopyev
97	DF	RUS	Andrei Khityayev (to Ural-2 Yekaterinburg)
—	MF	RUS	Nikita Glushkov (to Yenisey Krasnoyarsk, previously on loan to Baltika Kaliningrad)
—	MF	RUS	Aleksandr Lomakin (to Yenisey Krasnoyarsk, previously on loan)

=== Zenit Saint Petersburg ===
In: Note: Flags indicate national team as defined under FIFA eligibility rules; some limited exceptions apply. Players may hold more than one non-FIFA nationality.

No.	Pos.	Nation	Player
2	DF	RUS	Dmitri Chistyakov (on loan from Rostov)
4	DF	RUS	Danil Krugovoy (end of loan to Ufa)
6	DF	CRO	Dejan Lovren (from (England) Liverpool)
17	MF	RUS	Andrei Mostovoy (end of loan to Sochi)
20	MF	BRA	Wendel (from (Portugal) Sporting CP)
47	DF	RUS	Valentin Solodarenko (on loan from Tuapse)
48	DF	RUS	Arseni Zigangirov
63	DF	RUS	Nikolai Tarasov (on loan from Olimp-Dolgoprudny)
36	FW	RUS	Stanislav Krapukhin (from Zvezda St. Petersburg)
39	DF	RUS	Vasili Zapryagayev (from Tom Tomsk)
59	FW	RUS	Yegor Shapovalov (from CSKA Moscow)
65	DF	RUS	Yevgeni Panteleychuk (from own academy)
66	GK	RUS	Aleksandr Shipilov
67	MF	RUS	Yaroslav Mikhaylov (from own academy)
69	FW	RUS	Ilya Rodionov
72	MF	RUS	Yevgeni Kim (from own academy)
73	DF	RUS	Andrei Maryanov
83	MF	RUS	Georgi Chelidze (from (Armenia) Ararat Yerevan)
84	DF	RUS	Viktor Kovrizhnikov
85	FW	RUS	Daniil Kuznetsov
90	FW	RUS	Aleksandr Yelovskikh (from Zvezda St. Petersburg)
98	DF	RUS	Vladislav Masalsky (from Murom)

Out: Note: Flags indicate national team as defined under FIFA eligibility rules; some limited exceptions apply. Players may hold more than one non-FIFA nationality.

No.	Pos.	Nation	Player
4	DF	VEN	Yordan Osorio (end of loan from (Portugal) Porto)
6	DF	SRB	Branislav Ivanović (to (England) West Bromwich Albion)
10	MF	ARG	Emiliano Rigoni (to (Spain) Elche)
17	MF	RUS	Oleg Shatov (to Rubin Kazan)
19	DF	RUS	Igor Smolnikov (to Krasnodar)
24	DF	ARG	Emanuel Mammana (on loan to Sochi)
34	DF	RUS	Denis Terentyev (to Rostov, previously on loan to Ufa)
39	MF	RUS	Vladimir Khubulov (end of loan from Akhmat Grozny)
43	DF	RUS	Aleksandr Boldyrev (to Nosta Novotroitsk)
48	FW	RUS	Viktor Kozyrev (to Smolensk)
59	FW	RUS	Yegor Krupenin
61	MF	RUS	Dmitri Kirillov
63	DF	RUS	Maksim Smirnov
65	MF	RUS	Maksim Bachinsky (to Tekstilshchik Ivanovo)
66	DF	RUS	Samir Bayramov (retired)
67	FW	RUS	Aleksei Smirnov
70	GK	RUS	Nikita Goylo (on loan to Akron Tolyatti)
74	MF	RUS	Sergei Ivanov (on loan to (Slovakia) Zemplín Michalovce, previously on loan to Krylia Sovetov Samara)
80	DF	RUS	Ilya Skrobotov
84	FW	RUS	Ilya Vorobyov (on loan to Orenburg, previously on loan to Khimki)
85	GK	RUS	Vladislav Bakonin (to (Belarus) Energetik-BGU Minsk)
88	MF	RUS	Dmitry Bogayev
90	FW	RUS	Aleksei Gasilin (end of loan from Tom Tomsk)
96	DF	RUS	Tomas Rukas (to Yenisey Krasnoyarsk)
—	GK	RUS	Igor Obukhov (to SKA-Khabarovsk, previously on loan)
—	DF	RUS	Aleksandr Anyukov (retired, previously on loan to Krylia Sovetov Samara)
—	DF	RUS	Nikita Kakkoyev (to Nizhny Novgorod, previously on loan to Tom Tomsk)
—	DF	RUS	Anton Sinyak (to Tom Tomsk, previously on loan)
—	MF	BRA	Hernani (to (Italy) Parma, previously on loan)
—	MF	RUS	Daniil Lesovoy (to Arsenal Tula, previously on loan)
—	MF	RUS	Dmitri Pletnyov (to Baltika Kaliningrad, previously on loan to Tom Tomsk)
—	FW	RUS	Aleksandr Kokorin (to Spartak Moscow, previously on loan to Sochi)
—	FW	RUS	Nikolai Prudnikov (to Orenburg-2, previously on loan to Chertanovo Moscow)
