= 2020–21 FC Rubin Kazan season =

Rubin Kazan
2020–21 season
- Chairman: Ilsur Metshin
- Manager: Leonid Slutsky
- Stadium: Ak Bars Arena
- Premier League: 4th
- Russian Cup: Round of 32
- Top goalscorer: League: Đorđe Despotović (14); All: Đorđe Despotović (14)
- Highest home attendance: 18,465 vs Spartak Moscow (20 September 2020)
- Lowest home attendance: 3,011 vs Rostov (22 November 2020)
- Average home league attendance: 7,403 (2 May 2021)
Home colours	Away colours

The 2020–21 FC Rubin Kazan season was the eighteenth successive season that Rubin Kazan played in the Russian Premier League, the highest tier of association football in Russia. Rubin Kazan finished the season in 4th position, qualifying for the UEFA Europa Conference League, and where knocked out of the Russian Cup at the Round of 32 stage.

== Season events ==
On 29 July, Rubin announced the signing of Oleg Shatov from Zenit St.Petersburg.

On 10 August, Rubin signed Aleksandr Zuyev to a four-year contract from Rostov after Zuyev had spent the 2019–20 season on loan at Rubin.

On 14 August, Rubin announced the signing of Hwang In-beom to a three-year contract from Vancouver Whitecaps.

On 17 August, Shahrom Samiyev left Rubin Kazan to sign for Sheriff Tiraspol, and Rubin announced the signings of Nikita Medvedev from Lokomotiv Moscow and Georgi Zotov from Krylia Sovetov.

On 20 August, Zuriko Davitashvili joined Rotor Volgograd on a season-long loan deal.

On 14 December, Rubin announced the signing of Mitsuki Saito on an 18-month loan deal from Shonan Bellmare, with an option to make the move permanent.

On 17 December, Dmitri Tarasov left Rubin after his contract expired.

On 12 January, Arsenal Tula announced the signing of Igor Konovalov on loan from Rubin Kazan for the remainder of the season.

== Squad ==
As of match played 16 May 2021

No.	Name	Nationality	Position	Date of birth (age)	Signed from	Signed in	Contract ends	Apps.	Goals
Goalkeepers
1	Nikita Medvedev	(Russia)	GK	17 December 1994 (age 31)	Lokomotiv Moscow	2020	2022	5	0
22	Yury Dyupin	(Russia)	GK	17 March 1988 (age 38)	Anzhi Makhachkala	2019	2020	57	0
Defenders
2	Carl Starfelt	(Sweden)	DF	1 June 1995 (age 31)	IFK Göteborg	2019	2023	42	3
3	Mikhail Merkulov	(Russia)	DF	26 January 1994 (age 32)	Ural Yekaterinburg	2020	2022	9	0
4	Silvije Begić	(Croatia)	DF	3 June 1993 (age 33)	Orenburg	2019	2023	20	1
5	Filip Uremović	(Croatia)	DF	11 February 1997 (age 29)	Olimpija Ljubljana	2018		76	1
27	Aleksei Gritsayenko	(Russia)	DF	25 May 1995 (age 31)	Tambov	2021		0	0
31	Georgi Zotov	(Russia)	DF	12 January 1990 (age 36)	Krylia Sovetov	2020	2021	19	0
77	Ilya Samoshnikov	(Russia)	DF	14 November 1997 (age 28)	Torpedo Moscow	2020		32	2
Midfielders
6	Hwang In-beom	(South Korea)	MF	20 September 1996 (age 29)	Vancouver Whitecaps	2020	2023	20	4
8	Darko Jevtić	(Switzerland)	MF	8 February 1993 (age 33)	Lech Poznań	2020	2023	37	3
12	Aleksandr Zuyev	(Russia)	MF	26 June 1996 (age 30)	Rostov	2020	2024	43	0
14	Mikhail Kostyukov	(Russia)	MF	9 August 1991 (age 35)	Tambov	2021		8	1
20	Oleg Shatov	(Russia)	MF	29 July 1990 (age 36)	Zenit St.Petersburg	2020	2022	21	1
21	Khvicha Kvaratskhelia	(Georgia (country))	MF	12 February 2001 (age 25)	Rustavi	2019	2024	51	7
25	Denis Makarov	(Russia)	MF	18 February 1998 (age 28)	Neftekhimik Nizhnekamsk	2020	2023	39	11
28	Oliver Abildgaard	(Denmark)	MF	10 June 1996 (age 30)	loan from AaB	2020	2020	40	0
38	Leon Musayev	(Russia)	MF	25 January 1999 (age 27)	Zenit St.Petersburg	2021		10	0
59	Nikita Makarov	(Russia)	MF	2 January 2001 (age 25)	Academy	2019		3	0
87	Soltmurad Bakayev	(Russia)	MF	5 August 1999 (age 27)	Spartak Moscow	2020	2024	40	3
99	Kamil Zakirov	(Russia)	MF	15 November 1998 (age 27)	Anzhi Makhachkala	2019	2023	3	0
	Mitsuki Saito	(Japan)	MF	10 January 1999 (age 27)	loan from Shonan Bellmare	2020	2022	0	0
Forwards
9	Đorđe Despotović	(Serbia)	FW	4 March 1992 (age 34)	Orenburg	2020	2023	26	14
19	Ivan Ignatyev	(Russia)	FW	6 January 1999 (age 27)	Krasnodar	2020	2024	30	3
Away on loan
10	Igor Konovalov	(Russia)	MF	8 July 1996 (age 30)	Kuban Krasnodar	2018		72	3
11	Zuriko Davitashvili	(Georgia (country))	MF	15 February 2001 (age 25)	Locomotive Tbilisi	2019		28	2
13	Kirill Klimov	(Russia)	FW	30 January 2001 (age 25)	Academy	2020		4	0
23	Ivan Konovalov	(Russia)	GK	18 August 1994 (age 32)	Torpedo-BelAZ Zhodino	2018	2022	22	0
41	Vladislav Mikushin	(Russia)	DF	18 April 2001 (age 25)	Academy	2017		1	0
47	Kirill Kosarev	(Russia)	FW	1 August 2001 (age 25)	Murom	2020		4	0
51	Ilya Agapov	(Russia)	DF	21 January 2001 (age 25)	Academy	2019		0	0
69	Danil Stepanov	(Russia)	DF	25 January 2000 (age 26)	Academy	2018		20	0
93	Aleksei Gorodovoy	(Russia)	GK	10 August 1993 (age 33)	Kongsvinger	2019		0	0
	Mikhail Yakovlev	(Russia)	MF	4 March 1999 (age 27)	Academy	2016		0	0
Players that left Rubin Kazan during the season
7	Vyacheslav Podberyozkin	(Russia)	MF	21 June 1992 (age 34)	Krasnodar	2018		53	2
15	Dmitri Tarasov	(Russia)	MF	18 March 1987 (age 39)		2020	2020	13	0
18	Pavel Mogilevets	(Russia)	MF	25 January 1993 (age 33)	Rostov	2018		76	2
33	Oleh Danchenko	(Ukraine)	DF	1 August 1994 (age 32)	Shakhtar Donetsk	2019	2023	20	0
40	Shahrom Samiyev	(Tajikistan)	FW	8 February 2001 (age 25)	Istiklol	2020		0	0
	Artur Sagitov	(Russia)	FW	7 January 2000 (age 26)	Academy	2018		14	1

=== On loan ===
Note: Flags indicate national team as defined under FIFA eligibility rules; some limited exceptions apply. Players may hold more than one non-FIFA nationality.

No.	Pos.	Nation	Player
10	MF	RUS	Igor Konovalov (at Arsenal Tula)
11	MF	GEO	Zuriko Davitashvili (at Rotor Volgograd)
13	FW	RUS	Kirill Klimov (at Tambov)
23	GK	RUS	Ivan Konovalov (at Ural Yekaterinburg)
41	DF	RUS	Vladislav Mikushin (at Neftekhimik Nizhnekamsk)
47	FW	RUS	Kirill Kosarev (at Tambov)

No.	Pos.	Nation	Player
51	DF	RUS	Ilya Agapov (at Neftekhimik Nizhnekamsk)
59	MF	RUS	Nikita Makarov (at Veles Moscow)
69	DF	RUS	Danil Stepanov (at Rotor Volgograd)
93	GK	RUS	Aleksei Gorodovoy (at SKA-Khabarovsk)
—	MF	RUS	Mikhail Yakovlev (at Neftekhimik Nizhnekamsk)

== Transfers ==
=== In ===
Date	Position	Nationality	Name	From	Fee	Ref.
29 July 2020	MF	(Russia)	Oleg Shatov	Zenit St.Petersburg	Free	
10 August 2020	MF	(Russia)	Aleksandr Zuyev	Rostov	Undisclosed	
14 August 2020	MF	(South Korea)	Hwang In-beom	Vancouver Whitecaps FC	Undisclosed	
17 August 2020	GK	(Russia)	Nikita Medvedev	Lokomotiv Moscow	Undisclosed	
17 August 2020	DF	(Russia)	Georgi Zotov	Krylia Sovetov	Undisclosed	
29 January 2021	MF	(Russia)	Leon Musayev	Zenit St.Petersburg	Undisclosed	
1 February 2021	DF	(Russia)	Aleksei Gritsayenko	Tambov	Undisclosed	
1 February 2021	MF	(Russia)	Mikhail Kostyukov	Tambov	Undisclosed	

=== Loans in ===
Date from	Position	Nationality	Name	From	Date to	Ref.
14 December 2020	MF	(Japan)	Mitsuki Saito	Shonan Bellmare	30 June 2022	

=== Out ===
Date	Position	Nationality	Name	To	Fee	Ref.
17 August 2020	FW	(Tajikistan)	Shahrom Samiyev	Sheriff Tiraspol	Undisclosed	
18 August 2020	MF	(Russia)	Vyacheslav Podberyozkin	Ural Yekaterinburg	Undisclosed	
31 January 2021	DF	(Ukraine)	Oleh Danchenko	AEK Athens	Undisclosed	

=== Loans out ===
Date from	Position	Nationality	Name	To	Date to	Ref.
Summer 2020	DF	(Russia)	Ilya Agapov	Neftekhimik Nizhnekamsk	End of season	
Summer 2020	FW	(Russia)	Artur Sagitov	Volgar Astrakhan	End of season	
17 June 2020	GK	(Russia)	Aleksei Gorodovoy	Veles Moscow	25 January 2021	
15 July 2020	DF	(Russia)	Vladislav Mikushin	Neftekhimik Nizhnekamsk	End of season	
15 July 2020	MF	(Russia)	Mikhail Yakovlev	Neftekhimik Nizhnekamsk	End of season	
15 July 2020	MF	(Russia)	Nikita Makarov	Veles Moscow	End of season	
17 July 2020	DF	(Russia)	Danil Stepanov	Rotor Volgograd	End of season	
15 August 2020	DF	(Ukraine)	Oleh Danchenko	Ufa	31 January 2021	
20 August 2020	MF	(Georgia (country))	Zuriko Davitashvili	Rotor Volgograd	End of season	
12 January 2021	MF	(Russia)	Igor Konovalov	Arsenal Tula	End of season	
25 January 2021	MF	(Russia)	Ivan Konovalov	Ural Yekaterinburg	End of season	
27 January 2021	GK	(Russia)	Aleksei Gorodovoy	SKA-Khabarovsk	End of season	
20 February 2021	FW	(Russia)	Kirill Klimov	Tambov	End of season	
20 February 2021	FW	(Russia)	Kirill Kosarev	Arsenal Tula	End of season	

=== Released ===
Date	Position	Nationality	Name	Joined	Date	Ref.
11 August 2020	GK	(Russia)	David Volk	Baltika Kaliningrad		
16 October 2020	MF	(Russia)	Pavel Mogilevets	Khimki	16 October 2020	
17 December 2020	MF	(Russia)	Dmitri Tarasov	Veles Moscow		
18 January 2021	FW	(Russia)	Artur Sagitov	Veles Moscow		
31 May 2021	GK	(Russia)	Matvey Tyurin	Nizhny Novgorod		
31 May 2021	DF	(Russia)	Vyacheslav Fomin	Amkar Perm		
31 May 2021	DF	(Russia)	Artur Koloskov	Baltika-BFU Kaliningrad		
31 May 2021	DF	(Russia)	Bogdan Mikhaylichenko	Saturn Ramenskoye		
31 May 2021	DF	(Russia)	Saveli Ratnikov	Irtysh Omsk		
31 May 2021	DF	(Russia)	Mikhail Smolyakov	Rotor-2 Volgograd		
31 May 2021	MF	(Russia)	Nikita Makarov			
31 May 2021	MF	(Russia)	Aleksandr Ryzhkov	Znamya Noginsk		
31 May 2021	FW	(Russia)	Anzor Amiraliyev	Sochi		
31 May 2021	FW	(Russia)	Anton Sholokh	Nosta Novotroitsk		

== Friendlies ==
5 February 2021	Dynamo Moscow	3 – 2	Rubin Kazan	Belek, Turkey
14:30 MSK (UTC+3)	Szymański 18'; Fomin 41' (pen.); Slepov (yellow card) 45+2'; Pliyev (yellow card) 51' (yellow-red card) 52'; Komlichenko 90+3'	Report	Medvedev (yellow card) 41'; Despotović 45+3' (pen.), 53'; Shatov (yellow card) 57'; Kostyukov (yellow card) 90+2'

== Competitions ==
=== Premier League ===
==== League table ====
Pos	Team	Pld	W	D	L	GF	GA	GD	Pts	Qualification or relegation
2	Spartak Moscow	30	17	6	7	56	37	+19	57	Qualification for the Champions League third qualifying round
3	Lokomotiv Moscow	30	17	5	8	45	35	+10	56	Qualification for the Europa League group stage (Note: FC Lokomotiv Moscow qualified for the Europa League group stage by winning the 2020–21 Russian Cup. The Europa Conference League spot awarded to the third-placed team is passed to fourth-placed team, and the spot awarded to the fourth-placed team is passed to fifth-placed team.)
4	Rubin Kazan	30	16	5	9	42	33	+9	53 (Note: Head-to-head points: Rubin 3, Sochi 3. Overall matches won: Rubin 16, Sochi 15.)	Qualification for the Europa Conference League third qualifying round
5	Sochi	30	15	8	7	49	33	+16	53	Qualification for the Europa Conference League second qualifying round
6	CSKA Moscow	30	15	5	10	51	33	+18	50 (Note: Head-to-head points: CSKA 3, Dynamo 3. Head-to-head goal difference: CSKA +1, Dynamo -1.)	

Source: Premier Liga
Rules for classification: 1) Points; 2) Head-to-head points; 3) Head-to-head matches won; 4) Head-to-head goal difference; 5) Head-to-head goals scored; 6) Matches won; 7) Goal difference; 8) Goals scored; 9) Play-off.

==== Results summary ====
Overall								Home						Away					
Pld	W	D	L	GF	GA	GD	Pts	W	D	L	GF	GA	GD	W	D	L	GF	GA	GD
30	16	5	9	42	33	+9	53	6	4	5	18	17	+1	10	1	4	24	16	+8

Last updated: 16 May 2021.
Source: See Results

==== Results by round ====
Round	1	2	3	4	5	6	7	8	9	10	11	12	13	14	15	16	17	18	19	20	21	22	23	24	25	26	27	28	29	30
Ground	H	H	A	A	H	H	A	H	A	H	A	A	H	A	H	H	A	A	A	A	H	A	H	H	A	A	H	H	A	H
Result	L	D	L	W	W	D	W	L	W	D	L	W	W	L	L	W	L	W	D	W	W	W	L	W	W	W	L	W	W	D
Position	12	12	13	12	8	10	6	9	8	9	9	9	8	9	10	9	10	9	9	9	8	6	8	6	5	4	5	4	4	4

Updated to match(es) played on 16 May 2021. Source: Premier Liga
A = Away; H = Home; W = Win; D = Draw; L = Loss

==== Results ====
11 August 2020 1	Rubin Kazan	0 – 2	Lokomotiv Moscow	Kazan
20:00 MSK (UTC+3)	Ignatyev (yellow card) 50'; Begić (red card) 65'; Uremović (yellow card) 65'; Makarov (yellow card) 85'	Report	Al.Miranchuk 2'; Barinov 26' (yellow card) 78'; Rybchinsky (yellow card) 48'; Zhivoglyadov (yellow card) 59'; Magkeyev (yellow card) 88'; Iosifov (yellow card) 90+2'	Stadium: Ak Bars Arena; Attendance: 4,477; Referee: Sergey Ivanov

15 August 2020 2	Rubin Kazan	1 – 1	Ural Yekaterinburg	Kazan
15:30 MSK (UTC+3)	Merkulov (yellow card) 21' (yellow-red card) 31'; Ignatyev 35' (pen.)	Report	Bicfalvi 12' (pen.); Yemelyanov (yellow card) 33' (yellow-red card) 63'; Aratore (yellow card) 45'; Kulakov (yellow card) 48'; Rykov (yellow card) 51'; Hodzyur (yellow card) 88'; Miškić (yellow card) 90'	Stadium: Ak Bars Arena; Attendance: 4,088; Referee: Alexey Sukhoi

18 August 2020 3	Sochi	3 – 2	Rubin Kazan	Sochi
18:00 MSK (UTC+3)	Mevlja 44'; Noboa 86'; Miladinović 90+1'; Bakhtiyarov (yellow card) 90+3'; Mammana (yellow card) 90+4'	Report	Begić (yellow card) 12'; Samoshnikov (yellow card) 42'; Ignatyev 68' (pen.); Makarov 77'; Uremović (yellow card) 90'	Stadium: Fisht Olympic Stadium; Attendance: 4,271; Referee: Vladislav Bezborodov

22 August 2020 4	CSKA Moscow	1 – 2	Rubin Kazan	Moscow
20:00 MSK (UTC+3)	Vlašić (yellow card) 9' (goal) 39'; Sigurðsson (yellow card) 17'	Report	Zuyev (yellow card) 32'; Bakayev 37'; Uremović (yellow card) 51'; Shatov (yellow card) 75'; Kvaratskhelia (yellow card) 79'; Makarov 90+'	Stadium: VEB Arena; Attendance: 7,731; Referee: Kirill Levnikov

26 August 2020 5	Rubin Kazan	3 – 0	Ufa	Kazan
18:30 MSK (UTC+3)	Hwang 47'; Makarov 55', 69'; Despotović (yellow card) 65'	Report	Sukhov (yellow card) 36'; Bizjak (yellow card) 36'; Thill (yellow card) 54'; Alikin (yellow card) 72'; Bezdenezhnykh (yellow card) 86'	Stadium: Ak Bars Arena; Attendance: 6,276; Referee: Pavel Kukuyan

30 August 2020 6	Rubin Kazan	2 – 2	Tambov	Kazan
18:00 MSK (UTC+3)	Hwang (yellow card) 30'; Despotović 45+', 90'; Uremović (yellow card) 71'; Abildgaard (yellow card) 88'	Report	Karapetian 15'; Rybin (yellow card) 51'; Karasyov 85'	Stadium: Ak Bars Arena; Attendance: 4,515; Referee: Vitali Meshkov

13 September 2020 7	Dynamo Moscow	0 – 1	Rubin Kazan	Moscow
16:30 MSK (UTC+3)	Ordets (yellow card) 2'; Parshivlyuk (yellow card) 35' (yellow-red card) 90+'; Komlichenko (yellow card) 47' (yellow-red card) 51'; Philipp (yellow card) 54'	Report	Despotović 31' (pen.); Hwang (yellow card) 31' (yellow-red card) 90+'; Makarov (yellow card) 67'; Merkulov (yellow card) 90'	Stadium: VTB Arena; Attendance: 5,723; Referee: Sergey Lapochkin

20 September 2020 8	Rubin Kazan	0 – 2	Spartak Moscow	Kazan
16:30 MSK (UTC+3)	Kvaratskhelia (yellow card) 24'; Abildgaard (yellow card) 29'; Merkulov (yellow card) 47'; Uremović (yellow card) 90'; Makarov (yellow card) 90+'; Jevtić (yellow card) 90+'	Report	Larsson 5'; Merkulov 21' (o.g.); Maslov (yellow card) 39' (yellow-red card) 61'; Maksimenko (yellow card) 61'; Urunov (yellow card) 81'	Stadium: Ak Bars Arena; Attendance: 18,465; Referee: Kirill Levnikov

27 September 2020 9	Rotor Volgograd	1 – 3	Rubin Kazan	Volgograd
19:00 MSK (UTC+3)	Manucharyan (yellow card) 23' (yellow-red card) 48'; Kvirkvelia (yellow card) 30'; Nikolayev (yellow card) 40'; Flamarion 61'	Report	Starfelt (yellow card) 20'; Despotović 42'; Zuyev (yellow card) 52'; Kvaratskhelia 59'; Shatov 75' (pen.); Abildgaard (yellow card) 89'	Stadium: Volgograd Arena; Attendance: 8,950; Referee: Vladislav Bezborodov

4 October 2020 10	Rubin Kazan	1 – 1	Akhmat Grozny	Kazan
16:30 MSK (UTC+3)	Kvaratskhelia 53'; Samoshnikov (yellow card) 61'; Jevtić (yellow card) 64' (yellow-red card) 68'; Bystrov (yellow card) 75'	Report	Nenakhov (yellow card) 9'; Melkadze (yellow card) 47'; Melkadze 80' (pen.); Timofeyev (yellow card) 89'	Stadium: Ak Bars Arena; Attendance: 6,387; Referee: Vladimir Moskalyov

17 October 2020 11	Krasnodar	3 – 1	Rubin Kazan	Krasnodar
18:30 MSK (UTC+3)	Cabella 45+' (pen.); Olsson 52'; Smolnikov (yellow card) 56'; Berg 90+'; Kaio (yellow card) 90+'	Report	Despotović (yellow card) 45+'; Abildgaard (yellow card) 55'; Shatov (yellow card) 87'; Makarov (yellow card) 90'; Starfelt 90+'	Stadium: Krasnodar Stadium; Attendance: 10,554; Referee: Mikhail Vilkov

24 October 2020 12	Zenit St.Petersburg	1 – 2	Rubin Kazan	Saint Petersburg
16:30 MSK (UTC+3)	Yerokhin 26'; Kuzyayev (yellow card) 87'; Rakitskiy (yellow card) 90+'	Report	Uremović (yellow card) 25'; Despotović 43'; Jevtić 69'	Stadium: Krestovsky Stadium; Attendance: 20,847; Referee: Nikolay Voloshin

31 October 2020 13	Rubin Kazan	3 – 1	Arsenal Tula	Kazan
14:00 MSK (UTC+3)	Starfelt 20'; Despotović 22'; Bakayev 53'; Samoshnikov (yellow card) 63'; Kosarev (yellow card) 90+'	Report	E.Kangwa (yellow card) 55'; Panchenko 83'; Belyayev (yellow card) 85'	Stadium: Ak Bars Arena; Attendance: 3,899; Referee: Vasily Kazartsev

8 November 2020 14	Khimki	2 – 0	Rubin Kazan	Khimki
14:00 MSK (UTC+3)	Filin (yellow card) 40'; Konaté (yellow card) 42'; Mirzov 48'; Troshechkin (yellow card) 56'; Glushakov 69'; Lantratov (yellow card) 90'	Report	Begić (yellow card) 27'; Kvaratskhelia (yellow card) 50'; Uremović (yellow card) 67'	Stadium: Arena Khimki; Referee: Sergey Lapochkin

22 November 2020 15	Rubin Kazan	0 – 2	Rostov	Kazan
19:00 MSK (UTC+3)	Bakayev (yellow card) 34'; Makarov (yellow card) 70'	Report	Aleesami (yellow card) 15'; Normann (yellow card) 31'; Bayramyan 55', 76'	Stadium: Ak Bars Arena; Attendance: 3,011; Referee: Pavel Kukuyan

29 November 2020 16	Rubin Kazan	1 – 0	CSKA Moscow	Kazan
16:30 MSK (UTC+3)	Makarov (yellow card) 13'; Jevtić (yellow card) 48'; Zotov (yellow card) 50'; Despotović 59' (yellow card) 59'; Samoshnikov (yellow card) 62'; Shatov (yellow card) 90+'; Klimov (yellow card) 90+'; Merkulov (yellow card) 90+'	Report	Diveyev (yellow card) 80'; Maradishvili (yellow card) 85'	Stadium: Ak Bars Arena; Attendance: 7,671; Referee: Vitali Meshkov

5 December 2020 17	Lokomotiv Moscow	3 – 1	Rubin Kazan	Moscow
14:00 MSK (UTC+3)	Mukhin (yellow card) 5'; Ignatyev 17', 86'; Krychowiak (yellow card) 36'; An.Miranchuk 69' (pen.); Murilo (yellow card) 74'; Lisakovich (yellow card) 80'	Report	Hwang 3'; Ignatyev (yellow card) 23' (yellow-red card) 47'; Zuyev (yellow card) 26'; Zotov (yellow card) 29'; Medvedev (yellow card) 69'	Stadium: RZD Arena; Attendance: 3,768; Referee: Sergei Karasev

13 December 2020 18	Tambov	0 – 1	Rubin Kazan	Saransk
14:00 MSK (UTC+3)	Valadzko (yellow card) 45'; Haroyan (yellow card) 56'	Report	Kvaratskhelia (yellow card) 13'; Samoshnikov 20'; Despotović (yellow card) 56'	Stadium: Mordovia Arena; Referee: Kirill Levnikov
Note: Match played at the Mordovia Arena in Saransk instead of Tambov's regular Spartak Stadium.

17 December 2020 19	Akhmat Grozny	0 – 0	Rubin Kazan	Grozny
20:00 MSK (UTC+3)	Putsko (yellow card) 27'	Report	Jevtić (yellow card) 22'; Hwang (yellow card) 68'; Abildgaard (yellow card) 90+3'	Stadium: Akhmat-Arena; Referee: Stanislav Vasiliev

28 February 2021 20	Spartak Moscow	0 – 2	Rubin Kazan	Moscow
14:00 MSK (UTC+3)	Gigot (yellow card) 12'; Moses (yellow card) 20'; Zobnin (yellow card) 37' (yellow-red card) 45+3'; Sobolev (yellow card) 75'; Dzhikiya (yellow card) 87'	Report	Shatov (yellow card) 7'; Begić (yellow card) 26'; Despotović 53', 89'; Abildgaard (yellow card) 62' (yellow-red card) 71'	Stadium: Otkritie Arena; Attendance: 9,834; Referee: Sergey Lapochkin

8 March 2021 21	Rubin Kazan	2 – 1	Zenit St.Petersburg	Kazan
16:30 MSK (UTC+3)	Despotović 41' (pen.); Zuyev (yellow card) 83'; Makarov 90+'	Report	Azmoun 75'; Lovren (yellow card) 77'; Dzyuba (penalty missed) 90+'	Stadium: Ak Bars Arena; Attendance: 9,211; Referee: Sergei Karasev

14 March 2021 22	Ufa	0 – 3	Rubin Kazan	Ufa
14:00 MSK (UTC+3)	Kamilov (yellow card) 20'; Golubev (yellow card) 33'; Ivanov (yellow card) 80'	Report	Abildgaard (yellow card) 29'; Makarov 30'; Kvaratskhelia 42'; Samoshnikov 74'	Stadium: Neftyanik Stadium; Attendance: 3,196; Referee: Igor Panin

19 March 2021 23	Rubin Kazan	1 – 3	Khimki	Kazan
19:00 MSK (UTC+3)	Despotović (yellow card) 19' (goal) 42'; Zotov (yellow card) 45+'; Kvaratskhelia (yellow card) 53'; Bakayev (yellow card) 90+'	Report	Mirzov 20' (pen.); Mogilevets 28' (yellow card) 65'; Dagerstål (yellow card) 64'; Kukharchuk 75'; Tikhiy (yellow card) 80'	Stadium: Ak Bars Arena; Attendance: 5,937; Referee: Aleksei Matyunin

3 April 2021 24	Rubin Kazan	1 – 0	Sochi	Kazan
16:30 MSK (UTC+3)	Zotov (yellow card) 38'; Samoshnikov (yellow card) 45'; Kvaratskhelia 72' (yellow card) 90+'; Zuyev (yellow card) 84'	Report	Noboa (yellow card) 3'; Tsallagov (yellow card) 33'; A.Zabolotny (yellow card) 57'; Miladinović (yellow card) 90+'	Stadium: Ak Bars Arena; Attendance: 6,511; Referee: Vladislav Bezborodov

10 April 2021 25	Rostov	0 – 1	Rubin Kazan	Rostov-on-Don
19:00 MSK (UTC+3)	Poyarkov (yellow card) 52'; Gigović (yellow card) 60'	Report	Despotović (yellow card) 31'; Zuyev (yellow card) 45+'; Jevtić 73'; Dyupin (yellow card) 90+'	Stadium: Rostov Arena; Attendance: 15,011; Referee: Stanislav Vasiliev

18 April 2021 26	Ural Yekaterinburg	0 – 1	Rubin Kazan	Yekaterinburg
12:00 MSK (UTC+3)	Yegorychev (yellow card) 25'; Gadzhimuradov (yellow card) 53'; Panyukov (penalty missed) 83'	Report	Zuyev (yellow card) 21'; Makarov (yellow card) 34' (yellow-red card) 83'; Jevtić 45'; Bakayev (yellow card) 56'; Abildgaard (yellow card) 64'; Samoshnikov (yellow card) 68'; Dyupin (yellow card) 90+'	Stadium: Central Stadium; Attendance: 10,739; Referee: Artyom Lyubimov

25 April 2021 27	Rubin Kazan	0 – 1	Krasnodar	Kazan
19:00 MSK (UTC+3)	Uremović (yellow card) 52'	Report	Smolnikov (yellow card) 6'; Ionov 17'; Gazinsky (yellow card) 29'	Stadium: Ak Bars Arena; Attendance: 9,108; Referee: Vasily Kazartsev

1 May 2021 28	Rubin Kazan	2 – 0	Dynamo Moscow	Kazan
14:00 MSK (UTC+3)	Despotović 15'; Hwang (yellow card) 42' (goal) 80'; Samoshnikov (red card) 52'; Makarov (yellow card) 70'	Report	Szymański (yellow card) 9'; Skopintsev (yellow card) 35'; Fomin (yellow card) 89'	Stadium: Ak Bars Arena; Attendance: 9,063; Referee: Vitali Meshkov

8 May 2021 29	Arsenal Tula	2 – 4	Rubin Kazan	Tula
16:30 MSK (UTC+3)	Khlusevich 25' (yellow card) 82'; Tkachyov (yellow card) 28' (yellow-red card) 52'; Đorđević 32' (yellow card) 62'; Grigalava (yellow card) 90+'	Report	Despotović 52' (pen.); Bakayev (yellow card) 54'; Makarov 59'; Zuyev (yellow card) 63'; Starfelt 66'; Zotov (yellow card) 79'; Kostyukov 89'	Stadium: Arsenal Stadium; Attendance: 6,103; Referee: Kirill Levnikov

16 May 2021 30	Rubin Kazan	1 – 1	Rotor Volgograd	Kazan
14:00 MSK (UTC+3)	D.Makarov (yellow card) 20'; Abildgaard (yellow card) 27'; Zotov (yellow card) 31'; Despotović 90+'; Bakayev (yellow card) 90+'	Report	Aleynik (yellow card) 28'; Stepanov (yellow card) 51'; Gogoua (yellow card) 66'; Flamarion 78' (pen.); Zhigulyov (yellow card) 88'; S.Makarov (yellow card) 90+'	Stadium: Ak Bars Arena; Attendance: 12,433; Referee: Vitali Meshkov

=== Russian Cup ===
==== Round of 32 ====
Pos	Team	Pld	W	D	L	GF	GA	GD	Pts	Qualification
1	SKA-Khabarovsk (Q)	2	2	0	0	4	1	+3	6	Advance to Play-off
2	Rubin Kazan	2	1	0	1	4	3	+1	3	
3	Chernomorets Novorossiysk	2	0	0	2	3	7	−4	0	

(Q) Qualified for the phase indicated

16 September 2020 1	Chernomorets Novorossiysk	2 – 4	Rubin Kazan	Novorossiysk
19:00 MSK (UTC+3)	M.Omarov 7' (yellow card) 84'; I.Matyushenko 69'	Report	Samoshnikov (yellow card) 16'; Begić 25'; Hwang 52'; Makarov 62', 89'	Stadium: Central Stadium; Referee: Alexander Mashlyakevich

4 November 2020 2	SKA-Khabarovsk	1 – 0	Rubin Kazan	Khabarovsk
10:00 MSK (UTC+3)	Bragin (yellow card) 22'; Martusevich (yellow card) 43'; Gadzhimuradov 75'; Trufanov (yellow card) 78' (yellow-red card) 80'; Nikiforov (yellow card) 90+'	Report	Samoshnikov (yellow card) 15'; Abildgaard (yellow card) 78'; Starfelt (yellow card) 79'; Tarasov (yellow card) 90+'	Stadium: Lenin Stadium; Attendance: 949; Referee: Pavel Shadykhanov

== Squad statistics ==
As of match played 16 May 2021

=== Appearances and goals ===
No.	Pos	Nat	Player	Total		Premier League		Russian Cup	
No.	Pos	Nat	Player	Apps	Goals	Apps	Goals	Apps	Goals
1	GK	(Russia) RUS	Nikita Medvedev	5	0	4	0	1	0
2	DF	(Sweden) SWE	Carl Starfelt	30	3	28	3	2	0
3	DF	(Russia) RUS	Mikhail Merkulov	10	0	9+1	0	0	0
4	DF	(Croatia) CRO	Silvije Begić	20	1	15+3	0	2	1
5	DF	(Croatia) CRO	Filip Uremović	24	0	22+2	0	0	0
6	MF	(South Korea) KOR	Hwang In-beom	20	4	13+5	3	2	1
8	MF	(Switzerland) SUI	Darko Jevtić	27	3	22+3	3	2	0
9	FW	(Serbia) SRB	Đorđe Despotović	26	14	21+5	14	0	0
12	MF	(Russia) RUS	Aleksandr Zuyev	25	0	13+10	0	1+1	0
14	MF	(Russia) RUS	Mikhail Kostyukov	8	1	3+5	1	0	0
19	FW	(Russia) RUS	Ivan Ignatyev	19	2	8+9	2	2	0
20	MF	(Russia) RUS	Oleg Shatov	21	1	17+4	1	0	0
21	MF	(Georgia (country)) GEO	Khvicha Kvaratskhelia	23	4	20+3	4	0	0
22	GK	(Russia) RUS	Yury Dyupin	27	0	26	0	1	0
25	MF	(Russia) RUS	Denis Makarov	30	9	20+8	7	1+1	2
28	MF	(Denmark) DEN	Oliver Abildgaard	29	0	28	0	1	0
31	DF	(Russia) RUS	Georgi Zotov	19	0	15+2	0	1+1	0
38	MF	(Russia) RUS	Leon Musayev	10	0	5+5	0	0	0
77	DF	(Russia) RUS	Ilya Samoshnikov	26	2	21+3	2	2	0
87	MF	(Russia) RUS	Soltmurad Bakayev	30	2	16+12	2	2	0
Players away from the club on loan:
10	MF	(Russia) RUS	Igor Konovalov	7	0	2+4	0	1	0
11	MF	(Georgia (country)) GEO	Zuriko Davitashvili	2	0	1+1	0	0	0
13	FW	(Russia) RUS	Kirill Klimov	4	0	0+4	0	0	0
47	FW	(Russia) RUS	Kirill Kosarev	4	0	0+3	0	0+1	0
Players who left Rubin Kazan during the season:
15	MF	(Russia) RUS	Dmitri Tarasov	9	0	1+6	0	1+1	0
18	MF	(Russia) RUS	Pavel Mogilevets	1	0	0+1	0	0	0

=== Goal scorers ===
Place	Position	Nation	Number	Name	Premier League	Russian Cup	Total
1	FW	(Serbia)	9	Đorđe Despotović	14	0	14
2	MF	(Russia)	25	Denis Makarov	7	2	9
3	MF	(Georgia (country))	21	Khvicha Kvaratskhelia	4	0	4
3	MF	(South Korea)	6	Hwang In-beom	3	1	4
5	MF	(Switzerland)	8	Darko Jevtić	3	0	3
5	DF	(Sweden)	2	Carl Starfelt	3	0	3
7	FW	(Russia)	19	Ivan Ignatyev	2	0	2
7	MF	(Russia)	87	Soltmurad Bakayev	2	0	2
7	DF	(Russia)	77	Ilya Samoshnikov	2	0	2
10	MF	(Russia)	20	Oleg Shatov	1	0	1
10	DF	(Russia)	14	Mikhail Kostyukov	1	0	1
10	DF	(Croatia)	4	Silvije Begić	0	1	1
				TOTALS	42	4	46

=== Clean sheets ===
Place	Position	Nation	Number	Name	Premier League	Russian Cup	Total
1	GK	(Russia)	22	Yury Dyupin	9	0	9
2	GK	(Russia)	1	Nikita Medvedev	2	0	2
				TOTALS	11	0	11

=== Disciplinary record ===
Number	Nation	Position	Name	Premier League		Russian Cup		Total	
Number	Nation	Position	Name	Booked	Sent off (straight red)	Booked	Sent off (straight red)	Booked	Sent off (straight red)
1	(Russia)	GK	Nikita Medvedev	1	0	0	0	1	0
2	(Sweden)	DF	Carl Starfelt	1	0	1	0	2	0
3	(Russia)	DF	Mikhail Merkulov	4	1	0	0	4	1
4	(Croatia)	DF	Silvije Begić	4	1	0	0	4	1
5	(Croatia)	DF	Filip Uremović	8	0	0	0	8	0
6	(South Korea)	MF	Hwang In-beom	5	1	0	0	5	1
8	(Switzerland)	MF	Darko Jevtić	5	1	0	0	5	1
9	(Serbia)	FW	Đorđe Despotović	6	0	0	0	6	0
12	(Russia)	MF	Aleksandr Zuyev	7	0	0	0	7	0
19	(Russia)	FW	Ivan Ignatyev	3	1	0	0	3	1
20	(Russia)	MF	Oleg Shatov	4	0	0	0	4	0
21	(Georgia (country))	MF	Khvicha Kvaratskhelia	6	0	0	0	6	0
22	(Russia)	GK	Yury Dyupin	2	0	0	0	2	0
25	(Russia)	MF	Denis Makarov	10	1	0	0	10	1
28	(Denmark)	MF	Oliver Abildgaard	10	1	1	0	11	1
31	(Russia)	DF	Georgi Zotov	7	0	0	0	7	0
77	(Russia)	DF	Ilya Samoshnikov	6	1	2	0	8	1
87	(Russia)	MF	Soltmurad Bakayev	5	0	0	0	5	0
Players away on loan:
13	(Russia)	FW	Kirill Klimov	1	0	0	0	1	0
47	(Russia)	FW	Kirill Kosarev	1	0	0	0	1	0
Players who left Rubin Kazan during the season:
15	(Russia)	MF	Dmitri Tarasov	0	0	1	0	1	0
			TOTALS	96	8	5	0	101	8
