= Nikita Medvedev =

Russian footballer (born 1994)

- Medvedev with Rostov in 2022

Personal information
- Full name: Nikita Olegovich Medvedev
- Date of birth: 17 December 1994 (age 31)
- Place of birth: Izhevsk, Russia
- Height: 1.92 m (6 ft 4 in)
- Position: Goalkeeper

Team information
- Current team: Nizhny Novgorod
- Number: 30

Senior career*
| Years | Team | Apps | (Gls) |
| 2013–2015 | Zenit-Izhevsk | 44 | (0) |
| 2016–2017 | Rostov | 17 | (0) |
| 2017–2020 | Lokomotiv Moscow | 0 | (0) |
| 2020–2022 | Rubin Kazan | 6 | (0) |
| 2022–2024 | Rostov | 8 | (0) |
| 2024– | Nizhny Novgorod | 57 | (0) |
- * Club domestic league appearances and goals as of 17 May 2026

Nikita Olegovich Medvedev (Russian: Ники́та Оле́гович Медве́дев; born 17 December 1994) is a Russian football player who plays as a goalkeeper for Nizhny Novgorod.

== Career ==
Medvedev made his professional debut in the Russian Professional Football League for Zenit-Izhevsk on 29 September 2013 in a game against Oktan Perm.

He made his Russian Premier League debut for Rostov on 9 September 2016 against Krylia Sovetov Samara.

Following Soslan Dzhanayev's injury, Medvedev became the first-choice Rostov goalkeeper during the 2016–17 season, including the Champions League 3–2 victory over Bayern and Europa League matchup against Manchester United. He kept the clean sheet for Rostov for 952 minutes in the national league as of 25 April 2017 and has beaten the all-time Russian league record of 939 minutes set by Ruslan Nigmatullin. He left Rostov on 9 June 2017.

On 14 June 2017, he signed a 5-year contract with Lokomotiv Moscow. In the first half of the 2017–18 season he was at first the backup to Guilherme and played two games, one in the Russian Cup and one in the Europa League. When Guilherme was injured, Lokomotiv manager decided to start Anton Kochenkov instead for the next several games, moving Medvedev to third-choice goalkeeper on the squad. His contract was terminated on 14 August 2020 after 3 seasons with the club in which he made no league appearances.

On 17 August 2020, he signed a two-year contract with Rubin Kazan On 1 June 2022, Medveded signed a new three-year contract with Rubin..

On 21 July 2022, Medvedev returned to Rostov on a contract for two seasons, with an option for a third.

On 23 June 2024, Medvedev signed a three-year contract with Nizhny Novgorod.

On 26 April 2025, Medvedev saved a penalty kick by Nader Ghandri deep in added time to preserve a 1–0 victory for Pari Nizhny Novgorod in a relegation battle match up against Akhmat Grozny. After the penalty kick was retaken because Medvedev left the goal line before the Ghandri kick, he saved the second attempt as well which was taken by Maksim Samorodov.

== Career statistics ==
=== Club ===
As of match played 17 May 2026

Appearances and goals by club, season and competition
| Club | Season | League | | | Cup | | Europe | | Other | | Total | |
| Club | Season | Division | Apps | Goals | Apps | Goals | Apps | Goals | Apps | Goals | Apps | Goals |
|---|---|---|---|---|---|---|---|---|---|---|---|---|
| Zenit-Izhevsk | 2012–13 | Russian Football National League 2 | 0 | 0 | 0 | 0 | – | | – | | 0 | 0 |
| Zenit-Izhevsk | 2013–14 | Russian Football National League 2 | 15 | 0 | 0 | 0 | – | | – | | 15 | 0 |
| Zenit-Izhevsk | 2014–15 | Russian Football National League 2 | 25 | 0 | 1 | 0 | – | | – | | 26 | 0 |
| Zenit-Izhevsk | 2015–16 | Russian Football National League 2 | 4 | 0 | 4 | 0 | – | | – | | 8 | 0 |
| Zenit-Izhevsk | Total | | 44 | 0 | 5 | 0 | 0 | 0 | 0 | 0 | 49 | 0 |
| Rostov | 2015–16 | Russian Premier League | 0 | 0 | – | | – | | – | | 0 | 0 |
| Rostov | 2016–17 | Russian Premier League | 17 | 0 | 1 | 0 | 4 (Note: Appearances in the UEFA Europa League) | 0 | – | | 22 | 0 |
| Rostov | Total | | 17 | 0 | 1 | 0 | 4 | 0 | 0 | 0 | 22 | 0 |
| Lokomotiv Moscow | 2017–18 | Russian Premier League | 0 | 0 | 1 | 0 | 1 | 0 | – | | 2 | 0 |
| Lokomotiv Moscow | 2018–19 | Russian Premier League | 0 | 0 | 0 | 0 | 0 | 0 | – | | 0 | 0 |
| Lokomotiv Moscow | 2019–20 | Russian Premier League | 0 | 0 | 0 | 0 | 0 | 0 | – | | 0 | 0 |
| Lokomotiv Moscow | Total | | 0 | 0 | 1 | 0 | 1 | 0 | 0 | 0 | 2 | 0 |
| Rubin Kazan | 2020–21 | Russian Premier League | 4 | 0 | 1 | 0 | – | | – | | 5 | 0 |
| Rubin Kazan | 2021–22 | Russian Premier League | 1 | 0 | 0 | 0 | 1 (Note: Appearance in the UEFA Europa Conference League) | 0 | – | | 2 | 0 |
| Rubin Kazan | 2022–23 | Russian First League | 1 | 0 | – | | – | | – | | 1 | 0 |
| Rubin Kazan | Total | | 6 | 0 | 1 | 0 | 1 | 0 | 0 | 0 | 8 | 0 |
| Rostov | 2022–23 | Russian Premier League | 0 | 0 | 2 | 0 | – | | – | | 2 | 0 |
| Rostov | 2023–24 | Russian Premier League | 8 | 0 | 9 | 0 | – | | – | | 17 | 0 |
| Rostov | Total | | 8 | 0 | 11 | 0 | – | | – | | 19 | 0 |
| Pari Nizhny Novgorod | 2024–25 | Russian Premier League | 28 | 0 | 0 | 0 | – | | 2 (Note: Appearances in the relegation play-offs) | 0 | 30 | 0 |
| Pari Nizhny Novgorod | 2025–26 | Russian Premier League | 29 | 0 | 2 | 0 | – | | – | | 31 | 0 |
| Pari Nizhny Novgorod | Total | | 57 | 0 | 2 | 0 | – | | 2 | 0 | 61 | 0 |
| Career total | | | 132 | 0 | 21 | 0 | 6 | 0 | 2 | 0 | 161 | 0 |

== Honours ==
=== Club ===
Lokomotiv Moscow

- Russian Premier League (1): 2017–18

Rubin Kazan

- Russian First League (1): 2022–23
