= FC Metallurg Vidnoye =

Russian football team based in Moscow

- Full name: Football Club Metallurg Vidnoye
- Founded: 2020
- Ground: Metallurg
- Capacity: 1000
- Chairman: Aleksei Filatov
- League: Amateur
- 2021–22: FNL 2, Group 3, 21st
- Website: https://fc-mv.ru/
Home colours	Away colours

FC Metallurg Vidnoye (Russian: ФК «Металлург» Видное) is a Russian football team based in Vidnoye, Moscow Oblast. It was founded in 2020. For 2020–21 season, it received the license for the third-tier Russian Professional Football League. The club did not receive a professional license for the 2022–23 season.
