= Aleksandr Zuyev (footballer) =

Kazakhstani footballer (born 1996)

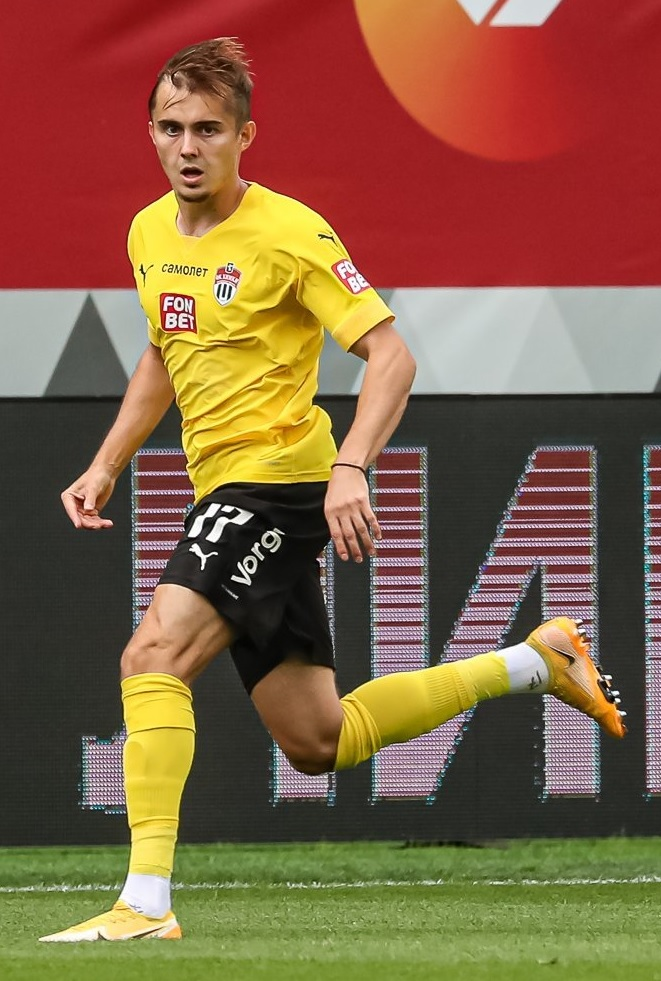
- Zuyev with Khimki in 2022

Personal information
- Full name: Aleksandr Dmitriyevich Zuyev
- Date of birth: 26 June 1996 (age 30)
- Place of birth: Kostanay, Kazakhstan
- Height: 1.77 m (5 ft 10 in)
- Position: Left winger

Team information
- Current team: Tobol
- Number: 17

Youth career
- 2003–2005: Tobol
- –2010: Akademiya Futbola Chelyabinsk
- 2010–2013: Chertanovo Education Center
- 2013–2016: Spartak Moscow

Senior career*
Years	Team	Apps	(Gls)
2014–2016	Spartak-2 Moscow	59	(12)
2014–2018	Spartak Moscow	22	(0)
2017	→ Krylia Sovetov Samara (loan)	11	(0)
2017–2018	→ Rostov (loan)	25	(1)
2018–2020	Rostov	29	(2)
2019–2020	→ Rubin Kazan (loan)	17	(0)
2020–2022	Rubin Kazan	40	(0)
2022	Khimki	14	(0)
2023	Krylia Sovetov Samara	10	(0)
2023	IMT	13	(0)
2024	Arsenal Tula	9	(0)
2024–	Tobol	62	(9)

International career^{‡}
2011–2012	Russia U16	15	(4)
2012–2013	Russia U17	21	(3)
2014	Russia U18	9	(4)
2014–2015	Russia U19	10	(1)
2016–2018	Russia U21	14	(4)
2023–	Kazakhstan	4	(0)
- * Club domestic league appearances and goals as of 1 November 2026 ‡ National team caps and goals as of 9 June 2025

Aleksandr Dmitriyevich Zuyev (Russian: Александр Дмитриевич Зуев; born 26 June 1996) is a Kazakh footballer who plays for Tobol and the Kazakhstan national team. Born in Kazakhstan, he moved to Russia at a young age and represented the country on junior levels before switching allegiance to Kazakhstan for senior level in 2023. For the most of his career he played as a left winger and in other attacking positions, and he was also deployed as a right-back.

== Career ==
=== Club ===
Zuyev made his professional debut in the Russian Professional Football League for Spartak-2 Moscow on 9 April 2014 in a game against FC Tambov, with his debut for Spartak Moscow coming on 23 September 2014 in a Russian Cup game against Smena Komsomolsk-na-Amure. Zuyev's Russian Premier League debut came on 19 October 2014 in a game against Ural Yekaterinburg.

On 17 February 2017, Zuyev joined Krylia Sovetov Samara on loan for the remainder of the 2016–17 season.

On 23 June 2017, he agreed on a season-long loan with Rostov.

On 27 May 2018, he moved to Rostov on a permanent basis, signing a 4-year contract. On 30 September 2018, he scored the only goal of the game 12 minutes after coming off the bench in the second half to help Rostov defeat his former club Spartak Moscow in an away game.

On 2 September 2019, he joined Rubin Kazan on loan for the 2019–20 season. On 10 August 2020, Rubin bought out his rights on a permanent basis.

On 14 July 2022, Zuyev signed a two-year contract with Khimki.

On 21 February 2023, Zuyev returned to Krylia Sovetov Samara until the end of the 2022–23 season. He left Krylia Sovetov at the end of the season.

On 14 September 2023, he signed with Serbian club IMT. He was the IMT last day reinforcement of the 2023 summer transfer window of the SuperLiga newly promoted club.

On 16 January 2024, Zuyev returned to Russia and signed with Arsenal Tula.

=== International ===
Zuyev won the 2013 UEFA European Under-17 Championship with Russia national under-17 football team, with which he also participated in the 2013 FIFA U-17 World Cup.

Later he represented Russia national under-19 football team at the 2015 UEFA European Under-19 Championship, where Russia came in second place.

In June 2023, Zuyev acquired citizenship of Kazakhstan, where he was born, and was called up to the Kazakhstan national football team. He could not join the team at the time due to an injury. He made his debut on 17 November 2023 in a Euro 2024 qualifier against San Marino.

== Career statistics ==
As of match played 21 May 2022

Club	Season	League			Cup		Continental		Total	
Club	Season	Division	Apps	Goals	Apps	Goals	Apps	Goals	Apps	Goals
Spartak-2 Moscow	2013–14	PFL	8	2	–		–		8	2
Spartak-2 Moscow	2014–15	PFL	25	4	–		–		25	4
Spartak-2 Moscow	2015–16	FNL	22	6	–		–		22	6
Spartak-2 Moscow	2016–17	FNL	4	0	–		–		4	0
Spartak-2 Moscow	Total		59	12	0	0	0	0	59	12
Spartak Moscow	2014–15	RPL	2	0	0	0	–		2	0
Spartak Moscow	2015–16	RPL	14	0	2	0	–		16	0
Spartak Moscow	2016–17	RPL	6	0	1	0	1 (Note: Appearance in the UEFA Europa League)	0	8	0
Spartak Moscow	Total		22	0	3	0	1	0	26	0
Krylia Sovetov Samara	2016–17	RPL	11	0	–		–		11	0
Rostov	2017–18	RPL	25	1	2	1	–		27	2
Rostov	2018–19	RPL	22	1	4	0	–		26	1
Rostov	2019–20	RPL	7	1	–		–		7	1
Rostov	Total		54	3	6	1	0	0	60	4
Rubin Kazan	2019–20	RPL	17	0	1	0	–		18	0
Rubin Kazan	2020–21	RPL	23	0	2	0	–		25	0
Rubin Kazan	2021–22	RPL	17	0	2	0	1 (Note: Appearance in the UEFA Europa Conference League)	0	20	0
Rubin Kazan	Total		57	0	5	0	1	0	63	0
Khimki	2022–23	RPL	14	0	2	0	–		16	0
Career total			217	15	16	1	2	0	235	16
