= Aleksei Gorodovoy =

Russian footballer (born 1993)

Aleksei Gorodovoy Алексей Городовой
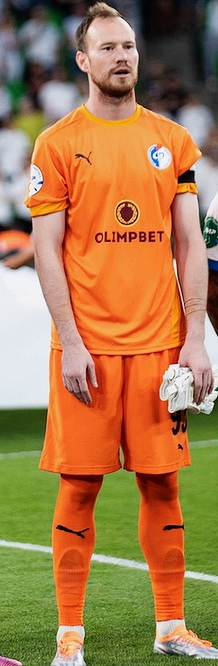
- Gorodovoy with FC Fakel Voronezh in 2022

Personal information
- Full name: Aleksei Vladimirovich Gorodovoy
- Date of birth: 10 August 1993 (age 33)
- Place of birth: Stavropol, Russia
- Height: 1.91 m (6 ft 3 in)
- Position: Goalkeeper

Team information
- Current team: Kongsvinger IL
- Number: 93

Youth career
- 2003–2009: FC Dynamo Stavropol
- 2010: FC Rostov

Senior career*
Years	Team	Apps	(Gls)
2011–2012	FC Dynamo Stavropol	6	(0)
2012–2013	FC Sakhalin Yuzhno-Sakhalinsk	1	(0)
2013–2014	FC Yakutiya Yakutsk	12	(0)
2014–2016	PFC Spartak Nalchik	22	(0)
2017–2018	Kongsvinger IL	27	(0)
2019–2021	FC Rubin Kazan	0	(0)
2019	→ FC Zenit-2 Saint Petersburg (loan)	7	(0)
2020	→ FC Veles Moscow (loan)	16	(0)
2021	→ FC SKA-Khabarovsk (loan)	14	(0)
2022–2023	FC Fakel Voronezh	19	(0)
2023–2024	FC Rodina Moscow	9	(0)
2025–	Kongsvinger IL	60	(0)
- * Club domestic league appearances and goals as of 14 November 2026

Aleksei Vladimirovich Gorodovoy (Russian: Алексей Владимирович Городовой; born 10 August 1993) is a Russian footballer who plays as a goalkeeper. He plays for Kongsvinger IL.

== Club career ==
He made his debut in the Russian Second Division for FC Dynamo Stavropol on 18 April 2012 in a game against FC Biolog-Novokubansk Progress.

On 31 January 2019, he joined Russian Premier League club FC Rubin Kazan. For the rest of the 2018–29 season he was loaned to FC Zenit Saint Petersburg. He made his Russian Football National League debut for FC Zenit-2 Saint Petersburg on 3 March 2019 in a game against FC Shinnik Yaroslavl. On 17 June 2020 he joined FC Veles Moscow on loan for the 2020–21 season. On 25 January 2021, the loan was terminated. On 27 January 2021, he joined FC SKA-Khabarovsk on loan.

On 7 December 2021, he signed with FC Fakel Voronezh. Gorodovoy made his Russian Premier League debut for Fakel on 17 July 2022 against FC Krasnodar. On 20 June 2023, Fakel announced Gorodovoy's departure from the club due to the expiration of his contract.

== Career statistics ==
As of 14 November 2026

Club	Season	League			Cup		Continental		Total	
Club	Season	Division	Apps	Goals	Apps	Goals	Apps	Goals	Apps	Goals
Dynamo Stavropol	2011–12	Second League	6	0	0	0	–		6	0
Sakhalin	2012–13	Second League	1	0	–		–		1	0
Yakutiya Yakutsk	2013–14	Second League	12	0	0	0	–		12	0
Spartak Nalchik	2014–15	Second League	22	0	1	0	–		23	0
Spartak Nalchik	2015–16	Second League	0	0	0	0	–		0	0
Spartak Nalchik	Total		22	0	1	0	0	0	23	0
Kongsvinger	2017	1. divisjon	20	0	2	0	–		22	0
Kongsvinger	2018	1. divisjon	7	0	0	0	–		7	0
Kongsvinger	Total		27	0	2	0	0	0	29	0
Zenit-2 St. Petersburg (loan)	2018–19	First League	7	0	–		–		7	0
Rubin Kazan	2019–20	RPL	0	0	0	0	–		0	0
Rubin Kazan	2021–22	RPL	0	0	–		0	0	0	0
Rubin Kazan	Total		0	0	0	0	0	0	0	0
Veles Moscow (loan)	2020–21	First League	16	0	1	0	–		17	0
SKA-Khabarovsk (loan)	2020–21	First League	14	0	0	0	–		14	0
Fakel Voronezh	2021–22	First League	13	0	–		–		13	0
Fakel Voronezh	2022–23	RPL	6	0	5	0	–		11	0
Fakel Voronezh	Total		19	0	5	0	0	0	24	0
Rodina Moscow	2023–24	First League	9	0	1	0	–		10	0
Haugesund	2025	Norwegian First Division	31	0	3	0	–		34	0
Haugesund	2026	Norwegian First Division	30	0	3	0	–		33	0
Haugesund	Total		61	0	6	0	0	0	67	0
Career total			194	0	16	0	0	0	210	0
