= Mikhail Yakovlev (footballer, born 1999) =

Russian footballer

Personal information
- Full name: Mikhail Vadimovich Yakovlev
- Date of birth: 4 March 1999 (age 27)
- Place of birth: Lipetsk, Russia
- Height: 1.82 m (6 ft 0 in)
- Position: Midfielder

Team information
- Current team: Dynamo St. Petersburg
- Number: 20

Youth career
- –2013: Metallurg Lipetsk
- 2013–2016: Rubin Kazan

Senior career*
Years	Team	Apps	(Gls)
2016–2020	Rubin Kazan	0	(0)
2019–2020	→ KAMAZ Naberezhnye Chelny (loan)	13	(1)
2020–2021	Neftekhimik Nizhnekamsk	29	(1)
2021–2022	Metallurg Lipetsk	25	(1)
2022–2024	Arsenal Tula	34	(1)
2023–2024	Arsenal-2 Tula	2	(0)
2024	Shinnik Yaroslavl	3	(0)
2024	Sokol Kazan	13	(4)
2025–2026	Rubin-2 Kazan	25	(6)
2026	Kuban Krasnodar	15	(2)
2026–	Dynamo St. Petersburg	7	(1)

International career^{‡}
2014	Russia U-15	2	(0)
2014–2015	Russia U-16	11	(1)
2016	Russia U-17	8	(8)
2017	Russia U-18	6	(0)
2017–2018	Russia U-20	8	(2)
- * Club domestic league appearances and goals as of 1 November 2026 ‡ National team caps and goals as of 7 September 2018

Mikhail Vadimovich Yakovlev (Russian: Михаил Вадимович Яковлев; born 4 March 1999) is a Russian football player who plays for Dynamo St. Petersburg.

== Club career ==
He made his debut in the Russian Football National League for Neftekhimik Nizhnekamsk on 12 August 2020 in a game against Yenisey Krasnoyarsk.
