= Mikhail Merkulov =

Russian footballer

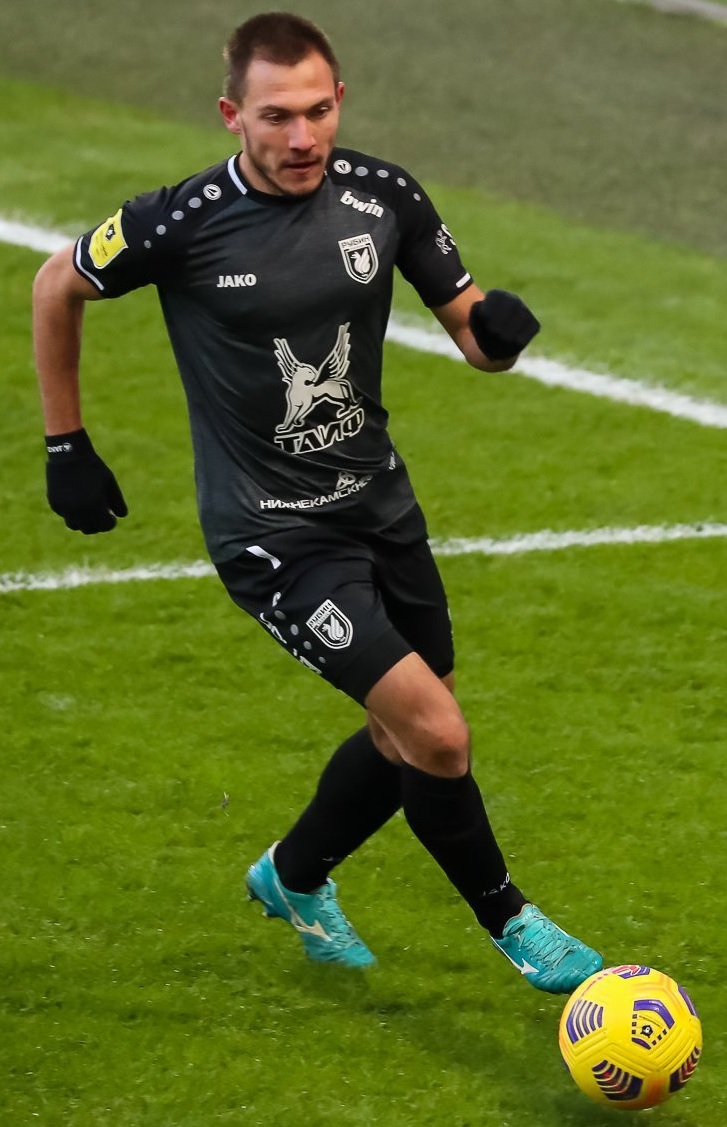
- Merkulov with Rubin Kazan in 2020

Personal information
- Full name: Mikhail Viktorovich Merkulov
- Date of birth: 26 January 1994 (age 32)
- Place of birth: Kamyshin, Russia
- Height: 1.80 m (5 ft 11 in)
- Position: Defender

Senior career*
| Years | Team | Apps | (Gls) |
| 2011–2015 | Rotor Volgograd | 9 | (0) |
| 2012 | → Energiya Volzhsky (loan) | 11 | (0) |
| 2015 | MITOS Novocherkassk | 10 | (0) |
| 2015–2020 | Ural Yekaterinburg | 86 | (0) |
| 2015 | → Baikal Irkutsk (loan) | 13 | (0) |
| 2020–2021 | Rubin Kazan | 9 | (0) |
| 2021–2023 | Rijeka | 4 | (1) |

International career
| 2013–2014 | Russia U19 | 6 | (0) |
| 2015 | Russia U21 | 1 | (0) |
- * Club domestic league appearances and goals

Mikhail Viktorovich Merkulov (Russian: Михаил Викторович Меркулов; born 26 January 1994) is a Russian former footballer who played as a left-back.

== Club career ==
He made his debut in the Russian Second Division for FC Rotor Volgograd on 5 June 2011 in a game against FC MITOS Novocherkassk.

He made his Russian Premier League for FC Ural Sverdlovsk Oblast on 28 April 2016 in a game against PFC CSKA Moscow.

On 6 June 2020, he signed a two-year contract with FC Rubin Kazan after his contract with Ural had ended.

On 28 July 2021, he moved to Croatian club Rijeka. Merkulov retired in September 2023 due to injury.

== Career statistics ==
=== Club ===
As of 13 May 2018

| Club | Season | League | | | Cup | | Continental | | Other | | Total | |
| Club | Season | Division | Apps | Goals | Apps | Goals | Apps | Goals | Apps | Goals | Apps | Goals |
|---|---|---|---|---|---|---|---|---|---|---|---|---|
| FC Rotor Volgograd | 2011–12 | PFL | 4 | 0 | 0 | 0 | – | | – | | 4 | 0 |
| FC Energiya Volzhsky | 2012–13 | PFL | 11 | 0 | 0 | 0 | – | | – | | 11 | 0 |
| FC Rotor Volgograd | 2012–13 | FNL | 0 | 0 | – | | – | | 3 (Note: Three appearances in FNL Cup) | 0 | 3 | 0 |
| FC Rotor Volgograd | 2013–14 | FNL | 2 | 0 | 1 | 0 | – | | – | | 3 | 0 |
| FC Rotor Volgograd | 2014–15 | PFL | 3 | 0 | 0 | 0 | – | | – | | 3 | 0 |
| FC Rotor Volgograd | Total (2 spells) | | 9 | 0 | 1 | 0 | 0 | 0 | 3 | 0 | 13 | 0 |
| FC MITOS Novocherkassk | 2014–15 | PFL | 10 | 0 | 0 | 0 | – | | – | | 10 | 0 |
| FC Baikal Irkutsk | 2015–16 | FNL | 13 | 0 | 2 | 0 | – | | – | | 15 | 0 |
| FC Ural Yekaterinburg | 2015–16 | Russian Premier League | 4 | 0 | – | | – | | – | | 4 | 0 |
| FC Ural Yekaterinburg | 2016–17 | Russian Premier League | 11 | 0 | 3 | 0 | – | | – | | 14 | 0 |
| FC Ural Yekaterinburg | 2017–18 | Russian Premier League | 25 | 0 | 1 | 0 | – | | – | | 26 | 0 |
| FC Ural Yekaterinburg | Total | | 40 | 0 | 4 | 0 | 0 | 0 | 0 | 0 | 44 | 0 |
| Career total | | | 83 | 0 | 7 | 0 | 0 | 0 | 3 | 0 | 93 | 0 |
