= Nikita Makarov =

Russian footballer

Personal information
- Full name: Nikita Vitalyevich Makarov
- Date of birth: 2 January 2001 (age 25)
- Place of birth: Ulyanovsk, Russia
- Height: 1.80 m (5 ft 11 in)
- Position: Midfielder

Youth career
- FC Rubin Kazan

Senior career*
Years	Team	Apps	(Gls)
2018–2021	FC Rubin Kazan	3	(0)
2020	→ FC Veles Moscow (loan)	3	(0)

International career^{‡}
2016	Russia U-16	3	(0)
2019	Russia U-18	3	(0)
2019	Russia U-19	4	(0)
- * Club domestic league appearances and goals as of 5 December 2020 ‡ National team caps and goals as of 19 November 2019

Nikita Vitalyevich Makarov (Russian: Никита Витальевич Макаров; born 2 January 2001) is a Russian football player.

== Club career ==
He first was registered as a player of the senior squad of FC Rubin Kazan in February 2018. He made his debut in the Russian Premier League for Rubin on 10 August 2019 in a game against FC Krasnodar.

On 15 July 2020, he joined FC Veles Moscow on loan.
