= 2020–21 FC Tambov season =

FC Tambov
2020–21 season
- Chairman: Georgi Yartsev
- Manager: Sergei Pervushin
- Stadium: Mordovia Arena
- Premier League: 16th
- Russian Cup: Round of 16 vs Lokomotiv Moscow
- Top goalscorer: League: German Onugkha (4); All: German Onugkha (6)
- Highest home attendance: 14,977 vs Spartak Moscow (26 September 2020)
- Lowest home attendance: 0 vs Akhmat Grozny (7 November 2020) vs Rubin Kazan (13 December 2020) vs Ural Yekaterinburg (18 December 2020) vs Rotor Volgograd (26 February 2021) vs Krasnodar (14 March 2021)
- Average home league attendance: 3,172 (16 May 2021)
Home colours	Away colours	Third colours

The 2020–21 FC Tambov season was Tambov's second season in the Russian Premier League, the highest tier of association football in Russia. They finished the season in 16th position, being relegated back to the Russian Football National League, and were knocked out of the Russian Cup by eventual champions Lokomotiv Moscow in the Round of 16.

== Season events ==
On 1 August 2020, Shelia left Tambov to sign for Akhmat Grozny.

On 3 August, Tambov announced the signing of Sergey Ryzhikov to a one-year contract, whilst Aleksandre Karapetian and Vitaliy Balashov joined on two-year contracts.

On 23 February, David Toshevski joined Tambov on loan from Rostov for the remainder of the season.

== Squad ==
As of 9 March 2021

Note: Flags indicate national team as defined under FIFA eligibility rules; some limited exceptions apply. Players may hold more than one non-FIFA nationality.

No.	Pos.	Nation	Player
2	DF	RUS	Moris Nusuev
3	DF	RUS	Aleksandr Denisov (on loan from Arsenal Tula)
4	MF	MDA	Cătălin Carp
5	MF	RUS	Aleksandr Yerkin
7	MF	RUS	Azer Aliyev
8	MF	BLR	Dmitry German
9	FW	RUS	Artyom Arkhipov (on loan from Kuban Krasnodar)
10	MF	RUS	Yevgeni Chabanov (on loan from Kuban Krasnodar)
13	DF	RUS	Vitali Shakhov
14	MF	RUS	Yuri Bavin (on loan from Ural Yekaterinburg)
17	DF	RUS	Zurab Gigashvili
18	FW	RUS	Kirill Klimov (on loan from Rubin Kazan)
19	MF	RUS	Anton Terekhov (on loan from Dynamo Moscow)
23	MF	RUS	Vladislav Karapuzov (on loan from Dynamo Moscow)
24	DF	RUS	Denis Kaykov (on loan from Neftekhimik Nizhnekamsk)
26	DF	TJK	Farkhod Vosiyev
27	MF	RUS	Eddi Tsanava
28	MF	RUS	Nikita Vasilyev
30	GK	BLR	Rodion Syamuk

No.	Pos.	Nation	Player
31	MF	RUS	Nikita Drozdov
32	GK	RUS	Ilya Korablyov
35	GK	RUS	Vitali Sychyov
36	DF	RUS	Maksim Getsold
37	FW	RUS	Roman Minayev (on loan from Arsenal Tula)
42	MF	NGR	Lawrence Nicholas
47	DF	RUS	Aleksandr Pavliy
51	MF	RUS	Aleksandr Strukov
55	DF	RUS	Ilya Martynov (on loan from Krasnodar)
57	DF	RUS	Valentin Prilepin (on loan from Volga Ulyanovsk)
61	DF	RUS	Kirill Kozyavkin
74	MF	RUS	Timofey Kostenko
76	MF	RUS	Daniil Zhitlov
77	MF	RUS	Said-Ali Akhmayev
81	MF	RUS	Vladimir Kabakhidze
87	MF	RUS	Tigran Avanesyan (on loan from CSKA Moscow)
88	GK	RUS	Roman Danilov
91	DF	RUS	Grigori Gvardeyev
99	FW	MKD	David Toshevski (on loan from Rostov)

=== Out on loan ===
Note: Flags indicate national team as defined under FIFA eligibility rules; some limited exceptions apply. Players may hold more than one non-FIFA nationality.

No.	Pos.	Nation	Player
—	DF	RUS	Adessoye Oyewole (at (Russia) Orenburg)

== Transfers ==
=== In ===
Date	Position	Nationality	Name	From	Fee	Ref.
3 August 2020	GK	(Russia)	Sergey Ryzhikov	Krylia Sovetov	Free	
3 August 2020	FW	(Armenia)	Aleksandre Karapetian	Sochi	Free	
3 August 2020	FW	(Ukraine)	Vitaliy Balashov	Olimpik Donetsk	Free	
6 August 2020	FW	(Russia)	Kirill Panchenko	Dynamo Moscow	Free	
7 August 2020	DF	(Russia)	Nikita Chicherin	Krylia Sovetov	Undisclosed	
10 August 2020	DF	(Russia)	Aleksei Gritsayenko	Krasnodar	Undisclosed	
6 October 2020	DF	(Armenia)	Varazdat Haroyan	Ural Yekaterinburg	Free	
9 October 2020	MF	(Ghana)	Mohammed Rabiu	Paris	Undisclosed	
12 October 2020	DF	(Russia)	Vitali Shakhov	Orenburg	Undisclosed	
14 October 2020	DF	(Belarus)	Maksim Valadzko	Arsenal Tula	Undisclosed	
20 February 2021	DF	(Tajikistan)	Farkhod Vosiyev	Unattached	Free	
20 February 2021	MF	(Russia)	Nikita Drozdov	Fakel Voronezh	Undisclosed	
20 February 2021	FW	(Russia)	Said Aliyev	Veles Moscow	Undisclosed	
24 February 2021	MF	(Russia)	Azer Aliyev	Ufa	Undisclosed	
25 February 2021	GK	(Belarus)	Rodion Syamuk	Torpedo-BelAZ Zhodino	Undisclosed	
25 February 2021	DF	(Russia)	Moris Nusuev	Merani Tbilisi	Undisclosed	
25 February 2021	DF	(Russia)	Valentin Prilepin	Volga Ulyanovsk	Undisclosed	
25 February 2021	MF	(Belarus)	Dmitry German	Noah Jūrmala	Undisclosed	
25 February 2021	MF	(Russia)	Aleksandr Yerkin	Noah Jūrmala	Undisclosed	
25 February 2021	DF	(Moldova)	Cătălin Carp	Ufa	Undisclosed	

=== Loans in ===
Date from	Position	Nationality	Name	From	Date to	Ref.
7 August 2020	DF	(Russia)	Aleksandr Golovnya	Rodina Moscow	9 October 2020	
11 August 2020	FW	(Russia)	German Onugkha	Krasnodar	26 January 2020	
5 September 2020	MF	(Luxembourg)	Sébastien Thill	Progrès Niederkorn	21 January 2020	
13 October 2020	MF	(Uzbekistan)	Jasurbek Jaloliddinov	Lokomotiv Moscow	25 January 2020	
20 February 2021	DF	(Russia)	Aleksandr Denisov	Arsenal Tula	End of season	
20 February 2021	MF	(Russia)	Yevgeni Chabanov	Kuban Krasnodar	End of season	
20 February 2021	FW	(Russia)	Roman Minayev	Arsenal Tula	End of season	
20 February 2021	MF	(Russia)	Tigran Avanesyan	CSKA Moscow	End of season	
20 February 2021	FW	(Russia)	Kirill Klimov	Rubin Kazan	End of season	
21 February 2021	MF	(Russia)	Vladislav Karapuzov	Dynamo Moscow	End of season	
23 February 2020	FW	(North Macedonia)	David Toshevski	Rostov	End of season	
25 February 2020	DF	(Russia)	Denis Kaykov	Neftekhimik Nizhnekamsk	End of season	
25 February 2020	DF	(Russia)	Ilya Martynov	Krasnodar	End of season	
25 February 2020	MF	(Russia)	Yuri Bavin	Ural Yekaterinburg	End of season	
25 February 2020	FW	(Russia)	Artyom Arkhipov	Kuban Krasnodar	End of season	
25 February 2020	FW	(Russia)	Anton Terekhov	Dynamo Moscow	End of season	

=== Out ===
Date	Position	Nationality	Name	To	Fee	Ref.
27 July 2020	GK	(Russia)	Vladimir Sugrobov	SKA-Khabarovsk	Undisclosed	
1 August 2020	GK	(Russia)	Giorgi Shelia	Akhmat Grozny	Undisclosed	
1 October 2020	FW	(Russia)	Vladimir Obukhov	Rostov	Undisclosed	
11 October 2020	FW	(Russia)	Kirill Panchenko	Arsenal Tula	Undisclosed	
13 January 2021	DF	(Russia)	Aleksei Rybin	Kuban Krasnodar	Undisclosed	
20 January 2021	DF	(Russia)	Yevgeni Shlyakov	UTA Arad	Undisclosed	
17 February 2021	FW	(Russia)	Artyom Arkhipov	Kuban Krasnodar	Undisclosed	
10 February 2021	DF	(Belarus)	Maksim Valadzko	BATE Borisov	Undisclosed	
20 February 2021	DF	(Russia)	Ilya Mamkin	Fakel-M Voronezh	Undisclosed	
20 February 2021	MF	(Russia)	Vladimir Gosinkeyev	Rotor Volgograd	Undisclosed	
20 February 2021	MF	(Russia)	Pavel Karasyov	BATE Borisov	Undisclosed	
20 February 2021	MF	(Russia)	Anton Kilin	Akron Tolyatti	Undisclosed	
25 February 2021	MF	(Russia)	Oleg Chernyshov	Aktobe	Undisclosed	
11 March 2021	FW	(Russia)	Said Aliyev	Krymteplytsia Molodizhne	Undisclosed	

=== Loans out ===
Date from	Position	Nationality	Name	To	Date to	Ref.
11 June 2020	FW	(Russia)	Sergei Arkhipov	Shakhtyor Soligorsk	End of Season	
6 August 2020	FW	(Russia)	Artyom Fedchuk	Nizhny Novgorod	1 February 2021	
6 February 2021	DF	(Russia)	Adessoye Oyewole	Orenburg	End of season	

=== Released ===
Date	Position	Nationality	Name	Joined	Date	Ref.
9 October 2020	FW	(Ukraine)	Vitaliy Balashov	Shakhter Karagandy	2 March 2021	
31 December 2020	FW	(Russia)	Andrei Chasovskikh	Kuban Krasnodar		
31 December 2020	FW	(Russia)	Sergei Arkhipov	Kuban Krasnodar		
11 January 2021	DF	(Ukraine)	Oleksandr Kapliyenko	Torpedo Moscow	12 February 2021	
27 January 2021	DF	(Russia)	Guram Tetrashvili	Okzhetpes		
1 February 2021	DF	(Russia)	Aleksei Gritsayenko	Rubin Kazan	1 February 2021	
1 February 2021	MF	(Ghana)	Mohammed Rabiu			
1 February 2021	MF	(Russia)	Mikhail Kostyukov	Rubin Kazan	1 February 2021	
3 February 2021	MF	(Moldova)	Valeriu Ciupercă	Astana	1 March 2021	
4 February 2021	FW	(Russia)	Artyom Fedchuk	Veles Moscow	4 February 2021	
5 February 2021	FW	(Armenia)	Aleksandre Karapetian	Ararat-Armenia	9 February 2021	
10 February 2021	DF	(Armenia)	Varazdat Haroyan	Astana	15 February 2021	
10 February 2021	DF	(Russia)	Soslan Takazov	Kuban Krasnodar	17 February 2021	
18 February 2021	GK	(Russia)	Nikita Kotov	Nosta Novotroitsk		
18 February 2021	MF	(Russia)	Artyom Doronin			
18 February 2021	MF	(Russia)	Yegor Tsvetkov			
19 February 2021	GK	(Russia)	Maksim Mikhalyov			
19 February 2021	DF	(Russia)	Dmitri Ignatenko			
19 February 2021	DF	(Russia)	Andrei Komov			
19 February 2021	DF	(Russia)	Mikhail Smolyakov			
19 February 2021	DF	(Russia)	Aleksandr Yevtin			
19 February 2021	MF	(Russia)	Arsen Kabolov			
19 February 2021	MF	(Russia)	Aleksandr Malin			
19 February 2021	MF	(Russia)	Georgi Mdzeluri			
19 February 2021	MF	(Russia)	Arkadi Solop	Sochi		
21 February 2021	MF	(Russia)	Nikita Chicherin	Akron Tolyatti	22 February 2021	
21 February 2021	MF	(Russia)	Denis Skrypnikov			
25 February 2021	GK	(Russia)	Nikita Chagrov	Kórdrengir		
25 February 2021	FW	(Russia)	Dmitri Merenchukov	Rodina Moscow		
9 March 2021	GK	(Russia)	Sergey Ryzhikov			

== Friendlies ==
23 January 2021	Tambov	1 – 2	Yenisey Krasnoyarsk	Krymsk
MSK (UTC+3)	Trialist 85'	Report	Lescano 16'; Markov 83'

== Competitions ==
=== Overview ===
Competition	First match	Last match	Starting round	Final position	Record							
Competition	First match	Last match	Starting round	Final position	Pld	W	D	L	GF	GA	GD	Win %
Premier League	8 August 2020	May 2021	Matchday 1		30	3	4	23	19	65	−46	10.00
Russian Cup	2020		Round of 32	Round of 16	3	2	0	1	4	4	+0	66.67
Total					33	5	4	24	23	69	−46	15.15

Last updated: 16 May 2021
Source: Competitions

=== Premier League ===
==== League table ====
Pos	Team	Pld	W	D	L	GF	GA	GD	Pts	Qualification or relegation
12	Ural Yekaterinburg	30	7	13	10	26	36	−10	34	
13	Ufa	30	6	7	17	26	46	−20	25	
14	Arsenal Tula	30	6	5	19	28	51	−23	23	
15	Rotor Volgograd (R)	30	5	7	18	15	52	−37	22	Relegation to Football National League
16	Tambov (D)	30	3	4	23	19	65	−46	13	Dissolved after the season (Note: On 19 May 2021, FC Tambov announced that most of the staff and players were released from their contracts and the club began the process of liquidation.)

Source: Premier Liga
Rules for classification: 1) Points; 2) Head-to-head points; 3) Head-to-head matches won; 4) Head-to-head goal difference; 5) Head-to-head goals scored; 6) Matches won; 7) Goal difference; 8) Goals scored; 9) Play-off.
(D) Disqualified; (R) Relegated

==== Results summary ====
Overall								Home						Away					
Pld	W	D	L	GF	GA	GD	Pts	W	D	L	GF	GA	GD	W	D	L	GF	GA	GD
30	3	4	23	19	65	−46	13	2	2	11	11	29	−18	1	2	12	8	36	−28

Last updated: 16 May 2021.
Source: See Results

==== Results by round ====
Round	1	2	3	4	5	6	7	8	9	10	11	12	13	14	15	16	17	18	19	20	21	22	23	24	25	26	27	28	29	30
Ground	H	A	H	A	H	A	H	A	H	H	A	A	H	H	A	A	A	H	H	A	A	H	A	H	A	A	H	A	A	H
Result	L	L	W	L	L	D	W	L	L	D	W	D	L	L	L	L	L	L	D	L	L	L	L	L	L	L	L	L	L	L
Position	11	16	11	14	14	14	12	13	13	12	12	11	12	13	14	14	15	15	16	16	16	16	16	16	16	16	16	16	16	16

Updated to match(es) played on 16 May 2021. Source: Premier Liga
A = Away; H = Home; W = Win; D = Draw; L = Loss

==== Results ====
8 August 2020 1	Tambov	0 – 1	Rostov	Saransk
18:30 MSK (UTC+3)	Tetrashvili (yellow card) 38'; Kostyukov (yellow card) 73'	Report	Popov (yellow card) 3'; Mamayev 21'; Zaynutdinov (yellow card) 35'; Hadžikadunić (yellow card) 76'	Stadium: Mordovia Arena; Attendance: 2,468; Referee: Stanislav Vasilyev
Note: Match played at the Mordovia Arena in Saransk instead of Tambov's regular Spartak Stadium.

15 August 2020 2	CSKA Moscow	2 – 1	Tambov	Moscow
18:00 MSK (UTC+3)	Kuchayev 29'; Shkurin 55'; Akinfeev (yellow card) 90+'	Report	Karapetian 42' (yellow card) 76'	Stadium: VEB Arena; Attendance: 7,939; Referee: Vladimir Moskalyov

18 August 2020 3	Tambov	1 – 0	Khimki	Saransk
19:00 MSK (UTC+3)	Ciupercă 14' (yellow card) 42'; Gritsayenko (red card) 40'; Obukhov (penalty missed) 51'; Shlyakov (yellow card) 79'	Report	Dyadyun (yellow card) 45+1'; Lomovitsky (yellow card) 52'; Troshechkin (yellow card) 67'; Konaté (yellow card) 70'; Tikhiy (yellow card) 86'; Polyarus (yellow card) 90+1'; Koryan (yellow card) 90+2'	Stadium: Mordovia Arena; Attendance: 1,820; Referee: Mikhail Vilkov
Note: Match played at the Mordovia Arena in Saransk instead of Tambov's regular Spartak Stadium.

22 August 2020 4	Zenit St.Petersburg	4 – 1	Tambov	Saint Petersburg
18:00 MSK (UTC+3)	Driussi (yellow card) 21'; Santos 41'; Malcom 47'; Yerokhin 68'; Azmoun 74'	Report	Chicherin (yellow card) 5'; Kabakhidze (yellow card) 65'; Panchenko 85'	Stadium: Krestovsky Stadium; Attendance: 20,782; Referee: Igor Panin

25 August 2020 5	Tambov	0 – 1	Sochi	Saransk
18:30 MSK (UTC+3)	Onugkha (yellow card) 79'; Oyewole (yellow card) 90+3'	Report	Margasov (yellow card) 62'; Noboa 90+2'	Stadium: Mordovia Arena; Attendance: 2,100; Referee: Aleksei Matyunin
Note: Match played at the Mordovia Arena in Saransk instead of Tambov's regular Spartak Stadium.

30 August 2020 6	Rubin Kazan	2 – 2	Tambov	Kazan
18:00 MSK (UTC+3)	Hwang (yellow card) 30'; Despotović 45+', 90'; Uremović (yellow card) 71'; Abildgaard (yellow card) 88'	Report	Karapetian 15'; Rybin (yellow card) 51'; Karasyov 85'	Stadium: Ak Bars Arena; Attendance: 4,515; Referee: Vitali Meshkov

12 September 2020 7	Tambov	2 – 0	Ufa	Saransk
13:45 MSK (UTC+3)	Oyewole (yellow card) 7'; Gritsayenko 42'; Kostyukov 79'; Kapliyenko (yellow card) 83'	Report	Sukhov (yellow card) 31'; Aliyev (yellow card) 40'; Nedelcearu (yellow card) 61'; Thill (yellow card) 62'	Stadium: Mordovia Arena; Attendance: 2,567; Referee: Kirill Levnikov
Note: Match played at the Mordovia Arena in Saransk instead of Tambov's regular Spartak Stadium.

20 September 2020 8	Lokomotiv Moscow	1 – 0	Tambov	Moscow
19:00 MSK (UTC+3)	Smolov 7'; Krychowiak (yellow card) 47'; Eder (yellow card) 55'; Zhivoglyadov (yellow card) 61'; Magkeyev (yellow card) 67'; Zhemaletdinov (yellow card) 86'	Report	Shlyakov (yellow card) 41'; Ryzhikov (yellow card) 65'	Stadium: RZD Arena; Attendance: 6,508; Referee: Evgeny Turbin

26 September 2020 9	Tambov	0 – 2	Spartak Moscow	Saransk
14:00 MSK (UTC+3)	Balashov (yellow card) 40'; Ciupercă (yellow card) 57'; Chagrov (yellow card) 82'; Kapliyenko (yellow card) 90'	Report	Kutepov (yellow card) 10'; Ponce (yellow card) 55'; Ayrton 75', 84'; Zobnin (yellow card) 87'	Stadium: Mordovia Arena; Attendance: 14,977; Referee: Igor Panin
Note: Match played at the Mordovia Arena in Saransk instead of Tambov's regular Spartak Stadium.

3 October 2020 10	Tambov	1 – 1	Arsenal Tula	Saransk
16:30 MSK (UTC+3)	Ciupercă 87' (pen.)	Report	K.Kangwa (yellow card) 5'; Kostadinov (yellow card) 27'; Kadiri 43'; Belyayev (yellow card) 77'; Gorbatenko (yellow card) 86'; Zlobin (yellow card) 88'	Stadium: Mordovia Arena; Attendance: 1,983; Referee: Vladislav Bezborodov
Note: Match played at the Mordovia Arena in Saransk instead of Tambov's regular Spartak Stadium.

18 October 2020 11	Rotor Volgograd	0 – 2	Tambov	Volgograd
16:00 MSK (UTC+3)	Zhigulyov (yellow card) 21'; Davitashvili (penalty missed) 28; Makarov (yellow card) 34'; Stepanov (yellow card) 90'	Report	Haroyan (yellow card) 26'; Karapetian 58'; Ciupercă (yellow card) 62'; Onugkha (yellow card) 70' (goal) 82'; Kabakhidze (yellow card) 90+'	Stadium: Volgograd Arena; Attendance: 6,871; Referee: Vasilly Kazartsev

25 October 2020 12	Ural Yekaterinburg	0 – 0	Tambov	Yekaterinburg
14:00 MSK (UTC+3)	Pogrebnyak (yellow card) 15'; Podberyozkin (yellow card) 27'; Jovičić (yellow card) 40'; Zolotov (yellow card) 76'; Rykov (yellow card) 81'; Miškić (yellow card) 90+'	Report	Kapliyenko (yellow card) 45+'; Ciupercă (yellow card) 54'; Ryzhikov (yellow card) 90+'; Onugkha (yellow card) 90+'	Stadium: Central Stadium; Attendance: 3,427; Referee: Evgeny Kukulyak

1 November 2020 13	Tambov	1 – 2	Dynamo Moscow	Saransk
19:00 MSK (UTC+3)	Kapliyenko (yellow card) 2'; Kilin (yellow card) 44' (yellow-red card) 54'; Karasyov (yellow card) 57'; Tetrashvili (red card) 60'; Onugkha 64' (pen.) (penalty missed) 90+'; Shlyakov (yellow card) 90+'	Report	Szymański (yellow card) 6'; Lesovoy 8'; Neustädter (yellow card) 32'; Ordets (yellow card) 63'; Komlichenko 90+' (yellow card) 90+'	Stadium: Mordovia Arena; Attendance: 2,091; Referee: Sergei Karasev
Note: Match played at the Mordovia Arena in Saransk instead of Tambov's regular Spartak Stadium.

7 November 2020 14	Tambov	0 – 1	Akhmat Grozny	Saransk
19:00 MSK (UTC+3)	Onugkha (yellow card) 44'	Report	Nenakhov (yellow card) 33'; Ilyin (yellow card) 82'; Timofeyev 87'	Stadium: Mordovia Arena; Referee: Sergey Ivanov
Note: Match played at the Mordovia Arena in Saransk instead of Tambov's regular Spartak Stadium.

21 November 2020 15	Krasnodar	1 – 0	Tambov	Krasnodar
14:00 MSK (UTC+3)	Cabella 17'; Sorokin (yellow card) 32' (yellow-red card) 60'; Ionov (yellow card) 33'; Martynovich (yellow card) 52'; Kambolov (yellow card) 70'; Ramírez (yellow card) 90+'	Report	Kapliyenko (yellow card) 35'; Haroyan (yellow card) 49' (yellow-red card) 64'; Kostyukov (yellow card) 56'; Rybin (yellow card) 71'; Gritsayenko (yellow card) 79'	Stadium: Krasnodar Stadium; Attendance: 9,287; Referee: Sergey Lapochkin

29 November 2020 16	Ufa	4 – 0	Tambov	Ufa
14:00 MSK (UTC+3)	Zhamaletdinov 11', 54' (yellow card) 48'; Kamilov 45+'; Golubev (yellow card) 45+'; Danchenko (yellow card) 76'; Mrzljak 79'; Andrić (penalty missed) 90+'	Report	Gritsayenko (yellow card) 15' (yellow-red card) 37'; Kostyukov (yellow card) 42'; Onugkha (yellow card) 48'; Ciupercă (penalty missed) 74'; Ryzhikov (yellow card) 90+'	Stadium: Neftyanik Stadium; Attendance: 1,465; Referee: Aleksei Matyunin

5 December 2020 17	Spartak Moscow	5 – 1	Tambov	Moscow
16:30 MSK (UTC+3)	Larsson 27', 83'; Ponce 63', 90+'; Gigot 87'	Report	Onugkha 65'; Chicherin (yellow card) 83'	Stadium: Otkritie Arena; Attendance: Stanislav Vasiliev; Referee: 5,964

13 December 2020 18	Tambov	0 – 1	Rubin Kazan	Saransk
14:00 MSK (UTC+3)	Valadzko (yellow card) 45'; Haroyan (yellow card) 56'	Report	Kvaratskhelia (yellow card) 13'; Samoshnikov 20'; Despotović (yellow card) 56'	Stadium: Mordovia Arena; Referee: Kirill Levnikov
Note: Match played at the Mordovia Arena in Saransk instead of Tambov's regular Spartak Stadium.

18 December 2020 19	Tambov	1 – 1	Ural Yekaterinburg	Saransk
18:00 MSK (UTC+3)	Ciupercă (yellow card) 9'; Kostyukov (yellow card) 15'; Onugkha 45'; Kabakhidze (yellow card) 46'; Haroyan (yellow card) 59'	Report	El Kabir 29' (penalty missed) 61'; Yegorychev (yellow card) 45+'; Gerasimov (yellow card) 47'	Stadium: Mordovia Arena; Referee: Sergey Ivanov

26 February 2021 20	Tambov	1 – 3	Rotor Volgograd	Saransk
19:00 MSK (UTC+3)	Arkhipov 41'; Avanesyan (yellow card) 90+2'	Report	Bairyyev (yellow card) 10'; Gigashvili 54' (o.g.); Zhigulyov (yellow card) 56'; Ponce 58'; Kipiani 72'	Stadium: Mordovia Arena; Referee: Ivan Sidenkov

7 March 2021 21	Dynamo Moscow	2 – 0	Tambov	Moscow
16:30 MSK (UTC+3)	Grulyov 37'; Fomin (yellow card) 55'; Moro 90' (pen.)	Report	Karapuzov (yellow card) 9'; Terekhov (yellow card) 56'	Stadium: VTB Arena; Attendance: 7,502; Referee: Evgeny Kukulyak

14 March 2021 22	Tambov	0 – 4	Krasnodar	Saransk
16:30 MSK (UTC+3)	Karapuzov (yellow card) 32'; Shakhov (yellow card) 90'	Report	Cabella (yellow card) 26' (goal) 27'; Gazinsky 68'; Olsson 75'; Markov (yellow card) 86'; Ionov 88' (pen.)	Stadium: Mordovia Arena; Referee: Pavel Shadykhanov

19 March 2021 23	Sochi	5 – 0	Tambov	Sochi
19:00 MSK (UTC+3)	Novoseltsev (yellow card) 25'; A.Zabolotny (yellow card) 31' (goal) 45+', 80'; Terekhov 55'; Mevlja (yellow card) 62'; Rudenko 74'; Barsov 90'	Report	Shakhov (yellow card) 2'; Klimov (yellow card) 12'	Stadium: Fisht Olympic Stadium; Attendance: 3,147; Referee: Artyom Lyubimov

4 April 2021 24	Tambov	1 – 2	CSKA Moscow	Saransk
16:30 MSK (UTC+3)	Karapuzov (yellow card) 7'; Arkhipov 16' (pen.) (yellow card) 63'; Klimov (yellow card) 17'; Carp (yellow card) 45'; Bavin (yellow card) 51'	Report	Vlašić 26' (pen.) (penalty missed) 64; Rondón 52' (pen.); Bohinen (yellow card) 54'	Stadium: Mordovia Arena; Attendance: 7,540; Referee: Vitali Meshkov

10 April 2021 25	Khimki	1 – 0	Tambov	Khimki
14:00 MSK (UTC+3)	Glushakov 59'	Report	Arkhipov (yellow card) 5'	Stadium: Arena Khimki; Attendance: 1,230; Referee: Vladislav Bezborodov

18 April 2021 26	Arsenal Tula	4 – 0	Tambov	Tula
14:00 MSK (UTC+3)	Bauer 11' (pen.); Lutsenko 25'; E.Kangwa (yellow card) 54'; Tkachyov 65'; Khlusevich 66' Lomovitsky (yellow card) 78'	Report	Bavin (yellow card) 27'; Martynov (yellow card) 35'	Stadium: Arsenal Stadium; Attendance: 6,420; Referee: Evgeny Kukulyak

24 April 2021 27	Tambov	2 – 5	Lokomotiv Moscow	Saransk
19:00 MSK (UTC+3)	Aliyev 45+'; Bavin (yellow card) 49' (penalty missed) 77'; Arkhipov (yellow card) 75'; Kaykov 78'	Report	Magkeyev (yellow card) 26'; Krychowiak 40', 60'; Smolov 47'; Murilo 74'; Rybus 80'	Stadium: Mordovia Arena; Attendance: 4,921; Referee: Pavel Shadykhanov

2 May 2021 28	Rostov	2 – 0	Tambov	Rostov-on-Don
16:30 MSK (UTC+3)	Gigović (yellow card) 41'; Hashimoto (yellow card) 54' (goal) 78'; Poloz 70'	Report	Karapuzov (yellow card) 11'; Carp (yellow card) 53'	Stadium: Rostov Arena; Attendance: 13,251; Referee: Igor Panin

7 May 2021 29	Akhmat Grozny	3 – 1	Tambov	Grozny
18:00 MSK (UTC+3)	Kharin 15'; Polyarus 18'; Ismael (yellow card) 44'; Sadulayev (yellow card) 66'; Alsultanov (yellow card) 72'; Ilyin (yellow card) 77' (goal) 80'	Report	Kabakhidze (yellow card) 4'; Arkhipov 63'; Denisov (yellow card) 86'	Stadium: Akhmat-Arena; Attendance: 7,475; Referee: Aleksei Matyunin

16 May 2021 30	Tambov	1 – 5	Zenit St.Petersburg	Saransk
14:00 MSK (UTC+3)	Klimov 45'	Report	Dzyuba 11', 55', 72', 74'; Ozdoyev (yellow card) 45+'; Vosiyev 90+' (o.g.)	Stadium: Mordovia Arena; Attendance: 7,119; Referee: Anton Frolov

=== Russian Cup ===
==== Round of 32 ====
Pos	Team	Pld	W	D	L	GF	GA	GD	Pts	Qualification
1	Tambov	2	2	0	0	4	1	+3	6	Advance to Play-off
2	Mashuk-KMV Pyatigorsk	2	1	0	1	2	2	0	3	
3	Dynamo Bryansk	2	0	0	2	0	3	−3	0	

16 September 2020 1	Mashuk-KMV Pyatigorsk	1 – 2	Tambov	Pyatigorsk
16:00 MSK (UTC+3)	Krendelev (yellow card) 74' (goal) 90+4'		Onugkha 22' (yellow card) 31'; Kabakhidze (yellow card) 75'; Shlyakov (yellow card) 80'; Panchenko 81'	Stadium: Central Stadium; Referee: Sergey Kostevich

21 October 2020 2	Dynamo Bryansk	0 – 2	Tambov	Bryansk
16:00 MSK (UTC+3)		Report	Onugkha 12'; Thill (yellow card) 52'; Jaloliddinov (yellow card) 77'; Takazov 85'	Stadium: Dynamo Stadium; Referee: Ivan Sidenkov

==== Round of 16 ====
21 February 2021 Round of 16	Lokomotiv Moscow	3 – 0	Tambov	Moscow
17:00 MSK (UTC+3)	Pablo 27'; Kamano 58'; Krychowiak 82' (pen.)	Report		Stadium: RZD Arena; Attendance: 3,178; Referee: Vladislav Bezborodov

== Squad statistics ==
As of match played 16 May 2021

=== Appearances and goals ===
No.	Pos	Nat	Player	Total		Premier League		Russian Cup	
No.	Pos	Nat	Player	Apps	Goals	Apps	Goals	Apps	Goals
2	DF	(Russia) RUS	Moris Nusuev	2	0	0+2	0	0	0
3	DF	(Russia) RUS	Aleksandr Denisov	11	0	10	0	1	0
4	MF	(Moldova) MDA	Cătălin Carp	9	0	8+1	0	0	0
5	MF	(Russia) RUS	Aleksandr Yerkin	2	0	0+2	0	0	0
7	MF	(Russia) RUS	Azer Aliyev	10	1	8+2	1	0	0
8	MF	(Belarus) BLR	Dmitry German	6	0	3+3	0	0	0
9	FW	(Russia) RUS	Artyom Arkhipov	11	3	10+1	3	0	0
10	MF	(Russia) RUS	Yevgeni Chabanov	4	0	0+3	0	0+1	0
13	DF	(Russia) RUS	Vitali Shakhov	14	0	9+3	0	2	0
14	MF	(Russia) RUS	Yuri Bavin	9	0	9	0	0	0
17	DF	(Georgia (country)) GEO	Zurab Gigashvili	9	0	5+3	0	1	0
18	FW	(Russia) RUS	Kirill Klimov	12	1	5+6	1	0+1	0
19	FW	(Russia) RUS	Anton Terekhov	11	0	5+6	0	0	0
23	MF	(Russia) RUS	Vladislav Karapuzov	11	0	10	0	1	0
24	DF	(Russia) RUS	Denis Kaykov	9	1	9	1	0	0
26	DF	(Tajikistan) TJK	Farkhod Vosiyev	10	0	7+2	0	1	0
30	GK	(Belarus) BLR	Rodion Syamuk	5	0	5	0	0	0
31	MF	(Russia) RUS	Nikita Drozdov	10	0	2+7	0	1	0
35	GK	(Russia) RUS	Vitali Sychyov	4	0	4	0	0	0
37	FW	(Russia) RUS	Roman Minayev	7	0	2+4	0	1	0
42	MF	(Nigeria) NGR	Lawrence Nicholas	3	0	1+1	0	0+1	0
55	DF	(Russia) RUS	Ilya Martynov	6	0	5+1	0	0	0
77	FW	(Russia) RUS	Said-Ali Akhmayev	4	0	0+4	0	0	0
81	MF	(Russia) RUS	Vladimir Kabakhidze	19	0	10+6	0	3	0
87	MF	(Russia) RUS	Tigran Avanesyan	4	0	0+3	0	1	0
Players away from the club on loan:
58	DF	(Russia) RUS	Adessoye Oyewole	12	0	10+2	0	0	0
Players who appeared for Tambov but left during the season:
1	GK	(Russia) RUS	Sergey Ryzhikov	21	0	20	0	1	0
2	DF	(Russia) RUS	Aleksei Rybin	14	0	13	0	1	0
3	DF	(Russia) RUS	Guram Tetrashvili	13	0	10+2	0	0+1	0
5	DF	(Russia) RUS	Yevgeni Shlyakov	18	0	11+5	0	1+1	0
7	FW	(Ukraine) UKR	Vitaliy Balashov	7	0	2+4	0	1	0
7	MF	(Uzbekistan) UZB	Jasurbek Jaloliddinov	1	0	0	0	0+1	0
8	MF	(Russia) RUS	Anton Kilin	15	0	7+6	0	2	0
9	FW	(Russia) RUS	German Onugkha	13	6	7+4	4	2	2
10	FW	(Russia) RUS	Kirill Panchenko	11	2	6+4	1	0+1	1
11	DF	(Belarus) BLR	Maksim Valadzko	5	0	4	0	1	0
11	FW	(Russia) RUS	Said Aliyev	1	0	0	0	1	0
12	DF	(Russia) RUS	Aleksandr Golovnya	2	0	0+1	0	1	0
13	FW	(Russia) RUS	Vladimir Obukhov	10	0	6+3	0	0+1	0
18	DF	(Armenia) ARM	Varazdat Haroyan	9	0	8	0	1	0
19	MF	(Ghana) GHA	Mohammed Rabiu	2	0	1+1	0	0	0
25	MF	(Russia) RUS	Pavel Karasyov	21	1	15+4	1	1+1	0
27	DF	(Russia) RUS	Aleksei Gritsayenko	11	1	10	1	1	0
29	DF	(Ukraine) UKR	Oleksandr Kapliyenko	18	0	14+2	0	1+1	0
30	DF	(Russia) RUS	Soslan Takazov	9	1	6+1	0	1+1	1
31	MF	(Luxembourg) LUX	Sébastien Thill	8	0	2+5	0	1	0
44	DF	(Russia) RUS	Nikita Chicherin	10	0	8+2	0	0	0
73	GK	(Russia) RUS	Nikita Chagrov	3	0	1	0	2	0
77	MF	(Russia) RUS	Mikhail Kostyukov	18	1	11+5	1	1+1	0
87	FW	(Armenia) ARM	Aleksandre Karapetian	17	3	12+4	3	1	0
90	FW	(Russia) RUS	Dmitri Merenchukov	3	0	2	0	0+1	0
92	MF	(Moldova) MDA	Valeriu Ciupercă	17	2	16	2	0+1	0

=== Goal scorers ===
Place	Position	Nation	Number	Name	Premier League	Russian Cup	Total
1	FW	(Russia)	9	German Onugkha	4	2	6
2	FW	(Armenia)	87	Aleksandre Karapetian	3	0	3
2	FW	(Russia)	9	Artyom Arkhipov	3	0	3
4	MF	(Moldova)	92	Valeriu Ciupercă	2	0	2
4	FW	(Russia)	10	Kirill Panchenko	1	1	2
6	MF	(Russia)	25	Pavel Karasyov	1	0	1
6	DF	(Russia)	27	Aleksei Gritsayenko	1	0	1
6	MF	(Russia)	77	Mikhail Kostyukov	1	0	1
6	MF	(Russia)	7	Azer Aliyev	1	0	1
6	MF	(Russia)	24	Denis Kaykov	1	0	1
6	FW	(Russia)	18	Kirill Klimov	1	0	1
6	DF	(Russia)	30	Soslan Takazov	0	1	1
Total					19	4	23

=== Clean sheets ===
Place	Position	Nation	Number	Name	Premier League	Russian Cup	Total
1	GK	(Russia)	1	Sergey Ryzhikov	4	0	4
2	GK	(Russia)	73	Nikita Chagrov	0	1	1
Total					4	1	5

=== Disciplinary record ===
Number	Nation	Position	Name	Premier League		Russian Cup		Total	
Number	Nation	Position	Name	Yellow card	Red card	Yellow card	Red card	Yellow card	Red card
1	(Russia)	GK	Sergey Ryzhikov	3	0	0	0	3	0
3	(Russia)	DF	Aleksandr Denisov	1	0	0	0	1	0
4	(Moldova)	MF	Cătălin Carp	2	0	0	0	2	0
9	(Russia)	FW	Artyom Arkhipov	3	0	0	0	3	0
13	(Russia)	DF	Vitali Shakhov	2	0	0	0	2	0
14	(Russia)	MF	Yuri Bavin	3	0	0	0	3	0
18	(Russia)	FW	Kirill Klimov	2	0	0	0	2	0
23	(Russia)	MF	Vladislav Karapuzov	3	0	0	0	3	0
55	(Russia)	DF	Ilya Martynov	1	0	0	0	1	0
81	(Russia)	MF	Vladimir Kabakhidze	1	0	0	0	1	0
87	(Russia)	MF	Tigran Avanesyan	1	0	0	0	1	0
Players away on loan:
58	(Russia)	DF	Adessoye Oyewole	2	0	0	0	2	0
Players who left Tambov during the season:
2	(Russia)	DF	Aleksei Rybin	2	0	0	0	2	0
3	(Russia)	DF	Guram Tetrashvili	1	1	0	0	1	1
5	(Russia)	DF	Yevgeni Shlyakov	3	0	1	0	4	0
7	(Ukraine)	FW	Vitaliy Balashov	1	0	0	0	1	0
7	(Uzbekistan)	MF	Jasurbek Jaloliddinov	0	0	1	0	1	0
8	(Russia)	MF	Anton Kilin	2	1	0	0	2	1
9	(Russia)	FW	German Onugkha	5	0	1	0	6	0
11	(Belarus)	DF	Maksim Valadzko	1	0	0	0	1	0
19	(Russia)	FW	Anton Terekhov	1	0	0	0	1	0
18	(Armenia)	DF	Varazdat Haroyan	5	1	0	0	5	1
23	(Russia)	MF	Vladislav Karapuzov	1	0	0	0	1	0
25	(Russia)	MF	Pavel Karasyov	1	0	0	0	1	0
27	(Russia)	DF	Aleksei Gritsayenko	3	2	0	0	3	2
29	(Ukraine)	DF	Oleksandr Kapliyenko	5	0	0	0	5	0
31	(Luxembourg)	MF	Sébastien Thill	0	0	1	0	1	0
44	(Russia)	DF	Nikita Chicherin	2	0	0	0	2	0
73	(Russia)	GK	Nikita Chagrov	1	0	0	0	1	0
77	(Russia)	MF	Mikhail Kostyukov	4	0	0	0	4	0
81	(Russia)	MF	Vladimir Kabakhidze	3	0	1	0	4	0
87	(Armenia)	FW	Aleksandre Karapetian	1	0	0	0	1	0
92	(Moldova)	MF	Valeriu Ciupercă	5	0	0	0	5	0
Total				69	5	5	0	74	5
