= List of Russian football transfers winter 2020–21 =

This is a list of Russian football transfers by club in the 2020–21 winter transfer window. Only clubs of the 2020–21 Russian Premier League are included.

== Russian Premier League 2020–21 ==
=== Akhmat Grozny ===
In: Note: Flags indicate national team as defined under FIFA eligibility rules; some limited exceptions apply. Players may hold more than one non-FIFA nationality.

No.	Pos.	Nation	Player
9	FW	ROU	Gabriel Iancu (from (Romania) Viitorul Constanța)
18	FW	SVK	Ladislav Almási (on loan from (Slovakia) Ružomberok)
89	DF	RUS	Khamzat Khazhmukhambetov
92	MF	RUS	Abubakar Inalkayev

Out: Note: Flags indicate national team as defined under FIFA eligibility rules; some limited exceptions apply. Players may hold more than one non-FIFA nationality.

No.	Pos.	Nation	Player
5	DF	RUS	Arsen Adamov (to Ural Yekaterinburg)
19	MF	RUS	Oleg Ivanov (to Ufa)
21	MF	ALB	Odise Roshi (on loan to (Hungary) Diósgyőri)
92	FW	RUS	Khalid Khamzatov
—	MF	BRA	Ravanelli (on loan to (Brazil) Chapecoense, previously on loan to (Brazil) Athletico Paranaense)
—	FW	SEN	Ablaye Mbengue (on loan to (Belarus) Dinamo Minsk)

=== Arsenal Tula ===
In: Note: Flags indicate national team as defined under FIFA eligibility rules; some limited exceptions apply. Players may hold more than one non-FIFA nationality.

No.	Pos.	Nation	Player
21	MF	RUS	Igor Konovalov (on loan from Rubin Kazan)
41	FW	RUS	Denis Lutay
74	DF	RUS	Igor Klyushkin
78	DF	RUS	Maksim Kaynov (from UOR-5 Yegoryevsk)
87	MF	RUS	Makar Makarov
93	MF	RUS	Mark Krotov (free agent, last with Spartak Moscow)
94	FW	RUS	Danila Strelchuk (from Rubin Kazan)
96	FW	RUS	Aleksandr Konev (from Chertanovo Moscow)

Out: Note: Flags indicate national team as defined under FIFA eligibility rules; some limited exceptions apply. Players may hold more than one non-FIFA nationality.

No.	Pos.	Nation	Player
21	DF	GHA	Mohammed Kadiri (end of loan from (Ukraine) Dynamo Kyiv)
32	DF	RUS	Tamerlan Kuchiyev
41	MF	RUS	Yegor Makarov
59	FW	RUS	Pyotr Ivanov (to Dynamo Barnaul)
65	FW	RUS	Danil Polyakh (to Krasnodar)
68	FW	RUS	Dmitri Bykov
71	DF	RUS	Aleksandr Denisov (on loan to Tambov)
77	FW	RUS	Roman Minayev (on loan to Tambov)
78	DF	RUS	Yaroslav Garastyuk

=== CSKA Moscow ===
In: Note: Flags indicate national team as defined under FIFA eligibility rules; some limited exceptions apply. Players may hold more than one non-FIFA nationality.

No.	Pos.	Nation	Player
1	GK	RUS	Ilya Pomazun (end of loan to Ural Yekaterinburg)
32	FW	VEN	Salomón Rondón (on loan from (China) Dalian Professional)
64	DF	RUS	Aleksei Sukharev (from Avangard Kursk)
88	MF	NOR	Emil Bohinen (from (Norway) Stabæk)
96	MF	RUS	Aleksei Slivin (from own academy)

Out: Note: Flags indicate national team as defined under FIFA eligibility rules; some limited exceptions apply. Players may hold more than one non-FIFA nationality.

No.	Pos.	Nation	Player
13	DF	RUS	Nikita Kotin (on loan to Irtysh Omsk)
21	FW	ARG	Adolfo Gaich (on loan to (Italy) Benevento)
25	MF	CRO	Kristijan Bistrović (on loan to (Turkey) Kasımpaşa)
43	MF	RUS	Aleksei Pilipenko
59	MF	RUS	Tigran Avanesyan (on loan to Tambov)
74	MF	RUS	Grigori Lobanov (to Strogino Moscow)
—	DF	RUS	Maksim Yeleyev (on loan to Yenisey Krasnoyarsk, previously on loan to Akron Tolyatti)
—	MF	RUS	Vitali Zhironkin (on loan to KAMAZ Naberezhnye Chelny, previously on loan to Baltika Kaliningrad)
—	FW	MLI	Lassana N'Diaye (on loan to Veles Moscow, previously on loan to (Sweden) Eskilstuna)
—	FW	JPN	Takuma Nishimura (to (Japan) Vegalta Sendai, previously on loan)

=== Dynamo Moscow ===
In: Note: Flags indicate national team as defined under FIFA eligibility rules; some limited exceptions apply. Players may hold more than one non-FIFA nationality.

No.	Pos.	Nation	Player
12	MF	RUS	Danil Lipovoy (end of loan to Khimki)
78	MF	RUS	Georgy Sulakvelidze
80	DF	RUS	Stanislav Bessmertny
83	GK	RUS	Denis Davydov (from own academy)

Out: Note: Flags indicate national team as defined under FIFA eligibility rules; some limited exceptions apply. Players may hold more than one non-FIFA nationality.

No.	Pos.	Nation	Player
14	FW	RUS	Stanislav Latsevich
17	MF	RUS	Anton Terekhov (on loan to Tambov)
23	MF	RUS	Vladislav Karapuzov (on loan to Tambov)
33	FW	RUS	Maksim Danilin (on loan to Dynamo Bryansk)
34	DF	RUS	Konstantin Rausch
49	MF	RUS	Yevgeni Figurov
71	MF	RUS	Roman Denisov (to Neftekhimik Nizhnekamsk)
76	GK	RUS	Ilya Kuptsov
78	MF	RUS	Matvey Chekalin
80	MF	RUS	Eduard Dzhedzheya
83	FW	RUS	Arsen Dzhioyev
—	DF	RUS	Ilya Kalachyov (on loan to Neftekhimik Nizhnekamsk, previously on loan to Tom Tomsk)

=== Khimki ===
In: Note: Flags indicate national team as defined under FIFA eligibility rules; some limited exceptions apply. Players may hold more than one non-FIFA nationality.

No.	Pos.	Nation	Player
3	DF	SWE	Filip Dagerstål (from (Sweden) Norrköping)
9	MF	RUS	Maksim Glushenkov (on loan from Spartak Moscow)
19	FW	CIV	Senin Sebai (from (Kazakhstan) Tobol)
38	FW	RUS	Ilya Trynko
59	MF	RUS	Georgi Ketov
75	FW	RUS	Ilya Predeus (from (Slovakia) Zemplín Michalovce U19)
77	GK	RUS	Dadu Khidriyev (from Olimp-Dolgoprudny)
82	FW	RUS	Grisha Paronyan
86	MF	RUS	Andrei Yakushin (from Spartak Moscow academy)
92	DF	RUS	Artyom Krokhin (free agent, last with Kolomna)

Out: Note: Flags indicate national team as defined under FIFA eligibility rules; some limited exceptions apply. Players may hold more than one non-FIFA nationality.

No.	Pos.	Nation	Player
18	MF	RUS	Danil Lipovoy (end of loan from Dynamo Moscow)
20	MF	KAZ	Islambek Kuat (to (Kazakhstan) Astana)
51	DF	RUS	Sergei Mizgiryov
67	MF	RUS	Ivan Sergeyev (to Rubin Kazan)
—	MF	RUS	Nikita Balakhontsev (on loan to Novosibirsk, previously from Novosibirsk)

=== Krasnodar ===
In: Note: Flags indicate national team as defined under FIFA eligibility rules; some limited exceptions apply. Players may hold more than one non-FIFA nationality.

No.	Pos.	Nation	Player
12	GK	RUS	Yegor Baburin (on loan from Rostov)
17	DF	RUS	German Osnov (from Lokomotiv Moscow)
19	DF	RUS	Daur Chanba
21	FW	RUS	Igor Andreyev (from Nosta Novotroitsk)
25	DF	RUS	Maksim Demenko (from Tuapse)
44	DF	RUS	Sergei Borodin (end of loan to Ufa)
46	DF	RUS	Siyovush Khabibulloyev (from Sochi)
49	MF	RUS	Stanislav Basyrov
86	DF	RUS	Daniil Kornyushin (end of loan to Volgar Astrakhan)
87	MF	RUS	Akim Abdokov (from Dynamo Stavropol)
88	DF	RUS	Kirill Fomenko (from Izhorets-INKON Kolpino)
99	MF	RUS	Danil Polyakh (from Arsenal Tula)

Out: Note: Flags indicate national team as defined under FIFA eligibility rules; some limited exceptions apply. Players may hold more than one non-FIFA nationality.

No.	Pos.	Nation	Player
3	DF	CMR	Ambroise Oyongo (end of loan from (France) Montpellier, loan started 22 February)
6	DF	ECU	Cristian Ramírez (removed from registered squad due to injury)
25	FW	RUS	Ilya Khatuntsev (to Zenit St. Petersburg)
46	DF	RUS	Sergei Novikov
61	DF	RUS	Ilya Martynov (on loan to Tambov)
66	GK	RUS	Denis Adamov (to Sochi)
86	DF	RUS	Mikhail Sukhoruchenko
87	FW	RUS	Anatoli Katrich (to Tekstilshchik Ivanovo)
88	GK	RUS	Andrei Sinitsyn (to Akron Tolyatti)
97	FW	RUS	Ruslan Pidlisnyak (to Mashuk-KMV Pyatigorsk)
—	DF	RUS	Leo Goglichidze (on loan to Nizhny Novgorod, previously from Chayka Peschanokopskoye)
—	DF	RUS	Yevgeni Nazarov (on loan to SKA-Khabarovsk, previously on loan to (Czech Republic) Teplice)
—	FW	RUS	German Onugkha (on loan to (Denmark) Vejle, previously on loan to Tambov)

=== Lokomotiv Moscow ===
In: Note: Flags indicate national team as defined under FIFA eligibility rules; some limited exceptions apply. Players may hold more than one non-FIFA nationality.

No.	Pos.	Nation	Player
3	DF	BRA	Pablo (from (France) Bordeaux)
41	MF	RUS	Daniil Kotelnikov
44	MF	RUS	Ilya Vinnikov (from own academy)
50	MF	RUS	Vladimir Marukhin
67	FW	RUS	Roman Kolmakov (from own academy)
70	DF	RUS	Nikita Zhuravlyov
79	MF	RUS	Kirill Nikishin (from own academy)
83	FW	RUS	Denis Valter (from own academy)
90	MF	RUS	Yegor Pogostnov (from own academy)
99	DF	RUS	Marat Bokoyev (from Krasny)

Out: Note: Flags indicate national team as defined under FIFA eligibility rules; some limited exceptions apply. Players may hold more than one non-FIFA nationality.

No.	Pos.	Nation	Player
23	MF	RUS	Ilya Berkovski (on loan to Nizhny Novgorod, previously from Torpedo Moscow)
32	MF	RUS	Georgi Makhatadze (to Rostov)
41	DF	SRB	Slobodan Rajković
50	MF	RUS	Denis Faizullin (on loan to Tom Tomsk)
79	DF	RUS	Aleksandr Mukhin (to Rostov)
89	GK	RUS	Amin Ramazanov
90	FW	RUS	Maksim Turishchev (to Rostov)
99	DF	RUS	German Osnov (to Krasnodar)
—	MF	UZB	Jasurbek Jaloliddinov (to (Uzbekistan) Andijon, previously on loan to Tambov)
—	MF	RUS	Andrey Nikitin (on loan to Fakel Voronezh, previously from Fakel)
—	MF	RUS	Roman Tugarev (to Rostov, previously on loan)

=== Rostov ===
In: Note: Flags indicate national team as defined under FIFA eligibility rules; some limited exceptions apply. Players may hold more than one non-FIFA nationality.

No.	Pos.	Nation	Player
3	DF	RUS	Tomas Rukas (from Yenisey Krasnoyarsk)
20	FW	GAM	Ali Sowe (on loan from (Bulgaria) CSKA Sofia)
21	MF	RUS	Georgi Makhatadze (from Lokomotiv Moscow)
23	MF	RUS	Roman Tugarev (from Lokomotiv Moscow, previously on loan)
25	MF	RUS	Kirill Folmer (from Ufa)
26	MF	RUS	Aleksandr Saplinov (end of loan to Rotor Volgograd)
29	DF	RUS	Aleksandr Mukhin (from Lokomotiv Moscow)
46	GK	RUS	Aleksandr Dyachkov (from UOR-5 Yegoryevsk)
53	MF	RUS	Alan Gioyev (free agent, last with Krasnodar)
59	FW	RUS	Aleksandr Fuks
63	FW	RUS	Lev Popov
68	GK	RUS	Ruslan Murtazov (from Alania Vladikavkaz)
73	MF	RUS	Daniil Sokolov (on loan from Leningradets)
89	FW	RUS	Artyom Ntumba Muamba (free agent, last at Ural Yekaterinburg)
90	FW	RUS	Maksim Turishchev (from Lokomotiv Moscow)
92	MF	RUS	Viktor Melyokhin (from Rodina Moscow academy)
—	MF	RUS	Kirill Moiseyev (from Torpedo Vladimir)

Out: Note: Flags indicate national team as defined under FIFA eligibility rules; some limited exceptions apply. Players may hold more than one non-FIFA nationality.

No.	Pos.	Nation	Player
1	GK	RUS	Yegor Baburin (on loan to Krasnodar)
7	MF	FIN	Roman Eremenko
9	FW	MKD	David Toshevski (on loan to Tambov)
46	GK	RUS	Denis Popov (to (Latvia) Valmiera)
59	DF	RUS	Aleksandr Vodyanik (to Forte Taganrog)
83	FW	RUS	Artur Sokhiyev (on loan to Yessentuki)
—	DF	RUS	Konstantin Pliyev (to Ufa, previously on loan)
—	MF	RUS	Mikhail Osinov (to Mashuk-KMV Pyatigorsk, previously on loan to Nizhny Novgorod)
—	FW	RUS	Danila Proshlyakov (on loan to Veles Moscow, previously on loan to Torpedo Moscow)

=== Rotor Volgograd ===
In: Note: Flags indicate national team as defined under FIFA eligibility rules; some limited exceptions apply. Players may hold more than one non-FIFA nationality.

No.	Pos.	Nation	Player
10	FW	KAZ	Aleksey Shchotkin (from (Kazakhstan) Astana)
14	MF	BLR	Ivan Mayewski (from (Kazakhstan) Astana)
21	MF	GEO	Giorgi Arabidze (on loan from (Portugal) Nacional)
22	GK	RUS	Igor Obukhov (from SKA-Khabarovsk)
62	DF	RUS	Yegor Rudykin
63	DF	RUS	Gleb Shilnikov
65	MF	RUS	Sergei Bolotin
69	FW	RUS	Aleksandr Biryukov
70	DF	KAZ	Dmitri Shomko (from (Kazakhstan) Astana)
71	GK	RUS	Vasili Tuzhlov
73	MF	RUS	Maksim Kostyuk
74	MF	RUS	Semyon Kutsenko
76	MF	RUS	Vladimir Gosinkeyev (from Tambov)

Out: Note: Flags indicate national team as defined under FIFA eligibility rules; some limited exceptions apply. Players may hold more than one non-FIFA nationality.

No.	Pos.	Nation	Player
1	GK	RUS	Aleksandr Dovbnya (to Torpedo Moscow)
3	DF	ARM	Armen Manucharyan (to (Kazakhstan) Aktobe)
6	DF	ARG	Patricio Matricardi (to (Romania) Hermannstadt)
9	FW	GEO	Beka Mikeltadze (to (Greece) Xanthi)
12	MF	RUS	Nikita Muromsky (to Dynamo Bryansk)
18	MF	RUS	Oleg Nikolayev (on loan to Volgar Astrakhan)
19	MF	RUS	Kirill Kolesnichenko (on loan to SKA-Khabarovsk)
24	DF	KAZ	Yuriy Logvinenko (released, previously from (Kazakhstan) Astana)
26	MF	RUS	Aleksandr Saplinov (end of loan from Rostov)
46	MF	RUS	Dmitri Sesyavin
73	MF	RUS	Viktor Zherebyatnikov (to Smolensk)
84	FW	RUS	Vasili Goloyadov (to Yessentuki)

=== Rubin Kazan ===
In: Note: Flags indicate national team as defined under FIFA eligibility rules; some limited exceptions apply. Players may hold more than one non-FIFA nationality.

No.	Pos.	Nation	Player
14	MF	RUS	Mikhail Kostyukov (from Tambov)
27	DF	RUS	Aleksei Gritsayenko (from Tambov)
38	MF	RUS	Leon Musayev (from Zenit St. Petersburg)
41	DF	RUS	Mikhail Smolyakov (from Tambov)
43	FW	RUS	Ivan Sergeyev (from Khimki)
45	MF	RUS	Grisha Melikyan
62	GK	RUS	Vladislav Dolzhenko
71	GK	RUS	Matvey Tyurin (from own academy)
76	MF	RUS	Nikita Makarov (end of loan to Veles Moscow)
78	MF	RUS	Ilkham Yarullin
79	DF	RUS	Abu-Muslim Khamkhoyev (from own academy)
—	MF	JPN	Mitsuki Saito (on loan from (Japan) Shonan Bellmare)

Out: Note: Flags indicate national team as defined under FIFA eligibility rules; some limited exceptions apply. Players may hold more than one non-FIFA nationality.

No.	Pos.	Nation	Player
10	MF	RUS	Igor Konovalov (on loan to Arsenal Tula)
13	FW	RUS	Kirill Klimov (on loan to Tambov)
15	MF	RUS	Dmitri Tarasov
23	GK	RUS	Ivan Konovalov (on loan to Ural Yekaterinburg)
47	FW	RUS	Kirill Kosarev (on loan to Tom Tomsk)
49	FW	RUS	Danila Strelchuk (to Arsenal Tula)
82	DF	RUS	Viktor Aleksandrov (on loan to (Latvia) Valmiera)
96	DF	RUS	Danila Karyagin (to Zvezda Perm)
—	GK	RUS	Aleksei Gorodovoy (on loan to SKA-Khabarovsk, previously on loan to Veles Moscow)
—	DF	UKR	Oleh Danchenko (to (Greece) AEK Athens, previously on loan to Ufa)
—	FW	RUS	Artur Sagitov (released, previously on loan to Volgar Astrakhan)

=== Sochi ===
In: Note: Flags indicate national team as defined under FIFA eligibility rules; some limited exceptions apply. Players may hold more than one non-FIFA nationality.

No.	Pos.	Nation	Player
1	GK	RUS	Denis Adamov (from Krasnodar)
43	DF	RUS	Denis Kalmykov (from Strogino Moscow academy)
46	MF	RUS	Vladislav Strukov
48	MF	RUS	Arkadi Solop (from Tambov)
58	MF	RUS	Aleksei Mikhaylov (from Rostov academy)
61	GK	RUS	Denis Terekhov
69	MF	RUS	Kirill Chursin
72	FW	RUS	Marat Tarek
74	MF	RUS	Maksim Ilyin (from Ufa)
76	FW	RUS	Denis Rubanov
78	DF	RUS	Yevgeni Antonov
82	GK	RUS	Nikita Shevchenko
87	DF	RUS	Danila Prokhin (on loan from Zenit St. Petersburg)

Out: Note: Flags indicate national team as defined under FIFA eligibility rules; some limited exceptions apply. Players may hold more than one non-FIFA nationality.

No.	Pos.	Nation	Player
8	MF	RUS	Nikita Koldunov (on loan to Zenit St. Petersburg)
21	MF	KAZ	Akmal Bakhtiyarov (to (Kazakhstan) Zhetysu)
26	DF	RUS	Nikita Kalugin (to Neftekhimik Nizhnekamsk)
43	DF	RUS	Fyodor Khudenko
46	MF	RUS	Timofey Shipunov (to UOR #5 Yegoryevsk)
48	DF	RUS	Siyovush Khabibulloyev (to Krasnodar)
54	MF	RUS	Anatoli Nemchenko (on loan to Olimp-Dolgoprudny)
58	MF	RUS	Andrei Bokovoy (to Veles Moscow)
61	GK	RUS	Aleksandr Dyachenko
62	MF	NGA	Philip Ipole (to (Kazakhstan) Zhetysu)
69	MF	RUS	Khasan Tashayev (to Strogino Moscow)
72	FW	RUS	Daniil Batishchev
74	FW	RUS	Vladislav Makeyev
76	MF	RUS	Daniil Martovoy
78	FW	RUS	Nikita Kozlov
—	FW	RUS	Viktor Morozov (to Chayka Peschanokopskoye, previously on loan to Olimp-Dolgoprudny)

=== Spartak Moscow ===
In: Note: Flags indicate national team as defined under FIFA eligibility rules; some limited exceptions apply. Players may hold more than one non-FIFA nationality.

No.	Pos.	Nation	Player
4	MF	NED	Jorrit Hendrix (from (Netherlands) PSV)
24	MF	NED	Quincy Promes (from (Netherlands) Ajax)
42	GK	RUS	Nikolai Smirnov
70	FW	RUS	Pavel Melyoshin
87	MF	RUS	Ayaz Guliyev (previously not registered on the squad)

Out: Note: Flags indicate national team as defined under FIFA eligibility rules; some limited exceptions apply. Players may hold more than one non-FIFA nationality.

No.	Pos.	Nation	Player
9	FW	RUS	Aleksandr Kokorin (to (Italy) Fiorentina)
15	MF	RUS	Maksim Glushenkov (on loan to Khimki)
20	MF	UZB	Oston Urunov (on loan to Ufa)
21	DF	GER	Malcolm Badu
42	MF	RUS	Vladislav Vasilyev (to (Armenia) Van)
55	DF	RUS	Vitali Dyakov
66	FW	LBR	Sylvanus Nimely (to (Croatia) Gorica)
67	DF	RUS	Maksim Sazonov (to Metallurg Lipetsk)
78	MF	RUS	Maksim Danilin (on loan to (Armenia) Noah)
87	FW	RUS	Svyatoslav Kozhedub (to loan to (Latvia) Valmiera)
99	FW	BRA	Pedro Rocha (to Spartak-2 Moscow, previously on loan to (Brazil) Flamengo)

=== Tambov ===
In: Note: Flags indicate national team as defined under FIFA eligibility rules; some limited exceptions apply. Players may hold more than one non-FIFA nationality.

No.	Pos.	Nation	Player
2	DF	RUS	Moris Nusuev (from (Georgia (country)) Merani Tbilisi)
3	DF	RUS	Aleksandr Denisov (on loan from Arsenal Tula)
4	MF	MDA	Cătălin Carp (from Ufa)
5	MF	RUS	Aleksandr Yerkin (from (Latvia) Noah Jūrmala)
7	MF	RUS	Azer Aliyev (from Ufa)
8	MF	BLR	Dmitry German (from (Latvia) Noah Jūrmala)
9	FW	RUS	Artyom Arkhipov (on loan from Kuban Krasnodar, previously to Kuban, previously on loan to (Belarus) Shakhtyor Soligorsk)
10	MF	RUS	Yevgeni Chabanov (on loan from Kuban Krasnodar)
14	MF	RUS	Yuri Bavin (on loan from Ural Yekaterinburg)
18	FW	RUS	Kirill Klimov (on loan from Rubin Kazan)
19	MF	RUS	Anton Terekhov (on loan from Dynamo Moscow)
23	MF	RUS	Vladislav Karapuzov (on loan from Dynamo Moscow)
24	DF	RUS	Denis Kaykov (on loan from Neftekhimik Nizhnekamsk)
26	DF	TJK	Farkhod Vosiyev (free agent, last with Neftekhimik Nizhnekamsk)
27	MF	RUS	Eddi Tsanava
28	MF	RUS	Nikita Vasilyev (from Zenit St. Petersburg academy)
30	GK	BLR	Rodion Syamuk (from (Belarus) Torpedo-BelAZ Zhodino)
31	MF	RUS	Nikita Drozdov (from Fakel Voronezh)
32	GK	RUS	Ilya Korablyov
36	DF	RUS	Maksim Getsold
37	FW	RUS	Roman Minayev (on loan from Arsenal Tula)
47	DF	RUS	Aleksandr Pavliy
51	MF	RUS	Aleksandr Strukov
55	DF	RUS	Ilya Martynov (on loan from Krasnodar)
57	DF	RUS	Valentin Prilepin (from Volga Ulyanovsk)
61	DF	RUS	Kirill Kozyavkin
74	MF	RUS	Timofey Kostenko (free agent, last with Sochi)
76	MF	RUS	Daniil Zhitlov
77	MF	RUS	Said-Ali Akhmayev (free agent, last with Ararat Moscow)
87	MF	RUS	Tigran Avanesyan (on loan from CSKA Moscow)
88	GK	RUS	Roman Danilov (free agent, last with Inter Cherkessk)
91	DF	RUS	Grigori Gvardeyev (from Torpedo Moscow)
99	FW	MKD	David Toshevski (on loan from Rostov)

Out: Note: Flags indicate national team as defined under FIFA eligibility rules; some limited exceptions apply. Players may hold more than one non-FIFA nationality.

No.	Pos.	Nation	Player
1	GK	RUS	Sergey Ryzhikov
2	DF	RUS	Aleksei Rybin (to Kuban Krasnodar)
3	MF	RUS	Guram Tetrashvili (to (Kazakhstan) Okzhetpes)
5	DF	RUS	Yevgeni Shlyakov (to (Romania) UTA Arad)
7	MF	UZB	Jasurbek Jaloliddinov (end of loan from Lokomotiv Moscow)
8	MF	RUS	Anton Kilin (to Akron Tolyatti)
9	FW	RUS	German Onugkha (end of loan from Krasnodar)
11	DF	BLR	Maksim Valadzko (to (Belarus) BATE Borisov)
11	FW	RUS	Said Aliyev (to Krymteplytsia Molodizhne, previously from Veles Moscow)
15	MF	RUS	Arsen Kabolov
18	DF	ARM	Varazdat Haroyan (to (Kazakhstan) Astana)
19	MF	GHA	Mohammed Rabiu
23	MF	RUS	Vladimir Gosinkeyev (to Rotor Volgograd)
25	MF	RUS	Pavel Karasyov (to (Belarus) BATE Borisov)
27	DF	RUS	Aleksei Gritsayenko (to Rubin Kazan)
29	DF	UKR	Oleksandr Kapliyenko (to Torpedo Moscow)
30	DF	RUS	Soslan Takazov (to Kuban Krasnodar)
31	MF	LUX	Sébastien Thill (end of loan from (Luxembourg) Progrès Niederkorn)
32	DF	RUS	Aleksandr Yevtin
36	MF	RUS	Denis Skrypnikov (to Krasnodar-3)
44	DF	RUS	Nikita Chicherin (to Akron Tolyatti)
48	DF	RUS	Andrei Komov
53	GK	RUS	Maksim Mikhalyov
57	GK	RUS	Nikita Kotov (to Nosta Novotroitsk)
58	DF	RUS	Adessoye Oyewole (on loan to Orenburg)
68	MF	RUS	Aleksandr Malin
69	DF	RUS	Dmitri Ignatenko
70	MF	RUS	Georgi Mdzeluri
72	DF	RUS	Mikhail Smolyakov (to Rubin Kazan)
73	GK	RUS	Nikita Chagrov
75	DF	RUS	Oleg Bulatnikov
77	MF	RUS	Mikhail Kostyukov (to Rubin Kazan)
78	DF	RUS	Ivan Bzikadze
79	MF	RUS	Yegor Tsvetkov
87	FW	ARM	Aleksandre Karapetian (to Ararat-Armenia)
88	MF	RUS	Arkadi Solop (to Sochi)
90	FW	RUS	Dmitri Merenchukov (to Rodina Moscow)
92	MF	MDA	Valeriu Ciupercă (to (Kazakhstan) Astana)
96	DF	RUS	Ilya Mamkin (to Fakel-M Voronezh)
99	MF	RUS	Artyom Doronin
—	MF	RUS	Artyom Fedchuk (to Veles Moscow, previously on loan to Nizhny Novgorod)
—	MF	RUS	Sergei Arkhipov (to Kuban Krasnodar, previously on loan to (Belarus) Gorodeya)
—	MF	RUS	Oleg Chernyshov (to (Kazakhstan) Aktobe, previously on loan)
—	FW	RUS	Andrei Chasovskikh (to Kuban Krasnodar, previously on loan to (Kazakhstan) Aktobe)

=== Ufa ===
In: Note: Flags indicate national team as defined under FIFA eligibility rules; some limited exceptions apply. Players may hold more than one non-FIFA nationality.

No.	Pos.	Nation	Player
8	MF	BDI	Parfait Bizoza (from (Norway) Aalesunds)
10	MF	UZB	Oston Urunov (on loan from Spartak Moscow)
11	DF	SRB	Nemanja Miletić (from (Cyprus) Olympiakos Nicosia)
15	DF	RUS	Konstantin Pliyev (from Rostov, previously on loan)
19	MF	RUS	Oleg Ivanov (from Akhmat Grozny)
27	DF	RUS	Oleg Dzantiyev (from Olimp-Dolgoprudny)
32	DF	AUT	Moritz Bauer (on loan from (England) Stoke City)
63	MF	RUS	Sergei Sandakov
67	FW	RUS	Dmitri Prokofyev
69	MF	RUS	Khaydar Khalilov
76	MF	RUS	Oskar Bashirov
81	GK	RUS	Ivan Kukushkin (from Zenit St. Petersburg)
90	GK	RUS	Dinar Sharafutdinov
91	GK	RUS	Roman Kalinin
94	MF	RUS	Danil Akhatov
98	FW	RUS	Kirill Tomashev

Out: Note: Flags indicate national team as defined under FIFA eligibility rules; some limited exceptions apply. Players may hold more than one non-FIFA nationality.

No.	Pos.	Nation	Player
8	DF	MDA	Cătălin Carp (to Tambov)
9	MF	RUS	Kirill Folmer (to Rostov)
11	FW	SVN	Lovro Bizjak (to (Moldova) Sheriff Tiraspol)
19	FW	RUS	Gamid Agalarov (on loan to Volgar Astrakhan)
44	DF	RUS	Sergei Borodin (end of loan from Krasnodar)
63	DF	RUS	Maksim Ilyin (to Sochi)
76	DF	RUS	Ilya Vydrin
77	MF	RUS	Azer Aliyev (to Tambov)
89	FW	RUS	Denis Timofeyev
94	DF	UKR	Oleh Danchenko (end of loan from Rubin Kazan)
99	MF	UKR	Akhmed Alibekov (end of loan from (Ukraine) Dynamo Kyiv)

=== Ural Yekaterinburg ===
In: Note: Flags indicate national team as defined under FIFA eligibility rules; some limited exceptions apply. Players may hold more than one non-FIFA nationality.

No.	Pos.	Nation	Player
17	FW	KOS	Ylldren Ibrahimaj (from (Norway) Viking)
22	DF	RUS	Arsen Adamov (from Akhmat Grozny)
28	GK	RUS	Ivan Konovalov (on loan from Rubin Kazan)
39	DF	RUS	Aleksandr Pukhayev
40	MF	RUS	Ramazan Gadzhimuradov (from SKA-Khabarovsk)
55	FW	RUS	Artyom Maksimenko (from Veles Moscow)
67	MF	RUS	Pavel Makarov (free agent, last with CSKA Moscow academy)
73	MF	RUS	Sergei Alekseyev (from Zenit Irkutsk)
77	GK	RUS	Oleg Baklov (return from injury)
87	MF	RUS	Igor Druzhinin (from Zenit Irkutsk)
88	FW	RUS	Daniil Smolnikov
89	MF	RUS	Kirill Gerasimov
98	DF	RUS	Islamzhan Nasyrov (end of loan to Orenburg)

Out: Note: Flags indicate national team as defined under FIFA eligibility rules; some limited exceptions apply. Players may hold more than one non-FIFA nationality.

No.	Pos.	Nation	Player
1	GK	RUS	Ilya Pomazun (end of loan from CSKA Moscow)
2	DF	RUS	Shamsiddin Shanbiyev (to (Belarus) Isloch Minsk Raion)
7	FW	RUS	David Karayev (to (Kazakhstan) Caspiy)
11	MF	RUS	Dmitry Yefremov (to Krylia Sovetov Samara)
14	MF	RUS	Yuri Bavin (on loan to Tambov)
22	MF	RUS	Aykhan Guseynov (to Olimp-Dolgoprudny)
35	DF	BLR	Nikolay Zolotov (to (Ukraine) Kolos Kovalivka)
39	MF	RUS	Arseni Yermakov
40	GK	RUS	Danil Aboimov
46	MF	RUS	Aleksandr Nechayev
69	MF	RUS	Artyom Shabolin (on loan to Yenisey Krasnoyarsk)
73	MF	RUS	Artyom Parshukov
—	FW	RUS	Artyom Yusupov (on loan to Volgar Astrakhan, previously on loan to Orenburg)

=== Zenit Saint Petersburg ===
In: Note: Flags indicate national team as defined under FIFA eligibility rules; some limited exceptions apply. Players may hold more than one non-FIFA nationality.

No.	Pos.	Nation	Player
32	FW	RUS	Pavel Dolgov (from Tom Tomsk)
34	DF	RUS	Matvey Troshchenkov (from UOR-5 Yegoryevsk)
35	MF	RUS	Vladislav Saus (from UOR-5 Yegoryevsk)
38	DF	RUS	Ilya Khatuntsev (from Krasnodar)
43	DF	RUS	Artyom Kasimov (from own academy)
50	FW	RUS	Aleksandr Yemelyanov (from own academy)
63	MF	RUS	Nikita Koldunov (on loan from Sochi)
88	GK	RUS	Vladimir Pavlov (from own academy)
95	GK	RUS	Georgi Korolyov (from own academy)

Out: Note: Flags indicate national team as defined under FIFA eligibility rules; some limited exceptions apply. Players may hold more than one non-FIFA nationality.

No.	Pos.	Nation	Player
38	MF	RUS	Leon Musayev (to Rubin Kazan)
51	FW	RUS	Daniil Makeyev (to (Lithuania) Dainava)
61	GK	RUS	Ivan Kukushkin (to Ufa)
62	DF	RUS	Nikolai Tarasov (end of loan from Olimp-Dolgoprudny)
68	FW	RUS	Ivan Korshunov (on loan to Irtysh Omsk)
78	GK	RUS	Aleksandr Vasyutin (on loan to (Sweden) Djurgården)
84	DF	RUS	Viktor Kovrizhnikov
87	DF	RUS	Danila Prokhin (on loan to Sochi)
