= Vasiyev =

Vasiyev is a surname. Notable people with the surname include:

- Dilshod Vasiyev (born 1988), Tajikistani footballer
- Farkhod Vasiyev (born 1990), Tajikistani footballer
