= Yuri Drozdov (footballer) =

Russian footballer

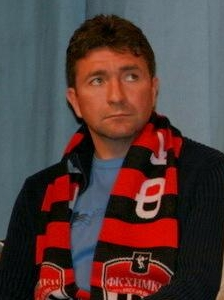
- Drozdov in 2008

Personal information
- Full name: Yuri Alekseyevich Drozdov
- Date of birth: 16 January 1972 (age 54)
- Place of birth: Pyatigorsk, USSR
- Height: 1.72 m (5 ft 8 in)
- Positions: Midfielder; defender

Senior career*
| Years | Team | Apps | (Gls) |
| 1988 | Mashuk Pyatigorsk | 2 | (0) |
| 1989 | EShVSM Moscow | 0 | (0) |
| 1990–1992 | Dynamo Moscow | 18 | (0) |
| 1993–2003 | Lokomotiv Moscow | 254 | (6) |
| 2003–2004 | Alania Vladikavkaz | 37 | (0) |
| 2005 | Zhenis Astana | 26 | (1) |
| 2006–2008 | FC Khimki | 56 | (1) |
| 2008 | Vityaz Podolsk | 2 | (0) |
| 2009 | Lokomotiv-2 Moscow | 18 | (0) |

International career
| 1991 | USSR U20 | 3 | (0) |
| 1992 | USSR U21 | 4 | (0) |
| 1992–1994 | Russia U21 | 12 | (1) |
| 1999–2001 | Russia | 10 | (0) |

Managerial career
- 2010–2011: Lokomotiv-2 Moscow (assistant)
- 2012: Sakhalin Yuzhno-Sakhalinsk
- 2013: Dzhileks Klimovsk
- 2013: Krasnodar-2
- 2014–2017: Spartak Nalchik (assistant)
- 2017–2018: Dinamo Minsk (assistant)
- 2019–2020: Sakhalin Yuzhno-Sakhalinsk
- 2020–2023: Sakhalinets Moscow
- 2023–2024: Sakhalin Yuzhno-Sakhalinsk
- * Club domestic league appearances and goals

Yuri Alekseyevich Drozdov (Russian: Юрий Алексеевич Дроздов; born 16 January 1972) is a Russian association football coach and a former player who spent most of his playing career at FC Lokomotiv Moscow.

== Career ==
Before Lokomotiv, Drozdov used to play for their city rivals FC Dynamo Moscow. Since leaving Lokomotiv in 2003, Drozdov has had short spells at FC Alania Vladikavkaz and FC Zhenis Astana, before joining the Russian First Division side FC Khimki, helping the club to promotion to the Russian Premier League in 2006.

== International ==
He was part of the USSR U-20 football team, which finished third in 1991 FIFA World Youth Championship.

== Personal life ==
He is the father of footballers Nikita Drozdov and Ilya Drozdov.
