= Yevgeni Chabanov =

Russian football player

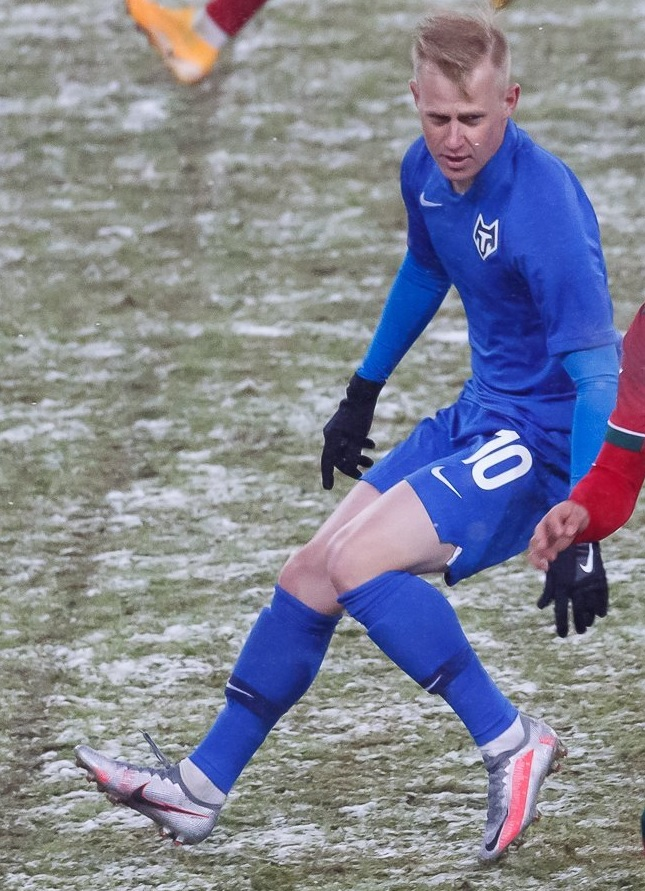
- Chabanov with FC Tambov in 2021

Personal information
- Full name: Yevgeni Aleksandrovich Chabanov
- Date of birth: 8 August 1997 (age 29)
- Place of birth: Komsomolsk-on-Amur, Russia
- Height: 1.75 m (5 ft 9 in)
- Position: Winger

Youth career
- 2006–2015: SDYuSShOR-4 Volzhsky

Senior career*
Years	Team	Apps	(Gls)
2015	FC Nika Moscow (amateur)		
2016–2019	FC Rotor Volgograd	13	(0)
2018–2019	→ FC Rotor-2 Volgograd	22	(6)
2019	FC Chernomorets Novorossiysk	18	(7)
2020–2021	FC Kuban Krasnodar	15	(3)
2021	→ FC Tambov (loan)	3	(0)
2021–2022	FC Amkar Perm	19	(2)
2022–2023	FC Mashuk-KMV Pyatigorsk	6	(0)
- * Club domestic league appearances and goals as of 13 November 2022

Yevgeni Aleksandrovich Chabanov (Russian: Евгений Александрович Чабанов; born 8 August 1997) is a Russian football player.

== Club career ==
He made his debut in the Russian Professional Football League for FC Rotor Volgograd on 28 July 2016 in a game against FC Mashuk-KMV Pyatigorsk.

He made his Russian Football National League debut for Rotor on 2 September 2017 in a game against FC Yenisey Krasnoyarsk.

He made his Russian Premier League debut for FC Tambov on 26 February 2021 in a game against FC Rotor Volgograd. He substituted Nikita Drozdov in the 69th minute of a 1–3 home loss.
