= Artyom Arkhipov =

Russian football player

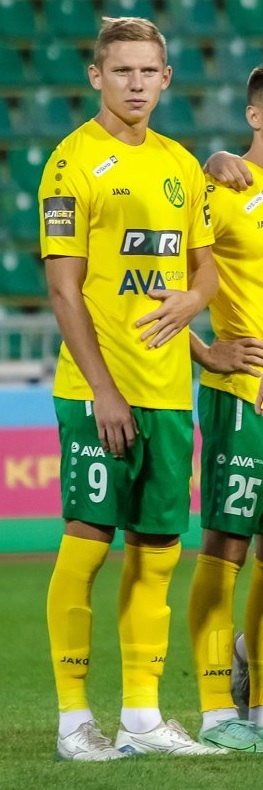
- Arkhipov with Kuban Krasnodar in 2022

Personal information
- Full name: Artyom Sergeyevich Arkhipov
- Date of birth: 15 December 1996 (age 29)
- Place of birth: Tambov, Russia
- Height: 1.87 m (6 ft 2 in)
- Position: Forward

Team information
- Current team: Spartak Tambov
- Number: 9

Youth career
- Academiya Futbola Tambov

Senior career*
Years	Team	Apps	(Gls)
2015–2020	Tambov	20	(1)
2016–2017	→ FC Tambov-M		
2017–2018	→ Saturn Ramenskoye (loan)	22	(4)
2018–2019	→ Zorky Krasnogorsk (loan)	20	(6)
2019–2020	→ Gorodeya (loan)	15	(8)
2020	→ Shakhtyor Soligorsk (loan)	14	(7)
2021–2023	Kuban Krasnodar	26	(3)
2021	→ Tambov (loan)	11	(3)
2021–2022	→ Akhmat Grozny (loan)	16	(0)
2023	Khimki	5	(0)
2023	→ Khimki-M	1	(0)
2024	Turan	20	(1)
2025	Alashkert	3	(0)
2025	Dnepr Mogilev	28	(7)
2026	Smorgon	4	(0)
2026–	Spartak Tambov	8	(1)
- * Club domestic league appearances and goals as of 31 October 2026

Artyom Sergeyevich Arkhipov (Russian: Артём Сергеевич Архипов; born 15 December 1996) is a Russian football player who plays as a striker for Spartak Tambov.

== Club career ==
He made his debut in the Russian Professional Football League for FC Tambov on 17 April 2015 in a game against FC Fakel Voronezh.

He made his Russian Premier League debut for FC Tambov on 26 February 2021 in a game against FC Rotor Volgograd. He started the game and scored the opening goal before his team lost 1–3.

On 23 June 2021, he joined Akhmat Grozny on loan for the 2020–21 season.

== Personal life ==
He is a twin brother of Sergei Arkhipov, who is also a professional footballer.

== Career statistics ==
As of 21 May 2022

Club	Season	League			Cup		Continental		Total	
Club	Season	Division	Apps	Goals	Apps	Goals	Apps	Goals	Apps	Goals
Tambov	2014–15	PFL	4	0	0	0	–		4	0
Tambov	2015–16	PFL	16	1	0	0	–		16	1
Saturn Ramenskoye	2017–18	PFL	22	4	2	0	–		24	4
Zorky Krasnogorsk	2018–19	PFL	20	6	2	0	–		22	6
Gorodeya	2019	BPL	13	8	–		–		13	8
Gorodeya	2020	BPL	2	0	–		–		2	0
Gorodeya	Total		15	8	0	0	0	0	15	8
Shakhtyor Soligorsk	2020	BPL	14	7	2	1	1 (Note: Appearance in the UEFA Europa League)	0	17	8
Tambov	2020–21	RPL	11	3	0	0	–		11	3
Tambov	Total (2 spells)		31	4	0	0	0	0	31	4
Akhmat Grozny	2021–22	RPL	16	0	2	0	–		18	0
Career total			118	29	8	1	1	0	127	30
