= Zurab Gigashvili =

Georgian footballer

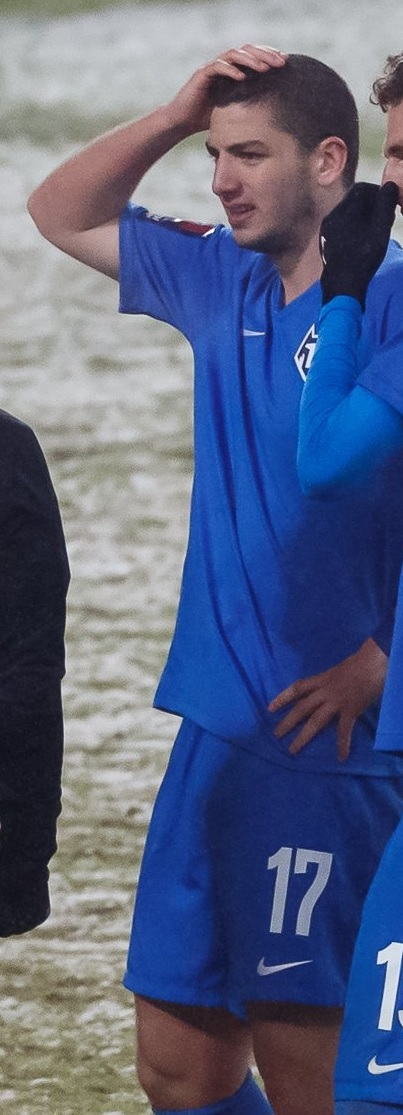
- Gigashvili with FC Tambov in 2021

Personal information
- Date of birth: 20 November 2001 (age 24)
- Place of birth: Tbilisi, Georgia
- Height: 1.89 m (6 ft 2 in)
- Position: Defender

Youth career
- Çayyoluspor
- 2015–2018: Ankaragücü

Senior career*
Years	Team	Apps	(Gls)
2020	Armavir	0	(0)
2020–2021	Tambov	8	(0)
2021–2022	Kryvbas Kryvyi Rih	0	(0)
2022–2023	Telavi	37	(0)
2023	Mladost DG	10	(0)
2024	Samtredia	24	(1)
2025	Kavala	3	(0)
- * Club domestic league appearances and goals as of 1 July 2025

Zurab Gigashvili (Georgian: ზურაბ გიგაშვილი; born 20 November 2001) is a Georgian professional football player.

== Club career ==
He made his debut in the Russian Premier League for FC Tambov on 5 December 2020 in a game against FC Spartak Moscow. He started the game and played a full match in a 1–5 away loss.
