= Moris Nusuyev =

Russian-British footballer

Moris Nusuev
Personal information
- Full name: Moris Shevalyevich Nusuev
- Date of birth: 28 July 1997 (age 29)
- Place of birth: Moscow, Russia
- Height: 1.93 m (6 ft 4 in)
- Position: Centre-back

Senior career*
Years	Team	Apps	(Gls)
2016–2017	MTK Budapest II	6	(0)
2018	Panathinaikos	0	(0)
2018	Celje	0	(0)
2019	Ilirija	2	(0)
2019–2020	WIT Georgia	4	(0)
2020–2021	Merani Tbilisi	7	(0)
2021	Tambov	2	(0)
2021	Kuban Krasnodar	0	(0)
2021	→ Znamya Truda (loan)	9	(0)
2022	Sioni Bolnisi	0	(0)
2022	Merani Tbilisi	17	(0)
2023	FC Telavi	1	(0)
2023	Merani Tbilisi	11	(0)
2023–2024	Ermis Aradippou	16	(0)
2024	Laçi	0	(0)
- * Club domestic league appearances and goals as of 21 December 2024

Moris Shevalyevich Nusuev (Russian: Морис Шевальевич Нусуев; born 28 July 1997) is a Russian professional footballer who plays as a centre-back.

== Club career ==
He made his debut in the Russian Premier League for Tambov on 19 March 2021 in a game against PFC Sochi.
