= Vladimir Kobakhidze =

Russian footballer

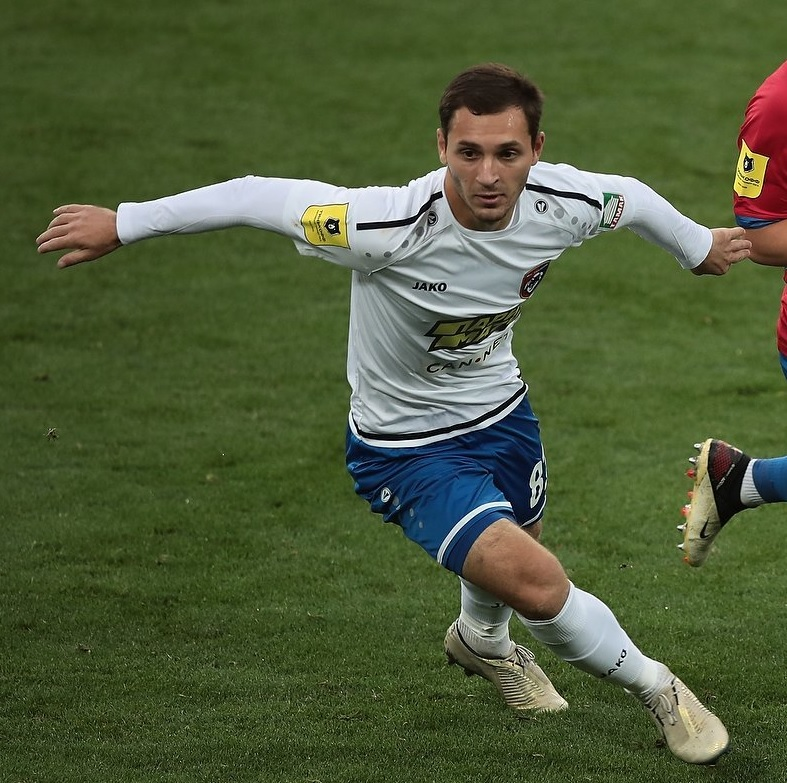
- Kobakhidze with Tambov in 2020

Personal information
- Full name: Vladimir Ivanovich Kobakhidze
- Date of birth: 9 September 1999 (age 27)
- Place of birth: Krasnodar, Russia
- Height: 1.75 m (5 ft 9 in)
- Position: Midfielder

Team information
- Current team: Talant

Youth career
- –2014: Krasnodar
- 2014–2017: CSKA Moscow
- 2017–2018: Arsenal Tula
- 2019–2020: Tambov

Senior career*
Years	Team	Apps	(Gls)
2018	Universport-Progress Krasnodar		
2020–2021	Tambov	21	(0)
2021–2024	Veles Moscow	102	(8)
2024	Sokol Saratov	3	(0)
2024–2025	Veles Moscow	28	(0)
2025–2026	Mashuk-KMV	2	(0)
2026–	Talant	0	(0)
- * Club domestic league appearances and goals as of 16 November 2025

Vladimir Ivanovich Kobakhidze (Russian: Владимир Иванович Кобахидзе; born 9 September 1999) is a Russian football player of Georgian descent who plays for Kyrgyz Premier League club Talant.

== Club career ==
He appeared for CSKA Moscow in the 2016–17 UEFA Youth League.

He made his debut in the Russian Premier League for Tambov on 21 June 2020 in a game against Ufa, replacing Vladimir Obukhov in the 56th minute.
