= Aleksey Rybin =

Russian footballer (born 1988)

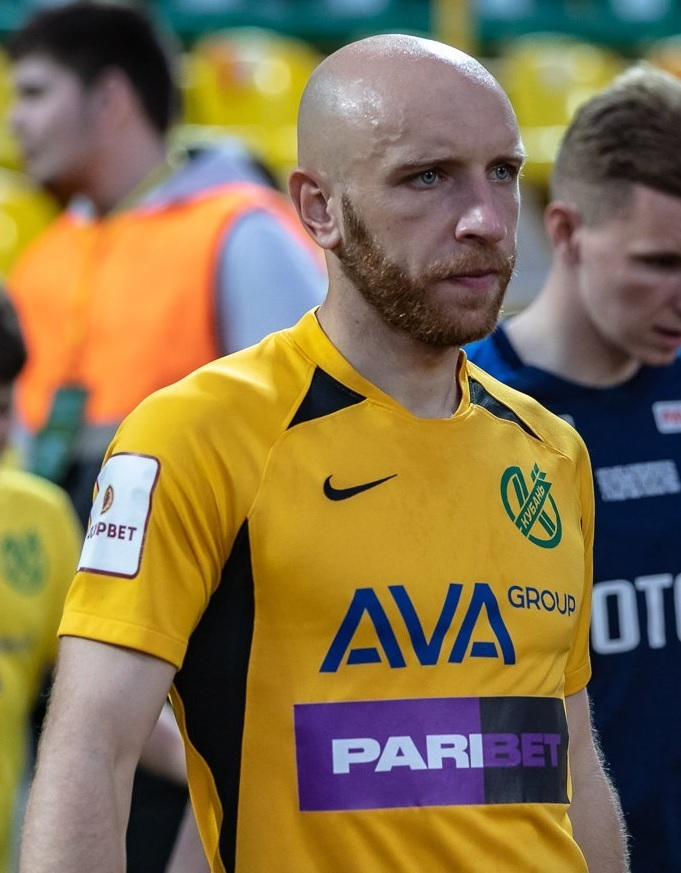
- Rybin with Kuban Krasnodar in 2022

Personal information
- Full name: Aleksey Vladimirovich Rybin
- Date of birth: 26 January 1988 (age 38)
- Place of birth: Lipetsk, Russian SFSR
- Height: 1.75 m (5 ft 9 in)
- Position: Right-back

Team information
- Current team: FC Metallurg Lipetsk (assistant coach)

Youth career
- FC Metallurg Lipetsk

Senior career*
Years	Team	Apps	(Gls)
2008–2014	FC Metallurg Lipetsk	144	(4)
2009	→ FC Dnepr Smolensk (loan)	12	(0)
2015–2020	FC Tambov	166	(6)
2021–2023	Kuban Krasnodar	58	(2)
2023–2024	FC Metallurg Lipetsk	22	(0)

Managerial career
- 2025–: FC Metallurg Lipetsk (assistant)
- * Club domestic league appearances and goals

Aleksey Vladimirovich Rybin (Russian: Алексей Владимирович Рыбин; born 26 January 1988) is a Russian professional football coach and a former player. He is an assistant coach with FC Metallurg Lipetsk.

== Club career ==
He made his Russian Premier League debut for FC Tambov on 17 August 2019 in a game against FC Krasnodar, as a starter.
