= Kirill Klimov =

Russian footballer (born 2001)

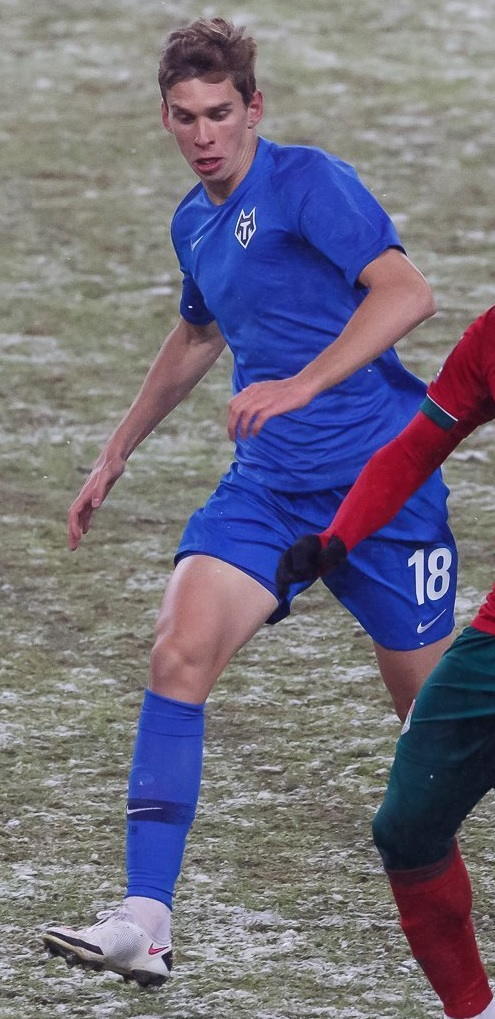
- Klimov with FC Tambov in 2021

Personal information
- Full name: Kirill Valeryevich Klimov
- Date of birth: 30 January 2001 (age 25)
- Place of birth: Oryol, Russia
- Height: 1.91 m (6 ft 3 in)
- Position: Forward

Team information
- Current team: União de Santarém
- Number: 22

Youth career
- –2013: DYuSSh-3 Oryol
- 2012–2015: Dynamo Moscow
- 2015–2019: Lokomotiv Moscow
- 2019: Cercle Brugge II
- 2019–2020: Monaco B

Senior career*
Years	Team	Apps	(Gls)
2020–2022	Rubin Kazan	4	(0)
2021	→ Tambov (loan)	11	(1)
2021	→ Kuban Krasnodar (loan)	17	(0)
2022–2024	SKA-Khabarovsk	5	(0)
2022–2024	SKA-Khabarovsk-2	14	(3)
2023	→ Chayka Peschanokopskoye (loan)	10	(3)
2024–2025	Kolkheti-1913 Poti	48	(10)
2025–2026	Feirense	21	(0)
2026–	União de Santarém	4	(0)

International career^{‡}
2016	Russia U-15	4	(0)
2016	Russia U-16	3	(5)
2017	Russia U-17	6	(5)
2018	Russia U-18	5	(0)
2019	Russia U-20	3	(0)
2021	Russia U-21	4	(0)
- * Club domestic league appearances and goals as of 12 September 2026 ‡ National team caps and goals as of 7 September 2021

Kirill Valeryevich Klimov (Russian: Кирилл Валерьевич Климов; born 30 January 2001) is a Russian football player who plays for Portuguese Liga 3 club União de Santarém.

== Club career ==
He played for Lokomotiv Moscow in the 2018–19 UEFA Youth League.

He made his debut in the Russian Premier League for Rubin Kazan on 22 November 2020 in a game against Rostov. He substituted Soltmurad Bakayev in the 84th minute.

On 20 February 2021, he was loaned to Tambov until the end of the 2020–21 season. He scored his first RPL goal for Tambov on the closing day of the season on 16 May 2021 against Zenit Saint Petersburg.

In December 2021, he returned to Rubin from a loan at Kuban Krasnodar.

== Personal life ==
His father Valeri Klimov is a football coach and former player.

== Career statistics ==
As of 21 May 2022

Club	Season	League			Cup		Continental		Total	
Club	Season	Division	Apps	Goals	Apps	Goals	Apps	Goals	Apps	Goals
Monaco II	2020–21	National 2	0	0	–		–		0	0
Rubin Kazan	2020–21	RPL	3	0	1	0	–		4	0
Rubin Kazan	2021–22	RPL	1	0	0	0	–		1	0
Rubin Kazan	Total		4	0	1	0	0	0	5	0
Tambov (loan)	2020–21	RPL	11	1	1	0	–		12	1
Kuban Krasnodar (loan)	2021–22	FNL	17	0	3	0	–		20	0
Career total			32	1	5	0	0	0	37	1
