= Sergei Arkhipov =

Russian football player

Personal information
- Full name: Sergei Sergeyevich Arkhipov
- Date of birth: 15 December 1996 (age 29)
- Place of birth: Tambov, Russia
- Height: 1.86 m (6 ft 1 in)
- Position: Forward

Youth career
- 2013: FC Pritambovye Tambov
- 2014: FC Akademiya Futbola Tambov Oblast
- 2015–2017: Tambov

Senior career*
Years	Team	Apps	(Gls)
2018–2020	Tambov	7	(1)
2018–2019	→ Zorky Krasnogorsk (loan)	25	(6)
2019	→ Metallurg Lipetsk (loan)	10	(4)
2020	→ Gorodeya (loan)	22	(7)
2021–2022	Kuban Krasnodar	12	(2)
2021	→ Saransk (loan)	14	(5)
2022–2023	Spartak Tambov	27	(5)
2023	Druzhba Maykop	18	(1)
2024	Baranovichi	11	(1)
- * Club domestic league appearances and goals as of 6 July 2024

Sergei Sergeyevich Arkhipov (Russian: Сергей Сергеевич Архипов; born 15 December 1996) is a Russian football player.

== Club career ==
He made his debut in the Russian Football National League for FC Tambov on 4 March 2018 in a game against FC Rotor Volgograd.

== Personal life ==
He is a twin brother of Artyom Arkhipov, who is also a professional footballer.
