= Farkhod Vasiyev =

Tajik footballer (born 1990)

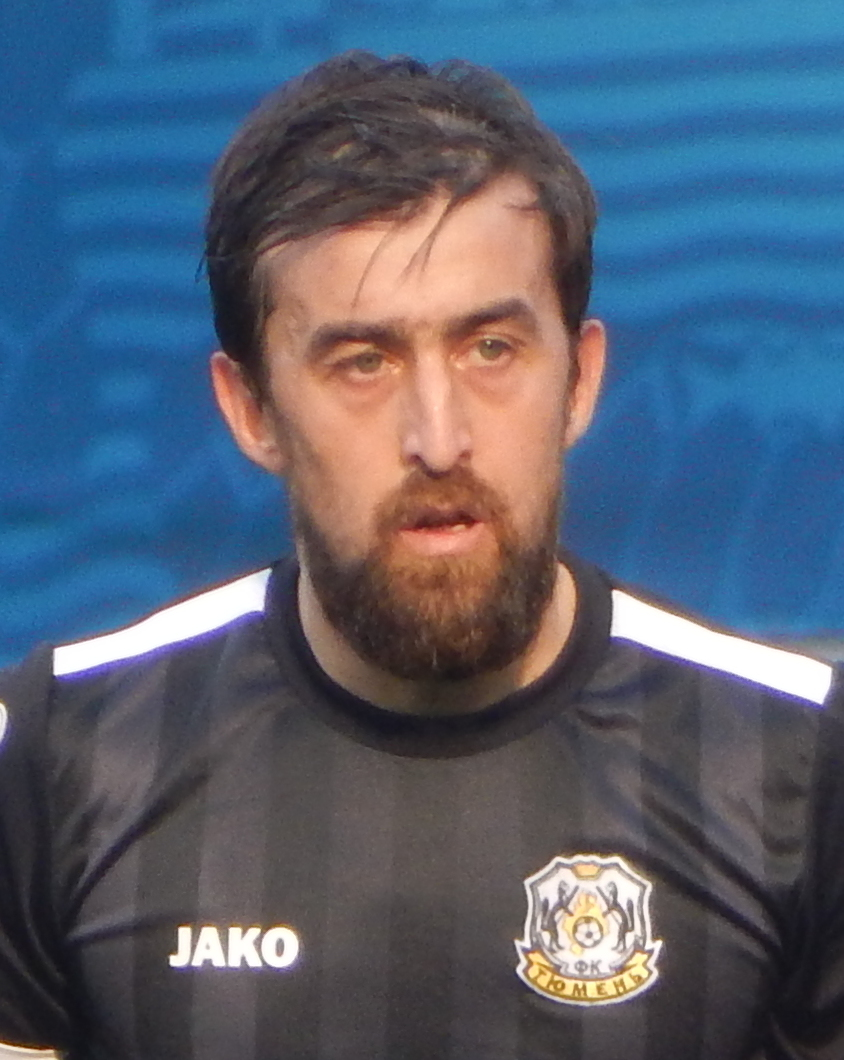
- Vasiyev with Tyumen in 2019

Personal information
- Full name: Farkhod Saidzhonovich Vasiyev
- Date of birth: 14 April 1990 (age 36)
- Place of birth: Dushanbe, Tajik SSR, Soviet Union
- Height: 1.80 m (5 ft 11 in)
- Position: Left-back

Senior career*
Years	Team	Apps	(Gls)
2005–2006	CSKA Dushanbe	17	(2)
2007–2010	Saturn Moscow Oblast	1	(1)
2010	→ Krylia Sovetov Samara (loan)	3	(0)
2011	Zhemchuzhina-Sochi	13	(0)
2011–2013	Shinnik Yaroslavl	34	(0)
2013	Volgar Astrakhan	11	(0)
2013–2018	Orenburg	61	(0)
2017	→ Istiklol (loan)	5	(1)
2018–2019	Tyumen	28	(1)
2019–2020	Neftekhimik Nizhnekamsk	3	(0)
2021	Tambov	9	(0)

International career
2007	Tajikistan U-17		
2007–2019	Tajikistan	14	(1)
- * Club domestic league appearances and goals as of 16 May 2021

Farkhod Saidzhonovich Vasiyev (Russian: Фарход Саиджонович Васиев; born 14 April 1990) is a Tajik professional footballer who plays as a left-back.

== Club career ==
In January 2010, Vasiyev went on trial with Krylia Sovetov.

On 2 March 2017, FC Istiklol announced that they had signed Vasiyev on loan from FC Orenburg, until the summer of 2017.

== International career ==
After being sent off in Tajikistan's 2–2 draw against Kyrgyzstan in the 2018 FIFA World Cup qualifiers on 8 October 2015, Vasiyev was subsequently banned for four matches, meaning he would miss Tajikistan's remaining qualifiers.

== Personal life ==
His brother, Dilshod is also a professional footballer.

== Career statistics ==
=== Club ===
As of match played 16 May 2021

Appearances and goals by club, season and competition
Club	Season	League			National cup		Continental		Other		Total	
Club	Season	Division	Apps	Goals	Apps	Goals	Apps	Goals	Apps	Goals	Apps	Goals
CSKA Dushanbe	2005	Tajik League	7	0			–		–		7	0
CSKA Dushanbe	2006	Tajik League	10	2			–		–		10	2
CSKA Dushanbe	Total		17	2			0	0	0	0	17	2
Saturn Ramenskoye	2009	Russian Premier League	1	1			–		–		1	1
Krylia Sovetov (loan)	2010	Russian Premier League	3	0			–		–		3	0
Zhemchuzhina-Sochi	2011–12	Russian Football National League	13	0			–		–		13	0
Shinnik Yaroslavl	2011–12	Russian Football National League	24	0			–		1	0	25	0
Shinnik Yaroslavl	2012–13	Russian Football National League	10	0			–		–		10	0
Shinnik Yaroslavl	Total		34	0			0	0	1	0	35	0
Volgar Astrakhan	2012–13	Russian Football National League	11	0	0	0	–		–		11	0
Gazovik Orenburg	2013–14	Russian Football National League	22	0	2	0	–		–		24	0
Gazovik Orenburg	2014–15	Russian Football National League	17	0	4	1	–		–		21	1
Gazovik Orenburg	2015–16	Russian Football National League	16	0	0	0	–		–		16	0
Gazovik Orenburg	2016–17	Russian Premier League	1	0	0	0	–		–		1	0
Gazovik Orenburg	2017–18	Russian Football National League	2	0	1	0	–		–		3	0
Gazovik Orenburg	Total		58	0	7	1	0	0	0	0	65	1
Istiklol (loan)	2017	Tajik League	5	1	0	0	3	0	0	0	8	1
Tyumen	2018–19	Russian Football National League	28	1	3	0	–		–		31	1
Neftekhimik Nizhnekamsk	2019–20	Russian Football National League	3	0	1	0	–		–		4	0
Tambov	2020–21	Russian Premier League	9	0	1	0	–		–		10	0
Career total			182	5	11	1	3	0	1	0	198	6

=== International ===
As of match played 19 November 2019

Appearances and goals by national team and year
National team	Year	Apps	Goals
Tajikistan	2007	3	0
Tajikistan	2008	0	0
Tajikistan	2009	0	0
Tajikistan	2010	0	0
Tajikistan	2011	3	0
Tajikistan	2012	1	0
Tajikistan	2013	1	0
Tajikistan	2014	0	0
Tajikistan	2015	3	1
Tajikistan	2016	1	0
Tajikistan	2017	0	0
Tajikistan	2018	0	0
Tajikistan	2019	2	1
Total		14	1

Scores and results list Tajikistan's goal tally first, score column indicates score after each Vasiyev goal.

List of international goals scored by Farkhod Vasiyev
No.	Date	Venue	Opponent	Score	Result	Competition
1	14 November 2019	Mandalarthiri Stadium, Mandalay, Myanmar	Myanmar	2–3	3–4	2022 FIFA World Cup qualification
