= Denis Kaykov =

Russian footballer

Personal information
- Full name: Denis Alekseyevich Kaykov
- Date of birth: 12 August 1997 (age 29)
- Place of birth: Moscow, Russia
- Height: 1.90 m (6 ft 3 in)
- Position: Defender

Team information
- Current team: FC Volna Nizhny Novgorod Oblast
- Number: 21

Youth career
- –2013: FC Torpedo Moscow
- 2013–2015: FC Lokomotiv-2 Moscow

Senior career*
Years	Team	Apps	(Gls)
2016–2018	FC Orenburg	0	(0)
2017–2018	→ FC Orenburg-2	19	(0)
2018–2019	FC Volga Ulyanovsk	22	(0)
2019–2021	FC Neftekhimik Nizhnekamsk	16	(0)
2021	→ FC Tambov (loan)	9	(1)
2021–2023	FC Amkar Perm	52	(1)
2024–2025	FC Kosmos Dolgoprudny	28	(2)
2025	FC Znamya Truda Orekhovo-Zuyevo	26	(1)
2026–	FC Volna Nizhny Novgorod Oblast	27	(3)
- * Club domestic league appearances and goals as of 31 October 2026

Denis Alekseyevich Kaykov (Russian: Денис Алексеевич Кайков; born 12 August 1997) is a Russian football player who plays for FC Volna Nizhny Novgorod Oblast.

== Club career ==
He made his debut in the Russian Professional Football League for FC Orenburg-2 on 27 July 2017 in a game against FC Chelyabinsk.

He made his Russian Football National League debut for FC Neftekhimik Nizhnekamsk on 13 July 2019 in a game against FC Nizhny Novgorod.

He made his Russian Premier League debut for FC Tambov on 7 March 2021 in a game against FC Dynamo Moscow.
