= Ilya Martynov =

Russian footballer

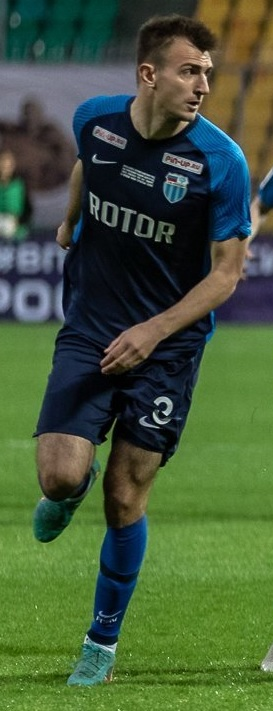
- Martynov with Rotor Volgograd in 2022

Personal information
- Full name: Ilya Vladimirovich Martynov
- Date of birth: 25 January 2000 (age 26)
- Place of birth: Rostov-on-Don, Russia
- Height: 1.85 m (6 ft 1 in)
- Position: Centre-back

Senior career*
Years	Team	Apps	(Gls)
2016–2022	FC Krasnodar	0	(0)
2018–2020	→ FC Krasnodar-2	50	(1)
2018–2020	→ FC Krasnodar-3	8	(0)
2021	→ FC Tambov (loan)	6	(0)
2021–2022	→ FC Rotor Volgograd (loan)	20	(1)
2021–2022	→ FC Rotor-2 Volgograd (loan)	2	(0)
2022–2023	FC Rotor Volgograd	9	(0)
2023	FC Leon Saturn Ramenskoye	9	(1)

International career^{‡}
2016	Russia U-16	3	(0)
2016–2017	Russia U-17	5	(1)
2016–2018	Russia U-18	5	(0)
2018	Russia U-19	9	(0)
2019	Russia U-20	2	(1)
- * Club domestic league appearances and goals as of 12 November 2023 ‡ National team caps and goals as of 13 June 2019

Ilya Vladimirovich Martynov (Russian: Илья Владимирович Мартынов; born 25 January 2000) is a Russian football player.

== Club career ==
He made his debut in the Russian Professional Football League for FC Krasnodar-2 on 16 May 2018 in a game against FC Afips Afipsky. He made his Russian Football National League debut for Krasnodar-2 on 22 July 2018 in a game against FC SKA-Khabarovsk.

He made his Russian Premier League debut for FC Tambov on 10 April 2021 against FC Khimki.

On 10 June 2021, he joined FC Rotor Volgograd on loan.
