= Anton Terekhov (footballer) =

Russian footballer

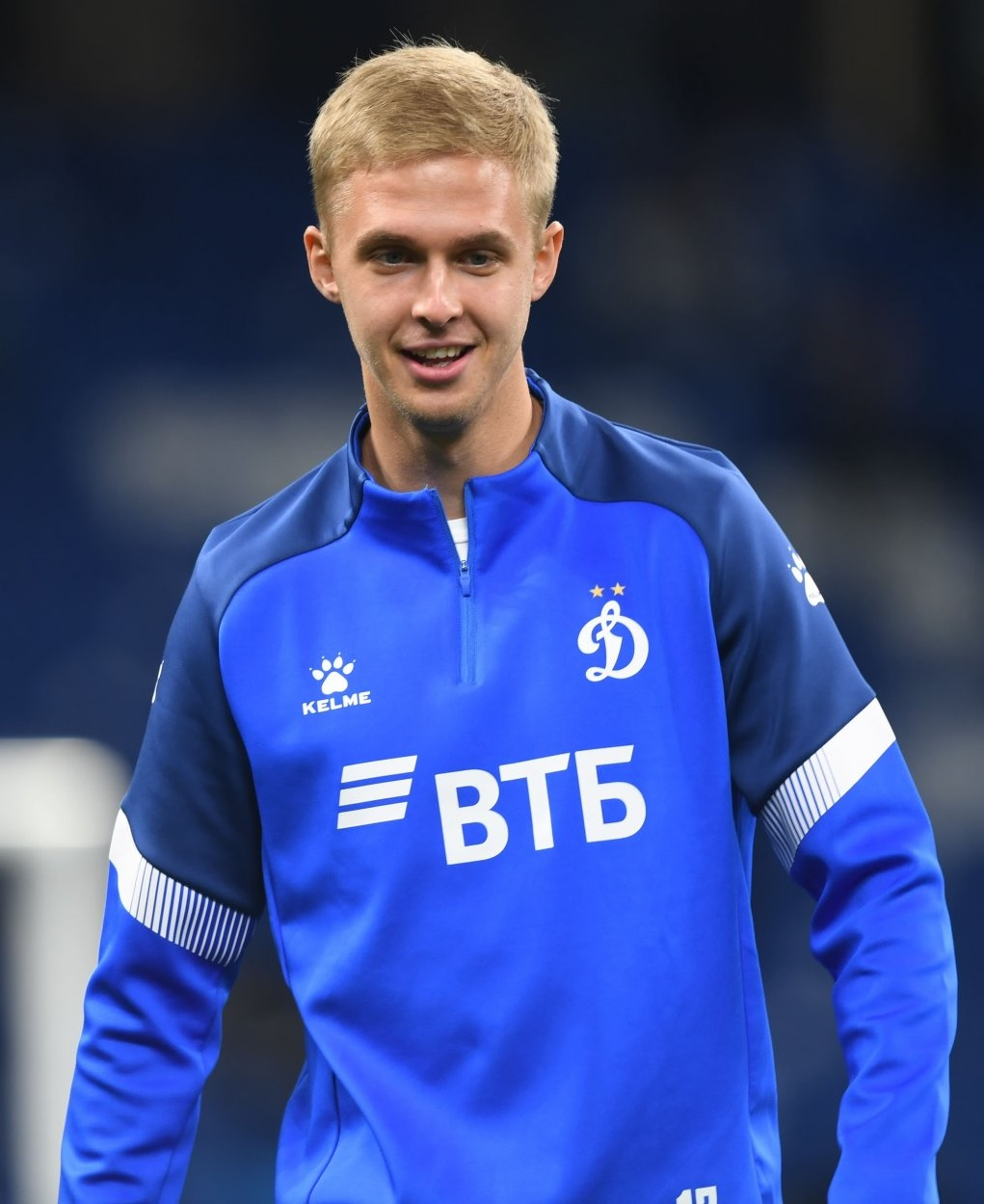
- Terekhov with Dynamo Moscow in 2020

Personal information
- Full name: Anton Andreyevich Terekhov
- Date of birth: 30 January 1998 (age 28)
- Place of birth: Surgut, Khanty-Mansiysk, Russia
- Height: 1.86 m (6 ft 1 in)
- Position: Forward

Youth career
- –2015: Dynamo Moscow

Senior career*
Years	Team	Apps	(Gls)
2015–2022	Dynamo Moscow	20	(1)
2016–2017	→ Dynamo-2 Moscow	6	(2)
2019–2020	→ Krylia Sovetov Samara (loan)	12	(0)
2020–2021	→ Dynamo-2 Moscow	2	(3)
2021	→ Tambov (loan)	11	(0)
2021–2022	→ Dynamo-2 Moscow	5	(2)
2022	Neftekhimik Nizhnekamsk	16	(1)
2023	Shinnik Yaroslavl	7	(0)
2023–2024	Chayka Peschanokopskoye	14	(2)
2024–2026	2DROTS Moscow	1	(1)

International career^{‡}
2012	Russia U15	2	(0)
2012–2014	Russia U16	20	(4)
2014–2015	Russia U17	19	(0)
2016	Russia U18	10	(9)
2016	Russia U19	4	(0)
- * Club domestic league appearances and goals as of 8 June 2024 ‡ National team caps and goals as of 11 October 2016

Anton Andreyevich Terekhov (Russian: Антон Андреевич Терехов; born 30 January 1998) is a Russian football player who plays as right winger.

== Club career ==
He made his debut in the Russian Premier League for Dynamo Moscow on 17 April 2016 in a game against Krylia Sovetov Samara.

On 11 July 2019, he joined Krylia Sovetov Samara on loan for the 2019–20 season.

On 25 February 2021, he moved to Tambov on loan until the end of the 2020–21 season. Upon his return from Tambov loan, he did not train with the main squad and started the 2021–22 season with FC Dynamo-2 Moscow. On 26 January 2022, his contract with Dynamo was terminated by mutual consent.

On 7 February 2022, Terekhov signed with Neftekhimik Nizhnekamsk.

On 13 February 2023, signed with Shinnik Yaroslavl.

In the end of July 2024, Terekhov joined media football team 2DROTS Moscow.

== Career statistics ==
As of 8 June 2024

Club	Season	League			Cup		Continental		Total	
Club	Season	Division	Apps	Goals	Apps	Goals	Apps	Goals	Apps	Goals
Dynamo Moscow	2015–16	Russian Premier League	4	0	0	0	–		4	0
Dynamo Moscow	2016–17	Russian First League	3	0	0	0	–		3	0
Dynamo Moscow	2017–18	Russian Premier League	4	1	0	0	–		4	1
Dynamo Moscow	2018–19	Russian Premier League	2	0	1	0	–		3	0
Dynamo Moscow	2020–21	Russian Premier League	7	0	0	0	0	0	7	0
Dynamo Moscow	2021–22	Russian Premier League	0	0	0	0	–		0	0
Dynamo Moscow	Total		20	1	1	0	0	0	21	1
Dynamo-2 Moscow	2016–17	Russian Second League	6	2	–		–		6	2
Dynamo-2 Moscow	2020–21	Russian Second League	2	3	–		–		2	3
Dynamo-2 Moscow	2021–22	Russian Second League	5	2	–		–		5	2
Dynamo-2 Moscow	Total		13	7	0	0	0	0	13	7
Krylia Sovetov Samara (loan)	2019–20	Russian Premier League	12	0	1	0	–		13	0
Tambov (loan)	2020–21	Russian Premier League	11	0	–		–		11	0
Neftekhimik	2021–22	Russian First League	7	1	–		–		7	1
Neftekhimik	2022–23	Russian First League	9	0	1	0	–		10	0
Neftekhimik	Total		16	1	1	0	0	0	17	1
Shinnik Yaroslavl	2022–23	Russian First League	5	0	–		–		5	0
Shinnik Yaroslavl	2023–24	Russian First League	2	0	–		–		2	0
Shinnik Yaroslavl	Total		7	0	0	0	0	0	7	0
Chayka	2023–24	Russian Second League A	14	2	–		–		14	2
Career total			93	11	3	0	0	0	96	11
