= Dmitry German =

Belarusian footballer (born 1988)

Personal information
- Date of birth: 12 June 1988 (age 38)
- Place of birth: Biaroza, Brest Oblast, Belarusian SSR
- Height: 1.78 m (5 ft 10 in)
- Position: Attacking midfielder

Youth career
- 2004–2005: RUOR Minsk
- 2006: Dinamo Minsk

Senior career*
Years	Team	Apps	(Gls)
2007–2009	Bereza	79	(12)
2010	Baranovichi	28	(8)
2011–2012	Beltransgaz Slonim	46	(9)
2012	Vedrich-97 Rechitsa	12	(3)
2013	Gorodeya	19	(2)
2014–2015	Slavia Mozyr	43	(4)
2016–2018	Dinamo Brest	33	(6)
2017	→ Atlantas (loan)	16	(2)
2018	→ Slutsk (loan)	8	(0)
2019	Rukh Brest	22	(4)
2020	Lokomotiv Daugavpils	11	(6)
2021	Tambov	6	(0)
2021–2022	Volna Pinsk	36	(3)
2023	Ostrovets	31	(1)
2024	Molodechno	30	(2)
2025	Volna Pinsk	13	(0)
2025	Ostrovets	13	(0)

International career
2005	Belarus U17	2	(0)
- * Club domestic league appearances and goals as of 8 April 2026

Dmitry German (Belarusian: Дзмітры Герман; Russian: Дмитрий Герман; born 12 June 1988) is a Belarusian professional footballer.

== Honours ==
Dinamo Brest

- Belarusian Cup winner: 2016–17, 2017–18
