= Nikita Chagrov =

Russian footballer

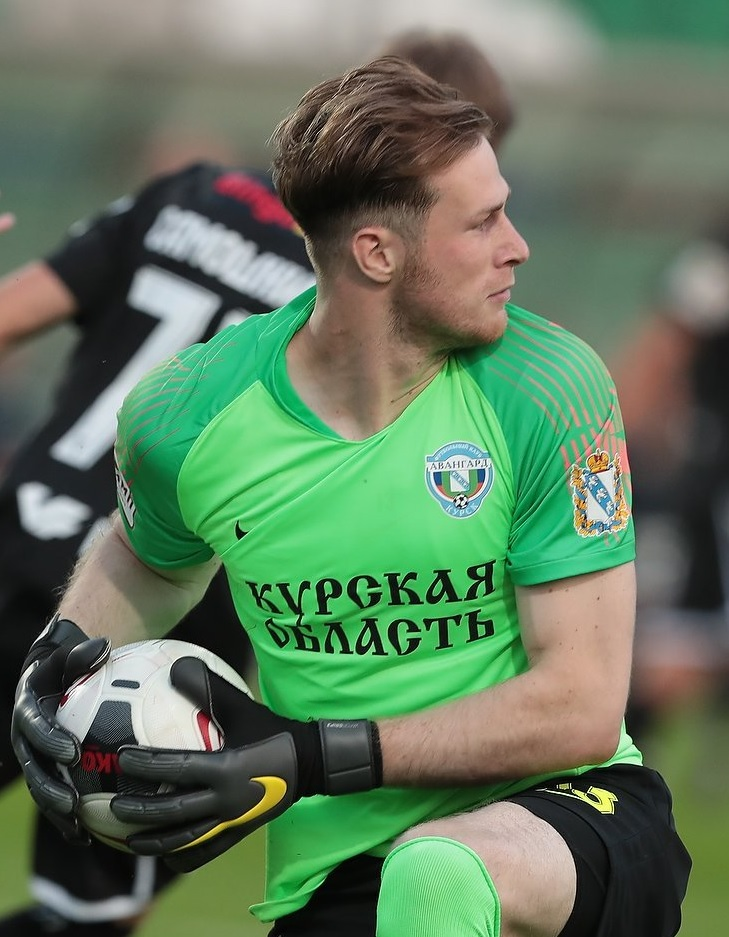
- Chagrov with Avangard Kursk in 2019

Personal information
- Full name: Nikita Vladimirovich Chagrov
- Date of birth: 24 April 1995 (age 31)
- Place of birth: Moscow, Russia
- Height: 2.01 m (6 ft 7 in)
- Position: Goalkeeper

Team information
- Current team: Rotor Volgograd
- Number: 13

Youth career
- SDYuSShOR-63 Smena Moscow

Senior career*
Years	Team	Apps	(Gls)
2012–2013	Torpedo Moscow	0	(0)
2013–2016	Rostov	0	(0)
2016–2017	Chayka Peschanokopskoye	25	(0)
2017–2019	Avangard Kursk	51	(0)
2020–2021	Tambov	1	(0)
2022–2023	Kórdrengir	6	(0)
2023	Okzhetpes	22	(0)
2023–	Rotor Volgograd	78	(0)
- * Club domestic league appearances and goals as of 16 May 2026

Nikita Vladimirovich Chagrov (Russian: Никита Владимирович Чагров; born 24 April 1995) is a Russian football player who plays for Rotor Volgograd.

== Club career ==
He made his debut in the Russian Professional Football League for FC Chayka Peschanokopskoye on 26 August 2016 in a game against FC Armavir.

He made his Russian Football National League debut for FC Avangard Kursk on 4 March 2018 in a game against FC Yenisey Krasnoyarsk.

On 17 January 2020, he signed a 2.5-year contract with Russian Premier League club FC Tambov. He made his Russian Premier League debut for Tambov on 26 September 2020 in a game against FC Spartak Moscow.
