= Said Aliyev =

Russian football player

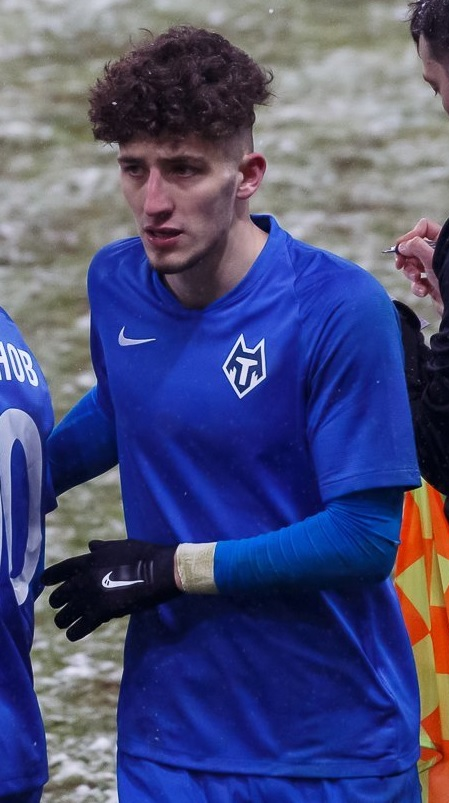
- Aliyev with FC Tambov in 2021

Personal information
- Full name: Said Aliyevich Aliyev
- Date of birth: 3 December 1998 (age 27)
- Place of birth: Makhachkala, Russia
- Height: 1.83 m (6 ft 0 in)
- Position: Forward

Team information
- Current team: FC Rotor Volgograd
- Number: 9

Youth career
- 2015–2018: FC Anzhi Makhachkala

Senior career*
Years	Team	Apps	(Gls)
2017–2019	FC Anzhi-2 Makhachkala	3	(0)
2019	→ FC Legion Dynamo Makhachkala (loan)	8	(1)
2019	FC Luch Vladivostok	24	(8)
2020	FC Nizhny Novgorod	5	(0)
2020	FC Veles Moscow	14	(2)
2021	FC Tambov	0	(0)
2021	FC Krymteplytsia Molodizhne		
2021–2022	FC Chayka Peschanokopskoye	29	(14)
2022–2024	FC SKA-Khabarovsk	51	(13)
2024–2025	FC Neftekhimik Nizhnekamsk	32	(4)
2025–2026	FC Chernomorets Novorossiysk	21	(8)
2026–	FC Rotor Volgograd	13	(7)
- * Club domestic league appearances and goals as of 16 May 2026

Said Aliyevich Aliyev (Russian: Саид Алиевич Алиев; born 3 December 1998) is a Russian football player who plays for FC Rotor Volgograd.

== Club career ==
He made his debut in the Russian Professional Football League for FC Anzhi-2 Makhachkala on 19 July 2017 in a game against FC Chernomorets Novorossiysk.

He made his Russian Football National League debut for FC Luch Vladivostok on 7 July 2019 in a game against FC Khimki. He came on as a substitute late in the first half and scored twice in a 2–5 loss.

On 11 January 2020 Aliyev moved to FC Nizhny Novgorod.

In February 2021, he moved to Russian Premier League club FC Tambov. However, after making just one appearance for the club in a Russian Cup game, he moved to FC Krymteplytsia Molodizhne.
