= Yevgeni Shlyakov =

Russian footballer (born 1991)

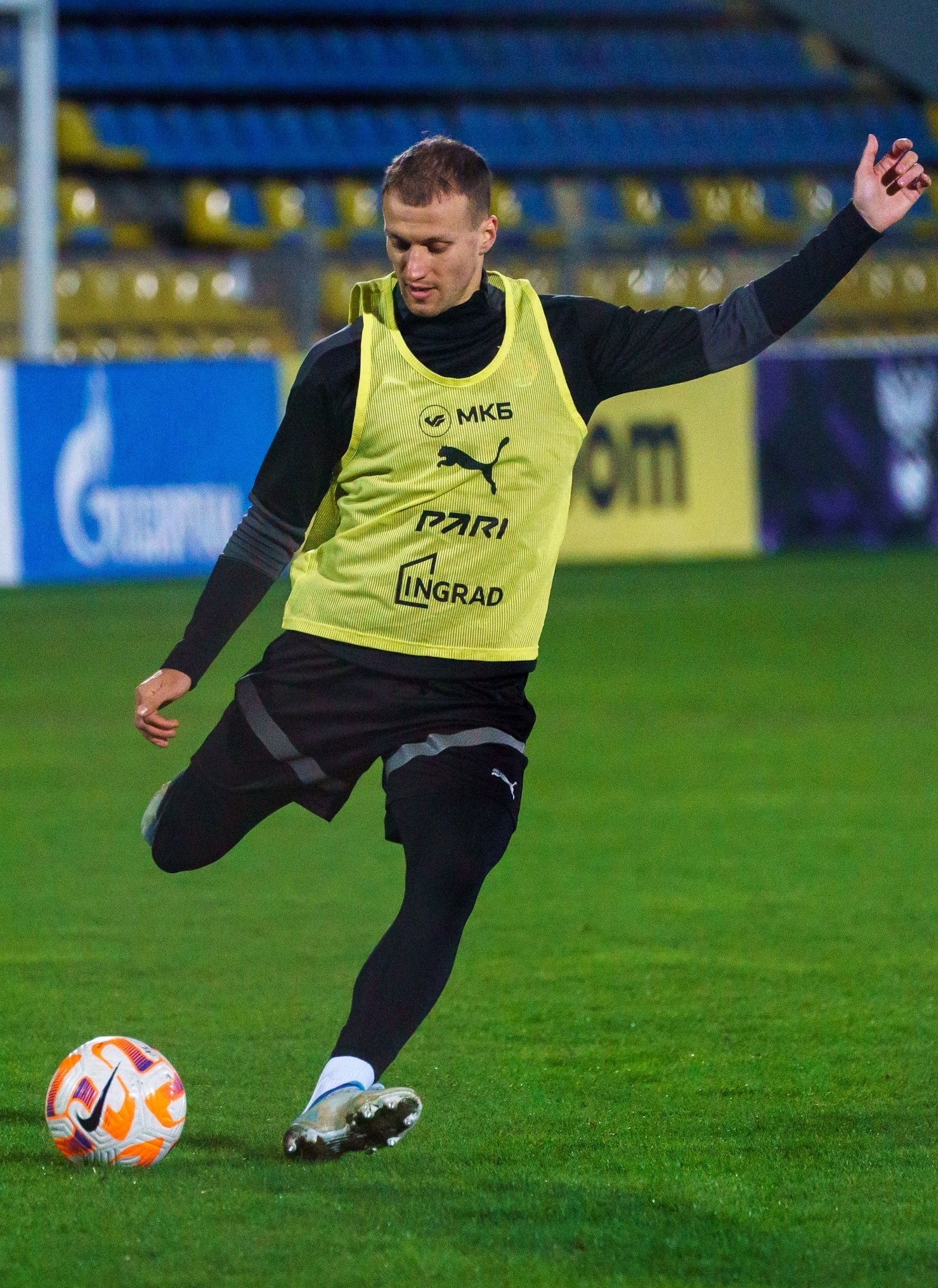
- Shlyakov with Torpedo Moscow in 2023

Personal information
- Full name: Yevgeni Igorevich Shlyakov
- Date of birth: 30 August 1991 (age 35)
- Place of birth: Bryansk, Russian SFSR, Soviet Union
- Height: 1.84 m (6 ft 0 in)
- Position: Left-back

Youth career
- –2008: Dynamo Bryansk

Senior career*
Years	Team	Apps	(Gls)
2009–2012	Dynamo Bryansk	39	(0)
2012	→ Tyumen (loan)	8	(0)
2012–2013	Dnepr Smolensk	18	(2)
2013–2014	Volgar	12	(0)
2014	→ Dynamo Bryansk (loan)	5	(0)
2014–2016	KAMAZ	52	(2)
2016–2021	Tambov	125	(3)
2019	→ SKA-Khabarovsk (loan)	21	(0)
2021–2022	UTA Arad	52	(1)
2022	Fakel Voronezh	11	(0)
2023	Torpedo Moscow	15	(0)
2023–2024	Volgar	24	(0)
2024	Dynamo Bryansk	9	(1)
2025–2026	Ufa	26	(0)

International career
2012	Russia U-21	5	(0)
- * Club domestic league appearances and goals as of 26 September 2026

Yevgeni Igorevich Shlyakov (Russian: Евгений Игоревич Шляков; born 30 August 1991) is a Russian former professional footballer.

== Club career ==
He made his Russian Football National League debut for FC Dynamo Bryansk on 21 April 2010 in a game against FC Mordovia Saransk.

He made his Russian Premier League debut for FC Tambov on 16 March 2020, when he started the game against PFC Krylia Sovetov Samara.

On 17 January 2021, he joined Romanian club FC UTA Arad.

On 15 June 2022, Shlyakov signed with Russian Premier League club Fakel Voronezh. His contract with Fakel was terminated by mutual consent on 1 December 2022.

On 28 December 2022, Shlyakov joined Torpedo Moscow.

== Honours ==
KAMAZ

- Russian Football National League 2 – Ural-Povolzhye Zone: 2014–15

Tambov

- Russian Football National League: 2018–19

== Career statistics ==
As of 27 November 2022

Club	Season	League			Cup		Continental		Other		Total	
Club	Season	Division	Apps	Goals	Apps	Goals	Apps	Goals	Apps	Goals	Apps	Goals
Dynamo Bryansk	2009	Second League	13	0	0	0	–		–		13	0
Dynamo Bryansk	2010	First League	11	0	1	0	–		–		12	0
Dynamo Bryansk	2011–12	First League	15	0	0	0	–		–		15	0
Tyumen (loan)	2011–12	Second League	8	0	–		–		–		8	0
Dnepr Smolensk	2012–13	Second League	18	2	–		–		–		18	2
Volgar Astrakhan	2013–14	Second League	10	0	2	0	–		–		12	0
Dynamo Bryansk (loan)	2013–14	Second League	5	0	–		–		–		5	0
Dynamo Bryansk (loan)	Total		44	0	1	0	0	0	0	0	45	0
KAMAZ Naberezhnye Chelny	2014–15	Second League	24	1	2	0	–		–		26	1
Krylia Sovetov Samara (loan)	2014–15	First League	–		–		–		4 (Note: Appearances in the FNL Cup)	0	4	0
KAMAZ Naberezhnye Chelny	2015–16	First League	24	1	1	0	–		–		25	1
KAMAZ Naberezhnye Chelny	Total		48	2	3	0	0	0	0	0	51	2
Tambov	2016–17	First League	35	0	2	0	–		3	0	40	0
Tambov	2017–18	First League	33	3	2	0	–		7	0	42	3
Tambov	2018–19	First League	24	0	2	0	–		–		26	0
SKA-Khabarovsk (loan)	2019–20	First League	19	0	2	0	–		–		21	0
Tambov	2019–20	Premier League	7	0	–		–		4	0	11	0
Tambov	2020–21	Premier League	16	0	2	0	–		–		18	0
Tambov	Total		115	3	8	0	0	0	14	0	137	3
UTA Arad	2020–21	Liga I	19	1	1	0	–		–		20	1
UTA Arad	2021–22	Liga I	33	0	1	0	–		–		34	0
UTA Arad	Total		52	1	2	0	0	0	0	0	54	1
Fakel Voronezh	2022–23	Premier League	10	0	1	0	–		–		11	0
Career total			324	8	19	0	0	0	18	0	361	8
