= Rodion Syamuk =

Ukrainian footballer

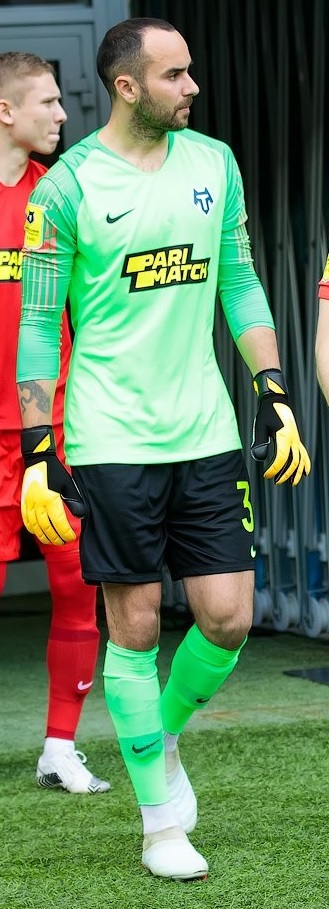
- Syamuk with FC Tambov in 2021

Personal information
- Full name: Rodion Valentynovych Syamuk
- Date of birth: 11 March 1989 (age 37)
- Place of birth: Novovolynsk, Ukrainian SSR
- Height: 1.87 m (6 ft 2 in)
- Position: Goalkeeper

Youth career
- 2008–2010: Dinamo Brest

Senior career*
Years	Team	Apps	(Gls)
2010–2011	Dinamo Brest	4	(0)
2010	→ Volna Pinsk (loan)	9	(0)
2012	Slavia Mozyr	1	(0)
2013	Granit Mikashevichi	19	(0)
2014	Smorgon	16	(0)
2015–2016	ROL.KO Konojady		
2016	Granit Mikashevichi	6	(0)
2017–2019	Slavia Mozyr	49	(0)
2020	Torpedo-BelAZ Zhodino	5	(0)
2021	Tambov	5	(0)
2022	Dinamo Brest	8	(0)
2022–2023	Akzhayik	20	(0)
- * Club domestic league appearances and goals

Rodion Syamuk (Ukrainian: Родіон Валентинович Сямук; born 11 March 1989) is a Ukrainian former professional footballer.

== Honours ==
Akzhayik

- Kazakhstan Cup: runner-up: 2022
