= Aleksandr Yerkin =

Russian footballer

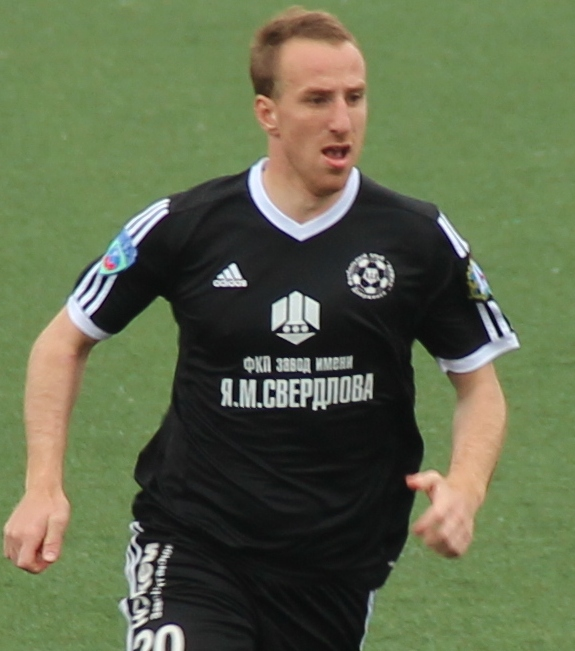

Personal information
- Full name: Aleksandr Sergeyevich Yerkin
- Date of birth: 1 September 1989 (age 37)
- Place of birth: Leningrad, Russian SFSR
- Height: 1.86 m (6 ft 1 in)
- Position: Forward

Youth career
- 2008: FC Shinnik Yaroslavl

Senior career*
Years	Team	Apps	(Gls)
2008–2012	FC Shinnik Yaroslavl	23	(1)
2011–2012	→ FC Torpedo Moscow (loan)	21	(1)
2012–2015	FC Khimik Dzerzhinsk	70	(9)
2015	FSK Dolgoprudny	14	(7)
2016	FC Dynamo St. Petersburg	10	(2)
2016–2017	FC Domodedovo Moscow	18	(2)
2017–2018	FC Dynamo Bryansk	9	(2)
2018	FC Druzhba Maykop	12	(2)
2019	FK Panevėžys	23	(2)
2020–2021	FC Daugavpils Lokomotiv	10	(9)
2021	FC Tambov	2	(0)
2021–2022	FC Tuapse	16	(2)
2022–2023	FC Sever Murmansk (amateur)		
2023	FC Yadro Saint Petersburg	1	(0)
- * Club domestic league appearances and goals

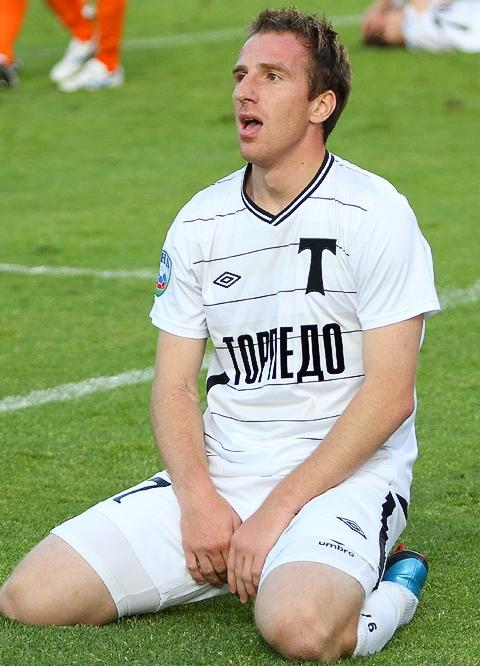
Aleksandr Yerkin in 2011

Aleksandr Sergeyevich Yerkin (Russian: Александр Серге́евич Еркин; born 1 September 1989) is a Russian former professional football player.

== Club career ==
He played 5 seasons in the Russian Football National League for FC Shinnik Yaroslavl, FC Torpedo Moscow and FC Khimik Dzerzhinsk.

In 2020 season he played for Lithuanian FK Panevėžys. He played 23 matches in A Lyga and scored two goals. In January 2020 team announced, that he left Panevėžys.

He made his Russian Premier League debut for FC Tambov on 7 March 2021 in a game against FC Dynamo Moscow.
