= Dmitri Merenchukov =

Russian footballer

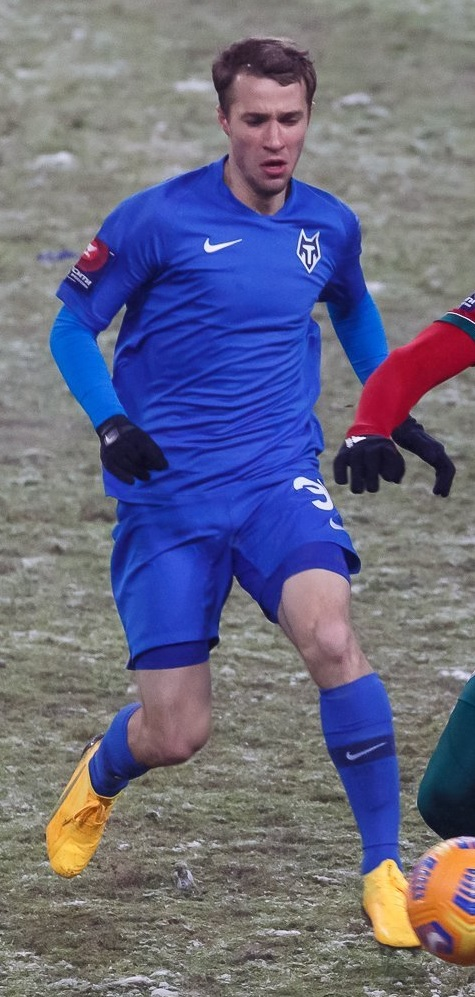
- Merenchukov with FC Tambov in 2021

Personal information
- Full name: Dmitri Andreyevich Merenchukov
- Date of birth: 3 March 1999 (age 27)
- Place of birth: Leninsk-Kuznetsky, Russia
- Height: 1.76 m (5 ft 9 in)
- Position: Forward

Youth career
- –2012: DYuSSh-2 Novokuznetsk
- 2012–2014: FC Metallurg-Kuzbass Novokuznetsk
- 2014–2017: PFC CSKA Moscow

Senior career*
Years	Team	Apps	(Gls)
2017–2018	PFC CSKA Moscow	0	(0)
2019	FC Novokuznetsk (amateur)		
2019–2021	FC Tambov	2	(0)
2021	FC Rodina Moscow	8	(1)
2021	→ FC Saturn Ramenskoye (loan)	17	(1)
2022–2023	FC Spartak Kostroma	23	(2)
2023–2025	FC Khimik Dzerzhinsk	55	(7)

International career^{‡}
2016	Russia U-17	5	(1)
- * Club domestic league appearances and goals as of 19 October 2025 ‡ National team caps and goals as of 23 January 2016

Dmitri Andreyevich Merenchukov (Russian: Дмитрий Андреевич Меренчуков; born 3 March 1999) is a Russian football player.

== Club career ==
He represented PFC CSKA Moscow in the 2016–17 UEFA Youth League and 2017–18 UEFA Youth League.

He made his debut in the Russian Premier League for FC Tambov on 5 December 2020 in a game against FC Spartak Moscow, as a starter.
