= Nikita Drozdov =

Russian football midfielder

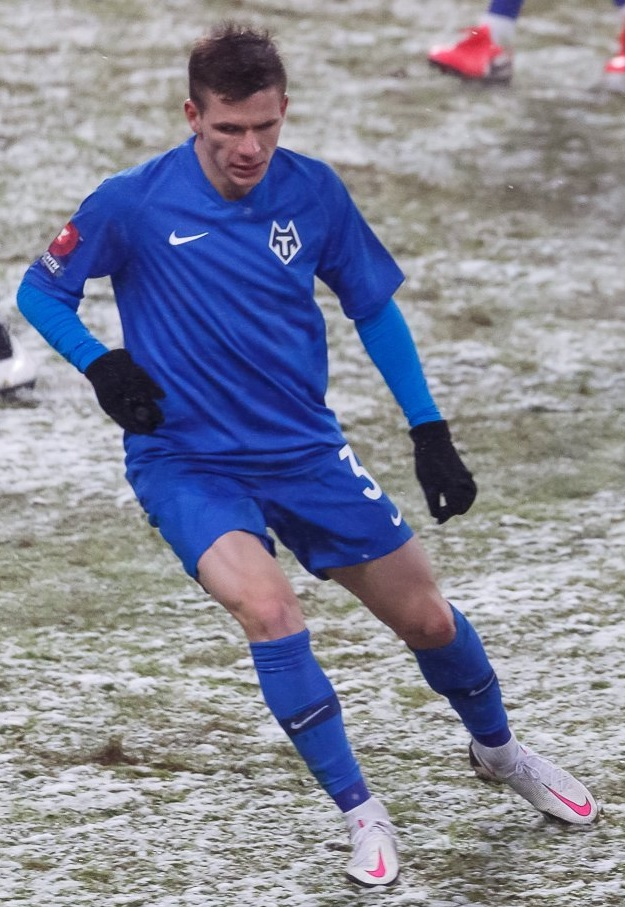
- Drozdov with FC Tambov in 2021

Personal information
- Full name: Nikita Yuryevich Drozdov
- Date of birth: 21 April 1992 (age 34)
- Place of birth: Moscow, Russia
- Height: 1.74 m (5 ft 9 in)
- Position: Midfielder

Team information
- Current team: LFK Titan (amateur)
- Number: 13

Youth career
- Lokomotiv Moscow
- Mikhailov SDYuSShOR Tver

Senior career*
Years	Team	Apps	(Gls)
2011	Torpedo-BelAZ Zhodino	1	(0)
2012	Sakhalin Yuzhno-Sakhalinsk	19	(0)
2013–2014	Amur-2010 Blagoveshchensk	23	(1)
2014–2015	Sakhalin Yuzhno-Sakhalinsk	23	(0)
2015–2017	Spartak Nalchik	60	(3)
2017–2018	Shinnik Yaroslavl	29	(2)
2018	Chayka Peschanokopskoye	8	(1)
2019–2020	Shinnik Yaroslavl	37	(3)
2020	Fakel Voronezh	21	(0)
2021	Tambov	9	(0)
2021–2022	Amkar Perm	24	(0)
2022–2023	Sakhalinets Moscow	34	(0)
2023	Maxline Vitebsk	16	(0)
2024	Sakhalin Yuzhno-Sakhalinsk	14	(1)
2025–	LFK Titan (amateur)		
- * Club domestic league appearances and goals as of 3 November 2024

Nikita Yuryevich Drozdov (Russian: Никита Юрьевич Дроздов; born 21 April 1992) is a Russian football midfielder who plays for amateur club LFK Titan.

== Club career ==
He made his debut in the Russian Second Division for FC Sakhalin Yuzhno-Sakhalinsk on 15 July 2012 in a game against FC Baikal Irkutsk. He made his Russian Football National League debut for Sakhalin on 6 July 2014 in a game against FC Anzhi Makhachkala.

He made his Russian Premier League debut for FC Tambov on 26 February 2021 in a game against FC Rotor Volgograd. He started in a 1–3 home loss.

== Personal life ==
His father Yuri Drozdov is a football coach and a former player, and his younger brother Ilya Drozdov is also a footballer.
