= FC Kuban Krasnodar (2018) =

Association football club in Russia

PFC Kuban Krasnodar
- Full name: Professional Football Club Kuban
- Nicknames: Ovoschi (Овощи, lit. The Veggies)
- Founded: 4 June 2018; 8 years ago
- Ground: Kuban Stadium, Krasnodar
- Capacity: 31,654
- Owners: ООО Optima Yug (70 %); ООО Rostagro (30 %)
- General director: vacant
- Manager: Vacant
- League: TBC
- 2025–26: Second stage: 10th
- Website: www.pfckuban.ru
| Home colours | Away colours |

Former crest of Kuban Krasnodar

PFC Kuban Krasnodar (Known as FC Urozhay from 2018 to 2020, Russian: Профессиональный футбольный клуб «Кубань») is a Russian football team based in Krasnodar. It was founded on 4 June 2018.

The club is colloquially seen by some to be the successor to FC Kuban Krasnodar, which dissolved in 2018 before being restarted at a regional level, although it is legally not permitted to claim its heritage.

== History ==
Private limited company Football Club Urozhay was officially registered on 4 June 2018. Originally it was to be named Ekaterinodar, but eventually, for unknown reasons, the club was named Urozhay. According to the results of the local web portal's Yuga.ru poll about the team's name that was held from 5 to 14 June, the poll option Urozhay took the last place. On 22 June 2018 FC Urozhay received a license for participating in the third-tier Russian Professional Football League in the 2018–19 Russian Professional Football League.

In July 2020 the club was renamed to PFC Kuban. On 24 July 2020, Russian Football Union approved the change of name, with the condition that the club is not the legal successor to former FC Kuban and cannot claim their sporting history.

On 15 June 2021, the club secured the first place in their PFL zone and promotion to Russian Football National League.

On 16 May 2024, Kuban was relegated from the First League.

On 19 June 2026, Kuban announced they will voluntarily drop out of the Russian Second League for financial reasons, but the club will continue fielding junior teams.
