= 2019–20 FC Tambov season =

FC Tambov
2019–20 season
- Chairman: Georgi Yartsev
- Manager: Aleksandr Grigoryan (until 19 October); Sergei Pervushin (Caretaker) (from 21 October)
- Stadium: Mordovia Arena (Rounds 1-19); Nizhny Novgorod Stadium (Rounds 20-30)
- Premier League: 14th
- Russian Cup: Round of 32 vs Tom Tomsk
- Top goalscorer: League: Three Players (7); All: Three Players (7)
Home colours	Away colours

The 2019–20 FC Tambov season was their first season in the Russian Premier League, the highest tier of association football in Russia.

== Season review ==
On 19 October, Aleksandr Grigoryan left his role as manager by mutual consent, with assistant manager Sergei Pervushin being appointed as Caretaker manager on 21 October.

On 4 February, Tambov confirmed that their home games for the second half of the season would be played at the Nizhny Novgorod Stadium in Nizhny Novgorod.

On 17 March, the Russian Premier League postponed all league fixtures until April 10 due to the COVID-19 pandemic.

On 1 April, the Russian Football Union extended the suspension of football until 31 May.

On 15 May, the Russian Football Union announced that the Russian Premier League season would resume on 21 June.

On 1 June, Khetag Khosonov and Miguel Cardoso left the club after their loan deals had expired.

On 16 July, the Russian Premier League announced that that day's game between Tambov and Sochi would not take place due to an outbreak of COVID-19 within the Sochi squad. On 21 July 2020, the Russian Football Union awarded the game 3–0 to Tambov.

== Squad ==
Note: Flags indicate national team as defined under FIFA eligibility rules; some limited exceptions apply. Players may hold more than one non-FIFA nationality.

No.	Pos.	Nation	Player
2	DF	RUS	Aleksei Rybin
3	DF	RUS	Guram Tetrashvili
4	FW	NGR	Fanen Akyam
5	DF	RUS	Yevgeni Shlyakov
6	MF	CIV	Geo Danny Ekra
8	MF	RUS	Anton Kilin
9	FW	RUS	Khasan Mamtov
11	FW	RUS	Artyom Fedchuk
13	FW	RUS	Vladimir Obukhov
14	FW	RUS	Amur Kalmykov
15	DF	RUS	Oleksandr Filin (on loan from Khimki)
19	FW	RUS	Georgi Melkadze (on loan from Spartak Moscow)

No.	Pos.	Nation	Player
22	DF	RUS	Igor Yurganov (on loan from Sochi)
25	MF	RUS	Pavel Karasyov
27	DF	RUS	Aleksei Gritsayenko (on loan from Krasnodar)
29	DF	UKR	Oleksandr Kapliyenko
30	DF	RUS	Soslan Takazov
58	DF	RUS	Adessoye Oyewole
73	GK	RUS	Nikita Chagrov
77	MF	RUS	Mikhail Kostyukov
88	GK	RUS	Giorgi Shelia
91	MF	RUS	Maksim Lazutkin
92	MF	MDA	Valeriu Ciupercă

=== Out on loan ===
Note: Flags indicate national team as defined under FIFA eligibility rules; some limited exceptions apply. Players may hold more than one non-FIFA nationality.

No.	Pos.	Nation	Player
7	MF	RUS	Oleg Chernyshov (at Aktobe)
48	FW	RUS	Andrei Chasovskikh (at Aktobe)
50	GK	RUS	Vladimir Sugrobov (at Pyunik)

No.	Pos.	Nation	Player
—	FW	RUS	Sergei Arkhipov (at Shakhtyor Soligorsk)
—	FW	RUS	Yevgeni Ragulkin (at Tyumen)

== Transfers ==
=== In ===
Date	Position	Nationality	Name	From	Fee	Ref.
Summer 2019	GK	(Russia)	Tamerlan Gabuyev			
Summer 2019	GK	(Russia)	Nikita Kotov			
Summer 2019	GK	(Russia)	Vitali Sychyov	Lokomotiv Moscow	Undisclosed	
Summer 2019	DF	(Ivory Coast)	Cédric Gogoua	BFC Daugavpils	Undisclosed	
Summer 2019	DF	(Russia)	Yegor Badyin	Ural Yekaterinburg	Undisclosed	
Summer 2019	DF	(Russia)	Renat Bagdashkin			
Summer 2019	DF	(Russia)	Ilya Mamkin			
Summer 2019	DF	(Russia)	Kamil Salakhetdinov	Lokomotiv Moscow	Undisclosed	
Summer 2019	MF	(Nigeria)	Mohammed Usman	Pyunik	Free	
Summer 2019	MF	(Russia)	Merab Chikhradze	Armavir	Undisclosed	
Summer 2019	MF	(Russia)	Vladimir Kabakhidze			
Summer 2019	MF	(Russia)	Arsen Kabolov			
Summer 2019	MF	(Russia)	Pavel Karasyov	Anzhi Makhachkala	Undisclosed	
Summer 2019	MF	(Russia)	Adam Katsayev	Akhmat Grozny	Undisclosed	
Summer 2019	MF	(Russia)	Dmitri Merenchukov	Novokuznetsk	Undisclosed	
Summer 2019	MF	(Russia)	Yevgeni Morev	Yenisey Krasnoyarsk	Undisclosed	
Summer 2019	MF	(Russia)	Aleksandr Shurlov	Akhlamov-UOR Neklinovsky District	Undisclosed	
Summer 2019	MF	(Russia)	Igor Sichkar	Orbita-Yunior Dzerzhinsky	Undisclosed	
Summer 2019	MF	(Russia)	Denis Skrypnikov			
Summer 2019	MF	(Russia)	Vildan Yermilov			
Summer 2019	FW	(Ivory Coast)	Mohamed Konaté	Pyunik	Free	
Summer 2019	FW	(Russia)	Roman Zherebyatyev			
26 May 2019	DF	(Russia)	Soslan Takazov	Armavir	Undisclosed	
29 May 2019	MF	(Russia)	Mikhail Kostyukov	Yenisey Krasnoyarsk	Undisclosed	
8 June 2019	DF	(Russia)	Ruslan Abazov	Nizhny Novgorod	Undisclosed	
8 June 2019	DF	(Russia)	Adessoye Oyewole	Orenburg	Undisclosed	
8 June 2019	FW	(Russia)	Ishkhan Geloyan	Shinnik Yaroslavl	Undisclosed	
19 June 2019	DF	(Russia)	Maksim Osipenko	Fakel Voronezh	Undisclosed	
1 July 2019	GK	(Russia)	Vladimir Sugrobov	Baltika Kaliningrad	Undisclosed	
2 July 2019	MF	(Russia)	Vladislav Kulik	Anzhi Makhachkala	Undisclosed	
4 July 2019	DF	(Russia)	Guram Tetrashvili	Gomel	Undisclosed	
9 July 2019	MF	(Russia)	Ivan Markelov	Anzhi Makhachkala	Undisclosed	
15 August 2019	MF	(Ghana)	Sulley Muniru	Dinamo Minsk	Undisclosed	
2 September 2019	FW	(Russia)	Vladimir Obukhov	Sochi	Free	
1 January 2020	FW	(Russia)	Artyom Fedchuk	Avangard Kursk	Undisclosed	
17 January 2020	GK	(Russia)	Nikita Chagrov	Avangard Kursk	Undisclosed	
9 February 2020	DF	(Ukraine)	Oleksandr Kapliyenko	Dinamo Tbilisi	Undisclosed	
21 February 2020	MF	(Ivory Coast)	Geo Danny Ekra		Free	
21 February 2020	FW	(Nigeria)	Fanen Akyam		Free	
7 July 2020	FW	(Russia)	Amur Kalmykov	Armavir	Undisclosed	

=== Loans in ===
Date from	Position	Nationality	Name	From	Date to	Ref.
5 July 2019	MF	(Russia)	Khetag Khosonov	CSKA Moscow	31 May 2020	
2 September 2019	DF	(Russia)	Aleksei Gritsayenko	Krasnodar	End of Season	
2 September 2019	FW	(Russia)	Georgi Melkadze	Spartak Moscow	End of Season	
20 February 2020	DF	(Russia)	Igor Yurganov	Sochi	End of Season	
22 February 2020	DF	(Russia)	Oleksandr Filin	Khimki	End of Season	
22 February 2020	MF	(Portugal)	Miguel Cardoso	Dynamo Moscow	31 May 2020	

=== Out ===
Date	Position	Nationality	Name	To	Fee	Ref.
29 August 2019	DF	(Ivory Coast)	Cédric Gogoua	CSKA Moscow	Undisclosed	
2 September 2019	FW	(Ivory Coast)	Mohamed Konaté	Khimki	Undisclosed	
20 January 2020	MF	(Russia)	Vladislav Kulik	Chayka Peschanokopskoye	Undisclosed	
27 January 2020	MF	(Russia)	Danil Klyonkin	Neftekhimik Nizhnekamsk	Undisclosed	
20 June 2020	MF	(Uzbekistan)	Vagiz Galiulin	Neftekhimik Nizhnekamsk	Undisclosed	
9 July 2020	DF	(Russia)	Andrei Yakovlev	Leningradets Leningrad Oblast	Undisclosed	
14 July 2020	DF	(Russia)	Kirill Bolshakov	SKA-Khabarovsk	Undisclosed	

=== Loans out ===
Date from	Position	Nationality	Name	To	Date to	Ref.
Summer 2019	DF	(Russia)	Yevgeni Shlyakov	SKA-Khabarovsk	Winter 2020	
Summer 2019	DF	(Russia)	Andrei Yakovlev	Zvezda St.Petersburg	End of season	
Summer 2019	MF	(Uzbekistan)	Vagiz Galiulin	Neftekhimik Nizhnekamsk	20 June 2020	
Summer 2019	FW	(Russia)	Sergei Arkhipov	Metallurg Lipetsk	End of season	
Summer 2019	FW	(Russia)	Yevgeni Ragulkin	Tyumen	Winter 2020	
17 January 2020	GK	(Russia)	Vladimir Sugrobov	Pyunik	End of Season	
21 February 2020	DF	(Russia)	Oleg Chernyshov	Aktobe	End of Season	
21 February 2020	FW	(Russia)	Andrei Chasovskikh	Aktobe	End of Season	
11 June 2020	FW	(Russia)	Sergei Arkhipov	Shakhtyor Soligorsk	End of Season 2020-21 Season	

=== Released ===
Date	Position	Nationality	Name	Joined	Date
Summer 2019	DF	(Russia)	Mikhail Mishchenko	Torpedo-BelAZ Zhodino	
Summer 2019	MF	(Ivory Coast)	Sékou Doumbia	Armavir	
Summer 2019	MF	(Montenegro)	Mladen Kašćelan	Baltika Kaliningrad	
Summer 2019	FW	(Russia)	Ivan Markelov	Kyzylzhar	18 February 2020
1 January 2020	DF	(Russia)	Maksim Osipenko	Rostov	9 January 2020
1 January 2020	MF	(Nigeria)	Benito	Dynamo Kyiv	3 January 2020
1 January 2020	MF	(Nigeria)	Mohammed Usman	Shakhter Karagandy	5 February 2020
1 January 2020	FW	(Russia)	Khyzyr Appayev	Tekstilshchik Ivanovo	
25 July 2020	GK	(Ukraine)	Amur Kalmykov		
25 July 2020	GK	(Russia)	Nikita Kotov		
25 July 2020	DF	(Russia)	Yegor Badyin		
25 July 2020	DF	(Russia)	Renat Bagdashkin		
25 July 2020	DF	(Russia)	Igor Dvoryashin		
25 July 2020	DF	(Russia)	Tamerlan Gabuyev		
25 July 2020	DF	(Russia)	Ilya Mamkin		
25 July 2020	DF	(Russia)	Kamil Salakhetdinov		
25 July 2020	DF	(Ukraine)	Anton Fedorenko		
25 July 2020	MF	(Ghana)	Sulley Muniru	Asante Kotoko	2 November 2020
25 July 2020	MF	(Ivory Coast)	Geo Danny Ekra		
25 July 2020	MF	(Russia)	Anton Arkhipov		
25 July 2020	MF	(Russia)	Merad Chikhradze		
25 July 2020	MF	(Russia)	Arsen Kabolov		
25 July 2020	MF	(Russia)	Adam Katsayev		
25 July 2020	MF	(Russia)	Denis Lenyo		
25 July 2020	MF	(Russia)	Dmitri Merenchukov		
25 July 2020	MF	(Russia)	Daniil Mishutin	Kafa Feodosia	
25 July 2020	MF	(Russia)	Yevgeni Morev	Kafa Feodosia	
25 July 2020	MF	(Ukraine)	Denis Romashev		
25 July 2020	MF	(Russia)	Nikita Salamatov	Irtysh Omsk	
25 July 2020	MF	(Russia)	Aleksandr Shurlov		
25 July 2020	MF	(Russia)	Denis Skrypnikov		
25 July 2020	MF	(Russia)	Vladislav Vlasov		
25 July 2020	MF	(Russia)	Vildan Yermilov	Dynamo Stavropol	
25 July 2020	FW	(Nigeria)	Fanen Akyam		
25 July 2020	FW	(Russia)	Ishkhan Geloyan	Baltika Kaliningrad	
25 July 2020	FW	(Russia)	Dmytro Kosiakov		
25 July 2020	FW	(Russia)	Khasan Mamtov	Kuban Krasnodar	
25 July 2020	FW	(Russia)	Mikhail Usanin		
25 July 2020	FW	(Russia)	Roman Zherebyatyev		

== Friendlies ==
18 January 2020	Tambov	3 – 0	Salyut Belgorod	Tambov
16:00 MSK (UTC+3)	Mamtov 59', 77'; Ciupercă 81'	Report		Stadium: STC Tambov; Referee: Dmitri Tarasov

29 January 2020	Radnik Surdulica (Serbia)	1 – 2	(Russia) Tambov	Belek, Turkey
17:30 MSK (UTC+3)	64'	Report	Obukhov 15' (pen.), 41'

3 February 2020	Tambov (Russia)	0 – 3	(Czech Republic) 1. FC Slovácko	Belek, Turkey
16:00 MSK (UTC+3)	Ade (red card) 38'	Report	M.Kohut 41'; Dvořák 50'; Zajíc 76'

6 February 2020	Tambov (Russia)	0 – 0	(Belarus) Gorodeya	Belek, Turkey
16:00 MSK (UTC+3)		Report

15 February 2020 FNL Cup	Tom Tomsk	2 – 2	Tambov	Geroskipou, Cyprus
13:45 MSK (UTC+3)	Viznovich 18', 65'; Buranov (yellow card) 34'; Gorbatyuk (yellow card) 45'; Shurygin (yellow card) 66'; A.Rukas (yellow card) 83'; V.Lyskov (yellow card) 89'	Report	Mamtov 7'; D.Merenchukov (yellow card) 15'; V.Kabakhidze (yellow card) 17'; R.Khaziev (yellow card) 44'; Fedchuk (yellow card) 55' (goal) 84'	Stadium: Geroskipou Municipality Stadium

18 February 2020 FNL Cup	Tambov	1 – 1	Tom Tomsk	Geroskipou, Cyprus
11:00 MSK (UTC+3)	Melkadze 55'	Report	Yezhov (yellow card) 67'; Suleymanov 71' (yellow card) 73'	Stadium: Geroskipou Municipality Stadium

21 February 2020 FNL Cup	Tambov	–	Krylia Sovetov	Geroskipou, Cyprus
13:45 MSK (UTC+3)				Stadium: Geroskipou Municipality Stadium

== Competitions ==
=== Premier League ===
==== Results by round ====
Round	1	2	3	4	5	6	7	8	9	10	11	12	13	14	15	16	17	18	19	20	21	22	23	24	25	26	27	28	29	30
Ground	A	A	H	H	A	H	H	A	H	H	A	A	H	H	A	A	H	A	H	H	A	H	A	A	H	A	H	A	H	A
Result	L	L	W	L	D	L	L	D	L	W	L	L	L	W	W	W	L	D	W	D	L	W	L	L	L	W	L	L	W	L
Position	13	16	12	14	12	14	14	16	16	16	16	16	16	16	14	14	15	15	11	13	13	11	13	13	14	13	14	14	14	14

Updated to match(es) played on 22 July 2020. Source: See Results
A = Away; H = Home; W = Win; D = Draw; L = Loss

==== Results ====
14 July 2019 1	Zenit St.Petersburg	2 – 1	Tambov	Saint Petersburg
19:00 MSK (UTC+3)	Yerokhin 46'; Dzyuba 48'; Rakitskiy (yellow card) 60'; Barrios (yellow card) 80'	Report	Benito 71'; Appayev (yellow card) 80'; Takazov (yellow card) 88'	Stadium: Krestovsky Stadium; Attendance: 46,231; Referee: Aleksei Eskov

21 July 2019 2	Lokomotiv Moscow	2 – 1	Tambov	Moscow
16:30 MSK (UTC+3)	Eder 31'; Ignatyev (yellow card) 33'; Ćorluka (yellow card) 43'; Krychowiak (yellow card) 79'; Lysov (yellow card) 90+1'	Report	Kostyukov 6' (yellow card) 13'; Ciupercă (yellow card) 74'; Markelov (yellow card) 81'; Takazov (yellow card) 90'	Stadium: RZD Arena; Attendance: 10,187; Referee: Stanislav Vasilyev

27 July 2019 3	Tambov	2 – 0	Spartak Moscow	Saransk
16:30 MSK (UTC+3)	Gogoua 29' (yellow card) 54'; Takazov (yellow card) 53' (goal) 69'; Shelia (yellow card) 90'	Report	Guliyev (yellow card) 3'; Ponce (yellow card) 59'; Gigot (yellow card) 69'; Mirzov (yellow card) 82'	Stadium: Mordovia Arena; Attendance: 23,238; Referee: Mikhail Vilkov
Note: Match played at the Mordovia Arena in Saransk instead of Tambov's regular Spartak Stadium.

4 August 2019 4	Tambov	0 – 1	Arsenal Tula	Saransk
16:30 MSK (UTC+3)	Oyewole (yellow card) 25'; Ciupercă (yellow card) 53'; Appayev (yellow card) 65'; Tetrashvili (yellow card) 90'	Report	Lutsenko 13'; Denisov (yellow card) 42'; Lomovitsky (yellow card) 50'	Stadium: Mordovia Arena; Attendance: 4,332; Referee: Sergey Ivanov
Note: Match played at the Mordovia Arena in Saransk instead of Tambov's regular Spartak Stadium.

10 August 2019 5	Orenburg	2 – 2	Tambov	Orenburg
14:00 MSK (UTC+3)	Fameyeh 74', 78'; Shakhov (yellow card) 75'	Report	Gogoua 26'; Ciupercă (yellow card) 34' (yellow-red card) 85'; Mamtov 68'	Stadium: Gazovik Stadium; Attendance: 4,076; Referee: Pavel Kukuyan

18 August 2019 6	Tambov	0 – 2	Krasnodar	Saransk
16:30 MSK (UTC+3)	Karasyov (yellow card) 15'; Tetrashvili (yellow card) 77'; Benito (yellow card) 81'; Khosonov (yellow card) 82'	Report	Wanderson 2'; Ramírez (yellow card) 11'; Utkin 78'	Stadium: Mordovia Arena; Attendance: 7,115; Referee: Nikolay Voloshin
Note: Match played at the Mordovia Arena in Saransk instead of Tambov's regular Spartak Stadium.

24 August 2019 7	Tambov	0 – 2	Dynamo Moscow	Saransk
14:00 MSK (UTC+3)	Oyewole (yellow card) 25'; Gogoua (yellow card) 57'	Report	Philipp 41'; Kaboré (yellow card) 43'; Panchenko 80'	Stadium: Mordovia Arena; Attendance: 4,816; Referee: Igor Panin
Note: Match played at the Mordovia Arena in Saransk instead of Tambov's regular Spartak Stadium.

31 August 2019 8	Akhmat Grozny	1 – 1	Tambov	Grozny
19:00 MSK (UTC+3)	Nižić (yellow card) 27'; Berisha 90+2'	Report	Osipenko 5'; Ciupercă (yellow card) 30'; Mamtov (yellow card) 90+1'; Benito (yellow card) 90+1'	Stadium: Akhmat-Arena; Attendance: 8,743; Referee: Sergei Karasev

15 September 2019 9	Tambov	0 – 2	CSKA Moscow	Saransk
16:30 MSK (UTC+3)	Ciupercă (yellow card) 72' (red card) 72'	Report	Gogoua (yellow card) 19'; Oblyakov (yellow card) 44'; Chalov (penalty missed) 66'; Bistrović 84'; Magnússon (yellow card) 90' (goal) 90+4'	Stadium: Mordovia Arena; Attendance: 17,145; Referee: Mikhail Vilkov
Note: Match played at the Mordovia Arena in Saransk instead of Tambov's regular Spartak Stadium.

21 September 2019 10	Tambov	2 – 1	Rostov	Saransk
19:00 MSK (UTC+3)	Karasyov (yellow card) 7'; Kostyukov (penalty missed) 15'; Melkadze 38', 61'; Tetrashvili (yellow card) 90'; Shelia (yellow card) 90+3'	Report	Shomurodov 27' (yellow card) 90+2'; Chistyakov (yellow card) 81'; Dolgov (yellow card) 90'	Stadium: Mordovia Arena; Attendance: 3,258; Referee: Vasiliy Kazantsev
Note: Match played at the Mordovia Arena in Saransk instead of Tambov's regular Spartak Stadium.

28 September 2019 11	Krylia Sovetov	2 – 0	Tambov	Samara
14:00 MSK (UTC+3)	Anton (yellow card) 39'; Anyukov (yellow card) 45+2'; Chernov (yellow card) 54'; Kabutov (yellow card) 65'; Sobolev 73' (pen.); Kanunnikov 74'; Karpov (yellow card) 77'	Report	Tetrashvili (yellow card) 7'; Rybin (yellow card) 37'; Karasyov (yellow card) 47'; Melkadze (yellow card) 54'; Oyewole (yellow card) 71'; Takazov (yellow card) 71'; Gritsayenko (yellow card) 87'	Stadium: Samara Arena; Attendance: 10,126; Referee: Sergey Ivanov

5 October 2019 12	Rubin Kazan	2 – 1	Tambov	Kazan
16:30 MSK (UTC+3)	Pliyev (yellow card) 4'; Konovalov 27'; Davitashvili 32'; Uremović (yellow card) 61'; Danchenko (yellow card) 68'; Kjartansson (yellow card) 77'; Dyupin (yellow card) 90+2'	Report	Oyewole (yellow card) 31'; Melkadze 54'; Kilin (yellow card) 89'	Stadium: Kazan Arena; Attendance: 2,585; Referee: Aleksei Eskov

19 October 2019 13	Tambov	1 – 2	Ural Yekaterinburg	Saransk
14:00 MSK (UTC+3)	Obukhov 61' (pen.)	Report	Haroyan (yellow card) 13' (goal) 76'; Bicfalvi (yellow card) 70'; Ilyin 73'; Boumal (yellow card) 90+1'	Stadium: Mordovia Arena; Attendance: 1,883; Referee: Igor Panin
Note: Match played at the Mordovia Arena in Saransk instead of Tambov's regular Spartak Stadium.

26 October 2019 14	Tambov	3 – 0	Ufa	Saransk
14:00 MSK (UTC+3)	Kostyukov 12'; Tetrashvili (yellow card) 53'; Obukhov 63'; Oyewole 66'; Kilin (yellow card) 80'; Ciupercă (yellow card) 82' (yellow-red card) 84'	Report	Vombergar (yellow card) 19'; Golubev (yellow card) 21'; Bizjak (yellow card) 37'; Carp (yellow card) 51'	Stadium: Mordovia Arena; Attendance: 1,751; Referee: Sergey Lapochkin
Note: Match played at the Mordovia Arena in Saransk instead of Tambov's regular Spartak Stadium.

2 November 2019 15	Sochi	1 – 2	Tambov	Sochi
16:30 MSK (UTC+3)	Pomerko (yellow card) 28'; Miladinović (yellow card) 33'; Noboa 44'; Kalugin (yellow card) 64'	Report	Kostyukov 41'; Melkadze 56' (yellow card) 71'; Kilin (yellow card) 90+1'	Stadium: Fisht Olympic Stadium; Attendance: 6,138; Referee: Nikolay Voloshin

9 November 2019 16	Rostov	1 – 2	Tambov	Rostov-on-Don
16:30 MSK (UTC+3)	Sigurðarson 7' (yellow card) 56'; Hadžikadunić (yellow card) 60'	Report	Osipenko (yellow card) 33'; Kostyukov (yellow card) 41'; Melkadze 52' (yellow card) 64'; Obukhov 70'; Oyewole (yellow card) 82'	Stadium: Rostov Arena; Attendance: 25,589; Referee: Sergei Karasev

22 November 2019 17	Tambov	2 – 3	Lokomotiv Moscow	Saransk
19:30 MSK (UTC+3)	Kostyukov (yellow card) 35' (goal) 47'; Obukhov 39'	Report	Krychowiak 29', 55'; Oyewole 33' (o.g.); Barinov (yellow card) 65'	Stadium: Mordovia Arena; Attendance: 4,038; Referee: Pavel Kukuyan
Note: Match played at the Mordovia Arena in Saransk instead of Tambov's regular Spartak Stadium.

2 December 2019 18	Krasnodar	0 – 0	Tambov	Krasnodar
19:30 MSK (UTC+3)	Suleymanov (yellow card) 12'; Spajić (yellow card) 90+5'	Report	Melkadze (yellow card) 32'	Stadium: Krasnodar Stadium; Attendance: 15,439; Referee: Sergey Lapochkin

7 December 2019 19	Tambov	3 – 0	Orenburg	Saransk
14:00 MSK (UTC+3)	Radaković 47' (o.g.); Obukhov 65'; Kilin 82'; Melkadze (yellow card) 88'	Report	Zotov (yellow card) 37' (yellow-red card) 51'; Škoflek (yellow card) 44'; Rogić (yellow card) 47'; Sivakow (yellow card) 52'; Miškić (yellow card) 67'	Stadium: Mordovia Arena; Attendance: 835; Referee: Vladislav Bezborodov
Note: Match played at the Mordovia Arena in Saransk instead of Tambov's regular Spartak Stadium.

1 March 2020 20	Tambov	0 – 0	Rubin Kazan	Nizhny Novgorod
14:00 MSK (UTC+3)	Oyewole (yellow card) 55'; Tetrashvili (yellow card) 57'	Report	Abildgaard (yellow card) 40'; Zuyev (yellow card) 67'	Stadium: Nizhny Novgorod Stadium; Attendance: 3,858; Referee: Aleksei Eskov
Note: Match played at the Nizhny Novgorod Stadium in Nizhny Novgorod instead of Tambov's regular Spartak Stadium.

7 March 2020 21	Dynamo Moscow	1 – 0	Tambov	Moscow
16:30 MSK (UTC+3)	Komlichenko 34'; Rausch (yellow card) 84'	Report	Filin (yellow card) 21'; Gritsayenko (yellow card) 59'; Obukhov (yellow card) 80'; Melkadze (yellow card) 89'	Stadium: VTB Arena; Attendance: 10,143; Referee: Vasili Kazartsev

16 March 2020 22	Tambov	3 – 0	Krylia Sovetov	Nizhny Novgorod
19:30 MSK (UTC+3)	Melkadze 33' (yellow card) 60'; Obukhov 54'; Kilin (yellow card) 61' (goal) 80'	Report	Kabutov (yellow card) 25'; Chernov (yellow card) 45+1'; Radonjić (yellow card) 46'; Anyukov (yellow card) 65'	Stadium: Nizhny Novgorod Stadium; Attendance: 2,702; Referee: Sergei Karasev
Note: Match played at the Nizhny Novgorod Stadium in Nizhny Novgorod instead of Tambov's regular Spartak Stadium.

21 June 2020 23	Ufa	2 – 1	Tamobv	Ufa
15:00 MSK (UTC+3)	Fomin 20' (pen.); Krotov (yellow card) 30'; Carp (yellow card) 73'; Giorgobiani 90+1'	Report	Gritsayenko (yellow card) 26'; Tetrashvili (yellow card) 30' (red card) 36'; Ciupercă (yellow card) 57'; Filin (yellow card) 70'; Kostyukov 77'; Shelia (yellow card) 90'	Stadium: Neftyanik Stadium; Referee: Vitaly Meshkov
Note: Match originally scheduled for 22 March, but postponed on 17 March due to the COVID-19 pandemic.

28 June 2020 24	Ural Yekaterinburg	2 – 1	Tambov	Yekaterinburg
16:30 MSK (UTC+3)	Boumal (yellow card) 15'; Bicfalvi 20' (pen.), 70' (yellow card) 82' (yellow-red card) 82'; Zolotov (yellow card) 38'; Bavin (yellow card) 50'; Yegorychev (yellow card) 51'; Augustyniak (yellow card) 63'	Report	Kostyukov 68'; Melkadze (yellow card) 79'; Ciupercă (yellow card) 90+2'; Mamtov (yellow card) 90+3'; Filin (yellow card) 90+4'	Stadium: Central Stadium; Referee: Aleksei Matyunin
Note: Match originally scheduled for 5 April, but postponed on 17 March due to the COVID-19 pandemic.

1 July 2020 25	Tambov	1 – 2	Zenit St.Petersburg	Nizhny Novgorod
17:30 MSK (UTC+3)	Ciupercă (yellow card) 12' (goal) 88' (pen.); Filin (yellow card) 90+2'	Report	Azmoun 43'; Rigoni 90+1'	Stadium: Nizhny Novgorod Stadium; Referee: Mikhail Vilkov
Note: Match played at the Nizhny Novgorod Stadium in Nizhny Novgorod instead of Tambov's regular Spartak Stadium. Match originally scheduled for 12 April, but postponed on 1 April due to the COVID-19 pandemic.

4 July 2020 26	Spartak Moscow	2 – 3	Tambov	Moscow
18:30 MSK (UTC+3)	Umyarov (yellow card) 26'; Bakayev 36' (pen.); Dzhikiya (yellow card) 53'; Larsson 64'; Gigot (yellow card) 81'; Rasskazov (yellow card) 86'	Report	Oyewole (yellow card) 34'; Takazov (yellow card) 34'; Ciupercă (yellow card) 46' (goal) 60'; Gritsayenko 73'; Obukhov 82' (pen.)	Stadium: Otkritie Arena; Referee: Vladimir Moskalyov
Note: Match originally scheduled for 19 April, but postponed on 1 April due to the COVID-19 pandemic.

7 July 2020 27	Tambov	1 – 2	Akhmat Grozny	Nizhny Novgorod
18:30 MSK (UTC+3)	Gritsayenko (yellow card) 20'; Melkadze 33' (pen.) (yellow card) 90+3'; Takazov (yellow card) 82'	Report	Ismael 20' (pen.) (yellow card) 45+2'; Shvets (yellow card) 52'; Nižić (yellow card) 63'; Vizeu 73'; Glushakov (yellow card) 80'; Gorodov (yellow card) 90+2'	Stadium: Nizhny Novgorod Stadium; Referee: Sergey Ivanov
Note: Match played at the Nizhny Novgorod Stadium in Nizhny Novgorod instead of Tambov's regular Spartak Stadium. = Match originally scheduled for 25 April, but postponed on 1 April due to the COVID-19 pandemic.

11 July 2020 28	Arsenal Tula	2 – 1	Tambov	Tula
16:00 MSK (UTC+3)	Kostadinov (yellow card) 8'; Panteleyev 20' (pen.) (yellow card) 71'; Lutsenko 84'	Report	Tetrashvili (yellow card) 18'; Kostyukov 55'	Stadium: Arsenal Stadium; Referee: Pavel Kukuyan
Note: Match originally scheduled for 2 May, but postponed on 1 April due to the COVID-19 pandemic.

16 July 2020 29	Tambov	3 – 0	Sochi	Nizhny Novgorod
20:30 MSK (UTC+3)				Stadium: Nizhny Novgorod Stadium
Note: Match played at the Nizhny Novgorod Stadium in Nizhny Novgorod instead of Tambov's regular Spartak Stadium. Match originally scheduled for 6 May, but postponed on 1 April due to the COVID-19 pandemic. Match postponed for a second time on 16 July due to COVID-19 within the Sochi squad, and awarded as a 3-0 win to Tambov on 21 July.

22 July 2020 30	CSKA Moscow	2 – 0	Tambov	Moscow
19:00 MSK (UTC+3)	Shchennikov 26'; Diveyev (yellow card) 40'; Dzagoev (yellow card) 55'; Oblyakov 78'	Report	Filin (yellow card) 23'; Melkadze (yellow card) 39' (yellow-red card) 45+1'; Kilin (yellow card) 88'	Stadium: VEB Arena; Referee: Kirill Levnikov
Note: Match originally scheduled for 17 May, but postponed on 1 April due to the COVID-19 pandemic.

==== League table ====
Pos	Team	Pld	W	D	L	GF	GA	GD	Pts	Qualification or relegation
12	Sochi	30	8	9	13	40	39	+1	33	
13	Akhmat Grozny	30	7	10	13	27	46	−19	31 (Note: Head-to-head points: Akhmat Grozny 8, Tambov 4, Krylia Sovetov Samara 4. Head-to-head goal difference: Akhmat Grozny +3, Tambov 0, Krylia Sovetov Samara –3)	
14	Tambov	30	9	4	17	37	41	−4	31	
15	Krylia Sovetov Samara (R)	30	8	7	15	33	40	−7	31	Relegation to Football National League
16	Orenburg (R)	30	7	6	17	28	52	−24	27	Relegation to Football National League

Source: Russian Premier Liga, Soccerway
Rules for classification: 1) Points; 2) Head-to-head points; 3) Head-to-head matches won; 4) Head-to-head goal difference; 5) Head-to-head goals scored; 6) Matches won; 7) Goal difference; 8) Goals scored; 9) Play-off.
(R) Relegated

=== Russian Cup ===
25 September 2019 Round of 32	Tom Tomsk	4 – 0	Tambov	Tomsk
15:00 MSK (UTC+3)	Tlupov 28'; Talalay 36'; Kalenkovich (yellow card) 61'; Sasin 63'; Shalayev (yellow card) 67'; Kazankov 74' (pen.)	Report	Mamtov (yellow card) 27'; Kulik (yellow card) 41'; Rybin (yellow card) 70'	Stadium: Trud Stadium; Attendance: 2,400; Referee: Aleksei Matyunin

== Squad statistics ==
As of match played 22 July 2020

=== Appearances and goals ===
No.	Pos	Nat	Player	Total		Premier League		Russian Cup	
No.	Pos	Nat	Player	Apps	Goals	Apps	Goals	Apps	Goals
2	DF	(Russia) RUS	Aleksei Rybin	20	0	19	0	1	0
3	DF	(Russia) RUS	Guram Tetrashvili	25	0	24+1	0	0	0
5	DF	(Russia) RUS	Yevgeni Shlyakov	7	0	5+2	0	0	0
7	MF	(Russia) RUS	Nikita Salamatov	1	0	0+1	0	0	0
8	MF	(Russia) RUS	Anton Kilin	26	2	22+3	2	1	0
9	FW	(Russia) RUS	Khasan Mamtov	18	1	3+14	1	1	0
11	FW	(Russia) RUS	Artyom Fedchuk	6	0	1+5	0	0	0
13	FW	(Russia) RUS	Vladimir Obukhov	17	7	17	7	0	0
14	FW	(Russia) RUS	Amur Kalmykov	3	0	1+2	0	0	0
15	DF	(Russia) RUS	Oleksandr Filin	9	0	8+1	0	0	0
19	FW	(Russia) RUS	Georgi Melkadze	18	7	18	7	0	0
22	DF	(Russia) RUS	Igor Yurganov	7	0	3+4	0	0	0
25	MF	(Russia) RUS	Pavel Karasyov	27	0	21+5	0	0+1	0
27	DF	(Russia) RUS	Aleksei Gritsayenko	20	1	19	1	1	0
29	DF	(Ukraine) UKR	Oleksandr Kapliyenko	9	0	4+5	0	0	0
30	DF	(Russia) RUS	Soslan Takazov	18	1	15+3	1	0	0
58	DF	(Russia) RUS	Adessoye Oyewole	26	1	26	1	0	0
77	MF	(Russia) RUS	Mikhail Kostyukov	27	7	25+2	7	0	0
81	MF	(Russia) RUS	Vladimir Kabakhidze	5	0	0+5	0	0	0
88	GK	(Russia) RUS	Giorgi Shelia	29	0	29	0	0	0
92	MF	(Moldova) MDA	Valeriu Ciupercă	24	2	20+3	2	1	0
Players away from the club on loan:
7	MF	(Russia) RUS	Oleg Chernyshov	9	0	2+6	0	0+1	0
48	FW	(Russia) RUS	Andrei Chasovskikh	3	0	0+3	0	0	0
50	GK	(Russia) RUS	Vladimir Sugrobov	1	0	0	0	1	0
Players who appeared for Tambov but left during the season:
6	MF	(Russia) RUS	Vladislav Kulik	6	0	2+3	0	1	0
7	MF	(Portugal) POR	Miguel Cardoso	1	0	0+1	0	0	0
11	MF	(Nigeria) NGR	Benito	9	1	0+8	1	0+1	0
14	FW	(Russia) RUS	Khyzyr Appayev	14	0	7+6	0	1	0
15	MF	(Nigeria) NGR	Mohammed Usman	2	0	1	0	1	0
17	MF	(Russia) RUS	Khetag Khosonov	8	0	1+7	0	0	0
19	FW	(Ivory Coast) CIV	Mohamed Konaté	2	0	1+1	0	0	0
23	MF	(Russia) RUS	Danil Klyonkin	3	0	0+3	0	0	0
27	DF	(Ivory Coast) CIV	Cédric Gogoua	5	2	5	2	0	0
55	DF	(Russia) RUS	Maksim Osipenko	18	1	17	1	1	0
70	MF	(Ghana) GHA	Sulley Muniru	1	0	0	0	1	0
99	MF	(Russia) RUS	Ivan Markelov	5	0	3+2	0	0	0

=== Goal scorers ===
Place	Position	Nation	Number	Name	Premier League	Russian Cup	Total
1	FW	(Russia)	13	Vladimir Obukhov	7	0	7
1	FW	(Russia)	19	Georgi Melkadze	7	0	7
1	MF	(Russia)	77	Mikhail Kostyukov	7	0	7
4	DF	(Ivory Coast)	27	Cédric Gogoua	2	0	2
4	MF	(Russia)	8	Anton Kilin	2	0	2
4	MF	(Moldova)	92	Valeriu Ciupercă	2	0	2
7	FW	(Nigeria)	11	Benito	1	0	1
7	DF	(Russia)	30	Soslan Takazov	1	0	1
7	FW	(Russia)	9	Khasan Mamtov	1	0	1
7	DF	(Russia)	55	Maksim Osipenko	1	0	1
7	DF	(Russia)	58	Adessoye Oyewole	1	0	1
7	DF	(Russia)	27	Aleksei Gritsayenko	1	0	1
7				Own goal	1	0	1
Total					34	0	34

=== Clean sheets ===
Place	Position	Nation	Number	Name	Premier League	Russian Cup	Total
1	GK	(Russia)	88	Giorgi Shelia	6	0	6
Total					6	0	6

=== Disciplinary record ===
Number	Nation	Position	Name	Premier League		Russian Cup		Total	
Number	Nation	Position	Name	Yellow card	Red card	Yellow card	Red card	Yellow card	Red card
2	(Russia)	DF	Aleksei Rybin	1	0	1	0	2	0
3	(Russia)	DF	Guram Tetrashvili	8	1	0	0	8	1
8	(Russia)	MF	Anton Kilin	5	0	0	0	5	0
9	(Russia)	FW	Khasan Mamtov	2	0	1	0	3	0
13	(Russia)	FW	Vladimir Obukhov	1	0	0	0	1	0
15	(Russia)	DF	Oleksandr Filin	5	0	0	0	5	0
19	(Russia)	FW	Georgi Melkadze	11	1	0	0	11	1
25	(Russia)	MF	Pavel Karasyov	3	0	0	0	3	0
27	(Russia)	DF	Aleksei Gritsayenko	4	0	0	0	4	0
30	(Russia)	DF	Soslan Takazov	6	0	0	0	6	0
58	(Russia)	DF	Adessoye Oyewole	7	0	0	0	7	0
77	(Russia)	MF	Mikhail Kostyukov	3	0	0	0	3	0
88	(Russia)	GK	Giorgi Shelia	3	0	0	0	3	0
92	(Moldova)	MF	Valeriu Ciupercă	12	3	0	0	12	3
Players away on loan:
Players who left Tambov during the season:
6	(Russia)	MF	Vladislav Kulik	0	0	1	0	1	0
11	(Nigeria)	MF	Benito	2	0	0	0	2	0
14	(Russia)	MF	Khyzyr Appayev	2	0	0	0	2	0
17	(Russia)	MF	Khetag Khosonov	1	0	0	0	1	0
27	(Ivory Coast)	DF	Cédric Gogoua	2	0	0	0	2	0
55	(Russia)	DF	Maksim Osipenko	1	0	0	0	1	0
99	(Russia)	MF	Ivan Markelov	1	0	0	0	1	0
Total				80	5	3	0	83	5
