= 2012–13 Russian Second Division =

3rd annual Russian soccer championship series

Russian Second Division
- Season: 2012–13

The 2012–13 Russian Second Division was the third strongest division in Russian football. The Second Division is geographically divided into 5 zones. The winners of each zone are automatically promoted into the First Division. The bottom finishers of each zone lose professional status and are relegated into the Amateur Football League.

== West ==
=== Standings ===
Pos	Team	Pld	W	D	L	GF	GA	GD	Pts	Promotion or relegation
1	Khimik Dzerzhinsk (P)	26	15	7	4	37	18	+19	52	Promotion to Russian National Football League
2	Pskov-747 Pskov	26	14	7	5	41	23	+18	49 (Note: PSK 3–1 TEK; TEK 2–1 PSK)	
3	Tekstilshchik Ivanovo	26	14	7	5	34	20	+14	49	
4	Dolgoprudny	26	13	6	7	31	28	+3	45	
5	Volga Tver	26	12	5	9	31	22	+9	41	
6	Dnepr Smolensk	26	11	8	7	33	28	+5	41	
7	Lokomotiv-2 Moscow	26	11	7	8	36	26	+10	40 (Note: LOK 2–0 SPA; SPA 0–1 LOK)	
8	Spartak Kostroma	26	11	7	8	24	20	+4	40	
9	Sever Murmansk	26	10	7	9	34	31	+3	37	
10	Karelia Petrozavodsk	26	8	5	13	19	33	−14	29	
11	Vologda	26	7	3	16	25	37	−12	24	
12	Znamya Truda Orekhovo-Zuyevo	26	4	7	15	14	36	−22	19 (Note: ZNA 3–2 RUS; RUS 0–0 ZNA)	
13	Rus Saint Petersburg	26	4	7	15	24	45	−21	19	
14	Piter Saint Petersburg (R)	26	3	7	16	20	36	−16	16	Relegation to Amateur Football League

Source: rfspro.ru
Rules for classification: 1st points; 2nd matches won; 3rd head-to-head (points, matches won, goal difference, goals scored, away goals scored); 4th goal difference; 5th goals scored; 6th away goals scored
(P) Promoted; (R) Relegated

=== Top scorers ===
Source: rfspro.ru (in Russian)

11 goals

- Aleksei Zhdanov (Khimik)

10 goals

- Konstantin Podkorytov (Tekstilshchik)
- Mukhammad Sultonov (Lokomotiv-2)

8 goals

- Anton Shishayev (Pskov-747)
- Artyom Sivayev (Dnepr)
- Aleksandr Yevstafyev (Rus)

== Center ==
=== Standings ===
Pos	Team	Pld	W	D	L	GF	GA	GD	Pts	Promotion or relegation
1	Arsenal Tula (P)	30	22	7	1	74	20	+54	73	Promotion to Russian National Football League
2	Fakel Voronezh	30	20	4	6	55	33	+22	64	
3	Sokol Saratov	30	15	9	6	44	17	+27	54	
4	Metallurg Lipetsk	30	14	7	9	46	40	+6	49	
5	Kaluga	30	14	5	11	52	33	+19	47	
6	Zenit Penza	30	13	7	10	35	26	+9	46	
7	Podolye Podolsky district	30	12	8	10	50	40	+10	44	
8	Vityaz Podolsk	30	12	7	11	41	42	−1	43	
9	Avangard Kursk	30	11	8	11	42	40	+2	41 (Note: LOK 1–1 AVA; AVA 0–0 LOK)	
10	Lokomotiv Liski	30	11	8	11	35	46	−11	41	
11	Zvezda Ryazan	30	10	9	11	47	36	+11	39	
12	Gubkin (R)	30	10	7	13	34	40	−6	37	Excluded from professional football (Note: FC Gubkin excluded from professional football for financial reasons.)
13	Metallurg Vyksa	30	8	7	15	26	48	−22	31	
14	Metallurg-Oskol Stary Oskol	30	7	5	18	28	61	−33	26	
15	Spartak Tambov (R)	30	6	3	21	28	77	−49	21	Relegation to Amateur Football League
16	Oryol	30	2	5	23	18	56	−38	11	

Source: rfspro.ru
Rules for classification: 1st points; 2nd matches won; 3rd head-to-head (points, matches won, goal difference, goals scored, away goals scored); 4th goal difference; 5th goals scored; 6th away goals scored
(P) Promoted; (R) Relegated

=== Top scorers ===
Source: rfspro.ru (in Russian)

16 goals

- Aleksandr Kutyin (Arsenal)

13 goals

- Rinat Timokhin (Arsenal)

12 goals

- Aleksei Antonnikov (Zenit)
- Aleksei Averyanov (Podolye)

11 goals

- Sergei Anokhin (Kaluga)
- Maksim Protserov (Metallurg Vyksa)
- Yevgeny Savin (Arsenal)

10 goals

- Karen Sargsyan (Sokol / Kaluga)
- Dmitri Sokolov (Sokol)

== South ==
=== Standings ===
Pos	Team	Pld	W	D	L	GF	GA	GD	Pts	Promotion or relegation
1	Angusht Nazran (P)	32	21	6	5	45	19	+26	69	Promotion to Russian National Football League
2	Chernomorets Novorossiysk	32	20	9	3	53	17	+36	69	
3	Armavir	32	19	6	7	51	25	+26	63	
4	Astrakhan	32	17	11	4	62	31	+31	62	
5	Mashuk-KMV Pyatigorsk	32	15	8	9	37	20	+17	53	
6	Taganrog	32	15	6	11	50	34	+16	51	
7	Alania-d Vladikavkaz	32	14	7	11	50	37	+13	49	
8	Dagdizel Kaspiysk	32	13	9	10	35	27	+8	48	
9	MITOS Novocherkassk	32	13	6	13	47	47	0	45	
10	Biolog-Novokubansk Progress	32	12	9	11	41	38	+3	45	
11	Energiya Volzhsky	32	13	5	14	36	42	−6	44	
12	Slavyansky Slavyansk-na-Kubani	32	9	12	11	42	44	−2	39	
13	Druzhba Maykop	32	9	8	15	33	48	−15	35	
14	Kavkaztransgaz-2005 Ryzdvyany	32	6	10	16	34	50	−16	28	
15	Olimpia Volgograd	32	6	6	20	25	55	−30	24	
16	Volgar-Astrakhan Astrakhan	32	6	5	21	29	60	−31	23	
17	SKA Rostov-on-Don (R)	32	1	3	28	6	82	−76	6	Relegation to Amateur Football League

Source: rfspro.ru
Rules for classification: 1st points; 2nd matches won; 3rd head-to-head (points, matches won, goal difference, goals scored, away goals scored); 4th goal difference; 5th goals scored; 6th away goals scored
(P) Promoted; (R) Relegated

=== Top scorers ===
Source: rfspro.ru (in Russian)

16 goals

- Yuri Pugachyov (Astrakhan)

15 goals

- Magomed Guguyev (Angusht)
- Sergei Verkashanskiy (Torpedo)

12 goals

- Vyacheslav Bokov (MITOS)
- Anatoly Shevchenko (Torpedo / Chernomorets)

11 goals

- Sergei Sechin (Astrakhan)

10 goals

- Sergei Sinyayev (Astrakhan)

== Ural-Povolzhye ==
=== Standings ===
Pos	Team	Pld	W	D	L	GF	GA	GD	Pts	Promotion or relegation
1	Gazovik Orenburg (P)	28	21	6	1	54	15	+39	69	Promotion to Russian National Football League
2	Tyumen	28	20	6	2	56	15	+41	66	
3	Volga Ulyanovsk	28	15	7	6	37	17	+20	52	
4	Chelyabinsk	28	14	8	6	42	23	+19	50	
5	Lada-Togliatti Togliatti	28	13	9	6	39	28	+11	48	
6	Zenit-Izhevsk	28	14	5	9	47	37	+10	47	
7	Syzran-2003	28	11	9	8	34	21	+13	42	
8	Rubin-2 Kazan	28	9	8	11	29	35	−6	35	
9	Gornyak Uchaly	28	8	7	13	22	40	−18	31	
10	KAMAZ Naberezhnye Chelny	28	8	6	14	23	29	−6	30	
11	Dynamo Kirov	28	6	12	10	16	19	−3	30	
12	Nosta Novotroitsk	28	5	8	15	21	38	−17	23	
13	Oktan Perm	28	6	4	18	21	47	−26	22	
14	Akademiya Togliatti	28	5	5	18	16	57	−41	20	
15	Spartak Yoshkar-Ola (R)	28	2	6	20	26	62	−36	12	Relegation to Amateur Football League

Source: rfspro.ru
Rules for classification: 1st points; 2nd matches won; 3rd head-to-head (points, matches won, goal difference, goals scored, away goals scored); 4th goal difference; 5th goals scored; 6th away goals scored
(P) Promoted; (R) Relegated

=== Top scorers ===
Source: rfspro.ru (in Russian)

14 goals

- Dmitri Zarva (Chelyabinsk)

10 goals

- Sergei Dzodziyev (Lada-Togliatti)

9 goals

- Maksim Barsov (Volga)
- Vasili Panev (Zenit-Izhevsk)

8 goals

- Ruslan Galiakberov (Rubin-2)
- Sergei Serdyukov (Gazovik)

7 goals

- Vladislav Aksyutenko (Gazovik)
- Anton Kilin (Chelyabinsk)
- Khasan Mamtov (Tyumen)
- Sergei Titov (Spartak Yoshkar-Ola)

== East ==
=== Standings ===
Pos	Team	Pld	W	D	L	GF	GA	GD	Pts	Promotion or relegation
1	Luch-Energiya Vladivostok (P)	30	18	8	4	48	27	+21	62	Promotion to Russian National Football League
2	Chita	30	17	10	3	45	22	+23	61	
3	Amur-2010 Blagoveshchensk	30	15	10	5	50	21	+29	55	
4	Sakhalin Yuzhno-Sakhalinsk	30	15	9	6	42	26	+16	54	
5	Smena Komsomolsk-na-Amure	30	14	8	8	41	29	+12	50	
6	Dynamo Barnaul	30	9	10	11	41	44	−3	37	
7	Yakutiya Yakutsk	30	9	8	13	37	46	−9	35	
8	Baikal Irkutsk	30	8	4	18	36	61	−25	28	
9	Irtysh Omsk	30	5	9	16	37	62	−25	24	
10	Sibiryak Bratsk	30	5	8	17	27	50	−23	23	
11	Sibir-2 Novosibirsk (R)	30	5	6	19	33	49	−16	21	Relegation to Amateur Football League

Source: rfspro.ru
Rules for classification: 1st points; 2nd matches won; 3rd head-to-head (points, matches won, goal difference, goals scored, away goals scored); 4th goal difference; 5th goals scored; 6th away goals scored
(P) Promoted; (R) Relegated

=== Top scorers ===
Source: rfspro.ru (in Russian)

14 goals

- Andrei Polyanskiy (Dynamo)
- Aleksandr Tikhonovetsky (Luch-Energiya)

12 goals

- Anton Bagayev (Irtysh)
- Yevgeni Dudikov (Baikal)

11 goals

- Pavel Garannikov (Chita)

9 goals

- Stanislav Goncharov (Smena)

8 goals

- Aleksei Buznyakov (Amur-2010)
- Marat Sagirov (Luch-Energiya)
