= 2016–17 Russian Football National League =

Russian National Football League
- Season: 2016–17
- Champions: Dynamo Moscow
- Promoted: Dynamo Moscow; Tosno; SKA-Khabarovsk
- Relegated: Neftekhimik; Spartak Nalchik; Sokol Saratov; Mordovia Saransk
- Matches: 380
- Goals: 828 (2.18 per match)
- Top goalscorer: Kirill Panchenko (24 goals)
- Biggest home win: 5 goals: TYU 5–0 KHI (6 August 2016); DYN 5–0 VOL (6 August 2016)
- Biggest away win: 4 goals: YEN 0–4 SP2 (17 August 2016); ZEN 0–4 KUB (22 October 2016)
- Highest scoring: 6 goals: TOS 4–2 NEF (15 October 2016)
- All statistics correct as of 31 May 2017.

The 2016–17 Russian National Football League was the 25th season of Russia's second-tier football league since the dissolution of the Soviet Union. The season began on 11 July 2016 and ended on 19 May 2017.

== Teams ==
Team locations
Location of Moscow teams.

=== Stadiums, personnel and sponsorship ===
Team	Head coach	Captain	Kitmaker	Sponsor	Stadium	Capacity
Baltika	(Ukraine) Ihor Zakhariak	(Russia) Yevgeni Tsimbal	Nike	Sodruzhestvo	Baltika, Kaliningrad	14,660
Dynamo Moscow	(Ukraine) Yuriy Kalitvintsev	(Russia) Anton Shunin	Nike	VTB	Arena Khimki, Khimki	18,636
Fakel Voronezh	(Russia) Pavel Gusev	(Russia) Andrei Murnin	Adidas	TNS Energo	Tsentralnyi Profsoyuz, Voronezh	32,750
Khimki	(Russia) Aleksandr Irkhin	(Russia) Igor Chernyshov	Macron	-	Rodina Stadium, Khimki	5,083
Kuban Krasnodar	(Russia) Nikolai Yuzhanin	(Moldova) Igor Armaș	Adidas	-	Kuban Stadium, Krasnodar	35,200
Luch-Energiya	(Russia) Sergei Perednya	(Russia) Aleksei Rebko	Nike	-	Dynamo, Vladivostok	10,200
Mordovia	(Russia) Dmitri Cheryshev	(Russia) Renat Sabitov	Nike	-	Start Stadium, Saransk	11,613
Neftekhimik	(Russia) Rustem Khuzin	(Russia) Aleksandr Samokhvalov	Adidas	HXHK	Neftekhimik Stadium, Nizhnekamsk	3,200
Shinnik	(Russia) Aleksandr Pobegalov	(Russia) Eldar Nizamutdinov	Jako	-	Shinnik, Yaroslavl	22,990
Sibir	(Russia) Sergei Kirsanov	(Czech Republic) Tomáš Vychodil	Joma	-	Spartak, Novosibirsk	12,500
SKA-Khabarovsk	(Russia) Aleksandr Grigoryan	(Russia) Aleksandr Dimidko	Adidas	-	Lenin, Khabarovsk	15,200
Sokol	(Russia) Vadim Khafizov	(Russia) Vladimir Romanenko	Adidas	ZMK	Lokomotiv, Saratov	15,000
Spartak-2	(Russia) Yevgeny Bushmanov	(Russia) Artyom Samsonov	Nike	Lukoil	Spartak Academy, Moscow	2,700
Spartak Nalchik	(Russia) Khasanbi Bidzhiyev	(Russia) Amir Bazhev	Umbro	-	Spartak Stadium, Nalchik	14,149
Tambov	(Russia) Andrei Talalayev	(Russia) Aleksey Mikhalyov	2K Sport	TBS	Spartak Stadium, Tambov	5,000
Tosno	(Ukraine) Dmytro Parfyonov	(Russia) Guram Tetrashvili	Nike	Fort Group	Electron Stadium, Veliky Novgorod	3,223
Tyumen	(Russia) Aleksandr Ivchenko	(Russia) Khasan Mamtov	Jako	Sibur	Geolog, Tyumen	13,057
Volgar	(Russia) Yuri Gazzayev	(Russia) Elbrus Zurayev	Adidas	Gazprom	Tsentralny, Astrakhan	17,712
Yenisey	(Russia) Andrey Tikhonov	(Russia) Mikhail Komkov	Nike	-	Tsentralny, Krasnoyarsk	22,500
Zenit-2	(Russia) Vladislav Radimov	(Russia) Konstantin Zyryanov	Nike	Gazprom	MSA Petrovsky, Saint Petersburg	2,809

== League table ==
Pos	Team	Pld	W	D	L	GF	GA	GD	Pts	Promotion, qualification or relegation
1	Dynamo Moscow (C, P)	38	26	9	3	64	25	+39	87	Promotion to Premier League
2	Tosno (P)	38	21	12	5	63	30	+33	75	Promotion to Premier League
3	Yenisey Krasnoyarsk	38	19	6	13	54	42	+12	63	Qualification to Premier League play-offs
4	SKA-Khabarovsk (O, P)	38	15	14	9	45	33	+12	59	Qualification to Premier League play-offs
5	Tambov	38	15	12	11	42	34	+8	57	
6	Spartak-2 Moscow	38	15	11	12	56	43	+13	56	Ineligible for promotion
7	Kuban Krasnodar	38	14	13	11	44	37	+7	55	
8	Shinnik Yaroslavl	38	15	9	14	41	39	+2	54	
9	Tyumen	38	14	11	13	48	43	+5	53 (Note: Tyumen is ahead of Fakel on head-to-head points: Tyumen 3–1 Fakel, Fakel 1–1 Tyumen.)	
10	Fakel Voronezh	38	14	11	13	38	40	−2	53	
11	Khimki	38	11	16	11	40	47	−7	49	
12	Volgar Astrakhan	38	12	9	17	39	49	−10	45	
13	Zenit-2 Saint Petersburg	38	9	16	13	44	51	−7	43	Ineligible for promotion
14	Baltika Kaliningrad	38	9	15	14	25	35	−10	42 (Note: Head-to-head points: Baltika 4 pts, Sibir 4 pts, Luch-Energiya 4 pts. Baltika is ahead of Sibir and Luch on head-to-head goals scored: Baltika 3, Sibir 2, Luch-Energiya 1.)	
15	Sibir Novosibirsk	38	9	15	14	31	46	−15	42	
16	Luch-Energiya Vladivostok (Note: The league confirmed on 9 June 2017 that FC Chita, which won the East zone of the 2016–17 Russian Professional Football League, did not apply for the FNL license for the 2017–18 season. According to the league regulations, Luch-Energiya was not relegated.)	38	9	15	14	27	41	−14	42	
17	Mordovia Saransk (R)	38	11	7	20	39	50	−11	40	Relegation to Professional Football League
18	Sokol Saratov (R)	38	8	15	15	34	53	−19	39	Relegation to Professional Football League
19	Spartak Nalchik (R)	38	7	17	14	26	37	−11	38	Relegation to Professional Football League
20	Neftekhimik Nizhnekamsk (R)	38	6	9	23	28	53	−25	27	Relegation to Professional Football League

Source: Football National League (Russian), Soccerway
Rules for classification: 1) Points; 2) Matches won; 3) Head-to-head points; 4) Head-to-head matches won; 5) Head-to-head goal difference; 6) Head-to-head goals scored; 7) Head-to-head away goals; 8) Goal difference; 9) Goals scored; 10) Away goals scored.
(C) Champions; (O) Play-off winners; (P) Promoted; (R) Relegated

== Results ==
Home \ Away	BAL	DYN	FAK	KHI	KUB	LUE	MOR	NEF	SHI	SIB	SKA	SOK	SP2	SPN	TAM	TOS	TYU	VOL	YEN	ZE2
Baltika Kaliningrad		0–3	0–0	0–0	0–1	0–0	1–2	0–0	1–0	1–1	0–0	1–0	1–2	1–1	1–2	0–2	1–0	1–0	0–1	0–0
Dynamo Moscow	2–1		0–1	0–0	1–0	3–2	2–1	3–1	1–0	1–0	3–2	1–1	2–1	1–1	3–0	0–1	3–0	5–0	2–2	0–0
Fakel Voronezh	1–2	2–1		2–0	2–2	0–1	1–2	3–2	1–0	2–0	0–0	1–2	1–1	1–0	3–0	0–0	0–0	0–1	0–3	1–0
Khimki	1–0	0–0	0–0		4–1	2–2	4–3	3–2	3–0	1–1	0–0	0–0	1–0	2–0	0–0	1–3	3–2	1–1	2–2	2–1
Kuban Krasnodar	1–1	0–1	0–0	2–1		1–1	2–0	1–0	0–1	1–1	0–2	0–0	5–2	3–1	0–0	1–1	3–1	1–0	2–1	3–0
Luch-Energiya Vladivostok	1–1	0–2	0–2	2–0	2–1		1–0	1–0	1–0	0–0	0–2	0–3	0–0	0–0	0–1	1–1	1–3	2–2	0–2	0–0
Mordovia Saransk	0–1	0–1	2–0	5–0	1–3	1–1		1–0	1–0	0–0	0–2	0–0	1–4	1–0	0–0	0–2	1–1	3–0	1–2	2–2
Neftekhimik Nizhnekamsk	0–0	0–1	1–2	1–0	1–4	1–1	1–0		1–2	0–1	0–0	2–2	0–1	0–1	1–1	0–2	0–1	2–0	0–2	1–0
Shinnik Yaroslavl	0–1	2–3	0–2	2–0	0–1	3–1	1–0	2–1		3–0	1–0	1–0	4–0	0–0	2–1	0–0	0–0	1–1	4–2	1–2
Sibir Novosibirsk	1–1	1–3	1–1	1–0	0–0	0–0	1–0	2–1	1–1		0–0	1–0	2–1	1–0	2–0	0–1	1–2	2–0	1–1	1–1
SKA-Khabarovsk	1–0	2–3	1–1	1–1	5–0	0–1	1–3	1–0	0–0	2–0		1–1	3–0	0–0	2–2	1–0	1–0	2–1	1–0	1–0
Sokol Saratov	1–0	0–3	2–1	1–0	0–0	1–0	0–0	1–2	2–2	1–1	2–3		0–4	2–1	1–4	1–2	1–0	0–0	0–3	0–3
Spartak-2 Moscow	1–2	1–1	1–0	4–0	1–0	3–0	2–0	0–0	1–2	0–0	2–0	3–2		0–0	1–2	1–3	2–3	0–0	3–1	4–1
Spartak Nalchik	0–0	0–1	1–2	1–1	0–0	0–1	1–3	3–2	2–0	2–1	1–1	1–1	1–1		0–1	1–1	1–1	1–2	1–0	1–0
Tambov	0–1	1–2	4–0	0–1	0–0	1–0	2–1	0–0	0–1	3–2	3–1	0–0	1–0	0–0		3–0	0–1	3–0	1–0	0–0
Tosno	4–1	1–2	3–1	1–1	0–0	1–2	1–0	4–2	0–0	3–0	3–1	5–2	1–1	0–0	2–0		2–2	3–0	1–2	4–1
Tyumen	2–2	0–2	3–1	1–1	2–0	0–0	2–1	2–0	5–1	3–1	1–3	1–1	1–1	3–0	0–0	1–2		1–0	2–3	1–0
Volgar Astrakhan	1–0	0–1	1–2	1–1	2–1	3–2	1–2	3–0	2–0	4–0	0–0	2–1	1–1	2–1	1–2	0–1	2–0		0–0	4–3
Yenisey Krasnoyarsk	2–1	0–0	2–0	3–0	2–0	0–0	4–0	0–1	1–3	3–2	3–1	3–1	0–4	0–1	2–1	0–1	2–0	1–0		0–3
Zenit-2 St. Petersburg	1–1	1–1	1–1	1–3	0–4	1–0	3–1	2–2	1–1	3–1	1–1	1–1	1–2	1–1	3–3	1–1	1–0	2–1	2–0	

Source: Soccerway
Legend: Blue = home team win; Yellow = draw; Red = away team win.

== Statistics ==
=== Scoring ===
- First goal of the season: Vadim Minich for Luch-Energiya against Mordovia Saransk (11 July 2016)

=== Top goalscorers ===
Rank	Player	Club	Goals
1	(Russia) Kirill Panchenko	Dynamo Moscow	24
2	(Russia) Khasan Mamtov	Tyumen	23
3	(Russia) Anton Zabolotny	Tosno	16
4	(Russia) Denis Davydov	Spartak-2	13
5	(Armenia) Ruslan Koryan	SKA-Khabarovsk	12
6	(Russia) Georgi Melkadze	Spartak-2	11
7	(Russia) Spartak Gogniyev	Kuban	10
7	(Russia) Artyom Fedchuk	Spartak-2	10
7	(Russia) Sergey Samodin	Yenisey	10
10	(Montenegro) Fatos Bećiraj	Dynamo Moscow	9
10	(Moldova) Eugeniu Cebotaru	Sibir	9
10	(Russia) Danil Klenkin	Tyumen	9
10	(Russia) Aleksei Sutormin	Volgar	9

Last updated: 21 May 2017
