= Aleksey Mikhalyov (footballer) =

Russian footballer and official

Aleksei Mikhalyov
Personal information
- Full name: Aleksei Nikolayevich Mikhalyov
- Date of birth: 18 September 1983 (age 43)
- Place of birth: Tambov, Russian SFSR
- Height: 1.88 m (6 ft 2 in)
- Positions: Defender; midfielder

Youth career
- DYuSSh-4 Tambov

Senior career*
Years	Team	Apps	(Gls)
2004	FC Spartak Tambov	1	(0)
2005	FC Sportakademklub Moscow	14	(1)
2005	FC Chkalovets-1936 Novosibirsk	0	(0)
2006	FC Gubkin	24	(4)
2007–2009	FC Vityaz Podolsk	44	(7)
2009	→ FC Gubkin (loan)	26	(4)
2010	FC Gubkin	13	(1)
2010–2013	FC Fakel Voronezh	82	(6)
2013	FC Avangard Kursk	15	(0)
2014–2018	FC Tambov	87	(3)

Managerial career
- 2019–2021: FC Tambov (administrator)
- * Club domestic league appearances and goals

Aleksei Nikolayevich Mikhalyov (Russian: Алексей Николаевич Михалёв; born 18 September 1983) is a Russian professional football official and a former player.

== Club career ==
He played 4 seasons in the Russian Football National League for FC Vityaz Podolsk, FC Fakel Voronezh and FC Tambov.
