= Vladimir Sugrobov =

Russian footballer

Personal information
- Full name: Vladimir Vladimirovich Sugrobov
- Date of birth: 10 September 1996 (age 30)
- Place of birth: Saratov, Russia
- Height: 1.86 m (6 ft 1 in)
- Position: Goalkeeper

Team information
- Current team: Rotor Volgograd
- Number: 1

Youth career
- Sokol Saratov

Senior career*
Years	Team	Apps	(Gls)
2015–2017	Sokol Saratov	2	(0)
2017	Ararat Moscow	15	(0)
2018–2019	Anzhi Makhachkala	0	(0)
2019	Baltika Kaliningrad	0	(0)
2019–2020	Tambov	0	(0)
2020	→ Pyunik (loan)	3	(0)
2020–2024	SKA-Khabarovsk	65	(0)
2024–2025	Arsenal Tula	0	(0)
2025	→ Chelyabinsk (loan)	10	(0)
2025–	Rotor Volgograd	0	(0)
- * Club domestic league appearances and goals as of 16 May 2026

Vladimir Vladimirovich Sugrobov (Russian: Владимир Владимирович Сугробов; born 10 September 1996) is a Russian football player who plays as a goalkeeper for Rotor Volgograd.

== Career ==
=== Club ===
Sugrobov made his debut in the Russian Football National League for FC Sokol Saratov on 21 August 2016 in a game against FC Khimki.

He made his debut for FC Anzhi Makhachkala early in the first leg 2017–18 Russian Premier League relegation play-off game against FC Yenisey Krasnoyarsk as the first- and second-choice goalkeepers of Anzhi were injured.

On 10 February 2019, Anzhi Makhachkala announced that Sugrobov had left the club to join Baltika Kaliningrad.

On 1 June 2019, he joined Russian Premier League club Tambov.

On 17 January 2020, Sugrobov joined FC Pyunik on loan for the remainder of the 2019–20 season.

On 27 July 2020, he signed a 1-year contract with SKA-Khabarovsk.

== Career statistics ==
=== Club ===
As of match played 28 June 2020

Appearances and goals by club, season and competition
Club	Season	League			National Cup		League Cup		Continental		Other		Total	
Club	Season	Division	Apps	Goals	Apps	Goals	Apps	Goals	Apps	Goals	Apps	Goals	Apps	Goals
Sokol Saratov	2015–16	Football National League	0	0	0	0	–		–		–		0	0
Sokol Saratov	2016–17	Football National League	2	0	0	0	–		–		–		2	0
Sokol Saratov	Total		2	0	0	0	-	-	-	-	-	-	2	0
Ararat Moscow	2017–18	Professional Football League	15	0	1	0	–		–		–		16	0
Anzhi Makhachkala	2017–18	Russian Premier League	0	0	0	0	–		–		2	0	2	0
Anzhi Makhachkala	2018–19	Russian Premier League	0	0	0	0	–		–		–		0	0
Anzhi Makhachkala	Total		0	0	0	0	-	-	-	-	2	0	2	0
Baltika Kaliningrad	2018–19	Football National League	0	0	0	0	–		–		–		0	0
Tambov	2019–20	Russian Premier League	0	0	1	0	–		–		–		1	0
Pyunik	2019–20	Armenian Premier League	3	0	0	0	–		0	0	–		3	0
Career total			20	0	2	0	-	-	-	-	2	0	24	0
