= Soslan Takazov =

Russian footballer

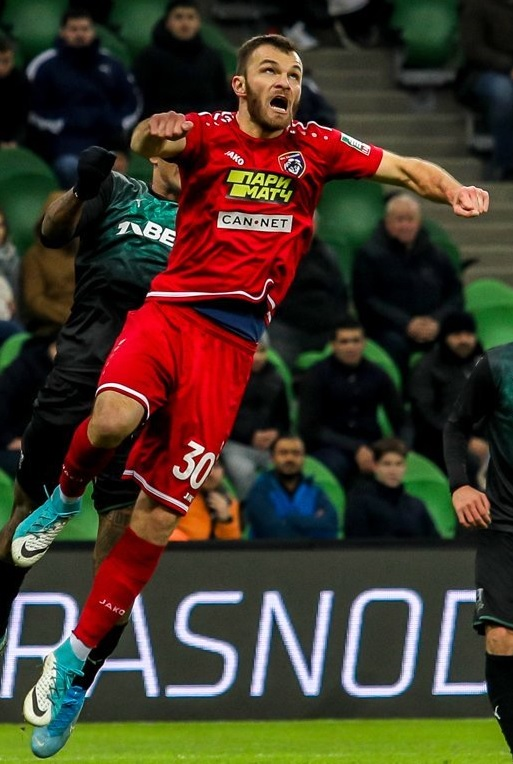
- Takazov with FC Tambov in 2019

Personal information
- Full name: Soslan Valeryevich Takazov
- Date of birth: 28 February 1993 (age 33)
- Place of birth: Lesken, North Ossetia–Alania, Russia
- Height: 1.86 m (6 ft 1 in)
- Position: Centre-back

Youth career
- FC Dynamo Moscow

Senior career*
Years	Team	Apps	(Gls)
2011–2012	FC Alania Vladikavkaz	14	(0)
2012–2013	→ FC Alania-d Vladikavkaz	26	(3)
2014–2017	FC Amkar Perm	10	(1)
2015–2016	→ FC Tyumen (loan)	28	(1)
2017	→ FC Volgar Astrakhan (loan)	13	(1)
2017	FC Volgar Astrakhan	14	(0)
2018	FC Luch-Energiya Vladivostok	11	(1)
2018	FC Baltika Kaliningrad	23	(2)
2019	FC Armavir	10	(0)
2019–2020	FC Tambov	25	(1)
2021–2025	FC Kuban Krasnodar	82	(4)
2025	FC Amkar Perm	23	(1)

International career
2011	Russia U-18	6	(1)
- * Club domestic league appearances and goals as of 19 October 2025

Soslan Valeryevich Takazov (Russian: Сослан Валерьевич Таказов; born 28 February 1993) is a Russian football defender.

== Club career ==
He made his senior competitive debut for FC Alania Vladikavkaz on 25 August 2011 in the return leg of Europa League qualifier against Beşiktaş, when he had to substitute injured Aslan Dudiyev in the 20th minute. Alania won 2–0 but lost 2–3 on aggregate.

He made his debut in the Russian Football National League for Alania on 29 August 2011 in a game against FC Shinnik Yaroslavl.

He made his Russian Premier League debut for FC Amkar Perm on 4 August 2014 in a game against FC Terek Grozny. After regularly starting for Amkar in the first half of the 2014–15 Russian Premier League season, he was moved to the Under-21 squad after the winter break.

He spent the next 4 seasons in the FNL.

On 26 May 2019, he signed with FC Tambov which was just promoted to the Russian Premier League.

== Career statistics ==
As of 5 July 2014

Club	Season	League		Cup		Europe		Total	
Club	Season	Apps	Goals	Apps	Goals	Apps	Goals	Apps	Goals
Alania	2011-12	7	0	0	0	1	0	8	0
Alania-d	2012-13	26	3	4	1	—		30	4
Alania	2013-14	7	0	1	0	—		8	0
Amkar	2013-14	0	0	0	0	—		0	0
Career total		40	3	5	1	1	0	46	4
