= Guram Tetrashvili =

Russian footballer

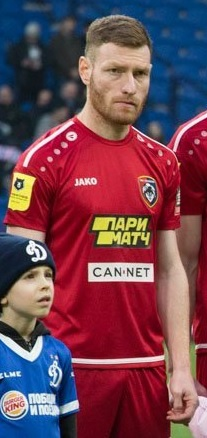
- Tetrashvili with Tambov in 2020

Personal information
- Full name: Guram Georgiyevich Tetrashvili
- Date of birth: 2 August 1988 (age 38)
- Place of birth: Ordzhonikidze, Russian SFSR
- Height: 1.78 m (5 ft 10 in)
- Position: Defensive midfielder

Senior career*
Years	Team	Apps	(Gls)
2007–2010	Avtodor Vladikavkaz	94	(2)
2011–2012	Alania-d Vladikavkaz	29	(0)
2012–2013	Mashuk-KMV Pyatigorsk	26	(0)
2013–2014	Luch-Energiya Vladivostok	25	(0)
2015–2016	Tosno	50	(2)
2017–2018	Anzhi Makhachkala	36	(0)
2019	Gomel	13	(0)
2019–2020	Tambov	37	(0)
2021–2022	Okzhetpes	28	(2)
- * Club domestic league appearances and goals as of 31 December 2022

Guram Tetrashvili (Russian: Гурам Георгиевич Тетрашвили; born 2 August 1988) is a Russian former professional football player of Georgian ethnic origin. He primarily played as defensive midfielder or right back.

== Club career ==
He left FC Anzhi Makhachkala by mutual consent on 25 November 2018.

On 9 March 2019, Tetrashvili signed for FC Gomel.

On 4 July 2019, he returned to the Russian Premier League, joining Tambov.

== Career statistics ==
=== Club ===
As of 25 November 2018

Club	Season	League			Cup		Continental		Other		Total	
Club	Season	Division	Apps	Goals	Apps	Goals	Apps	Goals	Apps	Goals	Apps	Goals
Avtodor Vladikavkaz	2007	PFL	13	0	0	0	–		–		13	0
Avtodor Vladikavkaz	2008	PFL	27	0	2	0	–		–		29	0
Avtodor Vladikavkaz	2009	PFL	30	1	2	0	–		–		32	1
Avtodor Vladikavkaz	2010	PFL	24	1	2	0	–		–		26	1
Avtodor Vladikavkaz	Total		94	2	6	0	0	0	0	0	100	2
Alania-d Vladikavkaz	2011–12	PFL	29	0	1	0	–		–		30	0
Mashuk-KMV Pyatigorsk	2012–13	PFL	26	0	1	0	–		–		27	0
Luch-Energiya Vladivostok	2013–14	FNL	16	0	1	0	–		–		17	0
Luch-Energiya Vladivostok	2014–15	FNL	9	0	1	0	–		–		10	0
Luch-Energiya Vladivostok	Total		25	0	2	0	0	0	0	0	27	0
Tosno	2014–15	FNL	12	0	–		–		2 (Note: Two appearances in promotion play-offs)	0	14	0
Tosno	2015–16	FNL	26	0	3	0	–		–		29	0
Tosno	2016–17	FNL	12	2	1	0	–		–		13	2
Tosno	Total		50	2	4	0	0	0	2	0	56	2
Anzhi Makhachkala	2016–17	Russian Premier League	10	0	1	0	–		–		11	0
Anzhi Makhachkala	2017–18	Russian Premier League	22	0	0	0	–		2 (Note: Two appearances in relegation play-offs)	0	24	0
Anzhi Makhachkala	2018–19	Russian Premier League	4	0	0	0	–		–		4	0
Anzhi Makhachkala	Total		36	0	1	0	0	0	2	0	39	0
Career total			260	4	15	0	0	0	4	0	279	4
