= Aleksey Averyanov =

Russian professional football player

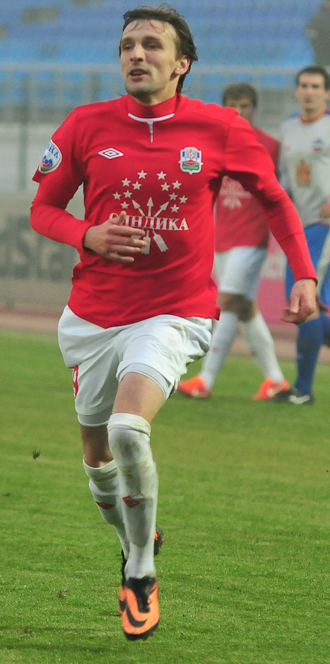

Personal information
- Full name: Aleksey Anatolyevich Averyanov
- Date of birth: 28 May 1985 (age 41)
- Place of birth: Moscow, Soviet Union
- Height: 1.79 m (5 ft 10 in)
- Positions: Midfielder; forward

Youth career
- PFC CSKA Moscow
- SDYuShOR-63 Smena Moscow

Senior career*
Years	Team	Apps	(Gls)
2003–2004	FC Smena Moscow		
2005	FC Torpedo-RG Moscow (amateur)		
2006–2008	FC Torpedo-RG Moscow	90	(9)
2009	FC Gubkin	20	(2)
2010	FC Podolye Podolsky district (amateur)		
2011–2013	FC Podolye Podolsky district	43	(16)
2013	PFC Spartak Nalchik	29	(5)
2014–2015	FC Luch-Energiya Vladivostok	31	(6)
2015–2016	FC Tambov	28	(4)
2017	FC Sochi	7	(0)
2017–2019	FC Prialit Reutov		
- * Club domestic league appearances and goals

Aleksey Anatolyevich Averyanov (Russian: Алексей Анатольевич Аверьянов; born 28 May 1986) is a Russian former professional football player. Averyanov played striker and midfielder positions.

== Club career ==
He played 4 seasons in the Russian Football National League for PFC Spartak Nalchik, FC Luch-Energiya Vladivostok and FC Tambov.
