= Lazutkin =

Lazutkin (Russian: Лазуткин, Ukrainian: Лазуткін), fem. Lazutkina is a surname. Notable people with the surname include:

- Aleksandr Lazutkin (born 1957), Russian cosmonaut
- Anton Lazutkin (born 1994), Russian football player
- Dmytro Lazutkin (born 1978), Ukrainian writer
- Maksim Lazutkin (born 1999), Russian football player
- Yulia Lazutkina (born 1981), Russian politician
