= Yevgeni Kazadayev =

Russian footballer

Personal information
- Full name: Yevgeni Aleksandrovich Kazadayev
- Date of birth: 13 March 1996 (age 30)
- Place of birth: Tambov, Russia
- Height: 1.85 m (6 ft 1 in)
- Position: Midfielder

Senior career*
Years	Team	Apps	(Gls)
2013	FC Pritambovye Tambov		
2014	FC Akademiya Futbola Tambov Oblast		
2015–2016	FC Tambov-M		
2017–2018	FC Tambov	1	(0)
- * Club domestic league appearances and goals

Yevgeni Aleksandrovich Kazadayev (Russian: Евгений Александрович Казадаев; born 13 March 1996) is a Russian former football player.

== Club career ==
He made his debut in the Russian Football National League for FC Tambov on 22 July 2017 in a game against FC Spartak-2 Moscow.
