= Khetag Khosonov =

Russian footballer

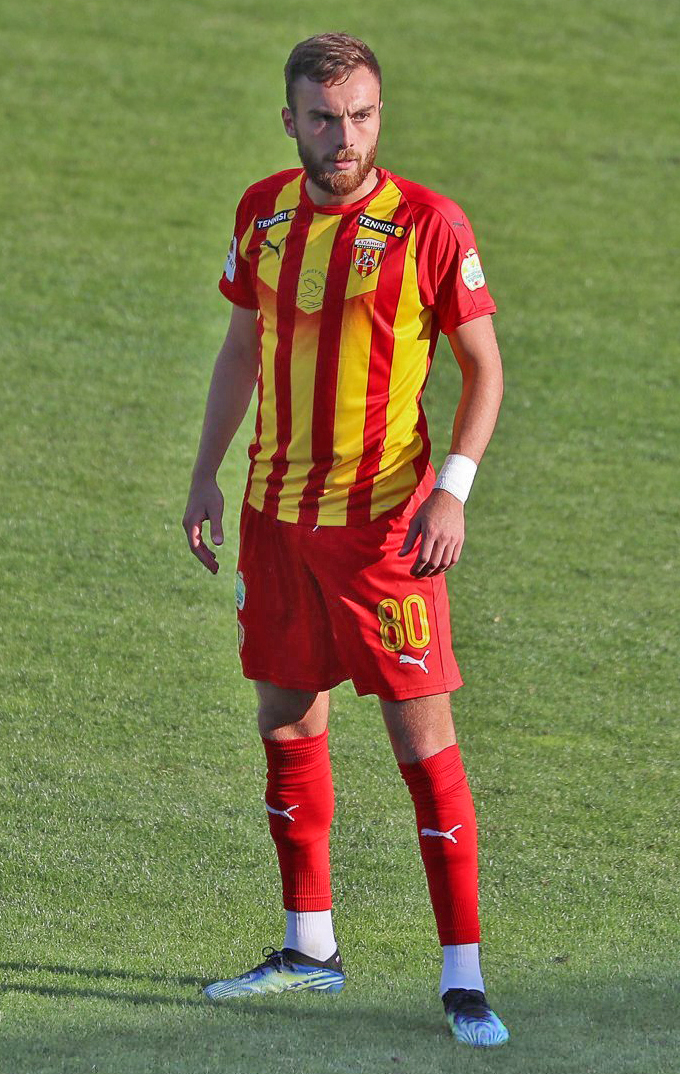
- Khosonov with Alania in 2021

Personal information
- Full name: Khetag Muratovich Khosonov
- Date of birth: 18 June 1998 (age 28)
- Place of birth: Vladikavkaz, Russia
- Height: 1.85 m (6 ft 1 in)
- Position: Midfielder

Team information
- Current team: Akron Tolyatti
- Number: 80

Youth career
- 2005–2014: SDYuSShOR Yunost Vladikavkaz
- 2014–2016: CSKA Moscow

Senior career*
Years	Team	Apps	(Gls)
2016–2020	CSKA Moscow	10	(0)
2019–2020	→ Tambov (loan)	15	(0)
2020–2023	Alania Vladikavkaz	99	(6)
2023–2024	Khimki	45	(8)
2025	Torpedo Moscow	12	(1)
2025–	Akron Tolyatti	36	(0)

International career^{‡}
2016	Russia U-18	3	(0)
2016	Russia U-19	5	(0)
- * Club domestic league appearances and goals as of 21 November 2026 ‡ National team caps and goals as of 11 October 2016

Khetag Muratovich Khosonov (Russian: Хетаг Муратович Хосонов; born 18 June 1998) is a Russian football player who plays as a defensive midfielder for Akron Tolyatti.

== Club career ==
He made his debut for the main squad of CSKA Moscow in the Russian Cup game against Yenisey Krasnoyarsk on 21 September 2016.

He made his Russian Premier League debut for CSKA on 8 September 2017 in a game against Amkar Perm.

On 27 July 2018, he scored the only goal of the game in extra time to win the 2018 Russian Super Cup for CSKA.

On 25 January 2019 he joined Tambov on loan until the end of the 2018–19 season. On 5 July 2019, the loan was extended for the 2019–20 season. On 1 June 2020 his loan term has expired and he left Tambov.

On 31 July 2020, he moved to his hometown club Alania Vladikavkaz.

On 27 November 2024, in a Russian Cup game between Khosonov's club Khimki and Ural Yekaterinburg, Khimki goalkeeper Igor Obukhov was sent off for a professional foul in added time. As Khimki already used all allowed substitutions at the time, Khosonov had to act as a goalkeeper for the remaining game time, and then for the subsequent penalty shoot-out, as the game ended in a 1–1 draw. In the shoot-out, Khosonov did not save any Ural shots, and then hit the goalpost when he took Khimki's fifth penalty kick, and Ural won the shoot-out.

On 10 January 2025, Khosonov signed with Torpedo Moscow.

On 18 July 2025, Khosonov joined Akron Tolyatti.

== Career statistics ==
=== Club ===
As of match played 21 November 2026

Appearances and goals by club, season and competition
Club	Season	League			National Cup		Continental		Other		Total	
Club	Season	Division	Apps	Goals	Apps	Goals	Apps	Goals	Apps	Goals	Apps	Goals
CSKA Moscow	2016–17	Russian Premier League	0	0	1	0	0	0	0	0	1	0
CSKA Moscow	2017–18	Russian Premier League	5	0	1	0	2 (Note: One appearance in the UEFA Champions League, one appearance in the UEFA Europa League)	0	—		8	0
CSKA Moscow	2018–19	Russian Premier League	5	0	0	0	2 (Note: Appearances in the UEFA Champions League)	0	1 (Note: Appearance in the Russian Super Cup)	1	8	1
CSKA Moscow	2019–20	Russian Premier League	0	0	0	0	0	0	—		0	0
CSKA Moscow	Total		10	0	2	0	4	0	0	1	17	1
Tambov (loan)	2018–19	Russian First League	7	0	0	0	—		5 (Note: Appearances in the FNL Cup)	0	12	0
Tambov (loan)	2019–20	Russian Premier League	8	0	0	0	—		—		8	0
Tambov (loan)	Total		15	0	0	0	0	0	5	0	20	0
Alania Vladikavkaz	2020–21	Russian First League	34	4	1	0	—		—		35	4
Alania Vladikavkaz	2021–22	Russian First League	34	1	5	1	—		—		39	2
Alania Vladikavkaz	2022–23	Russian First League	31	1	0	0	—		—		31	1
Alania Vladikavkaz	Total		99	6	6	1	0	0	0	0	105	7
Khimki	2023–24	Russian First League	28	7	5	2	—		—		33	9
Khimki	2024–25	Russian Premier League	17	1	3	0	—		—		20	1
Khimki	Total		45	8	8	2	—		—		53	10
Torpedo Moscow	2024–25	Russian First League	12	1	0	0	—		—		12	1
Akron Tolyatti	2025–26	Russian Premier League	23	0	4	0	—		2 (Note: Appearance in relegation play-offs)	0	29	0
Akron Tolyatti	2026–27	Russian Premier League	13	0	5	0	—		—		18	0
Akron Tolyatti	Total		36	0	9	0	—		2	0	47	0
Career total			217	15	25	3	4	0	8	1	254	19

== Honours ==
=== Club ===
CSKA Moscow

- Russian Super Cup: 2018
