= Vadim Minich =

Russian footballer

Personal information
- Full name: Vadim Dmitriyevich Minich
- Date of birth: 7 October 1986 (age 40)
- Place of birth: Dyatkovo, Bryansk Oblast, Russian SFSR
- Height: 1.68 m (5 ft 6 in)
- Positions: Midfielder; forward

Senior career*
Years	Team	Apps	(Gls)
2004	FC Dynamo Bryansk	0	(0)
2007–2008	FC Rotor Volgograd	42	(9)
2008–2009	FC Gubkin	41	(5)
2011–2012	FC Metallurg-Oskol Stary Oskol	38	(5)
2012–2013	FC Gubkin	25	(2)
2013–2014	FC Dynamo Bryansk	29	(10)
2014–2015	FC Kaluga	24	(10)
2015	FC SKA-Energiya Khabarovsk	5	(2)
2016	FC Tambov	9	(0)
2016–2017	FC Luch-Energiya Vladivostok	26	(3)
- * Club domestic league appearances and goals

Vadim Dmitriyevich Minich (Russian: Вадим Дмитриевич Минич; born 7 October 1986) is a former Russian professional football player.

== Club career ==
He played two seasons in the Russian Football National League for FC SKA-Energiya Khabarovsk and FC Luch-Energiya Vladivostok.
