= Sergei Pervushin =

Russian footballer

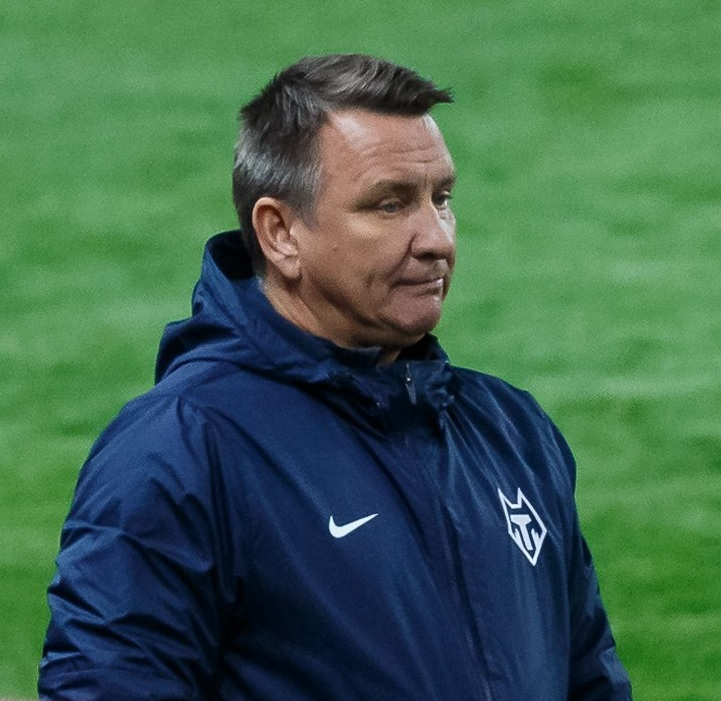
- Pervushin coaching FC Tambov in 2020

Personal information
- Full name: Sergei Aleksandrovich Pervushin
- Date of birth: 29 March 1970 (age 56)
- Place of birth: Russia
- Height: 1.78 m (5 ft 10 in)
- Positions: Forward; midfielder

Senior career*
| Years | Team | Apps | (Gls) |
| 1988–1991 | FC Spartak Tambov | 91 | (16) |
| 1991–1992 | FC Spartak Anapa | 28 | (2) |
| 1992–1994 | BFC Siófok | 7 | (2) |
| 1994–1995 | FC Metallurg Lipetsk | 75 | (9) |
| 1996–1999 | FC Spartak Tambov | 132 | (61) |
| 2000–2002 | FC SKA-Energiya Khabarovsk | 60 | (20) |
| 2002–2003 | FC Metallurg-ZapSib Novokuznetsk | 14 | (3) |
| 2003–2004 | FC Spartak Tambov | 34 | (27) |
| 2004–2005 | FC Dynamo Vologda | 16 | (6) |
| 2005–2006 | FC Spartak Tambov | 28 | (0) |

Managerial career
- 2008: FC Spartak Tambov (director)
- 2013: FC Tambov
- 2016–2019: FC Tambov (assistant)
- 2019–2020: FC Tambov (caretaker)
- 2020–2021: FC Tambov
- 2021: FC Kuban Krasnodar
- 2022: FC Metallurg Lipetsk (assistant)
- 2022–2023: FC Metallurg Lipetsk
- 2023–2024: FC Chayka Peschanokopskoye (assistant)
- 2025: FC Chayka Peschanokopskoye
- 2025: FC Chernomorets Novorossiysk
- * Club domestic league appearances and goals

Sergei Aleksandrovich Pervushin (Russian: Серге́й Александрович Первушин; born 29 March 1970) is a Russian professional football coach and a former player.

== Coaching career ==
On 21 October 2019 he was appointed caretaker manager of Russian Premier League club FC Tambov following the dismissal of Aleksandr Grigoryan, with Tambov in last place in the standings. On 28 May 2020, he signed a contract for the 2020–21 season as a manager of Tambov, with Tambov up to 11th position at the time. FC Tambov was dissolved after the 2020–21 season.

On 22 June 2021, he was appointed manager of FC Kuban Krasnodar, newly promoted into the Russian Football National League. He left Kuban by mutual consent on 12 August 2021.

== Honours ==
- Russian Second Division top scorer: 2000 (Zone East, 13 goals), 2003 (Zone Center, 27 goals).
