= Andrei Chasovskikh =

Russian football forward

Personal information
- Full name: Andrei Yuryevich Chasovskikh
- Date of birth: 31 May 1991 (age 35)
- Place of birth: Tambov, Russian SFSR
- Height: 1.86 m (6 ft 1 in)
- Position: Forward

Team information
- Current team: Spartak Tambov
- Number: 15

Youth career
- 2009–2010: Krylia Sovetov
- 2011–2012: FC Akademiya Futbola Tambov Oblast

Senior career*
Years	Team	Apps	(Gls)
2013–2020	Tambov	123	(26)
2016	→ Vityaz Podolsk (loan)	5	(1)
2018–2019	→ Luch Vladivostok (loan)	22	(0)
2020	→ Aktobe (loan)	9	(1)
2021	Kuban Krasnodar	18	(3)
2023–	Spartak Tambov	89	(25)
- * Club domestic league appearances and goals as of 31 October 2026

Andrei Yuryevich Chasovskikh (Russian: Андрей Юрьевич Часовских; born 31 May 1991) is a Russian football forward who plays for Spartak Tambov.

== Club career ==
He made his debut in the Russian Second Division for FC Tambov on 16 July 2013 in a game against FC Oryol.

He made his Russian Premier League debut for FC Tambov on 31 August 2019 in a game against FC Akhmat Grozny, as a 65th-minute substitute for Anton Kilin.

On 21 February 2020, Chasovskikh joined Aktobe on loan until the end of 2020.
