= Vladimir Obukhov =

Russian footballer

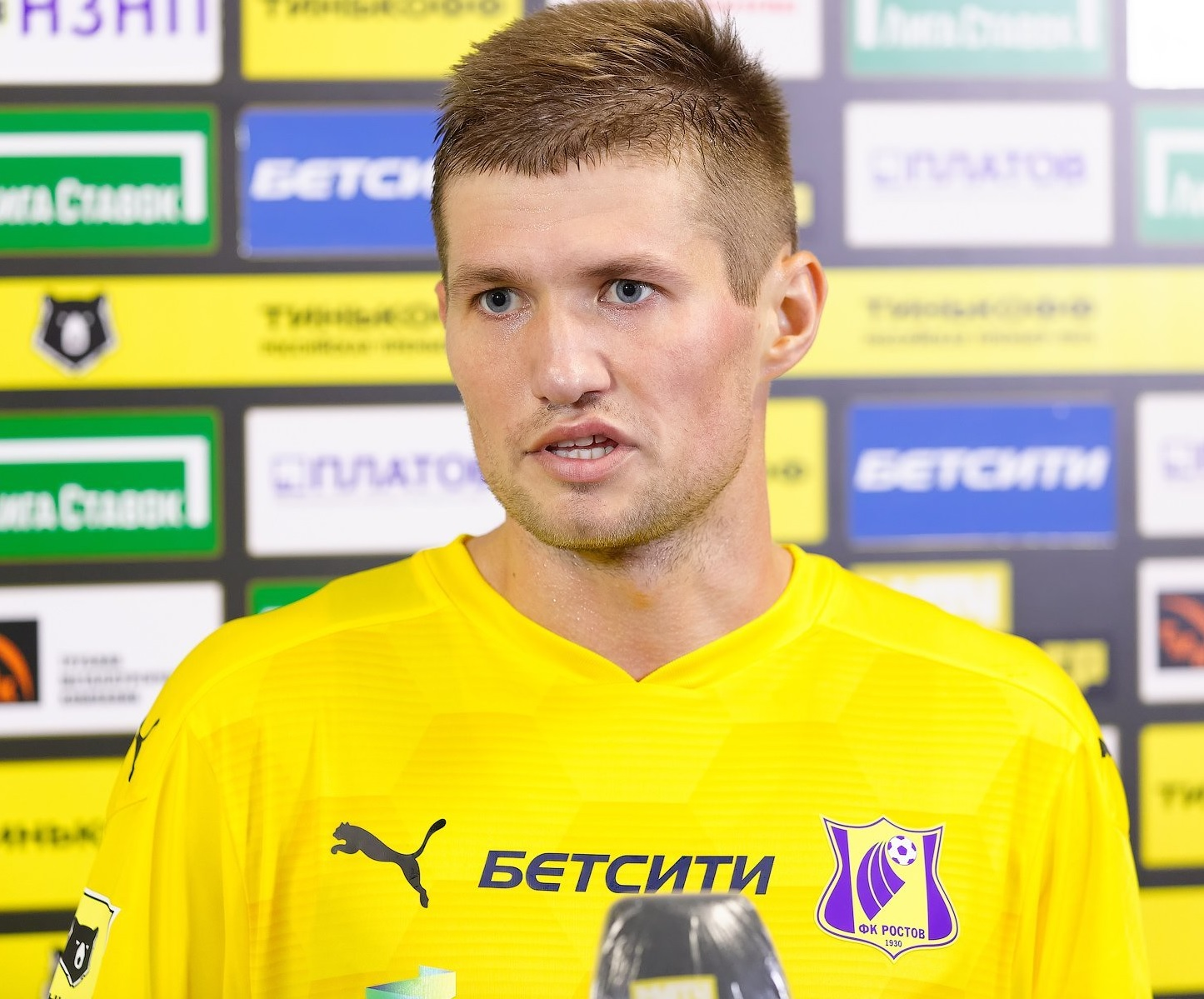
- Obukhov with Rostov in 2020

Personal information
- Full name: Vladimir Borisovich Obukhov
- Date of birth: 8 February 1992 (age 34)
- Place of birth: Bukhara, Uzbekistan
- Height: 1.84 m (6 ft 0 in)
- Position: Forward

Youth career
- 2001–2003: Uralets Nizhny Tagil
- 2003–2015: Spartak Moscow

Senior career*
Years	Team	Apps	(Gls)
2011–2014	Spartak Moscow	5	(0)
2013	→ Torpedo Moscow (loan)	10	(0)
2013–2016	Spartak-2 Moscow	82	(44)
2016–2018	Kuban Krasnodar	60	(10)
2018–2019	Mordovia Saransk	22	(8)
2019	→ Tambov (loan)	13	(5)
2019	Sochi	3	(0)
2019–2020	Tambov	26	(7)
2020–2021	Rostov	10	(0)
2021–2024	Orenburg	36	(11)

International career
2010	Russia U-18	5	(1)
2010–2011	Russia U-19	5	(1)
2012–2014	Russia U-21	16	(8)
- * Club domestic league appearances and goals

Vladimir Borisovich Obukhov (Russian: Владимир Борисович Обухов; born 8 February 1992) is a Russian former professional football player.

== Club career ==
Obukhov made his Russian Premier League debut for Spartak Moscow on 15 April 2012 in a game against Rubin Kazan.

On 4 July 2019, Obukhov signed a 2-year contract with Russian Premier League club Sochi. On 2 September 2019, Obukhov's Sochi contract was terminated by mutual consent. Obukhov returned to Tambov on the same day, signing a 2-year contract.

=== Rostov ===
On 1 October 2020, Obukhov signed for Rostov.

On 15 March 2021, it was reported that FIFA opened an investigation into Obukhov on suspicion of violating anti-doping rules in 2013. On 18 July 2021, he was banned from playing until the end of 2021.

Rostov terminated Obukhov's contract with the club on 9 August 2021.

=== Orenburg ===
On 9 December 2021, he signed with Orenburg. On 28 June 2022, Orenburg announced that Court of Arbitration for Sport ruled in favor of World Anti-Doping Agency on their appeal in Obukhov's case, and as a consequence, Obukhov received an additional six-months ban from playing. The club said Obukhov will return to the team upon serving the new ban. Obukhov left Orenburg on 5 June 2024 as his contract expired.

== Career statistics ==
As of 25 May 2024

Club	Season	League			Cup		Continental		Other		Total	
Club	Season	Division	Apps	Goals	Apps	Goals	Apps	Goals	Apps	Goals	Apps	Goals
Spartak Moscow	2011–12	Russian Premier League	3	0	0	0	0	0	–		3	0
Spartak Moscow	2012–13	Russian Premier League	1	0	0	0	0	0	–		1	0
Spartak Moscow	2013–14	Russian Premier League	1	0	0	0	0	0	–		1	0
Spartak Moscow	Total		5	0	0	0	0	0	0	0	5	0
Torpedo Moscow (loan)	2012–13	Russian First League	10	0	–		–		–		10	0
Spartak-2 Moscow	2013–14	Russian Second League	21	13	–		–		–		21	13
Spartak-2 Moscow	2014–15	Russian Second League	27	20	–		–		–		27	20
Spartak-2 Moscow	2015–16	Russian First League	34	11	–		–		3 (Note: Appearances in the FNL Cup)	2	37	13
Spartak-2 Moscow	Total		82	44	0	0	0	0	3	2	85	46
Kuban Krasnodar	2016–17	Russian First League	29	4	0	0	–		5	0	34	4
Kuban Krasnodar	2017–18	Russian First League	31	6	1	0	–		–		32	6
Kuban Krasnodar	Total		60	10	1	0	0	0	5	0	66	10
Mordovia Saransk	2018–19	Russian First League	22	8	1	0	–		–		23	8
Tambov (loan)	2018–19	Russian First League	13	5	–		–		5	3	18	8
Sochi	2019–20	Russian Premier League	3	0	–		–		–		3	0
Tambov	2019–20	Russian Premier League	17	7	0	0	–		3	1	20	8
Tambov	2020–21	Russian Premier League	9	0	1	0	–		–		10	0
Tambov	Total		26	7	1	0	0	0	3	1	30	8
Rostov	2020–21	Russian Premier League	10	0	1	0	–		–		11	0
Orenburg	2021–22	Russian First League	10	6	0	0	–		2 (Note: Appearances in the promotion play-offs)	0	12	6
Orenburg	2022–23	Russian Premier League	11	2	0	0	–		–		11	2
Orenburg	2023–24	Russian Premier League	15	3	7	2	–		–		22	5
Orenburg	Total		36	11	7	2	0	0	2	0	45	13
Career total			267	85	11	2	0	0	18	6	296	93
