= Konstantin Podkorytov =

Russian footballer

Personal information
- Full name: Konstantin Aleksandrovich Podkorytov
- Date of birth: 8 February 1986 (age 40)
- Place of birth: Neryungri, Yakutia, Russian SFSR
- Height: 1.80 m (5 ft 11 in)
- Positions: Midfielder; striker

Senior career*
Years	Team	Apps	(Gls)
2003–2005	FC Krasnodar-2000	58	(8)
2006	FC Kuban Krasnodar	1	(0)
2007	FC Krasnodar-2000	10	(5)
2007	FC Kuban Krasnodar	0	(0)
2008	FC Gubkin	16	(5)
2009	FC Mordovia Saransk	27	(5)
2010–2011	FC Gornyak Uchaly	45	(9)
2012	FC Tekstilshchik Ivanovo	26	(14)
2013	FC Ufa	7	(0)
2014–2015	FC Tekstilshchik Ivanovo	28	(6)
2015–2016	FC Torpedo Moscow	19	(3)
2016	FC SKA Rostov-on-Don	5	(0)
- * Club domestic league appearances and goals

Konstantin Aleksandrovich Podkorytov (Russian: Константин Александрович Подкорытов; born 8 February 1986) is a former Russian professional football player.

== Club career ==
He played 3 seasons in the Russian Football National League for FC Kuban Krasnodar and FC Ufa.
