= Yevgeni Ragulkin =

Russian footballer

Personal information
- Full name: Yevgeni Sergeyevich Ragulkin
- Date of birth: 25 November 1999 (age 26)
- Place of birth: Livny, Russia
- Height: 1.79 m (5 ft 10 1/2 in)
- Position: Forward

Team information
- Current team: Volna Nizhny Novgorod Oblast
- Number: 11

Youth career
- –2015: SDYuSShOR Rusichi Oryol
- 2015–2018: SShOR-1 Akademiya Futbola Tambov

Senior career*
Years	Team	Apps	(Gls)
2018–2020	Tambov	12	(1)
2019	→ Tyumen (loan)	15	(2)
2022–2023	Mashuk-KMV Pyatigorsk	22	(0)
2024	Oryol	16	(4)
2025	Druzhba Maykop	32	(6)
2026–	Volna Nizhny Novgorod Oblast	20	(7)
- * Club domestic league appearances and goals as of 31 October 2026

Yevgeni Sergeyevich Ragulkin (Russian: Евгений Сергеевич Рагулькин; born 25 November 1999) is a Russian football player who plays for Volna Nizhny Novgorod Oblast.

== Club career ==
He made his debut in the Russian Football National League for Tambov on 19 September 2018 in a game against Tom Tomsk.
