= Maksim Sergeyev =

Russian footballer

Personal information
- Full name: Maksim Mikhailovich Sergeyev
- Date of birth: 17 December 2003 (age 22)
- Place of birth: Moscow, Russia
- Height: 1.70 m (5 ft 7 in)
- Position: Midfielder

Team information
- Current team: Spartak Tambov
- Number: 31

Youth career
- 2017–2022: Torpedo Moscow

Senior career*
Years	Team	Apps	(Gls)
2022–2023	Torpedo-2	17	(0)
2023	Zenit Penza	16	(2)
2024–2025	Ural Yekaterinburg	2	(0)
2024–2026	→ Ural-2 Yekaterinburg	45	(4)
2026–	Spartak Tambov	27	(3)
- * Club domestic league appearances and goals as of 31 October 2026

Maksim Mikhailovich Sergeyev (Russian: Максим Михайлович Сергеев; born 17 December 2003) is a Russian footballer who plays as a midfielder for Russian Second League club Spartak Tambov.

== Club career ==
He made his Russian Second League debut for Torpedo-2 on 17 July 2022 in a game against Tver.

He made his debut in the Russian First League for Ural Yekaterinburg on 25 August 2025 in a game against Volga Ulyanovsk.
