= Fanen Akyam =

Nigerian footballer

Personal information
- Full name: Fanen Joseph Akyam
- Date of birth: 14 April 2000 (age 26)
- Place of birth: Kanshio, Nigeria
- Height: 1.80 m (5 ft 11 in)
- Position: Forward

Team information
- Current team: Mingəçevir
- Number: 47

Youth career
- Jim Liberty Academy

Senior career*
Years	Team	Apps	(Gls)
2019	Slutsk	10	(0)
2020	Tambov	0	(0)
2023	Belshina Bobruisk	15	(2)
2024	Qaradağ Lökbatan		
2025–	Mingəçevir		
- * Club domestic league appearances and goals as of 31 December 2023

Fanen Joseph Akyam (born 14 April 2000) is a Nigerian footballer who plays for Mingəçevir.

== Club career ==
On 21 February 2020, he joined Russian Premier League club FC Tambov.
