= Ishkhan Geloyan =

Armenian footballer

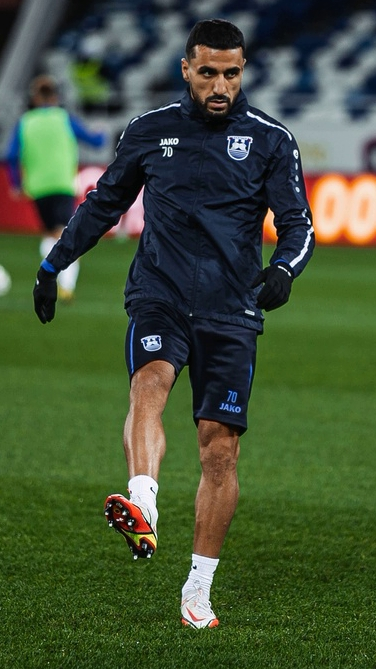

Personal information
- Full name: Ishkhan Makharovich Geloyan
- Date of birth: 31 August 1992 (age 34)
- Place of birth: Ranchpar, Armenia
- Height: 1.79 m (5 ft 10 1/2 in)
- Position: Winger

Senior career*
Years	Team	Apps	(Gls)
2012	FC Lokomotiv-2 Moscow	0	(0)
2012	FC Slavyansky Slavyansk-na-Kubani	19	(4)
2013	FC Gornyak Uchaly	12	(0)
2013–2014	FC Khimik Dzerzhinsk	32	(0)
2014	FC Baltika Kaliningrad	20	(0)
2015	FC Vityaz Krymsk	13	(5)
2015–2016	FC Baltika Kaliningrad	33	(3)
2016	FC Yenisey Krasnoyarsk	6	(0)
2017	FC Neftekhimik Nizhnekamsk	12	(0)
2017–2018	FC Luch-Energiya Vladivostok	30	(7)
2018–2019	FC Shinnik Yaroslavl	30	(7)
2019–2020	FC Tambov	0	(0)
2020–2022	FC Baltika Kaliningrad	48	(5)
2022–2023	FC SKA-Khabarovsk	26	(0)
2023–2025	FC Arsenal Tula	48	(3)
2025–2026	FC Veles Moscow	18	(0)

International career^{‡}
2021–	Armenia	5	(0)
- * Club domestic league appearances and goals as of 13 June 2026 ‡ National team caps and goals as of 11 November 2021 (UTC)

Ishkhan Makharovich Geloyan (Armenian: Իշխան Գելոյան; Russian: Ишхан Махарович Гелоян; born 31 August 1992) is an Armenian professional footballer who plays as a winger (mostly left) for the Armenia national team.

== Club career ==
He made his debut in the Russian Second Division for FC Slavyansky Slavyansk-na-Kubani on 26 July 2012 in a game against FC Mashuk-KMV Pyatigorsk.

He made his Russian Football National League debut for FC Khimik Dzerzhinsk on 13 July 2013 in a game against FC Baltika Kaliningrad.

On 15 June 2019, he signed a 2-year contract with the Russian Premier League newcomers FC Tambov. Shortly after he suffered an ACL tear which kept him out of action until March 2020. Tambov did not register him with the league for the 2020–21 Russian Premier League season.

== International career ==
Geloyan debuted with the senior Armenia national team in a 6–0 2022 FIFA World Cup qualification loss to Germany on 5 September 2021.
