= Adesoye Oyevole =

Russian footballer

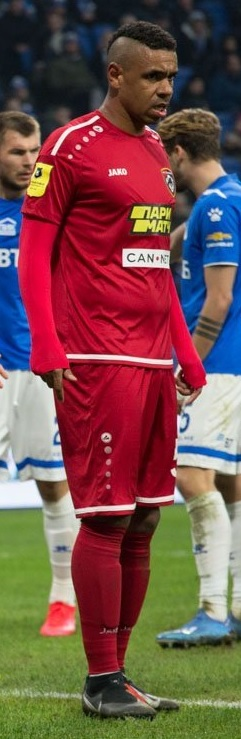
- Oyevole with FC Tambov in 2020

Personal information
- Full name: Adesoye Oyetundzhiyevich Oyevole
- Date of birth: 18 September 1982 (age 44)
- Place of birth: Moscow, Russian SFSR, Soviet Union
- Height: 1.88 m (6 ft 2 in)
- Position: Centre-back

Team information
- Current team: FC Dynamo Moscow (assistant manager)

Youth career
- Torpedo-ZIL Moscow
- Nika Moscow
- 1997–2000: Zhemchuzhina Sochi

Senior career*
Years	Team	Apps	(Gls)
2000–2002	Zhemchuzhina Sochi	18	(0)
2003–2006	FC Reutov	105	(4)
2007–2015	Ural Yekaterinburg	126	(5)
2010	→ Sibir Novosibirsk (loan)	7	(1)
2013–2015	→ Gazovik Orenburg (loan)	44	(3)
2015–2019	FC Orenburg	111	(7)
2019–2021	FC Tambov	38	(1)
2021	→ FC Orenburg (loan)	6	(0)
2021–2022	FC Orenburg	23	(0)

Managerial career
- 2022–2023: FC Orenburg (chief analyst)
- 2023–: FC Dynamo Moscow (assistant)
- * Club domestic league appearances and goals

Adesoye Oyetundzhiyevich Oyevole (Russian: Адесойе Ойетунджиевич Ойеволе; born 18 September 1982) is a Russian football coach and a former defender of Nigerian heritage. He played as a central defender. He is an assistant manager with FC Dynamo Moscow.

== Career ==
Born in Moscow to a Nigerian father and a Russian Tatar mother, Oyevole moved to Bida, Nigeria at an early age, and moved back to Russia when he was 5.

== International ==
Oyevole has played in Russian youth national teams.
