= Ranchpar =

Ranchpar Ռանչպար
- Location within Armenia Location within Ararat
- Coordinates: 40°01′31″N 44°22′13″E
- Country: Armenia
- Province: Ararat
- Municipality: Masis

Population (2011)
  - Total: 1,413
- Time zone: UTC+4
  - Summer (DST): UTC+5

Ranchpar (Armenian: Ռանչպար) is a village in the Masis Municipality of the Ararat Province of Armenia near the Armenia–Turkey border. The village consists mostly of Armenians with a Yazidi minority. Footballer and member of the Armenia national football team, Ishkhan Geloyan was born in Ranchpar.
