= Marat Sagirov =

Russian footballer

Personal information
- Full name: Marat Rashidovich Sagirov
- Date of birth: 1 April 1986 (age 40)
- Place of birth: Kazan, Russian SFSR
- Height: 1.80 m (5 ft 11 in)
- Position: Midfielder

Senior career*
Years	Team	Apps	(Gls)
2003–2004	FC Rubin Kazan	0	(0)
2005–2008	FC Rubin-2 Kazan	107	(18)
2009	FC SOYUZ-Gazprom Izhevsk	29	(3)
2010	FC Tyumen	26	(6)
2011–2012	FC KAMAZ Naberezhnye Chelny	33	(1)
2012–2013	FC Luch-Energiya Vladivostok	29	(8)
2013–2014	FC KAMAZ Naberezhnye Chelny	26	(2)
2014–2017	FC Tekstilshchik Ivanovo	82	(21)
2017	FC Neftekhimik Nizhnekamsk	11	(1)
2018	FC Lada-Togliatti	6	(1)
2018–2019	FC Luki-Energiya Velikiye Luki	20	(3)
- * Club domestic league appearances and goals

Marat Rashidovich Sagirov (Russian: Марат Рашидович Сагиров, Tatar: Марат Рәшит улы Сәгыйрев; born 1 April 1986) is a Russian former professional football player.

== Club career ==
He played in the Russian Football National League for FC KAMAZ Naberezhnye Chelny in the 2011–12 season.
