= Artyom Fedchuk =

Russian footballer (born 1994)

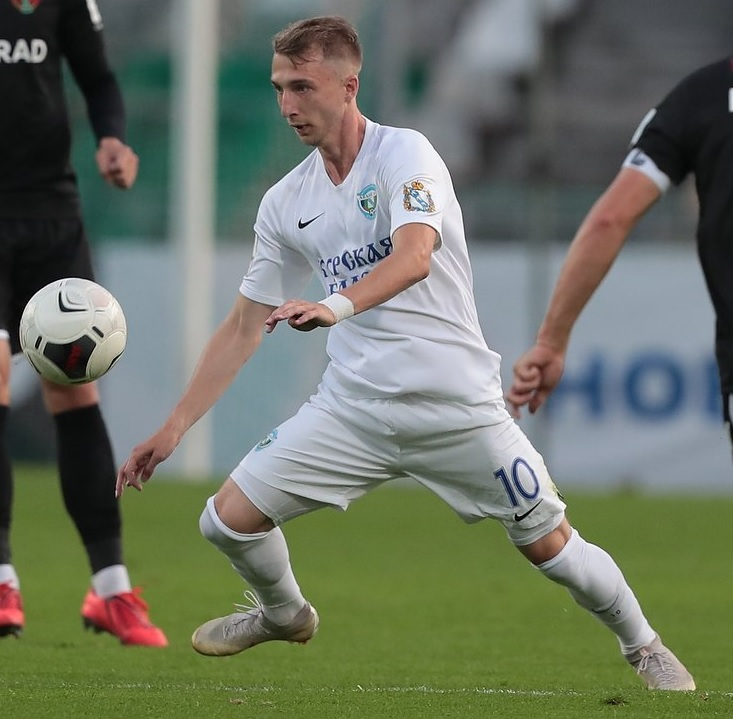
- Fedchuk with Avangard Kursk in 2019

Personal information
- Full name: Artyom Konstantinovich Fedchuk
- Date of birth: 20 December 1994 (age 31)
- Place of birth: Lipetsk, Russia
- Height: 1.75 m (5 ft 9 in)
- Position: Forward

Team information
- Current team: FC Fankom Kirov

Youth career
- –2016: FC Spartak Moscow

Senior career*
Years	Team	Apps	(Gls)
2013–2017	FC Spartak-2 Moscow	51	(11)
2017–2019	FC Avangard Kursk	71	(8)
2020–2021	FC Tambov	7	(0)
2020	→ FC Nizhny Novgorod (loan)	11	(1)
2021	→ FC Veles Moscow (loan)	15	(2)
2021	FC Chayka Peschanokopskoye	0	(0)
2021–2023	FC SKA Rostov-on-Don	38	(16)
2023	FC Kaluga	5	(1)
2025–	FC Fankom Kirov		

International career
2011	Russia U-17	6	(2)
2012	Russia U-18	2	(0)
- * Club domestic league appearances and goals as of 27 August 2023

Artyom Konstantinovich Fedchuk (Russian: Артём Константинович Федчук; born 20 December 1994) is a Russian football player who plays for a fifth-tier amateur side FC Fankom Kirov.

== Club career ==
He made his debut in the Russian Professional Football League for FC Spartak-2 Moscow on 5 October 2013 in a game against FC Kaluga. He made his Russian Football National League debut for Spartak-2 on 11 July 2015 in a game against FC Tom Tomsk.

He played in the 2017–18 Russian Cup final for FC Avangard Kursk on 9 May 2018 in the Volgograd Arena against 2–1 winners FC Tosno.

He signed with Russian Premier League club FC Tambov in December 2019. He made his Russian Premier League debut for Tambov on 7 March 2020 in a game against FC Dynamo Moscow. He substituted Mikhail Kostyukov in the 78th minute.

On 6 August 2020 he was loaned to FC Nizhny Novgorod for the 2020–21 season. On 1 February 2021, Nizhny Novgorod ended the loan early.

On 4 February 2021, he moved to FC Veles Moscow.

On 31 August 2023, Fedchuk was banned from playing for six months by the Russian Football Union. In 2021 Fedchuk signed with FC Chayka Peschanokopskoye, but the club was administratively relegated for fixing the games in an earlier season. Fedchuk cancelled the contract with Chayka and did not return the signing bonus. Chayka sued Fedchuk in the Court of Arbitration for Sport which ruled for Chayka and ordered Fedchuk to pay the club 10 million rubles. Fedchuk did not pay and was banned for that. He continued to not pay the fine and his disqualification was extended indefinitely until he pays it. In September 2025, the fifth-tier club FC Fankom Kirov he was playing for defeated a second-tier club Ufa in a Russian Cup match-up. However, as the club fielded Fedchuk, who was still banned from official RFU-sanctioned competitions, the game result was annulled and Ufa was awarded a victory after lodging their protest. The previous Fankom's opponents in the cup did not lodge any protests as they were not aware of his ban.
