= Sergei Dzodziyev =

Russian professional football player

Personal information
- Full name: Sergei Tsarayevich Dzodziyev
- Date of birth: 30 June 1980 (age 46)
- Height: 1.85 m (6 ft 1 in)
- Position: Forward

Senior career*
Years	Team	Apps	(Gls)
1999	FC Avtodor Vladikavkaz	1	(0)
2000	FC Mozdok	11	(0)
2001–2002	FC Stal-2 Alchevsk	6	(0)
2004–2005	FC Tobol Kurgan	60	(5)
2006	FC Don Novomoskovsk	19	(4)
2006–2007	FC Volga Nizhny Novgorod	32	(7)
2008–2009	FC Lada Togliatti	38	(8)
2009	FC Sokol-Saratov	14	(3)
2010	FC Volga Ulyanovsk	22	(2)
2011–2012	FC KUZBASS Kemerovo	34	(7)
2012–2014	FC Lada-Togliatti Togliatti	49	(17)
2014	FC Spartak Kostroma	6	(0)
2014–2015	FC MITOS Novocherkassk	14	(6)
2015	FC Sergiyevsk		
2015–2016	FC Syzran-2003 Syzran	26	(4)
2016–2018	FC Rubin Yalta	35	(9)
- * Club domestic league appearances and goals

Sergei Tsarayevich Dzodziyev (Russian: Серге́й Цараевич Дзодзиев; born 30 June 1980) is a Russian former professional football player.
