= Nikita Suleymanov =

Russian footballer (born 2001)

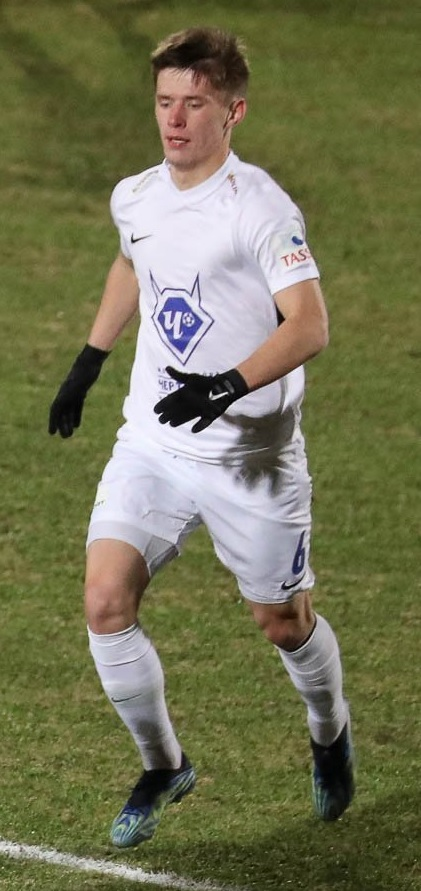
- Suleymanov with Chertanovo in 2021

Personal information
- Full name: Nikita Vladimirovich Suleymanov
- Date of birth: 17 January 2001 (age 25)
- Height: 1.79 m (5 ft 10 in)
- Position: Midfielder

Senior career*
Years	Team	Apps	(Gls)
2018–2019	FC Chertanovo-2 Moscow	16	(0)
2019–2024	FC Chertanovo Moscow	106	(2)

International career^{‡}
2016	Russia U15	5	(0)
2018–2019	Russia U18	13	(0)
2019–2020	Russia U19	2	(0)
- * Club domestic league appearances and goals as of 13 June 2024 ‡ National team caps and goals as of 11 February 2020

Nikita Vladimirovich Suleymanov (Russian: Никита Владимирович Сулейманов; born 17 January 2001) is a Russian football player.

== Club career ==
He made his debut in the Russian Professional Football League for FC Chertanovo-2 Moscow on 18 July 2018 in a game against FC Murom.

He made his Russian Football National League debut for FC Chertanovo Moscow on 3 November 2019 in a game against FC Fakel Voronezh.
