= Ilya Shurygin =

Russian footballer

Personal information
- Full name: Ilya Vitalyevich Shurygin
- Date of birth: 28 July 1998 (age 28)
- Place of birth: Moscow, Russia
- Height: 1.83 m (6 ft 0 in)
- Position: Defender

Team information
- Current team: FC Amkal Moscow

Youth career
- –2014: Timiryazevets Moscow
- 2014–2016: Sokol Moscow

Senior career*
Years	Team	Apps	(Gls)
2017	FC Znamya Noginsk (amateur)		
2017–2018	FC Dnepr Smolensk	16	(0)
2018–2019	FC Znamya Noginsk (amateur)		
2019–2020	FC Tom Tomsk	5	(0)
2020–2022	FC Znamya Noginsk	44	(1)
2022–	FC Amkal Moscow	0	(0)
- * Club domestic league appearances and goals as of 5 June 2022

Ilya Vitalyevich Shurygin (Russian: Илья Витальевич Шурыгин; born 28 July 1998) is a Russian football player. He plays for FC Amkal Moscow.

== Club career ==
He made his debut in the Russian Professional Football League for SFC CRFSO Smolensk on 19 July 2017 in a game against FC Kolomna.

He made his Russian Football National League debut for FC Tom Tomsk on 25 August 2019 in a game against FC Chertanovo Moscow.
