= Yevgeni Tsimbal =

Russian footballer

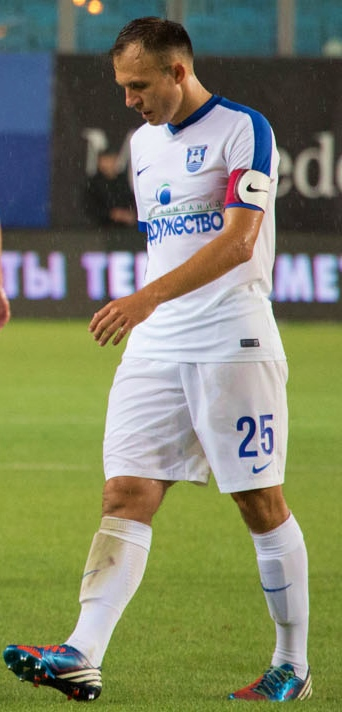

Personal information
- Full name: Yevgeni Dmitriyevich Tsimbal
- Date of birth: 11 February 1986 (age 40)
- Place of birth: Kaliningrad, Russian SFSR
- Height: 1.77 m (5 ft 10 in)
- Positions: Midfielder; defender

Senior career*
Years	Team	Apps	(Gls)
2006–2007	FC Baltika-2 Kaliningrad	62	(7)
2008	FC Baltika Kaliningrad	8	(0)
2008	FC Sheksna Cherepovets	4	(0)
2009	→ FC Dnepr Smolensk (loan)	28	(0)
2010	FC Mostovik-Primorye Ussuriysk	11	(0)
2011–2015	FC Dnepr Smolensk	129	(6)
2015–2017	FC Baltika Kaliningrad	74	(0)
2017–2018	FC Zorky Krasnogorsk	37	(3)
2019	FC Volga Ulyanovsk	16	(0)
2020	FC Kuban-Holding Pavlovskaya (amateur)		
2020–2024	FC Kuban-Holding Pavlovskaya	119	(4)
- * Club domestic league appearances and goals

Yevgeni Dmitriyevich Tsimbal (Russian: Евгений Дмитриевич Цимбал; born 11 February 1986) is a Russian former professional football player.

== Club career ==
He made his Russian Football National League debut for FC Baltika Kaliningrad on 19 April 2008 in a game against FC Metallurg-Kuzbass Novokuznetsk.
