= Maksim Lazutkin =

Russian footballer

Personal information
- Full name: Maksim Antonovich Lazutkin
- Date of birth: 25 March 1999 (age 27)
- Place of birth: Tambov, Russia
- Height: 1.74 m (5 ft 8 1/2 in)
- Position: Midfielder

Youth career
- FC Tambov

Senior career*
Years	Team	Apps	(Gls)
2017–2019	FC Tambov	1	(0)
- * Club domestic league appearances and goals

Maksim Antonovich Lazutkin (Russian: Максим Антонович Лазуткин; born 25 March 1999) is a Russian former football player.

== Club career ==
He made his debut in the Russian Football National League for FC Tambov on 6 October 2018 in a game against FC Shinnik Yaroslavl as an 86th-minute substitute for Valeriu Ciupercă.
