= Danil Klyonkin =

Russian footballer

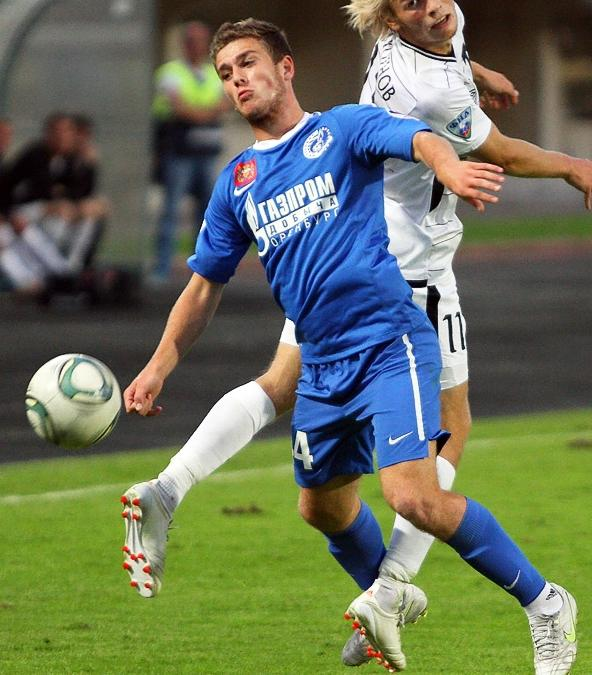
- Klyonkin with Gazovik Orenburg in 2011

Personal information
- Full name: Danil Konstantinovich Klyonkin
- Date of birth: 14 July 1990 (age 36)
- Place of birth: Vnukovo, Russian SFSR
- Height: 1.74 m (5 ft 9 in)
- Position: Midfielder

Youth career
- FShM Torpedo Moscow

Senior career*
Years	Team	Apps	(Gls)
2008	Torpedo Moscow	0	(0)
2009–2010	Torpedo-ZIL Moscow	47	(2)
2011	Istra	17	(2)
2011–2013	Gazovik Orenburg	34	(0)
2013–2017	Tyumen	125	(20)
2017–2018	Krylia Sovetov Samara	37	(2)
2018–2019	Tambov	27	(3)
2020–2021	Neftekhimik Nizhnekamsk	41	(6)
2021–2023	Baltika Kaliningrad	63	(6)
2023–2024	Volgar Astrakhan	24	(4)
2024	Tyumen	19	(0)
- * Club domestic league appearances and goals

Danil Konstantinovich Klyonkin (Russian: Данил Константинович Клёнкин; born 14 July 1990) is a Russian former professional football player who played as an attacking midfielder.

== Club career ==
He made his debut in the Russian Premier League for Tambov on 21 July 2019 in a game against Lokomotiv Moscow.

On 27 January 2020 he moved to Neftekhimik Nizhnekamsk.
