= Khasan Mamtov =

Russian footballer

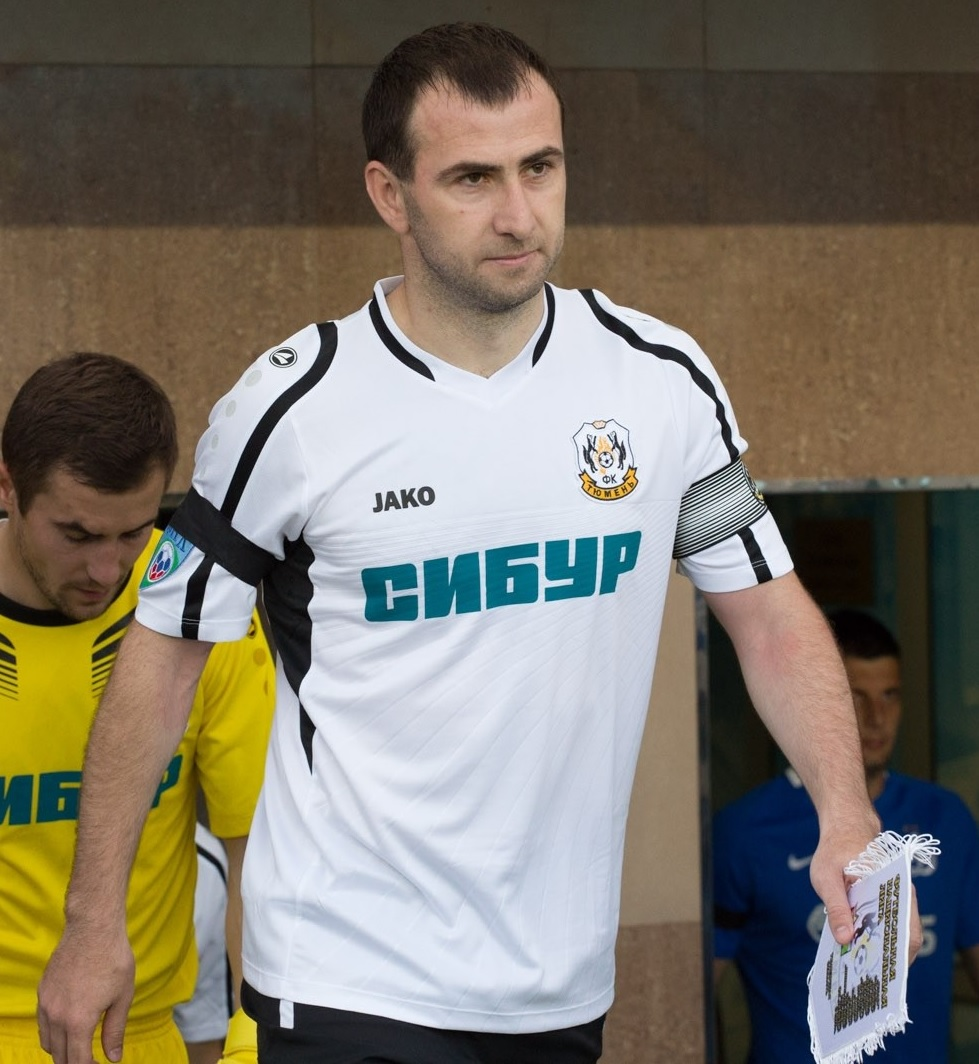
- Mamtov with Tyumen in 2016

Personal information
- Full name: Khasan Inalbekovich Mamtov
- Date of birth: 28 April 1984 (age 42)
- Place of birth: Besleney, Russian SFSR
- Height: 1.81 m (5 ft 11 in)
- Position: Forward

Senior career*
Years	Team	Apps	(Gls)
2002–2003	FC Nart Cherkessk	65	(5)
2004–2005	FC Dynamo Stavropol	23	(1)
2006	FC Chernomorets Novorossiysk	4	(0)
2006–2007	FC Dynamo Stavropol	37	(7)
2008	FC Mashuk-KMV Pyatigorsk	34	(7)
2009–2010	FC Ural Sverdlovsk Oblast	42	(2)
2011–2012	FC Khimki	44	(10)
2012	FC SKA-Energiya Khabarovsk	17	(1)
2013–2017	FC Tyumen	144	(63)
2017	FC Anzhi Makhachkala	6	(0)
2017–2018	FC Orenburg	24	(4)
2018–2020	FC Tambov	47	(7)
2020–2021	FC Kuban Krasnodar	25	(14)
2023	FC Kuban Krasnodar	2	(0)
- * Club domestic league appearances and goals

Khasan Inalbekovich Mamtov (Russian: Хасан Инальбекович Мамтов; born 28 April 1984) is a Russian former professional footballer who played as a forward.

== Club career ==
He made his professional debut in the Russian Second Division in 2002 for FC Nart Cherkessk.

He made his Russian Premier League debut for FC Anzhi Makhachkala on 15 July 2017 in a game against PFC CSKA Moscow, at the age of 33 and after 15 seasons on lower levels.
