= Anton Kilin =

Russian footballer

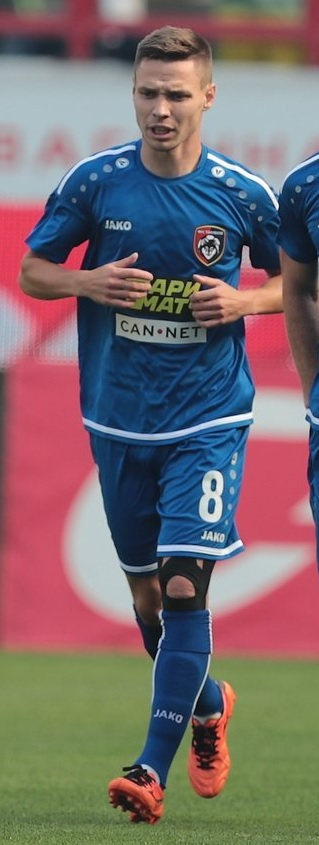
- Kilin with FC Tambov in 2019

Personal information
- Full name: Anton Vladimirovich Kilin
- Date of birth: 14 November 1990 (age 35)
- Place of birth: Izhevsk, Russian SFSR
- Height: 1.69 m (5 ft 6 1/2 in)
- Position: Winger

Team information
- Current team: FC KDV Tomsk
- Number: 18

Senior career*
Years	Team	Apps	(Gls)
2007	FC Krylia Sovetov-SOK Dimitrovgrad	2	(0)
2008–2009	FC Togliatti	57	(7)
2010	FC Akademiya Togliatti	22	(2)
2011–2013	FC Chelyabinsk	59	(12)
2013–2016	FC Ufa	29	(4)
2015–2016	→ FC KAMAZ Naberezhnye Chelny (loan)	18	(2)
2016–2017	FC Luch-Energiya Vladivostok	56	(3)
2018–2020	FC Tambov	84	(4)
2021–2024	FC Akron Tolyatti	102	(9)
2024–2025	FC Urartu	15	(1)
2025–	FC KDV Tomsk	51	(3)
- * Club domestic league appearances and goals as of 1 November 2026

Anton Vladimirovich Kilin (Russian: Антон Владимирович Килин; born 14 November 1990) is a Russian professional football player who plays as a winger (left or right) for FC KDV Tomsk.

== Club career ==
He made his Russian Premier League debut for FC Ufa on 20 September 2014 in a game against FC Ural Yekaterinburg.
