= FC Spartak Tambov =

- Full name: Football Club Spartak Tambov
- Founded: 1960
- Ground: Spartak
- Capacity: 4,990
- Manager: Mikhail Pilipko
- League: Russian Second League, Division A, Silver Group
- 2026: Division B, Group 3, 1st (promoted)
- Website: fcspartak68.ru
Home colours	Away colours

FC Spartak Tambov (Russian: ФК «Спартак» Тамбов) is a Russian association football club from Tambov, firstly founded in 1960. It most often played in the Russian Second League. It played on the second-highest level of the Soviet First League from 1960 to 1962. In 1972-1979 the team was called Revtrud Tambov. In 2014 it was dissolved due to bankruptcy. Tambov was represented professionally by FC Tambov until its dissolution in 2021. In July 2022, Spartak was reestablished by the Governor of Tambov Oblast. The club was licensed for the third-tier Russian Second League for the 2022–23 season.

The club's most famous alumni are Yuri Zhirkov and Dmitri Sychev.

== Current squad ==
As of 13 September 2026, according to the Second League website.

Note: Flags indicate national team as defined under FIFA eligibility rules; some limited exceptions apply. Players may hold more than one non-FIFA nationality.

No.	Pos.	Nation	Player
1	GK	RUS	Aleksandr Bazhenov
3	DF	RUS	Pavel Khodeyev
4	DF	RUS	Marat Bogdayev
5	DF	RUS	Murad Omarov
7	MF	RUS	Kirill Zhitlov
8	MF	RUS	Vladislav Konyrev
9	FW	RUS	Artyom Arkhipov
10	MF	RUS	Andrey Maloletov
11	MF	RUS	Maksim Sergeyev
15	FW	RUS	Andrei Chasovskikh
17	MF	RUS	Yegor Glukhov
18	MF	RUS	Daniil Gurchenko
21	MF	RUS	Ayrat Khabibulin

No.	Pos.	Nation	Player
22	DF	RUS	Vyacheslav Puzikov
29	DF	RUS	Vyacheslav Frolov
31	DF	RUS	Artyom Mironov
49	DF	RUS	Aleksandr Mironov
55	DF	RUS	Ilya Krylov
71	GK	RUS	Andrey Bondar
72	GK	RUS	Ilya Tikhomirov
78	DF	RUS	Ivan Bzikadze
80	FW	RUS	Dmitry Kuptsov
81	DF	RUS	Mikhail Osinov
88	MF	RUS	Ivan Stavtsev
98	MF	RUS	Roman Petrov
