= FC Gubkin =

- Full name: Football Club Gubkin
- Founded: 1995
- Dissolved: 2013
- Ground: Gornyak Stadium
- Capacity: 6,004
- Chairman: Anatoly Kretov
- League: Russian Second Division, Zone Center
- 2012–13: 12th
| Home colours | Away colours |

FC Gubkin (Russian: ФК Губкин) is a Russian association football club from Gubkin, founded in 1995. It first played on the professional league level in 2006 in the Russian Second Division, where it played until 2013, when it was dissolved. Until 2003 the team was called FC Lebedinets Gubkin.
