= FC Tambov =

- Full name: FK Tambov
- Nickname: The Wolves
- Founded: 2013
- Dissolved: 2021
- Ground: Mordovia Arena
- Capacity: 44,442
- 2020–21: Russian Premier League, 16th (relegated)
- Website: http://fc-tambov.ru
Home colours	Away colours	Third colours

FC Tambov (Russian: ФК Тамбов) was a Russian football team from Tambov. It last played in the Russian Premier League, having won promotion to the top division of Russian football in 2019, before dissolving in 2021.

== History ==
FC Tambov started out on the professional level in the third-tier Russian Professional Football League in the 2013–14 season. Despite coming in last in their zone in their first professional season, the team was not relegated, as a team that came ahead of them in the table dropped out for financial reasons.

For the 2016–17 season, they were promoted to the Russian Football National League for the first time. On the last day of the 2016–17 season, they needed to defeat FC SKA-Khabarovsk away to achieve 4th place and a spot in the promotion play-offs for the Russian Premier League, but the game ended with a score of 2–2, leaving Tambov in 5th place. At the end of the next 2017–18 season they secured 4th place and a chance to play in the promotion play-offs. They lost both legs of the play-offs to FC Amkar Perm and remained in the FNL.

On 11 May 2019, the club secured a top-two finish in the 2018–19 Russian National Football League and subsequently promotion to the Russian Premier League for the 2019–20 season, for the first time in the club's history. For Premier League football purposes, they played their "home" games at the Mordovia Arena in Saransk, 184 miles away. The local ground did not pass the Premier League standards and the planned renovation was not finished by the deadline.

During the winter break of the 2020–21 season, Tambov experienced extreme financial difficulties, which led to most of the squad leaving as free agents, with only 3 players remaining from the autumn part of the season. Russian Premier League advanced the season fees for the TV rights to the club so that it would be able to finish the season and not drop out. The squad was filled out with free agents and prospects which the other RPL teams loaned for the rest of the season. On 27 March 2021, it was reported that Tambov did not apply for the Russian Premier League or Russian Football National League license for the 2021–22 season, but can still apply for the third-tier PFL license. On 2 May 2021, they lost their 9th game in a row (which was also their 17th winless game in a row) and officially secured the last place in the RPL and relegation. They finished the season with a streak of 11 losses and 19 winless matches. On 19 May 2021, club's general director Olga Konovalova announced that all the contracts for coaching and backroom staff and all the players have been terminated and the club will undergo bankruptcy and be dissolved.

=== League and cup ===
Season	League									Russian Cup	Top goalscorer		Managers
Season	Div.	Pos.	Pl.	W	D	L	GS	GA	P	Russian Cup	Name	League	Managers
2013–14	3rd	12th	30	8	7	15	38	44	31	First round	(Russia) Mikhail Tynyany	11	(Russia) Sergei Pervushin (Russia) Sergei Perednya
2014–15	3rd	3rd	30	19	8	3	71	26	65	Third round	(Russia) Roman Grigoryan	9	(Russia) Sergei Perednya
2015–16	3rd	1st	26	15	9	2	41	19	54	Round of 32	(Russia) Roman Grigoryan	8	(Russia) Valery Yesipov
2016–17	2nd	5th	38	15	12	11	42	34	57	Round of 32	(Ukraine) Serhiy Shevchuk	7	(Russia) Andrei Talalayev
2017–18	2nd	4th	38	20	8	10	57	36	68	Round of 16	(Russia) Andrei Chasovskikh	10	(Russia) Andrei Talalayev
2018–19	2nd	1st	38	21	10	7	55	35	73	Round of 32	(Russia) Vladimir Obukhov	12	(Russia) Timur Shipshev
2019–20	1st	14th	30	9	4	17	37	41	31	Round of 32	(Russia) Vladimir Obukhov (Russia) Georgi Melkadze (Russia) Mikhail Kostyukov	7	(Russia) Aleksandr Grigoryan (Russia) Sergei Pervushin (Caretaker)
2020–21	1st	16th	30	3	4	23	19	65	13	Round of 16	(Russia) German Onugkha	4	(Russia) Sergei Pervushin

== Honours ==
- Russian Football National League
  - Champions: 2018–19
- Russian Professional Football League
  - Center Group Champions: 2015–16
