= 2019–20 FC Anzhi Makhachkala season =

Anzhi Makhachkala
2019–20 season
- Manager: Valeri Barmin (until 28 October); Artur Sadirov (Caretaker) (from 28 October)
- Stadium: Anzhi Sports Complex (week 2, 6, 8, 10); Anzhi-Arena (week 4, 12); Sultan Bilimkhanov Stadium (week 17)
- Professional Football League: 15th
- Russian Cup: Second Round (vs. Alania Vladikavkaz)
- Top goalscorer: League: Magomed Magomedov; Muslim Shikhbabayev (6 each); All: Magomed Magomedov; Muslim Shikhbabayev (6 each)
Home colours	Away colours	Third colours

The 2019–20 FC Anzhi Makhachkala season was the club's first season back in the Russian Professional Football League, the third tier of football in Russia, since 1996. Anzhi finished the previous season bottom of the Russian Premier League and where initially relegated to the Russian National Football League for the 2019–20 season. However, on 15 May 2019, the club failed to earn a Russian Football Union license for the 2019–20 season, recalled their appeal against the decision on 29 May 2019, dropping down to the Russian Professional Football League.

== Season events ==
On 3 June, Magomed Adiyev left the club after his contract had expired.

On 26 June, Anzhi confirmed that they had received a license to play in the Russian Professional Football League for the 2019–20 season, and that they were still unable to register new players due to outstanding debts.

On 28 September, Anzhi were docked six-points due to debt owed to former player Yannick Boli.

On 28 October, Valeri Barmin was dismissed as manager of Anzhi, with Artur Sadirov being appointed as Caretaker Manager the same day.

On 1 April, the Russian Football Union extended the suspension of football until 31 May.

On 15 May, the Russian Football Union announced that the Russian Professional Football League season had ended as of the result on 17 March 2020, due to COVID-19 pandemic.

== Squad ==
As of match played 15 March 2020

No.	Name	Nationality	Position	Date of birth (age)	Signed from	Signed in	Contract ends	Apps.	Goals
Goalkeepers
1	Timur Magomedov	(Russia)	GK	20 December 2001 (age 24)	Youth Team	2019		10	0
54	Adam Shikhanmatov	(Russia)	GK	14 February 2003 (age 23)	Youth Team	2019		0	0
Defenders
2	Magomednabi Yagyayev	(Russia)	DF	13 August 1999 (age 27)	Youth Team	2017		18	1
3	Mukhtar Khanmurzayev	(Russia)	DF	23 November 2000 (age 25)	Youth Team	2017		17	1
4	Rustam Machilov	(Russia)	DF	23 February 2000 (age 26)	Youth Team	2016		15	0
5	Alikadi Saidov	(Russia)	DF	2 April 1999 (age 27)	Youth Team	2017		15	1
15	Radzhab Gusengadzhiyev	(Russia)	DF	7 October 2001 (age 25)	Youth Team	2019		15	0
16	Dzhamaludin Ipayev	(Russia)	DF	16 December 2002 (age 23)	Youth Team	2019		5	0
21	Shamil Abdurazakov	(Russia)	DF	25 January 2001 (age 25)	Youth Team	2017		12	0
22	Said Shikhaliyev	(Russia)	DF	22 May 2001 (age 25)	Youth Team	2019		1	0
43	Yusup Vagabov	(Russia)	DF	29 October 2000 (age 26)	Youth Team	2018		3	1
77	Umar Magomedbekov	(Russia)	DF	21 January 2001 (age 25)	Youth Team	2019		5	0
Midfielders
6	Magomednur Isayev	(Russia)	MF	29 March 2000 (age 26)	Youth Team	2018		8	0
8	Mutaalim Magomedov	(Russia)	MF	21 April 2000 (age 26)	Youth Team	2018		18	0
9	Razhab Magomedov	(Russia)	MF	3 October 2000 (age 26)	Youth Team	2018		15	1
10	Chingiz Agabalayev	(Russia)	MF	29 January 1997 (age 29)	Legion Dynamo Makhachkala	2018		18	1
13	Dzhambulat Abdulkadyrov	(Russia)	MF	3 November 1998 (age 28)	Orbita Krasnogvardeyskoye	2018		17	1
14	Sultan Isalov	(Russia)	MF	26 April 2000 (age 26)	Youth Team	2018		11	0
17	Magomed Magomedov	(Russia)	MF	22 July 1997 (age 29)	Legion Dynamo Makhachkala	2019		16	6
37	Islam Khalimbekov	(Russia)	MF	29 April 2000 (age 26)	Youth Team	2018		6	0
44	Ramazan Kerimov	(Russia)	MF	3 January 1999 (age 27)	Youth Team	2017		6	0
88	Shakhban Gaydarov	(Russia)	MF	21 January 1997 (age 29)	Legion Dynamo Makhachkala	2019		18	0
93	Shikhamir Isayev	(Russia)	MF	10 December 2000 (age 25)	Youth Team	2018		11	0
Forwards
19	Salautdin Batyrbekov	(Russia)	FW	15 September 2001 (age 25)	Youth Team	2019		7	0
70	Muslim Shikhbabayev	(Russia)	FW	21 July 1999 (age 27)	Legion Dynamo Makhachkala	2019		14	6
79	Arsanbeg Murtazaliev	(Russia)	FW	19 October 2000 (age 26)	Youth Team	2019		0	0
Out on loan
99	Maksim Bogatyryov	(Russia)	GK	23 February 1999 (age 27)	Lokomotiv Moscow	2017		10	0
Players who left during the season
7	Gamid Agalarov	(Russia)	FW	16 July 2000 (age 26)	Youth Team	2017		22	5
17	Abu-Said Eldarushev	(Russia)	MF	17 October 2001 (age 25)	Youth Team	2019		3	0
18	Aliaskhab Dubukhov	(Russia)	MF	18 January 2001 (age 25)	Youth Team	2019		2	0
57	Makhach Abdulkhamidov	(Russia)	FW	10 April 2002 (age 24)	Youth Team	2019		1	0

=== Out on loan ===
Note: Flags indicate national team as defined under FIFA eligibility rules; some limited exceptions apply. Players may hold more than one non-FIFA nationality.

No. / Pos. / Nation / Player; 99 / GK / RUS / Maksim Bogatyryov (at Avangard Kursk)	No. / Pos. / Nation / Player

== Transfers ==
=== In ===
Date	Position	Nationality	Name	From	Fee	Ref.
Summer 2019	MF	(Russia)	Shakhban Gaydarov	Legion Dynamo Makhachkala		
Summer 2019	MF	(Russia)	Magomed Magomedov	Legion Dynamo Makhachkala		
Summer 2019	FW	(Russia)	Muslim Shikhbabayev	Legion Dynamo Makhachkala		

=== Out ===
Date	Position	Nationality	Name	To	Fee	Ref.
Summer 2019	MF	(Russia)	Aliaskhab Dubukhov	Legion Dynamo Makhachkala		
Summer 2019	MF	(Russia)	Abu-Said Eldarushev	Legion Dynamo Makhachkala		
Summer 2019	FW	(Russia)	Makhach Abdulkhamidov	Legion Dynamo Makhachkala		
24 January 2020	FW	(Russia)	Gamid Agalarov	Ufa	Undisclosed	

=== Loans out ===
Date from	Position	Nationality	Name	To	Date to	Ref.
21 February 2020	GK	(Russia)	Maksim Bogatyryov	Avangard Kursk	End of season	

=== Released ===
Date	Position	Nationality	Name	Joined	Date
Summer 2019	GK	(Russia)	Aleksandr Budakov		
Summer 2019	GK	(Russia)	Yury Dyupin	Rubin Kazan	13 June 2019
Summer 2019	DF	(Russia)	Igor Udaly	Rotor Volgograd	
Summer 2019	DF	(Russia)	Anton Belov	Pyunik	16 June 2019
Summer 2019	DF	(Russia)	Dmitry Belorukov		
Summer 2019	DF	(Russia)	Magomed Elmurzayev	SKA-Khabarovsk	25 June 2019
Summer 2019	DF	(Russia)	Pavel Kaloshin	Akhmat Grozny	5 July 2019
Summer 2019	DF	(Russia)	Yevgeny Gapon	Khimki	
Summer 2019	DF	(Russia)	Nikita Chistyakov	Ural Yekaterinburg	21 June 2019
Summer 2019	MF	(Russia)	Vladislav Kulik	Tambov	
Summer 2019	MF	(Russia)	Shakhban Gaydarov	Legion Dynamo Makhachkala	
Summer 2019	MF	(Russia)	Adlan Katsayev	SKA-Khabarovsk	
Summer 2019	MF	(Russia)	Nikita Andreyev	Van	
Summer 2019	MF	(Cameroon)	Gaël Ondoua	Servette	2 July 2019
Summer 2019	MF	(Russia)	Magomed Magomedov	Legion Dynamo Makhachkala	
Summer 2019	MF	(Russia)	Kamil Zakirov	Rubin Kazan	13 June 2019
Summer 2019	FW	(Russia)	Ivan Markelov	Tambov	9 July 2019
Summer 2019	FW	(Argentina)	Juan Lescano	Yenisey Krasnoyarsk	20 September 2019
Summer 2019	FW	(Venezuela)	Andrés Ponce	Akhmat Grozny	4 June 2019
Summer 2019	FW	(Georgia (country))	Nikoloz Kutateladze	Spartak Moscow	
Summer 2019	FW	(Russia)	Ivan Ivanchenko	Armavir	
Summer 2019	FW	(Russia)	Pavel Dolgov	Yenisey Krasnoyarsk	
Summer 2019	FW	(Russia)	Amur Kalmykov	Armavir	10 June 2019

== Friendlies ==
4 February 2020	Anzhi Makhachkala	2 – 1	RSDYUSh	Makhachkala
MSK (UTC+3)	56'; Mu.Magomedov	Report	Goal

== Competitions ==
=== Professional Football League ===
==== Results by round ====
Round	1	2	3	4	5	6	7	8	9	10	11	12	13	14	15	16	17	18	19
Ground	A	H	A	H	A	H	A	H	A	H	A	H	A	A	A	H	A	A	H
Result	D	D	L	D	L	D	D	W	L	W	L	D	L	L	L	L	L	D	W
Position	6	10	12	12	14	14	14	11	14	15	15	15	15	15	15	15	16	16	15

Updated to match(es) played on 15 March 2020. Source: See Results
A = Away; H = Home; W = Win; D = Draw; L = Loss

==== Results ====
16 July 2019 1	Spartak Nalchik	1 – 1	Anzhi Makhachkala	Nalchik
17:30 MSK (UTC+3)	Dokhov (yellow card) 33'; Batsev (yellow card) 66' (goal) 90+1' (pen.); Kadykoyev (yellow card) 69'	Report	Agalarov (yellow card) 33'; Abdulkadyrov 51'; Yagyayev (yellow card) 70'; S.Isayev (yellow card) 85'; M.Isayev (yellow card) 85'; Bogatyryov (yellow card) 86'; Khanmurzayev (yellow card) 90+1'	Stadium: Spartak Stadium; Attendance: 400; Referee: Vitaliy Ermakov

25 July 2019 2	Anzhi Makhachkala	1 – 1	Inter Cherkessk	Kaspiysk
17:00 MSK (UTC+3)	Saidov (yellow card) 33' (yellow-red card) 45'; Vagabov 80'; Khanmurzayev (yellow card) 90+1'	Report	Gagity (yellow card) 43'; Stolbovoy (yellow card) 45+1'; Kuchiyev 53'; Kishev (yellow card) 81'; Da.Daliyev (yellow card) 90+1'	Stadium: Anzhi Sports Complex; Attendance: 650; Referee: Yunus Koshko
Note: Match played at the Anzhi Sports Complex in Kaspiysk instead of Anzhi's regular Anzhi Arena in Kaspiysk.

1 August 2019 3	Alania Vladikavkaz	2 – 1	Anzhi Makhachkala	Vladikavkaz
17:00 MSK (UTC+3)	Butayev (red card) 19'; Mashukov 65'; Khabalov (yellow card) 90+1'; Khadartsev 90+2' (pen.)	Report	Agalarov 21' (yellow card) 39'; T.Magomedov (yellow card) 29'; Yagyayev (yellow card) 64'; M.Isayev (yellow card) 74'; Khanmurzayev (yellow card) 90+1'	Stadium: Republican Spartak Stadium; Attendance: 8,500; Referee: Vitaly Doroshenko

10 August 2019 4	Anzhi Makhachkala	2 – 2	Spartak Vladikavkaz	Kaspiysk
16:30 MSK (UTC+3)	Agalarov 22'; Agabalayev (yellow card) 53'; Khanmurzayev 83' (yellow card) 87'	Report	Gatikoyev 16', 19' (yellow card) 70'; Alborov (yellow card) 48'	Stadium: Anzhi Arena; Attendance: 500; Referee: Vitality Ermakov

16 August 2019 5	Chernomorets Novorossiysk	2 – 1	Anzhi Makhachkala	Novorossiysk
18:00 MSK (UTC+3)	Dibirgadzhiyev 57', 84'; Patsev (yellow card) 76'	Report	Agalarov (yellow card) 5'; Mu.Magomedov (yellow card) 37'; Machilov (yellow card) 58'; Bogatyryov (yellow card) 63'; Agabalayev 90+1' (pen.)	Stadium: Central Stadium; Attendance: 1,200; Referee: Oleg Sokolov

25 August 2019 6	Anzhi Makhachkala	2 – 2	Druzhba Maykop	Kaspiysk
16:00 MSK (UTC+3)	Agabalayev (yellow card) 28'; Agalarov (yellow card) 40' (goal) 51' (pen.), 90+1'; Khanmurzayev (yellow card) 61'; Mu.Magomedov (yellow card) 86'; Gusengadzhiyev (yellow card) 90+1'	Report	Delok 16'; Gigolayev (yellow card) 50'; Kadimov (yellow card) 58'; Belov (yellow card) 73'; Konov 90+2'	Stadium: Anzhi Sports Complex; Attendance: 800; Referee: Sergey Smirnov
Note: Match played at the Anzhi Sports Complex in Kaspiysk instead of Anzhi's regular Anzhi Arena in Kaspiysk.

1 September 2019 7	Krasnodar-3	2 – 2	Anzhi Makhachkala	Krasnodar
17:00 MSK (UTC+3)	Apekov 2'; Samartsiyev (yellow card) 35'; Samko (yellow card) 59'	Report	Yagyayev 11' (yellow card) 49'; R.Magomedov 23'	Stadium: Krasnodar Academy Stadium; Attendance: 350; Referee: Pavel Shishkin

8 September 2019 8	Anzhi Makhachkala	6 – 1	Urozhay Krasnodar	Kaspiysk
16:00 MSK (UTC+3)	Ma.Magomedov 10', 63', 79'; Abdulkadyrov (yellow card) 18'; Gaydarov (yellow card) 18'; Saidov (yellow card) 23'; Shikhbabayev 41', 45'; Agalarov 86'	Report	Tarakanov (yellow card) 10'; Aleksandr Nesterenko (yellow card) 65'; Timur Melekestsev 90+1'	Stadium: Anzhi Sports Complex; Attendance: 500; Referee: Lasha Verulidze
Note: Match played at the Anzhi Sports Complex in Kaspiysk instead of Anzhi's regular Anzhi Arena in Kaspiysk.

14 September 2019 9	Volgar Astrakhan	2 – 0	Anzhi Makhachkala	Astrakhan
16:30 MSK (UTC+3)	Abdulkadyrov 45' (o.g.); Stepanov (yellow card) 49'; Lesnikov 66' (yellow card) 78'; Manukovsky (yellow card) 83'	Report	Khanmurzayev (yellow card) 78'	Stadium: Central Stadium; Attendance: 2,000; Referee: Aleksey Ivannikov

21 September 2019 10	Anzhi Makhachkala	1 – 0	Biolog-Novokubansk	Kaspiysk
15:00 MSK (UTC+3)	Ma.Magomedov 9'; Machilov (yellow card) 41'; Abdulkadyrov (yellow card) 64' (yellow-red card) 73'; Yagyayev (yellow card) 77'; Gaydarov (yellow card) 90'	Report	Sedykh (yellow card) 34' (yellow-red card) 48'; Kargin (yellow card) 76'	Stadium: Anzhi Sports Complex; Attendance: 100; Referee: Aleksey Koltunov
Note: Match played at the Anzhi Sports Complex in Kaspiysk instead of Anzhi's regular Anzhi Arena in Kaspiysk.

28 September 2019 11	Mashuk-KMV Pyatigorsk	4 – 0	Anzhi Makhachkala	Pyatigorsk
16:00 MSK (UTC+3)	Kolesnikov (yellow card) 10'; Demidov 21'; Lezgintsev (yellow card) 28'; Krendelev 37'; Dzhatiyev 54'; Verkashansky (yellow card) 81'; Karibov 90+2'	Report	Saidov (yellow card) 23'; Mu.Magomedov (yellow card) 28'; Machilov (yellow card) 55'; Khanmurzayev (yellow card) 83'; Gusengadzhiyev (yellow card) 84'; Agalarov (yellow card) 90+1'	Stadium: Central Stadium; Attendance: 420; Referee: Andrey Zubov

6 October 2019 12	Anzhi Makhachkala	1 – 1	SKA Rostov-on-Don	Kaspiysk
13:00 MSK (UTC+3)	Ma.Magomedov (yellow card) 13'; Shikhbabayev 53' (yellow card) 89'	Report	Grebenyukov (yellow card) 18'; Bogatyryov 51'	Stadium: Anzhi Arena; Attendance: 300; Referee: Igor Kholin

12 October 2019 13	Makhachkala	1 – 0	Anzhi Makhachkala	Kaspiysk
14:30 MSK (UTC+3)	R.Isayev (yellow card) 6'; Korgoloyev (yellow card) 41'; Temukov (yellow card) 67'; Gazimagomedov 70'; Averkiyev (yellow card) 90'	Report	R.Magomedov (yellow card) 2'; Saidov (yellow card) 62'	Stadium: Anzhi Sports Complex; Attendance: 250; Referee: Pavel Shadykhanov

18 October 2019 28	Legion Dynamo Makhachkala	2 – 0	Anzhi Makhachkala	Makhachkala
14:30 MSK (UTC+3)	Bogatyryov (yellow card) 59'; Magomedov 72', 74'	Report	Khanmurzayev (yellow card) 84'	Stadium: Dynamo Stadium; Attendance: 400; Referee: Anatoly Zhabchenko

27 October 2019 29	Dynamo Stavropol	2 – 0	Anzhi Makhachkala	Stavropol
14:00 MSK (UTC+3)	Yatsuk (yellow card) 52' (goal) 79'; Az.Kurachinov (penalty missed) 89' 89'	Report	Agalarov (yellow card) 17'; Gusengadzhiyev (yellow card) 86'	Stadium: Dynamo Stadium; Attendance: 500; Referee: Yaroslav Khromey

3 November 2019 16	Inter Cherkessk	v	Anzhi Makhachkala	Cherkessk
14:00 MSK (UTC+3)
Note: Match postponed due to adverse weather conditions.

9 November 2019 17	Anzhi Makhachkala	1 – 2	Alania Vladikavkaz	Grozny
14:00 MSK (UTC+3)	Ma.Magomedov 12'; Gaydarov (yellow card) 87'; Saidov (yellow card) 90'; Yagyayev (yellow card) 90+3'	Report	Mashukov 6'; Butayev (yellow card) 42'; Burayev (red card) 70'; Gurtsiyev 76'	Stadium: Sultan Bilimkhanov Stadium; Attendance: 200; Referee: Maksim Vasilchenko
Note: Match played at the Sultan Bilimkhanov Stadium in Grozny instead of Anzhi's regular Anzhi Arena in Kaspiysk.

17 November 2019 18	Spartak Vladikavkaz	1 – 0	Anzhi Makhachkala	Vladikavkaz
14:00 MSK (UTC+3)	Gatikoyev 43'; Georgi Bazayev (yellow card) 57'; D.Berezov (yellow card) 76'	Report	Yagyayev (yellow card) 55'; Agabalayev (yellow card) 63'; Gaydarov (yellow card) 68'	Stadium: Republican Spartak Stadium; Attendance: 200; Referee: Aleksey Ivannikov

10 March 2020 16	Inter Cherkessk	2 – 2	Anzhi Makhachkala	Lermontov
14:00 MSK (UTC+3)	De.Daliyev 7', 50'; Gagity (yellow card) 30'; Kuchiyev (yellow card) 45'; Zabrodin (yellow card) 53'; S.Mitrenko (yellow card) 89'	Report	M.Yagyayev (yellow card) 35'; Ma.Magomedov 70'; R.Machilov (yellow card) 72'; M.Khanmurzayev (yellow card) 75'; C.Agabalayev (yellow card) 84'; M.Shikhbabayev 90'	Stadium: Beshtau Stadium; Attendance: 100; Referee: Lasha Verulidze
Note: Match originally scheduled for 3 November 2019 but postponed due to adverse weather conditions.

15 March 2020 19	Anzhi Makhachkala	3 – 2	Chernomorets Novorossiysk	Makhachkala
14:00 MSK (UTC+3)	Saidov 26'; M.Khanmurzayev (yellow card) 35'; M.Shikhbabayev (yellow card) 49' (goal) 78', 89'; Gaydarov (yellow card) 87'	Report	Grechkin 79'; A.Akhmedzhanov 86'; A.Zaytsev (yellow card) 90+3'	Stadium: Sokol Stadium; Attendance: 500; Referee: Aleksey Ivannikov

21 March 2020 20	Druzhba Maykop	–	Anzhi Makhachkala	Maykop
MSK (UTC+3)				Stadium: Stadium Yunost
Note: Match cancelled on 15 April due to the COVID-19 pandemic.

28 March 2020 21	Anzhi Makhachkala	–	Krasnodar-3	Makhachkala
MSK (UTC+3)				Stadium: Sokol Stadium
Note: Match cancelled on 15 April due to the COVID-19 pandemic.

28 March 2020 22	Urozhay Krasnodar	–	Anzhi Makhachkala	Krasnodar
MSK (UTC+3)				Stadium: Kuban Stadium
Note: Match cancelled on 15 April due to the COVID-19 pandemic.

12 April 2020 23	Anzhi Makhachkala	–	Volgar Astrakhan	Makhachkala
MSK (UTC+3)				Stadium: Sokol Stadium
Note: Match cancelled on 15 April due to the COVID-19 pandemic.

18 April 2020 24	Biolog-Novokubansk	–	Anzhi Makhachkala	Progress
MSK (UTC+3)				Stadium: Progress Stadium
Note: Match cancelled on 15 April due to the COVID-19 pandemic.

26 April 2020 25	Anzhi Makhachkala	–	Mashuk-KMV Pyatigorsk	Makhachkala
MSK (UTC+3)				Stadium: Sokol Stadium
Note: Match cancelled on 15 April due to the COVID-19 pandemic.

4 May 2020 26	SKA Rostov-on-Don	–	Anzhi Makhachkala	Rostov-on-Don
MSK (UTC+3)				Stadium: SKA SKVO Stadium
Note: Match cancelled on 15 April due to the COVID-19 pandemic.

10 May 2020 27	Anzhi Makhachkala	–	Makhachkala	Makhachkala
MSK (UTC+3)				Stadium: Sokol Stadium
Note: Match cancelled on 15 April due to the COVID-19 pandemic.

17 May 2020 14	Anzhi Makhachkala	–	Legion Dynamo Makhachkala	Makhachkala
MSK (UTC+3)				Stadium: Sokol Stadium
Note: Match cancelled on 15 April due to the COVID-19 pandemic.

24 May 2020 15	Anzhi Makhachkala	–	Dynamo Stavropol	Makhachkala
MSK (UTC+3)				Stadium: Sokol Stadium
Note: Match cancelled on 15 April due to the COVID-19 pandemic.

29 May 2020 30	Anzhi Makhachkala	–	Spartak Nalchik	Makhachkala
MSK (UTC+3)				Stadium: Sokol Stadium
Note: Match cancelled on 15 April due to the COVID-19 pandemic.

=== Russian Cup ===
28 July 2019 Second Round	Alania Vladikavkaz	1 – 0	Anzhi Makhachkala	Vladikavkaz
17:00 MSK (UTC+3)	Gurtsiyev 81'	Report	Saidov (yellow card) 48'; Ipayev (yellow card) 83'; Gusengadzhiyev (yellow card) 90+1'	Stadium: Republican Spartak Stadium; Attendance: 7,500; Referee: Maksim Vasilchenko

== Squad statistics ==
As of match played 15 March 2020

=== Appearances and goals ===
No.	Pos	Nat	Player	Total		Professional Football League		Russian Cup	
No.	Pos	Nat	Player	Apps	Goals	Apps	Goals	Apps	Goals
1	GK	(Russia) RUS	Timur Magomedov	10	0	9	0	1	0
2	DF	(Russia) RUS	Magomednabi Yagyayev	18	1	18	1	0	0
3	DF	(Russia) RUS	Mukhtar Khanmurzayev	17	1	17	1	0	0
4	DF	(Russia) RUS	Rustam Machilov	15	0	12+2	0	1	0
5	DF	(Russia) RUS	Alikadi Saidov	14	1	13	1	1	0
6	MF	(Russia) RUS	Magomednur Isayev	8	0	4+4	0	0	0
8	MF	(Russia) RUS	Mutaalim Magomedov	18	0	17+1	0	0	0
9	MF	(Russia) RUS	Razhab Magomedov	15	1	14+1	1	0	0
10	MF	(Russia) RUS	Chingiz Agabalayev	17	1	9+7	1	1	0
13	MF	(Russia) RUS	Dzhambulat Abdulkadyrov	17	1	13+4	1	0	0
14	MF	(Russia) RUS	Sultan Isalov	12	0	7+4	0	1	0
15	DF	(Russia) RUS	Radzhab Gusengadzhiyev	15	0	5+9	0	1	0
16	DF	(Russia) RUS	Dzhamaludin Ipayev	5	0	3+1	0	0+1	0
17	MF	(Russia) RUS	Magomed Magomedov	14	6	11+3	6	0	0
19	FW	(Russia) RUS	Salautdin Batyrbekov	7	0	0+6	0	1	0
21	DF	(Russia) RUS	Shamil Abdurazakov	12	0	2+9	0	1	0
22	DF	(Russia) RUS	Said Shikhaliyev	1	0	0	0	0+1	0
37	MF	(Russia) RUS	Islam Khalimbekov	6	0	0+5	0	0+1	0
43	DF	(Russia) RUS	Yusup Vagabov	3	1	3	1	0	0
44	MF	(Russia) RUS	Ramazan Kerimov	6	0	5+1	0	0	0
70	FW	(Russia) RUS	Muslim Shikhbabayev	14	6	10+4	6	0	0
77	DF	(Russia) RUS	Umar Magomedbekov	5	0	2+2	0	1	0
88	MF	(Russia) RUS	Shakhban Gaydarov	11	0	11	0	0	0
93	MF	(Russia) RUS	Shikhamir Isayev	10	0	0+10	0	0	0
Players away from the club on loan:
99	GK	(Russia) RUS	Maksim Bogatyryov	10	0	10	0	0	0
Players who left Anzhi Makhachkala during the season:
7	FW	(Russia) RUS	Gamid Agalarov	15	5	14+1	5	0	0
17	MF	(Russia) RUS	Abu-Said Eldarushev	3	0	0+2	0	1	0
18	MF	(Russia) RUS	Aliaskhab Dubukhov	2	0	0+1	0	1	0
57	FW	(Russia) RUS	Makhach Abdulkhamidov	1	0	0	0	0+1	0

=== Goal scorers ===
Place	Position	Nation	Number	Name	Professional Football League	Russian Cup	Total
1	MF	(Russia)	17	Magomed Magomedov	6	0	6
1	FW	(Russia)	70	Muslim Shikhbabayev	6	0	6
3	FW	(Russia)	7	Gamid Agalarov	5	0	5
4	MF	(Russia)	13	Dzhambulat Abdulkadyrov	1	0	1
4	DF	(Russia)	43	Yusup Vagabov	1	0	1
4	DF	(Russia)	3	Mukhtar Khanmurzayev	1	0	1
4	MF	(Russia)	10	Chingiz Agabalayev	1	0	1
4	DF	(Russia)	2	Magomednabi Yagyayev	1	0	1
4	MF	(Russia)	9	Razhab Magomedov	1	0	1
4	DF	(Russia)	5	Alikadi Saidov	1	0	1
				TOTALS	24	0	24

=== Clean sheets ===
Place	Position	Nation	Number	Name	Professional Football League	Russian Cup	Total
1	GK	(Russia)	99	Maksim Bogatyryov	1	0	1
				TOTALS	1	0	1

=== Disciplinary record ===
Number	Nation	Position	Name	Professional Football League		Russian Cup		Total	
Number	Nation	Position	Name	Yellow card	Red card	Yellow card	Red card	Yellow card	Red card
1	(Russia)	GK	Timur Magomedov	1	0	0	0	1	0
2	(Russia)	DF	Magomednabi Yagyayev	7	0	0	0	7	0
3	(Russia)	DF	Mukhtar Khanmurzayev	10	0	0	0	10	0
4	(Russia)	DF	Rustam Machilov	4	0	0	0	4	0
5	(Russia)	DF	Alikadi Saidov	6	1	1	0	7	1
6	(Russia)	MF	Magomednur Isayev	2	0	0	0	2	0
8	(Russia)	MF	Mutaalim Magomedov	3	0	0	0	3	0
9	(Russia)	MF	Razhab Magomedov	1	0	0	0	1	0
10	(Russia)	MF	Chingiz Agabalayev	4	0	0	0	4	0
13	(Russia)	MF	Dzhambulat Abdulkadyrov	3	1	0	0	3	1
15	(Russia)	DF	Radzhab Gusengadzhiyev	3	0	1	0	4	0
16	(Russia)	DF	Dzhamaludin Ipayev	0	0	1	0	1	0
17	(Russia)	MF	Magomed Magomedov	1	0	0	0	1	0
70	(Russia)	FW	Muslim Shikhbabayev	2	0	0	0	2	0
88	(Russia)	MF	Shakhban Gaydarov	5	0	0	0	5	0
93	(Russia)	MF	Shikhamir Isayev	1	0	0	0	1	0
Players away on loan:
99	(Russia)	GK	Maksim Bogatyryov	2	0	0	0	2	0
Players who left Anzhi Makhachkala during the season:
7	(Russia)	FW	Gamid Agalarov	6	0	0	0	6	0
			TOTALS	61	2	3	0	64	2
