= 2020–21 FC Anzhi Makhachkala season =

Anzhi Makhachkala
2019–20 season
- Manager: Artur Sadirov
- Stadium: RDYUSSH MinObrNauki RD - Polytech
- PFL: 6th
- Russian Cup: Round of 128 vs Legion Dynamo Makhachkala
- Top goalscorer: League: Magomed Magomedov (12); All: Magomed Magomedov (12)
Home colours	Away colours	Third colours

The 2020–21 FC Anzhi Makhachkala season was the club's second season in the Russian Professional Football League, the third tier of football in Russia, since 1996.

== Season events ==
On 29 June, Anzhi Makhachkala were granted a licence to compete in the Russian Professional Football League for the 2020–21 season.

On 18 September, Vice President Shamil Asildarov signed a playing-contract with the club for the remainder of the season.

On 28 December, Ahmed Ismailov signed a new three-year contract with Anzhi Makhachkala.

Umar Magomedbekov, Radzhab Gusengadzhiyev, Shamil Abdurazakov and Adam Shikhanmatov all signed new 2.5-year contracts with Anzhi Makhachkala.

On 3 January, Ahmed Ismailov signed a new three-year contract with Anzhi Makhachkala. On 13 January, Alikadi Saidov signed a new two-year contract with Anzhi Makhachkala.

== Squad ==
As of match played 2 June 2021

No.	Name	Nationality	Position	Date of birth (age)	Signed from	Signed in	Contract ends	Apps.	Goals
Goalkeepers
1	Timur Magomedov	(Russia)	GK	20 December 2001 (age 24)	Youth Team	2019		42	0
54	Adam Shikhanmatov	(Russia)	GK	14 February 2003 (age 23)	Youth Team	2019	2023	3	0
Defenders
2	Magomednabi Yagyayev	(Russia)	DF	13 August 1999 (age 26)	Youth Team	2017		47	12
3	Dzhamaludin Ipayev	(Russia)	DF	16 December 2002 (age 23)	Youth Team	2019		24	0
4	Rustam Machilov	(Russia)	DF	23 February 2000 (age 26)	Youth Team	2016		42	3
5	Alikadi Saidov	(Russia)	DF	2 April 1999 (age 27)	Youth Team	2017	2022	45	2
13	Dzhambulat Abdulkadyrov	(Russia)	DF	3 November 1998 (age 27)	Orbita Krasnogvardeyskoye	2018		40	2
15	Radzhab Gusengadzhiyev	(Russia)	DF	7 October 2001 (age 24)	Youth Team	2019	2023	36	0
20	Marat Ramazanov	(Russia)	DF	23 October 2002 (age 23)	Youth Team	2021		1	0
21	Shamil Abdurazakov	(Russia)	DF	25 January 2001 (age 25)	Youth Team	2017	2023	29	1
43	Yusup Vagabov	(Russia)	DF	29 October 2000 (age 25)	Youth Team	2018		4	1
77	Umar Magomedbekov	(Russia)	DF	21 January 2001 (age 25)	Youth Team	2019	2023	25	0
	Mukhtar Khanmurzayev	(Russia)	DF	23 November 2000 (age 25)	Youth Team	2017		32	3
Midfielders
6	Magomednur Isayev	(Russia)	MF	29 March 2000 (age 26)	Youth Team	2018		27	0
7	Magomed Magomedov	(Russia)	MF	22 July 1997 (age 29)	Legion Dynamo Makhachkala	2019		47	18
8	Mutaalim Magomedov	(Russia)	MF	21 April 2000 (age 26)	Youth Team	2018		50	1
9	Razhab Magomedov	(Russia)	MF	3 October 2000 (age 25)	Youth Team	2018		29	4
10	Chingiz Agabalayev	(Russia)	MF	29 January 1997 (age 29)	Legion Dynamo Makhachkala	2018		48	5
14	Sultan Isalov	(Russia)	MF	26 April 2000 (age 26)	Youth Team	2018		42	4
25	Oscar Isakov	(Russia)	MF	21 May 2002 (age 24)	Youth Team	2020		2	0
37	Islam Khalimbekov	(Russia)	MF	29 April 2000 (age 26)	Youth Team	2018		21	0
41	Ahmed Ismailov	(Russia)	MF	1 January 2002 (age 24)	Youth Team	2020	2023	18	1
44	Ramazan Kerimov	(Russia)	MF	3 January 1999 (age 27)	Youth Team	2017		6	0
51	Abdurakhman Abdulaev	(Russia)	MF	30 August 2002 (age 23)	Youth Team	2021		2	0
88	Shakhban Gaydarov	(Russia)	MF	21 January 1997 (age 29)	Legion Dynamo Makhachkala	2019		44	0
93	Shikhamir Isayev	(Russia)	MF	10 December 2000 (age 25)	Youth Team	2018		32	0
Forwards
17	Ruslan Kalaev	(Russia)	FW	17 February 1998 (age 28)	Youth Team	2020		9	1
19	Salautdin Batyrbekov	(Russia)	FW	15 September 2001 (age 24)	Youth Team	2019		8	0
22	Yusuf Aliev	(Russia)	FW	5 February 2000 (age 26)	Youth Team	2019		1	0
33	Shamil Asildarov	(Russia)	FW	18 May 1983 (age 43)		2020			
70	Muslim Shikhbabayev	(Russia)	FW	21 July 1999 (age 27)	Legion Dynamo Makhachkala	2019		41	17
79	Arsanbeg Murtazaliev	(Russia)	FW	19 October 2000 (age 25)	Youth Team	2019		2	0
Out on loan
Players who left during the season

=== Out on loan ===
Note: Flags indicate national team as defined under FIFA eligibility rules; some limited exceptions apply. Players may hold more than one non-FIFA nationality.

No. / Pos. / Nation / Player	No. / Pos. / Nation / Player

== Transfers ==
=== In ===
Date	Position	Nationality	Name	From	Fee	Ref.
18 September 2020	FW	(Russia)	Shamil Asildarov	Unattached	Free	

=== Out ===
Date	Position	Nationality	Name	To	Fee	Ref.
17 July 2020	GK	(Russia)	Maksim Bogatyryov	Avangard Kursk	Undisclosed	

== Friendlies ==
3 December 2020	Legion Dynamo Makhachkala	0 – 1	Anzhi Makhachkala	Makhachkala
14:00 MSK (UTC+3)		Report

10 February 2021	Mashuk-KMV Pyatigorsk	0 – 1	Anzhi Makhachkala	Pyatigorsk
15:00 MSK (UTC+3)		Report	R.Machilov	Stadium: Central Stadium

18 February 2021	Anzhi Makhachkala	1 – 1	Dynamo Bryansk	Pyatigorsk
MSK (UTC+3)	Ma.Magomedov	Report	Goal	Stadium: Central Stadium

18 February 2021	Anzhi Makhachkala	0 – 0	Yessentuki	Pyatigorsk
MSK (UTC+3)		Report		Stadium: Central Stadium

20 February 2021	Anzhi Makhachkala	3 – 0	Inter Cherkessk	Pyatigorsk
MSK (UTC+3)	S.Batyrbekov; R.Gusengadzhiyev	Report	Penalty missed	Stadium: Central Stadium

21 February 2021	Anzhi Makhachkala	1 – 1	Biolog-Novokubansk	Pyatigorsk
MSK (UTC+3)	Ma.Magomedov	Report	Goal	Stadium: Central Stadium

== Competitions ==
=== Professional Football League ===
==== Results summary ====
Overall								Home						Away					
Pld	W	D	L	GF	GA	GD	Pts	W	D	L	GF	GA	GD	W	D	L	GF	GA	GD
32	14	9	9	59	43	+16	51	8	5	3	30	17	+13	6	4	6	29	26	+3

Last updated: 15 June 2021.
Source: See Results

==== Results by round ====
Round	1	2	3	4	5	6	7	8	9	10	11	12	13	14	15	16	17	18	19	20	21	22	23	24	25	26	27	28	29	30	31	32	33	34
Ground	A	H	A	H	A	H	A	H	A	-	H	A	H	A	H	A	H	A	H	A	H	A	H	A	H	-	A	H	A	H	A	H	A	H
Result	W	W	L	D	W	W	D	D	D	-	W	L	L	W	W	D	D	W	L	D	L	W	W	L	D	-	L	D	L	W	W	W	L	W

Updated to match(es) played on 15 June 2021. Source: See Results
A = Away; H = Home; W = Win; D = Draw; L = Loss

==== Results ====
9 August 2020 1	Druzhba Maykop	1 – 4	Anzhi Makhachkala	Maykop
17:00 MSK (UTC+3)	O.Yeshchenko (yellow card) 4'; Karakoz (yellow card) 26'; S.Babenko 43'; T.Dukhu (yellow card) 55'; R.Khagur (yellow card) 78'; A.Konov (yellow card) 81'; T.Khuako (yellow card) 89'; Belov (yellow card) 89'	Report	M.Yagyayev 42'; Mu.Magomedov (yellow card) 43'; Ma.Magomedov 45', 88', 90+4'; S.Isayev (yellow card) 60'; S.Isalov (yellow card) 90+'	Stadium: Yunost Stadium; Attendance: 0 Referee: Vitaly Doroshenko
Note: Match played behind closed doors due to the COVID-19 pandemic.

15 August 2020 2	Anzhi Makhachkala	1 – 0	SKA Rostov	Makhachkala
16:30 MSK (UTC+3)	M.Khanmurzayev (yellow card) 28'; D.Ipayev (yellow card) 33'; Ma.Magomedov (yellow card) 45+2'; R.Machilov (yellow card) 49'; M.Yagyayev 78' (pen.)	Report	I.Kostylev (yellow card) 54'; I.Skripnik (yellow card) 78'	Stadium: RDYUSSH MinObrNauki RD - Polytech; Attendance: 0 Referee: Oleg Koretsky
Note: Match played behind closed doors due to the COVID-19 pandemic.

22 August 2020 3	Legion Dynamo Makhachkala	4 – 1	Anzhi Makhachkala	Makhachkala
16:00 MSK (UTC+3)	S.Saaduyev 5'; Kadiyev 49'; R.Shikhayev 78'; S.Shalbuzov (yellow card) 79'; Gasanov (yellow card) 88'; A.Eldarushev 90'	Report	D.Ipayev (yellow card) 38'; Ma.Magomedov 51' (yellow card) 55'; C.Agabalayev (yellow card) 75'; Gaydarov (red card) 84'	Stadium: Dynamo Stadium; Attendance: 0 Referee: Alexey Koltunov
Note: Match played behind closed doors due to the COVID-19 pandemic.

28 August 2020 4	Anzhi Makhachkala	1 – 1	Krasnodar-3	Makhachkala
16:00 MSK (UTC+3)	Ma.Magomedov (yellow card) 12'; M.Yagyayev (yellow card) 20' (goal) 84'; D.Ipayev (yellow card) 90'	Report	R.Simonov 50'; M.Strelnik (yellow card) 83'	Stadium: RDYUSSH MinObrNauki RD - Polytech; Attendance: 0 Referee: Vladimir Shamara
Note: Match played behind closed doors due to the COVID-19 pandemic.

6 September 2020 5	Kuban-Holding	1 – 2	Anzhi Makhachkala	Krasnodar
18:00 MSK (UTC+3)	S.Lysenko (yellow card) 26'; S.Mikhaylov (yellow card) 51'; Sinyavsky 55' (yellow card) 81'; D.Belobayev (yellow card) 67' (yellow-red card) 78'; Doguzov (yellow card) 73'	Report	M.Khanmurzayev 24' (yellow card) 34'; Ma.Magomedov 27'; D.Ipayev (yellow card) 90'	Stadium: Kuban Stadium; Attendance: 110; Referee: Sergey Smirnov

12 September 2020 6	Anzhi Makhachkala	3 – 0	Yessentuki	Makhachkala
15:30 MSK (UTC+3)	M.Yagyayev 47'; U.Magomedbekov (yellow card) 49'; Ma.Magomedov 85'; S.Isalov 90+'	Report	D.Ivanov (yellow card) 35'; Solomatin (yellow card) 48'; G.Burkov (yellow card) 71'	Stadium: RDYUSSH MinObrNauki RD - Polytech; Attendance: 0 Referee: Vitaly Doroshenko
Note: Match played behind closed doors due to the COVID-19 pandemic.

19 September 2020 7	Biolog-Novokubansk	1 – 1	Anzhi Makhachkala	Novokubansk
14:00 MSK (UTC+3)	K.Davydov (yellow card) 19'; M.Krivorog (yellow card) 31'; A.Borisov (yellow card) 64'; Khodunov 69'	Report	U.Magomedbekov (yellow card) 14'; Gaydarov 53'; M.Shikhbabayev (yellow card) 76'	Stadium: Biolog Stadium; Attendance: 200; Referee: Maxim Vasilchenko

25 September 2020 8	Anzhi Makhachkala	2 – 2	Chernomorets Novorossiysk	Makhachkala
15:00 MSK (UTC+3)	D.Ipayev (yellow card) 32' (yellow-red card) 54'; C.Agabalayev (yellow card) 58'; N.Grishin 78' (o.g.); M.Yagyayev 86'	Report	Mustafin (yellow card) 32'; I.Timoshenko 57'; N.Grishin (yellow card) 60'; Y.Budagyan (yellow card) 66' (yellow-red card) 77'; M.Omarov 88'	Stadium: RDYUSSH MinObrNauki RD - Polytech; Attendance: 0 Referee: Pavel Smirnov
Note: Match played behind closed doors due to the COVID-19 pandemic.

4 October 2020 9	Spartak Nalchik	1 – 1	Anzhi Makhachkala	Nalchik
16:00 MSK (UTC+3)	A.Baksanokov 16'; K.Kadykoyev (yellow card) 23'; A.Olmezov (red card) 49'; Makoyev (yellow card) 67'; I.Dokhov (yellow card) 72'; Z.Shumakhov (yellow card) 90+'	Report	Gaydarov (yellow card) 76'; M.Khanmurzayev 90+'	Stadium: Spartak Stadium; Attendance: 0 Referee: Vitaly Ermakov
Note: Match played behind closed doors due to the COVID-19 pandemic.

10	Bye
MSK (UTC+3)

17 October 2020 11	Anzhi Makhachkala	2 – 1	Dynamo Stavropol	Makhachkala
14:30 MSK (UTC+3)	M.Khanmurzayev (yellow card) 10'; M.Shikhbabayev (yellow card) 26' (goal) 84'; Ma.Magomedov 37'; S.Isalov (yellow card) 51'; D.Ipayev (yellow card) 78'	Report	Ionov (yellow card) 44'; Kurazhov (yellow card) 47'; M.Borisov (yellow card) 50'; Bolshunov 55'; V.Tsarukyan (yellow card) 79'	Stadium: RDYUSSH MinObrNauki RD - Polytech; Attendance: 0
Note: Match played behind closed doors due to the COVID-19 pandemic.

25 October 2020 12	Makhachkala	1 – 0	Anzhi Makhachkala	Kaspiysk
14:00 MSK (UTC+3)	I.Yakhyayev (yellow card) 66'; Y.Makhmudov (yellow card) 81'; M.Saidov (yellow card) 90'; K.Girayev 90' (pen.)	Report	C.Agabalayev (yellow card) 34'; D.Ipayev (yellow card) 49'; S.Isayev (yellow card) 90'	Stadium: Anzhi Arena Training Pitch; Attendance: 0 Referee: Alexey Koltunov
Note: Match played behind closed doors due to the COVID-19 pandemic.

31 October 2020 13	Anzhi Makhachkala	1 – 2	Kuban Krasnodar	Makhachkala
14:00 MSK (UTC+3)	M.Shikhbabayev 34'; Gaydarov (yellow card) 57'; M.Yagyayev (yellow card) 71' (yellow-red card) 84'; D.Ipayev (yellow card) 77'	Report	N.Abdokov 9' (yellow card) 42'; I.Gruznov 61'; Chabanov (yellow card) 84'	Stadium: RDYUSSH MinObrNauki RD - Polytech; Attendance: 0 Referee: Alexey Ivannikov
Note: Match played behind closed doors due to the COVID-19 pandemic.

6 November 2020 14	Inter Cherkessk	0 – 4	Anzhi Makhachkala	Cherkessk
14:00 MSK (UTC+3)	Gagity (yellow card) 64'; D.Daliyev (yellow card) 67'; Kishev (yellow card) 79'	Report	Ma.Magomedov 3'; Kishev 46' (o.g.); M.Shikhbabayev (yellow card) 51'; A.Ismailov 81'; R.Machilov 88'	Attendance: 0 Referee: Vitaly Doroshenko
Note: Match played behind closed doors due to the COVID-19 pandemic.

13 November 2020 15	Anzhi Makhachkala	1 – 0	Tuapse	Makhachkala
13:30 MSK (UTC+3)	D.Ipayev (yellow card) 66'; R.Machilov 81'	Report	N.Trifonov (yellow card) 77'	Stadium: RDYUSSH MinObrNauki RD - Polytech; Attendance: 0 Referee: Anton Frolov
Note: Match played behind closed doors due to the COVID-19 pandemic.

21 November 2020 16	Mashuk-KMV Pyatigorsk	1 – 1	Anzhi Makhachkala	Pyatigorsk
15:00 MSK (UTC+3)	D.Rodin (yellow card) 13'; D.Dulaev (yellow card) 29'; Z.Tsakoyev 38'; A.Ashinov (yellow card) 55' (yellow-red card) 90+'; Lebedev (yellow card) 89'	Report	C.Agabalayev (yellow card) 27'; M.Khanmurzayev (yellow card) 36'; Ma.Magomedov (yellow card) 56'; Gaydarov (yellow card) 62'; M.Isayev (yellow card) 68'; D.Abdulkadyrov (yellow card) 80'; Asildarov (yellow card) 85'; M.Yagyayev 90+' (pen.)	Stadium: Central Stadium; Attendance: 0 Referee: Igor Nizovtsev
Note: Match played behind closed doors due to the COVID-19 pandemic.

5 March 2021 17	Anzhi Makhachkala	1 – 1	Forte Taganrog	Makhachkala
14:00 MSK (UTC+3)	Gaydarov (yellow card) 29'; R.Gusengadzhiyev (yellow card) 37'; Zakirov 45' (o.g.); M.Yagyayev (yellow card) 53'; R.Machilov (yellow card) 84'	Report	Cherkes (yellow card) 29' (yellow-red card) 35'; Morgunov (yellow card) 33'; P.Zenzura 77'; Maloyan (yellow card) 90'	Stadium: RDYUSSH MinObrNauki RD - Polytech; Referee: Igor Kholin
Note: Match played behind closed doors due to the COVID-19 pandemic.

14 March 2021 18	SKA Rostov	0 – 1	Anzhi Makhachkala	Rostov-on-Don
16:00 MSK (UTC+3)	Donskov (yellow card) 76'	Report	M.Shikhbabayev 19'; Ma.Magomedov (yellow card) 45'; M.Isayev (yellow card) 90+'	Stadium: SKA SKVO Stadium; Attendance: 725; Referee: Yaroslav Khromey

20 March 2021 19	Anzhi Makhachkala	0 – 2	Legion Dynamo Makhachkala	Makhachkala
14:00 MSK (UTC+3)	M.Yagyayev (yellow card) 3'	Report	B.Gamzatov 7' (yellow card) 33'; T-A.Malsagov (yellow card) 19'; A-S.Eldarushev 90+'	Stadium: RDYUSSH MinObrNauki RD - Polytech; Attendance: 450; Referee: Vladimir Shamara

25 March 2021 20	Krasnodar-3	1 – 1	Anzhi Makhachkala	Krasnodar
14:00 MSK (UTC+3)	Bochko (yellow card) 36'; Rzayev 90'	Report	M.Yagyayev (yellow card) 22'; M.Shikhbabayev (yellow card) 30' (goal) 35'; R.Gusengadzhiyev (yellow card) 41'; D.Ipayev (yellow card) 71'; S.Abdurazakov (yellow card) 74'; A.Ismailov (yellow card) 88'	Stadium: Krasnodar Academy Stadium; Attendance: 0 Referee: Viktor Latsviev
Note: Match played behind closed doors due to the COVID-19 pandemic.

30 March 2021 21	Anzhi Makhachkala	0 – 1	Kuban-Holding	Makhachkala
13:00 MSK (UTC+3)	Saidov (yellow card) 14'; Ma.Magomedov (yellow card) 22'; Gaydarov (yellow card) 35' (yellow-red card) 37'; T.Magomedov (yellow card) 90+'	Report	Dyshekov (yellow card) 12'; Gigolayev (yellow card) 30'; Piliyev (yellow card) 39'; N.Gigolayev 68'	Stadium: RDYUSSH MinObrNauki RD - Polytech; Attendance: 250; Referee: Alexander Mashlyakevich

4 April 2021 22	Yessentuki	0 – 3	Anzhi Makhachkala	Yessentuki
13:00 MSK (UTC+3)	G.Magomedov (yellow card) 60'	Report	Saidov (yellow card) 29'; Ma.Magomedov 39', 70'; R.Gusengadzhiyev (yellow card) 60'; R.Magomedov 76'	Stadium: Essentuki Arena; Attendance: 250; Referee: Yunus Koshko

9 April 2021 23	Anzhi Makhachkala	3 – 2	Biolog-Novokubansk	Makhachkala
15:00 MSK (UTC+3)	Mu.Magomedov 5'; M.Yagyayev 51' (pen.) (yellow card) 53' (yellow-red card) 67'; I.Khalimbekov (yellow card) 72' (yellow-red card) 80'; Ma.Magomedov (yellow card) 80'; D.Abdulkadyrov (yellow card) 87'; R.Machilov 90+'	Report	Lesnikov 21'; Dzhamalutdinov (yellow card) 31' (yellow-red card) 50'; I.Salakhetdinov (yellow card) 68'; N.Kargin 75'; R.Khibaba (yellow card) 85'; A.Borisov (yellow card) 90+'; Tsiberkin (yellow card) 90+'	Stadium: RDYUSSH MinObrNauki RD - Polytech; Attendance: 250; Referee: Inal Tanashev

15 April 2021 24	Chernomorets Novorossiysk	4 – 1	Anzhi Makhachkala	Novorossiysk
18:00 MSK (UTC+3)	Antonov 6'; I.Matyushenko 13'; R.Akhmedkhanov (yellow card) 40' (goal) 56', 76'; V.Garayev (yellow card) 44'; I.Kurbanov (yellow card) 61'; V.Averkiyev (yellow card) 68'	Report	C.Agabalayev (yellow card) 17'; Saidov (yellow card) 38'; M.Shikhbabayev 68'; R.Machilov (yellow card) 87'	Stadium: Central Stadium; Attendance: 15,000; Referee: Lasha Verulidze

20 April 2021 25	Anzhi Makhachkala	1 – 1	Spartak Nalchik	Makhachkala
16:00 MSK (UTC+3)	D.Abdulkadyrov (yellow card) 20'; M.Shikhbabayev (yellow card) 26'; Ma.Magomedov (yellow card) 65'; R.Magomedov 85'	Report	A.Olmezov 42'; Pashtov (yellow card) 66'; Antipov (yellow card) 77'; Z.Shumakhov (yellow card) 88'	Stadium: RDYUSSH MinObrNauki RD - Polytech; Attendance: 200; Referee: Anatoly Zhabchenko

26	Bye
MSK (UTC+3)

4 May 2021 27	Dynamo Stavropol	3 – 2	Anzhi Makhachkala	Stavropol
15:00 MSK (UTC+3)	Toboyev 5'; Kurachinov 12', 38'; A.Kurachinov (yellow card) 75'; Kushniruk (yellow card) 84'	Report	M.Shikhbabayev 36'; S.Isalov 69'; D.Abdulkadyrov (yellow card) 87'; S.Isayev (yellow card) 90+'	Stadium: Dynamo Stadium; Attendance: 300; Referee: B.A. Golovko

11 May 2021 28	Anzhi Makhachkala	2 – 2	Makhachkala	Makhachkala
16:00 MSK (UTC+3)	C.Agabalayev 22'; R.Magomedov (yellow card) 36' (yellow-red card) 70'; M.Yagyayev (yellow card) 82' (goal) 90+' (pen.)	Report	Z.Yusupov (yellow card) 16'; I.Abdulayev (yellow card) 47'; R.Abduragimov 55'; Khalimbekov 57'; K.Ibragimov (yellow card) 79'	Stadium: RDYUSSH MinObrNauki RD - Polytech; Attendance: 300; Referee: Igor Kaplenkov

16 May 2021 29	Kuban Krasnodar	5 – 1	Anzhi Makhachkala	Krasnodar
19:00 MSK (UTC+3)	A.Shulgin 6'; Mamtov 13' (pen.); V.Manko 48', 56'; Sidorov (yellow card) 57'; Shalayev (yellow card) 63'; Rybin (yellow card) 70'; Arkhipov 81'	Report	Gaydarov (yellow card) 27'; Ma.Magomedov (yellow card) 38'; M.Shikhbabayev 84'	Stadium: Kuban Stadium; Referee: Pavel Shishkin

20 May 2021 30	Anzhi Makhachkala	6 – 1	Inter Cherkessk	Makhachkala
17:00 MSK (UTC+3)	Saidov 17'; S.Isalov 26'; A.Shikhanmatov (yellow card) 39'; S.Abdurazakov 65'; M.Yagyayev (yellow card) 66' (goal) 70' (pen.); C.Agabalayev 76'; Ma.Magomedov 78'	Report	R.Bostanov 41' (pen.)	Stadium: RDYUSSH MinObrNauki RD - Polytech; Attendance: 200; Referee: Vitaly Ermakov

27 May 2021 31	Tuapse	2 – 6	Anzhi Makhachkala	Tuapse
17:00 MSK (UTC+3)	A.Obolentsev 12', 25' (yellow card) 28'; A.Nikulin (yellow card) 14'	Report	M.Yagyayev (yellow card) 38' (goal) 44' (pen.), 81' (pen.); S.Isalov (yellow card) 45+'; M.Shikhbabayev 58'; C.Agabalayev 82'; R.Magomedov 89'; D.Abdulkadyrov 90+'	Stadium: MBU School No. 6 Attendance: 350; Referee: Andrey Zubov

2 June 2021 32	Anzhi Makhachkala	1 – 0	Mashuk-KMV Pyatigorsk	Makhachkala
17:00 MSK (UTC+3)	S.Abdurazakov (yellow card) 33'; M.Yagyayev (yellow card) 49'; M.Shikhbabayev 66'	Report	V.Antonov (yellow card) 59'; V.Pobedimov (yellow card) 77'	Stadium: RDYUSSH MinObrNauki RD - Polytech; Referee: Inal Tanashev
Note: Match played behind closed doors due to the COVID-19 pandemic.

9 June 2021 33	Forte Taganrog	1 – 0	Anzhi Makhachkala	Taganrog
18:30 MSK (UTC+3)	I.Zakharov 5'; Vyatkin (yellow card) 29'; Morgunov (yellow card) 62'; Moskalenko (yellow card) 90+'	Report	Gaydarov (yellow card) 21'; C.Agabalayev (yellow card) 33'; R.Machilov (yellow card) 69'; Ma.Magomedov (yellow card) 88'	Stadium: Forte Arena; Attendance: 956; Referee: Vitaly Doroshenko

15 June 2021 34	Anzhi Makhachkala	5 – 1	Druzhba Maykop	Makhachkala
17:00 MSK (UTC+3)	M.Shikhbabayev 14', 39'; C.Agabalayev 33'; Ma.Magomedov 43'; R.Kalaev 80'	Report	A.Konov (yellow card) 35' (penalty missed) 84'; Y.Andreychenko (yellow card) 67'; R.Khagur 76'; M.Delok (yellow card) 79'	Stadium: RDYUSSH MinObrNauki RD - Polytech; Attendance: 300; Referee: Vladislav Shipkov

==== League table ====
Pos	Team	Pld	W	D	L	GF	GA	GD	Pts
4	Legion Dynamo	32	16	13	3	56	22	+34	61
5	SKA Rostov-on-Don	32	18	5	9	70	34	+36	59
6	Anzhi	32	14	9	9	59	43	+16	51
7	Dynamo Stavropol	32	14	6	12	51	45	+6	48
8	Makhachkala	32	13	8	11	48	42	+6	47

Rules for classification: 1. points won; 2. games won; 3. points in head-to-head matches; 4. games won in head-to-head matches; 5. goal difference in head-to-head matches; 6. goals scored in head-to-head matches; 7. away goals in head-to-head matches; 8. total goal difference; 9. total goals scored; 10. total away goals scored.

=== Russian Cup ===
5 August 2020 Round of 1/256	Anzhi Makhachkala	1 – 0	Makhachkala	Makhachkala
16:30 MSK (UTC+3)	S.Isalov 44'; Gaydarov (yellow card); M.Khanmurzayev (yellow card); D.Ipayev (yellow card); Saidov (yellow card); D.Abdulkadyrov (yellow card)	Report	A.Temukov (red card) 90'; K.Girayev (yellow card); M.Saidov (yellow card); Agalarov (yellow card); Gazimagomedov (yellow card); M.Abakarov (yellow card)	Stadium: Russian Children's Youth Sports School; Attendance: 0 Referee: Sergey Smirnov
Note: Match played behind closed doors due to the COVID-19 pandemic.

18 August 2020 Round of 1/128	Legion Dynamo Makhachkala	1 – 0	Anzhi Makhachkala	Makhachkala
16:00 MSK (UTC+3)	S.Saaduyev (yellow card) 52'; S.Shalbuzov (yellow card) 61'; R.Shikhayev 71'; P.Medzhidov (yellow card) 79'	Report	R.Machilov (yellow card) 54'; S.Isalov (yellow card) 77'; M.Khanmurzayev (yellow card) 79'; Ma.Magomedov (yellow card) 81'	Stadium: Dynamo Stadium; Attendance: 0 Referee: Vitaliy Eremakov
Note: Match played behind closed doors due to the COVID-19 pandemic.

== Squad statistics ==
As of match played 15 June 2021

=== Appearances and goals ===
No.	Pos	Nat	Player	Total		PFL		Russian Cup	
No.	Pos	Nat	Player	Apps	Goals	Apps	Goals	Apps	Goals
1	GK	(Russia) RUS	Timur Magomedov	33	0	30+1	0	2	0
2	DF	(Russia) RUS	Magomednabi Yagyayev	30	11	28	11	2	0
3	DF	(Russia) RUS	Dzhamaludin Ipayev	20	0	16+2	0	2	0
4	DF	(Russia) RUS	Rustam Machilov	28	3	24+3	3	1	0
5	DF	(Russia) RUS	Alikadi Saidov	30	1	27+1	1	2	0
6	MF	(Russia) RUS	Magomednur Isayev	20	0	3+15	0	0+2	0
7	MF	(Russia) RUS	Magomed Magomedov	32	12	27+3	12	1+1	0
8	MF	(Russia) RUS	Mutaalim Magomedov	33	1	24+7	1	1+1	0
9	MF	(Russia) RUS	Razhab Magomedov	14	3	9+4	3	1	0
10	MF	(Russia) RUS	Chingiz Agabalayev	31	4	23+7	4	1	0
13	DF	(Russia) RUS	Dzhambulat Abdulkadyrov	23	1	3+18	1	1+1	0
14	MF	(Russia) RUS	Sultan Isalov	32	4	22+8	3	1+1	1
15	DF	(Russia) RUS	Radzhab Gusengadzhiyev	21	0	15+6	0	0	0
17	FW	(Russia) RUS	Ruslan Kalaev	9	1	0+8	1	1	0
19	FW	(Russia) RUS	Salautdin Batyrbekov	1	0	0+1	0	0	0
20	DF	(Russia) RUS	Marat Ramazanov	1	0	0+1	0	0	0
21	DF	(Russia) RUS	Shamil Abdurazakov	17	1	6+11	1	0	0
22	FW	(Russia) RUS	Yusuf Aliev	1	0	0+1	0	0	0
25	MF	(Russia) RUS	Oscar Isakov	2	0	0+2	0	0	0
33	FW	(Russia) RUS	Shamil Asildarov	8	0	1+7	0	0	0
37	MF	(Russia) RUS	Islam Khalimbekov	15	0	3+10	0	1+1	0
41	MF	(Russia) RUS	Ahmed Ismailov	18	1	5+13	1	0	0
43	DF	(Russia) RUS	Yusup Vagabov	1	0	0+1	0	0	0
51	MF	(Russia) RUS	Abdurakhman Abdulaev	2	0	1+1	0	0	0
54	GK	(Russia) RUS	Adam Shikhanmatov	3	0	2+1	0	0	0
70	FW	(Russia) RUS	Muslim Shikhbabayev	28	11	22+5	11	1	0
77	DF	(Russia) RUS	Umar Magomedbekov	21	0	16+4	0	0+1	0
79	FW	(Russia) RUS	Arsanbeg Murtazaliev	2	0	0+2	0	0	0
88	MF	(Russia) RUS	Shakhban Gaydarov	27	1	24+1	1	2	0
93	MF	(Russia) RUS	Shikhamir Isayev	22	0	7+13	0	0+2	0
	DF	(Russia) RUS	Mukhtar Khanmurzayev	16	2	14	2	2	0
Players away from the club on loan:
Players who left Anzhi Makhachkala during the season:

=== Goal scorers ===
Place	Position	Nation	Number	Name	PFL	Russian Cup	Total
1	MF	(Russia)	7	Magomed Magomedov	12	0	12
2	DF	(Russia)	2	Magomednabi Yagyayev	11	0	11
2	FW	(Russia)	70	Muslim Shikhbabayev	11	0	11
4	MF	(Russia)	10	Chingiz Agabalayev	4	0	4
4	MF	(Russia)	14	Sultan Isalov	3	1	4
6	DF	(Russia)	4	Rustam Machilov	3	0	3
6	FW	(Russia)	9	Razhab Magomedov	3	0	3
6				Own goal	3	0	3
9	DF	(Russia)	3	Mukhtar Khanmurzayev	2	0	2
10	MF	(Russia)	88	Shakhban Gaydarov	1	0	1
10	MF	(Russia)	41	Ahmed Ismailov	1	0	1
10	MF	(Russia)	8	Mutaalim Magomedov	1	0	1
10	DF	(Russia)	5	Alikadi Saidov	1	0	1
10	DF	(Russia)	21	Shamil Abdurazakov	1	0	1
10	DF	(Russia)	13	Dzhambulat Abdulkadyrov	1	0	1
10	MF	(Russia)	17	Ruslan Kalaev	1	0	1
				TOTALS	59	1	60

=== Clean sheets ===
Place	Position	Nation	Number	Name	PFL	Russian Cup	Total
1	GK	(Russia)	1	Timur Magomedov	7	1	8
				TOTALS	7	1	8

=== Disciplinary record ===
Number	Nation	Position	Name	PFL		Russian Cup		Total	
Number	Nation	Position	Name	Booked	Sent off (straight red)	Booked	Sent off (straight red)	Booked	Sent off (straight red)
1	(Russia)	GK	Timur Magomedov	1	0	0	0	1	0
2	(Russia)	DF	Magomednabi Yagyayev	12	2	0	0	12	2
3	(Russia)	DF	Mukhtar Khanmurzayev	5	0	2	0	7	0
4	(Russia)	DF	Rustam Machilov	5	0	1	0	6	0
5	(Russia)	DF	Alikadi Saidov	3	0	1	0	4	0
6	(Russia)	MF	Magomednur Isayev	2	0	0	0	2	0
7	(Russia)	MF	Magomed Magomedov	11	0	1	0	12	0
8	(Russia)	MF	Mutaalim Magomedov	1	0	0	0	1	0
9	(Russia)	MF	Razhab Magomedov	2	1	0	0	2	1
10	(Russia)	MF	Chingiz Agabalayev	7	0	0	0	7	0
13	(Russia)	DF	Dzhambulat Abdulkadyrov	4	0	1	0	5	0
14	(Russia)	MF	Sultan Isalov	3	0	1	0	4	0
15	(Russia)	DF	Radzhab Gusengadzhiyev	3	0	0	0	3	0
16	(Russia)	DF	Dzhamaludin Ipayev	11	1	1	0	12	1
21	(Russia)	DF	Shamil Abdurazakov	2	0	0	0	2	0
33	(Russia)	FW	Shamil Asildarov	1	0	0	0	1	0
37	(Russia)	MF	Islam Khalimbekov	1	0	0	0	1	0
41	(Russia)	MF	Ahmed Ismailov	1	0	0	0	1	0
54	(Russia)	GK	Adam Shikhanmatov	1	0	0	0	1	0
70	(Russia)	FW	Muslim Shikhbabayev	5	0	0	0	5	0
77	(Russia)	DF	Umar Magomedbekov	2	0	0	0	2	0
88	(Russia)	MF	Shakhban Gaydarov	9	2	1	0	10	2
93	(Russia)	MF	Shikhamir Isayev	3	0	0	0	3	0
Players who left Anzhi Makhachkala during the season:
			TOTALS	97	7	9	0	106	7
