= Zakirov =

Zakirov or Zokirov (Russian: Закиров), feminine: Zakirova or Zokirova, is a Central Asian patronymic surname derived from the given name Zakir using the Russian-language patronymic suffix -ov.. Notable people with the surname include:

- Abdulla Zakirov (1918–1981), Chinese politician from Xinjiang
- Alexander Zakirov (born 1992), Russian ice hockey player
- Botir Zokirov (1936–1985), Uzbek singer, painter and actor
- Farrukh Zokirov (born 1946), Uzbek singer
- Ghali Zakirov (1910–1944), Soviet soldier
- Jamshid Zokirov (1948–2012), Uzbek film and theater actor
- Marat Zakirov (born 1973), Russian water polo player
- Nematjan Zakirov (born 1962), Kyrgyzstani footballer
- Nargiz Zakirova, American-Uzbek singer
- Qodir Zokirov (1906–1992), Uzbek botanist and educator
- Rustam Zakirov (born 1989), Kyrgyzstani footballer
- Sanjar Zokirov (born 1983), Uzbek judoka
- Timur Zakirov (disambiguation)
- Umidaxon Zakirova (born 1971), Uzbek politician
- Javoxir Zakirov (born 1972), Uzbek singer and film actor
- Gavhar Zakirova (born 1949), Uzbek film and theater actor
- Rano Zakirova (born 1969), Uzbek film actor
