= Zaker =

Zaker may refer to:

- Zaker, East Azerbaijan, a village in East Azerbaijan Province, Iran
- Zaker, Kerman, a village in Kerman Province, Iran
- Zaker, Zanjan, a village in Zanjan Province, Iran
- Zaker, Tarom, a village in Zanjan Province, Iran
- Aly Zaker (1944–2020), Bangladeshi actor and director
- Sara Zaker, Bangladeshi actor, entrepreneur and social activist, wife of Aly Zaker
- Zafar Zaker, Iranian para-athlete
