= Timur Zakirov =

Timur Zakirov may refer to:

- Timur Zakirov (footballer, born 1970), Russian football player
- Timur Zakirov (footballer, born 1996), Russian football player
