= Jamshid Zokirov =

Uzbek film and theater actor

- Born: July 11, 1948; Tashkent, Uzbek SSR, Soviet Union
- Died: April 7, 2012 (aged 63); Tashkent, Uzbekistan
- Occupation: actor
- Years active: 1971—2012
- Spouse: Gavhar Zokirova
- Awards: Meritorious Artist of Uzbekistan (1995)

Jamshid Zokirov (Note: Uzbek: Jamshid Zokirov, Жамшид Зокиров; Russian: Джамшид Закиров, romanized: Dzhamshid Zakirov.) (July 11, 1948 – April 7, 2012) was an Uzbek actor. He became a Meritorious Artist of Uzbekistan in 1995.

== Early life ==
Jamshid Zakirov was born on July 11, 1948, in Tashkent. In 1971, he graduated from the Theater and Art Institute.

== Career ==
He worked at the National Drama Theater of Uzbekistan. In 1995, he was awarded Honored Artist of Uzbekistan.

== Personal life ==
Jamshid Zakirov died of cancer on April 7, 2012, in Tashkent. His wife remained by his side during his time of illness. Jamshid Zakirov was buried alongside his father, Karim Zakirov, and brother, Botir Zakirov, at Chigʻatoy Cemetery in Tashkent.

Zakirov is the father of Javokhir Zakirov, an actor, director and singer, formerly a member of the Bolalar group. Zakirov's brother Batyr Zakirov (1936-1985), was a Soviet singer, artist and writer. His other brother Farrukh Zakirov is a singer and artistic director of the Uzbek ensemble "Yalla".

Zakirov married Gavkhar Zakirova, a Soviet and Uzbek actress.

He is the uncle of singer Nargiz Zakirova (b. 1970).

== Filmography ==
- Улица тринадцати тополей (The Street of Thirteen Poplars) (1969)
- Kelinlar qoʻzgʻoloni (Russian: Бунт невесток) (The Rebellion of the Brides) (1984)
- Объятие мечты (The Embrace of a Dream) (1986)
- Pushaymon (Russian: Горечь падения) (Regret) (1987)
- Бархан (Sand Dune) (1989)
- Temir xotin (Russian: Чудо-женщина) (The Iron Woman) (1990)
- Счастье мое, ты оплачено кровью (My Happiness, Paid with Blood) (1993)
- Shaytanat (2000) (TV series)
- Платина (Platinum) (2007) (TV series) (not credited in the film)
- След саламандры (The Salamander Trail) (2009)
- Suv yoqalab (Along the Water) (2009)
- Высоцкий. Спасибо, что живой (Vysotsky. Thank You For Being Alive) (2011)
