= Eson Kandov =

Bukharan Jewish musician and singer

Isaac Ilyich Kandov
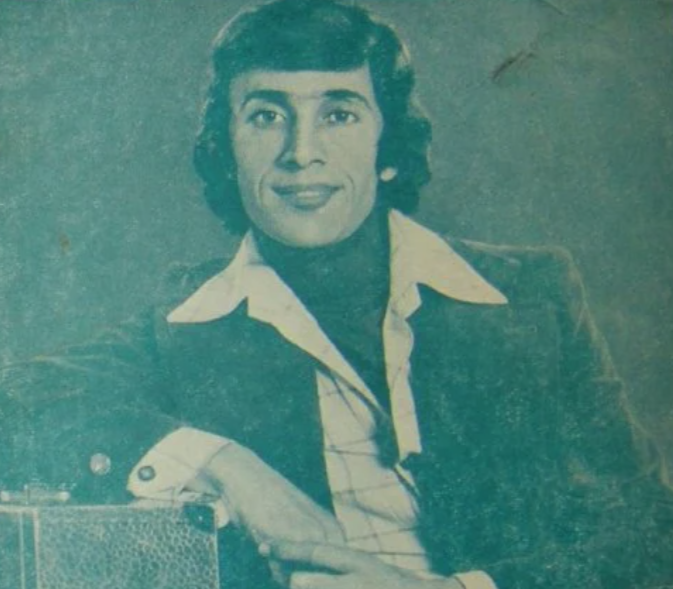
- Born: October 31, 1941; Tashkent, Uzbek SSR, Soviet Union
- Occupation: Singer

Eson Kandov (born 1941) was a singer and musician from Uzbekistan with a successful career during the 1960-80s. He was awarded the distinction as Honored Artist of the Uzbek SSR in 1974 and is considered the first artist who represented the Republic of Uzbekistan on the international stage at the Sopot Festival "Sopot-73".

His albums and EPs were successfully distributed throughout the Soviet Union through the major record label Melodiya in the 1970s and 1980s.

== Early life ==
He was born as the second son into a family of Bukharian Jews. His father was a teacher of the Uzbek language and his mother was a housewife who worked in the financial administration when he was young. During his childhood his maternal grandfather, who had lyrical baritone voice, and his mother often sang to him on weekends or on holidays.

== Education ==
After graduating from school, Eson Kandov entered the acting department of the Theater and Art Institute, and from the second year he chose to enter the Tashkent State Conservatory. At the conservatory he mainly learned classical singing. After successfully participating in a competition at the Conservatory in 1964, he was accepted as a soloist and singer in the Variety Orchestra of Uzbekistan.

His real name at birth was Isaac Ilyich Kandov, but early into his career singer Botir Zokirov suggested adopting the name Eson as it sounded more romantic and artistic. Over the 25 year long career in the Soviet Union, he grew into the name so much that he couldn’t imagine associating with a different name.

== Career ==
Eson Kandov was among the singers who appeared as a soloist in the Estrada Symphony Orchestra, which was founded in the Uzbek Soviet Republic for state television and radio in 1963. The Estrada Orchestra consisted of a large string section, saxophones, trumpets, trombones, guitars, piano and drums, and occasionally instruments from older Uzbek music traditions. Along with singers such as Botir Zokirov, Luiza Zokirova and Elmira Urazbaeva, he is considered a co-founder of modern Uzbek pop music with traditional influences in the 1960s.

In 1973 he represented the Soviet Union at the Sopot International Song Festival with the song “Ormonlarga konarokshom” (translated from Uzbek as “Evening falls on the forests”) in the Forest Opera, Sopot, Poland. In the same year, on the basis of the Uzbek Variety Orchestra, the Tashkent Music Hall was created, where he was the leading soloist and singer. Since 1974 he has been collaborating with the state ensemble "Yalla". With Yalla, he toured a dozen European countries as well as across all over the Soviet Union. In 1977 when the state ensemble "Navo" was formed, he became its soloist singer. After he moved to Israel in 1991, he founded his own ensemble "Shirey a Olam" ("Songs of the World"), which was active until 1997. However, even though he had a high number of performances in Israel, he was unable to repeat the earlier big successes he had in the Soviet Union. He continued to work as a teacher and coach for young musicians.

== Personal life ==
He has one son, Gabriel, with his wife Mira, who he married in Tashkent in 1982. The family currently lives in Israel, in Petah Tikva.

== Discography ==
Year (P)	Number	Original title	Title in English	Format	Label, country
1973	Д 00034397-8	Эсон Кандов – Барно	Eson Kandov - Barno	Vinyl, 7", 33 ⅓ RPM	Melodiya, USSR
1974	М60-36595-6	Узбекская эстрада	Uzbek Estrada	LP, Green vinyl	Melodiya, USSR
1976	М60-39403-4	ЭСТРАДНАЯ МУЗЫКА КОМПОЗИТОРОВ УЗБЕКИСТАНА	POPULAR MUSIC BY UZBEK COMPOSERS	LP, Mono, Yellow	Melodiya, USSR
1976	М62-39529-30	Узбекские эстрадные песни	Uzbek Estrada pop songs	7", 33 ⅓ RPM, Mono, Yellow	Melodiya, USSR
1977	М60-40359-60	ПЕСНИ Ш. РАМАЗАНОВА (1910).	SONGS OF SH. RAMAZANOVA (1910).	LP	Melodiya, USSR
1987	Г62—06887-8	Поёт Эсон Кандов	Eson Kandov Singing	Flexi-disc, 7", 33 ⅓ RPM, Mono	Melodiya, USSR
1979	С62-12121-2	Эсон Кандов – Не Успокоимся	Eson Kandov - Let's not rest	7", 33 ⅓ RPM	Melodiya, USSR
1979	С60-13079—80	УЗБЕКСКАЯ ЭСТРАДНАЯ МУЗЫКА	Uzbek Estrada Music	Album	Melodiya, USSR
1983	С62 20053 008	Эсон Кандов, Наво – Ливанские Кедры	Eson Kandov and the ensemble Navo - Lebanese Cedars	7", 33 ⅓ RPM	Melodiya, USSR
1984	С62 20821 008	ПЕСНИ НА СТИХИ ТАТЬЯНЫ КОРШИЛОВОЙ	SONGS TO VERSES BY TATIANA KORSHILOVA	7", 33 ⅓ RPM	Melodiya, USSR
1986	АБП 0038	СУЛТАНОВА Надира.	SULTANOV Nadira.		
1987	С62 24569 003	КАНДОВ Эсон. «Дом родной»:	KANDOV Eson. «Home»:		
1989	С60 28883 001	КАНДОВ Эсон. «Ветер странствий».	KANDOV Eson. «Wind of Wanderings».	LP	Melodiya, USSR
2016	MEL CO 0234	Летняя Мелодия. 50 песен для лета	Summer Melody. 50 songs for the summer		Melodiya, USSR
2021		Ностальгия по СССР (Любимые хиты)	Nostalgia for the USSR (Favorite hits)		

=== Selection of songs ===
- Boi, boi / Бой, бой
- Bukharian Wedding / бухарская свадьба
- Емина / Emina
- Romansi / Романсы
- Song about Tashkent / Песня о Ташкенте with Yunus Turaev and Naufal Zakirov (in 1965)
