= Dmitri Zornikov =

Russian footballer

Personal information
- Full name: Dmitri Sergeyevich Zornikov
- Date of birth: 28 April 1997 (age 29)
- Place of birth: Balashikha, Russia
- Height: 1.93 m (6 ft 4 in)
- Position: Goalkeeper

Senior career*
Years	Team	Apps	(Gls)
2015–2018	FC Khimki	2	(0)
2018–2019	FC Rotor Volgograd	0	(0)
2018	→ FC Rotor-2 Volgograd	15	(0)
2019–2020	FC Inter Cherkessk	10	(0)
2020–2021	FC Yessentuki	30	(0)
- * Club domestic league appearances and goals

Dmitri Sergeyevich Zornikov (Russian: Дмитрий Сергеевич Зорников; born 28 April 1997) is a Russian former football player.

== Club career ==
He made his debut in the Russian Professional Football League for FC Khimki on 23 May 2016 in a game against FC Spartak Kostroma. He made his Russian Football National League debut for Khimki on 12 November 2017 in a game against PFC Krylia Sovetov Samara.

In June 2021, Zornikov was banned from playing for 5 years by the Russian Football Union for betting on games.
