= Farrukh Zokirov =

Uzbek and Soviet singer (born 1946)

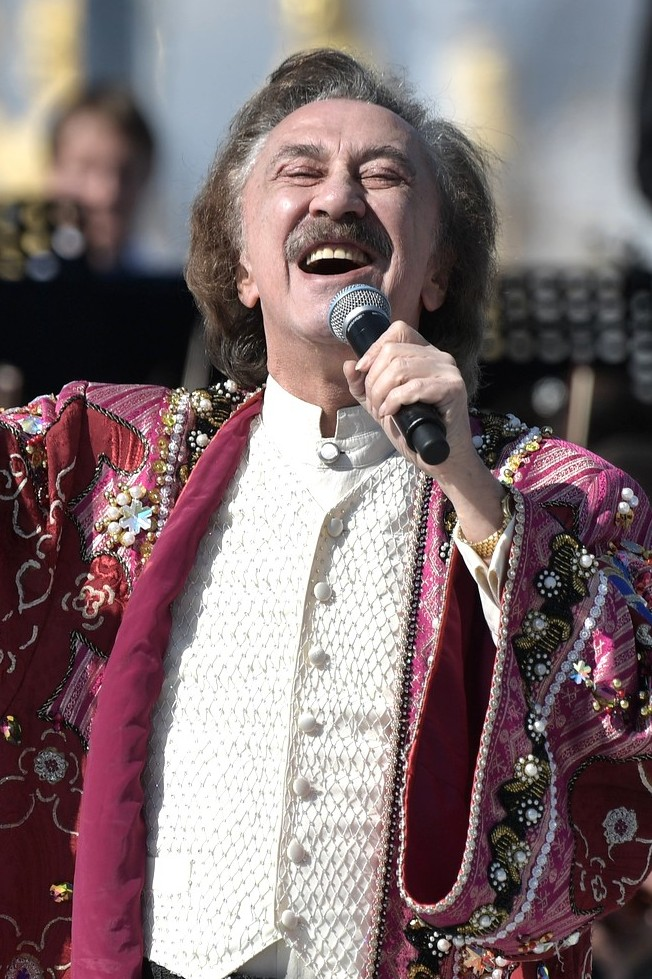

Background information
- Born: 16 April 1946 (age 79); Tashkent, Uzbek SSR, Soviet Union
- Genres: Estrada
- Occupations: Singer, composer, actor
- Instruments: vocals, piano,
- Years active: 1969–present
- Labels: Melodiya

Farrukh Karimovich Zokirov (Uzbek: Фаррух Каримович (Карим ўғли) Зокиров, [fæˈrux kæˈrɯməvʲɪt͡ɕ (kæˈrɯm oˈɣlɯ) zɑˈkɯrəf], Russian: Фарру́х Кари́мович Заки́ров, born 16 April 1946) is an Uzbek and Soviet singer, composer and actor. He has been artistic director of folk rock band Yalla since 1976. Zokirov has been voted People's Artist in six states of the republic, and he is a laureate of the State Prize of Uzbekistan. From May 2002 to July 2004, he was deputy minister of the Ministry of Culture and Sports of the Republic of Uzbekistan.

== Biography ==
Zokirov was born in Tashkent in 1946 into a family of professional musicians. His father, Karim Zokirov, was an opera singer, a baritone and People's Artist of Uzbek SSR in 1939, and the soloist of the Uzbek State Opera and Ballet Theatre named after Alisher Navoi. His Mother, Shohista Saidova, was also a singer, a folk singer, a soloist for the Tashkent musical theatre of drama and Mukimi comedy. His parents met while studying at the Moscow Conservatory. The family had five sons and a daughter: Batir, Louise, Naufal, Farrukh, Jamshid, Ravshan. The children grew up in a house that was often visited by leading Uzbek artists and singers of the time. The art atmosphere and creativity nourished the children from an early age. This way, the Zokirov musical and artistic dynasty was formed in Tashkent.

== Family ==
- Father – Karim Zokirov (1912–1977), opera singer (baritone), People's Artist of the Uzbek SSR
- Mother – Shohista Saidova
- Spouse(s) – Anna Zokirova, Nargiz Boyhonova
- Brother – Botir Zokirov, (1936–1985), Uzbek Soviet singer, writer, poet, artist and actor, founder of pop art in the country, People's Artist of the Uzbek SSR
- Brother – Jamshid Zokirov (1949–2012), Soviet and Uzbek film and theatre actor, TV presenter, honoured artist of Uzbekistan
- Sister – Louise Zokirova, singer
- Niece – Nargiz Zakirova, daughter of Louise Zakirova, singer

== Filmography ==
Film
Year	Title	Role	Notes
1978	Toʻylar muborak (Happy Wedding Day!) (Подарю тебе город)	Himself	Uncredited cameo
1980	Какие наши годы!	Himself	Uncredited cameo
1989	Tangalik bolalar	Himself	Uncredited cameo
200...	Maysara – Superstar		Musical movie. Also director
2000	Alpamysh (Alpomish)		
2003	Taqdir	Davlat Zokirov	Lead role
2003	Munis onam	Himself	Uncredited cameo
2010	Ялла...начало...	Himself	Documentary

== Honorary titles and awards ==
- People's Artist of the Uzbek SSR
- People's Artist of Karakalpakstan
- People's Artist of Kazakhstan
- People's Artist of Kyrgyzstan
- People's Artist of Tajikistan
- People's Artist of Ingushetia
- People's Artist of Azerbaijan

During the 1991 summer, documents were filed for registration of the title of People's Artist of the Soviet Union, however, due to the Soviet coup d'état attempt during August 1991, this process was not concluded.
