= Georgi Kuchiyev =

Russian footballer

Personal information
- Full name: Georgi Stanislavovich Kuchiyev
- Date of birth: 1 January 1998 (age 28)
- Place of birth: Vladikavkaz, Russia
- Height: 1.85 m (6 ft 1 in)
- Position: Forward

Senior career*
Years	Team	Apps	(Gls)
2013	LFK Rubin Kazan		
2015–2018	FC Tyumen	21	(1)
2017–2018	→ FC Spartak Vladikavkaz (loan)	23	(1)
2018–2019	FC Spartak Vladikavkaz	20	(3)
2019–2020	FC Inter Cherkessk	30	(6)
2021	PFC Dynamo Stavropol	30	(5)
2022	FC Mashuk-KMV Pyatigorsk	26	(10)
- * Club domestic league appearances and goals

Georgi Stanislavovich Kuchiyev (Russian: Георгий Станиславович Кучиев; born 1 January 1998) is a Russian former football player.

== Club career ==
He made his debut in the Russian Football National League for FC Tyumen on 20 July 2015 in a game against FC Sibir Novosibirsk.
