= Anzur Sadirov =

Russian footballer

Personal information
- Full name: Anzur Umamudinovich Sadirov
- Date of birth: 4 October 1978 (age 48)
- Place of birth: Usukhchay, Dagestan, Russian SFSR
- Height: 1.74 m (5 ft 8 1/2 in)
- Positions: Midfielder; defender

Team information
- Current team: FC Dynamo Makhachkala (assistant coach)

Youth career
- Olimpia Makhachkala
- RSDYuShOR-2 Makhachkala

Senior career*
Years	Team	Apps	(Gls)
1996	FC Anzhi-2 Kaspiysk	32	(2)
1997	FC Anzhi-d Makhachkala	37	(1)
1998–2000	FC Dynamo Makhachkala	101	(14)
2000	Shahdag Qusar FK	2	(0)
2001–2006	FC Dynamo Makhachkala	231	(40)
2007–2008	FC Baltika Kaliningrad	55	(7)
2008	FC Dynamo Bryansk	18	(0)
2009	FC Volgar-Gazprom-2 Astrakhan	31	(4)
2010	FC Fakel Voronezh	5	(1)
2011	FC Biolog-Novokubansk Progress	13	(5)
2011–2012	FC Dagdizel Kaspiysk	21	(1)

Managerial career
- 2017: FC Anzhi Makhachkala (assistant)
- 2017–2018: FC Anzhi-2 Makhachkala
- 2018–2019: FC Legion-Dynamo Makhachkala
- 2019–2020: FC Mashuk-KMV Pyatigorsk
- 2021–2022: FC Biolog-Novokubansk (assistant)
- 2022: FC Chayka Peschanokopskoye (assistant)
- 2022: FC Chayka Peschanokopskoye
- 2023–2024: FC Chayka Peschanokopskoye (head scout)
- 2024–: FC Dynamo Makhachkala (assistant)
- * Club domestic league appearances and goals

Anzur Umamudinovich Sadirov (Russian: Анзур Умамудинович Садиров; born 4 October 1978) is a Russian professional football coach and a former player. He is an assistant coach with FC Dynamo Makhachkala.

== Playing career ==
He made his Russian Football National League debut for FC Dynamo Makhachkala on 28 March 2004 in a game against FC Lisma-Mordovia Saransk. He played 6 seasons in the FNL for Dynamo Makhachkala, FC Baltika Kaliningrad, FC Dynamo Bryansk and FC Volgar-Gazprom Astrakhan.

== Personal life ==
His younger brother Artur Sadirov was also a professional footballer.
