= Gamid Agalarov =

Russian footballer (born 2000)

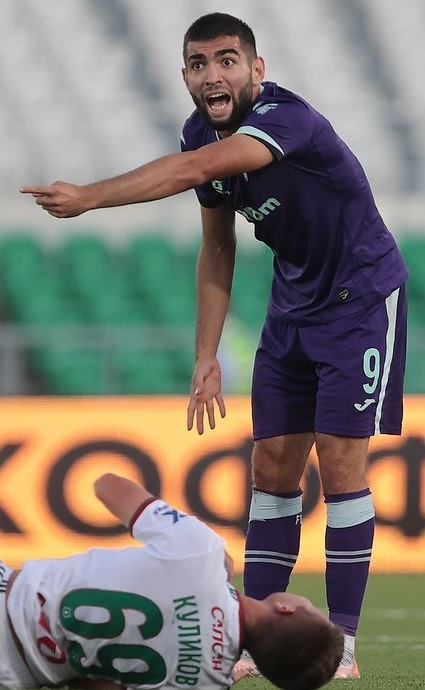
- Agalarov with FC Ufa in 2021

Personal information
- Full name: Gamid Ruslanovich Agalarov
- Date of birth: 16 July 2000 (age 26)
- Place of birth: Makhachkala, Russia
- Height: 1.80 m (5 ft 11 in)
- Position: Forward

Team information
- Current team: Dynamo Makhachkala
- Number: 25

Youth career
- Anzhi Makhachkala

Senior career*
Years	Team	Apps	(Gls)
2017–2018	Anzhi-2 Makhachkala	2	(0)
2018–2019	Anzhi Makhachkala	22	(5)
2020–2022	Ufa	39	(19)
2021	→ Volgar Astrakhan (loan)	14	(5)
2022–2024	Akhmat Grozny	44	(6)
2024–	Dynamo Makhachkala	67	(19)

International career^{‡}
2018	Russia U18	6	(4)
2018–2019	Russia U19	11	(3)
2020	Russia U20	3	(2)
2021	Russia U21	4	(4)
- * Club domestic league appearances and goals as of 22 November 2026 ‡ National team caps and goals as of 16 November 2021

Gamid Ruslanovich Agalarov (Russian: Гамид Русланович Агаларов; born 16 July 2000) is a Russian football player who plays as a centre-forward for Dynamo Makhachkala.

== Club career ==
He made his debut in the Russian Professional Football League for Anzhi-2 Makhachkala on 11 May 2018 in a game against Krasnodar-2.

He made his debut in the Russian Premier League for Anzhi Makhachkala on 28 July 2018 in a game against Ural Yekaterinburg.

On 24 January 2020 he signed a long-term contract with Russian Premier League club Ufa. On 22 January 2021, he joined Volgar Astrakhan on loan. He became the top scorer of the 2021–22 Russian Premier League with 19 goals scored. He was also voted best Under-21 player of the season by the league.

On 15 July 2022, Agalarov signed a three-year contract with Akhmat Grozny.

On 21 August 2024, Agalarov moved to Dynamo Makhachkala.

== International career ==
He was called up to the Russia national football team for the first time for October 2021 World Cup qualifiers against Slovakia and Slovenia.

== Personal life ==
His father is Ruslan Agalarov and his uncle is Kamil Agalarov.

== Career statistics ==
As of match played 22 November 2026

Appearances and goals by club, season and competition
Club	Season	League			Cup		Other		Total	
Club	Season	Division	Apps	Goals	Apps	Goals	Apps	Goals	Apps	Goals
Anzhi-2 Makhachkala	2017–18	Russian Second League	2	0	—		—		2	0
Anzhi Makhachkala	2018–19	Russian Premier League	7	0	0	0	—		7	0
Anzhi Makhachkala	2019–20	Russian Second League	15	5	0	0	—		15	5
Anzhi Makhachkala	Total		22	5	0	0	0	0	22	5
Ufa	2019–20	Russian Premier League	5	0	0	0	—		5	0
Ufa	2020–21	Russian Premier League	5	0	0	0	—		5	0
Ufa	2021–22	Russian Premier League	29	19	2	0	2 (Note: Appearances in relegation play-offs)	1	33	20
Ufa	Total		39	19	2	0	2	1	43	20
Volgar Astrakhan (loan)	2020–21	Russian First League	14	5	—		—		14	5
Akhmat Grozny	2022–23	Russian Premier League	22	3	7	2	—		29	5
Akhmat Grozny	2023–24	Russian Premier League	19	3	4	0	—		23	3
Akhmat Grozny	2024–25	Russian Premier League	3	0	1	1	—		4	1
Akhmat Grozny	Total		44	6	12	3	0	0	56	9
Dynamo Makhachkala	2024–25	Russian Premier League	25	7	6	4	—		31	11
Dynamo Makhachkala	2025–26	Russian Premier League	28	7	6	3	2	1	36	11
Dynamo Makhachkala	2026–27	Russian Premier League	14	5	4	1	—		18	6
Dynamo Makhachkala	Total		67	19	16	8	2	1	85	28
Career total			188	54	30	9	4	2	222	65

== Honours ==
Individual

- Russian Premier League Forward of the Season: 2021–22
