= Zakir =

Zakir or Zokir may refer to:

== People ==
- Zokir Almatov (born 1949), Uzbek politician
- Zakir Hasan (cricketer, born 1972) (born 1972), a Bangladeshi cricketer
- Zakir Hasan (cricketer, born 1998) (born 1998), a Bangladeshi cricketer
- Zakir Hussain (disambiguation), multiple people
- Zakir Khan (born 1963), Pakistani cricketer
- Zakir Naik (born 1965), Indian Muslim preacher
- Zakir Qureshi (1967–2025), Pakistani chef, host, hotelier
- Abdul Qayyum Zakir also known as Abdullah Gulam Rasoul (born 1973), Afghan Taliban leader
- Gasim bey Zakir (1786–1857), Azerbaijani poet

== Places ==
- Zakir, East Azerbaijan, a village in East Azerbaijan Province, Iran
- Zakir, Zanjan, a village in Zanjan Province, Iran

== Other ==
- A fictional planet and the alien race that lives there in Another Life (2019 TV series)

== See also ==
- Dhakir
