= Artur Sadirov =

Russian footballer and coach

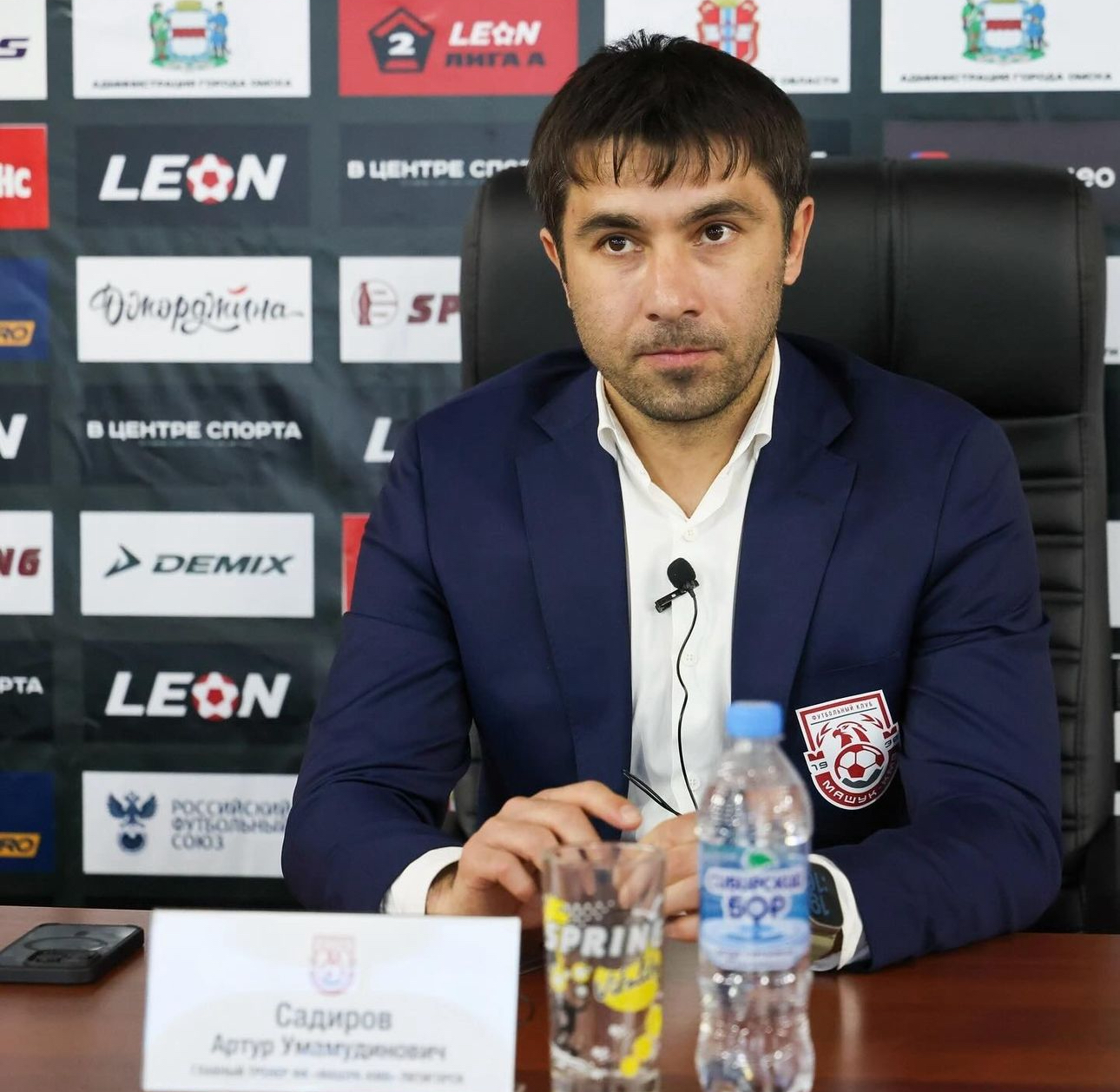

Personal information
- Full name: Artur Umamudinovich Sadirov
- Date of birth: 22 March 1985 (age 41)
- Place of birth: Magaramkent, Dagestan, Russian SFSR
- Height: 1.73 m (5 ft 8 in)
- Positions: Midfielder; forward

Team information
- Current team: FC Mashuk-KMV Pyatigorsk (manager)

Senior career*
Years	Team	Apps	(Gls)
2001–2003	FC Anzhi Makhachkala	0	(0)
2004–2005	FC Dynamo Makhachkala	32	(1)
2006	FC Dynamo Stavropol	9	(1)
2006	FC Dynamo Makhachkala	9	(1)
2007–2008	FC Dynamo Stavropol	32	(3)
2009–2010	FC Mashuk-KMV Pyatigorsk	61	(3)
2011	FC Tyumen	8	(1)
2012	FC Avangard Kursk	6	(0)
2012–2013	FC Dagdizel Kaspiysk	34	(2)
2014–2016	FC Mashuk-KMV Pyatigorsk	79	(8)

Managerial career
- 2017–2019: FC Anzhi Makhachkala (U-21 assistant)
- 2019: FC Anzhi Makhachkala (assistant)
- 2019–2022: FC Anzhi Makhachkala
- 2022: FC Chayka Peschanokopskoye (assistant)
- 2023–: FC Mashuk-KMV Pyatigorsk
- * Club domestic league appearances and goals

Artur Umamudinovich Sadirov (Russian: Артур Умамудинович Садиров; born 22 March 1985) is a Russian professional football coach and a former player. He is the manager of FC Mashuk-KMV Pyatigorsk.

== Coaching career ==
On 28 October 2019 he was appointed caretaker manager of FC Anzhi Makhachkala following the dismissal of Valeri Barmin.

== Personal life ==
His older brother Anzur Sadirov was also a professional footballer.
