= Zakeri =

Zakeri ذاكري
- village
- Location within Iran
- Coordinates: 29°10′36″N 56°21′40″E
- Country: Iran
- Province: Kerman
- County: Baft
- Bakhsh: Central
- Rural District: Fathabad

Population (2006)
  - Total: 41
- Time zone: UTC+3:30 (IRST)
  - Summer (DST): UTC+4:30 (IRDT)

Zakeri (Persian: ذاكري, also Romanized as Zākerī; also known as Zāker) is a village in Fathabad Rural District, in the Central District of Baft County, Kerman Province, Iran. At the 2006 census, its population was 41, in 8 families.
