= Zalim Kishev =

Russian footballer

Personal information
- Full name: Zalim Zaurbiyevich Kishev
- Date of birth: 18 July 1990 (age 36)
- Place of birth: Nalchik, Russia
- Height: 1.70 m (5 ft 7 in)
- Position: Defender

Senior career*
Years	Team	Apps	(Gls)
2009	PFC Spartak-2 Nalchik		
2009–2010	PFC Spartak Nalchik	0	(0)
2011–2014	FC Angusht Nazran	99	(1)
2014–2015	PFC Spartak Nalchik	21	(0)
2015–2016	FC Angusht Nazran	26	(0)
2016	FC Sochi	10	(0)
2017	FC Angusht Nazran	29	(1)
2018	FC Kubanskaya Korona Shevchenko		
2018–2019	FC Mashuk-KMV Pyatigorsk	23	(0)
2019–2021	FC Inter Cherkessk	48	(1)
2021–2022	FC Druzhba Maykop	31	(0)
- * Club domestic league appearances and goals

Zalim Zaurbiyevich Kishev (Russian: Залим Заурбиевич Кишев; born 18 July 1990) is a Russian former football defender.

== Club career ==
He made his debut in the Russian Second Division for FC Angusht Nazran on 17 April 2011 in a game against FC Kavkaztransgaz-2005 Ryzdvyany. He made his Russian Football National League debut for Angusht on 7 July 2013 in a game against FC Neftekhimik Nizhnekamsk.
