= Renat Gagity =

Russian footballer

Personal information
- Full name: Renat Muradovich Gagity
- Date of birth: 20 March 1995 (age 31)
- Place of birth: Oktyabrskoye, Russia
- Height: 1.82 m (6 ft 0 in)
- Position: Midfielder

Team information
- Current team: Merani Martvili
- Number: 30

Senior career*
Years	Team	Apps	(Gls)
2014	Kruoja Pakruojis	0	(0)
2014–2016	Arsenal Tula	1	(0)
2015–2016	→ Arsenal-2 Tula	37	(0)
2017–2018	Spartak Vladikavkaz	36	(1)
2018–2019	Dynamo Stavropol	15	(0)
2019–2020	Inter Cherkessk	32	(0)
2021	Druzhba Maykop	15	(0)
2021–2022	Mashuk-KMV Pyatigorsk	46	(2)
2023–	Merani Martvili	17	(0)
- * Club domestic league appearances and goals as of 2 December 2023

Renat Muradovich Gagity (Russian: Ренат Мурадович Гагиты; born 20 March 1995) is a Russian football player who plays for Georgian Liga 3 club Merani Martvili.

== Club career ==
He made his professional debut in the Russian Football National League for FC Arsenal Tula on 11 July 2015 in a game against FC Baikal Irkutsk.
