= Anton Kushniruk =

Russian footballer

Personal information
- Full name: Anton Anatolyevich Kushniruk
- Date of birth: 30 June 1995 (age 31)
- Place of birth: Novosibirsk, Russia
- Height: 1.86 m (6 ft 1 in)
- Position: Centre back

Senior career*
Years	Team	Apps	(Gls)
2013–2019	FC Sibir Novosibirsk	57	(1)
2013–2016	→ FC Sibir-2 Novosibirsk	64	(1)
2019	FC Olimp Khimki	2	(0)
2020	Akzhayik	12	(0)
2021	PFC Dynamo Stavropol	7	(0)
2021–2023	FC Novosibirsk	36	(1)
- * Club domestic league appearances and goals

Anton Anatolyevich Kushniruk (Russian: Антон Анатольевич Кушнирук; born 30 June 1995) is a Russian former football defender.

== Club career ==
He made his debut in the Russian Second Division for FC Sibir-2 Novosibirsk on 5 June 2013 in a game against FC Sibiryak Bratsk.

He made his Russian Football National League debut for FC Sibir Novosibirsk on 11 July 2016 in a game against FC Spartak-2 Moscow.

In 2020, Kushniruk moved to FC Akzhayik in Kazakhstan.
