= Timur Zakirov (footballer, born 1970) =

Russian footballer and coach

Personal information
- Full name: Timur Ilkhanovich Zakirov
- Date of birth: 14 February 1970 (age 56)
- Height: 1.81 m (5 ft 11 1/2 in)
- Positions: Forward; midfielder

Senior career*
| Years | Team | Apps | (Gls) |
| 1987 | FC Kuban Krasnodar | 4 | (0) |
| 1987 | FC KSK Anapa | | |
| 1988–1994 | FC Spartak Anapa | 187 | (76) |
| 1995 | FC Chernomorets Novorossiysk | 5 | (0) |
| 1995 | FC Pontos Vityazevo | | |
| 1995–1996 | FC Spartak Anapa | 55 | (33) |
| 1996 | FC Pontos Vityazevo | | |
| 1997–1998 | FC Druzhba Maykop | 50 | (6) |
| 1999–2000 | FC Aleks Vityazevo | | |

Managerial career
- 2006: FC Spartak-UGP Anapa
- * Club domestic league appearances and goals

Timur Ilkhanovich Zakirov (Russian: Тимур Ильханович Закиров; born 14 February 1970) is a Russian football coach and a former player.

His son, also named Timur Zakirov, is also a professional footballer.
