= Umidaxon Zakirova =

Uzbek teacher, poet and politician (born 1971)

Member of the Legislative Chamber
- Incumbent
- Assumed office January 2020

Personal details
- Born: 30 September 1971 (age 54) Andijan, Uzbek SSR, Soviet Union (now Uzbekistan)
- Party: UzLiDeP

Umidakhon Ahmadjanova Zakirova (born 30 September 1971) is an Uzbek teacher, poet and politician. Since 2020, Zakirova is deputy of the Legislative Chamber from Andijan constituency No. 9. She is a member of the Uzbekistan Liberal Democratic Party.

== Early life and education ==
Zakirova was born on 30 September 1971 in Andijan. She received higher education, graduating from the Andijan State Pedagogical Institute of Languages in 1994. She then became a teacher of the Russian language and literature.

== Career ==
Zakirova began her career in 1988 as a laboratory assistant at the Andijan Pedagogical Institute of Languages. From 1994 to 2004, she worked as a teacher of Russian language and literature, deputy director for career guidance at secondary school No. 30 in Andijan. From 2004 to 2015, she also served as Deputy Director for Spiritual and Educational Issues at this educational institution. From 2015 to 2019, she served as director of secondary school No. 4 in Andijan. In 2019, she was appointed director of secondary school No. 11 in Andijan.

== Political career ==
In the Legislative Chamber, Zakirova is a member of the Committee on Labor and Social Issues, a member of the Faction of the Movement of Entrepreneurs and Business People as part of the Liberal Democratic Party.

== Personal life ==
In addition to her native Uzbek, Zakirova speaks Russian, Turkish and English. She is married and has three children.

== Awards ==
Zakirova was awarded the "15 years of Independence of Uzbekistan" and "27 years of the Constitution of Uzbekistan" commemorative awards, and the "Excellence in Public Education" badge.
