= Botir Zokirov =

Uzbek singer, actor and painter (1936–1985)

Botir Zokirov Ботир Карим
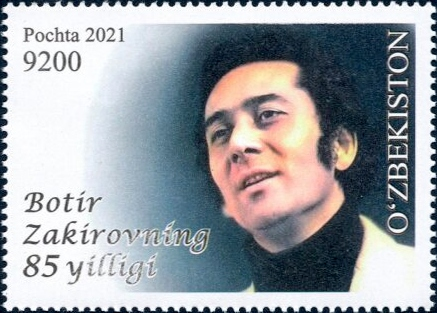
- Zokirov on a 2022 stamp of Uzbekistan

Background information
- Born: Batir Karimovich Zakirov; Ботир Карим ўғли Зокиров; 26 April 1936; Moscow, RSFSR
- Died: January 23, 1985 (aged 48) Tashkent, Uzbek SSR
- Occupations: Singer; writer; poet; painter; actor
- Other name: Batir Zakirov
- Education: Ostrovsky Institute
- Spouses: Erkli Malikbaeva (m. 1957–1974): Galina
- Children: 3
- Parents: Karim Zokirov (father); Shoista Saidova (mother)
- Relatives: Jamshid Zokirov (brother); Farrukh Zokirov (brother); Nargiz Zakirova (niece)
- Awards: People's Artist of the Uzbek SSR, 1964; Order of the Red Banner of Labour; Order of Outstanding Merit, 2000; People's Artist of Uzbekistan

Botir Zokirov (Uzbek: Ботир Карим; 26 April 1936 – 23 January 1985) was a Soviet–Uzbek singer, writer, poet, painter and actor. A People's Artist of Uzbekistan, Zokirov is considered to be the founder of Uzbek pop music.

== Early life and education ==
Batir Karimovich Zakirov was born on 26 April 1936 in Moscow, RSFSR (present-day, Russia) to singers Karim Zokirov and Shoista Saidova. Zokirov is the eldest brother of Jamshid Zokirov, an actor, Farrukh Zokirov, leader of the band Yalla, and Louisa Zakirova, a singer. Through his sister Zokirov was the uncle of American-Uzbek singer Nargiz Zakirova.

Zokirov studied at the Ostrovsky Institute (present-day, Uzbekistan State Institute of Arts and Culture).

== Career ==
In 1972, he created the first in the East and the third in Soviet Union pop troupe titled Music Hall. Together with the Russian director Mark Zakharov and an actor of Moscow Satire Theatre Aleksandr Shirvindt, Zokirov created the musical 1973rd journey of Sinbad the Sailor. Prominent singers such as Vladimir Vysotsky, Irina Ponarovskaya and bands such as Poyushchiye Gitary, Yalla (band) from various countries of USSR performed in Music Hall too.

Zokirov was one of the founders of the Uzbek Soviet Socialist Republic State Estrada Orchestra.

In 2000, Zokirov was posthumously awarded the Order of Outstanding Merit by independent Uzbekistan.

== Songs and performances ==
Zokirov gained a wide popularity due to singing in many languages including Uzbek, Russian, Arabic and French. A song "Ya Zahratan Fi Khayali" (يا زهرة في خيالي – "Flower of my imagination) by one of the most important figures of 20th Century Arab music Farid al-Atrash, performed by Zokirov at the International Festival of Youth and Students in Moscow in 1957 made him extremely popular. In the performance of Botir the song came out with the official name "Arabic Tango".

In 1966 Zokirov became the only Uzbek and one of very few Soviet singers singing at the Olympia (Paris). He performed Enrico Macias's famous song Les Filles De Mon Pays in French.

== Personal life and health ==
In 1957, Zokirov married actress Erkli Malikbaeva, with whom he had two sons Bakhtiyor Zakirov and Bakhodir Zakirov. Zokirov and Malikbaeva divorced in 1974. Zokirov's second marriage was with the ballet dancer Galina,, with whom he had a one daughter Rukhshana Zakirova.

In 1964, Zokirov spent several months in Kremlin Hospital (present-day, Moscow Central Clinical Hospital), followed by a lung surgery. Zokirov died on 23 January 1985 in Tashkent.

== Filmography ==
=== Roles in movies ===
- 1959 — Kогда цветут розы (1959) (When Roses Bloom) — as Batyr
- 1969 — Похищение (1969) (Kidnapping) — Batyrov
- 1982 — Огненные дороги (1982) (Flame Roads) — Rabindranath Tagore
- 1982 — Юность гения (1982) (Genius' Youth) — Abdullah

== Notes ==
^α Also romanised as Batir Zakirov
