= Alikadi Saidov =

Russian footballer

Personal information
- Full name: Alikadi Magomedovich Saidov
- Date of birth: 2 April 1999 (age 27)
- Place of birth: Makhachkala, Russia
- Height: 1.86 m (6 ft 1 in)
- Position: Defender

Team information
- Current team: FC Murom
- Number: 55

Youth career
- FC Anzhi Makhachkala

Senior career*
Years	Team	Apps	(Gls)
2019–2022	FC Anzhi Makhachkala	71	(3)
2017–2018	→ FC Anzhi-2 Makhachkala	7	(0)
2022–2023	FC Kaluga	19	(1)
2023–2026	FC Mashuk-KMV Pyatigorsk	71	(2)
2026–	FC Murom	26	(2)
- * Club domestic league appearances and goals as of 1 November 2026

Alikadi Magomedovich Saidov (Russian: Аликади Магомедович Саидов; born 2 April 1999) is a Russian football player who plays for FC Murom.

== Club career ==
Saidov made his debut in the Russian Professional Football League for FC Anzhi-2 Makhachkala on 19 November 2017 in a game against FC Armavir.

Saidov made his Russian Premier League debut for FC Anzhi Makhachkala on 26 May 2019 in a game against FC Ural Yekaterinburg, as a starter.

On 13 January 2021, Saidov signed a new two-year contract with Anzhi Makhachkala.
