= Timur Zakirov (footballer, born 1996) =

Russian footballer

Personal information
- Full name: Timur Timurovich Zakirov
- Date of birth: 12 April 1996 (age 30)
- Place of birth: Anapa, Russia
- Height: 1.90 m (6 ft 3 in)
- Position: Centre back

Youth career
- FC Kuban Krasnodar

Senior career*
Years	Team	Apps	(Gls)
2013–2018	FC Kuban Krasnodar	0	(0)
2016–2017	→ FC Kuban-2 Krasnodar	33	(0)
2018	FC KAMAZ Naberezhnye Chelny	8	(1)
2019	FC Kuban Krasnodar (amateur)		
2019	FC Urozhay Krasnodar	13	(2)
2020	FC Forte Taganrog (amateur)		
2020–2022	FC Forte Taganrog	31	(1)
- * Club domestic league appearances and goals as of 5 June 2022

Timur Timurovich Zakirov (Russian: Тимур Тимурович Закиров; born 12 April 1996) is a Russian football player.

== Club career ==
He made his debut in the Russian Professional Football League for FC Kuban-2 Krasnodar on 12 August 2016 in a game against FC Rotor Volgograd.

He made his debut for the main squad of FC Kuban Krasnodar on 24 August 2016 in a Russian Cup game against FC Energomash Belgorod.

== Personal life ==
His father, also named Timur Zakirov, was also a professional footballer.
