= Nargiz Zakirova =

Russian-Uzbek singer (born 1970)

Nargiz Pulatovna Zakirova
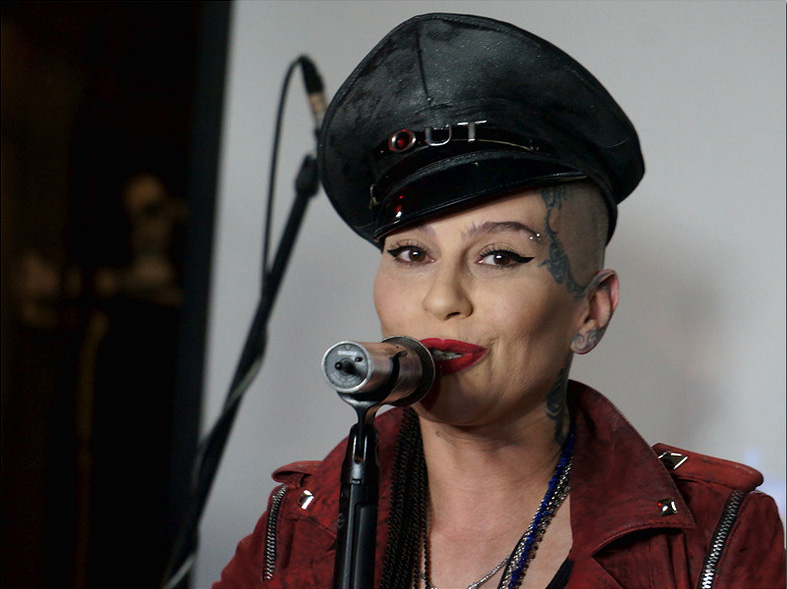
- Born: October 6, 1970 (age 56); Tashkent. Uzbek SSR, USSR
- Occupation: Singer
- Years active: 1984–present
- Musical career
- Also known as: Bella Lugozi
- Genres: Pop rock; Rock
- Labels: Nargiz Records; Sweet Rains Records; Monolit Records
- Website: Official website

Nargiz (Nargiza) Pulatovna Zakirova (Russian: Наргиз Пулатовна Закирова, Uzbek: Nargiz Po'latovna Zokirova, born 6 October 1970) is an Uzbek singer. She won the Russia's Golden Gramophone Award in three consecutive years 2015, 2016 and 2017.

== Biography ==
Nargiz was born on October 6, 1970, in Tashkent, into a well-known musical family in Uzbekistan. Mother - Louisa Karimovna Zakirova, popular in the 1960s and 70s, was a pop singer who performed, in particular, in a duet with her brother Botir Zokirov. Father Nargiz - Pulat Sionovich Mordukhaev, a Bukharian Jew, was a drummer in the ensemble, headed by Botir Zakirov. Severe illness of her father prevented Nargiz from participating in the first casting of the television program The Voice in 2012. Pulat Mordukhaev died in April 2013.

At the age of four, Nargiz first appeared on stage, at the age of 15, with the song "Remember Me" to the music of and the words of Ilya Reznik, originally recorded by her along with several other songs for the film Bride from Vuadil directed by Ali Hamroyev, appeared at the 1st All-Union TV contest of young performers of the Soviet pop song "Jurmala-86", where she won the audience award. She studied at the variety department in the republican circus school, and successfully performed with her band.

In 1995, with her parents and daughter, she emigrated from Uzbekistan to the United States. In the first years in New York, she worked in a store, in a video salon, in a tattoo parlor, and performed in restaurants. In 2001 she recorded the album "Zolotaya kletka" in folktronica style, digitally distributed by Sweet Rains Records. She sang in various groups, then performed solo.

In 2013, she passed three stages of selection for the American X-Factor, but after the organizers did not call back, she went to the Russian television project The Voice. Nargiz impressed all four judges, but she preferred the team of Leonid Agutin. On December 20, 2013, she entered the final of the contest. She was placed second, losing by a wide margin to Sergei Volchkov.

Since April 2014 Nargiz has been cooperating with the producer and composer Maxim Fadeev. The musician wrote for her the debut solo single "Ya - ne tvoya", which was released on July 3. In the music video she co-starred with her then-husband Philip Balzano.

In July 2014, Nargiz Zakirova won the Grand Prix of the International Music Festival "White Nights of St. Petersburg". In the festival, the singer took part as a representative of Russia. In November of the same year, the TV show Battle of Psychics was released with Nargiz Zakirova as a test subject.

February 6, 2015 Nargiz released her second single, entitled "Ty - moya nezhnost". The author of the composition was Maxim Fadeev.

December 15, 2015 Nargiz presented her third single entitled "Ya ne veryu tebe!". The author of the composition was also Maxim Fadeev.

May 17, 2016 was the release of the fourth single entitled "Begi".

The release of Nargiz' solo album, "Shum serdtsa", took place on October 7, 2016. It included 15 songs, including 4 previously released singles.

September 1, 2016, the premiere of the joint track Nargiz and Maxim Fadeev, entitled "Vdvoyom", was held. This song was the fifth official single in support of the debut album "Shum serdtsa".

In 2016 she divorced from her husband Philip Balzano.

In 2018 she released the single "Nelyubov". The music video featured non-actor women who described their own experiences with domestic violence.

== Personal life ==
Zakirova strongly condemned the Russian invasion of Ukraine. Her views later resulted in her being banned from visiting Russia for 50 years.

== Family ==
- Grandfather - Karim Zakirov (1912-1977), opera singer (baritone), People's Artist of the Uzbek SSR, soloist of the Uzbek State Opera and Ballet Theater named after Alisher Navoi.
- Grandmother - Shoista Saidova - singer, folk singer, soloist of the Tashkent Musical Drama and Comedy Theater named after Mukimi. Honored Artist of the Uzbek SSR (1952)
- Father - Pulat Sionovich Mordukhaev (1937-2013), musician
- Mother - Louisa Karimovna Zakirova (1938), singer, Honored Artist of the Uzbek SSR (1968)
- Uncle - Botir Zokirov, (1936-1985), Uzbek Soviet singer, writer, poet, artist and actor. The founder of variety art in the republic. People's Artist of the Uzbek SSR.
- Uncle - Farrukh Zakirov, singer, art director of the Uzbek ensemble Yalla, People's Artist of the Uzbek SSR.
- Uncle Jamshid Zakirov (1949-2012), Soviet and Uzbek theater and film actor, TV host, Honored Artist of Uzbekistan.
- Nargiz has three children from different husbands: daughter Sabina (from Ruslan Sharipov) and Leila (from Philip Balzano) and son Auel (from Ernur Kanaybekov).
  - Grandson - Noah, the son of Sabina.
  - Grandson - Levi, the son of Leila.

== Discography ==
=== Studio albums ===
Title	Information
Zolotaya kletka	Release: 17 June 2006; Label: Nargiz Records / SRR LLC/Sweet Rains Records; Format: CD, digital distribution
Alone	Release: 1 January 2011; Label: Nargiz Records / Sweet Rains Records; Format: CD, digital distribution
Shum serdtsa	Release: 7 October 2016; Label: Monolit Records; Format: CD, digital distribution

=== Singles ===
Year	Single	Album
2006	«Alla»	Zolotaya kletka
2008	«Land»	Alone
2014	"Ya - ne tvoya"	Шум сердца
2015	"Ty - moya nezhnost"	Шум сердца
2015	"Ya ne veryu tebe!"	Шум сердца
2016	«Беги»	Шум сердца
2016	"Vdvoyom" (feat. Maxim Fadeev)	Шум сердца
2016	"S lyubimimi ne rasstavaites" (feat. Maxim Fadeev)	
2017	"Ya budu vsegda s toboy	Shum serdtsa
2017	«Верните память»	
2018	"Nelyubov"	
