= Valeri Barmin =

Russian footballer and coach

Personal information
- Full name: Valeri Grigoryevich Barmin
- Date of birth: 8 May 1963 (age 63)
- Height: 1.75 m (5 ft 9 in)
- Position: Forward

Senior career*
Years	Team	Apps	(Gls)
1981	FC Urozhay Belorechensk		
1984–1989	FC Amur Blagoveshchensk	156	(16)
1991	FC Kolos Tambovka		
1996	FC Entuziast Blagoveshchensk		
2001–2002	FC Gornyak Raychikhinsk		
2003	FC Spartak Blagoveshchensk		
2004	FC Blagoveshchensk		

Managerial career
- 2013–2015: FC Biolog-Novokubansk (assistant)
- 2019: FC Anzhi Makhachkala
- 2024: FC Pobeda Khasavyurt
- * Club domestic league appearances and goals

Valeri Grigoryevich Barmin (Russian: Валерий Григорьевич Бармин; born 8 May 1963) is a Russian football coach and a former player.

== Coaching career ==
In July 2019, he was appointed manager of FC Anzhi Makhachkala, following its two-level relegation to the Russian Professional Football League.

He was dismissed by Anzhi on 28 October 2019, following a stretch of 5 games in which Anzhi gained only 1 point and team 3rd from the bottom of the table.
