= Mutaalim Magomedov =

Russian footballer

Personal information
- Full name: Mutaalim Khalilovich Magomedov
- Date of birth: 21 April 2000 (age 26)
- Height: 1.72 m (5 ft 8 in)
- Position: Midfielder

Youth career
- –2019: FC Anzhi Makhachkala

Senior career*
Years	Team	Apps	(Gls)
2019–2022	FC Anzhi Makhachkala	49	(1)
2021	→ FC SKA-Khabarovsk (loan)	9	(0)
2021	→ FC SKA-Khabarovsk-2 (loan)	4	(1)
2022	→ FC Dynamo Bryansk (loan)	12	(0)
2022–2023	FC Tver	21	(2)
2023–2024	FC Mashuk-KMV Pyatigorsk	29	(0)
2024–2026	FC Pobeda Khasavyurt	46	(5)
- * Club domestic league appearances and goals as of 13 June 2026

Mutaalim Khalilovich Magomedov (Russian: Мутаалим Халилович Магомедов; born 21 April 2000) is a Russian football player.

== Club career ==
He made his debut in the Russian Football National League for FC SKA-Khabarovsk on 17 July 2021 in a game against FC Neftekhimik Nizhnekamsk.
