= Yalla (band) =

Uzbek musical group; folk rock band

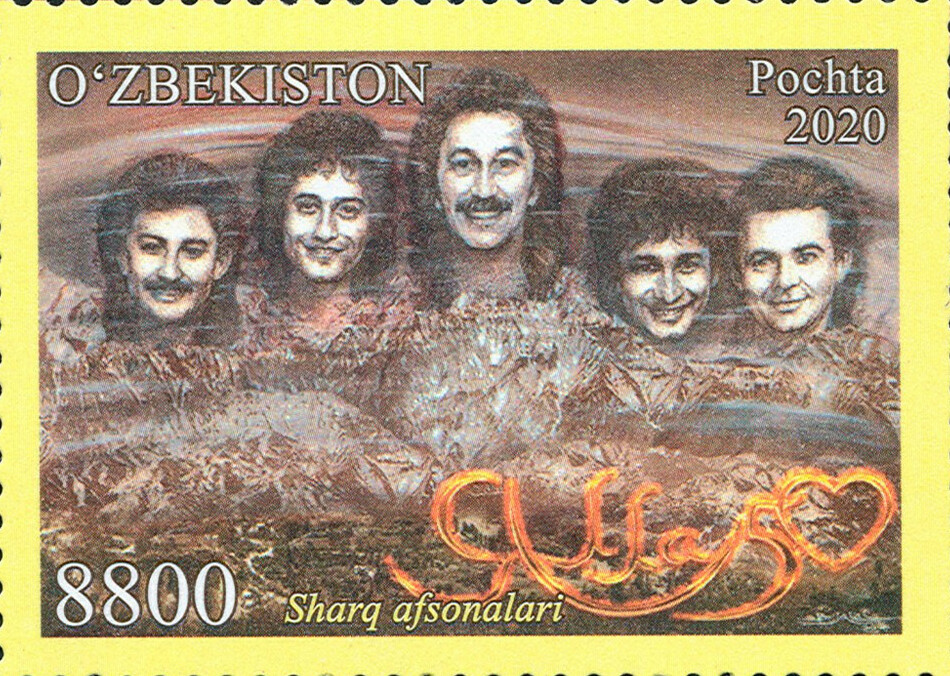
- Yalla on a 2021 stamp of Uzbekistan

Background information
- Origin: Uzbekistan
- Genre: Folk rock
- Years active: 1970–present
- Members: Farrukh Zokirov; Abbos Aliyev; Javlon Tokhtayev

Yalla (Uzbek: Ялла, Yalla) is a folk rock band from Uzbekistan. They appeared in 1970 and in the 1970s–1980s and were popular across the Soviet Union and Warsaw Pact countries. The most prominent song of Yalla was "Учкуду́к, три коло́дца" (trans. Uchkuduk, tri kalodtsa; Russian for "Uchkuduk, three water wells"), released in 1981, and one of the most popular hits in the USSR in 1980s.

The band is led by Farrukh Zokirov and directed by Igor Khalikov, with additional members including Abbos Aliyev, Javlon Tokhtayev and Timur Khalikov. The members of Yalla are graduates of the Ostrovsky Theatrical Art Institute and the Ashrafi State Conservatory in Tashkent.

== History ==
The band initially formed in 1970, with Farrukh Zokirov taking on the role of artistic director in 1976. Following this, Yalla appeared on Soviet national television as well as performing in Moscow and elsewhere in the Soviet Union, and on concert tours in Europe, Africa, Asia and Latin America, including featured appearances at the "Voice of Asia" festival.

In 2019, the group performed at the opening ceremony of the Humo Arena in Tashkent. In 2023, an event was held to commemorate the 50th anniversary of the band's formation.

== Musicians ==
Below is a list of current former musicians of Yalla.

- Eson Kandov (vocals, 1974-1977),
- Сергей Аванесов (guitar, vocals, 1977–79),
- Аббос Алиев (guitar, keyboards, vocals, bouzouki, 1979-?),
- Рушан Багиров (1970–77),
- Наргиз Байханова (vocals, 1974–83),
- Борис Гершкович (guitar, 1983)
- Баходыр Джураев (bass guitar, vocals, 1977–79),
- Батыр Закиров (vocals, 1970–77),
- Фаррух Закиров (vocals, 1972-?),
- Шамиль Закиров (keyboard, vocals, 1977–79),
- Рустам Ильясов (bass guitar, vocals, 1979–94),
- Зиёд Ишанходжаев (guitar, vocals),
- Сарвар Казиев (keyboard, vocals, 1979-?),
- Лариса Кандалова (vocals, 1970–1976),
- Шахбаз Низамутдинов (1970–77),
- Наталья Нурмухамедова (vocals, 1974-?),
- Герман Рожков (1970–77),
- Джавлон Тохтаев (guitar, vocals, 1979-?),
- Алишер Туляганов (percussion, vocals, 1979–2018),
- Юлдуз Усманова (vocals, 1991),
- Алиаскар Фатхуллин (1970–77),
- Дмитрий Цирин (drums, vocals, 1977–79),
- Евгений Ширяев (organ, vocals, 1970–79).
