= FC Inter Cherkessk =

Russian football club

- Full name: Football Club Inter Cherkessk
- Founded: 2019; 7 years ago
- Manager: Vasili Dorofeyev
- 2020–21: Russian Professional Football League, Group 1, 14th
Home colours	Away colours

FC Inter Cherkessk (Russian: ФК «Интер» Черкесск) is a Russian football team from Cherkessk. It was founded in 2019 and licensed for third-tier Russian Professional Football League for the 2019–20 season. The town was represented professionally by FC Nart Cherkessk before.

The club failed to receive a PFL license for the 2021–22 season.
