= List of Russian football transfers summer 2019 =

This is a list of Russian football transfers in the 2019 summer transfer window by club. Only clubs of the 2019–20 Russian Premier League are included.

== Russian Premier League 2019–20 ==
=== Akhmat Grozny ===
In: Note: Flags indicate national team as defined under FIFA eligibility rules; some limited exceptions apply. Players may hold more than one non-FIFA nationality.

No.	Pos.	Nation	Player
5	DF	RUS	Magomed Musalov (from Anzhi Makhachkala, previously on loan)
9	MF	POL	Konrad Michalak (from (Poland) Lechia Gdańsk)
13	MF	RUS	Roland Gigolayev (end of loan to Anzhi Makhachkala)
18	FW	VEN	Andrés Ponce (from Anzhi Makhachkala)
35	GK	RUS	Rizvan Tashayev
42	GK	RUS	Aleksandr Melikhov (from Tom Tomsk)
44	DF	RUS	Khalid Vokuyev
71	DF	RUS	Akhmad Edilbiyev
74	MF	RUS	Turpal Abzayev
87	MF	RUS	Muslim Dachayev
88	MF	RUS	Denis Glushakov (from Spartak Moscow)
89	MF	RUS	Khamzat Khazhmukhambetov
91	MF	RUS	Diamid Khintba
—	FW	RUS	Apti Akhyadov (end of loan to Chayka Peschanokopskoye, previously on loan to Anzhi Makhachkala)

Out: Note: Flags indicate national team as defined under FIFA eligibility rules; some limited exceptions apply. Players may hold more than one non-FIFA nationality.

No.	Pos.	Nation	Player
2	DF	BRA	Rodolfo (retired)
3	DF	RUS	Zaurbek Pliyev (to Dynamo Moscow)
13	DF	IRI	Milad Mohammadi (to (Belgium) Gent)
18	FW	ALB	Bekim Balaj (to (Austria) Sturm Graz)
31	GK	RUS	Aleksandr Sheplyakov (to Dynamo Moscow)
39	MF	RUS	Said-Akhmed Tsatiyev (to Orenburg)
57	GK	RUS	Rasul Umayev
64	MF	RUS	Israpil Asadov
70	FW	RUS	Timur Osmolovskiy (to CSKA Moscow)
71	FW	RUS	Adam Katsayev (to Tambov)
74	DF	RUS	Georgi Chetvergov (to Novosibirsk)
80	MF	RUS	Vladimir Khubulov (on loan to Zenit St. Petersburg)
92	DF	RUS	Kerim Magamayev (to Novosibirsk)
—	DF	RUS	Pavel Kaloshin (on loan to Torpedo Moscow, previously from Anzhi Makhachkala)
—	MF	RUS	Ayub Batsuyev (on loan to Inter Cherkessk, previously on loan to Chayka Peschanokopskoye)
—	FW	RUS	Zaur Sadayev (to (Turkey) Ankaragücü, previously on loan)
—	FW	RUS	Idris Umayev (on loan to Khimki, previously on loan to (Lithuania) Palanga)

=== Arsenal Tula ===
In: Note: Flags indicate national team as defined under FIFA eligibility rules; some limited exceptions apply. Players may hold more than one non-FIFA nationality.

No.	Pos.	Nation	Player
4	DF	GER	Robert Bauer (from (Germany) Werder Bremen)
5	DF	RUS	Aleksandr Dovbnya (from (Cyprus) Pafos)
11	MF	RUS	Sergei Tkachyov (from CSKA Moscow, previously on loan)
20	MF	SRB	Goran Čaušić (from (Serbia) Red Star Belgrade)
22	MF	RUS	Daniil Lesovoy (on loan from Zenit St. Petersburg)
25	MF	ZAM	Kings Kangwa (from (Zambia) Buildcon)
27	MF	RUS	Aleksandr Lomovitsky (on loan from Spartak Moscow)
28	MF	RUS	Vladislav Panteleyev (from Rubin Kazan)
29	MF	ZAM	Lameck Banda (from (Zambia) ZESCO United)
30	FW	ROU	Alexandru Tudorie (from (Romania) Voluntari)
32	DF	RUS	Dmitri Kuzkin (from Algoritm St. Petersburg)
33	MF	RUS	Daniil Yerofeyev (from FShM-2 Moscow)
40	MF	RUS	Artyom Mingazov (end of loan to Khimik Novomoskovsk)
41	DF	RUS	Dmitri Peshcherov
43	DF	RUS	Mikhail Ryzhov (from Khimik Novomoskovsk)
44	DF	RUS	Aleksei Ivanov (from Zenit St. Petersburg)
45	DF	RUS	Tamerlan Kuchiyev (from Khimik Novomoskovsk)
46	MF	RUS	Alan Koroyev (from Saturn-2 Ramenskoye)
48	FW	RUS	Yevgeni Lutsenko (from Dynamo Moscow)
55	DF	RUS	Nikolai Zlobin (from Saturn Ramenskoye)
60	FW	RUS	Tamerlan Musayev (from Anzhi Makhachkala)
61	DF	RUS	Anton Ivanov (from Khimik Novomoskovsk)
63	MF	RUS	Valentin Klimovskiy
67	MF	RUS	Ivan Kozlov
68	MF	RUS	Maksim Petrov
73	MF	RUS	Ansor Khabibov
78	DF	RUS	Yaroslav Garastyuk (from Dynamo St. Petersburg academy)
79	FW	RUS	Roman Izotov (from Khimik Novomoskovsk)
81	MF	RUS	Ivan Belikov (from Khimik Novomoskovsk)
87	MF	RUS	Ivan Alekseyev
88	MF	RUS	Yuri Petrovskiy
90	GK	RUS	Igor Telkov (from Khimik Novomoskovsk)
91	DF	RUS	Yegor Tuzikov
92	MF	RUS	Ivan Borsyakov
93	FW	RUS	Yegor Denisov
97	FW	RUS	Alan Mistulov (from Khimik Novomoskovsk)

Out: Note: Flags indicate national team as defined under FIFA eligibility rules; some limited exceptions apply. Players may hold more than one non-FIFA nationality.

No.	Pos.	Nation	Player
5	DF	GHA	Mohammed Kadiri (end of loan from Austria Wien)
18	FW	MNE	Luka Đorđević (end of loan from Zenit Saint Petersburg)
19	MF	RUS	Reziuan Mirzov (end of loan from Rostov)
34	DF	RUS	Aleksandr Osipov (to Veles Moscow)
44	GK	RUS	Daniil Barinov (to Nosta Novotroitsk)
45	FW	SRB	Ognjen Ožegović (end of loan from (Serbia) Partizan)
51	GK	RUS	Vitali Ushakov
55	FW	RUS	Artyom Maksimenko (to Nizhny Novgorod)
66	FW	RUS	Stanislav Krokhin
67	MF	RUS	Vladislav Tyurin (to Krylia Sovetov Samara)
69	FW	RUS	Nikita Yeryomenko (to Rodina Moscow)
73	DF	RUS	Arseni Levshuk (to Rodina Moscow)
75	MF	RUS	Igor Veprikov
76	MF	RUS	Vladimir Laptev (to Zvezda Perm)
77	MF	BUL	Mihail Aleksandrov (to (Bulgaria) Arda Kardzhali)
78	MF	RUS	Zelimkhan Bakayev (end of loan from Spartak Moscow)
79	MF	RUS	Yuri Yevdokimov
81	MF	RUS	Timur Farrakhov (to Zenit-Izhevsk)
86	DF	RUS	Timofei Prokopenko
88	DF	RUS	Ilya Klementyev (to Ural-2 Yekaterinburg)
93	MF	RUS	Denis Patsev (to Chernomorets Novorossiysk)
94	MF	RUS	Georgy Sulakvelidze (to Dynamo Moscow)
95	FW	RUS	Daniil Pavlov
99	DF	RUS	Ilya Ivanov (to Zvezda Perm)
—	MF	RUS	Danila Buranov (to Mordovia Saransk, previously on loan to Zenit St. Petersburg)

=== CSKA Moscow ===
In: Note: Flags indicate national team as defined under FIFA eligibility rules; some limited exceptions apply. Players may hold more than one non-FIFA nationality.

No.	Pos.	Nation	Player
8	MF	CRO	Nikola Vlašić (from (England) Everton, previously on loan)
11	MF	BRA	Lucas Santos (on loan from (Brazil) Vasco da Gama)
27	DF	CIV	Cédric Gogoua (from Tambov)
31	DF	CRO	Zvonimir Šarlija (on loan from (Croatia) Slaven Belupo)
45	FW	RUS	Timur Osmolovskiy (from Akhmat Grozny)
48	MF	RUS	Dmitry Kaptilovich
49	GK	RUS	Vladislav Torop
52	MF	RUS	Siyovush Khabibulloyev
72	MF	RUS	Astemir Gordyushenko (end of loan to Tyumen)
76	MF	RUS	Anton Krachkovsky
78	DF	RUS	Igor Diveyev (from Ufa, previously on loan)
90	DF	RUS	Yegor Teslenko (from Urozhay Krasnodar)
95	GK	RUS	Maksim Yedapin (end of loan to Yenisey Krasnoyarsk)

Out: Note: Flags indicate national team as defined under FIFA eligibility rules; some limited exceptions apply. Players may hold more than one non-FIFA nationality.

No.	Pos.	Nation	Player
3	DF	RUS	Nikita Chernov (to Krylia Sovetov Samara)
11	FW	URU	Abel Hernández (to (Qatar) Al Ahli)
22	GK	RUS	Georgi Kyrnats (to SKA-Khabarovsk)
33	GK	RUS	Nikolai Radchenko
47	MF	RUS	Anatoli Anisimov (to Ural Yekaterinburg)
49	DF	RUS	Ivan Zakharov (to Veles Moscow)
50	DF	BRA	Rodrigo Becão (end of loan from (Brazil) Bahia)
64	DF	RUS	Yevgeni Ignatovich (to Orenburg)
73	DF	RUS	Aleksandr Silyanov (to Lokomotiv Moscow)
81	MF	RUS	Vitali Zhironkin (on loan to Baltika Kaliningrad)
90	DF	RUS	Semyon Matviychuk (to SKA-Khabarovsk)
—	MF	RUS	Aleksandr Makarov (to Avangard Kursk, previously on loan)
—	MF	RUS	Ivan Oleynikov (to Shinnik Yaroslavl, previously on loan to Fakel Voronezh)
—	MF	RUS	Sergei Tkachyov (to Arsenal Tula, previously on loan)
—	FW	RUS	Konstantin Bazelyuk (to Mordovia Saransk, previously on loan to SKA-Khabarovsk)
—	FW	RUS	Timur Zhamaletdinov (loan to (Poland) Lech Poznań extended)

=== Dynamo Moscow ===
In: Note: Flags indicate national team as defined under FIFA eligibility rules; some limited exceptions apply. Players may hold more than one non-FIFA nationality.

No.	Pos.	Nation	Player
3	DF	RUS	Zaurbek Pliyev (from Akhmat Grozny)
5	FW	GER	Maximilian Philipp (from (Germany) Borussia Dortmund)
9	FW	CMR	Clinton N'Jie (from (France) Marseille)
10	FW	NGR	Sylvester Igboun (on loan from Ufa)
11	MF	POL	Sebastian Szymański (from (Poland) Legia Warsaw)
13	DF	RUS	Ihor Kalinin (from Rubin Kazan)
15	DF	RUS	Roman Neustädter (from (Turkey) Fenerbahçe)
17	DF	RUS	Sergei Parshivlyuk (from Rostov)
18	DF	UKR	Ivan Ordets (from (Ukraine) Shakhtar Donetsk)
35	GK	RUS	Aleksandr Sheplyakov (from Akhmat Grozny)
72	DF	RUS	Aleksandr Kutitsky
76	MF	RUS	Vladislav Karapuzov (from Lokomotiv Moscow)
77	MF	BFA	Charles Kaboré (from Krasnodar)
88	MF	SWE	Oscar Hiljemark (on loan from (Italy) Genoa)
90	FW	RUS	Nikolay Obolsky (end of loan to Sochi)
91	MF	RUS	Georgy Sulakvelidze (from Arsenal Tula)
98	GK	RUS	Ilya Kuptsov
99	FW	AZE	Ramil Sheydayev (from Krylia Sovetov Samara)

Out: Note: Flags indicate national team as defined under FIFA eligibility rules; some limited exceptions apply. Players may hold more than one non-FIFA nationality.

No.	Pos.	Nation	Player
3	DF	SWE	Sebastian Holmén (to (Netherlands) Willem II)
5	MF	GHA	Abdul Aziz Tetteh (to (Turkey) Gazişehir Gaziantep)
7	FW	RUS	Yevgeni Markov (on loan to Rubin Kazan)
10	MF	LTU	Fedor Černych (on loan to Orenburg)
11	DF	RUS	Ivan Temnikov (to Nizhny Novgorod)
12	DF	RUS	Danil Lipovoy (on loan to Orenburg)
16	GK	RUS	Ivan Zirikov (to Tekstilshchik Ivanovo)
17	MF	RUS	Anton Terekhov (on loan to Krylia Sovetov Samara)
19	MF	RUS	Vladimir Moskvichyov (on loan to Orenburg)
25	DF	RUS	Aleksei Kozlov (to Rostov)
27	MF	MLI	Samba Sow (to (England) Nottingham Forest)
48	FW	RUS	Yevgeni Lutsenko (to Arsenal Tula)
56	MF	RUS	Viktor Demyanov (to Lokomotiv Moscow)
65	DF	RUS	Ivan Yurchenko (to Znamya Truda Orekhovo-Zuyevo)
66	DF	RUS	Ilya Panin (to Lokomotiv Moscow)
93	FW	RUS	Timur Melekestsev (on loan to Urozhay Krasnodar)
98	FW	RUS	Roman Pukhov (to Fakel Voronezh)
—	DF	RUS	Maksim Nenakhov (to Rotor Volgograd, previously on loan to SKA-Khabarovsk)
—	MF	RUS	Maksim Kuzmin (to Baltika Kaliningrad, previously on loan to Fakel Voronezh)
—	MF	RUS	Aleksandr Zotov (to Yenisey Krasnoyarsk, previously on loan)

=== Krasnodar ===
In: Note: Flags indicate national team as defined under FIFA eligibility rules; some limited exceptions apply. Players may hold more than one non-FIFA nationality.

No.	Pos.	Nation	Player
7	MF	FRA	Rémy Cabella (from (France) Saint-Étienne)
19	MF	ROU	Andrei Ivan (end of loan to (Austria) Rapid Wien)
20	MF	RUS	Ilya Zhigulyov (end of loan to Ural Yekaterinburg)
21	FW	DEN	Younes Namli (from (Netherlands) PEC Zwolle)
25	DF	RUS	Ilya Khatuntsev
29	GK	RUS	Roman Safronov
31	MF	BRA	Kaio (from (Portugal) Santa Clara)
33	FW	SWE	Marcus Berg (from (United Arab Emirates) Al Ain)
41	DF	RUS	Daniil Punegov
49	MF	RUS	Alan Gioyev
50	DF	RUS	Vitali Stezhko (end of loan to (Armenia) Pyunik)
52	MF	NED	Tonny Vilhena (from (Netherlands) Feyenoord)
69	DF	RUS	Irakli Manelov
70	FW	RUS	Vladislav Samko
73	GK	RUS	Mikhail Shtepa
76	MF	RUS	Artur Samartsiyev
77	DF	RUS	Ruslan Kambolov (from Rubin Kazan)
78	DF	RUS	Denis Vlasov
94	FW	RUS	Omar Popov
96	DF	RUS	Danila Gayvoronskiy
99	MF	POR	Manuel Fernandes (from Lokomotiv Moscow)

Out: Note: Flags indicate national team as defined under FIFA eligibility rules; some limited exceptions apply. Players may hold more than one non-FIFA nationality.

No.	Pos.	Nation	Player
13	DF	RUS	Aleksei Gritsayenko (on loan to Tambov, previously on loan to Yenisey Krasnoyarsk)
19	MF	ROU	Andrei Ivan (to (Romania) Universitatea Craiova)
29	FW	RUS	Maksim Azarenko
33	MF	URU	Mauricio Pereyra (to (United States) Orlando City)
36	MF	RUS	Andrei Tekuchyov (on loan to Chayka Peschanokopskoye)
41	DF	RUS	Azamat Gayev
45	DF	RUS	Igor Paradin (on loan to (Czech Republic) Teplice)
49	DF	RUS	Roman Shishkin (to Torpedo Moscow, previously on loan to Krylia Sovetov Samara)
50	DF	RUS	Artyom Golubev (on loan to Ufa)
69	DF	RUS	Mamma Mammayev
70	GK	RUS	Yevgeni Latyshonok (to Baltika Kaliningrad)
71	FW	RUS	Roman Khodunov (to Biolog-Novokubansk)
76	FW	RUS	Ruslan Rzayev (on loan to Armavir)
77	MF	BFA	Charles Kaboré (to Dynamo Moscow)
78	DF	RUS	Danila Vedernikov (to Rostov)
80	FW	RUS	Aleksandr Butenko (on loan to Volgar Astrakhan)
91	DF	RUS	Leo Goglichidze (on loan to Chayka Peschanokopskoye, previously of loan to Nizhny Novgorod)
91	MF	RUS	Nikita Plotnikov
94	DF	RUS	Yevgeni Nazarov (on loan to (Czech Republic) Teplice)
96	MF	RUS	Vladislav Misan
—	DF	RUS	Yegor Sorokin (on loan to Rubin Kazan, previously from Rubin Kazan)
—	DF	NOR	Stefan Strandberg (released, previously on loan to Ural Yekaterinburg)
—	MF	RUS	Daniil Fomin (to Ufa, previously on loan to Nizhny Novgorod)
—	MF	RUS	Roman Kurazhov (on loan to KAMAZ Naberezhnye Chelny, previously on loan to Sokol Saratov)
—	MF	RUS	Oleg Lanin (on loan to Yenisey Krasnoyarsk, previously on loan to Khimki)

=== Krylia Sovetov Samara ===
In: Note: Flags indicate national team as defined under FIFA eligibility rules; some limited exceptions apply. Players may hold more than one non-FIFA nationality.

No.	Pos.	Nation	Player
3	DF	RUS	Nikita Chernov (from CSKA Moscow)
5	DF	RUS	Vitali Lystsov (from (Portugal) Benfica B)
6	MF	RUS	Denis Yakuba (from Rotor Volgograd)
7	FW	RUS	Aleksandr Sobolev (end of loan to Yenisey Krasnoyarsk)
8	MF	MDA	Alexandru Gațcan (from Rostov)
9	FW	CRO	Dejan Radonjić (from (Croatia) Lokomotiva)
10	MF	RUS	Anton Terekhov (on loan from Dynamo Moscow)
14	MF	MDA	Radu Gînsari (from (Israel) Hapoel Haifa)
20	MF	SRB	Srđan Mijailović
22	DF	RUS	Aleksandr Anyukov (on loan from Zenit St. Petersburg)
23	DF	RUS	Dmitri Kombarov (from Spartak Moscow)
56	DF	RUS	Aleksandr Yevinov (from Chertanovo Moscow)
57	MF	RUS	Vladislav Tyurin (from Arsenal Tula)
77	MF	RUS	Dmitri Kabutov (from SKA-Khabarovsk)
86	FW	RUS	Dmitri Molchanov (from Chertanovo Moscow)
89	MF	RUS	Danil Kamantsev (from Rubin Kazan)
91	FW	RUS	Andrei Syreskin
92	MF	RUS	Pavel Tsvetkov
93	FW	RUS	Artyom Tashchyan
94	MF	RUS	Stepan Sherstnyov (from FShM Moscow academy)
96	MF	RUS	Vyacheslav Baranov
97	GK	RUS	Pavel Shalimov

Out: Note: Flags indicate national team as defined under FIFA eligibility rules; some limited exceptions apply. Players may hold more than one non-FIFA nationality.

No.	Pos.	Nation	Player
5	DF	SLO	Miral Samardžić (to (Slovenia) Olimpija Ljubljana)
8	FW	BLR	Sergei Kornilenko (retired)
10	MF	GEO	Jano Ananidze (end of loan from Spartak Moscow)
11	FW	AZE	Ramil Sheydayev (to Dynamo Moscow)
13	MF	GHA	Mohammed Rabiu (to (France) Paris)
15	DF	RUS	Georgi Zotov (on loan to Orenburg)
17	DF	RUS	Mikhail Tikhonov (to Khimki)
18	DF	URU	Agustín Rogel (to (France) Toulouse)
19	MF	RUS	Aleksandr Samedov (retired)
22	FW	SRB	Vanja Vučićević (to (Serbia) Sinđelić Beograd)
31	MF	RUS	Denis Tkachuk (to Rotor Volgograd)
39	DF	UZB	Vitaliy Denisov (end of loan from Lokomotiv Moscow)
45	FW	RUS	Vladimir Tyavin (to Saturn Ramenskoye)
48	MF	RUS	Maksim Mukhin (to Lokomotiv Moscow)
49	DF	RUS	Roman Shishkin (end of loan from Krasnodar)
50	FW	RUS	Maksim Pogodin
55	MF	RUS	Aleksandr Bogomolov (to Orenburg)
58	DF	RUS	Vladislav Shchetinin
62	DF	RUS	Nikita Verkhunov (to Akron Tolyatti)
82	DF	RUS	Daniil Matveyev (to Khimki-M)
83	MF	RUS	Nikita Stroyev
84	FW	RUS	Pavel Zuyev
85	MF	RUS	Yegor Novikov (to Ararat Moscow)
86	FW	RUS	Bogdan Chinaryov
91	FW	RUS	Pavel Yakovlev (to Fakel Voronezh)
94	MF	RUS	Viktor Gryazin (to Sochi)
—	GK	RUS	Vitali Shilnikov (to Nizhny Novgorod, previously on loan to Syzran-2003)
—	DF	RUS	Ali Gadzhibekov (on loan to Nizhny Novgorod, previously on loan to Yenisey Krasnoyarsk)
—	FW	RUS	Ilya Viznovich (to Shinnik Yaroslavl, previously on loan to Luch Vladivostok)

=== Lokomotiv Moscow ===
In: Note: Flags indicate national team as defined under FIFA eligibility rules; some limited exceptions apply. Players may hold more than one non-FIFA nationality.

No.	Pos.	Nation	Player
2	DF	RUS	Dmitri Zhivoglyadov (from Ufa)
7	MF	POL	Grzegorz Krychowiak (from (France) Paris Saint-Germain, previously on loan)
22	FW	MNE	Luka Đorđević (from Zenit St. Petersburg)
23	MF	POR	João Mário (on loan from (Italy) Inter Milan)
27	DF	BRA	Murilo (from (Brazil) Cruzeiro)
39	MF	RUS	Ilya Gritsak (from Zenit St. Petersburg)
45	DF	RUS	Aleksandr Silyanov (from CSKA Moscow)
46	MF	RUS	Ivan Kotelnikov
47	DF	RUS	Ivan Shmakov
52	GK	RUS	Aleksandr Koryakin
53	DF	RUS	Ilya Panin (from Dynamo Moscow)
54	MF	RUS	Viktor Demyanov (from Dynamo Moscow)
61	MF	RUS	Vadim Karev
62	FW	RUS	Ivan Bezrukov (from UOR-5 Yegoryevsk)
64	MF	RUS	Maksim Matveyev
65	GK	RUS	Aleksandr Kasyanenko
66	DF	RUS	Mikhail Ivankov
75	MF	RUS	Sergei Babkin (from Anzhi Makhachkala)
76	MF	RUS	Maksim Mukhin (from Krylia Sovetov Samara)
79	DF	RUS	Aleksandr Mukhin
81	FW	RUS	Nikita Khlynov
86	MF	RUS	Timofey Baraboshkin (from UOR-5 Yegoryevsk)
96	FW	RUS	Denis Chepelev
97	DF	RUS	Nikita Dronov (from UOR-5 Yegoryevsk)

Out: Note: Flags indicate national team as defined under FIFA eligibility rules; some limited exceptions apply. Players may hold more than one non-FIFA nationality.

No.	Pos.	Nation	Player
4	MF	POR	Manuel Fernandes (to Krasnodar)
17	DF	UKR	Taras Mykhalyk (to (Ukraine) Volyn Lutsk)
20	MF	RUS	Ivan Sharov (to Saturn Ramenskoye)
21	FW	GEO	Khvicha Kvaratskhelia (end of loan from (Georgia (country)) Rustavi)
23	MF	RUS	Dmitri Tarasov
27	MF	RUS	Igor Denisov (retired)
35	DF	RUS	Roman Kvataniya (to Sochi)
39	DF	RUS	Pavel Khodeyev
40	MF	RUS	Nikita Glushkov (to Chayka Peschanokopskoye)
42	DF	RUS	Ivan Lapshov (to Orenburg)
45	MF	RUS	Stanislav Utkin (to Leningradets Leningrad Oblast)
46	DF	RUS	Aleksandr Vulfov (to Dolgoprudny)
47	FW	RUS	Aleksandr Dolgov (to Rostov)
52	GK	RUS	Mikhail Mzhelsky (to (Kyrgyzstan) Alay)
53	DF	RUS	Albert Gilmanshin (to Ufa)
54	GK	RUS	Vitali Sychyov (to Tambov)
55	FW	RUS	Sergei Bely
57	MF	RUS	Kirill Shchetinin (to Zenit St. Petersburg)
61	FW	RUS	Islam Vagabov
62	DF	RUS	Vadim Loginov (to Strogino Moscow)
64	DF	RUS	Valentin Vinnichenko (to SKA Rostov-on-Don)
65	MF	RUS	Vladislav Ignatenko (to Nosta Novotroitsk)
66	GK	RUS	Timur Kraykov (end of loan from Sokol Saratov)
71	DF	RUS	Nikolai Poyarkov (to Rostov)
75	DF	RUS	Ilya Golosov (to Spartak Moscow)
76	MF	RUS	Vladislav Karapuzov (to Dynamo Moscow)
79	FW	RUS	Maksim Chikanchi (to Dolgoprudny)
80	FW	RUS	Zagir Gereykhanov
81	DF	RUS	Kamil Salakhetdinov (to Tambov)
88	MF	RUS	Mikhail Kazimir (to Lada-Tolyatti)
97	FW	RUS	Gevork Sarkisyan
—	DF	UZB	Vitaliy Denisov (to Rubin Kazan, previously on loan to Krylia Sovetov Samara)
—	MF	RUS	Alan Kasaev (to Avangard Kursk, previously on loan to Sochi)
—	FW	RUS	Arshak Koryan (to Khimki, previously on loan)
—	FW	RUS	Igor Portnyagin (to Nizhny Novgorod, previously on loan to Baltika Kaliningrad)

=== Orenburg ===
In: Note: Flags indicate national team as defined under FIFA eligibility rules; some limited exceptions apply. Players may hold more than one non-FIFA nationality.

No.	Pos.	Nation	Player
4	DF	SRB	Uroš Radaković (on loan from (Czech Republic) Sparta Prague)
5	MF	RUS	Timur Ayupov (from Nizhny Novgorod)
6	DF	ISR	Adi Gotlieb (from (Israel) Hapoel Tel Aviv)
7	MF	SWE	Filip Rogić (from (Sweden) Örebro)
15	DF	RUS	Georgi Zotov (on loan from Krylia Sovetov Samara)
17	MF	SLO	Žiga Škoflek (from (Slovenia) Rudar Velenje)
18	DF	RUS	Danil Lipovoy (on loan from Dynamo Moscow)
19	MF	RUS	Vladimir Moskvichyov (on loan from Dynamo Moscow)
20	FW	GHA	Joel Fameyeh (from (Ghana) Wa All Stars)
22	MF	LTU	Fedor Černych (on loan from Dynamo Moscow)
38	GK	BLR	Andrey Klimovich (from (Belarus) Shakhtyor Soligorsk)
42	DF	RUS	Ivan Lapshov (from Lokomotiv Moscow)
46	FW	RUS	Rim Yegofarov
48	MF	RUS	Danila Shilov
62	DF	RUS	Andrei Filippov
63	GK	RUS	Mikhail Pavlov
73	GK	RUS	Platon Zakharchuk
74	FW	RUS	Dmitri Palaguta
81	MF	RUS	Anton Glukharyov (from Nosta Novotroitsk)
82	DF	RUS	Vlad Palazhnov
92	MF	RUS	Ilya Anisimov
93	DF	RUS	Yevgeni Ignatovich (from CSKA Moscow)
94	FW	RUS	Vasili Yatskov (from Almaz-Antey St. Petersburg)
95	MF	RUS	Georgi Vilochkov
96	MF	RUS	Aleksandr Bogomolov (from Krylia Sovetov Samara)
97	MF	RUS	Said-Akhmed Tsatiyev (from Akhmat Grozny)
98	GK	RUS	Pavel Fedotov

Out: Note: Flags indicate national team as defined under FIFA eligibility rules; some limited exceptions apply. Players may hold more than one non-FIFA nationality.

No.	Pos.	Nation	Player
6	DF	CRO	Silvije Begić (to Rubin Kazan)
9	FW	RUS	Andrei Kozlov (to Ufa)
10	MF	SLO	Denis Popović (to (Switzerland) Zürich)
15	DF	RUS	Dmitri Andreyev (retired)
19	MF	RUS	Aleksei Sutormin (to Rubin Kazan)
23	MF	RUS	Sergei Breyev (to Avangard Kursk)
42	DF	RUS	Valentin Prilepin (to Zorky Krasnogorsk)
46	MF	RUS	Artyom Apalkin (to Nosta Novotroitsk)
48	MF	RUS	Roman Lobov (to Lada-Tolyatti)
54	DF	RUS	Yuri Popov
58	DF	RUS	Adessoye Oyewole (to Tambov)
59	MF	RUS	Ilya Anokhin
62	MF	RUS	Vladislav Kalinin
63	GK	RUS	Ilya Uchkin
69	FW	RUS	Aleksandr Matveychuk
70	DF	RUS	Tamaz Makhatadze
72	FW	RUS	Ivan Zinaliyev
74	DF	RUS	Daniyar Duysengazin
81	MF	RUS	Lev Belousov (to Khimki-M)
82	MF	RUS	Vildan Amerkhanov
84	MF	RUS	Aleksandr Belousov
86	MF	RUS	Grigori Chirkin (to Avangard Kursk)
90	GK	RUS	Aleksei Kenyaykin (on loan to Torpedo Moscow)
91	GK	RUS	Yevgeny Frolov (to Sochi)
92	MF	RUS	Denis Fedenko (to Nosta Novotroitsk)
93	FW	RUS	Mikhail Kukushkin
94	DF	RUS	Sergei Kovalev

=== Rostov ===
In: Note: Flags indicate national team as defined under FIFA eligibility rules; some limited exceptions apply. Players may hold more than one non-FIFA nationality.

No.	Pos.	Nation	Player
1	GK	RUS	Yegor Baburin (from Zenit St. Petersburg)
4	DF	RUS	Danila Vedernikov (from Krasnodar)
13	FW	RUS	Danila Proshlyakov (from Spartak Moscow)
19	MF	RUS	Khoren Bayramyan (end of loan to Rubin Kazan)
20	MF	BLR	Vladimir Medved (from (Belarus) Slutsk)
22	DF	RUS	Kirill Malyarov (from Rotor Volgograd)
26	MF	RUS	Aleksandr Saplinov (from Baltika Kaliningrad)
34	DF	RUS	Aleksei Kozlov (from Dynamo Moscow)
47	FW	RUS	Aleksandr Dolgov (from Lokomotiv Moscow)
58	FW	RUS	Tamaz Topuria (own youth)
59	MF	RUS	Aleksandr Vodyanik (own youth)
64	DF	RUS	Danil Potapov (own youth)
67	MF	RUS	Bogdan Mikhaylichenko
72	FW	RUS	Vladimir Abramov (own youth)
74	MF	RUS	Nikita Kupriyanov (own youth)
75	FW	RUS	Danil Khromov (own youth)
78	DF	RUS	Dmitri Chistyakov (from Tambov)
86	GK	RUS	Stepan Bardizh
89	FW	RUS	Vadim Zhikhartsev (own youth)
90	FW	RUS	Aleksandr Voronin (own youth)
91	DF	RUS	Ruslan Bezrukov (from Novoshakhtinsk-2-Sokol Novoshakhtinsk)
93	FW	RUS	Kristian Verbitsky (own youth)
95	DF	RUS	Kirill Romanov (own youth)
96	DF	RUS	Aleksandr Gapechkin (own youth)
98	DF	RUS	Sergey Kochkanyan

Out: Note: Flags indicate national team as defined under FIFA eligibility rules; some limited exceptions apply. Players may hold more than one non-FIFA nationality.

No.	Pos.	Nation	Player
2	MF	BLR	Timofei Kalachev (retired)
4	DF	RUS	Sergei Parshivlyuk (to Dynamo Moscow)
23	MF	RUS	Aleksandr Zuyev (on loan to Rubin Kazan)
24	DF	SLO	Miha Mevlja (end of loan from Zenit St. Petersburg)
31	GK	RUS	Ilya Abayev (to Chertanovo Moscow)
33	DF	RUS	Konstantin Pliyev (on loan to Rubin Kazan)
47	MF	RUS	Denis Karnuta
48	GK	RUS	Sergei Aydarov (to Rodina Moscow)
67	MF	RUS	Vadim Lazarev (to Chayka Peschanokopskoye)
74	MF	RUS	Norik Mkrtchyan (to (Armenia) Alashkert-2)
75	DF	RUS	Dmitri Meshkov
78	DF	RUS	Roman S. Petrov
80	DF	RUS	Ivan Novoseltsev (end of loan from Zenit St. Petersburg)
83	FW	RUS	Roman O. Petrov
84	MF	MDA	Alexandru Gațcan (to Krylia Sovetov Samara)
87	DF	RUS	Maksim Sukhomlinov (to Akron Tolyatti)
90	MF	RUS	Ivan Danilov
92	MF	RUS	Artyom Shchadin (to (Belarus) Torpedo-BelAZ Zhodino)
93	FW	RUS	Igor Volkov (to Chernomorets Novorossiysk)
—	DF	SLO	Matija Boben (to (Italy) Livorno, previously on loan)
—	DF	RUS	Nikolai Poyarkov (on loan to Rubin Kazan, from Lokomotiv Moscow)
—	MF	IRI	Saeid Ezatolahi (on loan to (Belgium) Eupen, previously on loan to (England) Reading)
—	MF	RUS	Nikita Kryukov (to Zenit-Izhevsk, previously on loan)
—	MF	RUS	Reziuan Mirzov (to Spartak Moscow, previously on loan to Arsenal Tula)
—	MF	RUS	Maksim Skrynnik (to SKA Rostov-on-Don, previously on loan)
—	MF	RUS	Aleksandr Troshechkin (to Khimki, previously on loan to Avangard Kursk)
—	MF	RUS	Sergei Zabrodin (to Ararat Moscow, previously on loan to SKA Rostov-on-Don)
—	FW	ISL	Viðar Örn Kjartansson (on loan to Rubin Kazan, previously on loan to (Sweden) Hammarby)
—	FW	RUS	Dmitri Solovyov (to Veles Moscow, previously on loan)

=== Rubin Kazan ===
In: Note: Flags indicate national team as defined under FIFA eligibility rules; some limited exceptions apply. Players may hold more than one non-FIFA nationality.

No.	Pos.	Nation	Player
2	DF	SWE	Carl Starfelt (from (Sweden) IFK Göteborg)
3	DF	RUS	Konstantin Pliyev (on loan from Rostov)
4	DF	CRO	Silvije Begić (from Orenburg)
8	FW	ISL	Viðar Örn Kjartansson (on loan from Rostov)
11	MF	GEO	Zuriko Davitashvili (from (Georgia (country)) Locomotive Tbilisi)
12	MF	RUS	Aleksandr Zuyev (on loan from Rostov)
20	FW	RUS	Yevgeni Markov (on loan from Dynamo Moscow)
21	MF	GEO	Khvicha Kvaratskhelia (from (Georgia (country)) Rustavi)
22	GK	RUS	Yury Dyupin (from Anzhi Makhachkala)
26	FW	GEO	Beka Mikeltadze (from (Cyprus) Anorthosis Famagusta)
29	DF	UZB	Vitaliy Denisov (from Lokomotiv Moscow)
33	DF	UKR	Oleh Danchenko (from (Ukraine) Shakhtar Donetsk)
48	FW	RUS	Dzhosi Dzaurov
52	MF	RUS	Denis Fedorochev (from Dynamo Stavropol, previously to Dynamo Stavropol)
53	FW	RUS	Roman Pirmamedov
54	MF	RUS	Denis Sabusov
57	FW	RUS	Mishel Pukhayev (from Spartak Vladikavkaz)
64	GK	RUS	Arseni Vertkov
70	MF	RUS	Nikolai Kipiani (from (Georgia (country)) Rustavi)
71	DF	RUS	Nikolai Poyarkov (on loan from Rostov)
71	FW	RUS	Daniil Arsentyev
74	MF	RUS	Sergei Chernenko
80	DF	RUS	Yegor Sorokin (on loan from Krasnodar, previously to Krasnodar)
88	MF	RUS	Aleksandr Tashayev (on loan from Spartak Moscow)
93	GK	RUS	Aleksei Gorodovoy (end of loan to Zenit St. Petersburg)
94	MF	RUS	Konstantin Vakhtyorov
95	MF	RUS	Aleks Radzhabov
97	MF	RUS	Aleksandr Shubin
98	MF	RUS	Artur Koloskov (from Sochi)
99	MF	RUS	Kamil Zakirov (from Anzhi Makhachkala)

Out: Note: Flags indicate national team as defined under FIFA eligibility rules; some limited exceptions apply. Players may hold more than one non-FIFA nationality.

No.	Pos.	Nation	Player
3	DF	RUS	Ibragim Tsallagov (end of loan from Zenit St. Petersburg)
8	MF	RUS	Vladislav Panteleyev (to Arsenal Tula)
9	FW	RUS	Artur Sagitov (on loan to Nizhny Novgorod)
10	FW	RUS	Dmitry Poloz (end of loan from Zenit St. Petersburg)
11	FW	RUS	Aleksandr Bukharov
12	DF	RUS	Ihor Kalinin (to Dynamo Moscow)
19	MF	RUS	Khoren Bayramyan (end of loan from Rostov)
21	GK	RUS	Yegor Baburin (end of loan from Zenit St. Petersburg)
38	GK	RUS	Yegor Tushev
41	DF	RUS	Vladislav Mikushin (on loan to Fakel Voronezh)
46	MF	RUS	Aydar Karimov
50	DF	RUS	Rail Abdullin (on loan to Neftekhimik Nizhnekamsk)
57	DF	RUS	Pavel Korkin (to Sochi)
60	DF	RUS	Amir Nurullin (to (Germany) FV Ravensburg)
70	MF	RUS	Georgi Bazayev (to Spartak Vladikavkaz)
73	MF	RUS	Igor Nikolov (on loan to Novosibirsk)
75	MF	RUS	Daniil Rybakov (to Zenit-Izhevsk)
77	MF	IRI	Reza Shekari (to (Iran) Tractor)
79	GK	RUS	Edgar Rakhmatullin
87	MF	RUS	Yuri Zheleznov (to Zenit St. Petersburg academy)
88	DF	RUS	Ruslan Kambolov (to Krasnodar)
89	MF	RUS	Mikhail Yakovlev (on loan to KAMAZ Naberezhnye Chelny)
90	MF	RUS	Danil Kamantsev (to Krylia Sovetov Samara)
91	DF	RUS	Vitali Ustinov (to (Kazakhstan) Atyrau)
94	FW	RUS	Artur Rashitov
95	MF	RUS	Anton Adarichev
97	MF	RUS	Adil Mukhametzyanov (to Tekstilshchik Ivanovo)
98	GK	RUS	Anton Chernov (to Luki-Energiya Velikiye Luki)
—	GK	RUS	Timur Akmurzin (to Spartak Moscow, previously on loan to Ufa)
—	MF	RUS	Aleksei Sutormin (to Zenit St. Petersburg, previously from Orenburg)

=== Sochi ===
In: Note: Flags indicate national team as defined under FIFA eligibility rules; some limited exceptions apply. Players may hold more than one non-FIFA nationality.

No.	Pos.	Nation	Player
8	MF	RUS	Nikita Koldunov (from Zenit St. Petersburg)
9	FW	RUS	Anton Zabolotny (from Zenit St. Petersburg)
13	DF	RUS	Fyodor Kudryashov (from (Turkey) İstanbul Başakşehir)
15	DF	RUS	Ibragim Tsallagov (from Zenit St. Petersburg)
16	MF	ECU	Christian Noboa (from Zenit St. Petersburg)
17	MF	RUS	Andrei Mostovoy (on loan from Zenit St. Petersburg)
19	GK	RUS	Yevgeny Frolov (from Orenburg)
24	DF	RUS	Elmir Nabiullin (from Zenit St. Petersburg)
25	DF	RUS	Ivan Novoseltsev (from Zenit St. Petersburg)
32	DF	SLO	Miha Mevlja (from Zenit St. Petersburg)
35	GK	RUS	Soslan Dzhanayev (from (Poland) Miedź Legnica)
41	GK	RUS	Sergey Samok (from CSKA Moscow academy)
43	DF	RUS	Sergei Mikhaylov (from Anzhi Makhachkala)
46	DF	UKR	Nikita Teplyakov
47	DF	RUS	Roman Kvataniya (from Lokomotiv Moscow)
48	DF	RUS	Semyon Surinovich
49	DF	RUS	Pavel Korkin (from Rubin Kazan)
51	GK	RUS	Igor Ivanov
52	DF	RUS	Vadim Ivlev
53	DF	RUS	Sergei Voropayev
54	MF	RUS	Anatoli Nemchenko (from Urozhay Krasnodar)
56	DF	RUS	Vadim Milyutin
57	MF	RUS	Viktor Gryazin (from Krylia Sovetov Samara)
58	MF	RUS	Andrei Bokovoy
59	MF	RUS	Nikita Molochnikov
63	MF	RUS	Daniyar Bikmukhamedov
64	MF	RUS	Maksim Kolmakov
67	MF	RUS	Vikentiy Shchipachyov
68	MF	RUS	Stepan Batyutin
69	MF	RUS	Luchano Bobrov (from Khimki-M)
71	GK	RUS	Yegor Kabakov
72	MF	RUS	Ilya Gorbashov
73	MF	RUS	Yegor Prutsev
74	FW	RUS	Vladislav Makeyev
76	FW	RUS	Ilya Predeus
77	FW	RUS	Dmitry Poloz (from Zenit St. Petersburg)
78	MF	RUS	Beka Dzhanelidze (from Zenit St. Petersburg)
79	MF	RUS	Timofey Kostenko
87	FW	ARM	Aleksandre Karapetian (from (Luxembourg) Progrès Niederkorn)
90	DF	RUS	Pavel Shakuro (from Tyumen)

Out: Note: Flags indicate national team as defined under FIFA eligibility rules; some limited exceptions apply. Players may hold more than one non-FIFA nationality.

No.	Pos.	Nation	Player
3	MF	RUS	Alan Kasaev (end of loan from Lokomotiv Moscow)
7	MF	RUS	Yevgeni Pesegov (to Rotor Volgograd)
8	MF	RUS	Nikita Salamatov (to Luch Vladivostok)
11	MF	RUS	Igor Gorbunov (to Rotor Volgograd)
11	FW	RUS	Vladimir Obukhov (to Tambov, previously from Mordovia Saransk)
13	GK	RUS	Rostislav Soldatenko (on loan to Alania Vladikavkaz)
14	MF	RUS	Roman Kosyanchuk (to Fakel Voronezh)
22	DF	RUS	Arkadi Kalaydzhyan (to (Armenia) Ararat Yerevan)
25	DF	RUS	Andrei Bychkov (to Chayka Peschanokopskoye)
27	DF	RUS	Kirill Zaika
29	FW	NGR	Steven Alfred (to (Armenia) Pyunik)
36	MF	RUS	Yegor Remizov
38	MF	RUS	Andrei Rybachuk
42	DF	RUS	Roman Ponomarenko (joined in July, left on 26 September)
43	DF	RUS	Maks Dziov (joined in July, left on 1 August to Spartak Vladikavkaz)
51	GK	RUS	Maksim Semyonov (joined in July, left on 1 August)
55	MF	RUS	Yan Kazayev (to Baltika Kaliningrad)
58	MF	RUS	Artur Koloskov (joined in July, left on 1 August to Rubin Kazan)
62	MF	RUS	Aleksei Logvinov (joined in July, left on 26 September)
66	DF	RUS	Vladislav Ivashchenko
91	GK	RUS	Andrei Zaytsev (to Chernomorets Novorossiysk)
92	DF	RUS	Valeri Pochivalin (to Khimki)
96	MF	RUS	Rodion Zhevtyak
99	FW	RUS	Nikolay Obolsky (end of loan from Dynamo Moscow)

=== Spartak Moscow ===
In: Note: Flags indicate national team as defined under FIFA eligibility rules; some limited exceptions apply. Players may hold more than one non-FIFA nationality.

No.	Pos.	Nation	Player
8	MF	NED	Guus Til (from (Netherlands) AZ Alkmaar)
9	MF	RUS	Reziuan Mirzov (from Rostov)
10	MF	RUS	Zelimkhan Bakayev (end of loan to Arsenal Tula)
13	FW	GEO	Nikoloz Kutateladze
19	FW	ARG	Ezequiel Ponce (from (Italy) Roma)
20	MF	GER	André Schürrle (on loan from (Germany) Borussia Dortmund)
21	DF	GER	Malcolm Badu (from (Germany) Wolfsburg II)
23	FW	SWE	Jordan Larsson (from (Sweden) Norrköping)
27	GK	RUS	Timur Akmurzin (from Rubin Kazan)
30	GK	ITA	Andrea Romagnoli (from (Italy) Roma)
33	MF	CZE	Alex Král (from (Czech Republic) Slavia Prague)
36	DF	RUS	Artyom Voropayev (from Lada-Tolyatti, previously on loan)
45	FW	POR	Idrisa Sambú (end of loan to (Belgium) Mouscron)
49	MF	GEO	Jano Ananidze (end of loan to Krylia Sovetov Samara)
51	MF	RUS	Nikita Miroshnichenko (from Zenit St. Petersburg)
52	DF	RUS	Albert Khabirov
61	DF	RUS	Ilya Golosov (from Lokomotiv Moscow)
81	DF	RUS	Vladislav Saumov
82	MF	RUS	Ilya Levchenkov
89	FW	RUS	Ilya Golyatov
97	MF	RUS	Daniil Denisov

Out: Note: Flags indicate national team as defined under FIFA eligibility rules; some limited exceptions apply. Players may hold more than one non-FIFA nationality.

No.	Pos.	Nation	Player
4	MF	RUS	Nikolai Tyunin
8	MF	RUS	Denis Glushakov (to Akhmat Grozny)
11	MF	BRA	Fernando (to (China) Beijing Sinobo Guoan)
12	FW	BRA	Luiz Adriano (to (Brazil) Palmeiras)
13	MF	RUS	Yegor Rudkovsky (to Chertanovo Moscow)
16	DF	ITA	Salvatore Bocchetti (to (Italy) Verona)
23	DF	RUS	Dmitri Kombarov (to Krylia Sovetov Samara)
23	MF	RUS	Aleksandr Lomovitsky (on loan to Arsenal Tula)
30	GK	RUS	Danila Yermakov (to Fakel Voronezh)
34	DF	RUS	Turgay Mokhbaliyev (to Ufa)
37	MF	RUS	Georgi Melkadze (on loan to Tambov)
46	DF	RUS	Artyom Mamin (to Ural Yekaterinburg)
61	FW	RUS	Danila Proshlyakov (to Rostov)
81	FW	RUS	Daniil Lopatin (to Rodina Moscow)
82	MF	RUS	Ilya Mazurov (to Fakel Voronezh)
88	MF	RUS	Aleksandr Tashayev (on loan to Rubin Kazan)
90	MF	RUS	Kirill Folmer (to Ufa)
94	MF	ALG	Sofiane Hanni (to (Qatar) Al-Gharafa)
95	GK	RUS	Vladislav Teryoshkin
97	MF	RUS	Danil Poluboyarinov (to (Belarus) Energetik-BGU Minsk)

=== Tambov ===
In: Note: Flags indicate national team as defined under FIFA eligibility rules; some limited exceptions apply. Players may hold more than one non-FIFA nationality.

No.	Pos.	Nation	Player
1	GK	RUS	Tamerlan Gabuyev
3	DF	RUS	Guram Tetrashvili (from (Belarus) Gomel)
6	MF	RUS	Vladislav Kulik (from Anzhi Makhachkala)
13	FW	RUS	Vladimir Obukhov (from Sochi)
15	MF	NGR	Mohammed Usman (from (Armenia) Pyunik)
19	MF	RUS	Georgi Melkadze (on loan from Spartak Moscow)
21	MF	RUS	Arsen Kabolov
24	MF	NGR	Anvon Lawrence
25	MF	RUS	Pavel Karasyov (from Anzhi Makhachkala)
27	DF	RUS	Aleksei Gritsayenko (on loan from Krasnodar)
30	DF	RUS	Soslan Takazov (from Armavir)
31	DF	RUS	Kirill Bolshakov
33	MF	RUS	Yevgeni Morev (from Yenisey Krasnoyarsk)
35	GK	RUS	Vitali Sychyov (from Lokomotiv Moscow)
36	MF	RUS	Denis Skrypnikov
44	MF	RUS	Denis Lenyo (end of loan to Zorky Krasnogorsk)
45	GK	RUS	Nikita Kotov
47	DF	RUS	Kamil Salakhetdinov (from Lokomotiv Moscow)
48	FW	RUS	Andrei Chasovskikh (end of loan to Luch Vladivostok)
50	GK	RUS	Vladimir Sugrobov (from Baltika Kaliningrad)
51	FW	RUS	Roman Zherebyatyev
55	DF	RUS	Maksim Osipenko (from Fakel Voronezh)
56	MF	RUS	Vildan Yermilov
58	DF	RUS	Adessoye Oyewole (from Orenburg)
59	MF	RUS	Aleksandr Shurlov (from Akhlamov-UOR Neklinovsky District)
69	DF	RUS	Ilya Mamkin
70	MF	GHA	Sulley Muniru (from (Belarus) Dinamo Minsk)
71	DF	RUS	Renat Bagdashkin
74	MF	RUS	Anton Arkhipov (end of loan to Zorky Krasnogorsk)
77	MF	RUS	Mikhail Kostyukov (from Yenisey Krasnoyarsk)
79	MF	RUS	Igor Sichkar (from Orbita-Yunior Dzerzhinsky)
80	DF	RUS	Yegor Badyin (from Ural Yekaterinburg)
81	MF	RUS	Vladimir Kabakhidze
90	MF	RUS	Dmitri Merenchukov (from Novokuznetsk)
95	MF	RUS	Adam Katsayev (from Akhmat Grozny)
97	MF	RUS	Merab Chikhradze (from Armavir)
—	FW	RUS	Ishkhan Geloyan (from Shinnik Yaroslavl)

Out: Note: Flags indicate national team as defined under FIFA eligibility rules; some limited exceptions apply. Players may hold more than one non-FIFA nationality.

No.	Pos.	Nation	Player
4	DF	RUS	Yevgeny Ovsiyenko (to Baltika Kaliningrad)
5	DF	RUS	Yevgeni Shlyakov (on loan to SKA-Khabarovsk)
6	MF	CIV	Sékou Doumbia (to Armavir)
10	FW	RUS	Vladimir Obukhov (end of loan from Mordovia Saransk)
13	DF	RUS	Sergei Zuykov (end of loan from Zenit St. Petersburg)
17	MF	RUS	Ilnur Alshin (to Baltika Kaliningrad)
18	MF	MNE	Mladen Kašćelan (to Baltika Kaliningrad)
19	FW	CIV	Mohamed Konaté (to Khimki, previously from (Armenia) Pyunik)
21	GK	RUS	Denis Vavilin (to Tom Tomsk)
22	MF	UZB	Vagiz Galiulin (on loan to Neftekhimik Nizhnekamsk)
24	MF	RUS	Vladislav Boldyrev
25	DF	RUS	Mikhail Mishchenko (to (Belarus) Torpedo-BelAZ Zhodino)
27	DF	CIV	Cédric Gogoua (to CSKA Moscow, previously from (Latvia) BFC Daugavpils)
29	DF	RUS	Aleksandr Gorbatyuk (to Tom Tomsk)
33	DF	RUS	Andrei Yakovlev
49	MF	RUS	Daniil Mishutin
50	MF	RUS	Roman Strelnikov
52	MF	RUS	Mikhail Usanin
70	MF	RUS	Andrei Murnin (to Khimki)
77	MF	RUS	Yevgeni Kuleshov (to Kolomna)
78	DF	RUS	Dmitri Chistyakov (to Rostov)
91	MF	RUS	Maksim Lazutkin
94	FW	RUS	Yevgeni Ragulkin (on loan to Tyumen)
99	MF	RUS	Ivan Markelov (released, previously from Anzhi Makhachkala)
—	GK	RUS	Oleg Smirnov (to Mordovia Saransk, previously on loan to Tom Tomsk)
—	GK	RUS	Dmitri Vyalov (to Zenit-Izhevsk, previously on loan to Syzran-2003)
—	DF	RUS	Konstantin Garbuz (to Yenisey Krasnoyarsk, previously on loan to SKA-Khabarovsk)
—	MF	RUS	Ivan Sergeyev (to Torpedo Moscow, previously on loan)
—	MF	RUS	Svyatoslav Shabanov (to Chita, previously on loan to Zorky Krasnogorsk)
—	MF	UKR	Serhiy Shevchuk (released, previously on loan to (Armenia) Pyunik)
—	FW	RUS	Artyom Arkhipov (on loan to (Belarus) Gorodeya, previously on loan to Zorky Krasnogorsk)
—	FW	RUS	Sergei Arkhipov (on loan to Metallurg Lipetsk, previously on loan to Zorky Krasnogorsk)
—	FW	RUS	Aleksei Bayev (to Veles Moscow, previously on loan to Ryazan)

=== Ufa ===
In: Note: Flags indicate national team as defined under FIFA eligibility rules; some limited exceptions apply. Players may hold more than one non-FIFA nationality.

No.	Pos.	Nation	Player
2	DF	RUS	Danil Krugovoy (on loan from Zenit St. Petersburg, previously to Zenit)
9	DF	RUS	Denis Terentyev (on loan from Zenit St. Petersburg)
13	MF	RUS	Kirill Folmer (from Spartak Moscow)
17	MF	RUS	Nikolai Giorgobiani (from Chayka Peschanokopskoye)
21	FW	RUS	Magomedemin Rabadanov
22	DF	RUS	Artyom Golubev (on loan from Krasnodar)
34	DF	RUS	Turgay Mokhbaliyev (from Spartak Moscow)
45	MF	RUS	Aleksandr Lukyanov
62	GK	RUS	Aleksandr Zharovskikh
63	DF	RUS	Maksim Ilyin
66	FW	RUS	Artur Mulyukov (from Zvezda-2 St. Petersburg)
68	DF	RUS	Albert Gilmanshin (from Lokomotiv Moscow)
74	MF	RUS	Daniil Fomin (from Krasnodar)
75	DF	RUS	Vladimir Gerasimov
79	DF	RUS	Danila Sorokin
99	FW	RUS	Andrei Kozlov (from Orenburg)

Out: Note: Flags indicate national team as defined under FIFA eligibility rules; some limited exceptions apply. Players may hold more than one non-FIFA nationality.

No.	Pos.	Nation	Player
6	MF	SUI	Vero Salatić (to (Switzerland) Grasshoppers)
9	MF	CZE	Ondřej Vaněk (to (Czech Republic) Zbrojovka Brno)
13	MF	RUS	Azamat Zaseyev (to Alania Vladikavkaz)
17	DF	RUS	Dmitri Zhivoglyadov (to Lokomotiv Moscow)
19	MF	CRO	Ivan Paurević (to (Germany) SV Sandhausen)
37	DF	RUS	Ruslan Khaziyev (to Ufa-2)
44	FW	NGR	Sylvester Igboun (on loan to Dynamo Moscow)
45	MF	RUS	Marsel Yenikeyev
47	MF	RUS	Artyom Yegorov (to Ufa-2)
51	MF	RUS	Mark Krivorog (to Volga Ulyanovsk)
62	GK	RUS	Airat Safin
63	DF	RUS	Dinar Akhmetov
66	DF	RUS	Timur Kutlusurin
67	DF	RUS	Lev Safronov
71	DF	RUS	Nikita Gurkov
72	MF	RUS	Valentin Videneyev (to Ufa-2)
75	MF	RUS	Denis Reshetnikov
84	DF	RUS	Eduard Gavrilov
86	MF	RUS	Daniel Gumerov (to Dolgoprudny)
87	MF	RUS	Igor Bezdenezhnykh (on loan to Chayka Peschanokopskoye)
88	GK	RUS	Timur Akmurzin (end of loan from Rubin Kazan)
90	FW	RUS	Vyacheslav Zhuravlyov (to Kolomna)
—	DF	RUS	Andrei Batyutin (to Avangard Kursk, previously on loan)
—	DF	RUS	Igor Diveyev (to CSKA Moscow, previously on loan)
—	DF	RUS	Victor Patrașco (to Shinnik Yaroslavl, previously on loan to Luch Vladivostok)
—	FW	KAZ	Yerkebulan Seydakhmet (to (Kazakhstan) Kairat, previously on loan to (Bulgaria) Levski Sofia)

=== Ural Yekaterinburg ===
In: Note: Flags indicate national team as defined under FIFA eligibility rules; some limited exceptions apply. Players may hold more than one non-FIFA nationality.

No.	Pos.	Nation	Player
4	DF	RUS	Artyom Mamin (from Spartak Moscow)
6	MF	POL	Rafał Augustyniak (from (Poland) Miedź Legnica)
18	MF	POL	Michał Kucharczyk (from (Poland) Legia Warsaw)
20	FW	RUS	Andrei Panyukov (from Zenit St. Petersburg, previously on loan)
21	DF	RUS	Islamzhan Nasyrov (from Nosta Novotroitsk)
41	MF	RUS	Konstantin Malitsky
49	DF	RUS	Kirill Gurov
46	GK	RUS	Sergei Dudin
50	DF	RUS	Nikita Chistyakov (from Anzhi Makhachkala)
64	MF	RUS	Maksim Kryukov
67	MF	RUS	Maks Zhestaryov
69	MF	RUS	Artyom Shabolin (from Nosta Novotroitsk)
70	MF	RUS	Anatoli Anisimov (from CSKA Moscow)
76	GK	RUS	Ilya Ignatyev
78	MF	RUS	Aleksandr Nekrasov (from Zenit St. Petersburg)
79	MF	RUS	Artyom Yusupov (end of loan to Zenit St. Petersburg)
90	MF	RUS	Aleksandr Shcherbakov (end of loan to (Cyprus) Enosis Neon Paralimni)

Out: Note: Flags indicate national team as defined under FIFA eligibility rules; some limited exceptions apply. Players may hold more than one non-FIFA nationality.

No.	Pos.	Nation	Player
4	DF	RUS	Sergei Bryzgalov (to Fakel Voronezh)
5	DF	SRB	Dominik Dinga (on loan to (Serbia) Partizan)
6	DF	SLO	Gregor Balažic
7	DF	RUS	Aleksandr Dantsev (retired)
8	DF	NOR	Stefan Strandberg (end of loan from Krasnodar)
22	MF	SUI	Marco Aratore (on loan to (Switzerland) Lugano)
22	MF	RUS	Kirill Kochnev (to (Armenia) Aragats)
35	FW	RUS	Yevgeni Tatarinov (on loan to Torpedo Moscow)
46	DF	RUS	Vyacheslav Berdnikov
64	DF	RUS	Ivan Vereshchagin
65	MF	RUS	Aleksandr Galimov (on loan to (Armenia) Pyunik)
67	DF	RUS	Kirill Lukyanchikov (to Rodina Moscow)
70	MF	RUS	Ilya Zhigulyov (end of loan from Krasnodar)
75	MF	RUS	Pavel Kirillov
76	DF	RUS	Yegor Badyin (to Tambov)
93	MF	RUS	Denis Drozhalkin
94	MF	RUS	Anatoli Katrich (to Luch Vladivostok)
95	MF	RUS	Andrei Tushkov
98	GK	RUS	Semyon Morozov (to Lada Dimitrovgrad)
—	DF	RUS	Vladimir Khozin (to Nizhny Novgorod, previously on loan to Ararat-Armenia)
—	MF	RUS	Aleksandr Lomakin (on loan to Yenisey Krasnoyarsk, previously on loan to Fakel Voronezh)

=== Zenit Saint Petersburg ===
In: Note: Flags indicate national team as defined under FIFA eligibility rules; some limited exceptions apply. Players may hold more than one non-FIFA nationality.

No.	Pos.	Nation	Player
3	DF	BRA	Douglas Santos (from (Germany) Hamburger SV)
4	DF	VEN	Yordan Osorio (on loan from (Portugal) Porto)
8	MF	BRA	Malcom (from (Spain) Barcelona)
15	DF	RUS	Vyacheslav Karavayev (from (Netherlands) Vitesse)
34	DF	RUS	Sergei Zuykov (end of loan to Tambov)
39	MF	RUS	Vladimir Khubulov (on loan from Akhmat Grozny)
42	DF	RUS	Danila Varichev (from UOR-5 Yegoryevsk)
47	FW	RUS	Kirill Kosarev (on loan from Murom)
53	DF	RUS	Aleksandr Sandrachuk
57	DF	RUS	Gleb Zakharov (from Yenisey Krasnoyarsk)
68	FW	RUS	Ivan Korshunov (from own academy)
69	DF	BLR	Dmitri Prischepa (on loan from (Belarus) Minsk)
71	GK	RUS	Daniil Odoyevskiy
75	MF	RUS	Artyom Maksimenko (on loan from Nizhny Novgorod)
78	GK	RUS	Aleksandr Vasyutin (from (Norway) Sarpsborg)
79	MF	RUS	Georgy Karginov (from Spartak Vladikavkaz)
81	MF	RUS	Kirill Shchetinin (from Lokomotiv Moscow)
82	GK	RUS	Ivan Kukushkin (from own academy)
83	DF	RUS	Ivan Bychkov
85	GK	RUS	Vladislav Bakonin
90	FW	RUS	Aleksei Gasilin (on loan from Tom Tomsk)
91	MF	RUS	Aleksei Sutormin (from Rubin Kazan)
93	MF	RUS	Mikhail Pogorelov (from Strogino Moscow)
97	DF	RUS	Islam Zhilov (from Urozhay Krasnodar)

Out: Note: Flags indicate national team as defined under FIFA eligibility rules; some limited exceptions apply. Players may hold more than one non-FIFA nationality.

No.	Pos.	Nation	Player
2	DF	RUS	Aleksandr Anyukov (on loan to Krylia Sovetov Samara)
10	MF	ITA	Claudio Marchisio
10	MF	ARG	Emiliano Rigoni (on loan to (Italy) Sampdoria)
13	DF	POR	Luís Neto (to (Portugal) Sporting)
15	DF	RUS	Elmir Nabiullin (to Sochi)
16	MF	ECU	Christian Noboa (to Sochi)
23	DF	SLO	Miha Mevlja (to Sochi, previously on loan to Rostov)
29	FW	RUS	Anton Zabolotny (to Sochi)
31	GK	RUS	Mikhail Ponomarenko (to Luch Vladivostok)
32	GK	RUS	Aleksei Gorodovoy (end of loan from Rubin Kazan)
33	MF	BRA	Hernani (on loan to (Italy) Parma)
35	FW	RUS	Yuri Pershin (to Dynamo Bryansk)
36	MF	RUS	Artyom Yusupov (end of loan from Ural Yekaterinburg)
36	MF	RUS	Andrei Mostovoy (on loan to Sochi)
39	DF	RUS	Ivan Maklakov (to Baltika Kaliningrad)
42	FW	RUS	Vasili Yatskov (to Almaz-Antey St. Petersburg)
43	MF	RUS	Nikita Koldunov (to Sochi)
47	MF	RUS	Beka Dzhanelidze (to Sochi)
48	GK	RUS	Nodari Kalichava (to Zvezda St. Petersburg)
49	MF	RUS	Dmitry Pletnyov (to Tom Tomsk)
49	DF	RUS	Denis Terentyev (on loan to Ufa)
52	MF	RUS	Andrei Anisimov (to Leningradets Leningrad Oblast)
53	DF	RUS	Kirill Aloyan (to (Armenia) Alashkert)
57	DF	RUS	Aleksei Ivanov (to Arsenal Tula)
68	DF	RUS	Nikita Olishevsky (to Sokol Saratov)
69	MF	RUS	Nikita Miroshnichenko (to Spartak Moscow)
71	MF	RUS	Danila Buranov (end of loan from Arsenal Tula)
73	DF	RUS	Aleksey Plotnikov (to Zvezda St. Petersburg)
75	FW	RUS	Mikhail Markin (end of loan from Mordovia Saransk)
77	FW	MNE	Luka Đorđević (to Lokomotiv Moscow, previously on loan to Arsenal Tula)
77	DF	RUS	Artyom Vyatkin (to Chayka Peschanokopskoye)
79	MF	RUS	Ilya Gritsak (to Lokomotiv Moscow)
78	FW	RUS	Aleksandr Nekrasov (to Ural Yekaterinburg)
83	DF	RUS	Aleksandr Korotkov (to Rodina Moscow)
85	FW	RUS	Yuri Kozlov (to Ufa-2)
88	FW	RUS	Dmitry Bogayev
90	FW	RUS	Ilya Grishchenko
91	FW	RUS	Artyom Dyakonov
93	GK	RUS	Mikhail Kizeyev
95	FW	RUS	Nikita Sudarikov
97	MF	RUS	Ilya Kamyshev (to Chertanovo Moscow)
98	FW	RUS	Aleksandr Yelovskikh (to Zvezda St. Petersburg)
—	GK	RUS	Yegor Baburin (to Rostov, previously on loan to Rubin Kazan)
—	GK	RUS	Yuri Lodygin (to (Turkey) Gazişehir Gaziantep, previously on loan to (Greece) Olympiacos)
—	GK	RUS	Igor Obukhov (on loan to SKA-Khabarovsk, previously on loan to Tyumen)
—	DF	RUS	Danil Krugovoy (on loan to Ufa, previously from Ufa)
—	DF	RUS	Ivan Novoseltsev (to Sochi, previously on loan to Rostov)
—	DF	RUS	Ibragim Tsallagov (to Sochi, previously on loan to Rubin Kazan)
—	MF	RUS	Vitali Gorulyov (to SKA-Khabarovsk, previously on loan to Volgar Astrakhan)
—	FW	RUS	Andrei Panyukov (to Ural Yekaterinburg, previously on loan)
—	FW	RUS	Dmitry Poloz (to Sochi, previously on loan to Rubin Kazan)
—	FW	RUS	Nikolai Prudnikov (to Chertanovo Moscow, previously on loan)
