= 2019–20 FC Ufa season =

FC Ufa
2019–20 season
- Chairman: Marat Magadeyev
- Manager: Vadim Evseev
- Stadium: Neftyanik Stadium
- Premier League: 9th
- Russian Cup: Round of 16 vs CSKA Moscow
- Top goalscorer: League: Daniil Fomin (6); All: Daniil Fomin (6)
Home colours	Away colours

The 2019–20 FC Ufa season was their sixth successive season in the Russian Premier League, the highest tier of association football in Russia, and seventh in total.

== Season review ==
On 17 March, the Russian Premier League postponed all league fixtures until April 10th due to the COVID-19 pandemic.

On 1 April, the Russian Football Union extended the suspension of football until 31 May.

On 15 May, the Russian Football Union announced that the Russian Premier League season would resume on 21 June.

== Squad ==
As of 10 February 2020

Note: Flags indicate national team as defined under FIFA eligibility rules; some limited exceptions apply. Players may hold more than one non-FIFA nationality.

No.	Pos.	Nation	Player
1	GK	RUS	Aleksei Chernov
2	DF	RUS	Danil Krugovoy (on loan from Zenit St. Petersburg)
3	DF	RUS	Pavel Alikin
4	DF	RUS	Aleksei Nikitin
5	DF	SLO	Bojan Jokić
6	MF	UZB	Oston Urunov
7	MF	RUS	Dmitri Sysuyev
8	MF	MDA	Cătălin Carp
9	DF	RUS	Denis Terentyev (on loan from Zenit St. Petersburg)
10	MF	LUX	Olivier Thill
11	FW	SLO	Lovro Bizjak
13	MF	RUS	Kirill Folmer
15	DF	RUS	Aleksandr Putsko
16	GK	RUS	Yury Shafinsky
17	MF	RUS	Nikolai Giorgobiani
19	FW	RUS	Gamid Agalarov

No.	Pos.	Nation	Player
21	FW	RUS	Magomedemin Rabadanov
22	DF	RUS	Artyom Golubev (loan from Krasnodar )
23	MF	RUS	Danila Yemelyanov
27	DF	ROU	Ionuț Nedelcearu
31	GK	RUS	Aleksandr Belenov
32	FW	SLO	Andrés Vombergar
33	DF	RUS	Aleksandr Sukhov
34	DF	RUS	Turgay Mokhbaliyev
55	DF	GEO	Jemal Tabidze
56	DF	RUS	Danil Krugovoy
57	FW	RUS	Vyacheslav Krotov
74	MF	RUS	Daniil Fomin
77	MF	RUS	Azer Aliyev
82	MF	RUS	Nikita Belousov
87	MF	RUS	Igor Bezdenezhnykh
99	FW	RUS	Andrei Kozlov

=== Out on loan ===
Note: Flags indicate national team as defined under FIFA eligibility rules; some limited exceptions apply. Players may hold more than one non-FIFA nationality.

No.	Pos.	Nation	Player
44	FW	NGR	Sylvester Igboun (at Dynamo Moscow)
—	MF	RUS	Igor Bezdenezhnykh (at Chayka Peschanokopskoye)

== Transfers ==
=== In ===
Date	Position	Nationality	Name	From	Fee	Ref.
26 June 2019	MF	(Russia)	Daniil Fomin	Krasnodar	Undisclosed	
28 June 2019	MF	(Russia)	Nikolai Giorgobiani	Chayka Peschanokopskoye	Undisclosed	
3 July 2019	FW	(Russia)	Andrei Kozlov	Orenburg	Free	
6 July 2019	DF	(Russia)	Turgay Mokhbaliyev	Spartak Moscow	Undisclosed	
13 August 2019	MF	(Russia)	Kirill Folmer	Spartak Moscow	Undisclosed	
24 January 2020	FW	(Russia)	Gamid Agalarov	Anzhi Makhachkala	Undisclosed	
10 February 2020	MF	(Uzbekistan)	Oston Urunov	Lokomotiv Tashkent	Undisclosed	

=== Loans in ===
Date from	Position	Nationality	Name	From	Date to	Ref.
31 July 2019	DF	(Russia)	Artyom Golubev	Krasnodar	31 May 2021	
2 September 2019	DF	(Russia)	Danil Krugovoy	Zenit St.Petersburg	End of Season	
2 September 2019	DF	(Russia)	Denis Terentyev	Zenit St.Petersburg	End of Season	

=== Out ===
Date	Position	Nationality	Name	To	Fee	Ref.
Summer 2019	DF	(Russia)	Andrei Batyutin	Avangard Kursk	Undisclosed	
Summer 2019	MF	(Russia)	Azamat Zaseyev	Alania Vladikavkaz	Undisclosed	
31 May 2019	DF	(Russia)	Igor Diveyev	CSKA Moscow	Undisclosed	
11 June 2019	DF	(Russia)	Dmitri Zhivoglyadov	Lokomotiv Moscow	Undisclosed	
18 June 2019	DF	(Russia)	Victor Patrașco	Shinnik Yaroslavl	Undisclosed	
25 June 2019	MF	(Kazakhstan)	Yerkebulan Seydakhmet	Kairat	Undisclosed	
2 July 2019	MF	(Croatia)	Ivan Paurević	Sandhausen	Undisclosed	

=== Loans out ===
Date from	Position	Nationality	Name	To	Date to	Ref.
2 July 2019	MF	(Russia)	Igor Bezdenezhnykh	Chayka Peschanokopskoye	End of Season	
2 September 2019	FW	(Nigeria)	Sylvester Igboun	Dynamo Moscow	End of Season	

=== Released ===
Date	Position	Nationality	Name	Joined	Date
Summer 2019	MF	(Russia)	Mark Krivorog	Volga Ulyanovsk	
Summer 2019	MF	(Russia)	Daniel Gumerov	Dolgoprudny	
Summer 2019	FW	(Russia)	Vyacheslav Zhuravlyov	Kolomna	
3 June 2019	MF	(Switzerland)	Vero Salatić	Grasshoppers	17 June 2019
16 August 2019	MF	(Czech Republic)	Ondřej Vaněk	Zbrojovka Brno	5 September 2019

== Friendlies ==
18 January 2020	Újpest (Hungary)	2 – 0	(Russia) Ufa	Belek, Turkey
18:00 YEKT (UTC+5)	Novothny 7', 32'	Report

25 January 2020	Ufa (Russia)	0 – 1	(Poland) Śląsk Wrocław	Belek, Turkey
18:00 YEKT (UTC+5)		Report	Štiglec 51'

1 February 2020	Čukarički (Serbia)	0 – 1	(Russia) Ufa	Larnaca, Cyprus
15:00 YEKT (UTC+5)		Report	Krotov 57'

1 February 2020	Ufa (Russia)	3 – 0	(Latvia) Liepāja	Larnaca, Cyprus
20:00 YEKT (UTC+5)	Agalarov 1'; Yemelyanov (yellow card) 64'; Giorgobiani 83'	Report

5 February 2020	Ufa (Russia)	5 – 0	(Cyprus) Ayia Napa	Larnaca, Cyprus
15:00 YEKT (UTC+5)	Urunov 17'; Alikin 19'; Terentyev 24'; Vombergar 27' (pen.); Agalarov 32'	Report

5 February 2020	Ufa (Russia)	1 – 1	(Lithuania) Sūduva	Larnaca, Cyprus
20:00 YEKT (UTC+5)	Fomin 79' (pen.)	Report	Tadić 40'

8 February 2020	Ufa (Russia)	0 – 0	(Armenia) Urartu	Larnaca, Cyprus
YEKT (UTC+5)		Report

11 February 2020	Ufa (Russia)	1 – 2	Ararat-Armenia	Larnaca, Cyprus
14:15 YEKT (UTC+5)	Bizjak 57'	Report	Lima 8'; Otubanjo 81'

18 February 2020	Ufa (Russia)	2 – 1	(Switzerland) Rapperswil-Jona	Larnaca, Cyprus
20:00 YEKT (UTC+5)	Krotov 6'; Thill 34'	Report	I.Zenuni 20'

== Competitions ==
=== Premier League ===
==== Results by round ====
Round	1	2	3	4	5	6	7	8	9	10	11	12	13	14	15	16	17	18	19	20	21	22	23	24	25	26	27	28	29	30
Ground	A	H	H	A	A	H	H	H	A	H	A	H	H	A	H	A	H	A	A	A	A	A	H	A	H	H	A	A	H	H
Result	L	L	W	D	L	W	W	L	D	W	D	L	D	L	D	D	D	W	W	L	D	D	W	D	D	D	W	D	L	D
Position	11	13	11	12	13	10	9	10	9	8	6	6	8	11	11	10	11	8	7	8	8	9	8	8	6	6	6	8	8	9

Updated to match(es) played on 22 July 2020. Source: See Results
A = Away; H = Home; W = Win; D = Draw; L = Loss

==== Results ====
13 July 2019 1	Ural Yekaterinburg	3 – 2	Ufa	Yekaterinburg
18:30 YEKT (UTC+5)	Bicfalvi 14', 49'; Bavin 81'	Report	Sysuyev (yellow card) 58'; Kozlov 76'; Fomin 86' (pen.)	Stadium: Central Stadium; Attendance: 14,614; Referee: Sergei Karasev

20 July 2019 2	Ufa	2 – 3	Krasnodar	Ufa
16:00 YEKT (UTC+5)	Carp 28'; Tabidze 40'; Igboun (yellow card) 64'; Krotov (yellow card) 87'	Report	Spajić (yellow card) 28'; Namli 49'; Ramírez (yellow card) 54'; Vilhena 73'; Tabidze 87'	Stadium: Neftyanik Stadium; Attendance: 6,725; Referee: Aleksei Yeskov

27 July 2019 3	Ufa	2 – 1	Krylia Sovetov	Ufa
16:00 YEKT (UTC+5)	Fomin 21'; Poluyakhtov 33' (o.g.); Putsko (yellow card) 51'	Report	Mijailović 25'; Poluyakhtov (yellow card) 57'; Sobolev (yellow card) 60'	Stadium: Neftyanik Stadium; Attendance: 6,543; Referee: Vasiliy Kazartsev

4 August 2019 4	Sochi	1 – 1	Ufa	Sochi
23:30 YEKT (UTC+5)	Kudryashov (yellow card) 19'; Miladinović (yellow card) 42'	Report	Fomin (yellow card) 73'; Belenov (yellow card) 90+1'	Stadium: Fisht Olympic Stadium; Attendance: 11,100; Referee: Aleksey Sukhoy

11 August 2019 5	Arsenal Tula	1 – 0	Ufa	Tula
16:00 YEKT (UTC+5)	Lomovitsky (yellow card) 21'; Álvarez 28'	Report	Carp (yellow card) 70'	Stadium: Arsenal Stadium; Attendance: 11,340; Referee: Mikhail Vilkov

18 August 2019 6	Ufa	2 – 0	Rostov	Ufa
18:30 YEKT (UTC+5)	Yemelyanov (yellow card) 22'; Igboun 40', 79'; Sukhov (yellow card) 89'; Jokić (yellow card) 90+4'	Report	Glebov (yellow card) 18'; Pesyakov (yellow card) 40'; Sigurðsson (yellow card) 73'	Stadium: Neftyanik Stadium; Attendance: 8,532; Referee: Evgeny Turbin

24 August 2019 7	Ufa	1 – 0	Zenit St.Petersburg	Ufa
18:30 YEKT (UTC+5)	Fomin (yellow card) 52' (goal) 79'; Carp (yellow card) 53'; Belenov (yellow card) 76'	Report	Ozdoyev (yellow card) 35'; Yerokhin (yellow card) 46'; Ivanović (yellow card) 87'; Rakitskiy (yellow card) 90'	Stadium: Neftyanik Stadium; Attendance: 13,368; Referee: Sergey Ivanov

31 August 2019 8	Ufa	1 – 2	Orenburg	Ufa
13:30 YEKT (UTC+5)	Carp (yellow card) 2'; Putsko (yellow card) 39' (yellow-red card) 45+1'; Krotov 68'	Report	Shakhov (yellow card) 22' (yellow-red card) 53'; Despotović 40' (pen.); Ayupov (yellow card) 45'; Zotov 66'; Afonin (yellow card) 90+1'	Stadium: Neftyanik Stadium; Attendance: 6,892; Referee: Igor Panin

16 September 2019 9	Dynamo Moscow	0 – 0	UFA	Moscow
22:00 YEKT (UTC+5)	Yevgenyev (yellow card) 77'	Report	Alikin (yellow card) 25'; Sukhov (yellow card) 71'	Stadium: VTB Arena; Attendance: 9,538; Referee: Vitali Meshkov

20 September 2019 10	Ufa	1 – 0	Spartak Moscow	Ufa
19:30 YEKT (UTC+5)	Rasskazov 13' (o.g.); Thill (yellow card) 26'; Tabidze (yellow card) 74'	Report	Gigot (yellow card) 16'; Guliyev (yellow card) 33'; Schürrle (yellow card) 72'; Til (yellow card) 79'; Kutepov (yellow card) 86'	Stadium: Neftyanik Stadium; Attendance: 10,809; Referee: Aleksey Sukhoy

29 September 2019 11	Rubin Kazan	1 – 1	Ufa	Kazan
16:00 YEKT (UTC+5)	Uremović (yellow card) 12'; Tashayev (yellow card) 57'; Markov (yellow card) 57'; Konovalov (yellow card) 87'	Report	Fomin (yellow card) 59'	Stadium: Kazan Arena; Attendance: 8,314; Referee: Aleksei Matyunin

5 October 2019 12	Ufa	0 – 1	Akhmat Grozny	Ufa
13:30 YEKT (UTC+5)	Vombergar (yellow card) 32'; Tabidze (yellow card) 55'	Report	Ángel 9'; Glushakov (yellow card) 25'; Ponce (yellow card) 40'	Stadium: Neftyanik Stadium; Attendance: 7,538; Referee: Vladislav Bezborodov

20 October 2019 13	Ufa	1 – 1	CSKA Moscow	Ufa
16:00 YEKT (UTC+5)	Terentyev (yellow card) 41'; Fomin (yellow card) 66'; Krotov 83'	Report	Akhmetov 26'	Stadium: Neftyanik Stadium; Attendance: 11,282; Referee: Nikolay Voloshin

26 October 2019 14	Tambov	3 – 0	Ufa	Saransk
16:00 YEKT (UTC+5)	Kostyukov 12'; Tetrashvili (yellow card) 53'; Obukhov 63'; Oyewole 66'; Kilin (yellow card) 80'; Ciupercă (yellow card) 82' (yellow-red card) 84'	Report	Vombergar (yellow card) 19'; Golubev (yellow card) 21'; Bizjak (yellow card) 37'; Carp (yellow card) 51'	Stadium: Mordovia Arena; Attendance: 1,751; Referee: Sergey Lapochkin
Note: Match played at the Mordovia Arena in Saransk instead of Tambov's regular Spartak Stadium.

2 November 2019 15	Ufa	1 – 1	Lokomotiv Moscow	Ufa
16:00 YEKT (UTC+5)	Golubev (yellow card) 52'; Bizjak 72' (pen.)	Report	Eder (yellow card) 17' (goal) 59'; Zhemaletdinov (yellow card) 64'; Al.Miranchuk (yellow card) 67'; Krychowiak (yellow card) 71'; Höwedes (yellow card) 75'; Ćorluka (yellow card) 84'; Rybus (yellow card) 85'; Ignatyev (yellow card) 90+2'	Stadium: Neftyanik Stadium; Attendance: 6,157; Referee: Evgeny Turbin

10 November 2019 16	Orenburg	0 – 0	Ufa	Orenburg
12:30 YEKT (UTC+5)	Radaković (yellow card) 73'; Ayupov (yellow card) 90'	Report		Stadium: Gazovik Stadium; Attendance: 2,582; Referee: Mikhail Vilkov

24 November 2019 17	Ufa	1 – 1	Sochi	Ufa
13:30 YEKT (UTC+5)	Fomin (yellow card) 38'; Krotov (yellow card) 49'; Sukhov (yellow card) 60'; Vombergar 85'	Report	Tsallagov (yellow card) 9'; Poloz 25'; Burmistrov (yellow card) 49'	Stadium: Neftyanik Stadium; Attendance: 4,198; Referee: Aleksei Matyunin

30 November 2019 18	Krylia Sovetov	0 – 1	Ufa	Samara
16:00 YEKT (UTC+5)	Lystsov (yellow card) 90'	Report	Bizjak 25'; Putsko (yellow card) 33'; Carp (yellow card) 49'; Jokić (yellow card) 70'	Stadium: Samara Arena; Attendance: 5,349; Referee: Stanislav Vasilyev

7 December 2019 19	Akhmat Grozny	0 – 1	Ufa	Grozny
21:00 YEKT (UTC+5)		Report	Aliyev 10'	Stadium: Akhmat-Arena; Attendance: 13,214; Referee: Sergei Karasev

1 March 2019 20	Krasnodar	2 – 0	Ufa	Krasnodar
18:30 YEKT (UTC+5)	Petrov (yellow card) 45+1'; Kaio (yellow card) 48'; Olsson (yellow card) 58'; Berg 67'; Wanderson (yellow card) 70'; Ari 83' (pen.)	Report	Sukhov (yellow card) 24'; Thill (yellow card) 67'; Jokić (yellow card) 80'; Belenov (yellow card) 81'; Vombergar (yellow card) 84'	Stadium: Krasnodar Stadium; Attendance: 31,966; Referee: Stanislav Vasilyev

9 March 2020 21	Zenit St.Petersburg	0 – 0	Ufa	Saint Petersburg
21:00 YEKT (UTC+5)	Rakitskiy (yellow card) 50'; Barrios (yellow card) 77'	Report	Putsko (yellow card) 29'; Bizjak (yellow card) 45+1'; Jokić (yellow card) 52'	Stadium: Krestovsky Stadium; Attendance: 42,191; Referee: Aleksey Sukhoy

15 March 2020 22	CSKA Moscow	0 – 0	Ufa	Moscow
18:30 YEKT (UTC+5)	Diveyev (yellow card) 38'	Report	Carp (yellow card) 15'; Krotov (yellow card) 30'; Nedelcearu (yellow card) 70'	Stadium: VEB Arena; Attendance: 3,428; Referee: Nikolay Voloshin

21 June 2020 23	Ufa	2 – 1	Tambov	Ufa
17:00 YEKT (UTC+5)	Fomin 20' (pen.); Krotov (yellow card) 30'; Carp (yellow card) 73'; Giorgobiani 90+1'	Report	Gritsayenko (yellow card) 26'; Tetrashvili (yellow card) 30' (red card) 36'; Ciupercă (yellow card) 57'; Filin (yellow card) 70'; Kostyukov 77'; Shelia (yellow card) 90'	Stadium: Neftyanik Stadium; Referee: Vitaly Meshkov
Note: Match originally scheduled for 22 March, but postponed on 17 March due to the COVID-19 pandemic.

27 June 2020 24	Spartak Moscow	0 – 0	Ufa	Moscow
18:30 YEKT (UTC+5)	Maslov (yellow card) 43'; Král (yellow card) 80'	Report	Nedelcearu (yellow card) 16'; Tabidze (yellow card) 44'	Stadium: Otkritie Arena; Referee: Vladislav Bezborodov
Note: Match originally scheduled for 4 April, but postponed on 17 March due to the COVID-19 pandemic.

1 July 2020 25	Ufa	0 – 0	Rubin Kazan	Ufa
17:00 YEKT (UTC+5)	Nedelcearu (yellow card) 22'; Krotov (yellow card) 26'; Carp (yellow card) 28'	Report	Uremović (yellow card) 74'; Samoshnikov (yellow card) 82'	Stadium: Neftyanik Stadium; Referee: Evgeny Turbin
Note: Match originally scheduled for 10 April, but postponed on 1 April due to the COVID-19 pandemic.

5 July 2020 26	Ufa	1 – 1	Ural Yekaterinburg	Ufa
18:30 YEKT (UTC+5)	Urunov (yellow card) 33'; Nedelcearu (yellow card) 39' (yellow-red card) 65'; Terentyev (yellow card) 49' (goal) 90+3'; Jokić (yellow card) 65'; Putsko (yellow card) 80'	Report	Kalinin (yellow card) 60'; El Kabir 66'; Boumal (yellow card) 71'	Stadium: Neftyanik Stadium; Referee: Sergey Lapochkin
Note: Match originally scheduled for 18 April, but postponed on 1 April due to the COVID-19 pandemic.

8 July 2020 27	Rostov	1 – 2	Ufa	Rostov-on-Don
22:30 YEKT (UTC+5)	Hadžikadunić 27'; Popov (yellow card) 45'; Bayramyan (yellow card) 67'; Glebov (yellow card) 83'; Normann (yellow card) 86'; Proshlyakov (yellow card) 89'; Logashov (yellow card) 90+1'	Report	Tabidze (yellow card) 61'; Fomin 68' (pen.); Krotov 75'; Aliyev (yellow card) 85'	Stadium: Rostov Arena; Referee: Aleksei Eskov
Note: Match originally scheduled for 25 April, but postponed on 1 April due to the COVID-19 pandemic.

12 July 2020 28	Lokomotiv Moscow	1 – 1	Ufa	Moscow
18:30 YEKT (UTC+5)	Murilo 38'; Krychowiak (yellow card) 49'; Zhemaletdinov (yellow card) 74'; Farfán 81'	Report	Fomin 39' (pen.); Urunov (yellow card) 43'; Sukhov (yellow card) 51'; Bizjak (yellow card) 72'	Stadium: RZD Arena; Referee: Vladislav Bezborodov
Note: Match originally scheduled for 2 May, but postponed on 1 April due to the COVID-19 pandemic.

16 July 2020 29	Ufa	0 – 1	Dynamo Moscow	Ufa
20:00 YEKT (UTC+5)	Yemelyanov (yellow card) 55'; Alikin (yellow card) 72'	Report	Joãozinho 79' (pen.)	Stadium: Neftyanik Stadium; Referee: Pavel Kukuyan
Note: Match originally scheduled for 6 May, but postponed on 1 April due to the COVID-19 pandemic.

22 July 2020 30	Ufa	0 – 0	Arsenal Tula	Ufa
21:00 YEKT (UTC+5)	Thill (yellow card) 43'	Report	Belyayev (yellow card) 53'; Čaušić (yellow card) 79'; Gromyko (yellow card) 90'	Stadium: Neftyanik Stadium; Referee: Aleksey Matyunin
Note: Match originally scheduled for 17 May, but postponed on 1 April due to the COVID-19 pandemic.

==== League table ====
Pos	Team	Pld	W	D	L	GF	GA	GD	Pts
7	Spartak Moscow	30	11	6	13	35	33	+2	39
8	Arsenal Tula	30	11	5	14	37	41	−4	38 (Note: Head-to-head points: Arsenal Tula 4, Ufa 1)
9	Ufa	30	8	14	8	22	24	−2	38
10	Rubin Kazan	30	8	11	11	18	28	−10	35 (Note: Head-to-head points: Rubin Kazan 4, Ural 1)
11	Ural	30	9	8	13	36	53	−17	35

Source: Russian Premier Liga, Soccerway
Rules for classification: 1) Points; 2) Head-to-head points; 3) Head-to-head matches won; 4) Head-to-head goal difference; 5) Head-to-head goals scored; 6) Matches won; 7) Goal difference; 8) Goals scored; 9) Play-off.

=== Russian Cup ===
25 September 2019 Round of 32	Chayka Peschanokopskoye	0 – 1	Ufa	Peschanokopskoye
20:00 YEKT (UTC+5)	Dubovoy (red card) 53'; Korotayev (yellow card) 87'	Report	Bizjak 37'; Fomin (yellow card) 38'; Nikitin (yellow card) 54' (yellow-red card) 56'; Golubev (yellow card) 55'; Giorgobiani (yellow card) 63'; Vombergar (yellow card) 82'	Stadium: Central Stadium; Attendance: 1,673; Referee: Kirill Levnikov

30 October 2019 Round of 16	CSKA Moscow	1 – 0	Ufa	Moscow
21:00 YEKT (UTC+5)	Bijol 90+2'	Report	Nedelcearu (yellow card) 61'; Alikin (yellow card) 67'	Stadium: VEB Arena; Attendance: 5,192; Referee: Sergey Ivanov

== Squad statistics ==
As of match played 22 July 2020

=== Appearances and goals ===
No.	Pos	Nat	Player	Total		Premier League		Russian Cup	
No.	Pos	Nat	Player	Apps	Goals	Apps	Goals	Apps	Goals
1	GK	(Russia) RUS	Aleksei Chernov	4	0	4	0	0	0
2	DF	(Russia) RUS	Danil Krugovoy	13	0	8+4	0	0+1	0
3	DF	(Russia) RUS	Pavel Alikin	11	0	7+2	0	2	0
4	DF	(Russia) RUS	Aleksei Nikitin	9	0	8	0	1	0
5	DF	(Slovenia) SLO	Bojan Jokić	15	0	14+1	0	0	0
6	MF	(Uzbekistan) UZB	Oston Urunov	10	0	9+1	0	0	0
7	MF	(Russia) RUS	Dmitri Sysuyev	2	0	1+1	0	0	0
8	MF	(Moldova) MDA	Cătălin Carp	25	1	24	1	1	0
9	DF	(Russia) RUS	Denis Terentyev	12	1	3+7	1	2	0
10	MF	(Luxembourg) LUX	Olivier Thill	24	0	17+5	0	0+2	0
11	FW	(Slovenia) SLO	Lovro Bizjak	27	3	14+11	2	1+1	1
15	DF	(Russia) RUS	Aleksandr Putsko	21	0	19+1	0	1	0
17	MF	(Russia) RUS	Nikolai Giorgobiani	15	1	5+9	1	1	0
19	FW	(Russia) RUS	Gamid Agalarov	5	0	3+2	0	0	0
21	FW	(Russia) RUS	Magomedemin Rabadanov	1	0	0+1	0	0	0
22	DF	(Russia) RUS	Artyom Golubev	20	0	9+10	0	1	0
23	MF	(Russia) RUS	Danila Yemelyanov	13	0	7+5	0	1	0
27	DF	(Romania) ROU	Ionuț Nedelcearu	21	0	20	0	1	0
31	GK	(Russia) RUS	Aleksandr Belenov	28	0	26	0	2	0
32	FW	(Slovenia) SLO	Andrés Vombergar	15	1	3+11	1	0+1	0
33	DF	(Russia) RUS	Aleksandr Sukhov	29	0	28	0	1	0
55	DF	(Georgia (country)) GEO	Jemal Tabidze	26	1	25	1	1	0
57	FW	(Russia) RUS	Vyacheslav Krotov	22	3	15+6	3	1	0
74	MF	(Russia) RUS	Daniil Fomin	29	6	27	6	2	0
77	MF	(Russia) RUS	Azer Aliyev	21	1	16+3	1	2	0
82	MF	(Russia) RUS	Nikita Belousov	1	0	1	0	0	0
87	MF	(Russia) RUS	Igor Bezdenezhnykh	2	0	2	0	0	0
99	FW	(Russia) RUS	Andrei Kozlov	18	1	9+7	1	1+1	0
Players away from the club on loan:
44	FW	(Nigeria) NGR	Sylvester Igboun	6	2	6	2	0	0
Players who appeared for Ufa but left during the season:
13	MF	(Russia) RUS	Azamat Zaseyev	1	0	0+1	0	0	0

=== Goal scorers ===
Place	Position	Nation	Number	Name	Premier League	Russian Cup	Total
1	MF	(Russia)	74	Daniil Fomin	6	0	6
2	FW	(Russia)	57	Vyacheslav Krotov	3	0	3
2	FW	(Slovenia)	11	Lovro Bizjak	2	1	3
4	FW	(Nigeria)	44	Sylvester Igboun	2	0	2
4				Own goal	2	0	2
6	FW	(Russia)	99	Andrei Kozlov	1	0	1
6	MF	(Russia)	8	Cătălin Carp	1	0	1
6	DF	(Georgia (country))	55	Jemal Tabidze	1	0	1
6	FW	(Slovenia)	32	Andrés Vombergar	1	0	1
6	MF	(Russia)	77	Azer Aliyev	1	0	1
6	MF	(Russia)	17	Nikolai Giorgobiani	1	0	1
6	DF	(Russia)	9	Denis Terentyev	1	0	1
Total					22	1	23

=== Clean sheets ===
Place	Position	Nation	Number	Name	Premier League	Russian Cup	Total
1	GK	(Russia)	31	Aleksandr Belenov	11	1	12
2	GK	(Russia)	1	Aleksei Chernov	1	0	1
Total					12	1	13

=== Disciplinary record ===
Number	Nation	Position	Name	Premier League		Russian Cup		Total	
Number	Nation	Position	Name	Yellow card	Red card	Yellow card	Red card	Yellow card	Red card
3	(Russia)	DF	Pavel Alikin	2	0	1	0	3	0
4	(Russia)	DF	Aleksei Nikitin	0	0	2	1	2	1
5	(Slovenia)	DF	Bojan Jokić	5	0	0	0	5	0
6	(Uzbekistan)	MF	Oston Urunov	2	0	0	0	2	0
7	(Russia)	MF	Dmitri Sysuyev	1	0	0	0	1	0
8	(Moldova)	MF	Cătălin Carp	8	0	0	0	8	0
9	(Russia)	DF	Denis Terentyev	2	0	0	0	2	0
10	(Luxembourg)	MF	Olivier Thill	3	0	0	0	3	0
11	(Slovenia)	FW	Lovro Bizjak	3	0	0	0	3	0
15	(Russia)	DF	Aleksandr Putsko	6	1	0	0	6	1
17	(Russia)	MF	Nikolai Giorgobiani	0	0	1	0	1	0
22	(Russia)	DF	Artyom Golubev	2	0	1	0	3	0
23	(Russia)	MF	Danila Yemelyanov	2	0	0	0	2	0
27	(Romania)	DF	Ionuț Nedelcearu	5	1	1	0	6	1
31	(Russia)	GK	Aleksandr Belenov	3	0	0	0	3	0
32	(Slovenia)	FW	Andrés Vombergar	3	0	1	0	4	0
33	(Russia)	DF	Aleksandr Sukhov	5	0	0	0	5	0
55	(Georgia (country))	DF	Jemal Tabidze	4	0	0	0	4	0
57	(Russia)	FW	Vyacheslav Krotov	5	0	0	0	5	0
74	(Russia)	MF	Daniil Fomin	5	0	1	0	6	0
77	(Russia)	MF	Azer Aliyev	1	0	0	0	1	0
Players away on loan:
44	(Nigeria)	FW	Sylvester Igboun	1	0	0	0	1	0
Players who left Ufa during the season:
Total				68	2	8	1	76	3
