= Mikhail Ryzhov =

Mikhail Ryzhov is the name of:

- Mikhail Ryzhov (footballer) (born 1981), Russian football player
- Mikhail Ryzhov (racewalker) (born 1991), Russian racewalker
