= Aleksei Chernov =

Aleksei Chernov may refer to:

- Aleksei Chernov (footballer, born 1974), Russian football player
- Aleksei Chernov (footballer, born 1998), Russian football player
- Aleksei Ivanovich Chernov (born 1924), Hero of the Soviet Union
- Aleksei Yevgenyevich Chernov (born 1982), Russian pianist and composer
