= Danila Yemelyanov =

Russian footballer (born 2000)

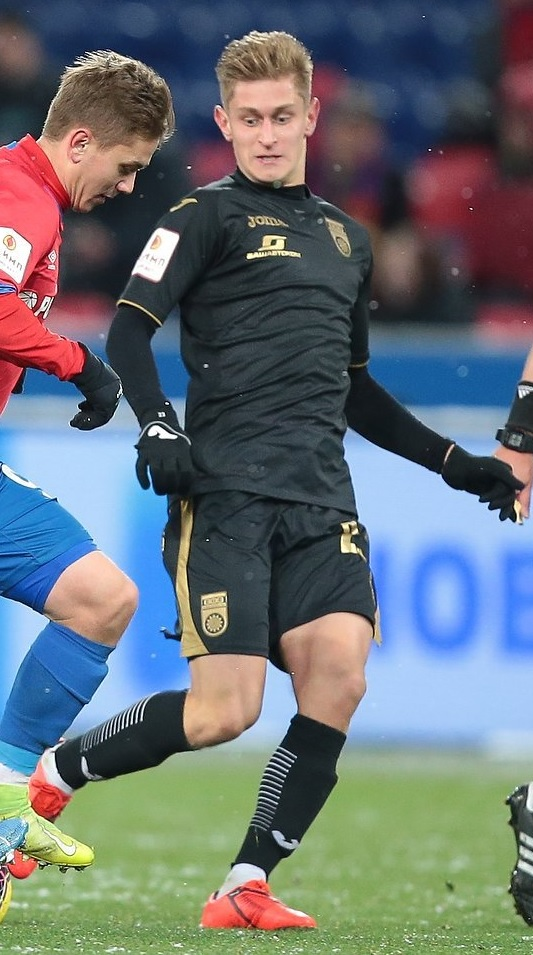
- Yemelyanov with Ufa in 2019

Personal information
- Full name: Danila Svyatoslavovich Yemelyanov
- Date of birth: 23 January 2000 (age 26)
- Place of birth: Asha, Russia
- Height: 1.80 m (5 ft 11 in)
- Position: Midfielder

Team information
- Current team: FC Leningradets Leningrad Oblast
- Number: 99

Youth career
- FC Metallurg Asha
- FC Ufa

Senior career*
Years	Team	Apps	(Gls)
2016–2023	FC Ufa	56	(1)
2018–2020	FC Ufa-2	22	(4)
2020–2021	→ FC Volgar Astrakhan (loan)	22	(0)
2021	→ FC Neftekhimik Nizhnekamsk (loan)	24	(4)
2023–2025	FC Neftekhimik Nizhnekamsk	59	(5)
2025–2026	FC Chelyabinsk	6	(1)
2026	→ FC Leningradets Leningrad Oblast (loan)	17	(1)
2026–	FC Leningradets Leningrad Oblast	0	(0)

International career^{‡}
2017	Russia U-17	5	(1)
- * Club domestic league appearances and goals as of 13 June 2026 ‡ National team caps and goals as of 26 March 2017

Danila Svyatoslavovich Yemelyanov (Russian: Данила Святославович Емельянов; born 23 January 2000) is a Russian football player who plays as an attacking midfielder for FC Leningradets Leningrad Oblast.

== Club career ==
He made his debut in the Russian Professional Football League for FC Ufa-2 on 24 July 2018 in a game against FC Neftekhimik Nizhnekamsk.

He made his debut in the Russian Premier League for FC Ufa on 13 July 2019 in a game against FC Ural Yekaterinburg, as a 67th-minute substitute for Dmitri Sysuyev.

On 7 October 2020, he joined FC Volgar Astrakhan on loan.

On 9 June 2021, he moved on loan to FC Neftekhimik Nizhnekamsk. He returned to Ufa on 29 December 2021.

== Career statistics ==
As of 28 May 2022

Club	Season	League			Cup		Continental		Other		Total	
Club	Season	Division	Apps	Goals	Apps	Goals	Apps	Goals	Apps	Goals	Apps	Goals
Ufa-2	2018–19	PFL	21	4	–		–		–		21	4
Ufa-2	2019–20	PFL	1	0	–		–		–		1	0
Ufa-2	Total		22	4	0	0	0	0	0	0	22	4
Ufa	2019–20	RPL	12	0	1	0	–		–		13	0
Ufa	2020–21	RPL	3	0	1	0	–		–		4	0
Ufa	2021–22	RPL	8	0	–		–		1 (Note: Appearance in the relegation play-offs)	0	9	0
Ufa	Total		23	0	2	0	0	0	1	0	26	0
Volgar Astrakhan (loan)	2020–21	FNL	22	0	–		–		–		22	0
Neftekhimik (loan)	2021–22	FNL	24	4	1	0	–		–		25	4
Career total			91	8	3	0	0	0	1	0	95	8
