= Sylvester Igboun =

Nigerian footballer

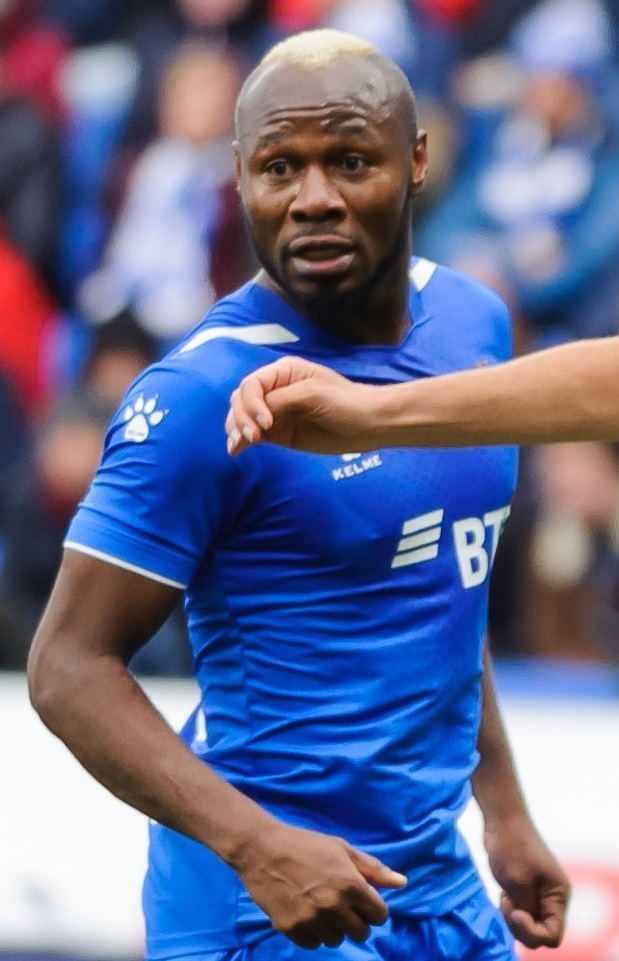
- Sly with Dynamo Moscow in 2019

Personal information
- Full name: Sylvester Emeka Igbonu
- Date of birth: 8 September 1990 (age 36)
- Place of birth: Lagos, Nigeria
- Height: 1.73 m (5 ft 8 in)
- Position: Striker

Youth career
- 2004–2006: Ebedei
- 2006–2010: Midtjylland

Senior career*
Years	Team	Apps	(Gls)
2010–2015	Midtjylland	147	(41)
2015–2020	Ufa	110	(26)
2019–2020	→ Dynamo Moscow (loan)	20	(2)
2020–2021	Dynamo Moscow	27	(1)
2022	Nizhny Novgorod	1	(0)
2022	NorthEast United	1	(0)

International career
2015	Nigeria	6	(0)
- * Club domestic league appearances and goals

Sylvester Emeka Igbonu (born 8 September 1990), commonly known as Sylvester Igboun, is a Nigerian former professional football player who played as a forward.

Igboun is known for his blistering speed. His surname is Igbonu but was misspelled when registering a passport. His shirt lists his nickname "Sly" on the back instead of his last name.

== Club career ==
On 13 July 2015, Igbonu signed for Russian Premier League side FC Ufa.

On 2 September 2019, he joined FC Dynamo Moscow on loan for the 2019–20 season. He was voted player of the month for September 2019 by Dynamo fans. On 4 August 2020, Dynamo Moscow announced that they had signed Igboun on a permanent transfer from FC Ufa. On 7 January 2022, his contract with Dynamo was terminated by mutual consent.

On 20 February 2022, Igboun joined Russian Premier League club Nizhny Novgorod until the end of the season. On 16 March 2022, the contract was terminated by mutual consent.

In September 2022, Igboun signed a two-year contract with Indian Super League club NorthEast United. On 20 October, he made his debut for the club against East Bengal, coming on as a 71st-minute substitute for Michael Jakobsen. The match ended in a 3–1 defeat. Three days later, According to Igboun, he left due to the poor facilities and accommodations provided by the team.

== International career ==
He made his international debut in a 2017 Africa Cup of Nations qualification game against Tanzania on 5 September 2015, replacing Moses Simon as a substitute in the 69th minute.

== Career statistics ==
=== Club ===
As of 20 October 2022

Club	Season	League			Cup		Continental		Other		Total	
Club	Season	Division	Apps	Goals	Apps	Goals	Apps	Goals	Apps	Goals	Apps	Goals
Midtjylland	2009–10	Danish Superliga	1	0	0	0	—		—		1	0
Midtjylland	2010–11	Danish Superliga	31	6	5 (Note: Appearance(s) in Danish Cup)	2	—		—		36	8
Midtjylland	2011–12	Danish Superliga	31	8	1	0	4 (Note: Appearance(s) in UEFA Europa League)	1	—		36	9
Midtjylland	2012–13	Danish Superliga	25	8	0	0	2	1	—		27	9
Midtjylland	2013–14	Danish Superliga	28	10	1	0	—		—		29	10
Midtjylland	2014–15	Danish Superliga	31	9	0	0	2	1	—		33	10
Midtjylland	Total		147	41	7	2	8	3	0	0	162	46
Ufa	2015–16	Russian Premier League	25	4	1 (Note: Appearance(s) in Russian Cup)	0	—		—		26	4
Ufa	2016–17	Russian Premier League	24	3	2	0	—		—		26	3
Ufa	2017–18	Russian Premier League	26	7	0	0	—		—		26	7
Ufa	2018–19	Russian Premier League	27	9	0	0	6	1	2 (Note: Appearance(s) in Relegation play-offs)	1	35	11
Ufa	2019–20	Russian Premier League	6	2	0	0	—		—		6	2
Ufa	Total		108	25	3	0	6	1	2	1	119	27
Dynamo Moscow (loan)	2019–20	Russian Premier League	20	2	1	0	—		—		21	2
Dynamo Moscow	2020–21	Russian Premier League	17	1	2	0	1	0	—		20	1
Dynamo Moscow	2021–22	Russian Premier League	10	0	2	1	—		—		12	1
Dynamo Moscow	Total		27	1	4	1	1	0	0	0	32	2
Nizhny Novgorod	2021–22	Russian Premier League	1	0	1	0	—		—		2	0
NorthEast United	2022–23	Indian Super League	1	0	0	0	—		—		1	0
Career total			304	69	16	3	15	4	2	1	337	77

=== International ===
Nigeria
Year	Apps	Goals
2015	6	0
Total	6	0

Statistics accurate as of match played 17 November 2015

== Honours ==
Midtjylland

- Danish Superliga: 2014–15
