= Svyatoslav Shabanov =

Russian footballer

Personal information
- Full name: Svyatoslav Yuryevich Shabanov
- Date of birth: 23 March 1993 (age 33)
- Place of birth: Tambov, Russia
- Height: 1.80 m (5 ft 11 in)
- Position: Defender

Senior career*
Years	Team	Apps	(Gls)
2011–2013	FC Spartak Tambov	50	(0)
2013–2017	FC Tambov	11	(0)
2014	→ FC Metallurg Lipetsk (loan)	0	(0)
2017	FC Fakel Voronezh	4	(0)
2018–2019	FC Tambov	1	(0)
2018–2019	→ FC Zorky Krasnogorsk (loan)	22	(0)
2019–2020	FC Chita	12	(0)
2020	FC Volgar Astrakhan	0	(0)
2020	FC Chita	6	(0)
2021	FC Volgar Astrakhan	0	(0)
2022–2024	FC Spartak Tambov	28	(1)
- * Club domestic league appearances and goals as of 28 July 2024

Svyatoslav Yuryevich Shabanov (Russian: Святослав Юрьевич Шабанов; born 23 March 1993) is a Russian football defender.

== Club career ==
He made his debut in the Russian Second Division for FC Spartak Tambov on 26 April 2011 in a game against FC Lokomotiv Liski.

He made his Russian Football National League debut for FC Tambov on 22 October 2016 in a game against FC Tosno.
