= Aleksandr Yevinov =

Russian footballer

Personal information
- Full name: Aleksandr Aleksandrovich Yevinov
- Date of birth: 1 April 2000 (age 26)
- Place of birth: Pskov, Russia
- Height: 1.80 m (5 ft 11 in)
- Position: Defender

Youth career
- Strela Pskov
- Brigantina Pskov
- 2013–2014: Konoplyov football academy
- 2014–2017: Chertanovo Moscow

Senior career*
Years	Team	Apps	(Gls)
2018–2019	Chertanovo Moscow	1	(0)
2018–2019	Chertanovo-2 Moscow	20	(1)
2019–2020	Krylia Sovetov Samara	0	(0)
2020	Krylia Sovetov-2 Samara	6	(0)
2021	Kuban-Holding	0	(0)
2021–2022	Dynamo Stavropol	24	(1)
2022–2023	Tekstilshchik Ivanovo	4	(0)
2023	Dynamo Bryansk	14	(0)

International career^{‡}
2015–2016	Russia U-16	5	(0)
2016	Russia U-17	5	(0)
2018	Russia U-18	2	(0)
2018	Russia U-19	2	(0)
2019	Russia U-20	4	(0)
- * Club domestic league appearances and goals as of 29 October 2023 ‡ National team caps and goals as of 5 August 2019

Aleksandr Aleksandrovich Yevinov (Russian: Александр Александрович Евинов; born 1 April 2000) is a Russian football player.

== Club career ==
He made his debut in the Russian Professional Football League for Chertanovo-2 Moscow on 3 August 2018 in a game against Tekstilshchik Ivanovo.

He made his Russian Football National League debut for Chertanovo Moscow on 3 March 2019 in a game against SKA-Khabarovsk.
