= Timur Osmolovskiy =

Russian footballer (2000–2024)

Personal information
- Full name: Timur Igorevich Osmolovskiy
- Date of birth: 28 May 2000
- Place of birth: Maykop, Russia
- Date of death: 25 September 2024 (aged 24)
- Place of death: Ukraine
- Height: 1.89 m (6 ft 2 in)
- Position: Forward

Youth career
- –2015: FC Krasnodar
- 2015–2017: UOR #5 Yegoryevsk
- 2017: Football SDyuSShOR Maykop
- 2019: Akhmat Grozny
- 2019: CSKA Moscow

Senior career*
| Years | Team | Apps | (Gls) |
| 2017–2018 | Druzhba Maykop | 25 | (3) |
| 2018–2019 | Strogino Moscow | 3 | (0) |
| 2020–2021 | Spartak-2 Moscow | 6 | (0) |

International career
| 2018 | Russia U18 | 3 | (0) |
| 2019 | Russia U20 | 5 | (0) |
- * Club domestic league appearances and goals

Timur Igorevich Osmolovskiy (Russian: Тимур Игоревич Осмоловский; 28 May 2000 – 25 September 2024) was a Russian footballer played as a forward. He retired from football in 2023, after which he worked as a cattle herder in Valaam Monastery. On 25 September 2024, he was killed by a drone in Ukraine while partaking in the Russian invasion of Ukraine as a lieutenant of the Russian army.

== Club career ==
Osmolovskiy made his debut in the Russian Football National League for Spartak-2 Moscow on 27 August 2020 in a game against FC Krasnodar-2.
