= Turgay Mokhbaliyev =

Russian footballer

Personal information
- Full name: Turgay Salekh ogly Mokhbaliyev
- Date of birth: 18 January 2000 (age 26)
- Place of birth: Sirab, Azerbaijan
- Height: 1.80 m (5 ft 11 in)
- Position: Defender

Youth career
- –2011: Zenit-Volgograd
- 2011–2013: FC Olimpia Volgograd
- 2013–2019: FC Spartak Moscow
- 2019–2021: FC Ufa

Senior career*
Years	Team	Apps	(Gls)
2018–2019	FC Spartak-2 Moscow	0	(0)
2019–2021	FC Ufa	0	(0)
2019–2021	FC Ufa-2	13	(0)
2021–2022	FC Rotor-2 Volgograd	20	(2)
2021–2022	FC Rotor Volgograd	3	(1)
2022–2024	FC Legion Makhachkala	75	(3)
2025	FC Druzhba Maykop	25	(0)

International career^{‡}
2015–2016	Russia U16	4	(0)
2019	Russia U19	3	(0)
2019	Russia U20	5	(0)
- * Club domestic league appearances and goals as of 1 November 2025 ‡ National team caps and goals as of 8 August 2019

Turgay Salekh ogly Mokhbaliyev (Russian: Тургай Салех оглы Мохбалиев; born 18 January 2000) is a Russian football player.

== Club career ==
He made his debut in the Russian Football National League for FC Rotor Volgograd on 17 November 2021 in a game against FC Metallurg Lipetsk.
