= Mikhail Ryzhov (footballer) =

Russian footballer

Personal information
- Full name: Mikhail Aleksandrovich Ryzhov
- Date of birth: 16 April 1981 (age 45)
- Place of birth: Arzamas, Gorky Oblast Russian SFSR
- Height: 1.86 m (6 ft 1 in)
- Positions: Defender; midfielder

Senior career*
Years	Team	Apps	(Gls)
1998–1999	FC Torpedo Arzamas	10	(0)
2000	FC Torpedo-Viktoriya Nizhny Novgorod	32	(2)
2001–2002	FC Arsenal Tula	20	(0)
2004	FC BSK Spirovo	25	(1)
2005–2007	FC Lobnya-Alla Lobnya	90	(2)
2008	FC Zvezda Serpukhov	29	(4)
2009–2010	FC Rusichi Oryol	51	(4)
2011–2012	FC Gubkin	36	(2)
2012–2014	FC Kaluga	42	(0)
2014–2015	FC Spartak Kostroma	29	(3)
2015–2016	FC Oryol	35	(0)
2017–2019	FC Khimik-Arsenal	61	(2)
- * Club domestic league appearances and goals

Mikhail Aleksandrovich Ryzhov (Russian: Михаил Александрович Рыжов; born 16 April 1981) is a former Russian professional football player.

== Club career ==
He made his Russian Football National League debut for FC Arsenal Tula on 19 June 2001 in a game against FC Lokomotiv Chita.
