= Aleksey Chernov (footballer) =

Russian footballer

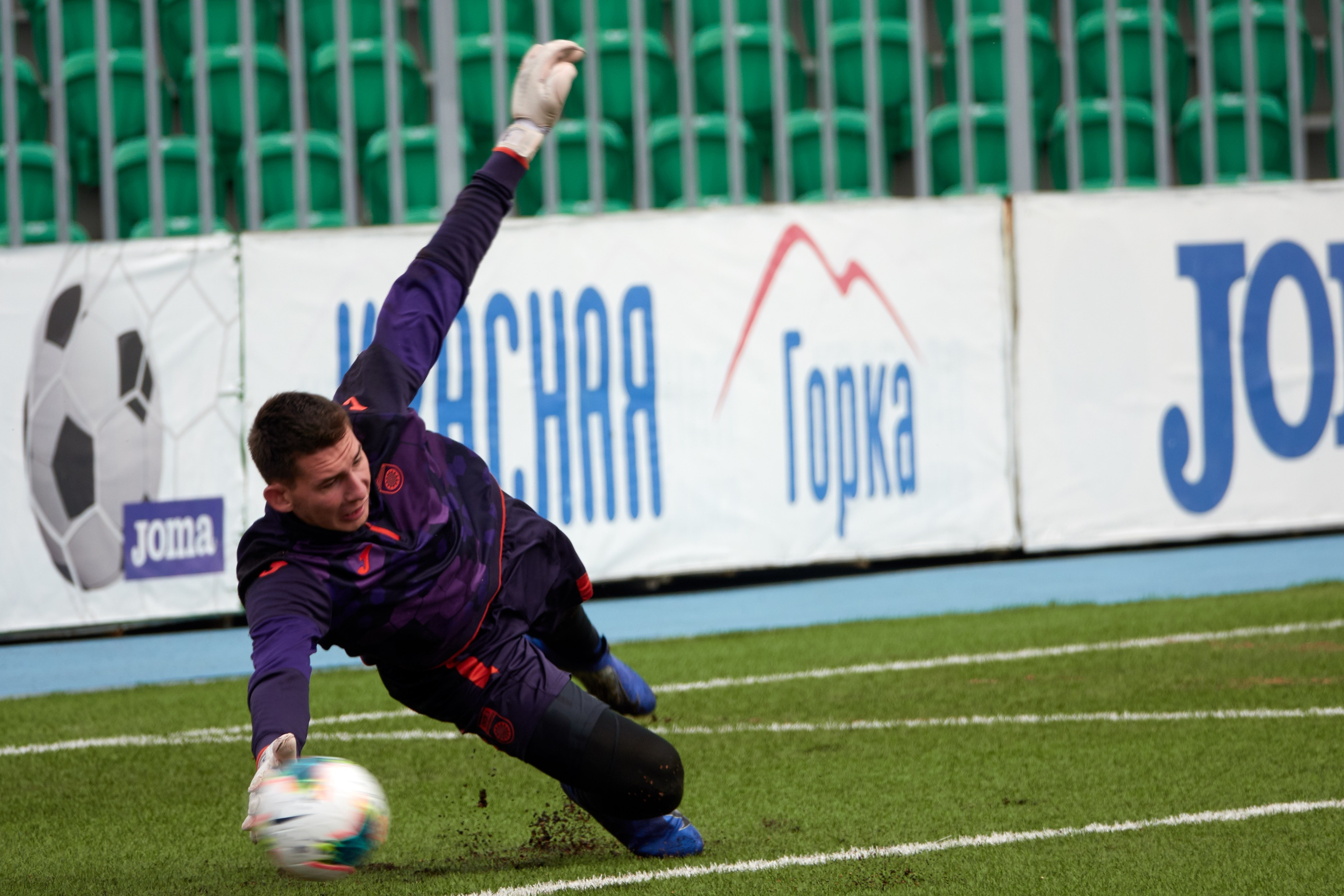

Personal information
- Full name: Aleksey Sergeyevich Chernov
- Date of birth: 3 June 1998 (age 28)
- Place of birth: Kozelsk, Russia
- Height: 1.98 m (6 ft 6 in)
- Position: Goalkeeper

Senior career*
Years	Team	Apps	(Gls)
2015–2017	FC Kaluga	27	(0)
2017–2021	FC Ufa	5	(0)
2018–2020	→ FC Ufa-2	28	(0)
2021–2022	Vejle	0	(0)
2022	FC Kaluga	3	(0)
2022–2026	FC Ufa	12	(0)
- * Club domestic league appearances and goals as of 16 May 2026

Aleksey Sergeyevich Chernov (Russian: Алексей Сергеевич Чернов; born 3 June 1998) is a Russian football goalkeeper.

== Club career ==
He made his debut in the Russian Professional Football League for FC Kaluga on 11 October 2015 in a game against FC Dynamo Bryansk.

He made his debut in the Russian Premier League for FC Ufa on 14 July 2019 in a game against FC Ural Yekaterinburg.

On 16 July 2021, he signed with Vejle in Denmark. The deal was terminated on 20 January 2022.
