= Magomedemin Rabadanov =

Russian footballer (born 2002)

Personal information
- Full name: Magomedemin Magomedrasulovich Rabadanov
- Date of birth: 5 February 2002 (age 24)
- Place of birth: Sergokala, Russia
- Height: 1.73 m (5 ft 8 in)
- Position: Midfielder

Team information
- Current team: Lokomotiv Gomel
- Number: 9

Youth career
- Spartak Moscow

Senior career*
Years	Team	Apps	(Gls)
2019–2021	Ufa	1	(0)
2019–2020	→ Ufa-2	4	(1)
2021–2022	Krasava	17	(2)
2022	Yessentuki	6	(0)
2023	Yelimay	22	(4)
2024	Energetik-BGU Minsk	11	(1)
2024–	Lokomotiv Gomel	26	(4)

International career^{‡}
2017	Russia U15	5	(0)
- * Club domestic league appearances and goals as of 29 July 2025 ‡ National team caps and goals as of 1 May 2017

Magomedemin Magomedrasulovich Rabadanov (Russian: Магомедэмин Магомедрасулович Рабаданов; born 5 February 2002) is a Russian footballer. He plays as a midfielder for Lokomotiv Gomel.

Rabadanov made his debut in the Russian Premier League for FC Ufa on 22 July 2020 in a game against FC Arsenal Tula, replacing Gamid Agalarov in the 87th minute.
