= Nikolai Giorgobiani =

Russian footballer

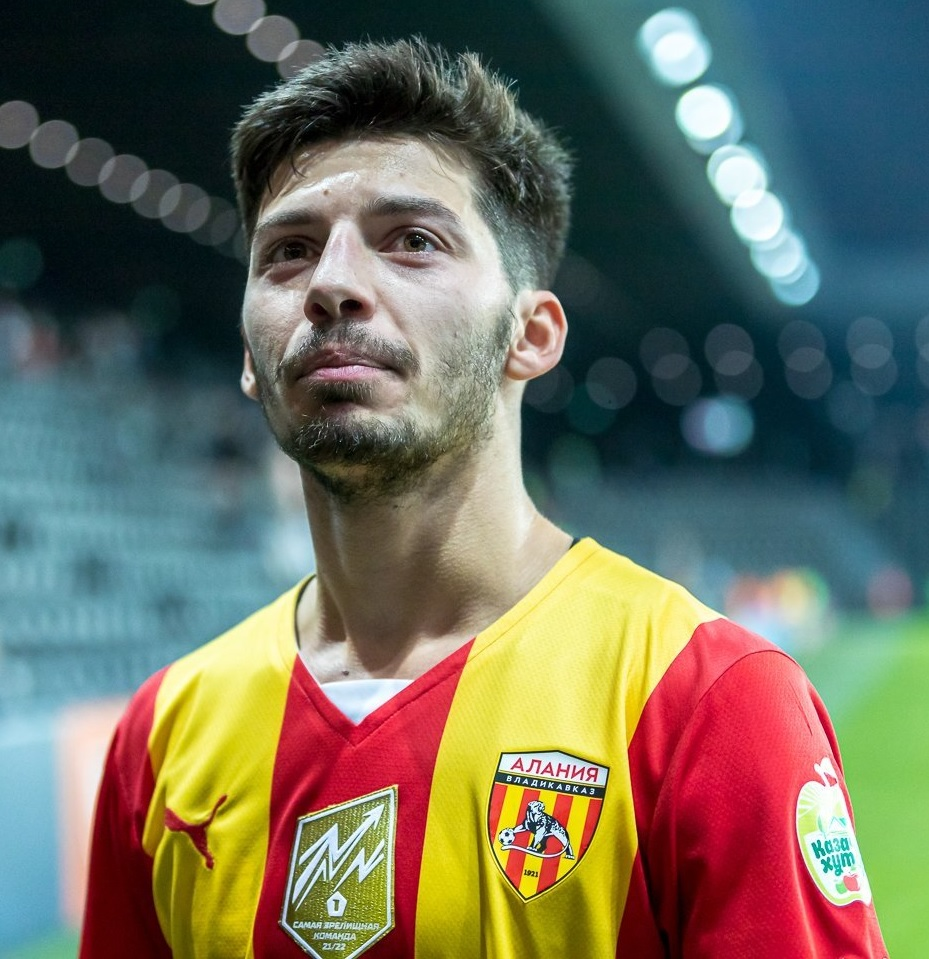
- Giorgobiani with Alania Vladikavkaz in 2020

Personal information
- Full name: Nikolai Badriyevich Giorgobiani
- Date of birth: 16 July 1997 (age 29)
- Place of birth: Sochi, Russia
- Height: 1.74 m (5 ft 9 in)
- Position: Attacking midfielder

Team information
- Current team: Fakel Voronezh
- Number: 99

Youth career
- Barcelona Soccer Academy

Senior career*
Years	Team	Apps	(Gls)
2016–2017	Sochi	24	(3)
2017–2018	Armavir	31	(5)
2018–2019	Chayka Peschanokopskoye	23	(2)
2019–2021	Ufa	18	(1)
2020–2021	→ Alania Vladikavkaz (loan)	25	(1)
2021–2024	Alania Vladikavkaz	88	(25)
2024–	Fakel Voronezh	56	(6)
- * Club domestic league appearances and goals as of 31 October 2026

Nikolai Badriyevich Giorgobiani (Russian: Николай Бадриевич Гиоргобиани; born 16 July 1997) is a Russian football player who plays as an attacking midfielder for Fakel Voronezh.

== Club career ==
He made his debut in the Russian Professional Football League for Sochi on 29 July 2016 in a game against Krasnodar-2.

On 28 June 2019, he signed a long-term contract with the Russian Premier League club Ufa.

He made his debut in the Russian Premier League for Ufa on 13 July 2019 in a game against Ural Yekaterinburg, as a 79th-minute substitute for Azer Aliyev.

On 17 October 2020, he was loaned to Alania Vladikavkaz for the rest of the season. On 9 June 2021, Alania exercised a purchase option in the loan contract and Giorgobiani signed a 3-year contract with the club.

On 6 July 2024, Giorgobiani joined Russian Premier League club Fakel Voronezh.

== Career statistics ==
As of match played 31 October 2026

Appearances and goals by club, season and competition
Club	Season	League			Cup		Total	
Club	Season	Division	Apps	Goals	Apps	Goals	Apps	Goals
Sochi	2016–17	Russian Second League	24	3	0	0	24	3
Armavir	2017–18	Russian Second League	31	5	2	0	33	5
Chayka Peschanokopskoye	2018–19	Russian Second League	23	2	3	1	26	3
Ufa	2019–20	Russian Premier League	14	1	1	0	15	1
Ufa	2020–21	Russian Premier League	4	0	1	0	5	0
Ufa	Total		18	1	2	0	20	1
Alania Vladikavkaz (loan)	2020–21	Russian First League	25	1	—		25	1
Alania Vladikavkaz	2021–22	Russian First League	34	6	4	1	38	7
Alania Vladikavkaz	2022–23	Russian First League	26	12	1	1	27	13
Alania Vladikavkaz	2023–24	Russian First League	28	7	0	0	28	7
Alania Vladikavkaz	Total		88	25	5	2	93	27
Fakel Voronezh	2024–25	Russian Premier League	16	2	5	0	21	2
Fakel Voronezh	2025–26	Russian First League	29	4	2	1	31	5
Fakel Voronezh	2026–27	Russian Premier League	11	0	4	0	15	0
Fakel Voronezh	Total		56	6	11	1	67	7
Career total			236	39	21	3	257	42

== Honours ==
=== Individual ===
- Russian Professional Football League Zone South best young player (2018–19).
