= 2024–25 Russian Second League Division A =

Russian Second League Division A
- Season: 2024–25
- Dates: 21 July 2024 – 28 June 2025
- Promoted: Spartak Kostroma; Volga Ulyanovsk; Chelyabinsk
- Relegated: Dynamo Bryansk; Khimik Dzerzhinsk; Metallurg Lipetsk; Krasnodar-2

The 2024–25 Russian Second League Division A was the 33rd season of Russia's third-tier football league since the dissolution of the Soviet Union. The season began on 21 July 2024 and ended on 28 June 2025.

== Overview ==
Before the 2023–24 season, the Russian Second League was reorganized and split into two tiers - third-tier Russian Second League Division A and fourth-tier Russian Second League Division B.

Division A consists of two groups of 10 teams each.

The Gold Group initially included:

- 3 teams relegated from the 2023–24 Russian First League (FC Leningradets Leningrad Oblast, FC Volgar Astrakhan and FC Kuban Krasnodar)
- 3 teams from the Top 6 of the 2023–24 Second stage Gold Group that were not promoted to the Russian First League (including FC Novosibirsk, who were renamed to FC Sibir Novosibirsk)
- Top 4 teams from the 2023–24 Second stage Silver Group

The Silver Group included:

- Bottom 4 teams from the 2023–24 Second stage Gold Group.
- Bottom 6 teams from the 2023–24 Second stage Silver Group.

In the first part of the season (summer/autumn 2024), each team in the Gold and Silver groups played each other team in the same group twice, home-and-away, for 18 games in total for each team.

For the second part of the season (spring/summer 2025), groups were re-constituted.

Top 6 teams of the First stage Gold Group and top 4 teams of the First stage Silver Group qualified for the Second stage Gold Group. Bottom 4 teams of the First stage Gold Group were moved to the Second stage Silver Group.

Bottom 2 teams of the First stage Silver Group were automatically relegated to the 2025 Division B. Four winners of the 2024 Division B zones (FC Forte Taganrog, FC Dynamo-2 Moscow, FC Dynamo Vladivostok and FC Dynamo Kirov) were promoted to the Second stage Silver Group.

Teams that finish 7th and 8th in the First stage Silver Group would qualify for the relegation play-offs (two games, home-and-away) against the teams that finished 9th and 10th in the Second stage Silver Group of the 2023–24 Russian Second League Division A (FC Torpedo Miass and FC Dynamo Bryansk). If Torpedo Miass and Dynamo Bryansk finished in 5th and 6th place in the First stage Silver Group, the 5th-placed team would play the 8th-placed team and the 6th-placed team would play the 7th-placed team in the relegation play-offs. If only one team out of Torpedo/Dynamo finished in 5th or 6th place, that team would play in relegation play-offs against the 7th-placed team, and the 8th-placed team would be relegated automatically. If neither Torpedo Miass nor Dynamo Bryansk finished in 5th or 6th place, the relegation play-offs would not be held, and the 7th and 8th-placed teams would be relegated automatically. The losers of the relegation play-offs would be relegated to the 2025 Division B, the winners would be included in the Second stage Silver Group. Torpedo Miass secured a top-4 finish and a direct relegation for the 8th-placed team with 3 games left to play. Dynamo Bryansk finished 5th and faced 7th-placed FC Irtysh Omsk in the relegation play-offs.

The teams in re-constituted groups played each other twice more for 18 more games. Top 2 Gold Group teams at the end of the season will be promoted to the Russian First League for the 2025–26 season.

The 3rd-placed Second stage Gold Group team qualifies to play in promotion play-offs (two games, home-and-away) against one of top-3 First stage Gold Group teams, conditional on the performance of those top-3 teams in the second stage.

The 2nd-placed First stage Gold Group team, FC Spartak Kostroma, secured a top 2 finish in the second stage on 28 May 2025 and was not a potential play-off candidate anymore.

The 1st-placed First stage Gold Group team, FC Chelyabinsk, secured a position from 3rd to 6th place on 8 June 2025. If they finished in 3rd place, they would be promoted automatically. If they finished below the 3rd place, they would be the second participant of the promotion play-offs. The winner of those play-offs would also be promoted to the Russian First League.

On the last match day on 14 June 2025, Chelyabinsk was playing FC Mashuk-KMV Pyatigorsk, which never applied for the 2025–26 Russian First League license. In case of Chelyabinsk victory, they would have secured 3rd place and an automatic promotion. In case of a draw, the 3rd place would be taken by FC Volgar Astrakhan or FC Leningradets Leningrad Oblast, both of which did apply for the license and would play Chelyabinsk in the play-offs in this scenario. In case of Mashuk-KMV victory, Mashuk-KMV would have secured the 3rd place, but Chelyabinsk could hypothetically receive an automatic promotion in this case, as Mashuk-KMV would not be eligible for the play-offs due to the lack of license. After Mashuk-KMV scored a go-ahead goal to make the score 2–1 in their favour in the 79th minute, Chelyabinsk started time wasting despite being behind, as the loss was preferable to a draw to them. The game ended with Mashuk-KMV's 2–1 victory. The promotion decision had to be made by the Russian Football Union. On 18 June 2025, RFU decided that Volgar would play Chelyabinsk in the play-offs.

The bottom four teams in the Gold Group at the end of the season were moved to Silver Group for the 2025–26 season, and the top four teams in the Silver Group were moved to Gold Group. The bottom two teams in the Silver Group qualified for the 2025–26 relegation play-offs.

The rotation between Division A and Division B will be happening in the winter going forward, as Division B switched to spring-to-autumn, March-to-November cycle for their seasons. There was no relegation from Division A or promotion to it immediately at the end of the 2024–25 season.

== First stage ==
=== Gold Group ===
Pos	Team	Pld	W	D	L	GF	GA	GD	Pts	Qualification or relegation
1	Chelyabinsk	18	10	5	3	27	18	+9	35	Qualification for the Second Stage Gold Group
2	Spartak Kostroma	18	9	5	4	22	16	+6	32	Qualification for the Second Stage Gold Group
3	Leningradets	18	6	10	2	26	18	+8	28	Qualification for the Second Stage Gold Group
4	Kuban Krasnodar	18	7	5	6	21	24	−3	26	Qualification for the Second Stage Gold Group
5	Volgar Astrakhan	18	6	7	5	21	15	+6	25	Qualification for the Second Stage Gold Group
6	Veles Moscow	18	6	6	6	24	22	+2	24	Qualification for the Second Stage Gold Group
7	Avangard Kursk	18	5	7	6	24	22	+2	22	Qualification for the Second Stage Silver Group
8	Sibir Novosibirsk	18	5	6	7	18	21	−3	21	Qualification for the Second Stage Silver Group
9	Tekstilshchik Ivanovo	18	3	7	8	19	27	−8	16	Qualification for the Second Stage Silver Group
10	Kaluga	18	1	6	11	17	36	−19	9	Qualification for the Second Stage Silver Group

Source: Second League Division A (in Russian), Soccerway

==== Top goalscorers ====
Rank	Player	Club	Goals
1	Vladimir Azarov	Tekstilshchik	6
1	Ivan Matyushenko	Avangard	6
3	Yevgeny Mukhin	Avangard	5
3	Bogdan Reykhmen	Kuban	5
3	Artyom Pogosov	Volgar	5
3	Ilya Rubtsov	Spartak	5
3	Maksim Chikanchi	Spartak	5

=== Silver Group ===
Pos	Team	Pld	W	D	L	GF	GA	GD	Pts	Qualification or relegation
1	Rodina-2 Moscow	18	10	5	3	39	22	+17	35	Qualification for the Second Stage Gold Group
2	Volga Ulyanovsk	18	10	5	3	32	18	+14	35	Qualification for the Second Stage Gold Group
3	Torpedo Miass	18	9	5	4	19	16	+3	32	Qualification for the Second Stage Gold Group
4	Mashuk-KMV Pyatigorsk	18	6	7	5	23	22	+1	25	Qualification for the Second Stage Gold Group
5	Dynamo Bryansk (Note: Dynamo Bryansk qualified for relegation play-offs as a 10th-placed team in the 2023–24 Second Stage Silver Group)	18	5	7	6	22	21	+1	22	Qualification for the 2024 relegation play-offs
6	Murom	18	6	4	8	18	24	−6	22	Qualification for the Second Stage Silver Group
7	Irtysh Omsk	18	6	3	9	19	28	−9	21	Qualification for the 2024 relegation play-offs
8	Khimik Dzerzhinsk	18	5	4	9	22	30	−8	19	Relegation to the 2025 Division B (Note: Since Torpedo Miass (9th in the 2023–24 Second Stage Silver Group) secured a position in the Top 4, the 8th-placed team was relegated directly)
9	Metallurg Lipetsk	18	4	5	9	22	26	−4	17	Relegation to the 2025 Division B
10	Krasnodar-2 (Note: Krasnodar-2 was suspended by their parent club at the end of the season.)	18	3	7	8	24	33	−9	16	Dissolved after the season

Source: Second League Division A (in Russian), Soccerway

==== Top goalscorers ====
Rank	Player	Club	Goals
1	Magomedkhabib Abdusalamov	Rodina-2	8
1	Dmitri Kamenshchikov	Volga	8
3	Danila Shilov	Rodina-2	7
3	Anzor Khutov	Mashuk-KMV	7
5	Artyom Kotik	Murom	6
6	Denis Mikhaylov	Murom	5
6	Anton Roshchin	Metallurg	5
6	Matvey Burlakov	Rodina-2	5
6	Aznaur Geryugov	Irtysh	5

== Relegation play-offs ==
The draw for the host team for the first leg was held on 14 November 2024.

=== First leg ===
20 November 2024
14:00

Dynamo Bryansk	0–0	Irtysh Omsk
	Report	Lobanov (yellow card) 42'; Yanushkovsky (yellow card) 64'; Matyunin (yellow card) 71'; Ivankov (yellow card) 90+'

Dynamo Stadium, Bryansk
Attendance: 852
Referee: Yury Matveyev

=== Second leg ===
24 November 2024
14:00 (17:00 OMST)

Irtysh Omsk	2–0	Dynamo Bryansk
Geryugov (yellow card) 22' (goal) 45' (pen.); Galadzhan 47'; Shcherbakov (yellow card) 50'; Karev (yellow card) 65'; Larin (yellow card) 76'; Yanchenko (yellow card) 84'; Matyunin (yellow card) 90+'	Report	Badrtdinov (yellow card) 24'; Drogunov (yellow card) 45'; Frolov (yellow card) 56'; Osipov (yellow card) 74'

Red Star Indoor Stadium, Omsk
Attendance: 1,895
Referee: Kirill Silantyev

Irtysh Omsk won 2–0 on aggregate and remained in Division A Silver Group, Dynamo Bryansk was relegated to Second League Division B.

== Second stage ==
=== Gold Group ===
Pos	Team	Pld	W	D	L	GF	GA	GD	Pts	Qualification or relegation
1	Spartak Kostroma (P)	18	11	3	4	30	15	+15	36	Promotion to the Russian First League
2	Volga Ulyanovsk (P)	18	9	7	2	32	15	+17	34	Promotion to the Russian First League
3	Mashuk-KMV Pyatigorsk (Note: Mashuk did not apply for the 2025–26 Russian First League license and was therefore not eligible for the promotion play-offs. Chelyabinsk qualified for the play-offs by finishing 1st in the First Stage. As this situation is not explicitly covered by the regulations, Russian Football Union decided that Volgar will play Chelyabinsk in the play-offs.)	18	6	9	3	21	13	+8	27	
4	Volgar Astrakhan	18	7	6	5	18	18	0	27	Qualification for the promotion play-offs
5	Leningradets	18	7	6	5	20	20	0	27	
6	Chelyabinsk (O, P)	18	8	2	8	18	22	−4	26	Qualification for the promotion play-offs
7	Veles Moscow (Note: Veles was kept in the Gold Group as a consequence of Khimki dissolution after the season. Because Khimki did not take up their First League spot, only two teams were relegated from the First League, and three promoted to it from Second League Division A.)	18	7	3	8	22	21	+1	24	
8	Kuban Krasnodar	18	5	2	11	14	28	−14	17	Qualification for the 2025–26 First Stage Silver Group
9	Rodina-2 Moscow	18	4	4	10	13	22	−9	16	Qualification for the 2025–26 First Stage Silver Group
10	Torpedo Miass	18	2	6	10	8	22	−14	12	Qualification for the 2025–26 First Stage Silver Group

Source: Second League Division A (in Russian), Soccerway
(O) Play-off winners; (P) Promoted

==== Top goalscorers ====
Rank	Player	Club	Goals
1	Dmitri Kamenshchikov	Volga	8
2	Ilya Rubtsov	Spartak	7
3	Aleksandr Saplinov	Spartak	6
4	Denis Mironov	Volgar	5
4	Anzor Khutov	Mashuk-KMV	5

=== Silver Group ===
Pos	Team	Pld	W	D	L	GF	GA	GD	Pts	Qualification or relegation
1	Tekstilshchik Ivanovo	18	12	2	4	31	14	+17	38	Qualification for the 2025–26 First Stage Gold Group
2	Sibir Novosibirsk	18	11	2	5	36	16	+20	35	Qualification for the 2025–26 First Stage Gold Group
3	Dynamo Kirov	18	9	4	5	23	17	+6	31	Qualification for the 2025–26 First Stage Gold Group
4	Dynamo-2 Moscow	18	8	2	8	23	24	−1	26	Qualification for the 2025–26 First Stage Gold Group
5	Kaluga	18	7	5	6	21	17	+4	26	
6	Dynamo Vladivostok	18	5	8	5	18	17	+1	23	
7	Avangard Kursk	18	5	5	8	15	24	−9	20	
8	Irtysh Omsk	18	5	5	8	13	20	−7	20	
9	Murom	18	4	4	10	16	30	−14	16	Qualification for the 2025 relegation play-offs
10	Forte Taganrog (Note: Forte Taganrog was dissolved at the conclusion of the season.)	18	3	5	10	16	33	−17	14	Dissolved after the season

Source: Second League Division A (in Russian), Soccerway

==== Top goalscorers ====
Rank	Player	Club	Goals
1	Daniil Agureyev	Kaluga	8
2	Vladimir Azarov	Tekstilshchik	5
2	Gleb Bakharev	Sibir	5
2	Karim Girayev	Murom	5
2	Beka Dzhanelidze	Dynamo Vladivostok	5
2	Artur Maksimchuk	Kaluga	5
2	Timur Melekestsev	Forte	5
2	Aleksei Skvortsov	Tekstilshchik	5
2	Yevgeni Tatarinov	Sibir	5
2	Dmitry Usov	Dynamo Kirov	5
2	Aleksandr Khubulov	Dynamo-2	5

== Promotion play-offs ==
=== First leg ===
24 June 2025
18:00 (19:00 SAMT)

Volgar Astrakhan	1–1	Chelyabinsk
Pogosov 47'; Mironov (yellow card) 53'	Report	Nosov 18'; Kertanov (yellow card) 26'; Sugrobov (yellow card) 86'; Gudkov (yellow card) 88'

Central Stadium, Astrakhan
Attendance: 10,725
Referee: Danil Kashirin (Ufa)

=== Second leg ===
28 June 2025
15:00 (17:00 YEKT)

Chelyabinsk	0–0 (a.e.t.)	Volgar Astrakhan
Kertanov (yellow card) 65'; Rogochy (yellow card) 79'	Report	Proshkin (yellow card) 62'; Galanin (yellow card) 66'; Yampolsky (yellow card) 86'; Pavlishin (yellow card) 90'; Zuykov (yellow card) 96'
Penalties
Sokolov (penalty scored); Ulyanovsky (penalty scored); Levin (penalty scored); Pokotylo (penalty scored)	4–2	Lesnikov (penalty missed); Matyushenko (penalty scored); Dmitriyev (penalty scored); Zuykov (penalty missed)

Central Stadium, Chelyabinsk
Attendance: 5,078
Referee: Andrey Prokopov (Yaroslavl)

1–1 on aggregate, Chelyabinsk won 4–2 in the penalty shoot-out and was promoted to the First League.
