= 2023–24 Russian Second League Division A =

Russian Second League Division A
- Season: 2023–24
- Dates: 16 July 2023 – 16 June 2024
- Promoted: Ufa; Chayka; Rotor Volgograd
- Relegated: Forte Taganrog; Amkar Perm; Chertanovo Moscow; Salyut Belgorod relegation happens mid-season

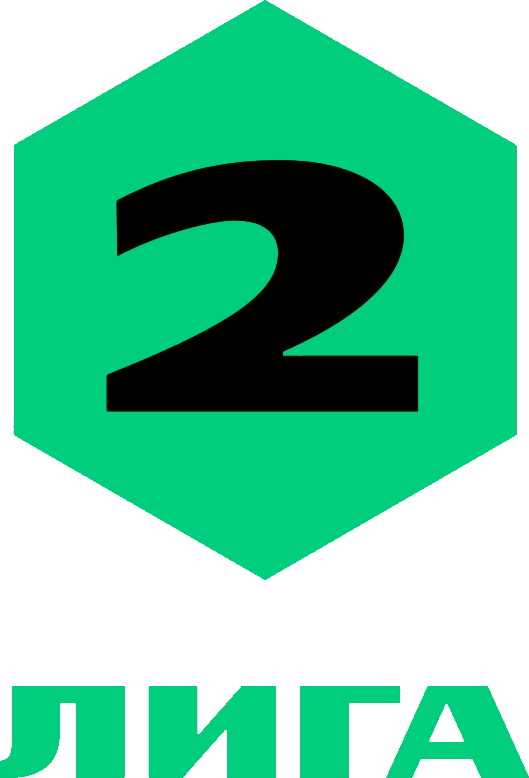
2nd League in Russia Logo, 2022

The 2023–24 Russian Second League Division A was the 32nd season of Russia's third-tier football league since the dissolution of the Soviet Union. The season began on 16 July 2023 and ended on 16 June 2024.

== Overview ==
Before the season, the Russian Second League was reorganized and split into two tiers - third-tier Russian Second League Division A and fourth-tier Russian Second League Division B.

Division A consists of two groups of 10 teams each. The Gold Group initially included:

- 4 teams relegated from the 2022–23 Russian First League (FC Veles Moscow, FC Ufa, FC Krasnodar-2 and FC Volga Ulyanovsk)
- 4 teams that came in 2nd place in their zones of the 2022–23 Russian Second League (FC Chayka Peschanokopskoye, FC Murom, FC Dynamo Bryansk and FC Irtysh Omsk)
- 2 best 3rd-placed 2022–23 Second League teams (FC Rotor Volgograd and FC Spartak Kostroma);

The Silver Group included:

- 2 worst 3rd-placed 2022–23 teams (FC Rodina-2 Moscow and FC Amkar Perm)
- 7 4th- and 5th-placed 2022–23 teams (FC Avangard Kursk, FC Chelyabinsk, FC Chertanovo Moscow, FC Forte Taganrog, FC Novosibirsk, FC Salyut Belgorod, FC Tekstilshchik Ivanovo).

FC Kuban-Holding Pavlovskaya (which came in 5th place in Group 1 in 2022–23 and was thus eligible for the Silver Group) chose to enter Second League Division B instead. FC Biolog-Novokubansk, which came in 6th place in Group 1, made the same decision. The vacant Silver Group spot was taken by FC Metallurg Lipetsk which came in 6th place in their group in 2022–23.

In the first part of the season (summer/autumn 2023), each team in the Gold and Silver groups played each other team in the same group twice, home-and-away, for 18 games in total for each team. For the second part of the season (spring/summer 2024), groups were re-constituted. The Gold Group now includes top 6 first-stage Gold Group teams and top 4 first-stage Silver Group teams. Silver Group includes bottom 4 first-stage Gold Group teams, 5th and 6th-placed first-stage Silver Group teams and four winners of the Division B groups (FC Mashuk-KMV Pyatigorsk, FC Khimik Dzerzhinsk, FC Kaluga and FC Torpedo Miass). Bottom 4 first-stage Silver Group teams were relegated to Division B for 2024. The teams in re-constituted groups will play each other twice more for 18 more games. Top 2 Gold Group teams at the end of the season will be promoted to the Russian First League for the 2024–25 season.

The 3rd-placed second-stage Gold Group team played in promotion play-offs (two games, home-and-away). Their potential opponents were:

1. The 1st-placed first-stage Gold Group team (FC Krasnodar-2), unless Krasnodar-2 finished in the Top 2 or in the bottom 4 in the second stage (Krasnodar-2 finished in the bottom 4 in the second stage); otherwise
2. The 2nd-placed first-stage Gold Group team (FC Ufa), unless Ufa finished in the Top 2 or in the bottom 4 in the second stage (Ufa finished 1st in the second stage); otherwise
3. The 3rd-placed first-stage Gold Group team (FC Rotor Volgograd), unless Rotor Volgograd finished in the Top 2 or in the bottom 4 in the second stage.

The winner of those play-offs was also promoted to the Russian First League.

If none of the top-3 first-stage Gold Group teams qualified for the promotion play-offs under the conditions described above, the play-offs would not be held and the 3rd-place second-stage Gold Group team would be promoted to the Russian First League automatically.

The bottom four teams in the Gold Group at the end of the season were moved to Silver Group for the 2024–25 season, and the top four teams in the Silver Group were moved to Gold Group.

The rotation between Division A and Division B will be happening in the winter going forward, as Division B switched to spring-to-autumn, March-to-November cycle for their seasons. For example, in November 2024, bottom 2 teams of Division A Silver Group standings at the time would be relegated to 2025 Division B directly, 7th and 8th-placed teams in Division A Silver Group will play in relegation play-offs against the bottom two teams of the 2023–24 Division A Silver Group season, with 2 losers of the playoffs also relegated to Division B. Winners of the 2024 Division B groups will be promoted to Division A Silver Group at that time. Therefore, there was no relegation from Division A or promotion to it immediately at the end of the 2023–24 season.

== First stage ==
=== Gold Group ===
| Pos | Team | Pld | W | D | L | GF | GA | GD | Pts | Qualification or relegation |
|---|---|---|---|---|---|---|---|---|---|---|
| 1 | Krasnodar-2 | 18 | 9 | 6 | 3 | 27 | 20 | +7 | 33 | Qualification for the Second Stage Gold Group |
| 2 | Ufa | 18 | 9 | 4 | 5 | 23 | 10 | +13 | 31 | Qualification for the Second Stage Gold Group |
| 3 | Rotor Volgograd | 18 | 7 | 7 | 4 | 21 | 17 | +4 | 28 | Qualification for the Second Stage Gold Group |
| 4 | Murom | 18 | 6 | 6 | 6 | 24 | 26 | −2 | 24 | Qualification for the Second Stage Gold Group |
| 5 | Veles Moscow | 18 | 6 | 6 | 6 | 16 | 21 | −5 | 24 | Qualification for the Second Stage Gold Group |
| 6 | Chayka Peschanokopskoye | 18 | 6 | 5 | 7 | 23 | 21 | +2 | 23 | Qualification for the Second Stage Gold Group |
| 7 | Volga Ulyanovsk | 18 | 6 | 5 | 7 | 15 | 18 | −3 | 23 | Qualification for the Second Stage Silver Group |
| 8 | Irtysh Omsk | 18 | 6 | 5 | 7 | 15 | 15 | 0 | 23 | Qualification for the Second Stage Silver Group |
| 9 | Dynamo Bryansk | 18 | 6 | 4 | 8 | 18 | 22 | −4 | 22 | Qualification for the Second Stage Silver Group |
| 10 | Spartak Kostroma | 18 | 3 | 4 | 11 | 13 | 25 | −12 | 13 | Qualification for the Second Stage Silver Group |

Source: Second League Division A (in Russian), Soccerway

=== Top goalscorers ===
| Rank | Player | Club | Goals |
|---|---|---|---|
| 1 | Ilya Azyavin | Murom | 9 |
| 2 | Pavel Dolgov | Chayka Peschanokopskoye | 7 |
| 2 | Daniil Agureyev | Murom | 7 |
| 4 | Daniil Arsentyev | Rotor Volgograd | 5 |
| 4 | Dmitry Kuptsov | Dynamo Bryansk | 5 |
| 4 | Kamil Mullin | Krasnodar-2 | 5 |
| 4 | Migran Ageyan | Ufa | 5 |
| 4 | Gevork Sarkisyan | Veles Moscow | 5 |
| 4 | Andrei Razborov | Irtysh Omsk | 5 |
| 4 | Danil Karpov | Krasnodar-2 | 5 |

=== Silver Group ===
| Pos | Team | Pld | W | D | L | GF | GA | GD | Pts | Qualification or relegation |
|---|---|---|---|---|---|---|---|---|---|---|
| 1 | Novosibirsk | 18 | 10 | 5 | 3 | 22 | 13 | +9 | 35 | Qualification for the Second Stage Gold Group |
| 2 | Rodina-2 Moscow | 18 | 9 | 5 | 4 | 17 | 13 | +4 | 32 | Qualification for the Second Stage Gold Group |
| 3 | Metallurg Lipetsk | 18 | 7 | 6 | 5 | 19 | 20 | −1 | 27 | Qualification for the Second Stage Gold Group |
| 4 | Chelyabinsk | 18 | 7 | 5 | 6 | 19 | 16 | +3 | 26 | Qualification for the Second Stage Gold Group |
| 5 | Tekstilshchik Ivanovo | 18 | 6 | 7 | 5 | 25 | 18 | +7 | 25 | Qualification for the Second Stage Silver Group |
| 6 | Avangard Kursk | 18 | 7 | 4 | 7 | 27 | 19 | +8 | 25 | Qualification for the Second Stage Silver Group |
| 7 | Forte Taganrog | 18 | 7 | 3 | 8 | 24 | 27 | −3 | 24 | Relegation to the 2024 Division B |
| 8 | Amkar Perm | 18 | 6 | 6 | 6 | 19 | 17 | +2 | 24 | Relegation to the 2024 Division B |
| 9 | Chertanovo Moscow | 18 | 5 | 7 | 6 | 21 | 18 | +3 | 22 | Relegation to the 2024 Division B |
| 10 | Salyut Belgorod | 18 | 1 | 2 | 15 | 14 | 46 | −32 | 5 | Relegation to the 2024 Division B |

Source: Second League Division A (in Russian), Soccerway

=== Top goalscorers ===
| Rank | Player | Club | Goals |
|---|---|---|---|
| 1 | Denis Syomin | Metallurg Lipetsk | 7 |
| 1 | Dmitri Lavrishchev | Rotor Volgograd | 7 |
| 1 | Yevgeny Mukhin | Rotor Volgograd | 7 |
| 4 | Aleksey Yevseyev | Tekstilshchik Ivanovo | 6 |
| 4 | Aleksei Skvortsov | Tekstilshchik Ivanovo | 6 |
| 6 | Artur Maksimchuk | Metallurg Lipetsk | 5 |
| 6 | Igor Gershun | Avangard Kursk | 5 |
| 8 | Artur Arustamyan | Metallurg Lipetsk | 4 |
| 8 | Pyotr Volodkin | Forte Taganrog | 4 |
| 8 | Pavel Popov | Chertanovo Moscow | 4 |

== Second stage ==
=== Gold Group ===
| Pos | Team | Pld | W | D | L | GF | GA | GD | Pts | Qualification or relegation |
|---|---|---|---|---|---|---|---|---|---|---|
| 1 | Ufa (Note: Ufa has been denied the 2024–25 First League license by the Russian Football Union initially, but received it on appeal on 4 June 2024.) (P) | 18 | 9 | 6 | 3 | 26 | 9 | +17 | 33 | Promotion to the Russian First League |
| 2 | Chayka Peschanokopskoye (P) | 18 | 8 | 7 | 3 | 25 | 17 | +8 | 31 | Promotion to the Russian First League |
| 3 | Novosibirsk (Q) | 18 | 6 | 9 | 3 | 18 | 13 | +5 | 27 | Qualification for the promotion play-offs |
| 4 | Chelyabinsk | 18 | 6 | 7 | 5 | 23 | 19 | +4 | 25 (Note: Points in head-to-head games: Chelyabinsk 7, Rotor Volgograd 6, Veles Moscow 3.) | |
| 5 | Rotor Volgograd (Note: Since Krasnodar-2 (1st in the first stage) finished in bottom 4 in the second stage, and Ufa (2nd in the first stage), was directly promoted, the spot for promotion play-offs was given to 3rd team of the first stage, Rotor Volgograd.) (Q) | 18 | 7 | 4 | 7 | 20 | 20 | 0 | 25 | Qualification for the promotion play-offs |
| 6 | Veles Moscow | 18 | 7 | 4 | 7 | 15 | 16 | −1 | 25 | |
| 7 | Krasnodar-2 (Q) | 18 | 5 | 6 | 7 | 15 | 24 | −9 | 21 | Qualification for the 2024–25 First Stage Silver Group |
| 8 | Rodina-2 Moscow (Q) | 18 | 5 | 5 | 8 | 25 | 23 | +2 | 20 (Note: Goals difference in head-to-head games: Rodina-2 5-2 Murom, Murom 1-0 Rodina-2) | Qualification for the 2024–25 First Stage Silver Group |
| 9 | Murom (Q) | 18 | 5 | 5 | 8 | 20 | 27 | −7 | 20 | Qualification for the 2024–25 First Stage Silver Group |
| 10 | Metallurg Lipetsk (Q) | 18 | 3 | 5 | 10 | 9 | 28 | −19 | 14 | Qualification for the 2024–25 First Stage Silver Group |

Source: Second League Division A (in Russian), Soccerway
(P) Promoted; (Q) Qualified for the phase indicated

=== Top goalscorers ===
| Rank | Player | Club | Goals |
|---|---|---|---|
| 1 | Ilya Azyavin | Murom | 10 |
| 2 | Pavel Dolgov | Chayka Peschanokopskoye | 9 |
| 3 | Roman Pasevich | Ufa | 6 |
| 4 | Valery Gorbachik | Chelyabinsk | 5 |
| 4 | Danila Shilov | Rodina-2 Moscow | 5 |
| 4 | Aleksandr Konev | Novosibirsk | 5 |
| 4 | Aleksandr Khokhlachyov | Chayka Peschanokopskoye | 5 |
| 4 | Ramazan Gadzhimuradov | Rotor Volgograd | 5 |
| 9 | Valery Solomakha | Rodina-2 Moscow | 4 |
| 9 | Stanislav Biblyk | Chelyabinsk | 4 |

=== Silver Group ===
| Pos | Team | Pld | W | D | L | GF | GA | GD | Pts | Qualification or relegation |
|---|---|---|---|---|---|---|---|---|---|---|
| 1 | Spartak Kostroma | 18 | 10 | 5 | 3 | 24 | 9 | +15 | 35 | Qualification for the 2024–25 First Stage Gold Group |
| 2 | Tekstilshchik Ivanovo | 18 | 6 | 10 | 2 | 17 | 13 | +4 | 28 | Qualification for the 2024–25 First Stage Gold Group |
| 3 | Kaluga | 18 | 7 | 6 | 5 | 30 | 26 | +4 | 27 | Qualification for the 2024–25 First Stage Gold Group |
| 4 | Avangard Kursk | 18 | 8 | 3 | 7 | 18 | 19 | −1 | 27 | Qualification for the 2024–25 First Stage Gold Group |
| 5 | Irtysh Omsk | 18 | 6 | 8 | 4 | 18 | 16 | +2 | 26 | |
| 6 | Volga Ulyanovsk | 18 | 6 | 5 | 7 | 24 | 15 | +9 | 23 | |
| 7 | Mashuk-KMV Pyatigorsk | 18 | 6 | 4 | 8 | 14 | 20 | −6 | 22 | |
| 8 | Khimik Dzerzhinsk | 18 | 5 | 6 | 7 | 17 | 23 | −6 | 21 | |
| 9 | Torpedo Miass (Note: Torpedo Miass secured a top 4 position in the 2024–25 Silver Group First Stage tournament and will not participate in the 2024 relegation play-offs.) | 18 | 4 | 5 | 9 | 16 | 26 | −10 | 17 | |
| 10 | Dynamo Bryansk | 18 | 3 | 6 | 9 | 18 | 29 | −11 | 15 | Qualification for the 2024 relegation play-offs |

Source: Second League Division A (in Russian), Soccerway

=== Top goalscorers ===
| Rank | Player | Club | Goals |
|---|---|---|---|
| 1 | Aleksei Skvortsov | Tekstilshchik Ivanovo | 7 |
| 2 | Dmitri Zakharov | Kaluga | 6 |
| 2 | Vladislav Shpitalny | Torpedo Miass | 6 |
| 2 | Vladislav Ignatenko | Avangard Kursk | 6 |
| 2 | Timur Abdrashitov | Kaluga | 6 |
| 6 | Yevgeni Voronin | Volga Ulyanovsk | 5 |
| 7 | Ivan Kozlov | Kaluga | 4 |
| 7 | Mikhail Markin | Spartak Kostroma | 4 |
| 7 | Aleksandr Saplinov | Spartak Kostroma | 4 |
| 7 | Anzor Khutov | Mashuk-KMV Pyatigorsk | 4 |

== Promotion play-offs ==
=== First leg ===
12 June 2024
13:00 (17:00 KRAT)

| Novosibirsk | 1–1 | Rotor Volgograd |
|---|---|---|
| Yerokhin (yellow card) 13'; Rozhkov 79' | Report | Safronov (yellow card) 81'; Ageyev 87'; Shilnikov (yellow card) 90+' |

Zarya Stadium, Novosibirsk
Attendance: 2,017
Referee: Inal Tanashev

=== Second leg ===
16 June 2024
19:00

| Rotor Volgograd | 3–1 | Novosibirsk |
|---|---|---|
| Safronov 5', 31', 90' | Report | Yerokhin 11'; Bammatgereyev (yellow card) 30'; Karayev (yellow card) 83' |

Volgograd Arena, Volgograd
Attendance: 27,014
Referee: Yegor Yegorov

Rotor Volgograd won 4–2 on aggregate and was promoted to the First League, Novosibirsk remained in the Second League Division A Gold Group.
