= Svyatoslav Kozhedub =

Russian footballer (born 2002)

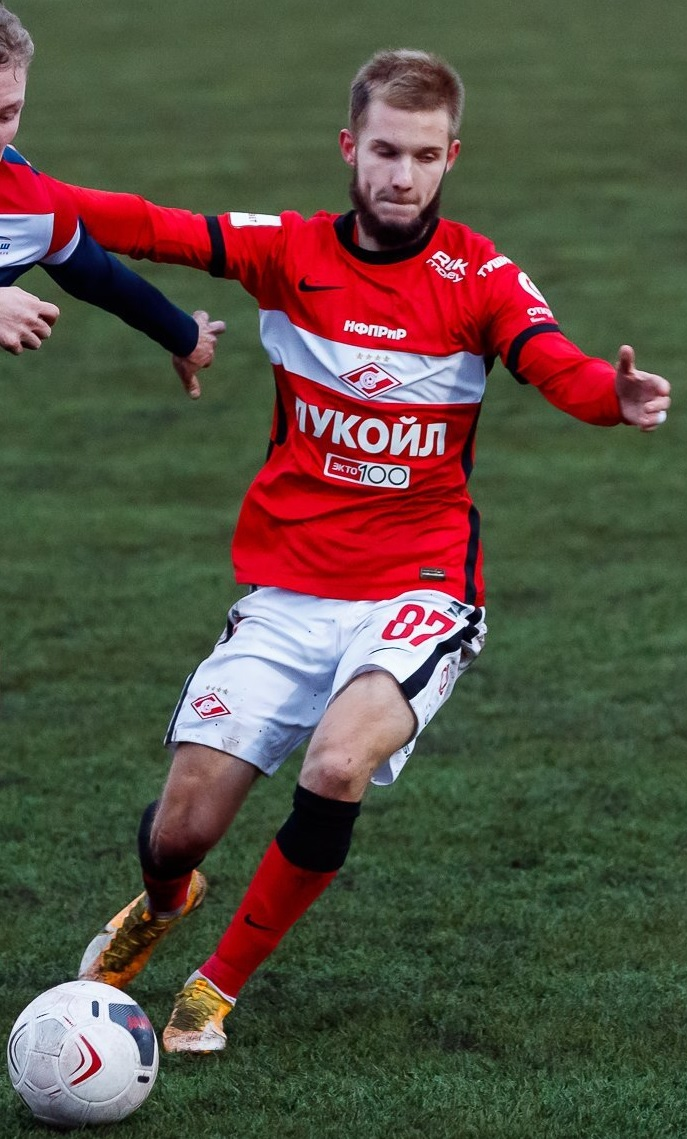
- Kozhedub with Spartak-2 Moscow in 2020

Personal information
- Full name: Svyatoslav Dmitriyevich Kozhedub
- Date of birth: 22 May 2002 (age 24)
- Place of birth: Kostanay, Kazakhstan
- Height: 1.73 m (5 ft 8 in)
- Position: Forward

Youth career
- –2016: Tobol
- 2017: Konoplyov football academy
- 2017–2019: Spartak Moscow

Senior career*
Years	Team	Apps	(Gls)
2019–2022	Spartak Moscow	0	(0)
2020	→ Spartak-2 Moscow	18	(2)
2021	→ Valmiera (loan)	5	(1)
2021–2022	→ Spartak-2 Moscow	1	(0)
2022	Akron Tolyatti	6	(0)
2023–2024	Chayka Peschanokopskoye	39	(6)
2024–2026	Rodina Moscow	14	(0)
2025–2026	Rodina-2 Moscow	17	(1)

International career^{‡}
2017	Russia U-16	4	(0)
2019	Russia U-18	3	(1)
- * Club domestic league appearances and goals as of 13 June 2026 ‡ National team caps and goals as of 18 November 2019

Svyatoslav Dmitriyevich Kozhedub (Russian: Святослав Дмитриевич Кожедуб; born 22 May 2002) is a Russian football player.

== Club career ==
Kozhedub made his debut in the Russian Football National League for Spartak-2 Moscow on 1 August 2020 in a game against Chertanovo Moscow, as a starter.

He made his debut for the main squad of Spartak Moscow on 21 October 2020 in a Russian Cup game against Yenisey Krasnoyarsk.

== Career statistics ==
As of 16 May 2026

Club	Season	League			Cup		Total	
Club	Season	Division	Apps	Goals	Apps	Goals	Apps	Goals
Spartak-2 Moscow	2020–21	Russian First League	18	2	—		18	2
Spartak-2 Moscow	2021–22	Russian First League	1	0	—		1	0
Spartak-2 Moscow	Total		19	2	0	0	19	2
Spartak Moscow	2020–21	Russian Premier League	0	0	1	0	1	0
Valmiera (loan)	2021	Latvian Higher League	4	0	0	0	4	0
Akron Tolyatti	2021–22	Russian First League	5	0	0	0	5	0
Akron Tolyatti	2022–23	Russian First League	1	0	2	1	3	1
Akron Tolyatti	Total		6	0	2	1	8	1
Chayka Peschanokopskoye	2022–23	Russian Second League	9	1	—		9	1
Chayka Peschanokopskoye	2023–24	Russian Second League A	23	4	0	0	23	4
Chayka Peschanokopskoye	2024–25	Russian First League	7	1	0	0	7	1
Chayka Peschanokopskoye	Total		39	6	0	0	39	6
Rodina Moscow	2024–25	Russian First League	12	0	1	0	13	0
Rodina Moscow	2025–26	Russian First League	2	0	1	0	3	0
Rodina Moscow	Total		14	0	2	0	16	0
Rodina-2 Moscow	2024–25	Russian Second League A	2	0	—		2	0
Rodina-2 Moscow	2025–26	Russian Second League A	15	1	—		15	1
Rodina-2 Moscow	Total		17	1	0	0	17	1
Career total			99	9	5	1	104	10
