= 2025–26 Russian Second League Division A =

Russian Second League Division A
- Season: 2025–26
- Dates: 19 July 2025 – June 2026
- Promoted: Leningradets; Tekstilshchik Ivanovo; Veles Moscow

The 2025–26 Russian Second League Division A is the 34th season of Russia's third-tier football league since the dissolution of the Soviet Union. The season began on 19 July 2025 and will end in June 2026.

== Overview ==
Before the 2023–24 season, the Russian Second League was reorganized and split into two tiers - third-tier Russian Second League Division A and fourth-tier Russian Second League Division B.

Division A consists of two groups.

The Gold Group initially included 10 teams:

- 2 teams relegated from the 2024–25 Russian First League (FC Alania Vladikavkaz and FC Tyumen). FC Sokol Saratov, which finished the First League season in the relegation spot, remained in the First League to replace FC Khimki, which was administratively relegated from the Premier League and then dissolved instead of entering the First League.
- 3 teams from the Top 6 of the 2024–25 Second stage Gold Group that were not promoted to the Russian First League.
- FC Veles Moscow, which finished 7th in the 2024–25 Second stage Gold Group and would have been moved to the Silver Group, but was kept in the Gold Group to replace Sokol.
- Top 4 teams from the 2024–25 Second stage Silver Group.

The Silver Group initially included 8 teams (instead of usual 10):

- Bottom 3 teams from the 2024–25 Second stage Gold Group.
- Teams placed 5th to 9th from the 2024–25 Second stage Silver Group.

FC Forte Taganrog, which finished last in the 2024–25 Second stage Silver Group, was dissolved after the season and could not be replaced by a Division B team, as Division B is contested on a March-to-November cycle.

In the first part of the season (summer/autumn 2025), each team in the Gold and Silver groups played each other team in the same group twice, home-and-away, for 18 games (in the Gold Group) and 14 games (in the Silver Group) in total for each team.

For the second part of the season (spring/summer 2026), groups were re-constituted.

Top 6 teams of the First stage Gold Group and top 4 teams of the First stage Silver Group qualified for the Second stage Gold Group. Bottom 4 teams of the First stage Gold Group were moved to the Second stage Silver Group.

The 8th-placed team of the First stage Silver Group was automatically relegated to the 2026 Division B. Four winners of the 2025 Division B groups (Dynamo Stavropol, Zenit-2 St. Petersburg, Dynamo Bryansk and Amkar Perm) will be promoted to the Second stage Silver Group.

Team that finished 7th in the First stage Silver Group would qualify for the relegation play-offs (two games, home-and-away) against the team that finished 9th in the Second stage Silver Group of the 2024–25 Russian Second League Division A, FC Murom. The play-offs would only be held if Murom finished 5th or 6th in the First stage Silver Group. If Murom finished in any other place, the play-offs would not be held, and the 7th-placed team would be relegated automatically. As Murom finished 8th, 7th-placed Avangard was relegated directly.

The teams in re-constituted groups (with Silver Group now containing 10 teams) will play each other twice more for 18 more games. Top 2 Gold Group teams at the end of the season will be promoted to the Russian First League for the 2026–27 season.

The 3rd-placed Second stage Gold Group team will play in promotion play-offs (two games, home-and-away), if they successfully apply for the 2026-27 Russian First League license. Their opponent will be:

1. The 1st-placed First stage Gold Group team, unless that team finishes in the top 2 or in the bottom 4 in the second stage; if 3rd-placed Second stage team was 1st in the First stage, it would get promoted automatically; otherwise
2. The 2nd-placed First stage Gold Group team, unless that team finishes in the top 2 or in the bottom 4 in the second stage; if 3rd-placed Second stage team was 2nd in the First stage, it would get promoted automatically; otherwise
3. The 3rd-placed First stage Gold Group team, unless that team finishes in the top 2 or in the bottom 4 in the second stage; if 3rd-placed Second stage team was 3rd in the First stage, it would get promoted automatically.

If none of the top-3 First stage Gold Group teams qualify for the promotion play-offs under the conditions described above, the play-offs would not be held and the 3rd-place Second stage Gold Group team would be promoted to the Russian First League automatically.

If the 3rd-placed Second stage Gold Group team does not receive the 2026–27 Russian First League license prior to the play-offs, the play-offs will be contended by:

1. The 1st-placed First stage Gold Group team and 2nd-placed First stage Gold Group team, unless either of those teams finish in the top 3 or the bottom 4 in the second stage; otherwise
2. The 1st-placed First stage Gold Group team and 3rd-placed First stage Gold Group team, unless either of those teams finish in the top 3 or the bottom 4 in the second stage; otherwise
3. The 2nd-placed First stage Gold Group team and 3rd-placed First stage Gold Group team, unless either of those teams finish in the top 3 or the bottom 4 in the second stage; otherwise
4. If only one of the top 3 First stage teams finish outside of top 3 and outside of bottom 4 in the second stage, that team will be promoted directly; otherwise
5. If none of the top 3 First stage teams finish outside of top 3 and outside of bottom 4 in the second stage, the highest-placed First League team that would be relegated will remain in the First League

If one or both of the Top 2 Second stage Gold Group teams do not receive the 2026–27 Russian First League license, the play-offs would not be held, and both teams that would otherwise qualify for the play-offs would be promoted automatically.

The bottom four teams in the Gold Group at the end of the season would be moved to Silver Group for the 2026–27 season, and the top four teams in the Silver Group would be moved to Gold Group. The bottom two teams in the Second stage Silver Group would qualify for the 2026 relegation play-offs.

The rotation between Division A and Division B will be happening in the winter going forward, as Division B switched to spring-to-autumn, March-to-November cycle for their seasons. There will no relegation from Division A or promotion to it immediately at the end of the 2025–26 season.

== First stage ==
=== Gold Group ===
Pos	Team	Pld	W	D	L	GF	GA	GD	Pts	Qualification or relegation
1	Veles Moscow	18	9	6	3	26	12	+14	33	Qualification for the Second Stage Gold Group
2	Volgar Astrakhan	18	9	5	4	18	11	+7	32	Qualification for the Second Stage Gold Group
3	Tekstilshchik Ivanovo	18	8	6	4	24	16	+8	30	Qualification for the Second Stage Gold Group
4	Mashuk-KMV Pyatigorsk	18	8	6	4	20	17	+3	30	Qualification for the Second Stage Gold Group
5	Sibir Novosibirsk	18	7	3	8	26	18	+8	24	Qualification for the Second Stage Gold Group
6	Leningradets	18	7	3	8	22	25	−3	24	Qualification for the Second Stage Gold Group
7	Tyumen	18	6	5	7	31	26	+5	23	Qualification for the Second Stage Silver Group
8	Dynamo Kirov	18	5	5	8	20	24	−4	20	Qualification for the Second Stage Silver Group
9	Alania Vladikavkaz	18	5	2	11	19	30	−11	17	Qualification for the Second Stage Silver Group
10	Dynamo-2 Moscow	18	1	9	8	9	36	−27	12	Qualification for the Second Stage Silver Group

Source: Second League Division A (in Russian), Soccerway
Rules for classification: 1) Points; 2) Head-to-head points; 3) Head-to-head matches won; 4) Head-to-head goal difference; 5) Head-to-head goals scored; 6) Matches won; 7) Goal difference; 8) Goals scored; 9) Away matches won; 10) Away goals scored; 11) Disciplinary record in ascending order (3 points for direct red card, 1 point for yellow card, 2.5 points for red card after two yellows); 12) 2024–25 position (does not apply to final standings); 13) Play-offs. If the teams tied on points did not all play equal number of head-to-head games, head-to-head criteria are not used to determine the standings.

==== Top goalscorers ====
Rank	Player	Club	Goals
1	Timur Melekestsev	Tekstilshchik Ivanovo	7
2	Aleksandr Shubin	Veles Moscow	6
3	Maksim Bachinsky	Leningradets Leningrad Oblast	5
3	Aleksandr Bem	Tyumen	5
3	Gleb Miroshnichenko	Dynamo-2 Moscow	5
3	Bilal Bilalov	Sibir Novosibirsk	5
3	Artemi Ukomsky	Dynamo Kirov	5

=== Silver Group ===
Pos	Team	Pld	W	D	L	GF	GA	GD	Pts	Qualification or relegation
1	Rodina-2 Moscow	14	7	4	3	18	12	+6	25	Qualification for the Second Stage Gold Group
2	Kaluga	14	7	3	4	20	14	+6	24	Qualification for the Second Stage Gold Group
3	Torpedo Miass	14	4	8	2	14	12	+2	20	Qualification for the Second Stage Gold Group
4	Irtysh Omsk	14	4	7	3	15	13	+2	19	Qualification for the Second Stage Gold Group
5	Kuban Krasnodar	14	4	6	4	14	14	0	18	Qualification for the Second Stage Silver Group
6	Dynamo Vladivostok	14	5	2	7	13	16	−3	17	Qualification for the Second Stage Silver Group
7	Avangard Kursk (Note: Murom finished in a place other than 5th or 6th. Therefore, the play-offs were not be held, and Avangard Kursk was relegated automatically.)	14	3	4	7	14	23	−9	13	Relegation to the 2026 Division B
8	Murom	14	2	6	6	13	17	−4	12	Relegation to the 2026 Division B

Source: Second League Division A (in Russian), Soccerway
Rules for classification: 1) Points; 2) Head-to-head points; 3) Head-to-head matches won; 4) Head-to-head goal difference; 5) Head-to-head goals scored; 6) Matches won; 7) Goal difference; 8) Goals scored; 9) Away matches won; 10) Away goals scored; 11) Disciplinary record in ascending order (3 points for direct red card, 1 point for yellow card, 2.5 points for red card after two yellows); 12) 2024–25 position (does not apply to final standings); 13) Play-offs. If the teams tied on points did not all play equal number of head-to-head games, head-to-head criteria are not used to determine the standings.

==== Top goalscorers ====
Rank	Player	Club	Goals
1	Daniil Agureyev	Dynamo Vladivostok	6
1	Roman Yanushkovsky	Irtysh Omsk	6
3	Dmitri Yugaldin	Kaluga	5
3	Nikita Dorofeyev	Irtysh Omsk	5
3	Ivan Matyushenko	Kaluga	5

== Second stage ==
=== Gold Group ===
Pos	Team	Pld	W	D	L	GF	GA	GD	Pts	
1	Leningradets (C, P)	18	10	4	4	23	23	0	34	Promotion to the Russian First League
2	Tekstilshchik Ivanovo (P)	18	10	2	6	29	18	+11	32 (Note: Head-to-head games: Tekstilshchik-Sibir 5–1, Sibir-Tekstilshchik 1–0.)	Promotion to the Russian First League
3	Sibir Novosibirsk	18	9	5	4	28	20	+8	32	Qualification for the promotion play-offs
4	Veles Moscow (Note: Veles Moscow qualified for the play-offs by finishing 1st in the First Stage.) (O, P)	18	8	4	6	20	12	+8	28	Qualification for the promotion play-offs
5	Mashuk-KMV Pyatigorsk	18	5	11	2	20	13	+7	26	
6	Volgar Astrakhan	18	6	6	6	21	19	+2	24	
7	Kaluga (Note: Kaluga, which finished in the spot qualifying for Silver Group, will be kept in the Gold Group, to replace Chernomorets Novorossiysk, which was relegated from the First League and did not receive a license to the Second League.)	18	5	5	8	17	20	−3	20	
8	Rodina-2 Moscow (Note: Rodina-2, which finished in the spot qualifying for Silver Group, will be kept in the Gold Group, to replace Chayka Peschanokopskoye, which was relegated from the First League and did not receive a license to the Second League.)	18	4	7	7	20	23	−3	19	
9	Torpedo Miass	18	3	7	8	13	23	−10	16	Qualification for the 2026–27 First Stage Silver Group
10	Irtysh Omsk	18	1	7	10	11	31	−20	10	Qualification for the 2026–27 First Stage Silver Group

Source: Second League Division A (in Russian), Soccerway
Rules for classification: 1) Points; 2) Head-to-head points; 3) Head-to-head matches won; 4) Head-to-head goal difference; 5) Head-to-head goals scored; 6) Matches won; 7) Goal difference; 8) Goals scored; 9) Away matches won; 10) Away goals scored; 11) Disciplinary record in ascending order (3 points for direct red card, 1 point for yellow card, 2.5 points for red card after two yellows); 12) 2024–25 position (does not apply to final standings); 13) Play-offs. If the teams tied on points did not all play equal number of head-to-head games, head-to-head criteria are not used to determine the standings.
(C) Champions; (O) Play-off winners; (P) Promoted

==== Top goalscorers ====
Rank	Player	Club	Goals
1	Timur Melekestsev	Tekstilshchik Ivanovo	18
2	Maksim Bachinsky	Leningradets Leningrad Oblast	11
2	Ivan Matyushenko	Kaluga	11
4	Denis Pokotylo	Sibir Novosibirsk	10
4	Artemi Ukomsky	Leningradets Leningrad Oblast	10

=== Silver Group ===
Pos	Team	Pld	W	D	L	GF	GA	GD	Pts	Qualification or relegation
1	Dynamo Bryansk	18	11	3	4	23	19	+4	36	Qualification for the 2026–27 First Stage Gold Group
2	Dynamo Kirov	18	8	9	1	31	16	+15	33	Qualification for the 2026–27 First Stage Gold Group
3	Alania Vladikavkaz	18	7	5	6	23	22	+1	26	Qualification for the 2026–27 First Stage Gold Group
4	Dynamo Vladivostok	18	6	6	6	21	20	+1	24 (Note: Head-to-head games: Dynamo Vladivostok-Amkar 1–1, Amkar-Dynamo Vladivostok 0–1.)	Qualification for the 2026–27 First Stage Gold Group
5	Amkar Perm	18	6	6	6	30	26	+4	24	
6	Dynamo-2 Moscow	18	5	7	6	29	36	−7	22 (Note: Head-to-head games: Zenit 2-Dynamo 2 1–3, Dynamo 2-Zenit 2 2–2.)	
7	Zenit-2 St. Petersburg	18	6	4	8	33	37	−4	22	
8	Tyumen	18	5	5	8	25	25	0	20	
9	Dynamo Stavropol	18	5	3	10	20	26	−6	18 (Note: Head-to-head games: Dynamo Stavropol-Kuban 2–1, Kuban-Dynamo Stavropol 1–1.)	Qualification for the 2026 relegation play-offs
10	Kuban Krasnodar (Note: Kuban Krasnodar did not obtain a license for the next season, the club will form a team to play in Division B, in March 2027.)	18	4	6	8	17	25	−8	18	Relegated to 2027 Division B

Source: Second League Division A (in Russian), Soccerway
Rules for classification: 1) Points; 2) Head-to-head points; 3) Head-to-head matches won; 4) Head-to-head goal difference; 5) Head-to-head goals scored; 6) Matches won; 7) Goal difference; 8) Goals scored; 9) Away matches won; 10) Away goals scored; 11) Disciplinary record in ascending order (3 points for direct red card, 1 point for yellow card, 2.5 points for red card after two yellows); 12) 2024–25 position (does not apply to final standings); 13) Play-offs. If the teams tied on points did not all play equal number of head-to-head games, head-to-head criteria are not used to determine the standings.

==== Top goalscorers ====
Rank	Player	Club	Goals
1	Makhach Abdulkhamidov	Alania Vladikavkaz	11
2	Kirill Kosarev	Zenit-2 St. Petersburg	10
3	Vladlen Babayev	Tyumen	9
4	Ruslan Bolov	Tyumen	8
5	Artyom Zakirov	Alania Vladikavkaz	7
5	Andrey Kasadzhikov	Zenit-2 St. Petersburg	7
5	Gleb Miroshnichenko	Dynamo-2 Moscow	7
5	Maksim Nikiforov	Dynamo-2 Moscow	7
5	Matvey Martinkevich	Dynamo Kirov	7

== Promotion play-offs ==
=== First leg ===
17 June 2026
19:00

Veles Moscow	4–1	Sibir Novosibirsk
Girayev 8'; Zavezyon (yellow card) 24'; Shubin (yellow card) 27' (goal) 49'; Kovalkov 50'; Nikin 84'	Report	Maksimenkov (yellow card) 12' (yellow-red card) 34'; Kvekveskiri (yellow card) 68' (goal) 90+4'

Avangard Stadium, Domodedovo
Attendance: 795
Referee: Aleksandr Mayun

=== Second leg ===
21 June 2026
12:00
(16:00 KRAT)

Sibir Novosibirsk	2–1	Veles Moscow
Kobyalko 10', 45+2'; Nosov (yellow card) 19'; V.Laptev (yellow card) 51'; Zotov (yellow card) 65'; Yakovlev (yellow card) 85'; Petrunin (yellow card) 90+2' (yellow-red card) 90+4'	Report	Tarasenko 68'

Zarya indoor football arena, Novosibirsk
Attendance: 2,031
Referee: Semen Medvedev

5–3 on aggregate, Veles Moscow was promoted to the First League.
