= 2026–27 Russian First League =

Russian First League
- Season: 2026–27
- Dates: 11 July 2026 - June 2027
- Matches: 167
- Goals: 451 (2.7 per match)
- Top goalscorer: Vyacheslav Grulyov (20 goals)
- Biggest home win: Nizhny Novgorod 6–0 Leningradets; 17 September 2026
- Biggest away win: Chelyabinsk 0–4 Torpedo; 15 August 2026; Spartak 0–4 Nizhny Novgorod; 8 November 2026
- Highest scoring: Arsenal 4–3 KAMAZ; 24 October 2026
- Longest winning run: 9 matches Nizhny Novgorod
- Longest unbeaten run: 11 matches Nizhny Novgorod; Ural
- Longest winless run: 8 matches KAMAZ; Neftekhimik; SKA-Khabarovsk
- Longest losing run: 5 matches SKA-Khabarovsk
- Highest attendance: 16,063; Rotor 1–1 Ural; 14 August 2026
- Lowest attendance: 172; Spartak 1–0 Neftekhimik; 14 September 2026 played in Khimki
- Total attendance: 626,446
- Average attendance: 3,751
- All statistics correct as of 22 November 2026.

The 2026–27 Russian First League (First League Pari for sponsorship reasons) is the 35th season of Russia's second-tier football league since the dissolution of the Soviet Union. The season began on 11 July 2026, and will have a 3-month winter break between December 2026 and March 2027. The regular season will end on 29 May 2027 and will be followed by promotion play-offs.

== Team changes ==
=== To First League ===
Promoted from Second League Division A

- Leningradets Leningrad Oblast
- Tekstilshchik Ivanovo
- Veles Moscow

Relegated from Premier League

- Nizhny Novgorod (renamed from Pari Nizhny Novgorod)
- Sochi

=== From First League ===
Relegated to Second League

- Chernomorets Novorossiysk
- Sokol Saratov
- Chayka Peschanokopskoye

Promoted to Premier League

- Rodina Moscow
- Fakel Voronezh

== Stadiums by locations ==
Location of teams in 2026–27 First League.

== League table ==
Pos	Team	Pld	W	D	L	GF	GA	GD	Pts	Promotion, qualification or relegation
1	Nizhny Novgorod	18	16	1	1	55	15	+40	49	Promotion to 2027–28 Premier League
2	Ural Yekaterinburg	18	11	4	3	31	11	+20	37	Promotion to 2027–28 Premier League
3	Torpedo Moscow	19	10	5	4	30	16	+14	35	Qualification to Premier League play-offs
4	Sochi	19	10	4	5	28	22	+6	34	Qualification to Premier League play-offs
5	Veles Moscow	20	9	5	6	27	27	0	32	
6	Spartak Kostroma	19	8	5	6	26	26	0	29	
7	Shinnik Yaroslavl	19	6	10	3	23	19	+4	28	
8	Volga Ulyanovsk	20	7	4	9	24	27	−3	25	
9	Chelyabinsk	18	7	3	8	27	29	−2	24	
10	Ufa	19	5	8	6	22	22	0	23	
11	Rotor Volgograd	18	5	7	6	25	20	+5	22	
12	SKA-Khabarovsk	19	5	5	9	25	29	−4	20 (Note: Head-to-head points: Arsenal, SKA-Khabarovsk 1. Ranked on goal difference.)	
13	Arsenal Tula	18	5	5	8	22	37	−15	20	
14	Leningradets Leningrad Oblast	18	4	6	8	16	28	−12	18	
15	KAMAZ Naberezhnye Chelny	18	4	5	9	24	31	−7	17 (Note: Head-to-head points: KAMAZ, Yenisey 1. Ranked on goal difference.)	
16	Yenisey Krasnoyarsk	18	4	5	9	20	35	−15	17	Relegation to 2027–28 Second League
17	Neftekhimik Nizhnekamsk	18	4	2	12	12	26	−14	14	Relegation to 2027–28 Second League
18	Tekstilshchik Ivanovo	18	2	6	10	14	31	−17	12	Relegation to 2027–28 Second League

Updated to match(es) played on 22 November 2026. Source: Soccerway
Rules for classification: 1) Points; 2) Head-to-head points; 3) Head-to-head matches won; 4) Head-to-head goal difference; 5) Head-to-head goals scored; 6) Matches won; 7) Goal difference; 8) Goals scored; 9) Away matches won; 10) Away goals scored; 11) Disciplinary record in ascending order (3 points for direct red card, 1 point for yellow card, 2.5 points for red card after two yellows); 12) 2025–26 position (does not apply to final standings); 13) Play-offs. If the teams tied on points did not all play equal number of head-to-head matches, head-to-head criteria are not used to determine the standings.

== Results ==
Home \ Away	ARS	CHL	KAM	LEN	NEF	NIZ	ROT	SHI	SKA	SOC	SPA	TEK	TOR	UFA	URA	VEL	VOL	YEN
Arsenal Tula		1–2	4–3		0–1		2–1		2–2		3–2	2–1	1–0		2–2			
Chelyabinsk						1–2		2–0	3–1		0–1		0–4	2–1	1–3	4–2		1–1
KAMAZ Naberezhnye Chelny		1–1			2–1	1–2	0–2			2–3	3–1	0–1	1–1				1–2	
Leningradets Leningrad Oblast	0–0	1–1	0–1						3–2	2–1		2–2	1–3		0–0			3–0
Neftekhimik Nizhnekamsk		2–4		1–1				0–2	0–2	1–2		1–0		0–1	0–1	0–1		
Nizhny Novgorod	4–0			6–0	5–1		4–2	3–0	4–2				3–0				2–2	5–0
Rotor Volgograd		4–1		1–1	0–1				1–0	0–1				0–0	1–1		2–2	4–0
Shinnik Yaroslavl	2–2		0–1	2–0	1–1		2–2		0–0	2–2	2–1	2–0		2–1	1–1			
SKA-Khabarovsk			3–3	1–0			1–1				1–3	3–0	0–2		0–3	2–0	1–2	3–0
Sochi	5–0	2–1				0–1		0–0	1–1		0–2			1–0	0–2	2–2	1–0	
Spartak Kostroma			3–1	2–0	1–0	0–4	1–0							1–1	1–2			2–2
Tekstilshchik Ivanovo	2–2	2–1				1–3	0–2			1–3	0–0		1–4	2–2		0–1		
Torpedo Moscow					1–0	1–2	1–1	1–1		1–2	3–0					1–1	3–1	
Ufa	2–0		1–1	3–0		0–1			1–0		3–3		0–0		0–2	1–1	2–2	3–1
Ural Yekaterinburg			2–0			1–2						2–0	0–1	3–0		1–2	2–0	3–0
Veles Moscow	2–0	1–0	2–1	2–1		3–2	2–1	1–1		1–2	1–1						1–2	
Volga Ulyanovsk	3–0	0–2		0–1	2–0			1–3			0–1	1–1	0–1			1–0		1–2
Yenisey Krasnoyarsk	3–1		2–2		0–2			0–0		3–0		0–0	1–2			4–1	1–2	

Updated to match(es) played on 22 November 2026. Source: First League (in Russian), Soccerway
Legend: Blue = home team win; Yellow = draw; Red = away team win.

== Positions by round ==
Team ╲ Round	1	2	3	4	5	6	7	8	9	10	11	12	13	14	15	16	17	18	19	20	21	22	23	24	25	26	27	28	29	30	31	32	33	34
Nizhny Novgorod	2	2	1	1	1	1	1	1	1	1	1	1	1	1	1	1	1																	
Ural Yekaterinburg	14	7	10	5	4	4	5	4	5	5	6	2	4	6	4	3	2																	
Sochi	9	14	9	13	8	6	3	3	3	3	2	4	2	2	2	2	3																	
Torpedo Moscow	8	3	4	6	10	5	7	5	4	4	5	6	5	3	3	4	4																	
Veles Moscow	7	4	7	2	2	2	2	2	2	2	3	5	3	5	6	6	5																	
Spartak Kostroma	3	1	3	3	3	3	4	7	6	6	4	3	6	4	5	5	6																	
Shinnik Yaroslavl	10	6	8	12	14	9	10	6	8	8	8	9	7	8	7	7	7																	
Volga Ulyanovsk	11	16	12	15	12	12	12	14	14	13	12	15	12	10	8	8	8																	
Ufa	1	5	2	4	7	10	11	8	7	7	7	7	9	7	9	9	9																	
Rotor Volgograd	15	11	6	9	5	7	8	10	10	11	9	8	8	9	11	10	10																	
Chelyabinsk	4	8	11	8	11	13	13	13	13	15	15	14	11	12	12	12	11																	
Arsenal Tula	6	9	14	11	9	11	6	9	9	10	10	11	10	11	10	11	12																	
Leningradets Leningrad Oblast	18	18	16	14	15	15	16	16	16	14	13	12	14	15	14	13	13																	
Yenisey Krasnoyarsk	5	12	5	7	6	8	9	12	11	12	14	10	13	13	13	15	14																	
SKA-Khabarovsk	17	17	17	18	18	16	17	17	18	18	18	18	17	18	17	16	15																	
KAMAZ Naberezhnye Chelny	16	15	18	17	17	18	18	18	17	17	17	16	16	14	15	14	16																	
Neftekhimik Nizhnekamsk	13	10	13	10	13	14	14	11	12	9	11	13	15	16	16	17	17																	
Tekstilshchik Ivanovo	12	13	15	16	16	17	15	15	15	16	16	17	18	17	18	18	18																	

Promotion
Play-offs
Relegation to 2027–28 Russian Second League

Updated to match(es) played on 9 November 2026. Source: everysport.com

== Results by round ==
Team ╲ Round	1	2	3	4	5	6	7	8	9	10	11	12	13	14	15	16	17	18	19	20	21	22	23	24	25	26	27	28	29	30	31	32	33	34
Arsenal Tula	W	L	L	W	D	D	W	L	D	L	D	L	W	L	W	L	L	D																
Chelyabinsk	W	L	L	W	L	L	D	L	L	D	W	D	W	L	L	W	W	W																
KAMAZ Naberezhnye Chelny	L	L	L	D	L	D	L	L	W	L	D	W	D	W	L	D	L	W																
Leningradets Leningrad Oblast	L	L	D	W	L	D	D	L	W	D	L	W	L	L	D	W	D	L																
Neftekhimik Nizhnekamsk	L	W	L	W	L	L	L	W	L	W	L	L	L	L	D	L	L	D																
Nizhny Novgorod	W	W	W	W	W	W	L	W	D	W	W	W	W	W	W	W	W	W																
Rotor Volgograd	L	W	W	L	W	D	L	L	L	D	W	W	D	L	D	D	D	D																
Shinnik Yaroslavl	D	W	D	L	D	W	W	D	D	D	L	D	W	D	W	L	W	D	D															
SKA-Khabarovsk	L	L	L	L	L	W	L	L	L	D	D	D	D	L	W	W	W	W	D															
Sochi	D	L	W	L	W	W	W	W	W	L	W	D	W	W	W	L	L	D	D															
Spartak Kostroma	W	W	D	D	W	D	L	W	W	W	W	L	L	W	L	D	L	D	L															
Tekstilshchik Ivanovo	L	D	D	L	D	L	W	L	L	L	D	L	L	W	L	D	L	D																
Torpedo Moscow	W	W	D	L	L	W	W	W	W	L	D	D	W	W	D	D	W	W	L															
Ufa	W	D	W	D	L	D	W	W	D	D	L	D	L	W	L	D	L	D	L															
Ural Yekaterinburg	L	W	D	W	W	D	W	D	W	D	W	W	L	L	W	W	W	W																
Veles Moscow	W	W	L	W	W	L	W	W	W	D	L	D	L	W	D	L	D	W	L	D														
Volga Ulyanovsk	L	L	W	L	W	L	L	D	W	D	L	L	W	D	W	W	D	L	L	W														
Yenisey Krasnoyarsk	W	L	W	D	D	D	L	D	L	L	W	D	L	L	L	L	W	L																

Updated to match(es) played on 22 November 2026. Source: Soccerstats.com (in English)
W = Win; D = Draw; L = Lose

== Season statistics ==
=== Top goalscorers ===
Rank	Player	Club	Goals
1	(Russia) Vyacheslav Grulyov	Nizhny Novgorod	20
2	(Russia) Amur Kalmykov	Spartak	15
3	(Russia) Ramazan Gadzhimuradov	Chelyabinsk	10
4	(Colombia) Dilan Ortiz	Ufa	9
5	(Russia) Matvey Urvantsev	Chelyabinsk	8
5	(Russia) Abu-Said Eldarushev	Rotor	8
5	(Russia) Zakhar Fyodorov	Sochi	8
8	(Russia) Karim Girayev	Veles	7
8	(Russia) Aleksandr Saplinov	Volga	7
8	(Russia) Rashid Magomedov	Arsenal	7
