= Rasul Mitsayev =

Russian footballer (born 2002)

Personal information
- Full name: Rasul Salambekovich Mitsayev
- Date of birth: 3 August 2002 (age 24)
- Place of birth: Nalchik, Russia
- Height: 2.00 m (6 ft 7 in)
- Position: Goalkeeper

Team information
- Current team: Akhmat Grozny
- Number: 71

Youth career
- –2018: Spartak Nalchik
- 2018–2019: Akhmat Grozny
- 2020–2021: Dynamo Moscow

Senior career*
Years	Team	Apps	(Gls)
2021–2022	Dynamo Makhachkala	0	(0)
2022–2023	Spartak Nalchik	15	(0)
2023–2024	Forte Taganrog	4	(0)
2024–2025	Avangard Kursk	31	(0)
2025–2026	Veles Moscow	41	(1)
2026–	Akhmat Grozny	2	(0)
- * Club domestic league appearances and goals as of 21 November 2026

Rasul Salambekovich Mitsayev (Russian: Расул Саламбекович Мицаев; born 3 August 2002) is a Russian football player who plays as a goalkeeper for Akhmat Grozny.

== Career ==
He spent his junior career at Spartak Nalchik, Akhmat Grozny and Dynamo Moscow (where he appeared in pre-season games for the senior squad, and for the Under-19 squad with future Russia national team players Arsen Zakharyan and Konstantin Tyukavin).

Mitsayev made his senior league debut in the third-tier Russian Second League for Spartak Nalchik in 2022 and continued to play on that level for four seasons.

On 19 April 2026, Mitsayev scored a goal for Veles Moscow in a game against Mashuk-KMV. He took a free kick from his team's penalty box, the ball flew the length of the field and bounced over Mashuk's goalkeeper.

On 12 July 2026, Mitsayev signed a contract with Russian Premier League club Akhmat Grozny, where he spend part of his junior career. The contract term is three seasons, with a club option to extend for one additional season.

He made his debut for Akhmat on 14 October 2026 in a Russian Cup game against Dynamo Moscow.

On 7 November 2026, Mitsayev made his Russian Premier League debut for Akhmat against Rodina Moscow, keeping a clean sheet.

== Personal life ==
Mitsayev is an ethnic Chechen.

== Career statistics ==
As of 21 November 2026

Club	Season	League			Cup		Other		Total	
Club	Season	Division	Apps	Goals	Apps	Goals	Apps	Goals	Apps	Goals
Dynamo Makhachkala	2021–22	Russian Second League	0	0	—		—		0	0
Spartak Nalchik	2022–23	Russian Second League	15	0	0	0	—		15	0
Forte Taganrog	2023–24	Russian Second League A	4	0	0	0	—		4	0
Avangard Kursk	2023–24	Russian Second League A	15	0	—		—		15	0
Avangard Kursk	2024–25	Russian Second League A	16	0	0	0	—		16	0
Avangard Kursk	Total		31	0	0	0	0	0	31	0
Veles Moscow	2024–25	Russian Second League A	7	0	0	0	—		7	0
Veles Moscow	2025–26	Russian Second League A	34	1	0	0	2 (Note: Appearances in the promotion play-offs)	0	36	1
Veles Moscow	Total		41	1	0	0	2	0	43	1
Akhmat Grozny	2026–27	Russian Premier League	2	0	2	0	—		4	0
Career total			93	1	2	0	2	0	97	1
