= 2026–27 Russian Second League Division A =

Russian Second League Division A
- Season: 2026–27
- Dates: 18 July 2026 – June 2027
- Relegated: Irtysh Omsk

The 2026–27 Russian Second League Division A is the 35th season of Russia's third-tier football league since the dissolution of the Soviet Union. The season will began on 18 July 2026 and will end in June 2027.

== Overview ==
Before the 2023–24 season, the Russian Second League was reorganized and split into two tiers - third-tier Russian Second League Division A and fourth-tier Russian Second League Division B.

Division A consists of two groups.

The Gold Group initially included 10 teams:

- 1 team relegated from the 2025–26 Russian First League (FC Sokol Saratov). FC Chernomorets Novorossiysk and FC Chayka Peschanokopskoye, which finished the First League season in the relegation spot, did not receive a license to the Second League.
- 3 teams from the Top 6 of the 2025–26 Second stage Gold Group that were not promoted to the Russian First League.
- FC Kaluga and FC Rodina-2 Moscow, which finished 7th and 8th in the 2025–26 Second stage Gold Group and would have been moved to the Silver Group, but were kept in the Gold Group to replace Chernomorets and Chayka.
- Top 4 teams from the 2025–26 Second stage Silver Group.

The Silver Group initially included 7 teams (instead of usual 10):

- Bottom 2 teams from the 2025–26 Second stage Gold Group.
- Teams placed 5th to 9th from the 2025–26 Second stage Silver Group.

FC Kuban Krasnodar, which finished last in the 2025–26 Second stage Silver Group, did not obtain a license for the next season, and could not be replaced by a Division B team, as Division B is contested on a March-to-November cycle.

In the first part of the season (summer/autumn 2026), each team in the Gold and Silver groups played each other team in the same group twice, home-and-away, for 18 games (in the Gold Group) and 12 games (in the Silver Group) in total for each team.

For the second part of the season (spring/summer 2027), groups were re-constituted.

Top 6 teams of the First stage Gold Group and top 4 teams of the First stage Silver Group qualified for the Second stage Gold Group. Bottom 4 teams of the First stage Gold Group were moved to the Second stage Silver Group.

Four winners of the 2026 Division B groups will be promoted to the Second stage Silver Group.

Team that finished 7th in the First stage Silver Group would qualify for the relegation play-offs (two games, home-and-away) against the team that finished 9th in the Second stage Silver Group of the 2025–26 Russian Second League Division A, PFC Dynamo Stavropol. The play-offs would only be held if Dynamo Stavropol finished 5th or 6th in the First stage Silver Group. If Dynamo Stavropol finished in any other place, the play-offs would not be held, and the 7th-placed team would be relegated automatically. Dynamo finished 5th and faced 7th-placed FC Irtysh Omsk in the relegation play-offs.

The teams in re-constituted groups (with Silver Group now containing 10 teams) will play each other twice more for 18 more games. Top 2 Gold Group teams at the end of the season will be promoted to the Russian First League for the 2027–28 season.

The 3rd-placed Second stage Gold Group team will play in promotion play-offs (two games, home-and-away), if they successfully apply for the 2027-28 Russian First League license. Their opponent will be:

1. The 1st-placed First stage Gold Group team, unless that team finishes in the top 2 or in the bottom 4 in the second stage; if 3rd-placed Second stage team was 1st in the First stage, it would get promoted automatically; otherwise
2. The 2nd-placed First stage Gold Group team, unless that team finishes in the top 2 or in the bottom 4 in the second stage; if 3rd-placed Second stage team was 2nd in the First stage, it would get promoted automatically; otherwise
3. The 3rd-placed First stage Gold Group team, unless that team finishes in the top 2 or in the bottom 4 in the second stage; if 3rd-placed Second stage team was 3rd in the First stage, it would get promoted automatically.

If none of the top-3 First stage Gold Group teams qualify for the promotion play-offs under the conditions described above, the play-offs would not be held and the 3rd-place Second stage Gold Group team would be promoted to the Russian First League automatically.

If the 3rd-placed Second stage Gold Group team does not receive the 2027–28 Russian First League license prior to the play-offs, the play-offs will be contended by:

1. The 1st-placed First stage Gold Group team and 2nd-placed First stage Gold Group team, unless either of those teams finish in the top 3 or the bottom 4 in the second stage; otherwise
2. The 1st-placed First stage Gold Group team and 3rd-placed First stage Gold Group team, unless either of those teams finish in the top 3 or the bottom 4 in the second stage; otherwise
3. The 2nd-placed First stage Gold Group team and 3rd-placed First stage Gold Group team, unless either of those teams finish in the top 3 or the bottom 4 in the second stage; otherwise
4. If only one of the top 3 First stage teams finish outside of top 3 and outside of bottom 4 in the second stage, that team will be promoted directly; otherwise
5. If none of the top 3 First stage teams finish outside of top 3 and outside of bottom 4 in the second stage, the highest-placed First League team that would be relegated will remain in the First League

If one or both of the Top 2 Second stage Gold Group teams do not receive the 2027–28 Russian First League license, the play-offs would not be held, and both teams that would otherwise qualify for the play-offs would be promoted automatically.

The bottom four teams in the Gold Group at the end of the season would be moved to Silver Group for the 2027–28 season, and the top four teams in the Silver Group would be moved to Gold Group. The bottom two teams in the Second stage Silver Group would qualify for the 2027 relegation play-offs.

The rotation between Division A and Division B will be happening in the winter going forward, as Division B switched to spring-to-autumn, March-to-November cycle for their seasons. There will no relegation from Division A or promotion to it immediately at the end of the 2026–27 season.

== First stage ==
=== Gold Group ===
Pos	Team	Pld	W	D	L	GF	GA	GD	Pts	Qualification or relegation
1	Dynamo Kirov	18	11	4	3	28	15	+13	37	Qualification for the Second Stage Gold Group
2	Rodina-2 Moscow (Note: Rodina-2 is a reserve team of the Russian Premier League team Rodina Moscow. If Rodina is relegated to the First League at the end of the 2026–27 Russian Premier League season, Rodina-2 will not be eligible for promotion to the First League)	18	9	4	5	29	24	+5	31	Qualification for the Second Stage Gold Group
3	Dynamo Vladivostok	18	7	6	5	21	15	+6	27	Qualification for the Second Stage Gold Group
4	Alania Vladikavkaz	18	6	8	4	26	20	+6	26	Qualification for the Second Stage Gold Group
5	Mashuk-KMV Pyatigorsk	18	3	13	2	19	16	+3	22	Qualification for the Second Stage Gold Group
6	Sokol Saratov	18	5	7	6	18	23	−5	22	Qualification for the Second Stage Gold Group
7	Sibir Novosibirsk	18	5	7	6	20	23	−3	22	Qualification for the Second Stage Silver Group
8	Dynamo Bryansk	18	5	5	8	17	27	−10	20	Qualification for the Second Stage Silver Group
9	Volgar Astrakhan	18	1	12	5	16	21	−5	15	Qualification for the Second Stage Silver Group
10	Kaluga	18	1	8	9	15	25	−10	11	Qualification for the Second Stage Silver Group

Source: Second League Division A (in Russian), Soccerway
Rules for classification: 1) Points; 2) Head-to-head points; 3) Head-to-head matches won; 4) Head-to-head goal difference; 5) Head-to-head goals scored; 6) Matches won; 7) Goal difference; 8) Goals scored; 9) Away matches won; 10) Away goals scored; 11) Disciplinary record in ascending order (3 points for direct red card, 1 point for yellow card, 2.5 points for red card after two yellows); 12) 2024–25 position (does not apply to final standings); 13) Play-offs. If the teams tied on points did not all play equal number of head-to-head games, head-to-head criteria are not used to determine the standings.

==== Top goalscorers ====
Rank	Player	Club	Goals
1	Daniil Konoplyov	Dynamo Bryansk	7
1	Anton Kobyalko	Sibir	7
3	Makhach Abdulkhamidov	Alania	6
4	Yegor Ushakov	Rodina-2	5
4	Daniel Svintsov	Rodina-2	5
4	Artemi Ukomsky	Sokol	5
4	Ivan Matyushenko	Alania	5

=== Silver Group ===
Pos	Team	Pld	W	D	L	GF	GA	GD	Pts	Qualification or relegation
1	Zenit-2 Saint Petersburg	12	10	2	0	32	5	+27	32	Qualification for the Second Stage Gold Group
2	Amkar Perm	12	7	1	4	27	17	+10	22	Qualification for the Second Stage Gold Group
3	Tyumen	12	7	1	4	24	16	+8	22	Qualification for the Second Stage Gold Group
4	Torpedo Miass	12	6	1	5	20	16	+4	19	Qualification for the Second Stage Gold Group
5	Dynamo Stavropol (Note: Dynamo Stavropol qualified for the relegation play-offs by finishing 9th in the 2025–26 Second Stage Silver Group)	12	3	2	7	12	22	−10	11	Qualification for the 2026 relegation play-offs
6	Dynamo-2 Moscow	12	2	2	8	11	33	−22	8	Qualification for the Second Stage Silver Group
7	Irtysh Omsk	12	2	1	9	11	28	−17	7	Qualification for the 2026 relegation play-offs

Source: Second League Division A (in Russian), Soccerway
Rules for classification: 1) Points; 2) Head-to-head points; 3) Head-to-head matches won; 4) Head-to-head goal difference; 5) Head-to-head goals scored; 6) Matches won; 7) Goal difference; 8) Goals scored; 9) Away matches won; 10) Away goals scored; 11) Disciplinary record in ascending order (3 points for direct red card, 1 point for yellow card, 2.5 points for red card after two yellows); 12) 2024–25 position (does not apply to final standings); 13) Play-offs. If the teams tied on points did not all play equal number of head-to-head games, head-to-head criteria are not used to determine the standings.

==== Top goalscorers ====
Rank	Player	Club	Goals
1	Dmitry Usov	Amkar	12
2	Kirill Kosarev	Zenit-2	7
2	Yevgeni Tatarinov	Tyumen	7
2	Andrei Razborov	Irtysh	7
5	Bogdan Levandovsky	Zenit-2	6
5	Vasily Palkin	Torpedo Miass	6

== Relegation play-offs ==
=== First leg ===
21 October 2026

Dynamo Stavropol	2–1	Irtysh Omsk
Yagyayev 58'; Shilov 77'	Report	Antonov 81'

Yessentuki Arena, Yessentuki
Attendance: 100
Referee: Nikita Morozov

=== Second leg ===
25 October 2026

Irtysh Omsk	2–3	Dynamo Stavropol
Razborov 13' (pen.); Yanushkovsky 90+4'	Report	Garayev 38'; Alimov 72'; Rubanov 90'

Krasnaya Zvezda Indoor Stadium, Omsk
Attendance: 1,418
Referee: Aleksandr Rib

Dynamo Stavropol won 5–3 on aggregate and remained in Division A Silver Group, Irtysh Omsk was relegated to Second League Division B.
