= Sergei Bugriyev =

Russian football player

Personal information
- Full name: Sergei Sergeyevich Bugriyev
- Date of birth: 16 March 1998 (age 28)
- Place of birth: Zelenchukskaya, Russia
- Height: 1.97 m (6 ft 6 in)
- Position: Defender

Team information
- Current team: Spartak Kostroma
- Number: 3

Senior career*
Years	Team	Apps	(Gls)
2017–2019	Zenit-2 Saint Petersburg	58	(1)
2017	→ VSS Košice (loan)	1	(0)
2020–2021	Tom Tomsk	14	(0)
2021	Kyzylzhar	2	(0)
2021	Kyzylzhar II	1	(0)
2022	Vitebsk	2	(0)
2022–	Spartak Kostroma	113	(8)

International career
2015	Russia U17	3	(0)
2016	Russia U18	3	(0)
- * Club domestic league appearances and goals as of 16 May 2026

Sergei Sergeyevich Bugriyev (Russian: Сергей Сергеевич Бугриев; born 16 March 1998) is a Russian football player who plays for Spartak Kostroma.

== Club career ==
He made his debut in the Russian Football National League for Zenit Saint Petersburg 2 on 16 July 2017 in a game against Dynamo Saint Petersburg.

On 23 January 2020 he signed a 1.5-year contract with Tom Tomsk.

On 16 August 2021, he joined Kazakhstan Premier League club Kyzylzhar.

== Career statistics ==
As of 16 May 2026

Club	Season	League			Cup		Total	
Club	Season	Division	Apps	Goals	Apps	Goals	Apps	Goals
VSS Košice (loan)	2016–17	2. Liga	1	0	—		1	0
Zenit-2 Saint Petersburg	2017–18	Russian First League	22	0	—		22	0
Zenit-2 Saint Petersburg	2018–19	Russian First League	27	1	—		27	1
Zenit-2 Saint Petersburg	2019–20	Russian Second League	9	0	—		9	0
Zenit-2 Saint Petersburg	Total		58	1	0	0	58	1
Tom Tomsk	2020–21	Russian First League	14	0	0	0	14	0
Kyzylzhar	2021	Kazakhstan Premier League	2	0	2	0	4	0
Kyzylzhar II	2021	Kazakhstan First League	1	0	—		1	0
Vitebsk	2022	Belarusian Premier League	2	0	1	0	3	0
Spartak Kostroma	2022–23	Russian Second League	24	2	1	0	25	2
Spartak Kostroma	2023–24	Russian Second League A	34	2	1	0	35	2
Spartak Kostroma	2024–25	Russian Second League A	33	3	5	0	38	3
Spartak Kostroma	2025–26	Russian First League	22	1	1	0	23	1
Spartak Kostroma	Total		113	8	8	0	121	8
Career total			191	9	11	0	202	9
