= 2024–25 FC Chayka Peschanokopskoye season =

FC Chayka Peschanokopskoye
2024–25 season
- Stadium: Chayka Central Stadium
- Russian First League: 2nd
- Russian Cup: Pre-season
- Highest home attendance: 1,478 vs Neftekhimik Nizhnekamsk
- Biggest win: Chayka Peschanokopskoye 4–0 Neftekhimik Nizhnekamsk

The 2024–25 season is the 28th season in the history of FC Chayka Peschanokopskoye, and the club's first season back in the Russian First League. In addition to the domestic league, the team is scheduled to participate in the Russian Cup.

== Competitions ==
=== Overall record ===
Competition	First match	Last match	Starting round	Record							
Competition	First match	Last match	Starting round	Pld	W	D	L	GF	GA	GD	Win %
Russian First League	14 July 2024		Matchday 1	4	2	2	0	8	3	+5	50.00
Russian Cup				0	0	0	0	0	0	+0	—
Total				4	2	2	0	8	3	+5	50.00

Last updated: 3 August 2024
Source: Soccerway

=== Russian First League ===
==== League table ====
Pos	Team	Pld	W	D	L	GF	GA	GD	Pts
11	KAMAZ Naberezhnye Chelny	34	10	8	16	31	35	−4	38 (Note: Ranked on head-to-head points (KAMAZ 6, Neftekhimik 5, Chayka 4))
12	Neftekhimik Nizhnekamsk	34	9	11	14	31	37	−6	38
13	Chayka Peschanokopskoye	34	8	14	12	31	43	−12	38
14	Shinnik Yaroslavl	34	8	11	15	24	42	−18	35 (Note: Ranked on head-to-head goal difference (Shinnik +1, Ufa –1))
15	Ufa	34	9	8	17	32	48	−16	35

Source: Soccerway
Rules for classification: 1) Points; 2) Head-to-head points; 3) Head-to-head matches won; 4) Head-to-head goal difference; 5) Head-to-head goals scored; 6) Head-to-head away goals scored; 7) Matches won; 8) Goal difference; 9) Goals scored; 10) Away matches won; 11) Away goals scored; 12) Best disciplinary record (3 points for red card, 1 point for yellow card); 13) Drawing lots. If teams tied on points did not play an equal number of head-to-head games, head-to-head criteria and disciplinary record are not used for positioning. If 1st- and 2nd-placed teams are tied in the final standings on the first 12 criteria, a winner is determined in an additional play-off game, with no extra time and a penalty-shootout if tied at the end of regulation, instead of drawing lots.

==== Results summary ====
Overall								Home						Away					
Pld	W	D	L	GF	GA	GD	Pts	W	D	L	GF	GA	GD	W	D	L	GF	GA	GD
4	2	2	0	8	3	+5	8	1	1	0	5	1	+4	1	1	0	3	2	+1

Last updated: 3 August 2024.

==== Results by round ====
Round	1	2	3	4
Ground	H	A	H	A
Result	D	W	W	D
Position	7	5	2	

Updated to match(es) played on 3 August 2024. Source:
A = Away; H = Home; W = Win; D = Draw; L = Loss

==== Matches ====
The tentative match schedule was released on 27 June.

14 July 2024 1	Chayka Peschanokopskoye	1–1	Sokol Saratov	Peschanokopskoye
20:00 UTC+3	Zabelin 74' (o.g.)		Karpitskiy 52'; Kaplenko (red card) 59'	Stadium: Chayka Central Stadium; Attendance: 1,375; Referee: Bogdan Golovko

21 July 2024 2	Chernomorets Novorossiysk	1–2	Chayka Peschanokopskoye	Novorossiysk
19:30 UTC+3	Khabalov 82'		Rudenko 63'; Khokhlachyov 90+1'	Stadium: Central Stadium; Attendance: 6,158; Referee: Stanislav Matveev

28 July 2024 3	Chayka Peschanokopskoye	4–0	Neftekhimik Nizhnekamsk	Peschanokopskoye
19:30 UTC+3	Bammatgereev 29'; Biblyk 41'; Yanov 62'; Rudenko 82'			Stadium: Chayka Central Stadium; Attendance: 1,478; Referee: Vladislav Tselovalnikov

3 August 2024 4	Torpedo Moscow	1–1	Chayka Peschanokopskoye	Khimki
15:30 UTC+3	Chervyakov 34'		Kozhedub 32' (pen.)	Stadium: Arena Khimki
