= Yevgeni Lyamtsev =

Russian footballer

Personal information
- Full name: Yevgeni Valeryevich Lyamtsev
- Date of birth: 14 February 1989 (age 37)
- Height: 1.86 m (6 ft 1 in)
- Position: Forward

Senior career*
Years	Team	Apps	(Gls)
2007	DYuSSh Dynamo Bryansk		
2008	FC Dynamo Bryansk	2	(0)
2008–2009	DYuSSh Dynamo Bryansk		
2014	FC Bezhitsa Bryansk		
2014–2015	FC Kaluga	30	(4)
- * Club domestic league appearances and goals

Yevgeni Valeryevich Lyamtsev (Russian: Евгений Валерьевич Лямцев; born 14 February 1989) is a former Russian football player.

== Club career ==
He played in the Russian Football National League for FC Dynamo Bryansk in 2008.
