= Ilya Dyomin =

Russian football player

Personal information
- Full name: Ilya Vyacheslavovich Dyomin
- Date of birth: 22 July 1996 (age 30)
- Place of birth: Ivanovo, Russia
- Height: 1.72 m (5 ft 7 1/2 in)
- Position: Midfielder

Youth career
- FC Tekstilshchik Ivanovo

Senior career*
Years	Team	Apps	(Gls)
2016–2020	FC Tekstilshchik Ivanovo	49	(0)
- * Club domestic league appearances and goals

Ilya Vyacheslavovich Dyomin (Russian: Илья Вячеславович Дёмин; born 22 July 1996) is a Russian former football player.

== Club career ==
He made his debut in the Russian Professional Football League for FC Tekstilshchik Ivanovo on 18 August 2016 in a game against FC Spartak Kostroma. He made his Russian Football National League debut for Tekstilshchik on 5 October 2019 in a game against FC Armavir.
