= Artemi Ukomsky =

Russian footballer

Personal information
- Full name: Artemi Aleksandrovich Ukomsky
- Date of birth: 29 April 1998 (age 28)
- Place of birth: Yubileyny, Russia
- Height: 1.88 m (6 ft 2 in)
- Position: Forward

Team information
- Current team: Sokol Saratov
- Number: 11

Youth career
- 2010–2015: Chayka Korolyov
- 2016–2017: Nike Academy

Senior career*
Years	Team	Apps	(Gls)
2014–2015	Chayka Korolyov (amateur)		
2018	Dolgoprudny	7	(1)
2018–2021	Dynamo Bryansk	80	(11)
2022	Kaluga	10	(6)
2022–2024	Spartak Kostroma	35	(20)
2023–2024	→ KAMAZ Naberezhnye Chelny (loan)	14	(2)
2025	Shinnik Yaroslavl	2	(0)
2025	→ Dynamo Kirov (loan)	11	(5)
2026	Leningradets Leningrad Oblast	22	(5)
2026–	Sokol Saratov	11	(5)
- * Club domestic league appearances and goals as of 15 November 2026

Artemi Aleksandrovich Ukomsky (Russian: Артемий Александрович Укомский; born 29 April 1998) is a Russian football player who plays for Sokol Saratov.

== Club career ==
He made his debut in the Russian Football National League for Dynamo Bryansk on 1 August 2020 in a game against Orenburg, he substituted Vladislav Drogunov at half-time.
