= Yampolskiy =

Yampolskiy may refer to:

- Roman Yampolskiy, a computer scientist known for his work on AI safety
- Vladislav Yampolsky (also spelled Yampolskiy), a Russian football player
