= Pyotr Volodkin =

Russian footballer

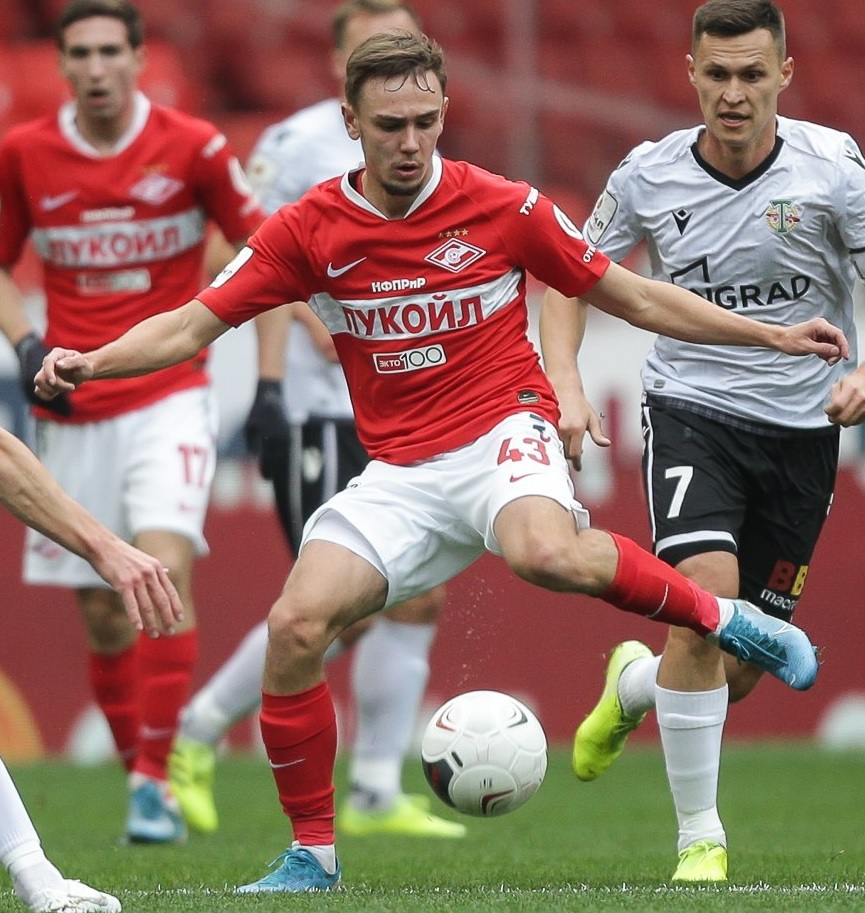
- Volodkin with Spartak-2 in 2019

Personal information
- Full name: Pyotr Sergeyevich Volodkin
- Date of birth: 4 March 1999 (age 27)
- Place of birth: Moscow, Russia
- Height: 1.73 m (5 ft 8 in)
- Position: Midfielder

Youth career
- –2019: FC Spartak Moscow

Senior career*
Years	Team	Apps	(Gls)
2017–2020	FC Spartak-2 Moscow	16	(1)
2020–2022	FC Chayka Peschanokopskoye	48	(6)
2022–2024	FC Forte Taganrog	47	(14)
2024–2025	FC Tekstilshchik Ivanovo	12	(0)

International career^{‡}
2015	Russia U16	3	(0)
2016	Russia U17	9	(0)
2017	Russia U19	4	(0)
- * Club domestic league appearances and goals as of 15 June 2025 ‡ National team caps and goals as of 11 November 2017

Pyotr Sergeyevich Volodkin (Russian: Пётр Сергеевич Володкин; born 4 March 1999) is a Russian football player.

== Club career ==
He made his debut in the Russian Football National League for FC Spartak-2 Moscow on 8 July 2017 in a game against FC Sibir Novosibirsk.
