= Zakhar Fyodorov =

Russian footballer (born 2004)

Personal information
- Full name: Zakhar Andreyevich Fyodorov
- Date of birth: 24 December 2004 (age 21)
- Place of birth: Tomsk, Russia
- Height: 1.82 m (6 ft 0 in)
- Position: Centre-forward

Team information
- Current team: Sochi
- Number: 9

Youth career
- 2011–2021: Tom Tomsk
- 2021–2023: Sochi

Senior career*
Years	Team	Apps	(Gls)
2023–	Sochi	24	(1)
2023–2024	→ Forte Taganrog (loan)	29	(3)
2024–2025	→ Shinnik Yaroslavl (loan)	29	(8)
- * Club domestic league appearances and goals as of 17 May 2026

Zakhar Andreyevich Fyodorov (Russian: Захар Андреевич Фёдоров; born 24 December 2004) is a Russian football player who plays as a centre-forward for Sochi.

== Career ==
He made his debut in the Russian Second League for Forte Taganrog on 16 July 2023, in a game against Rodina-2 Moscow.

He made his debut in the Russian First League for Sochi on 21 July 2024, in a game against Baltika Kaliningrad.

Fyodorov made his debut in the Russian Premier League for Sochi on 10 August 2025 in a game against Dynamo Moscow.

== Career statistics ==
As of 17 May 2026

Club	Season	League			Cup		Total	
Club	Season	Division	Apps	Goals	Apps	Goals	Apps	Goals
Forte Taganrog (loan)	2023–24	Russian Second League A	17	1	3	0	20	1
Forte Taganrog (loan)	2024	Russian Second League B	12	2	–		12	2
Forte Taganrog (loan)	Total		29	3	3	0	32	3
Sochi	2024–25	Russian First League	2	0	–		2	0
Sochi	2025–26	Russian Premier League	22	1	5	1	27	2
Sochi	Total		24	1	5	1	29	2
Shinnik Yaroslavl (loan)	2024–25	Russian First League	29	8	4	0	33	8
Career total			82	12	12	1	94	13
