= Vladislav Rudenko =

Russian footballer

Personal information
- Full name: Vladislav Igorevich Rudenko
- Date of birth: 15 March 1996 (age 30)
- Place of birth: Rostov-on-Don, Russia
- Height: 1.87 m (6 ft 2 in)
- Position: Forward

Team information
- Current team: FC Sokol Saratov
- Number: 19

Senior career*
Years	Team	Apps	(Gls)
2013–2014	FC RO UOR-96-Grebnoy Kanal Rostov-on-Don		
2015	FC Taganrog	13	(0)
2015	FC Biolog-Novokubansk Progress	16	(1)
2016	FC SKA Rostov-on-Don	26	(6)
2017–2019	FC Avangard Kursk	34	(2)
2017–2018	→ FC Chayka Peschanokopskoye (loan)	28	(10)
2019–2020	FC Luch Vladivostok	9	(0)
2020–2021	FC Chita	22	(3)
2021–2022	FC Tuapse	30	(12)
2022–2023	FC Chernomorets Novorossiysk	48	(13)
2023–2025	FC Chayka Peschanokopskoye	44	(7)
2025–2026	FC Volga Ulyanovsk	21	(1)
2026–	FC Sokol Saratov	2	(0)
- * Club domestic league appearances and goals as of 15 November 2026

Vladislav Igorevich Rudenko (Russian: Владислав Игоревич Руденко; born 15 March 1996) is a Russian football player who plays for FC Sokol Saratov.

== Club career ==
He made his debut in the Russian Professional Football League for FC Taganrog on 28 March 2015 in a game against FC Alania Vladikavkaz.

On 30 May 2016, he came on as a substitute with 19 minutes left in the game of his FC SKA Rostov-on-Don against FC Astrakhan and scored a hat-trick in the next 12 minutes.

He made his Russian Football National League debut for FC Avangard Kursk on 24 July 2018 in a game against FC Spartak-2 Moscow.
