= Islamitdin Abdullayev =

Russian footballer

Personal information
- Full name: Islamitdin Nasrullayevich Abdullayev
- Date of birth: 18 March 2000 (age 26)
- Place of birth: Makhachkala, Russia
- Height: 1.82 m (6 ft 0 in)
- Position: Defender

Team information
- Current team: FC Murom
- Number: 77

Youth career
- FC Dynamo Makhachkala

Senior career*
Years	Team	Apps	(Gls)
2019–2021	FC Legion Dynamo Makhachkala	25	(2)
2021–2022	FC Rotor Volgograd	22	(0)
2021–2022	FC Rotor-2 Volgograd	6	(0)
2022–2023	FC Dynamo Makhachkala	0	(0)
2023–2025	FC Druzhba Maykop	42	(1)
2025–2026	PFC Dynamo Stavropol	32	(3)
2026–	FC Murom	19	(3)
- * Club domestic league appearances and goals as of 1 November 2026

Islamitdin Nasrullayevich Abdullayev (Russian: Исламитдин Насруллаевич Абдуллаев; born 18 March 2000) is a Russian football player who plays for FC Murom.

== Club career ==
He made his debut in the Russian Football National League for FC Rotor Volgograd on 29 August 2021 in a game against FC Tom Tomsk.
