= Yevgeni Losev =

Russian footballer and manager

Personal information
- Full name: Yevgeni Sergeyevich Losev
- Date of birth: 3 February 1979 (age 47)
- Place of birth: Ferzikovo, Russian SFSR
- Height: 1.79 m (5 ft 10 1/2 in)
- Positions: Midfielder; forward

Team information
- Current team: FC Kaluga (manager)

Senior career*
Years	Team	Apps	(Gls)
1996	FC Baltika Kaliningrad	0	(0)
1997–2000	FC Lokomotiv Kaluga	123	(47)
2000–2002	FC Shinnik Yaroslavl	39	(9)
2003	FC Khimki	24	(1)
2004	FC Oryol	27	(4)
2005–2006	FC Ural Yekaterinburg	60	(10)
2007	FC Salyut-Energia Belgorod	39	(4)
2008	FC Volgar-Gazprom-2 Astrakhan	26	(14)
2009	FC Dynamo Bryansk	29	(4)
2010	FC Kaluga	8	(0)
2010–2015	FC Tekstilshchik Ivanovo	130	(30)
2015–2017	FC Kaluga	35	(4)
2017	FC Luki-Energiya Velikiye Luki	14	(1)

Managerial career
- 2018–2019: FC Luki-Energiya Velikiye Luki (assistant)
- 2020–2024: FC Kaluga (assistant)
- 2024–: FC Kaluga
- * Club domestic league appearances and goals

Yevgeni Sergeyevich Losev (Russian: Евгений Серге́евич Лосев; born 3 February 1979) is a Russian professional football manager and a former player who is the manager of FC Kaluga.

== Club career ==
He made his debut in the Russian Premier League in 2002 for FC Shinnik Yaroslavl.
