= Maksim Tarasov (footballer) =

Russian footballer

Personal information
- Full name: Maksim Romanovich Tarasov
- Date of birth: 22 May 2001 (age 25)
- Height: 1.76 m (5 ft 9 in)
- Position: Midfielder

Team information
- Current team: Torpedo Miass
- Number: 46

Senior career*
Years	Team	Apps	(Gls)
2018	Rylsk		
2018–2019	Avangard Kursk	0	(0)
2020–2024	Avangard Kursk	69	(6)
2024–2026	Oryol	53	(5)
2026–	Torpedo Miass	29	(0)
- * Club domestic league appearances and goals as of 17 October 2026

Maksim Romanovich Tarasov (Russian: Максим Романович Тарасов; born 22 May 2001) is a Russian football player who plays for Torpedo Miass.

== Club career ==
He made his debut in the Russian Football National League for Avangard Kursk on 9 March 2020 in a game against Torpedo Moscow. He substituted Denis Sinyayev in the 54th minute.
