= Ilya Azyavin =

Russian footballer

Personal information
- Full name: Ilya Andreyevich Azyavin
- Date of birth: 24 July 2000 (age 26)
- Place of birth: Astrakhan, Russia
- Height: 1.81 m (5 ft 11 in)
- Position: Attacking midfielder

Team information
- Current team: Shinnik Yaroslavl
- Number: 24

Youth career
- –2018: Kuban Krasnodar

Senior career*
Years	Team	Apps	(Gls)
2018	Kuban Krasnodar II	14	(0)
2018–2019	Urozhay Krasnodar	5	(0)
2019–2020	Volgar Astrakhan	3	(0)
2020–2021	Codru Lozova	7	(1)
2021–2023	Shinnik Yaroslavl	38	(10)
2022–2023	→ Chelyabinsk (loan)	18	(3)
2023–2024	Murom	30	(19)
2024–2026	Arsenal Tula	26	(4)
2024–2026	→ Arsenal-2 Tula	6	(1)
2026–	Shinnik Yaroslavl	0	(0)
- * Club domestic league appearances and goals as of 16 May 2026

Ilya Andreyevich Azyavin (Russian: Илья Андреевич Азявин; born 24 July 2000) is a Russian footballer who plays as an attacking midfielder for Shinnik Yaroslavl.

== Career statistics ==
=== Club ===
As of 12 January 2021.

Club	Season	League			Cup		Continental		Other		Total	
Club	Season	Division	Apps	Goals	Apps	Goals	Apps	Goals	Apps	Goals	Apps	Goals
Kuban Krasnodar II	2017–18	PFL	14	0	0	0	–		0	0	14	0
Urozhay Krasnodar	2018–19	PFL	5	0	0	0	–		0	0	5	0
Volgar Astrakhan	2019–20	PFL	3	0	0	0	–		0	0	3	0
Codru Lozova	2020–21	Divizia Națională	7	1	0	0	–		0	0	7	1
Career total			29	1	0	0	0	0	0	0	29	1
