= Daniil Agureyev =

Russian footballer

Personal information
- Full name: Daniil Alekseyevich Agureyev
- Date of birth: 23 February 1999 (age 27)
- Place of birth: Veliky Novgorod, Russia
- Height: 1.82 m (6 ft 0 in)
- Position: Forward

Team information
- Current team: FC Amkar Perm
- Number: 9

Senior career*
Years	Team	Apps	(Gls)
2017	FC Elektron Veliky Novgorod (amateur)		
2019–2020	FC Luki-Energiya Velikiye Luki	23	(2)
2020–2021	FC Dynamo Bryansk	26	(1)
2021	FC Biolog-Novokubansk	2	(0)
2021–2023	FC Luki-Energiya Velikiye Luki	43	(9)
2023–2024	FC Murom	34	(7)
2024–2025	FC Kaluga	34	(10)
2025–2026	FC Dynamo Vladivostok	29	(6)
2026–	FC Amkar Perm	9	(0)
- * Club domestic league appearances and goals as of 17 October 2026

Daniil Alekseyevich Agureyev (Russian: Даниил Алексеевич Агуреев; born 23 February 1999) is a Russian football player who plays for FC Amkar Perm.

== Club career ==
He made his debut in the Russian Football National League for FC Dynamo Bryansk on 12 August 2020 in a game against FC Nizhny Novgorod.
