= Aznaur Geryugov =

Kyrgyzstani footballer

Personal information
- Full name: Aznaur Albertovich Geryugov
- Date of birth: 12 August 1992 (age 34)
- Place of birth: Kant, Kyrgyzstan
- Height: 1.72 m (5 ft 8 in)
- Position: Midfielder

Youth career
- 2010–2013: FC Lada Tolyatti

Senior career*
Years	Team	Apps	(Gls)
2008	FC Abdysh-Ata Kant		(1)
2009	FC Kambar-Ata		(2)
2013–2016	FC Lada Tolyatti	61	(2)
2017–2019	FC Lada Tolyatti	38	(10)
2019–2021	FC Akron Tolyatti	47	(4)
2021–2023	FC Volga Ulyanovsk	60	(13)
2024–2026	FC Irtysh Omsk	74	(12)
- * Club domestic league appearances and goals as of 13 June 2026

Aznaur Albertovich Geryugov (Russian: Азнаур Альбертович Герюгов; born 12 August 1992) is a Kyrgyzstani football player who plays for FC Irtysh Omsk.

== Club career ==
He made his debut in the Russian Football National League for FC Akron Tolyatti on 1 August 2020 in a game against FC Fakel Voronezh, as a starter.
