= 2025–26 Russian First League =

Russian First League
- Season: 2025–26
- Dates: 19 July 2025 - 23 May 2026
- Promoted: Rodina; Fakel
- Relegated: Chernomorets; Chayka; Sokol
- Matches: 306
- Goals: 711 (2.32 per match)
- Top goalscorer: Artyom Maksimenko (17 goals)
- Biggest home win: KAMAZ 5–0 Yenisey; 24 October 2025; Ural 5–0 Chayka; 5 April 2026; Rotor 5-0 Chayka; 16 May 2026
- Biggest away win: Chayka 0–6 Rotor; 3 September 2025
- Highest scoring: Rodina 5–2 Chayka; 23 March 2026
- Longest winning run: 6 matches Fakel (twice); Rotor
- Longest unbeaten run: 18 matches Rodina
- Longest winless run: 14 matches Sokol
- Longest losing run: 10 matches Sokol
- Highest attendance: 21,118; Rotor 3–0 KAMAZ; 14 September 2025
- Lowest attendance: 118; Neftekhimik 4–0 Chernomorets; 22 April 2026
- Total attendance: 1,222,797
- Average attendance: 4,049; Three games played behind closed doors and one game that was not held are not included in the lowest and average attendance statistics
- All statistics correct as of 16 May 2026.

The 2025–26 Russian First League (First League Pari for sponsorship reasons) was the 34th season of Russia's second-tier football league since the dissolution of the Soviet Union. The season began on 19 July 2025, and had a 3-month winter break between December 2025 and March 2026. The regular season ended on 16 May 2026 and was followed by promotion play-offs which concluded on 23 May 2026.

== Team changes ==
=== To First League ===
Promoted from Second League Division A

- Spartak Kostroma
- Volga Ulyanovsk
- Chelyabinsk

Relegated from Premier League

- Fakel Voronezh

Khimki, which was administratively relegated from the Premier League, was then dissolved and did not enter the First League.

Pari Nizhny Novgorod, which lost in the relegation play-offs, was kept in the Premier League as a replacement for Khimki.

Orenburg, which was originally relegated from the Premier League, remained in it due to the attempted match-fixing by Torpedo Moscow in the previous season.

=== From First League ===
Relegated to Second League

- Alania Vladikavkaz
- Tyumen

Sokol Saratov, which finished the previous season in the relegation zone, was kept in the league as a replacement for Khimki.

Promoted to Premier League

- Baltika Kaliningrad
- Sochi

Torpedo Moscow, which was initially promoted to the Premier League, was kept in the First League due to attempted match-fixing in the previous season.

== Stadiums by locations ==
Location of teams in 2025–26 First League.

== League table ==
Pos	Team	Pld	W	D	L	GF	GA	GD	Pts	Promotion, qualification or relegation
1	Rodina Moscow (C, P)	34	19	11	4	58	28	+30	68 (Note: Head-to-head points: Rodina 6, Fakel 0.)	Promotion to 2026–27 Premier League
2	Fakel Voronezh (P)	34	20	8	6	44	22	+22	68	Promotion to 2026–27 Premier League
3	Ural Yekaterinburg (Q)	34	18	7	9	51	31	+20	61	Qualification to Premier League play-offs
4	Rotor Volgograd (Q)	34	15	11	8	47	26	+21	56	Qualification to Premier League play-offs
5	KAMAZ Naberezhnye Chelny	34	12	13	9	46	34	+12	49 (Note: Head-to-head points: KAMAZ 7, Yenisey 6, Spartak 4.)	
6	Yenisey Krasnoyarsk	34	13	10	11	37	35	+2	49	
7	Spartak Kostroma	34	12	13	9	46	41	+5	49	
8	Shinnik Yaroslavl	34	11	15	8	34	28	+6	48	
9	Torpedo Moscow	34	12	10	12	37	39	−2	46	
10	Chelyabinsk	34	10	14	10	42	40	+2	44	
11	Neftekhimik Nizhnekamsk	34	10	13	11	40	41	−1	43	
12	SKA-Khabarovsk	34	10	12	12	37	45	−8	42	
13	Arsenal Tula	34	8	15	11	42	44	−2	39	
14	Volga Ulyanovsk	34	9	10	15	35	48	−13	37 (Note: Head-to-head points: Volga 3, Ufa 3. Head-to-head goal difference: Volga +1, Ufa –1.)	
15	Ufa	34	9	10	15	32	40	−8	37	
16	Chernomorets Novorossiysk (R)	34	9	8	17	37	49	−12	35	Relegation to 2026–27 Second League
17	Sokol Saratov (R)	34	5	11	18	16	44	−28	26	Relegation to 2026–27 Second League
18	Chayka Peschanokopskoye (R)	34	5	7	22	30	76	−46	22	Relegation to 2026–27 Second League

Source: Soccerway
Rules for classification: 1) Points; 2) Head-to-head points; 3) Head-to-head matches won; 4) Head-to-head goal difference; 5) Head-to-head goals scored; 6) Matches won; 7) Goal difference; 8) Goals scored; 9) Away matches won; 10) Away goals scored; 11) Disciplinary record in ascending order (3 points for direct red card, 1 point for yellow card, 2.5 points for red card after two yellows); 12) 2024–25 position (does not apply to final standings); 13) Play-offs. If the teams tied on points did not all play equal number of head-to-head matches, head-to-head criteria are not used to determine the standings.
(C) Champions; (P) Promoted; (Q) Qualified for Promotion Playoffs; (R) Relegated

== Results ==
Home \ Away	ARS	CHA	CHL	CHE	FAK	KAM	NEF	ROD	ROT	SHI	SKA	SOK	SPA	TOR	UFA	URA	VOL	YEN
Arsenal Tula		1–0	0–0	1–1	1–2	1–1	0–0	1–4	2–2	1–1	3–1	3–1	1–2	2–2	2–2	1–2	0–1	2–2
Chayka Peschanokopskoye	0–3		2–1	0–2	2–0	0–2	2–4	0–0	0–6	1–2	1–3	1–0	2–4	0–2	1–1	0–1	1–1	1–4
Chelyabinsk	2–2	1–0		1–1	1–1	3–3	2–0	4–0	1–0	2–2	2–2	3–1	3–3	0–1	2–1	1–2	1–0	0–0
Chernomorets Novorossiysk	1–2	4–1	0–0		0–1	1–0	1–1	1–3	1–4	2–1	3–0	0–1	1–2	0–2	3–2	2–1	2–1	0–2
Fakel Voronezh	1–0	0–0	2–0	0–0		0–0	1–0	1–3	4–0	2–2	0–0	1–0	3–2	2–0	1–0	1–0	2–1	2–0
KAMAZ Naberezhnye Chelny	1–1	2–1	2–1	3–1	1–2		0–0	1–2	1–1	0–0	1–1	0–1	2–0	1–1	3–1	5–1	2–3	5–0
Neftekhimik Nizhnekamsk	1–0	2–3	1–1	4–0	0–2	1–3		1–5	0–0	0–0	1–1	0–0	3–1	0–0	2–0	1–0	2–2	1–0
Rodina Moscow	1–1	5–2	2–0	1–1	2–0	0–0	1–1		0–0	2–1	2–0	2–0	1–3	3–0	1–0	3–1	0–0	2–0
Rotor Volgograd	1–2	5–0	0–2	2–0	1–0	3–0	3–1	2–0		3–0	1–0	1–0	1–2	3–0	1–0	1–1	0–0	0–0
Shinnik Yaroslavl	2–0	4–1	1–0	1–0	0–1	0–0	0–2	1–1	2–0		3–0	0–0	2–2	1–1	1–0	0–1	2–0	1–1
SKA-Khabarovsk	1–3	1–1	1–1	1–0	1–0	1–1	2–0	2–2	1–2	3–1		0–0	1–2	1–0	3–0 (Note: The match was awarded to SKA as Ufa did not arrive for the game.)	0–2	1–1	1–1
Sokol Saratov	1–1	0–0	0–1	1–1	0–1	0–2	0–3	1–3	1–1	0–0	0–2		1–1	1–0	2–2	0–3	1–0	0–4
Spartak Kostroma	1–1	1–1	2–1	3–1	0–1	1–1	1–1	0–2	1–1	1–1	3–0	2–1		0–1	0–1	1–1	1–1	2–1
Torpedo Moscow	1–1	3–2	2–3	1–4	2–2	2–0	3–0	0–2	2–0	0–0	4–1	1–1	0–1		0–0	1–0	2–3	1–0
Ufa	1–2	4–0	0–0	1–0	0–4	0–1	3–2	0–0	1–0	1–0	1–1	2–0	0–0	1–1		2–3	2–1	3–0
Ural Yekaterinburg	2–0	5–0	1–0	3–2	2–0	2–0	1–1	2–1	0–0	0–1	1–2	2–0	1–1	2–0	0–0		4–0	2–4
Volga Ulyanovsk	2–1	2–1	2–2	1–1	0–3	1–2	1–4	1–2	1–2	0–1	1–0	0–1	1–0	2–0	2–0	0–0		2–4
Yenisey Krasnoyarsk	1–0	0–3	3–0	1–0	1–1	1–0	2–0	0–0	0–0	0–0	1–2	1–0	1–0	0–1	1–0	0–2	1–1	

Source: First League (in Russian), Soccerway
Legend: Blue = home team win; Yellow = draw; Red = away team win.

== Positions by round ==
Team ╲ Round	1	2	3	4	5	6	7	8	9	10	11	12	13	14	15	16	17	18	19	20	21	22	23	24	25	26	27	28	29	30	31	32	33	34
Rodina Moscow	11	16	17	14	16	16	13	8	7	7	7	6	7	5	4	4	4	4	3	3	3	3	3	3	2	2	2	2	2	2	2	2	1	1
Fakel Voronezh	4	3	2	2	1	1	2	2	1	3	3	3	2	1	1	1	2	2	1	1	1	1	1	1	1	1	1	1	1	1	1	1	2	2
Ural Yekaterinburg	5	2	1	1	2	2	1	1	2	1	2	2	3	4	3	2	1	1	2	2	2	2	2	2	3	3	3	3	3	3	3	3	3	3
Rotor Volgograd	3	8	9	7	7	6	6	6	6	4	5	5	5	3	5	5	6	5	7	7	7	8	7	7	7	4	4	4	4	4	4	4	4	4
KAMAZ Naberezhnye Chelny	8	6	3	6	3	3	4	4	4	5	6	7	6	7	7	6	5	6	5	6	5	6	6	6	5	5	6	6	6	6	6	5	5	5
Yenisey Krasnoyarsk	18	18	18	18	18	13	11	11	12	15	14	15	15	13	11	11	13	12	12	12	13	14	12	12	12	10	12	8	7	7	7	7	6	6
Spartak Kostroma	17	7	8	5	4	4	3	3	3	2	1	1	1	2	2	3	3	3	4	4	4	4	4	4	4	6	5	5	5	5	5	6	7	7
Shinnik Yaroslavl	16	14	16	17	14	11	10	12	9	9	9	9	10	10	10	10	9	10	10	11	11	11	10	10	11	13	13	10	9	9	8	8	8	8
Torpedo Moscow	14	13	15	16	13	14	16	16	16	16	17	16	17	18	16	17	17	17	16	16	15	13	15	15	13	11	10	12	11	11	11	10	9	9
Chelyabinsk	2	1	5	3	5	5	5	5	5	6	4	4	4	6	6	7	7	7	6	5	6	5	5	5	6	7	7	7	8	10	10	9	10	10
Neftekhimik Nizhnekamsk	12	10	11	9	10	10	14	14	14	11	10	8	9	9	9	9	10	11	11	8	9	9	9	9	8	8	8	11	10	8	9	11	11	11
SKA-Khabarovsk	7	5	4	4	6	8	8	9	11	12	11	10	8	8	8	8	8	8	9	10	8	7	8	8	9	12	11	13	13	14	14	13	13	12
Arsenal Tula	9	9	7	10	8	7	7	7	8	8	8	11	11	11	12	12	11	9	8	9	10	10	11	11	10	9	9	9	12	12	12	12	12	13
Volga Ulyanovsk	15	17	14	15	12	15	12	13	13	10	12	13	13	15	14	15	15	14	15	14	14	15	14	14	15	14	14	14	14	13	13	14	14	14
Ufa	10	15	10	11	11	12	9	10	10	13	13	14	14	14	15	14	12	13	14	15	16	16	16	16	16	16	16	16	15	15	15	15	15	15
Chernomorets Novorossiysk	6	12	13	13	17	18	18	18	15	14	15	12	12	12	13	13	14	15	13	13	12	12	13	13	14	15	15	15	16	16	16	16	16	16
Sokol Saratov	13	11	12	12	15	17	17	17	18	18	16	17	16	17	18	16	16	16	17	17	17	17	17	18	18	18	18	18	18	18	18	18	17	17
Chayka Peschanokopskoye	1	4	6	8	9	9	15	15	17	17	18	18	18	16	17	18	18	18	18	18	18	18	18	17	17	17	17	17	17	17	17	17	18	18

Promotion
Play-offs
Relegation to 2026–27 Russian Second League

Source: everysport.com

== Results by round ==
Team ╲ Round	1	2	3	4	5	6	7	8	9	10	11	12	13	14	15	16	17	18	19	20	21	22	23	24	25	26	27	28	29	30	31	32	33	34
Arsenal Tula	D	D	W	D	D	W	L	W	L	L	D	L	D	D	D	L	W	W	W	D	D	D	L	L	W	W	L	D	L	D	D	D	L	L
Chayka Peschanokopskoye	W	D	D	D	L	L	L	L	L	L	L	D	D	W	L	L	L	L	L	L	D	L	W	D	L	W	L	L	W	L	L	L	L	L
Chelyabinsk	W	W	L	W	L	W	D	D	W	D	W	D	D	D	D	L	L	W	D	W	L	W	D	D	L	L	D	D	L	D	L	W	L	D
Chernomorets Novorossiysk	D	L	L	D	L	L	L	D	W	W	L	W	W	L	D	D	L	L	W	D	W	L	W	D	L	L	D	L	L	L	L	L	W	W
Fakel Voronezh	W	W	W	W	W	W	L	D	W	L	D	D	W	W	W	L	W	W	W	W	W	W	D	L	D	W	W	L	L	D	D	W	D	W
KAMAZ Naberezhnye Chelny	D	W	W	L	W	W	D	W	D	L	D	L	W	D	L	W	W	L	D	D	D	D	L	D	W	D	D	D	L	W	W	W	L	L
Neftekhimik Nizhnekamsk	D	D	D	W	L	L	D	L	D	W	W	W	D	L	D	L	D	D	W	W	D	W	L	W	D	L	L	D	W	W	L	L	D	L
Rodina Moscow	D	L	L	D	D	D	W	W	W	W	L	W	D	W	W	D	W	D	W	D	D	W	W	D	W	W	W	W	D	L	W	W	W	W
Rotor Volgograd	W	L	D	W	D	W	L	W	W	W	D	L	D	W	L	D	L	W	L	L	D	D	D	D	W	W	W	W	W	W	D	D	L	W
Shinnik Yaroslavl	L	D	L	L	W	D	W	D	W	D	D	W	L	L	D	D	W	L	W	D	L	L	W	D	D	D	D	W	W	D	W	W	D	D
SKA-Khabarovsk	D	W	W	D	L	L	D	L	L	D	W	W	W	L	D	W	D	L	D	D	W	W	L	D	L	L	D	D	L	L	L	W	D	W
Sokol Saratov	D	D	L	D	D	L	L	L	L	D	W	L	D	D	D	W	L	D	L	D	L	L	L	L	L	L	L	L	L	L	W	W	D	W
Spartak Kostroma	L	W	D	W	W	W	W	D	W	W	W	D	D	D	L	D	W	L	L	D	L	D	D	D	D	L	W	W	L	W	D	L	D	L
Torpedo Moscow	L	D	L	L	W	L	L	D	D	L	L	W	L	D	D	W	L	D	W	L	W	W	L	W	W	W	D	D	W	L	D	W	D	W
Ufa	D	L	W	L	D	L	W	D	L	L	D	D	D	D	L	W	W	L	L	L	D	L	L	W	W	L	D	D	W	L	L	L	W	W
Ural Yekaterinburg	W	W	W	W	L	W	W	D	D	W	D	L	L	W	W	W	W	W	L	D	D	L	D	W	L	L	W	D	W	W	W	L	W	L
Volga Ulyanovsk	L	L	D	L	W	L	W	D	L	W	L	D	L	L	W	L	L	W	L	W	D	D	W	D	L	W	D	L	D	W	D	L	D	L
Yenisey Krasnoyarsk	L	L	D	L	D	W	W	D	L	L	D	L	D	W	W	L	L	W	D	D	D	D	W	D	W	W	L	W	W	W	W	L	W	L

Source: Soccerstats.com (in English)
W = Win; D = Draw; L = Lose

== Season statistics ==
=== Top goalscorers ===
Rank	Player	Club	Goals
1	(Russia) Artyom Maksimenko	Rodina	17
2	(Albania) Belajdi Pusi	Fakel	16
3	(Russia) Amur Kalmykov	Spartak	15
3	(Russia) Said Aliyev	Rotor	15
5	(Russia) David Karaev	KAMAZ	13
6	(Russia) Ivan Timoshenko	Rodina	11
6	(Russia) Andrey Okladnikov	Yenisey	11
6	(Russia) Ruslan Apekov	Torpedo	11
9	(Russia) Rashid Magomedov	Neftekhimik	10
9	(Russia) Artyom Sokolov	Chayka	10
9	(Russia) Ramazan Gadzhimuradov	Chelyabinsk	10

== Managerial changes ==
Club	Outgoing head coach	Reason for leaving	Time of leaving	New head coach	Date of appointment	Previous club / role
Arsenal Tula	Aleksandr Storozhuk	Contract terminated	Pre-season period	Dmitri Gunko	18 June 2025	Urartu
Ural	Sergei Tomarov	Contract terminated	Pre-season period	Miroslav Romashchenko	23 June 2025	Ural, senior coach
Chernomorets Novorossiysk	Oleg Vasilenko	Contract terminated	Pre-season period	Sergei Pervushin	27 June 2025	Chayka
Chayka	Sergei Pervushin	Contract terminated	Pre-season period	Dmitri Kombarov	17 July 2025	Spartak-2 Moscow
Rodina	Zoran Zeljković	Contract terminated	After Matchday 3	Barseg Kirakosyan (caretaker)	5 August 2025	FC Rodina-M
Torpedo Moscow	Oleg Kononov	Contract terminated	After Matchday 4	Pavel Kirilchik (caretaker)	15 August 2025	Torpedo Moscow, assistant coach
Chernomorets Novorossiysk	Sergei Pervushin	Contract terminated	After Matchday 6	Eduard Sarkisov (caretaker)	24 August 2025	Chernomorets Novorossiysk, senior coach
Torpedo Moscow	Pavel Kirilchik (caretaker)	End of caretaker period	After Matchday 7	Sergei Zhukov (caretaker)	1 September 2025	Torpedo Moscow youth team
Rodina	Barseg Kirakosyan (caretaker)	End of caretaker period	After Matchday 8	Juan Díaz	4 September 2025	Sevilla Atlético, sporting director
Chernomorets Novorossiysk	Eduard Sarkisov (caretaker)	End of caretaker period	After Matchday 8	Vadim Yevseyev	5 September 2025	Leningradets
Torpedo Moscow	Sergei Zhukov (caretaker)	End of caretaker period	After Matchday 9	Dmitri Parfenov	13 September 2025	Aktobe
Fakel Voronezh	Igor Shalimov	Contract terminated	After Matchday 12	Oleg Vasilenko	1 October 2025	Chernomorets Novorossiysk
KAMAZ	Ildar Akhmetzyanov	Contract terminated	After Matchday 13	Anton Khazov	10 October 2025	Pari Nizhny Novgorod youth team, assistant coach
Torpedo Moscow	Dmitri Parfenov	Contract terminated	After Matchday 14	Oleg Kononov	15 October 2025	Torpedo Moscow
Rotor Volgograd	Denis Boyarintsev	Contract terminated	After Matchday 20	Valery Burlachenko (caretaker)	25 November 2025	Serikspor, assistant coach
Rotor Volgograd	Valery Burlachenko (caretaker)	End of caretaker period	After Matchday 21	Dmitri Parfenov	1 December 2025	Torpedo Moscow
Ural	Miroslav Romashchenko	Contract terminated	After Matchday 21	Vasili Berezutsky	11 December 2025	Sabah Baku
Yenisey Krasnoyarsk	Andrei Tikhonov	Contract terminated	After Matchday 21	Sergei Tashuyev	24 December 2025	Akhmat Grozny
Chernomorets Novorossiysk	Vadim Yevseyev	Contract terminated	After Matchday 21	—	—	—
