= Timur Melekestsev =

Russian footballer

Personal information
- Full name: Timur Davidovich Melekestsev
- Date of birth: 3 July 2001 (age 25)
- Place of birth: Novoalexandrovsk, Stavropol Krai, Russia
- Height: 1.90 m (6 ft 3 in)
- Position: Forward

Team information
- Current team: Arsenal Tula
- Number: 23

Youth career
- –2014: Krasnodar
- 2015: CSKA Moscow
- 2016–2019: Dynamo Moscow

Senior career*
Years	Team	Apps	(Gls)
2019–2020	Dynamo Moscow	0	(0)
2019–2020	→ Urozhay Krasnodar (loan)	25	(8)
2020–2022	Slovácko	2	(0)
2020	→ Slovácko B	5	(1)
2021–2022	→ Dynamo Makhachkala (loan)	21	(7)
2022	→ Alania Vladikavkaz (loan)	2	(0)
2022	→ Alania-2 Vladikavkaz (loan)	2	(0)
2023	Energetik-BGU Minsk	10	(1)
2023	Leon Saturn Ramenskoye	14	(8)
2024	Torpedo Moscow	2	(0)
2024–2025	Forte Taganrog	29	(13)
2025–2026	Tekstilshchik Ivanovo	35	(18)
2026–	Arsenal Tula	0	(0)

International career
2017–2018	Russia U-17	10	(2)
- * Club domestic league appearances and goals as of 13 June 2026

Timur Davidovich Melekestsev (Russian: Тимур Давидович Мелекесцев; born 3 July 2001) is a Russian footballer who plays as a forward for Arsenal Tula.

== Club career ==
He made his debut in the Russian Professional Football League for Urozhay Krasnodar on 9 August 2019 in a game against Dynamo Stavropol.

He made his Czech First League debut for Slovácko on 23 January 2021 in a game against Bohemians 1905.

He made his debut in the Russian First League for Alania Vladikavkaz on 24 July 2022 in a game against Rodina Moscow.

He made his Belarusian Premier League debut for Energetik-BGU Minsk on 2 April 2023 in a game against BATE Borisov.
