= Aleksandr Nosov =

Russian footballer

Personal information
- Full name: Aleksandr Romanovich Nosov
- Date of birth: 6 June 1995 (age 31)
- Place of birth: Belgorod, Russia
- Height: 1.72 m (5 ft 8 in)
- Positions: Midfielder; forward

Team information
- Current team: Volgar Astrakhan
- Number: 11

Senior career*
Years	Team	Apps	(Gls)
2012–2013	Salyut Belgorod	13	(0)
2014–2016	Avangard Kursk	37	(6)
2016–2018	Luch Vladivostok	87	(6)
2019	Nizhny Novgorod	12	(0)
2019–2020	Luch Vladivostok	24	(1)
2020–2021	Shinnik Yaroslavl	30	(2)
2021	SKA-Khabarovsk	16	(1)
2022–2023	Volgar Astrakhan	38	(1)
2023–2026	Chelyabinsk	86	(8)
2026	Sibir Novosibirsk	17	(2)
2026–	Volgar Astrakhan	15	(0)

International career
2013	Russia U18	4	(0)
2013–2014	Russia U19	5	(0)
- * Club domestic league appearances and goals as of 15 November 2026

Aleksandr Romanovich Nosov (Russian: Александр Романович Носов; born 6 June 1995) is a Russian football player who plays for Volgar Astrakhan.

== Club career ==
He made his debut in the Russian Football National League for Salyut Belgorod on 19 November 2012 in a game against Neftekhimik Nizhnekamsk.
