= Ramazan Gadzhimuradov =

Russian footballer (born 1998)

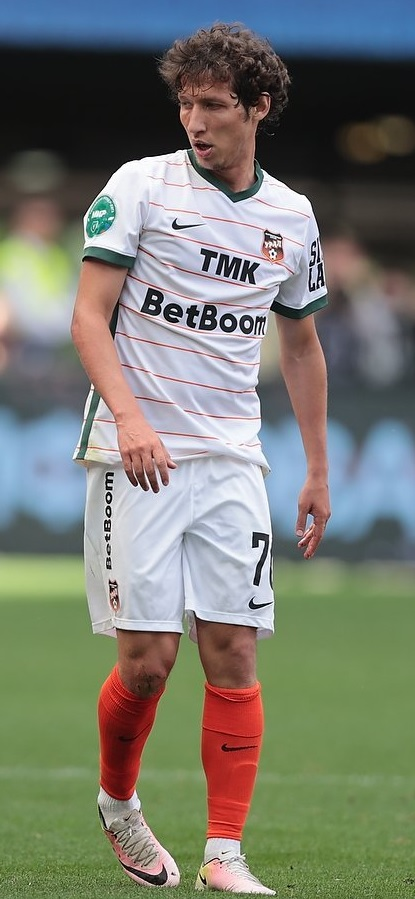
- Gadzhimuradov with Ural Yekaterinburg in 2022

Personal information
- Full name: Ramazan Irbaykhanovich Gadzhimuradov
- Date of birth: 9 January 1998 (age 28)
- Place of birth: Khasavyurt, Russia
- Height: 1.78 m (5 ft 10 in)
- Position: Winger

Team information
- Current team: Chelyabinsk
- Number: 10

Youth career
- –2017: FShM Moscow

Senior career*
Years	Team	Apps	(Gls)
2017–2019	Veles Moscow	43	(12)
2019–2020	SKA-Khabarovsk	45	(8)
2021–2024	Ural Yekaterinburg	45	(4)
2023	→ Dynamo Makhachkala (loan)	10	(0)
2023–2024	→ Rotor Volgograd (loan)	32	(7)
2024–2025	SKA-Khabarovsk	33	(5)
2025–	Chelyabinsk	32	(10)
- * Club domestic league appearances and goals as of 16 May 2026

Ramazan Irbaykhanovich Gadzhimuradov (Russian: Рамазан Ирбайханович Гаджимурадов; born 9 January 1998) is a Russian football player of Kumyk origin who plays for Chelyabinsk. He mostly plays as a right winger, with some appearances as a left winger.

== Club career ==
Gadzhimuradov made his debut in the Russian Professional Football League for Veles Moscow on 19 July 2017 in a game against Spartak Kostroma.

He made his Russian Football National League debut for SKA-Khabarovsk on 7 July 2019 in a game against Shinnik Yaroslavl.

On 15 January 2021, Gadzhimuradov signed with Russian Premier League club Ural Yekaterinburg. He made his RPL debut for Ural on 28 February 2021 in a game against Krasnodar.

On 20 February 2023, Gadzhimuradov joined Dynamo Makhachkala on loan until the end of the season. On 11 July 2023, he moved on a new loan to Rotor Volgograd.

== Career statistics ==
As of 27 November 2022

Club	Season	League			Cup		Continental		Total	
Club	Season	Division	Apps	Goals	Apps	Goals	Apps	Goals	Apps	Goals
Veles Moscow	2017–18	Second League	23	5	0	0	–		23	5
Veles Moscow	2018–19	Second League	20	7	1	0	–		21	7
Veles Moscow	Total		43	12	1	0	0	0	44	12
SKA-Khabarovsk	2019–20	First League	24	4	2	0	–		26	4
SKA-Khabarovsk	2020–21	First League	21	4	3	2	–		24	6
SKA-Khabarovsk	Total		45	8	5	2	0	0	50	10
Ural Yekaterinburg	2020–21	Premier League	11	2	1	0	–		12	2
Ural Yekaterinburg	2021–22	Premier League	24	2	2	0	–		26	2
Ural Yekaterinburg	2022–23	Premier League	10	0	3	0	–		13	0
Ural Yekaterinburg	Total		45	4	6	0	0	0	51	4
Career total			133	24	12	2	0	0	145	26
