= Vladislav Yampolsky =

Russian footballer

Personal information
- Full name: Vladislav Konstantinovich Yampolsky
- Date of birth: 1 November 1999 (age 27)
- Place of birth: Astrakhan, Russia
- Height: 1.89 m (6 ft 2 in)
- Position: Goalkeeper

Team information
- Current team: FC Volgar Astrakhan
- Number: 1

Youth career
- FC Volgar Astrakhan

Senior career*
Years	Team	Apps	(Gls)
2017–	FC Volgar Astrakhan	72	(0)
2020–2021	→ FC Kolomna (loan)	24	(0)
2023	→ SC Astrakhan (loan)	11	(0)
- * Club domestic league appearances and goals as of 15 November 2026

Vladislav Konstantinovich Yampolsky (Russian: Владислав Константинович Ямпольский; born 1 November 1999) is a Russian football player who plays for FC Volgar Astrakhan.

== Club career ==
He made his debut in the Russian Football National League for FC Volgar Astrakhan on 11 September 2021 in a game against FC Spartak-2 Moscow.
