= Vladislav Drogunov =

Russian football player

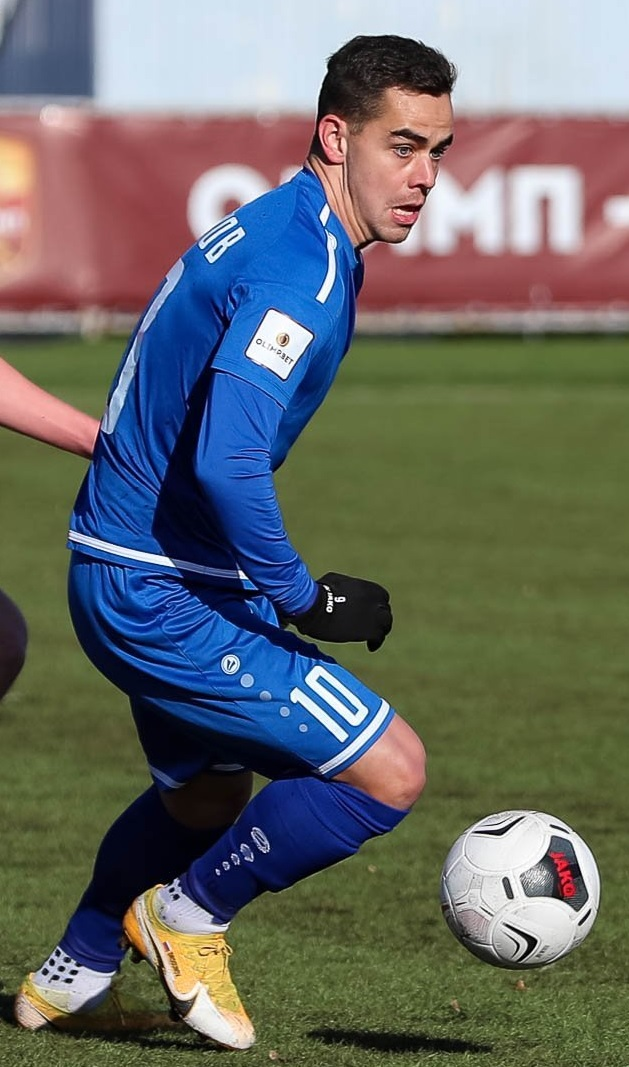
- Drogunov with Dynamo Bryansk in 2021

Personal information
- Full name: Vladislav Valeryevich Drogunov
- Date of birth: 3 February 1996 (age 30)
- Place of birth: Pskov, Russia
- Height: 1.78 m (5 ft 10 in)
- Positions: Midfielder; forward

Team information
- Current team: FC Dynamo Bryansk
- Number: 10

Youth career
- –2007: Strela Pskov
- 2007–2009: Smena St. Petersburg
- 2010–2013: Konoplyov football academy
- 2013–2014: FC Rubin Kazan

Senior career*
| Years | Team | Apps | (Gls) |
| 2014 | FC Pskov-747 | 26 | (1) |
| 2015 | Aves | 1 | (0) |
| 2015–2016 | Tirsense | 19 | (1) |
| 2017–2018 | Canelas Gaia | 23 | (2) |
| 2018–2019 | Tirsense | | |
| 2019–2020 | FC Baltika Kaliningrad | 6 | (0) |
| 2019–2020 | → FC Dynamo Bryansk (loan) | 17 | (2) |
| 2020– | FC Dynamo Bryansk | 191 | (26) |
- * Club domestic league appearances and goals as of 15 November 2026

Vladislav Valeryevich Drogunov (Russian: Владислав Валерьевич Дрогунов; born 3 February 1996) is a Russian football player who plays for FC Dynamo Bryansk.

== Club career ==
He made his professional debut in the Russian Professional Football League for FC Pskov-747 Pskov on 22 April 2014 in a game against FC Sever Murmansk.

He made his Russian Football National League debut for FC Baltika Kaliningrad on 18 April 2019 in a game against FC Sibir Novosibirsk.
