= FC Torpedo Miass =

Russian football club

- Full name: Football Club Torpedo Miass
- Founded: 1942
- General director: Oksana Chistyakova
- Manager: Vladimir Fyodorov
- League: Russian Second League, Division A, Gold Group
- 2026–27: First stage: Silver Group, 4th
- Website: www.torpedo74.com

FC Torpedo Miass (Russian: ФК «Торпедо» Миасс) is a Russian football team from Miass. It played professionally from 1964 to 1970, from 1988 to 2001 and from 2021. It reached the second-highest level, Russian First Division in 1992 and 1993. From 1995 to 2001 it was called UralAZ Miass after the UralAZ company located in the city. Since 2007 the club played in the Amateur Football League. For the 2021–22 season, it was licensed once again for the Russian third-tier.

On 5 November 2023, Torpedo secured the first place in their zone of the 2023 Russian Second League Division B and promotion to the third-tier Division A.

== Current squad ==
As of 11 September 2026, according to the Second League website.

Note: Flags indicate national team as defined under FIFA eligibility rules; some limited exceptions apply. Players may hold more than one non-FIFA nationality.

No.	Pos.	Nation	Player
2	DF	RUS	Aleksandr Balakhonov
4	DF	RUS	Nikita Baksheyev
5	DF	RUS	Yevgeny Lopatko
6	MF	RUS	Yevgeny Ibragimov
7	MF	RUS	Denis Zamyatin
8	MF	RUS	Vasily Palkin (on loan from Chelyabinsk)
11	MF	RUS	Roman Anferov
17	MF	RUS	Ivan Kotelnikov
19	MF	RUS	Maksim Slobodchikov
21	FW	RUS	Vladimir Ulyanovsky (on loan from Chelyabinsk)
22	DF	RUS	Dmitry Kuzmin

No.	Pos.	Nation	Player
23	MF	RUS	Dmitry Prutov
27	GK	RUS	Roman Kovalyov
39	DF	RUS	Andrey Shvedov
44	FW	RUS	Yaroslav Tarasov
46	MF	RUS	Maksim Tarasov
50	MF	RUS	Dmitry Yugaldin
61	DF	RUS	Semyon Stolbov (on loan from Orenburg)
69	MF	RUS	Maksim Yakimenko
77	GK	RUS	Vyacheslav Bezzubov
90	FW	RUS	Yegor Kilin
