= FC Murom =

Russian football club

- Full name: Football Club Murom
- Founded: 2014
- Ground: Viktor Losev Stadium
- Capacity: 2,070
- Chairman: Kirill Mikheyev
- Manager: Sergei Miroshnichenko
- League: Russian Second League, Division A, Silver Group
- 2026: Division B, Group 2, 1st (promoted)
- Website: fc-murom.ru
Home colours	Away colours

FC Murom (Russian: ФК «Муром») is a Russian football team based in Murom. It was founded in 2014 and entered amateur competitions. For 2017–18 season, it received the license for the third-tier Russian Professional Football League after winning their zone of the Russian Amateur Football League.

== Current squad ==
As of 26 September 2026, according to the Second League website.

Note: Flags indicate national team as defined under FIFA eligibility rules; some limited exceptions apply. Players may hold more than one non-FIFA nationality.

No.	Pos.	Nation	Player
1	GK	RUS	Denis Ionov
2	DF	RUS	Ruslan Babayan
5	MF	RUS	Islam Orazayev
7	MF	RUS	Rasil Asaydulin
8	MF	RUS	Shamil Saaduyev
9	FW	RUS	Gadzhimurad Abdullayev
10	FW	RUS	Maksim Andreyev
15	DF	RUS	Yevgeny Livadnov
17	MF	RUS	Nikita Sergeyev
19	MF	RUS	Leonid Kuznetsov
21	MF	RUS	Nikita Kozlovsky
22	MF	RUS	Filipp Dvoretskov

No.	Pos.	Nation	Player
23	DF	RUS	Umar Magomedbekov
50	MF	RUS	Denis Fayzullin
55	DF	RUS	Alikadi Saidov
68	MF	RUS	Elvin Danilov
77	DF	RUS	Islamitdin Abdullayev
81	DF	RUS	Kirill Roshchin
85	GK	RUS	Nikita Zheymo
88	FW	RUS	Ruslan Bolov
89	MF	RUS	Danil Shatalov
91	GK	RUS	Nikita Zavyalov
94	MF	RUS	Aleksey Yevseyev
99	FW	RUS	Anton Penchelyuzov
