= FC Spartak Kostroma =

- Full name: Football Club Spartak Kostroma
- Founded: 1959
- Ground: Urozhay Stadium
- Capacity: 3,000
- Owner: 9 Kostroma companies + Kostroma Oblast
- General director: Aleksey Koryakov
- Manager: Roman Berezovsky
- League: Russian First League
- 2025–26: 7th of 18
- Website: fcspk.ru
Home colours	Away colours

FC Spartak Kostroma (Russian: ФК «Спартак» Кострома) is a Russian association football club from Kostroma, founded in 1959.

== History ==
The highest level it achieved in its history was second-highest Soviet First League, where it played in 1981 and 1982. In the past, the club was called Tekstilshchik Kostroma (1961–1963), Tekmash Kostroma (1964–1966) and Zvolma-Spartak Kostroma (1992). It was dissolved in the summer of 2018 due to lack of financing. For the 2022–23 season, the club was resurrected once again and entered the third-tier Russian Second League. On 28 May 2025, Spartak secured promotion to the second-tier Russian First League.

== Current squad ==
As of 11 September 2026, according to the First League website.

Note: Flags indicate national team as defined under FIFA eligibility rules; some limited exceptions apply. Players may hold more than one non-FIFA nationality.

No.	Pos.	Nation	Player
2	DF	RUS	Nikolai Tarasov
3	DF	RUS	Sergei Bugriyev
5	DF	RUS	Denis Zhilmostnykh
6	DF	IRI	Nader Mohammadi
7	DF	RUS	Kirill Malyarov
8	MF	BLR	Nikita Demchenko
10	FW	RUS	David Karaev
11	MF	GEO	Dimitri Ghurtskaia
13	FW	RUS	Ilya Rubtsov
17	MF	RUS	Dmitry Kaptilovich
18	MF	RUS	Vladislav Kamilov
20	FW	RUS	Mikhail Romanov
21	DF	MNE	Marko Bugarin

No.	Pos.	Nation	Player
22	MF	RUS	Anatoli Nemchenko
47	DF	RUS	Aleksandr Tarasov (on loan from Rostov)
50	GK	RUS	Yegor Shamov
66	MF	RUS	Maksim Nikiforov
68	GK	RUS	Mikhail Gaydash
69	MF	RUS	Kirill Chursin
70	MF	RUS	Ruslan Chervyakov
73	MF	ARM	David Kirakosyan
77	MF	RUS	Ilya Meshcheryakov
82	MF	BLR	Oleg Nikiforenko
87	FW	BIH	Armin Spahić
90	FW	RUS	Amur Kalmykov
96	DF	RUS	Amir Mokhammad

=== Out on loan ===
Note: Flags indicate national team as defined under FIFA eligibility rules; some limited exceptions apply. Players may hold more than one non-FIFA nationality.

No.	Pos.	Nation	Player
—	MF	RUS	David Khubayev (at KAMAZ Naberezhnye Chelny until 30 June 2027)
—	MF	RUS	Yegor Krakhmalev (at Mashuk-KMV Pyatigorsk until 30 June 2027)

== Notable players ==
Had international caps for their respective countries. Players whose name is listed in bold represented their countries while playing for Spartak.

Russia/USSR

- (Russia) Denis Glushakov
- (Russia) Aleksandr Shmarko
- (Russia) Artyom Yenin
- (Soviet Union) Georgi Yartsev

Former USSR countries

- (Armenia) Sergei Avagimyan
- (Belarus) Kirill Kaplenko
- (Tajikistan) Vitaliy Levchenko
- (Ukraine) Dmytro Yakovenko
