= FC Kaluga =

Russian football club

- Full name: Football Club Kaluga
- Nickname: Kosmonavty (the Cosmonauts)
- Founded: 2009
- Ground: Annenki Arena
- Capacity: 3,643
- Owner: Kaluga / Kaluga Oblast / Oleg Mitrofanov
- Chairman: Oleg Mitrofanov
- Manager: Yevgeni Losev
- League: Russian Second League, Division A, Gold Group
- 2025–26: Second stage: 7th
- Website: pfc-kaluga.ru
Home colours	Away colours	Third colours

FC Kaluga (Russian: ФК Калуга) is an association football club from Kaluga, Russia, founded in 2009. The club is playing in the third-tier Russian Second League Division A. The team appeared after uniting two football Clubs from Kaluga: FC MiK Kaluga and FC Lokomotiv Kaluga. The two teams finished 1st and 2d in Russian Amateur Football League Chernozemic Zone championship in 2009 and Kaluga faced the opportunity to promote a football club that could represent the city to Russian Professional Football League so the two teams were united.

== Current squad ==
As of 11 September 2026, according to the Second League website.

Note: Flags indicate national team as defined under FIFA eligibility rules; some limited exceptions apply. Players may hold more than one non-FIFA nationality.

No.	Pos.	Nation	Player
1	GK	RUS	Sergei Yeshchenko
2	DF	RUS	Sergey Krotov
3	DF	RUS	Ivan Osadchy
5	DF	RUS	Vladislav Konovalov
6	MF	RUS	Mikhail Zakharov
7	MF	RUS	Yegor Akimov
8	FW	RUS	Danila Klishchenko
9	MF	RUS	Ilya Sukhanov
10	FW	RUS	Ilya Grishchenko
11	MF	RUS	Amur Balkizov
12	MF	RUS	Yegor Lipayev
14	MF	RUS	Sergei Chibisov
15	MF	RUS	Aleksey Yusupkhodzhayev
17	FW	RUS	Yaroslav Sychyov
18	DF	RUS	Lev Ivanushkin
19	MF	RUS	Nikita Kuzin

No.	Pos.	Nation	Player
27	MF	RUS	Ilyas Muminov
31	MF	RUS	Nikita Pervakov
32	MF	RUS	Igor Sokolov
33	DF	RUS	Daud Daliyev
37	DF	RUS	Dmitry Shevchenko
46	GK	RUS	Yaroslav Rokotyansky
47	MF	RUS	Zakhar Kravtsov
59	MF	RUS	Dmitry Sherstobitov
66	DF	RUS	Yaroslav Makarenko
70	FW	RUS	Gleb Bakharev
77	DF	RUS	Kirill Balashov
78	FW	RUS	Yevgeny Mukhin
88	GK	RUS	Rizvan Tashayev
91	DF	RUS	Yevgeny Lukinykh (on loan from Nizhny Novgorod)
94	MF	RUS	Artyom Nadolsky (on loan from Yenisey Krasnoyarsk)
