= FC Forte Taganrog =

Russian football club

Forte Taganrog
- Full name: Football Club Forte Taganrog
- Founded: 2020
- Dissolved: 2025
- League: Russian Second League, Division A, Silver Group
- 2024–25: 10th
Home colours	Away colours

FC Forte Taganrog (Russian: ФК «Форте» Таганрог) was a Russian football team based in Taganrog. For 2020–21 season, it received the license for the third-tier Russian Professional Football League. The club announced its dissolution on 16 June 2025.

== See also ==
- FC Shakhtyor Donetsk (2025)
