= FC Chayka Peschanokopskoye =

Russian football club

- Full name: Football Club Chayka Peschanokopskoye
- Founded: 1997
- Ground: Chayka Central Stadium
- Capacity: 3,394
- Chairman: Andrei Chayka
- Manager: Vacant
- League: TBD
- 2025–26: Russian First League, 18th of 18 (relegated)
- Website: https://www.fc-chayka.ru/
Home colours	Away colours	Third colours

Logo used till 2017.

FC Chayka Peschanokopskoye (Russian: «Чайка» (Песчанокопское)) is a Russian football team from Peschanokopskoye.

== History ==
It was founded in 1997. Before the 2016–17 season, it was licensed to play in the third-tier Russian Professional Football League. On 24 May 2019, they secured first place in the South zone of the PFL and their first-ever promotion to the Russian Football National League. On 2 July 2021, Russian Football Union decided to relegate Chaika from FNL back to PFL for the 2021–22 season for fixing games in the 2018–19 season.

On 8 June 2024, Chayka secured a second-place finish in the Russian Second League Division A Gold Group and return to the second-tier Russian First League for the 2024–25 season.

In the 2025–26 season, Chayka finished in the First League relegation zone, returning to the Second League. Subsequently, the team failed to receive a license for Second League Division A for financial reasons. It is not clear if the team will enter Second League Division B in 2027.

== Notable players ==
Had international caps for their respective countries. Players whose name is listed in bold represented their countries while playing for Chayka.

Europe

- (Belarus) Alyaksey Hawrylovich
- (Belarus) Igor Stasevich
- (Kazakhstan) Ramazan Orazov
- (Latvia) Vladimirs Kamešs

Asia

- (Kyrgyzstan) **Eldiyar Zarypbekov**
