= 2020–21 FC Rotor Volgograd season =

FC Rotor Volgograd
2020–21 season
- Chairman: Andrei Rekechinski
- Manager: Alyaksandr Khatskevich (until 19 March); Yuri Baturenko (from 20 March)
- Stadium: Volgograd Arena
- Premier League: 15th
- Russian Cup: Round of 32
- Top goalscorer: League: Flamarion (4); All: Flamarion (4)
- Highest home attendance: 18,139 vs Spartak Moscow (26 August 2020)
- Lowest home attendance: 2,118 vs Arsenal Tula (16 December 2020)
- Average home league attendance: 8,845 (1 May 2021)
Home colours	Away colours	Third colours

The 2020–21 season was Rotor Volgograd's first season back in the Russian Premier League, the highest tier of association football in Russia, since 2004. Rotor Volgograd finished the season in 15th position, being relegated back to the Russian Football National League whilst they were also knocked out of the Russian Cup at the Round of 32 stage.

== Season events ==
On 6 August, Nikolay Kuznetsov joined Sokol Saratov on loan for the season, whilst Jano Ananidze joined the club on a one-year contract.

On 10 August, Rotor announced the signing of Armen Manucharyan from Pyunik.

On 13 September, Rotor's home game against Krasnodar was postponed due to 10 cases of COVID-19 within the Rotor squad. On 16 September, Krasnodar were awarded a 3-0 technical victory over Rotor Volgograd.

On 18 September, Rotor's game away to Rostov was postponed due to a COVID-19 outbreak within the Rotor Volgograd squad. On 22 September, Rostov were awarded a 3-0 technical victory over Rotor Volgograd.

On 15 October, Rotor Volgograd signed Andrés Ponce on loan from Akhmat Grozny for the remainder of the season.

On 19 March, Alyaksandr Khatskevich left his role as Head Coach of Rotor. The following day, 20 March, Yuri Baturenko was announced as Rotor's new Head Coach.

On 22 March, Rotor announced that Yury Logvinenko had left the club by mutual consent due to injury.

== Squad ==
Note: Flags indicate national team as defined under FIFA eligibility rules; some limited exceptions apply. Players may hold more than one non-FIFA nationality.

No.	Pos.	Nation	Player
4	DF	RUS	Oleg Kozhemyakin
7	MF	RUS	Nikolai Kipiani
8	MF	RUS	Oleg Aleynik
10	FW	KAZ	Aleksey Shchotkin
11	MF	RUS	Sergei Serchenkov
13	MF	RUS	Sergei Makarov
14	MF	BLR	Ivan Mayewski
17	MF	RUS	Yevgeni Pesegov
20	MF	RUS	Ilya Zhigulyov (on loan from Krasnodar)
21	MF	GEO	Giorgi Arabidze (on loan from Nacional)
22	GK	RUS	Igor Obukhov
23	FW	VEN	Andrés Ponce (on loan from Akhmat Grozny)
25	DF	RUS	Danil Stepanov (on loan from Rubin Kazan)

No.	Pos.	Nation	Player
27	DF	CIV	Cédric Gogoua (on loan from CSKA Moscow)
28	DF	RUS	Azat Bairyyev (Captain)
33	DF	GEO	Solomon Kvirkvelia (on loan from Lokomotiv Moscow)
34	GK	RUS	Nikita Repin
56	DF	RUS	Aleksandr Balakhonov
59	FW	RUS	Yaroslav Shcherbin
70	DF	KAZ	Dmitri Shomko
72	FW	RUS	Kamil Mullin
77	MF	GEO	Zuriko Davitashvili (on loan from Rubin Kazan)
80	DF	RUS	Kirill Dontsov
93	GK	CRO	Josip Čondrić
96	FW	BRA	Flamarion (on loan from Dinamo Batumi)
99	MF	BLR	Vladimir Medved

=== Out on loan ===
Note: Flags indicate national team as defined under FIFA eligibility rules; some limited exceptions apply. Players may hold more than one non-FIFA nationality.

No.	Pos.	Nation	Player
18	DF	RUS	Oleg Nikolayev (at Volgar Astrakhan)
19	MF	RUS	Kirill Kolesnichenko (at SKA-Khabarovsk, on loan from Kairat)

No.	Pos.	Nation	Player
99	MF	RUS	Nikolay Kuznetsov (at Sokol Saratov)

== Transfers ==
=== In ===
Date	Position	Nationality	Name	From	Fee	Ref.
22 June 2020	DF	(Russia)	Oleg Kozhemyakin	Shinnik Yaroslavl	Undisclosed	
22 June 2020	FW	(Georgia (country))	Beka Mikeltadze	Rubin Kazan	Undisclosed	
22 June 2020	FW	(Russia)	Nikolai Kipiani	Rubin Kazan	Undisclosed	
26 June 2020	DF	(Russia)	Valeri Pochivalin	Irtysh Pavlodar	Undisclosed	
3 July 2020	GK	(Russia)	Aleksandr Dovbnya	Orenburg	Undisclosed	
6 August 2020	MF	(Georgia (country))	Jano Ananidze	Anorthosis Famagusta	Free	
10 August 2020	DF	(Armenia)	Armen Manucharyan	Pyunik	Undisclosed	
14 August 2020	DF	(Argentina)	Patricio Matricardi	Asteras Tripolis	Undisclosed	
28 August 2020	GK	(Croatia)	Josip Čondrić	Istra 1961	Undisclosed	
13 January 2021	DF	(Kazakhstan)	Dmitri Shomko	Astana	Free	
13 January 2021	MF	(Belarus)	Ivan Mayewski	Astana	Free	
13 January 2021	FW	(Kazakhstan)	Aleksey Shchotkin	Astana	Free	
31 January 2021	GK	(Russia)	Igor Obukhov	SKA-Khabarovsk	Undisclosed	
31 January 2021	DF	(Kazakhstan)	Yury Logvinenko	Astana	Free	

=== Loans in ===
Date from	Position	Nationality	Name	From	Date to	Ref.
17 July 2020	DF	(Russia)	Danil Stepanov	Rubin Kazan	End of season	
4 August 2020	MF	(Russia)	Ilya Zhigulyov	Krasnodar	End of season	
5 August 2020	DF	(Ivory Coast)	Cédric Gogoua	CSKA Moscow	End of season	
20 August 2020	DF	(Georgia (country))	Solomon Kvirkvelia	Lokomotiv Moscow	End of season	
20 August 2020	MF	(Georgia (country))	Zuriko Davitashvili	Rubin Kazan	End of season	
20 August 2020	MF	(Russia)	Aleksandr Saplinov	Rostov	13 January 2021	
3 September 2020	MF	(Russia)	Kirill Kolesnichenko	Kairat	30 June 2021	
7 September 2020	FW	(Brazil)	Flamarion	Dinamo Batumi	30 June 2021	
15 October 2020	FW	(Venezuela)	Andrés Ponce	Akhmat Grozny	End of season	
17 January 2021	MF	(Georgia (country))	Giorgi Arabidze	Nacional	End of season	

=== Out ===
Date	Position	Nationality	Name	To	Fee	Ref.
23 June 2020	FW	(Russia)	Eduard Buliya	SKA-Khabarovsk	Undisclosed	
7 July 2020	MF	(Russia)	Artyom Samsonov	Shinnik Yaroslavl	Undisclosed	
8 July 2020	MF	(Russia)	Artyom Popov	Nizhny Novgorod	Undisclosed	
8 July 2020	FW	(Russia)	Anzor Sanaya	Yenisey Krasnoyarsk	Undisclosed	
17 July 2020	DF	(Russia)	Ilya Ionov	Dynamo Stavropol	Undisclosed	
9 September 2020	MF	(Russia)	Mukhammad Sultonov	Nizhny Novgorod	Undisclosed	
19 February 2021	FW	(Georgia (country))	Beka Mikeltadze	Xanthi	Undisclosed	

=== Loans out ===
Date from	Position	Nationality	Name	To	Date to	Ref.
6 August 2020	MF	(Russia)	Nikolay Kuznetsov	Sokol Saratov	15 June 2021	
19 January 2021	MF	(Russia)	Oleg Nikolayev	Volgar Astrakhan	End of season	
20 January 2021	MF	(Russia)	Kirill Kolesnichenko	SKA-Khabarovsk	End of season	

=== Released ===
Date	Position	Nationality	Name	Joined	Date	Ref
3 June 2020	DF	(Russia)	Igor Udaly			
3 June 2020	MF	(Russia)	Albert Sharipov	Nizhny Novgorod		
3 June 2020	MF	(Russia)	Azim Fatullayev	Kuban Krasnodar		
18 June 2020	DF	(Uzbekistan)	Vitaliy Denisov	Tom Tomsk	20 September 2020	
9 September 2020	DF	(Russia)	Valeri Pochivalin	Fakel Voronezh	14 September 2020	
12 September 2020	MF	(Georgia (country))	Jano Ananidze			
19 September 2020	DF	(Russia)	Anton Piskunov	Chayka Peschanokopskoye	21 September 2020	
12 January 2021	GK	(Russia)	Aleksandr Dovbnya	Torpedo Moscow	15 January 2021	
15 January 2021	DF	(Argentina)	Patricio Matricardi	Hermannstadt	25 January 2021	
8 February 2021	DF	(Armenia)	Armen Manucharyan	Aktobe	27 February 2021	
22 March 2021	DF	(Kazakhstan)	Yury Logvinenko	Aktobe	5 May 2021	

== Friendlies ==
1 August 2020	CSKA Moscow	0 – 0	Rotor Volgograd	Vatutinki
13:00 SAMT (UTC+4)		Report		Stadium: Training Centre; Attendance: 0
Note: Match played behind closed doors.

== Competitions ==
=== Overview ===
Competition	First match	Last match	Starting round	Record							
Competition	First match	Last match	Starting round	Pld	W	D	L	GF	GA	GD	Win %
Premier League	11 August 2020	May 2021	Matchday 1	29	5	6	18	14	51	−37	17.24
Russian Cup	2020		Round of 32	2	0	0	2	0	6	−6	0.00
Total				31	5	6	20	14	57	−43	16.13

Last updated: 7 May 2021
Source: Competitions

=== Premier League ===
==== Results summary ====
Overall								Home						Away					
Pld	W	D	L	GF	GA	GD	Pts	W	D	L	GF	GA	GD	W	D	L	GF	GA	GD
30	5	7	18	15	54	−39	22	3	2	10	5	23	−18	2	5	8	10	31	−21

Last updated: 16 May 2021.
Source: See Results

==== Results by round ====
Round	1	2	3	4	5	6	7	8	9	10	11	12	13	14	15	16	17	18	19	20	21	22	23	24	25	26	27	28	29	30
Ground	H	A	A	H	H	A	H	A	H	A	H	A	H	A	H	A	A	H	H	A	H	A	H	H	A	H	A	H	A	A
Result	L	D	L	L	L	D	L	L	L	D	L	W	L	D	D	L	L	W	W	W	D	L	L	L	L	L	L	W	L	D
Position	13	15	16	16	16	16	16	16	16	16	16	15	15	15	15	16	16	16	13	13	13	13	13	13	14	15	15	14	15	15

Updated to match(es) played on 16 May 2021. Source: Premier Liga
A = Away; H = Home; W = Win; D = Draw; L = Loss

==== Results ====
11 August 2020 1	Rotor Volgograd	0–2	Zenit St.Petersburg	Volgograd
19:00 SAMT (UTC+4)	Stepanov (yellow card) 49'	Report	Dzyuba 22'; Karavayev (yellow card) 41'; Driussi 79'	Stadium: Volgograd Arena; Attendance: 12,438; Referee: Aleksei Matyunin

15 August 2020 2	Dynamo Moscow	0–0	Rotor Volgograd	Moscow
16:30 SAMT (UTC+4)	Igboun (yellow card) 45'; N'Jie (yellow card) 70'; Kaboré (yellow card) 77'	Report	Makarov (yellow card) 23'; Gogoua (yellow card) 45+'; Kozhemyakin (yellow card) 51'; Zhigulyov (yellow card) 71'; Sultonov (yellow card) 75'	Stadium: VTB Arena; Attendance: 5,981; Referee: Igor Panin

19 August 2020 3	Akhmat Grozny	3–1	Rotor Volgograd	Grozny
19:00 SAMT (UTC+4)	Ponce (penalty missed) 29'; Timofeyev (yellow card) 45+3'; Ilyin 47'; Roshi 53', 61' (yellow card) 53'; Ismael (yellow card) 69'	Report	Mullin (yellow card) 43'; Gogoua (yellow card) 45' (yellow-red card) 71'; Serchenkov 58'; Piskunov (yellow card) 62'	Stadium: Akhmat-Arena; Attendance: 5,811; Referee: Sergey Lapochkin

22 August 2020 4	Rotor Volgograd	1–2	Sochi	Volgograd
21:00 SAMT (UTC+4)	Mullin 52'; Serchenkov (yellow card) 55'; Mikeltadze (yellow card) 83'; Kozhemyakin (yellow card) 90+1'; Stepanov (yellow card) 90+3'	Report	Burmistrov 21', 59'; Noboa (yellow card) 65'	Stadium: Volgograd Arena; Attendance: 14,077; Referee: Sergey Ivanov

26 August 2020 5	Rotor Volgograd	0–1	Spartak Moscow	Volgograd
19:30 SAMT (UTC+4)	Makarov (yellow card) 28'; Kvirkvelia (yellow card) 53'; Bairyyev (yellow card) 66'; Gogoua (yellow card) 71'; Kozhemyakin (yellow card) 90+'	Report	Bakayev (yellow card) 5' (goal) 55' (pen.); Zobnin (yellow card) 65'; Yeshchenko (yellow card) 90+'; Sobolev (yellow card) 90+'; Maksimenko (yellow card) 90+'; Maslov (yellow card) 90+'	Stadium: Volgograd Arena; Attendance: 18,139; Referee: Alexey Sukhoi

29 August 2020 6	Khimki	1–1	Rotor Volgograd	Khimki
21:00 SAMT (UTC+4)	Murnin (yellow card) 23'; Bozhenov (yellow card) 39'; Lomovitsky 56'; Idowu (yellow card) 82'; Troshechkin (yellow card) 90+'	Report	Kvirkvelia (yellow card) 29'; Mullin 32'; Bairyyev (yellow card) 53'; Aleynik (yellow card) 79'	Stadium: Arena Khimki; Attendance: 2,541; Referee: Kirill Levnikov

13 September 2020 7	Rotor Volgograd	0–3	Krasnodar	Volgograd
20:00 SAMT (UTC+4)		Report		Stadium: Volgograd Arena
Note: Match postponed on 13 September due to 10 cases of COVID-19 within the Rotor squad. Krasnodar awarded a 3-0 technical victory on 16 September.

19 September 2020 8	Rostov	3–0	Rotor Volgograd	Rostov-on-Don
20:00 SAMT (UTC+4)		Report		Stadium: Rostov Arena
Note: Match originally scheduled for 19 September, but postponed on 18 September due to a COVID-19 outbreak within the Rotor squad. Rostov awarded a 3-0 technical victory on 22 September.

27 September 2020 9	Rotor Volgograd	1–3	Rubin Kazan	Volgograd
20:00 SAMT (UTC+4)	Manucharyan (yellow card) 23' (yellow-red card) 48'; Kvirkvelia (yellow card) 30'; Nikolayev (yellow card) 40'; Flamarion 61'	Report	Starfelt (yellow card) 20'; Despotović 42'; Zuyev (yellow card) 52'; Kvaratskhelia 59'; Shatov 75' (pen.); Abildgaard (yellow card) 89'	Stadium: Volgograd Arena; Attendance: 8,950; Referee: Vladislav Bezborodov

3 October 2020 10	Ufa	0–0	Rotor Volgograd	Ufa
17:00 SAMT (UTC+4)	Tabidze (yellow card) 13'; Pliyev (yellow card) 44'; Sysuyev (yellow card) 49'; Danchenko (yellow card) 52'; Aliyev (yellow card) 82'	Report	Flamarion (yellow card) 16'; Gogoua (yellow card) 30'; Zhigulyov (yellow card) 45+'; Aleynik (yellow card) 84'; Matricardi (yellow card) 84'; Kolesnichenko (yellow card) 90+'; Pesegov (yellow card) 90+'	Stadium: Neftyanik Stadium; Attendance: 5,247; Referee: Vitali Meshkov

18 October 2020 11	Rotor Volgograd	0–2	Tambov	Volgograd
16:00 SAMT (UTC+4)	Zhigulyov (yellow card) 21'; Davitashvili (penalty missed) 28; Makarov (yellow card) 34'; Stepanov (yellow card) 90'	Report	Haroyan (yellow card) 26'; Karapetian 58'; Ciupercă (yellow card) 62'; Onugkha (yellow card) 70' (goal) 82'; Kabakhidze (yellow card) 90+'	Stadium: Volgograd Arena; Attendance: 6,871; Referee: Vasilly Kazartsev

24 October 2020 12	Lokomotiv Moscow	1–2	Rotor Volgograd	Moscow
21:00 SAMT (UTC+4)	Krychowiak (yellow card) 15' (yellow-red card) 90+'; Rybchinsky 28'; Ćorluka (yellow card) 70'; Miranchuk (penalty missed) 83'	Report	Flamarion (penalty missed) 18' 18'; Ponce 57'; Čondrić (yellow card) 90+'; Stepanov (yellow card) 90+'; Mikeltadze (yellow card) 90+'	Stadium: RZD Arena; Attendance: 4,300; Referee: Sergey Ivanov

1 November 2020 13	Rotor Volgograd	0–1	CSKA Moscow	Volgograd
16:30 SAMT (UTC+4)	Ponce (yellow card) 21'; Flamarion (yellow card) 44'	Report	Sigurðsson (yellow card) 32'; Dzagoev 41'; Tiknizyan (yellow card) 90+3'	Stadium: Volgograd Arena; Attendance: 14,250; Referee: Pavel Kukuyan

7 November 2020 14	Arsenal Tula	1–1	Rotor Volgograd	Tula
17:30 SAMT (UTC+4)	Panchenko 5'; Rasskazov (yellow card) 36'; Dovbnya (yellow card) 59'	Report	Bairyyev (yellow card) 12' (yellow-red card) 37'; Makarov (yellow card) 26'; Stepanov 62'; Davitashvili (yellow card) 67'	Stadium: Arsenal Stadium; Attendance: 1,743; Referee: Stanislav Vasiliev

22 November 2020 15	Rotor Volgograd	0–0	Ural Yekaterinburg	Volgograd
17:30 SAMT (UTC+4)	Stepanov (yellow card) 32'; Kozhemyakin (yellow card) 37'; Davitashvili (yellow card) 62'; Zhigulyov (yellow card) 78'	Report	Bicfalvi (yellow card) 28'; Kalinin (yellow card) 44'; Jovičić (yellow card) 55'; Augustyniak (yellow card) 90+'	Stadium: Volgograd Arena; Attendance: 4,050; Referee: Vladimir Moskalyov

29 November 2020 16	Spartak Moscow	2–0	Rotor Volgograd	Moscow
20:00 SAMT (UTC+4)	Kokorin 15' (pen.); Larsson (yellow card) 60'; Yeshchenko (yellow card) 86'; Gigot (yellow card) 90+'; Zobnin (yellow card) 90+2'	Report	Davitashvili (yellow card) 13'	Stadium: Otkritie Arena; Attendance: 6,429; Referee: Nikolay Voloshin

5 December 2020 17	Krasnodar	5–0	Rotor Volgograd	Krasnodar
20:00 SAMT (UTC+4)	Ari 14', 41'; Vilhena (yellow card) 16'; Kambolov (yellow card) 27'; Suleymanov 43'; Chernikov (yellow card) 60'; Claesson 85', 90+'	Report	Ponce (red card) 16'; Kvirkvelia (yellow card) 41'; Aleynik (yellow card) 45+'	Stadium: Krasnodar Stadium; Attendance: 7,780; Referee: Aleksei Matyunin

12 December 2020 18	Rotor Volgograd	1–0	Ufa	Volgograd
15:00 SAMT (UTC+4)	Aleynik (yellow card) 43'; Kipiani (yellow card) 45'; Mikeltadze (yellow card) 52'; Stepanov (yellow card) 59'; Makarov (yellow card) 66'; Mullin 78'; Davitashvili (yellow card) 81'; Flamarion (yellow card) 84'	Report	Kamilov (yellow card) 42'; Mrzljak (yellow card) 45+'; Sysuyev (yellow card) 46'; Pliyev (yellow card) 50'; Tabidze (yellow card) 65'; Morozov (yellow card) 72' (yellow-red card) 73'; Jokić (yellow card) 90+'	Stadium: Volgograd Arena; Attendance: 2,139; Referee: Vasily Kazartsev

16 December 2020 19	Rotor Volgograd	1–0	Arsenal Tula	Volgograd
19:00 SAMT (UTC+4)	Stepanov (yellow card) 15'; Kozhemyakin (yellow card) 37'; Flamarion 81' (pen.)	Report	Tkachyov (yellow card) 16'; Rasskazov (yellow card) 58'; Kostadinov (yellow card) 73'; Kadiri (yellow card) 82'; Gorbatenko (yellow card) 87'; Khagush (yellow card) 90'	Stadium: Volgograd Arena; Attendance: 2,118; Referee: Igor Panin

26 February 2021 20	Tambov	1–3	Rotor Volgograd	Saransk
20:00 SAMT (UTC+4)	Arkhipov 41'; Avanesyan (yellow card) 90+2'	Report	Bairyyev (yellow card) 10'; Gigashvili 54' (o.g.); Zhigulyov (yellow card) 56'; Ponce 58'; Kipiani 72'	Stadium: Mordovia Arena; Referee: Ivan Sidenkov
Note: Match played at the Mordovia Arena in Saransk instead of Tambov's regular Spartak Stadium.

6 March 2021 21	Rotor Volgograd	0–0	Khimki	Volgograd
17:30 SAMT (UTC+4)	Pesegov (yellow card) 31'; Ponce (yellow card) 51'; Gogoua (yellow card) 88'; Mayewski (yellow card) 90+'	Report		Stadium: Volgograd Arena; Attendance: 5,369; Referee: Sergey Ivanov

13 March 2021 22	Ural Yekaterinburg	1–0	Rotor Volgograd	Yekaterinburg
13:00 SAMT (UTC+4)	Bicfalvi 84'	Report		Stadium: Central Stadium; Attendance: 3,717; Referee: Mikhail Vilkov

17 March 2021 23	Rotor Volgograd	0–4	Rostov	Volgograd
19:00 SAMT (UTC+4)	Zhigulyov (yellow card) 48'; Gogoua (yellow card) 86'	Report	Sowe (penalty missed) 8' 62'; Gigović 41'; Glebov (yellow card) 49'; Almqvist 59'; Kozlov (yellow card) 64'; Saplinov 90+'	Stadium: Volgograd Arena; Attendance: 5,085; Referee: Kirill Levnikov

3 April 2021 24	Rotor Volgograd	0–2	Lokomotiv Moscow	Volgograd
15:00 SAMT (UTC+4)	Gogoua (yellow card) 35'; Pesegov (yellow card) 68'; Makarov (yellow card) 71'	Report	Krychowiak (yellow card) 15' (goal) 21'; Barinov (yellow card) 49'; Mukhin (yellow card) 52'; Rybchinsky (yellow card) 61'; Rybus (yellow card) 69'; Zhemaletdinov 80'	Stadium: Volgograd Arena; Attendance: 14,115; Referee: Igor Panin

12 April 2021 25	CSKA Moscow	2–0	Rotor Volgograd	Moscow
20:00 SAMT (UTC+4)	Ejuke 45+1'; Rondón 70'; Akhmetov (yellow card) 89'	Report		Stadium: VEB Arena; Attendance: 10,240; Referee: Sergei Karasev

17 April 2021 26	Rotor Volgograd	0–3	Dynamo Moscow	Volgograd
17:30 SAMT (UTC+4)	Stepanov (yellow card) 25'; Kipiani (yellow card) 41'; Kvirkvelia (yellow card) 56'	Report	Yevgenyev (yellow card) 42'; Zakharyan (yellow card) 53'; Fomin 57' (pen.); Parshivlyuk (yellow card) 58'; Ordets 76'; N'Jie (yellow card) 82' (goal) 90+'	Stadium: Volgograd Arena; Attendance: 9,101; Referee: Pavel Kukuyan

24 April 2021 27	Zenit St.Petersburg	6–0	Rotor Volgograd	Saint Petersburg
17:30 SAMT (UTC+4)	Kvirkvelia 45+'; Malcom 56'; Mostovoy 65'; Dzyuba 75'; Yerokhin 77'; Sutormin 87' (yellow card) 90'	Report		Stadium: Krestovsky Stadium; Attendance: 24,807; Referee: Vitali Meshkov

1 May 2021 28	Rotor Volgograd	1–0	Akhmat Grozny	Volgograd
15:00 SAMT (UTC+4)	Shchotkin 23' (yellow card) 57'; Gogoua (yellow card) 50'; Čondrić (yellow card) 81'	Report	Sadulayev (yellow card) 41'; Bogosavac (yellow card) 52'; Semyonov (yellow card) 65'; Ismael (yellow card) 67' Iancu (yellow card) 90'	Stadium: Volgograd Arena; Attendance: 7,132; Referee: Stanislav Vasiliev

7 May 2021 29	Sochi	2–1	Rotor Volgograd	Sochi
21:00 SAMT (UTC+4)	Rudenko 9'; Mevlja (yellow card) 66'; Yusupov 90+'	Report	Shchotkin 30'; Zhigulyov (yellow card) 41'; Makarov (yellow card) 65'; Davitashvili (yellow card) 84'	Stadium: Fisht Olympic Stadium; Attendance: 7,340; Referee: Sergei Karasev

16 May 2021 30	Rubin Kazan	1–1	Rotor Volgograd	Kazan
15:00 SAMT (UTC+4)	D.Makarov (yellow card) 20'; Abildgaard (yellow card) 27'; Zotov (yellow card) 31'; Despotović 90+'; Bakayev (yellow card) 90+'	Report	Aleynik (yellow card) 28'; Stepanov (yellow card) 51'; Gogoua (yellow card) 66'; Flamarion 78' (pen.); Zhigulyov (yellow card) 88'; S.Makarov (yellow card) 90+'	Stadium: Ak Bars Arena; Attendance: 12,433; Referee: Vitali Meshkov

==== League table ====
Pos	Team	Pld	W	D	L	GF	GA	GD	Pts	Qualification or relegation
12	Ural Yekaterinburg	30	7	13	10	26	36	−10	34	
13	Ufa	30	6	7	17	26	46	−20	25	
14	Arsenal Tula	30	6	5	19	28	51	−23	23	
15	Rotor Volgograd (R)	30	5	7	18	15	52	−37	22	Relegation to Football National League
16	Tambov (D)	30	3	4	23	19	65	−46	13	Dissolved after the season (Note: On 19 May 2021, FC Tambov announced that most of the staff and players were released from their contracts and the club began the process of liquidation.)

Source: Premier Liga
Rules for classification: 1) Points; 2) Head-to-head points; 3) Head-to-head matches won; 4) Head-to-head goal difference; 5) Head-to-head goals scored; 6) Matches won; 7) Goal difference; 8) Goals scored; 9) Play-off.
(D) Disqualified; (R) Relegated

=== Russian Cup ===
==== Round of 32 ====
Pos	Team	Pld	W	D	L	GF	GA	GD	Pts	Qualification
1	Krylia Sovetov Samara	2	2	0	0	7	1	+6	6	Advance to Play-off
2	Dynamo Stavropol	2	1	0	1	4	4	0	3	
3	Rotor Volgograd	2	0	0	2	0	6	−6	0	

23 September 2020 1	Dynamo Stavropol	3 – 0	Rotor Volgograd	Stavropol
20:00 SAMT (UTC+4)		Report		Stadium: Dynamo Stadium
Note: Match awarded to Dynamo Stavropol.

21 October 2020 2	Krylia Sovetov	3 – 0	Rotor Volgograd	Samara
19:00 SAMT (UTC+4)	Kombarov 33'; Tsypchenko 44'; Golenkov 79'	Report	Pesegov (yellow card) 77'	Stadium: Samara Arena; Referee: Alexey Amelin

== Squad statistics ==
As of match played 16 May 2021

=== Appearances and goals ===
No.	Pos	Nat	Player	Total		Premier League		Russian Cup	
No.	Pos	Nat	Player	Apps	Goals	Apps	Goals	Apps	Goals
4	DF	(Russia) RUS	Oleg Kozhemyakin	20	0	16+3	0	1	0
7	MF	(Russia) RUS	Nikolai Kipiani	15	1	10+4	1	1	0
8	MF	(Russia) RUS	Oleg Aleynik	23	0	20+3	0	0	0
10	FW	(Kazakhstan) KAZ	Aleksey Shchotkin	5	2	5	2	0	0
11	MF	(Russia) RUS	Sergei Serchenkov	17	1	4+12	1	1	0
13	MF	(Russia) RUS	Sergei Makarov	26	0	26	0	0	0
14	MF	(Belarus) BLR	Ivan Mayewski	5	0	4+1	0	0	0
17	MF	(Russia) RUS	Yevgeni Pesegov	25	0	15+9	0	1	0
20	MF	(Russia) RUS	Ilya Zhigulyov	26	0	23+3	0	0	0
21	MF	(Georgia (country)) GEO	Giorgi Arabidze	4	0	0+4	0	0	0
23	FW	(Venezuela) VEN	Andrés Ponce	15	2	11+3	2	1	0
25	DF	(Russia) RUS	Danil Stepanov	22	1	21+1	1	0	0
27	DF	(Ivory Coast) CIV	Cédric Gogoua	22	0	22	0	0	0
28	DF	(Russia) RUS	Azat Bairyyev	16	0	12+4	0	0	0
33	DF	(Georgia (country)) GEO	Solomon Kvirkvelia	19	0	18+1	0	0	0
56	DF	(Russia) RUS	Aleksandr Balakhonov	1	0	0	0	0+1	0
59	FW	(Russia) RUS	Yaroslav Shcherbin	1	0	0	0	0+1	0
70	DF	(Kazakhstan) KAZ	Dmitri Shomko	4	0	4	0	0	0
72	FW	(Russia) RUS	Kamil Mullin	25	3	16+9	3	0	0
77	MF	(Georgia (country)) GEO	Zuriko Davitashvili	20	0	19+1	0	0	0
80	DF	(Russia) RUS	Kirill Dontsov	1	0	0+1	0	0	0
83	DF	(Russia) RUS	Dmitri Vershkov	1	0	0+1	0	0	0
93	GK	(Croatia) CRO	Josip Čondrić	22	0	22	0	0	0
96	FW	(Brazil) BRA	Flamarion	20	4	18+2	4	0	0
99	MF	(Belarus) BLR	Vladimir Medved	4	0	0+3	0	1	0
Players away from the club on loan:
18	FW	(Russia) RUS	Oleg Nikolayev	4	0	1+3	0	0	0
19	MF	(Russia) RUS	Kirill Kolesnichenko	3	0	1+1	0	1	0
Players who appeared for Rotor Volgograd but left during the season:
1	GK	(Russia) RUS	Aleksandr Dovbnya	7	0	6	0	1	0
3	DF	(Armenia) ARM	Armen Manucharyan	7	0	4+3	0	0	0
5	DF	(Russia) RUS	Anton Piskunov	4	0	4	0	0	0
6	DF	(Argentina) ARG	Patricio Matricardi	3	0	2	0	1	0
9	FW	(Georgia (country)) GEO	Beka Mikeltadze	13	0	1+11	0	1	0
22	MF	(Russia) RUS	Mukhammad Sultonov	5	0	3+2	0	0	0
26	MF	(Russia) RUS	Aleksandr Saplinov	2	0	0+1	0	1	0
46	MF	(Russia) RUS	Dmitri Sesyavin	1	0	0	0	0+1	0

=== Goal scorers ===
Place	Position	Nation	Number	Name	Premier League	Russian Cup	Total
1	FW	(Brazil)	96	Flamarion	4	0	4
2	FW	(Russia)	72	Kamil Mullin	3	0	3
3	FW	(Venezuela)	23	Andrés Ponce	2	0	2
3	FW	(Kazakhstan)	10	Aleksey Shchotkin	2	0	2
5	MF	(Russia)	11	Sergei Serchenkov	1	0	1
5	DF	(Russia)	25	Danil Stepanov	1	0	1
5	MF	(Russia)	7	Nikolai Kipiani	1	0	1
5				Own goal	1	0	1
Total					15	0	15

=== Clean sheets ===
Place	Position	Nation	Number	Name	Premier League	Russian Cup	Total
1	GK	(Croatia)	93	Josip Čondrić	6	0	6
2	GK	(Russia)	1	Aleksandr Dovbnya	1	0	1
Total					7	0	7

=== Disciplinary record ===
Number	Nation	Position	Name	Premier League		Russian Cup		Total	
Number	Nation	Position	Name	Booked	Sent off (straight red)	Booked	Sent off (straight red)	Booked	Sent off (straight red)
4	(Russia)	DF	Oleg Kozhemyakin	5	0	0	0	5	0
7	(Russia)	MF	Nikolai Kipiani	2	0	0	0	2	0
8	(Russia)	MF	Oleg Aleynik	5	0	0	0	5	0
10	(Kazakhstan)	FW	Aleksey Shchotkin	1	0	0	0	1	0
11	(Russia)	MF	Sergei Serchenkov	1	0	0	0	1	0
13	(Russia)	MF	Sergei Makarov	8	0	0	0	8	0
14	(Belarus)	MF	Ivan Mayewski	1	0	0	0	1	0
17	(Russia)	MF	Yevgeni Pesegov	3	0	1	0	4	0
20	(Russia)	MF	Ilya Zhigulyov	8	0	0	0	8	0
23	(Venezuela)	FW	Andrés Ponce	4	1	0	0	4	1
25	(Russia)	DF	Danil Stepanov	9	0	0	0	9	0
27	(Ivory Coast)	DF	Cédric Gogoua	10	1	0	0	10	1
28	(Russia)	DF	Azat Bairyyev	5	1	0	0	5	1
33	(Georgia (country))	DF	Solomon Kvirkvelia	5	0	0	0	5	0
72	(Russia)	FW	Kamil Mullin	1	0	0	0	1	0
77	(Georgia (country))	MF	Zuriko Davitashvili	5	0	0	0	5	0
93	(Croatia)	GK	Josip Čondrić	2	0	0	0	2	0
96	(Brazil)	FW	Flamarion	3	0	0	0	3	0
Players away on loan:
18	(Russia)	FW	Oleg Nikolayev	1	0	0	0	1	0
19	(Russia)	MF	Kirill Kolesnichenko	1	0	0	0	1	0
Players who left Rotor Volgograd during the season:
3	(Armenia)	DF	Armen Manucharyan	2	1	0	0	2	1
5	(Russia)	DF	Anton Piskunov	1	0	0	0	1	0
6	(Argentina)	DF	Patricio Matricardi	1	0	0	0	1	0
9	(Georgia (country))	FW	Beka Mikeltadze	3	0	0	0	3	0
22	(Russia)	MF	Mukhammad Sultonov	1	0	0	0	1	0
Total				88	4	1	0	89	4
