= 2019 FNL Cup =

Friendly association football tournament played in Cyprus

Tournament details
- Host country: Cyprus
- Dates: February 8 – 21
- Teams: 16 (from 1 confederation)
- Venue(s): 2 (in 1 host city)

Final positions
- Champions: Avangard Kursk (1st title)

Tournament statistics
- Matches played: 40
- Goals scored: 100 (2.5 per match)
- Top scorer(s): (Russia) Roman Yanushkovsky (Rotor Volgograd); 4 goals

The 2019 FNL Cup was the 8th edition of FNL Cup, a friendly association football tournament played in Cyprus.

== Teams ==
Nation	Team	Location	Confederation
Russia	Rotor Volgograd	Volgograd	UEFA
Russia	Mordovia Saransk	Saransk	UEFA
Russia	FC Murom	Murom	UEFA
Russia	Shinnik Yaroslavl	Yaroslavl	UEFA
Russia	FC Tyumen	Tyumen	UEFA
Russia	Chertanovo Moscow	Moscow	UEFA
Russia	FC Tambov	Tambov	UEFA
Russia	FC Krasnodar-2	Krasnodar	UEFA
Russia	Ural Yekaterinburg	Yekaterinburg	UEFA
Russia	FC Khimki	Khimki	UEFA
Russia	Spartak-2 Moscow	Moscow	UEFA
Russia	Avangard Kursk	Kursk	UEFA
Russia	Fakel Voronezh	Voronezh	UEFA
Armenia	FC Pyunik	Yerevan	UEFA
Latvia	Riga FC	Riga	UEFA
Estonia	FCI Levadia	Tallinn	UEFA

== Group stage ==
=== Group A ===
Team	Pld	W	D	L	GF	GA	GD	Pts
(Russia) Rotor Volgograd	3	3	0	0	6	2	+4	9
(Russia) Mordovia Saransk	3	1	1	1	4	4	0	4
(Armenia) FC Pyunik	3	0	2	1	2	3	−1	2
(Russia) FC Murom	3	0	1	2	3	6	−3	1

- Rotor Volgograd qualified for semifinals.
- Mordovia Saransk qualified for fifth place.
- FC Pyunik qualified for ninth place.
- FC Murom qualified thirteenth place.

=== Group B ===
Team	Pld	W	D	L	GF	GA	GD	Pts
(Russia) Shinnik Yaroslavl	3	2	1	0	3	0	+3	7
(Russia) FC Tyumen	3	1	2	0	3	1	+2	5
(Latvia) Riga FC	3	1	0	2	3	4	−1	3
(Russia) Chertanovo Moscow	3	0	1	2	2	6	−4	1

- Shinnik Yaroslavl qualified for semifinals.
- FC Tyumen qualified for fifth place.
- Riga FC qualified for ninth place.
- Chertanovo Moscow qualified thirteenth place.

=== Group C ===
Team	Pld	W	D	L	GF	GA	GD	Pts
(Russia) FC Tambov	3	3	0	0	8	1	+7	9
(Russia) Ural Yekaterinburg	3	1	0	2	4	7	−3	3
(Russia) FC Khimki	3	1	0	2	3	4	−1	3
(Russia) FC Krasnodar-2	3	1	0	2	2	5	−3	3

- FC Tambov qualified for semifinals.
- Ural Yekaterinburg qualified for fifth place.
- FC Khimki qualified for ninth place.
- FC Krasnodar-2 qualified thirteenth place.

=== Group D ===
Team	Pld	W	D	L	GF	GA	GD	Pts
(Russia) Avangard Kursk	3	2	0	1	5	2	+3	6
(Russia) Spartak-2 Moscow	3	2	0	1	6	3	+3	6
(Estonia) FCI Levadia	3	1	0	2	2	3	−1	3
(Russia) Fakel Voronezh	3	1	0	2	2	7	−5	3

- Avangard Kursk qualified for semifinals.
- Spartak-2 Moscow qualified for fifth place.
- FCI Levadia qualified for ninth place.
- Fakel Voronezh qualified thirteenth place.

== Knockout stage ==
=== 1-4 places ===
Semifinals

February 17, 2019
18:15

Rotor Volgograd (Russia)	1–1	(Russia) Shinnik Yaroslavl
Yanushkovsky 4' (pen.)	Report	Kamilov 49'
Penalties
Zavezen (penalty missed); Samsonov (penalty scored); Sharipov (penalty scored); Vasilyev (penalty scored); Bairyyev (penalty scored); Makeyev (penalty scored)	5–4	Samodin (penalty missed); Nizamutdinov (penalty scored); Aleynikov (penalty scored); Samoylov (penalty scored); Geloyan (penalty scored); Pokidyshev (penalty missed)

Kouklia Community Stadium, Kouklia
Referee: Andrey Fisenko
February 18, 2019
18:15

FC Tambov (Russia)	0–0	(Russia) Avangard Kursk
	Report
Penalties
Ciupercă (penalty scored); Obukhov (penalty scored); Doumbia (penalty scored); Zuykov (penalty missed); Klyonkin (penalty scored)	4–5	Gotsuk (penalty scored); Steklov (penalty scored); Zemskov (penalty scored); Sinyayev (penalty scored); Burnash (penalty scored)

Geroskipou Municipality Stadium, Geroskipou
Referee: Evgeny Kukulyak

Finals

February 20, 2019
15:30

Shinnik Yaroslavl (Russia)	0–2	(Russia) FC Tambov
	Report	Obukhov 20'; Ragulkin 90+4'

Kouklia Community Stadium, Kouklia
Referee: Vladimir Seldyakov
February 20, 2019
18:15

Rotor Volgograd (Russia)	1–1	(Russia) Avangard Kursk
Sanaya 86'	Report	Zemskov 80'
Penalties
Samsonov (penalty scored); Sanaya (penalty missed); Popov (penalty missed); Sharipov (penalty scored); Yanushkovsky (penalty scored)	3–4	Burnash (penalty missed); Steklov (penalty scored); Grigoryev (penalty scored); Mashukov (penalty scored); Zemskov (penalty scored)

Kouklia Community Stadium, Kouklia
Referee: Aleksey Amelin

=== 5-8 places ===
Semifinals

February 17, 2019
15:30

Mordovia Saransk (Russia)	0–2	(Russia) FC Tyumen
	Report	Lebedev 6' (o.g.); Chudin 18'

Kouklia Community Stadium, Kouklia
Referee: Yan Bobrovsky
February 18, 2019
15:30

FC Khimki (Russia)	0–1	(Russia) Spartak-2 Moscow
	Report	Maslov 65'

Geroskipou Municipality Stadium, Geroskipou
Referee: Maksim Matyunin

Finals

February 20, 2019
10:00

Mordovia Saransk (Russia)	0–0	(Russia) FC Khimki
	Report
Penalties
Lebedev (penalty missed); Klimov (penalty missed); Petrov (penalty scored)	1–4	Ryazantsev (penalty scored); Petrusev (penalty scored); Filin (penalty scored); Netfullin (penalty scored)

Kouklia Community Stadium, Kouklia
Referee: Roman Safyan
February 20, 2019
12:45

FC Tyumen (Russia)	2–0	(Russia) Spartak-2 Moscow
Votinov 29'; Mitrović 90+2'	Report

Kouklia Community Stadium, Kouklia
Referee: Evgeni Bulanov

=== 9-12 places ===
Semifinals

February 17, 2019
12:45

FC Pyunik (Armenia)	1–4	(Latvia) Riga FC
Miranyan 41'	Report	Višņakovs 72'; Panić 52'; Karašausks 76', 77'

Kouklia Community Stadium, Kouklia
Referee: Artem Petrenko
February 18, 2019
12:45

FC Krasnodar-2 (Russia)	0–1	(Russia) Fakel Voronezh
	Report	Rusak 84'

Geroskipou Municipality Stadium, Geroskipou
Referee: Marina Krupskaya

Finals

February 21, 2019
15:30

FC Pyunik (Armenia)	2–2	(Russia) FC Krasnodar-2
Miranyan 17'; Stezhko 26'	Report	Stezhko 4' (o.g.); Onugkha 35'
Penalties
Hovsepyan (penalty scored); Ilangyozyan (penalty missed); Talalay (penalty scored); Mkrtchyan (penalty missed); Muradyan (penalty missed)	2–3	Utkin (penalty scored); Sabua (penalty scored); Kolomytsev (penalty scored); Tekuchev (penalty missed)

Geroskipou Municipality Stadium, Geroskipou
Referee: Vera Opeykina
February 21, 2019
18:15

Riga FC (Latvia)	2–2	(Russia) Fakel Voronezh
Biliński 19' (pen.); Panić 86'	Report	Osipenko 25' (pen.); Lebedenko 27'
Penalties
	5–4

Geroskipou Municipality Stadium, Geroskipou
Referee: Anton Frolov

=== 13-16 places ===
Semifinals

February 17, 2019
10:00

FC Murom (Russia)	0–2	(Russia) Chertanovo Moscow
	Report	Tsypchenko 72'; Kolesnichenko 77'

Kouklia Community Stadium, Kouklia
Referee: Anastasia Pustovoitova
February 18, 2019
10:00

Ural Yekaterinburg (Russia)	0–5	(Estonia) FCI Levadia
	Report	Kaljumäe 24'; Podholjuzin 28'; Nesterov 29'; Komlov 32'; Peetson 42'

Geroskipou Municipality Stadium, Geroskipou
Referee: Artur Fedorov

Finals

February 21, 2019
10:00

Chertanovo Moscow (Russia)	3–0	(Estonia) FCI Levadia
Sarveli 9' (pen.)	Report	Zhurakhovskyi 26'; Morelli 29'; Lipp 45'

Geroskipou Municipality Stadium, Geroskipou
Referee: Stanislav Isaev
- Levadia refused to play 2nd half and FA awarded 3–0 for Chertanovo Moscow!
February 21, 2019
12:45

FC Murom (Russia)	2–4	(Russia) Ural Yekaterinburg
Karpukhin 17'; Masalskoe 59'	Report	Bragin 9'; Katrich 13', 35'; Magomadov 38'

Geroskipou Municipality Stadium, Geroskipou
Referee: Alexandra Ponomareva

== Goalscorers ==
4 goals

- (Russia) Roman Yanushkovsky (Rotor Volgograd)

3 goals

- (Nigeria) Benito (FC Tambov)
- (Russia) Viktor Karpukhin (FC Murom)
- (Russia) Vladimir Obukhov (FC Tambov)

2 goals

- (Armenia) Alik Arakelyan (FC Pyunik)
- (Armenia) Artur Miranyan (FC Pyunik)
- (Latvia) Artūrs Karašausks (Riga FC)
- (Netherlands) Othman El Kabir (Ural Yekaterinburg)
- (Russia) Khyzyr Appayev (FC Tambov)
- (Russia) Mikhail Biryukov (Fakel Voronezh)
- (Russia) Anatoli Katrich (Ural Yekaterinburg)
- (Russia) Kirill Kolesnichenko (Chertanovo Moscow)
- (Russia) Aleksandr Makarov (Avangard Kursk)
- (Russia) Dmitri Markitesov (Spartak-2 Moscow)
- (Russia) Kamil Mullin (Rotor Volgograd)
- (Russia) Leon Sabua (FC Krasnodar-2)
- (Russia) Mikhail Zemskov (Avangard Kursk)
- (Serbia) Stefan Panić (Riga FC)
- (Ukraine) Ihor Zhurakhovskyi (FCI Levadia)

1 goal

- (Azerbaijan) Kamran Aliyev (FC Khimki)
- (Belarus) Filipp Ivanov (Riga FC)
- (Belarus) Sergey Rusak (Fakel Voronezh)
- (Brazil) João Morelli Neto (FCI Levadia)
- (Bulgaria) Nikolay Dimitrov (Ural Yekaterinburg)
- (Estonia) Marek Kaljumäe (FCI Levadia)
- (Estonia) Artjom Komlov (FCI Levadia)
- (Estonia) Marko Lipp (FCI Levadia)
- (Estonia) Rasmus Peetson (FCI Levadia)
- (Estonia) Maksim Podholjuzin (FCI Levadia)
- (Estonia) Mark Oliver Roosnupp (FCI Levadia)
- (Latvia) Vladislavs Fjodorovs (Riga FC)
- (Latvia) Oļegs Laizāns (Riga FC)
- (Latvia) Aleksejs Višņakovs (Riga FC)
- (Montenegro) Filip Mitrović (FC Tyumen)
- (Poland) Kamil Biliński (Riga FC)
- (Russia) Vladislav Adayev (Mordovia Saransk)
- (Russia) Nikita Artemenko (Ural Yekaterinburg)
- (Russia) Soltmurad Bakayev (Spartak-2 Moscow)
- (Russia) Vladislav Bragin (Ural Yekaterinburg)
- (Russia) Eduard Buliya (Shinnik Yaroslavl)
- (Russia) Oleg Chernyshov (FC Tambov)
- (Russia) Ivan Chudin (FC Tyumen)
- (Russia) Kirill Folmer (Spartak-2 Moscow)
- (Russia) Maksim Grigoryev (Avangard Kursk)
- (Russia) Vladislav Kamilov (Shinnik Yaroslavl)
- (Russia) Nikita Kirsanov (Mordovia Saransk)
- (Russia) Ilya Kukharchuk (FC Khimki)
- (Russia) Igor Lebedenko (Fakel Voronezh)
- (Russia) Vladimir Lobkaryov (Rotor Volgograd)
- (Russia) Chingiz Magomadov (Ural Yekaterinburg)
- (Russia) Vladislav Masalskoe (FC Murom)
- (Russia) Pavel Maslov (Spartak-2 Moscow)
- (Russia) Bogdan Mishukov (FC Khimki)
- (Russia) Ruslan Mukhametshin (Mordovia Saransk)
- (Russia) Ruslan Navletov (Mordovia Saransk)
- (Russia) Kirill Nesterov (FCI Levadia)
- (Russia) German Onugkha (FC Krasnodar-2)
- (Russia) Maksim Osipenko (Fakel Voronezh)
- (Russia) Yevgeni Ragulkin (FC Tambov)
- (Russia) Aleksandr Rudenko (Spartak-2 Moscow)
- (Russia) Anzor Sanaya (Rotor Volgograd)
- (Russia) Vladislav Sarveli (Chertanovo Moscow)
- (Russia) Aleksandr Soldatenkov (Chertanovo Moscow)
- (Russia) Vitali Stezhko (FC Krasnodar-2)
- (Russia) Dmitri Tsypchenko (Chertanovo Moscow)
- (Russia) Maksim Votinov (FC Tyumen)
- (Russia) Aleksandr Zakuskin (FC Murom)
- (Serbia) Vladan Milosavljev (FC Tyumen)

1 own goal

- (Russia) Yuri Lebedev (Mordovia Saransk) with FC Tyumen.
- (Russia) Vitali Stezhko (FC Krasnodar-2) with FC Pyunik.

== Final places ==
Rank	Team
1	(Russia) Avangard Kursk
2	(Russia) Rotor Volgograd
3	(Russia) FC Tambov
4	(Russia) Shinnik Yaroslavl
5	(Russia) FC Tyumen
6	(Russia) Spartak-2 Moscow
7	(Russia) FC Khimki
8	(Russia) Mordovia Saransk
9	(Latvia) Riga FC
10	(Russia) Fakel Voronezh
11	(Russia) FC Krasnodar-2
12	(Armenia) FC Pyunik
13	(Russia) Chertanovo Moscow
14	(Estonia) FCI Levadia
15	(Russia) Ural Yekaterinburg
16	(Russia) FC Murom

== Awards ==
The following awards were given at the conclusion of the tournament.

Best Goalkeeper	Best Defender	Best Midfielder	Best Forward	Best Player
(Russia) Aleksandr Sautin	(Russia) Kirill Gotsuk	(Russia) Mikhail Zemskov	(Russia) Kamil Mullin	(Russia) Roman Yanushkovsky
