= Ilya Zhigulyov =

Russian footballer

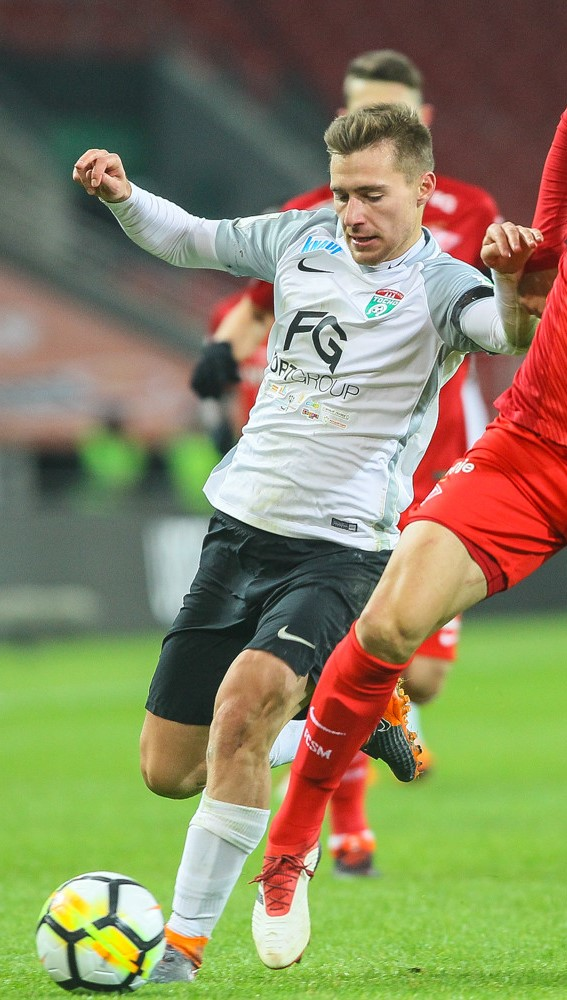
- Zhigulyov with Tosno in 2018

Personal information
- Full name: Ilya Konstantinovich Zhigulyov
- Date of birth: 1 February 1996 (age 30)
- Place of birth: Severskaya, Russia
- Height: 1.76 m (5 ft 9 in)
- Position: Midfielder

Team information
- Current team: Arsenal Tula
- Number: 10

Youth career
- Krasnodar Krai Football Academy
- 2013–2016: Krasnodar

Senior career*
Years	Team	Apps	(Gls)
2013–2021	Krasnodar-2	88	(8)
2016	→ Milsami Orhei (loan)	12	(3)
2017–2021	Krasnodar	17	(0)
2018	→ Tosno (loan)	10	(0)
2018–2019	→ Ural Yekaterinburg (loan)	5	(0)
2020–2021	→ Rotor Volgograd (loan)	26	(0)
2021–2022	Zagłębie Lubin	13	(0)
2022–2025	Pari NN	25	(0)
2025	KAMAZ Naberezhnye Chelny	9	(0)
2025–2026	Chernomorets Novorossiysk	30	(1)
2026–	Arsenal Tula	0	(0)

International career^{‡}
2017–2018	Russia U21	17	(2)
- * Club domestic league appearances and goals as of 16 May 2026 ‡ National team caps and goals as of 16 October 2018

Ilya Konstantinovich Zhigulyov (Russian: Илья Константинович Жигулёв; born 1 February 1996) is a Russian footballer who plays as a central midfielder for Arsenal Tula.

== Club career ==
He made his professional debut in the Russian Professional Football League for FC Krasnodar-2 on 1 November 2013 in a game against FC Druzhba Maykop.

He made his debut for the main squad of FC Krasnodar on 28 February 2017 in a Russian Cup game against FC Ural Yekaterinburg. He made his Russian Premier League debut for Krasnodar on 5 March 2017 in a game against FC Spartak Moscow.

On 9 February 2018, he joined FC Tosno on loan until the end of the 2017–18 season. He played as FC Tosno won the 2017–18 Russian Cup final against FC Avangard Kursk on 9 May 2018 in the Volgograd Arena.

On 30 August 2018, he signed with FC Ural Yekaterinburg for another season-long loan, reuniting with his former Tosno coach Dmytro Parfenov.

On 4 August 2020, he joined FC Rotor Volgograd on loan for the 2020–21 season.

On 20 August 2021, he signed a two-year contract with the Polish club Zagłębie Lubin. On 20 April 2022, he left the club by mutual consent.

On 1 September 2022, Zhigulyov moved to Russian Premier League club Pari NN on a two-year contract. On 23 January 2025, Zhigulyov left Pari NN by mutual consent.

== Honours ==
=== Club ===
Tosno

- Russian Cup: 2017–18

== Career statistics ==
As of match played 16 May 2026

Club	Season	League			Cup		Continental		Other		Total	
Club	Season	Division	Apps	Goals	Apps	Goals	Apps	Goals	Apps	Goals	Apps	Goals
Krasnodar-2	2013–14	Russian Second League	12	1	–		–		–		12	1
Krasnodar-2	2014–15	Russian Second League	17	3	–		–		–		17	3
Krasnodar-2	2015–16	Russian Second League	24	2	–		–		4 (Note: Appearances in the FNL Cup)	0	28	2
Krasnodar-2	2016–17	Russian Second League	2	0	–		–		–		2	0
Krasnodar-2	2017–18	Russian Second League	4	1	–		–		–		4	1
Krasnodar-2	2018–19	Russian First League	1	0	–		–		–		1	0
Krasnodar-2	2019–20	Russian First League	24	1	–		–		–		24	1
Krasnodar-2	2020–21	Russian First League	1	0	–		–		–		1	0
Krasnodar-2	2021–22	Russian First League	3	0	–		–		–		3	0
Krasnodar-2	Total		88	8	0	0	0	0	4	0	92	8
Milsami Orhei (loan)	2016–17	Divizia Națională	12	3	–		–		–		12	3
Krasnodar	2016–17	Russian Premier League	7	0	1	0	1 (Note: Appearance in the UEFA Europa League)	0	–		9	0
Krasnodar	2017–18	Russian Premier League	8	0	0	0	4	0	–		12	0
Krasnodar	2018–19	Russian Premier League	2	0	–		–		–		2	0
Krasnodar	2019–20	Russian Premier League	0	0	0	0	0	0	–		0	0
Krasnodar	Total		17	0	1	0	5	0	0	0	23	0
Tosno (loan)	2017–18	Russian Premier League	10	0	3	0	–		–		13	0
Ural Yekaterinburg (loan)	2018–19	Russian Premier League	5	0	2	1	–		2	0	9	1
Rotor Volgograd (loan)	2020–21	Russian Premier League	26	0	0	0	–		–		26	0
Zagłębie Lubin	2021–22	Ekstraklasa	13	0	2	0	–		–		15	0
Nizhny Novgorod	2022–23	Russian Premier League	12	0	3	0	–		2 (Note: Appearances in Relegation playoffs)	0	17	0
Nizhny Novgorod	2023–24	Russian Premier League	13	0	3	0	–		0 (Note: Appearances in Relegation playoffs)	0	16	0
Nizhny Novgorod	Total		25	0	6	0	0	0	0	0	33	0
KAMAZ	2024–25	Russian First League	9	0	–		–		–		9	0
Chernomorets	2025–26	Russian First League	30	1	1	0	–		–		31	1
Career total			235	12	15	1	5	0	8	0	263	13
