= Mukhammad Sultonov =

Tajik-Russian footballer (born 1992)

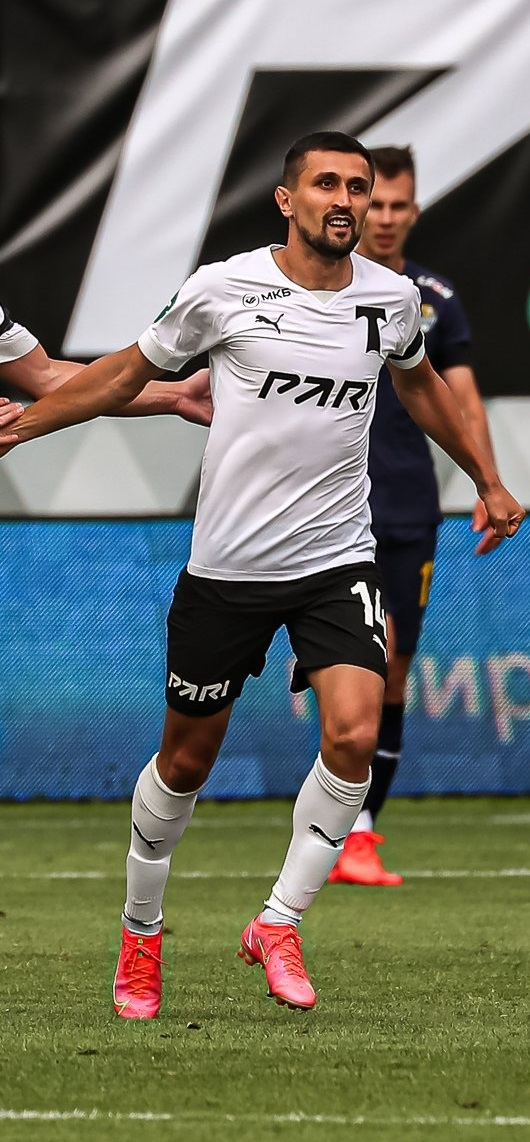
- Sultonov with Torpedo Moscow in 2022

Personal information
- Full name: Mukhammad Imomaliyevich Sultonov
- Date of birth: 22 December 1992 (age 33)
- Place of birth: Yovon, Tajikistan
- Height: 1.76 m (5 ft 9 in)
- Position: Midfielder

Team information
- Current team: KAMAZ Naberezhnye Chelny
- Number: 28

Youth career
- 2002–2006: DYuSSh №1 Kamenka
- 2007–2011: CSKA Moscow

Senior career*
Years	Team	Apps	(Gls)
2012–2013	Lokomotiv-2 Moscow	55	(15)
2014	Spartak Nalchik	12	(0)
2014–2015	Tosno	31	(1)
2015–2017	Shinnik Yaroslavl	68	(7)
2017–2020	Rotor Volgograd	82	(19)
2020–2021	Nizhny Novgorod	30	(7)
2021–2022	Torpedo Moscow	39	(15)
2023–2024	Rodina Moscow	34	(4)
2024	Shinnik Yaroslavl	14	(0)
2025–	KAMAZ Naberezhnye Chelny	40	(5)

International career
2010	Russia U20	1	(0)
- * Club domestic league appearances and goals as of 16 May 2026

Mukhammad Imomaliyevich Sultonov (Russian: Мухаммад Имомалиевич Султонов; born 22 December 1992) is a Russian and Tajikistani footballer who plays for KAMAZ Naberezhnye Chelny.

== Club career ==
He made his debut in the Russian Second Division for Lokomotiv-2 Moscow on 22 April 2012 in a game against Volga Tver.

He made his Russian Football National League debut for Spartak Nalchik on 9 March 2014 in a game against SKA-Energiya Khabarovsk.

He made his Russian Premier League debut for Rotor Volgograd on 11 August 2020 in a game against Zenit Saint Petersburg.

On 8 September 2020, his contract with Rotor was terminated by mutual consent. On the next day, he signed a 2-year contract with Nizhny Novgorod.

== Honours ==
Torpedo Moscow

- Russian Football National League : 2021-22

== Career statistics ==
As of 16 May 2026

Club	Season	League			Cup		Other		Total	
Club	Season	Division	Apps	Goals	Apps	Goals	Apps	Goals	Apps	Goals
Lokomotiv-2 Moscow	2011–12	Russian Second League	9	1	—		—		9	1
Lokomotiv-2 Moscow	2012–13	Russian Second League	26	10	4	3	—		30	13
Lokomotiv-2 Moscow	2013–14	Russian Second League	20	4	1	0	—		21	4
Lokomotiv-2 Moscow	Total		55	15	5	3	0	0	60	18
Spartak Nalchik	2013–14	Russian First League	12	0	—		—		12	0
Tosno	2014–15	Russian First League	31	1	3	0	5 (Note: One appearance in promotion play-offs, four appearances in FNL Cup)	0	39	1
Shinnik Yaroslavl	2015–16	Russian First League	34	3	1	0	4 (Note: Appearances in FNL Cup)	0	39	3
Shinnik Yaroslavl	2016–17	Russian First League	34	4	0	0	5	0	39	4
Shinnik Yaroslavl	Total		68	7	1	0	9	0	78	7
Rotor Volgograd	2017–18	Russian First League	36	6	0	0	4	0	40	6
Rotor Volgograd	2018–19	Russian First League	15	4	0	0	5	0	20	4
Rotor Volgograd	2019–20	Russian First League	26	9	0	0	5	1	31	10
Rotor Volgograd	2020–21	Russian Premier League	5	0	0	0	—		5	0
Rotor Volgograd	Total		82	19	0	0	14	1	96	20
Nizhny Novgorod	2020–21	Russian First League	30	7	1	0	—		31	7
Torpedo Moscow	2021–22	Russian First League	30	15	1	0	—		31	15
Torpedo Moscow	2022–23	Russian Premier League	9	0	3	0	—		12	0
Torpedo Moscow	Total		39	15	4	0	0	0	43	15
Rodina Moscow	2022–23	Russian First League	11	2	—		0	0	11	2
Rodina Moscow	2023–24	Russian First League	23	2	1	0	—		24	2
Rodina Moscow	Total		34	4	1	0	0	0	35	4
Shinnik Yaroslavl	2024–25	Russian First League	14	0	3	0	—		17	0
KAMAZ	2024–25	Russian First League	12	1	—		—		12	1
KAMAZ	2025–26	Russian First League	28	4	1	0	—		29	4
KAMAZ	Total		40	5	1	0	0	0	41	5
Career total			405	73	19	3	28	1	452	77
