= Aleksandr Sautin =

Russian footballer

Personal information
- Full name: Aleksandr Yuryevich Sautin
- Date of birth: 30 January 1988 (age 38)
- Place of birth: Moscow, Russian SFSR
- Height: 1.93 m (6 ft 4 in)
- Position: Goalkeeper

Senior career*
Years	Team	Apps	(Gls)
2006–2007	FC Lokomotiv Moscow	0	(0)
2007	FC SOYUZ-Gazprom Izhevsk	13	(0)
2008	FC Alyans-CSKA Vnukovo		
2009	FC Ryazan	10	(0)
2010	FC SOYUZ-Gazprom Izhevsk	20	(0)
2011–2013	FC Metallurg-Kuzbass Novokuznetsk	40	(0)
2013–2017	FC Fakel Voronezh	77	(0)
2017–2019	FC Avangard Kursk	45	(0)
2020–2021	FC Fakel Voronezh	34	(0)
2022–2023	FC SKA Rostov-on-Don	29	(0)
- * Club domestic league appearances and goals

Aleksandr Yuryevich Sautin (Russian: Александр Юрьевич Саутин; born 30 January 1988) is a Russian former professional football player.

== Club career ==
He made his Russian Football National League debut for FC Metallurg-Kuzbass Novokuznetsk on 10 July 2012 in a game against FC Neftekhimik Nizhnekamsk.

== Honours ==
Club

- FNL Cup:2019

Individual

- Russian Second Division, Zone Ural-Povolzhye best goalkeeper: 2010.
- FNL Cup Best Goalkeaper: 2019
