= Oleg Kozhemyakin =

Russian footballer

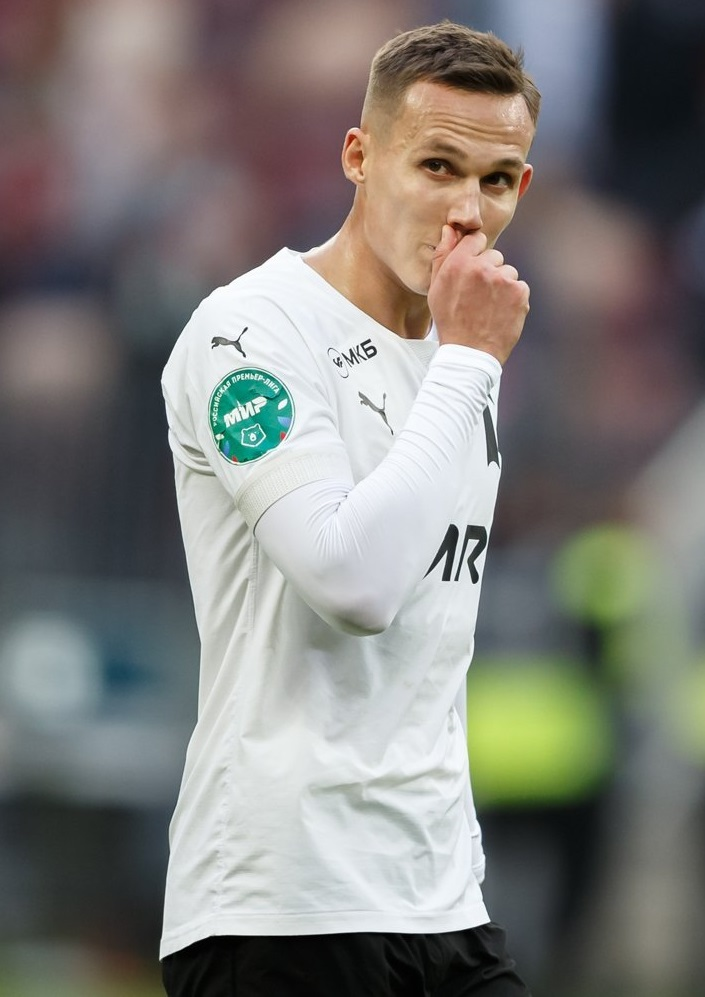
- Kozhemyakin with Torpedo Moscow in 2022

Personal information
- Full name: Oleg Andreyevich Kozhemyakin
- Date of birth: 30 May 1995 (age 31)
- Place of birth: Kryvyi Rih, Ukraine
- Height: 1.84 m (6 ft 0 in)
- Position: Centre-back

Team information
- Current team: Sochi
- Number: 22

Youth career
- 2000–2005: Kryvbas Kryvyi Rih
- 2005–2013: SDYuSShOR-63 Smena Moscow
- 2013: Lokomotiv Moscow

Senior career*
Years	Team	Apps	(Gls)
2013–2014	Kvazar Moscow (amateur)		
2014–2017	Metallurg Lipetsk	72	(4)
2017–2018	Lokomotiv-Kazanka Moscow	24	(1)
2018–2020	Shinnik Yaroslavl	62	(1)
2020–2021	Rotor Volgograd	19	(0)
2021–2023	Torpedo Moscow	56	(1)
2023–2024	SKA-Khabarovsk	31	(6)
2024–	Sochi	23	(2)
2025–2026	→ Torpedo Moscow (loan)	11	(0)
2026	→ SKA-Khabarovsk (loan)	11	(0)
- * Club domestic league appearances and goals as of 16 May 2026

Oleg Andreyevich Kozhemyakin (Russian: Олег Андреевич Кожемякин; born 30 May 1995) is a Russian professional football player who plays for Sochi.

== Club career ==
He made his professional debut in the Russian Professional Football League for Metallurg Lipetsk on 2 August 2014 in a game against Arsenal-2 Tula.

He made his Russian Football National League debut for Shinnik Yaroslavl on 17 July 2018 in a game against Avangard Kursk.

He made his Russian Premier League debut for Rotor Volgograd on 11 August 2020 in a game against Zenit Saint Petersburg.

On 11 September 2025, Kozhemyakin returned to Torpedo Moscow on loan. On 22 January 2026, he moved on a new loan to SKA-Khabarovsk.

== Honours ==
Torpedo Moscow

- Russian Football National League : 2021-22

== Career statistics ==
As of 31 May 2025

Club	Season	League			Cup		Continental		Other		Total	
Club	Season	Division	Apps	Goals	Apps	Goals	Apps	Goals	Apps	Goals	Apps	Goals
Metallurg Lipetsk	2014–15	Russian Second League	24	0	1	0	–		–		25	0
Metallurg Lipetsk	2015–16	Russian Second League	25	1	3	0	–		–		28	1
Metallurg Lipetsk	2016–17	Russian Second League	23	3	2	1	–		–		25	4
Metallurg Lipetsk	Total		72	4	6	1	0	0	0	0	78	5
Lokomotiv-Kazanka	2017–18	Russian Second League	24	1	–		–		4 (Note: Appearances in FNL Cup)	0	28	1
Shinnik Yaroslavl	2018–19	Russian First League	36	0	1	0	–		5	0	42	0
Shinnik Yaroslavl	2019–20	Russian First League	26	1	2	0	–		4	0	32	1
Shinnik Yaroslavl	Total		62	1	3	0	0	0	9	0	74	1
Rotor Volgograd	2020–21	Russian Premier League	19	0	1	0	–		–		20	0
Torpedo Moscow	2021–22	Russian First League	30	1	1	0	–		–		31	1
Torpedo Moscow	2022–23	Russian Premier League	26	0	7	0	–		–		33	0
Torpedo Moscow	Total		56	1	8	0	0	0	0	0	64	1
SKA-Khabarovsk	2023–24	Russian First League	31	6	2	0	–		–		33	6
Sochi	2024–25	Russian First League	23	2	0	0	–		2 (Note: Appearances in promotion play-offs)	0	25	2
Career total			287	15	20	1	0	0	15	0	322	16
