= Geroskipou FC =

Cypriot football club

- Founded: 2013; 12 years ago
- Ground: Geroskipou Municipality Stadium
- League: Third Division
- 2022–23: STOK Elite Division, 1st (promoted)

Geroskipou FC (Greek: Γεροσκήπου) is a Cypriot association football club based in Geroskipou. It was founded in 2013 as Koloni Geroskipou FC (Greek: Κολώνη Γεροσκήπου). The name changed in 2017.

It participated in the STOK Elite Division for the first time in 2016 (2016-17 STOK Elite Division). They won the STOK Elite Division in 2023 and were promoted to the Cypriot Third Division.

Following the disbandment of the Ukrainian club FC Peremoha Dnipro in the summer of 2022, its former owner Femis Sagirov bought the club. Sagirov left the club in March 2024 to acquire Peyia 2014.
