= Kamil Mullin =

Russian footballer (born 1994)

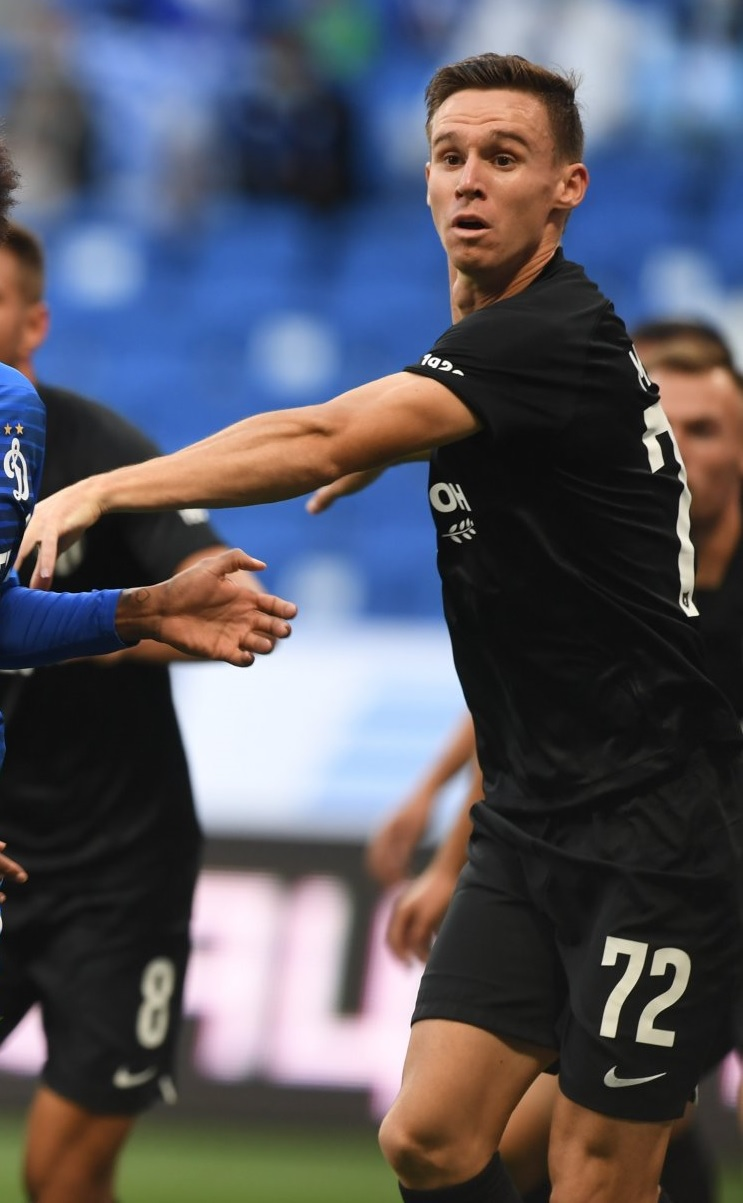
- Mullin with Rotor Volgograd in 2020

Personal information
- Full name: Kamil Shamilevich Mullin
- Date of birth: 5 January 1994 (age 32)
- Place of birth: Moscow, Russia
- Height: 1.78 m (5 ft 10 in)
- Position: Forward

Team information
- Current team: Znamya Truda

Youth career
- 2010–2012: Lokomotiv Moscow

Senior career*
Years	Team	Apps	(Gls)
2012–2013	Lokomotiv Moscow	0	(0)
2014–2017	Rubin Kazan	6	(1)
2015–2016	→ Sokol Saratov (loan)	31	(5)
2016–2017	→ Neftekhimik Nizhnekamsk (loan)	21	(2)
2018	Tyumen	9	(1)
2018–2022	Rotor Volgograd	111	(22)
2022–2023	Rubin Kazan	11	(0)
2023	→ Volgar Astrakhan (loan)	13	(1)
2023–2024	Krasnodar-2	36	(6)
2024–2025	Ufa	24	(1)
2025	Broke Boys		
2025–2026	2DROTS Moscow		
2026	Saturn Ramenskoye	12	(0)
2026–	Znamya Truda (amateur)		

International career^{‡}
2013	Russia U-19	5	(0)
2014–2016	Russia U-21	5	(3)
- * Club domestic league appearances and goals as of 20 June 2026 ‡ National team caps and goals as of 23 January 2016

Kamil Shamilevich Mullin (Tatar: Камил Шамил улы Муллин, Russian: Камиль Шамилевич Муллин; born 5 January 1994) is a Russian professional football player who plays as a forward for Znamya Truda.

== Club career ==
=== Lokomotiv ===
Mullin joined Lokomotiv academy at 16 years, and two years later made it to the youth squad. In total, he played 53 games for Lokomotiv U21 and scored 23 goals.
He made his debut for Lokomotiv first team in the 2012–13 Russian Cup game vs Torpedo Armavir on 26 September 2012.
In March 2013, Mullin for the first time was included into team sheet for the League match vs Rubin. In the same month he was nominated for Lokomotiv Player of the Month and won this prize.

=== Rubin ===
On 1 February 2014, Lokomotiv and Rubin announced an agreement for player's transfer. Mullin signed four-and-a-half-year deal with Kazan club. He made his debut for Rubin on 21 February 2014 in a Europa League game against Real Betis. He made his Russian Premier League debut for Rubin on 9 March 2014 against Anzhi Makhachkala.

=== Krasnodar ===
On 4 July 2023, Mullin signed with Krasnodar and was assigned to the reserve team Krasnodar-2. He left Krasnodar-2 at the end of the 2023–24 season.

=== Career statistics ===
As of 8 June 2024

Club	Season	League			Cup		Continental		Other		Total	
Club	Season	Division	Apps	Goals	Apps	Goals	Apps	Goals	Apps	Goals	Apps	Goals
Lokomotiv Moscow	2012–13	Russian Premier League	0	0	1	0	–		–		1	0
Rubin Kazan	2013–14	Russian Premier League	6	1	–		2 (Note: Appearances in the UEFA Europa League)	0	–		8	1
Rubin Kazan	2014–15	Russian Premier League	0	0	0	0	–		–		0	0
Rubin Kazan	2015–16	Russian Premier League	0	0	–		0	0	–		0	0
Rubin Kazan	2016–17	Russian Premier League	0	0	–		–		–		0	0
Rubin Kazan	2017–18	Russian Premier League	0	0	0	0	–		–		0	0
Rubin Kazan	Total		6	1	0	0	2	0	0	0	8	1
Sokol Saratov (loan)	2014–15	Russian First League	13	4	–		–		5 (Note: Appearances in the FNL Cup)	2	18	6
Sokol Saratov (loan)	2015–16	Russian First League	18	1	2	0	–		–		20	1
Sokol Saratov (loan)	Total		31	5	2	0	0	0	5	2	38	7
Neftekhimik Nizhnekamsk (loan)	2016–17	Russian First League	21	2	0	0	–		–		21	2
Tyumen	2017–18	Russian First League	9	1	–		–		1	0	10	1
Rotor Volgograd	2018–19	Russian First League	33	7	1	0	–		5	2	39	9
Rotor Volgograd	2019–20	Russian First League	27	7	1	1	–		4	3	32	11
Rotor Volgograd	2020–21	Russian Premier League	25	3	0	0	–		–		25	3
Rotor Volgograd	2021–22	Russian First League	26	5	3	0	–		–		29	5
Rotor Volgograd	Total		111	22	5	1	0	0	9	5	125	28
Rubin Kazan	2022–23	Russian First League	11	0	0	0	–		–		11	0
Volgar Astrakhan (loan)	2022–23	Russian First League	13	1	–		–		–		13	1
Krasnodar-2	2023–24	Russian Second League A	36	6	–		–		–		36	6
Career total			238	38	8	1	2	0	15	7	263	46
