= Dinar Sharipov =

Russian footballer and coach

Personal information
- Full name: Dinar Anvarovich Sharipov
- Date of birth: 15 September 1966 (age 60)
- Height: 1.68 m (5 ft 6 in)
- Positions: Midfielder; forward

Team information
- Current team: FC Krylia Sovetov Samara (U-21 administrator)

Youth career
- FC Gastello Ufa

Senior career*
Years	Team	Apps	(Gls)
1987–1990	FC Krylia Sovetov Samara	104	(7)
1990	FC Rotor Volgograd	0	(0)
1991–1994	FC Krylia Sovetov Samara	107	(7)
1995	FC Lada Togliatti	36	(5)
1996–1997	FC Neftekhimik Nizhnekamsk	54	(5)
1998–2001	FC Nosta Novotroitsk	108	(10)
2002–2003	FC Neftyanik Ufa	43	(4)
2004	FC Lada-SOK Dimitrovgrad	11	(0)

Managerial career
- 2006–2008: FC Yunit Samara (administrator)
- 2015–2018: FC Krylia Sovetov Samara (academy)
- 2018–: FC Krylia Sovetov Samara (U-21 administrator)
- * Club domestic league appearances and goals

Dinar Anvarovich Sharipov (Russian: Динар Анварович Шарипов; born 15 September 1966) is a Russian professional football coach and a former player. He works as an administrator with the Under-21 squad of FC Krylia Sovetov Samara.

== Playing career ==
He made his professional debut in the Soviet First League in 1987 for FC Krylia Sovetov Kuybyshev.

He made his Russian Premier League debut for Krylia Sovetov on 29 March 1992 in a game against FC Spartak Moscow and spent three seasons in the top level with the club.

== Personal life ==
His son Albert Sharipov is a professional footballer.
