= Mikhail Zemskov =

Russian footballer

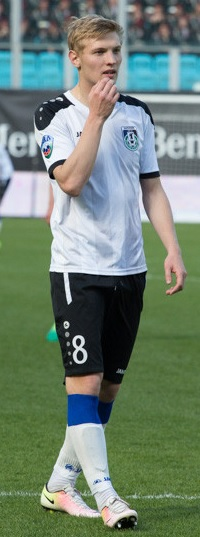
- Zemskov with Shinnik in 2017

Personal information
- Full name: Mikhail Mikhailovich Zemskov
- Date of birth: 2 May 1994 (age 32)
- Place of birth: Yaroslavl, Russia
- Height: 1.76 m (5 ft 9 in)
- Positions: Midfielder; forward

Senior career*
Years	Team	Apps	(Gls)
2011–2015	Torpedo Vladimir	69	(16)
2015–2018	Shinnik Yaroslavl	93	(17)
2018–2020	Avangard Kursk	55	(7)
2020	Neftekhimik Nizhnekamsk	5	(0)
2020	Fakel Voronezh	14	(1)
2021–2022	Sokol Saratov	32	(6)
2022–2023	Avangard Kursk	28	(12)
2023–2024	Spartak Kostroma	23	(1)
2024–2025	Torpedo Vladimir	28	(6)

International career
2014	Russia U-21	6	(2)
- * Club domestic league appearances and goals as of 2 November 2025

Mikhail Mikhailovich Zemskov (Russian: Михаил Михайлович Земсков; born 2 May 1994) is a Russian professional football player.

== Club career ==
He made his Russian Football National League debut for Torpedo Vladimir on 17 October 2011 in a game against Chernomorets Novorossiysk.

== Honors ==
- FNL Cup: 2019

Individual

- FNL Cup Best Midfielder:2019
