= FNL Cup 2012 =

2012 FNL Cup (Кубок ФНЛ)
Tournament details
- Country: Russia
- Dates: 10 February 2012 – 20 February 2012
- Teams: 8

Final positions
- Champions: FC Ural Yekaterinburg
- Runners-up: FC Shinnik Yaroslavl

Tournament statistics
- Matches played: 16
- Goals scored: 43 (2.69 per match)
- Top goal scorer(s): Aleksei Medvedev (4 goals)
- All statistics correct as of 20 February 2012.

National Football League Cup 2012 — Russian football tournament, held among the clubs of Russian Football National League. The first FNL Cup draw took place from 10 February to 20 February 2012 in Cyprus. The final match was held February 20, 2012. Winner of the cup was FC Ural Yekaterinburg.

== Participants ==
Participants of the Cup became the top eight teams in the first stage of 2011–12 Russian National Football League:

- Alania Vladikavkaz
- FC Mordovia Saransk
- FC Shinnik Yaroslavl
- FC Nizhny Novgorod
- FC Sibir Novosibirsk
- FC Dynamo Bryansk
- FC Torpedo Moscow
- FC Ural Yekaterinburg

== Matches ==
=== Group stage ===
==== Group A ====
Pos	Team	Pld	W	D	L	GF	GA	GD	Pts	Qualification
1	FC Shinnik Yaroslavl	3	2	1	0	7	0	+7	7	Qualification to Final
2	FC Sibir Novosibirsk	3	2	0	1	7	3	+4	6	
3	FC Torpedo Moscow	3	1	1	1	3	3	0	4	
4	Alania Vladikavkaz	3	0	0	3	2	13	−11	0	

Updated to match(es) played on 16 February 2012. Source:

10 February 2012	Alania Vladikavkaz	0–6	FC Sibir Novosibirsk	(Cyprus) Larnaca
		Report	Astafyev 20', 65'; Akimov 40', 53' (pen.); Medvedev 61', 66'	Stadium: Alpha Sport Field; Attendance: 20; Referee: Yuri Aponasenko

10 February 2012	FC Shinnik Yaroslavl	0–0	FC Torpedo Moscow	(Cyprus) Larnaca
		Report		Stadium: Alpha Sport Field; Referee: Aleksandr Shishkov

13 February 2012	FC Sibir Novosibirsk	1–0	FC Torpedo Moscow	(Cyprus) Larnaca
	Medvedev 62'	Report		Stadium: Alpha Sport Field; Referee: Artur Karimov

13 February 2012	Alania Vladikavkaz	0–4	FC Shinnik Yaroslavl	(Cyprus) Larnaca
		Report	Arkhipov 18'; Sarkisov 54'; Fyodor Tolstokulakov 65' (o.g.); Nizamutdinov 71'	Stadium: Alpha Sport Field; Referee: Maksim Vasilchenko

16 February 2012	FC Shinnik Yaroslavl	3–0	FC Sibir Novosibirsk	(Cyprus) Larnaca
	Dudchenko 44'; Nezhelev 64'; Arkhipov 87'	Report		Stadium: Alpha Sport Field; Referee: Maksim Vasilchenko

16 February 2012	FC Torpedo Moscow	3–2	Alania Vladikavkaz	(Cyprus) Larnaca
	Malygin 8'; Bezlikhotnov 11'; Bondarenko 22'	Report	Burayev 63', 66' (pen.)	Stadium: Alpha Sport Field; Referee: Sergei Kulikov

==== Group B ====
Pos	Team	Pld	W	D	L	GF	GA	GD	Pts	Qualification
1	FC Ural Yekaterinburg	3	1	2	0	4	1	+3	5	Qualification to Final
2	FC Nizhny Novgorod	3	1	2	0	5	3	+2	5	
3	FC Dynamo Bryansk	3	1	1	1	5	5	0	4	
4	FC Mordovia Saransk	3	0	1	2	0	5	−5	1	

Updated to match(es) played on 16 January 2012. Source:

11 February 2012	FC Mordovia Saransk	0–2	FC Nizhny Novgorod	(Cyprus) Larnaca
		Report	Salugin 6', 40'	Stadium: Alpha Sport Field; Attendance: 20; Referee: Vladimir Moskalyov

11 February 2012	FC Ural Yekaterinburg	3–0	FC Dynamo Bryansk	(Cyprus) Larnaca
	Tumasyan 23'; Petrović 26'; Stavpets 50'	Report		Stadium: Alpha Sport Field; Attendance: 20; Referee: Sergei Kulikov

14 February 2012	FC Nizhny Novgorod	2–2	FC Dynamo Bryansk	(Cyprus) Larnaca
	Kudryashov 14' (pen.), 53'	Report	Golubov 49'; Karytska 51' (pen.)	Stadium: Alpha Sport Field; Referee: Yuri Aponasenko

14 February 2012	FC Mordovia Saransk	0–0	FC Ural Yekaterinburg	(Cyprus) Larnaca
		Report		Stadium: Alpha Sport Field; Referee: Vladimir Moskalyov

17 February 2012	FC Ural Yekaterinburg	1–1	FC Nizhny Novgorod	(Cyprus) Larnaca
	Tumasyan 22'	Report	Salugin 36'	Stadium: Alpha Sport Field; Referee: Yuri Aponasenko

17 February 2012	FC Dynamo Bryansk	3–0	FC Mordovia Saransk	(Cyprus) Larnaca
	Beketov 20'; Golubov 40'; Barmin 67' (o.g..)	Report		Stadium: Alpha Sport Field; Referee: Artur Karimov

=== Final matches ===
19 February 2012 Match for 7th place	Alania Vladikavkaz	1–0	FC Mordovia Saransk	(Cyprus) Larnaca
	Gogichayev 25'	Report		Stadium: Alpha Sport Field; Referee: Maksim Vasilchenko

19 February 2012 Match for 5th place	FC Torpedo Moscow	3–1	FC Dynamo Bryansk	(Cyprus) Larnaca
	Satalkin 25'; Dorozhkin 36'; Bolshakov 53'	Report	William 58'	Stadium: Alpha Sport Field; Referee: Vladimir Moskalyov

19 February 2012 Match for 3rd place	FC Sibir Novosibirsk	2–2 (4–1 p)	FC Nizhny Novgorod	(Cyprus) Larnaca
	Medvedev 31' (pen.); Bukhryakov 47'	Report	Kazantsev 29'; Kudryashov 43'	Stadium: Alpha Sport Field; Referee: Sergei Kulikov
	Penalties
	Akimov (penalty scored); Čížek (penalty scored); Brkljača (penalty scored); Sabitov (penalty scored)		Gagloyev (penalty missed); Vaganov (penalty missed); Kudryashov (penalty scored)

== Final ==
20 February 2012 Final	FC Shinnik Yaroslavl	0–1	FC Ural Yekaterinburg	(Cyprus) Larnaca
		Report	Safronidi 11'	Stadium: Alpha Sport Field; Referee: Artur Karimov

Winner FNL Cup
2012
FC Ural Yekaterinburg
1st title
