= Roman Yanushkovsky =

Russian footballer

Personal information
- Full name: Roman Aleksandrovich Yanushkovsky
- Date of birth: 4 January 1995 (age 31)
- Place of birth: Moscow, Russia
- Height: 1.80 m (5 ft 11 in)
- Position: Winger

Team information
- Current team: Irtysh Omsk
- Number: 10

Senior career*
Years	Team	Apps	(Gls)
2014–2016	Sportakademklub Moscow		
2017–2018	KAMAZ	31	(6)
2018–2019	Rotor Volgograd	20	(1)
2018–2019	→ Rotor-2 Volgograd	4	(2)
2020–2022	KAMAZ	56	(13)
2022–2023	Neftekhimik Nizhnekamsk	13	(0)
2023–2024	Metallurg Lipetsk	10	(1)
2024	Torpedo Vladimir	6	(2)
2024–	Irtysh Omsk	56	(11)
- * Club domestic league appearances and goals as of 17 October 2026

Roman Aleksandrovich Yanushkovsky (Russian: Роман Александрович Янушковский; born on 4 January 1995) is a Russian football player who plays for Irtysh Omsk.

== Club career ==
He made his debut in the Russian Professional Football League for KAMAZ Naberezhnye Chelny on 18 April 2017, in a game against Zenit-Izhevsk.

He made his Russian Football National League debut for Rotor Volgograd on 22 July 2018, in a game against Luch Vladivostok.

He was the best player and top scorer (with 4 goals) of the 2019 FNL Cup.
