= Aleksandr Balakhonov =

Russian footballer

Personal information
- Full name: Aleksandr Alekseyevich Balakhonov
- Date of birth: 26 June 2002 (age 24)
- Place of birth: Volgograd, Russia
- Height: 1.93 m (6 ft 4 in)
- Position: Centre-back

Team information
- Current team: FC Torpedo Miass
- Number: 2

Youth career
- –2017: FC Rotor Volgograd
- 2017–2018: FC Volgograd
- 2019: SShOR №11 Zenit-Volgograd

Senior career*
Years	Team	Apps	(Gls)
2019–2022	FC Rotor Volgograd	0	(0)
2021–2022	→ FC Rotor-2 Volgograd	23	(0)
2022–2023	FC Forte Taganrog	17	(0)
2023	FC Torpedo Moscow	0	(0)
2023	→ FC Torpedo-2	10	(1)
2024–2026	FC Nosta Novotroitsk	29	(0)
2026–	FC Torpedo Miass	19	(0)
- * Club domestic league appearances and goals as of 17 October 2026

Aleksandr Alekseyevich Balakhonov (Russian: Александр Алексеевич Балахонов; born 26 June 2002) is a Russian football player who plays for FC Torpedo Miass.

== Club career ==
He made his debut for the main squad of FC Rotor Volgograd on 21 October 2020 in a Russian Cup game against PFC Krylia Sovetov Samara.

He made his debut in the Russian Football National League 2 for FC Rotor-2 Volgograd on 1 August 2022 in a game against FC Druzhba Maykop.
