= Nikolay Kuznetsov (footballer) =

Russian footballer

Personal information
- Full name: Nikolay Dmitriyevich Kuznetsov
- Date of birth: 19 February 1999 (age 27)
- Place of birth: Volgograd, Russia
- Height: 1.81 m (5 ft 11 in)
- Position: Midfielder

Youth career
- 2013–2018: FC Rotor Volgograd

Senior career*
Years	Team	Apps	(Gls)
2017–2022	FC Rotor-2 Volgograd	76	(8)
2020–2022	FC Rotor Volgograd	3	(0)
2020–2021	→ FC Sokol Saratov (loan)	30	(2)
2022–2023	FC Sokol Saratov	10	(0)
- * Club domestic league appearances and goals

Nikolay Dmitriyevich Kuznetsov (Russian: Николай Дмитриевич Кузнецов; born 19 February 1999) is a Russian former football player.

== Club career ==
He made his debut in the Russian Football National League for FC Rotor Volgograd on 15 March 2020 in a game against FC Shinnik Yaroslavl.
