= Marko Lipp =

Estonian footballer (born 1999)

Personal information
- Full name: Marko Lipp
- Date of birth: 19 March 1999 (age 27)
- Place of birth: Tallinn, Estonia
- Height: 1.88 m (6 ft 2 in)
- Position: Centre-back

Team information
- Current team: Pärnu Vaprus
- Number: 28

Youth career
- 2007–2008: Kotkas Juunior
- 2009–2015: FCI Levadia

Senior career*
Years	Team	Apps	(Gls)
2016–2021	FCI Levadia U21	78	(3)
2017–2022	FCI Levadia	33	(3)
2021	→ Tammeka (loan)	11	(1)
2022–2024	Flora U21	12	(0)
2022–2024	Flora	22	(1)
2024	Kuressaare	8	(0)
2025–	Pärnu Vaprus	61	(1)

International career^{‡}
2014	Estonia U16	2	(0)
2014–2015	Estonia U17	9	(0)
2015	Estonia U18	1	(0)
2016–2017	Estonia U19	22	(1)
2019–2020	Estonia U21	10	(2)
2019	Estonia U23	1	(0)
2023–	Estonia	2	(0)
- * Club domestic league appearances and goals as of 17 November 2026 ‡ National team caps and goals as of 15 January 2023

Marko Lipp (born 19 March 1999) is an Estonian professional footballer who currently plays as a centre-back for Meistriliiga club Pärnu Vaprus and the Estonia national team.

== International career ==
Lipp made his senior international debut for Estonia on 8 January 2023, in a 1–1 draw against Iceland in a friendly.

== Honours ==
=== Club ===
FCI Levadia

- Estonian Cup: 2017–18, 2020–21
- Estonian Supercup: 2018

Flora

- Meistriliiga: 2022
