= Geroskipou Municipality Stadium =

Stadium in Geroskipou, Cyprus

Coordinates: 34.7438°N 32.4407°E

Geroskipou Stadium
- Interactive map of Geroskipou Stadium
- Full name: Geroskipou Municipal Stadium "Michalis Christofi Kyprianou"
- Location: Geroskipou, Cyprus
- Owner: Geroskipou Municipality
- Capacity: 2,000
- Surface: Grass

Tenants
- Atromitos (2007–2013); Koloni Geroskipou FC (2013-); Afroditi Geroskipou FC (2015-)

Geroskipou Stadium (Greek: Δημοτικό Στάδιο Γεροσκήπου) is a small stadium in Geroskipou, which serves as the reserve home ground of Pafos FC.
