= Sergey Rusak =

Belarusian footballer

Syarhey Rusak
Personal information
- Full name: Syarhey Ryhoravich Rusak
- Date of birth: 3 September 1993 (age 33)
- Place of birth: Minsk, Belarus
- Height: 1.90 m (6 ft 3 in)
- Position: Midfielder

Team information
- Current team: Dnepr Mogilev
- Number: 8

Youth career
- 2010–2011: Minsk

Senior career*
Years	Team	Apps	(Gls)
2012–2017	Minsk	48	(2)
2012–2014	→ Minsk-2	74	(7)
2018	Torpedo Minsk	22	(2)
2019	Fakel Voronezh	8	(0)
2019	Palanga	6	(0)
2020	Smolevichi	4	(0)
2020	Slutsk	5	(0)
2021	Belshina Bobruisk	20	(5)
2022–2024	Slutsk	52	(2)
2024–2025	Maxline Vitebsk	18	(1)
2026–	Dnepr Mogilev	13	(0)
- * Club domestic league appearances and goals as of 3 July 2026

Sergey Grigoryevich Rusak (Belarusian: Сяргей Рыгоравіч Русак; Russian: Сергей Григорьевич Русак; born 3 September 1993) is a Belarusian footballer who plays for Dnepr Mogilev.
