= Albert Sharipov =

Russian footballer (born 1993)

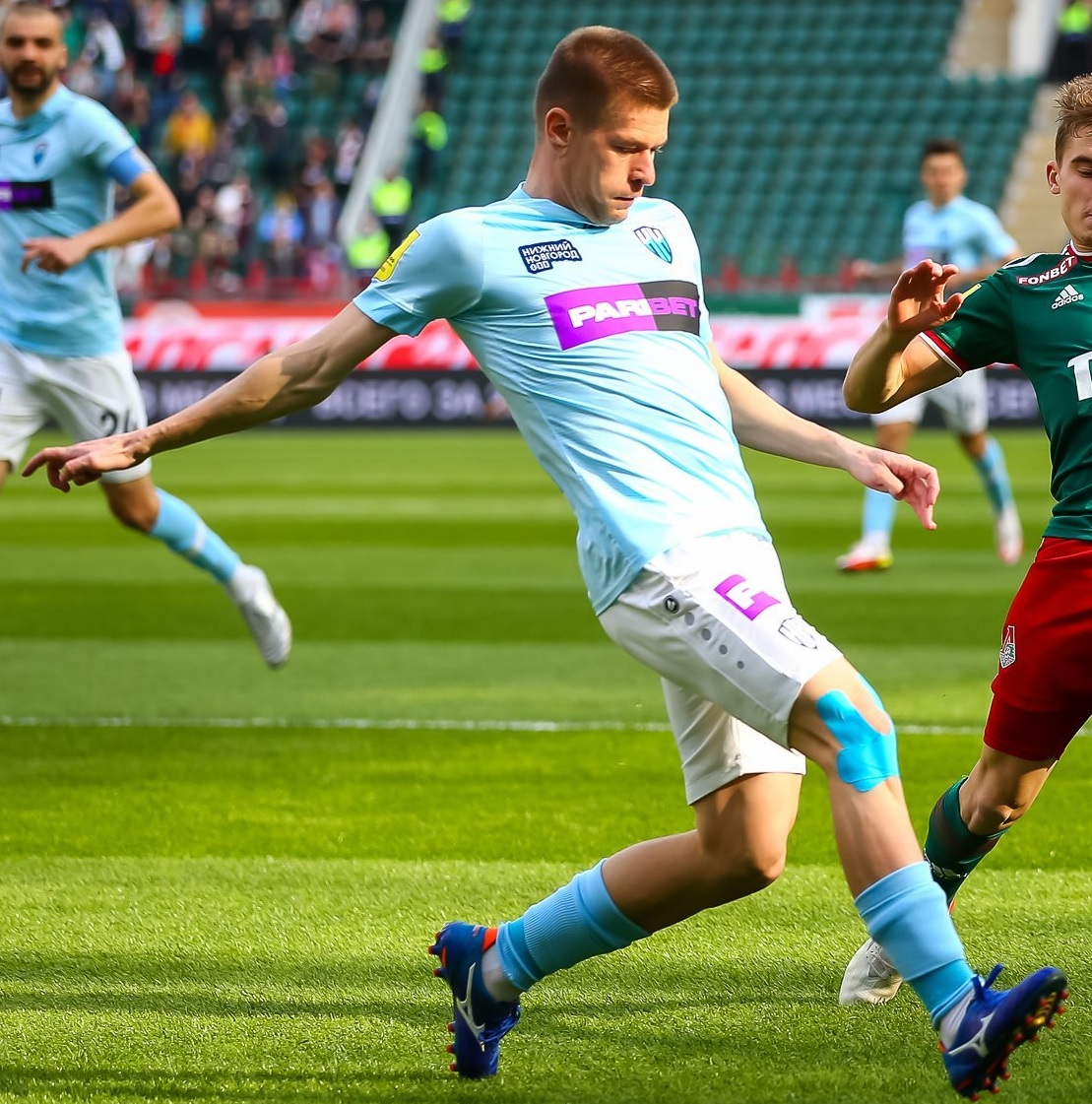
- Sharipov with Nizhny Novgorod in 2022

Personal information
- Full name: Albert Dinarovich Sharipov
- Date of birth: 11 April 1993 (age 33)
- Place of birth: Ufa, Russia
- Height: 1.71 m (5 ft 7 in)
- Position: Midfielder

Youth career
- Konoplyov football academy

Senior career*
Years	Team	Apps	(Gls)
2010–2012	FC Akademiya Togliatti	48	(7)
2013–2014	FC Kuban Krasnodar	0	(0)
2013	→ FC Tyumen (loan)	10	(4)
2013–2014	→ FC Fakel Voronezh (loan)	21	(2)
2014–2015	FC Tom Tomsk	21	(1)
2015–2018	FC Rubin Kazan	1	(0)
2016	→ FC Tom Tomsk (loan)	6	(1)
2016–2017	→ FC Neftekhimik Nizhnekamsk (loan)	1	(0)
2018–2020	FC Rotor Volgograd	26	(0)
2020–2023	FC Pari Nizhny Novgorod	66	(2)
2023–2025	FC Kuban Krasnodar	43	(2)

International career^{‡}
2014	Russia U-21	7	(1)
- * Club domestic league appearances and goals as of 14 June 2025 ‡ National team caps and goals as of 31 May 2014

Albert Dinarovich Sharipov (Tatar: Әлбирт Динар улы Шәрипов, Russian: Альберт Динарович Шарипов; born 11 April 1993) is a Russian professional football player who plays as a central midfielder.

== Club career ==
He made his Russian Premier League debut for FC Rubin Kazan on 18 July 2015 in a game against PFC CSKA Moscow.

== Personal life ==
His father Dinar Sharipov played in the Russian Premier League for FC Krylia Sovetov Samara.

== Career statistics ==
As of 27 November 2022

Club	Season	League			Cup		Continental		Other		Total	
Club	Season	Division	Apps	Goals	Apps	Goals	Apps	Goals	Apps	Goals	Apps	Goals
Akademiya Tolyatti	2010	PFL	4	0	0	0	–		–		4	0
Akademiya Tolyatti	2011–12	PFL	30	6	0	0	–		–		30	6
Akademiya Tolyatti	2012–13	PFL	14	1	1	0	–		–		15	1
Akademiya Tolyatti	Total		48	7	1	0	0	0	0	0	49	7
Tyumen	2012–13	PFL	10	4	–		–		–		10	4
Fakel Voronezh	2013–14	PFL	21	2	0	0	–		–		21	2
Tom Tomsk	2014–15	FNL	21	1	0	0	–		4 (Note: Two appearances in the promotion play-offs, two appearances in the FNL Cup)	0	25	1
Rubin Kazan	2015–16	RPL	1	0	0	0	0	0	–		1	0
Rubin Kazan	2017–18	RPL	0	0	0	0	–		–		0	0
Rubin Kazan	Total		1	0	0	0	0	0	0	0	1	0
Tom Tomsk (loan)	2015–16	FNL	6	1	0	0	–		3 (Note: Two appearances in the promotion play-offs, one appearance in the FNL Cup)	0	9	1
Tom Tomsk (loan)	Total		27	2	0	0	0	0	7	0	34	2
Neftekhimik Nizhnekamsk (loan)	2016–17	FNL	1	0	0	0	–		–		1	0
Rotor Volgograd	2018–19	FNL	21	0	0	0	–		4 (Note: Appearances in the FNL Cup)	0	25	0
Rotor Volgograd	2019–20	FNL	5	0	1	0	–		–		6	0
Rotor Volgograd	Total		26	0	1	0	0	0	4	0	31	0
Pari NN	2020–21	FNL	27	2	1	0	–		–		28	2
Pari NN	2021–22	RPL	22	0	2	0	–		–		24	0
Pari NN	2022–23	RPL	10	0	2	0	–		–		12	0
Pari NN	Total		59	2	5	0	0	0	0	0	64	2
Career total			193	17	7	0	0	0	11	0	211	17
