= Nikolai Pokidyshev =

Russian footballer

Personal information
- Full name: Nikolai Denisovich Pokidyshev
- Date of birth: 17 June 1997 (age 29)
- Place of birth: Pavlovsky Posad, Russia
- Height: 1.83 m (6 ft 0 in)
- Position: Centre-back

Team information
- Current team: FC Rotor Volgograd
- Number: 17

Youth career
- –2008: DYuSSh Pavlovsky Posad
- 2008–2009: UOR Master-Saturn Yegoryevsk
- 2009: DYuSSh Pavlovsky Posad
- 2009–2014: UOR-5 Yegoryevsk

Senior career*
Years	Team	Apps	(Gls)
2015–2018	FC Saturn Ramenskoye	50	(1)
2018–2023	FC Shinnik Yaroslavl	136	(1)
2023–2025	FC SKA-Khabarovsk	62	(1)
2025–	FC Rotor Volgograd	27	(1)
- * Club domestic league appearances and goals as of 16 May 2026

Nikolai Denisovich Pokidyshev (Russian: Николай Денисович Покидышев; born 17 June 1997) is a Russian football player who plays for FC Rotor Volgograd.

== Club career ==
He made his debut in the Russian Professional Football League for FC Saturn Ramenskoye on 18 May 2015 in a game against FC Strogino Moscow.

Pokidyshev signed with FC Shinnik Yaroslavl in 2018.

He made his Russian Football National League debut for FC Shinnik Yaroslavl on 17 July 2018 in a game against FC Avangard Kursk.
