= Dmitri Vershkov =

Russian footballer

Personal information
- Full name: Dmitri Aleksandrovich Vershkov
- Date of birth: 27 May 2002 (age 24)
- Height: 1.84 m (6 ft 0 in)
- Position: Defender

Youth career
- –2020: FC Energiya Volzhsky
- 2020–: FC Rotor Volgograd

Senior career*
Years	Team	Apps	(Gls)
2021–2022	FC Rotor Volgograd	1	(0)
2021–2022	FC Rotor-2 Volgograd	26	(0)
2022–2023	FC Rotor Volgograd	0	(0)
- * Club domestic league appearances and goals as of 4 June 2023

Dmitri Aleksandrovich Vershkov (Russian: Дмитрий Александрович Вершков; born 27 May 2002) is a Russian football player.

== Club career ==
He made his debut in the Russian Premier League for FC Rotor Volgograd on 24 April 2021 in a game against FC Zenit Saint Petersburg.
