= Anton Piskunov =

Russian footballer (born 1989)

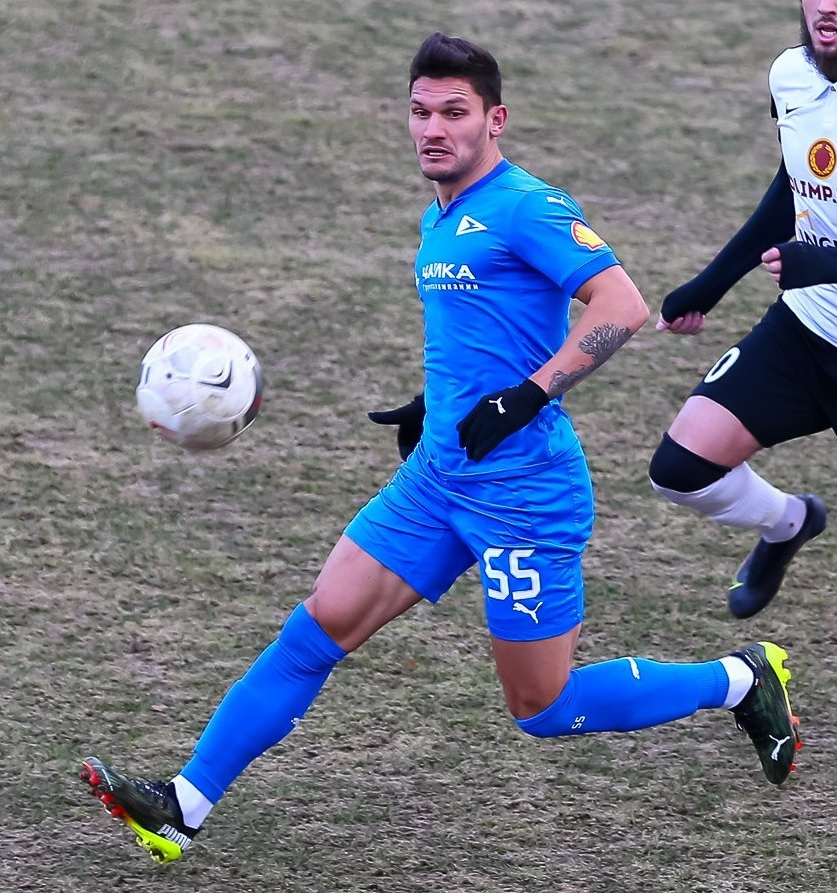
- Piskunov with Chayka in 2021

Personal information
- Full name: Anton Vyacheslavovich Piskunov
- Date of birth: 13 February 1989 (age 37)
- Place of birth: Suzemka, Russian SFSR
- Height: 1.81 m (5 ft 11 in)
- Position: Defender

Senior career*
Years	Team	Apps	(Gls)
2008–2009	FC Nara-ShBFR Naro-Fominsk	43	(0)
2010	FC Zelenograd	31	(1)
2011	FC Druzhba Maykop	25	(2)
2012–2014	FC Rubin Kazan	0	(0)
2012	→ FC KAMAZ Naberezhnye Chelny (loan)	7	(0)
2012–2014	→ FC Neftekhimik Nizhnekamsk (loan)	55	(0)
2014	FC Dynamo Saint Petersburg	13	(0)
2015–2016	FC Luch-Energiya Vladivostok	67	(4)
2017–2020	FC Rotor Volgograd	70	(3)
2020–2022	FC Chayka Peschanokopskoye	47	(0)
- * Club domestic league appearances and goals

Anton Vyacheslavovich Piskunov (Russian: Антон Вячеславович Пискунов; born 13 February 1989) is a Russian former professional football player.

== Club career ==
He made his Russian Football National League debut for FC KAMAZ Naberezhnye Chelny on 1 April 2012 in a game against FC Chernomorets Novorossiysk.

In January 2015, he signed with FC Luch-Energiya Vladivostok.

He made his Russian Premier League debut for FC Rotor Volgograd on 11 August 2020 in a game against FC Zenit Saint Petersburg.
