= Vladislav Bragin =

Russian footballer

Personal information
- Full name: Vladislav Igorevich Bragin
- Date of birth: 25 January 1998 (age 28)
- Place of birth: Irkutsk, Russia
- Height: 1.86 m (6 ft 1 in)
- Position: Forward

Team information
- Current team: SKA-Khabarovsk
- Number: 11

Youth career
- –2016: FC Krasnodar

Senior career*
Years	Team	Apps	(Gls)
2017–2018	Zemplín Michalovce	22	(1)
2017	→ Slavoj Trebišov (loan)	8	(2)
2019	Ural-2 Yekaterinburg	0	(0)
2019	Eskilstuna	1	(0)
2019–2022	SKA Khabarovsk	71	(9)
2022–2023	Volgar Astrakhan	9	(0)
2023	Dynamo Vladivostok	13	(2)
2024–2025	Irkutsk	21	(10)
2025	Dynamo Kirov	22	(5)
2025–	SKA-Khabarovsk	20	(2)

International career
2015	Russia U-17	7	(1)
- * Club domestic league appearances and goals as of 16 May 2026

Vladislav Bragin (Russian: Владислав Игоревич Брагин; born 25 January 1998) is a Russian footballer who plays as a forward for SKA-Khabarovsk.

== Club career ==
=== MFK Zemplín Michalovce ===
In March 2017, he signed contract with Michalovce. Bragin made his professional Fortuna Liga's debut for Zemplín Michalovce on 1 March 2017 against Ružomberok.

=== AFC Eskilstuna ===
On 2 April 2019, Bragin joined Swedish club Eskilstuna. After playing only one game for the club it was confirmed on 2 June 2019, that Bragin would leave the club at the end of the month where his contract expired.

=== SKA-Khabarovsk ===
He made his Russian Football National League debut for SKA Khabarovsk on 7 July 2019 in a game against Shinnik Yaroslavl. He scored his first FNL goal in the next game on 13 July 2019 in a 2–2 draw with Spartak Moscow 2, but he was also sent off in that game.
