= Oleg Nikolayev (footballer) =

Russian footballer

Personal information
- Full name: Oleg Vladimirovich Nikolayev
- Date of birth: 21 May 1998 (age 28)
- Place of birth: Luhansk, Ukraine
- Height: 1.80 m (5 ft 11 in)
- Position: Left winger

Team information
- Current team: Sibir Novosibirsk
- Number: 11

Youth career
- 2006–2015: Olimpia Volgograd

Senior career*
| Years | Team | Apps | (Gls) |
| 2016–2022 | Rotor Volgograd | 118 | (10) |
| 2018–2019 | → Rotor-2 Volgograd | 2 | (0) |
| 2021 | → Volgar Astrakhan (loan) | 15 | (1) |
| 2021 | → Rotor-2 Volgograd | 1 | (1) |
| 2022 | → Tyumen (loan) | 8 | (1) |
| 2022–2023 | Tyumen | 21 | (0) |
| 2023–2025 | Chayka Peschanokopskoye | 59 | (3) |
| 2025–2026 | Chernomorets Novorossiysk | 33 | (5) |
| 2026– | Sibir Novosibirsk | 14 | (2) |
- * Club domestic league appearances and goals as of 15 November 2026

Oleg Vladimirovich Nikolayev (Russian: Олег Владимирович Николаев; born 21 May 1998) is a Russian football player who plays for Sibir Novosibirsk.

== Club career ==
He made his debut in the Russian Professional Football League for Rotor Volgograd on 28 July 2016 in a game against Mashuk-KMV Pyatigorsk.

He made his Russian Football National League debut for Rotor on 8 July 2017 in a game against Khimki.

He made his Russian Premier League debut for Rotor Volgograd on 11 August 2020 in a game against Zenit Saint Petersburg.

On 19 January 2021, he joined Volgar Astrakhan on loan until the end of the 2020–21 season.
