= Kirill Dontsov =

Russian footballer

Personal information
- Full name: Kirill Fyodorovich Dontsov
- Date of birth: 21 December 2001 (age 24)
- Place of birth: Volgograd, Russia
- Height: 1.91 m (6 ft 3 in)
- Position: Centre-back

Team information
- Current team: Krasnoye Znamya Noginsk

Youth career
- Rotor Volgograd

Senior career*
Years	Team	Apps	(Gls)
2018–2020	Rotor-2 Volgograd	22	(0)
2019–2021	Rotor Volgograd	1	(0)
2021	Smolensk	0	(0)
2021	Dynamo Makhachkala	0	(0)
2022–2023	Avangard Kursk	36	(5)
2023–2024	Rotor Volgograd	4	(0)
2024	→ Zenit-2 St. Petersburg (loan)	4	(0)
2025–2026	Metallurg Lipetsk	21	(0)
2026–	Krasnoye Znamya Noginsk (amateur)		
- * Club domestic league appearances and goals as of 1 November 2025

Kirill Fyodorovich Dontsov (Russian: Кирилл Фёдорович Донцов; born 21 December 2001) is a Russian football player who plays for Krasnoye Znamya Noginsk.

== Club career ==
He made his debut in the Russian Premier League for Rotor Volgograd on 27 September 2020 in a game against Rubin Kazan.
