= 2024–25 FC KAMAZ Naberezhnye Chelny season =

FC KAMAZ Naberezhnye Chelny
2024–25 season
- Stadium: KAMAZ Stadium
- Russian First League: 13th
- Russian Cup: Pre-season

The 2024–25 season is the 44th season in the history of FC KAMAZ Naberezhnye Chelny, and the club's fourth consecutive season in the Russian First League. In addition to the domestic league, the team is scheduled to participate in the Russian Cup.

== Friendlies ==
=== Pre-season ===
29 June 2024 Friendly	KAMAZ Naberezhnye Chelny (Russia)	2–1	(Russia) Krylia Sovetov Samara
17:00	40'; 70'		33'

== Competitions ==
=== Overall record ===
Competition	First match	Last match	Starting round	Record							
Competition	First match	Last match	Starting round	Pld	W	D	L	GF	GA	GD	Win %
Russian First League	14 July 2024		Matchday 1	3	0	0	3	1	4	−3	0.00
Russian Cup				0	0	0	0	0	0	+0	—
Total				3	0	0	3	1	4	−3	0.00

Last updated: 27 July 2024
Source: Soccerway

=== Russian First League ===
==== League table ====
Pos	Team	Pld	W	D	L	GF	GA	GD	Pts
9	Rotor Volgograd	34	11	14	9	32	26	+6	47
10	Arsenal Tula	34	8	17	9	25	30	−5	41
11	KAMAZ Naberezhnye Chelny	34	10	8	16	31	35	−4	38 (Note: Ranked on head-to-head points (KAMAZ 6, Neftekhimik 5, Chayka 4))
12	Neftekhimik Nizhnekamsk	34	9	11	14	31	37	−6	38
13	Chayka Peschanokopskoye	34	8	14	12	31	43	−12	38

Source: Soccerway
Rules for classification: 1) Points; 2) Head-to-head points; 3) Head-to-head matches won; 4) Head-to-head goal difference; 5) Head-to-head goals scored; 6) Head-to-head away goals scored; 7) Matches won; 8) Goal difference; 9) Goals scored; 10) Away matches won; 11) Away goals scored; 12) Best disciplinary record (3 points for red card, 1 point for yellow card); 13) Drawing lots. If teams tied on points did not play an equal number of head-to-head games, head-to-head criteria and disciplinary record are not used for positioning. If 1st- and 2nd-placed teams are tied in the final standings on the first 12 criteria, a winner is determined in an additional play-off game, with no extra time and a penalty-shootout if tied at the end of regulation, instead of drawing lots.

==== Results summary ====
Overall								Home						Away					
Pld	W	D	L	GF	GA	GD	Pts	W	D	L	GF	GA	GD	W	D	L	GF	GA	GD
3	0	0	3	1	4	−3	0	0	0	0	0	0	0	0	0	3	1	4	−3

Last updated: 27 July 2024.

==== Results by round ====
Round	1	2	3	4
Ground	A	A	A	A
Result	L	L	L	
Position	13	14		

Updated to match(es) played on 27 July 2024. Source:
A = Away; H = Home; W = Win; D = Draw; L = Loss

==== Matches ====
The tentative match schedule was released on 27 June.

14 July 2024 1	Yenisey Krasnoyarsk	2–1	KAMAZ Naberezhnye Chelny	Krasnoyarsk
13:00 UTC+3	Tses 62'; Lomakin 72'		Gorelov 90+1'	Stadium: Central Stadium; Attendance: 4,428; Referee: Igor Zakharov

20 July 2024 2	Arsenal Tula	1–0	KAMAZ Naberezhnye Chelny	Tula
19:00 UTC+3	Bolshakov 75'			Stadium: Arsenal Stadium; Attendance: 3,917; Referee: Nikolay Voloshin

27 July 2024 3	Sokol Saratov	1–0	KAMAZ Naberezhnye Chelny	Saratov
18:00 UTC+3	Karpitskiy 51'			Stadium: Lokomotiv Stadium; Attendance: 3,180; Referee: Alexey Lapatukhin

4 August 2024 4	Rodina Moscow	v	KAMAZ Naberezhnye Chelny	Moscow
20:00 UTC+3				Stadium: Sapsan Arena
