= 2021–22 Russian First Division =

Russian Football National League
- Season: 2021–22
- Dates: 10 July 2021 – 21 May 2022
- Champions: Torpedo Moscow (1st title)
- Promoted: Torpedo Moscow; Fakel Voronezh; Orenburg (through promotion play-offs)
- Relegated: Tom Tomsk; Olimp-Dolgoprudny; Metallurg Lipetsk; Rotor Volgograd; Tekstilshchik Ivanovo
- Matches: 380
- Goals: 955 (2.51 per match)
- Top goalscorer: Maksim Maksimov (22 goals)
- Biggest home win: Torpedo Moscow 7–1 Metallurg Lipetsk; 29 August 2021
- Biggest away win: Tekstilshchik 0–5 Fakel; 16 April 2022
- Highest scoring: Kuban Krasnodar 5–5 Alania Vladikavkaz; 17 November 2021
- Longest winning run: 6 matches Yenisey; 27 November 2021 - 2 April 2022
- Longest unbeaten run: 12 matches Torpedo Moscow; 10 July 2021 - 19 September 2021
- Longest winless run: 16 matches Tekstilshchik; 6 November 2021 - 7 May 2022
- Longest losing run: 8 matches Rotor Volgograd; 6 November 2021 - 19 March 2022
- All statistics correct as of 21 May 2022.

The 2021–22 Russian Football National League was the 30th season of Russia's second-tier football league since the dissolution of the Soviet Union. The season began on 10 July 2021, and had a 3 month winter break between game weeks 25 and 26 (December to March).

== Stadia by capacity ==
Club	City	Stadium	Capacity
Akron	Tolyatti	Kristall Stadium, Zhigulyovsk	1,565
Alania	Vladikavkaz	Republican Spartak Stadium	32,464
Baltika	Kaliningrad	Arena Baltika	35,212
Fakel	Voronezh	Tsentralnyi Profsoyuz	31,793
KAMAZ	Naberezhnye Chelny	KAMAZ Stadium	6,248
Krasnodar-2	Krasnodar	Krasnodar Academy	3,500
Kuban Krasnodar	Krasnodar	Kuban Stadium	35,200
Metallurg Lipetsk	Lipetsk	Metallurg Stadium	10,000
Neftekhimik	Nizhnekamsk	Neftekhimik Stadium	3,100
Olimp-Dolgoprudny	Dolgoprudny	Salyut Stadium	
Orenburg	Orenburg	Gazovik Stadium	7,520
Rotor Volgograd	Volgograd	Volgograd Arena	45,568
SKA	Khabarovsk	Lenin Stadium	15,200
Spartak-2	Moscow	Spartak Academy	3,077
Tekstilshchik	Ivanovo	Tekstilshchik	9,565
Tom	Tomsk	Trud	10,028
Torpedo Moscow	Moscow	Sports Village, Luzhniki Olympic Complex	1,872
Veles Moscow	Moscow	Avangard Stadium, Domodedovo	5,503
Volgar Astrakhan	Astrakhan	Central Stadium	21,500
Yenisey	Krasnoyarsk	Central Stadium	15,000

1. Alania plays at Akhmat-Arena, Grozny, capacity 30,000, while their own stadium is under reconstruction
2. Torpedo's own Eduard Streltsov Stadium is under reconstruction

== Team changes ==
=== To FNL ===
Promoted from PFL

- Kuban Krasnodar
- Olimp-Dolgoprudny
- Metallurg Lipetsk
- KAMAZ

Relegated from Premier League

- Rotor Volgograd

=== From FNL ===
Relegated to PFL

- Irtysh Omsk
- Dynamo Bryansk
- Chertanovo Moscow
- Shinnik Yaroslavl

Demoted to lower divisions

- Chayka Peschanokopskoye

Promoted to Premier League

- Krylia Sovetov
- Nizhny Novgorod

== Stadia by locations ==
,,
Location of teams in 2021–22 FNL.
,
Location of Moscow teams.

== League table ==
Pos	Team	Pld	W	D	L	GF	GA	GD	Pts	Promotion, qualification or relegation
1	Torpedo Moscow (C, P)	38	20	15	3	65	36	+29	75	Promotion to Russian Premier League
2	Fakel Voronezh (P)	38	23	5	10	60	33	+27	74 (Note: Head-to-head points: Fakel Voronezh 6, Orenburg 0)	Promotion to Russian Premier League
3	Orenburg (Q, P)	38	23	5	10	64	37	+27	74	Qualification to Russian Premier League play-offs
4	SKA-Khabarovsk (Q)	38	19	8	11	48	38	+10	65	Qualification to Russian Premier League play-offs
5	Yenisey Krasnoyarsk	38	19	6	13	58	55	+3	63	
6	Alania Vladikavkaz	38	17	9	12	75	53	+22	60	
7	Spartak-2 Moscow (D)	38	18	4	16	48	55	−7	58	Dissolved after the season (Note: On 23 May 2022, FC Spartak Moscow announced that FC Spartak-2 Moscow will be dissolved and not participate in the 2022–23 season. League president announced that the replacement will be chosen at a later date.)
8	Neftekhimik Nizhnekamsk	38	17	7	14	60	43	+17	58	
9	Akron Tolyatti	38	16	10	12	47	40	+7	58	
10	Baltika Kaliningrad	38	14	16	8	51	30	+21	58	
11	Krasnodar-2	38	15	8	15	45	45	0	53	Ineligible for promotion
12	Kuban Krasnodar	38	13	10	15	45	48	−3	49	
13	Veles Moscow	38	14	6	18	45	48	−3	48	
14	Tom Tomsk (Note: On 3 June 2022, the Russian Football Union rejected Tom's appeal on its previous decision to deny Tom the RFS-2 license that is necessary to play in the FNL. Tom announced they will file an application for the FNL2 license.) (D)	38	13	9	16	51	60	−9	48	Dissolved after the season
15	Olimp-Dolgoprudny (Note: On 3 June 2022, the Russian Football Union confirmed their decision to not grant Olimp-Dolgoprudny the RFS-2 license that is necessary to play in the FNL. Their appeal was not considered as it was not filed according to the procedure.) (D)	38	9	14	15	35	47	−12	41	Dissolved after the season
16	Volgar Astrakhan	38	10	9	19	30	43	−13	39	
17	KAMAZ (Note: On 6 June 2022, KAMAZ confirmed that they will participate in the 2022–23 FNL season to replace the clubs that failed licensing.)	38	8	13	17	29	45	−16	37	
18	Rotor Volgograd (R)	38	8	12	18	37	53	−16	36	Relegation to lower divisions
19	Metallurg Lipetsk (R)	38	9	6	23	31	70	−39	33	Relegation to lower divisions
20	Tekstilshchik Ivanovo (R)	38	5	8	25	31	76	−45	23	Relegation to lower divisions

Source: Soccerway
Rules for classification: 1) Points; then in case of a two-way tie: 2) Head-to-head points; 3) Head-to-head matches won; 4) Head-to-head goal difference; 5) Head-to-head goals scored; 6) Head-to-head away goals scored; 7) Matches won; 8) Goal difference; 9) Goals scored; 10) Away goals scored; 11) Drawing lots; in case of a three-or-more-way tie: 2) Matches won; 3) Head-to-head points; 4) Head-to-head matches won; 5) Head-to-head goal difference; 6) Head-to-head goals scored; 7) Head-to-head away goals scored; 8) Goal difference; 9) Goals scored; 10) Away goals scored; 11) Drawing lots.
(C) Champions; (D) Disqualified; (P) Promoted; (Q) Qualified for the phase indicated; (R) Relegated

== Results ==
Home \ Away	AKR	ALA	BAL	FAK	KAM	KR2	KUB	MLP	NEF	OLD	ORE	ROT	SKA	SP2	TEK	TOM	TOR	VEL	VOL	YEN
Akron		2–1	0–0	2–0	0–0	1–0	1–0	2–0	1–3	2–1	0–3	1–0	1–2	0–1	4–1	3–3	1–0	1–1	1–0	4–1
Alania	2–2		0–3	1–0	3–2	2–1	2–1	5–0	2–3	2–0	1–0	0–1	3–1	2–3	4–0	3–0	5–1	2–1	0–1	1–2
Baltika	2–0	1–1		0–1	0–0	2–1	0–0	0–0	0–0	1–1	1–1	2–1	2–0	0–1	3–0	4–0	1–1	1–0	0–2	1–2
Fakel	1–0	2–1	3–3		1–0	0–0	0–0	3–2	3–1	1–0	1–0	1–0	0–1	3–0	3–0	2–0	0–1	1–0	1–0	3–1
KAMAZ	1–2	1–1	0–1	2–1		2–0	0–0	3–0	0–1	1–1	0–4	0–2	1–2	4–1	1–0	2–1	0–0	1–3	0–0	1–1
Krasnodar-2	2–0	1–3	0–3	1–2	4–1		1–2	1–0	2–0	2–0	5–2	1–1	3–1	1–3	1–1	2–1	1–1	0–0	1–0	4–0
Kuban Krasnodar	2–0	5–5	1–1	0–4	1–0	0–0		0–3	0–2	0–2	0–1	2–1	1–0	1–2	1–0	2–2	1–2	0–2	1–3	2–1
Metallurg Lipetsk	2–2	0–3	0–4	1–2	0–1	1–2	0–2		1–2	0–0	1–0	0–1	1–1	0–2	0–0	3–2	1–3	1–0	1–0	0–2
Neftekhimik	0–0	5–2	0–0	3–0	1–1	4–1	0–3	5–0		1–0	2–1	1–3	0–0	5–0	3–1	0–1	0–1	2–1	0–1	2–3
Olimp-Dolgoprudny	0–2	1–1	0–2	2–0	1–1	0–1	1–0	1–0	2–4		0–0	2–2	1–1	1–4	1–0	1–0	3–3	0–2	2–1	0–0
Orenburg	1–0	0–0	2–1	0–2	2–0	2–0	1–3	4–0	1–0	2–2		0–3	2–0	2–1	2–0	2–1	1–0	2–1	4–0	2–0
Rotor Volgograd	1–2	0–0	1–1	1–2	1–0	1–2	1–3	0–1	2–1	1–1	0–3		0–0	0–1	0–0	1–5	1–1	0–3	1–1	2–3
SKA-Khabarovsk	0–3	2–0	0–2	2–1	1–0	1–0	1–0	1–0	3–1	3–3	1–0	3–1		0–1	4–0	2–0	0–1	2–0	1–0	4–3
Spartak-2 Moscow	0–1	3–2	1–2	2–0	3–0	0–0	0–0	3–2	0–4	0–2	2–3	1–1	1–1		2–1	3–1	0–1	0–2	1–0	2–1
Tekstilshchik	2–2	0–4	3–2	0–5	4–1	0–1	1–3	1–2	1–0	3–1	2–5	1–3	0–3	1–2		1–1	1–1	2–0	1–2	0–1
Tom Tomsk	2–1	1–3	1–0	2–2	1–0	1–2	2–1	2–2	1–1	1–1	1–2	1–1	1–0	1–0	1–0		2–5	1–0	2–1	0–1
Torpedo Moscow	0–0	3–1	2–2	2–2	1–1	2–0	2–2	7–1	1–1	1–0	2–1	1–0	0–0	5–0	0–0	3–3		1–0	1–0	2–1
Veles Moscow	1–1	2–2	1–1	0–4	0–0	3–1	1–0	1–2	1–2	1–0	1–2	3–1	1–2	2–1	3–2	1–0	3–5		0–2	1–0
Volgar	1–0	1–1	2–2	0–2	0–1	0–0	0–2	0–2	1–0	0–1	2–2	2–0	1–1	1–0	1–1	0–3	0–1	0–1		2–3
Yenisey	3–2	0–3	1–0	2–1	0–0	2–0	2–2	2–1	2–0	1–0	1–2	1–1	3–1	2–1	3–0	2–3	0–1	3–2	2–2	

Source: Soccerway
Legend: Blue = home team win; Yellow = draw; Red = away team win.

== Season statistics ==
=== Top goalscorers ===
As of matches played on 21 May 2022.

Rank	Player	Club	Goals
1	(Russia) Maksim Maksimov	Fakel Voronezh	22
2	(Russia) Aleksandr Yushin	Neftekhimik	18
3	(Russia) Aleksandr Stavpets	Tomsk	17
4	(Ghana) Joel Fameyeh	Orenburg	15
4	(Russia) Mukhammad Sultonov	Torpedo Moscow	15
6	(Russia) David Karayev	SKA-Khabarovsk	14
6	(Russia) Islam Mashukov	Alania	14
8	(Russia) Artur Galoyan	Veles Moscow	13
8	(Russia) Amur Kalmykov	Torpedo Moscow	13
8	(Russia) Vladislav Shitov	Spartak-2 Moscow	13
