= Volgograd Arena =

Football stadium in Volgograd, Russia

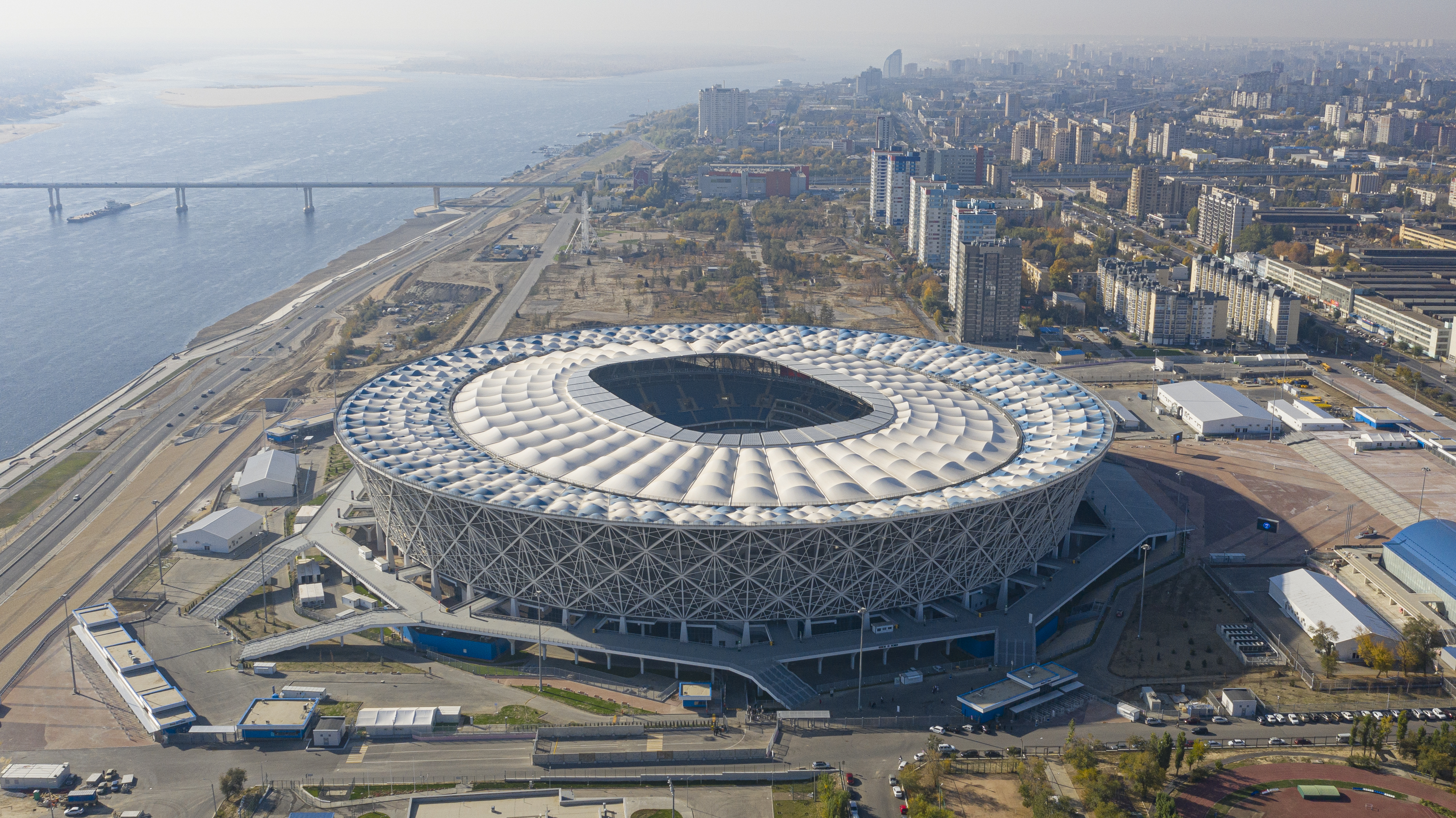
- UEFA
- Interactive map of Volgograd Arena
- Full name: Volgograd Arena
- Location: Lenina Ave 76, Volgograd, Russia
- Coordinates: 48°44′04″N 44°32′55″E
- Capacity: 45,568 (Official); 43,713 (2018 FIFA World Cup)
- Surface: Desso GrassMaster
- Field size: 105 by 68 m (344 by 223 ft)

Construction
- Groundbreaking: 2014
- Built: 2014–2017
- Opened: 2018
- Cost: ₽16.3 billion (€220 million)

Tenant
- FC Rotor Volgograd (2018–present)

The Volgograd Arena (Russian: «Волгоград Арена») is a football stadium in Volgograd, Russia. The stadium was one of the venues for the 2018 FIFA World Cup. It also hosts FC Rotor Volgograd. It has a capacity of 45,568 spectators.

== History ==
The stadium was built on site of the demolished Central Stadium, at the foot of the Mamayev Kurgan memorial complex, near the Volga River. The previous stadium was built in 1958, on the site of a former oil depot. This area was undeveloped, occupied by randomly distributed low-value buildings, warehouses, barracks and ravines. During construction of the stadium, 300 unexploded bombs were discovered and removed from the site.

== World Cup 2018 ==
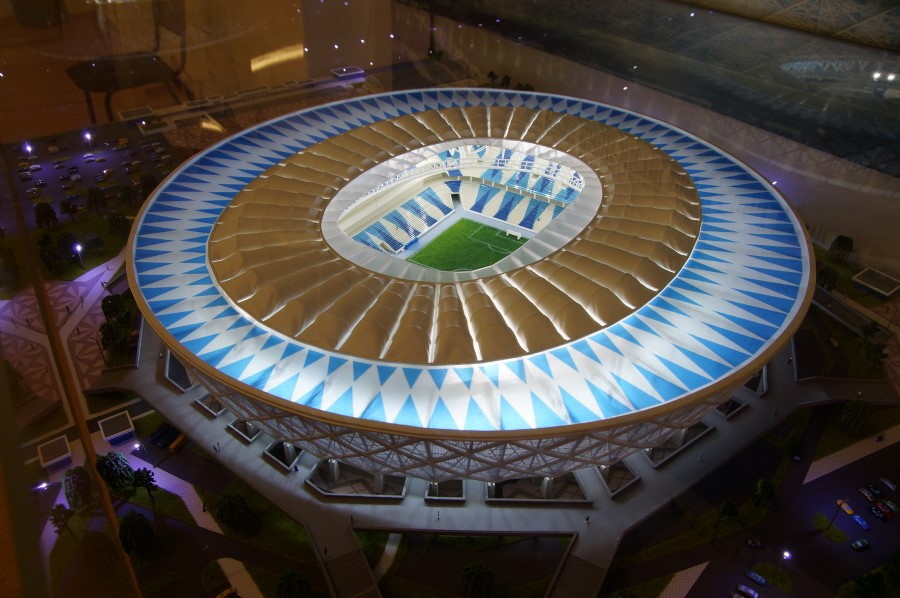
Scale model of Volgograd Arena

The Arena was designed by PI Arena and GMP Architekten, the winner of an open tender. Stroytransgaz was the project's general construction contractor. Initially, local authorities estimated the total project cost, including the construction works, at 10 billion rubles. In October 2014, the preliminary construction cost of the stadium for the 2018 FIFA World Cup was adjusted to 17 billion rubles. The stadium's capacity is at 45,000 seats, including 2,280 seats in the media box, 640 seats in the VIP box, and 460 seats for people with limited mobility. A special architectural feature of the stadium is its large roof resting on a cable frame, arranged in a “bicycle wheel” pattern created by steel-wire cables. The Volgograd Arena is shaped like an overturned truncated cone 49.5 m tall and about 303 m in diameter. The façade shape is dictated by the need to fit the building compactly into the available piece of land. The stadium has 42 elevators, 24 of them adapted for people with disabilities. The Volgograd Arena is equipped with a sound system.

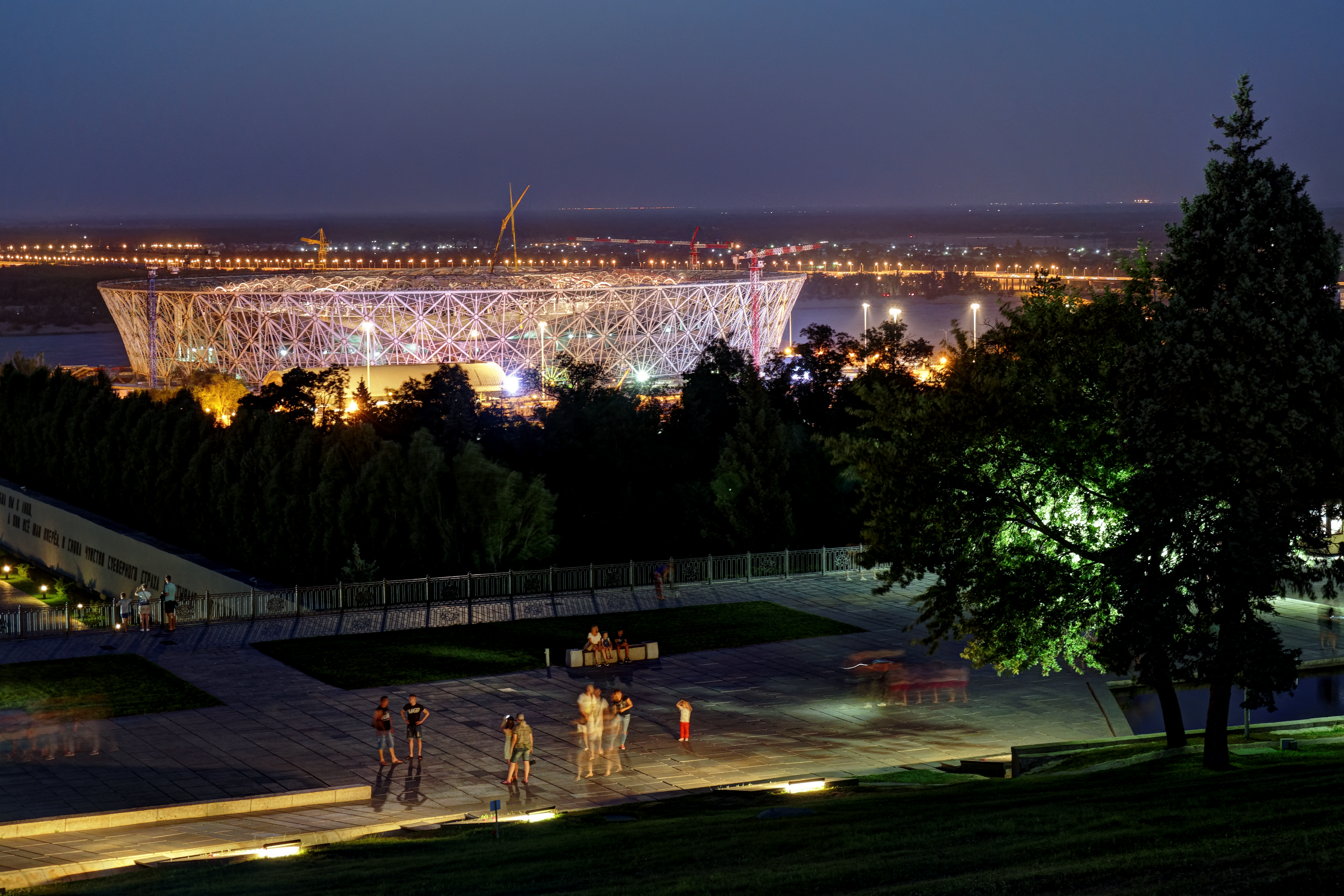
Volgograd Arena in the night

The stadium was inaugurated on April 3, 2018, shortly before the first FIFA World Cup match on April 21, 2018. Football veterans, among them Alexander Nikitin and Valery Yesipov, were honored in an honoring ceremony before the first match.

== Security ==
By the opening of the 2018 FIFA World Cup, the stadium was equipped with alarm and public alert systems, metal detectors, indicators of hazardous liquids and explosives, and the facility was serviced by 30 posts of 24-hour security posts.

== 2018 FIFA World Cup ==
Date	Time	Team #1	Result	Team #2	Round	Attendance
18 June 2018	21:00	Tunisia	1–2	England	Group G	41,064
22 June 2018	18:00	Nigeria	2–0	Iceland	Group D	40,904
25 June 2018	17:00	Saudi Arabia	2–1	Egypt	Group A	36,823
28 June 2018	17:00	Japan	0–1	Poland	Group H	42,189

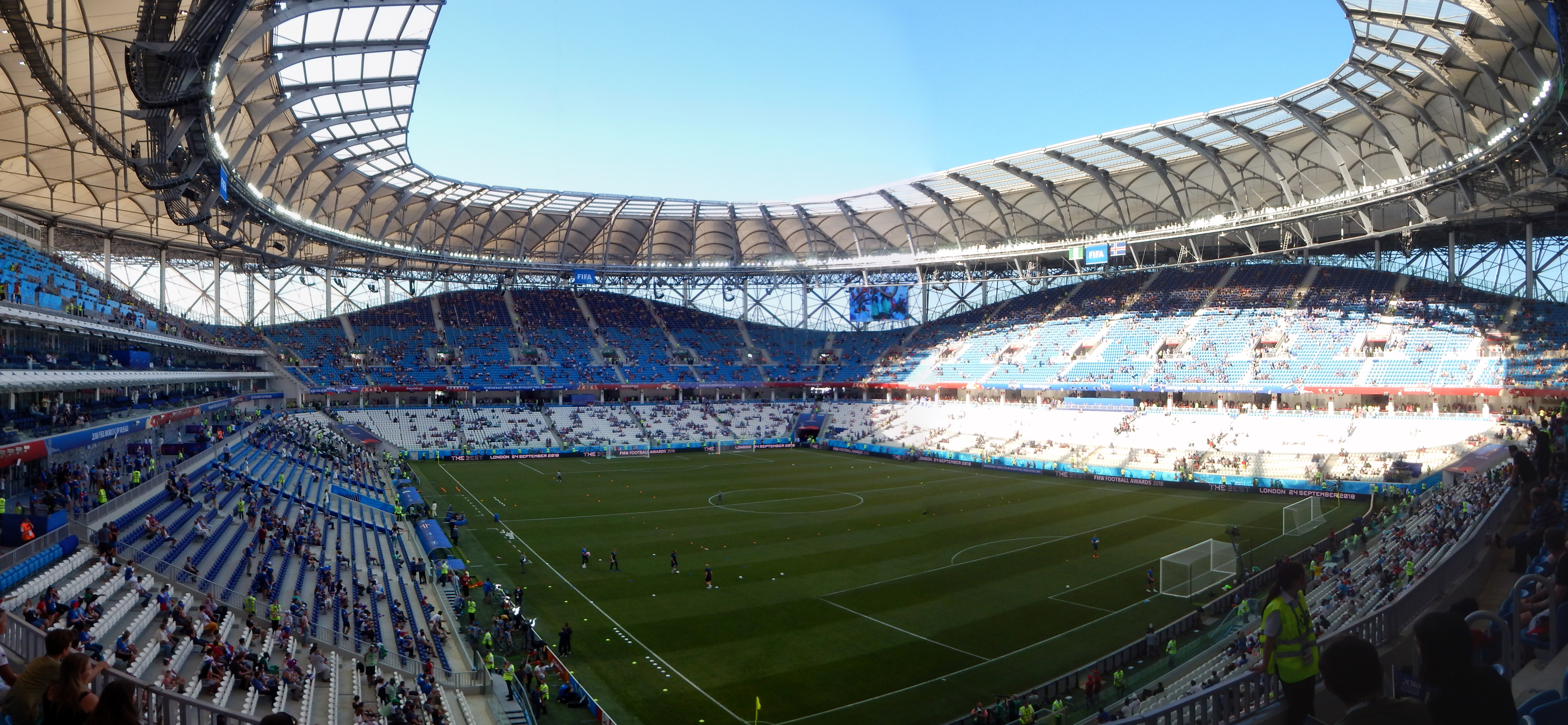
Volgograd Arena before the match between Nigeria and Iceland on June 22, 2018

== After the 2018 FIFA World Cup ==
After the World Cup, the arena reduced its seating capacity to 43,000 and was handed over to the local Rotor Volgograd.
