= FNL Cup =

- Founded: 2012
- Region: Russia
- Teams: 16
- Current champions: FC Khimki (1 title)
- Most championships: FC Ural Yekaterinburg (3 titles)
- Website: 1fnl.ru
- 2019 FNL Cup

National Football League Cup is a Russian football competition, held among the best teams of Russian Football National League in the winter break.

== History ==
The first cup was held in 2012. On 1 December 2011, it was reported that the cup rules were approved. According to those rules, the teams are divided into two groups. In 2015 FNL Cup the clubs was divided into four groups.

It is not mandatory for FNL clubs to participate, and in cases when some do refuse to, Russian Professional Football League or Russian Premier League teams are invited to fill the spots. In the 2016 edition, FC Volgar Astrakhan fielded two squads.

== Winners ==
Year	Date of Final	Winner	Score	Runner-up	Stadium	Att.
2012	20 Feb	FC Ural Yekaterinburg (1); 11' Safronidi	1–0	FC Shinnik Yaroslavl	Paralimni Stadium; Paralimni, Cyprus	100
2013	19 Feb	FC Ural Yekaterinburg (2); 46' Petrović 49' Petrović 59' Chukhley	3–1	FC Tom Tomsk; 40' Bendz	Pafiako Stadium; Paphos, Cyprus	250
2014	20 Feb	FC Luch-Energiya Vladivostok (1); 68' Asildarov	1–0	FC Torpedo Moscow	Bellis Sport Center; Belek, Turkey	500
2015	23 Feb	FC Volgar Astrakhan (1); 37' Alkhazov 52' Krendelev	2–2; 8–7 (p)	FC Tom Tomsk; 45+' Bazhenov 48' Nyakhaychyk	Bellis Sport Center; Belek, Turkey	500
2016	23 Feb	FC Gazovik Orenburg (1); 78' Koronov	1–0	FC Shinnik Yaroslavl	Ammochostos Stadium; Larnaca, Cyprus	
2017	24 Feb	FC Fakel Voronezh (1); 82' Nagibin	1–0	FC Chertanovo Moscow	Tsirio Stadium; Limassol, Cyprus	
2018	23 Feb	FC Ural Yekaterinburg (3); 24' El Kabir	1–1; 4–2 (p)	FC Luch-Energiya Vladivostok; 44' Pavlenko	Stelios Kyriakides Stadium; Paphos, Cyprus	
2019	20 Feb	Avangard Kursk (1); 80' Zemskov	1–1; 4–3 (p)	FC Rotor Volgograd; 86' Sanaya	Kouklia Community Stadium; Kouklia, Cyprus	
2020	27 Feb	FC Khimki (1); 3' Barkov 13' Koryan 32', 26', 54' Polyarus 38' Troshechkin 78' Skvortsov	7–0	FC Tambov	Stelios Kyriakides Stadium; Paphos, Cyprus	

== 2020 final ranking ==
Rank	Team	Record
1	FC Khimki	3–2–0
2	FC Tambov*	2–2–1
3	FC Shinnik Yaroslavl**	3–1–1
4	FC KAMAZ Naberezhnye Chelny**	1–2–2
5	(Latvia) Riga FC	4–0–1
6	FC Ural Yekaterinburg/FC Ural-2 Yekaterinburg	2–1–2
7	FC Chertanovo Moscow	2–1–2
8	Russia national under-20 football team	1–1–3
9	FC Fakel Voronezh	2–2–1
10	FC SKA Rostov-on-Don	1–2–2
11	PFC Krylia Sovetov Samara (young team)	2–2–1
12	FC Yenisey Krasnoyarsk	1–2–2
13	FC Rotor Volgograd	2–2–1
14	FC Mordovia Saransk	0–1–4
15	FC Rodina Moscow	2–0–3
16	FC Tom Tomsk	0–3–2

* In the final match, FC Tambov did not play in the main team (the main squad of FC Tambov left the tournament early).

** FC Shinnik Yaroslavl was awarded walkover in match for 3rd place (FC KAMAZ left the tournament early).

== Performance by club ==
Pl.	Club	Winner	Runner-up	Winning years	Runner-up years
1	FC Ural Yekaterinburg	3	0	2012, 2013, 2018	
2	FC Luch-Energiya Vladivostok	1	1	2014	2018
3	FC Volgar Astrakhan	1	0	2015	
3	FC Orenburg	1	0	2016	
3	FC Fakel Voronezh	1	0	2017	
3	FC Khimki	1	0	2020	
7	FC Tom Tomsk	0	2		2013, 2015
7	FC Shinnik Yaroslavl	0	2		2012, 2016
9	FC Torpedo Moscow	0	1		2014
9	FC Chertanovo Moscow	0	1		2017
9	FC Tambov	0	1		2020
