= 2026–27 Russian Cup =

2026–27 Fonbet Russian Cup

Tournament details
- Country: Russia
- Teams: 102

The 2026–27 Russian Cup is the 35th season of the Russian football knockout tournament since the dissolution of the Soviet Union. The competition started on 29 July 2026 and will conclude on 6 June 2027.

The winner of the cup would normally gain entry into the 2027–28 UEFA Europa League; however, on 28 February 2022, Russian football clubs were suspended from FIFA & UEFA international competitions until further notice due to the Russian invasion of Ukraine.

== Representation of clubs by league ==
- Russian Premier League (1): 16 clubs
- Russian First League (2): 18 clubs
- Division A of Russian Second League (3): 15 clubs (without 3 farm teams)
- Division B of Russian Second League (4): 37 clubs (without 16 farm teams and 5 Crimean teams)
- Amateur leagues:
  - Third division (5): 13 clubs (2 of which, Fankom Kirov and Krasnoye Znamya Noginsk, was merged for this cup season with media clubs (Broke Boys Moscow and SindEkat Yekaterinburg, respectively).
  - Fourth division (regional leagues) (6): 0 clubs
  - Media amateur clubs (7): 3 clubs
- Total: 102 clubs.

== Distribution ==
The teams of Premier League and the other teams will qualify to knockout phase in two different paths. Premier league teams will play in the RPL path group stage with a double round-robin tournament, divided into 4 groups with 4 teams in each group, while the other teams will play in the regions path qualification, starting with 1/256 round until 1/8 round with 1 match in each stage.

== Schedule ==
The schedule of the competition is as follows:

Phase	Round			Match date
Qualifying rounds (regions path)	Round 1			28–30 July 2026
Qualifying rounds (regions path)	Round 2			11–13 August 2026
Qualifying rounds (regions path)	Round 3			25–27 August 2026
Qualifying rounds (regions path)	Round 4			8–10 September 2026
Qualifying rounds (regions path)	Round 5			14–16 October 2026
Qualifying rounds (regions path)	Round 6			3–5 November 2026
Group stage (RPL path)	Matchday 1			4–6 August 2026
Group stage (RPL path)	Matchday 2			18–20 August 2026
Group stage (RPL path)	Matchday 3			1–3 September 2026
Group stage (RPL path)	Matchday 4			13–15 October 2026
Group stage (RPL path)	Matchday 5			27–29 October 2026
Group stage (RPL path)	Matchday 6			24–26 November 2026
Knockout stage	Eighth-finals (Last 16)	RPL path	Match 1	2–4 March 2027
Knockout stage	Eighth-finals (Last 16)	RPL path	Match 2	16–18 March 2027
Knockout stage	Eighth-finals (Last 16)	Regions path	Stage 1	17–19 March 2027
Knockout stage	Eighth-finals (Last 16)	Regions path	Stage 2	7–9 April 2027
Knockout stage	Quarter-finals	RPL path	Match 1	6–8 April 2027
Knockout stage	Quarter-finals	RPL path	Match 2	20–22 April 2027
Knockout stage	Quarter-finals	Regions path	Stage 1	21–23 April 2027
Knockout stage	Quarter-finals	Regions path	Stage 2	5–7 May 2027
Knockout stage	Semi-finals	RPL path	Match 1	4–6 May 2027
Knockout stage	Semi-finals	RPL path	Match 2	18–20 May 2027
Knockout stage	Semi-finals	Regions path		19–21 May 2027
Knockout stage	Final			6 June 2027

== Qualifying round (regions path) ==
The draw for all rounds in regions path was held on 19 June 2026.

=== Round 1 ===
Entered clubs:

- 16 clubs from Amateur leagues
- 8 lowest clubs from Russian Second League Division B

Date of matches was determined on 28–30 July 2026.

Times are MSK (UTC+3), as listed by RFU (local times, if different, are in parentheses).

28 July 2026	BoMiK Tsivilsk (5)	1–2	Fankom Broke Boys Kirov (5)	Kazan
15:00	Volkov 87'	Report	Khvastukhin 31'; Zemskov 60'	Stadium: Trudovye Rezervy Stadium; Attendance: 421; Referee: Stanislav Brashchin

28 July 2026	Anzhi Makhachkala (5)	1–5	Neftyanik Izberbash (4)	Makhachkala
17:00	Vagidov 41'; Idrisov (red card) 77'	Report	Magomedov 16'; Temirsultanov 37'; Manapov 75'; Kurbanov 86'; Karayev 90+3'	Stadium: Trud Stadium; Attendance: 1,800; Referee: Maksim Bogdanavichus

28 July 2026	Kristall-MEZT Borisoglebsk (5)	3–0	Salyut Belgorod (4)	Voronezh
19:00	Sapelnikov 6'; Pospelov 14'; Borisov 59'	Report		Stadium: Fakel Stadium; Attendance: 1,658; Referee: Aleksey Morozan

28 July 2026	2DROTS Moscow (7)	2–0	Oryol (4)	Moscow
20:00	Frolov (yellow card) 12' (yellow-red card) 90'; Mazurov 30'; Chernomyrdin 37'	Report		Stadium: Cosmos Arena Stadium; Attendance: 1,400; Referee: Vladislav Egorov

29 July 2026	Ilpar Perm Krai (5)	1–0	Metallurg Asha (5)	Perm
17:00 (19:00 YEKT)	Ponomarev 14'; Ashurbekov (yellow card) 53' (yellow-red card) 60'	Report	Opoku (yellow card) 80' (yellow-red card) 90+5'	Stadium: Zvezda Stadium; Attendance: 640; Referee: Vladislav Demyanchuk

29 July 2026	Moskovskaya zastava-Kristall Saint Petersburg (5)	2–3	Krasnoye Znamya SindEkat Noginsk (5)	Saint-Petersburg
17:30	Titov 8'; Godzoev 86'	Report	Filintsov 5' (o.g.); Gerasimov 20'; Doronin 71'	Stadium: Nova Arena Stadium; Attendance: 292; Referee: Andrey Meshkov

29 July 2026	SSH Kirovets-Voskhozhdeniye Saint Petersburg (5)	0–3	Tosno Saint Petersburg (5)	Saint-Petersburg
18:00		Report	Magomedov 56'; Yatchev (yellow card) 70' (yellow-red card) 71'; Ayloyan 73', 87'	Stadium: Kirovets Stadium; Attendance: 490; Referee: Sergey Kolesnik

29 July 2026	SKA Rostov (7)	2–2 (6–5 p)	Zenit Penza (4)	Moscow
20:00	Korzh 12'; Simonov 62' (pen.)	Report	Vezikov 40'; Geykin 90+3'	Stadium: Cosmos Arena Stadium; Attendance: 502; Referee: Petr Shilin
	Penalties
	Nababkin (penalty scored); Gashchenkov (penalty scored); Gerchikov (penalty scored); Eremenko (penalty scored); Gorovykh (penalty missed); Kudryashov (penalty scored); Khalnazarov (penalty scored)		(penalty scored) Skrypnikov; (penalty scored) Terechev; (penalty scored) Rodionov; (penalty scored) Shamsudinov; (penalty missed) Terechev; (penalty scored) Belik; (penalty missed) Kurakin

30 July 2026	Anri Vladivostok (5)	1–2	Dynamo Barnaul (4)	Vladivostok
12:30 (19:30 VLAT)	Gordiyenko 44'; Yanzin (red card) 86'	Report	Perevoznikov 34'; Mogel 61'	Stadium: Dynamo Stadium; Attendance: 711; Referee: Makar Yanchuk

30 July 2026	Temp Barnaul (5)	3–4	KDV Tomsk (4)	Barnaul
15:00 (19:00 KRAT)	Mizgirev 16'; Shibaev 64', 90+2' (pen.)	Report	Nikiforov 7'; Stepanenko 18'; Lavrishchev 45+2', 56'	Stadium: Dynamo Stadium; Attendance: 2,572; Referee: Mikhail Yakovlev

30 July 2026	FC 10 Moscow (7)	3–2	Kosmos Khimki (4)	Moscow
20:00	Kutuzov 27', 73'; Balashov 67'	Report	Sharkov 1'; Lysov 53' (o.g.)	Stadium: Cosmos Arena Stadium; Attendance: 1,033; Referee: Oleg Snegirev

30 July 2026	SSH Chita (5)	3–0 (awd.) (Note: On 22 July 2026, Irkutsk was dissolved.On 30 July 2026, the RFS Control and Disciplinary Committee was declared about failure of Irkutsk to appear for a Russian Cup match without a valid reason. The club was excluded from cup competition, and the game was awarded 3–0 to SSH Chita.)	Irkutsk (4)
:

=== Round 2 ===
Entered clubs:

- 12 winners of Round 1
- 29 highest clubs from Russian Second League Division B
- 15 clubs from Russian Second League Division A

Date of matches was determined on 11–13 August 2026. Times are MSK (UTC+3), as listed by RFU (local times, if different, are in parentheses).

11 August 2026	Dynamo Saint Petersburg (4)	2–1	FC 10 Moscow (7)	Saint Petersburg
17:00	Masalov 44'; Kubyshkin (yellow card) 26' (yellow-red card) 90'; Yezhkov 90+3'	Report	Gaynullin 66'	Stadium: Kirovets Stadium; Attendance: 1,650; Referee: Evgeniy Timofeev

11 August 2026	Kvant Obninsk (4)	0–2	Ryazan (4)	Obninsk
18:30		Report	Lee-Sa 30'; Pogrebnev 47'	Stadium: Trud Stadium; Attendance: 227; Referee: Vladislav Shipkov

11 August 2026	Nart Cherkessk (4)	1–2	Dynamo Stavropol (3)	Cherkessk
19:30	Garayev 69' (o.g.)	Report	Dzhumayev 58'; Shilov 90'	Stadium: Nart Stadium; Attendance: 1,347; Referee: Mikhail Yakovlev

12 August 2026	Avangard Kursk (4)	1–1 (5–4 p)	Kristall-MEZT Borisoglebsk (5)	Kursk
13:00	Knyazev 22' (pen.) (red card) 45+1'	Report	Altukhov 36'	Stadium: Trudovye Rezervy Stadium; Attendance: 0 (Note: Due to the complicated situation in the Kursk region, Avangard will played this match without spectators.); Referee: Vladislav Demyanchuk
	Penalties
	Kozyrev (penalty scored); Gershun (penalty scored); Zakharov (penalty scored); Borisov (penalty scored); Khrebtov (penalty scored)		(penalty missed) Sapelnikov; (penalty scored) Vnukov; (penalty scored) Furtsev; (penalty scored) Pospelov; (penalty scored) Altukhov

12 August 2026	Volna Nizhny Novgorod Oblast (4)	2–1	Tyumen (3)	Zavolzhye
13:30	Zabotkin 10'; Bogdanets 75' (pen.)	Report	Talikin 61'	Stadium: Zavolzhsky sports complex stadium Attendance: 212; Referee: Artem Kharin

12 August 2026	Dynamo Barnaul (4)	0–0 (4–3 p)	Dynamo Vladivostok (3)	Barnaul
14:00 (18:00 KRAT)		Report		Stadium: Dynamo Stadium; Attendance: 850; Referee: Aleksey Morozan
	Penalties
	Vorona (penalty scored); Bakay (penalty scored); Sablin (penalty scored); Mogel (penalty missed); Shadura (penalty scored)		(penalty missed) Pesikov; (penalty scored) Bolatayev; (penalty scored) Yapryntsev; (penalty scored) Antsiperov; (penalty missed) Burkin

12 August 2026	Zvezda Saint Petersburg (4)	1–2	Luki-Energiya Velikiye Luki (4)	Saint Petersburg
14:00	Koldunov 31' (pen.)	Report	Lunyov 20'; Dibirgadzhiyev 26'	Stadium: Nova Arena Stadium; Attendance: 223; Referee: Davud Magomedov

12 August 2026	KDV Tomsk (4)	2–2 (5–4 p)	Sibir Novosibirsk (3)	Tomsk
15:00 (19:00 KRAT)	Kondrakov 81'; Stepanenko 90+4'	Report	Alizade 21', 89'	Stadium: Temp Stadium; Attendance: 2,815; Referee: Vitaliy Evdokimov
	Penalties
	Kondrakov (penalty scored); Simdyankin (penalty scored); Paliyenko (penalty scored); Starodub (penalty scored); Denisov (penalty scored)		(penalty scored) Makurin; (penalty scored) Zapalatsky; (penalty scored) Yangaev; (penalty scored) Alizade; (penalty missed) Popkov

12 August 2026	Krasnoye Znamya SindEkat Noginsk (5)	2–0	Dynamo Bryansk (3)	Domodedovo
15:00	Bushuev 40'; Yershov 60'	Report		Stadium: Avangard Stadium; Attendance: 122; Referee: Evgeniy Rubtsov

12 August 2026	Irtysh Omsk (3)	1–1 (4–2 p)	Saturn Ramenskoye (4)	Omsk
16:00 (19:00 OMST)	Razborov 51' (pen.)	Report	Koverov 73'	Stadium: Indoor arena SSH "Red Star" Stadium; Attendance: 1,250; Referee: Aleksandr Rib
	Penalties
	Kovalchuk (penalty scored); Makarov (penalty scored); Zhustjev (penalty scored); Yanushkovsky (penalty scored); Orazayev (penalty scored)		(penalty scored) Tyurin; (penalty scored) Kupriyanov; (penalty missed) Tsechoev; (penalty missed) Vilgelm

12 August 2026	Angusht Nazran (4)	0–0 (2–4 p)	Druzhba Maykop (4)	Nazran
16:00		Report		Stadium: Rashid Aushev Central Stadium; Attendance: 280; Referee: Islam Gaziev
	Penalties
	Khalibegov (penalty scored); Zaynavov (penalty missed); Aliev (penalty missed); Yevloyev (penalty scored)		(penalty scored) Konov; (penalty scored) Delok; (penalty scored) Solop; (penalty missed) Malysh; (penalty scored) Yedygov

12 August 2026	Shumbrat Saransk (4)	1–1 (4–5 p)	2DROTS Moscow (7)	Saransk
17:00	Molodtsov 25'	Report	Polyutkin 90+3'	Stadium: Mordovia Arena; Attendance: 14,573; Referee: Artem Klyuev
	Penalties
	Karpov (penalty scored); Yusupov (penalty scored); Chubukin (penalty scored); Golubtsov (penalty missed); Abramov (penalty scored); Yermakov (penalty missed)		(penalty missed) Mazurov; (penalty scored) Edams; (penalty scored) Volodkin; (penalty scored) Chernomyrdin; (penalty scored) Morozov; (penalty scored) Shikhbabaev

12 August 2026	Kaluga (3)	5–0	Iskra Smolensk (4)	Kaluga
17:00	Bakharev 11', 21'; Pervakov 15'; Sukhanov 70'; Klishchenko 84'	Report		Stadium: Sputnik Stadium; Attendance: 477; Referee: Yan Marushko

12 August 2026	Amkar Perm (3)	2–0	Pobeda Nizhny Novgorod (4)	Perm
17:00 (19:00 YEKT)	Matsukatov 52'; Goldobin 69'	Report		Stadium: Zvezda Stadium; Attendance: 2,497; Referee: Maksim Sukhanov

12 August 2026	Fankom Broke Boys Kirov (5)	0–2	Dynamo Kirov (3)	Kirov
17:00		Report	Filippov 71'; Bilalov 80'	Stadium: VyatSShOR Stadium; Attendance: 1,460; Referee: Egor Kurakin

12 August 2026	Astrakhan (4)	1–1 (4–3 p)	Mashuk-KMV Pyatigorsk (3)	Astrakhan
18:00 (19:00 SAMT)	Kudryashov 21'	Report	Gystarov 32'	Stadium: Aleksandr Kolosov Stadium; Attendance: 498; Referee: Evgeniy Sedov
	Penalties
	Patcho (penalty missed); Polushin (penalty scored); Zhokhov (penalty scored); Zolotorenko (penalty scored); Galochkin (penalty scored)		(penalty missed) Magomadov; (penalty scored) Khagur; (penalty scored) Bogomolov; (penalty missed) Konyukhov; (penalty scored) Gystarov

12 August 2026	Murom (4)	0–0 (5–3 p)	Metallurg Lipetsk (4)	Murom
18:00		Report		Stadium: Viktor Losev Stadium; Attendance: 1,200; Referee: Daniil Logvinov
	Penalties
	Livadnov (penalty scored); Saaduyev (penalty scored); Andreyev (penalty scored); Abdullayev (penalty scored); Orazayev (penalty scored)		(penalty scored) Skvortsov; (penalty missed) Chernyakov; (penalty scored) Vedeneyev; (penalty scored) Chikhradze

12 August 2026	Izhevsk (4)	1–2	Torpedo Miass (3)	Izhevsk
18:00 (19:00 SAMT)	Bocharov 84' (pen.)	Report	Yugaldin 50'; Balakhonov 69'	Stadium: Kupol Stadium; Attendance: 2,600; Referee: Vladimir Sivkov

12 August 2026	Sokol Saratov (3)	3–1	Ilpar Perm Krai (5)	Saratov
18:00 (19:00 SAMT)	Shubin (yellow card) 32' (yellow-red card) 90+3'; Klementyev 45+1'; Shpitalny 51'; Kostin 90' (pen.)	Report	Skryabin 43'	Stadium: Lokomotiv Stadium; Attendance: 1,342; Referee: Artem Kataykin

12 August 2026	Strogino Moscow (4)	0–3	Torpedo Vladimir (4)	Moscow
18:00		Report	Simakov 1'; Chernenko 64'; Popov 67'	Stadium: Yantar Stadium; Attendance: 200; Referee: Pavel Klipikov

12 August 2026	Tosno Saint Petersburg (5)	0–0 (4–5 p)	Cherepovets (4)	Veliky Novgorod
19:00		Report		Stadium: Elektron Stadium; Attendance: 957; Referee: Vasiliy Smirnov
	Penalties
	Pichugin (penalty scored); Ayloyan (penalty missed); Stepanov (penalty scored); Gorbachev (penalty scored); Magomedov (penalty scored); Kamyanskiy (penalty missed)		(penalty scored) Antsiferov; (penalty missed) Belyayev; (penalty scored) Mikhaylovskiy; (penalty scored) Khalygov; (penalty scored) Ganus; (penalty scored) Berezov

12 August 2026	Spartak Tambov (4)	1–1 (4–2 p)	SKA Rostov (7)	Tambov
19:00	Nababkin 81' (o.g.)	Report	Tugarev 28'; Karyaka (red card) FT	Stadium: Spartak Stadium; Attendance: 3,450; Referee: Dmitriy Prokopov
	Penalties
	Osinov (penalty scored); Petrov (penalty missed); Gurchenko (penalty scored); Shmarov (penalty scored); Kuptsov (penalty scored)		(penalty missed) Simonov; (penalty missed) Gashchenkov; (penalty scored) Eremenko; (penalty scored) Gorovykh

12 August 2026	Khimik Dzerzhinsk (4)	2–3	Nosta Novotroitsk (4)	Dzerzhinsk
19:00	Izotov 64'; Shirokov 90'	Report	Vayner 3'; Ananyan 42', 67'	Stadium: Khimik Stadium; Attendance: 932; Referee: Vladislav Kokov

12 August 2026	Volgar Astrakhan (3)	2–0	Pobeda Khasavyurt (4)	Astrakhan
19:30 (20:30 SAMT)	Poluboyarinov 55'; Anosov 85'	Report		Stadium: Central Stadium; Attendance: 1,560; Referee: Oleg Snegirev

13 August 2026	Spartak Nalchik (4)	3–3 (4–2 p)	Alania Vladikavkaz (3)	Nalchik
17:00	Kadykoyev 87'; Selyayev 90+3'; Girzishev 90+5'	Report	Ramonov 7'; Abdulkhamidov 33', 35'	Stadium: Spartak Stadium; Attendance: 5,836; Referee: Maksim Bogdanavichus
	Penalties
	Khachirov (penalty scored); Kadykoyev (penalty scored); Goguzokov (penalty scored); Tlupov (penalty scored)		(penalty missed) Gurtsiyev; (penalty scored) Kozyrev; (penalty scored) Kasayev; (penalty missed) Ogoyev

13 August 2026	Dynamo Vologda (4)	2–0	Tver (4)	Vologda
19:30	Kireyev 11' (pen.); Spodarets 45+3' (pen.)	Report		Stadium: Dynamo Stadium; Attendance: 570; Referee: Leonid Vorobyev

	SSH Chita (5)	0–3 (awd.) (Note: SSH Chita officially withdrawn from cup participation due to lack of financial resources.)	Chertanovo Moscow (4)
:

Chayka Peschanokopskoye (3)	Cancelled (Note: Сhayka withdrawn from cup participation.)	Neftyanik Izberbash (4)

=== Round 3 ===
Entered clubs:

- 28 winners of Round 2

Date of matches was determined on 25–27 August 2026.

Times are MSK (UTC+3), as listed by RFU (local times, if different, are in parentheses).

25 August 2026	Avangard Kursk (4)	1–2	Kaluga (3)	Kursk
13:00	Mamkin 21'	Report	Sychev 11', 54'	Stadium: Trudovye Rezervy Stadium; Attendance: 0 (Note: Due to the complicated situation in the Kursk region, Avangard will played this match without spectators.); Referee: Kirill Garafutdinov

25 August 2026	Dynamo Kirov (3)	4–4 (5–4 p)	Amkar Perm (3)	Kirov
17:00	Bilalov 10' (pen.), 47', 60'; Kamayev 76' (pen.)	Report	Agureyev 45' (pen.), 90+2' (pen.); Tyukalov 49'; Goldobin 67' (pen.)	Stadium: VyatSShOR Stadium; Attendance: 1,156; Referee: Nikita Morozov
	Penalties
	Pozdnyakov (penalty scored); Kamayev (penalty scored); Ageyev (penalty scored); Solodarenko (penalty scored); Kolobov (penalty scored)		(penalty scored) Agureyev; (penalty scored) Kumsarov; (penalty scored) Popov; (penalty scored) Novikov; (penalty missed) Snegirev

25 August 2026	Torpedo Vladimir (4)	0–0 (8–9 p)	Krasnoye Znamya SindEkat Noginsk (5)	Vladimir
17:00		Report		Stadium: SSA Torpedo Stadium; Attendance: 765; Referee: Platon Platonov
	Penalties
	Chernenko (penalty missed); Popov (penalty scored); Kolganov (penalty scored); Arkhipenko (penalty scored); Alimkhanov (penalty scored); Dudarev (penalty scored); Glinsky (penalty scored); Sirotov (penalty scored); Safronov (penalty scored); Romanenkov (penalty missed)		(penalty scored) Supagin; (penalty missed) Dontsov; (penalty scored) Shanin; (penalty scored) Dyrchenkov; (penalty scored) Kukushkin; (penalty scored) Doronin; (penalty scored) Granat; (penalty scored) Zakharchenko; (penalty scored) Ponomarev; (penalty scored) Loskutov

25 August 2026	Ryazan (4)	1–1 (4–3 p)	Spartak Tambov (4)	Ryazan
17:00	Yevgenyev 48' (pen.)	Report	Maloletov 42'	Stadium: Ryazan Arena Stadium; Attendance: 1,585; Referee: Vladislav Kokov
	Penalties
	Yevgenyev (penalty scored); Khabibov (penalty missed); Prokurorov (penalty scored); Mishutin (penalty missed); Shishkov (penalty scored); Pogrebnev (penalty missed); Barkov (penalty scored)		(penalty scored) Kuptsov; (penalty scored) Glukhov; (penalty missed) Shmarov; (penalty scored) Khabibulin; (penalty missed) Sergeyev; (penalty missed) Petrov; (penalty missed) Bogdaev

26 August 2026	KDV Tomsk (4)	2–4	Chertanovo Moscow (4)	Tomsk
14:00 (18:00 KRAT)	Kondrakov 53', 62'	Report	Gaynullin 8', 38'; Grachev 13'; Melnikov 59'	Stadium: Temp Stadium; Attendance: 2,830; Referee: Evgeniy Timofeev

26 August 2026	Nosta Novotroitsk (4)	1–1 (4–5 p)	Sokol Saratov (3)	Novotroitsk
14:00 (16:00 YEKT)	Borisov 58'	Report	Malakhov 75'	Stadium: Metallurg Stadium; Attendance: 250; Referee: Vladimir Sivkov
	Penalties
	Ananyan (penalty scored); Pigayev (penalty scored); Bakhysh-Zade (penalty missed); Borisov (penalty scored); Irshev (penalty scored)		(penalty scored) Anisimov; (penalty scored) Sysoyev; (penalty scored) Kostin; (penalty scored) Shpitalny; (penalty scored) Malakhov

26 August 2026	Torpedo Miass (3)	0–1	Volna Nizhny Novgorod Oblast (4)	Miass
14:00 (16:00 YEKT)		Report	Popovich 62' (pen.)	Stadium: Trud Stadium; Attendance: 397; Referee: Aleksandr Rib

26 August 2026	Dynamo Stavropol (3)	1–0	Astrakhan (4)	Yessentuki
17:00	Yagyayev 63' (pen.)	Report		Stadium: Yessentuki Arena Stadium; Attendance: 50; Referee: Oleg Snegirev

26 August 2026	Druzhba Maykop (4)	2–1	Neftyanik Izberbash (4)	Maykop
18:00	Ashev 2'; Delok 90+2'	Report	Manapov (red card) 23'; Isaev 63'	Stadium: Adygea Republican Stadium "Druzhba"; Attendance: 480; Referee: Oleg Makin

26 August 2026	Volgar Astrakhan (3)	3–0	Spartak Nalchik (4)	Astrakhan
19:00 (20:00 SAMT)	Yuran 55'; Anosov 59'; Ivanov 88'	Report		Stadium: Central Stadium; Attendance: 13,600; Referee: Danil Tkachenko

27 August 2026	Dynamo Barnaul (4)	5–0	Irtysh Omsk (3)	Barnaul
13:30 (17:30 KRAT)	Yarkin 11'; Bakay 17'; Perevoznikov 41', 45+3'; Kolmakov 49'	Report		Stadium: Dynamo Stadium; Attendance: 896; Referee: Ivan Pozhidaev

27 August 2026	Luki-Energiya Velikiye Luki (4)	4–1	Cherepovets (4)	Velikiye Luki
16:00	Dibirgadzhiyev 28', 52'; Selyukov 83', 90+3'	Report	Antsiferov 42' (pen.)	Stadium: Ekspress Stadium; Attendance: 557; Referee: Sergey Kolesnik

27 August 2026	Dynamo Saint Petersburg (4)	1–1 (9–8 p)	Dynamo Vologda (4)	Saint-Petersburg
19:30	Kireyenko 57' (pen.)	Report	Burlakov (yellow card) 84' (yellow-red card) 90+2'; Frolov 89'	Stadium: Kirovets Stadium; Attendance: 652; Referee: Timofey Chernyakov
	Penalties
	Smirnov (penalty scored); Vorotnikov (penalty scored); Yezhkov (penalty scored); Popov (penalty scored); Shilov (penalty scored); Orlov (penalty scored); Kuroshev (penalty scored); Borodin (penalty scored); Mansurov (penalty scored)		(penalty scored) Dolgov; (penalty scored) Betyuzhnov; (penalty scored) Petrolay; (penalty scored) Frolov; (penalty scored) Kireyev; (penalty scored) Pronin; (penalty scored) Bykov; (penalty scored) Golovnya; (penalty missed) Krivoruchko

27 August 2026	2DROTS Moscow (7)	0–3	Murom (4)	Moscow
19:30		Report	Saidov 15'; Abdullayev 43' (pen.); Fayzullin 64'	Stadium: Cosmos Arena Stadium; Attendance: 1,452; Referee: Andrey Strelkov

=== Round 4 ===
Entered clubs:

- 14 winners of Round 3
- 18 clubs from Russian First League

Date of matches was determined on 8–10 September 2026.

The draw was consisted of 2 phases. On the first phase, 2 random balls with First League team from pot 2 was relocated to pot 1, then on the second phase usual draw procedure started.

Pot 1	Pot 2
Chertanovo Moscow (4); Druzhba Maykop (4); Dynamo Barnaul (4); Dynamo Kirov (3); Dynamo Saint Petersburg (4); Dynamo Stavropol (3); Kaluga (3); Krasnoye Znamya SindEkat Noginsk (5); Luki-Energiya Velikiye Luki (4); Murom (4); Ryazan (4); Shinnik Yaroslavl (2); Sokol Saratov (3); Tekstilshchik Ivanovo (2); Volgar Astrakhan (3); Volna Nizhny Novgorod Oblast (4)	Arsenal Tula (2); Chelyabinsk (2); KAMAZ Naberezhnye Chelny (2); Leningradets Leningrad Oblast (2); Neftekhimik Nizhnekamsk (2); Nizhny Novgorod (2); Rotor Volgograd (2); Shinnik Yaroslavl (2) → Pot 1; SKA-Khabarovsk (2); Sochi (2); Spartak Kostroma (2); Tekstilshchik Ivanovo (2) → Pot 1; Torpedo Moscow (2); Ufa (2); Ural Yekaterinburg (2); Veles Moscow (2); Volga Ulyanovsk (2); Yenisey Krasnoyarsk (2)

The team from pot 2 that was relocated to pot 1 is written in italics. The team was unknown until it will be drawn from pot 1.

Times are MSK (UTC+3), as listed by RFU (local times, if different, are in parentheses).

8 September 2026	Ryazan (4)	0–2	Spartak Kostroma (2)	Ryazan
17:00		Report	Zhilmostnykh 33'; Rubtsov 44' (pen.)	Stadium: Ryazan Arena Stadium; Attendance: 1,537; Referee: Nikita Morozov

8 September 2026	Tekstilshchik Ivanovo (2)	1–0	Arsenal Tula (2)	Ivanovo
19:30	Dzhebov 46'	Report		Stadium: Tekstilshchik Stadium; Attendance: 2,130; Referee: Aleksey Lapatukhin

9 September 2026	Volna Nizhny Novgorod Oblast (4)	2–0	Rotor Volgograd (2)	Zavolzhye
14:00	Ragulkin 38'; Kalayda 54'	Report		Stadium: Zavolzhsky sports complex stadium Attendance: 370; Referee: Aleksey Morozan

9 September 2026	Krasnoye Znamya SindEkat Noginsk (5)	0–4	SKA-Khabarovsk (2)	Domodedovo
16:00		Report	Gorelishvili 33', 78'; Bragin 51' (pen.); Koryan 57'	Stadium: Avangard Stadium; Attendance: 169; Referee: Vladislav Egorov

9 September 2026	Sokol Saratov (3)	1–1 (5–6 p)	Leningradets Leningrad Oblast (2)	Saratov
17:00 (18:00 SAMT)	Ukomsky 22'	Report	Makaraw 33'	Stadium: Lokomotiv Stadium; Attendance: 664; Referee: Vitaliy Evdokimov
	Penalties
	Anisimov (penalty scored); Sasin (penalty scored); Kostin (penalty scored); Azarov (penalty scored); Perchenok (penalty missed); Sysoyev (penalty scored); Shilyonok (penalty missed); Mayorov (penalty missed)		(penalty missed) Isayev; (penalty scored) Pershin; (penalty scored) Zarypbekov; (penalty scored) Yakovlev; (penalty scored) Kiselyov; (penalty scored) Petukhov; (penalty missed) Maksetsov; (penalty scored) Petrov

9 September 2026	Dynamo Kirov (3)	1–0	KAMAZ Naberezhnye Chelny (2)	Kirov
17:00	Dorofeyev 87'	Report		Stadium: VyatSShOR Stadium; Attendance: 1,360; Referee: Yan Marushko

9 September 2026	Kaluga (3)	1–0	Ufa (2)	Kaluga
17:00	Muminov 38'	Report		Stadium: Sputnik Stadium; Attendance: 653; Referee: Vladimir Falov

9 September 2026	Murom (4)	1–0	Veles Moscow (2)	Murom
17:00	Kozlovskiy 68'; Miroshnichenko (manager) (red card) 82'	Report		Stadium: Viktor Losev Stadium; Attendance: 1,119; Referee: Maksim Bogdanavichus

9 September 2026	Volgar Astrakhan (3)	0–0 (4–5 p)	Volga Ulyanovsk (2)	Astrakhan
18:00 (19:00 SAMT)		Report		Stadium: Central Stadium; Attendance: 2,908; Referee: Vladimir Shamara
	Penalties
	Pavlishin (penalty scored); Lesnikov (penalty scored); Nosov (penalty scored); Anosov (penalty missed); Strelnik (penalty scored); Proshkin (penalty missed)		(penalty scored) Khashkulov; (penalty scored) Stepanov; (penalty scored) Krasilnichenko; (penalty missed) Rakhmanov; (penalty scored) Gershun; (penalty scored) Kostin

9 September 2026	Dynamo Stavropol (3)	1–2	Nizhny Novgorod (2)	Cherkessk
18:30	Karasyov 51'	Report	Lapinsky 17'; Popolitov 73'	Stadium: Nart Stadium; Attendance: 430; Referee: Evgeniy Sedov

9 September 2026	Chertanovo Moscow (4)	1–1 (4–3 p)	Neftekhimik Nizhnekamsk (2)	Moscow
19:00	Gaynullin 24'		Mukba 34'	Stadium: Chertanovo Arena Stadium; Attendance: 452; Referee: Egor Kurakin
	Penalties
	Kondrashov (penalty scored); Semenov (penalty missed); Polyakov (penalty scored); Safronov (penalty scored); Korunov (penalty scored)		(penalty missed) Khomukha; (penalty scored) Kotik; (penalty scored) Pyatkin; (penalty missed) Abdullaev; (penalty scored) Vasilyev

9 September 2026	Dynamo Saint Petersburg (4)	2–0	Sochi (2)	Saint-Petersburg
19:00	Polkovnikov 34'; Masalov 57'	Report		Stadium: Kirovets Stadium; Attendance: 1,102; Referee: Evgeniy Galimov

9 September 2026	Druzhba Maykop (4)	1–1 (4–5 p)	Yenisey Krasnoyarsk (2)	Maykop
19:30	Delok 84'	Report	Lutashev 67'; Egorov (red card) 87'	Stadium: Adygea Republican Stadium "Druzhba"; Attendance: 13,536; Referee: Maksim Sukhanov
	Penalties
	Koblev (penalty missed); Delok (penalty scored); Tsanava (penalty scored); Malysh (penalty scored); Khuako (penalty scored)		(penalty scored) Lutashev; (penalty scored) Kazakov; (penalty scored) Terpugov; (penalty scored) Stepin; (penalty scored) Kravtsov

10 September 2026	Dynamo Barnaul (4)	0–2	Chelyabinsk (2)	Barnaul
13:00 (17:00 KRAT)		Report	Kamenshchikov 66'; Pokotylo 73' (pen.)	Stadium: Dynamo Stadium; Attendance: 1,489; Referee: Danil Tkachenko

10 September 2026	Luki-Energiya Velikiye Luki (4)	2–1	Ural Yekaterinburg (2)	Velikiye Luki
16:30	Edzhibiya 17'; Dibirgadzhiyev 48'	Report	Morozov 90+3'	Stadium: Ekspress Stadium; Attendance: 1,121; Referee: Aleksandr Rib

10 September 2026	Shinnik Yaroslavl (2)	2–0	Torpedo Moscow (2)	Yaroslavl
19:30	Martovoy 30' (pen.); Golubev 76'	Report		Stadium: Shinnik Stadium; Attendance: 2,017; Referee: Kirill Garafutdinov

=== Round 5 ===
Entered clubs:

- 16 winners of Round 4

Date of matches was determined on 13–15 October 2026.

Times are MSK (UTC+3), as listed by RFU (local times, if different, are in parentheses).

13 October 2026	Spartak Kostroma (2)	1–0	Chelyabinsk (2)	Yaroslavl
17:00	Ghurtskaia 48'	Report		Stadium: Shinnik Stadium; Attendance: 478; Referee: Nikita Morozov

14 October 2026	SKA-Khabarovsk (2)	2–0	Dynamo Kirov (3)	Khabarovsk
11:30 (18:30 VLAT)	Gorelishvili 6'; Moțpan 63' (pen.)	Report		Stadium: Lenin Stadium; Attendance: 321; Referee: Makar Yanchuk

14 October 2026	Volna Nizhny Novgorod Oblast (4)	1–1 (4–2 p)	Dynamo Saint Petersburg (4)	Zavolzhye
14:00	Popov 69'	Report	Torosyan 55'	Stadium: Zavolzhsky Stadium; Attendance: 296; Referee: Maksim Sukhanov
	Penalties
	Popov (penalty scored); Kalayda (penalty scored); Gunko (penalty missed); Severyanov (penalty scored); Yamangulov (penalty scored)		(penalty missed) Smirnov; (penalty scored) Borodin; (penalty scored) Yezhkov; (penalty missed) Kireyenko

14 October 2026	Yenisey Krasnoyarsk (2)	2–0	Kaluga (3)	Krasnoyarsk
14:30 (18:30 KRAT)	Tses 24'; Chukanov 72' (pen.)	Report		Stadium: Arena Yenisey; Attendance: 2,457; Referee: Yevgeny Sedov

14 October 2026	Leningradets Leningrad Oblast (2)	2–0	Luki-Energiya Velikiye Luki (4)	Roshchino
15:00	Bachinsky 65'; Nikitin 89'	Report		Stadium: Roshchino Arena; Attendance: 408; Referee: Aleksey Morozan

14 October 2026	Volga Ulyanovsk (2)	0–0 (4–3 p)	Murom (4)	Ulyanovsk
17:00 (18:00 SAMT)		Report		Stadium: Trud Stadium; Attendance: 1,207; Referee: Danil Tkachenko
	Penalties
	Saplinov (penalty missed); Folmer (penalty scored); Krasilnichenko (penalty scored); Nikitin (penalty scored); Kostin (penalty scored)		(penalty scored) Livadnov; (penalty missed) Saaduyev; (penalty scored) Dvoretskov; (penalty missed) Yevseyev; (penalty scored) Abdullayev

14 October 2026	Chertanovo Moscow (4)	2–1	Tekstilshchik Ivanovo (2)	Moscow
19:00	Kavtrev 15'; M. Melnikov 85'	Report	Pomalyuk 37'	Stadium: Arena Chertanovo; Attendance: 438; Referee: Yegor Kurakin

14 October 2026	Nizhny Novgorod (2)	4–0	Shinnik Yaroslavl (2)	Nizhny Novgorod
19:15	Tsarukyan 22'; Bobyor 35'; Popolitov 75'; Chyorny 80' (o.g.)	Report		Stadium: Sovcombank Arena; Attendance: 4,378; Referee: Aleksandr Rib

=== Round 6 ===
Entered clubs:

- 8 winners of Round 5

Times are MSK (UTC+3), as listed by RFU (local times, if different, are in parentheses).

3 November 2026	Spartak Kostroma (2)	2–3	Volna Nizhny Novgorod Oblast (4)	Ivanovo
19:30	Armin Spahić 44'; Bugriyev 65'	Report	Mikhail Zabotkin 8'; Gunko 41'; Bogdanets 53'	Stadium: Tekstilshchik Stadium; Attendance: 612; Referee: Yegor Kurakin

4 November 2026	Yenisey Krasnoyarsk (2)	1–2	Nizhny Novgorod (2)	Krasnoyarsk
11:00 (15:00 KRAT)	Lomakin 9'	Report	Popolitov 36'; Ignatenko 45'	Stadium: Arena Yenisey; Attendance: 2,578; Referee: Aleksey Morozan

4 November 2026	Leningradets Leningrad Oblast (2)	1–1 (3–4 p)	SKA-Khabarovsk (2)	Roshchino
14:00	Dmitry Yakovlev 37' (pen.)	Report	Shkolik 19'	Stadium: Roshchino Arena; Attendance: 1,062; Referee: Vladislav Bykov
	Penalties
	Dmitry Yakovlev (penalty scored); Kiselyov (penalty missed); Zarypbekov (penalty scored); Nikitin (penalty missed); Daniil Rodin (penalty scored)		(penalty scored) Gorelishvili; (penalty missed) Moțpan; (penalty scored) Sadyg Bagiyev; (penalty scored) Bragin; (penalty scored) Shkolik

5 November 2026	Volga Ulyanovsk (2)	5–1	Chertanovo Moscow (4)	Ulyanovsk
19:30 (20:30 SAMT)	Nikitin 29'; Saplinov 70'; Bagateliya 72'; Astemir Khashkulov 83'; Devid Kokoyev 90+2'	Report	Ramil Gaynullin 45+1'; Semyon Semyonov (red card) 69'	Stadium: Trud Stadium; Attendance: 1,137; Referee: Yevgeny Sedov

== Group stage (RPL path) ==
The draw for group stage was held on 19 June 2026.

16 teams of the Russian Premier League (RPL) will start the tournament from the group stage (4 teams in each group). The teams will play 6 matches in the group stage:

- 1st day — 4–6 August;
- 2nd day — 18–20 August;
- 3rd day — 1–3 September;
- 4th day — 13–15 October;
- 5th day — 27–29 October;
- 6th day — 24–26 November.

Pot 1	Pot 2	Pot 3	Pot 4
Zenit Saint Petersburg; Krasnodar; Lokomotiv Moscow; Spartak Moscow	CSKA Moscow; Baltika Kaliningrad; Dynamo Moscow; Rubin Kazan	Akhmat Grozny; Rostov; Krylia Sovetov Samara; Orenburg	Akron Tolyatti; Dynamo Makhachkala; Rodina Moscow; Fakel Voronezh

Composition of the pots is based on results of the 2025–26 Russian Premier League and 2025–26 Russian First League. In the same group there can't be more than 2 teams from Moscow, also FC Fakel Voronezh and FC Rostov can't be in the same group due to logistics restrictions in this cities.

Times are MSK (UTC+3), as listed by RFU (local times, if different, are in parentheses).

=== Group A ===
Pos	Team	Pld	W	PW	PL	L	GF	GA	GD	Pts	Qualification	SPA	ORE	RUB	ROD
1	Spartak Moscow (Q)	5	4	0	1	0	14	5	+9	13	Qualification to the Knockout phase (RPL path)	—	5–1	1–0	3–1
2	Orenburg (Q)	5	3	0	1	1	12	9	+3	10	Qualification to the Knockout phase (RPL path)		—	1–1 (Note: Rubin won 4–2 on penalties.)	2–1
3	Rubin Kazan	5	0	2	0	3	3	12	−9	4	Qualification to the Knockout phase (regions path)	1–1 (Note: Rubin won 5–3 on penalties.)	1–4	—	
4	Rodina Moscow	5	1	0	0	4	10	13	−3	3		2–4	1–4	5–0	—

Updated to match(es) played on 28 October 2026. Source: Russian Football Union (in Russian)
Rules for classification: 1) Points; 2) Head-to-head points; 3) Head-to-head matches won; 4) Head-to-head goal difference; 5) Head-to-head goals scored; 6) Matches won; 7) Goal difference; 8) Goals scored; 9) Penalty shoot-out goal difference; 10) Draw.
(Q) Qualified to the phase indicated
Notes:

4 August 2026 Matchday 1	Rodina Moscow	5–0	Rubin Kazan	Khimki
18:30	Abdusalamov 13', 51'; Yegorychev 59'; Gharibyan 78'; Maksimenko 85'	Report		Stadium: Arena Khimki; Attendance: 2,203; Referee: Vladimir Moskalyov

5 August 2026 Matchday 1	Spartak Moscow	5–1	Orenburg	Moscow
18:30	Solari 26'; Ugalde 33' (pen.), 52'; Umyarov 79'; Polekh 84'	Report	Golybin 81'	Stadium: Lukoil Arena; Attendance: 23,667; Referee: Matvey Zaika

18 August 2026 Matchday 2	Rodina Moscow	1–4	Orenburg	Khimki
18:30	Yegorychev (red card) 6'; Timoshenko 35'	Report	Jesus 2'; Kasadzhikov 45+2'; Puebla 76', 78'	Stadium: Arena Khimki; Attendance: 2,208; Referee: Pavel Shadykhanov

19 August 2026 Matchday 2	Rubin Kazan	1–1 (5–3 p)	Spartak Moscow	Kazan
18:30	Siwe 11'	Report	Ugalde 62'	Stadium: Ak Bars Arena; Attendance: 30,436; Referee: Stanislav Matveev
	Penalties
	Siwe (penalty scored); Gripshi (penalty scored); Jukić (penalty scored); Bezrukov (penalty scored); Vujačić (penalty scored)		(penalty scored) Daku; (penalty missed) Umyarov; (penalty scored) Wooh; (penalty scored) Djiku

2 September 2026 Matchday 3	Orenburg	1–1 (2–4 p)	Rubin Kazan	Orenburg
16:15 (18:15 YEKT)	Kasadzhikov 54'	Report	Siwe 12'	Stadium: Gazovik Stadium; Attendance: 2,905; Referee: Sergey Tsyganok
	Penalties
	Kul (penalty missed); Puebla (penalty missed); Guzina (penalty scored); Khotulyov (penalty scored)		(penalty scored) Jukić; (penalty scored) Urozov; (penalty scored) Hodža; (penalty scored) Jočić

2 September 2026 Matchday 3	Spartak Moscow	3–1	Rodina Moscow	Moscow
20:45	Zobnin 36'; Solari 65', 80'	Report	Timoshenko 31' (pen.)	Stadium: Lukoil Arena; Attendance: 19,155; Referee: Mikhail Plisko

15 October 2026 Matchday 4	Rubin Kazan	1–4	Orenburg	Kazan
18:30	Babayev 90+3'	Report	Teslenko 6' (o.g.); Golybin 10'; Khotulyov 69'; Kasadzhikov 77'	Stadium: Ak Bars Arena; Attendance: 5,070; Referee: Vladimir Moskalyov

15 October 2026 Matchday 4	Rodina Moscow	2–4	Spartak Moscow	Khimki
20:45	Abdusalamov 40'; Onugkha 41'	Report	Marquinhos 25'; Daku 49', 64'; Ugalde 90+8' (pen.)	Stadium: Arena Khimki; Attendance: 7,351; Referee: Danil Kashirin

28 October 2026 Matchday 5	Orenburg	2–1	Rodina Moscow	Orenburg
16:00 (18:00 YEKT)	Puebla 75'; Golybin 77'	Report	Timoshenko 58'	Stadium: Gazovik Stadium; Attendance: 2,321; Referee: Pavel Shadykhanov

28 October 2026 Matchday 5	Spartak Moscow	1–0	Rubin Kazan	Moscow
20:30	Dmitriyev 7'	Report		Stadium: Lukoil Arena; Attendance: 12,862; Referee: Danil Naboka

25 November 2026 Matchday 6	Rubin Kazan	–	Rodina Moscow
20:30

26 November 2026 Matchday 6	Orenburg	–	Spartak Moscow
17:00 (19:00 YEKT)

=== Group B ===
Pos	Team	Pld	W	PW	PL	L	GF	GA	GD	Pts	Qualification	KRA	DMO	FAK	AKH
1	Krasnodar (Q)	5	2	2	0	1	5	5	0	10	Qualification to the Knockout phase (RPL path)	—	2–1	0–2	1–1 (Note: Krasnodar won 5–4 on penalties.)
2	Dynamo Moscow (T)	5	3	0	0	2	7	4	+3	9	Qualification to the Knockout phase (RPL path)	0–1	—		3–0
3	Fakel Voronezh	5	1	1	1	2	4	4	0	6	Qualification to the Knockout phase (regions path)	1–1 (Note: Krasnodar won 4–3 on penalties.)	0–1	—	0–0 (Note: Fakel won 3–1 on penalties.)
4	Akhmat Grozny	5	1	0	2	2	4	7	−3	5			1–2	2–1	—

Updated to match(es) played on 27 October 2026. Source: Russian Football Union (in Russian)
Rules for classification: 1) Points; 2) Head-to-head points; 3) Head-to-head matches won; 4) Head-to-head goal difference; 5) Head-to-head goals scored; 6) Matches won; 7) Goal difference; 8) Goals scored; 9) Penalty shoot-out goal difference; 10) Draw.
(Q) Qualified to the phase indicated; (T) Qualified, but not yet to the particular phase indicated
Notes:

5 August 2026 Matchday 1	Fakel Voronezh	0–1	Dynamo Moscow	Voronezh
18:30		Report	Yurganov 90+2' (o.g.)	Stadium: Fakel Stadium; Attendance: 7,906; Referee: Mikhail Plisko

5 August 2026 Matchday 1	Krasnodar	1–1 (5–4 p)	Akhmat Grozny	Krasnodar
20:45	Utkin 66'	Report	Samorodov 90+3'	Stadium: Ozon Arena; Attendance: 20,017; Referee: Pavel Shadykhanov
	Penalties
	Krivtsov (penalty missed); Paltsev (penalty scored); Costa (penalty scored); Vorobyov (penalty scored); Douglas Augusto (penalty scored); Chernikov (penalty missed); Batxi (penalty scored)		(penalty scored) Melkadze; (penalty scored) Ndong; (penalty scored) Cacintura; (penalty missed) Samorodov; (penalty scored) Cake; (penalty missed) Silva; (penalty missed) Romão

18 August 2026 Matchday 2	Akhmat Grozny	2–1	Fakel Voronezh	Grozny
20:45	Melkadze 1'; Cacintura 31'	Report	Alshin 90+5'	Stadium: Akhmat-Arena; Attendance: 4,318; Referee: Sergey Tsyganok

19 August 2026 Matchday 2	Dynamo Moscow	0–1	Krasnodar	Moscow
20:45		Report	Mukailov 44'	Stadium: VTB Arena; Attendance: 23,332; Referee: Nikita Novikov

1 September 2026 Matchday 3	Fakel Voronezh	1–1 (3–4 p)	Krasnodar	Voronezh
18:30	Kavalyow 59'	Report	Ozdoyev 61'	Stadium: Fakel Stadium; Attendance: 7,172; Referee: Igor Kaplenkov
	Penalties
	Bardachyov (penalty scored); Gnapi (penalty scored); Giorgobiani (penalty missed); Magomedov (penalty missed); Todorović (penalty scored)		(penalty scored) Paltsev; (penalty missed) Costa; (penalty scored) Vorobyov; (penalty scored) Pina; (penalty scored) Ozdoyev

3 September 2026 Matchday 3	Dynamo Moscow	3–0	Akhmat Grozny	Moscow
19:30	Sergeyev 43'; Gladyshev 54'; Tyukavin 80'	Report		Stadium: VTB Arena; Attendance: 14,727; Referee: Sergey Cheban

13 October 2026 Matchday 4	Krasnodar	0–2	Fakel Voronezh	Krasnodar
20:45		Report	Bagamayev 69'; Turishchev 81'	Stadium: Ozon Arena; Attendance: 11,389; Referee: Matvey Zaika

14 October 2026 Matchday 4	Akhmat Grozny	1–2	Dynamo Moscow	Grozny
18:30	Cacintura 90+2'	Report	Okishor 45'; Gladyshev 90+4'	Stadium: Akhmat-Arena; Attendance: 4,177; Referee: Yevgeny Kukulyak

27 October 2026 Matchday 5	Fakel Voronezh	0–0 (3–1 p)	Akhmat Grozny	Voronezh
18:00		Report		Stadium: Fakel Stadium; Attendance: 3,015; Referee: Yan Bobrovsky
	Penalties
	Bagamayev (penalty scored); Netfullin (penalty scored); Turishchev (penalty scored)		(penalty scored) Sadulayev; (penalty missed) Cacintura; (penalty missed) Cake; (penalty missed) Sidibé

27 October 2026 Matchday 5	Krasnodar	2–1	Dynamo Moscow	Krasnodar
20:30	Vorobyov 13', 43'	Report	Tyukavin 90+4'	Stadium: Ozon Arena; Attendance: 23,595; Referee: Stanislav Matveyev

25 November 2026 Matchday 6	Akhmat Grozny	–	Krasnodar
18:00

26 November 2026 Matchday 6	Dynamo Moscow	–	Fakel Voronezh
19:30

=== Group C ===
Pos	Team	Pld	W	PW	PL	L	GF	GA	GD	Pts	Qualification	ZEN	KRY	BAL	DMA
1	Zenit Saint Petersburg (Q)	5	4	1	0	0	9	3	+6	14	Qualification to the Knockout phase (RPL path)	—		1–0	3–0
2	Krylia Sovetov Samara (T)	5	2	1	1	1	4	3	+1	9	Qualification to the Knockout phase (RPL path)	0–0 (Note: Zenit won 5–3 on penalties.)	—	0–2	2–0
3	Baltika Kaliningrad (T)	5	1	1	1	2	5	5	0	6	Qualification to the Knockout phase (regions path)	2–3	0–0 (Note: Krylia Sovetov won 5–3 on penalties.)	—	1–1 (Note: Baltika won 5–4 on penalties.)
4	Dynamo Makhachkala (E)	5	0	0	1	4	3	10	−7	1		1–2	1–2		—

Updated to match(es) played on 29 October 2026. Source: Russian Football Union (in Russian)
Rules for classification: 1) Points; 2) Head-to-head points; 3) Head-to-head matches won; 4) Head-to-head goal difference; 5) Head-to-head goals scored; 6) Matches won; 7) Goal difference; 8) Goals scored; 9) Penalty shoot-out goal difference; 10) Draw.
(E) Eliminated; (Q) Qualified to the phase indicated; (T) Qualified, but not yet to the particular phase indicated
Notes:

4 August 2026 Matchday 1	Dynamo Makhachkala	1–2	Krylia Sovetov Samara	Kaspiysk
18:30	Khubulov 47' (pen.)	Report	Makarov 15'; Chinedu 63'	Stadium: Anzhi-Arena; Attendance: 5,455; Referee: Sergey Cheban

5 August 2026 Matchday 1	Zenit Saint Petersburg	1–0	Baltika Kaliningrad	Saint Petersburg
20:45	Andrade 3'	Report		Stadium: Gazprom Arena; Attendance: 30,277; Referee: Nikita Novikov

19 August 2026 Matchday 2	Krylia Sovetov Samara	0–0 (3–5 p)	Zenit Saint Petersburg	Samara
16:15 (17:15 SAMT)		Report		Stadium: Solidarnost Samara Arena; Attendance: 13,087; Referee: Danil Naboka
	Penalties
	Banjac (penalty scored); Pyachenin (penalty scored); Oleynikov (penalty missed); Rahmanović (penalty scored)		(penalty scored) Mantuan; (penalty scored) Andrade; (penalty scored) Luiz Henrique; (penalty scored) Jhon Jhon; (penalty scored) Felipe Augusto

20 August 2026 Matchday 2	Baltika Kaliningrad	1–1 (5–4 p)	Dynamo Makhachkala	Kaliningrad
20:45 (19:45 KALT)	Pospelov 47'	Report	Varatynov 18' (o.g.)	Stadium: Rostec Arena; Attendance: 13,856; Referee: Danil Kashirin
	Penalties
	Kovač (penalty scored); Anderson (penalty scored); Nikitin (penalty scored); Yenne (penalty scored); Ćivić (penalty scored)		(penalty missed) Serderov; (penalty scored) Agalarov; (penalty scored) Mrezigue; (penalty scored) Mastouri; (penalty scored) Zinovich

2 September 2026 Matchday 3	Zenit Saint Petersburg	3–0	Dynamo Makhachkala	Saint Petersburg
18:30	Sobolev 11', 38'; Yerokhin 85'	Report		Stadium: Gazprom Arena; Attendance: 20,397; Referee: Matvey Zaika

2 September 2026 Matchday 3	Baltika Kaliningrad	0–0 (3–5 p)	Krylia Sovetov Samara	Kaliningrad
20:45 (19:45 KALT)		Report		Stadium: Rostec Arena; Attendance: 12,457; Referee: Vladimir Moskalyov
	Penalties
	Beveyev (penalty scored); Ryadno (penalty scored); Shiltsov (penalty scored); Petrov (penalty missed)		(penalty scored) Lepsky; (penalty scored) Mukailov; (penalty scored) Galdames; (penalty scored) Stolbov; (penalty scored) Chinedu

14 October 2026 Matchday 4	Krylia Sovetov Samara	0–2	Baltika Kaliningrad	Samara
16:15 (17:15 SAMT)		Report	Golenkov 10'; Kirsh 77'	Stadium: Solidarnost Samara Arena; Attendance: 3,998; Referee: Yan Bobrovsky

14 October 2026 Matchday 4	Dynamo Makhachkala	1–2	Zenit Saint Petersburg	Kaspiysk
18:30	Agalarov 5' (pen.)	Report	Andrade 25'; Musayev 65'	Stadium: Anzhi Arena; Attendance: 3,500; Referee: Sergey Cheban

29 October 2026 Matchday 5	Krylia Sovetov Samara	2–0	Dynamo Makhachkala	Samara
17:00 (18:00 SAMT)	Rahmanović 32'; Banjac 68'	Report		Stadium: Solidarnost Samara Arena; Attendance: 3,529; Referee: Danil Kashirin

29 October 2026 Matchday 5	Baltika Kaliningrad	2–3	Zenit Saint Petersburg	Kaliningrad
21:45 (20:45 KALT)	Kirsh 73'; Porokhov 90+1'	Report	Kondakov 30'; Augusto 69', 83'	Stadium: Rostec Arena; Attendance: 10,642; Referee: Mikhail Plisko

24 November 2026 Matchday 6	Zenit Saint Petersburg	–	Krylia Sovetov Samara
19:30

25 November 2026 Matchday 6	Dynamo Makhachkala	–	Baltika Kaliningrad
18:00

=== Group D ===
Pos	Team	Pld	W	PW	PL	L	GF	GA	GD	Pts	Qualification	ROS	CSK	AKR	LOK
1	Rostov (Q)	5	4	0	0	1	13	5	+8	12	Qualification to the Knockout phase (RPL path)	—	2–0	6–1	1–0
2	CSKA Moscow (T)	5	2	1	0	2	8	5	+3	8	Qualification to the Knockout phase (RPL path)	4–0	—	0–1	3–1
3	Akron Tolyatti (T)	5	1	2	0	2	3	11	−8	7	Qualification to the Knockout phase (regions path)	0–4		—	0–0 (Note: Akron won 5–4 on penalties.)
4	Lokomotiv Moscow (E)	5	0	0	3	2	3	6	−3	3			1–1 (Note: CSKA won 5–4 on penalties.)	1–1 (Note: Akron won 3–1 on penalties.)	—

Updated to match(es) played on 29 October 2026. Source: Russian Football Union (in Russian)
Rules for classification: 1) Points; 2) Head-to-head points; 3) Head-to-head matches won; 4) Head-to-head goal difference; 5) Head-to-head goals scored; 6) Matches won; 7) Goal difference; 8) Goals scored; 9) Penalty shoot-out goal difference; 10) Draw.
(E) Eliminated; (Q) Qualified to the phase indicated; (T) Qualified, but not yet to the particular phase indicated
Notes:

4 August 2026 Matchday 1	Akron Tolyatti	0–4	Rostov	Samara
16:15 (17:15 SAMT)		Report	Olusegun 4'; Mikhaylov 7'; Aznaurov 50'; Prokhin 65'	Stadium: Solidarnost Samara Arena; Attendance: 1,433; Referee: Danil Kashirin

4 August 2026 Matchday 1	Lokomotiv Moscow	1–1 (4–5 p)	CSKA Moscow	Moscow
20:45	Silyanov 90+2'	Report	Reis 40'	Stadium: RZD Arena; Attendance: 19,982; Referee: Andrey Prokopov
	Penalties
	Morozov (penalty scored); Bakayev (penalty scored); Golubev (penalty scored); Batrakov (penalty scored); Silyanov (penalty missed)		(penalty scored) Oblyakov; (penalty scored) Krugovoy; (penalty scored) Kozlov; (penalty scored) Popović; (penalty scored) Musayev

18 August 2026 Matchday 2	CSKA Moscow	0–1	Akron Tolyatti	Moscow
18:30		Report	Arévalo 9' (red card) 57'	Stadium: VEB Arena; Attendance: 15,094; Referee: Mikhail Plisko

18 August 2026 Matchday 2	Rostov	1–0	Lokomotiv Moscow	Rostov-on-Don
20:45	Komarov 90+4' (pen.)	Report		Stadium: Rostov Arena; Attendance: 8,393; Referee: Evgeniy Kukulyak

1 September 2026 Matchday 3	Akron Tolyatti	0–0 (5–4 p)	Lokomotiv Moscow	Samara
16:15 (17:15 SAMT)		Report		Stadium: Solidarnost Samara Arena; Attendance: 1,348; Referee: Pavel Kukuyan
	Penalties
	Khosonov (penalty scored); Maradishvili (penalty missed); Dudu (penalty scored); Hovhannisyan (penalty scored); Bardybakhin (penalty missed); Dmitriyev (penalty scored); Makeev (penalty scored)		(penalty scored) Montes; (penalty scored) Pinyayev; (penalty missed) Golubev; (penalty scored) Saltykov; (penalty missed) Morozov; (penalty scored) Babkin; (penalty missed) Chevardin

1 September 2026 Matchday 3	Rostov	2–0	CSKA Moscow	Rostov-on-Don
20:45	Aznaurov 75'; Prokhin 85'	Report		Stadium: Rostov Arena; Attendance: 11,913; Referee: Rafael Shafeev

13 October 2026 Matchday 4	Lokomotiv Moscow	1–1 (1–3 p)	Akron Tolyatti	Moscow
18:30	Pinyayev 48'	Report	Shumansky 61'	Stadium: RZD Arena; Attendance: 4,590; Referee: Sergey Tsyganok
	Penalties
	Pinyayev (penalty scored); Nyamsi (penalty missed); Titkov (penalty missed); Babkin (penalty missed)		(penalty scored) Khosonov; (penalty missed) Tedić; (penalty scored) Vidosavljević; (penalty scored) Pestryakov

14 October 2026 Matchday 4	CSKA Moscow	4–0	Rostov	Moscow
20:45	Azzi 2'; Carmo 4'; Oblyakov 11' (pen.); Firov 51'	Report		Stadium: VEB Arena; Attendance: 6,806; Referee: Mikhail Plisko

28 October 2026 Matchday 5	Rostov	6–1	Akron Tolyatti	Rostov-on-Don
18:15	Ronaldo 6'; Shantaly 16'; Semenchuk 22'; Komarov 46'; Prokhin 48'; Olusegun 90+1'	Report	Dmitriyev 53'	Stadium: Rostov Arena; Attendance: 5,074; Referee: Sergey Cheban

29 October 2026 Matchday 5	CSKA Moscow	3–1	Lokomotiv Moscow	Moscow
19:30	Kozlov 7'; João Victor 17'; Dzhikiya 66' (o.g.)	Report	Kovalenko 38'	Stadium: VEB Arena; Attendance: 12,197; Referee: Inal Tanashev

24 November 2026 Matchday 6	Akron Tolyatti	–	CSKA Moscow
17:00 (18:00 SAMT)

25 November 2026 Matchday 6	Lokomotiv Moscow	–	Rostov
20:30

== Eighth-finals ==
Unlike previous seasons, this time, the play-off will begin from Eighth-finals (or Last 16 stage). Also, the 1st place in group from RPL Path, will played 1st match away, and 2nd leg at home.

=== RPL Path ===
Team 1	Agg.	Team 2	1st leg	2nd leg
2A	–	1D	–	–
2C	–	1B	–	–
2D	–	1A	–	–
2B	–	Zenit	–	–

2–4 March 2027	2A	–	1D
:

16–18 March 2027	1D	–	2A
:

2–4 March 2027	2C	–	1B
:

16–18 March 2027	1B	–	2C
:

2–4 March 2027	2D	–	1A
:

16–18 March 2027	1A	–	2D
:

2–4 March 2027	2B	–	1C
:

16–18 March 2027	1C	–	2B
:

== Quarter-finals ==
=== RPL Path ===
Team 1	Agg.	Team 2	1st leg	2nd leg
2A/1D	–	2C/1B	–	–
2D/1A	–	2B/1C	–	–

6–8 April 2027	2A/1D	–	2C/1B
:

20–22 April 2027	2C/1B	–	2A/1D
:

6–8 April 2027	2D/1A	–	2B/1C
:

20–22 April 2027	1C/2B	–	1A/2D
:

== Semi-finals ==
=== RPL Path ===
Team 1	Agg.	Team 2	1st leg	2nd leg
QF 1 winner	–	QF 2 winner	–	–

4–6 May 2027	QF 1 winner	–	QF 2 winner
:

18–20 May 2027	QF 2 winner	–	QF 1 winner
:

== Final ==
6 June 2027	RPL path winner	–	Regions Path winner
:
