= Ivan Korshunov =

Russian footballer (born 2002)

Personal information
- Full name: Ivan Konstantinovich Korshunov
- Date of birth: 7 March 2002 (age 24)
- Place of birth: Saint Petersburg, Russia
- Height: 1.73 m (5 ft 8 in)
- Position: Left winger

Team information
- Current team: 2DROTS Moscow
- Number: 68

Youth career
- –2019: FC Zenit Saint Petersburg

Senior career*
Years	Team	Apps	(Gls)
2019–2022	FC Zenit Saint Petersburg	0	(0)
2021	→ FC Irtysh Omsk (loan)	14	(1)
2022	FC Zenit-2 Saint Petersburg	2	(0)
2022	FC SKA-Khabarovsk	1	(0)
2022	FC SKA-Khabarovsk-2	17	(0)
2023–2024	FC Dynamo Saint Petersburg	15	(0)
2022–	2DROTS Moscow	6	(2)

International career^{‡}
2017	Russia U16	4	(0)
- * Club domestic league appearances and goals as of 12 November 2023 ‡ National team caps and goals as of 29 November 2017

Ivan Konstantinovich Korshunov (Russian: Иван Константинович Коршунов; born 7 March 2002) is a Russian football player who plays for 2DROTS.

== Club career ==
Pupil of the FC Zenith Academy from his native St. Petersburg. He played for FC Zenit Saint Petersburg youth and youth teams. In February 2021 he was loaned to the Russian Football National League FC Irtysh Omsk.

He made his debut in the Russian Football National League for FC Irtysh Omsk on 27 February 2021 in a game against FC Neftekhimik Nizhnekamsk.

In parallel with being under contract at FC Zenit Saint Petersburg, he played in the Media League for 2DROTS, which was not welcomed by the Zenit leadership. In the summer of 2022, he decided not to renew his contract with the St. Petersburg club and moved to FC SKA-Khabarovsk, signing an agreement under the 2+2 year scheme.
