= Vladimir Ignatenko =

Vladimir Ignatenko may refer to:

- Vladimir Ignatenko (footballer) (born 2006), Russian footballer
- Vladimir Ignatenko (sailor), Soviet competitor at the 1980 Olympics
- Vladimir Ignatenko (sprinter) (born 1955), Soviet-Ukrainian runner
