= Nikita Morozov =

Russian footballer (born 2006)

Personal information
- Full name: Nikita Andreyevich Morozov
- Date of birth: 3 February 2006 (age 20)
- Place of birth: Gatchina, Leningrad Oblast, Russia
- Height: 1.80 m (5 ft 11 in)
- Position: Midfielder

Team information
- Current team: Ural Yekaterinburg
- Number: 18

Youth career
- 2012–2016: Gatchina
- 2017: Izhorets Kolpino
- 2018–2021: Almaz-Antey Saint Petersburg
- 2022: Leningradets Leningrad Oblast

Senior career*
Years	Team	Apps	(Gls)
2023–2024	Leningradets Leningrad Oblast	9	(1)
2024–	Ural Yekaterinburg	32	(6)
2025	→ Ural-2 Yekaterinburg	5	(0)

International career^{‡}
2025–	Russia U-20	1	(0)
- * Club domestic league appearances and goals as of 1 November 2026 ‡ National team caps and goals as of 7 June 2025

Nikita Andreyevich Morozov (Russian: Никита Андреевич Морозов; born 3 February 2006) is a Russian footballer who plays as a midfielder for Ural Yekaterinburg.

== Club career ==
Morozov made his debut in the Russian Second League for Leningradets Leningrad Oblast on 8 April 2023 in a game against Dynamo Vologda.

He made his Russian First League debut for Leningradets Leningrad Oblast on 12 May 2024 in a game against Khimki.
