= Danila Yezhkov =

Russian footballer

Personal information
- Full name: Danila Andreyevich Yezhkov
- Date of birth: 7 August 2001 (age 25)
- Height: 1.84 m (6 ft 0 in)
- Position: Forward

Team information
- Current team: Dynamo St. Petersburg
- Number: 10

Youth career
- 2020: Syzran-2003
- 2020: Rubin Kazan
- 2020–2021: Konoplyov football academy

Senior career*
Years	Team	Apps	(Gls)
2021	Ural-2 Yekaterinburg	13	(6)
2021–2023	Veles Moscow	35	(2)
2023–2024	Sokol Saratov	30	(8)
2024–2025	Kuban Krasnodar	24	(1)
2025	Amkal Moscow (amateur)		
2026	Dynamo Vologda	13	(7)
2026–	Dynamo St. Petersburg	13	(6)
- * Club domestic league appearances and goals as of 1 November 2026

Danila Andreyevich Yezhkov (Russian: Данила Андреевич Ежков; born 7 August 2001) is a Russian football player who plays for Dynamo St. Petersburg.

== Club career ==
He made his debut in the Russian Football National League for Veles Moscow on 29 August 2021 in a game against Akron Tolyatti.
