= Mikhail Chernomyrdin =

Russian footballer

Personal information
- Full name: Mikhail Viktorovich Chernomyrdin
- Date of birth: 4 March 1999 (age 27)
- Place of birth: Volgograd, Russia
- Height: 1.75 m (5 ft 9 in)
- Position: Midfielder

Team information
- Current team: 2DROTS Moscow

Youth career
- –2014: Olimpia Volgograd
- 2014–2016: Strogino Moscow

Senior career*
Years	Team	Apps	(Gls)
2016–2019	Strogino Moscow	65	(10)
2019–2021	Zenit St. Petersburg	0	(0)
2019–2021	→ Zenit-2 St. Petersburg	37	(1)
2021–2022	Olimp-Dolgoprudny	11	(0)
2022–2023	Zenit-2 St. Petersburg	36	(13)
2023–2024	Caspiy	11	(1)
2024	Dynamo St. Petersburg	28	(5)
2025–	2DROTS Moscow	0	(0)
- * Club domestic league appearances and goals as of 3 November 2024

Mikhail Viktorovich Chernomyrdin (Russian: Михаил Викторович Черномырдин; born 4 March 1999) is a Russian football player who plays for 2DROTS Moscow. He was previously known as Mikhail Pogorelov (Russian: Михаил Погорелов) and changed his last name in the winter of 2022.

== Club career ==
He was called up to the main squad of Zenit St. Petersburg once in February 2021, for a Russian Cup game against Arsenal Tula, but remained on the bench.

He made his debut in the Russian Football National League for Olimp-Dolgoprudny on 17 July 2021 in a game against Rotor Volgograd.

On 28 January 2022, he returned to Zenit-2 St. Petersburg.
