= Anton Polyutkin =

Russian footballer

Personal information
- Full name: Anton Sergeyevich Polyutkin
- Date of birth: 2 February 1993 (age 33)
- Place of birth: Naberezhnye Chelny, Russia
- Height: 1.91 m (6 ft 3 in)
- Position: Centre back

Team information
- Current team: 2DROTS Moscow

Senior career*
Years	Team	Apps	(Gls)
2011–2014	CSKA Moscow	0	(0)
2013–2014	→ Yenisey Krasnoyarsk (loan)	1	(0)
2014–2016	Solyaris Moscow	50	(1)
2016	Montana	7	(0)
2017	Academia Chișinău	9	(1)
2017–2019	Sibir Novosibirsk	47	(1)
2019–2022	Tyumen	40	(6)
2022–2024	KAMAZ Naberezhnye Chelny	34	(2)
2026	Izhevsk	12	(1)
2026–	2DROTS Moscow		

International career
2009	Russia U-16	6	(0)
2010	Russia U-17	3	(0)
- * Club domestic league appearances and goals as of 9 July 2026

Anton Sergeyevich Polyutkin (Russian: Антон Сергеевич Полюткин; born 2 February 1993) is a Russian football defender who plays for 2DROTS Moscow.

== Career ==
Polyutkin made his debut in the Russian Football National League for Yenisey Krasnoyarsk on 27 October 2013 in a game against Arsenal Tula. In March 2017, he joined Moldovan club Academia Chișinău; he made his debut against Saxan on 17 March.
