= Daniil Gorovykh =

Russian footballer

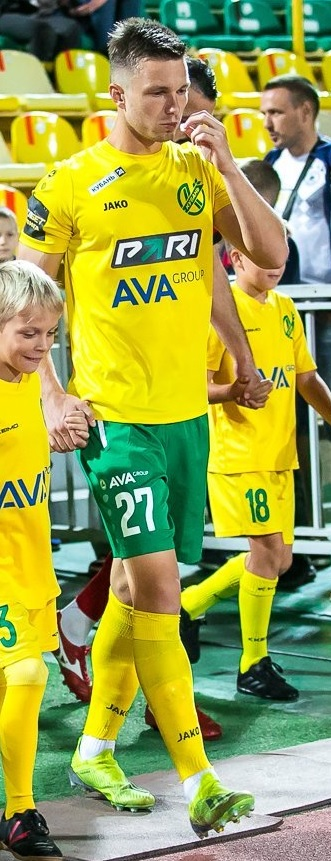
- Gorovykh with Kuban Krasnodar in 2022

Personal information
- Full name: Daniil Igorevich Gorovykh
- Date of birth: 3 January 1997 (age 29)
- Place of birth: Krasnodar, Russia
- Height: 1.86 m (6 ft 1 in)
- Position: Defensive midfielder

Youth career
- –2012: FC Krasnodar
- 2012–2017: FC Spartak Moscow

Senior career*
Years	Team	Apps	(Gls)
2017	FC Veles Moscow	5	(0)
2018	FC Olimp Khimki (amateur)		
2018–2019	FC Leningradets Leningrad Oblast	7	(0)
2019	FC SKA Rostov-on-Don	9	(0)
2019–2021	FC Saturn Ramenskoye	24	(1)
2021	FC Volgar Astrakhan	12	(0)
2022	FC Tom Tomsk	13	(1)
2022–2023	FC Kuban Krasnodar	15	(1)
2023–2024	FC Tekstilshchik Ivanovo	40	(3)
2024–2025	FC Volgar Astrakhan	22	(1)
2026	FC Torpedo Miass	17	(3)
- * Club domestic league appearances and goals as of 13 June 2026

Daniil Igorevich Gorovykh (Russian: Даниил Игоревич Горовых; born 3 January 1997) is a Russian football player.

== Club career ==
He made his debut in the Russian Football National League for FC Volgar Astrakhan on 8 May 2021 in a game against FC Akron Tolyatti.
