= Mikhail Gorelishvili =

Russian footballer

Personal information
- Full name: Mikhail Merabiyevich Gorelishvili
- Date of birth: 29 May 1993 (age 33)
- Place of birth: Nizhny Novgorod, Russia
- Height: 1.74 m (5 ft 9 in)
- Position: Midfielder

Team information
- Current team: SKA-Khabarovsk
- Number: 24

Youth career
- Konoplyov football academy
- 2009–2010: Chertanovo Education Center

Senior career*
| Years | Team | Apps | (Gls) |
| 2010 | Chertanovo Moscow | 19 | (3) |
| 2011–2012 | Rubin Kazan | 0 | (0) |
| 2012–2014 | Dila Gori | 34 | (4) |
| 2014 | Tosno | 25 | (3) |
| 2015 | Dila Gori | 12 | (5) |
| 2016 | Mika | 9 | (3) |
| 2016 | Olimpiyets Nizhny Novgorod | 2 | (0) |
| 2016–2017 | Dinamo Batumi | 9 | (1) |
| 2018 | Rustavi | 2 | (0) |
| 2018–2019 | Samtredia | 11 | (0) |
| 2019 | Lokomotiv-NN (amateur) | | |
| 2019 | Volna Kovernino (amateur) | | |
| 2020 | Lada Dimitrovgrad | 0 | (0) |
| 2020–2021 | Volga Ulyanovsk | 24 | (2) |
| 2021–2022 | Amkar Perm | 27 | (5) |
| 2022–2026 | Leningradets | 105 | (8) |
| 2026– | SKA-Khabarovsk | 0 | (0) |

International career
| 2011 | Russia U19 | 3 | (0) |
- * Club domestic league appearances and goals as of 13 June 2026

Mikhail Merabiyevich Gorelishvili (Russian: Михаил Мерабиевич Горелишвили; Georgian: მიხეილ გორელიშვილი; born 29 May 1993) is a Russian football player of Georgian ethnic origin who plays for SKA-Khabarovsk.

== Club career ==
He made his Russian Professional Football League debut for FC Tosno on 19 April 2014 in a game against FC Sever Murmansk. He made his Russian Football National League debut for Tosno on 6 July 2014 in a game against FC Gazovik Orenburg.
