= Konstantin Korzh =

Russian footballer

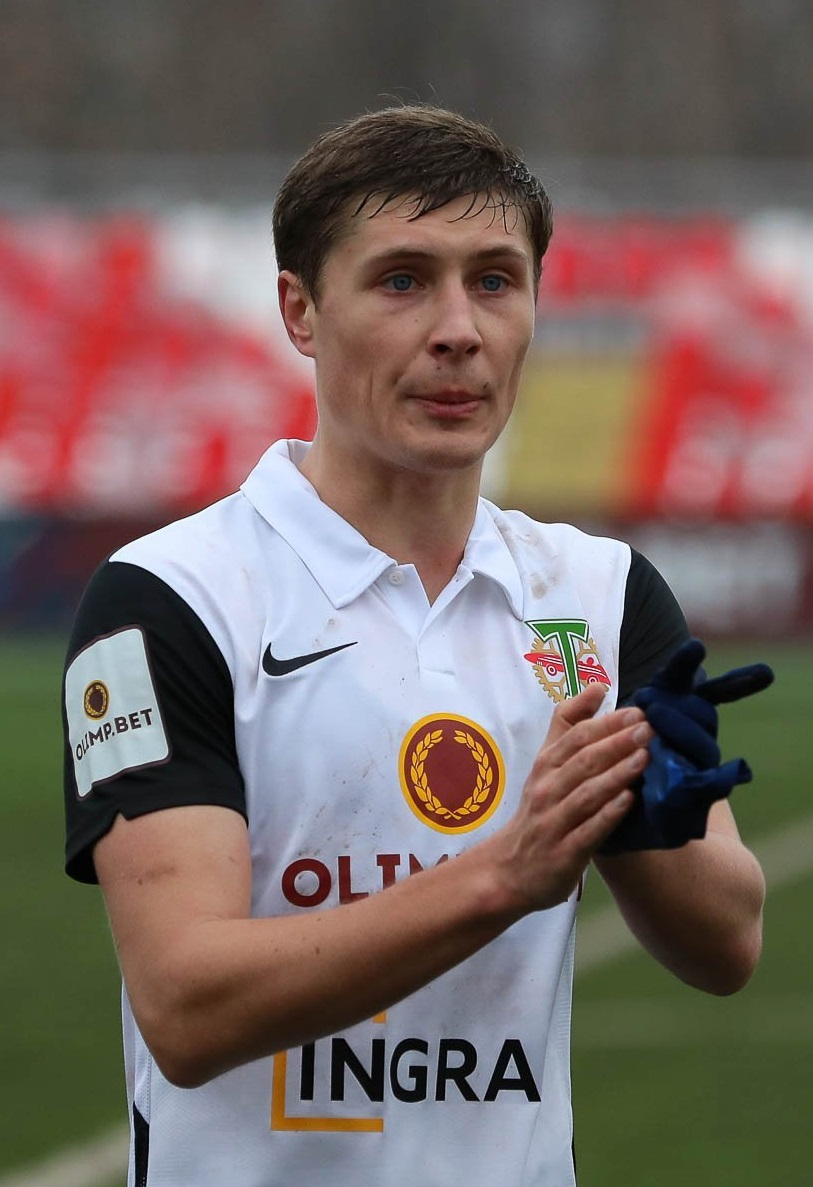
- Korzh with Torpedo Moscow in 2021

Personal information
- Full name: Konstantin Mikhaylovich Korzh
- Date of birth: 17 June 1996 (age 30)
- Place of birth: Druzhba, Moscow Oblast, Russia
- Height: 1.83 m (6 ft 0 in)
- Position: Forward

Team information
- Current team: FC Titan Moscow (amateur)

Youth career
- 2002–2007: FC Saturn Ramenskoye
- 2008: Master-Saturn
- 2009–2012: FC Saturn Ramenskoye

Senior career*
Years	Team	Apps	(Gls)
2013–2014	FC Saturn Ramenskoye (amateur)		
2014–2015	FC Saturn Ramenskoye	1	(0)
2015	→ FC Znamya Truda Orekhovo-Zuyevo (loan)	0	(0)
2015	FC Donenergo Aksay (amateur)		
2016	FC Saturn-M Moscow Region (amateur)		
2016–2020	FC Saturn Ramenskoye	85	(22)
2021–2022	FC Torpedo Moscow	7	(0)
2021–2022	→ FC Tom Tomsk (loan)	32	(4)
2022	FC Chayka Peschanokopskoye	15	(4)
2023	FC Dynamo Stavropol	6	(0)
2023	FC Broke Boys Moscow (amateur)		
2024–	FC Titan Moscow (amateur)		
- * Club domestic league appearances and goals as of 15 April 2023

Konstantin Mikhaylovich Korzh (Russian: Константин Михайлович Корж; born 17 June 1996) is a Russian football player.

== Club career ==
He made his debut in the Russian Professional Football League for FC Saturn Ramenskoye on 8 August 2014 in a game against FC Domodedovo Moscow. He made his debut in the Russian Football National League for FC Torpedo Moscow on 27 February 2021 in a game against FC SKA-Khabarovsk.
