= Maksim Bachinsky =

Russian footballer

Personal information
- Full name: Maksim Pavlovich Bachinsky
- Date of birth: 2 February 2000 (age 26)
- Place of birth: Baltiysk, Russia
- Height: 1.85 m (6 ft 1 in)
- Position: Forward

Team information
- Current team: FC Leningradets Leningrad Oblast
- Number: 77

Youth career
- –2019: FC Zenit Saint Petersburg

Senior career*
Years	Team	Apps	(Gls)
2018–2022	FC Zenit-2 Saint Petersburg	13	(0)
2019	FC Zenit Saint Petersburg	0	(0)
2020–2022	→ FC Tekstilshchik Ivanovo (loan)	64	(6)
2022–	FC Leningradets Leningrad Oblast	125	(32)
- * Club domestic league appearances and goals as of 13 June 2026

Maksim Pavlovich Bachinsky (Russian: Максим Павлович Бачинский; born 2 February 2000) is a Russian football player who plays for FC Leningradets Leningrad Oblast.

== Club career ==
He made his debut in the Russian Football National League for FC Zenit-2 Saint Petersburg on 17 July 2018 in a game against FC Tambov.
