= Imran Firov =

Russian footballer (born 2008)

Personal information
- Full name: Imran Beslanovich Firov
- Date of birth: 22 February 2008 (age 18)
- Place of birth: Kakhun, Urvansky District, Russia
- Height: 1.80 m (5 ft 11 in)
- Position: Winger

Team information
- Current team: CSKA Moscow
- Number: 62

Youth career
- CSKA Moscow

Senior career*
Years	Team	Apps	(Gls)
2026–	CSKA Moscow	8	(2)

International career^{‡}
2025	Russia U17	6	(4)
2025–	Russia U18	6	(0)
- * Club domestic league appearances and goals as of 18 October 2026 ‡ National team caps and goals as of 15 November 2025

Imran Beslanovich Firov (Russian: Имран Бесланович Фиров; born 22 February 2008) is a Russian football player who plays as a winger for CSKA Moscow.

== Career ==
Firov was raised in the youth system of CSKA Moscow and made his senior debut on 6 May 2026 in a Russian Cup game against Spartak Moscow.

Firov made his Russian Premier League debut for CSKA 5 days later against Pari Nizhny Novgorod. He came on as a substitute in the 58th minute with CSKA down 0–1. In the 88th minute, Firov assisted on the equalizer by Danila Kozlov, and then scored in the 90th minute to complete a 2–1 comeback victory. Firov became the youngest player to score a goal and make an assist in his RPL debut.

== Career statistics ==
As of 18 October 2026

Club	Season	League			Cup		Total	
Club	Season	Division	Apps	Goals	Apps	Goals	Apps	Goals
CSKA Moscow	2025–26	Russian Premier League	1	1	1	0	2	1
CSKA Moscow	2026–27	Russian Premier League	7	1	2	1	9	2
Career total			8	2	3	1	11	3
