= Eldiyar Zarypbekov =

Kyrgyz footballer

Personal information
- Full name: Eldiyar Tolubekovich Zarypbekov
- Date of birth: 14 September 2001 (age 25)
- Place of birth: Rostov-on-Don, Russia
- Height: 1.86 m (6 ft 1 in)
- Position: Midfielder

Team information
- Current team: Leningradets
- Number: 10

Youth career
- –2021: Chayka Peschanokopskoye

Senior career*
Years	Team	Apps	(Gls)
2021–2025	Chayka Peschanokopskoye	74	(3)
2022	→ Mashuk-KMV Pyatigorsk (loan)	13	(1)
2025–2026	Chernomorets Novorossiysk	29	(0)
2026–	Leningradets	0	(0)

International career^{‡}
2023–	Kyrgyzstan	16	(1)
- * Club domestic league appearances and goals as of 16 May 2026 ‡ National team caps and goals as of 2 September 2025

Eldiyar Tolubekovich Zarypbekov (Kyrgyz: Элдияр Зарыпбеков; Russian: Эльдияр Толубекович Зарыпбеков; born 14 September 2001) is a professional footballer who plays for Russian First League club Leningradets and the Kyrgyzstan national team.

== Club career ==
Zarypbekov came up through the youth program of Chayka Peschanokopskoye. In 2022, he went on loan to Mashuk-KMV Pyatigorsk. He also competes on his university team at Don State Technical University.

== International career ==
A native of Rostov-on-Don, Russia, Zarypbekov represents Kyrgyzstan internationally. He was first contacted by the Kyrgyz Football Union in summer 2022. In September 2023, he represented the country at the youth level with the national under-23 team in 2024 AFC U-23 Asian Cup qualification. The following month, he made his debut for the senior national team in a friendly against Bahrain on 12 October. On 11 June 2024, Zarypbekov scored against group leaders Oman in 2026 FIFA World Cup qualification for his first senior international goal. The eventual 1–1 draw helped Kyrgyzstan advanced to the Third Round of qualification. He was named Kyrgyzstan's Man-of-the-Match for his performance.

=== International goals ===
Scores and results list Kyrgyzstan's goal tally first.

No.	Date	Venue	Opponent	Score	Result	Competition
1.	11 June 2024	Sultan Qaboos Sports Complex, Muscat, Oman	Oman	1–0	1–1	2026 FIFA World Cup qualification
Last updated 12 June 2024

=== International career statistics ===
As of match played 25 March 2025.

Kyrgyzstan national team
Year	Apps	Goals
2023	2	0
2024	10	1
2025	2	0
Total	14	1
