= Anatol Makaraw =

Belarusian professional footballer

Personal information
- Date of birth: 10 April 1996 (age 30)
- Place of birth: Ratamka, Minsk Raion, Belarus
- Height: 1.85 m (6 ft 1 in)
- Position: Central midfielder

Team information
- Current team: Leningradets
- Number: 21

Youth career
- 2013–2017: Torpedo-BelAZ Zhodino

Senior career*
Years	Team	Apps	(Gls)
2015–2018	Torpedo-BelAZ Zhodino	0	(0)
2018	→ Slonim-2017 (loan)	26	(3)
2019–2020	Smolevichi	53	(8)
2021–2023	Torpedo-BelAZ Zhodino	41	(0)
2023–2024	Arsenal Tula	31	(2)
2024–2025	Sochi	15	(0)
2025–2026	Rotor Volgograd	4	(0)
2026–	Leningradets	0	(0)
- * Club domestic league appearances and goals as of 16 May 2026

Anatol Makaraw (Belarusian: Анатоль Макараў; Russian: Анатолий Макаров; born 10 April 1996) is a Belarusian professional footballer who plays as a central midfielder for Russian club Leningradets.

His twin brother Stsyapan Makaraw is also a professional footballer. The brothers played together for Torpedo-BelAZ Zhodino reserves, Slonim-2017 and Smolevichi.

== Career statistics ==
As of 23 May 2026

Club	Season	League			Cup		Continental		Other		Total	
Club	Season	Division	Apps	Goals	Apps	Goals	Apps	Goals	Apps	Goals	Apps	Goals
Torpedo-BelAZ Zhodino	2015	Belarusian Premier League	0	0	0	0	–		–		0	0
Slonim-2017 (loan)	2018	Belarusian First League	26	3	2	0	–		–		28	3
Smolevichi	2019	Belarusian First League	26	5	1	1	–		–		27	6
Smolevichi	2020	Belarusian Premier League	27	3	1	0	–		–		28	3
Smolevichi	Total		53	8	2	1	0	0	0	0	55	9
Torpedo-BelAZ Zhodino	2021	Belarusian Premier League	16	0	5	0	2 (Note: Appearances in UEFA Conference League)	0	–		23	0
Torpedo-BelAZ Zhodino	2022	Belarusian Premier League	25	0	4	0	–		–		29	0
Torpedo-BelAZ Zhodino	2023	Belarusian Premier League	0	0	0	0	–		–		0	0
Torpedo-BelAZ Zhodino	Total		41	0	9	0	2	0	0	0	52	0
Arsenal Tula	2023–24	Russian First League	31	2	0	0	–		2 (Note: Appearances in promotion play-offs)	0	33	2
Sochi	2024–25	Russian First League	15	0	1	0	–		–		16	0
Rotor Volgograd	2025–26	Russian First League	4	0	0	0	–		0	0	4	0
Career total			170	13	14	1	2	0	2	0	188	14
