= Vladislav Shpitalny =

Russian footballer

Personal information
- Full name: Vladislav Vadimovich Shpitalny
- Date of birth: 5 September 1996 (age 30)
- Place of birth: Saratov, Russia
- Height: 1.81 m (5 ft 11 in)
- Position: Midfielder

Team information
- Current team: Sokol Saratov

Youth career
- 2012–2014: Rubin Kazan
- 2014–2015: Amkar Perm

Senior career*
Years	Team	Apps	(Gls)
2016–2018	Sokol Saratov	35	(1)
2018–2019	Paredes	27	(6)
2019–2020	União de Leiria	10	(1)
2020	Yenisey Krasnoyarsk	2	(0)
2020	Belshina Bobruisk	2	(0)
2021	Amkar Perm	14	(1)
2022	Spartak Tuymazy	8	(4)
2022–2024	Torpedo Miass	59	(17)
2024–	Sokol Saratov	67	(9)
- * Club domestic league appearances and goals as of 15 November 2026

Vladislav Vadimovich Shpitalny (Russian: Владислав Вадимович Шпитальный; born 5 September 1996) is a Russian footballer who plays as a midfielder for Sokol Saratov.

== Career ==
Shpitalny made his debut in the Russian Football National League for Sokol Saratov on 15 October 2016 in a game against Yenisey Krasnoyarsk.

== Personal life ==
His father Vadim Shpitalny played in the Russian First Division for Sokol Saratov and Amkar Perm. His grandfather, also called Vadim Shpitalny, played for Sokol Saratov in the Soviet First League and then was the manager of Sokol.
