= Artur Maksetsov =

Russian footballer

Personal information
- Full name: Artur Vladimirovich Maksetsov
- Date of birth: 19 April 2004 (age 22)
- Height: 1.77 m (5 ft 10 in)
- Position: Left-back

Team information
- Current team: Leningradets
- Number: 19

Youth career
- –2021: Zenit Saint Petersburg
- 2021–2024: Rostov

Senior career*
Years	Team	Apps	(Gls)
2023–2026	Rostov	0	(0)
2024–2026	Rostov-2	39	(2)
2025–2026	→ Leningradets (loan)	15	(0)
2026–	Leningradets	0	(0)

International career^{‡}
2021	Russia U-17	1	(0)
2023	Russia U-19	2	(0)
- * Club domestic league appearances and goals as of 13 June 2026 ‡ National team caps and goals as of 28 May 2023

Artur Vladimirovich Maksetsov (Russian: Артур Владимирович Максецов; born 19 April 2004) is a Russian football player who plays as a left-back for Leningradets.

== Career ==
Maksetsov made his debut for Rostov on 26 July 2023 in a Russian Cup game against Rubin Kazan.

== Career statistics ==
As of match played 16 November 2024

Appearances and goals by club, season and competition
Club	Season	League			Cup		Continental		Other		Total	
Club	Season	Division	Apps	Goals	Apps	Goals	Apps	Goals	Apps	Goals	Apps	Goals
Rostov	2023–24	Russian Premier League	0	0	1	0	–		–		1	0
Rostov-2	2024	Russian Second League B	30	2	–		–		–		30	2
Career total			30	2	1	0	0	0	0	0	31	2
