= Sergei Loskutov =

Russian footballer (born 2003)

Personal information
- Full name: Sergei Denisovich Loskutov
- Date of birth: 12 October 2003 (age 23)
- Place of birth: Yekaterinburg, Russia
- Height: 1.71 m (5 ft 7 in)
- Position: Defender

Team information
- Current team: Krasnoye Znamya Noginsk
- Number: 56

Youth career
- –2021: Ural Yekaterinburg

Senior career*
| Years | Team | Apps | (Gls) |
| 2022–2025 | Ural Yekaterinburg | 0 | (0) |
| 2022–2024 | → Ural-2 Yekaterinburg | 38 | (0) |
| 2024–2025 | Volgar Astrakhan (loan) | 16 | (0) |
| 2025 | Gomel | 2 | (0) |
| 2025 | → Gomel-2 | 8 | (0) |
| 2026– | Krasnoye Znamya Noginsk | 0 | (0) |
- * Club domestic league appearances and goals as of 6 April 2026

Sergei Denisovich Loskutov (Russian: Сергей Денисович Лоскутов; born 12 October 2003) is a Russian footballer who plays as a defender.

== Career ==
He made his debut in the Russian Second League for Ural-2 Yekaterinburg on 28 May 2022, in a game against Nosta Novotroitsk.

He made his debut in the Belarusian First League for Gomel-2 on 16 August 2025 in a game against Belshina Bobruisk.

He made his debut in the Belarusian Premier League for Gomel on 29 August 2025 in a game against Minsk.
