= Aleksandr Perchenok =

Russian footballer

Personal information
- Full name: Aleksandr Andreyevich Perchenok
- Date of birth: 28 November 1992 (age 33)
- Place of birth: Saratov, Russia
- Height: 1.80 m (5 ft 11 in)
- Position: Forward

Team information
- Current team: FC Sokol Saratov
- Number: 7

Youth career
- FC Sokol Saratov

Senior career*
Years	Team	Apps	(Gls)
2011–2013	FC Sokol Saratov	23	(3)
2013–2015	FC Dnepr Smolensk	56	(6)
2015–2017	FC Sokol Saratov	50	(2)
2017	FSK Dolgoprudny	8	(0)
2018–2023	FC Sokol Saratov	135	(25)
2023–2026	FC Ufa	67	(3)
2026–	FC Sokol Saratov	16	(0)
- * Club domestic league appearances and goals as of 15 November 2026

Aleksandr Andreyevich Perchenok (Russian: Александр Андреевич Перченок; born 28 November 1992) is a Russian football forward who plays for FC Sokol Saratov.

== Club career ==
He made his debut in the Russian Second Division for FC Sokol Saratov on 29 June 2011 in a game against FC Gubkin.

He made his Russian Football National League debut for Sokol on 3 August 2015 in a game against FC Volga Nizhny Novgorod.
