= Dmitry Nikitin =

Russian footballer (born 2006)

Personal information
- Full name: Dmitry Petrovich Nikitin
- Date of birth: 31 October 2006 (age 20)
- Height: 1.86 m (6 ft 1 in)
- Positions: Centre-forward; central midfielder

Team information
- Current team: Leningradets (on loan from Baltika Kaliningrad)
- Number: 7

Youth career
- –2023: SShOR #5 Kaliningrad
- 2023–2024: Baltika Kaliningrad

Senior career*
Years	Team	Apps	(Gls)
2024–	Baltika-2 Kaliningrad	27	(10)
2025–	Baltika Kaliningrad	3	(0)
2026	→ Sibir Novosibirsk (loan)	18	(5)
2026–	→ Leningradets	0	(0)
- * Club domestic league appearances and goals as of 24 July 2026

Dmitry Petrovich Nikitin (Russian: Дмитрий Петрович Никитин; born 31 October 2006) is a Russian football player who plays as a centre-forward or central midfielder for Leningradets on loan from Baltika Kaliningrad.

== Career ==
Nikitin made his debut in the Russian Premier League for Baltika Kaliningrad on 2 November 2025 in a game against Akhmat Grozny.

On 2 February 2026, he was loaned by Sibir Novosibirsk. On 9 September 2026, Nikitin moved on loan to Leningradets.

== Career statistics ==
As of 20 August 2026

Club	Season	League			Cup		Other		Total	
Club	Season	Division	Apps	Goals	Apps	Goals	Apps	Goals	Apps	Goals
Baltika-2 Kaliningrad	2024	Russian Second League B	11	2	–		–		11	2
Baltika-2 Kaliningrad	2025	Russian Second League B	16	8	–		–		16	8
Baltika-2 Kaliningrad	Total		27	10	0	0	0	0	27	10
Baltika Kaliningrad	2024–25	Russian First League	1	0	–		–		1	0
Baltika Kaliningrad	2025–26	Russian Premier League	1	0	3	0	–		4	0
Baltika Kaliningrad	2026–27	Russian Premier League	1	0	2	0	–		3	0
Baltika Kaliningrad	Total		3	0	5	0	0	0	8	0
Sibir Novosibirsk (loan)	2025–26	Russian Second League A	18	5	–		2 (Note: Appearances in promotion play-offs)	0	20	5
Career total			48	15	5	0	2	0	55	15
