= Ilya Petukhov =

Russian footballer

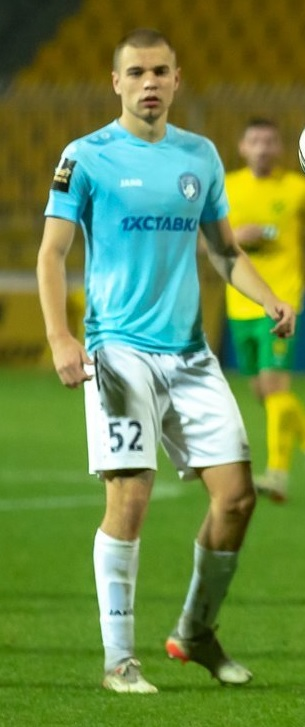
- Petukhov with Rodina Moscow in 2022

Personal information
- Full name: Ilya Nikolayevich Petukhov
- Date of birth: 8 January 2001 (age 25)
- Place of birth: Nizhny Novgorod, Russia
- Height: 1.83 m (6 ft 0 in)
- Position: Midfielder

Team information
- Current team: Leningradets
- Number: 52

Youth career
- –2020: Lokomotiv Moscow

Senior career*
Years	Team	Apps	(Gls)
2019–2021	Kazanka Moscow	36	(0)
2020–2021	Lokomotiv Moscow	0	(0)
2022	Olimp-Dolgoprudny	12	(0)
2022–2023	Rodina Moscow	12	(0)
2022–2024	Rodina-2 Moscow	48	(4)
2024	Tyumen	3	(0)
2025	Amkar Perm	0	(0)
2025	Rodina-M Moscow	9	(0)
2026–	Leningradets	0	(0)

International career^{‡}
2017	Russia U17	1	(0)
2019	Russia U18	4	(2)
- * Club domestic league appearances and goals as of 1 November 2025 ‡ National team caps and goals as of 14 June 2019

Ilya Nikolayevich Petukhov (Russian: Илья Николаевич Петухов; born 8 January 2001) is a Russian football player who plays for Leningradets.

== Club career ==
He made his debut in the Russian Football National League for Olimp-Dolgoprudny on 6 March 2022 in a game against Spartak-2 Moscow.
