= Daniil Chevardin =

Russian footballer (born 2006)

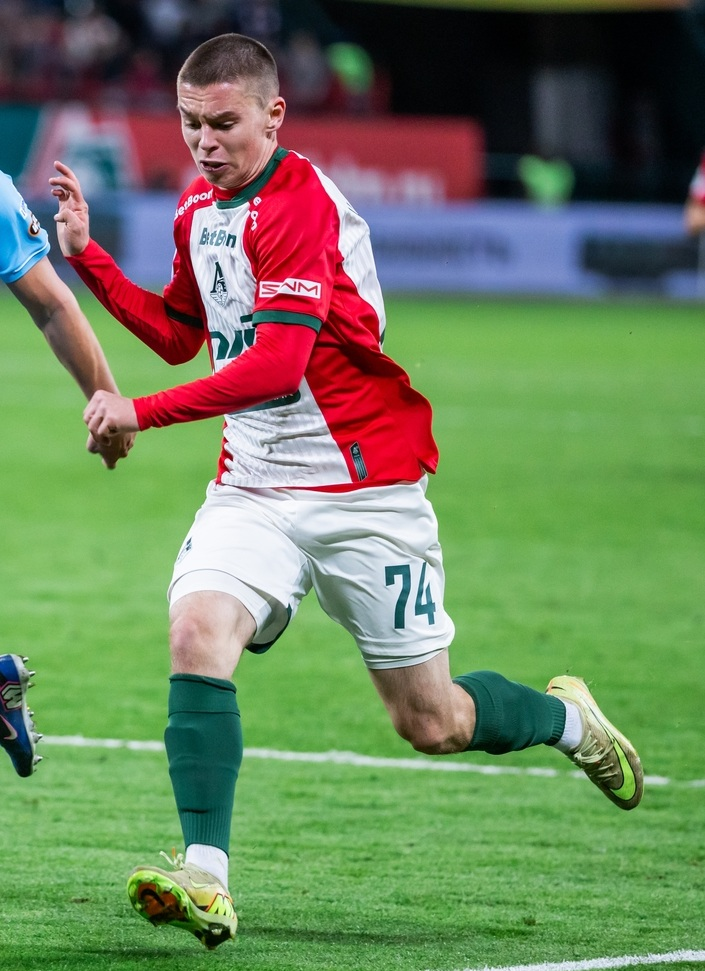
- Chevardin with Lokomotiv in 2026

Personal information
- Full name: Daniil Igorevich Chevardin
- Date of birth: 22 August 2006 (age 20)
- Height: 1.76 m (5 ft 9 in)
- Positions: Centre-back; defensive midfielder

Team information
- Current team: Lokomotiv Moscow
- Number: 74

Youth career
- Lokomotiv Moscow

Senior career*
Years	Team	Apps	(Gls)
2026–	Lokomotiv Moscow	6	(0)
- * Club domestic league appearances and goals as of 16 September 2026

Daniil Igorevich Chevardin (Russian: Даниил Игоревич Чевардин; born 22 August 2006) is a Russian football player who plays as a centre-back or defensive midfielder for Lokomotiv Moscow.

== Career ==
On 6 December 2025, Chevardin signed a professional contract with Lokomotiv Moscow until June 2028.

Chevardin made his debut in the Russian Premier League for Lokomotiv Moscow on 22 March 2026 in a game against Akron Tolyatti.

== Career statistics ==
As of 29 October 2026

Club	Season	League			Cup		Total	
Club	Season	Division	Apps	Goals	Apps	Goals	Apps	Goals
Lokomotiv Moscow	2025–26	Russian Premier League	5	0	0	0	5	0
Lokomotiv Moscow	2026–27	Russian Premier League	1	0	2	0	3	0
Lokomotiv Moscow	Total		6	0	2	0	8	0
Career total			6	0	2	0	8	0
