= Gleb Popolitov =

Russian footballer (born 2007)

Personal information
- Full name: Gleb Vladimirovich Popolitov
- Date of birth: 13 August 2007 (age 19)
- Place of birth: Lipetsk, Russia
- Height: 1.74 m (5 ft 9 in)
- Position: Right winger

Team information
- Current team: Nizhny Novgorod (on loan from CSKA Moscow)
- Number: 11

Youth career
- –2019: SSh-15 Voronezh
- 2019–2021: Krasnodar
- 2021–2024: Stroitel Kamensk-Shakhtinsky

Senior career*
Years	Team	Apps	(Gls)
2023	Stroitel Kamensk-Shakhtinsky (amateur)		
2024	Stroitel Kamensk-Shakhtinsky	20	(2)
2025	Spartak-2 Moscow	13	(5)
2025	Chayka Peschanokopskoye	9	(2)
2025–	CSKA Moscow	2	(0)
2026	→ Chayka Peschanokopskoye (loan)	11	(3)
2026–	→ Nizhny Novgorod (loan)	0	(0)

International career^{‡}
2025–	Russia U19	2	(1)
2026–	Russia U21	4	(1)
- * Club domestic league appearances and goals as of 16 May 2026 ‡ National team caps and goals as of 8 June 2026

Gleb Vladimirovich Popolitov (Russian: Глеб Владимирович Пополитов; born 13 August 2007) is a Russian football player who plays as a right winger for Nizhny Novgorod on loan from CSKA Moscow.

== Career ==
In early 2025, Popolitov played for Spartak-2 Moscow, the reserve team of Spartak Moscow. In June 2025, he appeared for Spartak's senior team in a pre-season friendly.

On 18 July 2025, Popolitov moved to Russian First League club Chayka Peschanokopskoye.

Two months later, Popolitov signed a three-year contract with CSKA Moscow. He made his Russian Premier League debut for CSKA on 28 September 2025 against Baltika Kaliningrad. On 29 January 2026, he was loaned back to Chayka Peschanokopskoye until the end of the 2025–26 season. On 18 June 2026, Popolitov moved on a new loan to Nizhny Novgorod for the 2026–27 season.

== Career statistics ==
As of match played 5 November 2025

Appearances and goals by club, season and competition
Club	Season	League			Cup		Total	
Club	Season	Division	Apps	Goals	Apps	Goals	Apps	Goals
Stroitel Kamensk-Shakhtinsky	2024	Russian Second League B	20	2	1	0	21	2
Spartak-2 Moscow	2025	Russian Second League B	13	5	—		13	5
Chayka Peschanokopskoye	2025–26	Russian First League	9	2	0	0	9	2
CSKA Moscow	2025–26	Russian Premier League	2	0	3	0	5	0
Career total			44	9	4	0	48	9
