= Vladislav Golubev =

Russian footballer (born 2008)

Personal information
- Full name: Vladislav Aleksandrovich Golubev
- Date of birth: 15 July 2008 (age 18)
- Height: 1.84 m (6 ft 0 in)
- Position: Centre-forward

Team information
- Current team: Lokomotiv Moscow
- Number: 63

Youth career
- 2019–2026: Lokomotiv Moscow

Senior career*
Years	Team	Apps	(Gls)
2026–	Lokomotiv Moscow	4	(0)

International career^{‡}
2025	Russia U18	2	(0)
2026–	Russia U19	1	(2)
- * Club domestic league appearances and goals as of 29 August 2026 ‡ National team caps and goals as of 9 June 2026

Vladislav Aleksandrovich Golubev (Russian: Владислав Александрович Голубев; born 15 July 2008) is a Russian football player who plays as a centre-forward for Lokomotiv Moscow.

== Career ==
Golubev joined Lokomotiv Moscow in 2019 and signed his first professional contract with the club in April 2026, running until 2029.

In the summer of 2026, he was moved to the senior squad during the preseason. On 21 July 2026, Golubev signed a new contract with Lokomotiv until 2031.

Golubev made his debut in the Russian Premier League for Lokomotiv on 26 July 2026 in a game against Akhmat Grozny.

== Career statistics ==
As of 13 October 2026

Club	Season	League			Cup		Total	
Club	Season	Division	Apps	Goals	Apps	Goals	Apps	Goals
Lokomotiv Moscow	2026–27	Russian Premier League	4	0	4	0	8	0
Career total			4	0	4	0	8	0
