= Media football =

Version of football played by celebrities

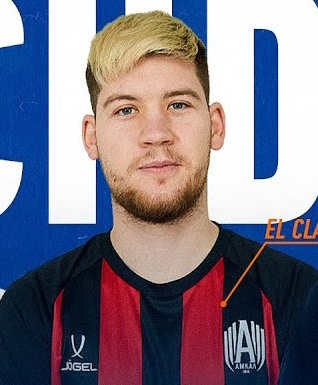
German Popkov, founder of Amkal

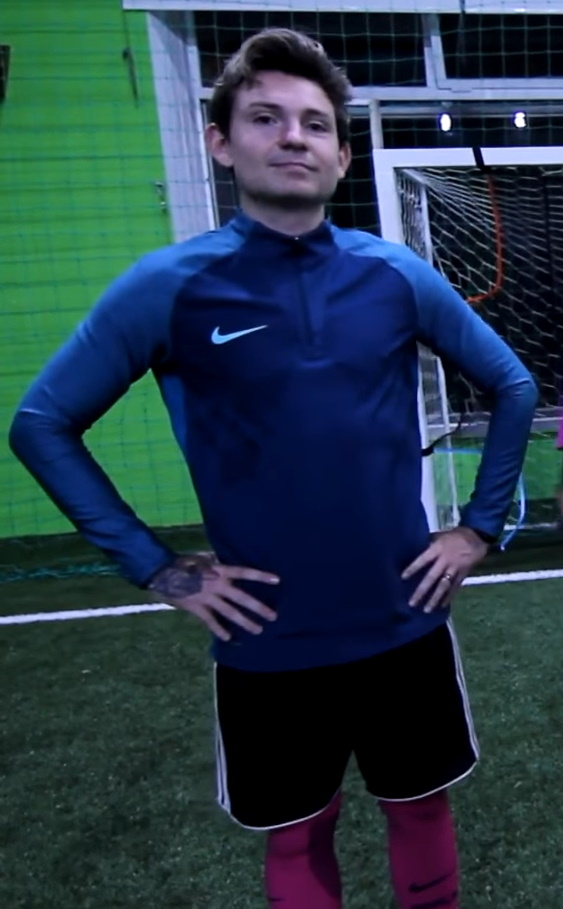
Evgeniy Babenko, one of the founders of 2DROTS

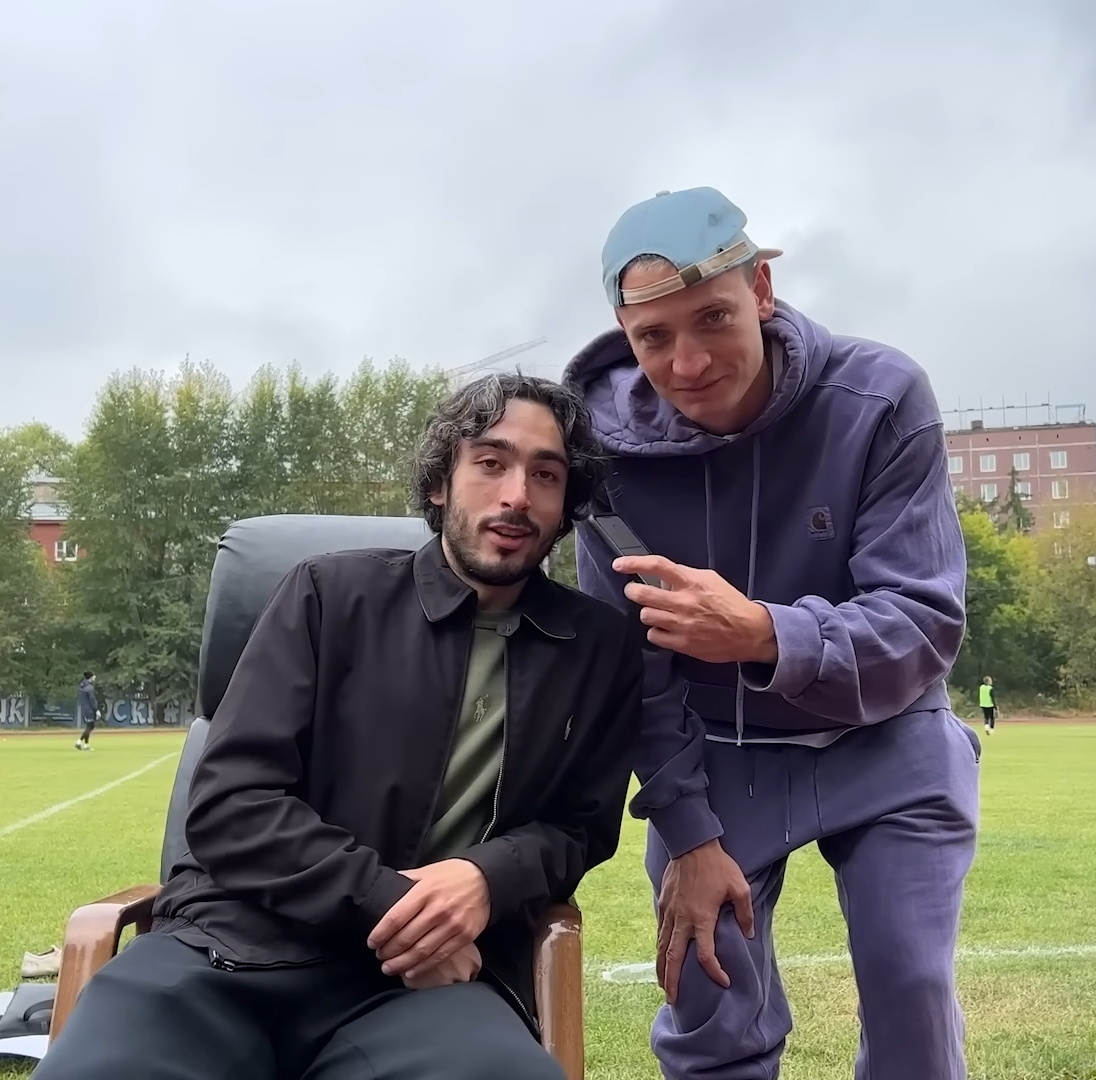
risenHAHA and Dmitriy Egorov, founders of Broke Boys

These teams are considered by journalists to be the most popular in Russian media football.

Media football is a version of football in which the teams are mainly made up of celebrities (such as influencers, actors and business stars). Media football is mostly popular in Russia, having formed there in the late 2010s; Russian teams have held matches between celebrities since the days of the Soviet Union.

== History ==
In 2017, Russian YouTubers who made content based on the FIFA video game series formed the 7F United team. The squad included Kefir, PandaFx, Finito, German El Classico Popkov, Stavr, Den4ik Flomasteroff and Goodmax. They recorded football challenges, but the channel did not last long due to organizational difficulties.

In 2018, after that year's FIFA World Cup, Popkov decided to revive the idea of creating a media football club and invite "fifers" (shortname for FIFA YouTubers) and football bloggers to the project under the temporary name German's Team. Football matches came to replace the challenges, and in August 2018 the team was named Amkal.

In 2020, Popkov organized the Moscow Celebrity Cup, in which 12 teams participated. Among the participants were the teams of Match TV and Comedy Club Production. A team representing YouTube channel 2DROTS also participated in it.

In 2021, Popkov restarted his project. At the same time, the NaSporte club began to gain momentum in media football, which included such celebrities as Danya Milokhin, T-killah and football player Dmitry Tarasov.

In early 2022, a national media football competition was formed, that being the Media Football League (MFL). 2DROTS would win the first two seasons.

In August 2022, Amkal and 2DROTS were invited to participate in the 2022–23 Russian Cup. Ever since, the top teams in the MFL have annually been invited to participate in the tournament, providing a bridge between media football and the professional sport.

Players on media football clubs have gone on to play outside of the ecosystem, with Amkal's Mikhail Prokopyev moving in 2022 to Bulgarian club Botev Plovdiv. In addition, Russian Premier League (RPL) clubs have played against their media football counterparts, with 2DROTS recording a 2-1 friendly win over CSKA Moscow in March 2023.

== Tournaments ==
- Moscow Celebrity Cup
- Media Football League
- Liga Bloggers Cup

== Reception ==
Journalists have noticed the popularity of media football. Ivan Kovalchuk from Eurosport wrote that schoolchildren are "more interested" in watching media football than the RPL. Shamil Gadzhiev from Life emphasized that interest to football bloggers is "sometimes even greater than in recognized sports masters". Sergey Mikhailichenko from Football Culture wrote that today media football is "a fairly serious topic with good investments and a large audience coverage".

The highly influential football commentator Vasily Utkin believed that media football should not be singled out as a separate phenomenon. Anzor Kavazashvili has a positive attitude towards media football. Some other former and current professional football players, such as Oleg Kornaukhov, Sergei Bozhin and Denis Yakuba, on the contrary, are skeptical about media football.

Konstantin Krinsky from Championat.com has noted the participation of media football teams in the Russian Cup and says that it is "a great promoter" during the early rounds. This has been repeated by Russian Minister of Sports Oleg Matytsin.

Mikhail Kerzhakov believes that media football will not be more popular than professional football. Kirill Malyarov wonders why some footballers prefer media football over professional football. Igor Osinkin called media football "quite interesting", but does not believe that it will replace professional football in the near future.

In September 2022, the media outlet The Bookmaker Ratings expressed its support for media football and signed a partnership agreement with the Fight Nights team belongs to the athlete Kamil Gadzhiev.

== See also ==
- Hashtag United F.C., an English team founded by YouTuber Spencer Owen
