= Nikita Yershov =

Russian football player

Personal information
- Full name: Nikita Vladimirovich Yershov
- Date of birth: 17 September 2002 (age 24)
- Place of birth: Shebekino, Russia
- Height: 1.77 m (5 ft 10 in)
- Position: Midfielder

Youth career
- –2020: Akademiya Futbola Shebekino

Senior career*
Years	Team	Apps	(Gls)
2020–2022	Salyut Belgorod	7	(0)
2022	Fakel-M Voronezh	10	(2)
2022–2024	Fakel Voronezh	1	(0)
2023–2024	→ Irtysh Omsk (loan)	41	(3)
2024	Arsenal Dzerzhinsk	7	(0)
2025	Kosmos Dolgoprudny	26	(2)
- * Club domestic league appearances and goals as of 2 November 2025

Nikita Vladimirovich Yershov (Russian: Никита Владимирович Ершов; born 17 September 2002) is a Russian football player.

== Club career ==
He made his debut for FC Fakel Voronezh on 29 September 2022 in a Russian Cup game against PFC Krylia Sovetov Samara. He made his Russian Premier League debut for Fakel on 28 October 2022 against FC Orenburg.

On 22 February 2023, Yershov moved on loan to FC Irtysh Omsk until the end of the season.

== Career statistics ==
As of 27 November 2022

Club	Season	League			Cup		Continental		Total	
Club	Season	Division	Apps	Goals	Apps	Goals	Apps	Goals	Apps	Goals
Salyut Belgorod	2020–21	Second League	6	0	1	0	–		7	0
Salyut Belgorod	2021–22	Second League	1	0	1	0	–		2	0
Salyut Belgorod	Total		7	0	2	0	0	0	9	0
Fakel-M Voronezh	2021–22	Second League	10	2	–		–		10	2
Fakel Voronezh	2022–23	RPL	1	0	1	0	–		2	0
Career total			18	2	3	0	0	0	21	2
