= Lokomotiv Stadium (Saratov) =

Football stadium in Saratov, Russia

Coordinates: 51°32′21″N 45°59′55″E

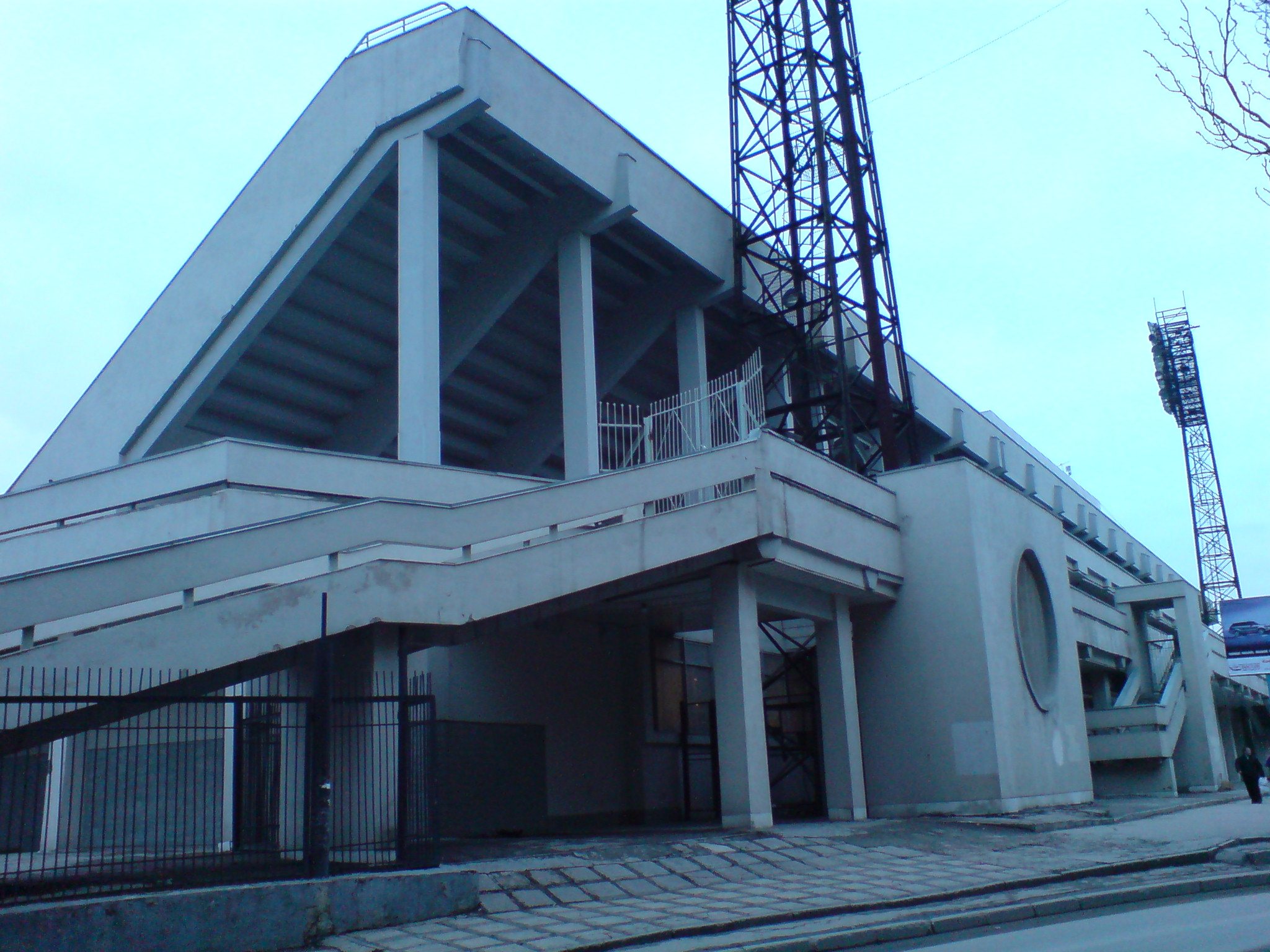
Lokomotiv Stadium in 2008

Lokomotiv Stadium (Russian: Стадион Локомотив) is a multi-use stadium located in Atkarskaya Street, Saratov, Russia.

Lokomotiv Stadium currently used mostly for association football matches, hosting the home matches of FC Sokol Saratov. The stadium holds up to 15,000 people.
