= FC Neftyanik Izberbash =

Neftyanik Izberbash
- Full name: Football Club Neftyanik Izberbash
- Founded: 2025
- Ground: Trud Stadium, Makhachkala
- Capacity: 5,600
- Manager: Renat Miftakhov
- League: Russian Second League; Division B Group 1
- 2026: 11th

FC Neftyanik Izberbash (Russian: ФК «Нефтяник» Избербаш) is a Russian football club based in Izberbash.

== Club history ==
Neftyanik started playing in the Russian Amateur Football League in 2025. For the 2026 season, Neftyanik was licensed for the fourth-tier Russian Second League Division B. It was assigned to Group 1.

== Current squad ==
As of 11 September 2026

Note: Flags indicate national team as defined under FIFA eligibility rules; some limited exceptions apply. Players may hold more than one non-FIFA nationality.

No.	Pos.	Nation	Player
1	GK	RUS	Nasukh Ibragimov
3	DF	RUS	Ali Akayev
4	DF	RUS	Magomednur Isayev
5	DF	RUS	Gadzhi Kurbanov
6	DF	RUS	Kagir Salikhov
7	MF	RUS	Said Kerimov
8	FW	RUS	Said Mirzabekov
9	FW	RUS	Asilder Temirsultanov
10	MF	RUS	Guseyn Karayev
11	MF	RUS	Shakhban Magomedov
12	FW	RUS	Abdusalam Abdusalamov
13	DF	RUS	Islam Umarov
14	MF	RUS	Kamil M. Abdullayev
15	MF	RUS	Magomed Kurbanov
17	MF	RUS	Magomed Gamzatov

No.	Pos.	Nation	Player
18	MF	RUS	Artur Aliyev
21	MF	RUS	Gairbeg Manapov
22	MF	RUS	Magomedsultan Yarakhmedov
24	MF	RUS	Kamil K. Abdullayev
26	DF	RUS	Atay Gadzhimuratov
27	DF	RUS	Omar Magomedov
28	MF	RUS	Magomedrashid Abdulmedzhidov
30	GK	RUS	Akhmed Davudov
33	GK	RUS	Shapigadzhi Magomedkerimov
35	GK	RUS	Allay Magomedov
47	MF	RUS	Daniyal Aliyev
77	MF	RUS	Shamil Abdullayev
90	MF	RUS	Zagid Ragimov
91	MF	RUS	Khanmagomed Khanmagomedov
