= Media Football League =

- Founded: 2022
- Region: Russia
- Current champions: Broke Boys

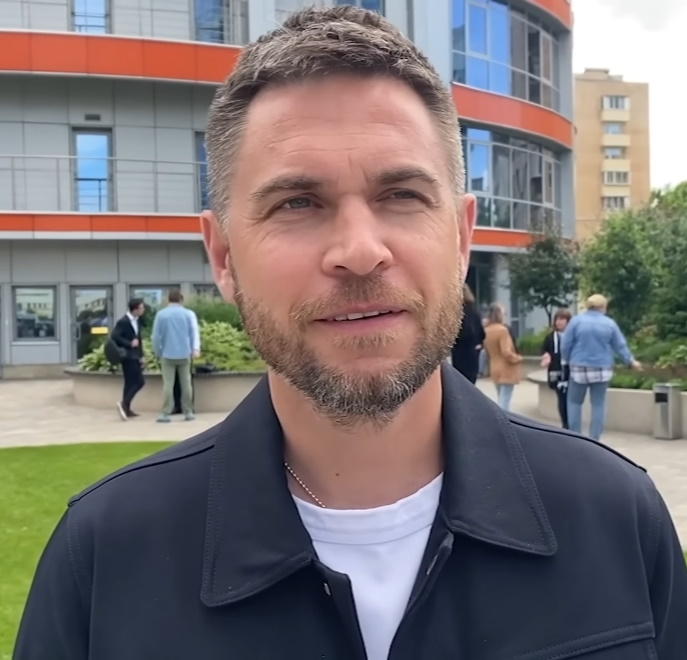
Nikolai Osipov, founder of the Media Football League

Media Football League (MFL; Russian: Медийная футбольная лига (МФЛ)) is a Russian football tournament for media teams.

== History ==
Nikolay Osipov founded the MFL in 2022. During the second season, Osipov announced that his own stadium with an orange lawn would be built. In October 2022, it became known that the Medialiga would have a second division. At the end of the same month, news also appeared that Medialiga could begin to be broadcast on the Match TV channel.

The first season of the league, which lasted from April to July 2022, was attended by 2DROTS, LFC Roma, Starmix, Na Sporte, Match TV, Basement, FC Art, SD Family, Reality and Broke Boys. In the end, which took place on 10 July at VTB Arena, in the presence of 11,000 spectators, 2DROTS beat Basement with a score of 4-0 and became the league champion and won a prize of 5 million rubles. After that, the acting president of the Russian Premier League, Alexander Alaev, said that the winner of the league could get the right to participate in the Russian Cup.

In the second season of the league, the teams were divided into 2 groups: Group A included Reality, LFC Roma, Amkal, Na Sporte, Bay Begi, Tamo Junto, Rodina Media, FC 10 and Broke Boys; in group "B" - FC Dengi, Watch TV (former "Match TV"), Goats, SD Family, MFK "Rubin" (media team as department of FC Rubin Kazan), 2DROTS, Egrisi, Fight Nights and Our guys. Dengi and Goats got to the league through voting among fans on the Sports.ru portal. In the form of sponsorship contracts with the league and teams, the second season was financed by betting companies in the amount of about 250 million rubles. The title sponsor was Winline.

The season started on 16 September 2022. After the 2nd round, the media reported on the departure of a number of team members from the clubs due to the partial mobilization announced as part of the preparations to the advanced stages of the Russian invasion of Ukraine. The final match between 2DROTS and Rodina Media was held on 3 December at the stadium of the FC Krasnodar Academy (the semi-finals were also held there on 29 and 30 November). In regular time, the match ended in a draw 1-1, and a series of bullets (a mixture of penalties and shootouts) was won by 2DROTS with a score of 3-1. The team earned 7.5 million rubles for the victory.

== Finals ==
| Season | Date | Champion | Score | Finalist | Stadium | Spectators |
|---|---|---|---|---|---|---|
| 1 | 10 July 2022 | 2DROTS | 4:0 | Basement | VTB Arena, (Moscow) | 11,000 |
| 2 | 3 December 2022 | 2DROTS | 1:1 (3:1) | Rodina Media | FC Krasnodar Academy, | 7,500 |
| 3 | 1 July 2023 | Rodina Media | 3:1 | 2DROTS | Luzhniki Stadium, (Moscow) | 21,000 |
| 4 | 22 October 2023 | Titan | 1:1 (4:3) | Broke Boys | Volgograd Arena, | 22,000 |
| 5 | 15 July 2024 | Broke Boys | 3:0 | 2DROTS | VEB Arena, (Moscow) | 27,000 |

== Reception ==
Vladislav Zimagulov, correspondent of the Sport Express newspaper, called Media Football League a "risky project" that "became successful". Anton Zinkovsky from Komsomolskaya Pravda wrote that "Media Football League is the most discussed event in the Russian sports world".

== See also ==
- Russian Cup (football)
