= Damián Puebla =

Argentine footballer (born 2002)

Personal information
- Date of birth: 15 September 2002 (age 24)
- Place of birth: Córdoba, Argentina
- Height: 1.70 m (5 ft 7 in)
- Positions: Midfielder; winger

Team information
- Current team: Orenburg
- Number: 8

Youth career
- –2019: Racing de Córdoba
- 2019–2022: Boca
- 2023: Instituto

Senior career*
Years	Team	Apps	(Gls)
2023–2025	Instituto	53	(7)
2026–	Orenburg	27	(0)
- * Club domestic league appearances and goals as of 21 November 2026

Damián Puebla (born 15 September 2002) is an Argentine professional footballer who plays as a midfielder or winger for Russian club Orenburg.

== Early life ==
Puebla was born on 15 September 2002 and has been nicknamed "Nino". Born in Córdoba, Argentina, he grew up in the city.

== Career ==
As a youth player, Puebla joined the youth academy of Argentine side Racing de Córdoba. Following his stint there, he joined the youth academy of Argentine side Boca in 2019.

Three years later, he joined the youth academy of Argentine side Instituto and was promoted to the club's senior team ahead of the 2023 season, where he made fifty-three league appearances and scored seven goals. During January 2026, he signed for Russian side Orenburg.

== Career statistics ==
As of 21 November 2026

Club	Season	League			Cup		Other		Total	
Club	Season	Division	Apps	Goals	Apps	Goals	Apps	Goals	Apps	Goals
Instituto	2023	AFA Liga Profesional de Fútbol	1	0	0	0	1 (Note: Appearances in Copa de la Liga Profesional)	0	2	0
Instituto	2024	AFA Liga Profesional de Fútbol	27	5	0	0	13	6	40	11
Instituto	2025	AFA Liga Profesional de Fútbol	25	2	2	0	1 (Note: Appearances in Playoff Torneo Apertura)	0	28	2
Instituto	Total		53	7	2	0	15	6	70	13
Orenburg	2025–26	Russian Premier League	12	0	0	0	—		12	0
Orenburg	2026–27	Russian Premier League	15	0	4	3	—		19	3
Orenburg	Total		27	0	4	3	0	0	31	3
Career total			80	7	6	3	15	6	101	16
