= Yegor Sysoyev =

Russian footballer (born 2006)

Personal information
- Full name: Yegor Olegovich Sysoyev
- Date of birth: 24 March 2006 (age 20)
- Place of birth: Kimry, Tver Oblast, Russia
- Height: 1.80 m (5 ft 11 in)
- Position: Forward

Team information
- Current team: Sokol Saratov
- Number: 20

Youth career
- –2019: Volna Dubna
- 2020–2024: Spartak Moscow

Senior career*
Years	Team	Apps	(Gls)
2025–2026	Torpedo Moscow	1	(0)
2025–2026	→ Veles Moscow (loan)	30	(3)
2026–	Sokol Saratov	18	(0)

International career^{‡}
2021–2022	Russia U-16	7	(0)
2022–2023	Russia U-17	7	(3)
2023	Russia U-18	3	(0)
2024	Russia U-19	2	(0)
2025	Russia U-20	2	(0)
- * Club domestic league appearances and goals as of 15 November 2026 ‡ National team caps and goals as of 7 June 2025

Yegor Olegovich Sysoyev (Russian: Егор Олегович Сысоев; born 24 March 2006) is a Russian footballer who plays as a forward for Sokol Saratov.

== Club career ==
He made his debut in the Russian First League for Torpedo Moscow on 6 April 2025 in a game against Rotor Volgograd.

== Career statistics ==
As of 24 May 2025

Club	Season	League			Cup		Continental		Total	
Club	Season	Division	Apps	Goals	Apps	Goals	Apps	Goals	Apps	Goals
Torpedo Moscow	2024–25	Russian First League	1	0	0	0	–		1	0
Career total			1	0	0	0	0	0	1	0
