= Kevin Arévalo =

Uruguayan footballer (born 2001)

Personal information
- Full name: Kevin Nahuel Arévalo Díaz
- Date of birth: 6 June 2006 (age 20)
- Place of birth: Fray Bentos, Uruguay
- Height: 1.70 m (5 ft 7 in)
- Position: Winger

Team information
- Current team: Akron Tolyatti
- Number: 10

Youth career
- –2025: Montevideo City Torque

Senior career*
Years	Team	Apps	(Gls)
2025	Montevideo City Torque	15	(4)
2026–	Akron Tolyatti	13	(2)
- * Club domestic league appearances and goals as of 13 September 2026

Kevin Nahuel Arévalo Díaz (born 6 June 2006) is a Uruguayan professional footballer who plays as a winger for Russian club Akron Tolyatti.

== Early life ==
Arévalo was born on 9 June 2006. Born in Fray Bentos, Uruguay, he is a native of the city.

== Career ==
As a youth player, Arévalo joined the youth academy of Uruguayan side Montevideo City Torque and was promoted to the club's senior team ahead of the 2025 season, where he made fifteen league appearances and scored four goals. Following his stint there, he signed for Russian Premier League side Akron Tolyatti during January 2026.

== Career statistics ==
As of 28 October 2026

Club	Season	League			Cup		Total	
Club	Season	Division	Apps	Goals	Apps	Goals	Apps	Goals
Montevideo City Torque	2025	Liga AUF Uruguaya	15	4	0	0	15	4
Akron Tolyatti	2025–26	Russian Premier League	6	1	—		6	1
Akron Tolyatti	2026–27	Russian Premier League	7	1	4	1	11	2
Akron Tolyatti	Total		13	2	4	1	17	3
Career total			28	6	4	1	32	7
