= Vladimir Ignatenko (footballer) =

Russian footballer (born 2006)

Personal information
- Full name: Vladimir Vsevolodovich Ignatenko
- Date of birth: 11 May 2006 (age 20)
- Place of birth: Simferopol, Ukraine
- Height: 1.94 m (6 ft 4 in)
- Position: Centre-forward

Team information
- Current team: Nizhny Novgorod
- Number: 91

Youth career
- –2022: DFSh RK-Sport Simferopol
- 2022–2023: Krylia Sovetov Samara

Senior career*
Years	Team	Apps	(Gls)
2024–2026	Krylia Sovetov Samara	21	(4)
2024–2026	→ Krylia Sovetov-2 Samara	43	(12)
2026–	Nizhny Novgorod	0	(0)
- * Club domestic league appearances and goals as of 6 September 2026

Vladimir Vsevolodovich Ignatenko (Russian: Владимир Всеволодович Игнатенко; born 11 May 2006) is a Russian football player who plays as a centre-forward for Nizhny Novgorod.

== Career ==
Ignatenko made his debut in the Russian Premier League for Krylia Sovetov Samara on 25 July 2025 in a game against Pari Nizhny Novgorod.

== Personal life ==
Ignatenko was born in Ukraine and acquired Russian citizenship following the Russian annexation of Crimea

== Career statistics ==
As of 17 May 2026

Club	Season	League			Cup		Total	
Club	Season	Division	Apps	Goals	Apps	Goals	Apps	Goals
Krylia Sovetov-2 Samara	2024	Russian Second League B	24	7	–		24	7
Krylia Sovetov-2 Samara	2025	Russian Second League B	7	0	–		7	0
Krylia Sovetov-2 Samara	Total		31	7	0	0	31	7
Krylia Sovetov Samara	2024–25	Russian Premier League	0	0	0	0	0	0
Krylia Sovetov Samara	2025–26	Russian Premier League	21	4	8	0	29	4
Krylia Sovetov Samara	Total		21	4	8	0	29	4
Career total			52	11	8	0	60	11
