= FC Sokol Saratov =

Russian football club

Sokol
- Full name: Professional Football Club; Sokol Saratov
- Founded: 1930; 96 years ago
- Ground: Lokomotiv Stadium, Saratov
- Capacity: 15,000
- Chairman: Aleksey Potapov
- Manager: Mikhail Belov
- League: Russian Second League; Division A Gold Group
- 2025–26: Russian First League, 17th of 18 (relegated)
- Website: sokol-saratov.ru
Home colours	Away colours

PFC Sokol (Russian: ПФК "Сокол") is a Russian association football club based in Saratov. In 2001 and 2002, Sokol played in the Russian Premier League. The club plays in the third-tier Russian Second League.

== History ==
The club was founded as Dynamo. It was known by this name until 1930 and in 1946–1953. Other club's names include Lokomotiv (1956–1960), Energiya (1954–1955), Sokol (1961–1994 and 1998–2005), and Sokol-PZD (1995–1997). "Sokol" is Russian for "falcon".

Dynamo did not enter the Soviet league until 1946, when they debuted in the Third Group and were promoted to the Second Group at the first time of asking. Dynamo played in the Second Group until 1949. After a period of absence in the league, the club entered Class B in 1954 under new name, Energia. After a considerable time spent in Class B, Sokol were eventually promoted to Class A, Group 2 in 1965. Sokol played there until 1970. In 1971–1991, they played in the Second League.

In 1992 Sokol entered the newly formed Russian First Division. They played in this division until 2000, never finishing lower than 10th, and eventually won it. The 2001 season was the best in club's history. Sokol were leading in mid-season, but could not keep up and finished 8th in the Top Division. Andrey Fedkov, Sokol's striker, was capped for Russia national team. The next year Sokol were relegated after finishing last in the league.

The club continued playing in the First Division since 2003. In 2005 Sokol finished last thanks to a points deduction for failing to pay for player transfer. Instead of starting in the Second Division in 2006, Sokol chose to play in the Amateur League. In addition, the club was renamed Sokol-Saratov.

Sokol reached the semifinals of the Soviet Cup in 1966/67 and of the Russian Cup in 2000/01.

On 29 May 2023, Sokol ensured promotion back into the second-tier Russian First League.

At the end of the 2024–25 Russian First League season, Sokol qualified for relegation to the third-tier Russian Second League Division A. However, as Khimki, which played in the Premier League, were dissolved, Sokol was kept in the First League. At the end of the 2025–26 Russian First League season, Sokol finished in the relegation zone again.

== Current squad ==
As of 22 September 2026, according to the Second League website.

Note: Flags indicate national team as defined under FIFA eligibility rules; some limited exceptions apply. Players may hold more than one non-FIFA nationality.

No.	Pos.	Nation	Player
1	GK	RUS	Sergey Savkin
4	DF	RUS	Ilya Kalachyov
6	MF	RUS	Yegor Larionov
7	DF	RUS	Aleksandr Perchenok
9	FW	RUS	Vladislav Shpitalny
10	MF	RUS	Anton Mukhin
11	FW	RUS	Artemi Ukomsky
12	MF	RUS	Aleksey Ismagilov
15	GK	RUS	Timofey Kashintsev
17	MF	RUS	Andrey Anisimov
18	MF	RUS	Nikita Miroshnichenko
19	FW	RUS	Vladislav Rudenko
20	MF	RUS	Yegor Sysoyev
21	FW	RUS	Gleb Donchenko

No.	Pos.	Nation	Player
22	FW	RUS	Vladislav Kostin
23	MF	BLR	Ilya Vasilevich
25	DF	RUS	Marat Rakhmatulin
26	DF	RUS	Ilya Klementyev
33	DF	RUS	Nikita Gloydman
35	GK	RUS	Pyotr Kosarevsky
51	DF	RUS	Anton Sinyak
75	MF	RUS	Maksim Mayorov
77	MF	RUS	Dmitri Sasin
88	DF	RUS	Kirill Shubin
92	DF	RUS	Ivan Shilyonok
95	DF	RUS	Ilya Gaponov
97	MF	RUS	Artyom Malakhov
99	MF	RUS	Vladimir Azarov

=== Out on loan ===
Note: Flags indicate national team as defined under FIFA eligibility rules; some limited exceptions apply. Players may hold more than one non-FIFA nationality.

No.	Pos.	Nation	Player
—	MF	RUS	Anton Yegorushkin (at Zenit Penza until 31 December 2026)

== Reserve squad ==
Sokol's reserve squad played professionally as FC Sokol-d Saratov in the Russian Third League in 1994.

== Notable players ==
Had international caps for their respective countries. Players whose name is listed in bold represented their countries while playing for Sokol.

USSR/Russia

- (Soviet Union) Viktor Samokhin
- (Soviet Union) (Commonwealth of Independent States) (Russia) Dmitri Kuznetsov
- (Soviet Union) (Russia) Vladimir Tatarchuk
- (Commonwealth of Independent States) (Russia) Dmitri Khlestov
- (Commonwealth of Independent States) (Russia) Andrei Piatnitski
- (Russia) Albert Borzenkov
- (Russia) **Andrei Fedkov**
- (Russia) Denis Kolodin
- (Russia) Aleksei Kosolapov
- (Russia) Vladimir Lebed
- (Russia) Andrei Semyonov
- (Russia) Aleksandr Sheshukov
- (Russia) Oleg Teryokhin
- (Russia) Oleg Veretennikov

Former USSR countries

- (Armenia) **Karapet Mikaelyan**
- (Azerbaijan) **Deni Gaisumov**
- (Belarus) **Gennadi Bliznyuk**
- (Belarus) **Artem Chelyadinsky**
- (Belarus) **Alyaksandr Hrapkowski**
- (Belarus) **Petr Katchouro**
- (Belarus) Vladimir Sheleg
- (Belarus) Vitali Trubila
- (Belarus) **Vital Valadzyankow**
- (Belarus) **Pavel Zabelin**
- (Georgia (country)) Zviad Jeladze
- (Georgia (country)) Mikheil Jishkariani
- (Kazakhstan) **Ruslan Baltiev**
- (Kazakhstan) Vitaliy Kafanov
- (Kazakhstan) Dmitriy Lyapkin
- (Kazakhstan) **Oleg Musin**
- (Kazakhstan) Maksim Nizovtsev
- (Kazakhstan) **Yevgeni Tarasov**
- (Kazakhstan) Sergey Timofeev
- (Latvia) **Vladislavs Gabovs**
- (Lithuania) **Raimondas Vainoras**
- (Moldova) **Serghei Epureanu**
- (Tajikistan) Yuri Baturenko
- (Ukraine) Andriy Annenkov
- (Ukraine) Yuriy Hrytsyna
- (Ukraine) Oleksandr Koval
- (Ukraine) Hennadiy Orbu
- (Ukraine) Vladyslav Prudius
- (Ukraine) Dmytro Tiapushkin
- (Uzbekistan) **Victor Karpenko**
- (Uzbekistan) Maksim Shatskikh

Europe

- (Bosnia and Herzegovina) Senad Repuh
- (Bosnia and Herzegovina) Edin Šaranović
- (Romania) Ovidiu Cuc
