= FC 2DROTS Moscow =

Association football club in Russia

2DROTS
- Nickname: Samurai
- Manager: Shamil Kurbanov
- League: Media Football League
Home colours

2DROTS is a Russian football club based in Moscow. It is among the most popular media football clubs in Russia. YouTube channel of 2DROT was created in June 2016. On 10 July 2022, 2DROTS became champion of the first season of the Media Football League, and after that club was invited to the 2022–23 Russian Cup. They progressed until 1/128 round at which they lost to FC Tekstilshchik Ivanovo. On 3 December 2022, 2DROTS became the winners of the 2nd season of the Media Football League. The team did not win the third season of MFL, but as a finalist club were invited to the 2023–24 Russian Cup, which they lost at 1/32 against FC Khimki. 2DROTS lost in the final of MFL-5 against Broke Boys. The team was again invited to the Russian Cup. 2DROTS was eliminated in the second round. In the 2025–26 season the team was again eliminated in the second round. In the 2026–27 season 2DROTS was eliminated in the third round.

== 2022 squad ==
Note: Flags indicate national team as defined under FIFA eligibility rules; some limited exceptions apply. Players may hold more than one non-FIFA nationality.

No.	Pos.	Nation	Player
1	GK	RUS	Andrey Belov
68	GK	RUS	Dmitriy Sychev
4	DF	RUS	Ilya Salnikov
26	DF	RUS	Denis Gudayev
94	DF	RUS	Aleksandr Stepanov
71	DF	RUS	Artur Beglaryan
93	DF	RUS	Bogdan Timoshenko
77	MF	RUS	Oleg Bondar
70	MF	RUS	Stanislav Manaev
8	MF	RUS	Aleksandr Yarosh

No.	Pos.	Nation	Player
19	MF	RUS	Walter Sklyar Edams
37	MF	RUS	Vladislav Oslonovsky
33	MF	RUS	Boris Fartuna
7	FW	RUS	Daniil Krapivnikov
30	FW	RUS	Aleksandr Stepanov
15	FW	RUS	Vladislav Korotaev
97	FW	RUS	Maksim Frolov
22	FW	RUS	Sergey Kutuzov
88	FW	RUS	Artem Talabko

== Notable players ==
Players who played for 2DROTS and had caps for their respective national team:

(Russia) Maksim Kanunnikov
