= FC Leningradets Leningrad Oblast =

Russian football team from Saint Petersburg

FC Leningradets
- Full name: Football Club Leningradets Leningrad Oblast
- Founded: 2018; 8 years ago
- Ground: Petrovsky Stadium, Saint Petersburg
- Capacity: 20,985
- Owner: LSR Group
- Chairman: Igor Levit
- Manager: Sergei Podpaly
- League: Russian First League
- 2025–26: Russian Second League; Division A Gold Group; Second stage: 1st (promoted)
- Website: fc-leningradec.ru
Home colours	Away colours

FC Leningradets Leningrad Oblast (Russian: Футбольный клуб «Ленинградец») is a Russian football team from Leningrad Oblast.

== History ==
Following the bankruptcy of FC Tosno, Leningrad Oblast governor decided to organize a new professional club. It received the license for the third-tier Russian Professional Football League for the 2018–19 season.

The club's office is located in Prudy, Vyborgsky District, but majority of the games are played at Saint Petersburg stadiums. The club also previously played in Roshchino.

On 28 May 2023, the club secured promotion to the Russian First League. Leningradets was relegated back to third tier after one season on second level.

On 7 June 2026, Leningradets secured another promotion back to Russian First League.

== Stadium ==
Leningradets hosts its home matches at Petrovsky Stadium in Saint Petersburg, sometimes also at Nova Arena in Saint Petersburg and at the Roshchino Arena in Roshchino.

== Current squad ==
As of 11 September 2026, according to the First League website.

Note: Flags indicate national team as defined under FIFA eligibility rules; some limited exceptions apply. Players may hold more than one non-FIFA nationality.

No.	Pos.	Nation	Player
1	GK	RUS	Yegor Smirnov
2	DF	RUS	Sergey Nikolayev
3	DF	RUS	Erving Botaka
4	DF	RUS	Roman Kudryavtsev
5	MF	RUS	Kirill Morozov
6	MF	RUS	Daniil Rodin
7	FW	RUS	Dmitry Nikitin (on loan from Baltika Kaliningrad)
9	FW	RUS	Matvey Pershin
10	MF	KGZ	Eldiyar Zarypbekov
14	MF	CMR	Olivier Kenfack (on loan from Yenisey Krasnoyarsk)
11	FW	RUS	Dmitry Yakovlev
16	GK	RUS	Sergey Starkov
19	DF	RUS	Artur Maksetsov
20	MF	RUS	Rustam Zobov

No.	Pos.	Nation	Player
21	MF	BLR	Anatol Makaraw
23	FW	RUS	Ilya Stefanovich
30	DF	RUS	Yegor Kozyrev
31	DF	RUS	Ivan Orlyansky
32	MF	RUS	Artyom Kulishev
33	MF	RUS	Kirill Butsev
37	DF	RUS	Kirill Isayev (on loan from Krylia Sovetov Samara)
44	DF	RUS	Nikita Kalugin
52	MF	RUS	Ilya Petukhov
77	FW	RUS	Maksim Bachinsky
78	DF	RUS	Gennadi Kiselyov
83	MF	RUS	Ivan Petrov (on loan from Rostov)
96	GK	RUS	Aleksey Kuznetsov
99	MF	RUS	Danila Yemelyanov

=== Out on loan ===
Note: Flags indicate national team as defined under FIFA eligibility rules; some limited exceptions apply. Players may hold more than one non-FIFA nationality.

No.	Pos.	Nation	Player
—	FW	RUS	Nikita Tereshchuk (at Dnepr Mogilev until 31 December 2026)

== See also ==
- Leningradets Gatchina
