= 2024–25 Russian Cup =

2024–25 Fonbet Russian Cup

Tournament details
- Country: Russia
- Teams: 107

Final positions
- Champions: CSKA Moscow
- Runners-up: Rostov
- All statistics correct as of 1 June 2025.

The 2024–25 Russian Cup was the 33rd season of the Russian football knockout tournament since the dissolution of the Soviet Union. The competition started on 30 July 2024 and concluded on 1 June 2025.

The winner of the cup would normally gain entry into the 2025–26 UEFA Europa League; however, on 28 February 2022, Russian football clubs were suspended from FIFA & UEFA international competitions until further notice due to the Russian invasion of Ukraine.

== Representation of clubs by league ==
- Russian Premier League (1): 16 clubs
- Russian First League (2): 18 clubs
- Division A of Russian Second League (3): 18 clubs (without 2 farm teams)
- Division B of Russian Second League (4): 42 clubs (without 17 farm teams and 2 Crimean teams)
- Amateur leagues:
  - Third division (5): 8 clubs
  - Fourth division (regional leagues) (6): 2 clubs
  - Media amateur clubs (7): 3 clubs
- Total: 107 clubs.

== Distribution ==
The teams of Premier League and the other teams will qualify to knockout phase in two different paths. Premier league teams will play in the RPL path group stage with a double round-robin tournament, divided into 4 groups with 4 teams in each group, while the other teams will play in the regions path qualification, starting with 1/256 round until 1/8 round with 1 match in each stage.

== Schedule ==
The schedule of the competition is as follows:

Phase	Round			Match date
Qualifying rounds (regions path)	Round 1			30 July – 1 August 2024
Qualifying rounds (regions path)	Round 2			20–22 August 2024
Qualifying rounds (regions path)	Round 3			3–5 September 2024
Qualifying rounds (regions path)	Round 4			24–26 September 2024
Qualifying rounds (regions path)	Round 5			15–17 October 2024
Qualifying rounds (regions path)	Round 6			29–31 October 2024
Group stage (RPL path)	Matchday 1			30 July – 1 August 2024
Group stage (RPL path)	Matchday 2			13–15 August 2024
Group stage (RPL path)	Matchday 3			27–28 August 2024
Group stage (RPL path)	Matchday 4			17–19 September 2024
Group stage (RPL path)	Matchday 5			1–3 October 2024
Group stage (RPL path)	Matchday 6			22–24 October 2024
Knockout stage	Quarter-finals	RPL path	Match 1	5–7 November 2024
Knockout stage	Quarter-finals	RPL path	Match 2	26–28 November 2024
Knockout stage	Quarter-finals	Regions path	Stage 1	26–28 November 2024
Knockout stage	Quarter-finals	Regions path	Stage 2	11–13 March 2025
Knockout stage	Semi-finals	RPL path	Match 1	11–13 March 2025
Knockout stage	Semi-finals	RPL path	Match 2	15–17 April 2025
Knockout stage	Semi-finals	Regions path	Stage 1	15–17 April 2025
Knockout stage	Semi-finals	Regions path	Stage 2	30 April – 2 May 2025
Knockout stage	Path finals	RPL path	Match 1	30 April – 2 May 2025
Knockout stage	Path finals	RPL path	Match 2	13–15 May 2025
Knockout stage	Path finals	Regions path		13–15 May 2025
Knockout stage	Final			1 June 2025

== Qualifying round (regions path) ==
The draw for qualifying stage rounds 1 and 2 was held on 15 July 2024.

=== Round 1 ===
Entered clubs:

- 13 clubs from Amateur leagues
- 21 lowest clubs from Russian Second League Division B

Date of matches was determined on 24 July 2024.

Times are MSK (UTC+3), as listed by RFU (local times, if different, are in parentheses).

30 July 2024	2Drots Moscow (7)	1–0	Strogino Moscow (4)	Moscow
16:00	Terekhov 90+2'	Report		Stadium: Moskvich Stadium; Attendance: 3,708; Referee: Danila Tsurkov

30 July 2024	Orgenergostroy Dimitrovgrad (5)	3–3 (3–4 p)	Lada-Tolyatti (4)	Dimitrovgrad
17:00	Shageev 15'; Pepinov 45+7'; Nuretdinov 90+4'	Report	Bosov 37'; Kuznetsov 56' (o.g.); Makhmutov 64'	Stadium: Torpedo Stadium; Attendance: 2,500; Referee: Maksim Sukhanov
	Penalties
	Danilin (penalty scored); Kuznetsov (penalty scored); Kudryashov (penalty missed); Logunov (penalty missed); Kurochkin (penalty scored); Ivashchov (penalty missed)		(penalty scored) Paskin; (penalty scored) Zinovich; (penalty missed) Stroganov; (penalty scored) Makhmutov; (penalty missed) Punegov; (penalty scored) Gogniyev

30 July 2024	Ilpar Ilyinsky (5)	0–2	Uralets-TS Nizhny Tagil (4)	Perm
18:00 (20:00 YEKT)		Report	Podbeltsev 47'; Smolnikov 86'	Stadium: Zvezda Stadium; Attendance: 372; Referee: Danil Tkachenko

30 July 2024	Kuban-Holding Pavlovskaya (4)	2–1	Druzhba Maykop (4)	Pavlovskaya
18:00	Revazov 28', 57' (pen.)	Report	Orazaev 77'	Stadium: Urozhay Stadium; Attendance: 450; Referee: Vladislav Shipkov

30 July 2024	Cherepovets-SSHOR Vityaz (5)	0–1	Dynamo Vologda (4)	Cherepovets
18:30		Report	Dolgov 52'	Stadium: Metallurg Stadium; Attendance: 530; Referee: Evgeniy Timofeev

31 July 2024	Anri Vladivostok (6)	1–5	Dynamo Vladivostok (4)	Vladivostok
12:30 (19:30 VLAT)	Sapalev 34'	Report	Shestakov 26'; Dorokhov 55'; Sergeyev 73'; Rashchupkin 80' (pen.); Leonov 82'	Stadium: Dynamo Stadium; Attendance: 2,137; Referee: Makar Yanchuk

31 July 2024	Temp Barnaul (5)	2–1	Dynamo Barnaul (4)	Barnaul
15:00 (19:00 KRAT)	Babich 50'; Knyazev 80'	Report	Abramov 26'	Stadium: Dynamo Stadium; Attendance: 5,017; Referee: Mikhail Vorobjev

31 July 2024	Pobeda Khasavyurt (4)	1–0	Angusht Nazran (4)	Khasavyurt
16:00	Abdulaev 10'	Report		Stadium: Arsanali Murtazaliev Stadium; Attendance: 620; Referee: Islam Gaziev

31 July 2024	SSH-Leningradets Leningrad Oblast (5)	1–3	Dynamo Saint Petersburg (4)	Roshchino
17:00	Rodionov 1'	Report	Fateev 53'; Chernomyrdin 71', 90+1'	Stadium: Roshchino Arena Stadium; Attendance: 230; Referee: Artem Kharin

31 July 2024	SSHOR 1-Kristall Saint Petersburg (5)	4–1	Zvezda Saint Petersburg (4)	Saint Petersburg
17:00	Bokovoy 27', 49'; Vartanyan 46'; Andreychikov 90+2'	Report	Medinskiy 80'	Stadium: Nova Arena Stadium; Attendance: 380; Referee: Artem Kharin

31 July 2024	Broke Boys (7)	1–1 (4–2 p)	Kvant Obninsk (4)	Odintsovo
18:00	Plesco 56'	Report	Dyomin 28'	Stadium: Central Stadium; Attendance: 1,680; Referee: Petr Shilin
	Penalties
	Chyorny (penalty scored); Rozyev (penalty scored); Davydov (penalty scored); Plesco (penalty scored)		(penalty scored) Nikitin; (penalty missed) Ositsin; (penalty scored) Melnikov; (penalty missed) Zakharov

31 July 2024	Nart Cherkessk (4)	1–2	Biolog-Novokubansk (4)	Cherkessk
18:00	Bostanov 45+1'	Report	Pereverzev 15'; Tsogoev 18' (pen.)	Stadium: Nart Stadium; Attendance: 562; Referee: Aleksey Koltunov

31 July 2024	Pskov (5)	1–1 (3–4 p)	Luki-Energiya Velikiye Luki (4)	Pskov
19:00	Volkov 52'	Report	Polyakov 70' (pen.)	Stadium: Mashinostroitel Stadium; Attendance: 2,350; Referee: Kirill Garafutdinov
	Penalties
	Volkov (penalty scored); Paranin (penalty scored); Alekssev (penalty scored); Vinogradov (penalty missed); Silantjev (penalty missed)		(penalty scored) Spodarets; (penalty scored) Polyakov; (penalty scored) Ivanov; (penalty scored) Alelyunas; (penalty missed) Agaronyan

1 August 2024	Sokol Kazan (4)	1–1 (4–3 p)	Volna Nizhny Novgorod Oblast (4)	Kazan
16:00	Voronov 33'	Report	Lukoyanov 21'	Stadium: Trudovye Rezervy Stadium; Attendance: 330; Referee: Vladislav Demyanchuk
	Penalties
	Gallyamov (penalty scored); Gilmutdinov (penalty missed); Shcherbin (penalty scored); Gorelov (penalty scored); Yakovlev (penalty scored)		(penalty missed) Saygushev; (penalty scored) Gaganin; (penalty scored) Khramov; (penalty scored) Sokolov; (penalty missed) Shamaev

1 August 2024	ZOV Moscow (5)	2–3	Torpedo Vladimir (4)	Moscow
17:45	Romanov 21'; Zyukin 82' (pen.)	Report	Khokhlov 15'; Zharov 59', 86'	Stadium: Oktyabr Stadium; Attendance: 100; Referee: Artem Klyuev

1 August 2024	Amkal Moscow (7)	8–1	Kolomna (4)	Moscow
18:00	Kostyukov 12', 41', 44'; Mavrin 18'; Pichugin 33'; Imayev 47'; Agekyan 55', 69'	Report	Teterkin 65'	Stadium: Spartak Academy Stadium; Attendance: 1,370; Referee: Oleg Gusakov

1 August 2024	Kirovets-Voskhozhdeniye Saint Petersburg (6)	0–2	Tver (4)	Saint Petersburg
19:00		Report	Chugunov 54'; Shavel 86'	Stadium: Kirovets Stadium; Attendance: 208; Referee: Alina Vakhrusheva

=== Round 2 ===
Entered clubs:

- 17 winners of Round 1
- 21 highest clubs from Russian Second League Division B
- 18 clubs from Russian Second League Division A

Date of matches was determined on 9 August 2024.

20 August 2024	Uralets-TS Nizhny Tagil (4)	1–1 (4–5 p)	Amkar Perm (4)	Nizhny Tagil
15:00 (17:00 YEKT)	Podbeltsev 45'	Report	Akhatov 21'	Stadium: Sputnik Stadium; Attendance: 310; Referee: Andrey Strelkov
	Penalties
	Chuvilov (penalty scored); Yusupov (penalty scored); Kadermetov (penalty scored); Makarov (penalty scored); Mosunov (penalty missed); Drozhalkin (penalty missed)		(penalty scored) Stepanov; (penalty scored) Akhatov; (penalty scored) Burykin; (penalty missed) Sharov; (penalty scored) Tolkachev; (penalty scored) Pridyuk

20 August 2024	Biolog-Novokubansk (4)	0–2	Mashuk-KMV Pyatigorsk (3)	Yessentuki
16:00		Report	Tlekhugov 38'; Kuskov 61'	Stadium: Essentuki Arena; Attendance: 203; Referee: Anton Sidorin

20 August 2024	Spartak Nalchik (4)	0–1	Dynamo Stavropol (4)	Nalchik
16:30		Report	Zarochentsev 39'	Stadium: Spartak Stadium; Attendance: 350; Referee: Aleksandr Samsonov

20 August 2024	Stroitel Kamensk-Shakhtinsky (4)	2–5	Forte Taganrog (4)	Abramovka
17:00	Titarenko 66' (pen.), 90+1'	Report	Abakarov 11' (pen.); Melekestsev 31', 73'; Kanaev 40'; Amiraliev 80'	Stadium: Novocolor Arena; Attendance: 443; Referee: Andrey Zubov

20 August 2024	Veles Moscow (3)	0–2	Amkal Moscow (7)	Domodedovo
19:30		Report	Mavrin 31'; Kostyukov 56'	Stadium: Avangard Stadium; Attendance: 3,927; Referee: Andrey Prokopov

21 August 2024	Irtysh Omsk (3)	1–1 (6–7 p)	Chelyabinsk (3)	Domodedovo
13:00 (16:00 OMST)	Lobanov 27'	Report	Goldobin 7'	Stadium: Avangard Stadium; Attendance: 73; Referee: Emir Privalov
	Penalties
	Geryugov (penalty scored); Shleyermakher (penalty scored); Galadzhan (penalty scored); Ivankov (penalty scored); Dorofeyev (penalty scored); Sadykov (penalty scored); Karev (penalty missed)		(penalty scored) Goldobin; (penalty scored) Samsonov; (penalty scored) Pomerko; (penalty scored) Pokotylo; (penalty scored) Nosov; (penalty scored) Gruznov; (penalty scored) Levin

21 August 2024	Salyut Belgorod (4)	4–2	Spartak Tambov (4)	Stary Oskol
15:00	Krikunenko 75'; Matvevnin 80' (pen.); Viznovich 86'; Gordeev 90'		Kirichenko 34'; Popovich 90+2'	Stadium: Stary Oskol Stadium; Attendance: 0 (Note: Due to the complicated situation in the Belgorod region, Salyut will played this match in Stary Oskol without spectators.); Referee: Yuliya Veselova

21 August 2024	Sibir Novosibirsk (3)	4–3	Temp Barnaul (5)	Novosibirsk
15:00 (19:00 KRAT)	Rozhkov 35', 90+3'; Papikyan 45'; Bakharev 88'	Report	Babich 15'; Novichkov 61'; Zavyalov 71'	Stadium: Spartak Stadium; Attendance: 1,472; Referee: Vage Chichilyan

21 August 2024	Lada-Tolyatti (4)	0–2	Volga Ulyanovsk (3)	Syzran
15:00 (16:00 SAMT)		Report	Solodarenko 37'; Kamenshchikov 60'	Stadium: Kristall Stadium; Attendance: 248; Referee: Danil Tkachenko

21 August 2024	Torpedo Miass (3)	1–0	Nosta Novotroitsk (4)	Miass
16:00 (18:00 YEKT)	Kazimir 75'	Report		Stadium: Trud Stadium; Attendance: 300; Referee: Vladimir Sivkov

21 August 2024	Astrakhan (4)	2–1	Legion Makhachkala (4)	Astrakhan
16:00 (17:00 SAMT)	Solomatin 44', 56'	Report	Olenev 86'	Stadium: Aleksandr Kolosov Stadium; Attendance: 800; Referee: Oleg Gusakov

21 August 2024	Dynamo Kirov (4)	3–2	Sokol Kazan (4)	Kirov
16:00	Shmarov 23'; Bochko 52'; Goryushkin 65'	Report	Yakovlev 19', 39'	Stadium: VyatSShOR Stadium; Attendance: 1,020; Referee: Maksim Bogdanavichus

21 August 2024	Dynamo Vladivostok (4)	1–0	Irkutsk (4)	Odintsovo
16:00	Rashchupkin 14'	Report		Stadium: Central Stadium; Attendance: 97; Referee: Maksim Sukhanov

21 August 2024	Dynamo Saint Petersburg (4)	1–2	Kompozit Pavlovsky Posad (4)	Saint-Petersburg
16:00	Shilov 45'	Report	Tyumentsev 24' (pen.); Kukushkin 90+2'	Stadium: Nova Arena Stadium; Attendance: 355; Referee: Alina Vakhrusheva

21 August 2024	Kuban Krasnodar (3)	0–5	Kuban-Holding Pavlovskaya (4)	Pavlovskaya
17:00		Report	Zakharov 6'; Maloletov 35', 63', 78'; Fadeev 90'	Stadium: Urozhay Stadium; Attendance: 550; Referee: Vitaliy Moldovan

21 August 2024	Leningradets Leningrad Oblast (3)	4–0	SSHOR 1-Kristall Saint Petersburg (5)	Roshchino
17:00	Kazakov 66'; Kaptilov 78'; Bachinsky 90'; Davidenko 90+2'	Report		Stadium: Roshchino Arena Stadium; Attendance: 464; Referee: Sergey Kolesnik

21 August 2024	Tver (4)	1–1 (2–4 p)	Znamya Truda Orekhovo-Zuyevo (4)	Tver
17:00	Chugunov 66'	Report	Shishkov 90+4'	Stadium: Yunost Stadium; Attendance: 420; Referee: Anastasia Varfolomeeva
	Penalties
	Anisimov (penalty missed); Kudrevatyi (penalty missed); Beganskiy (penalty scored); Frolov (penalty scored)		(penalty scored) Sentyurin; (penalty scored) Krasilshchikov; (penalty scored) Shishkov; (penalty scored) Vorobyov

21 August 2024	Chertanovo Moscow (4)	3–1	Leon Saturn Ramenskoye (4)	Moscow
18:00	Gatin 10'; Semenov 26'; Svetov 75'	Report	Lepekhin 59'	Stadium: Arena Chertanovo Stadium; Attendance: 330; Referee: Dmitriy Matveev

21 August 2024	Ryazan (4)	4–0	Dynamo Bryansk (3)	Ryazan
18:00	Ermolaev 7'; Aksenov 13'; Sychev 33'; Pavlenko 64'	Report		Stadium: Spartak Stadium; Attendance: 455; Referee: Pavel Lysenko

21 August 2024	Metallurg Lipetsk (3)	1–2	Zenit Penza (4)	Lipetsk
18:00	Glukhov 7'	Report	Terechev 78'; Konoplev 85'	Stadium: Metallurg Stadium; Attendance: 1,640; Referee: Yan Marushko

21 August 2024	Sakhalin Yuzhno-Sakhalinsk (4)	0–2	Kosmos Dolgoprudny (4)	Orekhovo-Zuyevo
18:00		Report	Bolshunov 60' (o.g.); Gunko 68'	Stadium: Znamya Truda Stadium; Attendance: 89; Referee: Matvey Novikov

21 August 2024	Torpedo Vladimir (4)	2–2 (4–5 p)	Murom (3)	Vladimir
18:00	Zemskov 2'; Krasilin 17'	Report	Aleksandrov 47'; Girayev 69'	Stadium: MSA Torpedo Stadium; Attendance: 2,349; Referee: Sergey Fedotov
	Penalties
	Zharov (penalty scored); Pestov (penalty scored); Nurullin (penalty missed); Perfilov (penalty scored); Radostev (penalty scored)		(penalty scored) Matsukatov; (penalty scored) Girayev; (penalty scored) Pershin; (penalty scored) Mikhailov; (penalty scored) Aleksandrov

21 August 2024	Volgar Astrakhan (3)	3–1	Pobeda Khasavyurt (4)	Astrakhan
18:00 (19:00 SAMT)	Tatarinov 49'; Zuykov 65'; Bakhtiyarov 73' (pen.)	Report	Krivdunov 41'	Stadium: Central Stadium; Attendance: 1,340; Referee: Matvey Zaika

21 August 2024	Avangard Kursk (3)	0–2	Oryol (4)	Oryol
18:30		Report	Borisov 52'; Tarasov 78'	Stadium: Central Stadium (Note: Due to the complicated situation in the Kursk region, Avangard will played this match in Oryol.); Attendance: 5,759; Referee: Pavel Shishkin

21 August 2024	Luki-Energiya Velikiye Luki (4)	2–1	Kaluga (3)	Velikiye Luki
18:30	Lukin 53'; Spodarets 90+3' (pen.)	Report	Agureyev 43'	Stadium: Ekspress Stadium; Attendance: 700; Referee: Dmitri Kraynov

21 August 2024	Spartak Kostroma (3)	1–0	2Drots Moscow (7)	Kostroma
19:30	Chursin 77' (pen.)	Report		Stadium: Aleksandr Golubev SSHOR Stadium; Attendance: 3,300; Referee: Oleg Snegirev

22 August 2024	Dynamo Vologda (4)	1–3	Tekstilshchik Ivanovo (3)	Vologda
16:30	Krivoruchko 41'	Report	Yeliseyev 45+3'; Skvortsov 86'; Azarov 88'	Stadium: Dynamo Stadium; Attendance: 1,927; Referee: Danila Tsurkov

22 August 2024	Khimik Dzerzhinsk (3)	1–0	Broke Boys (7)	Dzerzhinsk
19:30	Sergienko 8'	Report		Stadium: Khimik Stadium; Attendance: 3,505; Referee: Evgeniy Rubtsov

=== Round 3 ===
Entered clubs:

- 28 winners of Round 2

The draw for round 3 defining home and away team was held on 23 August 2024. The schedule of the third round was held on 26 August 2024

Times are MSK (UTC+3), as listed by RFU (local times, if different, are in parentheses).

3 September	Amkar Perm (4)	1–0	Torpedo Miass (3)	Perm
17:00 (19:00 YEKT)	Maltsev 62'	Report		Stadium: Zvezda Stadium; Attendance: 1,947; Referee: Vladislav Kharitonov

3 September	Forte Taganrog (4)	0–1	Kuban-Holding Pavlovskaya (4)	Taganrog
17:00		Report	Revazov 13' (pen.)	Stadium: Forte Arena Stadium; Attendance: 646; Referee: Andrey Strelkov

3 September	Tekstilshchik Ivanovo (3)	1–1 (3–4 p)	Spartak Kostroma (3)	Ivanovo
19:30	Yeliseyev 22'	Report	Kiselyov 67'	Stadium: Tekstilshchik Stadium; Attendance: 2,075; Referee: Anton Sidorin
	Penalties
	Samsonov (penalty scored); Razborov (penalty missed); Selemenev (penalty scored); Azarov (penalty scored); Ivakhnov (penalty missed); Kozlovskiy (penalty missed)		(penalty missed) Chursin; (penalty missed) Rubtsov; (penalty scored) Chikanchi; (penalty scored) Kiselyov; (penalty scored) Kulikov; (penalty scored) Nemchenko

4 September	Dynamo Vladivostok (4)	2–0	Sibir Novosibirsk (3)	Vladivostok
12:00 (19:00 VLAT)	Kuzin 25'; Kolotygin 36'	Report		Stadium: Dynamo Stadium; Attendance: 931; Referee: Danila Tsurkov

4 September	Kosmos Dolgoprudny (4)	1–2	Amkal Moscow (7)	Dolgoprudny
16:00	Pomeshkin 49'	Report	Pichugin 38' (pen.), 66' (pen.)	Stadium: Salut Stadium; Attendance: 1,500; Referee: Roman Marnavskiy

4 September	Chelyabinsk (3)	1–0	Chertanovo Moscow (4)	Chelyabinsk
17:00 (19:00 YEKT)	Gorbachik 50'	Report		Stadium: Central Stadium; Attendance: 2,936; Referee: Evgeniy Rubtsov

4 September	Volga Ulyanovsk (3)	7–0	Dynamo Kirov (4)	Ulyanovsk
17:00 (18:00 SAMT)	Rakhmanov 3'; Murza 14'; Kravtsov 21'; Bilalov 66', 69'; Zhironkin 78'; Polyakh 80'	Report		Stadium: Trud Stadium; Attendance: 1,130; Referee: Pavel Lysenko

4 September	Astrakhan (4)	1–2	Volgar Astrakhan (3)	Astrakhan
18:00 (19:00 SAMT)	Zlobin 88'	Report	Shcherbakov 51'; Lesnikov 90+5'	Stadium: Central Stadium; Attendance: 2,488; Referee: Mikhail Plisko

4 September	Mashuk-KMV Pyatigorsk (3)	1–0	Dynamo Stavropol (4)	Pyatigorsk
18:00	Suanov 29'	Report		Stadium: Central Stadium; Attendance: 950; Referee: Matvey Zaika

4 September	Murom (3)	2–2 (4–5 p)	Khimik Dzerzhinsk (3)	Murom
18:00	Girayev 80' (pen.); Kotik 85'	Report	Merenchukov 20'; Abramushkin 42' (pen.)	Stadium: Viktor Losev Stadium; Attendance: 1,500; Referee: Artem Smolin
	Penalties
	Girayev (penalty missed); Gerchikov (penalty scored); Vyskrebentsev (penalty scored); Kopylov (penalty scored); Matsukatov (penalty scored); Teplyakov (penalty missed)		(penalty scored) Sutugin; (penalty scored) Merenchukov; (penalty scored) Kotelnikov; (penalty scored) Abramushkin; (penalty missed) Markov; (penalty scored) Chubukin

4 September	Znamya Truda Orekhovo-Zuyevo (4)	2–0	Leningradets Leningrad Oblast (3)	Orekhovo-Zuyevo
18:00	Kuznetsov 66'; Veretennikov 90+3'	Report		Stadium: Znamya Truda Stadium; Attendance: 520; Referee: Vladimir Sivkov

4 September	Oryol (4)	4–2	Salyut Belgorod (4)	Oryol
18:30	Stavtsev 62'; Dmitriyev 75'; Merkulov 76', 82'	Report	Ponomarev 25'; Vinnikov 37'	Stadium: Central Stadium; Attendance: 4,137; Referee: Andrey Meshkov

5 September	Kompozit Pavlovsky Posad (4)	3–0	Zenit Penza (4)	Orekhovo-Zuyevo
18:00	Morev 28'; Agalakov 44'; Kubyshkin 45+1'	Report		Stadium: Znamya Truda Stadium; Attendance: 202; Referee: Evgeniy Timofeev

5 September	Luki-Energiya Velikiye Luki (4)	3–0	Ryazan (4)	Velikiye Luki
18:30	Agaronyan 45+3'; Spodarets 66'; Egorov 90+1'	Report		Stadium: Ekspress Stadium; Attendance: 1,250; Referee: Sergey Kolesnik

=== Round 4 ===
The draw was held on 8 September 2024 at 19:30 MSK live on TV-channel «Match Premier». Entered clubs:

- 14 winners of Round 3
- 18 clubs from Russian First League

On 6 September draw procedure was released, that consisted of 2 phases. On the first phase, 2 random balls with First League team from pot 2 was relocated to pot 1, then on the second phase usual draw procedure started. The teams from pot 1 played their matches in round 4 at home.

Pot 1	Pot 2
Amkal Moscow (7); Amkar Perm (4); Chelyabinsk (3); Dynamo Vladivostok (4); KAMAZ Naberezhnye Chelny (2); Khimik Dzerzhinsk (3); Kompozit Pavlovsky Posad (4); Kuban-Holding Pavlovskaya (4); Luki-Energiya Velikiye Luki (4); Mashuk-KMV Pyatigorsk (3); Oryol (4); Spartak Kostroma (3); Ural Yekaterinburg (2); Volga Ulyanovsk (3); Volgar Astrakhan (3); Znamya Truda Orekhovo-Zuyevo (4)	Alania Vladikavkaz (2); Arsenal Tula (2); Baltika Kaliningrad (2); Chayka Peschanokopskoye (2); Chernomorets Novorossiysk (2); KAMAZ Naberezhnye Chelny (2) → Pot 1; Neftekhimik Nizhnekamsk (2); Rodina Moscow (2); Rotor Volgograd (2); Shinnik Yaroslavl (2); SKA-Khabarovsk (2); Sochi (2); Sokol Saratov (2); Torpedo Moscow (2); Tyumen (2); Ufa (2); Ural Yekaterinburg (2) → Pot 1; Yenisey Krasnoyarsk (2)

The team from pot 2 that was relocated to pot 1 is written in italics. The team was unknown until it will be drawn from pot 1.

Times are MSK (UTC+3), as listed by RFU (local times, if different, are in parentheses).

24 September 2024	Kuban-Holding Pavlovskaya (4)	0–5	Sochi (2)	Pavloskaya
14:00		Report	Melyoshin 39', 78'; Bart 56', 64'; Safronov 70'	Stadium: Urozhay Stadium; Attendance: 1,800; Referee: Andrey Prokopov

24 September 2024	Amkar Perm (4)	3–3 (4–3 p)	Chernomorets Novorossiysk (2)	Perm
17:00 (19:00 YEKT)	Promoshkin 2'; Dibirgadzhiyev 24', 36'	Report	Rodionov 17'; Bocharov 86' (o.g.); Fomin 88'	Stadium: Zvezda Stadium; Attendance: 2,500; Referee: Aleksandr Mayun
	Penalties
	Stepanov (penalty scored); Kolesnichenko (penalty scored); Burykin (penalty scored); Akhatov (penalty missed); Pridyuk (penalty scored)		(penalty scored) Uridia; (penalty scored) Rodionov; (penalty scored) Cherov; (penalty missed) Nikiforov; (penalty missed) Ivanov

24 September 2024	Chelyabinsk (3)	0–2	Tyumen (2)	Chelyabinsk
17:00 (19:00 YEKT)		Report	Tkachuk 45'; Mokayev 90+3'	Stadium: Central Stadium; Attendance: 3,150; Referee: Kirill Silantjev

24 September 2024	Volga Ulyanovsk (3)	1–1 (4–3 p)	Rotor Volgograd (2)	Ulyanovsk
19:30 (20:30 SAMT)	Kamenshchikov 26'	Report	Ageyev 56'	Stadium: Trud Stadium; Attendance: 2,455; Referee: Yaroslav Khromey
	Penalties
	Chupin (penalty scored); Maksimenkov (penalty missed); Murza (penalty scored); Novikov (penalty scored); Minayev (penalty scored)		(penalty scored) Morozov; (penalty scored) Kasimov; (penalty scored) Kukharchuk; (penalty missed) Semyonov; (penalty missed) Talikin

25 September 2024	Dynamo Vladivostok (4)	0–0 (2–3 p)	Shinnik Yaroslavl (2)	Vladivostok
12:00 (19:00 VLAT)		Report		Stadium: Dynamo Stadium; Attendance: 1,035; Referee: Anton Sidorin
	Penalties
	Zyryanov (penalty missed); Dudkin (penalty missed); Salnikov (penalty missed); Rashchupkin (penalty scored); Mingazov (penalty scored)		(penalty missed) Zinkov; (penalty scored) Kul; (penalty missed) Sultonov; (penalty scored) Fyodorov; (penalty scored) Sukhomlinov

25 September 2024	Mashuk-KMV Pyatigorsk (3)	0–3	Rodina Moscow (2)	Yessentuki
16:00		Report	Antonov 17'; Abdusalamov 53'; Kochiyev 60'	Stadium: Essentuki Arena; Attendance: 544; Referee: Evgeni Galimov

25 September 2024	Ural Yekaterinburg (2)	1–0	SKA-Khabarovsk (2)	Yekaterinburg
17:00 (19:00 YEKT)	Mosin 8'	Report		Stadium: Yekaterinburg Arena Stadium; Attendance: 6,446; Referee: Aleksandr Mashlyakevich

25 September 2024	Volgar Astrakhan (3)	1–1 (4–5 p)	Ufa (2)	Astrakhan
18:00 (19:00 SAMT)	Karpov 87' (o.g.)	Report	Lesnikov 90+3' (o.g.)	Stadium: Central Stadium; Attendance: 2,087; Referee: Maksim Perezva
	Penalties
	Lesnikov (penalty scored); Pavlishin (penalty scored); Druzhinin (penalty missed); Anosov (penalty scored); Volkov (penalty scored)		(penalty scored) Matskharashvili; (penalty scored) Tenyayev; (penalty scored) Pasevich; (penalty scored) Kornyushin; (penalty scored) Perchenok

25 September 2024	Oryol (4)	2–3	Sokol Saratov (2)	Oryol
18:30	Khmelevskoy 50'; Dmitriyev 72'	Report	Samko 14'; Shpitalny 28', 63'	Stadium: Central Stadium; Attendance: 7,861; Referee: Danil Kashirin

25 September 2024	Luki-Energiya Velikiye Luki (4)	1–1 (1–3 p)	Baltika Kaliningrad (2)	Velikiye Luki
18:30	Spodarets 16' (pen.)	Report	Fernandes 18'	Stadium: Ekspress Stadium; Attendance: 2,236; Referee: Mikhail Plisko
	Penalties
	Spodarets (penalty missed); Polyakov (penalty missed); Mayboroda (penalty scored); Butakov (penalty missed)		(penalty scored) Nikishin; (penalty scored) Stefanovich; (penalty scored) Zazvonkin

25 September 2024	Kompozit Pavlovsky Posad (4)	0–0 (4–2 p)	Neftekhimik Nizhnekamsk (2)	Orekhovo-Zuyevo
19:00				Stadium: Znamya Truda Stadium; Attendance: 346; Referee: Maksim Skorochkin
	Penalties
	Ionov (penalty scored); Lebedev (penalty scored); Morev (penalty scored); Peshcherov (penalty scored)		(penalty missed) Petrov; (penalty scored) Sitdikov; (penalty scored) Pershin; (penalty missed) Sharifullin

25 September 2024	Khimik Dzerzhinsk (3)	0–3	Chayka Peschanokopskoye (2)	Dzerzhinsk
19:00		Report	Mikhaylenko 32' (o.g.); Khokhlachyov 38'; Nikolayev 90+2'	Stadium: Khimik Stadium; Attendance: 1,800; Referee: Stanislav Matveev

25 September 2024	KAMAZ Naberezhnye Chelny (2)	1–2	Torpedo Moscow (2)	Naberezhnye Chelny
19:30	Abdullayev 59'	Report	Kolodin 35'; Shitov 51'	Stadium: KAMAZ Stadium; Attendance: 1,212; Referee: Inal Tanashev

26 September 2024	Spartak Kostroma (3)	1–0	Yenisey Krasnoyarsk (2)	Kostroma
17:00	Kiselyov 6'	Report		Stadium: Aleksandr Golubev SSHOR Stadium; Attendance: 1,965; Referee: Vladislav Tselovalnikov

26 September 2024	Znamya Truda Orekhovo-Zuyevo (4)	1–1 (4–3 p)	Arsenal Tula (2)	Orekhovo-Zuevo
18:00	Kuznetsov 25'	Report	Turishchev 11'	Stadium: Znamya Truda Stadium; Attendance: 1,300; Referee: Nikita Novikov
	Penalties
	Sentyurin (penalty scored); Shishkov (penalty scored); Kuznetsov (penalty scored); Vorobyov (penalty missed); Urkhov (penalty scored)		(penalty scored) Dmitriyev; (penalty scored) Korotkov; (penalty missed) Shevchenko; (penalty missed) Zhilkin; (penalty scored) Pechyonkin

26 September 2024	Amkal Moscow (7)	0–1	Alania Vladikavkaz (2)	Moscow
19:30		Report	Abdokov 11'	Stadium: Spartak Academy Stadium; Attendance: 1,800; Referee: Vladimir Falov

=== Round 5 ===
The draw was held on 27 September 2023 at 15:00 MSK live on TV-channel «Match Premier».
Entered clubs:

- 16 winners of Round 4

15 October 2024	Amkar Perm (4)	1–0	Kompozit Pavlovsky Posad (4)	Perm
17:00 (19:00 YEKT)	Dibirgadzhiyev 41'	Report		Stadium: Zvezda Stadium; Attendance: 2,517; Referee: Andrey Prokopov

15 October 2024	Ufa (2)	0–1	Shinnik Yaroslavl (2)	Ufa
17:00 (19:00 YEKT)		Report	Zhamaletdinov 53'	Stadium: Neftyanik Stadium; Attendance: 940; Referee: Igor Zakharov

15 October 2024	Sokol Saratov (2)	1–3	Ural Yekaterinburg (2)	Saratov
19:30 (20:30 SAMT)	Maksimenko 82'	Report	Porokhov 3'; Ishkov 30'; Ayupov 55'	Stadium: Lokomotiv Stadium; Attendance: 1,380; Referee: Anatoliy Zhabchenko

16 October 2024	Tyumen (2)	0–0 (4–3 p)	Alania Vladikavkaz (2)	Tyumen
17:00 (19:00 YEKT)		Report		Stadium: Geolog Stadium; Attendance: 1,580; Referee: Aleksey Lapatukhin
	Penalties
	Savinov (penalty scored); Poroykov (penalty missed); Karpov (penalty scored); Kenfack (penalty scored); Shavlokhov (penalty scored)		(penalty scored) Chochiyev; (penalty missed) Kokoyev; (penalty scored) Makarov; (penalty scored) Tarba; (penalty missed) Zaseyev

16 October 2024	Rodina Moscow (2)	1–2	Spartak Kostroma (3)	Moscow
17:00	Kalmykov 1'	Report	Saplinov 9'; Zhilmostnykh 50'	Stadium: Sapsan Arena; Attendance: 618

16 October 2024	Torpedo Moscow (2)	0–4	Baltika Kaliningrad (2)	Khimki
19:30		Report	Fernandes 19' (pen.), 50'; Stefanovich 37'; Zazvonkin 45+1'	Stadium: Arena Khimki; Attendance: 704; Referee: Evgeniy Galimov

16 October 2024	Sochi (2)	2–0	Volga Ulyanovsk (3)	Sochi
19:30	Solodarenko 33' (o.g.); Bart 89'	Report		Stadium: Fisht Stadium; Attendance: 2,695; Referee: Danil Kashirin

17 October 2024	Chayka Peschanokopskoye (2)	2–0	Znamya Truda Orekhovo-Zuyevo (4)	Peschanokopskoye
19:00	Ivashin 15'; Pelikh 81'	Report		Stadium: Central Stadium; Attendance: 567; Referee: Anton Sidorin

=== Round 6 ===
The draw was held on 18 October 2024 at 15:30 MSK live on TV-channel «Match Premier».
Entered clubs:

- 8 winners of Round 5

29 October 2024	Tyumen (2)	3–0	Amkar Perm (4)	Tyumen
17:30 (19:30 YEKT)	Kosarev 2'; Pridyuk 49' (o.g.); Maryanov 67'	Report		Stadium: Geolog Stadium; Attendance: 1,610; Referee: Konstantin Averyanov

29 October 2024	Baltika Kaliningrad (2)	0–1	Ural Yekaterinburg (2)	Kaliningrad
20:00 (19:00 KALT)		Report	Beveyev 48'	Stadium: Rostec Arena; Attendance: 9,154; Referee: Vladislav Tselovalnikov

30 October 2024	Shinnik Yaroslavl (2)	0–0 (4–2 p)	Chayka Peschanokopskoye (2)	Yaroslavl
17:45		Report		Stadium: Shinnik Stadium; Attendance: 1,864; Referee: Inal Tanashev

30 October 2024	Sochi (2)	2–2 (4–2 p)	Spartak Kostroma (3)	Sochi
20:00	Zhilmostnykh 17' (o.g.); Kravtsov 69'	Report	Sadov 47'; Rubtsov 90+1'	Stadium: Fisht Stadium; Attendance: 4,533; Referee: Oleg Sokolov

== Group stage (RPL path) ==
The draw for group stage was held on 10 June 2024 live on TV-channel «Match TV».

16 teams of the Russian Premier League (RPL) will start the tournament from the group stage (4 teams in each group). The teams will play 6 matches in the group stage:

- 1st day — 30 July – 1 August;
- 2nd day — 13–15 August;
- 3rd day — 27–29 August;
- 4th day — 17–19 September;
- 5th day — 1–3 October;
- 6th day — 22–24 October.

Pot 1	Pot 2	Pot 3	Pot 4
Zenit Saint Petersburg; Krasnodar; Dynamo Moscow; Lokomotiv Moscow	Spartak Moscow; CSKA Moscow; Rostov; Rubin Kazan	Krylia Sovetov Samara; Akhmat Grozny; Fakel Voronezh; Orenburg	Pari Nizhny Novgorod; Akron Tolyatti; Khimki; Dynamo Makhachkala

Composition of the pots is based on results of the 2023–24 Russian Premier League and 2023–24 Russian First League. In the same group there can't be more than 2 teams from Moscow, also FC Krasnodar, FC Rostov and Fakel Voronezh can't be in the same group due to logistics restrictions in this cities.

Times are MSK (UTC+3), as listed by RFU (local times, if different, are in parentheses).

=== Group A ===
Pos	Team	Pld	W	PW	PL	L	GF	GA	GD	Pts	Qualification	SPA	DMO	DMA	KRY
1	Spartak Moscow	6	5	0	0	1	14	4	+10	15	Qualification to the Knockout phase (RPL path)	—	3–0	0–1	4–1
2	Dynamo Moscow	6	3	1	0	2	17	13	+4	11	Qualification to the Knockout phase (RPL path)	2–3	—	2–1	5–1
3	Dynamo Makhachkala	6	2	0	2	2	8	8	0	8	Qualification to the Knockout phase (regions path)	0–1	2–2 (Note: Dynamo Moscow won 5–3 on penalties.)	—	1–0
4	Krylia Sovetov Samara	6	0	1	0	5	8	22	−14	2		0–3	3–6	3–3 (Note: Krylya Sovetov won 5–3 on penalties.)	—

Source: Russian Football Union (in Russian), Soccerway
Rules for classification: 1) Points; 2) Head-to-head points; 3) Head-to-head matches won; 4) Head-to-head goal difference; 5) Head-to-head goals scored; 6) Matches won; 7) Goal difference; 8) Goals scored; 9) Penalty shoot-out goal difference; 10) Draw.
Notes:

31 July 2024 Matchday 1	Spartak Moscow	3–0	Dynamo Moscow	Moscow
18:30	Ugalde 37'; Selikhov (yellow card) 64'; Medina 68' (pen.); Maslov 75' (yellow card) 90+2'	Report	Lepsky (yellow card) 40'; Kutitsky (yellow card) 50'; Ngamaleu (yellow card) 67'; Majstorović (yellow card) 90+3'	Stadium: Lukoil Arena; Attendance: 20,431; Referee: Vladimir Moskalyov

1 August 2024 Matchday 1	Dynamo Makhachkala	1–0	Krylia Sovetov Samara	Kaspiysk
19:30	Gadzhiyev 83' (yellow card) 90+5'	Report	Vladimir Pisarsky (Sychevoy) (yellow card) 40'	Stadium: Anzhi Arena; Attendance: 10,027; Referee: Sergey Tsyganok

14 August 2024 Matchday 2	Dynamo Moscow	2–1	Dynamo Makhachkala	Moscow
19:30	Makarov (yellow card) 42'; Carrascal 54' (pen.) (yellow card) 62'; Gladyshev 75'	Report	Gadzhiyev 44'	Stadium: VTB Arena; Attendance: 12,105; Referee: Yegor Yegorov

14 August 2024 Matchday 2	Krylia Sovetov Samara	0–3	Spartak Moscow	Samara
19:30 (20:30 SAMT)	Yevgenyev (yellow card) 14'; Costanza (yellow card) 73'	Report	Litvinov (yellow card) 28'; Maslov (yellow card) 30'; Martins 64'; Medina 83'; Zorin 90+3'	Stadium: Solidarnost Samara Arena; Attendance: 20,040; Referee: Ivan Abrosimov

27 August 2024 Matchday 3	Spartak Moscow	0–1	Dynamo Makhachkala	Moscow
19:30	Zobnin (yellow card) 16'; Ugalde (yellow card) 90'; Abena (yellow card) 90+4'	Report	Agalarov 14' (pen.); Mrezigue (yellow card) 30'; Gadzhiyev (yellow card) 44'; Sundukov (yellow card) 61'; Paltsev (yellow card) 90'; Volk (yellow card) 90+2'	Stadium: Lukoil Arena; Attendance: 19,419; Referee: Aleksandr Mashlyakevich

28 August 2024 Matchday 3	Dynamo Moscow	5–1	Krylia Sovetov Samara	Moscow
19:30	Bokov 9'; Okishor 21', 45+1'; Fernández (yellow card) 56'; Gladyshev 58'; Makarov 83'	Report	Costanza 42' (pen.)	Stadium: VTB Arena; Attendance: 12,515; Referee: Evgeniy Bulanov

18 September 2024 Matchday 4	Dynamo Makhachkala	2–2 (3–5 p)	Dynamo Moscow	Kaspiysk
21:15	Serderov 40'; Agalarov 67'	Report	Fomin 34'; Arthur 37'; Skopintsev (yellow card) 61'; Fernández (yellow card) 77'; Aleksandrov (yellow card) 90'	Stadium: Anzhi Arena; Attendance: 13,781; Referee: Ivan Abrosimov
	Penalties
	Agalarov (penalty scored); Magomedov (penalty scored); Glushkov (penalty missed); Yusupov (penalty scored)		(penalty scored) Fomin; (penalty scored) Gladyshev; (penalty scored) El Maouhoub; (penalty scored) Carrascal; (penalty scored) Bitello

19 September 2024 Matchday 4	Spartak Moscow	4–1	Krylia Sovetov Samara	Moscow
20:45	Nicholson 2'; Zobnin 19'; Khlusevich (yellow card) 24'; Marquinhos (yellow card) 24'; Pyachenin 41' (o.g.); Stanković (manager) (yellow card) 87'; Mangas 89'	Report	Pyachenin (yellow card) 34' (yellow-red card) 86'; Shitov 68'; Costanza (yellow card) 70'	Stadium: Lukoil Arena; Attendance: 13,014; Referee: Roman Safyan

2 October 2024 Matchday 5	Dynamo Moscow	2–3	Spartak Moscow	Moscow
19:00	Dasa 2'; Maouhoub (yellow card) 17' (goal) 20'; Balbuena (yellow card) 90'; Kutitsky (yellow card) 90+7'	Report	Barco 10' (pen.); Khlusevich (yellow card) 19'; Litvinov (yellow card) 56'; Martins 84'; Stanković (manager) (yellow card) 87' (yellow-red card) 87'; Willian 90'	Stadium: VTB Arena; Attendance: 22,035; Referee: Vitali Meshkov

2 October 2024 Matchday 5	Krylia Sovetov Samara	3–3 (5–3 p)	Dynamo Makhachkala	Samara
19:00 (20:00 SAMT)	Babayev 1', 44'; Tsypchenko 11'	Report	Paltsev (yellow card) 49'; Agalarov 57', 66'; Gadzhiyev (yellow card) 85' (goal) 90+2'	Stadium: Solidarnost Samara Arena; Attendance: 5,092; Referee: Mikhail Cheremnykh
	Penalties
	Sergeyev (penalty scored); Garré (penalty scored); Oleynikov (penalty scored); Méndez (penalty scored); Dmitriyev (penalty scored)		(penalty scored) Agalarov; (penalty missed) Gadzhiyev; (penalty scored) Yusupov; (penalty scored) Paltsev

22 October 2024 Matchday 6	Dynamo Makhachkala	0–1	Spartak Moscow	Kaspiysk
18:30	Kirsh (red card) 37'; Kagermazov (yellow card) 90'	Report	Zorin 49' (yellow card) 53' (yellow-red card) 85'; Mangas (yellow card) 75'	Stadium: Anzhi Arena; Attendance: 10,032; Referee: Pavel Shadykhanov

24 October 2024 Matchday 6	Krylia Sovetov Samara	3–6	Dynamo Moscow	Samara
19:00 (20:00 SAMT)	Garré 14' (pen.); Galdames 17'; Gaponov 77'	Report	Gladyshev 9'; Maouhoub 16', 53', 82' (yellow card) 85'; Gagnidze 27' (yellow card) 68'; Makarov 51'; Lepsky (yellow card) 64'; Nazarenko (yellow card) 88'	Stadium: Solidarnost Samara Arena; Attendance: 5,086; Referee: Yan Bobrovskiy

=== Group B ===
Pos	Team	Pld	W	PW	PL	L	GF	GA	GD	Pts	Qualification	LOK	ROS	KHI	ORE
1	Lokomotiv Moscow	6	5	1	0	0	17	6	+11	17	Qualification to the Knockout phase (RPL path)	—	1–0	4–0	2–1
2	Rostov	6	3	0	2	1	11	7	+4	11	Qualification to the Knockout phase (RPL path)	2–2 (Note: Lokomotiv Moscow won 8–7 on penalties.)	—	3–1	3–1
3	Khimki	6	1	1	0	4	5	16	−11	5	Qualification to the Knockout phase (regions path)	1–5	2–2 (Note: Khimki won 8–7 on penalties.)	—	1–0
4	Orenburg	6	1	0	0	5	6	10	−4	3		2–3	0–1	2–0	—

Source: Russian Football Union (in Russian), Soccerway
Rules for classification: 1) Points; 2) Head-to-head points; 3) Head-to-head matches won; 4) Head-to-head goal difference; 5) Head-to-head goals scored; 6) Matches won; 7) Goal difference; 8) Goals scored; 9) Penalty shoot-out goal difference; 10) Draw.
Notes:

30 July 2024 Matchday 1	Lokomotiv Moscow	1–0	Rostov	Moscow
18:30	Karpukas (yellow card) 11'; Rakov 78'	Report	Melyokhin (yellow card) 10'	Stadium: RZD Arena; Attendance: 11,250; Referee: Ranel Ziyakov

31 July 2024 Matchday 1	Khimki	1–0	Orenburg	Khimki
16:00	Abdullahi (yellow card) 48'; Magomedov 90'	Report	Zotov (yellow card) 86'	Stadium: Arena Khimki; Attendance: 1,186; Referee: Mikhail Cheremnykh

13 August 2024 Matchday 2	Orenburg	2–3	Lokomotiv Moscow	Orenburg
17:30 (19:30 YEKT)	Cuero 16' (pen.), 53' (yellow card) 74'; Prokhin (yellow card) 85'; Kasimov (yellow card) 90+4'	Report	Suleymanov 8' (pen.), 36'; Pogostnov (yellow card) 19'; Nenakhov (yellow card) 45+3'; Rakov (yellow card) 77' (goal) 82'	Stadium: Gazovik Stadium; Attendance: 5,294; Referee: Evgeniy Bulanov

13 August 2024 Matchday 2	Rostov	3–1	Khimki	Rostov-on-Don
20:00	Kuchayev 8'; Melyokhin (yellow card) 12'; Bayramyan (yellow card) 25'; Ronaldo 38'; Sako (yellow card) 85'; Golenkov (yellow card) 85' (goal) 88'	Report	Khosonov (yellow card) 28'; Zabolotny (yellow card) 43'; Bakayev 45+2'; Mirzov (yellow card) 85'	Stadium: Rostov Arena; Attendance: 14,352; Referee: Roman Safyan

28 August 2024 Matchday 3	Orenburg	0–1	Rostov	Orenburg
15:00 (17:00 YEKT)	Prokhin (yellow card) 66'; Pérez (yellow card) 87'	Report	Ignatov (yellow card) 39'; Golenkov 83'; Utkin (yellow card) 87'	Stadium: Gazovik Stadium; Attendance: 3,650; Referee: Evgeni Kukulyak

28 August 2024 Matchday 3	Lokomotiv Moscow	4–0	Khimki	Moscow
19:30	Pogostnov 4'; Suleymanov 43', 57'; Radikovsky 81'	Report	Terekhov (yellow card) 52'	Stadium: RZD Arena; Attendance: 12,011; Referee: Artem Lyubimov

18 September 2024 Matchday 4	Rostov	3–1	Orenburg	Rostov-on-Don
19:00	Golenkov 35'; Sutormin 62'; Ignatov (yellow card) 77'; Ronaldo 86'	Report	Marín 14' (pen.); Muro (yellow card) 16'; Khotulyov (yellow card) 67'	Stadium: Rostov Arena; Attendance: 24,010; Referee: Yan Bobrovskiy

19 September 2024 Matchday 4	Khimki	1–5	Lokomotiv Moscow	Khimki
18:30	Terekhov (yellow card) 69'; Fariña (yellow card) 74' (yellow-red card) 90+1'; Bakayev 90'	Report	Timofeev (yellow card) 41'; Suleymanov 48', 70' (pen.); Montes 52'; Pinyayev 62', 63'; Tiknizyan (yellow card) 74'	Stadium: Arena Khimki; Attendance: 2,950; Referee: Mikhail Cheremnykh

1 October 2024 Matchday 5	Lokomotiv Moscow	2–1	Orenburg	Moscow
18:30	Pinyayev 9', 55'; Tiknizyan (yellow card) 11'	Report	Oganesyan (yellow card) 46'; Saharkhizan 65'; Bašić (yellow card) 89'	Stadium: RZD Arena; Attendance: 8,294; Referee: Aleksandr Mashlyakevich

2 October 2024 Matchday 5	Khimki	2–2 (8–7 p)	Rostov	Khimki
16:15	Rudenko 81' (yellow card) 90+4'; Melentijević 88' (yellow card) 90+4'	Report	Langovich 44'; Sako (yellow card) 56'; Mohebi (yellow card) 69' (goal) 76'; Karpin (manager) (yellow card) 84'	Stadium: Arena Khimki; Attendance: 1,307; Referee: Evgeniy Bulanov
	Penalties
	Panchenko (penalty scored); Mejía (penalty scored); Rudenko (penalty scored); Zabolotny (penalty missed); Mirzov (penalty scored); Abdullahi (penalty scored); Fernández (penalty scored); Stepanov (penalty scored); Melentijević (penalty scored)		(penalty scored) Komlichenko; (penalty scored) Sako; (penalty missed) Komarov; (penalty scored) Langovich; (penalty scored) Mohebi; (penalty scored) Kuchayev; (penalty scored) Shchetinin; (penalty scored) Shantali; (penalty missed) Chernov

23 October 2024 Matchday 6	Orenburg	2–0	Khimki	Orenburg
16:30 (18:30 YEKT)	Mikhaylov 10'; Baranovsky 33'	Report	Stepanov (yellow card) 57'	Stadium: Gazovik Stadium; Attendance: 2,396; Referee: Vera Opeykina

23 October 2024 Matchday 6	Rostov	2–2 (7–8 p)	Lokomotiv Moscow	Rostov-on-Don
19:00	Saravia (yellow card) 16'; Komarov 19'; Sutormin (yellow card) 45' (goal) 90+3'	Report	Batrakov 16' (pen.); Morozov (yellow card) 40'; Nyamsi (yellow card) 90+1'; Sarveli 90+6'	Stadium: Rostov Arena; Attendance: 22,203; Referee: Yegor Yegorov
	Penalties
	Komlichenko (penalty scored); Sutormin (penalty missed); Osipenko (penalty scored); Ignatov (penalty scored); Mohebi (penalty scored); Langovich (penalty scored); Kuchayev (penalty scored); Shchetinin (penalty missed); Vakhaniya (penalty scored); Shantali (penalty missed)		(penalty scored) Suleymanov; (penalty missed) Silyanov; (penalty scored) Sarveli; (penalty scored) Nyamsi; (penalty scored) Rakov; (penalty scored) Morozov; (penalty scored) Timofeyev; (penalty missed) Nenakhov; (penalty scored) Samoshnikov; (penalty scored) Barinov

=== Group C ===
Pos	Team	Pld	W	PW	PL	L	GF	GA	GD	Pts	Qualification	CSK	AKH	KRA	PNN
1	CSKA Moscow	6	4	1	0	1	8	2	+6	14	Qualification to the Knockout phase (RPL path)	—	1–0	2–0	1–1 (Note: CSKA won 4–2 on penalties.)
2	Akhmat Grozny	6	3	0	0	3	9	6	+3	9 (Note: Goal difference in head-to-head games: Akhmat +2, Krasnodar -2 (3-0, 0-1))	Qualification to the Knockout phase (RPL path)	0–2	—	3–0	4–1
3	Krasnodar	6	3	0	0	3	4	7	−3	9	Qualification to the Knockout phase (regions path)	1–0	1–0	—	1–2
4	Pari Nizhny Novgorod	6	1	0	1	4	5	11	−6	4		0–2	1–2	0–1	—

Source: Russian Football Union (in Russian), Soccerway
Rules for classification: 1) Points; 2) Head-to-head points; 3) Head-to-head matches won; 4) Head-to-head goal difference; 5) Head-to-head goals scored; 6) Matches won; 7) Goal difference; 8) Goals scored; 9) Penalty shoot-out goal difference; 10) Draw.
Notes:

31 July 2024 Matchday 1	Akhmat Grozny	4–1	Pari Nizhny Novgorod	Grozny
21:00	Agalarov 26' (pen.); Shvets 42'; Berisha 55', 60' (yellow card) 87'	Report	Aleksandrov (yellow card) 25'; Gotsuk 40'; Mukhin (yellow card) 64'; Shnaptsev (yellow card) 74'; Vešner Tičić (yellow card) 77'	Stadium: Akhmat-Arena; Attendance: 4,635; Referee: Ivan Abrosimov

31 July 2024 Matchday 1	Krasnodar	1–0	CSKA Moscow	Krasnodar
21:00	Pina 52'; Batxi (yellow card) 55'; Olaza (yellow card) 90+2'	Report	Moisés (yellow card) 17'; Nikolić (yellow card) 28'; Bistrović (yellow card) 30'; Willyan (yellow card) 38'	Stadium: Krasnodar Stadium; Attendance: 23,155; Referee: Artem Lyubimov

14 August 2024 Matchday 2	CSKA Moscow	1–1 (4–2 p)	Pari Nizhny Novgorod	Moscow
17:15	Diveyev 60'; Moisés (yellow card) 90+3'	Report	Zé Turbo 32'; Kutateladze (yellow card) 44'; Aleksandrov (yellow card) 52'; Karapuzov (yellow card) 85'	Stadium: VEB Arena; Attendance: 9,062; Referee: Aleksandr Mashlyakevich
	Penalties
	Oblyakov (penalty scored); Diveyev (penalty scored); Krugovoy (penalty scored); Khellven (penalty scored)		(penalty scored) Ožegović; (penalty missed) Gotsuk; (penalty missed) Stamatov; (penalty scored) Aleksandrov

15 August 2024 Matchday 2	Krasnodar	1–0	Akhmat Grozny	Krasnodar
20:30	Olusegun (yellow card) 11'; Castaño (yellow card) 72'; Chernikov (yellow card) 78'; Zhirov 87' (o.g.); Musayev (yellow card) 90+2'; Batxi (yellow card) 90+6'	Report	Cardoso (yellow card) 52'; Šatara (yellow card) 90+5'; Sadulayev (yellow card) after match'	Stadium: Krasnodar Stadium; Attendance: 17,377; Referee: Vasily Kazartsev

27 August 2024 Matchday 3	Akhmat Grozny	0–2	CSKA Moscow	Grozny
17:15	Shvets (yellow card) 15'; Šatara (yellow card) 53'; Camilo (yellow card) 90+6'	Report	Bistrović (yellow card) 35'; Rocha (yellow card) 71'; Musayev 87'; Krugovoy 90+7'	Stadium: Akhmat-Arena; Attendance: 6,517; Referee: Egor Egorov

28 August 2024 Matchday 3	Pari Nizhny Novgorod	0–1	Krasnodar	Nizhny Novgorod
17:15	Glushchenkov (yellow card) 28'; Bozhenov (yellow card) 73'; Troshechkin (yellow card) 75'	Report	Tormena (yellow card) 28'; Kozlov 36'; Arutyunyan (yellow card) 68'; Castaño (yellow card) 80'	Stadium: Nizhny Novgorod Stadium; Attendance: 9,002; Referee: Artur Fedorov

18 September 2024 Matchday 4	CSKA Moscow	2–0	Krasnodar	Moscow
19:00	Gajić 32'; Torop (yellow card) 48'; Kislyak (yellow card) 58' (goal) 89'	Report	Tormena (yellow card) 24'; Pina (yellow card) 31'; González (yellow card) 90+3'	Stadium: VEB Arena; Attendance: 20,117; Referee: Sergey Cheban

19 September 2024 Matchday 4	Pari Nizhny Novgorod	1–2	Akhmat Grozny	Nizhny Novgorod
18:30	Gotsuk 28' (red card) 59'; Aleksandrov (yellow card) 45+1'; Kakkoyev (yellow card) 49'; Ilić (yellow card) 90'; Tsarukyan (yellow card) 90+1'	Report	Samorodov 10'; Lovat 59' (pen.); Talal (yellow card) 76'; Oparin (yellow card) 90'; Utsiyev (yellow card) 90+4'	Stadium: Nizhny Novgorod Stadium; Attendance: 7,821; Referee: Evgeniy Bulanov

1 October 2024 Matchday 5	Pari Nizhny Novgorod	0–2	CSKA Moscow	Nizhny Novgorod
20:45	Zé Turbo (yellow card) 27'	Report	Gajić (yellow card) 28'; Bistrović 49'; Glebov 62'	Stadium: Nizhny Novgorod Stadium; Attendance: 15,098; Referee: Sergey Tsyganok

2 October 2024 Matchday 5	Akhmat Grozny	3–0	Krasnodar	Grozny
21:15	Ghandri 19'; Ismael (yellow card) 30'; Kovachev 45+4'; Kamilov (yellow card) 49'; Talal 82'	Report	González (yellow card) 43'; Krivtsov (yellow card) 45+2'; Córdoba (red card) 77'	Stadium: Akhmat-Arena; Attendance: 6,723; Referee: Pavel Shadykhanov

22 October 2024 Matchday 6	CSKA Moscow	1–0	Akhmat Grozny	Moscow
20:45	Koïta 34' (yellow card) 49'; Bistrović (yellow card) 43'; Zdjelar (yellow card) 88'	Report	Shvets (yellow card) 24'	Stadium: VEB Arena; Attendance: 11,128; Referee: Vladimir Moskalyov

23 October 2024 Matchday 6	Krasnodar	1–2	Pari Nizhny Novgorod	Krasnodar
21:15	Castaño (yellow card) 32'; Spertsyan (yellow card) 76'; Olusegun 89'; Chernikov (yellow card) 90+2'	Report	Vedernikov (yellow card) 55'; Tsarukyan 61'; Bozhenov (yellow card) 81'; Lukyanov (yellow card) 82'; Karič 90+3'	Stadium: Krasnodar Stadium; Attendance: 16,177; Referee: Evgeni Kukulyak

=== Group D ===
Pos	Team	Pld	W	PW	PL	L	GF	GA	GD	Pts	Qualification	ZEN	RUB	AKR	FAK
1	Zenit Saint Petersburg	6	5	0	1	0	13	2	+11	16	Qualification to the Knockout phase (RPL path)	—	2–0	5–1	3–0
2	Rubin Kazan	6	3	0	0	3	7	4	+3	9	Qualification to the Knockout phase (RPL path)	0–1	—	4–0	0–1
3	Akron Tolyatti	6	2	1	0	3	6	12	−6	8	Qualification to the Knockout phase (regions path)	1–1 (Note: Akron won 5–4 on penalties.)	0–1	—	2–0
4	Fakel Voronezh	6	1	0	0	5	2	10	−8	3		0–1	0–2	1–2	—

Source: Russian Football Union (in Russian), Soccerway
Rules for classification: 1) Points; 2) Head-to-head points; 3) Head-to-head matches won; 4) Head-to-head goal difference; 5) Head-to-head goals scored; 6) Matches won; 7) Goal difference; 8) Goals scored; 9) Penalty shoot-out goal difference; 10) Draw.
Notes:

30 July 2024 Matchday 1	Rubin Kazan	4–0	Akron Tolyatti	Kazan
18:30	Kuznetsov 8'; Ivanov (yellow card) 10'; Rozhkov 48'; Jukić 74'; Iwu 81'	Report	Baranok (yellow card) 26'; Moskvichyov (yellow card) 47'	Stadium: Ak Bars Arena; Attendance: 7,140; Referee: Roman Safyan

30 July 2024 Matchday 1	Zenit Saint Petersburg	3–0	Fakel Voronezh	Saint Petersburg
21:00	Yerokhin 25'; Florencio (yellow card) 66'; Cherov 70' (o.g.); Isidor 84'	Report	Dziov (yellow card) 10'; Bagamaev (red card) 88'	Stadium: Gazprom Arena; Attendance: 27,927; Referee: Rafael Shafeev

14 August 2024 Matchday 2	Rubin Kazan	0–1	Zenit Saint Petersburg	Kazan
17:15	Ashurmatov (yellow card) 33'; Rakhmonaliev (yellow card) 83'; Ivanov (yellow card) 90'; Zotov (yellow card) 90'; Vujačić (yellow card) 90+3'	Report	Vasilyev 59'	Stadium: Ak Bars Arena; Attendance: 17,404; Referee: Mikhail Cheremnykh

15 August 2024 Matchday 2	Fakel Voronezh	1–2	Akron Tolyatti	Voronezh
18:00	Markov 5'	Report	Dmitriyev 10'; Paliyenko 70' (pen.)	Stadium: Fakel Stadium; Attendance: 0 (Note: Fakel will play Akron without spectators. This decision was made by the operational headquarters of the Voronezh region for security reasons.); Referee: Ranel Ziyakov

27 August 2024 Matchday 3	Akron Tolyatti	1–1 (5–4 p)	Zenit Saint Petersburg	Samara
17:15 (18:15 SAMT)	Esanov (yellow card) 48'; Timoshenko 54' (pen.); Khubulov (yellow card) 65'; Bakaev (yellow card) 73'	Report	Alip (yellow card) 37'; Vasilyev 45+2' (yellow card) 84'	Stadium: Solidarnost Samara Arena; Attendance: 4,834; Referee: Sergey Tsyganok
	Penalties
	Kuzmin (penalty scored); Bakaev (penalty scored); Timoshenko (penalty scored); Esanov (penalty scored); Khubulov (penalty scored)		(penalty scored) Mantuan; (penalty scored) Pedro; (penalty scored) Akhmetov; (penalty missed) Artur; (penalty scored) Claudinho

27 August 2024 Matchday 3	Fakel Voronezh	0–2	Rubin Kazan	Voronezh
19:30	Bryzgalov (yellow card) 47'; Moțpan (yellow card) 59'	Report	Kuznetsov 41'; Shabanhaxhaj 84'	Stadium: Fakel Stadium; Attendance: 7,090; Referee: Yuri Karpov

17 September 2024 Matchday 4	Zenit Saint Petersburg	2–0	Rubin Kazan	Saint Petersburg
20:00	Sobolev (yellow card) 4'; Mantuan 26'; Chistyakov 59'; Artur (yellow card) 89'	Report	Apshatsev (yellow card) 44'	Stadium: Gazprom Arena; Attendance: 30,140; Referee: Evgeni Kukulyak

18 September 2024 Matchday 4	Akron Tolyatti	2–0	Fakel Voronezh	Samara
16:15 (17:15 SAMT)	Khubulov 50' (yellow card) 55'; Gribov 63'	Report	Ivlev (yellow card) 22'; Mertens (yellow card) 90'	Stadium: Solidarnost Samara Arena; Attendance: 1,338; Referee: Vera Opeykina

1 October 2024 Matchday 5	Rubin Kazan	0–1	Fakel Voronezh	Kazan
16:15	Kuznetsov (yellow card) 36'; Čumić (yellow card) 78'	Report	Ilyin 19' (pen.); Bagateliya (yellow card) 30'; Senhadji (yellow card) 58'; Shchetinin (yellow card) 69'; Kvekveskiri (yellow card) 84'	Stadium: Ak Bars Arena; Attendance: 4,309; Referee: Yan Bobrovskiy

2 October 2024 Matchday 5	Zenit Saint Petersburg	5–1	Akron Tolyatti	Saint Petersburg
21:15	Yerokhin (yellow card) 2' (goal) 6'; Artur 13', 43'; Pedro (yellow card) 39'; Sobolev 61'; Mostovoy 87' (pen.)	Report	Bardybakhin (yellow card) 46' (red card) 80'; Esanov (yellow card) 79'; Moskvichyov 90+2'	Stadium: Gazprom Arena; Attendance: 21,777; Referee: Yegor Yegorov

22 October 2024 Matchday 6	Fakel Voronezh	0–1	Zenit Saint Petersburg	Voronezh
16:15	Masternoy (yellow card) 28'; Bryzgalov (yellow card) 90+5'	Report	Yerokhin 44'	Stadium: Fakel Stadium; Attendance: 7,154; Referee: Ivan Abrosimov

23 October 2024 Matchday 6	Akron Tolyatti	0–1	Rubin Kazan	Samara
19:00 (20:00 SAMT)	Pestryakov (yellow card) 27'; Khubulov (yellow card) 39'; Savichev (yellow card) 89'	Report	Shabanhaxhaj 8'; Rakhmonaliev (yellow card) 39'	Stadium: Solidarnost Samara Arena; Attendance: 1,050; Referee: Artem Lyubimov

== Knockout phase ==
In the knockout phase, as in the qualification, the teams will be divided into 2 paths (brackets).

The teams in RPL path (upper bracket) will play against each other over two legs on a home-and-away basis. The teams that will lose after 2 legs in RPL path, except for the path final, will have the second chance in the regions path.

The teams in the regions path (lower bracket) will play against each other in 1 match. Each round, except the path final, consists of 2 phases. In the quarter-finals first phase teams from the regions path qualification will play against the third placed team of RPL path group stage, then on the second stage they will play against RPL path quarter-finals loser. In the semi-finals first phase the teams play with winners of the previous round of the regions path, the second phase is the same as in quarter-finals.

Like the previous season, the team that loses in the final of the upper bracket is eliminated from the tournament and will not play in the final of the lower bracket, so the final of Regions path consists of only 1 stage.

The winners of both paths will play in super final.

RPL path Quarter-finals	RPL path Semi-finals	RPL path Final	Final
Spartak Moscow	0	1	1
Rostov	1	2	3
Rostov	0	0	0
Zenit Saint Petersburg	1	2	3
Zenit Saint Petersburg	3	2	5
Akhmat Grozny	0	1	1
Zenit Saint Petersburg	2	0	2 (3)
CSKA Moscow (p)	0	2	2 (4)
Rubin Kazan	0	0	0
CSKA Moscow	0	3	3
CSKA Moscow	2	0	2
Dynamo Moscow	1	0	1
Dynamo Moscow (p)	1	1	2 (4)
June 2025 – Moscow
Lokomotiv Moscow	2	0	2 (3)
CSKA Moscow	0 (4)
Rostov	0 (3)
Regions path Quarter-finals; Stage 1	Regions path Quarter-finals; Stage 2	Regions path Semi-finals; Stage 1	Regions path Semi-finals; Stage 2	Regions path Final
Dynamo Makhachkala	1
Lokomotiv Moscow	0
Sochi	1 (3)	Lokomotiv Moscow	2
Lokomotiv Moscow	2	Rostov	2
Dynamo Makhachkala (p)	1 (4)
Akhmat Grozny	1
Krasnodar	1
Rostov	2
Tyumen	3 (2)	Akhmat Grozny	2
Spartak Moscow	1
Krasnodar (p)	3 (4)
Akron Tolyatti	2
Spartak Moscow	2
Shinnik Yaroslavl	0	Spartak Moscow	3
Spartak Moscow	3	Dynamo Moscow	1
Akron Tolyatti	1
Ural Yekaterinburg	0
Ural Yekaterinburg	1
Ural Yekaterinburg (p)	1 (4)	Rubin Kazan	0
Khimki	1 (3)

=== Quarter-finals ===
Due do to calendar changes in this season (the matches of RPL path will held in November 2024), and with team from hard logistic travel, to form a schedule, the draw for RPL path was held on 8 September 2024 at 19:30 MSK live on TV-channel «Match Premier» (before end a group stage).

The draw will determine the grid for the quarter-finals of the RPL Path.

In the first round of the draw, two baskets are used: the first basket contains 4 balls with the names of the groups from the RPL Path group round (A-D). From the first basket, 2 balls are moved by blind draw to the second basket.

In the second round of the draw, balls are drawn alternately from the first and second baskets by blind lot, determining two pairs of groups (A-B and C-D, A-C and B-D, or A-D and B-C), in which clubs from one group (1st and 2nd places, respectively) will play clubs from the other corresponding group (2nd and 1st places, respectively) in the 1/4 finals of the upper bracket playoffs.

Finally, a draw is held to determine the host club in each pair.

Winners of regions path round 6 will play stage 1 matches of regions path at home as well.

RPL path
Pot 1	Pot 2
CSKA Moscow (1); Lokomotiv Moscow (1); Spartak Moscow (1); Zenit Saint Petersburg (1)	Rostov (1); Rubin Kazan (1); Dynamo Moscow (1); Akhmat Grozny (1)

Regions path
Pot 1	Pot 2
Shinnik Yaroslavl (2); Sochi (2); Tyumen (2); Ural Yekaterinburg (2)	Akron Tolyatti (1); Khimki (1); Dynamo Makhachkala (1); Krasnodar (1)

==== RPL path ====
Team 1	Agg.	Team 2	1st leg	2nd leg
Spartak Moscow	1–3	Rostov	0–1	1–2
Dynamo Moscow	2–2 (4–3 p)	Lokomotiv Moscow	1–2	1–0
Zenit Saint Petersburg	5–1	Akhmat Grozny	3–0	2–1
Rubin Kazan	0–3	CSKA Moscow	0–0	0–3

5 November 2024 RPL QF	Spartak Moscow	0–1	Rostov	Moscow
18:30	Litvinov (yellow card) 9'; Stanković (manager) (yellow card) 36'; Umyarov (yellow card) 70'; Reabciuk (red card) 86'	Report	Zhbanov (yellow card) 16'; Melyokhin (yellow card) 43'; Shchetinin (yellow card) 45+2'; Karpin (manager) (yellow card) 68'; Mohebi 71' (pen.); Komarov (yellow card) 90+3'	Stadium: Lukoil Arena; Attendance: 9,393; Referee: Vasiliy Kazartsev

27 November 2024 RPL QF	Rostov	2–1	Spartak Moscow	Rostov-on-Don
20:30	Golenkov 19'; Melyokhin 31'; Kuchayev (yellow card) 57'; Shchetinin (yellow card) 75'	Report	Zorin (yellow card) 41'; Stanković (manager) (yellow card) 52'; Martins 55'; Umyarov (yellow card) 85'; Marquinhos (yellow card) 90+2'	Stadium: Rostov Arena; Attendance: 26,990; Referee: Sergei Karasev

5 November 2024 RPL QF	Dynamo Moscow	1–2	Lokomotiv Moscow	Moscow
20:45	Maouhoub 28'; Grulyov (yellow card) 80'; Marichal (yellow card) 88'	Report	Montes 25'; Tiknizyan (yellow card) 44'; Nenakhov (yellow card) 45'; Pinyayev 52'; Samoshnikov (yellow card) 74'; Batrakov (yellow card) 82'	Stadium: VTB Arena; Attendance: 12,944; Referee: Vladimir Moskalyov

28 November 2024 RPL QF	Lokomotiv Moscow	0–1 (3–4 p)	Dynamo Moscow	Moscow
19:30	Morozov (yellow card) 44'; Nyamsi (yellow card) 63'; Vorobyov (yellow card) 87'; Lička (manager) (yellow card) 90+2'	Report	Ngamaleu (yellow card) 10'; Fernández (yellow card) 43'; Tyukavin 89'	Stadium: RZD Arena; Attendance: 13,540; Referee: Pavel Kukuyan
	Penalties
	Batrakov (penalty scored); Nyamsi (penalty missed); Vorobyov (penalty scored); Rakov (penalty missed); Morozov (penalty scored); Silyanov (penalty missed)		(penalty scored) Grulyov; (penalty missed) Tyukavin; (penalty scored) Arthur; (penalty scored) Ngamaleu; (penalty missed) Bitello; (penalty scored) Dasa

6 November 2024 RPL QF	Zenit Saint Petersburg	3–0	Akhmat Grozny	Saint Petersburg
20:45	Claudinho 20'; Chistyakov (yellow card) 41'; Cassierra 53'; Sobolev 88'	Report	Ismael (yellow card) 5'; Samorodov (yellow card) 84'	Stadium: Gazprom Arena; Attendance: 20,570; Referee: Evgeny Kukulyak

27 November 2024 RPL QF	Akhmat Grozny	1–2	Zenit Saint Petersburg	Grozny
18:15	Kamilov (yellow card) 32'; Cardoso (yellow card) 49'; Samorodov 90+1'	Report	Gondou 15'; Artur 72'	Stadium: Akhmat-Arena; Attendance: 5,648; Referee: Yegor Yegorov

6 November 2024 RPL QF	Rubin Kazan	0–0	CSKA Moscow	Kazan
18:30	Çuni (yellow card) 10'; Vujačić (yellow card) 35'; Teslenko (yellow card) 53'	Report	Zdjelar (yellow card) 17'; Krugovoy (yellow card) 42'; Khellven (yellow card) 90+1'	Stadium: Ak Bars Arena; Attendance: 14,070; Referee: Artem Chistyakov

26 November 2024 RPL QF	CSKA Moscow	3–0	Rubin Kazan	Moscow
20:30	Khellven 20' (yellow card) 88'; Fayzullaev 30'; Musayev 38'; Willyan (yellow card) 70'	Report	Shabanhaxhaj (yellow card) 59'	Stadium: VEB Arena; Attendance: 11,325; Referee: Sergey Ivanov

==== Regions path ====
The regions path stage 1 draw was held on 1 November 2024 at 16:30 MSK live on TV-channel «Match Premier». The regions path stage 2 draw was held on 30 November 2024 at 12:30 MSK live on TV-channel «Match Premier».

===== Stage 1 =====
26 November 2024 Regions QF 1	Tyumen (2)	3–3 (2–4 p)	Krasnodar (1)	Tyumen
16:00 (18:00 YEKT)	Poroykov (yellow card) 45+1' (goal) 57', 62'; Khramtsov (yellow card) 79'; Shavlokhov (yellow card) 82'; Tkachuk 87'	Report	Kozlov 22'; Smolov 39', 53'; Koksharov (yellow card) 86'	Stadium: Geolog Stadium; Attendance: 7,114; Referee: Ranel Ziyakov
	Penalties
	Kosarev (penalty missed); Klyonkin (penalty scored); Karpov (penalty missed); Khramtsov (penalty scored)		(penalty missed) Gazinsky; (penalty scored) Kozlov; (penalty scored) Kuchugura; (penalty scored) Koksharov; (penalty scored) Castaño

26 November 2024 Regions QF 1	Shinnik Yaroslavl (2)	0–1	Akron Tolyatti (1)	Yaroslavl
18:15	Yakushevich (yellow card) 57'; Kul (yellow card) 64'; Samoylov (red card) 89'	Report	Malakhov 1' (o.g.); Gribov (yellow card) 45'; Kuzmin (yellow card) 85'; Baranok (yellow card) 89'	Stadium: Shinnik Stadium; Attendance: 3,658; Referee: Artem Lyubimov

27 November 2024 Regions QF 1	Sochi (2)	1–1 (3–4 p)	Dynamo Makhachkala (1)	Sochi
18:15	Shushenachev 45'; Suslov (red card) 85'	Report	Đapo 70'	Stadium: Fisht Olympic Stadium; Attendance: 2,456; Referee: Ivan Abrosimov
	Penalties
	Kramarič (penalty scored); Kravtsov (penalty missed); Saavedra (penalty scored); Nikitin (penalty missed); Sychevoy (penalty scored)		(penalty scored) Agalarov; (penalty scored) Magomedov; (penalty missed) Mrezigue; (penalty scored) Paltsev; (penalty scored) Cacintura

27 November 2024 Regions QF 1	Ural Yekaterinburg (2)	1–1 (4–3 p)	Khimki (1)	Yekaterinburg
16:00 (18:00 YEKT)	Voronov 77'	Report	Magomedov 83'; Obukhov (red card) 90+2'	Stadium: Yekaterinburg Arena; Attendance: 4,578; Referee: Sergey Cheban
	Penalties
	Mosin (penalty scored); Porokhov (penalty scored); Ítalo (penalty scored); Voronov (penalty scored)		(penalty scored) Rudenko; (penalty scored) Golubović; (penalty missed) Magomedov; (penalty scored) Corredera; (penalty missed) Khosonov
Note: Khimki goalkeeper Igor Obukhov was sent off for a professional foul in added time. As Khimki already used all allowed substitutions at the time, Khosonov had to act as a goalkeeper for the remaining game time, and then for the subsequent penalty shoot-out.

===== Stage 2 =====
11 March 2025 Regions QF 2	Dynamo Makhachkala (1)	1–2	Lokomotiv Moscow (1)	Kaspiysk
18:00	Glushkov (yellow card) 20'; Azzi 22'; Paltsev (yellow card) 45'; Kagermazov (red card) 46'; Agalarov (yellow card) 90+3'; Shumakhov (yellow card) 90+5'	Report	Nenakhov 13'; Timofeyev (yellow card) 45'; Pinyayev 54'; Godyayev (yellow card) 63'; Sarveli (yellow card) 90+5'; Suleymanov (yellow card) 90+5'	Stadium: Anzhi Arena; Attendance: 4,923; Referee: Vasily Kazartsev (St. Petersburg)

11 March 2025 Regions QF 2	Krasnodar (1)	1–2	Akhmat Grozny (1)	Krasnodar
20:30	Córdoba 56' (yellow card) 86'; Cobnan (yellow card) 76'	Report	Luna Diale (yellow card) 20'; Kamilov (yellow card) 36'; Berisha 66', 72' (pen.) (yellow card) 83'	Stadium: Krasnodar Stadium; Attendance: 24,177; Referee: Sergey Cheban (Moscow)

12 March 2025 Regions QF 2	Akron Tolyatti (1)	2–3	Spartak Moscow (1)	Samara
16:00 (17:00 SAMT)	Esanov 58' (pen.); Dzyuba 70'	Report	Martins 17', 59'; Bongonda 20'	Stadium: Solidarnost Samara Arena; Attendance: 2,960; Referee: Artyom Chistyakov (Azov)

12 March 2025 Regions QF 2	Ural Yekaterinburg (2)	1–0	Rubin Kazan (1)	Yekaterinburg
16:00 (18:00 YEKT)	Ar. Mamin (yellow card) 44'; Ayupov 45+2'	Report	Çuni (yellow card) 37'	Stadium: Yekaterinburg Arena; Attendance: 6,572; Referee: Ivan Abrosimov (St. Petersburg)

=== Semi-finals ===
The RPL path semi-final draw was held on 30 November 2024 at 12:30 MSK live on TV-channel «Match Premier».

==== RPL path ====
Team 1	Agg.	Team 2	1st leg	2nd leg
Rostov	0–3	Zenit Saint Petersburg	0–1	0–2
CSKA Moscow	2–1	Dynamo Moscow	2–1	0–0

12 March 2025 RPL SF	Rostov	0–1	Zenit Saint Petersburg	Rostov-on-Don
18:15	Poyarkov (yellow card) 55'; Mohebi (yellow card) 90'	Report	Luiz Henrique (yellow card) 55'; Cassierra 79'; Barrios (yellow card) 90'	Stadium: Rostov Arena; Attendance: 27,895; Referee: Aleksey Sukhoy (Lyubertsy)

16 April 2025 RPL SF	Zenit Saint Petersburg	2–0	Rostov	Saint Petersburg
18:00	Sobolev 57'; Cassierra 64'	Report	Sako (yellow card) 62'	Stadium: Gazprom Arena; Attendance: 32,050; Referee: Vitali Meshkov (Dmitrov)

12 March 2025 RPL SF	CSKA Moscow	2–1	Dynamo Moscow	Moscow
20:30	Koïta 50'; Kislyak 63'; Glebov (yellow card) 90'; Guarirapa (yellow card) 90+5'	Report	Skopintsev 58'; Maouhoub (red card) 61'; Carrascal (yellow card) 90'; Fernández (yellow card) 90+1'	Stadium: VEB Arena; Attendance: 24,873; Referee: Kirill Levnikov (St. Petersburg)

16 April 2025 RPL SF	Dynamo Moscow	0–0	CSKA Moscow	Moscow
20:30	Fomin (yellow card) 58'; Gladyshev (yellow card) 83'	Report	Koïta (yellow card) 60'; Willyan (yellow card) 90+2'; Moisés (yellow card) 90+5'	Stadium: VTB Arena; Attendance: 25,074; Referee: Artyom Chistyakov (Azov)

==== Regions path ====
The draw for regions path semi-final, the host in the regions path final and the hosts in the RPL path final was held on 12 March 2025.

===== Stage 1 =====
15 April 2025 Regions SF 1	Lokomotiv Moscow (1)	2–1	Akhmat Grozny (1)	Moscow
18:00	Vorobyov 44'; Pogostnov 45'; Batrakov (yellow card) 52'; Rakov (yellow card) 88'	Report	Ruiz Díaz 8'; Silva (yellow card) 38'; Berisha (yellow card) 64'	Stadium: RZD Arena; Attendance: 9,456; Referee: Sergey Ivanov (Rostov-on-Don)

15 April 2025 Regions SF 1	Spartak Moscow (1)	3–0	Ural Yekaterinburg (2)	Moscow
20:30	Martins 6'; Marquinhos 28'; Barco 40' (pen.)	Report	Morozov (yellow card) 35'; Yegorychev (yellow card) 42'; Sungatulin (yellow card) 64'	Stadium: Lukoil Arena; Attendance: 26,103; Referee: Yevgeny Kukulyak (Kaluga)

===== Stage 2 =====
29 April 2025 Regions SF 2	Spartak Moscow (1)	2–1	Dynamo Moscow (1)	Moscow
20:30	Martins (yellow card) 11'; Marquinhos 14'; García 50'; Reabciuk (yellow card) 83'; Stanković (yellow card) 93'	Report	Fernández (yellow card) 9'; Denisov 20' (o.g.); Cáceres (yellow card) 25'; Balbuena (yellow card) 68'	Stadium: Lukoil Arena; Attendance: 31,195; Referee: Pavel Kukuyan (Sochi)

30 April 2025 Regions SF 2	Lokomotiv Moscow (1)	0–2	Rostov (1)	Moscow
18:00	Tiknizyan (yellow card) 4'; Rakov (yellow card) 49'; Suleymanov (yellow card) 68'; Godyayev (yellow card) 72'; Samoshnikov (yellow card) 76'	Report	Shchetinin (yellow card) 3'; Osipenko 27' (pen.); Kuchayev (yellow card) 59'; Shantaly (yellow card) 79'; Golenkov 87'	Stadium: RZhD Arena; Attendance: 11,721; Referee: Vladimir Moskalyov (Voronezh)

=== Path finals ===
==== RPL path ====
Team 1	Agg.	Team 2	1st leg	2nd leg
Zenit Saint Petersburg	2–2 (3–4 p)	CSKA Moscow	2–0	0–2

30 April 2025 RPL F	Zenit Saint Petersburg	2–0	CSKA Moscow	Saint Petersburg
20:30	Cassiera 17'; Gorshkov (yellow card) 54'; Mostovoy 57' (pen.); Adamov (yellow card) 63'; Zdjelar (yellow card) 72'; Gondou (yellow card) 90+5'	Report	Gajić (yellow card) 8'; Torop (yellow card) 55'; Glebov (yellow card) 63'	Stadium: Gazprom Arena; Attendance: 51,580; Referee: Sergey Ivanov (Rostov-on-Don)

14 May 2025 RPL F	CSKA Moscow	2–0 (4–3 p)	Zenit Saint Petersburg	Moscow
19:30	Kislyak 37'; Willyan (yellow card) 45+5'; Oblyakov (yellow card) 73'; Musayev 90+2'	Report		Stadium: VEB Arena; Attendance: 27,659; Referee: Vitali Meshkov (Dmitrov)
	Penalties
	Diveyev (penalty scored); Alerrandro (penalty scored); Kislyak (penalty scored); Krugovoy (penalty scored)		(penalty missed) Sobolev; (penalty scored) Santos; (penalty scored) Mostovoy; (penalty scored) Luiz Henrique; (penalty missed) Mantuan

==== Regions path ====
15 May 2025 Regions F	Spartak Moscow (1)	1–2	Rostov (1)	Moscow
20:00	García 76'; Ugalde (yellow card) 47' (yellow-red card) 84'; Babić (yellow card) 90'; Umyarov (red card) 90+5'; Stanković (yellow card) 90+2' (yellow-red card) 90+8'	Report	Ignatov (yellow card) 13'; Maksimenko 31' (o.g.); Komarov (yellow card) 69'; Komlichenko 78'; Bayramyan (yellow card) 90'; Yatimov (yellow card) 90+3'	Stadium: Lukoil Arena; Attendance: 36,085; Referee: Kirill Levnikov (St. Petersburg)

=== Final ===
1 June 2025
18:00

Rostov	0–0	CSKA Moscow
Melyokhin (yellow card) 45+5'; Sako (yellow card) 58'; Shchetinin (yellow card) 82'	Report
Penalties
Bayramyan (penalty missed); Komlichenko (penalty scored); Sutormin (penalty missed); Sako (penalty scored); Osipenko (penalty scored)	3–4	(penalty scored) Pjanić; (penalty missed) Diveyev; (penalty scored) Oblyakov; (penalty scored) Kislyak; (penalty scored) Gajić

Luzhniki Stadium, Moscow
Attendance: 57,176
Referee: Kirill Levnikov
