= Dmitry Mikhaylenko =

Dmitry Mikhaylenko may refer to:

- Dmitry Mikhaylenko (footballer, born 1995), Russian football player
- Dmitry Mikhaylenko (footballer, born 2000), Russian football player
- Dmytro Mykhaylenko (born 1973), Ukrainian football player
