= Maksim Khramtsov =

Maksim Khramtsov may refer to:

- Maksim Khramtsov (footballer) (born 2002), Russian footballer
- Maksim Khramtsov (taekwondo practitioner) (born 1998), Russian taekwondo practitioner
