= Pavel Kuznetsov (disambiguation) =

Pavel Kuznetsov (1878–1968) was a Russian artist.

Pavel Kuznetsov may also refer to:

- Pavel Kuznetsov (diplomat) (born 1958), Russian diplomat
- Pavel Kuznetsov (weightlifter) (born 1961), Soviet weightlifter
- Pavel Kuznetsov (footballer) (born 2002), Russian footballer
