= Saminu (name) =

Saminu is a name. Notable people with the name include:

- Saminu Abdullahi (born 2001), a Nigerian footballer
- Abdul-Rasheed Saminu (born 2001), a Ghanaian sprinter
- Ibrahim Saminu Turaki (born 1963), a Nigerian actuary
