= Igor Egorov =

Russian football official (born 1968)

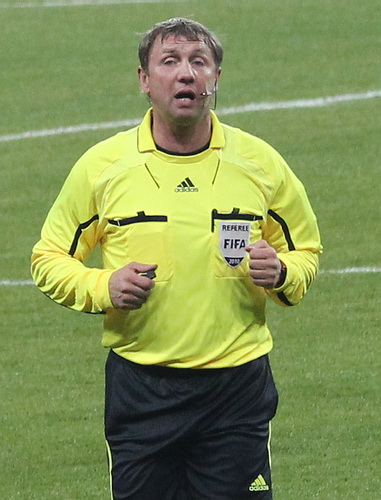

Personal information
- Full name: Igor Vyacheslavovich Egorov
- Date of birth: 4 November 1968 (age 57)
- Place of birth: Gorky, Russian SFSR
- Position: Midfielder

Team information
- Current team: FC Yenisey Krasnoyarsk (director)

Youth career
- 1975–1984: DYuSSh-8 Gorky

Senior career*
Years	Team	Apps	(Gls)
1986–1987	FC Khimik Dzerzhinsk	47	(1)
1990	FC Lokomotiv Nizhny Novgorod	3	(0)
1990	FC Khimik Dzerzhinsk	9	(0)

Managerial career
- 2008: FC Nizhny Novgorod-2 Nizhny Novgorod (D4) (assistant)
- 2012–2013: FC Volga Nizhny Novgorod (director of sports)
- 2017: FC Anzhi Makhachkala (director)
- 2017–: FC Yenisey Krasnoyarsk (director)
- * Club domestic league appearances and goals

Igor Vyacheslavovich Egorov (Russian: Игорь Вячеславович Егоров; born 4 November 1968) is a Russian football official and a former referee and player. He works as a team director with FC Yenisey Krasnoyarsk.

== Refereeing career ==
He has been a FIFA international referee since 2003. He lives in Nizhny Novgorod and is a businessman. He was named best Russian referee by the Sport Express newspaper in 2006 and 2007. He has refereed games in the UEFA Champions League and UEFA Cup, as well as UEFA Euro 2008 and 2010 FIFA World Cup qualifiers.

== Personal life ==
He is the father of former Dzerzhinsk defender Yegor Yegorov, who became a referee himself in 2014.
