= Aleksandr Korotkov (footballer, born 2000) =

Russian footballer

Personal information
- Full name: Aleksandr Aleksandrovich Korotkov
- Date of birth: 29 March 2000 (age 26)
- Place of birth: Saint Petersburg, Russia
- Height: 1.84 m (6 ft 0 in)
- Position: Full-back

Team information
- Current team: Ural Yekaterinburg
- Number: 24

Youth career
- –2019: Zenit St. Petersburg

Senior career*
Years	Team	Apps	(Gls)
2019–2022	Rodina Moscow	33	(1)
2021–2022	→ Veles Moscow (loan)	31	(0)
2022–2025	Alania Vladikavkaz	14	(0)
2023–2025	→ Arsenal Tula (loan)	36	(1)
2025	Tyumen	13	(0)
2025–2026	Rotor Volgograd	20	(1)
2026–	Ural Yekaterinburg	0	(0)
- * Club domestic league appearances and goals as of 16 May 2026

Aleksandr Aleksandrovich Korotkov (Russian: Александр Александрович Коротков; born 29 March 2000) is a Russian football player who plays as a full-back (left or right) for Ural Yekaterinburg.

== Club career ==
He made his debut in the Russian Football National League for Veles Moscow on 10 July 2021 in a game against Yenisey Krasnoyarsk.
