= Ilya Kuptsov =

Russian footballer (born 2002)

Personal information
- Full name: Ilya Aleksandrovich Kuptsov
- Date of birth: 25 January 2002 (age 24)
- Place of birth: Moscow, Russia
- Height: 1.98 m (6 ft 6 in)
- Position: Goalkeeper

Team information
- Current team: Veles Moscow
- Number: 76

Youth career
- –2022: Dynamo Moscow

Senior career*
Years	Team	Apps	(Gls)
2020–2025	Dynamo-2 Moscow	37	(0)
2022–2025	Dynamo Moscow	0	(0)
2024–2025	→ KAMAZ Naberezhnye Chelny (loan)	8	(0)
2025–	Veles Moscow	3	(0)

International career^{‡}
2017	Russia U16	3	(0)
2019	Russia U17	2	(0)
- * Club domestic league appearances and goals as of 13 June 2026 ‡ National team caps and goals as of 10 May 2019

Ilya Aleksandrovich Kuptsov (Russian: Илья Александрович Купцов; born 21 January 2002) is a Russian football player who plays as a goalkeeper for Veles Moscow.

== Club career ==
Kuptsov made his debut for the main squad of Dynamo Moscow on 25 July 2023 in a Russian Cup game against Pari Nizhny Novgorod.

On 18 July 2025, Kuptsov moved to Veles Moscow in Russian Second League.

== International career ==
Kuptsov represented Russia at the 2019 UEFA European Under-17 Championship, where they were eliminated at group stage.

== Career statistics ==
As of match played 24 May 2025

Appearances and goals by club, season and competition
Club	Season	League			Cup		Continental		Other		Total	
Club	Season	Division	Apps	Goals	Apps	Goals	Apps	Goals	Apps	Goals	Apps	Goals
Dynamo-2 Moscow	2020–21	Russian Second League	0	0	–		–		–		0	0
Dynamo-2 Moscow	2021–22	Russian Second League	4	0	–		–		–		4	0
Dynamo-2 Moscow	2022–23	Russian Second League	15	0	–		–		–		15	0
Dynamo-2 Moscow	2023	Russian Second League B	10	0	–		–		–		10	0
Dynamo-2 Moscow	2024	Russian Second League B	4	0	–		–		–		4	0
Dynamo-2 Moscow	Total		33	0	–		–		–		33	0
Dynamo Moscow	2023–24	Russian Premier League	0	0	1	0	–		–		1	0
KAMAZ (loan)	2024–25	Russian First League	8	0	1	0	–		–		9	0
Career total			41	0	2	0	0	0	0	0	43	0
