= 2024–25 FC Tyumen season =

FC Tyumen
2024–25 season
- Stadium: Geolog Stadium
- Russian First League: 13th
- Russian Cup: Pre-season
- Biggest win: Shinnik Yaroslavl 0–2 Tyumen

The 2024–25 season is the 64th season in the history of FC Tyumen, and the club's second consecutive season in the Russian First League. In addition to the domestic league, the team is scheduled to participate in the Russian Cup.

== Transfers ==
=== In ===
Pos.	Player	Transferred from	Fee	Date	Source
GK	(Russia) Yevgeni Goshev	(Russia) Dynamo Makhachkala	Free	18 July 2024	

== Competitions ==
=== Overall record ===
Competition	First match	Last match	Starting round	Record							
Competition	First match	Last match	Starting round	Pld	W	D	L	GF	GA	GD	Win %
Russian First League	14 July 2024		Matchday 1	4	1	1	2	4	6	−2	25.00
Russian Cup				0	0	0	0	0	0	+0	—
Total				4	1	1	2	4	6	−2	25.00

Last updated: 2 August 2024
Source: Soccerway

=== Russian First League ===
==== League table ====
Pos	Team	Pld	W	D	L	GF	GA	GD	Pts	Promotion, qualification or relegation
14	Shinnik Yaroslavl	34	8	11	15	24	42	−18	35 (Note: Ranked on head-to-head goal difference (Shinnik +1, Ufa –1))	
15	Ufa	34	9	8	17	32	48	−16	35	
16	Sokol Saratov (Note: Sokol was not relegated despite finishing in the relegation spot, as Khimki which was administratively relegated from Premier League to the First League was later dissolved, with Sokol replacing them in the First League)	34	7	11	16	25	41	−16	32	
17	Alania Vladikavkaz (R)	34	6	9	19	24	50	−26	27 (Note: Ranked on head-to-head points (Alania 4, Tyumen 1))	Relegation to Second League
18	Tyumen (R)	34	7	6	21	30	51	−21	27	Relegation to Second League

Source: Soccerway
Rules for classification: 1) Points; 2) Head-to-head points; 3) Head-to-head matches won; 4) Head-to-head goal difference; 5) Head-to-head goals scored; 6) Head-to-head away goals scored; 7) Matches won; 8) Goal difference; 9) Goals scored; 10) Away matches won; 11) Away goals scored; 12) Best disciplinary record (3 points for red card, 1 point for yellow card); 13) Drawing lots. If teams tied on points did not play an equal number of head-to-head games, head-to-head criteria and disciplinary record are not used for positioning. If 1st- and 2nd-placed teams are tied in the final standings on the first 12 criteria, a winner is determined in an additional play-off game, with no extra time and a penalty-shootout if tied at the end of regulation, instead of drawing lots.
(R) Relegated

==== Results summary ====
Overall								Home						Away					
Pld	W	D	L	GF	GA	GD	Pts	W	D	L	GF	GA	GD	W	D	L	GF	GA	GD
4	1	1	2	4	6	−2	4	0	0	1	0	1	−1	1	1	1	4	5	−1

Last updated: 2 August 2024.

==== Results by round ====
Round	1	2	3	4
Ground	A	H	A	A
Result	L	L	W	D
Position	17	17	13	

Updated to match(es) played on 2 August 2024. Source:
A = Away; H = Home; W = Win; D = Draw; L = Loss

==== Matches ====
The tentative match schedule was released on 27 June.

14 July 2024 1	Neftekhimik Nizhnekamsk	3–0	Tyumen	Nizhnekamsk
18:00 UTC+3	Said Aliyev 23'; Petrov 36'; Dzhamilov 60'			Stadium: Neftekhimik Stadium; Referee: Oleg Sokolov

21 July 2024 2	Tyumen	0–1	Alania Vladikavkaz	Tyumen
12:30 UTC+3			Gagloev 90+3'	Stadium: Geolog Stadium; Attendance: 3,413; Referee: Kirill Silantyev

28 July 2024 3	Shinnik Yaroslavl	0–2	Tyumen	Yaroslavl
18:30 UTC+3			Kenfack 60'; Korotayev 90+4'	Stadium: Shinnik Stadium; Attendance: 2,823; Referee: Maxim Perezva

2 August 2024 4	Ufa	2–2	Tyumen	Ufa
17:30 UTC+3	Ageyan 42'; Kutin 65'		Kuptsov 2'; Voropayev 18'; Shavlokhov (red card) 36'	Stadium: Neftyanik Stadium
