= Danil Akhatov =

Russian footballer

Personal information
- Full name: Danil Ilgizovich Akhatov
- Date of birth: 22 December 2003 (age 22)
- Place of birth: Neftekamsk, Russia
- Height: 1.72 m (5 ft 8 in)
- Position: Forward

Team information
- Current team: FC Ufa
- Number: 23

Youth career
- FC Ufa

Senior career*
| Years | Team | Apps | (Gls) |
| 2021– | FC Ufa | 57 | (2) |
| 2024 | → FC Amkar Perm (loan) | 17 | (1) |
- * Club domestic league appearances and goals as of 16 May 2026

Danil Ilgizovich Akhatov (Russian: Данил Ильгизович Ахатов; born 22 December 2003) is a Russian football player who plays for FC Ufa.

== Club career ==
He made his debut in the Russian Premier League for FC Ufa on 12 September 2021 in a game against PFC Sochi.

== Career statistics ==
As of 28 May 2022

| Club | Season | League | | | Cup | | Continental | | Total | |
| Club | Season | Division | Apps | Goals | Apps | Goals | Apps | Goals | Apps | Goals |
|---|---|---|---|---|---|---|---|---|---|---|
| Ufa | 2021–22 | RPL | 2 | 0 | 1 | 0 | – | | 3 | 0 |
| Career total | | | 2 | 0 | 1 | 0 | 0 | 0 | 3 | 0 |
