= Yegor Mosin =

Russian footballer

Personal information
- Full name: Yegor Konstantinovich Mosin
- Date of birth: 31 August 2003 (age 23)
- Place of birth: Yekaterinburg, Russia
- Height: 1.75 m (5 ft 9 in)
- Position: Left winger

Team information
- Current team: SKA-Khabarovsk (on loan from Ural Yekaterinburg)
- Number: 14

Youth career
- 2019–2021: UOR #5 Yegoryevsk
- 2021–2023: Ural Yekaterinburg

Senior career*
Years	Team	Apps	(Gls)
2021–2024	Ural-2 Yekaterinburg	48	(5)
2022–	Ural Yekaterinburg	42	(4)
2026–	→ SKA-Khabarovsk (loan)	3	(0)
- * Club domestic league appearances and goals as of 5 September 2026

Yegor Konstantinovich Mosin (Russian: Егор Константинович Мосин; born 31 August 2003) is a Russian football player who plays as a left winger for SKA-Khabarovsk on loan from Ural Yekaterinburg.

== Career ==
Mosin made his debut in the Russian Premier League for Ural Yekaterinburg on 26 August 2023 in a game against Zenit Saint Petersburg.

== Career statistics ==
As of 2 June 2024

Club	Season	League			Cup		Continental		Other		Total	
Club	Season	Division	Apps	Goals	Apps	Goals	Apps	Goals	Apps	Goals	Apps	Goals
Ural-2 Yekaterinburg	2021–22	Russian Second League	11	0	–		–		–		11	0
Ural-2 Yekaterinburg	2022–23	Russian Second League	21	0	–		–		–		21	0
Ural-2 Yekaterinburg	2023	Russian Second League B	6	1	–		–		–		6	1
Ural-2 Yekaterinburg	2024	Russian Second League B	8	3	–		–		–		8	3
Ural-2 Yekaterinburg	Total		46	4	0	0	0	0	0	0	46	4
Ural Yekaterinburg	2022–23	Russian Premier League	0	0	0	0	–		–		0	0
Ural Yekaterinburg	2023–24	Russian Premier League	1	0	1	0	–		0	0	2	0
Ural Yekaterinburg	Total		1	0	1	0	0	0	0	0	2	0
Career total			47	4	1	0	0	0	0	0	48	4
