= Maksim Khramtsov (footballer) =

Russian footballer

Personal information
- Full name: Maksim Sergeyevich Khramtsov
- Date of birth: 4 February 2002 (age 24)
- Place of birth: Volgograd, Russia
- Height: 1.85 m (6 ft 1 in)
- Position: Left back

Team information
- Current team: Rotor Volgograd
- Number: 23

Youth career
- 2011–2018: Krasnodar

Senior career*
Years	Team	Apps	(Gls)
2019	Krasnodar	0	(0)
2019	→ Krasnodar-3	9	(1)
2021	→ Krasnodar-2	1	(0)
2022–2023	Baltika Kaliningrad	5	(0)
2022–2023	→ Baltika-BFU Kaliningrad	30	(1)
2023–2025	Dynamo Makhachkala	32	(0)
2024–2025	→ Tyumen (loan)	23	(2)
2025–	Rotor Volgograd	14	(0)
2026–	→ Rotor-2 Volgograd	9	(0)
- * Club domestic league appearances and goals as of 31 October 2026

Maksim Sergeyevich Khramtsov (Russian: Максим Сергеевич Храмцов; born 4 February 2002) is a Russian football player who plays as a left defender for Rotor Volgograd. He also plays as a left-back or a centre-back.

== Club career ==
Khramtsov made his debut in the Russian Football National League for Krasnodar-2 on 8 August 2021 in a game against SKA-Khabarovsk.

He made his Russian Premier League debut for Dynamo Makhachkala on 21 July 2024 in a game against Khimki.

== Career statistics ==
As of match played 24 May 2025

Appearances and goals by club, season and competition
Club	Season	League			Cup		Continental		Other		Total	
Club	Season	Division	Apps	Goals	Apps	Goals	Apps	Goals	Apps	Goals	Apps	Goals
Krasnodar-3	2019–20	Russian Second League	9	1	—		—		—		9	1
Krasnodar-2	2021–22	Russian First League	1	0	—		—		—		1	0
Baltika Kaliningrad	2021–22	Russian First League	5	0	0	0	—		—		5	0
Baltika Kaliningrad	2022–23	Russian First League	0	0	0	0	—		—		0	0
Baltika Kaliningrad	Total		5	0	0	0	0	0	0	0	5	0
Baltika-BFU Kaliningrad	2021–22	Russian Second League	4	0	—		—		—		4	0
Baltika-BFU Kaliningrad	2022–23	Russian Second League	26	1	—		—		—		26	1
Baltika-BFU Kaliningrad	Total		30	1	0	0	0	0	0	0	30	1
Dynamo Makhachkala	2023–24	Russian First League	30	0	0	0	—		—		30	0
Dynamo Makhachkala	2024–25	Russian Premier League	2	0	0	0	—		—		2	0
Dynamo Makhachkala	Total		32	0	0	0	—		—		32	0
Tyumen (loan)	2024–25	Russian First League	23	2	3	0	—		—		26	2
Career total			100	4	3	0	0	0	0	0	103	4
