= Dmitry Mikhaylenko (footballer, born 2000) =

Russian footballer

Personal information
- Full name: Dmitry Vitalyevich Mikhaylenko
- Date of birth: 28 February 2000 (age 26)
- Place of birth: Orsk, Russia
- Height: 1.85 m (6 ft 1 in)
- Position: Defender

Senior career*
| Years | Team | Apps | (Gls) |
| 2016 | FC Vidnoye (amateur) | | |
| 2017 | LFK Lokomotiv Moscow | | |
| 2019–2020 | FC Nosta Novotroitsk | 0 | (0) |
| 2020–2021 | FC Kolomna | 28 | (1) |
| 2021–2022 | FC Khimik Dzerzhinsk | 18 | (1) |
| 2022–2024 | FC Veles Moscow | 47 | (0) |
| 2024 | FC Murom | 15 | (0) |
| 2024–2025 | FC Khimik Dzerzhinsk | 22 | (1) |
- * Club domestic league appearances and goals as of 19 October 2025

Dmitry Vitalyevich Mikhaylenko (Russian: Дмитрий Витальевич Михайленко; born 28 February 2000) is a Russian football player.

== Club career ==
He made his debut in the Russian Football National League for FC Veles Moscow on 6 March 2022 in a game against FC Akron Tolyatti.
