= Karim Girayev =

Russian football player

Personal information
- Full name: Karim Magomedovich Girayev
- Date of birth: 14 June 1997 (age 29)
- Place of birth: Makhachkala, Russia
- Height: 1.90 m (6 ft 3 in)
- Position: Forward

Team information
- Current team: FC Veles Moscow
- Number: 9

Youth career
- FC Anzhi Makhachkala

Senior career*
Years	Team	Apps	(Gls)
2015–2018	FC Anzhi Makhachkala	0	(0)
2015–2018	→ FC Anzhi-2 Makhachkala	11	(0)
2018	→ FC Legion Dynamo Makhachkala (loan)	7	(0)
2018–2019	FC Biolog-Novokubansk	26	(2)
2019–2020	FC Makhachkala	29	(8)
2021–2023	FC Akron Tolyatti	60	(8)
2023	FC KAMAZ Naberezhnye Chelny	6	(0)
2023	FC Arsenal Tula	5	(0)
2023	FC Arsenal-2 Tula	2	(1)
2024	FC Tekstilshchik Ivanovo	9	(0)
2024–2025	FC Murom	32	(5)
2025–	FC Veles Moscow	18	(1)
- * Club domestic league appearances and goals as of 13 June 2026

Karim Magomedovich Girayev (Russian: Карим Магомедович Гираев; born 14 June 1997) is a Russian football player who plays for FC Veles Moscow.

== Club career ==
He made his debut in the Russian Football National League for FC Akron Tolyatti on 27 February 2021 in a game against FC Veles Moscow.
