= Vladislav Teplyakov =

Russian footballer (born 2004)

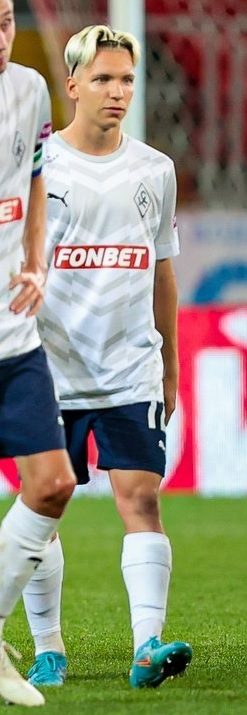
- Teplyakov with Krylia Sovetov in 2022

Personal information
- Full name: Vladislav Valeryevich Teplyakov
- Date of birth: 23 July 2004 (age 22)
- Height: 1.71 m (5 ft 7 in)
- Position: Left-back

Youth career
- Krylia Sovetov Samara

Senior career*
Years	Team	Apps	(Gls)
2022–2024	Krylia Sovetov Samara	0	(0)
2024	Krylia Sovetov-2 Samara	7	(0)
2024–2025	Murom	31	(0)
2025–2026	Dynamo Kirov	21	(0)
- * Club domestic league appearances and goals as of 14 June 2026

Vladislav Valeryevich Teplyakov (Russian: Владислав Валерьевич Тепляков; born 23 July 2004) is a Russian footballer who plays as a left back.

== Career ==
Teplyakov made his debut for the senior team of Krylia Sovetov Samara on 30 August 2022 in a Russian Cup game against Spartak Moscow.

== Career statistics ==
As of 25 May 2024

Appearances and goals by club, season and competition
Club	Season	League			Cup		Continental		Total	
Club	Season	Division	Apps	Goals	Apps	Goals	Apps	Goals	Apps	Goals
Krylia Sovetov Samara	2021–22	Russian Premier League	0	0	0	0	–		0	0
Krylia Sovetov Samara	2022–23	Russian Premier League	0	0	1	0	–		1	0
Krylia Sovetov Samara	2023–24	Russian Premier League	0	0	0	0	–		0	0
Krylia Sovetov Samara	Total		0	0	1	0	0	0	1	0
Krylia Sovetov-2 Samara	2024	Russian Second League B	7	0	–		–		7	0
Career total			7	0	1	0	0	0	8	0
