= Stepan Kostyukov =

Russian footballer

Personal information
- Full name: Stepan Pavlovich Kostyukov
- Date of birth: 11 January 1999 (age 27)
- Place of birth: Moscow, Russia
- Height: 1.91 m (6 ft 3 in)
- Position: Forward

Youth career
- –2011: Rinat Dasayev Academy
- 2011–2012: DYuSSh Yunost Selyatino
- 2012–2013: DFK Rosich Moskovsky
- 2013–2016: FC Strogino Moscow
- 2016–2017: FC Spartak Moscow
- 2017: FC Rubin Kazan
- 2017–2018: FC Tosno

Senior career*
Years	Team	Apps	(Gls)
2018–2021	FC Strogino Moscow	46	(15)
2021	FC Metallurg Lipetsk	4	(0)
2022	FC Torpedo Vladimir	8	(0)
2022–2023	FC Chernomorets Novorossiysk	25	(10)
2023	FC Sakhalinets Moscow	17	(3)
- * Club domestic league appearances and goals as of 12 November 2023

Stepan Pavlovich Kostyukov (Russian: Степан Павлович Костюков; born 11 January 1999) is a Russian football player.

== Club career ==
He made his debut in the Russian Football National League for FC Metallurg Lipetsk on 21 August 2021 in a game against FC Krasnodar-2.
