= Semyon Radostev =

Russian footballer

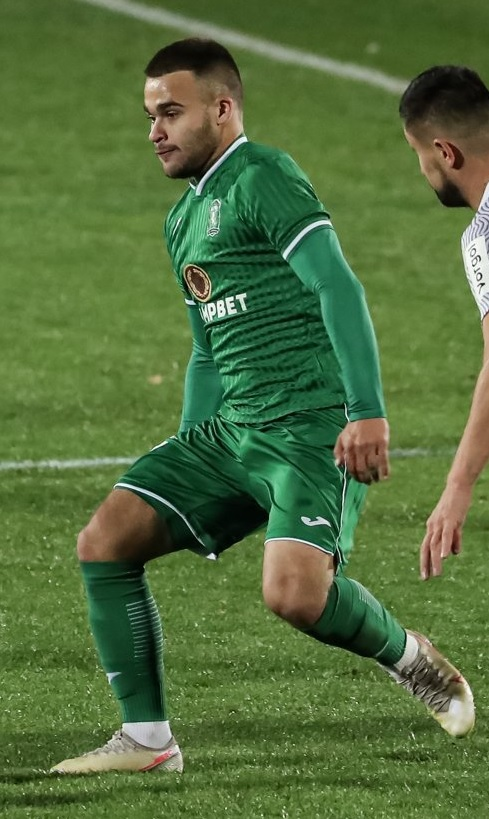
- Radostev with Tom Tomsk in 2021

Personal information
- Full name: Semyon Yuryevich Radostev
- Date of birth: 17 January 2000 (age 26)
- Place of birth: Perm, Russia
- Height: 1.70 m (5 ft 7 in)
- Position: Midfielder

Youth career
- Amkar Perm

Senior career*
Years	Team	Apps	(Gls)
2017	Chertanovo-M Moscow		
2018–2019	Chertanovo Moscow	3	(0)
2018–2019	→ Chertanovo-2 Moscow	18	(2)
2019–2021	Saturn Ramenskoye	42	(11)
2021–2022	Tom Tomsk	23	(0)
2022	Salyut Belgorod	14	(0)
2023	Sakhalinets Moscow	10	(0)
2024	Torpedo Vladimir	29	(1)
2025	Kosmos Dolgoprudny	25	(0)
2026	Astrakhan	11	(0)

International career^{‡}
2015–2016	Russia U-16	6	(0)
2016–2017	Russia U-17	8	(0)
2018	Russia U-18	4	(0)
2018	Russia U-19	6	(0)
- * Club domestic league appearances and goals as of 27 June 2026 ‡ National team caps and goals as of 13 October 2018

Semyon Yuryevich Radostev (Russian: Семён Юрьевич Радостев; born 17 January 2000) is a Russian football player.

== Club career ==
He made his debut in the Russian Professional Football League for Chertanovo-2 Moscow on 18 July 2018 in a game against Murom.

He made his Russian Football National League debut for Chertanovo Moscow on 10 November 2018 in a game against Armavir.
