= Dmitri Lesnikov =

Russian footballer

Personal information
- Full name: Dmitri Andreyevich Lesnikov
- Date of birth: 22 June 1999 (age 27)
- Place of birth: Astrakhan, Russia
- Height: 1.80 m (5 ft 11 in)
- Position: Forward

Team information
- Current team: FC Biolog-Novokubansk
- Number: 17

Senior career*
Years	Team	Apps	(Gls)
2016–	FC Volgar Astrakhan	219	(26)
2021	→ FC Biolog-Novokubansk (loan)	15	(14)

International career^{‡}
2016	Russia U-17	1	(0)
- * Club domestic league appearances and goals as of 15 November 2026 ‡ National team caps and goals as of 25 February 2016

Dmitri Andreyevich Lesnikov (Russian: Дмитрий Андреевич Лесников; born 22 June 1999) is a Russian football player who plays for FC Volgar Astrakhan.

== Club career ==
He made his debut in the Russian Football National League for FC Volgar Astrakhan on 21 May 2016 in a game against FC Sibir Novosibirsk.
