= Yegor Yegorov =

Russian footballer and referee

Personal information
- Full name: Yegor Igorevich Yegorov
- Date of birth: 16 November 1992 (age 33)
- Place of birth: Nizhny Novgorod, Russia
- Height: 1.79 m (5 ft 10 1/2 in)
- Position: Defender

Senior career*
Years	Team	Apps	(Gls)
2010	FC Nizhny Novgorod-2		
2010–2012	FC Nizhny Novgorod	4	(0)
2012–2013	FC Khimik Dzerzhinsk	10	(0)
- * Club domestic league appearances and goals

Yegor Igorevich Yegorov (Russian: Егор Игоревич Егоров; born 16 November 1992) is a Russian football referee and a former defender.

== Club career ==
He made his Russian Football National League debut for FC Nizhny Novgorod on 17 June 2011 in a game against FC Khimki.

== Referee career ==
After retiring as a player, he started refereeing in 2014, and began to be assigned as main referee in the Russian Professional Football League games in the 2017–18 season.

== Personal life ==
He is a son of Igor Egorov.
