= Artur Murza =

Ukrainian footballer

Personal information
- Full name: Artur Arturovych Murza
- Date of birth: 13 July 2000 (age 26)
- Place of birth: Volnovakha, Ukraine
- Height: 1.81 m (5 ft 11 in)
- Position: Left midfielder

Team information
- Current team: Veles Moscow
- Number: 7

Youth career
- 2013–2014: Shakhtar Donetsk
- 2014–2015: Arsenal Kyiv
- 2015–2017: Illichivets Mariupol

Senior career*
Years	Team	Apps	(Gls)
2017–2019	Mariupol	1	(0)
2019	Volyn Lutsk	1	(0)
2020	Avanhard Kramatorsk	11	(1)
2020	Hirnyk-Sport Horishni Plavni	14	(3)
2021–2022	Obolon Kyiv	29	(10)
2022	Metalist Kharkiv	0	(0)
2022	→ Kyzylzhar (loan)	8	(0)
2022	Valmiera	1	(1)
2023	Aksu	9	(0)
2023–2024	Kapfenberger SV	16	(2)
2024	Murom	15	(1)
2024–2026	Volga Ulyanovsk	55	(9)
2026–	Veles Moscow	0	(0)
- * Club domestic league appearances and goals as of 16 May 2026

Artur Arturovych Murza (Ukrainian: Артур Артурович Мурза; born 13 July 2000) is a Ukrainian professional footballer who plays as a left midfielder for Russian club Veles Moscow. He also possesses Russian citizenship.

== Career ==
=== Valmiera ===
On 17 July 2022, he moved to Valmiera in the Latvian Higher League.

== Honours ==
Valmiera

- Latvian Higher League: 2022
