= Danila Godyayev =

Russian footballer

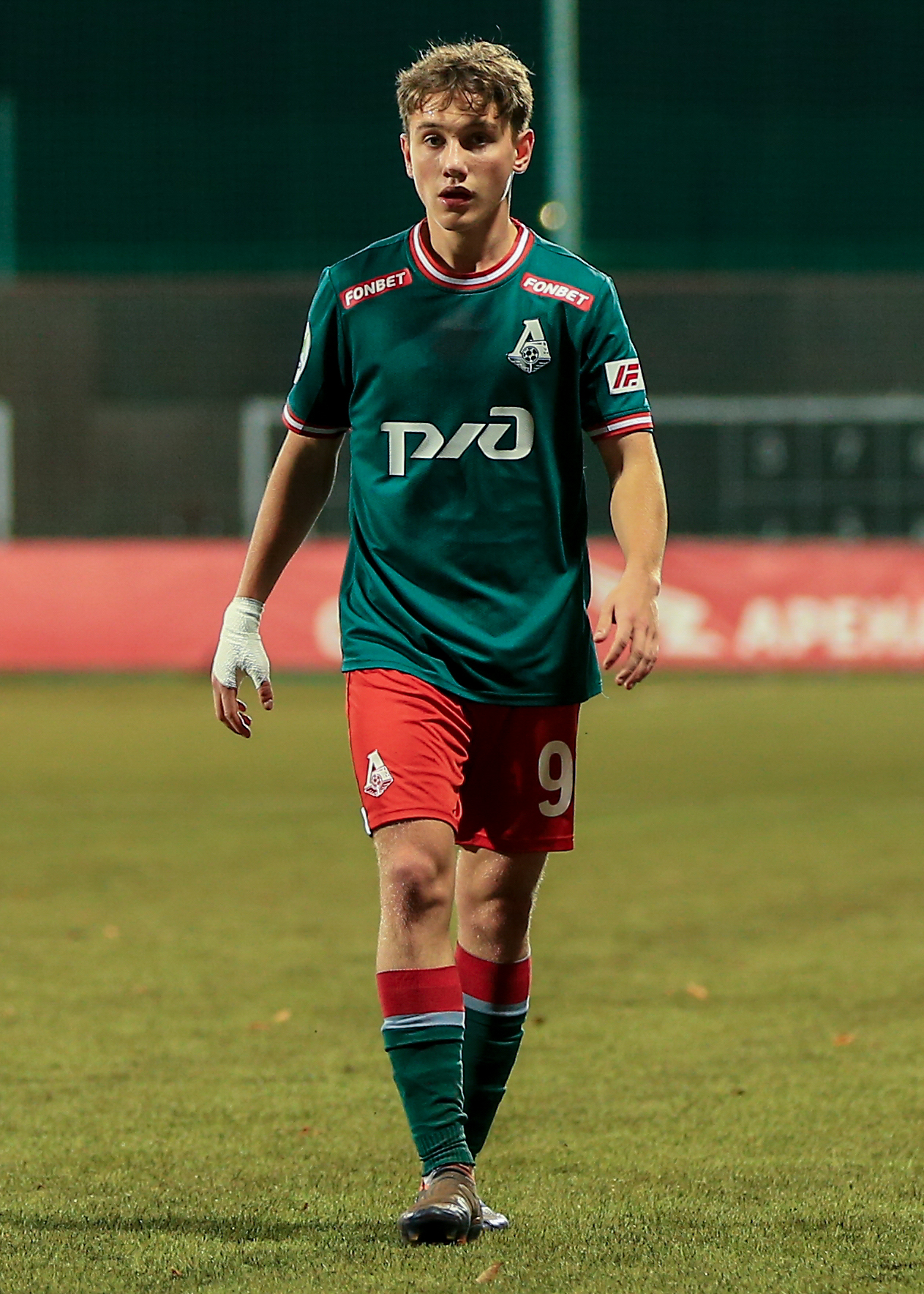
- Godyayev in 2023

Personal information
- Full name: Danila Aleksandrovich Godyayev
- Date of birth: 20 April 2004 (age 22)
- Place of birth: Novotroitsk, Russia
- Height: 1.70 m (5 ft 7 in)
- Position: Central midfielder

Team information
- Current team: Lokomotiv Moscow
- Number: 47

Youth career
- –2015: Nosta Novotroitsk
- 2015–2024: Lokomotiv Moscow

Senior career*
Years	Team	Apps	(Gls)
2024–	Lokomotiv Moscow	20	(0)
2024	→ Arsenal Dzerzhinsk (loan)	25	(5)

International career^{‡}
2025–	Russia U21	2	(0)
- * Club domestic league appearances and goals as of 6 November 2026 ‡ National team caps and goals as of 23 March 2025

Danila Aleksandrovich Godyayev (Russian: Данила Александрович Годяев; born 20 April 2004) is a Russian football player who plays as a central midfielder for Lokomotiv Moscow.

== Career ==
Godyayev joined the junior academy system of Lokomotiv Moscow at the age of 11.

On 15 March 2024, Godyayev moved on loan to Arsenal Dzerzhinsk of the Belarusian Premier League, where he played in most of the 2024 season games as Arsenal finished 10th.

Upon his return from loan, Godyayev signed a new contract with Lokomotiv until June 2028.

Godyayev started Lokomotiv's first game after the Russian Premier League re-started after a winter break on 28 February 2025 against Dynamo Makhachkala.

== Career statistics ==
As of 6 November 2026

Club	Season	League			Cup		Total	
Club	Season	Division	Apps	Goals	Apps	Goals	Apps	Goals
Arsenal Dzerzhinsk (loan)	2024	Belarusian Premier League	25	5	1	0	26	5
Lokomotiv Moscow	2024–25	Russian Premier League	10	0	3	0	13	0
Lokomotiv Moscow	2025–26	Russian Premier League	3	0	4	0	7	0
Lokomotiv Moscow	2026–27	Russian Premier League	7	0	4	0	11	0
Lokomotiv Moscow	Total		20	0	11	0	31	0
Career total			45	5	12	0	57	5
