= Saminu Abdullahi =

Nigerian footballer (born 2001)

Personal information
- Full name: Saminu Kwari Abdullahi
- Date of birth: 3 January 2001 (age 25)
- Place of birth: Jos, Nigeria
- Height: 1.81 m (5 ft 11 in)
- Position: Defensive midfielder

Youth career
- Gee-Lec Academy

Senior career*
Years	Team	Apps	(Gls)
2019–2022	Spartaks Jūrmala	47	(2)
2021–2022	→ Veles Moscow (loan)	23	(1)
2023	Veles Moscow	14	(0)
2023	Dynamo Makhachkala	19	(2)
2024–2025	Khimki	16	(0)
2025	Juárez	3	(0)
2025–2026	KAMAZ Naberezhnye Chelny	7	(0)
- * Club domestic league appearances and goals as of 16 May 2026

Saminu Kwari Abdullahi (born 3 January 2001) is a Nigerian football player who plays as a defensive midfielder.

== Club career ==
Abdullahi made his debut in the Russian Football National League for Veles Moscow on 31 July 2021 in a game against Tom Tomsk.

On 1 January 2024, Dynamo Makhachkala announced that Abdullahi had left the club after his contract was cancelled by mutual consent.

In January 2025, Abdullahi left Khimki. On 31 January 2025, Mexican club Juárez announced the signing of Abdullahi. He became the club's first African player.

== Career statistics ==
As of match played 16 May 2026

Appearances and goals by club, season and competition
Club	Season	League			Cup		Total	
Club	Season	Division	Apps	Goals	Apps	Goals	Apps	Goals
Spartaks Jūrmala	2019	Latvian Higher League	7	0	0	0	7	0
Spartaks Jūrmala	2020	Latvian Higher League	25	2	2	0	27	2
Spartaks Jūrmala	2021	Latvian Higher League	15	0	0	0	15	0
Spartaks Jūrmala	Total		47	2	2	0	49	2
Veles Moscow (loan)	2021–22	Russian First League	23	1	2	0	25	1
Veles Moscow	2022–23	Russian First League	14	0	—		14	0
Dynamo Makhachkala	2023–24	Russian First League	19	2	0	0	19	2
Khimki	2023–24	Russian First League	9	0	1	0	10	0
Khimki	2024–25	Russian Premier League	7	0	7	0	14	0
Khimki	Total		16	0	8	0	24	0
Juárez	2024–25	Liga MX	3	0	0	0	3	0
KAMAZ Naberezhnye Chelny	2025–26	Russian First League	7	0	1	0	8	0
Career total			129	5	13	0	142	5
