= Match Premier Channel =

TV channel about Russian soccer

- Country: Russia
- Broadcast area: Russia; Belarus; Moldova; Norway; Serbia; Armenia

Programming
- Language: Russian
- Picture format: 16:9 (SDTV); 1080i (HDTV)

Ownership
- Owner: Gazprom-Media (since 2006); NTV Plus» (2006–2012); LIGA-TV (2012–2015); ООО GPM Match (from November 1, 2015)

History
- Launched: 17 March 2006; 20 years ago
- Former names: NTV-Plus Nash Futbol (2006-2013); Nash Football (2013-2018)

Links
- Website: https://matchpremier.ru/

Match Premier Channel (Russian: «Матч Премьер») is a Russian sports channel, focused on the Russian Premier League. The channel was founded on March 17, 2006 as "NTV-Plus Nash Futbol" («НТВ-Плюс Наш футбол»). Since July 20, 2012 until August 31, 2015, LIGA TV company was the owner. Since July 12, 2013 until July 27, 2018 the channel was called Nash Football («Наш футбол»), and was part of the NTV Plus network before being acquired by Gazprom Media as part of Match TV Channel (Матч ТВ).

== See also ==
- Russian Football Union
