= Maksim Dmitriyev =

Russian footballer

Personal information
- Full name: Maksim Andreyevich Dmitriyev
- Date of birth: 25 June 2001 (age 25)
- Place of birth: Prokopyevsk, Russia
- Height: 1.84 m (6 ft 1/2 in)
- Position: Forward

Team information
- Current team: Tyumen
- Number: 21

Youth career
- 2018–2019: SShOR-Kemerovo

Senior career*
Years	Team	Apps	(Gls)
2020–2022	Tom Tomsk	49	(3)
2022	SKA-Khabarovsk	10	(0)
2022	SKA-Khabarovsk-2	17	(5)
2023	Krasnoye Znamya Noginsk	22	(5)
2024	Oryol	25	(10)
2025–2026	Kuban-Holding	33	(17)
2026–	Tyumen	13	(1)
- * Club domestic league appearances and goals as of 17 October 2026

Maksim Andreyevich Dmitriyev (Russian: Максим Андреевич Дмитриев; born 25 June 2001) is a Russian football player who plays for Tyumen.

== Club career ==
He made his debut in the Russian Football National League for Tom Tomsk on 22 August 2020 in a game against Dynamo Bryansk.
