= Dmitri Sadov =

Russian footballer

Personal information
- Full name: Dmitri Alekseyevich Sadov
- Date of birth: 21 March 1997 (age 29)
- Place of birth: Lytkarino, Russia
- Height: 1.84 m (6 ft 0 in)
- Positions: Right midfielder; right back

Team information
- Current team: FC Veles Moscow
- Number: 88

Youth career
- FC Lokomotiv Moscow

Senior career*
Years	Team	Apps	(Gls)
2015	LFK Lokomotiv Moscow		
2016–2017	FC Solyaris Moscow	22	(6)
2017–2018	FC Fakel Voronezh	16	(0)
2019–2020	FC Veles Moscow	9	(1)
2020	FC Tyumen	13	(1)
2021	FC Znamya Noginsk	13	(4)
2021	FC Dynamo Vladivostok	6	(1)
2022	FC Avangard Kursk	9	(2)
2022–2024	FC Chayka Peschanokopskoye	63	(4)
2024–2026	FC Spartak Kostroma	55	(5)
2026–	FC Veles Moscow	0	(0)
- * Club domestic league appearances and goals as of 16 May 2026

Dmitri Alekseyevich Sadov (Russian: Дмитрий Алексеевич Садов; born 21 March 1997) is a Russian football player who plays for FC Veles Moscow.

== Club career ==
He made his debut in the Russian Professional Football League for FC Solyaris Moscow on 20 July 2016 in a game against FSK Dolgoprudny.

He made his Russian Football National League debut for FC Fakel Voronezh on 22 July 2017 in a game against FC Dynamo Saint Petersburg.
