= Linar Sharifullin =

Russian footballer

Personal information
- Full name: Linar Dinarovich Sharifullin
- Date of birth: 24 October 2001 (age 25)
- Height: 1.84 m (6 ft 0 in)
- Position: Midfielder

Team information
- Current team: FC Neftekhimik Nizhnekamsk
- Number: 19

Senior career*
Years	Team	Apps	(Gls)
2020–	FC Neftekhimik Nizhnekamsk	16	(0)
2022–2023	→ FC Tyumen (loan)	23	(2)
2024	→ FC Irtysh Omsk (loan)	18	(2)
2025	→ FC Mashuk-KMV Pyatigorsk (loan)	16	(0)
2025	→ FC Amkar Perm (loan)	4	(0)
2025–2026	→ FC Mashuk-KMV Pyatigorsk (loan)	26	(0)
- * Club domestic league appearances and goals as of 13 June 2026

Linar Dinarovich Sharifullin (Russian: Линар Динарович Шарифуллин; born 24 October 2001) is a Russian football player who plays for FC Neftekhimik Nizhnekamsk.

== Club career ==
He made his debut in the Russian Football National League for FC Neftekhimik Nizhnekamsk on 25 September 2021 in a game against FC Krasnodar-2.
