= Pavel Kuznetsov (footballer) =

Russian footballer

Personal information
- Full name: Pavel Nikolayevich Kuznetsov
- Date of birth: 12 July 2002 (age 24)
- Height: 1.80 m (5 ft 11 in)
- Position: Midfielder

Team information
- Current team: Shinnik Yaroslavl

Senior career*
| Years | Team | Apps | (Gls) |
| 2020–2025 | Shinnik Yaroslavl | 34 | (0) |
| 2024 | → Znamya Truda Orekhovo-Zuyevo (loan) | 7 | (0) |
| 2025 | → Ryazan (loan) | 9 | (0) |
- * Club domestic league appearances and goals as of 1 November 2025

Pavel Nikolayevich Kuznetsov (Russian: Павел Николаевич Кузнецов; born 12 July 2002) is a Russian football player.

== Club career ==
He made his debut in the Russian Football National League for Shinnik Yaroslavl on 9 October 2020 in a game against Dynamo Bryansk.
