= FC Veles Moscow =

Veles Moscow
- Full name: Football Club Veles Moscow
- Founded: 2016
- Ground: Avangard Stadium, Domodedovo, Trud Stadium Podolsk
- Capacity: 5503, 11962
- Chairman: Yevgeny Shilenkov
- Manager: Aleksei Stukalov
- League: Russian First League
- 2025–26: Russian Second League, Division A, Gold Group, Second stage: 4th (promoted through play-offs)
- Website: fc-veles.ru
Home colours	Away colours

FC Veles Moscow (Russian: ФК «Велес» Москва) is a Russian football team based in Moscow. "Veles" was founded in 2016 based on the Savelovskaya football school and entered amateur competitions. The club is private, funded by the founders. The title sponsor is Veles Capital.

== History ==
For 2017–18 season, it received the license for the third-tier Russian Professional Football League. On 15 May 2020, the 2019–20 PFL season was abandoned due to COVID-19 pandemic in Russia. As Veles was leading in their PFL zone at the time, they were promoted to the second-tier FNL for the 2020–21 season. Veles was relegated back to the third tier at the end of the 2022–23 season.

Veles was promoted back to Russian First League for the 2026–27 season.

== Current squad ==
As of 11 September 2026, according to the First League website.

Note: Flags indicate national team as defined under FIFA eligibility rules; some limited exceptions apply. Players may hold more than one non-FIFA nationality.

No.	Pos.	Nation	Player
3	DF	RUS	Vladislav Volkov
5	DF	RUS	Artur Koloskov
6	MF	RUS	Islam Melikov
7	FW	UKR	Artur Murza
8	FW	RUS	Zakhar Tarasenko
9	FW	RUS	Karim Girayev
10	MF	RUS	Muslim Bammatgereyev
11	MF	RUS	Kirill Korolkov
13	GK	RUS	Bogdan Markov
17	DF	RUS	Pavel Kotov
18	MF	RUS	Dmitry Sergeyev
21	MF	RUS	Ionafan Sapozhnikov
22	MF	RUS	Yuri Zavezyon

No.	Pos.	Nation	Player
23	DF	RUS	Kirill Skvortsov
40	DF	RUS	Aleksandr Bezchasnyuk
41	GK	RUS	Sergei Samok
70	DF	RUS	Matvey Zakharzhevsky
76	GK	RUS	Ilya Kuptsov
77	MF	RUS	Oleg Smirnov
80	DF	RUS	Mikhail Rybalko
87	MF	RUS	Ivan Nikin
88	MF	RUS	Dmitri Sadov
90	MF	RUS	Vladislav Galkin
94	MF	RUS	Dmitry Kuchugura
97	MF	RUS	Aleksandr Shubin
99	MF	RUS	Nuri Abdokov (on loan from Fakel Voronezh)
