= 2020–21 PFC Sochi season =

PFC Sochi
2020–21 season
- Chairman: Dmitry Rubashko
- Manager: Vladimir Fedotov
- Stadium: Fisht Olympic Stadium
- Premier League: 5th
- Russian Cup: Quarterfinal vs Lokomotiv Moscow
- Top goalscorer: League: Christian Noboa (12); All: Christian Noboa (12)
- Highest home attendance: 10,767 vs CSKA Moscow (18 April 2021)
- Lowest home attendance: 0 vs Lokomotiv Moscow (31 October 2020)
- Average home league attendance: 5,507 (7 May 2021)
Home colours	Away colours

The 2020–21 PFC Sochi season was Sochi's second season in the Russian Premier League, the highest tier of association football in Russia, and their third season as a club. Sochi finished the season in 5th position, qualifying for the UEFA Europa Conference League for the first time, and reached the Quarterfinals of the Russian Cup where they were eliminated by eventual champions Lokomotiv Moscow.

== Season events ==
On 7 August, Emanuel Mammana moved to Sochi on a season-long loan deal from Zenit St.Petersburg.

On 23 August, Sochi and Rostov agreed a swap deal with Ivelin Popov joining Sochi and Dmitry Poloz returning to Rostov.

== Squad ==
As of 25 February 2021

Note: Flags indicate national team as defined under FIFA eligibility rules; some limited exceptions apply. Players may hold more than one non-FIFA nationality.

No.	Pos.	Nation	Player
1	GK	RUS	Denis Adamov
3	DF	RUS	Elmir Nabiullin
5	MF	RUS	Aleksey Pomerko
6	MF	RUS	Artur Yusupov
7	MF	RUS	Danil Prutsev
9	FW	RUS	Anton Zabolotny
10	FW	RUS	Maksim Barsov
12	GK	RUS	Nikolai Zabolotny
13	DF	RUS	Sergei Terekhov (on loan from Orenburg)
15	MF	RUS	Ibragim Tsallagov
16	MF	ECU	Christian Noboa
17	FW	CRO	Marko Dugandžić
18	FW	RUS	Nikita Burmistrov

No.	Pos.	Nation	Player
20	DF	RUS	Igor Yurganov
22	FW	BRA	Joãozinho
23	DF	SLO	Miha Mevlja
24	DF	ARG	Emanuel Mammana (on loan from Zenit St. Petersburg)
25	DF	RUS	Ivan Novoseltsev
27	DF	RUS	Kirill Zaika
34	DF	RUS	Timofei Margasov
35	GK	RUS	Soslan Dzhanayev (captain)
45	DF	SRB	Ivan Miladinović
71	MF	BUL	Ivelin Popov
79	FW	RUS	Aleksandr Rudenko (on loan from Spartak Moscow)
87	DF	RUS	Danila Prokhin (on loan from Zenit St. Petersburg)
98	MF	ARM	Erik Vardanyan

=== Out on loan ===
Note: Flags indicate national team as defined under FIFA eligibility rules; some limited exceptions apply. Players may hold more than one non-FIFA nationality.

No.	Pos.	Nation	Player
8	MF	RUS	Nikita Koldunov (at Zenit St.Petersburg)
21	FW	KAZ	Akmal Bakhtiyarov (at Zhetysu)
54	MF	RUS	Anatoli Nemchenko (at Olimp-Dolgoprudny)

No.	Pos.	Nation	Player
90	DF	RUS	Pavel Shakuro (at Irtysh Omsk)
—	MF	NGR	Muhammad Ladan (at Pyunik)
—	FW	RUS	Viktor Morozov (at Olimp-Dolgoprudny)

== Transfers ==
=== In ===
Date	Position	Nationality	Name	From	Fee	Ref.
4 August 2020	DF	(Russia)	Timofei Margasov	Lokomotiv Moscow	Undisclosed	
11 August 2020	MF	(Brazil)	Joãozinho	Dynamo Moscow	Free	
23 August 2020	MF	(Bulgaria)	Ivelin Popov	Rostov	Swap	
2 September 2020	MF	(Russia)	Danil Prutsev	Krylia Sovetov	Undisclosed	
7 September 2020	MF	(Russia)	Artur Yusupov	Dynamo Moscow	Free	
14 October 2020	FW	(Croatia)	Marko Dugandžić	Botoșani	Undisclosed	
25 February 2021	GK	(Russia)	Denis Adamov	Krasnodar	Undisclosed	

=== Loans in ===
Date from	Position	Nationality	Name	From	Date to	Ref.
25 July 2020	FW	(Russia)	Aleksandr Rudenko	Spartak Moscow	End of season	
6 August 2020	DF	(Russia)	Sergei Terekhov	Orenburg	End of season	
7 August 2020	DF	(Argentina)	Emanuel Mammana	Zenit St.Petersburg	End of season	
22 February 2021	DF	(Russia)	Danila Prokhin	Zenit St.Petersburg	End of season	

=== Out ===
Date	Position	Nationality	Name	To	Fee	Ref.
23 August 2020	FW	(Russia)	Dmitry Poloz	Rostov	Swap	
25 January 2021	DF	(Russia)	Nikita Kalugin	Neftekhimik Nizhnekamsk	Undisclosed	
25 February 2021	MF	(Russia)	Andrei Bokovoy	Veles Moscow	Undisclosed	

=== Loans out ===
Date from	Position	Nationality	Name	To	Date to	Ref.
29 July 2020	MF	(Nigeria)	Muhammad Ladan	Pyunik	End of season	
30 July 2020	DF	(Russia)	Pavel Shakuro	Irtysh Omsk	End of season	
22 January 2021	MF	(Russia)	Anatoli Nemchenko	Olimp-Dolgoprudny	End of season	
12 February 2021	MF	(Russia)	Nikita Koldunov	Zenit St.Petersburg	End of season	
9 March 2021	MF	(Kazakhstan)	Akmal Bakhtiyarov	Zhetysu	End of season	

== Competitions ==
=== Overview ===
Competition	First match	Last match	Starting round	Record							
Competition	First match	Last match	Starting round	Pld	W	D	L	GF	GA	GD	Win %
Premier League	9 August 2020	May 2021	Matchday 1	30	15	8	7	49	33	+16	50.00
Russian Cup	2020		Round of 32	3	2	1	0	4	2	+2	66.67
Total				33	17	9	7	53	35	+18	51.52

Last updated: 16 May 2021
Source: Competitions

=== Premier League ===
==== League table ====
Pos	Team	Pld	W	D	L	GF	GA	GD	Pts	Qualification or relegation
3	Lokomotiv Moscow	30	17	5	8	45	35	+10	56	Qualification for the Europa League group stage (Note: FC Lokomotiv Moscow qualified for the Europa League group stage by winning the 2020–21 Russian Cup. The Europa Conference League spot awarded to the third-placed team is passed to fourth-placed team, and the spot awarded to the fourth-placed team is passed to fifth-placed team.)
4	Rubin Kazan	30	16	5	9	42	33	+9	53 (Note: Head-to-head points: Rubin 3, Sochi 3. Overall matches won: Rubin 16, Sochi 15.)	Qualification for the Europa Conference League third qualifying round
5	Sochi	30	15	8	7	49	33	+16	53	Qualification for the Europa Conference League second qualifying round
6	CSKA Moscow	30	15	5	10	51	33	+18	50 (Note: Head-to-head points: CSKA 3, Dynamo 3. Head-to-head goal difference: CSKA +1, Dynamo -1.)	
7	Dynamo Moscow	30	15	5	10	44	33	+11	50	

Source: Premier Liga
Rules for classification: 1) Points; 2) Head-to-head points; 3) Head-to-head matches won; 4) Head-to-head goal difference; 5) Head-to-head goals scored; 6) Matches won; 7) Goal difference; 8) Goals scored; 9) Play-off.

==== Results summary ====
Overall								Home						Away					
Pld	W	D	L	GF	GA	GD	Pts	W	D	L	GF	GA	GD	W	D	L	GF	GA	GD
30	15	8	7	49	33	+16	53	10	4	1	31	12	+19	5	4	6	18	21	−3

Last updated: 16 May 2021.
Source: See Results

==== Results by round ====
Round	1	2	3	4	5	6	7	8	9	10	11	12	13	14	15	16	17	18	19	20	21	22	23	24	25	26	27	28	29	30
Ground	A	H	H	A	A	H	A	A	H	H	A	A	H	H	A	A	H	H	H	H	A	A	H	A	H	A	H	A	H	A
Result	D	D	W	W	W	D	W	L	D	W	L	L	W	D	D	L	W	W	W	W	D	L	W	L	L	W	W	W	W	D
Position	8	9	7	3	3	3	2	4	5	4	6	7	6	5	6	8	7	6	4	3	4	5	4	7	7	7	4	5	5	5

Updated to match(es) played on 16 May 2021. Source: See Results
A = Away; H = Home; W = Win; D = Draw; L = Loss

==== Results ====
9 August 2020 1	Spartak Moscow	2–2	Sochi	Moscow
20:00 MSK (UTC+3)	Sobolev 8' (yellow card) 8'; Larsson 10' (yellow card) 74'; Král (yellow card) 84'; Maksimenko (yellow card) 90'	Report	Poloz 15' (pen.); Terkhov (yellow card) 40'; Margasov (yellow card) 82'; Noboa 90' (pen.)	Stadium: Otkritie Arena; Attendance: 9,738; Referee: Vasili Kazartsev

14 August 2020 2	Sochi	1–1	Khimki	Sochi
19:00 MSK (UTC+3)	Poloz (yellow card) 23'; Terekhov (yellow card) 31'; Noboa 63'	Report	Troshechkin 24'; Dyadyun (yellow card) 49'; Polyarus (yellow card) 51'; Bozhenov (yellow card) 55'	Stadium: Fisht Olympic Stadium; Attendance: 3,613; Referee: Sergei Karasev

18 August 2020 3	Sochi	3–2	Rubin Kazan	Sochi
18:00 MSK (UTC+3)	Mevlja 44'; Noboa 86'; Miladinović 90+1'; Bakhtiyarov (yellow card) 90+3'; Mammana (yellow card) 90+4'	Report	Begić (yellow card) 12'; Samoshnikov (yellow card) 42'; Ignatyev 68' (pen.); Makarov 77'; Uremović (yellow card) 90'	Stadium: Fisht Olympic Stadium; Attendance: 4,271; Referee: Vladislav Bezborodov

22 August 2020 4	Rotor Volgograd	1–2	Sochi	Volgograd
20:00 MSK (UTC+3)	Mullin 52'; Serchenkov (yellow card) 55'; Mikeltadze (yellow card) 83'; Kozhemyakin (yellow card) 90+1'; Stepanov (yellow card) 90+3'	Report	Burmistrov 21', 59'; Noboa (yellow card) 65'	Stadium: Volgograd Arena; Attendance: 14,077; Referee: Sergey Ivanov

25 August 2020 5	Tambov	0–1	Sochi	Saransk
18:30 MSK (UTC+3)	Onugkha (yellow card) 79'; Oyewole (yellow card) 90+3'	Report	Margasov (yellow card) 62'; Noboa 90+2'	Stadium: Mordovia Arena; Attendance: 2,100; Referee: Aleksei Matyunin
Note: Match played at the Mordovia Arena in Saransk instead of Tambov's regular Spartak Stadium.

30 August 2020 6	Sochi	0–0	Ural Yekaterinburg	Sochi
20:00 MSK (UTC+3)	Terekhov (yellow card) 50'	Report	Yevseyev (yellow card) 79'	Stadium: Fisht Olympic Stadium; Attendance: 3,942; Referee: Mikhail Vilkov

12 September 2020 7	Akhmat Grozny	0–1	Sochi	Grozny
19:00 MSK (UTC+3)		Report	Noboa 24'; Burmistrov (yellow card) 39'; Margasov (yellow card) 90+'	Stadium: Akhmat-Arena; Attendance: 6,084; Referee: Vitali Meshkov

20 September 2020 8	Arsenal Tula	3–2	Sochi	Tula
14:00 MSK (UTC+3)	Sokol (yellow card) 6'; Lutsenko (yellow card) 9'; E.Kangwa (yellow card) 16' (goal) 45'; Tkachyov 21', 71'	Report	Noboa 10' (pen.); Margasov (yellow card) 29'; Zaika (yellow card) 54'; Mevlja 65'; Tsallagov 69'	Stadium: Arsenal Stadium; Attendance: 5,028; Referee: Evgeny Kukulyak

26 September 2020 9	Sochi	1–1	Krasnodar	Sochi
20:00 MSK (UTC+3)	Noboa 4' (pen.) (yellow card) 47'; A.Zabolotny (yellow card) 27'; Yusupov (yellow card) 45+'; Zaika (yellow card) 53' (yellow-red card) 55'; Terekhov (yellow card) 85'	Report	Petrov (yellow card) 4' (goal) 59'; Olsson (yellow card) 17'; Smolnikov (yellow card) 89'	Stadium: Fisht Olympic Stadium; Attendance: 7,641; Referee: Sergei Karasev

4 October 2020 10	Sochi	4–2	Rostov	Sochi
16:30 MSK (UTC+3)	Burmistrov 19'; Noboa (yellow card) 63'; Yusupov 66'; A.Zabolotny 78', 84'	Report	Normann (yellow card) 33' (yellow-red card) 63'; Hadžikadunić (yellow card) 36'; Osipenko (yellow card) 56'; Poloz (yellow card) 59' (goal) 74'; Ionov 62'; Hashimoto (yellow card) 78'; Dolgov (yellow card) 90'	Stadium: Fisht Olympic Stadium; Attendance: 6,199; Referee: Evgeny Turbin

17 October 2020 11	Zenit St.Petersburg	3–1	Sochi	Saint Petersburg
14:00 MSK (UTC+3)	Karavayev 16'; Yerokhin 24'; Rakitskiy (yellow card) 33'; Douglas 90+'	Report	Mammana (yellow card) 23'; Zaika 57' (yellow card) 73'; Yusupov (yellow card) 90+'	Stadium: Krestovsky Stadium; Attendance: 21,231; Referee: Sergey Ivanov

24 October 2020 12	Dynamo Moscow	3–1	Sochi	Moscow
14:00 MSK (UTC+3)	Lesovoy 11'; Szymański 26'; Ordets (yellow card) 28'; Komlichenko (yellow card) 45+'; Kaboré (yellow card) 48'; Grulyov (yellow card) 49'; Fomin 55'	Report	Mevlja 22'; Miladinović (yellow card) 35'; Yusupov (yellow card) 38'; Tsallagov (yellow card) 44' (yellow-red card) 87'	Stadium: VTB Arena; Attendance: 4,535; Referee: Alexey Sukhoi

31 October 2020 13	Sochi	2–1	Lokomotiv Moscow	Sochi
19:00 MSK (UTC+3)	A.Zabolotny 14'; Burmistrov 40'; Mevlja (yellow card) 55'; Miladinović (yellow card) 70'; Dzhanayev (yellow card) 73'; Terekhov (yellow card) 78'	Report	Eder (yellow card) 16'; Rybus (yellow card) 27'; Miranchuk 65'; Kulikov (yellow card) 73'; Murilo (yellow card) 73'	Stadium: Fisht Olympic Stadium; Referee: Stanislav Vasiliev

6 November 2020 14	Sochi	1–1	Ufa	Sochi
19:00 MSK (UTC+3)	Terekhov 53'; Miladinović (yellow card) 79'	Report	Morozov (yellow card) 13'; Andrić 87' (pen.)	Stadium: Fisht Olympic Stadium; Attendance: 3,963; Referee: Nikolay Voloshin

22 November 2020 15	CSKA Moscow	1–1	Sochi	Moscow
14:00 MSK (UTC+3)	Sigurðsson 5'; Maradishvili (yellow card) 69'; Akhmetov (yellow card) 71'; Gaich (yellow card) 90+'	Report	Burmistrov 23'; Joãozinho (yellow card) 32'; Yusupov (yellow card) 80'	Stadium: VEB Arena; Attendance: 5,012; Referee: Evgeny Kukulyak

29 November 2020 16	Ural Yekaterinburg	1–0	Sochi	Yekaterinburg
12:00 MSK (UTC+3)	Kalinin (yellow card) 1'; Rykov (yellow card) 7'; Yevseyev 86'; Pomazun (yellow card) 90+'	Report	Terekhov (yellow card) 20' (yellow-red card) 45+'; Burmistrov (yellow card) 22'; A.Zabolotny (yellow card) 90+'	Stadium: Central Stadium; Attendance: 2,058; Referee: Stanislav Vasiliev

7 December 2020 17	Sochi	2–0	Akhmat Grozny	Sochi
19:00 MSK (UTC+3)	Dugandžić 31' (yellow card) 43'; Yusupov 45+'; Mammana (yellow card) 49'; Margasov (yellow card) 60'	Report	Berisha (penalty missed) 17'; Nenakhov (yellow card) 41'	Stadium: Fisht Olympic Stadium; Attendance: 2,663; Referee: Sergey Lapochkin

12 December 2020 18	Sochi	1–0	Spartak Moscow	Sochi
16:30 MSK (UTC+3)	Mammana (yellow card) 9'; Terekhov (yellow card) 26'; Dugandžić (yellow card) 50'; Noboa 57'; A.Zabolotny (yellow card) 65'; Zaika (yellow card) 83'	Report	Král (yellow card) 32'; Umyarov (yellow card) 81'; Ayrton (yellow card) 90+'	Stadium: Fisht Olympic Stadium; Attendance: 10,747; Referee: Igor Panin

16 December 2020 19	Sochi	2–0	Dynamo Moscow	Sochi
18:00 MSK (UTC+3)	Dugandžić (yellow card) 44'; A.Zabolotny 52'; Yusupov 70'	Report	Yevgenyev (yellow card) 16' (yellow-red card) 64'	Stadium: Fisht Olympic Stadium; Attendance: 2,685; Referee: Vitali Meshkov

27 February 2021 20	Sochi	4–0	Arsenal Tula	Sochi
19:00 MSK (UTC+3)	A.Zabolotny 51'; Terekhov 53'; Joãozinho 58'; Yusupov 67'; Zaika (yellow card) 81'	Report	Dovbnya (yellow card) 41'; Grigalava (yellow card) 68'; Tkachyov (yellow card) 86'	Stadium: Fisht Olympic Stadium; Attendance: 3,311; Referee: Mikhail Vilkov

6 March 2021 21	Rostov	0–0	Sochi	Rostov-on-Don
19:00 MSK (UTC+3)	Gigović (yellow card) 28'; Hadžikadunić (yellow card) 37'	Report	A.Zabolotny (yellow card) 40'; Terekhov (yellow card) 63'; Noboa (yellow card) 71'; Novoseltsev (yellow card) 85'; Burmistrov (red card) 90+'; Tsallagov (yellow card) 90+'	Stadium: Rostov Arena; Attendance: 12,580; Referee: Vasily Kazartsev

14 March 2021 22	Lokomotiv Moscow	3–1	Sochi	Moscow
19:00 MSK (UTC+3)	Rybchinsky (yellow card) 7'; Kamano 42', 56'; Zhemaletdinov (yellow card) 83'; Smolov 88'	Report	Prutsev (yellow card) 45+'; Yusupov 58'; Miladinović (yellow card) 90+'	Stadium: RZD Arena; Attendance: 6,839; Referee: Aleksei Matyunin

19 March 2021 23	Sochi	5–0	Tambov	Sochi
19:00 MSK (UTC+3)	Novoseltsev (yellow card) 25'; A.Zabolotny (yellow card) 31' (goal) 45+', 80'; Terekhov 55'; Mevlja (yellow card) 62'; Rudenko 74'; Barsov 90'	Report	Shakhov (yellow card) 2'; Klimov (yellow card) 12'	Stadium: Fisht Olympic Stadium; Attendance: 3,147; Referee: Artyom Lyubimov

3 April 2021 24	Rubin Kazan	1–0	Sochi	Kazan
16:30 MSK (UTC+3)	Zotov (yellow card) 38'; Samoshnikov (yellow card) 45'; Kvaratskhelia 72' (yellow card) 90+'; Zuyev (yellow card) 84'	Report	Noboa (yellow card) 3'; Tsallagov (yellow card) 33'; A.Zabolotny (yellow card) 57'; Miladinović (yellow card) 90+'	Stadium: Ak Bars Arena; Attendance: 6,511; Referee: Vladislav Bezborodov

11 April 2021 25	Sochi	1–2	Zenit St.Petersburg	Sochi
16:30 MSK (UTC+3)	Prokhin (yellow card) 38'; Burmistrov 58'; Rudenko (yellow card) 85'; Miladinović (yellow card) 90+'	Report	Barrios (yellow card) 42'; Azmoun 63', 80'	Stadium: Fisht Olympic Stadium; Attendance: 9,328; Referee: Vladimir Moskalyov

18 April 2021 26	Sochi	2–1	CSKA Moscow	Sochi
16:30 MSK (UTC+3)	Noboa 40' (pen.); Burmistrov (yellow card) 50'; Yusupov 55'; Mevlja (yellow card) 77'; N.Zabolotny (yellow card) 85'; Dugandžić (yellow card) 88'	Report	Diveyev 79'; Sigurðsson (yellow card) 81'; Dzagoev (yellow card) 90+1'	Stadium: Fisht Olympic Stadium; Attendance: 10,767; Referee: Stanislav Vasiliev

25 April 2021 27	Ufa	2–3	Sochi	Ufa
14:00 MSK (UTC+3)	Krotov (yellow card) 19'; Mrzljak (yellow card) 50'; Jokić (yellow card) 54' (red card) 90+'; Kamilov (yellow card) 59'; Zhamaletdinov 78'; Ivanov (yellow card) 82'	Report	Prokhin 8'; Tsallagov (yellow card) 9' (yellow-red card) 45'; A.Zabolotny 14'; Noboa (yellow card) 52' (goal) 90+' (pen.); Miladinović (yellow card) 61'	Stadium: Neftyanik Stadium; Attendance: 7,232; Referee: Igor Panin

1 May 2021 28	Krasnodar	1–3	Sochi	Krasnodar
19:00 MSK (UTC+3)	Stotsky (yellow card) 5' (goal) 59'; Cabella (yellow card) 49' (yellow-red card) 79'	Report	Noboa 5' (pen.), 90+'; Prutsev (yellow card) 14'; Terekhov (yellow card) 61'; Yusupov (yellow card) 80'; A.Zabolotny 86'	Stadium: Krasnodar Stadium; Attendance: 17,590; Referee: Ivan Sidenkov

7 May 2021 29	Sochi	2–1	Rotor Volgograd	Sochi
20:00 MSK (UTC+3)	Rudenko 9'; Mevlja (yellow card) 66'; Yusupov 90+'	Report	Shchotkin 30'; Zhigulyov (yellow card) 41'; Makarov (yellow card) 65'; Davitashvili (yellow card) 84'	Stadium: Fisht Olympic Stadium; Attendance: 7,340; Referee: Sergei Karasev

16 May 2021 30	Khimki	0–0	Sochi	Khimki
14:00 MSK (UTC+3)	Konaté (yellow card) 18'	Report	Prutsev (yellow card) 73'	Stadium: Arena Khimki; Attendance: 5,450; Referee: Sergey Ivanov

=== Russian Cup ===
==== Round of 32 ====
Pos	Team	Pld	W	OTW	OTL	L	GF	GA	GD	Pts	Qualification
1	Orenburg	2	1	0	1	0	4	1	+3	4	Advance to Play-off
2	Sochi	2	1	1	0	0	2	1	+1	5	
3	Zvezda Perm	2	0	0	0	2	0	4	−4	0	

16 September 2020 1	Zvezda Perm	0–1	Sochi	Perm
17:00 MSK (UTC+3)	Ryabokobylenko (yellow card) 44'; D.Zuyev (yellow card) 57'	Report	Prutsev (yellow card) 10'; Yusupov (yellow card) 12' (goal) 20'; Nemchenko (yellow card) 89'	Stadium: Zvezda Stadium; Referee: Artyom Petrenko

21 October 2020 2	Orenburg	1 – 1 (a.e.t.) (2–4 p)	Sochi	Orenburg
17:00 MSK (UTC+3)	Arty.Yusupov 20'; Gojković (yellow card) 43'; Bolotov (yellow card) 46'; Vorobyov (penalty missed) 71'; Khoroshkov (yellow card) 85'	Report	Dugandžić 31' (pen.); Novoseltsev (yellow card) 42' (yellow-red card) 70'; Rudenko (yellow card) 55'; Margasov (yellow card) 79'	Stadium: Gazovik Stadium; Referee: Yan Bobrovsky
	Penalties
	Arty.Yusupov (penalty missed); Prudnikov (penalty missed); Mironov (penalty scored); Kozlov (penalty scored)		A.Zabolotny (penalty scored); Miladinović (penalty scored); Artu.Yusupov (penalty scored); Margasov (penalty scored)

==== Knockout stage ====
21 February 2021 Round of 16	Krasnodar	1 – 2	Sochi	Krasnodar
17:00 MSK (UTC+3)	Ionov (yellow card) 15'; Gazinsky (yellow card) 43'; Olsson (yellow card) 54'; Berg (yellow card) 54'; Vilhena 81'	Report	Terekhov (yellow card) 44'; A.Zabolotny 52'; Joãozinho 67'	Stadium: Krasnodar Stadium; Attendance: 7,896; Referee: Evgeny Kukulyak

7 April 2021 Quarterfinal	Sochi	1 – 3	Lokomotiv Moscow	Sochi
19:00 MSK (UTC+3)	Zaika (yellow card) 18' (yellow-red card) 50'; Miladinović (yellow card) 56'; Yusupov 70'	Report	Smolov 44', 63'; Mukhin (yellow card) 53'; Guilherme (yellow card) 62'; Rybus (yellow card) 78'; Kamano 90+6'	Stadium: Fisht Olympic Stadium; Attendance: 8,487; Referee: Vasily Kazartsev

== Squad statistics ==
As of match played 16 May 2021

=== Appearances and goals ===
No.	Pos	Nat	Player	Total		Premier League		Russian Cup	
No.	Pos	Nat	Player	Apps	Goals	Apps	Goals	Apps	Goals
1	GK	(Russia) RUS	Denis Adamov	1	0	0	0	1	0
3	DF	(Russia) RUS	Elmir Nabiullin	19	0	7+9	0	2+1	0
6	MF	(Russia) RUS	Artur Yusupov	27	9	22+1	7	3+1	2
7	MF	(Russia) RUS	Danil Prutsev	22	0	4+16	0	2	0
9	FW	(Russia) RUS	Anton Zabolotny	30	10	21+6	9	2+1	1
10	MF	(Russia) RUS	Maksim Barsov	5	1	0+4	1	0+1	0
12	GK	(Russia) RUS	Nikolai Zabolotny	11	0	9	0	2	0
13	DF	(Russia) RUS	Sergei Terekhov	31	3	27	3	2+2	0
15	DF	(Russia) RUS	Ibragim Tsallagov	30	0	24+2	0	4	0
16	MF	(Ecuador) ECU	Christian Noboa	27	12	25	12	2	0
17	FW	(Croatia) CRO	Marko Dugandžić	17	2	4+10	1	1+2	1
18	MF	(Russia) RUS	Nikita Burmistrov	24	6	19+2	6	1+2	0
20	DF	(Russia) RUS	Igor Yurganov	1	0	0	0	1	0
22	MF	(Brazil) BRA	Joãozinho	25	2	21+2	1	1+1	1
23	DF	(Slovenia) SLO	Miha Mevlja	31	3	29	3	2	0
24	DF	(Argentina) ARG	Emanuel Mammana	19	0	14+4	0	1	0
25	DF	(Russia) RUS	Ivan Novoseltsev	16	0	11+4	0	1	0
27	DF	(Russia) RUS	Kirill Zaika	26	1	16+7	1	3	0
34	DF	(Russia) RUS	Timofei Margasov	27	0	22+1	0	3+1	0
35	GK	(Russia) RUS	Soslan Dzhanayev	22	0	21	0	1	0
45	DF	(Serbia) SRB	Ivan Miladinović	28	1	18+6	1	4	0
71	MF	(Bulgaria) BUL	Ivelin Popov	1	0	0+1	0	0	0
73	MF	(Russia) RUS	Yegor Prutsev	1	0	0+1	0	0	0
79	FW	(Russia) RUS	Aleksandr Rudenko	24	2	7+13	2	2+2	0
87	DF	(Russia) RUS	Danila Prokhin	7	1	6+1	1	0	0
98	MF	(Armenia) ARM	Erik Vardanyan	1	0	0+1	0	0	0
Players away from the club on loan:
8	MF	(Russia) RUS	Nikita Koldunov	1	0	0	0	0+1	0
21	MF	(Kazakhstan) KAZ	Akmal Bakhtiyarov	2	0	0+1	0	1	0
54	MF	(Russia) RUS	Anatoli Nemchenko	4	0	0+2	0	0+2	0
Players who appeared for Sochi but left during the season:
7	FW	(Russia) RUS	Dmitry Poloz	3	1	3	1	0	0
26	DF	(Russia) RUS	Nikita Kalugin	3	0	0+1	0	1+1	0
58	MF	(Russia) RUS	Andrei Bokovoy	3	0	0+2	0	1	0

=== Goal scorers ===
Place	Position	Nation	Number	Name	Premier League	Russian Cup	Total
1	MF	(Ecuador)	16	Christian Noboa	12	0	12
2	FW	(Russia)	9	Anton Zabolotny	9	1	10
2	MF	(Russia)	6	Artur Yusupov	7	2	9
4	MF	(Russia)	18	Nikita Burmistrov	6	0	6
5	DF	(Slovenia)	23	Miha Mevlja	3	0	3
5	DF	(Russia)	13	Sergei Terekhov	3	0	3
7	FW	(Russia)	79	Aleksandr Rudenko	2	0	2
7	FW	(Croatia)	17	Marko Dugandžić	1	1	2
7	MF	(Brazil)	22	Joãozinho	1	1	2
10	FW	(Russia)	7	Dmitry Poloz	1	0	1
10	DF	(Serbia)	45	Ivan Miladinović	1	0	1
10	DF	(Russia)	27	Kirill Zaika	1	0	1
10	MF	(Russia)	10	Maksim Barsov	1	0	1
10	DF	(Russia)	87	Danila Prokhin	1	0	1
Total					49	5	54

=== Clean sheets ===
Place	Position	Nation	Number	Name	Premier League	Russian Cup	Total
1	GK	(Russia)	35	Soslan Dzhanayev	8	0	8
2	GK	(Russia)	12	Nikolai Zabolotny	2	1	3
Total					10	1	11

=== Disciplinary record ===
Number	Nation	Position	Name	Premier League		Russian Cup		Total	
Number	Nation	Position	Name	Booked	Sent off (straight red)	Booked	Sent off (straight red)	Booked	Sent off (straight red)
6	(Russia)	MF	Artur Yusupov	5	0	1	0	6	0
7	(Russia)	MF	Danil Prutsev	3	0	1	0	4	0
9	(Russia)	FW	Anton Zabolotny	6	0	0	0	6	0
12	(Russia)	GK	Nikolai Zabolotny	1	0	0	0	1	0
13	(Russia)	DF	Sergei Terekhov	10	1	1	0	11	1
15	(Russia)	DF	Ibragim Tsallagov	7	2	0	0	7	2
16	(Ecuador)	MF	Christian Noboa	6	0	0	0	6	0
17	(Croatia)	FW	Marko Dugandžić	4	0	0	0	4	0
18	(Russia)	MF	Nikita Burmistrov	3	1	0	0	3	1
22	(Brazil)	MF	Joãozinho	1	0	0	0	1	0
23	(Slovenia)	DF	Miha Mevlja	4	0	0	0	4	0
24	(Argentina)	DF	Emanuel Mammana	4	0	0	0	4	0
25	(Russia)	DF	Ivan Novoseltsev	2	0	2	1	4	1
27	(Russia)	DF	Kirill Zaika	4	1	2	1	6	2
34	(Russia)	DF	Timofei Margasov	5	0	1	0	6	0
35	(Russia)	GK	Soslan Dzhanayev	1	0	0	0	1	0
45	(Serbia)	DF	Ivan Miladinović	8	0	1	0	9	0
79	(Russia)	FW	Aleksandr Rudenko	1	0	1	0	2	0
87	(Russia)	DF	Danila Prokhin	1	0	0	0	1	0
Players away on loan:
21	(Kazakhstan)	MF	Akmal Bakhtiyarov	1	0	0	0	1	0
54	(Russia)	MF	Anatoli Nemchenko	0	0	1	0	1	0
Players who left Sochi during the season:
7	(Russia)	FW	Dmitry Poloz	1	0	0	0	1	0
Total				78	5	11	2	89	7
