= Danila Prokhin =

Russian footballer (born 2001)

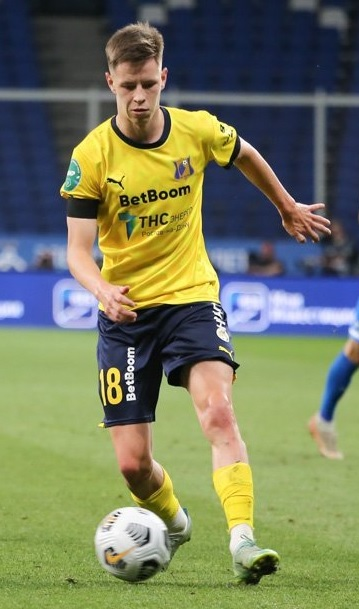
- Prokhin with Rostov in 2022

Personal information
- Full name: Danila Andreyevich Prokhin
- Date of birth: 24 May 2001 (age 25)
- Place of birth: Kirishi, Russia
- Height: 1.86 m (6 ft 1 in)
- Position: Defensive midfielder

Team information
- Current team: Rostov
- Number: 27

Youth career
- Fakel Kirishi
- 2011–2018: Zenit Saint Petersburg

Senior career*
Years	Team	Apps	(Gls)
2019–2020	Zenit-2 Saint Petersburg	22	(1)
2019–2021	Zenit Saint Petersburg	8	(0)
2021	→ Sochi (loan)	7	(1)
2021–	Rostov	54	(1)
2021–2022	→ Sochi (loan)	25	(0)
2023–2025	→ Orenburg (loan)	34	(0)

International career^{‡}
2017	Russia U16	4	(0)
2017–2018	Russia U17	13	(0)
2019	Russia U18	11	(2)
2019–2020	Russia U19	7	(2)
2020–2021	Russia U21	9	(1)
- * Club domestic league appearances and goals as of 8 November 2026 ‡ National team caps and goals as of 16 November 2021

Danila Andreyevich Prokhin (Russian: Дани́ла Андре́евич Про́хин; born 24 May 2001) is a Russian football player who plays as a defensive midfielder for Rostov.

== Club career ==
He made his debut in the Russian Football National League for Zenit-2 St. Petersburg on 13 April 2019 in a game against Baltika Kaliningrad.

He made his debut for the senior squad of Zenit on 30 October 2019 in a Russian Cup game against Tom Tomsk. He made his Russian Premier League debut for the club on 11 July 2020 in a game against Akhmat Grozny, as a starter.

On 22 February 2021, he joined Sochi on loan until the end of the 2021–22 season.

On 5 June 2021, Rostov bought out his rights from Zenit St. Petersburg and he signed a long-term contract with Rostov. For the 2021–22 season, he was loaned back to Sochi.

On 27 December 2023, Prokhin moved to Orenburg on loan with an option to buy. On 27 June 2024, the loan was extended for the 2024–25 season.

== International career ==
Prokhin was first called up to the Russia national football team for September 2023 camp.

== Career statistics ==
=== Club ===
As of match played 8 November 2026

Appearances and goals by club, season and competition
Club	Season	League			Cup		Europe		Total	
Club	Season	Division	Apps	Goals	Apps	Goals	Apps	Goals	Apps	Goals
Zenit-2 Saint Petersburg	2018–19	Russian First League	4	1	—		—		4	1
Zenit-2 Saint Petersburg	2019–20	Russian Second League	12	0	—		—		12	0
Zenit-2 Saint Petersburg	2020–21	Russian Second League	6	0	—		—		6	0
Zenit-2 Saint Petersburg	Total		22	1	0	0	0	0	22	1
Zenit Saint Petersburg	2019–20	Russian Premier League	3	0	1	0	0	0	4	0
Zenit Saint Petersburg	2020–21	Russian Premier League	5	0	0	0	2	0	7	0
Zenit Saint Petersburg	Total		8	0	1	0	2	0	11	0
Sochi (loan)	2020–21	Russian Premier League	7	1	0	0	—		7	1
Sochi (loan)	2021–22	Russian Premier League	25	0	1	0	4	1	30	1
Rostov	2022–23	Russian Premier League	19	1	6	0	—		25	1
Rostov	2023–24	Russian Premier League	10	0	5	0	—		15	0
Rostov	2025–26	Russian Premier League	14	0	6	0	—		20	0
Rostov	2026–27	Russian Premier League	11	0	4	3	—		15	3
Rostov	Total		54	1	21	3	0	0	75	4
Orenburg (loan)	2023–24	Russian Premier League	9	0	3	0	—		12	0
Orenburg (loan)	2024–25	Russian Premier League	25	0	4	0	—		29	0
Orenburg (loan)	Total		34	0	7	0	—		41	0
Career total			150	3	30	3	6	1	186	7

== Honours ==
Zenit Saint Petersburg

- Russian Premier League: 2019–20, 2020–21
- Russian Cup: 2019–20
