= Daniil Pavlov =

Russian footballer

Personal information
- Full name: Daniil Yevgenyevich Pavlov
- Date of birth: 5 June 2002 (age 24)
- Place of birth: Tula, Russia
- Height: 1.79 m (5 ft 10 in)
- Position: Centre-forward

Youth career
- –2019: Arsenal Tula
- 2019–2022: Sochi

Senior career*
Years	Team	Apps	(Gls)
2021–2024	Sochi	4	(0)
2022	→ Dynamo Brest (loan)	10	(0)
2022–2023	→ Tyumen (loan)	17	(2)
2023	→ Arsenal-2 Tula (loan)	14	(2)
2024–2025	Avangard Kursk	49	(5)
2025–2026	Volgar Astrakhan	8	(0)
2026	Arsenal-2 Tula	15	(3)
- * Club domestic league appearances and goals

Daniil Yevgenyevich Pavlov (Russian: Даниил Евгеньевич Павлов; born 5 June 2002) is a Russian former football player who played as a centre-forward.

== Club career ==
Pavlov made his Russian Premier League debut for Sochi on 26 July 2021 in a game against Nizhny Novgorod. He substituted Timofei Margasov in the 85th minute.

On 14 July 2026, Pavlov announced a "pause" in his playing career.

== Career statistics ==
As of 13 December 2021

Club	Season	League			Cup		Continental		Total	
Club	Season	Division	Apps	Goals	Apps	Goals	Apps	Goals	Apps	Goals
Sochi	2021–22	RPL	4	0	0	0	0	0	4	0
Career total			4	0	0	0	0	0	4	0
