= 2021–22 PFC Sochi season =

PFC Sochi
2021–22 season
- Owner: Boris Rotenberg
- General director: Dmitry Rubashko
- Head coach: Vladimir Fedotov
- Stadium: Fisht Olympic Stadium
- Premier League: 2nd
- Russian Cup: Round of 16 vs CSKA Moscow
- UEFA Europa Conference League: Third qualifying round vs Partizan
- Top goalscorer: League: Mateo Cassierra (14); All: Mateo Cassierra (14)
- Highest home attendance: 10,307 vs Zenit St.Petersburg (3 April 2022)
- Lowest home attendance: 0 vs Keşla (22 July 2021); 0 vs CSKA Moscow (2 March 2022)
- Average home league attendance: 3,693 (13 May 2022)
Home colours	Away colours	Third colours
- All statistics correct as of 7 December 2021.

The 2021–22 PFC Sochi season was Sochi's third season in the Russian Premier League, the highest tier of association football in Russia, and their fourth season as a club. Sochi finished the season in 2nd position, were knocked out of the Russian Cup at the Round of 16 stage by CSKA Moscow, and the Third qualifying round of the UEFA Europa Conference League by Partizan.

== Squad ==
As of match played 21 May 2022

No.	Name	Nationality	Position	Date of birth (age)	Signed from	Signed in	Contract ends	Apps.	Goals
Goalkeepers
1	Denis Adamov	(Russia)	GK	20 February 1998 (aged 24)	Krasnodar	2021		11	0
12	Nikolai Zabolotny	(Russia)	GK	16 April 1990 (aged 32)	Rotor Volgograd	2018		62	0
35	Soslan Dzhanayev	(Russia)	GK	3 March 1987 (aged 35)	Miedź Legnica	2019		60	0
Defenders
3	Vanja Drkušić	(Slovenia)	DF	30 October 1999 (aged 22)	Bravo	2022		11	0
5	Rodrigão	(Brazil)	DF	11 September 1995 (aged 26)	Gil Vicente	2021		31	3
13	Sergey Terekhov	(Russia)	DF	27 June 1990 (aged 31)	Orenburg	2021		61	7
17	Artyom Makarchuk	(Russia)	DF	9 November 1995 (aged 26)	Baltika Kaliningrad	2022		10	2
20	Igor Yurganov	(Russia)	DF	10 December 1993 (aged 28)	Dynamo St.Petersburg	2018		67	3
27	Kirill Zaika	(Russia)	DF	7 October 1992 (aged 29)	Khimki	2018		85	3
34	Timofei Margasov	(Russia)	DF	12 June 1992 (aged 29)	Lokomotiv Moscow	2020		89	2
87	Danila Prokhin	(Russia)	DF	24 May 2001 (aged 20)	loan from Rostov	2021		37	2
Midfielders
6	Artur Yusupov	(Russia)	MF	1 September 1989 (aged 32)	Dynamo Moscow	2020		57	17
8	Ivelin Popov	(Bulgaria)	MF	26 October 1987 (aged 34)	Rostov	2020		26	5
15	Ibragim Tsallagov	(Russia)	MF	12 December 1990 (aged 31)	Zenit St.Petersburg	2019		92	1
16	Christian Noboa	(Ecuador)	MF	9 April 1985 (aged 37)	Zenit St.Petersburg	2019		75	26
18	Nikita Burmistrov	(Russia)	MF	6 July 1989 (aged 32)	Rotor Volgograd	2018		111	12
19	Victorien Angban	(Ivory Coast)	MF	29 September 1996 (aged 25)	Metz	2021		29	1
22	Joãozinho	(Brazil)	MF	25 December 1988 (aged 33)	Dynamo Moscow	2020		47	5
Forwards
7	Dmitry Vorobyov	(Russia)	FW	28 November 1997 (aged 24)	loan from Orenburg	2021		13	0
9	Georgi Melkadze	(Russia)	FW	4 April 1997 (aged 25)	Spartak Moscow	2022		14	2
30	Mateo Cassierra	(Colombia)	FW	13 April 1997 (aged 25)	Belenenses SAD	2021		23	14
Away on loan
4	Mateo Barać	(Croatia)	DF	20 July 1994 (aged 27)	Rapid Wien	2021		14	0
10	Maksim Barsov	(Russia)	FW	29 April 1993 (aged 29)	Dynamo St.Petersburg	2018		52	23
53	Daniil Pavlov	(Russia)	FW	5 June 2002 (aged 19)	Arsenal Tula	2019		4	0
	Sergey Samok	(Russia)	GK	15 February 2001 (aged 21)	CSKA Moscow	2019		0	0
	Ivan Miladinović	(Serbia)	DF	14 August 1994 (aged 27)	Radnički Niš	2018		83	3
	Vadim Milyutin	(Russia)	DF	8 April 2002 (aged 20)	Academy	2019		1	0
	Anatoli Nemchenko	(Russia)	MF	22 August 2000 (aged 21)	Kuban-Holding Pavlovskaya	2019		4	0
	Maksim Kolmakov	(Russia)	MF	5 January 2003 (aged 19)	Dynamo Brest	2019		1	0
	Yegor Prutsev	(Russia)	MF	23 December 2002 (aged 19)	Academy	2019		1	0
Players that left Sochi during the season
9	Marko Dugandžić	(Croatia)	FW	7 April 1994 (aged 28)	Botoșani	2020		24	5
24	Emanuel Mammana	(Argentina)	DF	10 February 1996 (aged 26)	loan from Zenit St.Petersburg	2021		24	0
90	Pavel Shakuro	(Russia)	DF	25 July 1997 (aged 24)	Tyumen	2020		3	0
	Erik Vardanyan	(Armenia)	MF	7 June 1998 (aged 23)	Pyunik	2020		1	0

== Transfers ==
=== In ===
Date	Position	Nationality	Name	From	Fee	Ref.
2 June 2021	DF	(Russia)	Sergey Terekhov	Orenburg	Undisclosed	
19 June 2021	DF	(Croatia)	Mateo Barać	Rapid Wien	Undisclosed	
1 July 2021	DF	(Brazil)	Rodrigão	Gil Vicente	Undisclosed	
3 July 2021	MF	(Ivory Coast)	Victorien Angban	Metz	Undisclosed	
26 August 2021	FW	(Colombia)	Mateo Cassierra	Belenenses SAD	Undisclosed	
24 January 2022	DF	(Slovenia)	Vanja Drkušić	Bravo	Undisclosed	
25 January 2022	FW	(Russia)	Georgi Melkadze	Spartak Moscow	Undisclosed	
8 February 2022	DF	(Russia)	Artyom Makarchuk	Baltika Kaliningrad	Undisclosed	

=== Loans in ===
Date from	Position	Nationality	Name	From	Date to	Ref.
5 July 2021	DF	(Russia)	Danila Prokhin	Sochi	End of season	
19 July 2021	DF	(Argentina)	Emanuel Mammana	Zenit St.Petersburg	7 January 2022	
19 July 2021	FW	(Russia)	Dmitry Vorobyov	Orenburg	End of season	

=== Out ===
Date	Position	Nationality	Name	To	Fee	Ref.
11 January 2022	FW	(Croatia)	Marko Dugandžić	CFR Cluj	Undisclosed	
15 February 2022	DF	(Russia)	Pavel Shakuro	Yenisey Krasnoyarsk	Undisclosed	
15 February 2022	DF	(Russia)	Dmitry Kumsarov	Krasava	Undisclosed	
17 February 2022	MF	(Armenia)	Erik Vardanyan	Urartu	Undisclosed	
31 May 2022	DF	(Croatia)	Mateo Barać	Krylia Sovetov	Undisclosed	

=== Loans out ===
Date from	Position	Nationality	Name	From	Date to	Ref.
12 January 2022	MF	(Russia)	Maksim Kolmakov	Dynamo Brest	End of season	
15 February 2022	MF	(Russia)	Daniil Pavlov	Dynamo Brest	End of season	
16 February 2022	MF	(Russia)	Yegor Prutsev	Neftekhimik Nizhnekamsk	End of season	
19 February 2022	DF	(Croatia)	Mateo Barać	Krylia Sovetov	End of season	
20 February 2022	FW	(Russia)	Maksim Barsov	Baltika Kaliningrad	End of season	

=== Released ===
Date	Position	Nationality	Name	Joined	Date	Ref.
30 June 2022	MF	(Bulgaria)	Ivelin Popov	Levski Sofia	1 July 2022	

== Friendlies ==
11 July 2021 Premier Cup	Spartak Moscow (Russia)	4–0	(Russia) Sochi	Moscow, Russia
17:00 MSK (UTC+3)	Bakayev 6'; Mirzov 38'; Sobolev 62'; Moses 83'	Report		Stadium: Otkrytiye Arena

14 July 2021	Khimki (Russia)	2–3	(Russia) Sochi	Khimki, Russia
15:00 MSK (UTC+3)				Stadium: Arena Khimki

17 July 2021	Rubin Kazan (Russia)	1–3	(Russia) Sochi	Khimki, Russia
15:00 MSK (UTC+3)				Stadium: Arena Khimki

== Competitions ==
=== Overview ===
Competition	First match	Last match	Starting round	Final position	Record							
Competition	First match	Last match	Starting round	Final position	Pld	W	D	L	GF	GA	GD	Win %
Premier League	26 July 2021	21 May 2022	Matchday 1	2nd	30	17	5	8	54	30	+24	56.67
Russian Cup	2 March 2022	2 March 2022	Round of 16	Round of 16	1	0	0	1	1	2	−1	0.00
UEFA Europa Conference League	22 July 2021	12 August 2021	Second qualifying round	Third qualifying round	4	2	2	0	10	5	+5	50.00
Total					35	19	7	9	65	37	+28	54.29

Last updated: 21 May 2022
Source: Soccerway

=== Premier League ===
==== League table ====
Pos	Team	Pld	W	D	L	GF	GA	GD	Pts
1	Zenit Saint Petersburg (C)	30	19	8	3	66	28	+38	65
2	Sochi	30	17	5	8	54	30	+24	56
3	Dynamo Moscow	30	16	5	9	53	41	+12	53
4	Krasnodar	30	14	8	8	42	30	+12	50 (Note: Head-to-head points: Krasnodar 4, CSKA Moscow 1.)
5	CSKA Moscow	30	15	5	10	42	29	+13	50

Source: Premier Liga
Rules for classification: 1) Points; 2) Head-to-head points; 3) Head-to-head matches won; 4) Head-to-head goal difference; 5) Head-to-head goals scored; 6) Matches won; 7) Goal difference; 8) Goals scored; 9) 2020–21 position (not applicable to final standings); 10) Play-off.
(C) Champions

==== Results summary ====
Overall								Home						Away					
Pld	W	D	L	GF	GA	GD	Pts	W	D	L	GF	GA	GD	W	D	L	GF	GA	GD
30	17	5	8	54	30	+24	56	8	3	4	29	16	+13	9	2	4	25	14	+11

Last updated: 21 May 2022.
Source: FBref

==== Results by round ====
Round	1	2	3	4	5	6	7	8	9	10	11	12	13	14	15	16	17	18	19	20	21	22	23	24	25	26	27	28	29	30
Ground	A	A	H	H	A	A	H	H	A	A	H	A	А	H	Н	А	H	H	H	A	A	H	H	A	H	H	A	A	H	A
Result	L	W	W	W	L	W	W	L	L	W	W	L	W	W	L	D	L	W	W	W	D	L	D	W	D	W	W	W	D	W
Position	8	6	6	5	5	4	2	4	6	3	2	6	3	2	3	3	4	3	3	3	4	4	4	4	4	4	3	3	3	2

Updated to match(es) played on 21 May 2022. Source: Premier Liga
A = Away; H = Home; W = Win; D = Draw; L = Loss

==== Results ====
26 July 2021 1	Nizhny Novgorod	1 – 0	Sochi	Nizhny Novgorod
19:00 MSK (UTC+3)	Kakkoyev (yellow card) 15'; Gorbunov 68'; Sapeta (yellow card) 77'	Report	Popov (yellow card) 75'	Stadium: Nizhny Novgorod Stadium; Attendance: 487; Referee: Pavel Shadyhanov

2 August 2021 2	Akhmat Grozny	1 – 2	Sochi	Grozny
20:00 MSK (UTC+3)	Lystsov (yellow card) 14'; Iancu 86'	Report	Utkin 26' (o.g.); Dugandžić (yellow card) 30' (goal) 59'; Noboa (yellow card) 90'; Popov (yellow card) 90+'	Stadium: Akhmat-Arena; Attendance: 11,318; Referee: Ivan Sidenkov

9 August 2021 3	Sochi	2 – 0	Ural Yekaterinburg	Sochi
19:00 MSK (UTC+3)	Popov 8'; Burmistrov (yellow card) 59'; Noboa 71' (pen.)	Report	Miškić (yellow card) 63'; Gerasimov (yellow card) 70'	Stadium: Fisht Olympic Stadium; Attendance: 467; Referee: Kirill Levnikov

16 August 2021 4	Sochi	3 – 0	Khimki	Sochi
19:00 MSK (UTC+3)	Barsov 17'; Popov 54', 75'	Report	Šabović (yellow card) 79'	Stadium: Fisht Olympic Stadium; Attendance: 491; Referee: Vladislav Bezborodov

21 August 2021 5	Krylia Sovetov	1 – 0	Sochi	Samara
20:00 MSK (UTC+3)	Sergeyev 33'; Prutsev (yellow card) 39'	Report	Dzhanayev (yellow card) FT	Stadium: Solidarnost Arena; Attendance: 1,556; Referee: Anton Frolov

26 August 2021 6	Spartak Moscow	1 – 2	Sochi	Moscow
18:30 MSK (UTC+3)	Zobnin (yellow card) 38' (goal) 60'; Sobolev (yellow card) 90+'; Hendrix (yellow card) 90+'	Report	Angban (yellow card) 34'; Margasov (yellow card) 39'; Rodrigão (yellow card) 41'; Barsov 66'; Yusupov 72'; Dzhanayev (yellow card) 90+'	Stadium: Otkritie Arena; Attendance: 2,713; Referee: Vitali Meshkov

12 September 2021 7	Sochi	3 – 1	Ufa	Sochi
16:30 MSK (UTC+3)	Margasov (yellow card) 6'; Cassierra 11'; Noboa 35'; Barać (yellow card) 59'; Terekhov (yellow card) 89'; Joãozinho 90+3'	Report	Agalarov 50'; Zhuravlyov (red card) 83'	Stadium: Fisht Olympic Stadium; Attendance: 498; Referee: Aleksey Sukhoy

19 September 2021 8	Sochi	0 – 1	Dynamo Moscow	Sochi
19:00 MSK (UTC+3)		Report	Zakharyan 12'	Stadium: Fisht Olympic Stadium; Attendance: 498; Referee: Vasily Kazartsev

26 September 2021 9	Krasnodar	3 – 0	Sochi	Krasnodar
19:00 MSK (UTC+3)	Spertsyan 3'; Cabella 21'; Claesson (yellow card) 34'; Spajić (red card) 40'; Chernikov (yellow card) 54' (yellow-red card) 75'; Krychowiak 64' (pen.)	Report	Rodrigão (yellow card) 44'; Burmistrov (yellow card) 45'; Prokhin (yellow card) 84'; Yurganov (yellow card) 88'	Stadium: Krasnodar Stadium; Attendance: 10,554; Referee: Igor Panin

3 October 2021 10	Zenit St.Petersburg	1 – 2	Sochi	Saint Petersburg
16:30 MSK (UTC+3)	Azmoun (red card) 42'; Dzyuba 45'	Report	Terekhov (yellow card) 44' (goal) 71'; Zaika (yellow card) 63'; Cassierra 67' (yellow card) 90+'; Noboa (yellow card) 90+'	Stadium: Krestovsky Stadium; Attendance: 12,762; Referee: Pavel Shadykhanov

16 October 2021 11	Sochi	3 – 2	Rostov	Sochi
19:00 MSK (UTC+3)	Yusupov 10'; Noboa 28' (pen.); Burmistrov (yellow card) 32'; Cassierra 33'; Prokhin (yellow card) 82'	Report	Kalinin (yellow card) 6'; Bastos (yellow card) 23' (goal) 53'; Gigović (yellow card) 58'; Sowe 90+'	Stadium: Fisht Olympic Stadium; Attendance: 4,735; Referee: Evgeny Kukulyak

25 October 2021 12	Lokomotiv Moscow	2 – 1	Sochi	Moscow
19:00 MSK (UTC+3)	Rybus (yellow card) 24'; Yurganov 41' (o.g.); Jedvaj 49'; Beka Beka (yellow card) 56'; Pablo (yellow card) 90+2'	Report	Noboa (yellow card) 30'; Prokhin (yellow card) 50'; Terekhov (yellow card) 69'; Joãozinho 90+3'	Stadium: RZD Arena; Attendance: 3,857; Referee: Vladislav Bezborodov

31 October 2021 13	Arsenal Tula	1 – 2	Sochi	Tula
16:30 MSK (UTC+3)	Čaušić (yellow card) 56'; E.Kangwa 65'	Report	Cassierra 2', 79'; Yusupov (yellow card) 75'; Prokhin (yellow card) 84'; Zaika (yellow card) 88'	Stadium: Arsenal Stadium; Referee: Pavel Shadyhanov

6 November 2021 14	Sochi	4 – 1	CSKA Moscow	Sochi
19:00 MSK (UTC+3)	Zaika (yellow card) 3'; Yusupov 4'; Cassierra 14', 16'; Yurganov 87'	Report	Zaynutdinov 57'	Stadium: Fisht Olympic Stadium; Attendance: 7,628; Referee: Sergey Ivanov

21 November 2021 15	Sochi	1 – 2	Rubin Kazan	Sochi
19:30 MSK (UTC+3)	Zaika (yellow card) 22'; Rodrigão 27'; Yurganov (red card) 59'	Report	Abildgaard (yellow card) 24' (yellow-red card) 61' (goal) 31'; Zuyev (yellow card) 26'; Onugkha (yellow card) 78'; Dreyer 81'; Ignatyev (yellow card) 84'	Stadium: Fisht Olympic Stadium; Attendance: 3,731; Referee: Alexey Matyunin

27 November 2021 16	Ural Yekaterinburg	1 – 1	Sochi	Yekaterinburg
14:00 MSK (UTC+3)	Bicfalvi (yellow card) 27'; Augustyniak 34'	Report	Terekhov (yellow card) 43'; Cassierra (yellow card) 47'; Barać (yellow card) 62' (yellow-red card) 74'; Noboa 68'	Stadium: Central Stadium; Attendance: 1,390; Referee: Artyom Lyubimov

5 December 2021 17	Sochi	1 – 2	Krasnodar	Sochi
19:00 MSK (UTC+3)	Cassierra 17'; Prokhin (yellow card) 34'	Report	Claesson 22' (pen.), 52'; Ramírez (yellow card) 26'; Chernikov (yellow card) 74'; Vilhena (yellow card) 79'; Krychowiak (red card) 87'	Stadium: Fisht Olympic Stadium; Attendance: 4,521; Referee: Sergei Karasev

13 December 2021 18	Sochi	3 – 0	Spartak Moscow	Sochi
19:00 MSK (UTC+3)	Noboa 28' (pen.) (red card) 66'; Yusupov (yellow card) 36' (goal) 90+7' (pen.); Prokhin (yellow card) 45+3'; Tsallagov (yellow card) 48'; Popov 89' (yellow card) 90+3'; Adamov (yellow card) 90+1'	Report	Ignatov (yellow card) 27'; Gigiot (yellow card) 79'; Bakayev (yellow card) 90'; Caufriez (red card) 90+6'	Stadium: Fisht Olympic Stadium; Attendance: 9,298; Referee: Sergey Ivanov

26 February 2021 19	Sochi	2 – 0	Arsenal Tula	Sochi
16:30 MSK (UTC+3)	Zaika (yellow card) 9'; Angban 50'; Prokhin (yellow card) 59'; Rodrigão (yellow card) 62'; Yusupov 77' (pen.)	Report	Markov (yellow card) 10'; Belyayev (yellow card) 27'; Stepanov (yellow card) 45+'	Stadium: Fisht Olympic Stadium; Attendance: 3,234; Referee: Vladislav Bezborodov

7 March 2022 20	Rostov	0 – 1	Sochi	Rostov-on-Don
16:30 MSK (UTC+3)	Silyanov (yellow card) 81'; Melyokhin (yellow card) 82'; Osipenko (yellow card) 90+1'; Pesyakov (yellow card) 90+8'	Report	Cassierra (yellow card) 13'; Melkadze (yellow card) 85'; Noboa 90+2' (pen.)	Stadium: Rostov Arena; Attendance: 14,564; Referee: Igor Panin

13 March 2022 21	Khimki	0 – 0	Sochi	Khimki
14:00 MSK (UTC+3)	Lamkel Zé (yellow card) 9'; Mirzov (yellow card) 20'; Glavčić (yellow card) 60'; Bozhenov (yellow card) 62'; Šabović (yellow card) 64'; Rudenko (yellow card) 90+'	Report	Drkušić (yellow card) 48'; Yusupov (yellow card) 56' (penalty missed) 63'	Stadium: Arena Khimki; Attendance: 503; Referee: Aleksei Matyunin

20 March 2022 22	Sochi	2 – 3	Krylia Sovetov	Sochi
16:30 MSK (UTC+3)	Tsallagov (yellow card) 18'; Burmistrov (yellow card) 30'; Terekhov (yellow card) 52' (yellow-red card) 64'; Melkadze 80' (yellow card) 90+'; Makarchuk 83'	Report	Yakuba (yellow card) 39'; Glushenkov 45'; Barać (yellow card) 54'; Zinkovsky (yellow card) 68' (goal) 90+'; Gorshkov 78' (pen.); Bijl (yellow card) 83'	Stadium: Fisht Olympic Stadium; Attendance: 3,807; Referee: Artyom Lyubimov

3 April 2022 23	Sochi	0 – 0	Zenit St.Petersburg	Sochi
19:00 MSK (UTC+3)	Yurganov (yellow card) 45+1'; Melkadze (yellow card) 71'	Report	Malcom (yellow card) 42'	Stadium: Fisht Olympic Stadium; Attendance: 10,307; Referee: Vladimir Moskalyov

10 April 2022 24	Ufa	1 – 2	Sochi	Ufa
14:00 MSK (UTC+3)	Cacintura (yellow card) 72'; Agalarov 81' (pen.)	Report	Cassierra 12'; Drkušić (yellow card) 41'; Yusupov 51'	Stadium: BetBoom Arena; Attendance: 6,866; Referee: Alexey Amelin

17 April 2022 25	Sochi	2 – 2	Lokomotiv Moscow	Sochi
16:30 MSK (UTC+3)	Margasov 11' (yellow card) 90+'; Rodrigão 43' (red card) 60'	Report	Isidor 36' (pen.), 49'; Kuchta (red card) 60'	Stadium: Fisht Olympic Stadium; Attendance: 6,255; Referee: Vasily Kazartsev

23 April 2022 26	Sochi	3 – 2	Akhmat Grozny	Sochi
19:00 MSK (UTC+3)	Yusupov (yellow card) 27' (goal) 57'; Burmistrov (yellow card) 51'; Cassierra 53'; Terekhov (yellow card) 81' (goal) 84'	Report	Sadulayev 31' (yellow card) 45+'; Sebai 66'; Bogosavac (yellow card) 70'; Todorović (yellow card) 81'; Semyonov (yellow card) 89'	Stadium: Fisht Olympic Stadium; Attendance: 4,853; Referee: Kirill Levnikov

30 April 2022 27	Rubin Kazan	0 – 6	Sochi	Kazan
14:00 MSK (UTC+3)		Report	Margasov 26'; Joãozinho 42'; Cassierra 52'; Makarchuk (yellow card) 77'; Zaika 82'; Popov 84'; Melkadze 90+'	Stadium: Ak Bars Arena; Attendance: 5,180; Referee: Jan Bobrovsky

7 May 2022 28	CSKA Moscow	0 – 1	Sochi	Moscow
19:00 MSK (UTC+3)	Gbamin (yellow card) 36'; Akhmetov (red card) 90+'	Report	Makarchuk 10'; Popov (yellow card) 27'; Adamov (yellow card) 56'; Drkušić (yellow card) 57'; Prokhin (yellow card) 88'; Burmistrov (yellow card) 90+'	Stadium: VEB Arena; Attendance: 11,192; Referee: Vladislav Bezborodov

13 May 2022 29	Sochi	0 – 0	Nizhny Novgorod	Sochi
19:00 MSK (UTC+3)	Yusupov (yellow card) 60'	Report	Ennin (yellow card) 45' (yellow-red card) 47'; Yuldoshev (yellow card) 75'; Goylo (yellow card) 90+'	Stadium: Fisht Olympic Stadium; Attendance: 5,837; Referee: Kirill Levnikov

21 May 2022 30	Dynamo Moscow	1 – 5	Sochi	Moscow
17:00 MSK (UTC+3)	Noboa 8' (o.g.); Lesovoy (red card) 57'; Yevgenyev (yellow card) 90+'	Report	Yusupov 27'; Cassierra 33', 40', 68'; Terekhov (yellow card) 45+'; Noboa 45+' (pen.); Margasov (yellow card) 59'	Stadium: VTB Arena; Attendance: 25,018; Referee: Vladimir Moskalyov

=== Russian Cup ===
2 March 2022 Round of 16	Sochi	1 – 2	CSKA Moscow	Sochi
19:00 MSK (UTC+3)	Margasov (yellow card) 7'; Noboa 41'; Terekhov (yellow card) 70'; Prokhin (yellow card) 75'; Popov (yellow card) 77'	Report	Akinfeev (yellow card) 39'; Diveyev 60', 87'; Mukhin (yellow card) 90'	Stadium: Fisht Olympic Stadium; Referee: Sergey Ivanov

=== UEFA Europa Conference League ===
==== Qualifying rounds ====
===== Second qualifying round =====
The draw for the second qualifying round was held on 16 June 2021.

22 July 2021 First leg	Sochi (Russia)	3–0	(Azerbaijan) Keşla	Sochi, Russia
19:00 MSK (UTC+3)	Rodrigão 10'; Noboa 67' (pen.); Barsov 81'	Report	Gigauri (yellow card) 18'; Qirtimov (yellow card) 45'; Guliyev (yellow card) 90+5'	Stadium: Fisht Olympic Stadium; Attendance: 0 Referee: Enea Jorgji (Albania)

29 July 2021 Second leg	Keşla (Azerbaijan)	2–4 (2–7 agg.)	(Russia) Sochi	Keshla, Azerbaijan
20:00 AZT (UTC+4)	Felipe Santos 35'; Hajiyev 52'; Neto (yellow card) 68'; Akhundov (yellow card) 78'	Report	Dugandžić 21', 82'; Burmistrov 38'; Prokhin 70'	Stadium: ASK Arena; Attendance: 870; Referee: Viktor Shimusik (Belarus)

===== Third qualifying round =====
The draw for the third qualifying round was held on 19 July 2021.

5 August 2021 First leg	Sochi (Russia)	1–1	(Serbia) Partizan	Sochi, Russia
19:00 MSK (UTC+3)	Barać (yellow card) 43'; Noboa 66' (pen.); Prokhin (yellow card) 71'	Report	Urošević (yellow card) 35'; Vujačić (yellow card) 63'; Marković (yellow card) 65'; Natkho (yellow card) 67'; Gomes 73'	Stadium: Fisht Olympic Stadium; Attendance: 308; Referee: Dumitri Muntean (Moldova)

12 August 2021 Second leg	Partizan (Serbia)	2–2 (a.e.t.) (3–3 agg.) (4–2 p)	(Russia) Sochi	Belgrade, Serbia
21:00 CEST (UTC+2)	Marković (yellow card) 32'; Jojić 55'; Šćekić 90'	Report	Terekhov 33', 76'; Popov (yellow card) 57'; Margasov (yellow card) 102'	Stadium: Partizan Stadium; Attendance: 13,131; Referee: Jakob Kehlet (Denmark)
	Penalties
	Živković (penalty scored); Gomes (penalty scored); Soumah (penalty scored); Vujačić (penalty scored)		(penalty missed) Tsallagov; (penalty scored) Vorobyev; (penalty scored) Joãozinho; (penalty missed) Rodrigão

== Squad statistics ==
As of match played 21 May 2022

=== Appearances and goals ===
No.	Pos	Nat	Player	Total		Premier League		Russian Cup		UEFA Europa Conference League	
No.	Pos	Nat	Player	Apps	Goals	Apps	Goals	Apps	Goals	Apps	Goals
1	GK	(Russia) RUS	Denis Adamov	11	0	11	0	0	0	0	0
3	DF	(Slovenia) SLO	Vanja Drkušić	11	0	11	0	0	0	0	0
5	DF	(Brazil) BRA	Rodrigão	30	3	25	2	1	0	4	1
6	MF	(Russia) RUS	Artur Yusupov	29	8	22+3	8	0+1	0	2+1	0
7	FW	(Russia) RUS	Dmitry Vorobyov	13	0	5+5	0	0	0	1+2	0
8	MF	(Bulgaria) BUL	Ivelin Popov	24	5	8+12	5	0+1	0	2+1	0
9	FW	(Russia) RUS	Georgi Melkadze	13	2	1+11	2	0+1	0	0	0
12	GK	(Russia) RUS	Nikolai Zabolotny	10	0	6+1	0	0	0	3	0
13	DF	(Russia) RUS	Sergey Terekhov	29	4	21+3	2	1	0	3+1	2
15	MF	(Russia) RUS	Ibragim Tsallagov	33	0	28	0	1	0	4	0
16	MF	(Ecuador) ECU	Christian Noboa	28	10	22+2	7	1	1	3	2
17	DF	(Russia) RUS	Artyom Makarchuk	10	2	8+2	2	0	0	0	0
18	MF	(Russia) RUS	Nikita Burmistrov	30	1	14+11	0	1	0	3+1	1
19	MF	(Ivory Coast) CIV	Victorien Angban	29	1	12+12	1	1	0	1+3	0
20	DF	(Russia) RUS	Igor Yurganov	21	1	16+3	1	1	0	1	0
22	MF	(Brazil) BRA	Joãozinho	21	3	5+14	3	0+1	0	0+1	0
27	DF	(Russia) RUS	Kirill Zaika	31	1	19+8	1	0	0	2+2	0
30	FW	(Colombia) COL	Mateo Cassierra	23	14	22	14	1	0	0	0
34	DF	(Russia) RUS	Timofei Margasov	32	2	18+9	2	1	0	3+1	0
35	GK	(Russia) RUS	Soslan Dzhanayev	16	0	13+1	0	1	0	1	0
87	DF	(Russia) RUS	Danila Prokhin	29	1	18+6	0	1	0	4	1
Players away from the club on loan:
4	DF	(Croatia) CRO	Mateo Barać	14	0	10	0	0	0	3+1	0
10	FW	(Russia) RUS	Maksim Barsov	13	3	3+6	2	0	0	1+3	1
17	FW	(Russia) RUS	Maksim Kolmakov	1	0	0	0	0	0	0+1	0
53	MF	(Russia) RUS	Daniil Pavlov	4	0	0+4	0	0	0	0	0
Players who appeared for Sochi but left during the season:
9	FW	(Croatia) CRO	Marko Dugandžić	7	3	1+3	1	0	0	3	2
24	DF	(Argentina) ARG	Emanuel Mammana	4	0	0+3	0	0	0	0+1	0

=== Goal scorers ===
Place	Position	Nation	Number	Name	Premier League	Russian Cup	UEFA Europa Conference League	Total
1	FW	(Colombia)	30	Mateo Cassierra	14	0	0	14
2	MF	(Ecuador)	16	Christian Noboa	7	1	2	10
3	MF	(Russia)	6	Artur Yusupov	8	0	0	8
4	MF	(Bulgaria)	8	Ivelin Popov	5	0	0	5
4	DF	(Russia)	13	Sergey Terekhov	3	0	2	5
6	MF	(Brazil)	22	Joãozinho	3	0	0	3
6	FW	(Russia)	10	Maksim Barsov	2	0	1	3
6	DF	(Brazil)	5	Rodrigão	2	0	1	3
6	FW	(Croatia)	9	Marko Dugandžić	1	0	2	3
10	FW	(Russia)	9	Georgi Melkadze	2	0	0	2
10	DF	(Russia)	34	Timofei Margasov	2	0	0	2
10	DF	(Russia)	17	Artyom Makarchuk	2	0	0	2
13	DF	(Russia)	20	Igor Yurganov	1	0	0	1
13	MF	(Ivory Coast)	19	Victorien Angban	1	0	0	1
13	DF	(Russia)	27	Kirill Zaika	1	0	0	1
13	MF	(Russia)	18	Nikita Burmistrov	0	0	1	1
13	DF	(Russia)	87	Danila Prokhin	0	0	1	1
13				Own goal	1	0	0	1
Total					54	1	10	65

=== Clean sheets ===
Place	Nation	Number	Name	Premier League	Russian Cup	UEFA Europa Conference League	Total
1	(Russia)	1	Denis Adamov	7	0	0	7
2	(Russia)	35	Soslan Dzhanayev	4	0	0	4
3	(Russia)	12	Nikolai Zabolotny	0	0	1	1
Total				9	0	1	10

Adamov & Dzhanayev both played in Sochi's 0-0 draw against Khimki on 13 March 2022

=== Disciplinary record ===
Number	Nation	Position	Name	Premier League		Russian Cup		UEFA Europa Conference League		Total	
Number	Nation	Position	Name	Yellow card	Red card	Yellow card	Red card	Yellow card	Red card	Yellow card	Red card
1	(Russia)	GK	Denis Adamov	2	0	0	0	0	0	2	0
3	(Slovenia)	DF	Vanja Drkušić	3	0	0	0	0	0	3	0
5	(Brazil)	DF	Rodrigão	4	1	0	0	0	0	4	1
6	(Russia)	MF	Artur Yusupov	5	0	0	0	0	0	5	0
8	(Bulgaria)	MF	Ivelin Popov	4	0	1	0	1	0	6	0
9	(Russia)	FW	Georgi Melkadze	3	0	0	0	0	0	3	0
13	(Russia)	DF	Sergey Terekhov	8	1	1	0	0	0	9	1
15	(Russia)	MF	Ibragim Tsallagov	2	0	0	0	0	0	2	0
16	(Ecuador)	MF	Christian Noboa	3	1	0	0	0	0	3	1
17	(Russia)	DF	Artyom Makarchuk	1	0	0	0	0	0	1	0
18	(Russia)	MF	Nikita Burmistrov	6	0	0	0	0	0	6	0
19	(Ivory Coast)	MF	Victorien Angban	1	0	0	0	0	0	1	0
20	(Russia)	DF	Igor Yurganov	2	1	0	0	0	0	2	1
27	(Russia)	MF	Kirill Zaika	5	0	0	0	0	0	5	0
30	(Colombia)	FW	Mateo Cassierra	3	0	0	0	0	0	3	0
34	(Russia)	MF	Timofei Margasov	4	0	1	0	1	0	6	0
35	(Russia)	GK	Soslan Dzhanayev	2	0	0	0	0	0	2	0
87	(Russia)	DF	Danila Prokhin	8	0	1	0	1	0	10	0
Players away on loan:
4	(Croatia)	DF	Mateo Barać	3	1	0	0	1	0	4	1
10	(Russia)	FW	Maksim Barsov	1	0	0	0	0	0	1	0
Players who left Sochi during the season:
9	(Croatia)	FW	Marko Dugandžić	1	0	0	0	0	0	1	0
Total				71	5	4	0	4	0	79	5
