= Ibragim Tsallagov =

Russian footballer (born 1990)

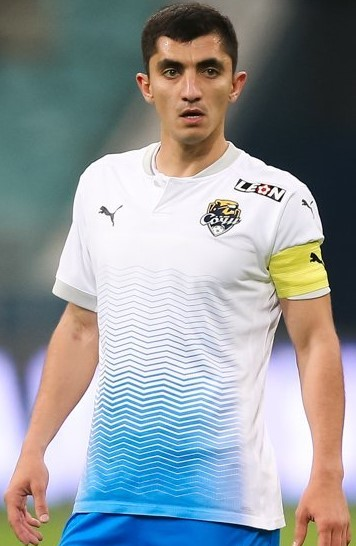
- Tsallagov with Sochi in 2021

Personal information
- Full name: Ibragim Yuryevich Tsallagov
- Date of birth: 12 December 1990 (age 35)
- Place of birth: Vladikavkaz, Russian SFSR
- Height: 1.79 m (5 ft 10 in)
- Position: Defensive midfielder

Youth career
- Alania Vladikavkaz
- Krylia Sovetov Samara

Senior career*
Years	Team	Apps	(Gls)
2010–2016	Krylia Sovetov Samara	182	(7)
2017–2019	Zenit St. Petersburg	8	(0)
2017–2018	→ Dynamo Moscow (loan)	12	(0)
2018–2019	→ Rubin Kazan (loan)	16	(0)
2019–2023	Sochi	100	(2)
2023–2026	Alania Vladikavkaz	41	(2)

International career
2009	Russia U19	4	(0)
2011–2013	Russia U21	22	(1)
- * Club domestic league appearances and goals as of 13 July 2026

Ibragim Yuryevich Tsallagov (Russian: Ибрагим Юрьевич Цаллагов; born 12 December 1990) is a Russian former professional footballer who played primarily as a defensive midfielder. He also played as a right back and right midfielder.

== Club career ==
He made his Russian Premier League debut on 13 March 2010 for FC Krylia Sovetov Samara in a game against FC Zenit St. Petersburg.

On 30 December 2016, he signed a 3.5-year contract with FC Zenit Saint Petersburg.

On 2 August 2017, he joined FC Dynamo Moscow on loan for the 2017–18 season. On 28 July 2018, he moved on loan to FC Rubin Kazan for the 2018–19 season.

On 2 July 2019, he left Zenit for PFC Sochi. Tsallagov left Sochi in June 2023.

On 23 June 2023, Tsallagov signed a three-year contract with Alania Vladikavkaz.

== Personal life ==
He is a cousin of Dzambolat Tsallagov.

== Career statistics ==
As of 27 November 2022

Club	Season	League			Cup		Continental		Other		Total	
Club	Season	Division	Apps	Goals	Apps	Goals	Apps	Goals	Apps	Goals	Apps	Goals
FC Krylia Sovetov Samara	2010	Premier League	23	1	1	0	–		–		24	1
FC Krylia Sovetov Samara	2011–12	Premier League	34	0	1	0	–		–		35	0
FC Krylia Sovetov Samara	2012–13	Premier League	16	0	1	0	–		1 (Note: Appearances in relegation play-offs)	0	18	0
FC Krylia Sovetov Samara	2013–14	Premier League	28	4	1	0	–		1	0	30	4
FC Krylia Sovetov Samara	2014–15	National League	34	1	3	1	–		–		37	2
FC Krylia Sovetov Samara	2015–16	Premier League	30	1	2	1	–		–		32	2
FC Krylia Sovetov Samara	2016–17	Premier League	17	0	2	0	–		–		19	0
FC Krylia Sovetov Samara	Total		182	7	11	2	0	0	2	0	195	9
FC Zenit Saint Petersburg	2016–17	Premier League	8	0	0	0	0	0	–		8	0
FC Zenit Saint Petersburg	2017–18	Premier League	0	0	0	0	0	0	–		0	0
FC Zenit Saint Petersburg	Total		8	0	0	0	0	0	0	0	8	0
FC Dynamo Moscow	2017–18	Premier League	12	0	1	0	–		–		13	0
FC Rubin Kazan	2018–19	Premier League	16	0	0	0	–		–		16	0
PFC Sochi	2019–20	Premier League	26	1	1	0	–		–		27	1
PFC Sochi	2020–21	Premier League	26	0	4	0	–		–		30	0
PFC Sochi	2021–22	Premier League	30	0	1	0	4	0	–		35	0
PFC Sochi	2022–23	Premier League	11	1	0	0	–		–		11	1
PFC Sochi	Total		93	2	6	0	4	0	0	0	103	2
Career total			311	9	18	2	4	0	2	0	335	11
