= Igor Yurganov =

Russian footballer

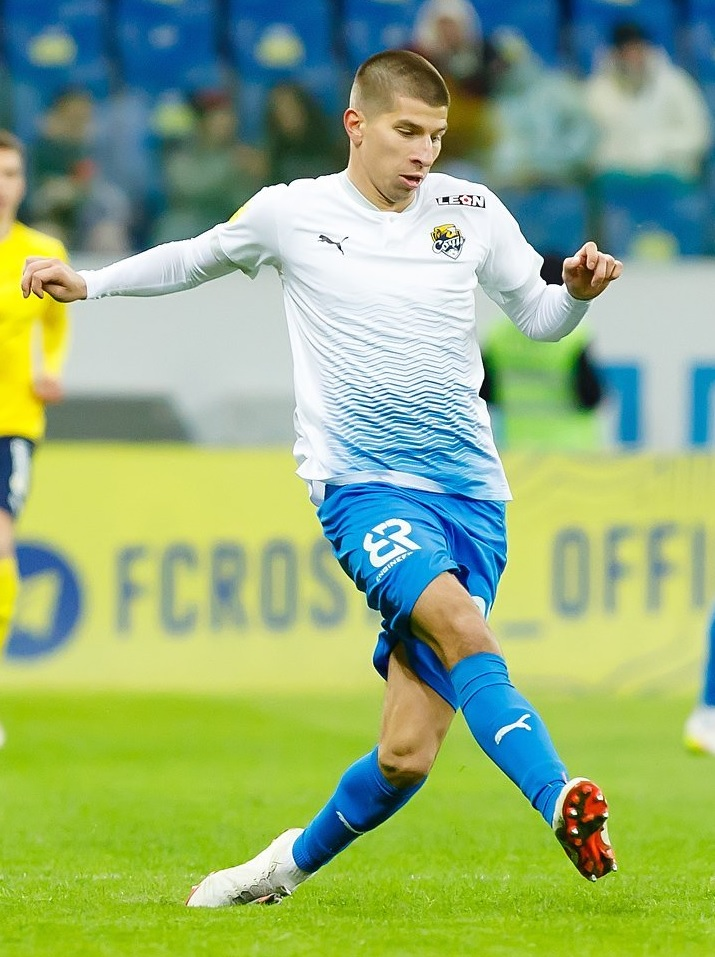
- Yurganov with Sochi in 2022

Personal information
- Full name: Igor Sergeyevich Yurganov
- Date of birth: 10 December 1993 (age 32)
- Place of birth: Rubtsovsk, Russia
- Height: 1.86 m (6 ft 1 in)
- Position: Centre-back

Team information
- Current team: Fakel Voronezh
- Number: 20

Youth career
- DYuSSh Rubtsovsk
- DYuSSh ZapSib Novokuznetsk
- Metallurg-Kuzbass Novokuznetsk

Senior career*
Years	Team	Apps	(Gls)
2011–2012	Metallurg-Kuzbass Novokuznetsk	1	(0)
2013	Irtysh Omsk	9	(2)
2013–2015	Sibir-2 Novosibirsk	44	(5)
2015–2016	Avangard Kursk	26	(3)
2016	Volgar Astrakhan	5	(0)
2017–2018	Dynamo St. Petersburg	43	(5)
2018–2024	Sochi	88	(3)
2020	→ Tambov (loan)	7	(0)
2020–2021	→ Baltika Kaliningrad (loan)	27	(4)
2024–	Fakel Voronezh	70	(1)
- * Club domestic league appearances and goals as of 21 November 2026

Igor Sergeyevich Yurganov (Russian: Игорь Серге́евич Юрганов; born 10 December 1993) is a Russian footballer who plays for Fakel Voronezh.

== Club career ==
He made his debut in the Russian Second Division for Metallurg-Kuzbass Novokuznetsk on 12 May 2012 in a game against Irtysh Omsk.

He made his debut in the Russian Premier League for Sochi on 21 July 2019 in a game against Zenit St. Petersburg.

On 7 October 2020 he joined Baltika Kaliningrad on loan for the 2020–21 season.

On 20 February 2024, Yurganov moved to Fakel Voronezh.

== Career statistics ==
As of 21 November 2026

Club	Season	League			Cup		Continental		Other		Total	
Club	Season	Division	Apps	Goals	Apps	Goals	Apps	Goals	Apps	Goals	Apps	Goals
Metallurg-Kuzbass	2011–12	Russian Second League	1	0	0	0	–		–		1	0
Irtysh Omsk	2012–13	Russian Second League	9	2	0	0	–		–		9	2
Sibir-2 Novosibirsk	2013–14	Russian Second League	20	2	0	0	–		–		20	2
Sibir-2 Novosibirsk	2014–15	Russian Second League	24	3	1	0	–		–		25	3
Sibir-2 Novosibirsk	Total		44	5	1	0	0	0	0	0	45	5
Avangard Kursk	2015–16	Russian Second League	26	3	2	0	–		–		28	3
Volgar Astrakhan	2016–17	Russian First League	5	0	1	0	–		–		6	0
Dynamo Saint Petersburg	2016–17	Russian Second League	9	0	–		–		5 (Note: Appearances in FNL Cup)	0	14	0
Dynamo Saint Petersburg	2017–18	Russian First League	34	5	3	0	–		–		37	5
Dynamo Saint Petersburg	Total		43	5	3	0	0	0	5	0	51	5
Sochi	2018–19	Russian First League	34	2	1	0	–		–		35	2
Sochi	2019–20	Russian Premier League	9	0	0	0	–		–		9	0
Sochi	2020–21	Russian Premier League	0	0	1	0	–		–		1	0
Sochi	2021–22	Russian Premier League	20	1	1	0	1 (Note: Appearance in UEFA Conference League)	0	–		22	1
Sochi	2022–23	Russian Premier League	20	0	4	1	–		–		24	1
Sochi	2023–24	Russian Premier League	5	0	4	0	–		–		9	0
Sochi	Total		88	3	11	1	1	0	0	0	100	4
Tambov (loan)	2019–20	Russian Premier League	7	0	–		–		3	0	10	0
Baltika Kaliningrad (loan)	2020–21	Russian First League	27	4	–		–		–		27	4
Fakel Voronezh	2023–24	Russian Premier League	10	0	–		–		–		10	0
Fakel Voronezh	2024–25	Russian Premier League	20	0	3	0	–		–		23	0
Fakel Voronezh	2025–26	Russian First League	31	1	3	0	–		–		34	1
Fakel Voronezh	2026–27	Russian Premier League	9	0	4	0	–		–		13	0
Fakel Voronezh	Total		70	1	10	0	0	0	0	0	80	1
Career total			320	23	28	1	1	0	8	0	357	24
