= Artyom Makarchuk =

Russian footballer (born 1995)

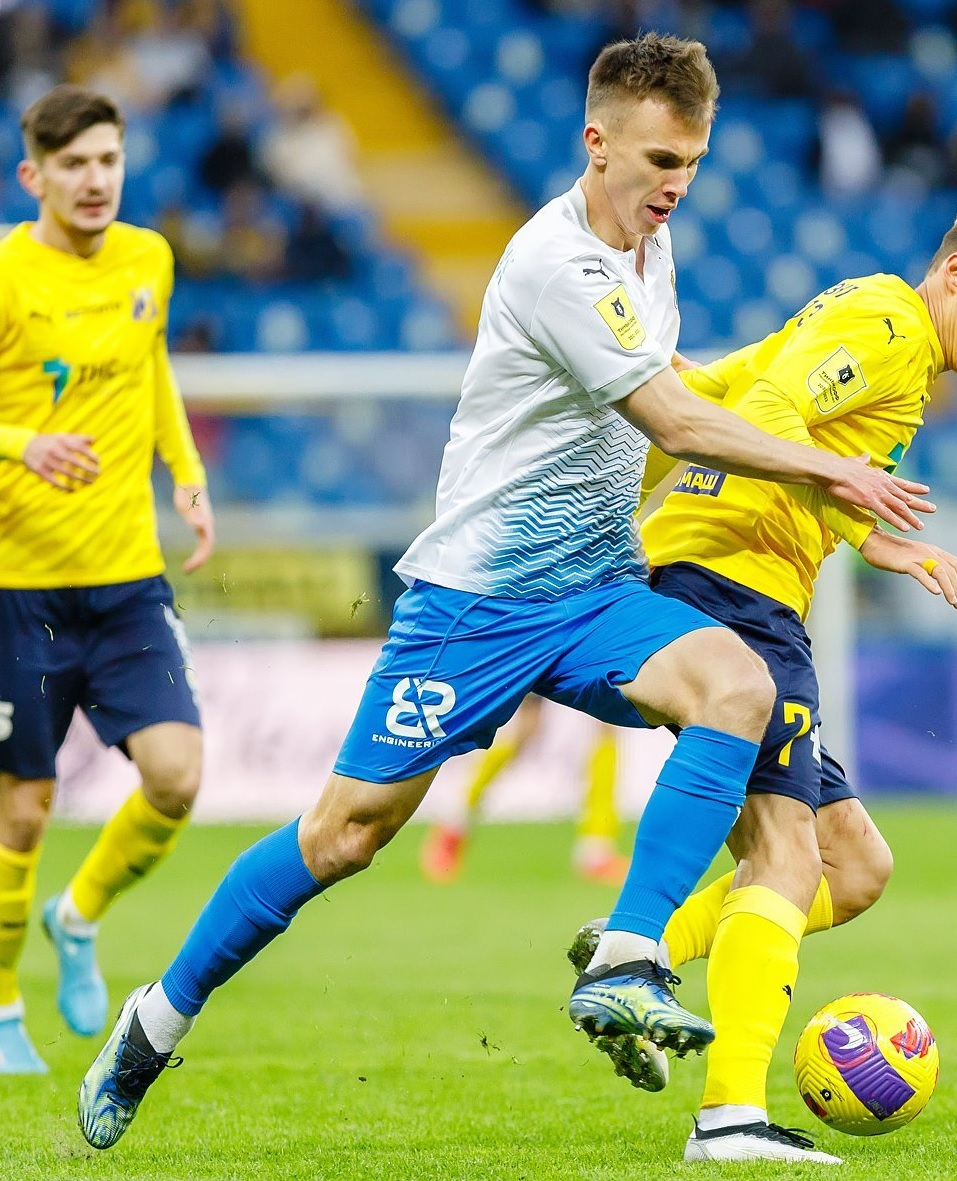
- Makarchuk with Sochi in 2022

Personal information
- Full name: Artyom Yevgenyevich Makarchuk
- Date of birth: 9 November 1995 (age 31)
- Place of birth: Svetly, Russia
- Height: 1.85 m (6 ft 1 in)
- Positions: Left-back; left midfielder

Team information
- Current team: Sochi
- Number: 17

Youth career
- 2001: Svetly Sport School
- Olympia Gvardeysk

Senior career*
| Years | Team | Apps | (Gls) |
| 2015–2017 | Baltika Kaliningrad | 32 | (3) |
| 2017–2018 | Luch-Energiya Vladivostok | 11 | (0) |
| 2018–2019 | Fakel Voronezh | 32 | (1) |
| 2019–2022 | Baltika Kaliningrad | 77 | (1) |
| 2022– | Sochi | 112 | (4) |

International career^{‡}
| 2022 | Russia | 3 | (0) |
- * Club domestic league appearances and goals as of 17 May 2026 ‡ National team caps and goals as of 12 September 2023

Artyom Yevgenyevich Makarchuk (Russian: Артём Евгеньевич Макарчук; born 9 November 1995) is a Russian football player who plays as a left-back or a left midfielder for PFC Sochi and the Russia national team.

== Club career ==
He made his professional debut in the Russian Football National League for FC Baltika Kaliningrad on 11 July 2015 in a game against FC Shinnik Yaroslavl.

On 8 February 2022, Makarchuk joined Russian Premier League club PFC Sochi. He made his RPL debut for Sochi on 7 March 2022 against FC Rostov.

== International career ==
Makarchuk was called up to the Russia national football team for the first time for a friendly against Kyrgyzstan in September 2022. He made his debut on 24 September 2022 in that game.

== Career statistics ==
=== Club ===
As of match played 17 May 2026

Appearances and goals by club, season and competition
| Club | Season | League | | | Cup | | Other | | Total | |
| Club | Season | Division | Apps | Goals | Apps | Goals | Apps | Goals | Apps | Goals |
|---|---|---|---|---|---|---|---|---|---|---|
| Baltika Kaliningrad | 2015–16 | Russian First League | 24 | 3 | 1 | 0 | 3 (Note: Appearances in FNL Cup) | 0 | 28 | 3 |
| Baltika Kaliningrad | 2016–17 | Russian First League | 8 | 0 | 1 | 0 | — | | 9 | 0 |
| Baltika Kaliningrad | Total | | 32 | 3 | 2 | 0 | 3 | 0 | 37 | 3 |
| Luch-Energia Vladivostok | 2017–18 | Russian First League | 11 | 0 | 1 | 0 | 2 | 0 | 14 | 0 |
| Fakel Voronezh | 2018–19 | Russian First League | 32 | 1 | 1 | 0 | 4 | 0 | 37 | 1 |
| Baltika Kaliningrad | 2019–20 | Russian First League | 23 | 0 | 2 | 0 | — | | 25 | 0 |
| Baltika Kaliningrad | 2020–21 | Russian First League | 30 | 0 | 0 | 0 | — | | 30 | 0 |
| Baltika Kaliningrad | 2021–22 | Russian First League | 24 | 1 | 1 | 0 | — | | 25 | 1 |
| Baltika Kaliningrad | Total | | 77 | 1 | 3 | 0 | — | | 80 | 1 |
| Sochi | 2021–22 | Russian Premier League | 10 | 2 | 0 | 0 | — | | 10 | 2 |
| Sochi | 2022–23 | Russian Premier League | 29 | 1 | 6 | 0 | — | | 35 | 1 |
| Sochi | 2023–24 | Russian Premier League | 28 | 0 | 2 | 0 | — | | 30 | 0 |
| Sochi | 2024–25 | Russian First League | 27 | 1 | 3 | 0 | 2 (Note: Appearances in promotion play-offs) | 0 | 32 | 1 |
| Sochi | 2025–26 | Russian Premier League | 18 | 0 | 3 | 0 | — | | 21 | 0 |
| Sochi | Total | | 112 | 4 | 14 | 0 | 2 | 0 | 128 | 4 |
| Career total | | | 264 | 9 | 21 | 0 | 11 | 0 | 296 | 9 |

=== International ===
As of match played 12 September 2023

Appearances and goals by national team and year
| National team | Year | Apps | Goals |
|---|---|---|---|
| Russia | 2022 | 3 | 0 |
| Total | | 3 | 0 |
