= Maksim Barsov =

Russian football forward

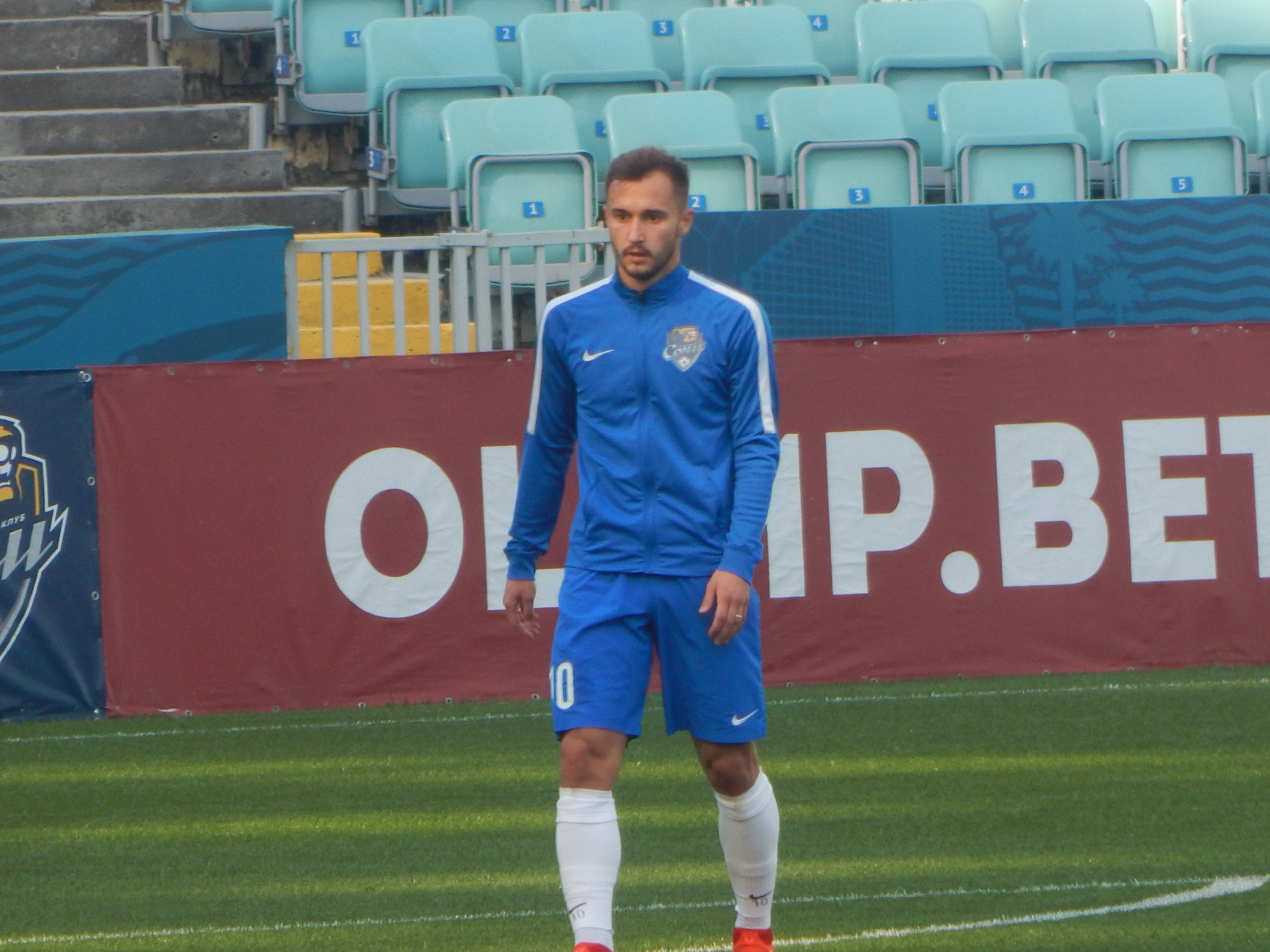

Personal information
- Full name: Maksim Borisovich Barsov
- Date of birth: 29 April 1993 (age 33)
- Place of birth: Tver, Russia
- Height: 1.77 m (5 ft 10 in)
- Position: Forward

Youth career
- –2012: FC Lokomotiv Moscow

Senior career*
Years	Team	Apps	(Gls)
2012–2013	FC Volga Ulyanovsk	18	(9)
2013	FC Kaluga	13	(2)
2014–2015	FC Gazovik Orenburg	13	(2)
2015–2016	FC KAMAZ Naberezhnye Chelny	31	(1)
2016–2017	FC Solyaris Moscow	23	(15)
2017–2018	FC Dynamo Saint Petersburg	36	(5)
2018–2022	PFC Sochi	46	(22)
2022	→ FC Baltika Kaliningrad (loan)	12	(3)
2022–2023	FC Neftekhimik Nizhnekamsk	22	(1)
2023	FC Spartak Kostroma	11	(0)

International career
2009	Russia U-17	6	(2)
- * Club domestic league appearances and goals

Maksim Borisovich Barsov (Russian: Максим Борисович Барсов; born 29 April 1993) is a Russian former football centre-forward.

== Club career ==
He made his debut in the Russian Second Division for FC Volga Ulyanovsk on 2 August 2012 in a game against FC Spartak Yoshkar-Ola.

He made his Russian Football National League debut for FC Gazovik Orenburg on 16 March 2014 in a game against FC Sibir Novosibirsk.

He made his Russian Premier League debut for PFC Sochi on 27 February 2021 in a game against FC Arsenal Tula. On 19 February 2022, Barsov was loaned to FC Baltika Kaliningrad until the end of the season. On 1 September 2022, Barsov was released by Sochi.

== Honours ==
- Russian Professional Football League Zone West top scorer: 2016–17.

== Career statistics ==
=== Club ===
As of 27 November 2022

Club	Season	League			Cup		Continental		Other		Total	
Club	Season	Division	Apps	Goals	Apps	Goals	Apps	Goals	Apps	Goals	Apps	Goals
Volga Ulyanovsk	2012–13	PFL	18	9	4	1	–		–		22	10
Kaluga	2013–14	PFL	13	2	–		–		–		13	2
Gazovik Orenburg	2013–14	FNL	8	1	–		–		–		8	1
Gazovik Orenburg	2014–15	FNL	5	1	1	0	–		3 (Note: Appearances in the FNL Cup)	0	9	1
Gazovik Orenburg	Total		13	2	1	0	0	0	3	0	17	2
KAMAZ	2015–16	FNL	31	1	1	0	–		–		32	1
Solyaris Moscow	2016–17	PFL	23	15	1	0	–		–		24	15
Dynamo Saint Petersburg	2017–18	FNL	36	5	3	1	–		–		39	6
Sochi	2018–19	FNL	32	19	1	0	–		–		33	19
Sochi	2019–20	RPL	0	0	0	0	–		–		0	0
Sochi	2020–21	RPL	4	1	1	0	–		–		5	1
Sochi	2021–22	RPL	10	2	0	0	4 (Note: Appearances in the UEFA Europa Conference League)	1	–		14	3
Sochi	2022–23	RPL	0	0	1	0	–		–		1	0
Sochi	Total		46	22	3	0	4	1	0	0	53	23
Baltika Kaliningrad (loan)	2021–22	First League	12	3	2	0	–		–		14	3
Neftekhimik Nizhnekamsk	2022–23	First League	12	0	2	1	–		–		14	1
Career total			204	59	17	3	4	1	3	0	228	63
