= Viktor Morozov (footballer) =

Russian football player

Personal information
- Full name: Viktor Yevgenyevich Morozov
- Date of birth: 8 October 2001 (age 25)
- Place of birth: Trollhättan, Sweden
- Height: 1.95 m (6 ft 5 in)
- Position: Forward

Team information
- Current team: FC Chayka Peschanokopskoye
- Number: 91

Youth career
- –2016: FK Tønsberg
- 2017–2019: Akademiya Futbola Krasnodar Krai
- 2020: PFC Sochi

Senior career*
Years	Team	Apps	(Gls)
2019–2020	FC Kuban-Holding Pavlovskaya (amateur)		
2020–2021	PFC Sochi	0	(0)
2020	→ FC Olimp-Dolgoprudny (loan)	0	(0)
2021–	FC Chayka Peschanokopskoye	11	(0)
- * Club domestic league appearances and goals as of 5 June 2022

Viktor Yevgenyevich Morozov (Russian: Виктор Евгеньевич Морозов; born 8 October 2001) is a Russian football player who plays for FC Chayka Peschanokopskoye. He also holds Swedish citizenship as he was born there.

== Club career ==
He made his debut in the Russian Football National League for FC Chayka Peschanokopskoye on 27 February 2021 in a game against FC Shinnik Yaroslavl.
