= Kirill Zaika =

Russian footballer (born 1992)

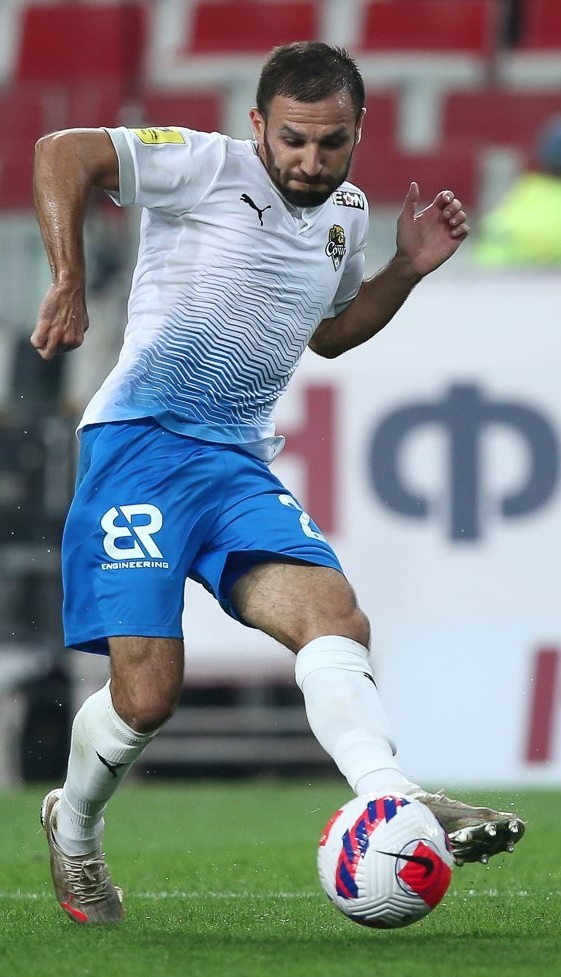
- Zaika with PFC Sochi in 2021

Personal information
- Full name: Kirill Anatolyevich Zaika
- Date of birth: 7 October 1992 (age 34)
- Place of birth: Uspenskoye, Krasnodar Krai, Russia
- Height: 1.68 m (5 ft 6 in)
- Position: Wide midfielder

Team information
- Current team: PFC Sochi
- Number: 27

Youth career
- –2009: DYuSSh Vyselki

Senior career*
Years	Team	Apps	(Gls)
2010–2011	FC Rostov	0	(0)
2010–2011	→ FC Taganrog (loan)	15	(4)
2012–2015	FC Taganrog	97	(4)
2015–2018	FC Khimki	92	(3)
2018–	PFC Sochi	176	(6)
- * Club domestic league appearances and goals as of 17 May 2026

Kirill Anatolyevich Zaika (Russian: Кирилл Анатольевич Заика; born 7 October 1992) is a Russian professional football player who plays as wide midfielder (on left or right) for PFC Sochi. He also played as left-back and right-back.

== Club career ==
He made his Russian Football National League debut for FC Khimki on 11 July 2016 in a game against FC Tosno. He made his Russian Premier League debut for PFC Sochi on 1 March 2020 in a game against FC Arsenal Tula, as a starter.

== International career ==
Zaika was called up to the Russia national football team for the first time for a training camp in March 2022, at the time of Russia's suspension from international football.

== Personal life ==
His wife Anna Cholovyaga is a former player for the Russia women's national football team.

== Career statistics ==
As of match played 17 May 2026

Club	Season	League			Cup		Continental		Other		Total	
Club	Season	Division	Apps	Goals	Apps	Goals	Apps	Goals	Apps	Goals	Apps	Goals
Taganrog	2010	Russian Second League	15	4	—		—		—		15	4
Taganrog	2011–12	Russian Second League	33	1	0	0	—		—		33	1
Taganrog	2012–13	Russian Second League	25	0	3	0	—		—		28	0
Taganrog	2013–14	Russian Second League	9	0	0	0	—		—		9	0
Taganrog	2014–15	Russian Second League	30	3	2	0	—		—		32	3
Taganrog	Total		112	8	5	0	0	0	0	0	117	8
Khimki	2015–16	Russian Second League	27	1	6	0	—		—		33	1
Khimki	2016–17	Russian First League	33	2	2	0	—		—		35	2
Khimki	2017–18	Russian First League	32	0	1	0	—		—		33	0
Khimki	Total		92	3	9	0	0	0	0	0	101	3
Sochi	2018–19	Russian First League	16	0	1	0	—		—		17	0
Sochi	2019–20	Russian Premier League	10	1	0	0	—		—		10	1
Sochi	2020–21	Russian Premier League	23	1	3	0	—		—		26	1
Sochi	2021–22	Russian Premier League	28	1	0	0	4 (Note: Appearances in UEFA Europa Conference League)	0	—		32	1
Sochi	2022–23	Russian Premier League	15	2	2	0	—		—		17	2
Sochi	2023–24	Russian Premier League	27	0	6	1	—		—		33	1
Sochi	2024–25	Russian First League	31	0	0	0	—		2 (Note: Appearances in promotion play-offs)	1	33	1
Sochi	2025–26	Russian Premier League	26	1	5	0	—		—		31	1
Sochi	Total		176	6	17	1	4	0	2	1	199	8
Career total			380	17	31	1	4	0	2	1	417	19
