= Sergey Terekhov =

Russian footballer

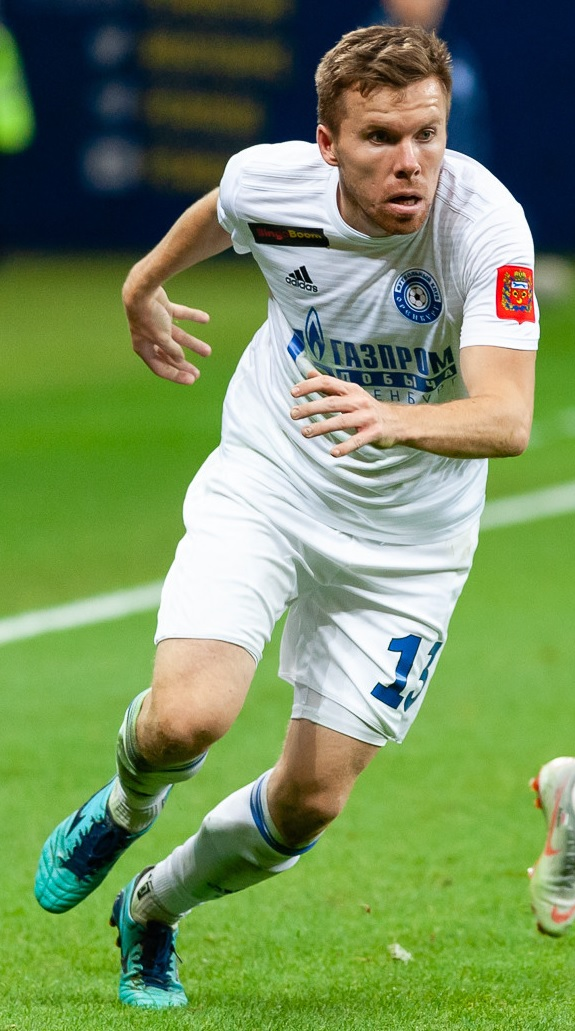
- Terekhov with FC Orenburg in 2018

Personal information
- Full name: Sergey Yuryevich Terekhov
- Date of birth: 27 June 1990 (age 36)
- Place of birth: Bryansk, Russian SFSR, Soviet Union
- Height: 1.79 m (5 ft 10 in)
- Position: Centre-back

Team information
- Current team: Dynamo Bryansk
- Number: 32

Youth career
- Partizan Bryansk

Senior career*
Years	Team	Apps	(Gls)
2008	Dynamo Bryansk	30	(0)
2009–2012	Dynamo Moscow	3	(0)
2010	→ Khimki (loan)	11	(0)
2011	→ Baltika Kaliningrad (loan)	12	(0)
2013–2016	Volgar Astrakhan	107	(10)
2016–2017	Dynamo Moscow	37	(1)
2018–2021	Orenburg	69	(7)
2020–2021	→ Sochi (loan)	27	(3)
2021–2023	Sochi	52	(2)
2023–2025	Khimki	35	(1)
2025	Sochi	8	(0)
2026	Kuban Krasnodar	9	(0)
2026–	Dynamo Bryansk	12	(0)

International career^{‡}
2010	Russia U-20	2	(0)
2010	Russia U-21	2	(0)
2021–	Russia	2	(0)
- * Club domestic league appearances and goals as of 15 November 2026 ‡ National team caps and goals as of 11 November 2021

Sergey Yuryevich Terekhov (Russian: Сергей Юрьевич Терехов; born 27 June 1990) is a Russian footballer who plays as a centre-back for Dynamo Bryansk. He played most of his career as a left-back or left midfielder.

== Club career ==
Terekhov made his professional debut in the Russian First Division in 2008 for Dynamo Bryansk. He made his Russian Premier League debut on 17 October 2009 for Dynamo Moscow against Tom Tomsk.

On 6 August 2020, Terekhov joined Sochi on loan for the 2020–21 season. On 31 May 2021, Orenburg confirmed that Sochi purchased his rights on a permanent basis.

On 16 January 2025, Terekhov left Khimki.

== International career ==
Terekhov was called up to the Russia national football team for the first time for World Cup qualifiers against Croatia, Cyprus and Malta in September 2021. He made his debut on 8 October 2021 against Slovakia.

== Career statistics ==
As of match played 31 May 2025

Appearances and goals by club, season and competition
Club	Season	League			Cup		Europe		Other		Total	
Club	Season	Division	Apps	Goals	Apps	Goals	Apps	Goals	Apps	Goals	Apps	Goals
Dynamo Bryansk	2008	Russian First League	30	0	1	0	—		—		31	0
Dynamo Moscow	2009	Russian Premier League	3	0	0	0	0	0	—		3	0
Khimki (loan)	2010	Russian First League	11	0	0	0	—		—		11	0
Baltika Kaliningrad (loan)	2011–12	Russian First League	12	0	1	0	—		—		13	0
Volgar Astrakhan	2012–13	Russian First League	12	0	0	0	—		—		12	0
Volgar Astrakhan	2013–14	Russian First League	32	4	0	0	—		—		32	4
Volgar Astrakhan	2014–15	Russian First League	32	2	1	0	—		4 (Note: Appearances in FNL Cup)	0	37	2
Volgar Astrakhan	2015–16	Russian First League	31	4	0	0	—		6 (Note: Two appearances in promotion play-offs, four appearances in FNL Cup)	0	37	4
Volgar Astrakhan	Total		107	10	1	0	0	0	10	0	118	10
Dynamo Moscow	2016–17	Russian First League	24	1	2	0	—		—		26	1
Dynamo Moscow	2017–18	Russian Premier League	13	0	0	0	—		—		13	0
Dynamo Moscow	Total		37	1	2	0	0	0	0	0	39	1
Orenburg	2017–18	Russian First League	13	4	—		—		—		13	4
Orenburg	2018–19	Russian Premier League	28	3	3	0	—		—		31	3
Orenburg	2019–20	Russian Premier League	27	0	2	0	—		—		29	0
Orenburg	2020–21	Russian First League	1	0	—		—		—		1	0
Orenburg	Total		69	7	5	0	0	0	0	0	74	7
Sochi (loan)	2020–21	Russian Premier League	27	3	4	0	—		—		31	3
Sochi	2021–22	Russian Premier League	25	2	1	0	4 (Note: Appearances in UEFA Conference League)	2	—		30	4
Sochi	2022–23	Russian Premier League	27	0	4	0	—		—		31	0
Sochi	Total		52	2	5	0	4	2	0	0	61	4
Khimki	2023–24	Russian First League	27	1	4	0	—		—		31	1
Khimki	2024–25	Russian Premier League	8	0	5	0	—		—		13	0
Khimki	Total		35	1	9	0	—		—		44	1
Sochi	2024–25	Russian First League	8	0	0	0	–		2 (Note: Appearances in promotion play-offs)	0	10	0
Career total			391	24	28	0	4	2	12	0	435	26
