= Mount Fisht =

Mountain in Adyega and Krasnodar Krai, Russia

Fisht
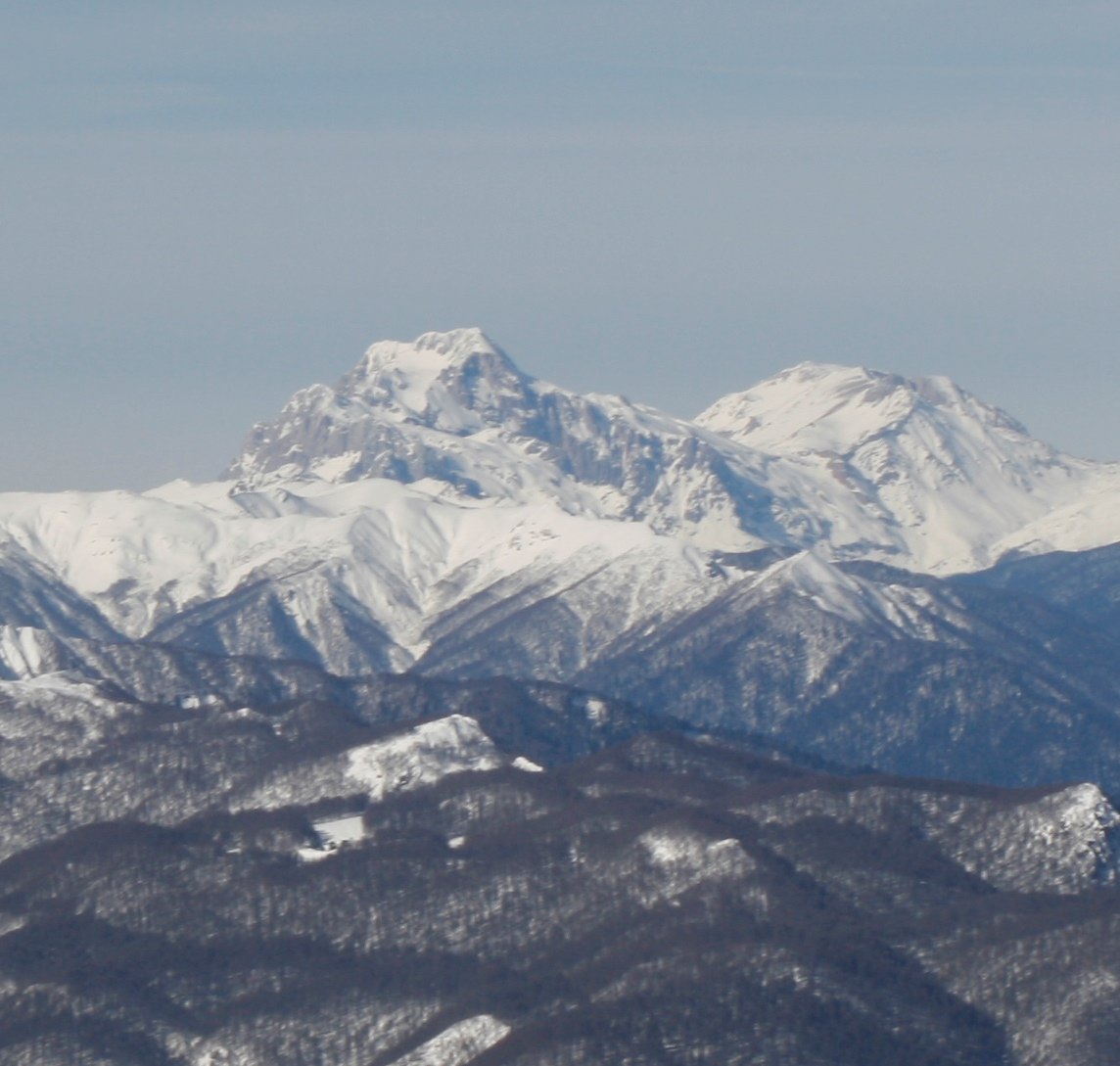
- View on Fisht (left) from Mt. Achishkho, Krasnaya Polyana

Highest point
- Elevation: 2,850 m (9,350 ft)
- Prominence: 1,374 m (4,508 ft)
- Isolation: 25.6 km (15.9 mi)
- Listing: Ribu
- Coordinates: 43°56′28″N 39°54′07″E

Geography
- Location within Caucasus Mountains
- Location: Adygea, Russia
- Country: Adygea
- Parent range: Caucasus

Mount Fisht (Russian: Фишт, IPA: [ˈfʲiʂt]; Adyghe: Фыщт [fəɕt]) is a peak located in the western Caucasus Mountains, in the Republic of Adygea, southwestern Russia.

== Description ==
Fisht forms together with the peaks of Oshten and Pshekhu-Su the so-called Fisht-Oshten massif. The tops of the massif represent the first (advancing from west to east) in the Caucasus alpine-type peaks, that is, rising much higher than the upper boundary of the forest, having a wide belt of subalpine and alpine mountain meadows. In addition, Fisht is the westernmost peak of the Caucasus, which has glaciers on its slopes (Big and Small Fishtinsky glaciers) and considerable rock faults.

Structurally, Fisht is a blocky uplift composed of layers of reef-limestone. Powerful limestone strata contribute to the development of numerous and diverse karst forms (funnels, caves). Of the famous, on the slope of the mountain is a cave "Floating Bird". Since 1994, the cave system "White Star" is being researched in Fisht, which is one of the deepest in Russia.

On the Great Fishtinsky Glacier is the classic climbing route of the category of complexity 1B. There are also climbing routes with a complexity of up to 6 A.

It is believed that the mountain was once an island in the ancient Tethys Ocean, which explains its coral structure.

From the slopes of Fisht, the river Pshekh begins, at the tops of Fish and Oshtan there is the source of the Belaya River, downstream of the receiving water of the Pshekhi River, and flowing into the Kuban. Shah also originates in Fisht, but flows into the Black Sea. From the western wall of the mountain flows the Fisht Falls, about 200 m high.

The mountain is mentioned in the video "Russian alphabet", shown during the opening of the 2014 Winter Olympics in Sochi.

In honor of the mountain was named the stadium in the city of Sochi. The Fisht Olympic Stadium is named after this mountain.
