= Vanja Drkušić =

Slovenian footballer (born 1999)

- Drkušić with Zenit Saint Petersburg in 2025

Personal information
- Date of birth: 30 October 1999 (age 27)
- Place of birth: Novo Mesto, Slovenia
- Height: 1.88 m (6 ft 2 in)
- Position: Centre-back

Team information
- Current team: Espanyol (on loan from Zenit Saint Petersburg)
- Number: 16

Youth career
- –2013: Krka
- 2014–2015: Krško
- 2016–2018: Heerenveen

Senior career*
| Years | Team | Apps | (Gls) |
| 2018–2019 | Heerenveen | 0 | (0) |
| 2019–2020 | Rende | 0 | (0) |
| 2020–2022 | Bravo | 69 | (4) |
| 2022–2024 | Sochi | 60 | (3) |
| 2024– | Zenit Saint Petersburg | 36 | (0) |
| 2024–2025 | → Red Star Belgrade (loan) | 9 | (1) |
| 2026– | → Espanyol (loan) | 7 | (0) |

International career^{‡}
| 2015–2016 | Slovenia U17 | 17 | (0) |
| 2017 | Slovenia U18 | 3 | (0) |
| 2017 | Slovenia U19 | 5 | (1) |
| 2019 | Slovenia U21 | 1 | (0) |
| 2023– | Slovenia | 35 | (1) |
- * Club domestic league appearances and goals as of 7 November 2026 ‡ National team caps and goals as of 16 November 2026

Vanja Drkušić (born 30 October 1999) is a Slovenian professional footballer who plays as a centre-back for La Liga club Espanyol, on loan from Russian Premier League club Zenit Saint Petersburg, and for the Slovenia national team.

== Club career ==
In December 2015, Drkušić joined Dutch top-flight side Heerenveen, after receiving interest from Maribor, Dinamo Zagreb and Atalanta. In August 2019, he signed for Rende in the Italian third division. Before the second half of the 2019–20 season, Drkušić signed for Slovenian team Bravo. He made his debut for the team on 23 February 2020 in a 2–1 win against Tabor Sežana. On 11 July 2020, Drkušić scored his first goal for Bravo in a 1–1 draw with Domžale.

On 24 January 2022, Drkušić signed for Russian Premier League side Sochi for an alleged fee of €100,000. On 27 August 2022, he extended his contract with Sochi until 2025.

On 13 August 2024, Drkušić moved to fellow top-tier side Zenit Saint Petersburg, signing a five-year deal with the six-time defending Russian champions. Three days later, Zenit loaned him to Red Star Belgrade for the first part of the 2024–25 season.

After winning the 2025–26 Russian Premier League title with Zenit, Drkušić went on another season-long loan in August 2026, this time to La Liga side Espanyol.

== International career ==
Drkušić represented Slovenia at youth international levels from under-17 to under-21. He made his debut for the senior team on 26 March 2023 in a European Championship qualifier against San Marino.

== Career statistics ==
=== Club ===
As of match played 5 August 2026

Appearances and goals by club, season and competition
| Club | Season | League | | | National cup (Note: Includes Slovenian Cup, Russian Cup, Serbian Cup) | | Continental | | Other | | Total | |
| Club | Season | Division | Apps | Goals | Apps | Goals | Apps | Goals | Apps | Goals | Apps | Goals |
|---|---|---|---|---|---|---|---|---|---|---|---|---|
| Heerenveen | 2018–19 | Eredivisie | 0 | 0 | 0 | 0 | — | | — | | 0 | 0 |
| Rende | 2019–20 | Serie C | 0 | 0 | — | | — | | 1 (Note: Appearance in Coppa Italia Serie C) | 0 | 1 | 0 |
| Bravo | 2019–20 | Slovenian PrvaLiga | 15 | 1 | — | | — | | — | | 15 | 1 |
| Bravo | 2020–21 | Slovenian PrvaLiga | 35 | 1 | 1 | 0 | — | | — | | 36 | 1 |
| Bravo | 2021–22 | Slovenian PrvaLiga | 19 | 2 | 2 | 0 | — | | — | | 21 | 2 |
| Bravo | Total | | 69 | 4 | 3 | 0 | 0 | 0 | 0 | 0 | 72 | 4 |
| Sochi | 2021–22 | Russian Premier League | 11 | 0 | 0 | 0 | — | | — | | 11 | 0 |
| Sochi | 2022–23 | Russian Premier League | 26 | 1 | 5 | 1 | — | | — | | 31 | 2 |
| Sochi | 2023–24 | Russian Premier League | 23 | 2 | 1 | 0 | — | | — | | 24 | 2 |
| Sochi | Total | | 60 | 3 | 6 | 1 | 0 | 0 | 0 | 0 | 66 | 4 |
| Zenit Saint Petersburg | 2024–25 | Russian Premier League | 7 | 0 | 3 | 0 | — | | — | | 10 | 0 |
| Zenit Saint Petersburg | 2025–26 | Russian Premier League | 28 | 0 | 5 | 0 | — | | — | | 33 | 0 |
| Zenit Saint Petersburg | 2026–27 | Russian Premier League | 1 | 0 | 1 | 0 | — | | 1 (Note: Appearance in Russian Super Cup) | 0 | 3 | 0 |
| Zenit Saint Petersburg | Total | | 36 | 0 | 9 | 0 | 0 | 0 | 1 | 0 | 46 | 0 |
| Red Star Belgrade (loan) | 2024–25 | Serbian SuperLiga | 9 | 1 | 1 | 0 | 2 (Note: Appearances in UEFA Champions League) | 0 | — | | 12 | 1 |
| Career total | | | 174 | 8 | 19 | 1 | 2 | 0 | 2 | 0 | 197 | 9 |

=== International ===
As of match played 16 November 2026

Appearances and goals by national team and year
| National team | Year | Apps | Goals |
|---|---|---|---|
| Slovenia | 2023 | 4 | 0 |
| Slovenia | 2024 | 13 | 0 |
| Slovenia | 2025 | 9 | 0 |
| Slovenia | 2026 | 9 | 1 |
| Total | | 35 | 1 |

== Honours ==
Zenit Saint Petersburg

- Russian Premier League: 2025–26
- Russian Super Cup: 2026
