= Andrei Bokovoy =

Russian footballer

Personal information
- Full name: Andrei Dmitriyevich Bokovoy
- Date of birth: 4 March 2000 (age 26)
- Place of birth: Saint Petersburg, Russia
- Height: 1.75 m (5 ft 9 in)
- Position: Midfielder

Youth career
- –2019: SShOR Zenit St. Petersburg
- 2019: Almaz-Antey St. Petersburg

Senior career*
| Years | Team | Apps | (Gls) |
| 2019–2021 | Sochi | 4 | (0) |
| 2021 | Veles Moscow | 9 | (1) |
| 2021–2022 | Zvezda Perm | 18 | (0) |
| 2022–2023 | Tver | 22 | (6) |
| 2023–2024 | Dynamo St. Petersburg | 7 | (0) |
| 2024–2025 | Kristall St. Petersburg | | |
| 2025–2026 | Spartak Tambov | 21 | (1) |
- * Club domestic league appearances and goals as of 15 August 2026

Andrei Dmitriyevich Bokovoy (Russian: Андрей Дмитриевич Боковой; born 4 March 2000) is a Russian football player.

== Club career ==
He made his debut in the Russian Premier League for Sochi on 19 June 2020 in a game against Rostov, replacing Aleksandr Kokorin in the 69th minute. Rostov was forced to field their Under-18 squad in that game as their main squad was quarantined after 6 players tested positive for COVID-19.

On 25 February 2021, he moved to Russian First League side Veles Moscow.
