= Fisht Olympic Stadium =

Sports venue in Sochi, Russia

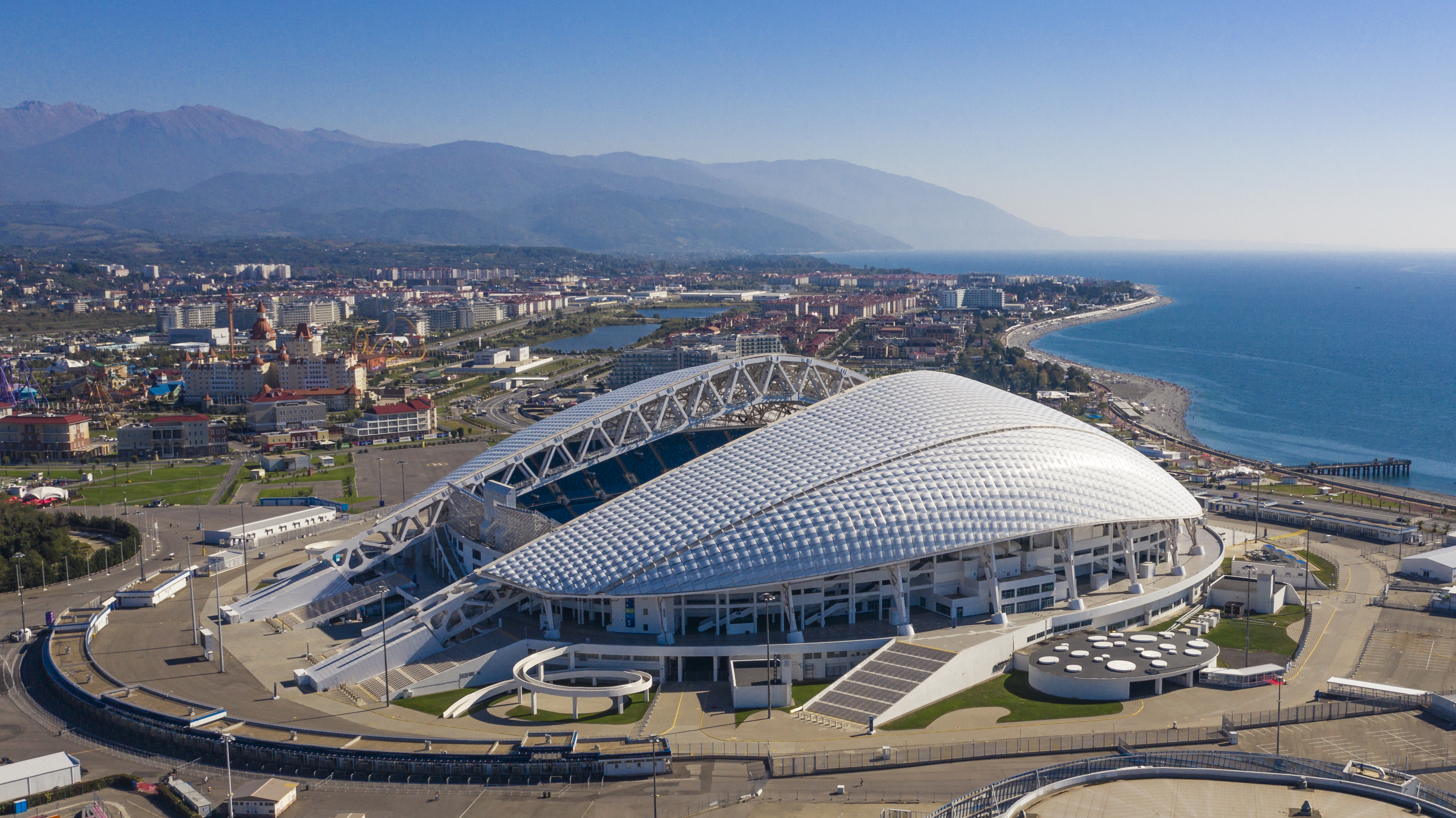
- Fisht Olympic Stadium in January 2018.
- Interactive map of Fisht Olympic Stadium
- Full name: Fisht Olympic Stadium
- Location: Sochi, Krasnodar Krai, Russia
- Coordinates: 43°24′08″N 39°57′22″E
- Owner: Government of Russia (Olympstroy)
- Capacity: 45,994 (RPL); 44,287 (2018 FIFA World Cup)
- Surface: Grass
- Field size: 105 x 68 m

Construction
- Groundbreaking: 2010
- Built: 2011–2013
- Opened: 2013
- Cost: US $779 million
- Architects: Populous, Buro Happold

Tenants
- PFC Sochi (2018–present); Russia national football team (selected matches); Russia national rugby union team (selected matches)

Fisht Olympic Stadium (Russian: Олимпийский стадион «Фишт», romanized: Olimpiyskiy stadion "Fisht", IPA: [ɐlʲɪmˈpʲijskʲɪj stədʲɪˈon ˈfʲiʂt]) is an outdoor stadium in Sochi, Russia. Located in Sochi Olympic Park and named after Mount Fisht, the 45,994-capacity stadium was constructed for the 2014 Winter Olympics and Paralympics, where it served as the venue for their opening and closing ceremonies.

The stadium was originally built as an enclosed facility; it was re-opened in 2016 as an open-air football stadium, initially hosting matches during the 2017 FIFA Confederations Cup and 2018 FIFA World Cup, and currently serving as the home pitch for PFC Sochi of the Russian Premier League.

The current manager of the stadium is (as of 03.04.2026) Veniamin Vasilyevich Bogomolov.

== History ==
The stadium was originally unveiled in 2009 as the ceremonies venue for the 2014 Winter Olympics and Paralympics in Sochi; it was designed by Populous and British design consultancy BuroHappold Engineering. Construction began in 2010, and was completed in 2013 at a cost US$779 million.

The stadium underwent a 3 billion ruble (US$46 million) renovation in preparation for post-Olympics use, including the 2017 FIFA Confederations Cup and 2018 FIFA World Cup hosted by Russia, and for use facility for the Russian national football team; among other changes, the closed roof was removed in order to make the stadium compliant with FIFA regulations, and the stadium underwent a temporary expansion in capacity. The work was expected to be completed by June 2016, but construction delays pushed its completion back to November 2016.

== Design ==
The stadium's roof was built from approximately 36,500 square metres (393,000 sq ft) of ethylene tetrafluoroethylene (ETFE) and was designed to give the roof the appearance of snowy peaks. The bowl opens to the north, allowing a direct view of the Krasnaya Polyana Mountains, and the upper deck is open to the south, allowing a view of the Black Sea.

== Post-Olympics usage ==
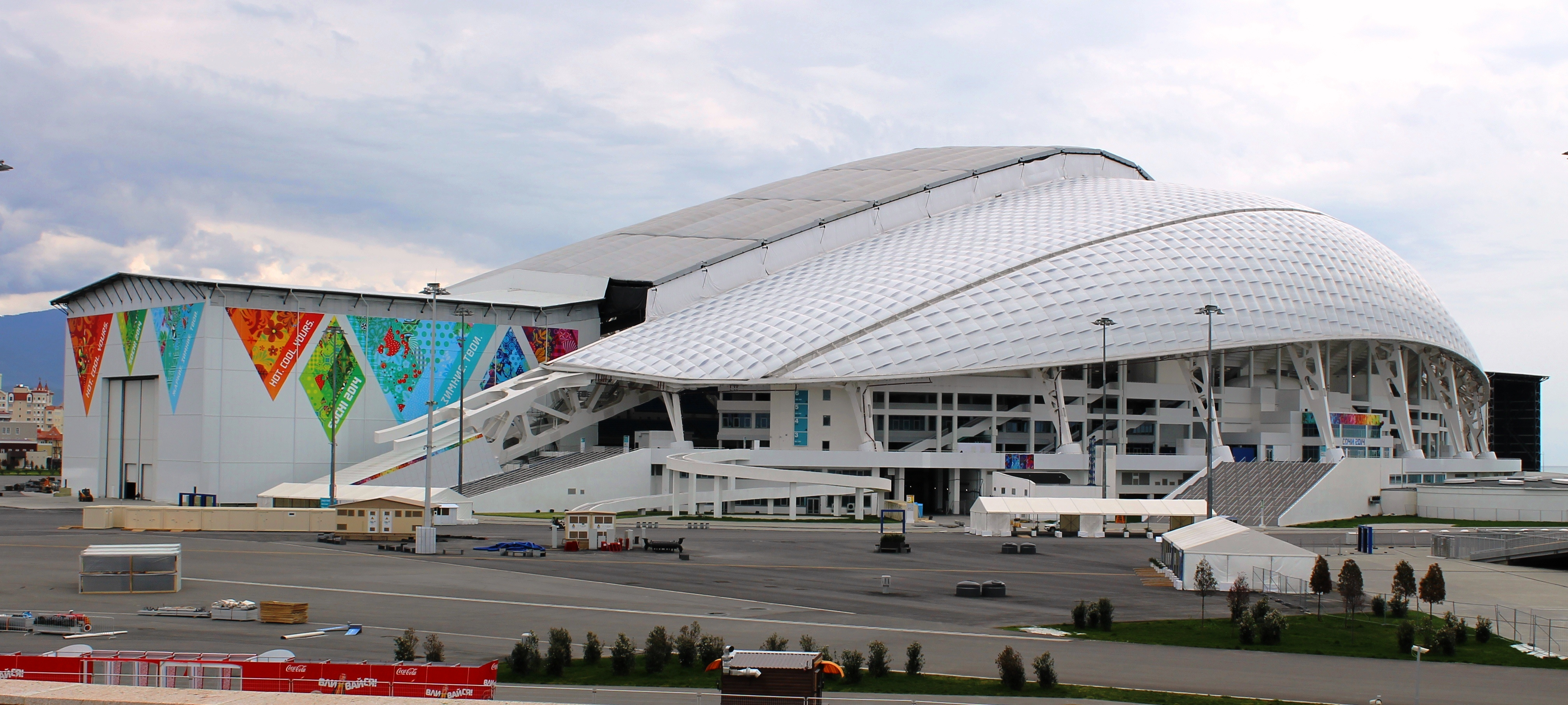
Fisht Olympic Stadium shortly after the 2014 Winter Olympics.

After the 2018 FIFA World Cup, FC Dynamo Saint Petersburg of the second division moved from St. Petersburg to Sochi to play in the Fisht Stadium. The team became PFC Sochi, the first professional club in the city since the disbanding of FC Zhemchuzhina-Sochi in 2013 and the first at a professional level since FC Sochi 2013's 2017 disbanding.

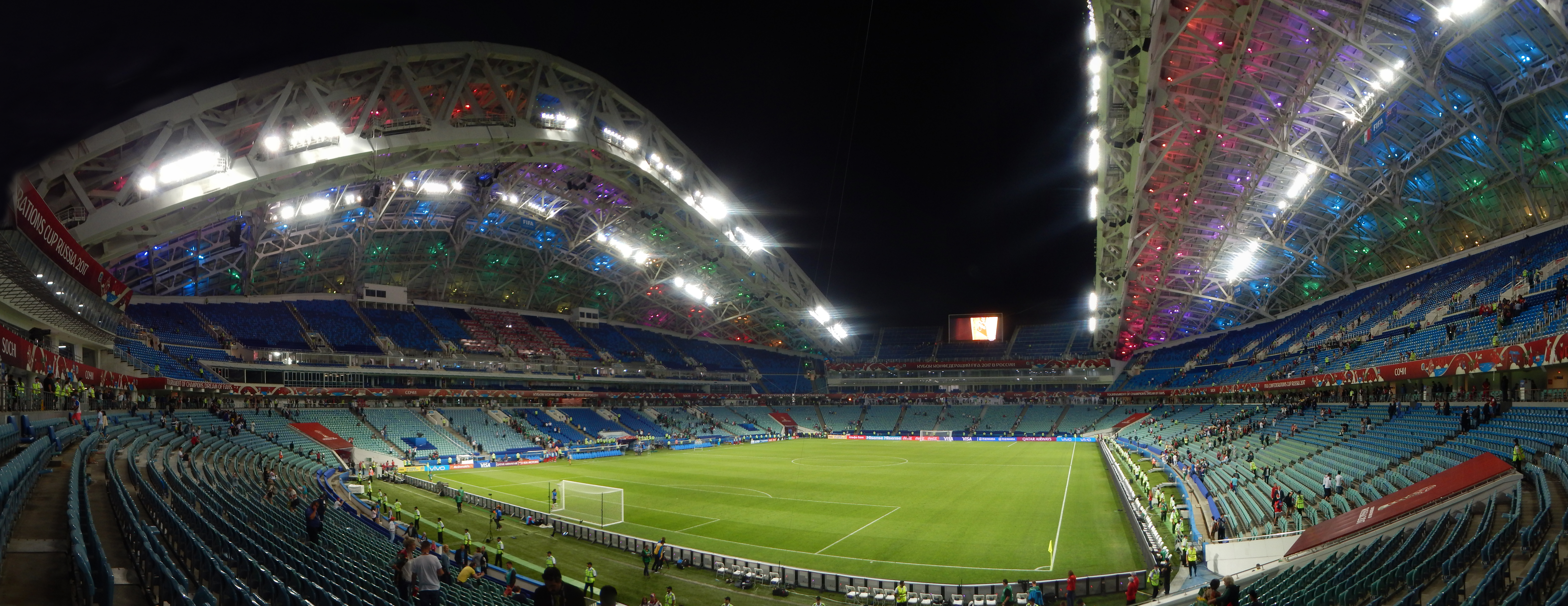
Panoramic view of the interior of the stadium .

== Commemoration ==
In October 2013, the Central Bank of Russia issued a commemorative 100-ruble note to mark 100 days before the opening ceremonies of the 2014 Winter Olympics. The blue-tinted banknote depicts a flying snowboarder on one side, and on the other the Fisht Olympic Stadium and a firebird.

== Tournament results ==
=== 2017 FIFA Confederations Cup ===
Date	Time	Team #1	Result	Team #2	Round	Attendance
19 June 2017	18:00	Australia	2–3	Germany	Group B	28,605
21 June 2017	21:00	Mexico	2–1	New Zealand	Group A	25,133
25 June 2017	18:00	Germany	3–1	Cameroon	Group B	30,230
29 June 2017	21:00	Germany	4–1	Mexico	Semi-final	37,923

=== 2018 FIFA World Cup ===
Date	Time	Team #1	Result	Team #2	Round	Attendance
15 June 2018	21:00	Portugal	3–3	Spain	Group B	43,866
18 June 2018	18:00	Belgium	3–0	Panama	Group G	43,257
23 June 2018	21:00	Germany	2–1	Sweden	Group F	44,287
26 June 2018	17:00	Australia	0–2	Peru	Group C	44,073
30 June 2018	21:00	Uruguay	2–1	Portugal	Round of 16	44,287
7 July 2018	21:00	Russia	2–2 (a.e.t.) (3–4 pen.)	Croatia	Quarter-finals	44,287

== Location and access ==
Fisht Stadium is located in Sochi, in the Sochi Olympic Park in Adler, south of the Sochi Airport, at 15 Olympic Avenue. The Fisht Stadium can be reached by buses 57, 117, 125, 134, 173. A suburban electric train Sochi–Adler–Olympic Park also provides access to the stadium.
