= PFC Sochi =

Russian football club

Sochi
- Full name: Футбольный клуб Сочи (Football Club Sochi)
- Nicknames: Belo-sinie (The White-Blues); Leopardy (The Leopards)
- Founded: 6 June 2018; 8 years ago
- Ground: Fisht Olympic Stadium
- Capacity: 47,659
- Owner: Boris Rotenberg
- Chairman: Dmitry Rubashko (Director General)
- Manager: Igor Osinkin
- League: Russian First League
- 2025–26: Russian Premier League, 16th of 16 (relegated)
- Website: pfcsochi.ru

Football Club Sochi (Russian: Футбольный клуб Сочи, romanized: Futbolny Klub Sochi), is a Russian professional football club based in Sochi. The club is playing its home matches at the 47,000-capacity Fisht Stadium.

== History ==
FC Sochi was founded on 4 July 2018 after the relocation of FC Dynamo Saint Petersburg to Sochi, thus becoming the only professional football club in the city.

On 11 May 2019, the club secured a top-two finish in the 2018–19 Russian National Football League and subsequently promotion to the Russian Premier League for the 2019–20 season for the first time in the club's history.

On 20 November 2019, Sochi announced that Aleksandr Tochilin had resigned as manager, with Roman Berezovsky being placed in temporary charge. On 8 December 2019, Sochi announced Vladimir Fedotov as their new permanent manager on a 2 1/2-year contract.

On 19 June 2020, Sochi beat FC Rostov 10–1, making it their biggest Premier League win in their history. Rostov missed their full first and second squad (42 players) due to positive COVID-19 tests in both squads.

Sochi managed to finish in twelfth place in their debut season in the top tier, avoiding relegation.

Sochi finished the 2020–21 Russian Premier League season in 5th place and qualified for European competition (UEFA Europa Conference League) for the first time in their history.

In the 2021–22 Russian Premier League, Sochi finished in 2nd place after beating FC Dynamo Moscow away 5–1 on the last matchday of the season and overtaking Dynamo in the standings.

On 18 May 2024, Sochi lost 2–3 to Krasnodar, sealing their relegation to the Russian First League after five seasons in the top tier.

In the 2024–25 season, Sochi finished 5th in the First League. However, because 3rd-placed Chernomorets Novorossiysk was not granted the Premier League license, Sochi took their place in the promotion play-offs. Sochi won the play-offs 4–3 on aggregate against Pari Nizhny Novgorod and was promoted back to the Russian Premier League.

On 10 May 2026, Sochi were relegated back to Russian First League after one season in the top tier.

=== League position ===
Season	League										Russian Cup	Top goalscorer		Manager
Season	Div.	Pos.	Pl.	W	D	L	GF	GA	GD	P	Russian Cup	Name	Goals	Manager
2018–19	2nd	2nd	38	19	12	7	63	34	+29	69	Third Round	(Russia) Maksim Barsov	19	(Russia) Aleksandr Tochilin
2019–20	1st	12th	30	8	9	13	40	39	+1	33	Round of 32	(Russia) Aleksandr Kokorin	7	(Russia) Aleksandr Tochilin (Armenia) Roman Berezovsky (Caretaker) (Russia) Vladimir Fedotov
2020–21	1st	5th	30	15	8	7	49	33	+16	53	Quarterfinal	(Ecuador) Christian Noboa	12	(Russia) Vladimir Fedotov
2021–22	1st	2nd	30	17	5	8	54	30	+24	56	Round of 16	(Colombia) Mateo Cassierra	14	(Russia) Vladimir Fedotov
2022–23	1st	10th	30	11	5	14	37	54	-17	38	Group stage	(Ecuador) Christian Noboa	11	(Russia) Vadim Garanin (Turkmenistan) Kurban Berdyev (Russia) Dmitri Khokhlov (Caretaker)
2023–24	1st	16th	30	5	9	16	37	48	-11	24	Regions path QF Stage 1	(Venezuela) Saúl Guarirapa	8	(Russia) Dmitri Khokhlov (Russia) Aleksandr Tochilin (Russia) Denis Klyuyev (Caretaker) (Spain) Robert Moreno

=== European history ===
For their inaugural European campaign, Sochi where drawn against Azerbaijan Cup champions, Keşla, in the UEFA Europa Conference League on 16 June 2021.

As of match played 12 August 2021

Competition	Pld	W	D	L	GF	GA
UEFA Europa Conference League	4	2	2	0	10	5
Total	4	2	2	0	10	5

Season	Competition	Round	Opponent	Home	Away	Aggregate
2021–22	UEFA Europa Conference League	2QR	(Azerbaijan) Keşla	3–0	4–2	7–2
2021–22	UEFA Europa Conference League	3QR	(Serbia) Partizan	1–1	2–2 (a.e.t.)	3–3 (2–4 p)

== Stadiums ==
Since its creation, PFC Sochi plays at Fisht Olympic Stadium in Sochi. The stadium provides 40,000 seats to its spectators.

The Federal Sport base "Yug Sport" was the training center in the beginning of the 2018–19 season.

== Current squad ==
As of 11 September 2026

Note: Flags indicate national team as defined under FIFA eligibility rules; some limited exceptions apply. Players may hold more than one non-FIFA nationality.

No.	Pos.	Nation	Player
3	DF	RUS	Aleksandr Soldatenkov
4	DF	RUS	Vyacheslav Litvinov
5	MF	RUS	Aleksandr Osipov
6	MF	RUS	Maksim Kuzmin
7	FW	AZE	Ramil Sheydayev
8	MF	RUS	Mikhail Ignatov
9	FW	RUS	Zakhar Fyodorov
11	FW	RUS	Pavel Melyoshin
13	DF	RUS	Igor Kalinin
17	DF	RUS	Artyom Makarchuk
22	DF	RUS	Oleg Kozhemyakin
27	DF	RUS	Kirill Zaika

No.	Pos.	Nation	Player
28	DF	RUS	Ruslan Magal
29	MF	RUS	Roman Yezhov
33	DF	BRA	Marcelo Alves
39	GK	RUS	Matvey Lantrat
44	DF	SRB	Nemanja Stojić
51	GK	RUS	Timofey Mitrov (on loan from Lokomotiv Moscow)
59	FW	RUS	Ruslan Bart
60	MF	RUS	Mark Nosaty
66	MF	RUS	Aleksandr Metsiyev
85	GK	RUS	Daniil Silev
97	MF	BLR	Roman Pasevich

=== Out on loan ===
Note: Flags indicate national team as defined under FIFA eligibility rules; some limited exceptions apply. Players may hold more than one non-FIFA nationality.

No.	Pos.	Nation	Player
—	DF	FRA	Nabil Aberdin (at Farul Constanța until 30 June 2027)
—	DF	RUS	Makar Chirkov (at SKA-Khabarovsk until 30 June 2027)
—	MF	RUS	Maksim Kaynov (at Ural Yekaterinburg until 30 June 2027)

No.	Pos.	Nation	Player
—	MF	RUS	Aleksandr Kovalenko (at Lokomotiv Moscow until 30 June 2027)
—	MF	RUS	Stanislav Topinka (at Dynamo Bryansk until 30 June 2027)
—	FW	VEN	Saúl Guarirapa (at Zhejiang Professional until 31 December 2026)

== Coaching staff ==
- Manager - Robert Moreno
- Assistant managers - Eduardo Docampo, Juan Jose Muñoz Carretero
- Goalkeeping coach - Dmitri Borodin

== Honours ==
- Russian Premier League
  - Runners-up: 2021–22
- Russian Football National League (tier-II)
  - Promoted: 2018–19

== Manager history ==
As of match played 21 May 2022

Name	Nat.	From	To	P	W	D	L	GS	GA	%W	Honours	Notes
Aleksandr Tochilin	Russia		20 November 2019	56	22	16	18	78	59	39.29		
Roman Berezovsky (Caretaker)	Armenia	20 November 2019	8 December 2019	2	0	2	0	2	2	0.00		
Vladimir Fedotov	Russia	8 December 2019		79	40	19	20	137	85	50.63		

== Ownerships, kit suppliers, and sponsors ==
Period	Kit manufacturers	Sponsors	Owner
2018–2021	Nike	No sponsors	Boris Rotenberg
2021–2022	Puma	No sponsors	Boris Rotenberg

== Notable players ==
Had international caps for their respective countries. Players whose name is listed in bold represented their countries while playing for Sochi.

Russia

- (Russia) Denis Adamov
- (Russia) Dmitri Chistyakov
- (Russia) **Soslan Dzhanayev**
- (Russia) Aleksandr Kokorin
- (Russia) Aleksandr Kovalenko
- (Russia) **Fyodor Kudryashov**
- (Russia) **Artyom Makarchuk**
- (Russia) Yevgeni Makeyev
- (Russia) Georgi Melkadze
- (Russia) Andrei Mostovoy
- (Russia) Maksim Mukhin
- (Russia) Elmir Nabiullin
- (Russia) Ivan Novoseltsev
- (Russia) Vladimir Pisarsky
- (Russia) Dmitry Poloz
- (Russia) Danil Prutsev
- (Russia) Aleksandr Soldatenkov
- (Russia) Aleksei Sutormin
- (Russia) **Sergei Terekhov**
- (Russia) Sergei Volkov
- (Russia) Dmitry Vorobyov
- (Russia) Artur Yusupov
- (Russia) **Anton Zabolotny**
- (Russia) Anton Zinkovsky

Europe

- (Armenia) Hovhannes Harutyunyan
- (Armenia) **Aleksandre Karapetian**
- (Armenia) Erik Vardanyan
- (Bulgaria) Ivelin Popov
- (Croatia) Mateo Barać
- (France) Adil Rami
- (Kazakhstan) **Artur Shushenachev**
- (Montenegro) Luka Đorđević
- (Montenegro) **Dušan Lagator**
- (Serbia) Nemanja Stojić
- (Slovenia) **Vanja Drkušić**
- (Slovenia) **Miha Mevlja**

Africa

- (Democratic Republic of the Congo) Giannelli Imbula
- (Guinea) François Kamano
- (Ivory Coast) Victorien Angban
- (Mali) Moussa Sissako
- (Morocco) **Yahia Attiyat Allah**

South America

- (Argentina) Emanuel Mammana
- (Chile) **Ignacio Saavedra**
- (Colombia) Mateo Cassierra
- (Ecuador) Alejandro Cabeza
- (Ecuador) **Christian Noboa**
- (Venezuela) Sergio Córdova
- (Venezuela) Saúl Guarirapa
