= 2022–23 PFC Sochi season =

PFC Sochi
2022–23 season
- Manager: Vadim Garanin (until 25 December); Kurban Berdyev (25 December - 10 April); Dmitri Khokhlov (caretaker) (from 10 April)
- Stadium: Fisht Olympic Stadium
- Premier League: 10th
- Russian Cup: Group Stage
- Top goalscorer: League: Christian Noboa (11); All: Christian Noboa (11)

The 2022–23 PFC Sochi season was Sochi's fourth season in the Russian Premier League, the highest tier of association football in Russia, and their fifth season as a club.

== Season events ==
On 15 June, head coach Vladimir Fedotov left the club after being signed by CSKA Moscow. Five days later, 20 June, Sochi announced Vadim Garanin as their new head coach.

On 25 December Head Coach Vadim Garanin was sacked, with Kurban Berdyev appointed as his replacement.

On 1 March, Sochi announced the signing of Miguel Silveira from Red Bull Bragantino.

On 10 April Head Coach Kurban Berdyev was sacked, with Dmitri Khokhlov appointed as his temporary replacement until the end of the season.

On 30 May, Sochi extended their contract with Nikolai Zabolotny, Timofei Margasov and Nikita Burmistrov. On the same day, Victorien Angban also extended his contract with Sochi, until the summer of 2026.

== Squad ==
As of match played 3 June 2023

No.	Name	Nationality	Position	Date of birth (age)	Signed from	Signed in	Contract ends	Apps.	Goals
Goalkeepers
1	Denis Adamov	(Russia)	GK	20 February 1998 (aged 25)	Krasnodar	2021		32	0
12	Nikolai Zabolotny	(Russia)	GK	16 April 1990 (aged 33)	Rotor Volgograd	2018		68	0
35	Soslan Dzhanayev	(Russia)	GK	3 March 1987 (aged 36)	Miedź Legnica	2019		71	0
Defenders
3	Vanja Drkušić	(Slovenia)	DF	30 October 1999 (aged 23)	Bravo	2022		42	2
4	Moussa Sissako	(Mali)	DF	10 November 2000 (aged 22)	Standard Liège	2022		15	1
13	Sergey Terekhov	(Russia)	DF	27 June 1990 (aged 32)	Orenburg	2021		92	7
17	Artyom Makarchuk	(Russia)	DF	9 November 1995 (aged 27)	Baltika Kaliningrad	2022		45	3
20	Igor Yurganov	(Russia)	DF	10 December 1993 (aged 29)	Dynamo St.Petersburg	2018		91	4
26	Artyom Meshchaninov	(Russia)	DF	19 February 1996 (aged 27)	Baltika Kaliningrad	2022		21	0
27	Kirill Zaika	(Russia)	DF	7 October 1992 (aged 30)	Khimki	2018		112	5
34	Timofei Margasov	(Russia)	DF	12 June 1992 (aged 30)	Lokomotiv Moscow	2020		121	2
45	Ivan Miladinović	(Serbia)	DF	14 August 1994 (aged 28)	Radnički Niš	2018		95	3
Midfielders
5	Victorien Angban	(Ivory Coast)	MF	29 September 1996 (aged 26)	Metz	2021	2026	36	1
6	Artur Yusupov	(Russia)	MF	1 September 1989 (aged 33)	Dynamo Moscow	2020		87	20
8	Kirill Kravtsov	(Russia)	MF	14 June 2002 (aged 20)	Zenit St.Petersburg	2022		29	1
15	Ibragim Tsallagov	(Russia)	MF	12 December 1990 (aged 32)	Zenit St.Petersburg	2019		110	2
16	Christian Noboa	(Ecuador)	MF	9 April 1985 (aged 38)	Zenit St.Petersburg	2019		102	37
18	Nikita Burmistrov	(Russia)	MF	6 July 1989 (aged 33)	Rotor Volgograd	2018		136	13
19	Timofey Shipunov	(Russia)	MF	20 July 2003 (aged 19)	Tver	2022		20	2
22	Joãozinho	(Brazil)	MF	25 December 1988 (aged 34)	Dynamo Moscow	2020		75	9
24	Miguel Silveira	(Brazil)	MF	26 March 2003 (aged 20)	Red Bull Bragantino	2023		2	0
28	Amir Batyrev	(Canada)	MF	11 March 2002 (aged 21)	Tver	2022		12	1
Forwards
9	Georgi Melkadze	(Russia)	FW	4 April 1997 (aged 26)	Spartak Moscow	2022		42	7
10	Vladislav Sarveli	(Russia)	FW	1 October 1997 (aged 25)	Krylia Sovetov	2022		32	5
11	Luka Đorđević	(Montenegro)	FW	9 July 1994 (aged 28)	Vejle	2022		17	2
Away on loan
14	Daniil Martovoy	(Russia)	MF	20 April 2003 (aged 20)	Tver	2022		4	0
23	Kirill Ushatov	(Russia)	MF	24 January 2000 (aged 23)	Tver	2022		11	0
53	Daniil Pavlov	(Russia)	FW	5 June 2002 (aged 20)	Arsenal Tula	2019		4	0
	Vadim Milyutin	(Russia)	DF	8 April 2002 (aged 21)	Academy	2019		1	0
	Maksim Kolmakov	(Russia)	MF	5 January 2003 (aged 20)	Dynamo Brest	2019		1	0
	Aleksandr Kovalenko	(Russia)	MF	8 August 2003 (aged 19)	Krylia Sovetov	2019		0	0
Players that left Sochi during the season
10	Maksim Barsov	(Russia)	FW	29 April 1993 (aged 30)	Dynamo St.Petersburg	2018		53	23

== Transfers ==
=== In ===
Date	Position	Nationality	Name	From	Fee	Ref.
16 June 2022	DF	(Russia)	Artyom Meshchaninov	Baltika Kaliningrad	Undisclosed	
24 June 2022	FW	(Russia)	Vladislav Sarveli	Krylia Sovetov	Undisclosed	
26 June 2022	MF	(Russia)	Timofey Shipunov	Tver	Undisclosed	
26 June 2022	MF	(Russia)	Kirill Ushatov	Tver	Undisclosed	
26 June 2022	FW	(Russia)	Daniil Martovoy	Tver	Undisclosed	
10 July 2022	MF	(Canada)	Amir Batyrev	Tver	Undisclosed	
22 July 2022	MF	(Russia)	Kirill Kravtsov	Zenit St.Petersburg	Undisclosed	
25 July 2022	MF	(Russia)	Aleksandr Kovalenko	Krylia Sovetov	Undisclosed	
1 September 2022	DF	(Mali)	Moussa Sissako	Standard Liège	Undisclosed	
19 September 2022	FW	(Montenegro)	Luka Đorđević	Vejle	Undisclosed	
22 February 2023	MF	(Russia)	Danil Anosov	Salyut Belgorod	Undisclosed	
22 February 2023	MF	(Russia)	David Kirakosyan	Konoplyov football academy	Undisclosed	
1 March 2023	MF	(Brazil)	Miguel Silveira	Red Bull Bragantino	Undisclosed	

=== Out ===
Date	Position	Nationality	Name	To	Fee	Ref.
30 June 2022	FW	(Colombia)	Mateo Cassierra	Zenit St.Petersburg	Undisclosed	
7 July 2022	DF	(Brazil)	Rodrigão	Zenit St.Petersburg	Undisclosed	
11 August 2022	MF	(Russia)	Yegor Prutsev	Red Star Belgrade	Undisclosed	

=== Loans out ===
Date from	Position	Nationality	Name	From	Date to	Ref.
25 July 2022	MF	(Russia)	Maksim Kolmakov	Chayka Peschanokopskoye	End of season	
25 July 2022	MF	(Russia)	Aleksandr Kovalenko	Krylia Sovetov	End of season	
10 August 2022	FW	(Russia)	Daniil Pavlov	Tyumen	End of season	
11 August 2022	DF	(Russia)	Vadim Milyutin	Tyumen	End of season	
21 February 2023	MF	(Russia)	Daniil Martovoy	Rodina Moscow	End of season	
21 February 2023	MF	(Russia)	Kirill Ushatov	Yenisey Krasnoyarsk	End of season	

=== Released ===
Date	Position	Nationality	Name	Joined	Date	Ref.
1 September 2022	FW	(Russia)	Maksim Barsov	Neftekhimik Nizhnekamsk	2 September 2022	

== Competitions ==
=== Overall record ===
Competition	First match	Last match	Starting round	Final position	Record							
Competition	First match	Last match	Starting round	Final position	Pld	W	D	L	GF	GA	GD	Win %
Premier League	17 July 2022	3 June 2023	Matchday 1	10th	30	11	5	14	37	54	−17	36.67
Russian Cup	31 August 2022	26 November 2022	Group stage	Group stage	6	0	1	5	6	13	−7	0.00
Total					36	11	6	19	43	67	−24	30.56

Last updated: 3 June 2023
Source: Soccerway

=== Premier League ===
==== League table ====
Pos	Team	Pld	W	D	L	GF	GA	GD	Pts
8	Lokomotiv Moscow	30	13	6	11	54	46	+8	45 (Note: Lokomotiv and Dynamo tied on head-to-head criteria. Overall goal difference: Lokomotiv +8, Dynamo +4.)
9	Dynamo Moscow	30	13	6	11	49	45	+4	45
10	Sochi	30	11	5	14	37	54	−17	38
11	Ural Yekaterinburg	30	10	6	14	33	45	−12	36
12	Krylia Sovetov Samara	30	8	8	14	32	45	−13	32

Source: Premier Liga
Rules for classification: 1) Points; 2) Head-to-head points; 3) Head-to-head matches won; 4) Head-to-head goal difference; 5) Head-to-head goals scored; 6) Matches won; 7) Goal difference; 8) Goals scored; 9) 2021–22 position (not applicable to final standings); 10) Play-off.

==== Results summary ====
Overall								Home						Away					
Pld	W	D	L	GF	GA	GD	Pts	W	D	L	GF	GA	GD	W	D	L	GF	GA	GD
0	0	0	0	0	0	0	0	0	0	0	0	0	0	0	0	0	0	0	0

Last updated: 25 May 2024.

==== Results by round ====
Round	1
Ground	
Result	
Position	

Updated to match(es) played on 25 May 2024. Source: See Results
A = Away; H = Home; W = Win; D = Draw; L = Loss

==== Results ====
17 July 2022 1	Torpedo Moscow	1–3	Sochi	Khimki
15:00 MSK (UTC+3)	Drkušić 51' (o.g.); Lebedenko (yellow card) 90+'	Report	Yusupov (yellow card) 13'; Yurganov (yellow card) 33'; Tsallagov 35'; Sarveli 37'; Zaika (yellow card) 55'; Drkušić (yellow card) 87'; Melkadze 90+'	Stadium: Arena Khimki; Attendance: 2,329; Referee: Sergey Ivanov

23 July 2022 2	CSKA Moscow	3–0	Sochi	Moscow
15:00 MSK (UTC+3)	Medina 36', 90+'; Carrascal 56'	Report		Stadium: VEB Arena; Attendance: 9,056; Referee: Vladimir Moskalyov

30 July 2022 3	Sochi	2–1	Akhmat Grozny	Sochi
20:00 MSK (UTC+3)	Tsallagov (yellow card) 4'; Meshchaninov (yellow card) 7'; Terekhov (yellow card) 12'; Noboa 20' (pen.), 49' (yellow card) 59'; Angban (yellow card) 45+'; Makarchuk (yellow card) 61'	Report	Todorović (yellow card) 5'; Berisha (yellow card) 21'; Troshechkin 60'	Stadium: Fisht Olympic Stadium; Attendance: 3,772; Referee: Artyom Lyubimov

7 August 2022 4	Sochi	2–1	Pari NN	Sochi
20:00 MSK (UTC+3)	Noboa 32' (pen.); Yusupov 38' (yellow card) 85'	Report	Kornyushin (yellow card) 16'; Aleksandrov (yellow card) 32'; Kobesov (yellow card) 76'; Yuldoshev 84'	Stadium: Fisht Olympic Stadium; Attendance: 3,334; Referee: Anton Frolov

14 August 2022 5	Spartak Moscow	3–0	Sochi	Moscow
20:00 MSK (UTC+3)	Promes 57', 84'; Sobolev (yellow card) 59'; Zinkovsky 71'	Report	Kravtsov (yellow card) 88'	Stadium: Lukoil Arena; Attendance: 11,559; Referee: Vitali Meshkov

20 August 2022 6	Rostov	2–2	Sochi	Rostov-on-Don
20:00 MSK (UTC+3)	Komlichenko (penalty missed) 28'; Chernov (yellow card) 43'; Osipenko (yellow card) 58'; Melnikov 83'; Melyokhin (yellow card) 90' (yellow-red card) 90+2'; Meshchaninov 90+' (o.g.); Utkin (penalty missed) 90+'	Report	Yurganov (yellow card) 23'; Meshchaninov (yellow card) 27'; Noboa 44' (pen.); Makarchuk (yellow card) 68'; Yusupov 69'; Melkadze (yellow card) 88'; Kravtsov (yellow card) 90+'	Stadium: Rostov Arena; Attendance: 5,837; Referee: Vladislav Bezborodov

26 August 2022 7	Sochi	4–1	Khimki	Sochi
20:00 MSK (UTC+3)	Noboa 15' (pen.), 45+' (pen.) (penalty missed) 64'; Melkadze 45+' (yellow card) 67'; Sarveli 86'	Report	Filin (yellow card) 11'; Idowu (yellow card) 45'; Rudenko (yellow card) 49'; Meshchaninov 58' (o.g.); Kamyshev (yellow card) 64'; Gbane (yellow card) 65'; Volkov (yellow card) 90+'	Stadium: Fisht Olympic Stadium; Attendance: 3,185; Referee: Vasily Kazartsev

3 September 2022 8	Krasnodar	2–1	Sochi	Krasnodar
18:30 MSK (UTC+3)	Olusegun 49'; Spertsyan 52'; Banjac (yellow card) 79'; Krivtsov (yellow card) 81'; Córdoba (yellow card) 90+'	Report	Melkadze 65'; Makarchuk (yellow card) 72'; Yurganov (yellow card) 76'; Terekhov (yellow card) 90+'	Stadium: Krasnodar Stadium; Attendance: 27,097; Referee: Pavel Shadykhanov

9 September 2022 9	Sochi	2–1	Dynamo Moscow	Sochi
20:00 MSK (UTC+3)	Melkadze 6'; Noboa 11'; Yusupov (yellow card) 63'; Makarchuk (yellow card) 90+'	Report	Skopintsev (yellow card) 37'; Makarov 40'	Stadium: Fisht Olympic Stadium; Attendance: 4,587; Referee: Kirill Levnikov

24 October 2022 14	Zenit St.Petersburg	7-0	Sochi	Saint Petersburg
20:00 MSK (UTC+3)	Sergeyev 2', 25'; Malcom 11', 74'; Wendel 32'; Barrios 53'; Mantuan 76'	Report	Meshchaninov (red card) 20'	Stadium: Krestovsky Stadium; Attendance: 20,184; Referee: Evgeny Kukulyak

30 October 2022 15	Sochi	2–2	Ural Yekaterinburg	Sochi
14:00 MSK (UTC+3)	Noboa 28' (pen.); Drkušić (yellow card) 29'; Miladinović (yellow card) 45+'; Melkadze (yellow card) 62'; Sissako 76'	Report	Filipenko (yellow card) 27'; Gazinsky 32' (yellow card) 90+'; Kashtanov 73' (pen.); Ranđelović (yellow card) 90+'	Stadium: Fisht Olympic Stadium; Attendance: 1,664; Referee: Anton Frolov

5 November 2022 16	Sochi	1–1	Spartak Moscow	Sochi
14:00 MSK (UTC+3)	Zaika 44'	Report	Promes 7'; Sobolev (yellow card) 10'; Khlusevich (yellow card) 37'	Stadium: Fisht Olympic Stadium; Attendance: 6,172; Referee: Artyom Chistyakov

13 November 2022 17	Khimki	0–2	Sochi	Khimki
16:30 MSK (UTC+3)	Rudenko (yellow card) 23'; Dolgov (yellow card) 35'; Idowu (yellow card) 54'; Kazantsev (red card) 90+'	Report	Melkadze 33'; Terekhov (yellow card) 44'; Kravtsov (yellow card) 52'; Drkušić (yellow card) 74'; Sarveli 85'	Stadium: Arena Khimki; Attendance: 1,897; Referee: Sergey Ivanov

5 March 2023 18	Sochi	2–0	CSKA Moscow	Sochi
19:30 MSK (UTC+3)	Sarveli (yellow card) 10'; Melkadze (yellow card) 66'; Đorđević 71', 78'	Report	Carrascal (yellow card) 63'; Glebov (yellow card) 90+'	Stadium: Fisht Olympic Stadium; Attendance: 4,419; Referee: Vladislav Bezborodov

1 April 2023 21	Dynamo Moscow	0–2	Sochi	Moscow
14:00 MSK (UTC+3)	Fomin (penalty missed) 29'; Normann (yellow card) 35'; Fernández (yellow card) 57'	Report	Dzhanayev (red card) 25'; Zaika (yellow card) 47'; Drkušić 67'; Makarchuk 74'	Stadium: VTB Arena; Attendance: 5,109; Referee: Roman Galimov

15 April 2023 23	Sochi	0–2	Krasnodar	Sochi
16:30 MSK (UTC+3)	Margasov (yellow card) 86'	Report	Batxi 40'; Krivtsov 48'; Chernikov (yellow card) 56'; Kaio (yellow card) 74'	Stadium: Fisht Olympic Stadium; Attendance: 3,129; Referee: Vitali Meshkov

23 April 2023 24	Akhmat Grozny	1–0	Sochi	Grozny
16:30 MSK (UTC+3)	Bogosavac (yellow card) 45+'; Ilyin 86'	Report	Terekhov (yellow card) 20'	Stadium: Akhmat-Arena; Attendance: 4,431; Referee: Artur Fedorov

30 April 2023 25	Sochi	3–1	Torpedo Moscow	Sochi
16:30 MSK (UTC+3)	Joãozinho 7'; Kravtsov 45'; Zaika 74'	Report	Caimacov 79'	Stadium: Fisht Olympic Stadium; Attendance: 1,831; Referee: Artyom Chistyakov

14 May 2023 27	Sochi	1–0	Rostov	Sochi
19:00 MSK (UTC+3)	Shipunov 89'	Report	Melyokhin (yellow card) 42'	Stadium: Fisht Olympic Stadium; Attendance: 2,787; Referee: Yan Bobrovsky

22 May 2023 28	Pari NN	4–0	Sochi	Nizhny Novgorod
19:00 MSK (UTC+3)	Aleksandrov 52'; Sevikyan (yellow card) 59'; Rybchinsky 62'; Krotov 86'; Mikhaylov (yellow card) 90'; Kakkoyev 90+'	Report	Drkušić (yellow card) 47' (yellow-red card) 70'; Margasov (yellow card) 60'	Stadium: Nizhny Novgorod Stadium; Attendance: 5,267; Referee: Kirill Levnikov

27 May 2023 29	Sochi	1–1	Zenit St.Petersburg	Sochi
19:00 MSK (UTC+3)	Yusupov 1'; Terekhov (yellow card) 13'; Joãozinho (yellow card) 84'	Report	Mantuan 50'	Stadium: Fisht Olympic Stadium; Attendance: 5,049; Referee: Rafael Shafeev

3 June 2023 30	Ural Yekaterinburg	1–0	Sochi	Yekaterinburg
17:00 MSK (UTC+3)	Kulakov (yellow card) 55'; Yegorychev 89'	Report		Stadium: Central Stadium; Attendance: 6,810; Referee: Vladimir Moskalyov

=== Russian Cup ===
==== Group stage ====
Pos	Team	Pld	W	PW	PL	L	GF	GA	GD	Pts	Qualification
1	Ural Yekaterinburg	6	4	1	0	1	9	5	+4	14	Qualification to the Knockout phase (RPL path)
2	CSKA Moscow	6	4	0	1	1	8	4	+4	13	Qualification to the Knockout phase (RPL path)
3	Torpedo Moscow	6	2	0	1	3	6	7	−1	7	Qualification to the Knockout phase (regions path)
4	Sochi	6	0	1	0	5	6	13	−7	2	

Source: Russian Football Union (in Russian), Soccerway
Rules for classification: 1) Points; 2) Head-to-head points; 3) Head-to-head matches won; 4) Head-to-head goal difference; 5) Head-to-head goals scored; 6) Matches won; 7) Goal difference; 8) Goals scored; 9) Penalty shoot-out goal difference; 10) Draw.

31 August 2022 1	Ural Yekaterinburg	2–0	Sochi	Yekaterinburg
15:00 MSK (UTC+3)	Yushin 8' (yellow card) 60'; Gazinsky (yellow card) 18'; Yurganov 58' (o.g.)	Report	Miladinović (yellow card) 58'; Sarveli (yellow card) 90+2'	Stadium: Yekaterinburg Arena; Attendance: 5,122; Referee: Evgeny Turbin

14 September 2022 2	Sochi	1–3	Torpedo Moscow	Sochi
15:00 MSK (UTC+3)	Batyrev 21'; Miladinović (yellow card) 59'	Report	Caimacov (yellow card) 8'; Karayev 54'; Lebedenko 60'; Smolnikov (yellow card) 73'; Ryazantsev 75'	Stadium: Fisht Olympic Stadium; Attendance: 2,411; Referee: Vladimir Moskalyov

28 September 2022 3	CSKA Moscow	2–1	Sochi	Moscow
20:00 MSK (UTC+3)	Kuchayev 23'; Chalov 73'	Report	Đorđević (yellow card) 39'; Sarveli 52'; Dzhanayev (yellow card) 85'	Stadium: VEB Arena; Attendance: 2,440; Referee: Aleksey Sukhoy

20 October 2022 4	Sochi	2–3	Ural Yekaterinburg	Sochi
18:00 MSK (UTC+3)	Yurganov 36'; Burmistrov 84' (yellow card) 90+10'; Miladinović (yellow card) 90+10'; Terekhov (yellow card) 90+10'	Report	Gazinsky 27', 39'; Yushin (yellow card) 32'; Kashtanov (yellow card) 49' (yellow-red card) 90+10'; Vloet 56'; Goglichidze (yellow card) 69'; Gadzhimuradov (yellow card) 90+2' (yellow-red card) 90+10'; Cissé (yellow card) 90+10'	Stadium: Fisht Olympic Stadium; Attendance: 2,739; Referee: Ivan Sidenkov

22 November 2022 5	Torpedo Moscow	1–1 (2–4 p)	Sochi	Moscow
20:00 MSK (UTC+3)	Savić (yellow card) 17'; Laptev (yellow card) 24'; Karayev 56'; Samsonov (yellow card) 76'; Šapić (yellow card) 77'	Report	Yusupov (yellow card) 29'; Margasov (yellow card) 45+1'; Joãozinho 51' (yellow card) 76'; Melkadze (yellow card) 62'	Stadium: Luzhniki Stadium; Attendance: 1,170; Referee: Artur Fyodorov
	Penalties
	Samsonov (penalty missed); Smolnikov (penalty missed); Roganović (penalty scored); Kutepov (penalty scored)		(penalty scored) Makarchuk; (penalty missed) Sissako; (penalty scored) Drkušić; (penalty scored) Melkadze; (penalty scored) Terekhov

26 November 2022 6	Sochi	1–2	CSKA Moscow	Sochi
16:00 MSK (UTC+3)	Drkušić 45+2'; Zaika (yellow card) 64'; Kravtsov (yellow card) 65'	Report	Yermakov 4'; Gajić (yellow card) 45+1'; Yurganov 60' (o.g.)	Stadium: Fisht Olympic Stadium; Attendance: 3,997; Referee: Aleksey Amelin

== Squad statistics ==
As of match played 3 June 2023

=== Appearances and goals ===
No.	Pos	Nat	Player	Total		Premier League		Russian Cup	
No.	Pos	Nat	Player	Apps	Goals	Apps	Goals	Apps	Goals
1	GK	(Russia) RUS	Denis Adamov	21	0	16+1	0	4	0
3	DF	(Slovenia) SLO	Vanja Drkušić	31	2	26	1	4+1	1
4	DF	(Mali) MLI	Moussa Sissako	15	1	2+8	1	1+4	0
5	MF	(Ivory Coast) CIV	Victorien Angban	7	0	6+1	0	0	0
6	MF	(Russia) RUS	Artur Yusupov	30	3	25+1	3	3+1	0
8	MF	(Russia) RUS	Kirill Kravtsov	29	1	12+12	1	5	0
9	FW	(Russia) RUS	Georgi Melkadze	28	5	18+6	5	1+3	0
10	FW	(Russia) RUS	Vladislav Sarveli	32	5	15+11	4	3+3	1
11	FW	(Montenegro) MNE	Luka Đorđević	17	2	7+6	2	3+1	0
12	GK	(Russia) RUS	Nikolai Zabolotny	6	0	5	0	0+1	0
13	DF	(Russia) RUS	Sergey Terekhov	31	0	27	0	3+1	0
15	DF	(Russia) RUS	Ibragim Tsallagov	18	1	13+5	1	0	0
16	MF	(Ecuador) ECU	Christian Noboa	27	11	24+2	11	0+1	0
17	DF	(Russia) RUS	Artyom Makarchuk	35	1	25+4	1	4+2	0
18	MF	(Russia) RUS	Nikita Burmistrov	25	1	13+8	0	2+2	1
19	MF	(Russia) RUS	Timofey Shipunov	20	2	3+12	2	3+2	0
20	DF	(Russia) RUS	Igor Yurganov	24	1	19+1	0	3+1	1
22	MF	(Brazil) BRA	Joãozinho	28	4	12+11	3	5	1
24	MF	(Brazil) BRA	Miguel Silveira	2	0	0+2	0	0	0
26	DF	(Russia) RUS	Artyom Meshchaninov	21	0	13+4	0	4	0
27	DF	(Russia) RUS	Kirill Zaika	27	2	15+10	2	2	0
28	MF	(Canada) CAN	Amir Batyrev	12	1	2+7	0	1+2	1
34	DF	(Russia) RUS	Timofei Margasov	32	0	21+5	0	6	0
35	GK	(Russia) RUS	Soslan Dzhanayev	11	0	9	0	2	0
45	DF	(Serbia) SRB	Ivan Miladinović	12	0	7+2	0	2+1	0
Players away from the club on loan:
14	MF	(Russia) RUS	Daniil Martovoy	4	0	0+1	0	2+1	0
23	MF	(Russia) RUS	Kirill Ushatov	11	0	0+7	0	3+1	0
Players who appeared for Sochi but left during the season:
11	FW	(Russia) RUS	Maksim Barsov	1	0	0	0	1	0

=== Goal scorers ===
Place	Position	Nation	Number	Name	Premier League	Russian Cup	Total
1	MF	(Ecuador)	16	Christian Noboa	11	0	11
2	FW	(Russia)	9	Georgi Melkadze	5	0	5
2	FW	(Russia)	10	Vladislav Sarveli	4	1	5
4	MF	(Brazil)	22	Joãozinho	3	1	4
5	MF	(Russia)	6	Artur Yusupov	3	0	3
6	MF	(Russia)	27	Kirill Zaika	2	0	2
6	MF	(Russia)	19	Timofey Shipunov	2	0	2
6	FW	(Montenegro)	11	Luka Đorđević	2	0	2
6	DF	(Slovenia)	3	Vanja Drkušić	1	1	2
10	DF	(Mali)	4	Moussa Sissako	1	0	1
10	DF	(Russia)	17	Artyom Makarchuk	1	0	1
10	MF	(Russia)	8	Kirill Kravtsov	1	0	1
10	DF	(Russia)	15	Ibragim Tsallagov	1	0	1
10	MF	(Canada)	28	Amir Batyrev	0	1	1
10	DF	(Russia)	20	Igor Yurganov	0	1	1
10	MF	(Russia)	18	Nikita Burmistrov	0	1	1
Total					37	6	43

=== Clean sheets ===
Place	Position	Nation	Number	Name	Premier League	Russian Cup	Total
1	GK	(Russia)	35	Soslan Dzhanayev	3	0	3
3	GK	(Russia)	1	Denis Adamov	2	0	2
2	GK	(Russia)	12	Nikolai Zabolotny	1	0	1
Total					5	0	5

Soslan Dzhanayev & Denis Adamov both played in Sochi's 2-0 victory over Dynamo Moscow on 1 April 2023

=== Disciplinary record ===
Number	Nation	Position	Name	Premier League		Russian Cup		Total	
Number	Nation	Position	Name	Yellow card	Red card	Yellow card	Red card	Yellow card	Red card
3	(Slovenia)	DF	Vanja Drkušić	7	1	0	0	7	1
4	(Mali)	DF	Moussa Sissako	1	1	0	0	1	1
5	(Ivory Coast)	MF	Victorien Angban	1	0	0	0	1	0
6	(Russia)	MF	Artur Yusupov	4	0	1	0	5	0
8	(Russia)	MF	Kirill Kravtsov	3	0	1	0	4	0
9	(Russia)	FW	Georgi Melkadze	9	1	1	0	10	1
10	(Russia)	FW	Vladislav Sarveli	2	0	1	0	3	0
11	(Montenegro)	FW	Luka Đorđević	1	0	1	0	2	0
13	(Russia)	DF	Sergey Terekhov	8	0	1	0	9	0
15	(Russia)	MF	Ibragim Tsallagov	3	0	0	0	3	0
16	(Ecuador)	MF	Christian Noboa	5	0	0	0	5	0
17	(Russia)	DF	Artyom Makarchuk	4	0	0	0	4	0
18	(Russia)	MF	Nikita Burmistrov	1	0	1	0	2	0
19	(Russia)	MF	Timofey Shipunov	1	0	0	0	1	0
20	(Russia)	DF	Igor Yurganov	4	0	0	0	4	0
22	(Brazil)	MF	Joãozinho	1	0	1	0	2	0
26	(Russia)	DF	Artyom Meshchaninov	3	1	0	0	3	1
27	(Russia)	MF	Kirill Zaika	3	0	1	0	4	0
28	(Canada)	MF	Amir Batyrev	1	0	0	0	1	0
34	(Russia)	DF	Timofei Margasov	2	0	1	0	3	0
35	(Russia)	GK	Soslan Dzhanayev	0	1	1	0	1	1
45	(Serbia)	DF	Ivan Miladinović	1	0	3	0	4	0
Players away on loan:
Players who left Sochi during the season:
Total				65	5	14	0	79	5
