= 2022–23 FC Rostov season =

FC Rostov
2022–23 season
- Chairman: Artashes Arutyunyants
- Manager: Valeri Karpin
- Stadium: Rostov Arena
- Premier League: 4th
- Russian Cup: Regions path Semi-finals Stage 1
- Top goalscorer: League: Nikolay Komlichenko (10); All: Nikolay Komlichenko (12)
Home colours	Away colours

The 2022–23 season was FC Rostov's 93rd season in existence and the club's 14th consecutive season in the top flight of Russian football.

== Squad ==
As of match played 3 June 2023

No.	Name	Nationality	Position	Date of birth (age)	Signed from	Signed in	Contract ends	Apps.	Goals
Goalkeepers
1	Nikita Medvedev	(Russia)	GK	17 December 1994 (aged 28)	Rubin Kazan	2022		24	0
30	Sergei Pesyakov	(Russia)	GK	16 December 1988 (aged 34)	Spartak Moscow	2017		157	0
78	Mikhail Tsulaya	(Russia)	GK	8 February 2005 (aged 18)	Academy	2022		1	0
Defenders
4	Denis Terentyev	(Russia)	DF	13 August 1992 (aged 30)	Zenit St.Petersburg	2020		112	1
18	Danila Prokhin	(Russia)	DF	24 May 2001 (aged 22)	Zenit St.Petersburg	2021		25	1
28	Yevgeni Chernov	(Russia)	DF	23 October 1992 (aged 30)	on loan from Krasnodar	2022	2023	84	0
45	Aleksandr Silyanov	(Russia)	DF	17 February 2001 (aged 22)	Lokomotiv Moscow	2022		49	3
55	Maksim Osipenko	(Russia)	DF	16 May 1994 (aged 29)	Tambov	2020	2024	102	9
71	Nikolai Poyarkov	(Russia)	DF	16 October 1999 (aged 23)	Lokomotiv Moscow	2019		34	0
87	Andrei Langovich	(Russia)	DF	28 May 2003 (aged 20)	Academy	2021	2027	49	3
92	Viktor Melyokhin	(Russia)	DF	16 December 2003 (aged 19)	Academy	2021	2027	52	0
Midfielders
8	Aleksei Mironov	(Russia)	MF	1 January 2000 (aged 23)	Lokomotiv Moscow	2022		34	1
15	Danil Glebov	(Russia)	MF	3 November 1999 (aged 23)	Anzhi Makhachkala	2019		129	9
19	Khoren Bayramyan	(Armenia)	MF	7 January 1992 (aged 31)	Academy	2011		176	11
23	Roman Tugarev	(Russia)	MF	22 July 1998 (aged 24)	Lokomotiv Moscow	2021		61	7
38	Aleksandr Selyava	(Belarus)	MF	17 May 1992 (aged 31)	Dinamo Minsk	2021		25	1
47	Daniil Utkin	(Russia)	MF	12 October 1999 (aged 23)	Krasnodar	2022		35	3
62	Ivan Komarov	(Russia)	MF	15 April 2003 (aged 20)	Academy	2020		14	0
77	Stepan Melnikov	(Russia)	MF	25 April 2002 (aged 21)	Spartak Moscow	2022	2026	22	2
88	Kirill Shchetinin	(Russia)	MF	17 January 2002 (aged 21)	Zenit St.Petersburg	2022		52	4
Forwards
7	Dmitry Poloz	(Russia)	FW	12 July 1991 (aged 31)	Sochi	2020		242	58
26	David Toshevski	(North Macedonia)	FW	16 July 2001 (aged 21)	Rabotnički	2020	2025	9	0
27	Nikolay Komlichenko	(Russia)	FW	29 June 1995 (aged 27)	Dynamo Moscow	2022		62	20
69	Yegor Golenkov	(Russia)	FW	7 July 1999 (aged 23)	Sigma Olomouc	2022	2026	49	8
Youth team
Contracts suspended
8	Armin Gigović	(Sweden)	MF	6 April 2002 (aged 21)	Helsingborgs IF	2020	2025	30	1
Out on loan
29	Aleksandr Mukhin	(Russia)	DF	28 April 2002 (aged 21)	Lokomotiv Moscow	2021		8	0
89	Artyom Muamba	(Russia)	FW	19 April 2003 (aged 20)	Academy	2021		8	0
Left during the season

== Transfers ==
=== Out ===
Date	Position	Nationality	Name	To	Fee	Ref.
21 January 2023	DF	(Russia)	Aleksandr Smirnov	Kuban Krasnodar	Undisclosed	
2 February 2023	FW	(Russia)	Maksim Stavtsev	Zorkiy Krasnogorsk	Undisclosed	
18 February 2023	DF	(Russia)	Daniil Yeryomin	Kaluga	Undisclosed	

=== Loans out ===
Date from	Position	Nationality	Name	To	Date to	Ref.
22 February 2022	MF	(Russia)	Kirill Bozhenov	Khimki	7 March 2023	
11 March 2022	DF	(Bosnia and Herzegovina)	Dennis Hadžikadunić	Malmö	31 December 2022	
16 July 2022	MF	(Russia)	Kirill Folmer	Akhmat Grozny	26 January 2023	
18 January 2023	DF	(Bosnia and Herzegovina)	Dennis Hadžikadunić	Mallorca	End of season	
1 February 2023	MF	(Russia)	Kirill Folmer	Baltika Kaliningrad	End of season	
2 February 2023	DF	(Russia)	Aleksandr Mukhin	Ufa	End of season	
22 February 2023	DF	(Russia)	Konstantin Kovalyov	Avangard Kursk	End of season	
22 February 2023	MF	(Russia)	Kirill Bozhenov	Dynamo Makhachkala	End of season	
22 February 2023	FW	(Russia)	Artyom Ntumba	Veles Moscow	End of season	

=== Contract suspensions ===
Date	Position	Nationality	Name	Joined	Date	Ref.
31 August 2022	MF	(Sweden)	Armin Gigović	OB	31 December 2022	
15 January 2023	MF	(Sweden)	Armin Gigović	Midtjylland	End of season	

== Competitions ==
=== Overview ===
Competition	First match	Last match	Starting round	Final position	Record							
Competition	First match	Last match	Starting round	Final position	Pld	W	D	L	GF	GA	GD	Win %
Premier League	17 July 2022	3 June 2023	Matchday 1	4th	30	15	8	7	48	44	+4	50.00
Russian Cup	31 August 2022	6 April 2023	Round of 32	Regions path Semi-finals Stage 1	10	4	2	4	16	15	+1	40.00
Total					40	19	10	11	64	59	+5	47.50

Last updated: 3 June 2023
Source: See Results

=== Premier League ===
==== League table ====
Pos	Team	Pld	W	D	L	GF	GA	GD	Pts
2	CSKA Moscow	30	17	7	6	56	27	+29	58
3	Spartak Moscow	30	15	9	6	60	38	+22	54
4	Rostov	30	15	8	7	48	44	+4	53
5	Akhmat Grozny	30	15	5	10	51	39	+12	50
6	Krasnodar	30	13	9	8	62	46	+16	48

Source: Premier Liga
Rules for classification: 1) Points; 2) Head-to-head points; 3) Head-to-head matches won; 4) Head-to-head goal difference; 5) Head-to-head goals scored; 6) Matches won; 7) Goal difference; 8) Goals scored; 9) 2021–22 position (not applicable to final standings); 10) Play-off.

==== Results summary ====
Overall								Home						Away					
Pld	W	D	L	GF	GA	GD	Pts	W	D	L	GF	GA	GD	W	D	L	GF	GA	GD
30	15	8	7	48	44	+4	53	9	3	3	25	20	+5	6	5	4	23	24	−1

Last updated: 3 June 2023.
Source: See Results

==== Results by round ====
Round	1	2	3	4	5	6	7	8	9	10	11	12	13	14	15	16	17	18	19	20	21	22	23	24	25	26	27	28	29	30
Ground	A	A	H	H	A	H	H	A	H	H	A	H	H	A	A	H	A	H	H	A	H	A	H	A	A	H	A	A	H	A
Result	D	D	W	W	W	D	D	W	W	W	L	W	L	D	W	W	W	L	W	W	W	D	D	W	D	L	L	L	W	L
Position	10	11	6	6	3	5	5	5	3	2	3	2	4	4	4	3	3	3	3	2	2	2	2	2	2	3	3	4	4	4

Updated to match(es) played on 3 June 2023. Source: See Results
A = Away; H = Home; W = Win; D = Draw; L = Loss

==== Results ====
17 July 2022 1	Dynamo Moscow	1 – 1	Rostov	Moscow
20:00 MSK (UTC+3)	Grulyov 16'; Makarov (yellow card) 31'; Karapuzov (yellow card) 90+'	Report	Bayramyan (yellow card) 38'; Poloz (yellow card) 43'; Komlichenko 68'	Stadium: VTB Arena; Attendance: 15,124; Referee: Pavel Kukuyan

24 July 2022 2	Lokomotiv Moscow	2 – 2	Rostov	Moscow
20:00 MSK (UTC+3)	Miranchuk 35' (pen.) (yellow card) 36'; Beka Beka (yellow card) 50' (yellow-red card) 65'; Maradishvili 90+' (yellow card) 90+'; Jedvaj (yellow card) 90+'; Kulikov (yellow card) FT; Isidor (yellow card) FT	Report	Komlichenko 4'; Poloz (yellow card) 30'; Prokhin (yellow card) 34'; Mironov (yellow card) 65'; Utkin 88'	Stadium: RZD Arena; Attendance: 9,435; Referee: Alexey Sukhoi

31 July 2022 3	Rostov	1 – 0	Khimki	Rostov-on-Don
20:00 MSK (UTC+3)	Mironov (yellow card) 27'; Komlichenko 40' (yellow card) 45+'; Prokhin (yellow card) 69' (yellow-red card) 78'; Golenkov (yellow card) 88'	Report	Bozhenov (yellow card) 14'; Chyorny (yellow card) 34'; Tikhy (yellow card) 51'	Stadium: Rostov Arena; Attendance: 5,313; Referee: Vladislav Bezborodov

7 August 2022 4	Rostov	2 – 1	Orenburg	Rostov-on-Don
20:00 MSK (UTC+3)	Poloz 45+' (pen.); Komlichenko 60' (pen.); Pesyakov (yellow card) 68'; Utkin (yellow card) 90+'; Mironov (yellow card) 90+'	Report	Sivakow (yellow card) 2'; Malykh (yellow card) 33'; Pavlovets (yellow card) 34'; Ektov (yellow card) 59'; Vorobyov 69' (pen.)	Stadium: Rostov Arena; Attendance: 4,458; Referee: Vasily Kazartsev

14 August 2022 5	Pari NN	3 – 4	Rostov	Nizhny Novgorod
17:30 MSK (UTC+3)	Maiga (yellow card) 14'; Kalinsky 20' (pen.); Yuldoshev (yellow card) 30'; Milson 66'; Suleymanov 82'; Kalinsky (yellow card) 87'	Report	Poloz 15' (pen.), 57' (yellow card) 19'; Utkin (yellow card) 26' (goal) 39'; Glebov 68'	Stadium: Nizhny Novgorod Stadium; Attendance: 5,784; Referee: Pavel Shadykhanov

20 August 2022 6	Rostov	2 – 2	Sochi	Rostov-on-Don
20:00 MSK (UTC+3)	Komlichenko (penalty missed) 28'; Chernov (yellow card) 43'; Osipenko (yellow card) 58'; Melnikov 83'; Melyokhin (yellow card) 90' (yellow-red card) 90+2'; Meshchaninov 90+' (o.g.); Utkin (penalty missed) 90+'	Report	Yurganov (yellow card) 23'; Meshchaninov (yellow card) 27'; Noboa 44' (pen.); Makarchuk (yellow card) 68'; Yusupov 69'; Melkadze (yellow card) 88'; Kravtsov (yellow card) 90+'	Stadium: Rostov Arena; Attendance: 5,837; Referee: Vladislav Bezborodov

28 August 2022 7	Rostov	0 – 0	CSKA Moscow	Rostov-on-Don
19:45 MSK (UTC+3)	Komlichenko (yellow card) 41'	Report	Carrascal (yellow card) 30'	Stadium: Rostov Arena; Attendance: 8,616; Referee: Vitali Meshkov

5 September 2022 8	Torpedo Moscow	0 – 1	Rostov	Khimki
20:00 MSK (UTC+3)	Smolnikov (yellow card) 11'; Erkinov (yellow card) 13'; Reikhmen (yellow card) 19'; Lebedenko (yellow card) 43'; Yenin (yellow card) 59'; Kutepov (yellow card) 90+'; Kozhemyakin (yellow card) 90+'; Samsonov (yellow card) 90+'; Baburin (yellow card) 90+'; Netfullin (yellow card) 90+'	Report	Osipenko 90+' (pen.)	Stadium: Arena Khimki; Attendance: 1,093; Referee: Yan Bobrovsky

11 September 2022 9	Rostov	4 – 2	Spartak Moscow	Rostov-on-Don
19:45 MSK (UTC+3)	Poloz 28', 71' (pen.); Utkin 34' (yellow card) 90+'; Komlichenko 53'	Report	Promes 24'; Rybus (yellow card) 69'; Sobolev 76' (yellow card) 90+'; Maslov (yellow card) 88'	Stadium: Rostov Arena; Attendance: 10,797; Referee: Sergei Karasev

17 September 2022 10	Rostov	2 – 1	Krylia Sovetov	Rostov-on-Don
16:30 MSK (UTC+3)	Bayramyan 1'; Poloz 67' (pen.); Silyanov (yellow card) 76'; Chernov (yellow card) 80'	Report	Pinyayev 12' (yellow card) 31'; Soldatenkov (yellow card) 36'; Yevgenyev (yellow card) 74'	Stadium: Rostov Arena; Attendance: 5,200; Referee: Pavel Kukuyan

2 October 2022 11	Zenit St.Petersburg	3 – 1	Rostov	Saint Petersburg
16:30 MSK (UTC+3)	Malcom 14'; Wendel 65'; Kuzyayev 77'	Report	Komlichenko 47'	Stadium: Krestovsky Stadium; Attendance: 40,346; Referee: Vladimir Moskalyov

9 October 2022 12	Rostov	3 – 2	Krasnodar	Rostov-on-Don
19:00 MSK (UTC+3)	Pesyakov (yellow card) 48'; Silyanov 51'; Poloz 59' (pen.) (yellow card) 80'; Mironov 75'; Golenkov (yellow card) 90'	Report	Olusegun 1'; Pina (yellow card) 11'; Kaio (yellow card) 11' (yellow-red card) 57'; Córdoba 32' (yellow card) 90'	Stadium: Rostov Arena; Attendance: 8,325; Referee: Vitali Meshkov

14 October 2022 13	Rostov	1 – 2	Ural Yekaterinburg	Rostov-on-Don
19:30 MSK (UTC+3)	Tugarev 26' (pen.); Mironov (yellow card) 64'; Glebov (yellow card) 90+'; Shchetinin (yellow card) 90+'	Report	Ranđelović 19'; Cissé (yellow card) 45+'; Beveyev (yellow card) 47' (yellow-red card) 90+'; Vloet 72'; Pomazun (yellow card) 88'; Emmerson (yellow card) 90+'	Stadium: Rostov Arena; Attendance: 4,480; Referee: Evgeny Turbin

22 October 2022 14	Fakel Voronezh	1 – 1	Rostov	Voronezh
16:30 MSK (UTC+3)	Appayev (yellow card) 6'; Maksimov (penalty missed) 9'; Dmitriyev (red card) 44'; Akbashev (yellow card) 60'; Gongadze 90+' (pen.) (yellow card) 90+'	Report	Glebov 50'; Chernov (yellow card) 90+'	Stadium: Tsentralnyi Profsoyuz Stadion; Attendance: 13,980; Referee: Pavel Shadykhanov

29 October 2022 15	Akhmat Grozny	1 – 2	Rostov	Grozny
16:30 MSK (UTC+3)	Konaté 14'; Shvets (yellow card) 64'; Berisha (yellow card) 71'; Agalarov (yellow card) 83'	Report	Mironov (yellow card) 36'; Komlichenko 75' (yellow card) 90'; Silyanov 86'	Stadium: Akhmat-Arena; Attendance: 8,047; Referee: Vladislav Bezborodov

6 November 2022 16	Rostov	2 – 1	Dynamo Moscow	Rostov-on-Don
19:00 MSK (UTC+3)	Tugarev (yellow card) 44'; Shchetinin 66'; Melyokhin (yellow card) 74'; Glebov 83' (yellow card) 90+'; Golenkov (yellow card) 90+'; Langovich (yellow card) 90+'	Report	Zakharyan (yellow card) 20'; Makarov (yellow card) 42'; Laxalt (yellow card) 73'; Tyukavin 87'	Stadium: Rostov Arena; Attendance: 5,214; Referee: Vladimir Moskalyov

12 November 2022 17	Krylia Sovetov	1 – 3	Rostov	Samara
14:00 MSK (UTC+3)	Yezhov (yellow card) 39'; Rahmanović (yellow card) 45+'; Shitov 73'; Soldatenkov (yellow card) 74'; Tsypchenko (yellow card) 84'	Report	Glebov 28'; Poloz 38' (pen.); Bayramyan (yellow card) 72'; Osipenko 75'	Stadium: Solidarnost Samara Arena; Attendance: 4,046; Referee: Artyom Lyubimov

4 March 2023 18	Rostov	1 – 3	Lokomotiv Moscow	Rostov-on-Don
19:30 MSK (UTC+3)	Komlichenko (yellow card) 54' (goal) 87'	Report	Dzyuba 33', 57', 64'; Kuzmichyov (yellow card) 34'; Barinov (yellow card) 60'; Glushenkov (yellow card) 77'	Stadium: Rostov Arena; Attendance: 4,907; Referee: Sergei Karasev

12 March 2023 19	Rostov	2 – 1	Pari NN	Rostov-on-Don
19:30 MSK (UTC+3)	Langovich 55'; Osipenko 90+' (pen.); Tugarev (yellow card) FT	Report	Maiga (yellow card) 62'; Suleymanov 64'; Kornyushin (yellow card) 90+'; Mikhaylov (yellow card) FT	Stadium: Rostov Arena; Attendance: 4,394; Referee: Anton Frolov

19 March 2023 20	Khimki	0 – 1	Rostov	Khimki
14:00 MSK (UTC+3)	Bikel (red card) 29'; Léo Andrade (yellow card) 90+2'	Report	Osipenko 18' (pen.); Utkin (yellow card) 79'	Stadium: Arena Khimki; Attendance: 696; Referee: Vladimir Moskalyov

2 April 2023 21	Rostov	2 – 1	Torpedo Moscow	Rostov-on-Don
19:00 MSK (UTC+3)	Poloz (penalty missed) 35'; Glebov (red card) 42'; Langovich 45'; Chernov 53'; Mironov (yellow card) 84'	Report	Turishchev (yellow card) 34'; Karaev 59'	Stadium: Rostov Arena; Attendance: 6,300; Referee: Alexey Amelin

10 April 2023 22	Orenburg	2 – 2	Rostov	Orenburg
17:00 MSK (UTC+3)	Florentín (yellow card) 3'; Mansilla 14' (yellow card) 82'; Obukhov 22' (yellow card) 56'; Stamatov (yellow card) 62'; Pérez (yellow card) FT	Report	Tugarev (yellow card) 18'; Chernov (yellow card) 19'; Prokhin (yellow card) 34'; Shchetinin (yellow card) 45+'; Golenkov 80' (yellow card) FT; Bayramyan (yellow card) 82'; Osipenko 89'	Stadium: Gazovik Stadium; Attendance: 4,581; Referee: Roman Safyan

16 April 2023 23	Rostov	0 – 0	Zenit St.Petersburg	Rostov-on-Don
19:00 MSK (UTC+3)	Mironov (yellow card) 38'; Silyanov (yellow card) 41'; Komarov (yellow card) 74'	Report	Claudinho (yellow card) 32'	Stadium: Rostov Arena; Attendance: 13,711; Referee: Sergei Karasev

23 April 2023 24	Ural Yekaterinburg	1 – 3	Rostov	Yekaterinburg
12:00 MSK (UTC+3)	Yegorychev (yellow card) 40'; Miškić 80' (yellow card) 82'; Beveyev (yellow card) 90+'	Report	Komlichenko 19', 48'; Bayramyan (yellow card) 68'; Langovich (yellow card) 70'; Osipenko 90' (pen.) (yellow card) 90'	Stadium: Central Stadium; Attendance: 5,561; Referee: Pavel Kukuyan

29 April 2023 25	Spartak Moscow	1 – 1	Rostov	Moscow
19:30 MSK (UTC+3)	Litvinov (yellow card) 27'; Sobolev (yellow card) 33' (goal) 90+'	Report	Langovich (yellow card) 45+'; Melyokhin (yellow card) 77'; Selyava 80'; Glebov (yellow card) 89'; Pesyakov (yellow card) 90+'; Mironov (yellow card) 90+'	Stadium: Lukoil Arena; Attendance: 10,568; Referee: Kirill Levnikov

6 May 2023 26	Rostov	0 – 2	Fakel Voronezh	Rostov-on-Don
19:00 MSK (UTC+3)	Bayramyan (yellow card) 78'	Report	Akbashev (yellow card) 34' (goal) 46'; Suslov (yellow card) 60'; Appayev 74'	Stadium: Rostov Arena; Attendance: 11,010; Referee: Evgeniy Kukulyak

14 May 2023 27	Sochi	1 – 0	Rostov	Sochi
19:00 MSK (UTC+3)	Shipunov 89'	Report	Melyokhin (yellow card) 42'	Stadium: Fisht Olympic Stadium; Attendance: 2,787; Referee: Yan Bobrovsky

21 May 2023 28	Krasnodar	3 – 0	Rostov	Krasnodar
19:00 MSK (UTC+3)	Ionov 3'; Córdoba 10'; Koksharov 33'	Report	Melyokhin (yellow card) 41'	Stadium: Krasnodar Stadium; Attendance: 17,069; Referee: Artyom Lyubimov

28 May 2023 29	Rostov	3 – 2	Akhmat Grozny	Rostov-on-Don
19:00 MSK (UTC+3)	Golenkov 6', 12' (yellow card) 45+'; Mironov (yellow card) 45+'; Glebov (yellow card) 45+'; Prokhin 73'; Langovich (yellow card) 76'	Report	Kharin (yellow card) 17'; Agalarov 32'; Kamilov (yellow card) 37'; Karapuzov 40' (yellow card) 82'; Semyonov (yellow card) 45+'; Todorović (yellow card) 45+'; Timofeyev (yellow card) 45+' (yellow-red card) 69'; Shvets (yellow card) 58'; Oleynikov (yellow card) 90'	Stadium: Rostov Arena; Attendance: 9,717; Referee: Vitali Meshkov

3 June 2023 30	CSKA Moscow	4 – 1	Rostov	Moscow
17:00 MSK (UTC+3)	Medina 9'; Chalov 16' (pen.), 33'; Willyan 25'	Report	Selyava (yellow card) 15'; Chernov 78'; Silyanov (yellow card) 89'	Stadium: VEB Arena; Attendance: 10,604; Referee: Pavel Kukuyan

=== Russian Cup ===
Pos	Team	Pld	W	PW	PL	L	GF	GA	GD	Pts	Qualification
1	Dynamo Moscow	6	3	0	1	2	9	8	+1	10	Qualification to the Knockout phase (RPL path)
2	Rostov	6	3	0	0	3	12	11	+1	9 (Note: Head-to-head goal difference: Rostov +1, Akhmat -1.)	Qualification to the Knockout phase (RPL path)
3	Akhmat Grozny	6	3	0	0	3	11	12	−1	9	Qualification to the Knockout phase (regions path)
4	Orenburg	6	2	1	0	3	12	13	−1	8	

Source: Russian Football Union (in Russian), Soccerway
Rules for classification: 1) Points; 2) Head-to-head points; 3) Head-to-head matches won; 4) Head-to-head goal difference; 5) Head-to-head goals scored; 6) Matches won; 7) Goal difference; 8) Goals scored; 9) Penalty shoot-out goal difference; 10) Draw.
Notes:

31 August 2022 1	Rostov	2 – 0	Dynamo Moscow	Rostov-on-Don
21:00 MSK (UTC+3)	Golenkov 23' (pen.), 43'; Prokhin (yellow card) 81'	Report	Osokin (yellow card) 24'	Stadium: Rostov Arena; Attendance: 28,913; Referee: Vladimir Moskalyov

14 September 2022 2	Rostov	3 – 1	Orenburg	Rostov-on-Don
17:30 MSK (UTC+3)	Golenkov 52', 85'; Shchetinin 90+5'	Report	Sivakow 88'	Stadium: Rostov Arena; Attendance: 22,115; Referee: Anton Frolov

29 September 2022 3	Akhmat Grozny	3 – 1	Rostov	Grozny
15:00 MSK (UTC+3)	Shvets (yellow card) 27'; Oleynikov 73' (pen.), 79'; Karapuzov (yellow card) 87'; Konaté 88'	Report	Tugarev 59'; Prokhin (yellow card) 72'; Glebov (yellow card) 90+3'	Stadium: Akhmat-Arena; Attendance: 7,008; Referee: Aleksey Amelin

18 October 2022 4	Dynamo Moscow	3 – 1	Rostov	Moscow
20:30 MSK (UTC+3)	Leshchuk (yellow card) 30'; Makarov 44'; Fernández (yellow card) 54'; Skopintsev (yellow card) 59'; Grulyov 79'; Smolov 87'; Fomin (yellow card) 90+2'	Report	Golenkov (yellow card) 30'; Mironov (yellow card) 45'; Poloz 55' (pen.); Komlichenko (yellow card) 70'; Melyokhin (yellow card) 75'	Stadium: VTB Arena; Attendance: 7,134; Referee: Artyom Lyubimov

23 November 2022 5	Orenburg	4 – 2	Rostov	Orenburg
14:00 MSK (UTC+3)	Melyokhin 2' (o.g.); Mansilla 5'; Ayupov (yellow card) 21'; Florentín 37'; Sychevoy (Pisarsky) 66' (pen.); Ektov (yellow card) 83'; Kaplenko (yellow card) 90+2'	Report	Bayramyan 55'; Melnikov 81'	Stadium: Gazovik Stadium; Attendance: 1,802; Referee: Aleksey Sukhoy

27 November 2022 6	Rostov	3 – 0	Akhmat Grozny	Rostov-on-Don
14:00 MSK (UTC+3)	Osipenko (yellow card) 5'; Langovich 17' (yellow card) 63'; Glebov (yellow card) 32'; Komlichenko 42' (yellow card) 44'; Golenkov 86'	Report	Kharin (yellow card) 49'; Semyonov (yellow card) 62'; Timofeyev (yellow card) 72'; Utsiyev (yellow card) 90'	Stadium: Rostov Arena; Attendance: 10,650; Referee: Roman Safyan

==== Knockout stage ====
22 February 2023 RPL path Quarter-finals 1st leg	Rostov	1 – 1	Ural Yekaterinburg	Rostov-on-Don
17:30 MSK (UTC+3)	Komlichenko 67'; Langovich (yellow card) 76'	Report	Kashtanov 6' (pen.); Beveyev (yellow card) 76'	Stadium: Rostov Arena; Attendance: 5,877; Referee: Yevgeniy Kulyak

27 February 2023 RPL path Quarter-finals 2nd leg	Ural Yekaterinburg	2 – 1 (3 – 2 agg.)	Rostov	Yekaterinburg
17:00 MSK (UTC+3)	Beveyev (yellow card) 16'; Yegorychev 27'; Bicfalvi (yellow card) 30'; Sungatulin (yellow card) 62'; Ranđelović (yellow card) 69'; Vloet 88' (pen.)	Report	Golenkov (yellow card) 9'; Osipenko 83' (pen.)	Stadium: Yekaterinburg Arena; Attendance: 9,568; Referee: Vladislav Bezborodov

16 March 2023 Regions path Quarter-finals Stage 2	Pari NN	0 – 1	Rostov	Nizhny Novgorod
18:00 MSK (UTC+3)	Masoero (yellow card) 86'	Report	Glebov (yellow card) 43'; Terentyev (yellow card) 55'; Mironov (yellow card) 57'; Tugarev 82'	Stadium: Nizhny Novgorod Stadium; Attendance: 5,283; Referee: Pavel Shadykhanov

6 April 2023 Regions path Semi-finals Stage 1	Krasnodar	1 – 1 (5 – 3 p)	Rostov	Krasnodar
20:00 MSK (UTC+3)	Spertsyan 24' (yellow card) 69'; Banjac (yellow card) 61'; Kady (yellow card) 73'; Ramírez (yellow card) 78'; Alonso (yellow card) 88'	Report	Selyava (yellow card) 40'; Tugarev 54'; Terentyev (yellow card) 56'; Melyokhin (yellow card) 69'	Stadium: Krasnodar Stadium; Attendance: 25,895; Referee: Vladislav Bezborodov
	Penalties
	Spertsyan (penalty scored); Ionov (penalty scored); Córdoba (penalty scored); Alonso (penalty scored); Krivtsov (penalty scored)		(penalty scored) Bayramyan; (penalty scored) Komlichenko; (penalty missed) Prokhin; (penalty scored) Tugarev

== Squad statistics ==
As of match played 3 June 2023

=== Appearances and goals ===
No.	Pos	Nat	Player	Total		Premier League		Russian Cup	
No.	Pos	Nat	Player	Apps	Goals	Apps	Goals	Apps	Goals
1	GK	(Russia) RUS	Nikita Medvedev	2	0	0	0	2	0
5	DF	(Russia) RUS	Denis Terentyev	21	0	5+11	0	4+1	0
7	FW	(Russia) RUS	Dmitry Poloz	30	9	20+5	8	3+2	1
8	MF	(Russia) RUS	Aleksei Mironov	34	1	14+12	1	5+3	0
15	MF	(Russia) RUS	Danil Glebov	38	4	28	4	8+2	0
18	DF	(Russia) RUS	Danila Prokhin	25	1	11+8	1	5+1	0
19	MF	(Armenia) ARM	Khoren Bayramyan	31	2	20+3	1	6+2	1
23	MF	(Russia) RUS	Roman Tugarev	31	4	17+7	1	6+1	3
26	FW	(North Macedonia) MKD	David Toshevski	2	0	0+2	0	0	0
27	FW	(Russia) RUS	Nikolay Komlichenko	33	12	26	10	2+5	2
28	DF	(Russia) RUS	Yevgeni Chernov	30	2	19+4	2	6+1	0
30	GK	(Russia) RUS	Sergei Pesyakov	38	0	30	0	7+1	0
38	MF	(Belarus) BLR	Aleksandr Selyava	18	1	4+8	1	6	0
45	DF	(Russia) RUS	Aleksandr Silyanov	37	2	29+1	2	5+2	0
47	MF	(Russia) RUS	Daniil Utkin	35	3	22+5	3	6+2	0
55	DF	(Russia) RUS	Maksim Osipenko	33	7	26	6	6+1	1
62	MF	(Russia) RUS	Ivan Komarov	12	0	2+9	0	0+1	0
69	FW	(Russia) RUS	Yegor Golenkov	39	8	5+24	3	8+2	5
71	DF	(Russia) RUS	Nikolai Poyarkov	2	0	0	0	1+1	0
77	MF	(Russia) RUS	Stepan Melnikov	17	2	1+9	1	4+3	1
78	GK	(Russia) RUS	Mikhail Tsulaya	1	0	0	0	1	0
87	DF	(Russia) RUS	Andrei Langovich	31	3	11+11	2	6+3	1
88	MF	(Russia) RUS	Kirill Shchetinin	39	2	20+10	1	5+4	1
92	DF	(Russia) RUS	Viktor Melyokhin	34	0	20+4	0	7+3	0
Players away from the club on loan:
29	DF	(Russia) RUS	Aleksandr Mukhin	1	0	0	0	1	0
89	FW	(Russia) RUS	Artyom Ntumba	7	0	0+7	0	0	0
Players who left Rostov during the season:

=== Goal scorers ===
Place	Position	Nation	Number	Name	Premier League	Russian Cup	Total
1	FW	(Russia)	27	Nikolay Komlichenko	10	2	12
2	FW	(Russia)	7	Dmitry Poloz	8	1	9
3	FW	(Russia)	69	Yegor Golenkov	3	5	8
4	DF	(Russia)	55	Maksim Osipenko	6	1	7
5	MF	(Russia)	15	Danil Glebov	4	0	4
5	MF	(Russia)	23	Roman Tugarev	1	3	4
7	MF	(Russia)	47	Daniil Utkin	3	0	3
7	DF	(Russia)	87	Andrei Langovich	2	1	3
9	DF	(Russia)	28	Yevgeni Chernov	2	0	2
9	DF	(Russia)	45	Aleksandr Silyanov	2	0	2
9	MF	(Armenia)	19	Khoren Bayramyan	1	1	2
9	MF	(Russia)	77	Stepan Melnikov	1	1	2
9	MF	(Russia)	88	Kirill Shchetinin	1	1	2
14	DF	(Russia)	18	Danila Prokhin	1	0	1
14	MF	(Russia)	8	Aleksei Mironov	1	0	1
14	MF	(Belarus)	38	Aleksandr Selyava	1	0	1
14				Own goal	1	0	1
				TOTALS	48	16	64

=== Clean sheets ===
Place	Position	Nation	Number	Name	Premier League	Russian Cup	Total
1	GK	(Russia)	30	Sergei Pesyakov	5	2	7
2	GK	(Russia)	1	Nikita Medvedev	0	1	1
				TOTALS	5	3	8

=== Disciplinary record ===
Number	Nation	Position	Name	Premier League		Russian Cup		Total	
Number	Nation	Position	Name	Booked	Sent off (straight red)	Booked	Sent off (straight red)	Booked	Sent off (straight red)
5	(Russia)	DF	Denis Terentyev	0	0	2	0	2	0
7	(Russia)	FW	Dmitry Poloz	4	0	0	0	4	0
8	(Russia)	MF	Aleksei Mironov	9	0	2	0	11	0
15	(Russia)	MF	Danil Glebov	4	1	3	0	7	1
18	(Russia)	DF	Danila Prokhin	4	1	2	0	6	1
19	(Armenia)	MF	Khoren Bayramyan	5	0	0	0	5	0
23	(Russia)	MF	Roman Tugarev	3	0	0	0	3	0
27	(Russia)	FW	Nikolay Komlichenko	4	0	2	0	6	0
28	(Russia)	DF	Yevgeni Chernov	4	0	0	0	4	0
30	(Russia)	GK	Sergei Pesyakov	3	0	0	0	3	0
38	(Belarus)	MF	Aleksandr Selyava	1	0	1	0	2	0
45	(Russia)	DF	Aleksandr Silyanov	3	0	0	0	3	0
47	(Russia)	MF	Daniil Utkin	4	0	0	0	4	0
55	(Russia)	DF	Maksim Osipenko	2	0	1	0	3	0
62	(Russia)	MF	Ivan Komarov	1	0	0	0	1	0
69	(Russia)	FW	Yegor Golenkov	5	0	2	0	7	0
87	(Russia)	DF	Andrei Langovich	4	0	2	0	6	0
88	(Russia)	MF	Kirill Shchetinin	2	0	0	0	2	0
92	(Russia)	DF	Viktor Melyokhin	6	1	2	0	8	1
Players away on loan:
Players who left Rostov during the season:
			TOTALS	68	3	19	0	87	3
