= Nikolay Komlichenko =

Nikolay Komlichenko may refer to:

- Nikolay Komlichenko (footballer, born 1973), Russian footballer
- Nikolay Komlichenko (footballer, born 1995), Russian footballer
