= Kirill Ushatov =

Russian footballer

Personal information
- Full name: Kirill Andreyevich Ushatov
- Date of birth: 24 January 2000 (age 26)
- Place of birth: Moscow, Russia
- Height: 1.78 m (5 ft 10 in)
- Position: Midfielder

Team information
- Current team: Rodina Moscow
- Number: 23

Youth career
- Strogino Moscow
- Rodina Moscow

Senior career*
Years	Team	Apps	(Gls)
2016	Rodina Moscow (amateur)		
2018–2020	Dolgoprudny	5	(1)
2020–2022	Tver	47	(7)
2022–2024	Sochi	7	(0)
2023	→ Yenisey Krasnoyarsk (loan)	9	(0)
2023–2024	→ Volgar Astrakhan (loan)	29	(0)
2024–2025	Yenisey Krasnoyarsk	26	(2)
2025–	Rodina Moscow	30	(1)
- * Club domestic league appearances and goals as of 22 November 2026

Kirill Andreyevich Ushatov (Russian: Кирилл Андреевич Ушатов; born 24 January 2000) is a Russian football player who plays for Rodina Moscow.

== Club career ==
Ushatov signed with Russian Premier League club Sochi on 26 June 2022. He made his RPL debut for Sochi on 17 July 2022 in a game against Torpedo Moscow.

On 21 February 2023, Ushatov was loaned to Yenisey Krasnoyarsk until the end of the 2022–23 season, with an option to extend the loan.

On 29 June 2023, Ushatov moved to Volgar Astrakhan.

== Career statistics ==
As of 22 November 2026

Club	Season	League			Cup		Other		Total	
Club	Season	Division	Apps	Goals	Apps	Goals	Apps	Goals	Apps	Goals
Dolgoprudny	2017–18	Russian Second League	2	1	—		—		2	1
Dolgoprudny	2018–19	Russian Second League	2	0	0	0	—		2	0
Dolgoprudny	2019–20	Russian Second League	1	0	1	0	—		2	0
Dolgoprudny	Total		5	1	1	0	0	0	6	1
Tver	2020–21	Russian Second League	21	3	1	0	—		22	3
Tver	2021–22	Russian Second League	26	4	1	0	—		27	4
Tver	Total		47	7	2	0	0	0	49	7
Sochi	2022–23	Russian Premier League	7	0	4	0	—		11	0
Sochi	2024–25	Russian First League	0	0	—		—		0	0
Sochi	Total		7	0	4	0	0	0	11	0
Yenisey Krasnoyarsk (loan)	2022–23	Russian First League	9	0	—		2 (Note: Appearances in promotion play-offs)	0	11	0
Volgar Astrakhan (loan)	2023–24	Russian First League	29	0	3	0	—		32	0
Yenisey Krasnoyarsk	2024–25	Russian First League	26	2	0	0	—		26	2
Rodina Moscow	2025–26	Russian First League	21	1	1	0	—		22	1
Rodina Moscow	2026–27	Russian Premier League	9	0	4	0	—		13	0
Rodina Moscow	Total		30	1	5	0	0	0	35	1
Career total			153	11	15	0	2	0	170	11
