= Amir Batyrev =

Canadian soccer player (born 2002)

Personal information
- Full name: Amir Renatovich Batyrev
- Date of birth: 11 March 2002 (age 24)
- Place of birth: Toronto, Ontario, Canada
- Height: 1.75 m (5 ft 9 in)
- Position: Midfielder

Team information
- Current team: Yenisey Krasnoyarsk
- Number: 6

Youth career
- Vaughan SC
- 2014–2018: Toronto FC
- 2018–2021: Vancouver Whitecaps FC

Senior career*
Years	Team	Apps	(Gls)
2021–2022	Tver	10	(2)
2022–2025	Sochi	21	(0)
2024	→ Sokol Saratov (loan)	8	(0)
2024–2025	→ Yenisey Krasnoyarsk (loan)	19	(0)
2025–	Yenisey Krasnoyarsk	24	(0)
- * Club domestic league appearances and goals as of 16 May 2026

Amir Renatovich Batyrev (Russian: Амир Ренатович Батырев; born 11 March 2002) is a Canadian soccer player who plays as a midfielder for Russian First League club Yenisey Krasnoyarsk.

== Early life ==
Batyrev was born in Toronto, Canada to Russian parents who immigrated to Canada from Kalmykia in the 1990s. Batyrev began playing youth soccer at age seven with Vaughan SC. At age 12, he joined the Toronto FC Academy. When he was 15, he went to trial with Portuguese club Estoril Praia, but was unable to sign as a foreign U18 player. He then also trialed with Russian clubs CSKA Moscow, Lokomotiv Moscow, and Spartak Moscow, with the latter two interested in signing him, but he returned to Canada, as his father had to return to work. In September 2018, he joined the Vancouver Whitecaps FC Academy, and in 2021 began playing with the Whitecaps U23 team. He departed the Whitecaps in April 2021.

== Club career ==
After the COVID-19 pandemic interrupted life in Canada, Batyrev headed to Russia to continue playing soccer, with his father sending tapes to clubs. In September 2021, he joined Tver in the Russian Second League. On October 31, 2021, he made his professional debut against Zvezda Saint Petersburg.

In July 2022, Batyrev signed with Russian Premier League club Sochi. Shortly before that, Sochi hired Vadim Garanin as manager, who coached Batyrev at FC Tver previously. He scored his first goal for Sochi on September 14, 2022, in a Russian Cup game against Torpedo Moscow. In his first season with Sochi, he scored one goal, across all competitions.

In February 2024, Batyrev was loaned to Sokol Saratov in the Russian First League for the rest of the 2023–24 season. In August 2024, he was loaned for the 2024–25 season by Russian First League club Yenisey Krasnoyarsk. After making 6 substitute appearances in his first 8 league games with Yenisey, he remained on the bench in all remaining 2024 games. He became a regular for Yenisey in 2025 after the winter break, including several starting line-up appearances.

On September 11, 2025, Batyrev returned to Yenisey Krasnoyarsk on a permanent basis and signed a contract for the 2025–26 season, with an option to extend for the 2026–27 season. He appeared in all 24 games for Yenisey he was eligible for in the 2025–26 league season, 21 of them as a starter.

== International career ==
Batyrev is a dual Canadian and Russian citizen and is eligible to play for both national teams. In November 2016, he was called up to a camp with the Canada U15 national team for the first time.

== Career statistics ==
As of May 16, 2026

Club	Season	League			National cup		Total	
Club	Season	Division	Apps	Goals	Apps	Goals	Apps	Goals
Tver	2021–22	Russian Second League	10	2	0	0	10	2
Sochi	2022–23	Russian Premier League	9	0	3	1	12	1
Sochi	2023–24	Russian Premier League	12	0	6	0	18	0
Sochi	Total		21	0	9	1	30	1
Sokol Saratov (loan)	2023–24	Russian First League	8	0	–		8	0
Yenisey Krasnoyarsk (loan)	2024–25	Russian First League	19	0	0	0	19	0
Yenisey Krasnoyarsk	2025–26	Russian First League	24	0	2	0	26	0
Career total			82	2	11	1	93	3
