= Vasili Slobodko =

Russian footballer

Personal information
- Full name: Vasili Aleksandrovich Slobodko
- Date of birth: 18 June 1973 (age 53)
- Place of birth: Bryansk, Russian SFSR
- Height: 1.94 m (6 ft 4 1/2 in)
- Position: Goalkeeper

Youth career
- Torpedo Bryansk

Senior career*
Years	Team	Apps	(Gls)
1993–1994	FC Dynamo Bryansk	31	(0)
1995–1999	FC Krylia Sovetov Samara	32	(0)
2000	FC Volgar-Gazprom Astrakhan	1	(0)
2001	FC Neftekhimik Nizhnekamsk	15	(0)
2002	FC Luch Vladivostok	26	(0)
2003	FC Dynamo Bryansk	1	(0)
2005	FC Dynamo Bryansk	0	(0)
2005	FC Volga Tver	12	(0)
2008	FC Bezhitsa Bryansk		
2014	FC Bezhitsa Bryansk		
- * Club domestic league appearances and goals

Vasili Aleksandrovich Slobodko (Russian: Василий Александрович Слободько; born 18 June 1973) is a former Russian football player.
