= Ivan Reyzvikh =

Russian footballer

Personal information
- Full name: Ivan Yuryevich Reyzvikh
- Date of birth: 21 December 1981 (age 44)
- Place of birth: Kalinin, Russian SFSR
- Height: 1.73 m (5 ft 8 in)
- Positions: Midfielder; defender

Youth career
- DYuSSh-7 Tver

Senior career*
| Years | Team | Apps | (Gls) |
| 2000 | FC Volga Tver (amateur) | | |
| 2001–2002 | FC Ratmir Tver | | |
| 2003–2005 | FC Volochanin-Ratmir Vyshny Volochyok | 86 | (4) |
| 2006–2007 | FC Volga Tver | 58 | (0) |
| 2008 | FC Metallurg-Kuzbass Novokuznetsk | 37 | (1) |
| 2009–2013 | FC Volga Tver | 123 | (5) |
| 2014 | FC Znamya Truda Orekhovo-Zuyevo | 9 | (0) |
- * Club domestic league appearances and goals

Ivan Yuryevich Reyzvikh (Russian: Иван Юрьевич Рейзвих; born 21 December 1981) is a former Russian professional football player.

== Club career ==
He played in the Russian Football National League for FC Metallurg-Kuzbass Novokuznetsk in 2008.
