= Aleksandr Selyava =

Belarusian footballer (born 1992)

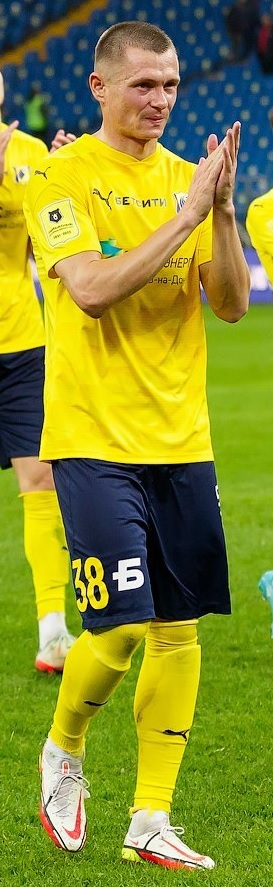
- Selyava with Rostov in 2022

Personal information
- Date of birth: 17 May 1992 (age 34)
- Place of birth: Byalynichy, Mogilev Oblast, Belarus
- Height: 1.80 m (5 ft 11 in)
- Position: Midfielder

Team information
- Current team: Dinamo Minsk
- Number: 8

Youth career
- 2008–2009: BATE Borisov

Senior career*
Years	Team	Apps	(Gls)
2008	BATE Borisov	0	(0)
2010–2011	Klechesk Kletsk	44	(5)
2012–2015	Torpedo-BelAZ Zhodino	73	(4)
2016–2020	Shakhtyor Soligorsk	113	(1)
2021	Dinamo Minsk	27	(0)
2022–2023	Rostov	19	(1)
2023–2024	Dinamo Minsk	38	(3)
2025	Torpedo-BelAZ Zhodino	28	(1)
2026–	Dinamo Minsk	14	(1)

International career^{‡}
2008	Belarus U17	3	(0)
2011	Belarus U19	5	(1)
2012–2014	Belarus U21	6	(0)
2020–	Belarus	21	(0)
- * Club domestic league appearances and goals as of 4 July 2026 ‡ National team caps and goals as of 15 November 2026

Aleksandr Selyava (Belarusian: Аляксандар Сялява; Russian: Александр Селява; born 17 May 1992) is a Belarusian professional footballer. He plays for Dinamo Minsk and for the Belarus national team.

== Club career ==
On 29 December 2021, Selyava signed with Russian Premier League club Rostov until the end of the 2021–22 season with an option to extend. Selyava left Rostov in June 2023.

On 2 July 2023, Selyava returned to Dinamo Minsk.

== Honours ==
Torpedo-BelAZ Zhodino

- Belarusian Cup winner: 2015–16

Shakhtyor Soligorsk

- Belarusian Premier League champion: 2020
- Belarusian Cup winner: 2018–19

== Career statistics ==
=== Club ===
As of match played 3 June 2023

Appearances and goals by club, season and competition
Club	Season	League			Cup		Continental		Other		Total	
Club	Season	Division	Apps	Goals	Apps	Goals	Apps	Goals	Apps	Goals	Apps	Goals
BATE Borisov	2008	Belarusian Premier League	0	0	1	0	0	0	–		1	0
Klechesk Kletsk	2010	Belarusian Second League	20	2	–		–		–		20	2
Klechesk Kletsk	2011	Belarusian First League	24	3	2	0	–		–		26	3
Klechesk Kletsk	Total		44	5	2	0	0	0	0	0	46	5
Torpedo-BelAZ Zhodino	2012	Belarusian Premier League	6	0	1	0	–		2 (Note: Appearances in the relegation play-offs)	0	9	0
Torpedo-BelAZ Zhodino	2013	Belarusian Premier League	29	3	2	0	–		–		31	3
Torpedo-BelAZ Zhodino	2014	Belarusian Premier League	16	1	1	0	–		–		17	1
Torpedo-BelAZ Zhodino	2015	Belarusian Premier League	22	0	2	1	2 (Note: Appearances in the UEFA Europa League)	0	–		26	1
Torpedo-BelAZ Zhodino	Total		73	4	6	1	2	0	2	0	83	5
Shakhtyor Soligorsk	2016	Belarusian Premier League	14	0	2	0	0	0	1 (Note: Appearance in the Belarusian Super Cup)	0	17	0
Shakhtyor Soligorsk	2017	Belarusian Premier League	23	1	3	0	2	0	–		28	1
Shakhtyor Soligorsk	2018	Belarusian Premier League	25	0	1	0	4	0	–		30	0
Shakhtyor Soligorsk	2019	Belarusian Premier League	29	0	6	0	2	0	–		37	0
Shakhtyor Soligorsk	2020	Belarusian Premier League	22	0	6	0	1	0	1	0	30	0
Shakhtyor Soligorsk	Total		113	1	18	0	9	0	2	0	142	1
Dinamo Minsk	2021	Belarusian Premier League	27	0	1	0	–		–		28	0
Rostov	2021–22	Russian Premier League	7	0	–		–		–		7	0
Rostov	2022–23	Russian Premier League	12	1	6	0	–		–		18	1
Rostov	Total		19	1	6	0	0	0	0	0	25	1
Career total			276	11	34	1	11	0	4	0	325	12

=== International ===
As of match played 15 November 2026

Appearances and goals by national team and year
National team	Year	Apps	Goals
Belarus	2020	1	0
Belarus	2021	4	0
Belarus	2022	0	0
Belarus	2023	5	0
Belarus	2024	3	0
Belarus	2025	0	0
Belarus	2026	8	0
Total		21	0
