= Daniil Martovoy =

Russian footballer (born 2003)

Personal information
- Full name: Daniil Igorevich Martovoy
- Date of birth: 20 April 2003 (age 23)
- Place of birth: Krasnodar, Russia
- Height: 1.74 m (5 ft 9 in)
- Position: Midfielder

Team information
- Current team: Shinnik Yaroslavl
- Number: 7

Youth career
- –2020: Sochi

Senior career*
| Years | Team | Apps | (Gls) |
| 2021–2022 | Tver | 27 | (7) |
| 2022–2025 | Sochi | 6 | (2) |
| 2023 | → Rodina Moscow (loan) | 6 | (1) |
| 2023 | → Rodina-2 Moscow (loan) | 2 | (0) |
| 2023–2024 | → Volgar Astrakhan (loan) | 15 | (0) |
| 2025– | Shinnik Yaroslavl | 8 | (0) |
- * Club domestic league appearances and goals as of 16 May 2026

Daniil Igorevich Martovoy (Russian: Даниил Игоревич Мартовой; born 20 April 2003) is a Russian footballer who plays as a midfielder for Shinnik Yaroslavl.

== Career ==
On 26 June 2022, Martovoy returned to his youth club Sochi after 1.5 years away. He made his debut in the Russian Premier League for Sochi on 26 August 2022 against FC Khimki.

On 21 February 2023, Martovoy moved to Rodina Moscow on a year-long loan with an option to buy. On 23 June 2023, he moved on a new season-long loan at Volgar Astrakhan.

== Career statistics ==
As of 31 May 2025

| Club | Season | League | | | Cup | | Continental | | Other | | Total | |
| Club | Season | Division | Apps | Goals | Apps | Goals | Apps | Goals | Apps | Goals | Apps | Goals |
|---|---|---|---|---|---|---|---|---|---|---|---|---|
| Tver | 2021–22 | Russian Second League | 27 | 7 | 1 | 0 | – | | – | | 28 | 7 |
| Sochi | 2022–23 | Russian Premier League | 1 | 0 | 2 | 0 | – | | – | | 3 | 0 |
| Sochi | 2024–25 | Russian First League | 5 | 2 | 0 | 0 | – | | 1 (Note: Appearance in promotion play-offs) | 0 | 6 | 2 |
| Sochi | Total | | 6 | 2 | 2 | 0 | 0 | 0 | 1 | 0 | 9 | 2 |
| Rodina Moscow (loan) | 2022–23 | Russian First League | 6 | 1 | 0 | 0 | – | | 0 | 0 | 6 | 1 |
| Rodina-2 Moscow (loan) | 2022–23 | Russian Second League | 2 | 0 | – | | – | | – | | 2 | 0 |
| Volgar Astrakhan (loan) | 2023–24 | Russian First League | 15 | 0 | 3 | 0 | – | | – | | 18 | 0 |
| Career total | | | 56 | 10 | 6 | 0 | 0 | 0 | 1 | 0 | 63 | 10 |
