= Dmitri Poloz =

Russian footballer (born 1991)

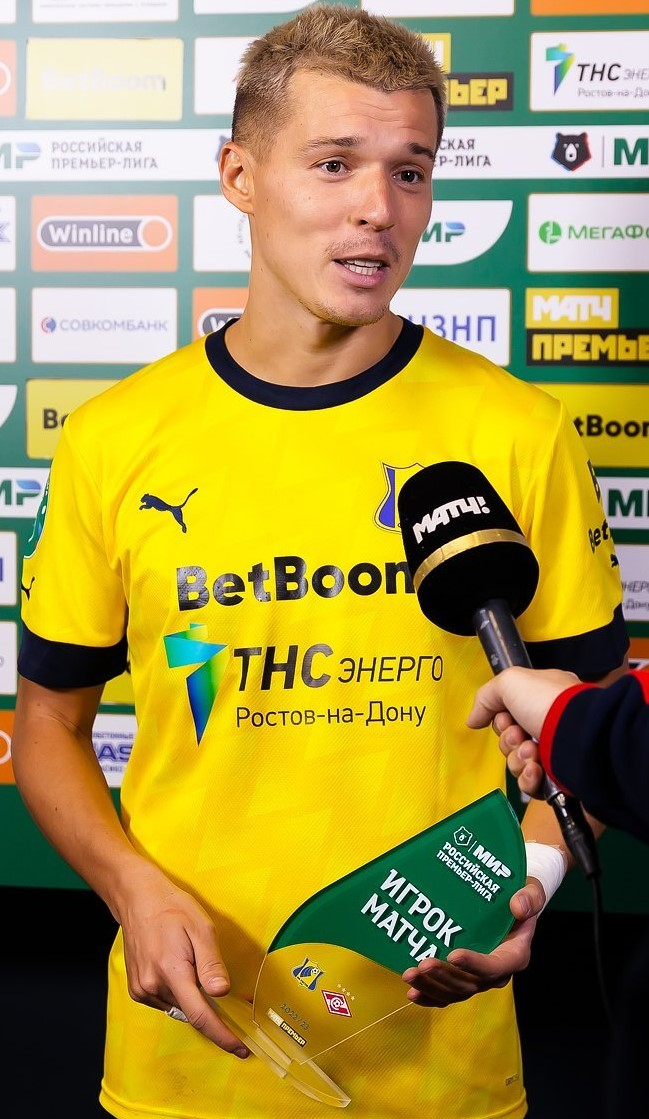
- Poloz with Rostov in 2022

Personal information
- Full name: Dmitri Dmitriyevich Poloz
- Date of birth: 12 July 1991 (age 35)
- Place of birth: Stavropol, Soviet Union
- Height: 1.82 m (6 ft 0 in)
- Position: Forward

Youth career
- 1998–2004: Dynamo Stavropol
- 2005–2009: Lokomotiv Moscow

Senior career*
Years	Team	Apps	(Gls)
2009–2011	Lokomotiv Moscow	0	(0)
2012–2017	Rostov	127	(22)
2017–2019	Zenit St.Petersburg	19	(1)
2018–2019	→ Rubin Kazan (loan)	27	(5)
2019–2020	Sochi	27	(6)
2020–2023	Rostov	78	(28)
2023–2024	Torpedo Moscow	20	(0)
2024	Krasnoye Znamya Noginsk (amateur)		
Total		298	(62)

International career
2009	Russia U-19	2	(1)
2011	Russia U-21	1	(0)
2012	Russia-2	1	(0)
2014–2018	Russia	19	(3)
- * Club domestic league appearances and goals

Dmitri Dmitriyevich Poloz (Russian: Дми́трий Дми́триевич По́лоз; born 12 July 1991) is a Russian former professional footballer who played as a winger or second striker.

== Club career ==
Poloz was born in Stavropol. He began to play football for his hometown club Dynamo Stavropol and joined the youth ranks of Lokomotiv Moscow in 2008. On 15 July 2009, he made his professional debut for Lokomotiv Moscow in a 1–2 away loss to SKA-Energiya Khabarovsk in the Russian Cup.

=== Rostov ===
On 10 January 2012, Poloz signed a three-year contract with Russian Premier League club Rostov. On 17 March 2012, he made his debut for a new club in a league game against Terek Grozny. On 7 December 2012, he scored his first league goal in a 2–3 home loss to Krasnodar.

=== Zenit St Petersburg ===
On 28 June 2017, Poloz signed a three-year contract with FC Zenit Saint Petersburg.

==== Loan to Rubin Kazan ====
On 26 July 2018, he joined FC Rubin Kazan on loan for the 2018–19 season.

=== Sochi ===
On 4 July 2019, he moved to PFC Sochi.

=== Return to Rostov ===
On 23 August 2020, he returned to FC Rostov in exchange for Ivelin Popov. On 28 November 2020, he scored the first hat-trick of his career in a 4–1 victory over FC Dynamo Moscow, two of his goals were from the penalty spot. Poloz left Rostov in June 2023.

== International career ==
On 3 September 2014, Poloz made his national team debut in a friendly against Azerbaijan.

On 11 May 2018, he was included in Russia's extended 2018 FIFA World Cup squad as a back-up. He was not included in the finalized World Cup squad.

== Career statistics ==
=== Club ===
As of end of 2022–23 season

Appearances and goals by club, season and competition
Club	Season	League			Russian Cup		Continental		Other		Total	
Club	Season	Division	Apps	Goals	Apps	Goals	Apps	Goals	Apps	Goals	Apps	Goals
Lokomotiv Moscow	2009	Russian Premier League	0	0	1	0	–		–		1	0
Lokomotiv Moscow	2011–12	Russian Premier League	0	0	0	0	0	0	–		0	0
Lokomotiv Moscow	Total		0	0	1	0	0	0	0	0	1	0
Rostov	2011–12	Russian Premier League	7	0	1	0	–		2 (Note: Appearances in the relegation play-offs)	0	10	0
Rostov	2012–13	Russian Premier League	17	3	3	0	–		2	0	22	3
Rostov	2013–14	Russian Premier League	27	1	3	0	–		–		30	1
Rostov	2014–15	Russian Premier League	20	4	1	0	2 (Note: Appearances in the UEFA Europa League)	0	1 (Note: Appearances in the Russian Super Cup)	0	24	4
Rostov	2015–16	Russian Premier League	30	7	0	0	–		–		30	7
Rostov	2016–17	Russian Premier League	26	7	0	0	14 (Note: Ten appearances, five goals in the UEFA Champions League, four appearances, two goals in the UEFA Europa League)	7	–		40	14
Rostov	Total		127	22	11	0	16	7	5	0	156	29
Zenit St. Petersburg	2017–18	Russian Premier League	19	1	1	1	11	1	–		31	3
Rubin Kazan	2018–19	Russian Premier League	27	5	3	0	–		–		30	5
Sochi	2019–20	Russian Premier League	24	5	1	0	–		–		25	5
Sochi	2020–21	Russian Premier League	3	1	–		–		–		3	1
Sochi	Total		27	6	1	0	0	0	0	0	28	6
Rostov	2020–21	Russian Premier League	26	6	1	0	1	0	–		28	6
Rostov	2021–22	Russian Premier League	27	14	1	0	–		–		28	14
Rostov	2022–23	Russian Premier League	25	8	4	1	–		–		29	9
Rostov	Total		78	28	6	1	1	0	0	0	85	29
Career total			278	62	20	2	28	8	5	0	333	72

=== International ===
As of 20 November 2018.

Russia
Year	Apps	Goals
2014	2	0
2015	0	0
2016	4	0
2017	9	2
2018	4	1
Total	19	3

=== International goals ===
Scores and results list Russia's goal tally first.

No.	Date	Venue	Opponent	Score	Result	Competition
1.	5 June 2017	Groupama Arena, Budapest, Hungary	Hungary	3–0	3–0	Friendly
2.	10 October 2017	Kazan Arena, Kazan, Russia	Iran	1–1	1–1	Friendly
3.	10 September 2018	Rostov Arena, Rostov-on-Don, Russia	Czech Republic	5–1	5–1	Friendly

== Honours ==
Rostov

- Russian Cup: 2013–14
