= Aleksandr Mukhin =

Russian footballer (born 2002)

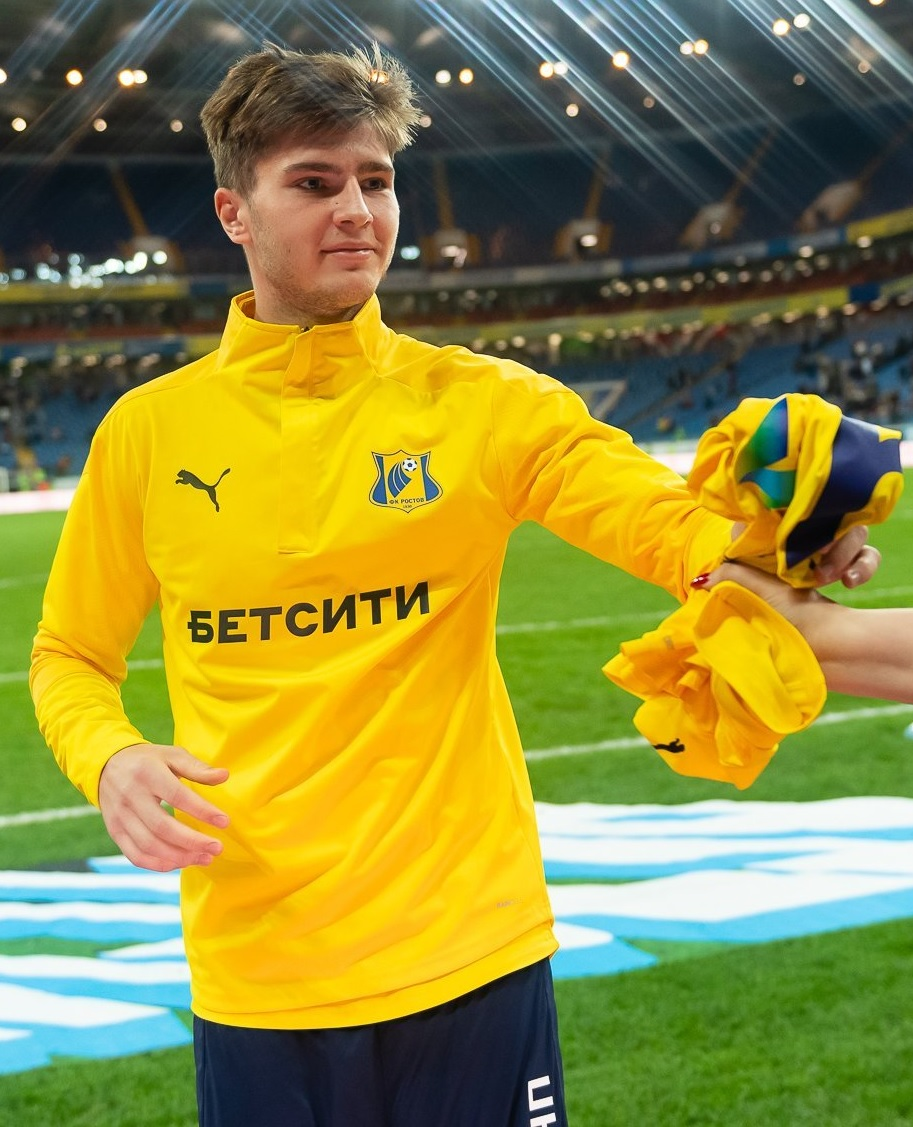
- Mukhin with Rostov in 2022

Personal information
- Full name: Aleksandr Olegovich Mukhin
- Date of birth: 28 April 2002 (age 24)
- Place of birth: Serpukhov, Russia
- Height: 1.85 m (6 ft 1 in)
- Position: Centre-back

Team information
- Current team: FC SKA-Khabarovsk
- Number: 29

Youth career
- DYuSSh-80 Serpukhov
- –2021: FC Lokomotiv Moscow
- 2021: FC Rostov

Senior career*
Years	Team	Apps	(Gls)
2020	FC Kazanka Moscow	9	(1)
2021–2026	FC Rostov	6	(0)
2023	→ FC Ufa (loan)	13	(1)
2023	→ FC Volgar Astrakhan (loan)	0	(0)
2025	→ FC Rostov-2	9	(0)
2025–2026	→ FC SKA-Khabarovsk (loan)	8	(0)
2026–	FC SKA-Khabarovsk	0	(0)

International career^{‡}
2017	Russia U15	5	(0)
2017	Russia U16	9	(0)
2019	Russia U17	5	(0)
2019	Russia U18	2	(0)
- * Club domestic league appearances and goals as of 16 May 2026 ‡ National team caps and goals as of 16 November 2019

Aleksandr Olegovich Mukhin (Russian: Александр Олегович Мухин; born 29 April 2002) is a Russian football player who plays for FC SKA-Khabarovsk.

== Club career ==
He was raised in the FC Lokomotiv Moscow academy and represented the club in the 2019–20 UEFA Youth League.

He made his debut for the main squad of FC Rostov on 27 October 2021 in a Russian Cup game against FC Torpedo Moscow. He made his Russian Premier League debut for Rostov on 14 March 2022 against FC Rubin Kazan, becoming the first ever sixth substitute in a league game, after regular 5 substitutions were made and another player had to leave the game due to a suspected head injury.

On 13 December 2022, Mukhin extended his contract with Rostov until 2026.

On 2 February 2023, Mukhin was loaned by FC Ufa in the Russian First League. On 4 July 2023, Mukhin moved on a new loan to FC Volgar Astrakhan. On 11 September 2025, Mukhin joined FC SKA-Khabarovsk on loan.

On 26 June 2026, Mukhin moved to FC SKA-Khabarovsk on a permanent basis and signed a two-year contract.

== International career ==
He represented Russia at the 2019 UEFA European Under-17 Championship, Russia did not advance from the group stage.

== Career statistics ==
As of 29 September 2022

Club	Season	League			Cup		Continental		Total	
Club	Season	Division	Apps	Goals	Apps	Goals	Apps	Goals	Apps	Goals
Kazanka Moscow	2020–21	PFL	9	1	–		–		9	1
Rostov	2020–21	RPL	0	0	0	0	–		0	0
Rostov	2021–22	RPL	6	0	1	0	–		7	0
Rostov	2022–23	RPL	0	0	1	0	–		1	0
Rostov	Total		6	0	2	0	0	0	8	0
Career total			15	1	2	0	0	0	17	1
