= Stepan Melnikov =

Russian footballer (born 2002)

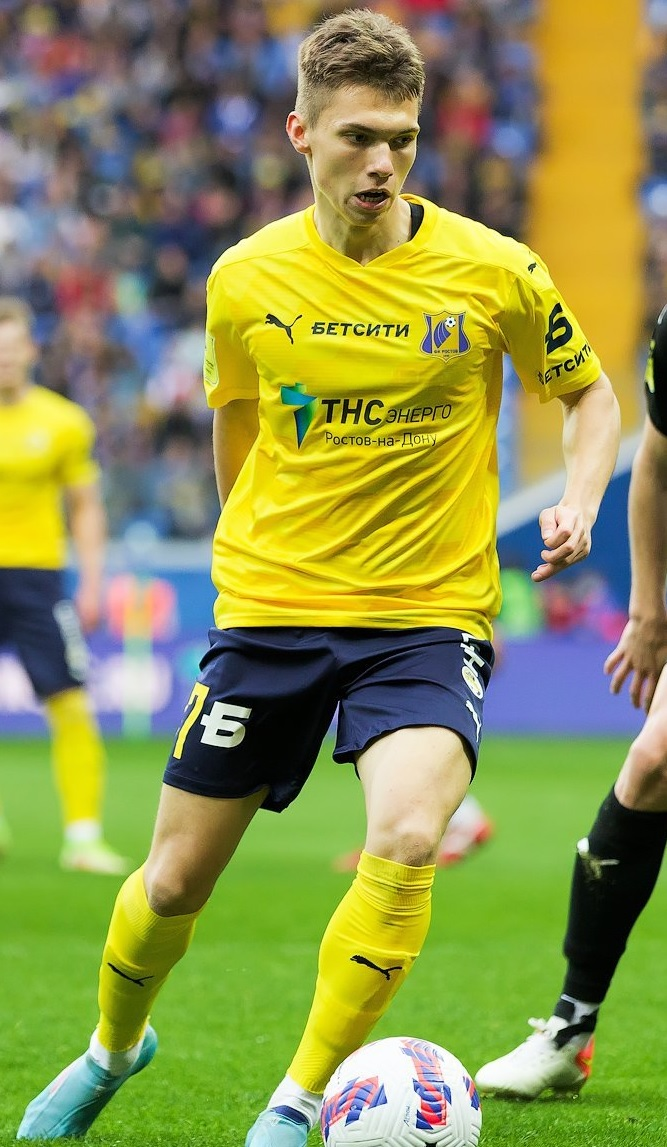
- Melnikov with Rostov in 2022

Personal information
- Full name: Stepan Kirillovich Melnikov
- Date of birth: 25 April 2002 (age 24)
- Place of birth: Moscow, Russia
- Height: 1.81 m (5 ft 11 in)
- Position: Midfielder

Youth career
- Spartak Moscow

Senior career*
Years	Team	Apps	(Gls)
2021	Spartak-2 Moscow	35	(6)
2021	Spartak Moscow	1	(0)
2022–2024	Rostov	16	(1)
2023–2024	→ Alania Vladikavkaz (loan)	10	(0)

International career^{‡}
2017	Russia U15	5	(1)
2018	Russia U16	5	(0)
2018–2019	Russia U17	6	(0)
- * Club domestic league appearances and goals as of 25 May 2024 ‡ National team caps and goals as of 7 May 2019

Stepan Kirillovich Melnikov (Russian: Степан Кириллович Мельников; born 25 April 2002) is a Russian football player.

== Club career ==
He made his debut in the Russian Football National League for Spartak-2 Moscow on 6 March 2021 in a game against Baltika Kaliningrad.

He made his Russian Premier League debut for Spartak on 29 November 2021 in a game against Ufa.

On 20 January 2022, he signed a 4.5-year contract with Rostov.

On 22 June 2023, Melnikov moved on a season-long loan to Alania Vladikavkaz.

== International career ==
He represented Russia at the 2019 UEFA European Under-17 Championship. He appeared in two games as Russia was eliminated at group stage.

== Career statistics ==
As of 25 May 2024

Club	Season	League			Cup		Continental		Total	
Club	Season	Division	Apps	Goals	Apps	Goals	Apps	Goals	Apps	Goals
Spartak-2 Moscow	2020–21	Russian First League	14	3	–		–		14	3
Spartak-2 Moscow	2021–22	Russian First League	21	3	–		–		21	3
Spartak-2 Moscow	Total		35	6	0	0	0	0	35	6
Spartak Moscow	2021–22	Russian Premier League	1	0	0	0	0	0	1	0
Rostov	2021–22	Russian Premier League	6	0	–		–		6	0
Rostov	2022–23	Russian Premier League	10	1	7	1	–		17	2
Rostov	Total		16	1	7	1	0	0	23	2
Alania Vladikavkaz (loan)	2023–24	Russian First League	10	0	1	0	–		11	0
Career total			62	7	8	1	0	0	70	8
