= Yevgeni Chernov =

Russian footballer (born 1992)

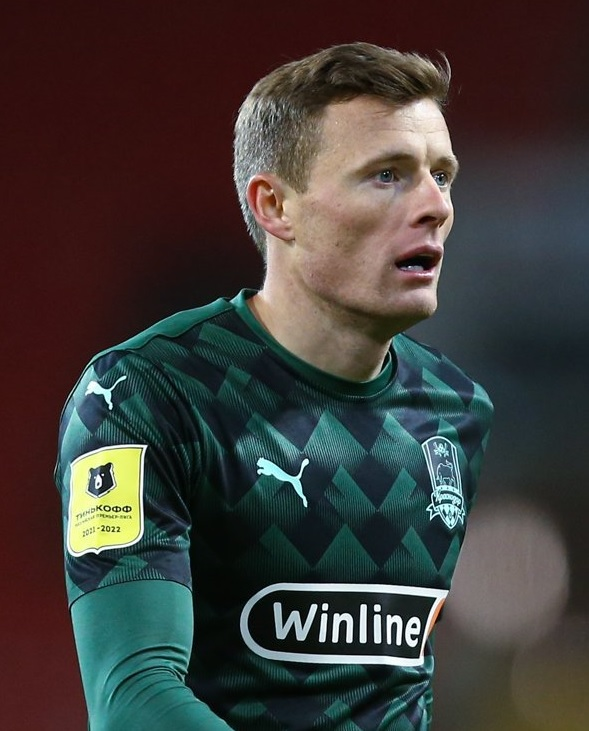
- Chernov with Krasnodar in 2022

Personal information
- Full name: Yevgeni Aleksandrovich Chernov
- Date of birth: 23 October 1992 (age 34)
- Place of birth: Tomsk, Russia
- Height: 1.80 m (5 ft 11 in)
- Position: Left-back

Youth career
- –2012: Tom Tomsk

Senior career*
Years	Team	Apps	(Gls)
2012–2015	Tom Tomsk	1	(0)
2012–2013	→ Gazovik Orenburg (loan)	19	(4)
2013–2015	→ Khimik Dzerzhinsk (loan)	58	(1)
2015	→ Yenisey Krasnoyarsk (loan)	18	(0)
2016–2018	Zenit Saint Petersburg	11	(0)
2016–2017	Zenit-2 Saint Petersburg	38	(1)
2017–2018	→ Tosno (loan)	25	(0)
2019–2020	Rostov	50	(1)
2020–2023	Krasnodar	28	(0)
2022–2023	→ Rostov (loan)	23	(2)
2023–2026	Rostov	28	(0)
2025	→ Baltika Kaliningrad (loan)	10	(1)

International career
2010	Russia U-18	6	(0)
2011	Russia U-19	1	(0)
- * Club domestic league appearances and goals as of 24 May 2025

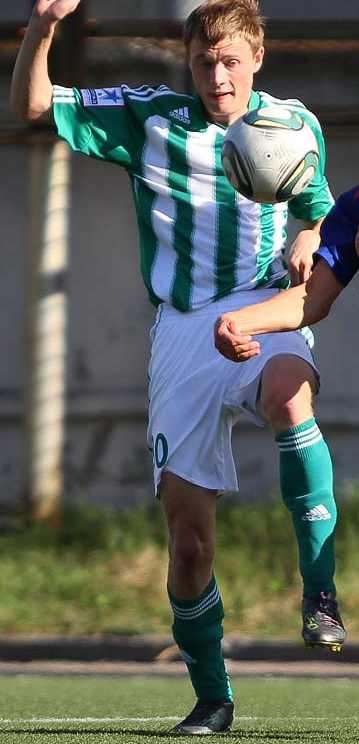
Yevgeni Chernov in 2011

Yevgeni Aleksandrovich Chernov (Russian: Евгений Александрович Чернов; born 23 October 1992) is a Russian football player who plays as a left-back.

== Club career ==
He made his Russian Premier League debut for Tom Tomsk on 27 April 2012 in a game against Amkar Perm.

He made his debut for Zenit St. Petersburg on 22 September 2016 in a Russian Cup game against Tambov.

He played as Tosno won the 2017–18 Russian Cup final against Avangard Kursk on 9 May 2018 in the Volgograd Arena.

On 10 February 2019, he signed a 3.5-year contract with Rostov.

On 6 October 2020, he moved to Krasnodar and signed a four-year contract. On 10 July 2022, Chernov returned to Rostov on a season-long loan.

On 20 June 2023, Chernov moved to Rostov on a permanent basis and signed a three-year deal. On 22 January 2025, Chernov was loaned to Baltika Kaliningrad.

== International career ==
He was called up to the senior Russia squad for a friendly against Iran in October 2017. After a break, he was called up again for UEFA Euro 2020 qualifying matches against San Marino and Cyprus in June 2019.

== Career statistics ==
As of match played 24 May 2025

Appearances and goals by club, season and competition
Club	Season	League			Cup		Continental		Total	
Club	Season	Division	Apps	Goals	Apps	Goals	Apps	Goals	Apps	Goals
Tom Tomsk	2011–12	Russian Premier League	1	0	0	0	—		1	0
Tom Tomsk	2012–13	Russian First League	0	0	—		—		0	0
Tom Tomsk	Total		1	0	0	0	0	0	1	0
Gazovik Orenburg (loan)	2012–13	Russian Second League	19	4	2	0	—		21	4
Khimik Dzerzhinsk (loan)	2013–14	Russian First League	26	0	0	0	—		26	0
Khimik Dzerzhinsk (loan)	2014–15	Russian First League	32	1	2	0	—		34	1
Khimik Dzerzhinsk (loan)	Total		58	1	2	0	0	0	60	1
Yenisey Krasnoyarsk (loan)	2015–16	Russian First League	18	0	2	0	—		20	0
Zenit-2 St. Petersburg	2015–16	Russian First League	13	0	—		—		13	0
Zenit-2 St. Petersburg	2016–17	Russian First League	25	1	—		—		25	1
Zenit-2 St. Petersburg	Total		38	1	0	0	0	0	38	1
Zenit St. Petersburg	2015–16	Russian Premier League	0	0	0	0	0	0	0	0
Zenit St. Petersburg	2016–17	Russian Premier League	6	0	1	0	0	0	7	0
Zenit St. Petersburg	2018–19	Russian Premier League	5	0	1	0	0	0	6	0
Zenit St. Petersburg	Total		11	0	2	0	0	0	13	0
Tosno (loan)	2017–18	Russian Premier League	25	0	4	0	—		29	0
Rostov	2018–19	Russian Premier League	12	0	3	0	—		15	0
Rostov	2019–20	Russian Premier League	29	0	0	0	—		29	0
Rostov	2020–21	Russian Premier League	9	1	—		1 (Note: Appearance in UEFA Europa League)	0	10	1
Rostov	Total		50	1	3	0	1	0	54	1
Krasnodar	2020–21	Russian Premier League	18	0	1	0	7 (Note: Five appearances in UEFA Champions League, two appearances in UEFA Europa League)	0	26	0
Krasnodar	2021–22	Russian Premier League	10	0	0	0	—		10	0
Krasnodar	Total		28	0	1	0	7	0	36	0
Rostov (loan)	2022–23	Russian Premier League	23	2	7	0	—		30	2
Rostov	2023–24	Russian Premier League	23	0	4	0	—		27	0
Rostov	2024–25	Russian Premier League	5	0	4	0	—		9	0
Rostov	2025–26	Russian Premier League	0	0	0	0	—		0	0
Rostov	Total		28	0	8	0	—		36	0
Baltika Kaliningrad (loan)	2024–25	Russian First League	10	1	0	0	—		10	1
Career total			309	10	31	0	8	0	348	10

== Honours ==
Tosno

- Russian Cup: 2017–18

Zenit Saint Petersburg

- Russian Premier League: 2018–19
