= Nikolay Komlichenko (footballer, born 1973) =

Russian footballer

Personal information
- Full name: Nikolay Anatolyevich Komlichenko
- Date of birth: 24 March 1973 (age 53)
- Place of birth: Plastunovskaya, Krasnodar Krai, Russian SFSR
- Height: 1.86 m (6 ft 1 in)
- Positions: Midfielder; forward

Senior career*
| Years | Team | Apps | (Gls) |
| 1992–1994 | FC Niva Slavyansk-na-Kubani | 83 | (32) |
| 1995–2000 | FC Druzhba Maykop | 215 | (50) |
| 2001 | FC Kuban Krasnodar | 23 | (3) |
| 2002 | FC Baltika Kaliningrad | 11 | (0) |
| 2002 | FC Druzhba Maykop | 16 | (5) |
| 2003 | FC Neftekhimik Nizhnekamsk | 4 | (0) |
| 2003 | FC Spartak Anapa | 14 | (0) |
| 2004 | FC Semey | 13 | (2) |
| 2004–2012 | FC GNS-Spartak Krasnodar | | |
- * Club domestic league appearances and goals

Nikolay Anatolyevich Komlichenko (Russian: Николай Анатольевич Комличенко; born 24 March 1973) is a former Russian professional football player.

== Club career ==
He played 6 seasons in the Russian Football National League for FC Druzhba Maykop, FC Kuban Krasnodar and FC Neftekhimik Nizhnekamsk.

== Honours ==
- Russian Third League Zone 1 top scorer: 1994 (22 goals).

== Personal life ==
His son, also called Nikolay, is a professional footballer as well.
