= Denis Osokin =

Russian footballer (born 2002)

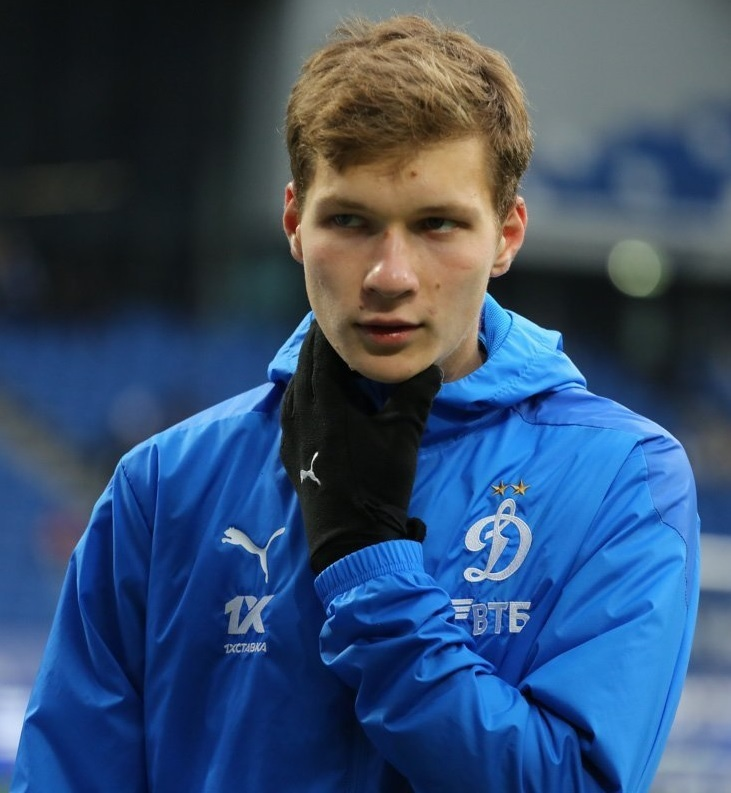
- Osokin with Dynamo Moscow in 2022

Personal information
- Full name: Denis Andreyevich Osokin
- Date of birth: 14 November 2002 (age 24)
- Place of birth: Krasnogorsk, Russia
- Height: 1.87 m (6 ft 2 in)
- Position: Centre-back

Team information
- Current team: Dynamo Bryansk
- Number: 4

Youth career
- Dynamo Moscow

Senior career*
Years	Team	Apps	(Gls)
2021–2023	Dynamo-2 Moscow	36	(1)
2022–2023	Dynamo Moscow	0	(0)
2023–2024	Dynamo Makhachkala	0	(0)
2023–2024	Dynamo-2 Makhachkala	7	(0)
2024–2025	Dynamo St. Petersburg	28	(1)
2025–	Dynamo Bryansk	56	(3)
- * Club domestic league appearances and goals as of 15 November 2026

Denis Andreyevich Osokin (Russian: Денис Андреевич Осокин; born 14 November 2002) is a Russian footballer who plays as a centre-back for Dynamo Bryansk.

== Career ==
Osokin made his debut for Dynamo Moscow on 31 August 2022 in a Russian Cup game against Rostov.

== Career statistics ==
As of 27 November 2022

Appearances and goals by club, season and competition
Club	Season	League			Cup		Continental		Total	
Club	Season	Division	Apps	Goals	Apps	Goals	Apps	Goals	Apps	Goals
Dynamo-2 Moscow	2020–21	Second League	7	0	–		–		7	0
Dynamo-2 Moscow	2021–22	Second League	19	1	–		–		19	1
Dynamo-2 Moscow	2022–23	Second League	7	0	–		–		7	0
Dynamo-2 Moscow	Total		33	1	0	0	0	0	33	1
Dynamo Moscow	2021–22	RPL	0	0	0	0	–		0	0
Dynamo Moscow	2022–23	RPL	0	0	1	0	–		1	0
Dynamo Moscow	Total		0	0	1	0	0	0	1	0
Career total			33	1	1	0	0	0	34	1
