= Mingiyan Beveyev =

Russian footballer (born 1995)

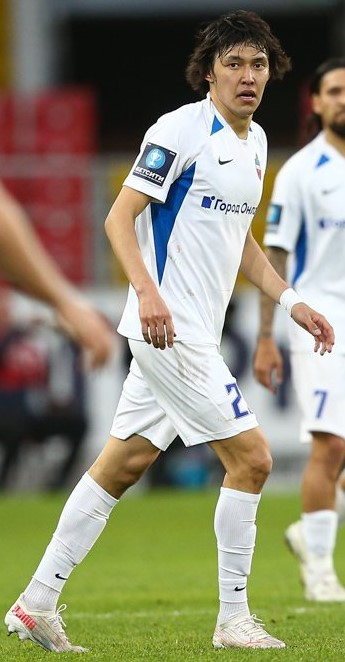
- Beveyev with Yenisey in 2022

Personal information
- Full name: Mingiyan Valeryevich Beveyev
- Date of birth: 30 November 1995 (age 30)
- Place of birth: Verkhny Yashkul, Republic of Kalmykia, Russia
- Height: 1.82 m (6 ft 0 in)
- Position: Right-back

Team information
- Current team: Baltika Kaliningrad
- Number: 22

Youth career
- Uralan Elista

Senior career*
Years	Team	Apps	(Gls)
2015–2017	Volgar Astrakhan	0	(0)
2015–2016	→ MITOS Novocherkassk (loan)	22	(8)
2017	Nosta Novotroitsk	23	(4)
2017–2020	Ural Yekaterinburg	0	(0)
2017–2019	→ Ural-2 Yekaterinburg	31	(3)
2020–2022	KAMAZ Naberezhnye Chelny	46	(3)
2022	Yenisey Krasnoyarsk	11	(0)
2022–2025	Ural Yekaterinburg	68	(3)
2025–	Baltika Kaliningrad	43	(2)

International career^{‡}
2025–	Russia	14	(1)
- * Club domestic league appearances and goals as of 21 November 2026 ‡ National team caps and goals as of 17 November 2026

Mingiyan Valeryevich Beveyev (Russian: Мингиян Валерьевич Бевеев; born 30 November 1995) is a Russian football player who plays for Baltika Kaliningrad and the Russia national team.

== Club career ==
Beveyev made his debut in the Russian Professional Football League for FC MITOS Novocherkassk on 28 July 2015 in a game against Mashuk-KMV Pyatigorsk.

He made his debut for Ural Yekaterinburg on 25 September 2018 in a Russian Cup game against Neftekhimik Nizhnekamsk, as a starter.

On 2 June 2022, Beveyev returned to Ural Yekaterinburg after two seasons away. He made his Russian Premier League debut for Ural on 23 July 2022 against Orenburg.

On 15 June 2025, Beveyev signed a two-year contract with Baltika Kaliningrad. On 10 June 2026, he extended his Baltika contract until 10 June 2028.

== International career ==
Beveyev was first called up to the Russia national team in October 2025 for friendlies. He made his debut on 10 October 2025 in a friendly against Iran. He became the first player from Kalmykia to play for Russia's national team.

On 9 June 2026, he scored first opening goal in a victory 3–0 against Trinidad and Tobago.

== Personal life ==
Beveyev is an ethnic Kalmyk.

== Career statistics ==
=== Club ===
As of 21 November 2026

Club	Season	League			Cup		Other		Total	
Club	Season	Division	Apps	Goals	Apps	Goals	Apps	Goals	Apps	Goals
Volgar Astrakhan	2014–15	Russian First League	0	0	0	0	1 (Note: Appearances in the FNL Cup)	0	1	0
Volgar Astrakhan	2016–17	Russian First League	0	0	1	0	1	0	2	0
Volgar Astrakhan	Total		0	0	1	0	2	0	3	0
MITOS Novocherkassk (loan)	2015–16	Russian Second League	22	8	0	0	—		22	8
Nosta Novotroitsk	2016–17	Russian Second League	8	2	—		—		8	2
Nosta Novotroitsk	2017–18	Russian Second League	15	2	1	0	—		16	2
Nosta Novotroitsk	Total		23	4	1	0	0	0	24	4
Ural Yekaterinburg	2017–18	Russian Premier League	0	0	—		2	0	2	0
Ural Yekaterinburg	2018–19	Russian Premier League	0	0	1	0	1	0	2	0
Ural Yekaterinburg	Total		0	0	1	0	3	0	4	0
Ural-2 Yekaterinburg	2017–18	Russian Second League	1	0	—		—		1	0
Ural-2 Yekaterinburg	2018–19	Russian Second League	16	0	—		—		16	0
Ural-2 Yekaterinburg	2019–20	Russian Second League	14	3	—		—		14	3
Ural-2 Yekaterinburg	Total		31	3	0	0	0	0	31	3
Rotor Volgograd (loan)	2018–19	Russian First League	—		—		2	0	2	0
KAMAZ	2020–21	Russian Second League	22	2	2	0	—		24	2
KAMAZ	2021–22	Russian First League	24	1	2	0	—		26	1
KAMAZ	Total		46	3	4	0	0	0	50	3
Yenisey Krasnoyarsk	2021–22	Russian First League	11	0	3	0	—		14	0
Ural Yekaterinburg	2022–23	Russian Premier League	25	0	10	0	—		35	0
Ural Yekaterinburg	2023–24	Russian Premier League	18	0	8	0	0	0	26	0
Ural Yekaterinburg	2024–25	Russian First League	25	3	4	1	2 (Note: Appearances in promotion play-offs)	0	31	4
Ural Yekaterinburg	Total		68	3	22	1	2	0	92	4
Baltika Kaliningrad	2025–26	Russian Premier League	28	2	5	0	—		33	2
Baltika Kaliningrad	2026–27	Russian Premier League	15	0	4	0	—		19	0
Baltika Kaliningrad	Total		43	2	9	0	0	0	52	2
Career total			244	23	41	1	9	0	294	24

=== International ===
As of match played 17 November 2026

Appearances and goals by national team and year
National team	Year	Apps	Goals
Russia	2025	4	0
Russia	2026	10	1
Total		14	1

==== International goals ====
Scores and results list Russia's goal tally first.

No.	Date	Venue	Opponent	Score	Result	Competition
1	9 June 2026	Kaliningrad Stadium, Kaliningrad, Russia	Trinidad and Tobago	1–0	3–0	Friendly
