= Mikhail Tsulaya =

Russian footballer (born 2005)

Personal information
- Full name: Mikhail Datoyevich Tsulaya
- Date of birth: 8 February 2005 (age 21)
- Place of birth: Rostov-on-Don, Russia
- Height: 1.90 m (6 ft 3 in)
- Position: Goalkeeper

Team information
- Current team: Arsenal Tula/ Arsenal-2 Tula
- Number: 18

Youth career
- Rostov

Senior career*
Years	Team	Apps	(Gls)
2022–2025	Rostov	0	(0)
2024–2025	Rostov-2	27	(0)
2025–	Arsenal Tula	40	(0)
2026–	Arsenal-2 Tula	3	(0)

International career^{‡}
2022	Russia U18	2	(0)
2023	Russia U19	2	(0)
2023–2025	Russia U21	3	(0)
- * Club domestic league appearances and goals as of 16 May 2026 ‡ National team caps and goals as of 5 June 2025

Mikhail Datoyevich Tsulaya (Russian: Михаил Датоевич Цулая; born 8 February 2005) is a Russian footballer who plays as a goalkeeper for Arsenal Tula and Arsenal-2 Tula.

== Club career ==
Tsulaya made his debut for Rostov on 23 November 2022 in a Russian Cup game against Orenburg.

On 14 January 2025, Tsulaya moved to Arsenal Tula.

== Career statistics ==
As of 16 November 2024

Appearances and goals by club, season and competition
Club	Season	League			Cup		Continental		Total	
Club	Season	Division	Apps	Goals	Apps	Goals	Apps	Goals	Apps	Goals
Rostov	2022–23	Russian Premier League	0	0	1	0	–		1	0
Rostov	2023–24	Russian Premier League	0	0	0	0	–		0	0
Rostov	Total		0	0	1	0	0	0	1	0
Rostov-2	2024	Russian Second League B	27	0	–		–		27	0
Career total			27	0	1	0	0	0	28	0
