= Vadim Garanin =

Russian footballer (born 1970)

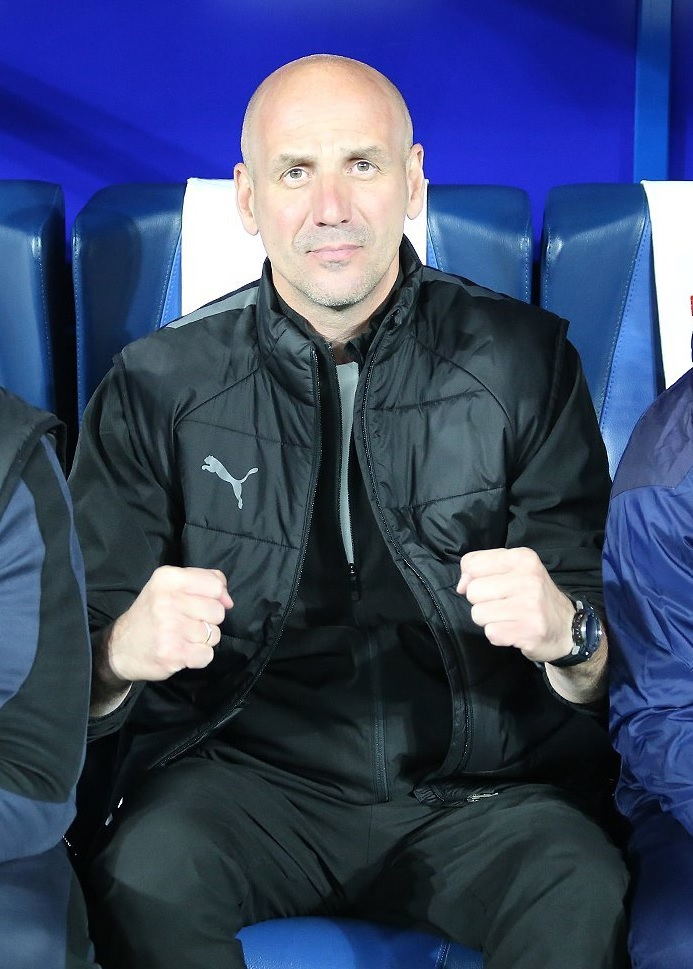
- Garanin with Sochi in 2022

Personal information
- Full name: Vadim Vyacheslavovich Garanin
- Date of birth: 29 November 1970 (age 55)
- Place of birth: Moscow, Russian SFSR, Soviet Union
- Position: Goalkeeper

Team information
- Current team: Pari Nizhny Novgorod (manager)

Youth career
- Burevestnik Moscow

Senior career*
Years	Team	Apps	(Gls)
1993	Trud Fryanovo		
1994–1996	Mashinostroitel Sergiyev Posad	78	(0)

Managerial career
- 1996–2005: DYuSSh Burevestnik Moscow
- 2005–2010: Fortuna Mytishchi
- 2012–2017: Dynamo Moscow (academy)
- 2017–2019: Arsenal Tula (assistant)
- 2019–2020: Russia U-15
- 2020–2021: Tver
- 2021–2022: Yenisey Krasnoyarsk
- 2022: Yenisey Krasnoyarsk (assistant)
- 2022: Sochi
- 2023: Yenisey Krasnoyarsk
- 2023: Baltika-BFU Kaliningrad (assistant)
- 2023–2024: Chernomorets Novorossiysk
- 2026–: Pari Nizhny Novgorod
- * Club domestic league appearances and goals

Vadim Vyacheslavovich Garanin (Russian: Вадим Вячеславович Гаранин; born 29 November 1970) is a Russian football coach and a former player who is the manager of Pari Nizhny Novgorod.

== Coaching career ==
On 20 June 2022, Garanin was appointed head coach of Russian Premier League club Sochi. As Garanin did not possess the mandatory UEFA Pro Licence, his assistant Aleksandr Tochilin was formally registered with the league as head coach. On 25 December 2022, Garanin was dismissed and replaced by Kurban Berdyev.

On 29 April 2026, Garanin was hired by Pari Nizhny Novgorod, with the club in the relegation zone of the Russian Premier League with three games left to play in the season. Pari NN gained 1 point in 3 games under Garanin's management and was relegated at the season's end.
