= 2024–25 FC Yenisey Krasnoyarsk season =

FC Yenisey Krasnoyarsk
2024–25 season
- Stadium: Central Stadium
- Russian First League: 13th
- Russian Cup: Pre-season

The 2024–25 season is the 88th season in the history of FC Yenisey Krasnoyarsk, and the club's sixth consecutive season in the Russian First League. In addition to the domestic league, the team is scheduled to participate in the Russian Cup.

== Competitions ==
=== Overall record ===
Competition	First match	Last match	Starting round	Record							
Competition	First match	Last match	Starting round	Pld	W	D	L	GF	GA	GD	Win %
Russian First League	14 July 2024		Matchday 1	5	2	0	3	4	5	−1	40.00
Russian Cup				0	0	0	0	0	0	+0	—
Total				5	2	0	3	4	5	−1	40.00

Last updated: 10 August 2024
Source: Soccerway

=== Russian First League ===
==== League table ====
Pos	Team	Pld	W	D	L	GF	GA	GD	Pts
6	SKA-Khabarovsk	34	15	8	11	44	41	+3	53
7	Rodina Moscow	34	13	11	10	41	31	+10	50
8	Yenisey Krasnoyarsk	34	14	7	13	36	39	−3	49
9	Rotor Volgograd	34	11	14	9	32	26	+6	47
10	Arsenal Tula	34	8	17	9	25	30	−5	41

Source: Soccerway
Rules for classification: 1) Points; 2) Head-to-head points; 3) Head-to-head matches won; 4) Head-to-head goal difference; 5) Head-to-head goals scored; 6) Head-to-head away goals scored; 7) Matches won; 8) Goal difference; 9) Goals scored; 10) Away matches won; 11) Away goals scored; 12) Best disciplinary record (3 points for red card, 1 point for yellow card); 13) Drawing lots. If teams tied on points did not play an equal number of head-to-head games, head-to-head criteria and disciplinary record are not used for positioning. If 1st- and 2nd-placed teams are tied in the final standings on the first 12 criteria, a winner is determined in an additional play-off game, with no extra time and a penalty-shootout if tied at the end of regulation, instead of drawing lots.

==== Results summary ====
Overall								Home						Away					
Pld	W	D	L	GF	GA	GD	Pts	W	D	L	GF	GA	GD	W	D	L	GF	GA	GD
5	2	0	3	4	5	−1	6	1	0	1	2	2	0	1	0	2	2	3	−1

Last updated: 10 August 2024.

==== Results by round ====
Round	1	2	3	4	5
Ground	H	A	H	A	A
Result	W	L	L	L	W
Position					

Updated to match(es) played on 10 August 2024. Source:
A = Away; H = Home; W = Win; D = Draw; L = Loss

==== Matches ====
The tentative match schedule was released on 27 June.

14 July 2024 1	Yenisey Krasnoyarsk	2–1	KAMAZ Naberezhnye Chelny	Krasnoyarsk
13:00 UTC+3	Tses 62'; Lomakin 72'		Gorelov 90+1'	Stadium: Central Stadium; Attendance: 4,428; Referee: Igor Zakharov

20 July 2024 2	Sokol Saratov	1–0	Yenisey Krasnoyarsk	Saratov
18:00	Sasin 27'			Stadium: Lokomotiv Stadium; Attendance: 3,080; Referee: Anton Frolov

27 July 2024 3	Yenisey Krasnoyarsk	0–1	Torpedo Moscow	Krasnoyarsk
14:00 UTC+3			Netfullin 90+4'	Stadium: Central Stadium

5 August 2024 4	Arsenal Tula	2–1	Yenisey Krasnoyarsk	Tula
19:00 UTC+3	Lipovoy 22'; Tsarayev 90+6'		Shipunov 7'	Stadium: Arsenal Stadium; Attendance: 3,980; Referee: Artur Fedorov

10 August 2024 5	Alania Vladikavkaz	0–1	Yenisey Krasnoyarsk	Grozny
19:00 UTC+3			Gilyazetdinov 59'	Stadium: Sultan Bilimkhanov Stadium; Attendance: 670; Referee: Anton Anopa
