= Artyom Meshchaninov =

Russian footballer (born 1996)

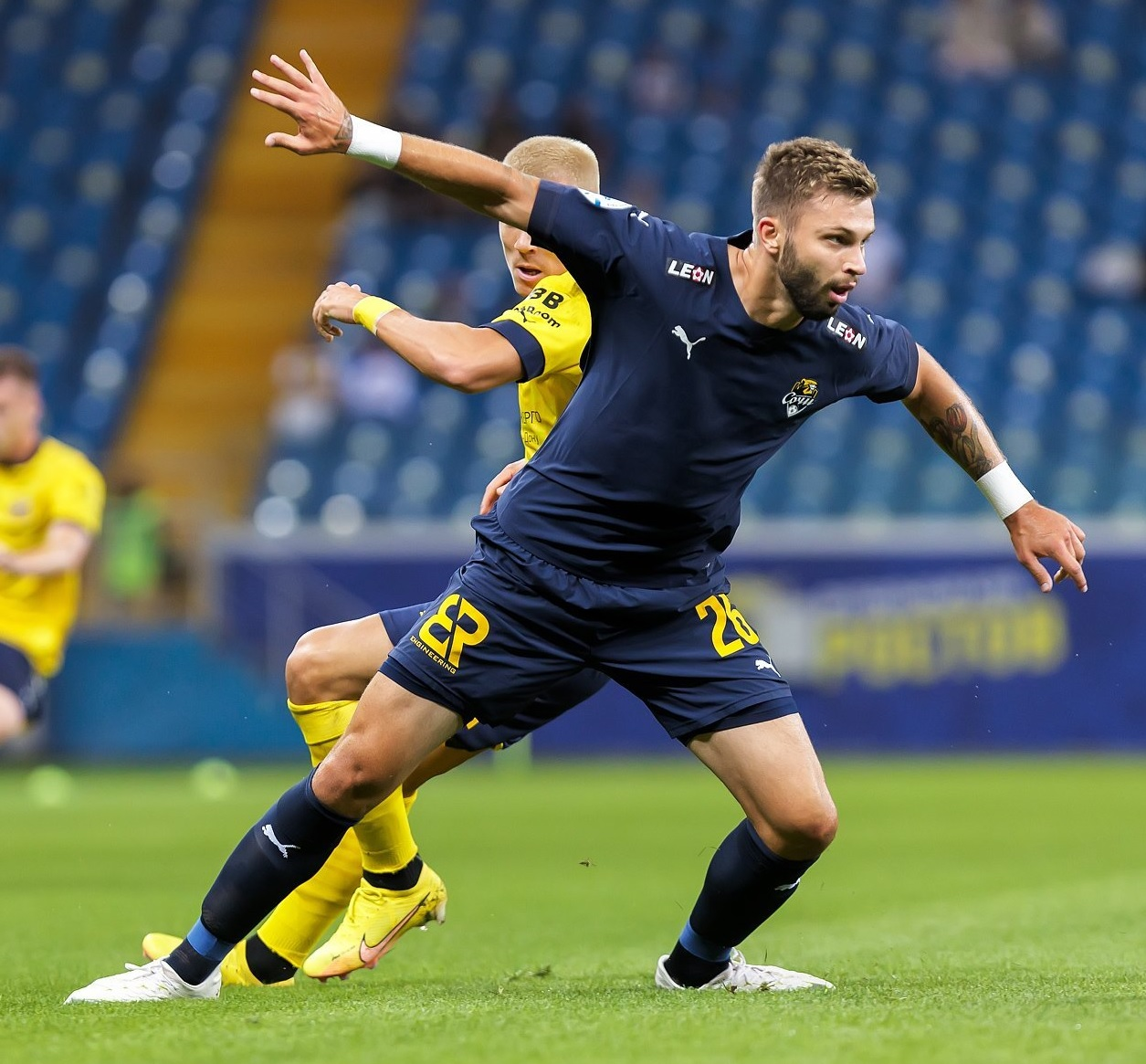
- Meshchaninov with Sochi in 2022

Personal information
- Full name: Artyom Olegovich Meshchaninov
- Date of birth: 19 February 1996 (age 30)
- Place of birth: Kolpino, Russia
- Height: 1.90 m (6 ft 3 in)
- Position: Centre-back

Team information
- Current team: FC Rodina Moscow
- Number: 26

Youth career
- 2006–2011: Izhorets Kolpino
- 2011–2012: FC Zenit St. Petersburg
- 2013: FC Trevis i VVK-d St. Petersburg
- 2014: FC Tosno
- 2015: FC Baník Ostrava

Senior career*
Years	Team	Apps	(Gls)
2016–2020	FC Baník Ostrava	42	(3)
2017	→ 1. SC Znojmo (loan)	8	(0)
2019–2020	→ FC Baltika Kaliningrad (loan)	9	(0)
2020–2022	FC Baltika Kaliningrad	70	(4)
2022–2024	PFC Sochi	19	(0)
2024–	FC Rodina Moscow	80	(2)
- * Club domestic league appearances and goals as of 22 November 2026

Artyom Olegovich Meshchaninov (Russian: Артём Олегович Мещанинов; born 19 February 1996) is a Russian football player who plays as a centre-back for FC Rodina Moscow.

== Club career ==
On 9 August 2019, he joined FC Baltika Kaliningrad on a season-long loan.

On 16 June 2022, Meshchaninov signed with Russian Premier League club PFC Sochi. He made his RPL debut for Sochi on 23 July 2022 against PFC CSKA Moscow. His contract with Sochi was terminated by mutual consent on 15 January 2024.

== Career statistics ==
As of match played 22 November 2026

Club	Season	League			Cup		Total	
Club	Season	Division	Apps	Goals	Apps	Goals	Apps	Goals
Baník Ostrava	2015–16	Czech First League	11	1	0	0	11	1
Baník Ostrava	2016–17	Czech FNL	13	2	0	0	13	2
Baník Ostrava	2017–18	Czech First League	0	0	0	0	0	0
Baník Ostrava	2018–19	Czech First League	18	0	5	0	23	0
Baník Ostrava	Total		42	3	5	0	47	3
Znojmo (loan)	2017–18	Czech FNL	8	0	1	0	9	0
Baltika Kaliningrad	2019–20	Russian First League	9	0	3	0	12	0
Baltika Kaliningrad	2020–21	Russian First League	34	1	0	0	34	1
Baltika Kaliningrad	2021–22	Russian First League	36	3	4	0	40	3
Baltika Kaliningrad	Total		79	4	7	0	86	4
Sochi	2022–23	Russian Premier League	17	0	4	0	21	0
Sochi	2023–24	Russian Premier League	2	0	5	1	7	1
Sochi	Total		19	0	9	1	28	1
Rodina Moscow	2023–24	Russian First League	5	0	1	0	6	0
Rodina Moscow	2024–25	Russian First League	31	0	0	0	31	0
Rodina Moscow	2025–26	Russian First League	31	2	0	0	31	2
Rodina Moscow	2026–27	Russian Premier League	13	0	3	0	16	0
Rodina Moscow	Total		80	2	4	0	84	2
Career total			228	9	26	1	254	10
