= Nikolay Komlichenko (footballer, born 1995) =

Russian footballer

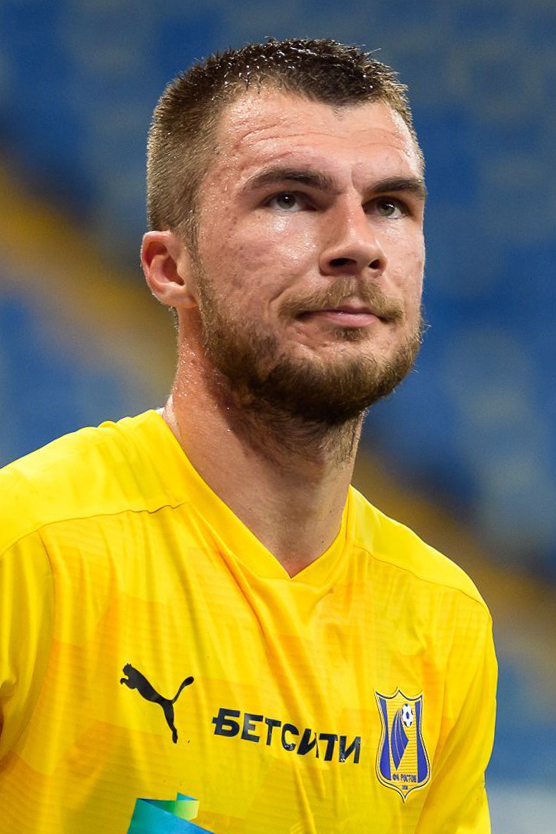
- Komlichenko with FC Rostov in 2021

Personal information
- Full name: Nikolay Nikolayevich Komlichenko
- Date of birth: 29 June 1995 (age 31)
- Place of birth: Plastunovskaya, Krasnodar Krai, Russia
- Height: 1.94 m (6 ft 4 in)
- Position: Centre-forward

Team information
- Current team: Lokomotiv Moscow
- Number: 27

Youth career
- 2010–2013: Krasnodar

Senior career*
Years	Team	Apps	(Gls)
2013–2018	Krasnodar	4	(0)
2013–2017	→ Krasnodar-2	66	(44)
2015	→ Chernomorets Novorossiysk (loan)	13	(2)
2016	→ Slovan Liberec (loan)	12	(3)
2017–2018	→ Mladá Boleslav (loan)	15	(4)
2019–2020	Mladá Boleslav	46	(37)
2020–2022	Dynamo Moscow	36	(7)
2021–2022	→ Rostov (loan)	28	(8)
2022–2025	Rostov	77	(22)
2025–	Lokomotiv Moscow	35	(8)

International career^{‡}
2014	Russia U19	2	(2)
2014–2016	Russia U21	6	(1)
2019–	Russia	12	(3)
- * Club domestic league appearances and goals as of 22 November 2026 ‡ National team caps and goals as of 17 November 2026

Nikolay Nikolayevich Komlichenko (Russian: Никола́й Никола́евич Комличе́нко; born 29 June 1995) is a Russian professional footballer who plays as a centre-forward for Lokomotiv Moscow and the Russia national team.

== Club career ==
On 17 March 2014, Komlichenko made his debut in the Russian Premier League for Krasnodar in a game against Tom Tomsk.

After playing for the Czech club Mladá Boleslav on loan for 1.5 years, he moved to the club on a permanent basis on 30 January 2019, signing a 3.5-year contract. He became the top scorer of the Czech First League in the 2018–19 season with 29 goals.

On 25 January 2020, he signed a 4.5-year contract with Russian Premier League club FC Dynamo Moscow. In his first game for Dynamo on 29 February 2020 against Spartak Moscow, he came on as a second-half substitute and two of his shots hit the goalpost and the cross-bar as Dynamo lost 2–0. In the next game on 7 March 2020 against FC Tambov he started and scored the only goal of the game in a 1–0 victory. He was voted player of the month by Dynamo fans for February/March 2020 (only one game was played in February after the winter break and Russian Premier League was suspended on 17 March due to COVID-19 pandemic in Russia).

On 11 June 2021, Komlichenko joined FC Rostov on loan with an option to purchase. On 10 July 2022, he moved to Rostov on a permanent basis and signed a four-year contract. On 1 June 2025, following Rostov's loss in the 2025 Russian Cup final, Komlichenko announced that this was his last match for Rostov as he will leave the club.

In June 2025, Komlichenko signed for Lokomotiv Moscow on a three-year deal. In May 2026, Komlichenko underwent surgery for a knee ligament injury.

== International career ==
Komlichenko was first called up to Russia national team for UEFA Euro 2020 qualifying matches against San Marino and Cyprus in June 2019, however, he did not appear. He made his debut on 10 October 2019 in a Euro qualifier against Scotland. He substituted Artyom Dzyuba (who scored twice in the game) in the 86th minute.

He scored his first national team goal on 19 November 2019 in a qualifier against San Marino.

== Personal life ==
His father, also called Nikolay, played football professionally.

== Career statistics ==
=== Club ===
As of match played 22 November 2026

Appearances and goals by club, season and competition
Club	Season	League			Cup		Europe		Other		Total	
Club	Season	Division	Apps	Goals	Apps	Goals	Apps	Goals	Apps	Goals	Apps	Goals
Krasnodar	2013–14	Russian Premier League	4	0	1	0	—		—		5	0
Krasnodar	2014–15	Russian Premier League	0	0	1	0	0	0	—		1	0
Krasnodar	Total		4	0	2	0	0	0	0	0	6	0
Krasnodar-2	2013–14	Russian Second League	22	6	—		—		—		22	6
Krasnodar-2	2014–15	Russian Second League	11	7	—		—		—		11	7
Krasnodar-2	2015–16	Russian Second League	24	24	—		—		2 (Note: Appearances in the FNL Cup)	0	26	24
Krasnodar-2	2016–17	Russian Second League	9	7	—		—		—		9	7
Krasnodar-2	Total		66	44	0	0	0	0	2	0	68	44
Chernomorets Novorossiysk (loan)	2014–15	Russian Second League	13	2	0	0	—		—		13	2
Slovan Liberec (loan)	2016–17	Czech First League	12	3	0	0	9 (Note: Appearances in UEFA Europa League)	4	—		21	7
Mladá Boleslav (loan)	2017–18	Czech First League	15	4	2	0	2	0	—		19	4
Mladá Boleslav	2018–19	Czech First League	31	27	1	0	—		5 (Note: Appearances in the Europa League play-offs)	5	37	32
Mladá Boleslav	2019–20	Czech First League	15	10	1	0	3	2	—		19	12
Mladá Boleslav	Total		46	37	2	0	3	2	5	5	56	44
Dynamo Moscow	2019–20	Russian Premier League	11	3	—		—		—		11	3
Dynamo Moscow	2020–21	Russian Premier League	25	4	1	0	1	1	—		27	5
Dynamo Moscow	Total		36	7	1	0	1	1	0	0	38	8
Rostov (loan)	2021–22	Russian Premier League	28	8	1	0	—		—		29	8
Rostov	2022–23	Russian Premier League	26	10	7	2	—		—		33	12
Rostov	2023–24	Russian Premier League	25	4	6	2	—		—		31	6
Rostov	2024–25	Russian Premier League	26	8	11	1	—		—		37	9
Rostov	Total		77	22	24	5	—		—		101	27
Lokomotiv Moscow	2025–26	Russian Premier League	26	5	10	5	—		—		36	10
Lokomotiv Moscow	2026–27	Russian Premier League	9	3	2	0	—		—		11	3
Lokomotiv Moscow	Total		35	8	12	5	—		—		47	13
Career total			332	135	44	10	15	7	7	5	398	157

=== International ===
As of match played 17 November 2026

Appearances and goals by national team and year
National team	Year	Apps	Goals
Russia	2019	3	1
Russia	2022	2	0
Russia	2023	1	0
Russia	2025	3	0
Russia	2026	3	2
Total		12	3

As of match played 12 November 2026
Scores and results list Russia's goal tally first, score column indicates score after each Komlichenko goal.

List of international goals scored by Nikolay Komlichenko
No.	Date	Venue	Cap	Opponent	Score	Result	Competition
1.	19 November 2019	San Marino Stadium, Serravalle, San Marino	3	San Marino	5–0	5–0	UEFA Euro 2020 qualification
2.	12 November 2026	Pakhtakor Central Stadium, Tashkent, Uzbekistan	11	Uzbekistan	1–2	3–2	Friendly
3.	12 November 2026	Pakhtakor Central Stadium, Tashkent, Uzbekistan	11	Uzbekistan	2–2	3–2	Friendly

== Honours ==
- Russian Professional Football League Zone South Top Goalscorer: 2015–16 (24 goals)
- Russian Professional Football League Zone South Best Player: 2015–16
- Czech First League Top Goalscorer: 2018–19 (29 goals)
- Czech First League Best Foreign Player: 2018–19
