= Timofey Shipunov =

Russian footballer (born 2003)

Personal information
- Full name: Timofey Artyomovich Shipunov
- Date of birth: 20 July 2003 (age 23)
- Place of birth: Krasnodar, Russia
- Height: 1.73 m (5 ft 8 in)
- Position: Midfielder

Team information
- Current team: Ufa
- Number: 20

Youth career
- –2021: Sochi
- 2021: UOR #5 Yegoryevsk

Senior career*
Years	Team	Apps	(Gls)
2021–2022	Tver	21	(4)
2022–2025	Sochi	17	(2)
2023–2024	→ SKA-Khabarovsk (loan)	10	(1)
2024	→ Yenisey Krasnoyarsk (loan)	17	(1)
2025–2026	Shinnik Yaroslavl	22	(0)
2026–	Ufa	0	(0)
- * Club domestic league appearances and goals as of 16 May 2026

Timofey Artyomovich Shipunov (Russian: Тимофей Артёмович Шипунов; born 20 July 2003) is a Russian footballer who plays as a midfielder for Ufa.

== Career ==
On 26 June 2022, Shipunov returned to Sochi. He made his Russian Premier League debut for Sochi on 26 August 2022 against Khimki.

On 31 August 2023, Shipunov joined SKA-Khabarovsk on loan.

== Career statistics ==
As of 27 November 2022

Club	Season	League			Cup		Continental		Total	
Club	Season	Division	Apps	Goals	Apps	Goals	Apps	Goals	Apps	Goals
Tver	2021–22	Second League	21	4	1	0	–		22	4
Sochi	2022–23	RPL	7	1	5	0	–		12	1
Career total			28	5	6	0	0	0	34	5
