= FC Tver =

- Full name: Football Club Tver
- Founded: 1908
- Ground: Yunost stadium
- Capacity: 600
- Owner: Government of Tver Oblast
- Manager: Aleksandr Averyanov
- League: Russian Second League, Division B, Group 2
- 2026: 7th
- Website: fclubtver.ru
Home colours	Away colours

FC Volga Tver old logo, until 2017

FC Tver (Russian: ФК «Тверь») is an association football club from Tver, Russia, firstly founded in 1908 as FC Volga Tver. It has played professionally in 1937, 1949, 1953 to 1956, 1958 to 1999, 2004 to 2017, and from 2020 to 2023. In 1992–1995, the club was called Trion-Volga Tver.

It played on the second-highest level (Soviet First League and Russian First Division) in 1957 to 1962, 1964 to 1969 and 1992. Another Tver team, Spartak Tver, existed from 1937 to 1957 and played in the Soviet First League in 1949 and from 1953 to 1956.

The club was dissolved at the end of the 2016–17 season due to lack of financing.

In April 2020, the club was reestablished as professional football club named FC Tver, with financial support from Tver Oblast, and FC Arsenal Tula. It was licensed for the Russian Professional Football League for 2020–21 season.

On 29 February 2024, Tver was denied the license for the 2024 Russian Second League season. The club was returned to the league after appeal.

== Current squad ==
As of 11 September 2026, according to the Second League website.

Note: Flags indicate national team as defined under FIFA eligibility rules; some limited exceptions apply. Players may hold more than one non-FIFA nationality.

No.	Pos.	Nation	Player
1	GK	RUS	Vyacheslav Shatayev
2	DF	RUS	Sergey Tormashev
4	DF	RUS	Marat Bayramov
5	MF	RUS	Vladislav Korneyev
6	DF	RUS	Arseny Miroshin
7	MF	RUS	Andrey Kovalchuk
8	MF	RUS	Islam Zangiyev
9	FW	RUS	Kirill Zakharov
15	DF	RUS	Daniil Sokolov
17	MF	RUS	Yegor Ponomaryov
18	MF	RUS	Nikolay Abdulkin
19	MF	RUS	Aleksey Stepanov
20	MF	RUS	Georgy Yemtsev
23	MF	RUS	Ivan Pugachevsky

No.	Pos.	Nation	Player
24	DF	RUS	Fyodor Motovilov
30	GK	RUS	Klim Perekalsky
33	MF	RUS	Albert Maryanyan
34	DF	RUS	Kirill Dudkin
42	MF	RUS	Anton Khomyakov
51	MF	RUS	Nikita Oleynik
52	DF	RUS	Artyom Chistyakov (on loan from Pari NN)
57	MF	RUS	Roman Kopylov
71	DF	RUS	Kirill Kudryavtsev
76	MF	RUS	Andrey Shevtsov
77	DF	RUS	Pavel Banshchikov
87	GK	RUS	Nikita Lyutikov
98	FW	RUS	Ilya Chernyshev

== Notable players ==
Had international caps for their respective countries. Players whose name is listed in bold represented their countries while playing for Volga.

Russia/USSR

- (Russia) Vladimir Beschastnykh
- (Soviet Union) Yuri Chesnokov
- (Soviet Union) Vladimir Ponomaryov

Former USSR countries

- (Azerbaijan) Emin Ağayev
- (Kazakhstan) Bolat Esmagambetov

== Honours ==
- **DCM Trophy**
  - Champions (1): 1978
