= 2023–24 PFC Sochi season =

2023–2024 PFC Sochi football season

PFC Sochi
2023–24 season
- Manager: Dmitri Khokhlov (until 17 September); Aleksandr Tochilin (17 September - 3 December); Denis Klyuyev (Caretaker) (3-15 December); Robert Moreno (from 15 December)
- Stadium: Fisht Olympic Stadium
- Premier League: 16th (Relegated)
- Russian Cup: Regions path QF Stage 1
- Top goalscorer: League: Saúl Guarirapa (8); All: Saúl Guarirapa (9)
- Highest home attendance: 8,855 vs Spartak Moscow (13 April 2024)
- Lowest home attendance: 1,681 vs Orenburg (4 October 2023)
- Average home league attendance: 4,942 (18 May 2024)

The 2023–24 PFC Sochi season was Sochi's fifth season in the Russian Premier League, the highest tier of association football in Russia, and their sixth season as a club. Sochi finished the season in 16th and were relegated back to the Russian First League, whilst being eliminated from the Russian Cup by SKA-Khabarovsk Regions path Quarter-finals Stage 1.

== Squad ==
As of match played 25 May 2024

| No. | Name | Nationality | Position | Date of birth (age) | Signed from | Signed in | Contract ends | Apps. | Goals |
Goalkeepers
| 1 | Maksim Rudakov | (Russia) | GK | 22 January 1996 (aged 28) | Rostov | 2024 | | 5 | 0 |
| 12 | Nikolai Zabolotny | (Russia) | GK | 16 April 1990 (aged 34) | Rotor Volgograd | 2018 | | 89 | 0 |
| 13 | Nikita Goylo | (Russia) | GK | 10 August 1998 (aged 25) | on loan from Zenit St.Petersburg | 2023 | 2024 | 10 | 0 |
Defenders
| 2 | Dmitri Chistyakov | (Russia) | DF | 13 January 1994 (aged 30) | on loan from Zenit St.Petersburg | 2024 | 2024 | 7 | 0 |
| 3 | Vanja Drkušić | (Slovenia) | DF | 30 October 1999 (aged 24) | Bravo | 2022 | | 66 | 4 |
| 4 | Vyacheslav Litvinov | (Russia) | DF | 1 April 2001 (aged 23) | Krasnodar | 2023 | | 7 | 0 |
| 17 | Artyom Makarchuk | (Russia) | DF | 9 November 1995 (aged 28) | Baltika Kaliningrad | 2022 | | 75 | 3 |
| 25 | Yahia Attiyat Allah | (Morocco) | DF | 2 March 1995 (aged 29) | Wydad | 2024 | | 11 | 1 |
| 27 | Kirill Zaika | (Russia) | DF | 7 October 1992 (aged 31) | Khimki | 2018 | | 145 | 6 |
| 33 | Marcelo Alves | (Brazil) | DF | 7 February 1998 (aged 26) | Madureira | 2024 | | 29 | 2 |
| 34 | Timofei Margasov | (Russia) | DF | 12 June 1992 (aged 31) | Lokomotiv Moscow | 2020 | | 146 | 3 |
| 42 | Astemir Khezhev | (Russia) | DF | 18 June 2005 (aged 18) | Academy | 2024 | | 1 | 0 |
| 71 | Jurij Medveděv | (Czech Republic) | DF | 18 June 1996 (aged 27) | Slovan Bratislava | 2023 | | 16 | 1 |
Midfielders
| 5 | Victorien Angban | (Ivory Coast) | MF | 29 September 1996 (aged 27) | Metz | 2021 | 2026 | 47 | 1 |
| 6 | Artur Yusupov | (Russia) | MF | 1 September 1989 (aged 34) | Dynamo Moscow | 2020 | | 114 | 21 |
| 14 | Kirill Kravtsov | (Russia) | MF | 14 June 2002 (aged 21) | Zenit St.Petersburg | 2022 | | 58 | 5 |
| 18 | Nikita Burmistrov | (Russia) | MF | 6 July 1989 (aged 34) | Rotor Volgograd | 2018 | | 166 | 17 |
| 19 | Aleksei Sutormin | (Russia) | MF | 10 January 1994 (aged 30) | on loan from Zenit St. Petersburg | 2024 | 2024 | 10 | 2 |
| 21 | Ignacio Saavedra | (Chile) | MF | 12 January 1999 (aged 25) | Universidad Católica | 2024 | | 13 | 1 |
| 24 | Miguel Silveira | (Brazil) | MF | 26 March 2003 (aged 21) | Red Bull Bragantino | 2023 | | 32 | 2 |
| 77 | Aleksandar Jukić | (Austria) | MF | 26 July 2000 (aged 23) | Austria Wien | 2024 | | 13 | 1 |
Forwards
| 7 | Martin Kramarič | (Slovenia) | FW | 14 November 1997 (aged 26) | Bravo | 2023 | | 27 | 5 |
| 10 | Sergio Córdova | (Venezuela) | FW | 9 August 1997 (aged 26) | on loan from Alanyaspor | 2024 | 2024 | 11 | 0 |
| 23 | Saúl Guarirapa | (Venezuela) | FW | 18 October 2002 (aged 21) | on loan from Caracas | 2024 | 2024 | 11 | 9 |
Away on loan
| 8 | Amir Batyrev | (Canada) | MF | 11 March 2002 (aged 22) | Tver | 2022 | | 30 | 1 |
| 15 | Solomon Agbalaka | (Nigeria) | DF | 9 November 2003 (aged 20) | Broad City | 2024 | | 2 | 0 |
| 19 | Timofey Shipunov | (Russia) | MF | 20 July 2003 (aged 20) | Tver | 2022 | | 24 | 2 |
| 53 | Aleksandr Deryugin | (Russia) | MF | 22 March 2004 (aged 20) | Academy | 2023 | | 1 | 0 |
| | Timofey Kashintsev | (Russia) | GK | 1 August 2004 (aged 19) | Tekstilshchik Ivanovo | 2024 | | 0 | 0 |
| | Moussa Sissako | (Mali) | DF | 10 November 2000 (aged 23) | Standard Liège | 2022 | | 15 | 1 |
| | Artur Kuskov | (Russia) | DF | 6 February 2004 (aged 20) | Academy | 2021 | | 0 | 0 |
| | Hovhannes Harutyunyan | (Armenia) | MF | 25 May 1999 (aged 25) | Pyunik | 2024 | | 0 | 0 |
| | Maksim Kolmakov | (Russia) | MF | 5 January 2003 (aged 21) | Dynamo Brest | 2019 | | 1 | 0 |
| | Daniil Martovoy | (Russia) | MF | 20 April 2003 (aged 21) | Tver | 2022 | | 4 | 0 |
| | Aleksey Filimonov | (Russia) | MF | 19 January 2004 (aged 20) | Academy | 2022 | | 0 | 0 |
Players that left Sochi during the season
| 9 | Georgi Melkadze | (Russia) | FW | 4 April 1997 (aged 27) | Spartak Moscow | 2022 | | 53 | 7 |
| 10 | Ivan Ignatyev | (Russia) | FW | 6 January 1999 (aged 25) | Lokomotiv Moscow | 2023 | | 18 | 2 |
| 11 | Luka Đorđević | (Montenegro) | FW | 9 July 1994 (aged 29) | Vejle | 2022 | | 31 | 4 |
| 16 | Christian Noboa | (Ecuador) | MF | 9 April 1985 (aged 39) | Zenit St.Petersburg | 2019 | | 116 | 40 |
| 20 | Igor Yurganov | (Russia) | DF | 10 December 1993 (aged 30) | Dynamo St.Petersburg | 2018 | | 101 | 4 |
| 26 | Artyom Meshchaninov | (Russia) | DF | 19 February 1996 (aged 28) | Baltika Kaliningrad | 2022 | | 28 | 1 |
| 45 | Ivan Miladinović | (Serbia) | DF | 14 August 1994 (aged 29) | Radnički Niš | 2018 | | 116 | 3 |
| 99 | Alejandro Cabeza | (Ecuador) | FW | 11 March 1997 (aged 27) | Emelec | 2023 | | 1 | 0 |

== Transfers ==
=== In ===
| Date | Position | Nationality | Name | From | Fee | Ref. |
|---|---|---|---|---|---|---|
| 14 June 2023 | DF | (Russia) | Vyacheslav Litvinov | Krasnodar | Undisclosed | |
| 20 June 2023 | DF | (Czech Republic) | Jurij Medveděv | Slovan Bratislava | Undisclosed | |
| 20 June 2023 | FW | (Slovenia) | Martin Kramarič | Bravo | Undisclosed | |
| 22 June 2023 | FW | (Russia) | Ivan Ignatyev | Lokomotiv Moscow | Undisclosed | |
| 6 July 2023 | GK | (Russia) | Timofey Kashintsev | Tekstilshchik Ivanovo | Undisclosed | |
| 9 July 2023 | GK | (Russia) | Aleksandr Dyogtev | Zenit St.Petersburg | Undisclosed | |
| 24 October 2023 | FW | (Ecuador) | Alejandro Cabeza | Emelec | Undisclosed | |
| 16 January 2024 | MF | (Austria) | Aleksandar Jukić | Austria Wien | Undisclosed | |
| 17 January 2024 | MF | (Armenia) | Hovhannes Harutyunyan | Pyunik | Undisclosed | |
| 24 January 2024 | MF | (Chile) | Ignacio Saavedra | Universidad Católica | Undisclosed | |
| 8 February 2024 | DF | (Morocco) | Yahia Attiyat Allah | Wydad | Undisclosed | |
| 9 February 2024 | GK | (Russia) | Maksim Rudakov | Rostov | Undisclosed | |
| 18 February 2024 | DF | (Nigeria) | Solomon Agbalaka | Broad City | Undisclosed | |
| 22 February 2024 | DF | (Brazil) | Marcelo Alves | Madureira | Undisclosed | |

=== Loans in ===
| Date from | Position | Nationality | Name | From | Date to | Ref. |
|---|---|---|---|---|---|---|
| 24 June 2023 | DF | (Brazil) | Marcelo Alves | Madureira | 22 February 2024 | |
| 25 July 2023 | GK | (Russia) | Nikita Goylo | Zenit St.Petersburg | End of the season | |
| 9 August 2023 | DF | (Nigeria) | Solomon Agbalaka | Broad City | 18 February 2024 | |
| 14 January 2024 | DF | (Russia) | Dmitri Chistyakov | Zenit St.Petersburg | End of season | |
| 18 January 2024 | FW | (Venezuela) | Saúl Guarirapa | Caracas | End of season | |
| 5 February 2024 | FW | (Venezuela) | Sergio Córdova | Alanyaspor | End of season | |
| 11 February 2024 | MF | (Russia) | Aleksei Sutormin | Zenit St.Petersburg | End of season | |

=== Out ===
| Date | Position | Nationality | Name | To | Fee | Ref. |
|---|---|---|---|---|---|---|
| 25 July 2023 | GK | (Russia) | Denis Adamov | Zenit St.Petersburg | Undisclosed | |
| 24 January 2024 | MF | (Ecuador) | Christian Noboa | Emelec | Undisclosed | |
| 16 February 2024 | FW | (Russia) | Daniil Pavlov | Avangard Kursk | Undisclosed | |
| 20 February 2024 | DF | (Russia) | Igor Yurganov | Fakel Voronezh | Undisclosed | |
| 28 March 2024 | FW | (Ecuador) | Alejandro Cabeza | 9 de Octubre | Undisclosed | |

=== Loans out ===
| Date from | Position | Nationality | Name | From | Date to | Ref. |
|---|---|---|---|---|---|---|
| 16 February 2024 | FW | (Russia) | Daniil Pavlov | Arsenal Tula | 16 February 2024 | |
| 11 February 2024 | GK | (Russia) | Timofey Kashintsev | Tekstilshchik Ivanovo | End of season | |
| 22 February 2024 | DF | (Nigeria) | Solomon Agbalaka | Iberia 1999 | 31 December 2024 | |
| 22 February 2024 | MF | (Canada) | Amir Batyrev | Sokol Saratov | End of season | |
| 27 February 2024 | MF | (Armenia) | Hovhannes Harutyunyan | Pyunik | End of season | |

=== Released ===
| Date | Position | Nationality | Name | Joined | Date | Ref. |
|---|---|---|---|---|---|---|
| 14 January 2024 | FW | (Russia) | Ivan Ignatyev | Železničar Pančevo | 30 January 2024 | |
| 14 January 2024 | FW | (Russia) | Georgi Melkadze | Kolkheti-1913 Poti | 27 January 2024 | |
| 15 January 2024 | DF | (Russia) | Artyom Meshchaninov | Rodina Moscow | 29 January 2024 | |
| 23 January 2024 | DF | (Serbia) | Ivan Miladinović | Tobol | 31 January 2024 | |
| 30 January 2024 | FW | (Montenegro) | Luka Đorđević | Abha | 11 February 2024 | |

== Friendlies ==
| 2 February 2024 | Sochi | 0 – 0 | Akhmat Grozny | Belek, Turkey |
| 16:30 MSK (UTC+3) | Guarirapa (penalty missed) | Report | | Stadium: Regnum Sports Complex |

| 8 February 2024 | Sochi | 1 – 0 | Slavia Sofia | Belek, Turkey |
| 15:00 MSK (UTC+3) | Miguel 57' | Report | | Stadium: Regnum Sports Complex |

| 9 February 2024 | Sochi | 2 – 1 | CSKA Moscow | Belek, Turkey |
| 15:00 MSK (UTC+3) | Burmistrov 11'; Kramarič 42' | Report | Dávila 9' | Stadium: Regnum Sports Complex |

| 15 February 2024 | Sochi | 0 – 1 | Neftchi Fergana | Belek, Turkey |
| 16:00 MSK (UTC+3) | Burmistrov (yellow card) (yellow-red card) 86' | Report | Norchaev 9' | Stadium: Mardan Training Complex |

== Competitions ==
=== Overall record ===
| Competition | First match | Last match | Starting round | Final position | Record | | | | | | | |
| Competition | First match | Last match | Starting round | Final position | Pld | W | D | L | GF | GA | GD | Win % |
|---|---|---|---|---|---|---|---|---|---|---|---|---|
| Premier League | 23 July 2023 | 25 May 2024 | Matchday 1 | 16th | 30 | 5 | 9 | 16 | 37 | 48 | −11 | 16.67 |
| Russian Cup | 26 July 2023 | 14 March 2024 | Group stage | Regions QF 1 Stage 1 | 7 | 2 | 3 | 2 | 8 | 7 | +1 | 28.57 |
| Total | | | | | 37 | 7 | 12 | 18 | 45 | 55 | −10 | 18.92 |

Last updated: 25 May 2024
Source: Soccerway

=== Premier League ===
==== League table ====
| Pos | Team | Pld | W | D | L | GF | GA | GD | Pts | Qualification or relegation |
|---|---|---|---|---|---|---|---|---|---|---|
| 12 | Orenburg | 30 | 7 | 10 | 13 | 34 | 41 | −7 | 31 | |
| 13 | Pari Nizhny Novgorod (O) | 30 | 8 | 6 | 16 | 29 | 51 | −22 | 30 (Note: Pari NN is ahead of Ural on head-to-head points: Pari NN 4, Ural 1.) | Qualification to relegation play-offs |
| 14 | Ural Yekaterinburg (R) | 30 | 7 | 9 | 14 | 30 | 46 | −16 | 30 | Qualification to relegation play-offs |
| 15 | Baltika Kaliningrad (R) | 30 | 7 | 5 | 18 | 33 | 42 | −9 | 26 | Relegation to First League |
| 16 | Sochi (R) | 30 | 5 | 9 | 16 | 37 | 48 | −11 | 24 | Relegation to First League |

Source: Premier Liga
Rules for classification: 1) Points; 2) Head-to-head points; 3) Head-to-head matches won; 4) Head-to-head goal difference; 5) Head-to-head goals scored; 6) Matches won; 7) Goal difference; 8) Goals scored; 9) 2022–23 position (not applicable to final standings); 10) Play-off. Note: if teams tied on points played an equal number of head-to-head games, head-to-head results are considered in aggregate, in a separate 'table'. If teams tied on points played a different number of head-to-head games, head-to-head criteria are considered in one-on-one pairs for each team against each other, then the teams are ordered by the number of one-on-one matchups they have advantage in.
(O) Play-off winners; (R) Relegated

==== Results summary ====
| Overall | | | | | | | | Home | | | | | | Away | | | | | |
| Pld | W | D | L | GF | GA | GD | Pts | W | D | L | GF | GA | GD | W | D | L | GF | GA | GD |
|---|---|---|---|---|---|---|---|---|---|---|---|---|---|---|---|---|---|---|---|
| 30 | 5 | 9 | 16 | 37 | 48 | −11 | 24 | 4 | 5 | 6 | 24 | 21 | +3 | 1 | 4 | 10 | 13 | 27 | −14 |

Last updated: 25 May 2024.

==== Results by round ====
| Round | 1 | 2 | 3 | 4 | 5 | 6 | 7 | 8 | 9 | 10 | 11 | 12 | 13 | 14 | 15 | 16 | 17 | 18 | 19 | 20 | 22 | 23 | 24 | 25 | 21^{1} | 26 | 27 | 28 | 29 | 30 |
|---|---|---|---|---|---|---|---|---|---|---|---|---|---|---|---|---|---|---|---|---|---|---|---|---|---|---|---|---|---|---|
| Ground | H | A | H | A | H | H | A | A | A | A | H | A | A | H | H | A | H | H | A | A | H | A | H | H | A | H | A | H | H | A |
| Result | W | L | L | L | W | L | L | L | L | L | L | W | L | D | L | L | L | D | D | D | D | D | W | D | L | D | L | W | L | D |
| Position | 3 | 9 | 10 | 11 | 11 | 12 | 12 | 13 | 15 | 16 | 16 | 16 | 16 | 16 | 16 | 16 | 16 | 16 | 16 | 16 | 16 | 16 | 16 | 16 | 16 | 16 | 16 | 16 | 16 | 16 |

Updated to match(es) played on 25 May 2024. Source: See Results
A = Away; H = Home; W = Win; D = Draw; L = Loss

==== Results ====
The league fixtures were unveiled on 24 June 2023.

| 23 July 2023 1 | Sochi | 2–0 | Baltika Kaliningrad | Sochi |
| 20:00 MSK (UTC+3) | Kramarič 6'; Drkušić 83'; Yusupov (yellow card) 87' | Report | Kuzmin (yellow card) 77' | Stadium: Fisht Olympic Stadium; Attendance: 4,535; Referee: Rafael Shafeev |

| 30 July 2023 2 | Krasnodar | 2–0 | Sochi | Krasnodar |
| 20:00 MSK (UTC+3) | Kaio 45+'; Córdoba 90+' (yellow card) 90+' | Report | | Stadium: Krasnodar Stadium; Attendance: 13,290; Referee: Vladimir Moskalyov |

| 6 August 2023 3 | Sochi | 1–2 | Akhmat Grozny | Sochi |
| 20:00 MSK (UTC+3) | Noboa 36' (pen.); Đorđević (yellow card) 50' | Report | Ilyin 42'; Timofeyev 45+'; Čeliković (yellow card) 90+' | Stadium: Fisht Olympic Stadium; Attendance: 5,366; Referee: Pavel Shadykhanov |

| 13 August 2023 4 | CSKA Moscow | 3–1 | Sochi | Moscow |
| 20:00 MSK (UTC+3) | Moisés (yellow card) 12'; Mukhin (yellow card) 29'; Đorđević 51' (o.g.); Zabolotnyi 89'; Ryadno 90+4' | Report | Đorđević (yellow card) 15'; Alves (yellow card) 34' (yellow-red card) 47'; Miguel 78'; Miladinović (yellow card) 87'; Kravtsov (yellow card) 90' | Stadium: VEB Arena; Attendance: 7,150; Referee: Artem Chistyakov |

| 19 August 2023 5 | Sochi | 4–0 | Rostov | Sochi |
| 20:00 MSK (UTC+3) | Kramarič 16', 69'; Đorđević 28'; Medveděv 78' | Report | Prokhin (yellow card) 34' | Stadium: Fisht Olympic Stadium; Attendance: 6,299; Referee: Roman Galimov |

| 27 August 2023 6 | Sochi | 0–1 | Lokomotiv Moscow | Sochi |
| 20:00 MSK (UTC+3) | Noboa (yellow card) 31' | Report | Barinov (yellow card) 38'; Rybchinsky (yellow card) 45+2'; Glushenkov 57'; Nenakhov (yellow card) 81' | Stadium: Fisht Olympic Stadium; Attendance: 6,089; Referee: Lubomir Suchy |

| 3 September 2023 7 | Orenburg | 3–0 | Sochi | Orenburg |
| 13:00 MSK (UTC+3) | Mansilla 55' (pen.); Obukhov 58'; Kaplenko (yellow card) 82'; Cuero 90+' (pen.) | Report | Miladinović (yellow card) 33'; Melkadze (yellow card) 35'; Yusupov (yellow card) 42'; Đorđević (yellow card) 47'; Batyrev (yellow card) 78' | Stadium: Gazovik Stadium; Attendance: 4,433; Referee: Evgeniy Bulanov |

| 16 September 2023 8 | Spartak Moscow | 1–0 | Sochi | Moscow |
| 19:00 MSK (UTC+3) | Khlusevich (yellow card) 29'; Babić 90+'; Sobolev (yellow card) 90+' | Report | Batyrev (yellow card) 4'; Zabolotny (yellow card) 88' | Stadium: Lukoil Arena; Attendance: 8,760; Referee: Artyom Chistyakov |

| 23 September 2023 9 | Krylia Sovetov | 2–1 | Sochi | Samara |
| 14:00 MSK (UTC+3) | Saltykov 4'; Rahmanović 41' | Report | Noboa (yellow card) 47' (goal) 90+' (pen.); Burmistrov (yellow card) 57'; Marcelo (yellow card) 67' | Stadium: Solidarnost Samara Arena; Attendance: 9,651; Referee: Sergey Ivanov |

| 1 October 2023 10 | Fakel Voronezh | 2–0 | Sochi | Voronezh |
| 14:00 MSK (UTC+3) | Markov 43' (pen.); Yakimov 47' | Report | Litvinov (yellow card) 3'; Noboa (yellow card) 31'; Marcelo (yellow card) 50'; Burmistrov (yellow card) 51' | Stadium: Tsentralnyi Profsoyuz Stadion; Attendance: 10,877; Referee: Roman Safyan |

| 7 October 2023 11 | Sochi | 0–2 | Zenit St.Petersburg | Sochi |
| 14:00 MSK (UTC+3) | Zaika (yellow card) 84' | Report | Claudinho 9' (pen.); Cassierra 30' | Stadium: Fisht Olympic Stadium; Attendance: 5,617; Referee: Vladislav Bezborodov |

| 22 October 2023 12 | Ural Yekaterinburg | 1–4 | Sochi | Yekaterinburg |
| 12:00 MSK (UTC+3) | Yegorychev 38'; Ayupov (yellow card) 87' | Report | Đorđević (yellow card) 2'; Kravtsov 15'; Burmistrov 17'; Kramarič 34'; Ignatyev 88' (pen.) | Stadium: Central Stadium; Attendance: 7,817; Referee: Vladimir Moskalyov |

| 29 October 2023 13 | Pari NN | 1–0 | Sochi | Nizhny Novgorod |
| 14:00 MSK (UTC+3) | Kalinsky 39' (yellow card) 62'; Tolstopyatov (yellow card) 56'; Stamatov (yellow card) 70' | Report | Drkušić (penalty missed) 62'; Noboa (penalty missed) 90+' | Stadium: Nizhny Novgorod Stadium; Attendance: 4,570; Referee: Sergey Tsyganok |

| 6 November 2023 14 | Sochi | 3–3 | Dynamo Moscow | Sochi |
| 19:30 MSK (UTC+3) | Burmistrov 24'; Kramarič (yellow card) 31'; Đorđević 38', 62'; Drkušić (yellow card) 60', (goal) 73'; Litvinov (yellow card) 89'; Marcelo (yellow card) 90+2' (yellow-red card) 90+6' | Report | Chávez 26'; Tyukavin 42'; Gladyshev 44' | Stadium: Fisht Olympic Stadium; Attendance: 4,200; Referee: Vladislav Bezborodov |

| 11 November 2023 15 | Sochi | 0–2 | Rubin Kazan | Sochi |
| 19:00 MSK (UTC+3) | Kravtsov (yellow card) 6' (yellow-red card) 54'; Yusupov (yellow card) 90+5' | | Bezrukov 39' (Vada); Daku 66' (Gritsayenko) | Stadium: Fisht Olympic Stadium; Attendance: 2,992; Referee: Sergey Tsyganok |

| 25 November 2023 16 | Zenit St.Petersburg | 3–0 | Sochi | Saint Petersburg |
| 15:15 MSK (UTC+3) | Rodrigão 45+2'; Claudinho 53'; Isidor 59'; Mostovoy 89' | Report | Ignatjev (yellow card) 3' | Stadium: Krestovsky Stadium; Attendance: 21,964; Referee: Kirill Levnikov |

| 2 December 2023 17 | Sochi | 0–2 | Krylia Sovetov | Sochi |
| 16:30 MSK (UTC+3) | Yurganov (yellow card) 33'; Yusupov (yellow card) 45+'; Zaika (yellow card) 90+' | Report | Fernando (yellow card) 20'; Yezhov 71'; Garré 90+' (pen.) | Stadium: Fisht Olympic Stadium; Attendance: 2,637; Referee: Vladimir Moskalyov |

| 10 October 2023 18 | Sochi | 1–1 | Orenburg | Sochi |
| 16:30 MSK (UTC+3) | Ignatyev 42' | Report | Oganesyan (yellow card) 21'; Mansilla (yellow card) 78'; Mikhaylov (yellow card) 84'; Vera (yellow card) 89'; Khotulyov 90+' | Stadium: Fisht Olympic Stadium; Attendance: 1,968; Referee: Evgeniy Kukulyak |

| 3 March 2024 19 | Baltika Kaliningrad | 0–0 | Sochi | Kaliningrad |
| 19:00 MSK (UTC+3) | Bistrović (yellow card) 39'; Luna (yellow card) 55'; Lisakovich (yellow card) 79' | Report | Saavedra (yellow card) 6'; Kramarič (yellow card) 89' | Stadium: Kaliningrad Stadium; Attendance: 10,701; Referee: Rafael Shafeev |

| 10 March 2024 20 | Lokomotiv Moscow | 2–2 | Sochi | Moscow |
| 16:30 MSK (UTC+3) | Zhemaletdinov 2'; Karpukas (yellow card) 28' (yellow-red card) 52'; Glushenkov 42'; Barino (yellow card) 47'; Pinyaev (yellow card) 90+2' | Report | Yusupov 4'; Medveděv (yellow card) 21'; Alves 51'; Saavedra (yellow card) 65'; Córdova (red card) 75' | Stadium: RZD Arena; Attendance: 6,024; Referee: Sergey Cheban |

| 30 March 2024 22 | Sochi | 2–2 | CSKA Moscow | Sochi |
| 16:30 MSK (UTC+3) | Chistyakov (yellow card) 8'; Guarirapa 50'; Kramarič 73'; Kravtsov (yellow card) 86' | Report | Chistyakov 16' (o.g.); Zabolotny 46'; Zdjelar (yellow card) 86'; Oblyakov (yellow card) 87' | Stadium: Fisht Olympic Stadium; Attendance: 5,681; Referee: Vasily Kazartsev |

| 6 April 2024 23 | Rostov | 2–2 | Sochi | Rostov-on-Don |
| 20:00 MSK (UTC+3) | Golenkov 1'; Ronaldo 45+'; Sako (yellow card) 52'; Mohebi (yellow card) 85' | Report | Kravtsov 6'; Guarirapa 35' (yellow card) 86'; Córdova (yellow card) 64'; Zaika (yellow card) 90+'; Litvinov (yellow card) 90+' | Stadium: Rostov Arena; Attendance: 13,770; Referee: Evgeniy Kukulyak |

| 13 April 2024 24 | Sochi | 1–0 | Spartak Moscow | Sochi |
| 14:00 MSK (UTC+3) | Attiyat Allah 76'; Miguel (yellow card) 80'; Zabolotny (yellow card) 90+4' | Report | Khlusevich (yellow card) 80' | Stadium: Fisht Olympic Stadium; Attendance: 8,855; Referee: Rafael Shafeev |

| 21 April 2024 25 | Sochi | 2–2 | Ural Yekaterinburg | Sochi |
| 18:15 MSK (UTC+3) | Zaika (yellow card) 55'; Guarirapa 77'; Jukić 88' | Report | Dmitriyev (yellow card) 19'; Ionov 46', 67'; Kiki (yellow card) 90+' | Stadium: Fisht Olympic Stadium; Attendance: 3,853; Referee: Sergei Karasev |

| 25 April 2024 21 | Akhmat Grozny | 1–0 | Sochi | Grozny |
| 20:30 MSK (UTC+3) | Sadulayev 30'; Kamilov (yellow card) 44'; Berisha (yellow card) 85' | Report | Saavedra (yellow card) 26' | Stadium: Akhmat-Arena; Attendance: 5,790; Referee: Sergey Ivanov |

| 29 April 2024 26 | Sochi | 0–0 | Fakel Voronezh | Sochi |
| 17:30 MSK (UTC+3) | Zaika (yellow card) 4'; Córdova (yellow card) 18'; Guarirapa (yellow card) 87' | Report | Yakimov (yellow card) 14'; Yurganov (yellow card) 48'; Belenov (yellow card) 89'; Senhadji (yellow card) 90+' | Stadium: Fisht Olympic Stadium; Attendance: 4,548; Referee: Rafael Shafeev |

| 5 May 2024 27 | Dynamo Moscow | 3–2 | Sochi | Moscow |
| 16:30 MSK (UTC+3) | Balbuena (yellow card) 13'; Tyukavin 53'; Bitello 85', (yellow card) 86'; Ngamaleu 90+5' | Report | Chistyakov (yellow card) 57'; Guarirapa 83'; Saavedra 90' | Stadium: VTB Arena; Attendance: 8,240; Referee: Artem Chistyakov |

| 12 May 2024 28 | Sochi | 6–1 | Pari NN | Sochi |
| 19:00 MSK (UTC+3) | Kravtsov 9' (yellow card) 84'; Guarirapa 32'; Marcelo 66'; Sutormin 74' (pen.), 83'; Burmistrov 87' | Report | Aleksandrov (yellow card) 64'; Zé Turbo 88' | Stadium: Fisht Olympic Stadium; Attendance: 2,725; Referee: Evgeniy Kukulyak |

| 18 May 2024 29 | Sochi | 2–3 | Krasnodar | Sochi |
| 19:00 MSK (UTC+3) | Guarirapa 43', 73'; Drkušić (yellow card) 80'; Makarchuk (yellow card) 90+' | Report | Krivtsov 5'; Spertsyan 85' (pen.); Cobnan 90+' | Stadium: Fisht Olympic Stadium; Attendance: 8,782; Referee: Pavel Shadykhanov |

| 25 May 2024 30 | Rubin Kazan | 1–1 | Sochi | Kazan |
| 16:30 MSK (UTC+3) | Daku 22'; Kabutov (yellow card) 75'; Rozhkov (yellow card) 90' | Report | Zaika (yellow card) 42'; Drkušić (yellow card) 45+'; Burmistrov (yellow card) 73'; Marcelo (yellow card) 85'; Guarirapa 87' | Stadium: Ak Bars Arena; Attendance: 7,399; Referee: Egor Egorov |

=== Russian Cup ===
==== Group stage ====
| Pos | Team | Pld | W | PW | PL | L | GF | GA | GD | Pts | Qualification |
|---|---|---|---|---|---|---|---|---|---|---|---|
| 1 | CSKA Moscow | 6 | 2 | 2 | 1 | 1 | 11 | 5 | +6 | 11 (Note: Head-to-head points: CSKA 6, Orenburg 0.) | Qualification to the Knockout phase (RPL path) |
| 2 | Orenburg | 6 | 3 | 1 | 0 | 2 | 6 | 10 | −4 | 11 | Qualification to the Knockout phase (RPL path) |
| 3 | Sochi | 6 | 2 | 0 | 2 | 2 | 7 | 6 | +1 | 8 | Qualification to the Knockout phase (regions path) |
| 4 | Fakel Voronezh | 6 | 1 | 1 | 1 | 3 | 4 | 7 | −3 | 6 | |

Source: Russian Football Union (in Russian), Soccerway
Rules for classification: 1) Points; 2) Head-to-head points; 3) Head-to-head matches won; 4) Head-to-head goal difference; 5) Head-to-head goals scored; 6) Matches won; 7) Goal difference; 8) Goals scored; 9) Penalty shoot-out goal difference; 10) Draw.
Notes:

| 26 July 2023 1 | Fakel Voronezh | 1–3 | Sochi | Voronezh |
| 16:15 MSK (UTC+3) | Cherov 28'; Masternoy (yellow card) 30'; Appayev (yellow card) 55'; Kudryashov (red card) 68'; Markov (yellow card) 90' | Report | Silveira 21'; Burmistrov (yellow card) 37'; Batyrev (yellow card) 43'; Kravtsov 45+3' (yellow card) 85'; Zaika 78'; Medveděv (yellow card) 87' | Stadium: Tsentralnyi Profsoyuz Stadion; Attendance: 13,507; Referee: Sergey Cheban |

| 9 August 2023 2 | Orenburg | 2–0 | Sochi | Orenburg |
| 16:15 MSK (UTC+3) | Florentín 12'; Oganesyan 25'; Muro (yellow card) 50' | Report | Shipunov (yellow card) 39'; Kravtsov (yellow card) 81' | Stadium: Gazovik Stadium; Attendance: 2,223; Referee: Evgeny Turbin |

| 30 August 2023 3 | Sochi | 0–0 (4–5 p) | CSKA Moscow | Sochi |
| 17:15 MSK (UTC+3) | | Report | Gajić (yellow card) 50'; Méndez (yellow card) 54'; Nababkin (yellow card) 77' | Stadium: Fisht Olympic Stadium; Attendance: 6,333; Referee: Rafael Shafeev |
| | Penalties |
| | Yusupov (penalty scored); Ignatjev (penalty missed); Alves (penalty scored); Batyrev (penalty scored); Kramarič (penalty scored); Yurganov (penalty missed); Medveděv (penalty missed) | | Chalov (penalty missed); Zabolotnyi (penalty scored); Kislyak (penalty scored); Nababkin (penalty scored); Oblyakov (penalty scored); Méndez (penalty missed); Gajić (penalty scored) |

| 20 September 2023 4 | CSKA Moscow | 1–1 (4–2 p) | Sochi | Moscow |
| 15:00 MSK (UTC+3) | Oblyakov 78' | Report | Noboa 43'; Angban (yellow card) 86' | Stadium: VEB Arena; Attendance: 9,390; Referee: Sergey Tsyganok |
| | Penalties |
| | Chalov (penalty missed); Zabolotnyi (penalty scored); Davila (penalty scored); Fayzullaev (penalty scored); Oblyakov (penalty missed) | | Makarchuk (penalty missed); Miguel (penalty scored); Margasov (penalty scored); Batyrev (penalty missed) |

| 4 October 2023 5 | Sochi | 1–2 | Orenburg | Sochi |
| 15:00 MSK (UTC+3) | Meshchaninov 17'; Angban (yellow card) 60'; Litvinov (yellow card) 66'; Anosov (yellow card) 90+7' | Report | Obukhov 27' (pen.); Marín 64'; Sivakow (red card) 89' | Stadium: Fisht Olympic Stadium; Attendance: 1,681; Referee: Pavel Shadykhanov |

| 1 November 2023 6 | Sochi | 2–0 | Fakel Voronezh | Sochi |
| 18:30 MSK (UTC+3) | Burmistrov 29'; Margasov 42' (yellow card) 83'; Litvinov (yellow card) 73'; Yurganov (yellow card) 90+3' | Report | Ivlev (yellow card) 18'; Mendel (yellow card) 51'; Bozhin (yellow card) 59' | Stadium: Fisht Olympic Stadium; Attendance: 6,757; Referee: Yevgeni Kukulyak |

==== Knockout stage ====
| 14 March 2024 Regions path QF 1st leg | SKA-Khabarovsk | 1–1 (4–2 p) | Sochi | Sochi |
| 15:30 KALT (UTC+2) | Podberyozkin (yellow card) 38'; Gongapshev 75' | Report | Guarirapa (yellow card) 8' (goal) 23'; Kravtsov (yellow card) 26'; Saavedra (yellow card) 90' | Stadium: Fisht Olympic Stadium; Attendance: 786; Referee: Roman Safyan |
| | Penalties |
| | Kozhemyakin (penalty missed); Petrov (penalty scored); Konovalov (penalty scored); Aliyev (penalty scored); K. Nikitin (penalty scored) | | Kramarič (penalty missed); Córdova (penalty missed); Attiyat Allah (penalty scored); Margasov (penalty scored) |

== Squad statistics ==
As of match played 25 May 2024

=== Appearances and goals ===
| No. | Pos | Nat | Player | Total | | Premier League | | Russian Cup | |
| No. | Pos | Nat | Player | Apps | Goals | Apps | Goals | Apps | Goals |
|---|---|---|---|---|---|---|---|---|---|
| 1 | GK | (Russia) RUS | Maksim Rudakov | 5 | 0 | 4 | 0 | 1 | 0 |
| 2 | DF | (Russia) RUS | Dmitri Chistyakov | 7 | 0 | 3+3 | 0 | 1 | 0 |
| 3 | DF | (Slovenia) SLO | Vanja Drkušić | 24 | 2 | 22+1 | 2 | 1 | 0 |
| 4 | DF | (Russia) RUS | Vyacheslav Litvinov | 25 | 0 | 12+9 | 0 | 4 | 0 |
| 5 | MF | (Ivory Coast) CIV | Victorien Angban | 11 | 0 | 0+7 | 0 | 3+1 | 0 |
| 6 | MF | (Russia) RUS | Artur Yusupov | 27 | 1 | 18+5 | 1 | 2+2 | 0 |
| 7 | FW | (Slovenia) SLO | Martin Kramarič | 27 | 5 | 22 | 5 | 2+3 | 0 |
| 10 | FW | (Venezuela) VEN | Sergio Córdova | 11 | 0 | 5+5 | 0 | 0+1 | 0 |
| 12 | GK | (Russia) RUS | Nikolai Zabolotny | 21 | 0 | 19 | 0 | 2 | 0 |
| 13 | GK | (Russia) RUS | Nikita Goylo | 10 | 0 | 6 | 0 | 4 | 0 |
| 14 | MF | (Russia) RUS | Kirill Kravtsov | 29 | 4 | 25+1 | 3 | 2+1 | 1 |
| 17 | DF | (Russia) RUS | Artyom Makarchuk | 30 | 0 | 23+5 | 0 | 1+1 | 0 |
| 18 | MF | (Russia) RUS | Nikita Burmistrov | 30 | 4 | 10+14 | 3 | 6 | 1 |
| 19 | MF | (Russia) RUS | Aleksei Sutormin | 10 | 2 | 7+3 | 2 | 0 | 0 |
| 21 | MF | (Chile) CHI | Ignacio Saavedra | 13 | 1 | 12 | 1 | 0+1 | 0 |
| 23 | FW | (Venezuela) VEN | Saúl Guarirapa | 11 | 9 | 9+1 | 8 | 1 | 1 |
| 24 | MF | (Brazil) BRA | Miguel Silveira | 30 | 2 | 6+18 | 1 | 5+1 | 1 |
| 25 | DF | (Morocco) MAR | Yahia Attiyat Allah | 11 | 1 | 5+5 | 1 | 1 | 0 |
| 27 | MF | (Russia) RUS | Kirill Zaika | 33 | 1 | 18+9 | 0 | 2+4 | 1 |
| 33 | DF | (Brazil) BRA | Marcelo Alves | 29 | 2 | 24+1 | 2 | 3+1 | 0 |
| 34 | DF | (Russia) RUS | Timofei Margasov | 25 | 1 | 10+10 | 0 | 5 | 1 |
| 35 | GK | (Russia) RUS | Aleksandr Dyogtev | 1 | 0 | 1 | 0 | 0 | 0 |
| 42 | DF | (Russia) RUS | Astemir Khezhev | 1 | 0 | 0+1 | 0 | 0 | 0 |
| 69 | MF | (Russia) RUS | Danil Anosov | 7 | 0 | 0+3 | 0 | 0+4 | 0 |
| 71 | DF | (Czech Republic) CZE | Jurij Medveděv | 16 | 1 | 3+9 | 1 | 4 | 0 |
| 73 | MF | (Russia) RUS | David Kirakosyan | 1 | 0 | 0 | 0 | 0+1 | 0 |
| 77 | MF | (Austria) AUT | Aleksandar Jukić | 13 | 1 | 12 | 1 | 0+1 | 0 |
Players away from the club on loan:
| 8 | MF | (Canada) CAN | Amir Batyrev | 18 | 0 | 6+6 | 0 | 4+2 | 0 |
| 15 | DF | (Nigeria) NGR | Solomon Agbalaka | 2 | 0 | 1 | 0 | 1 | 0 |
| 19 | MF | (Russia) RUS | Timofey Shipunov | 4 | 0 | 1+1 | 0 | 1+1 | 0 |
| 53 | MF | (Russia) RUS | Aleksandr Deryugin | 1 | 0 | 0 | 0 | 1 | 0 |
Players who appeared for Sochi but left during the season:
| 9 | FW | (Russia) RUS | Georgi Melkadze | 11 | 0 | 5+3 | 0 | 2+1 | 0 |
| 10 | FW | (Russia) RUS | Ivan Ignatyev | 18 | 2 | 5+7 | 2 | 2+4 | 0 |
| 11 | FW | (Montenegro) MNE | Luka Đorđević | 14 | 2 | 8+3 | 2 | 2+1 | 0 |
| 16 | MF | (Ecuador) ECU | Christian Noboa | 14 | 3 | 8+3 | 2 | 3 | 1 |
| 20 | DF | (Russia) RUS | Igor Yurganov | 10 | 0 | 4+1 | 0 | 4+1 | 0 |
| 26 | DF | (Russia) RUS | Artyom Meshchaninov | 7 | 1 | 1+1 | 0 | 5 | 1 |
| 45 | DF | (Serbia) SRB | Ivan Miladinović | 21 | 0 | 15+2 | 0 | 2+2 | 0 |
| 99 | FW | (Ecuador) ECU | Alejandro Cabeza | 1 | 0 | 0+1 | 0 | 0 | 0 |

=== Goal scorers ===
| Place | Position | Nation | Number | Name | Premier League | Russian Cup | Total |
|---|---|---|---|---|---|---|---|
| 1 | FW | (Venezuela) | 23 | Saúl Guarirapa | 8 | 1 | 9 |
| 2 | MF | (Slovenia) | 7 | Martin Kramarič | 5 | 0 | 5 |
| 3 | MF | (Russia) | 14 | Kirill Kravtsov | 3 | 1 | 4 |
| 3 | MF | (Russia) | 18 | Nikita Burmistrov | 3 | 1 | 4 |
| 5 | MF | (Ecuador) | 16 | Christian Noboa | 2 | 1 | 3 |
| 6 | FW | (Montenegro) | 11 | Luka Đorđević | 2 | 0 | 2 |
| 6 | DF | (Slovenia) | 3 | Vanja Drkušić | 2 | 0 | 2 |
| 6 | FW | (Russia) | 10 | Ivan Ignatyev | 2 | 0 | 2 |
| 6 | DF | (Brazil) | 33 | Marcelo Alves | 2 | 0 | 2 |
| 6 | MF | (Russia) | 19 | Aleksei Sutormin | 2 | 0 | 2 |
| 6 | MF | (Brazil) | 24 | Miguel Silveira | 1 | 1 | 2 |
| 12 | DF | (Czech Republic) | 71 | Jurij Medveděv | 1 | 0 | 1 |
| 12 | MF | (Russia) | 6 | Artur Yusupov | 1 | 0 | 1 |
| 12 | DF | (Morocco) | 25 | Yahia Attiyat Allah | 1 | 0 | 1 |
| 12 | MF | (Austria) | 77 | Aleksandar Jukić | 1 | 0 | 1 |
| 12 | MF | (Chile) | 21 | Ignacio Saavedra | 1 | 0 | 1 |
| 12 | MF | (Russia) | 27 | Kirill Zaika | 0 | 1 | 1 |
| 12 | DF | (Russia) | 26 | Artyom Meshchaninov | 0 | 1 | 1 |
| 12 | MF | (Russia) | 34 | Timofei Margasov | 0 | 1 | 1 |
| Total | | | | | 37 | 8 | 45 |

=== Clean sheets ===
| Place | Position | Nation | Number | Name | Premier League | Russian Cup | Total |
|---|---|---|---|---|---|---|---|
| 1 | GK | (Russia) | 12 | Nikolai Zabolotny | 4 | 1 | 5 |
| 2 | GK | (Russia) | 1 | Maksim Rudakov | 1 | 0 | 1 |
| 2 | GK | (Russia) | 13 | Nikita Goylo | 0 | 1 | 1 |
| Total | | | | | 5 | 2 | 7 |

=== Disciplinary record ===
| Number | Nation | Position | Name | Premier League | | Russian Cup | | Total | |
| Number | Nation | Position | Name | Yellow card | Red card | Yellow card | Red card | Yellow card | Red card |
|---|---|---|---|---|---|---|---|---|---|
| 2 | (Russia) | DF | Dmitri Chistyakov | 2 | 0 | 0 | 0 | 2 | 0 |
| 3 | (Slovenia) | DF | Vanja Drkušić | 3 | 0 | 0 | 0 | 3 | 0 |
| 4 | (Russia) | DF | Vyacheslav Litvinov | 3 | 0 | 2 | 0 | 5 | 0 |
| 5 | (Ivory Coast) | MF | Victorien Angban | 0 | 0 | 2 | 0 | 2 | 0 |
| 6 | (Russia) | MF | Artur Yusupov | 4 | 0 | 0 | 0 | 4 | 0 |
| 7 | (Slovenia) | FW | Martin Kramarič | 2 | 0 | 0 | 0 | 2 | 0 |
| 10 | (Venezuela) | FW | Sergio Córdova | 2 | 1 | 0 | 0 | 2 | 1 |
| 12 | (Russia) | GK | Nikolai Zabolotny | 2 | 0 | 0 | 0 | 2 | 0 |
| 14 | (Russia) | MF | Kirill Kravtsov | 5 | 1 | 3 | 0 | 8 | 1 |
| 17 | (Russia) | DF | Artyom Makarchuk | 1 | 0 | 0 | 0 | 1 | 0 |
| 18 | (Russia) | MF | Nikita Burmistrov | 3 | 0 | 1 | 0 | 4 | 0 |
| 19 | (Russia) | MF | Timofey Shipunov | 0 | 0 | 1 | 0 | 1 | 0 |
| 21 | (Chile) | MF | Ignacio Saavedra | 3 | 0 | 1 | 0 | 4 | 0 |
| 23 | (Venezuela) | FW | Saúl Guarirapa | 2 | 0 | 1 | 0 | 3 | 0 |
| 24 | (Brazil) | MF | Miguel Silveira | 1 | 0 | 0 | 0 | 1 | 0 |
| 27 | (Russia) | MF | Kirill Zaika | 6 | 0 | 0 | 0 | 6 | 0 |
| 33 | (Brazil) | DF | Marcelo Alves | 7 | 2 | 0 | 0 | 7 | 2 |
| 34 | (Russia) | DF | Timofei Margasov | 0 | 0 | 1 | 0 | 1 | 0 |
| 69 | (Russia) | MF | Danil Anosov | 0 | 0 | 1 | 0 | 1 | 0 |
| 71 | (Czech Republic) | DF | Jurij Medveděv | 1 | 0 | 1 | 0 | 2 | 0 |
Players away on loan:
| 8 | (Canada) | MF | Amir Batyrev | 2 | 0 | 1 | 0 | 3 | 0 |
Players who left Sochi during the season:
| 9 | (Russia) | FW | Georgi Melkadze | 1 | 0 | 0 | 0 | 1 | 0 |
| 10 | (Russia) | FW | Ivan Ignatyev | 1 | 0 | 0 | 0 | 1 | 0 |
| 11 | (Montenegro) | FW | Luka Đorđević | 4 | 0 | 0 | 0 | 4 | 0 |
| 16 | (Ecuador) | MF | Christian Noboa | 3 | 0 | 0 | 0 | 3 | 0 |
| 20 | (Russia) | DF | Igor Yurganov | 1 | 0 | 1 | 0 | 2 | 0 |
| 45 | (Serbia) | DF | Ivan Miladinović | 2 | 0 | 0 | 0 | 2 | 0 |
| Total | | | | 61 | 4 | 16 | 0 | 77 | 4 |
