= 2024–25 PFC Sochi season =

PFC Sochi
2024–25 season
- Manager: Robert Moreno
- Stadium: Fisht Olympic Stadium
- Russian First League: 10th
- Russian Cup: Pre-season
- Highest home attendance: 5,796 vs Baltika Kaliningrad
- Lowest home attendance: 5,633 vs SKA-Khabarovsk
- Biggest defeat: Ural Yekaterinburg 2–0 Sochi; Sochi 1–2 SKA-Khabarovsk

The 2024–25 season is the 7th season in the history of PFC Sochi, and the club's first season in Russian First League since 2018–19. In addition to the domestic league, the team is scheduled to participate in the Russian Cup.

== Transfers ==
=== In ===
Pos.	Player	Transferred from	Fee	Date	Source
MF	(Armenia) Hovhannes Harutyunyan	(Armenia) Pyunik	Loan	30 June 2024	
DF	(Russia) Ruslan Shagiakhmetov	(Russia) Dynamo Moscow 2	Undisclosed	1 July 2024	
MF	(Russia) Vladislav Lazarev	(Russia) Baltika Kaliningrad	Loan	1 July 2024	
DF	(Russia) Oleg Kozhemyakin	(Russia) SKA-Khabarovsk	Free	1 July 2024	

=== Out ===
Pos.	Player	Transferred to	Fee	Date	Source
MF	(Russia) Timofey Margasov	(Russia) Ural Yekaterinburg	End of contract	1 July 2024	
MF	(Armenia) Hovhannes Harutyunyan	Ararat-Armenia	Loan	1 July 2024	
GK	(Russia) Timofey Kashintsev	(Russia) Arsenal Tula	Undisclosed	10 July 2024	

== Friendlies ==
=== Pre-season ===
1 July 2024 Friendly	Leningradets (Russia)	1–1	(Russia) Sochi
16:00	Fyodorov 16'; (red card) 90+3'		Rozmanov 58'

2 July 2024 Friendly tournament	Zenit Saint Petersburg (Russia)	5–2	(Russia) Sochi	Saint Petersburg
16:00	Wendel (yellow card) 14'; Cassierra 20', 24'; Mostovoy 45+1'; Rodrigão (yellow card) 60'; Yerokhin 67'; Mantuan 69'; Sutormin (yellow card) 85'		Marcelo Alves 32'; Zaika 42'	Stadium: Gazprom Arena

5 July 2024 Friendly tournament	Red Star Belgrade (Serbia)	2–0	(Russia) Sochi	Saint Petersburg
12:00 UTC+3	Ndiaye 39'; Jovanović 44'			Stadium: Krestovsky Stadium

8 July 2024 Friendly tournament	Sochi (Russia)	5–0	(Argentina) Talleres Córdoba	Saint Petersburg
13:00 UTC+3	Kramarič 30'; Safronov 60'; Zaika 81'; Levin 88'; Bart 90+2'			Stadium: Krestovsky Stadium

== Competitions ==
=== Overall record ===
Competition	First match	Last match	Starting round	Record							
Competition	First match	Last match	Starting round	Pld	W	D	L	GF	GA	GD	Win %
Russian First League	14 July 2024		Matchday 1	4	1	1	2	4	5	−1	25.00
Russian Cup				0	0	0	0	0	0	+0	—
Total				4	1	1	2	4	5	−1	25.00

Last updated: 4 August 2024
Source: Soccerway

=== Russian First League ===
==== League table ====
Pos	Team	Pld	W	D	L	GF	GA	GD	Pts	Promotion, qualification or relegation
3	Chernomorets Novorossiysk (Note: Chernomorets was not issued the 2025–26 RPL license and was replaced in the play-offs by Sochi.)	34	19	7	8	51	34	+17	64	
4	Ural Yekaterinburg	34	16	11	7	50	38	+12	59	Qualification to Premier League play-offs
5	Sochi (O, P)	34	16	9	9	55	34	+21	57	Qualification to Premier League play-offs
6	SKA-Khabarovsk	34	15	8	11	44	41	+3	53	
7	Rodina Moscow	34	13	11	10	41	31	+10	50	

Source: Soccerway
Rules for classification: 1) Points; 2) Head-to-head points; 3) Head-to-head matches won; 4) Head-to-head goal difference; 5) Head-to-head goals scored; 6) Head-to-head away goals scored; 7) Matches won; 8) Goal difference; 9) Goals scored; 10) Away matches won; 11) Away goals scored; 12) Best disciplinary record (3 points for red card, 1 point for yellow card); 13) Drawing lots. If teams tied on points did not play an equal number of head-to-head games, head-to-head criteria and disciplinary record are not used for positioning. If 1st- and 2nd-placed teams are tied in the final standings on the first 12 criteria, a winner is determined in an additional play-off game, with no extra time and a penalty-shootout if tied at the end of regulation, instead of drawing lots.
(O) Play-off winners; (P) Promoted

==== Results summary ====
Overall								Home						Away					
Pld	W	D	L	GF	GA	GD	Pts	W	D	L	GF	GA	GD	W	D	L	GF	GA	GD
4	1	1	2	4	5	−1	4	0	1	1	2	3	−1	1	0	1	2	2	0

Last updated: 4 August 2024.

==== Results by round ====
Round	1	2	3	4
Ground	A	H	H	A
Result	L	D	L	W
Position	16	14	16	

Updated to match(es) played on 4 August 2024. Source:
A = Away; H = Home; W = Win; D = Draw; L = Loss

==== Matches ====
The tentative match schedule was released on 27 June.

14 July 2024 1	Ural Yekaterinburg	2–0	Sochi	Yekaterinburg
16:00 UTC+3	Kashtanov 49'; Ayupov 58'; Ishkov (yellow card) 81'; Chudin (yellow card) 90'		Burmistrov (yellow card) 30'; Saavedra (yellow card) 76'	Stadium: Central Stadium; Attendance: 10,616; Referee: Ivan Saraev

21 July 2024 2	Sochi	1–1	Baltika Kaliningrad	Sochi
19:00 UTC+3	Marcelo Alves (yellow card) 12'; Bart 32'; Guarirapa (yellow card) 37'		Gassama (yellow card) 30'; Malyarov 68'; Pryakhin (yellow card) 84'	Stadium: Fisht Olympic Stadium; Attendance: 5,796; Referee: Ivan Abrosimov

28 July 2024 3	Sochi	1–2	SKA-Khabarovsk	Sochi
19:00 UTC+3	Kozhemyakin 90'		Gongadze 43'; Aliyev 79'	Stadium: Fisht Olympic Stadium; Attendance: 5,633; Referee: Vladimir Falov

4 August 2024 4	Shinnik Yaroslavl	0–2	Sochi	Yaroslavl
17:30 UTC+3			Marcelo Alves 18' (pen.); Bart 54'	Stadium: Shinnik Stadium; Attendance: 2,501; Referee: Anton Frolov

10 August 2024 5	Sochi	2–1	Chernomorets	Sochi
19:30 UTC+3	Guarirapa 5' (yellow card) 75'; Bart 8'; Litvinov (yellow card) 53'; Kramarič (yellow card) 65'; Marcelo Alves (yellow card) 86'	Report	Uridia (yellow card) 4'; Stezhko (yellow card) 23'; Okladnikov 37'; Khabalov (yellow card) 39'	Stadium: Fisht Olympic Stadium; Attendance: 5,816; Referee: (Russia) Ivan Sidenkov

18 August 2024 6	Yenisey	1–0	Sochi	Krasnoyarsk
10:00 UTC+3	Savelyev 10' (yellow card) 68'; Shiryayev (yellow card) 24'; Grigoryev (yellow card) 29'; Gilyazetdinov (yellow card) 75'	Report	Zaika (yellow card) 50' (yellow-red card) 90'; Saavedra (yellow card) 69'	Stadium: Central Stadium; Attendance: 4,816; Referee: (Russia) Kirill Silantyev

25 August 2024 7	Ufa	3–4	Sochi	Ufa
12:00 UTC+3	Migran Ageyan 34'; Adayev 38'; Lozhkin 44'	Report	Pisarsky 3'; Kozhemyakin 62'; Kramarič 85' (yellow card) 90+2' (goal) 90+4'	Stadium: Neftyanik Stadium; Attendance: 2,530; Referee: (Russia) Ivan Saraev

1 September 2024 8	Sochi	3–0	Tyumen	Sochi
19:00 UTC+3	Kramarič (yellow card) 45' (goal) 88'; Pisarsky 45+2' 71'; Bart (yellow card) 85'	Report	Khramtsov (yellow card) 14'; Klyonkin (yellow card) 50'; Karpov (yellow card) 55'; Korotayev (yellow card) 77'; Olivier Kenfack (yellow card) 90'	Stadium: Fisht Olympic Stadium; Attendance: 4,964; Referee: (Russia) Anatoliy Zhabchenko

7 September 2024 9	Alania Vladikavkaz	1–1	Sochi	Grozny
17:00 UTC+3	Abdokov 29'; Tatayev (yellow card) 65'; Williams Chimezie Oluebube (yellow card) 90+3'	Report	Kramarič 9'	Stadium: Sultan Bilimkhanov Stadium; Attendance: 567; Referee: (Russia) Ivan Abrosimov

14 September 2024 10	Sochi	0–0	Rotor Volgograd	Sochi
19:00 UTC+3		Report	Shumskikh (yellow card) 65'	Stadium: Fisht Olympic Stadium; Attendance: 4,377; Referee: (Russia) Anton Frolov

21 September 2024 11	Sokol Saratov	1–1	Sochi	Saratov
15:00 UTC+3	Molodtsov (yellow card) 42'; Samko 68'	Report	Marcelo Alves 62' (yellow card) 79'; Safronov (red card) 86'; Burmistrov (yellow card) 90+3'	Stadium: Lokomotiv Stadium; Attendance: 4,120; Referee: (Russia) Igor Panin

29 September 2024 12	Torpedo Moscow	2–2	Sochi	Khimki
17:00 UTC+3	Borodin (yellow card) 36'; Chervyakov (yellow card) 78'; Gorbunov 83'; Maksimov 89'; Danilkin (yellow card) 90+4'; Roganović (yellow card) 90+6'	Report	Kramarič 45+2'; Suslov (yellow card) 68'; Melyoshin 90+1'	Stadium: Arena Khimki; Attendance: 1,132; Referee: (Russia) Yuriy Karpov

6 October 2024 13	Sochi	5–0	Chayka Peschanokopskoye	Sochi
19:00 UTC+3	Pisarsky 6' (yellow card) 41'; Saavedra (yellow card) 25'; Kramarič 39'; Suslov (yellow card) 52'; Melyoshin 80'; Magal 82'; Kravtsov 85'	Report	Malyarov (yellow card) 40'	Stadium: Fisht Olympic Stadium; Attendance: 3,435; Referee: (Russia) Nikolay Voloshin

=== Russian Cup ===
24 September 2024 Round 4	Kuban-Holding Pavlovskaya	0-5	Sochi	Pavlovskaya
14:00	Rodislav Trefilov (yellow card) 36'; Atsamaz Revazov (yellow card) 55'; Andrey Maloletov (yellow card) 65'	Report	Melyoshin 39' 78'; Bart 56' (yellow card) 61' (goal) 64'; Safronov 70'; Ruslan Shagiakhmetov (yellow card) 75'	Stadium: Urozhay Stadium; Attendance: 1,800; Referee: Andrey Prokopov

16 October 2024 Round 5	Sochi	2-0	Volga	Sochi
19:30	Solodarenko 34' (o.g.); Ruslan Shagiakhmetov (yellow card) 38'; Chirkov (yellow card) 74'; Bart 89'	Report	Voronin (yellow card) 75'; Valeriy Chupin (yellow card) 80'	Stadium: Fisht Olympic Stadium; Attendance: 2,695; Referee: Danil Kashirin

30 October 2024 Round 6	Sochi	2-2 (a.e.t.) (4-2 p)	Spartak Kostroma	Sochi
19:00	Shushenachev 17'; Kravtsov (yellow card) 64' (goal) 70'	Report	Sadov 49'; Genchu (yellow card) 73'; Ilya Rubtsov 90+1' (yellow card) 90+2'	Stadium: Fisht Olympic Stadium; Attendance: 4,533; Referee: Oleg Sokolov

27 November 2024 Regions Path Quarter Finals	Sochi	1-1 (a.e.t.) (3-4 p)	Dynamo Makhachkala	Sochi
17:15	Shushenachev 45'; Suslov (red card) 85'	Report	Đapo 70'	Stadium: Fisht Olympic Stadium; Attendance: 2,456; Referee: Ivan Abrosimov
