= Makar Chirkov =

Russian footballer

Personal information
- Full name: Makar Kirillovich Chirkov
- Date of birth: 28 January 2005 (age 21)
- Height: 1.86 m (6 ft 1 in)
- Position: Defender

Team information
- Current team: SKA-Khabarovsk (on loan from Sochi)
- Number: 37

Youth career
- 2010–2017: CSKA Moscow
- 2017–2023: Lokomotiv Moscow
- 2023–2024: Sochi

Senior career*
Years	Team	Apps	(Gls)
2024–	Sochi	3	(0)
2025	→ Alania Vladikavkaz (loan)	11	(0)
2025–2026	→ SKA-Khabarovsk (loan)	2	(1)
2026–	→ SKA-Khabarovsk (loan)	0	(0)
- * Club domestic league appearances and goals as of 29 November 2025

Makar Kirillovich Chirkov (Russian: Макар Кириллович Чирков; born 28 January 2005) is a Russian footballer who plays as a defender for SKA-Khabarovsk on loan from Sochi.

== Club career ==
Chirkov made his Russian First League debut for Sochi on 22 November 2024 in a game against Ufa.

He made his Russian Premier League debut for Sochi on 19 July 2025 in a game against Lokomotiv Moscow.

On 11 September 2025, Chirkov was loaned to SKA-Khabarovsk. Chirkov suffered an ACL tear early into the loan term, and the loan was terminated early on 12 January 2026.

== Career statistics ==
As of 29 November 2025

Club	Season	League			Cup		Total	
Club	Season	Division	Apps	Goals	Apps	Goals	Apps	Goals
Sochi	2023–24	Russian Premier League	0	0	0	0	0	0
Sochi	2024–25	Russian First League	1	0	4	0	5	0
Sochi	2025–26	Russian Premier League	2	0	3	2	5	2
Sochi	Total		3	0	7	2	10	2
Alania Vladikavkaz (loan)	2024–25	Russian First League	11	0	0	0	11	0
SKA-Khabarovsk (loan)	2025–26	Russian First League	2	1	1	0	3	1
Career total			16	1	8	2	24	3
