= 2024–25 FC Alania Vladikavkaz season =

FC Alania Vladikavkaz
2024–25 season
- Stadium: Republican Spartak Stadium
- Russian First League: 6th
- Russian Cup: Pre-season

The 2024–25 season is the 104th season in the history of FC Alania Vladikavkaz, and the club's fifth consecutive season in Russian First League. In addition to the domestic league, the team is scheduled to participate in the Russian Cup.

== Transfers ==
=== In ===
Pos.	Player	Transferred from	Fee	Date	Source
DF	(Russia) Aleksandr Korotkov	(Russia) Arsenal Tula	Loan return	30 June 2024	
DF	(Russia) Sergei Makarov	(Russia) Akron Tolyatti	Free	1 July 2024	

=== Out ===
Pos.	Player	Transferred from	Fee	Date	Source
MF	(Russia) Alan Khabalov	(Russia) Chernomorets Novorossiysk	Undisclosed	10 July 2024	

== Friendlies ==
=== Pre-season ===
24 June 2024 Friendly	Chertanovo (Russia)	v	(Russia) Alania Vladikavkaz
Note: The match was cancelled.

30 June 2024 Friendly	Alania Vladikavkaz (Russia)	0–0	(Russia) FC Ufa
12:30			(penalty missed) 58'
Note: 2 x 40 minutes.

30 June 2024 Friendly	Chelyabinsk (Russia)	0–0	(Russia) Alania Vladikavkaz
18:00

6 July 2024 Friendly	Torpedo Moscow (Russia)	2–2	(Russia) Alania Vladikavkaz
13:00	Netfullin 6'; Shamkin 54'		Kokoyev 11'; Khadartsev 35' (pen.)

7 July 2024 Friendly	Neftekhimik Nizhnekamsk (Russia)	1–0	(Russia) Alania Vladikavkaz
11:00	Petrov 53'		(red card) 56'

== Competitions ==
=== Overall record ===
Competition	First match	Last match	Starting round	Record							
Competition	First match	Last match	Starting round	Pld	W	D	L	GF	GA	GD	Win %
Russian First League	15 July 2024		Matchday 1	5	2	1	2	4	2	+2	40.00
Russian Cup				0	0	0	0	0	0	+0	—
Total				5	2	1	2	4	2	+2	40.00

Last updated: 10 August 2024
Source: Soccerway

=== Russian First League ===
==== League table ====
Pos	Team	Pld	W	D	L	GF	GA	GD	Pts	Promotion, qualification or relegation
14	Shinnik Yaroslavl	34	8	11	15	24	42	−18	35 (Note: Ranked on head-to-head goal difference (Shinnik +1, Ufa –1))	
15	Ufa	34	9	8	17	32	48	−16	35	
16	Sokol Saratov (Note: Sokol was not relegated despite finishing in the relegation spot, as Khimki which was administratively relegated from Premier League to the First League was later dissolved, with Sokol replacing them in the First League)	34	7	11	16	25	41	−16	32	
17	Alania Vladikavkaz (R)	34	6	9	19	24	50	−26	27 (Note: Ranked on head-to-head points (Alania 4, Tyumen 1))	Relegation to Second League
18	Tyumen (R)	34	7	6	21	30	51	−21	27	Relegation to Second League

Source: Soccerway
Rules for classification: 1) Points; 2) Head-to-head points; 3) Head-to-head matches won; 4) Head-to-head goal difference; 5) Head-to-head goals scored; 6) Head-to-head away goals scored; 7) Matches won; 8) Goal difference; 9) Goals scored; 10) Away matches won; 11) Away goals scored; 12) Best disciplinary record (3 points for red card, 1 point for yellow card); 13) Drawing lots. If teams tied on points did not play an equal number of head-to-head games, head-to-head criteria and disciplinary record are not used for positioning. If 1st- and 2nd-placed teams are tied in the final standings on the first 12 criteria, a winner is determined in an additional play-off game, with no extra time and a penalty-shootout if tied at the end of regulation, instead of drawing lots.
(R) Relegated

==== Results summary ====
Overall								Home						Away					
Pld	W	D	L	GF	GA	GD	Pts	W	D	L	GF	GA	GD	W	D	L	GF	GA	GD
5	2	1	2	4	2	+2	7	0	1	2	0	2	−2	2	0	0	4	0	+4

Last updated: 10 August 2024.

==== Results by round ====
Round	1	2	3	4	5
Ground	H	A	H	A	H
Result	D	W	L	W	L
Position	11				

Updated to match(es) played on 10 August 2024. Source:
A = Away; H = Home; W = Win; D = Draw; L = Loss

==== Matches ====
The tentative match schedule was released on 27 June.

15 July 2024 1	Alania Vladikavkaz	0–0	Ufa	Grozny
19:30 UTC+3				Stadium: Akhmat-Arena; Attendance: 365; Referee: Igor Panin

21 July 2024 2	Tyumen	0–1	Alania Vladikavkaz	Tyumen
12:30 UTC+3			Gagloev 90+3'	Stadium: Geolog Stadium; Attendance: 3,413; Referee: Kirill Silantyev

28 July 2024 3	Alania Vladikavkaz	0–1	Rodina Moscow	Grozny
19:30 UTC+3			Gordyushenko 71'	Stadium: Sultan Bilimkhanov Stadium; Attendance: 586; Referee: Inal Tanashev

3 August 2024 4	SKA-Khabarovsk	0–3	Alania Vladikavkaz	Ramenskoye
16:00 UTC+3			Gagloev 21'; Dolgov 35', 60'	Stadium: Saturn Stadium; Attendance: 337; Referee: Ivan Saraev

10 August 2024 5	Alania Vladikavkaz	0–1	Yenisey Krasnoyarsk	Grozny
19:00 UTC+3			Gilyazetdinov 59'	Stadium: Sultan Bilimkhanov Stadium; Attendance: 670; Referee: Anton Anopa
