= Vladimir Pisarsky =

Russian footballer

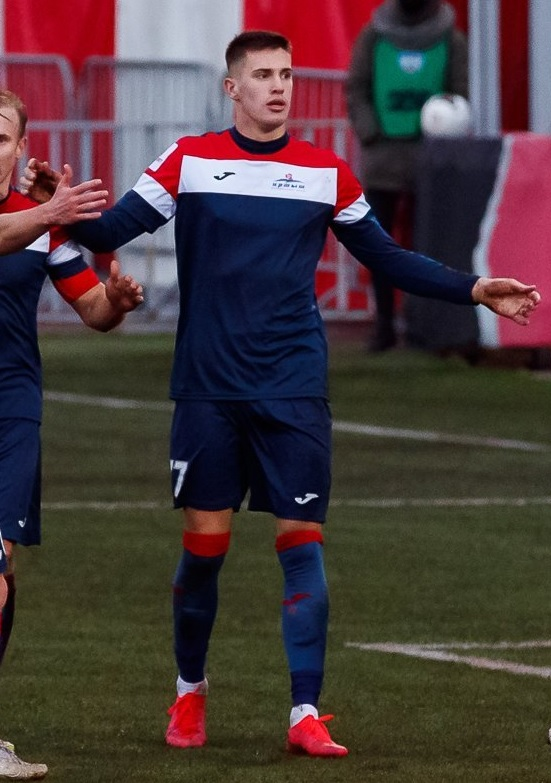
- Pisarsky with Irtysh Omsk in 2020

Personal information
- Full name: Vladimir Vasilyevich Pisarsky
- Birth name: Vladimir Aleksandrovich Sychevoy
- Date of birth: 27 February 1996 (age 30)
- Place of birth: Krasnoperekopsk, Ukraine
- Height: 1.88 m (6 ft 2 in)
- Position: Centre-forward

Team information
- Current team: SKA Rostov-on-Don (amateur)

Youth career
- 2010–2013: UOR Simferopol

Senior career*
Years	Team	Apps	(Gls)
2016–2020	Krymteplytsia Molodizhne (KFS)		
2020–2021	Irtysh Omsk	25	(5)
2021–2022	Orenburg	45	(20)
2022–2025	Krylia Sovetov Samara	30	(3)
2024–2025	→ Sochi (loan)	28	(6)
2025–	SKA Rostov-on-Don (amateur)		

International career^{‡}
2022	Russia	1	(0)
- * Club domestic league appearances and goals as of 24 August 2025 ‡ National team caps and goals as of 17 November 2022

Vladimir Vasilyevich Pisarsky (Russian: Владимир Васильевич Писарский; Ukrainian: Володимир Васильович Писарський; born Vladimir Aleksandrovich Sychevoy, Russian: Владимир Александрович Сычевой; Ukrainian: Володимир Олександрович Сичевий; 27 February 1996) is a footballer who plays as a centre-forward for amateur club SKA Rostov-on-Don. He is banned from playing in the 2025–26 season for betting. Born in Ukraine, he represents the Russia national team.

== Club career ==
On 13 October 2020, he made his debut in the Russian Football National League for Irtysh Omsk in a match against Akron Tolyatti.

On 16 July 2022, Pisarsky made his Russian Premier League debut for Orenburg in a match against Krylia Sovetov Samara. In his second RPL game a week later against Ural Yekaterinburg, he came on as a substitute at half-time and scored a hat-trick in a 3–0 victory. On 13 November, Pisarsky scored his second RPL hat-trick in a 5–1 victory over Krasnodar and went into the three-and-a-half month-long league winter break on top of the goalscoring table, tied with Quincy Promes at 14 goals. On 25 December, Pisarsky signed a three-and-a-half-year contract with Krylia Sovetov Samara.

On 16 August 2024, Pisarsky moved to Sochi on loan with an option to buy.

In July 2025, Pisarsky was banned from playing for four years (three of them suspended) for betting on Sochi games. It has not been proven that he influenced the outcome of those games. On 16 July 2025, Krylia Sovetov terminated his contract.

== International career ==
Pisarsky was called up to the Russia national football team for the first time in November 2022 for friendly matches against Tajikistan and Uzbekistan. He made his debut against Tajikistan on 17 November 2022.

== Personal life ==
He acquired citizenship of Russia in 2014 after the annexation of Crimea from Ukraine.

In December 2022, he changed his last name from Sychevoy (the surname of his biological father) to Pisarsky (the surname of his stepfather who raised him since his youth).

== Career statistics ==
=== Club ===
As of match played 31 May 2025

Appearances and goals by club, season and competition
Club	Season	League			Cup		Europe		Other		Total	
Club	Season	Division	Apps	Goals	Apps	Goals	Apps	Goals	Apps	Goals	Apps	Goals
Irtysh Omsk	2020–21	Russian First League	25	5	–		–		–		25	5
Orenburg	2021–22	Russian First League	30	6	2	1	–		2 (Note: Appearances in the promotion play-offs)	0	34	7
Orenburg	2022–23	Russian Premier League	15	14	4	3	–		–		19	17
Orenburg	Total		45	20	6	4	0	0	2	0	53	24
Krylia Sovetov Samara	2022–23	Russian Premier League	11	0	5	3	–		–		16	3
Krylia Sovetov Samara	2023–24	Russian Premier League	18	3	4	1	–		–		22	4
Krylia Sovetov Samara	2024–25	Russian Premier League	1	0	1	0	—		—		2	0
Krylia Sovetov Samara	Total		30	3	10	4	—		—		40	7
Sochi (loan)	2024–25	Russian First League	28	6	1	0	–		1	0	30	6
Career total			128	34	17	8	0	0	3	0	148	42

=== International ===
As of match played 17 November 2022

Appearances and goals by national team and year
National team	Year	Apps	Goals
Russia	2022	1	0
Total		1	0

== Honours ==
Individual

- Russian Premier League Player of the Month: October 2022
