= Denis Samoylov =

Russian footballer

Personal information
- Full name: Denis Andreyevich Samoylov
- Date of birth: 15 May 1999 (age 27)
- Place of birth: Krasnoyarsk, Russia
- Height: 1.82 m (5 ft 11 1/2 in)
- Position: Midfielder

Team information
- Current team: Chelyabinsk
- Number: 77

Youth career
- Yenisey Krasnoyarsk

Senior career*
Years	Team	Apps	(Gls)
2017–2018	Nosta Novotroitsk	26	(0)
2018	Tekstilshchik Ivanovo	4	(0)
2018	Yenisey Krasnoyarsk	0	(0)
2018–2019	Lada Dimitrovgrad (amateur)		
2019	Dolgoprudny	0	(0)
2020–2025	Yenisey Krasnoyarsk	56	(1)
2021–2024	→ Yenisey-2 Krasnoyarsk	18	(2)
2023–2024	→ Tyumen (loan)	30	(1)
2025–	Chelyabinsk	49	(1)
- * Club domestic league appearances and goals as of 16 May 2026

Denis Andreyevich Samoylov (Russian: Денис Андреевич Самойлов; born 15 May 1999) is a Russian football player who plays for Chelyabinsk.

== Club career ==
He made his debut in the Russian Football National League for Yenisey Krasnoyarsk on 12 August 2020 in a game against Neftekhimik Nizhnekamsk.
