= Solomon Agbalaka =

Nigerian footballer (born 2003)

Personal information
- Full name: Solomon Chinonso Agbalaka
- Date of birth: 9 November 2003 (age 23)
- Place of birth: Nigeria
- Height: 1.85 m (6 ft 1 in)
- Position: Left-back

Youth career
- –2022: Broad City

Senior career*
| Years | Team | Apps | (Gls) |
| 2022–2024 | Broad City | 0 | (0) |
| 2022–2023 | → MFM (loan) | 14 | (0) |
| 2023–2024 | → Sochi (loan) | 1 | (0) |
| 2024–2026 | Sochi | 0 | (0) |
| 2024 | → Iberia 1999 (loan) | 23 | (0) |

International career^{‡}
| 2023 | Nigeria U20 | 12 | (1) |
- * Club domestic league appearances and goals as of 11 December 2024 ‡ National team caps and goals as of 4 June 2023

Solomon Chinonso Agbalaka (born 9 November 2003) is a Nigerian football player who plays as a left-back.

== Club career ==
On 9 August 2023, Agbalaka signed with Russian Premier League club Sochi on loan. He made his RPL debut for Sochi on 16 September 2023 against Spartak Moscow. Agbalaka left Sochi by mutual consent on 19 January 2026.

== International career ==
Agbalaka represented Nigeria at the 2023 U-20 Africa Cup of Nations, where they finished third and he was selected to the Team of the Tournament. He then played in the 2023 FIFA U-20 World Cup, where Nigeria reached quarterfinals.

== Career statistics ==
As of 23 October 2025

| Club | Season | League | | | Cup | | Continental | | Other | | Total | |
| Club | Season | Division | Apps | Goals | Apps | Goals | Apps | Goals | Apps | Goals | Apps | Goals |
|---|---|---|---|---|---|---|---|---|---|---|---|---|
| MFM (loan) | 2021–22 | Nigeria Premier Football League | 14 | 0 | – | | – | | – | | 14 | 0 |
| Sochi (loan) | 2023–24 | Russian Premier League | 1 | 0 | 1 | 0 | – | | – | | 2 | 0 |
| Iberia 1999 (loan) | 2024 | Erovnuli Liga | 23 | 0 | 1 | 0 | 0 | 0 | 1 (Note: Appearance in Georgian Super Cup) | 0 | 25 | 0 |
| Sochi | 2025–26 | Russian Premier League | 0 | 0 | 4 | 0 | – | | – | | 4 | 0 |
| Career total | | | 38 | 0 | 6 | 0 | 0 | 0 | 1 | 0 | 45 | 0 |
