= Aleksei Berdnikov =

Russian footballer

Personal information
- Full name: Aleksei Andreyevich Berdnikov
- Date of birth: 30 March 1996 (age 30)
- Place of birth: Stavropol, Russia
- Height: 1.76 m (5 ft 9 in)
- Position: Right-back

Team information
- Current team: FC Chelyabinsk
- Number: 21

Senior career*
Years	Team	Apps	(Gls)
2014–2015	FC Dynamo GTS Stavropol	4	(0)
2015–2016	FC Dynamo Stavropol	12	(0)
2016	FC Mordovia Saransk	0	(0)
2017	FC Zenit Penza	7	(0)
2017–2021	FC Volgar Astrakhan	81	(3)
2021–2024	FC Neftekhimik Nizhnekamsk	86	(0)
2024–2026	FC Arsenal Tula	47	(0)
2026–	FC Chelyabinsk	10	(0)
- * Club domestic league appearances and goals as of 16 May 2026

Aleksei Andreyevich Berdnikov (Russian: Алексей Андреевич Бердников; born 30 March 1996) is a Russian football player who plays for FC Chelyabinsk.

== Club career ==
He made his professional debut in the Russian Professional Football League for FC Dynamo GTS Stavropol on 20 August 2014 in a game against FC Astrakhan. He made his Russian Football National League debut for FC Volgar Astrakhan on 16 September 2017 in a game against FC Orenburg.
