= Aleksandr Bem =

Russian football player

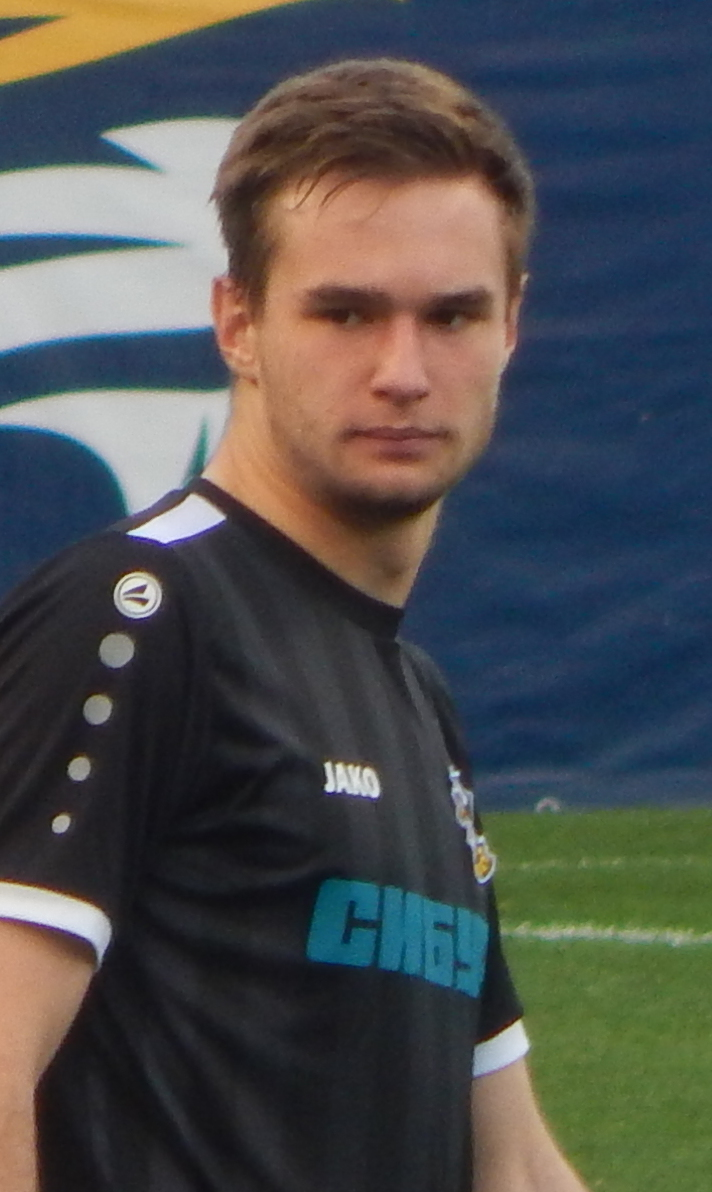
- Aleksandr Bem in 2019.

Personal information
- Full name: Aleksandr Sergeyevich Bem
- Date of birth: 19 April 2001 (age 25)
- Height: 1.79 m (5 ft 10 in)
- Position: Defender

Team information
- Current team: FC Chelyabinsk
- Number: 72

Senior career*
Years	Team	Apps	(Gls)
2018–2026	FC Tyumen	186	(9)
2026–	FC Chelyabinsk	0	(0)

International career^{‡}
2016	Russia U16	2	(0)
2019	Russia U18	5	(0)
- * Club domestic league appearances and goals as of 14 June 2026 ‡ National team caps and goals as of 14 June 2019

Aleksandr Sergeyevich Bem (Russian: Александр Сергеевич Бем; born 19 April 2001) is a Russian football player who plays for FC Chelyabinsk.

== Club career ==
He made his debut in the Russian Football National League for FC Tyumen on 3 March 2019 in a game against FC Sibir Novosibirsk, as a 52nd minute substitute for Mikhail Kovalenko.
