= Aleksandr Dyogtev =

Russian footballer (born 2005)

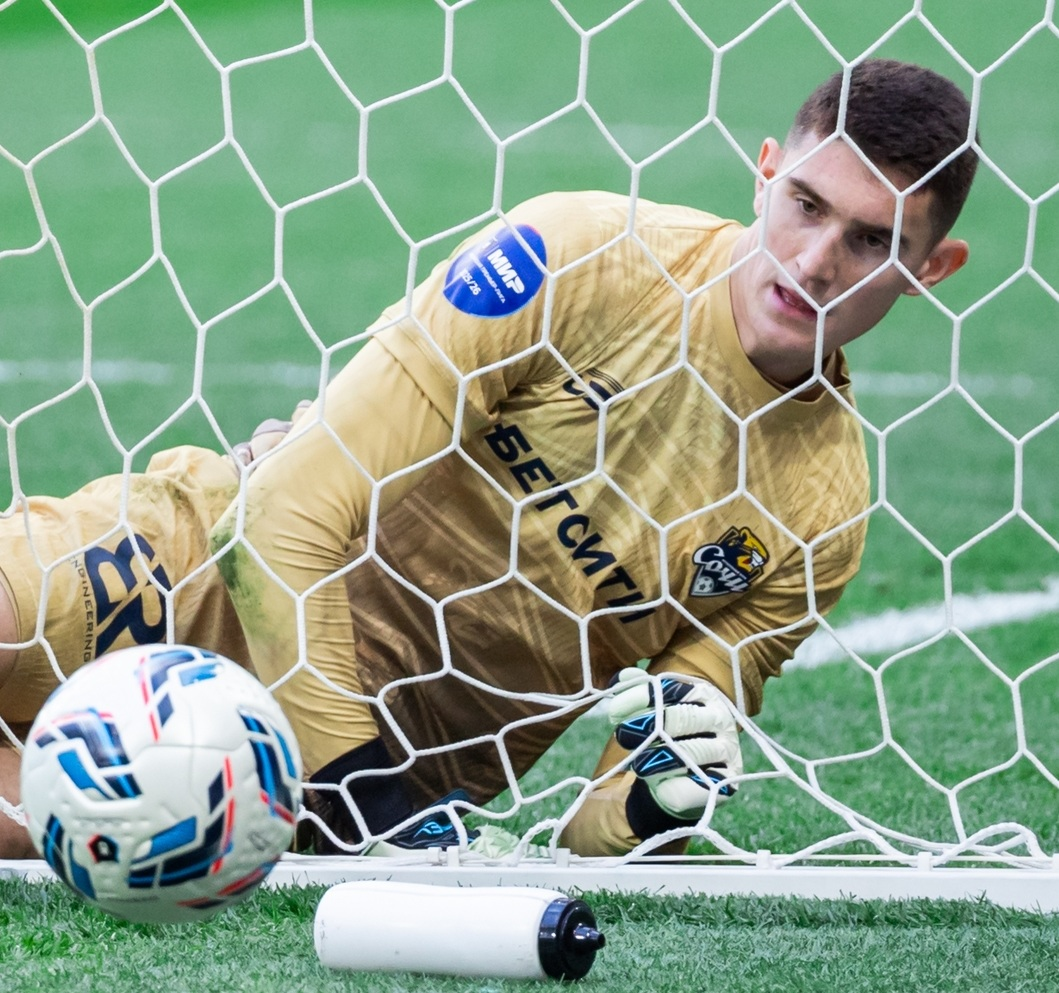
- Dyogtev with Sochi in 2026

Personal information
- Full name: Aleksandr Ruslanovich Dyogtev
- Date of birth: 27 April 2005 (age 21)
- Place of birth: Nakhodka, Russia
- Height: 1.95 m (6 ft 5 in)
- Position: Goalkeeper

Team information
- Current team: Orenburg (on loan from Zenit Saint Petersburg)
- Number: 35

Youth career
- –2023: Zenit St. Petersburg

Senior career*
Years	Team	Apps	(Gls)
2023–2026	Sochi	52	(0)
2026–	Zenit Saint Petersburg	0	(0)
2026–	→ Orenburg (loan)	0	(0)

International career^{‡}
2024–	Russia U-21	4	(0)
- * Club domestic league appearances and goals as of 8 September 2026 ‡ National team caps and goals as of 5 September 2025

Aleksandr Ruslanovich Dyogtev (Russian: Александр Русланович Дёгтев; born 27 April 2005) is a Russian football player who plays as a goalkeeper for Orenburg on loan from Zenit St. Petersburg.

== Career ==
Dyogtev made his debut in the Russian Premier League for Sochi on 25 May 2024 in a game against Rubin Kazan.

On 8 September 2026, Dyogtev returned to his youth club Zenit Saint Petersburg with a five-year contract. Two days later, he was loaned to Orenburg for the 2026–27 season.

== Career statistics ==
As of 28 October 2026

Club	Season	League			Cup		Other		Total	
Club	Season	Division	Apps	Goals	Apps	Goals	Apps	Goals	Apps	Goals
Sochi	2023–24	Russian Premier League	1	0	0	0	—		1	0
Sochi	2024–25	Russian First League	24	0	0	0	2 (Note: Appearances in promotion play-offs)	0	26	0
Sochi	2025–26	Russian Premier League	18	0	2	0	—		20	0
Sochi	Total		43	0	2	0	2	0	47	0
Orenburg (loan)	2026–27	Russian Premier League	0	0	2	0	—		2	0
Career total			43	0	4	0	2	0	49	0
