= Marcelo Alves =

Brazilian footballer (born 1998)

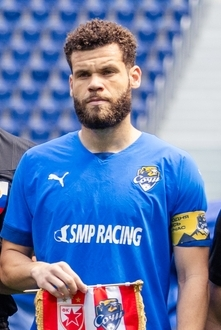

Personal information
- Full name: Marcelo Alves Santos
- Date of birth: 7 February 1998 (age 28)
- Place of birth: Rio de Janeiro, Brazil
- Height: 1.92 m (6 ft 4 in)
- Position: Centre back

Team information
- Current team: Sochi
- Number: 33

Youth career
- Madureira

Senior career*
Years	Team	Apps	(Gls)
2017–2024	Madureira	17	(0)
2018	→ Barra da Tijuca (loan)	1	(0)
2019	→ Rio Branco-ES (loan)	0	(0)
2020–2021	→ Vasco da Gama (loan)	16	(0)
2021–2022	→ Vitória (loan)	18	(0)
2022–2023	→ Tondela (loan)	40	(4)
2023–2024	→ Sochi (loan)	13	(0)
2024–	Sochi	40	(6)
- * Club domestic league appearances and goals as of 17 May 2026

Marcelo Alves Santos (born 7 February 1998), known as Marcelo Alves, is a Brazilian professional footballer who plays as a central defender for Russian club Sochi.

== Club career ==
Marcelo Alves was born in Rio de Janeiro, and finished his formation with Madureira. He made his first team debut on 13 July 2017, starting in a 1–2 away loss against São Gonçalo, for the year's Copa Rio.

Marcelo Alves was definitely promoted to the main squad in November 2018, after an unassuming loan spell at Barra da Tijuca. After being sparingly used, he moved to Rio Branco-ES also in a temporary deal.

On 30 July 2020, still owned by Madureira, Marcelo Alves was announced at Série A side Vasco da Gama. He made his debut in the category on 2 September, starting in a 2–2 away draw against Santos.

On 24 June 2023, Marcelo Alves moved on a new loan to the Russian Premier League club Sochi, with an option to buy. On 22 February 2024, Sochi made the transfer permanent and signed a contract with Marcelo Alves until 2028.

== Career statistics ==
As of 17 May 2026

Appearances and goals by club, season and competition
Club	Season	League			State League		Cup		Continental		Other		Total	
Club	Season	Division	Apps	Goals	Apps	Goals	Apps	Goals	Apps	Goals	Apps	Goals	Apps	Goals
Madureira	2017	Carioca	—		0	0	—		—		1 (Note: Appearance(s) in Copa Rio)	0	1	0
Madureira	2018	Série D	0	0	0	0	0	0	—		—		0	0
Madureira	2019	Carioca	—		5	0	—		—		2	0	7	0
Madureira	2020	Carioca	—		11	0	—		—		—		11	0
Madureira	2022	Carioca	—		1	0	—		—		—		1	0
Madureira	Total		0	0	17	0	0	0	—		3	0	20	0
Barra da Tijuca (loan)	2018	Carioca Série B1	—		1	0	—		—		—		1	0
Rio Branco-ES (loan)	2019	Capixaba	—		0	0	—		—		12 (Note: Appearance(s) in Copa Espírito Santo)	0	12	0
Vasco da Gama (loan)	2020	Série A	14	0	—		0	0	2 (Note: Appearance(s) in Copa Sudamericana)	0	—		16	0
Vitória (loan)	2021	Série B	13	0	5	0	5	0	—		—		23	0
Tondela (loan)	2022–23	Liga Portugal 2	31	4	—		3	0	—		5 (Note: Four appearances in Taça da Liga, one appearance in Supertaça Cândido de Oliveira)	0	39	4
Sochi (loan)	2023–24	Russian Premier League	13	0	—		4	0	—		—		17	0
Sochi	2023–24	Russian Premier League	12	2	—		—		—		—		12	2
Sochi	2024–25	Russian First League	9	2	—		0	0	—		—		9	2
Sochi	2025–26	Russian Premier League	19	2	—		4	0	—		—		23	2
Sochi	Total		40	6	—		4	0	—		—		44	6
Career total			111	10	23	0	16	0	2	0	20	0	172	10
