= Miguel Silveira =

Brazilian footballer (born 2003)

Miguel
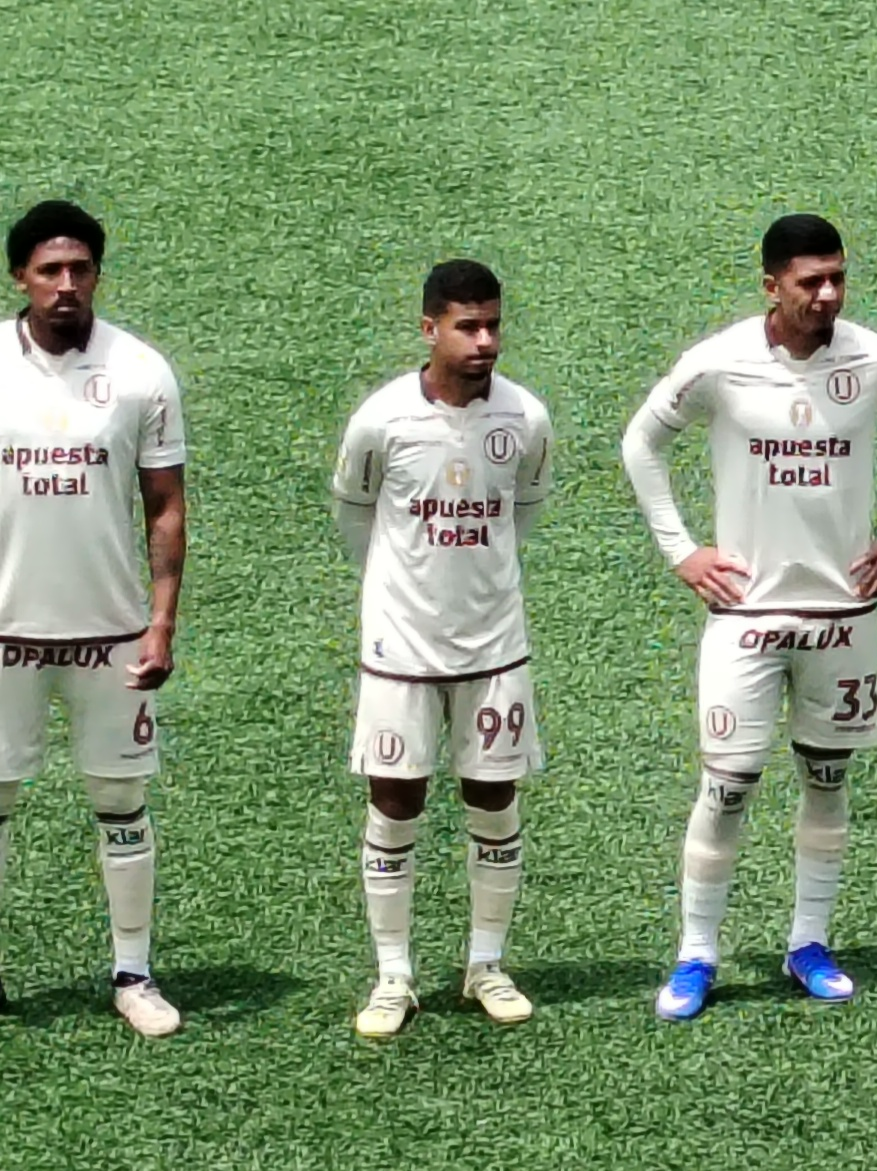

Personal information
- Full name: Miguel Silveira dos Santos
- Date of birth: 26 March 2003 (age 23)
- Place of birth: Vila Velha, Brazil
- Height: 1.74 m (5 ft 9 in)
- Position: Attacking midfielder

Team information
- Current team: Cusco FC
- Number: 99

Youth career
- –2013: Desportiva Ferroviária
- 2013–2015: Fluminense
- 2015–2016: Vasco da Gama
- 2016–2019: Fluminense

Senior career*
Years	Team	Apps	(Gls)
2019–2021	Fluminense	17	(0)
2021–2022	Red Bull Bragantino	25	(2)
2023–2024	Sochi	26	(1)
2025–2026	Albirex Niigata	5	(1)
2026–	Universitario	8	(1)
2026-	Cusco FC		

International career
- Brazil U15
2019	Brazil U17	1	(1)
- * Club domestic league appearances and goals as of 16 September 2025

Miguel Silveira dos Santos (born 26 March 2003), simply known as Miguel, is a Brazilian footballer who plays as an attacking midfielder for Peruvian Liga 1 club Cusco FC.

== Club career ==
=== Early career ===
Born in Vila Velha, Espírito Santo, Miguel began his career with local side Desportiva Ferroviária before joining Fluminense at the age of ten. Despite winning minor youth titles with Flu, he moved to Vasco da Gama in 2015, but only stayed 11 months at the latter before returning to his previous club.

=== Fluminense ===
In April 2019, aged just 16, Miguel was called up to train with the first team by manager Fernando Diniz. He made his professional debut on 6 June, coming on as a late substitute for Nino in a 2–2 away draw against Cruzeiro, for the year's Copa do Brasil; aged 16 years, two months and ten days, he became the youngest player to debut for Flu in the professional era, and the tenth overall.

One day after his debut, Miguel signed his first professional contract with Fluminense, after agreeing to a three-year deal. He made his Série A debut on 15 July, replacing fellow youth graduate João Pedro late into a 1–1 home draw against Ceará.

On 8 May 2021, Miguel took a legal action against Fluminense to rescind his contract, alleging unpaid wages. On 11 August, he was declared a free agent after winning the Court action; Fluminense also released a note stating that the club will appeal the decision.

In September 2021, Miguel and Fluminense reached an agreement, with the club keeping 30% of the player's economic rights.

=== Red Bull Bragantino ===
On 24 September 2021, Red Bull Bragantino officially announced the signing of Miguel on a contract until December 2022. He only made his debut for the club the following 27 January, playing the last nine minutes in a 3–1 Campeonato Paulista away loss against Mirassol.

Miguel scored his first senior goal on 6 February 2022, netting the opener in a 1–1 draw at Ferroviária. On 14 November, after featuring sparingly, he left the club after Braga announced that his contract would not be renewed.

=== PFC Sochi ===
On 22 February 2023, Miguel joined Russian Premier League club Sochi.

=== Albirex Niigata ===
On 17 January 2025, it was announced that Miguel would be joining J1 League club Albirex Niigata for the 2025 season.

== Personal life ==
Miguel has been Nike-sponsored since the age of 13.

== Career statistics ==
=== Club ===
As of the start for 2025 season.

Appearances and goals by club, season and competition
Club	Season	League			State League		Cup		League Cup		Continental		Other		Total	
Club	Season	Division	Apps	Goals	Apps	Goals	Apps	Goals	Apps	Goals	Apps	Goals	Apps	Goals	Apps	Goals
Fluminense	2019	Série A	3	0	0	0	1	0	—		—		—		4	0
Fluminense	2020	Série A	4	0	9	0	1	0	—		1 (Note: Appearance(s) in Copa Sudamericana)	0	—		15	0
Fluminense	2021	Série A	0	0	1	0	0	0	—		0	0	—		1	0
Fluminense	Total		7	0	10	0	2	0	—		1	0	—		20	0
Red Bull Bragantino	2021	Série A	0	0	—		—		—		—		—		0	0
Red Bull Bragantino	2022	Série A	17	1	7	1	0	0	—		1 (Note: Appearance(s) in Copa Libertadores)	0	—		25	2
Red Bull Bragantino	Total		17	1	7	1	0	0	—		1	0	—		25	2
Sochi	2022–23	Russian Premier League	2	0	—		0	0	—		—		—		2	0
Sochi	2023–24	Russian Premier League	24	1	—		6	1	—		—		—		30	2
Sochi	Total		26	1	—		6	1	—		—		—		33	2
Albirex Niigata	2025	J1 League	0	0	—		0	0	0	0	—		—		0	0
Career total			50	2	17	1	8	1	0	0	2	0	0	0	77	4
