= Saúl Guarirapa =

Venezuelan footballer (born 2002)

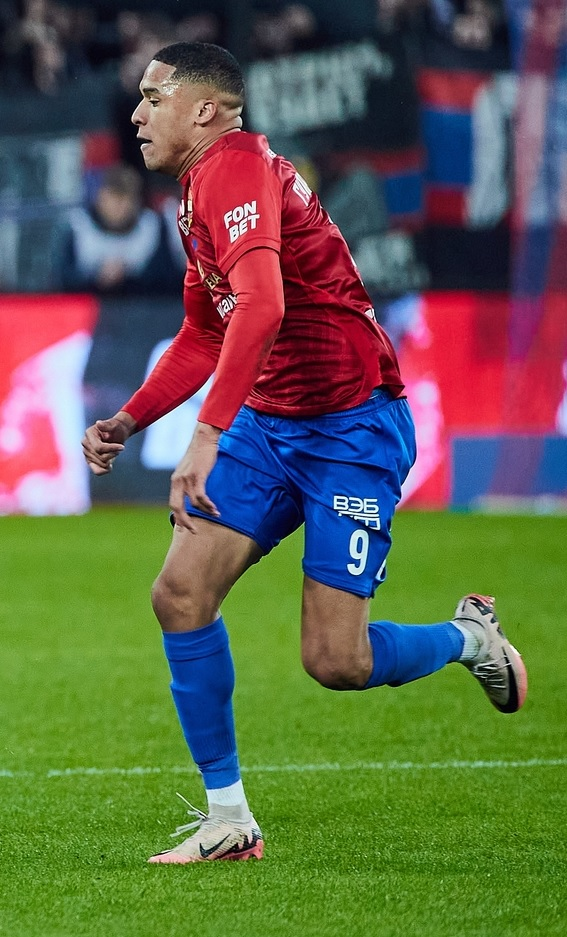
- Guarirapa with CSKA Moscow in 2025

Personal information
- Full name: Saúl Alejandro Guarirapa Briceño
- Date of birth: 18 October 2002 (age 24)
- Place of birth: Puerto La Cruz, Venezuela
- Height: 1.89 m (6 ft 2 in)
- Position: Striker

Team information
- Current team: Zhejiang FC (on loan from Sochi)
- Number: 23

Youth career
- 2014–2017: Deportivo Anzoátegui
- 2017–2019: Caracas

Senior career*
| Years | Team | Apps | (Gls) |
| 2019–2024 | Caracas | 57 | (15) |
| 2024 | → Sochi (loan) | 10 | (8) |
| 2024– | Sochi | 15 | (1) |
| 2024–2025 | → CSKA Moscow (loan) | 20 | (5) |
| 2025–2026 | → Sharjah (loan) | 5 | (1) |
| 2026– | → Zhejiang FC (loan) | 10 | (2) |

International career^{‡}
| 2022 | Venezuela U-20 | 4 | (0) |
| 2023 | Venezuela U-23 | 4 | (0) |
| 2025– | Venezuela | 1 | (0) |
- * Club domestic league appearances and goals as of 30 May 2026 ‡ National team caps and goals as of 18 January 2025

Saúl Alejandro Guarirapa Briceño (born 18 October 2002) is a Venezuelan football player who plays as a striker for Chinese Super League club Zhejiang FC, and the Venezuela national team.

== Club career ==
On 18 January 2024, Guarirapa joined Russian Premier League club Sochi on loan with an option to buy. He made his RPL debut for Sochi on 10 March 2024 in a game against Lokomotiv Moscow. He scored 8 goals in 10 games for Sochi, becoming the top scorer in the RPL for games played in 2024. However, Sochi was relegated to the Russian First League

On 30 May 2024, Sochi exercised their option to buy and signed a four-year contract with Guarirapa.

On 12 September 2024, Guarirapa moved to CSKA Moscow on loan with an option to buy.

On 29 September 2025, Guarirapa was loaned to Emirati club Sharjah for the 2025–26 season.

On 25 February 2026, Guarirapa was loaned to Chinese Super League club Zhejiang FC.

== International career ==
In June 2023, he took part in the Maurice Revello Tournament in France with Venezuela. Guarirapa made his debut for the Venezuela national team on 18 January 2025 in a friendly against the United States.

== Career statistics ==
=== Club ===
As of match played 30 May 2026

Appearances and goals by club, season and competition
| Club | Season | League | | | Cup | | Continental | | Other | | Total | |
| Club | Season | Division | Apps | Goals | Apps | Goals | Apps | Goals | Apps | Goals | Apps | Goals |
|---|---|---|---|---|---|---|---|---|---|---|---|---|
| Caracas | 2020 | Venezuelan Primera División | 11 | 3 | 0 | 0 | 6 (Note: Four appearances and one goal in Copa Libertadores, two appearances in Copa Sudamericana) | 1 | — | | 17 | 4 |
| Caracas | 2022 | Venezuelan Primera División | 15 | 3 | 0 | 0 | 5 (Note: Appearances in Copa Libertadores) | 0 | — | | 20 | 3 |
| Caracas | 2023 | Venezuelan Primera División | 31 | 9 | 0 | 0 | 1 (Note: Appearances in Copa Sudamericana) | 0 | — | | 32 | 9 |
| Caracas | Total | | 57 | 15 | 0 | 0 | 12 | 1 | — | | 69 | 16 |
| Sochi (loan) | 2023–24 | Russian Premier League | 10 | 8 | 1 | 1 | — | | — | | 11 | 9 |
| Sochi | 2024–25 | Russian First League | 9 | 1 | 0 | 0 | — | | — | | 9 | 1 |
| Sochi | 2025–26 | Russian Premier League | 6 | 0 | 0 | 0 | — | | — | | 6 | 0 |
| Sochi | Sochi total | | 25 | 9 | 1 | 1 | — | | — | | 26 | 10 |
| CSKA Moscow (loan) | 2024–25 | Russian Premier League | 20 | 5 | 10 | 0 | — | | — | | 30 | 5 |
| Sharjah (loan) | 2025–26 | UAE Pro League | 5 | 1 | 0 | 0 | 2 (Note: Appearances in AFC Champions League Elite) | 0 | 1 (Note: Appearances in UAE League Cup) | 0 | 8 | 1 |
| Zhejiang FC (loan) | 2026 | Chinese Super League | 10 | 2 | 0 | 0 | — | | — | | 10 | 2 |
| Career total | | | 117 | 32 | 11 | 1 | 14 | 1 | 1 | 0 | 143 | 34 |

== Honours ==
CSKA Moscow

- Russian Cup: 2024–25
