= Danil Anosov =

Russian footballer (born 2005)

Personal information
- Full name: Danil Sergeyevich Anosov
- Date of birth: 26 February 2005 (age 21)
- Place of birth: Belgorod, Russia
- Height: 1.76 m (5 ft 9 in)
- Position: Left midfielder

Team information
- Current team: Volgar Astrakhan (on loan from Sochi)
- Number: 69

Youth career
- Salyut Belgorod
- Dynamo Moscow
- 2018: DYuSSh-6 Norilsk
- 2018–2022: Akademiya Futbola Shebekino
- 2023–2024: Sochi

Senior career*
Years	Team	Apps	(Gls)
2022	Salyut Belgorod	0	(0)
2023–	Sochi	3	(0)
2024–2025	→ Volgar Astrakhan (loan)	15	(1)
2025	→ Sochi-2	14	(2)
2025–2026	→ Tekstilshchik Ivanovo (loan)	35	(6)
2026–	→ Volgar Astrakhan (loan)	17	(2)
- * Club domestic league appearances and goals as of 15 November 2026

Danil Sergeyevich Anosov (Russian: Данил Сергеевич Аносов; born 26 February 2005) is a Russian football player who plays as a left midfielder for Volgar Astrakhan on loan from Sochi.

== Career ==
Anosov made his debut for Sochi on 9 August 2023 in a Russian Cup game against Orenburg. He made his Russian Premier League debut for Sochi on 16 September 2023 against Spartak Moscow.

== Career statistics ==
As of 25 May 2024

Club	Season	League			Cup		Continental		Total	
Club	Season	Division	Apps	Goals	Apps	Goals	Apps	Goals	Apps	Goals
Salyut Belgorod	2021–22	Russian Second League	0	0	0	0	–		0	0
Salyut Belgorod	2022–23	Russian Second League	0	0	1	0	–		1	0
Salyut Belgorod	Total		0	0	1	0	0	0	1	0
Sochi	2023–24	Russian Premier League	3	0	4	0	–		7	0
Career total			3	0	5	0	0	0	8	0
