= Kirill Kravtsov =

Russian footballer (born 2002)

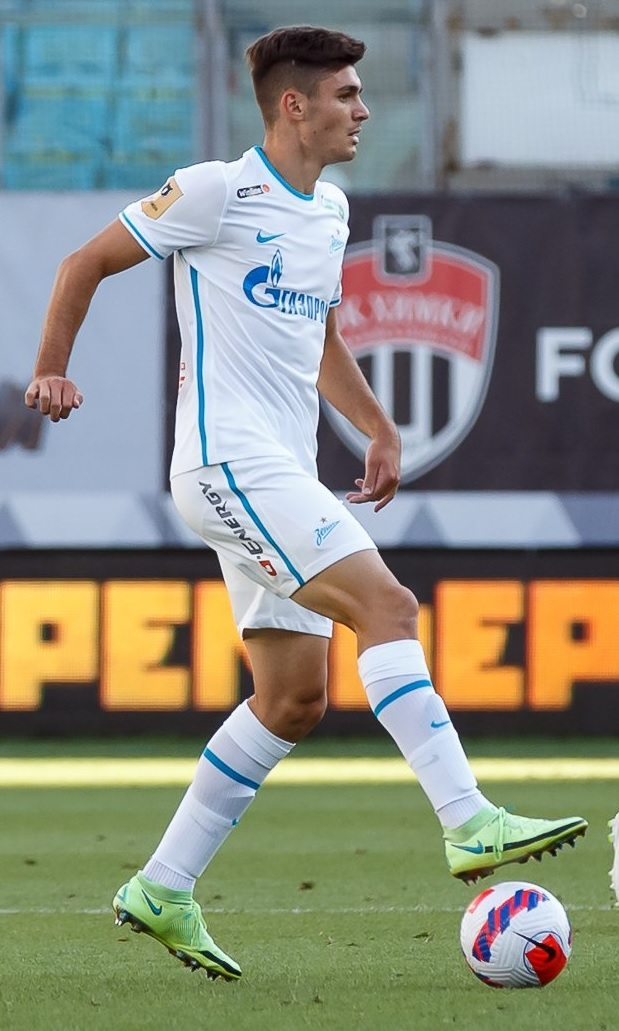
- Kravtsov with Zenit St. Petersburg in 2021

Personal information
- Full name: Kirill Sergeyevich Kravtsov
- Date of birth: 14 June 2002 (age 24)
- Place of birth: Saint Petersburg, Russia
- Height: 1.87 m (6 ft 2 in)
- Position: Defensive midfielder

Team information
- Current team: Dinamo Zagreb
- Number: 5

Youth career
- –2021: Zenit Saint Petersburg

Senior career*
Years	Team	Apps	(Gls)
2020–2021	Zenit-2 Saint Petersburg	25	(3)
2021–2022	Zenit Saint Petersburg	13	(0)
2022	→ Nizhny Novgorod (loan)	11	(1)
2022–2026	Sochi	92	(10)
2026–	Dinamo Zagreb	5	(0)

International career^{‡}
2018–2019	Russia U17	4	(0)
2019	Russia U18	7	(0)
2019–2020	Russia U19	6	(1)
2021–2022	Russia U21	8	(2)
- * Club domestic league appearances and goals as of 18 October 2026 ‡ National team caps and goals as of 16 November 2022

Kirill Sergeyevich Kravtsov (Russian: Кирилл Сергеевич Кравцов; born 14 June 2002) is a Russian football player who plays as a defensive midfielder for Croatian Football League side Dinamo Zagreb.

== Club career ==
He made his debut in the Russian Premier League for FC Zenit Saint Petersburg on 13 March 2021 in a game against FC Akhmat Grozny. He substituted Magomed Ozdoyev in the 83rd minute.

On 11 February 2022, Zenit loaned Kravtsov to FC Nizhny Novgorod until the end of the 2022–23 season, reserving the right to terminate the loan early. On 10 June 2022, Zenit recalled Kravtsov from loan.

On 22 July 2022, Kravtsov moved to Sochi.

== International career ==
Kravtsov was first called up to the Russia national football team for a training camp in September 2023.

== Career statistics ==
=== Club ===
As of match played 18 October 2026

Appearances and goals by club, season and competition
Club	Season	League			Cup		Continental		Other		Total	
Club	Season	Division	Apps	Goals	Apps	Goals	Apps	Goals	Apps	Goals	Apps	Goals
Zenit-2 St. Petersburg	2020–21	Russian Second League	21	2	–		–		–		21	2
Zenit-2 St. Petersburg	2021–22	Russian Second League	4	1	–		–		–		4	1
Zenit-2 St. Petersburg	Total		25	3	0	0	0	0	0	0	25	3
Zenit St. Petersburg	2020–21	Russian Premier League	4	0	0	0	0	0	0	0	4	0
Zenit St. Petersburg	2021–22	Russian Premier League	9	0	0	0	2 (Note: Appearances in the UEFA Champions League)	0	1 (Note: Appearance in the Russian Super Cup)	0	12	0
Zenit St. Petersburg	Total		13	0	0	0	2	0	1	0	16	0
Nizhny Novgorod (loan)	2021–22	Russian Premier League	11	1	1	0	–		–		12	1
Sochi	2022–23	Russian Premier League	24	1	5	0	–		–		29	1
Sochi	2023–24	Russian Premier League	26	3	3	1	–		–		29	4
Sochi	2024–25	Russian First League	25	3	2	1	–		–		27	4
Sochi	2025–26	Russian Premier League	17	3	3	0	—		—		20	3
Sochi	Total		92	10	13	2	–		–		105	12
Dinamo Zagreb	2026–27	Croatian Football League	5	0	1	1	1 (Note: Appearances in UEFA Europa League)	0	—		7	1
Career total			146	14	15	3	3	0	1	0	165	17

== Honours ==
Zenit Saint Petersburg

- Russian Premier League: 2020–21
- Russian Super Cup: 2021, 2022
