= FC Chelyabinsk =

Russian football club

- Full name: Football Club Chelyabinsk
- Founded: 1977
- Ground: Central Stadium
- Capacity: 15,000
- Chairman: Konstantin Arestov
- Manager: Aleksei Melyoshin
- League: Russian First League
- 2025–26: 10th of 18
- Website: fc-chel.ru
| Home colours | Away colours |

Football Club Chelyabinsk (Russian: ФК «Челябинск») is a Russian football club from Chelyabinsk that plays in the Russian First League, the second tier of the Russian football league system.

It played professionally from 1989 to 1993 and from 1997 on. The club was called Strela Chelyabinsk (1977–1989) and Zenit Chelyabinsk (1990–2008). It played on the second-highest level, Russian First Division, in 1992 and 1993.

== History ==
The club was founded in 1977 as Strela Chelyabinsk. From 1977 to 1989 the club played in the regional leagues, and won the league title in 1980. The club also played the regional final 5 times, winning it in 1986 and 1987. In 1990 the club was renamed to Zenit Chelyabinsk. It was promoted to the second-highest level, Russian First Division, in 1992. The following year, the club was relegated.

In 2009 the club was renamed to its current name, FC Chelyabinsk. The club made a great run in the 2009–10 Russian Cup, reaching the round of 16. Chelyabinsk entered the competition in the second round, where they beat FC Tyumen. In the third round, they defeated Gornyak Uchaly, and in the fourth round, they eliminated Gazovik Orenburg 4–1. In the fifth round, they defeated second division club FC KAMAZ. Now in the round of 32, the club produced a massive upset when they beat Russian Premier League club PFC Krylia. Their run came to an end in the round of 16, where Mordovia Saransk defeated them 2–0.

In the 2024–25 Second League Division A season, Chelyabinsk qualified to the promotion play-offs, where they defeated Volgar Astrakhan in a penalty shoot-out (after 1–1 aggregate tie), earning promotion to the Russian First League.

== Current squad ==
As of 11 September 2026, according to the First League website.

Note: Flags indicate national team as defined under FIFA eligibility rules; some limited exceptions apply. Players may hold more than one non-FIFA nationality.

| No. | Pos. | Nation | Player |
|---|---|---|---|
| 1 | GK | RUS | Ivan Lomayev |
| 5 | DF | RUS | Bulat Gatin |
| 6 | MF | RUS | Sergei Makarov |
| 7 | FW | RUS | Ilya Safronov |
| 9 | MF | RUS | Nikita Zyryanov |
| 10 | MF | RUS | Ramazan Gadzhimuradov |
| 11 | MF | RUS | Gleb Miroshnichenko |
| 12 | MF | RUS | Aleksandr Novosad |
| 13 | DF | RUS | Artyom Tushin |
| 15 | DF | RUS | Khetag Kochiyev |
| 16 | GK | RUS | Aleksandr Melezhechkin |
| 17 | MF | CIV | Baba N'Diaye |
| 18 | MF | RUS | Konstantin Kertanov |
| 21 | DF | RUS | Aleksei Berdnikov |
| 23 | DF | RUS | Bogdan Rogochy |
| 24 | DF | RUS | Nikolay Pridava (on loan from Rodina Moscow) |
| 27 | DF | RUS | Ilya Gribakin |
| 29 | FW | RUS | Matvey Urvantsev (on loan from Pari Nizhny Novgorod) |
| 31 | GK | RUS | Mark Pereverzev |
| 33 | MF | RUS | Denis Pokotylo |
| 44 | DF | RUS | Igor Rusyayev |
| 50 | DF | RUS | Vitali Lystsov |
| 53 | FW | RUS | Tikhon Orlov |

| No. | Pos. | Nation | Player |
|---|---|---|---|
| 55 | MF | RUS | Georgy Borisov |
| 57 | GK | RUS | Timofey Shlyakhtichenko |
| 65 | DF | RUS | Aleksandr Konyushenko |
| 67 | FW | RUS | Aleksandr Pashkov |
| 68 | MF | RUS | Mark Kaptinar |
| 70 | MF | RUS | Garrik Levin |
| 71 | FW | RUS | Vsevolod Buradzhiyev |
| 72 | DF | RUS | Aleksandr Bem |
| 74 | FW | ALB | Luis Kaçorri |
| 76 | MF | RUS | Nikolay Kozlov |
| 77 | MF | RUS | Denis Samoylov |
| 78 | MF | RUS | Yefim Stanislavchuk |
| 80 | DF | RUS | Artyom Permyakov |
| 81 | GK | RUS | Aleksandr Suvorov |
| 82 | DF | RUS | Artyom Ignatyev |
| 84 | DF | RUS | Denis Firsov |
| 85 | MF | RUS | Danil Shageyev |
| 89 | MF | RUS | Ilya Yurin |
| 92 | MF | RUS | Dmitry Yudin |
| 93 | GK | RUS | Ilya Tuseyev |
| 97 | FW | RUS | Aleksandr Chemasov |
| 99 | FW | RUS | Dmitri Kamenshchikov |

=== Out on loan ===
Note: Flags indicate national team as defined under FIFA eligibility rules; some limited exceptions apply. Players may hold more than one non-FIFA nationality.

| No. / Pos. / Nation / Player; — / FW / RUS / Denis Pushkaryov (at Shinnik Yaroslavl until 30 June 2027) | No. / Pos. / Nation / Player; — / FW / RUS / Vladimir Ulyanovsky (at Torpedo Miass until 30 June 2027) |
