= Nikolay Genchu =

Russian footballer

Personal information
- Full name: Nikolay Dmitriyevich Genchu
- Date of birth: 18 December 2003 (age 22)
- Place of birth: Moscow, Russia
- Height: 1.83 m (6 ft 0 in)
- Position: Defender

Team information
- Current team: Saturn Ramenskoye
- Number: 44

Youth career
- –2015: Trudovyye Rezervy-SAK Moscow
- 2015–2020: Spartak Moscow

Senior career*
Years	Team	Apps	(Gls)
2020–2022	Spartak-2 Moscow	2	(0)
2022–2023	Tver	28	(1)
2023–2025	Spartak Kostroma	44	(1)
2026–	Saturn Ramenskoye	28	(5)

International career^{‡}
2019	Russia U17	2	(0)
- * Club domestic league appearances and goals as of 31 October 2026 ‡ National team caps and goals as of 12 December 2019

Nikolay Dmitriyevich Genchu (Russian: Николай Дмитриевич Генчу; born 18 December 2003) is a Russian football player who plays for Saturn Ramenskoye.

== Club career ==
He made his debut in the Russian Football National League for FC Spartak-2 Moscow on 9 October 2021 in a game against FC Akron Tolyatti.
