= Ilya Safronov =

Russian footballer

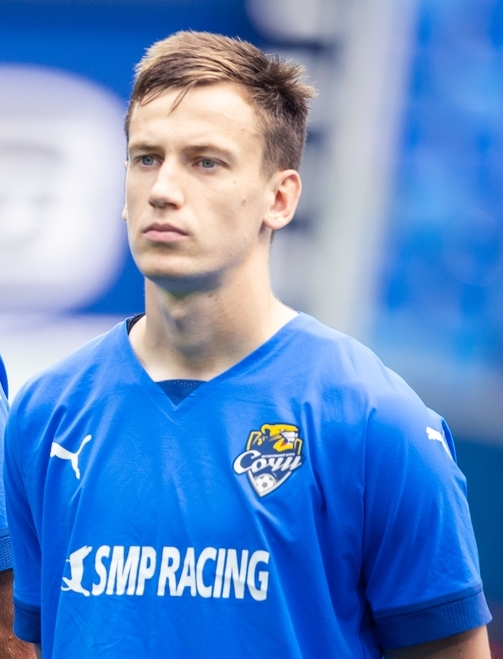

Personal information
- Full name: Ilya Sergeyevich Safronov
- Date of birth: 26 August 1998 (age 28)
- Place of birth: Yarovoye, Russia
- Height: 1.82 m (6 ft 0 in)
- Positions: Midfielder; forward

Team information
- Current team: Chelyabinsk
- Number: 7

Senior career*
Years	Team	Apps	(Gls)
2015–2016	Yakutiya Yakutsk	0	(0)
2016	Yakutiya-RSDYuFSh Neryungri		
2017–2018	Sibir-M Novosibirsk		
2018–2019	Sibir Novosibirsk	8	(1)
2018–2019	→ Sibir-2 Novosibirsk	14	(2)
2019–2021	Novosibirsk	38	(5)
2021–2022	Olimp-Dolgoprudny	28	(2)
2022–2024	Rotor Volgograd	51	(14)
2024	Sochi	13	(0)
2024–2026	Rotor Volgograd	40	(9)
2026–	Chelyabinsk	0	(0)
- * Club domestic league appearances and goals as of 16 May 2026

Ilya Sergeyevich Safronov (Russian: Илья Сергеевич Сафронов; born 26 August 1998) is a Russian football player who plays for Chelyabinsk.

== Club career ==
He made his debut in the Russian Professional Football League for Sibir-2 Novosibirsk on 7 August 2018 in a game against Sakhalin Yuzhno-Sakhalinsk.

He made his Russian Football National League debut for Sibir Novosibirsk on 3 March 2019 in a game against Tyumen.

On 16 June 2024, Safronov scored a hat-trick in Rotor Volgograd's 3–1 victory over Novosibirsk in the second leg of the Russian Second League promotion play-offs to secure Russian First League spot for Rotor.
