= Martin Kramarič =

Slovenian footballer (born 1997)

Personal information
- Date of birth: 14 November 1997 (age 28)
- Place of birth: Novo Mesto, Slovenia
- Height: 1.75 m (5 ft 9 in)
- Position: Winger

Team information
- Current team: Krylia Sovetov Samara
- Number: 10

Youth career
- 2004–2014: Krka
- 2014–2015: Maribor

Senior career*
Years	Team	Apps	(Gls)
2014	Krka	15	(3)
2014–2020	Maribor	41	(1)
2014–2015	Maribor B	18	(4)
2016–2017	→ Krško (loan)	36	(6)
2020	→ Bravo (loan)	15	(1)
2020–2023	Bravo	89	(19)
2023–2026	Sochi	72	(20)
2026–	Krylia Sovetov Samara	11	(3)

International career
2015–2016	Slovenia U19 (Note: Official competitive UEFA matches only.)	4	(2)
2017	Slovenia B	1	(0)
2017–2018	Slovenia U21	13	(3)
- * Club domestic league appearances and goals as of 17 October 2026

Martin Kramarič (born 14 November 1997) is a Slovenian professional footballer who plays as a winger for Russian Premier League club Krylia Sovetov Samara.

With over 150 appearances in Slovenian PrvaLiga, he made his senior debut for Krka in 2014, and became the league's youngest ever goalscorer at the age of 16 in the same year. He also played for Maribor, Krško and Bravo.

== Club career ==
Born in Novo Mesto, Kramarič began his career at hometown club Krka. He made his professional debut in the Slovenian PrvaLiga on 22 March 2014, starting and playing for 81 minutes in a 3–1 loss against Maribor. On 12 April, he opened the scoring in a 1–1 home draw with Rudar Velenje; at the age of 16 years, 4 months and 29 days, he became the all-time youngest goalscorer in the league.

On 31 August 2014, Kramarič and teammate Matko Obradović moved to Maribor on a three-year contracts. In 55 total games for the club in all competitions, he scored once, opening a 5–1 win at Ankaran in the second minute of the match on 6 August 2017. After loans to fellow top-flight teams Krško and Bravo, he signed a permanent deal with the latter on 25 September 2020.

In 2021–22, Kramarič scored twice in the Slovenian Football Cup, including in the 3–2 home semi-final win over Domžale on 20 April, as his team finished as runners-up. On 9 October 2022, he scored his first career hat-trick in a 6–1 home win over city rivals Olimpija Ljubljana. After more than 100 appearances for Bravo, he left the club in May 2023 after his contract expired.

In June 2023, Kramarič moved abroad for the first time in his career and signed for the Russian Premier League side Sochi, thus joining former Bravo teammate Vanja Drkušić. On his debut in the first round of the 2023–24 season, he needed just six minutes to score his first goal for Sochi, in an eventual 2–0 win against Baltika Kaliningrad. Kramarič ended his first season with five goals and five assists, as Sochi was relegated to the second-tier Russian First League. However, the team was immediately promoted back to the top tier, with Kramarič being named as the best player of the 2024–25 Russian First League season. After the 2025–26 season, when Sochi was relegated again, Kramarič left the club after his contract expired. At the time of his departure, he was the second-highest all-time scorer for Sochi.

After leaving Sochi, Kramarič remained in Russia and signed a three-year contract with Russian Premier League club Krylia Sovetov Samara.

== Career statistics ==
As of 17 October 2026

Appearances and goals by club, season and competition
Club	Season	League			National cup (Note: Includes Slovenian Cup, Russian Cup)		Continental		Other		Total	
Club	Season	Division	Apps	Goals	Apps	Goals	Apps	Goals	Apps	Goals	Apps	Goals
Krka	2013–14	Slovenian PrvaLiga	8	1	0	0	—		—		8	1
Krka	2014–15	Slovenian PrvaLiga	7	2	1	0	—		—		8	2
Krka	Total		15	3	1	0	0	0	0	0	16	3
Maribor	2014–15	Slovenian PrvaLiga	1	0	0	0	0	0	—		1	0
Maribor	2017–18	Slovenian PrvaLiga	22	1	1	0	3 (Note: Appearances in UEFA Champions League)	0	—		26	1
Maribor	2018–19	Slovenian PrvaLiga	10	0	0	0	2 (Note: Appearances in UEFA Europa League)	0	—		12	0
Maribor	2019–20	Slovenian PrvaLiga	7	0	1	0	6 (Note: Five appearances in UEFA Champions League, one appearance in UEFA Europa League)	0	—		14	0
Maribor	2020–21	Slovenian PrvaLiga	1	0	—		1	0	—		2	0
Maribor	Total		41	1	2	0	12	0	0	0	55	1
Krško (loan)	2015–16	Slovenian PrvaLiga	6	1	0	0	—		—		6	1
Krško (loan)	2016–17	Slovenian PrvaLiga	30	5	3	0	—		—		33	5
Krško (loan)	Total		36	6	3	0	0	0	0	0	39	6
Bravo (loan)	2019–20	Slovenian PrvaLiga	15	1	0	0	—		—		15	1
Bravo	2020–21	Slovenian PrvaLiga	28	3	0	0	—		—		28	3
Bravo	2021–22	Slovenian PrvaLiga	30	5	4	2	—		—		34	7
Bravo	2022–23	Slovenian PrvaLiga	31	11	2	1	—		—		33	12
Bravo	Total		89	19	6	3	0	0	0	0	95	22
Sochi	2023–24	Russian Premier League	22	5	5	0	—		—		27	5
Sochi	2024–25	Russian First League	31	11	2	0	—		2 (Note: Appearances in promotion play-offs)	2	35	13
Sochi	2025–26	Russian Premier League	19	4	3	1	—		—		22	5
Sochi	Total		72	20	10	1	—		2	2	84	23
Krylia Sovetov Samara	2026–27	Russian Premier League	11	3	2	0	—		—		13	3
Career total			279	53	24	4	12	0	2	2	317	59
