= 2024–25 Russian First League =

Russian First League
- Season: 2024–25
- Dates: 13 July 2024 - 24 May 2025
- Champions: Baltika (1st title)
- Promoted: Baltika; Sochi
- Relegated: Tyumen; Alania
- Matches: 306
- Goals: 663 (2.17 per match)
- Top goalscorer: Martin Sekulić (14 goals)
- Biggest home win: Sochi 5–0 Chayka; 6 October 2024; Torpedo 5–0 Sokol; 12 October 2024; SKA-Khabarovsk 6–1 Chernomorets; 26 October 2024
- Biggest away win: Ufa 0–6 Baltika; 23 March 2025
- Highest scoring: Rodina 6–2 Shinnik; 24 May 2025
- Longest winning run: 8 matches Baltika
- Longest unbeaten run: 21 matches Torpedo
- Longest winless run: 16 matches Arsenal
- Longest losing run: 5 matches Shinnik; Tyumen
- Highest attendance: 30,112; Baltika 0–1 Torpedo; 3 May 2025
- Lowest attendance: 187; SKA-Khabarovsk 2–0 Neftekhimik; 15 September 2024 (played in Ramenskoye)
- Total attendance: 1,217,647
- Average attendance: 4,019 (three games held behind closed doors are not used to calculate the average)
- All statistics correct as of complete.

The 2024–25 Russian First League was the 33rd season of Russia's second-tier football league since the dissolution of the Soviet Union. The season began on 13 July 2024, and had a 3-month winter break between game weeks 21 and 22 (1 December 2024 to 1 March 2025).

== Team changes ==
=== To First League ===
Promoted from Second League Division A

- Ufa
- Chayka Peschanokopskoye
- Rotor Volgograd

Relegated from Premier League

- Ural Yekaterinburg
- Baltika Kaliningrad
- Sochi

=== From First League ===
Relegated to Second League

- Leningradets
- Volgar Astrakhan
- Kuban Krasnodar

Promoted to Premier League

- Khimki
- Dynamo Makhachkala
- Akron Tolyatti

== Stadiums by locations ==
Location of teams in 2024–25 First League.

== League table ==
Pos	Team	Pld	W	D	L	GF	GA	GD	Pts	Promotion, qualification or relegation
1	Baltika Kaliningrad (C, P)	34	19	12	3	50	18	+32	69	Promotion to Premier League
2	Torpedo Moscow (Note: The owner and the general director of Torpedo were arrested on 19 June 2025 and later charged with attempting to bribe a referee during the 2024–25 season. Russian Football Union conducted their own investigation. On 10 July 2025, Torpedo was excluded from the RPL for the 2025–26 season, cancelling their promotion. They remained in the Russian First League.)	34	17	14	3	51	25	+26	65	
3	Chernomorets Novorossiysk (Note: Chernomorets was not issued the 2025–26 RPL license and was replaced in the play-offs by Sochi.)	34	19	7	8	51	34	+17	64	
4	Ural Yekaterinburg	34	16	11	7	50	38	+12	59	Qualification to Premier League play-offs
5	Sochi (O, P)	34	16	9	9	55	34	+21	57	Qualification to Premier League play-offs
6	SKA-Khabarovsk	34	15	8	11	44	41	+3	53	
7	Rodina Moscow	34	13	11	10	41	31	+10	50	
8	Yenisey Krasnoyarsk	34	14	7	13	36	39	−3	49	
9	Rotor Volgograd	34	11	14	9	32	26	+6	47	
10	Arsenal Tula	34	8	17	9	25	30	−5	41	
11	KAMAZ Naberezhnye Chelny	34	10	8	16	31	35	−4	38 (Note: Ranked on head-to-head points (KAMAZ 6, Neftekhimik 5, Chayka 4))	
12	Neftekhimik Nizhnekamsk	34	9	11	14	31	37	−6	38	
13	Chayka Peschanokopskoye	34	8	14	12	31	43	−12	38	
14	Shinnik Yaroslavl	34	8	11	15	24	42	−18	35 (Note: Ranked on head-to-head goal difference (Shinnik +1, Ufa –1))	
15	Ufa	34	9	8	17	32	48	−16	35	
16	Sokol Saratov (Note: Sokol was not relegated despite finishing in the relegation spot, as Khimki which was administratively relegated from Premier League to the First League was later dissolved, with Sokol replacing them in the First League)	34	7	11	16	25	41	−16	32	
17	Alania Vladikavkaz (R)	34	6	9	19	24	50	−26	27 (Note: Ranked on head-to-head points (Alania 4, Tyumen 1))	Relegation to Second League
18	Tyumen (R)	34	7	6	21	30	51	−21	27	Relegation to Second League

Source: Soccerway
Rules for classification: 1) Points; 2) Head-to-head points; 3) Head-to-head matches won; 4) Head-to-head goal difference; 5) Head-to-head goals scored; 6) Head-to-head away goals scored; 7) Matches won; 8) Goal difference; 9) Goals scored; 10) Away matches won; 11) Away goals scored; 12) Best disciplinary record (3 points for red card, 1 point for yellow card); 13) Drawing lots. If teams tied on points did not play an equal number of head-to-head games, head-to-head criteria and disciplinary record are not used for positioning. If 1st- and 2nd-placed teams are tied in the final standings on the first 12 criteria, a winner is determined in an additional play-off game, with no extra time and a penalty-shootout if tied at the end of regulation, instead of drawing lots.
(C) Champions; (O) Play-off winners; (P) Promoted; (R) Relegated

== Positions by round ==
Team ╲ Round	1	2	3	4	5	6	7	8	9	10	11	12	13	14	15	16	17	18	19	20	21	22	23	24	25	26	27	28	29	30	31	32	33	34
Baltika Kaliningrad	10	11	14	9	11	13	10	6	4	4	7	4	4	4	2	2	2	2	1	1	1	1	1	1	1	1	1	1	1	1	1	1	1	1
Torpedo Moscow	1	4	3	4	5	3	3	3	3	2	3	2	2	2	1	1	1	1	2	2	2	2	2	2	2	2	2	2	2	2	2	2	2	2
Chernomorets Novorossiysk	15	14	10	15	16	14	14	14	11	6	4	5	6	5	6	6	7	6	6	5	5	3	4	5	4	4	4	4	3	3	3	3	3	3
Ural Yekaterinburg	3	2	6	7	2	2	2	2	2	3	2	3	3	3	4	4	4	3	3	3	3	4	5	4	5	5	5	3	4	5	5	5	5	4
Sochi	16	13	16	10	9	12	7	4	5	5	8	7	5	6	5	5	5	5	4	4	4	5	3	3	3	3	3	5	5	4	4	4	4	5
SKA-Khabarovsk	18	18	13	16	15	17	18	18	16	14	13	11	11	11	12	10	12	9	9	9	8	6	6	6	6	6	6	6	6	6	6	6	6	6
Rodina Moscow	11	9	5	8	7	8	8	9	6	9	6	8	8	9	10	12	11	8	10	11	12	13	13	13	12	10	10	8	7	8	7	7	7	7
Yenisey Krasnoyarsk	4	10	11	13	12	6	11	11	9	11	11	9	12	12	9	11	8	10	11	10	10	8	8	7	7	7	7	7	9	7	9	9	9	8
Rotor Volgograd	5	6	8	11	10	5	6	8	8	8	10	12	7	8	7	9	10	11	8	7	7	7	7	8	9	9	9	9	8	9	8	8	8	9
Arsenal Tula	6	3	1	1	1	1	1	1	1	1	1	1	1	1	3	3	3	4	5	6	6	9	9	9	8	8	8	10	10	10	10	10	10	10
KAMAZ Naberezhnye Chelny	13	16	17	14	13	11	13	12	15	13	14	14	14	13	14	13	14	12	13	13	13	12	12	12	13	11	13	13	14	11	11	11	12	11
Neftekhimik Nizhnekamsk	2	1	7	2	3	4	5	7	10	12	12	10	10	7	8	8	9	13	12	12	11	11	11	11	11	13	11	12	13	14	14	12	13	12
Chayka Peschanokopskoye	8	5	2	3	4	7	4	5	7	7	5	6	9	10	11	7	6	7	7	8	9	10	10	10	10	12	14	11	12	13	13	13	11	13
Shinnik Yaroslavl	14	15	18	18	18	18	17	16	13	15	15	15	15	15	16	16	15	15	15	14	14	14	14	14	14	14	12	14	11	12	12	14	14	14
Ufa	12	12	15	17	17	15	15	15	17	17	17	17	17	17	17	17	16	17	14	15	15	15	15	15	15	16	15	15	15	15	15	15	15	15
Sokol Saratov	7	7	4	5	6	9	9	10	12	10	9	13	13	14	15	15	13	14	16	16	16	16	16	16	17	17	17	18	18	18	17	18	16	16
Alania Vladikavkaz	9	8	9	6	8	10	12	13	14	16	16	16	16	16	13	14	17	16	17	17	17	17	17	17	16	15	16	16	17	17	16	17	17	17
Tyumen	17	17	12	12	14	16	16	17	18	18	18	18	18	18	18	18	18	18	18	18	18	18	18	18	18	18	18	17	16	16	18	16	18	18

Promotion
Play-offs
Relegation to 2024–25 Russian Second League

Source: everysport.com

== Results by round ==
Team ╲ Round	1	2	3	4	5	6	7	8	9	10	11	12	13	14	15	16	17	18	19	20	21	22	23	24	25	26	27	28	29	30	31	32	33	34
Alania Vladikavkaz	D	W	L	W	L	D	L	L	D	L	D	D	W	L	W	L	L	D	L	L	L	L	D	L	W	D	L	L	L	L	W	L	D	L
Arsenal Tula	W	W	W	W	D	D	D	W	D	W	D	D	D	D	D	D	L	D	D	L	L	L	D	D	D	L	W	L	L	D	L	L	W	D
Baltika Kaliningrad	D	D	D	W	D	L	W	W	W	L	D	W	D	W	W	W	W	W	W	W	W	D	D	W	W	W	W	W	D	W	L	D	D	D
Chayka Peschanokopskoye	D	W	W	D	D	L	W	D	L	D	W	L	L	D	D	W	W	L	D	D	D	D	L	D	L	L	L	W	D	L	L	D	W	L
Chernomorets Novorossiysk	L	L	W	L	L	W	D	D	W	W	W	W	L	W	D	L	L	W	W	W	W	W	D	L	W	D	W	D	W	W	W	D	W	W
KAMAZ Naberezhnye Chelny	L	L	L	W	D	W	L	D	L	W	L	W	D	D	L	W	L	W	L	L	L	W	W	L	L	W	L	D	D	W	L	L	D	D
Neftekhimik Nizhnekamsk	W	W	L	W	D	L	D	D	L	L	D	W	D	W	D	D	L	L	D	L	W	L	W	L	L	D	W	L	D	L	L	D	L	W
Rodina Moscow	D	W	W	L	D	D	D	D	W	L	W	L	D	D	L	D	D	W	L	L	L	L	D	W	D	W	W	W	W	L	W	W	L	W
Rotor Volgograd	W	D	L	L	W	W	D	D	D	D	L	D	W	D	W	L	L	D	W	W	D	D	D	D	L	L	W	D	W	D	W	W	L	L
Shinnik Yaroslavl	L	L	L	L	D	D	W	D	W	D	D	L	W	L	L	D	W	L	D	D	D	D	L	W	W	D	W	L	W	L	L	L	L	L
SKA-Khabarovsk	L	L	W	L	D	L	D	L	W	W	D	W	D	D	D	W	L	W	D	D	W	W	W	L	W	W	L	W	L	L	W	W	W	L
Sochi	L	D	L	W	W	L	W	W	D	D	D	D	W	D	W	L	W	D	W	W	W	D	W	W	L	W	L	L	W	W	W	D	L	L
Sokol Saratov	D	W	W	D	D	L	D	D	L	W	D	L	L	L	L	D	W	L	L	L	L	D	L	D	L	D	L	L	D	L	W	L	W	W
Torpedo Moscow	W	D	W	D	D	W	D	W	D	W	D	D	D	W	W	D	W	W	D	W	W	L	D	W	D	W	L	L	D	W	W	W	W	D
Tyumen	L	L	W	D	L	L	D	L	L	L	L	L	D	L	L	W	L	L	L	W	L	W	D	L	W	L	D	W	L	W	L	D	L	L
Ufa	D	L	D	D	L	W	L	L	L	W	L	D	D	L	L	W	W	L	W	L	L	D	D	L	L	L	D	W	L	W	W	L	L	W
Ural Yekaterinburg	W	W	L	D	W	W	D	W	D	L	W	L	D	W	D	L	D	W	W	W	D	D	L	W	D	D	W	W	D	L	L	W	W	W
Yenisey Krasnoyarsk	W	L	L	L	W	W	L	L	W	L	D	W	L	D	W	L	W	L	L	D	W	W	D	W	W	L	L	D	D	W	L	W	D	W

Source: Soccerstats.com (in English)
W = Win; D = Draw; L = Lose

== Results ==
Home \ Away	ALA	ARS	BAL	CHA	CHE	KAM	NEF	ROD	ROT	SHI	SKA	SOC	SOK	TOR	TYU	UFA	URA	YEN
Alania Vladikavkaz		0–0	0–2	2–3	2–0	0–2	1–2	0–1	1–3	1–2	0–4	1–1	2–1	2–4	0–0	0–0	0–1	0–1
Arsenal Tula	0–0		0–0	0–0	1–0	1–0	1–1	0–1	1–1	1–1	1–0	1–1	1–0	0–1	1–2	0–0	1–0	2–1
Baltika Kaliningrad	3–0	0–0		4–0	2–0	1–0	0–0	2–1	0–0	0–0	2–0	2–0	1–1	0–1	2–1	1–1	2–1	0–0
Chayka Peschanokopskoye	0–3	2–2	0–1		0–2	0–0	4–0	2–2	1–0	2–2	0–0	0–2	1–1	2–1	3–0	1–1	1–1	2–0
Chernomorets Novorossiysk	1–1	0–0	0–0	1–2		2–1	0–0	2–2	1–1	0–1	2–1	2–1	3–0	2–0	2–1	2–1	3–2	2–1
KAMAZ Naberezhnye Chelny	1–1	2–1	0–1	3–1	0–1		0–0	1–0	0–4	3–0	3–0	1–0	3–1	1–1	2–3	1–0	0–2	0–0
Neftekhimik Nizhnekamsk	0–0	2–2	1–2	2–1	0–2	0–0		2–1	1–0	1–0	0–1	1–1	0–0	0–1	3–0	2–1	1–1	0–1
Rodina Moscow	4–0	1–1	0–0	2–0	0–1	0–1	0–3		2–2	6–2	1–0	3–1	2–0	1–1	0–1	2–0	3–2	1–1
Rotor Volgograd	0–0	0–1	2–0	0–0	1–2	1–0	1–0	0–1		1–1	1–1	1–1	2–2	1–1	2–1	0–2	0–0	3–0
Shinnik Yaroslavl	1–0	2–1	1–3	0–0	0–2	1–0	1–1	0–0	0–1		0–1	0–2	0–4	1–1	0–2	2–0	0–2	2–0
SKA-Khabarovsk	0–3	1–0	1–2	1–0	6–1	2–1	2–0	1–0	1–0	0–0		0–1	2–2	2–2	2–1	1–0	3–3	1–2
Sochi	4–0	5–1	1–1	5–0	2–1	2–0	3–2	1–0	0–0	1–2	1–2		0–0	0–1	3–0	5–2	1–0	2–1
Sokol Saratov	0–1	1–0	1–1	1–0	1–2	1–0	1–3	1–2	0–1	0–0	0–1	1–1		1–2	1–0	0–1	0–0	1–0
Torpedo Moscow	3–0	2–2	2–1	1–1	1–1	1–1	2–1	0–0	0–1	1–0	4–0	2–2	5–0		1–0	0–0	1–1	2–1
Tyumen	0–1	0–0	0–1	1–1	1–4	1–1	1–0	1–2	0–1	2–1	0–1	0–1	0–1	0–3		1–1	1–2	4–1
Ufa	2–1	1–2	0–6	0–1	0–3	2–1	1–0	2–0	2–0	1–0	3–3	3–4	2–0	0–1	2–2		0–2	0–1
Ural Yekaterinburg	3–1	0–0	2–5	2–0	2–1	2–1	3–2	0–0	1–1	2–1	3–1	2–0	0–0	1–1	1–0	2–1		4–3
Yenisey Krasnoyarsk	1–0	2–0	1–2	0–0	0–3	2–1	2–0	0–0	2–0	0–0	2–2	1–0	2–1	0–1	4–3	1–0	3–0	

Source: First League (in Russian), Soccerway
Legend: Blue = home team win; Yellow = draw; Red = away team win.

== Season statistics ==
=== Top goalscorers ===
Rank	Player	Club	Goals
1	(Croatia) Martin Sekulić	Ural	14
2	(Russia) Georgi Gongadze	SKA-Khabarovsk	12
3	(Slovenia) Martin Kramarič	Sochi	11
3	(Russia) Artyom Maksimenko	Rodina	11
3	(Russia) Pavel Melyoshin	Sochi	11
3	(Russia) Aleksandr Yushin	Rodina	11
7	(Russia) Roman Akbashev	Chernomorets	9
8	(Russia) Aleksandr Lomakin	Yenisey	8
8	(Russia) Zakhar Fyodorov	Shinnik	8
10	(Bosnia and Herzegovina) Gedeon Guzina	Chernomorets	7
10	(Russia) Rashid Magomedov	Neftekhimik	7
10	(Peru) Yordy Reyna	Rodina	7
10	(Russia) Vladislav Rudenko	Chayka	7
10	(Russia) Maksim Turishchev	Rotor	7
10	(Russia) Merabi Uridia	Chernomorets	7
10	(Russia) Aleksandr Khokhlachyov	Chayka	7

== Attendances ==
#	Football club	Average attendance
1	Rotor Volgograd	14,392
2	Baltika Kaliningrad	14,200
3	Ural Yekaterinburg	9,010
4	Chernomorets Novorossiysk	5,988
5	PFC Sochi	4,105
6	Yenisey Krasnoyarsk	3,641
7	Arsenal Tula	3,203
8	Sokol Saratov	2,832
9	Shinnik Yaroslavl'	2,712
10	FC Tyumen'	2,613
11	FC KAMAZ	1,807
12	FK Ufa	1,687
13	Torpedo Moscow	1,516
14	SKA Khabarovsk	1,421
15	Neftekhimik Nizhnekamsk	1,038
16	Rodina Moscow	988
17	Chayka	987
18	Alania Vladivazkaz	475

== Managerial Changes ==
Club	Outgoing head coach	Reason for leaving	Time of leaving	New head coach	Date of appointment	Previous club / role
Alania	Yevgeny Kaleshin	Contract terminated	Pre-season period	Sultan Tazabayev (Note: In practice, the head coach duties were carried out by Soslan Beteev, who could not be officially registered as head coach due to not having the required licence.)	12 July 2024	Volga Ulyanovsk, senior coach
SKA-Khabarovsk	Roman Sharonov	Contract terminated	Pre-season period	Dmitry Voyetskiy	18 June 2024	—
Baltika	Sergei Ignashevich	Contract expired	Pre-season period	(Russia) Aleksandr Grishchenko	17 June 2024	Veles Moscow
Rodina	Fran Artiga	Contract expired	Pre-season period	Vladimir Gazzaev	12 June 2024	—
KAMAZ	Vladimir Klontsak	Akhmetzyanov begins studies for the PRO coaching licence	Pre-season period	Ildar Akhmetzyanov	11 July 2024	KAMAZ, senior coach
Chayka	Dmitry Pyatibratov	Contract terminated; move to Fakel	After Matchday 5	Yevgeny Kaleshin	15 August 2024	—
SKA-Khabarovsk	Dmitry Voyetskiy	Contract terminated	After Matchday 6	Aleksei Poddubsky (Note: In Matchdays 6–9 he served as caretaker head coach. He was confirmed as permanent head coach on 12 September.)	21 August 2024	SKA-Khabarovsk, senior coach
Chernomorets	Vadim Garanin	Contract terminated	After Matchday 7	Oleg Vasilenko	28 August 2024	Telavi (Georgia)
Rodina	Vladimir Gazzaev	Contract terminated	After Matchday 8	Filipp Sokolinsky (caretaker)	4 September 2024	Rodina-2, head coach
Baltika	Aleksandr Grishchenko	Contract terminated	After Matchday 8	Andrey Talalaev	6 September 2024	—
Alania	Sultan Tazabayev	Contract terminated	After Matchday 10	Spartak Gogniyev	17 September 2024	—
Rodina	Filipp Sokolinsky (caretaker)	End of caretaker period	After Matchday 13	Vladimir Beschastnykh (Note: In practice, the head coach duties continued to be performed by Filipp Sokolinsky, who could not be officially registered as head coach due to not having the required licence.)	8 October 2024	Rodina, forwards coach
Ural	Yevgeny Averyanov	Contract terminated	After Matchday 17	Oleg Shatov (caretaker)	6 November 2024	Ural, senior coach
Sokol	Aleksei Baga	Contract terminated	After Matchday 19	Aleksei Stukalov	19 November 2024	—
Shinnik	Dmitry Cheryshev	Contract terminated	After Matchday 21	Aleksandr Pobegalov (Note: In practice, the training process was led by Artyom Buloychik, who could not be officially registered as head coach due to not having the required licence.)	17 December 2024	Shinnik, sports coordinator
Ural	Oleg Shatov (caretaker)	End of caretaker period	After Matchday 21	Sergei Tomarov	14 January 2025	Ural, assistant coach
Ufa	Yevgeny Kharlachyov	Contract terminated	After Matchday 21	Omari Tetradze	18 January 2025	—
Rodina	Vladimir Beschastnykh	Contract terminated	After Matchday 21	Zoran Zeljković	24 February 2025	—
Sokol	Aleksei Stukalov	Contract terminated	After Matchday 26	Mladen Kašćelan	1 April 2025	—
Chayka	Yevgeny Kaleshin	Contract terminated	After Matchday 27	Sergei Pervushin	8 April 2025	Fakel Voronezh, assistant coach
Shinnik	Aleksandr Pobegalov	Start of Buloychik's PRO licence studies	After Matchday 27	Artyom Buloychik	11 April 2025	Shinnik, senior coach
