= 2019–20 PFC Sochi season =

PFC Sochi
2019–20 season
- Chairman: Dmitry Rubashko
- Manager: Aleksandr Tochilin (until 20 November); Roman Berezovsky (Caretaker) (11 November - 8 December 2019); Vladimir Fedotov (from 8 December 2019)
- Stadium: Fisht Olympic Stadium
- Premier League: 12th
- Russian Cup: Round of 32 vs Shinnik Yaroslavl
- Top goalscorer: League: Andrei Mostovoy (6); All: Andrei Mostovoy (6)
Away colours

The 2019–20 PFC Sochi season was their first season in the Russian Premier League, the highest tier of association football in Russia, and their second season as a club.

== Season review ==
On 5 November, Sochi announced that Erik Vardanyan would join the club from FC Pyunik on 1 January 2020.

On 20 November, Sochi announced that Aleksandr Tochilin had resigned as manager, and that Roman Berezovsky had been placed in temporary charge. On 8 December, Sochi announced Vladimir Fedotov as their new Manager on a 2 1/2-year contract.

On 21 January 2020, Russian Premier League club PFC Sochi announced that Kokorin would finish the 2019–20 season with them.

On 17 March, the Russian Premier League postponed all league fixtures until April 10 due to the COVID-19 pandemic.

On 1 April, the Russian Football Union extended the suspension of football until 31 May.

On 15 May, the Russian Football Union announced that the Russian Premier League season would resume on 21 June.

On 17 June, FC Rostov announced that six of their players had tested positive for COVID-19, resulting in Rostov's youth team travelling to play their fixture on 19 June.

On 16 July, the Russian Premier League announced that that day's game between Sochi and Tambov would not take place due to an outbreak of COVID-19 within the Sochi squad. Four days later, 20 July, the Russian Premier League announced that the final game of the season between Sochi and Krylia Sovetov also wouldn't take place due to COVID-19 situation within the Sochi team. On 21 July 2020, the Russian Football Union awarded the game 3–0 to Tambov. On 23 July, the RFU assigned Krylia Sovetov a 3–0 victory over Sochi in their cancelled game.

== Squad ==
Note: Flags indicate national team as defined under FIFA eligibility rules; some limited exceptions apply. Players may hold more than one non-FIFA nationality.

| No. | Pos. | Nation | Player |
|---|---|---|---|
| 5 | MF | RUS | Aleksei Pomerko |
| 8 | MF | RUS | Nikita Koldunov |
| 9 | FW | RUS | Anton Zabolotny |
| 10 | FW | RUS | Maksim Barsov |
| 12 | GK | RUS | Nikolai Zabolotny |
| 15 | DF | RUS | Ibragim Tsallagov |
| 16 | MF | ECU | Christian Noboa |
| 17 | FW | RUS | Andrei Mostovoy (on loan from Zenit St. Petersburg) |
| 18 | MF | RUS | Nikita Burmistrov |
| 20 | DF | RUS | Igor Yurganov |
| 21 | MF | KAZ | Akmal Bakhtiyarov |
| 24 | DF | RUS | Elmir Nabiullin |
| 25 | DF | RUS | Ivan Novoseltsev |
| 26 | DF | RUS | Nikita Kalugin |

| No. | Pos. | Nation | Player |
|---|---|---|---|
| 27 | DF | RUS | Kirill Zaika |
| 32 | DF | SLO | Miha Mevlja |
| 34 | DF | RUS | Timofei Margasov |
| 35 | GK | RUS | Soslan Dzhanayev |
| 45 | DF | SRB | Ivan Miladinović |
| 54 | MF | RUS | Anatoli Nemchenko |
| 77 | FW | RUS | Dmitry Poloz |
| 87 | FW | ARM | Aleksandre Karapetian |
| 90 | DF | RUS | Pavel Shakuro |
| 91 | FW | RUS | Aleksandr Kokorin (on loan from Zenit St. Petersburg) |
| 94 | MF | MNE | Dušan Lagator |
| 95 | MF | COD | Giannelli Imbula |
| — | MF | ARM | Erik Vardanyan |

=== Out on loan ===
Note: Flags indicate national team as defined under FIFA eligibility rules; some limited exceptions apply. Players may hold more than one non-FIFA nationality.

| No. | Pos. | Nation | Player |
|---|---|---|---|
| — | GK | RUS | Rostislav Soldatenko (at Alania Vladikavkaz) |
| — | FW | NGR | Steven Alfred (at Pyunik) |

| No. | Pos. | Nation | Player |
|---|---|---|---|
| — | FW | RUS | Pavel Ryabokon (at Dolgoprudny) |

== Transfers ==
=== In ===
| Date | Position | Nationality | Name | From | Fee | Ref. |
|---|---|---|---|---|---|---|
| Summer 2019 | GK | (Russia) | Yegor Kabakov | | | |
| Summer 2019 | GK | (Russia) | Sergey Samok | | | |
| Summer 2019 | GK | (Russia) | Maksim Semyonov | | | |
| Summer 2019 | DF | (Russia) | Maks Dziov | | | |
| Summer 2019 | DF | (Russia) | Vadim Ivlev | | | |
| Summer 2019 | DF | (Russia) | Pavel Korkin | Rubin Kazan | Undisclosed | |
| Summer 2019 | DF | (Russia) | Roman Kvataniya | Lokomotiv Moscow | Undisclosed | |
| Summer 2019 | DF | (Russia) | Timofei Margasov | Lokomotiv Moscow | Undisclosed | |
| Summer 2019 | DF | (Russia) | Vadim Milyutin | | | |
| Summer 2019 | DF | (Russia) | Roman Ponomarenko | | | |
| Summer 2019 | DF | (Russia) | Semyon Surinovich | | | |
| Summer 2019 | DF | (Russia) | Sergei Voropayev | | | |
| Summer 2019 | MF | (Russia) | Stepan Batyutin | | | |
| Summer 2019 | MF | (Russia) | Daniyar Bikmukhamedov | | | |
| Summer 2019 | MF | (Russia) | Luchano Bobrov | Khimki-M | Undisclosed | |
| Summer 2019 | MF | (Russia) | Ilya Gorbashov | | | |
| Summer 2019 | MF | (Russia) | Viktor Gryazin | Krylia Sovetov Samara | Undisclosed | |
| Summer 2019 | MF | (Russia) | Maksim Kolmakov | | | |
| Summer 2019 | MF | (Russia) | Artur Koloskov | | | |
| Summer 2019 | MF | (Russia) | Timofey Kostenko | | | |
| Summer 2019 | MF | (Russia) | Aleksei Logvinov | | | |
| Summer 2019 | MF | (Russia) | Nikita Molochnikov | | | |
| Summer 2019 | MF | (Russia) | Yegor Prutsev | | | |
| Summer 2019 | MF | (Russia) | Vikentiy Shchipachyov | | | |
| Summer 2019 | FW | (Russia) | Vladislav Makeyev | | | |
| Summer 2019 | FW | (Russia) | Ilya Predeus | | | |
| 21 June 2019 | DF | (Russia) | Pavel Shakuro | Tyumen | Undisclosed | |
| 29 June 2019 | GK | (Russia) | Yevgeny Frolov | Orenburg | Undisclosed | |
| 2 July 2019 | DF | (Russia) | Ivan Novoseltsev | Zenit St. Petersburg | Undisclosed | |
| 2 July 2019 | DF | (Russia) | Ibragim Tsallagov | Zenit St. Petersburg | Undisclosed | |
| 4 July 2019 | FW | (Russia) | Vladimir Obukhov | Mordovia Saransk | Undisclosed | |
| 4 July 2019 | FW | (Russia) | Dmitry Poloz | Zenit St. Petersburg | Undisclosed | |
| 8 July 2019 | GK | (Russia) | Elmir Nabiullin | Zenit St. Petersburg | Undisclosed | |
| 12 July 2019 | DF | (Russia) | Fyodor Kudryashov | İstanbul Başakşehir | Undisclosed | |
| 12 July 2019 | FW | (Armenia) | Aleksandre Karapetian | Progrès Niederkorn | Undisclosed | |
| 16 July 2019 | GK | (Russia) | Soslan Dzhanayev | Miedź Legnica | Undisclosed | |
| 5 August 2019 | MF | (Ecuador) | Christian Noboa | Zenit St. Petersburg | Undisclosed | |
| 5 August 2019 | FW | (Russia) | Anton Zabolotny | Zenit St. Petersburg | Undisclosed | |
| 2 September 2019 | DF | (Slovenia) | Miha Mevlja | Zenit St. Petersburg | Undisclosed | |
| 5 November 2019† | MF | (Armenia) | Erik Vardanyan | Pyunik | Undisclosed | |
| 22 February 2020 | DF | (France) | Adil Rami | Fenerbahçe | Undisclosed | |
| 3 March 2020 | MF | (Democratic Republic of the Congo) | Giannelli Imbula | Stoke City | Free | |

† Vardanyan's transfer was announced on the above date, becoming official on 1 January 2020.

=== Loans in ===
| Date from | Position | Nationality | Name | From | Date to | Ref. |
|---|---|---|---|---|---|---|
| 19 July 2019 | MF | (Russia) | Andrei Mostovoy | Zenit St. Petersburg | End of Season | |
| 17 February 2020 | FW | (Russia) | Aleksandr Kokorin | Zenit St. Petersburg | End of Season | |

=== Out ===
| Date | Position | Nationality | Name | To | Fee | Ref. |
|---|---|---|---|---|---|---|
| Summer 2019 | GK | (Russia) | Andrei Zaytsev | Chernomorets Novorossiysk | Undisclosed | |
| Summer 2019 | DF | (Russia) | Valeri Pochivalin | Khimki | Undisclosed | |
| Summer 2019 | MF | (Russia) | Yan Kazayev | Baltika Kaliningrad | Undisclosed | |
| 11 June 2019 | MF | (Russia) | Igor Gorbunov | Rotor Volgograd | Undisclosed | |
| 4 July 2019 | MF | (Russia) | Roman Kosyanchuk | Fakel Voronezh | Undisclosed | |
| 24 June 2019 | DF | (Russia) | Andrei Bychkov | Chayka Peschanokopskoye | Undisclosed | |
| 2 September 2019 | MF | (Russia) | Yevgeni Pesegov | Rotor Volgograd | Undisclosed | |
| 2 February 2020 | GK | (Russia) | Yevgeny Frolov | Krylia Sovetov | Undisclosed | |

=== Loans out ===
| Date from | Position | Nationality | Name | To | Date to | Ref. |
|---|---|---|---|---|---|---|
| 5 July 2019 | FW | (Nigeria) | Steven Alfred | Pyunik | Undisclosed | |
| 16 July 2019 | GK | (Russia) | Rostislav Soldatenko | Alania Vladikavkaz | End of Season | |

=== Released ===
| Date | Position | Nationality | Name | Joined | Date |
|---|---|---|---|---|---|
| Summer 2019 | MF | (Russia) | Nikita Salamatov | Luch Vladivostok | |
| 2 September 2019 | DF | (Russia) | Vladimir Obukhov | Tambov | 2 September 2019 |
| 18 December 2019 | DF | (Russia) | Fyodor Kudryashov | Antalyaspor | 6 January 2020 |
| 28 May 2020 | DF | (France) | Adil Rami | Boavista | 4 September 2020 |
| 29 July 2020 | MF | (Democratic Republic of the Congo) | Giannelli Imbula | | |
| 30 July 2020 | MF | (Montenegro) | Dušan Lagator | Wisła Płock | 11 August 2020 |
| 31 July 2020 | FW | (Armenia) | Aleksandre Karapetian | Tambov | 3 August 2020 |

== Friendlies ==
| 8 September 2019 | Zenit St. Petersburg | 2 – 1 | Sochi | Saint Petersburg, Russia |
| 14:00 MSK (UTC+3) | Sutormin 3'; Bachinsky 22' | | Burmistrov 36' | Stadium: Stadion SDYuShOR Smena; Attendance: 1,868 |

| 19 January 2020 | Chindia Târgoviște (Romania) | 0 – 0 | (Russia) Sochi | Belek, Turkey |
| 16:00 MSK (UTC+3) | | Report |

| 22 January 2020 | St. Pölten (Austria) | 0 – 0 | (Russia) Sochi | Belek, Turkey |
| 16:00 MSK (UTC+3) | | Report |

| 29 January 2020 | Cracovia (Poland) | 0 – 0 | (Russia) Sochi | Belek, Turkey |
| 17:00 MSK (UTC+3) | | Report |

| 1 February 2020 | Spartak Trnava (Slovakia) | 2 – 2 | (Russia) Sochi | Belek, Turkey |
| 17:00 MSK (UTC+3) | Yao 10'; Orlandić 33' | Report | Nabiullin 40'; Tsallagov 51' |

| 7 February 2020 | Yenisey Krasnoyarsk | 2 – 1 | Sochi | Belek, Turkey |
| 11:00 MSK (UTC+3) | Rudnev 75'; 80' | Report | Lagator 42' |

| 7 February 2020 | BATE Borisov (Belarus) | 1 – 1 | (Russia) Sochi | Belek, Turkey |
| 16:00 MSK (UTC+3) | Milić 90' | Report | Burmistrov 80' |

| 14 February 2020 | Sochi | 2 – 2 | Akhmat Grozny | Belek, Turkey |
| 17:00 MSK (UTC+3) | Berisha 72'; Ilyin 78' | Report | Poloz 10'; Mostovoy 11' |

| 17 February 2020 | Dynamo Moscow | 1 – 3 | Sochi | Belek, Turkey |
| 17:00 MSK (UTC+3) | Szymański 5' | Report | Kokorin 51', 80'; Noboa 55' |

| 20 February 2020 | Sochi (Russia) | 3 – 1 | (Kazakhstan) Astana | Belek, Turkey |
| 17:00 MSK (UTC+3) | Mostovoy 23', 86'; Burmistrov 36' | Report | Sigurjónsson 64' |

== Competitions ==
=== Premier League ===
==== Results by round ====
| Round | 1 | 2 | 3 | 4 | 5 | 6 | 7 | 8 | 9 | 10 | 11 | 12 | 13 | 14 | 15 | 16 | 17 | 18 | 19 | 20 | 21 | 22 | 23 | 24 | 25 | 26 | 27 | 28 | 29 | 30 |
|---|---|---|---|---|---|---|---|---|---|---|---|---|---|---|---|---|---|---|---|---|---|---|---|---|---|---|---|---|---|---|
| Ground | A | H | A | H | A | A | A | A | H | A | H | H | A | A | H | H | A | H | H | H | H | H | H | A | H | A | A | H | A | A |
| Result | L | L | L | D | D | D | L | W | L | W | W | L | D | L | L | L | D | D | L | W | W | W | W | D | D | D | L | W | L | L |
| Position | 15 | 16 | 16 | 15 | 15 | 15 | 15 | 14 | 15 | 13 | 10 | 13 | 13 | 14 | 16 | 16 | 16 | 16 | 16 | 16 | 14 | 12 | 10 | 11 | 10 | 11 | 12 | 12 | 12 | 12 |

Updated to match(es) played on 23 July 2020. Source: See Results
A = Away; H = Home; W = Win; D = Draw; L = Loss

==== Results ====
| 13 July 2019 1 | Spartak Moscow | 1 – 0 | Sochi | Moscow |
| 19:00 MSK (UTC+3) | Lomovitsky (yellow card) 14'; Rasskazov (yellow card) 56'; Ponce (yellow card) 72'; Luiz Adriano (yellow card) 76'; Gigot 90+3' | Report | Tsallagov (yellow card) 42'; Novoseltsev (yellow card) 68' | Stadium: Otkritie Arena; Attendance: 29,892; Referee: Vladimir Moskalyov |

| 21 July 2019 2 | Sochi | 0 – 2 | Zenit St. Petersburg | Sochi |
| 21:30 MSK (UTC+3) | Miladinović (yellow card) 29'; Novoseltsev (yellow card) 43' | Report | Azmoun 30' (pen.); Ozdoyev 88' | Stadium: Fisht Olympic Stadium; Attendance: 35,102; Referee: Aleksei Matyunin |

| 27 July 2019 3 | Krasnodar | 3 – 0 | Sochi | Krasnodar |
| 19:00 MSK (UTC+3) | Ignatyev 14', 42'; Ari (yellow card) 32'; Suleymanov 80'; Kambolov (yellow card) 86' | Report | Nabiullin (yellow card) 25' (yellow-red card) 77'; Tsallagov (yellow card) 53' | Stadium: Krasnodar Stadium; Attendance: 32,177; Referee: Sergey Lapochkin |

| 4 August 2019 4 | Sochi | 0 – 0 | Ufa | Sochi |
| 21:30 MSK (UTC+3) | Kudryashov (yellow card) 19'; Miladinović (yellow card) 42' | Report | Fomin (yellow card) 73'; Belenov (yellow card) 90+1' | Stadium: Fisht Olympic Stadium; Attendance: 11,100; Referee: Aleksey Sukhoy |

| 11 August 2019 5 | CSKA Moscow | 0 – 0 | Sochi | Moscow |
| 19:00 MSK (UTC+3) | Oblyakov (yellow card) 41' | Report | Dzhanayev (yellow card) 42'; Kudryashov (yellow card) 49'; Karapetian (yellow card) 66' | Stadium: VEB Arena; Attendance: 17,995; Referee: Vitaly Meshkov |

| 16 August 2019 6 | Orenburg | 1 – 1 | Sochi | Orenburg |
| 18:00 MSK (UTC+3) | Ayupov (yellow card) 22'; Miškić (yellow card) 42'; Kalugin 46' (o.g.); Despotović (yellow card) 84' | Report | Novoseltsev (yellow card) 19'; Tsallagov (yellow card) 63'; Poloz 68' (pen.); Noboa (yellow card) 90+2' | Stadium: Gazovik Stadium; Attendance: 4,411; Referee: Mikhail Vilkov |

| 26 August 2019 7 | Ural Yekaterinburg | 3 – 1 | Sochi | Yekaterinburg |
| 18:00 MSK (UTC+3) | Bicfalvi 16' (pen.); Haroyan (yellow card) 45+2'; Panyukov 73'; Dimitrov (yellow card) 79' (goal) 84' | Report | Nabiullin (yellow card) 37'; A. Zabolotny 43' | Stadium: Central Stadium; Attendance: 10,171; Referee: Sergei Karasev |

| 31 August 2019 8 | Rubin Kazan | 0 – 3 | Sochi | Kazan |
| 14:00 MSK (UTC+3) | Bashkirov (yellow card) 15'; Davitashvili (yellow card) 20'; Stepanov (yellow card) 71' | Report | Tsallagov 22'; Lagator (yellow card) 29'; Burmistrov (yellow card) 37'; Kudryashov 52'; Zabolotny (yellow card) 76'; Karapetian 90+3' | Stadium: Kazan Arena; Attendance: 8,845; Referee: Nikolay Voloshin |

| 14 September 2019 9 | Sochi | 0 – 1 | Lokomotiv Moscow | Sochi |
| 19:00 MSK (UTC+3) | Tsallagov (yellow card) 38'; Yurganov (yellow card) 62'; Lagator (yellow card) 90+3' | Report | Krychowiak 20'; Zhivoglyadov (yellow card) 42'; Barinov (yellow card) 45' | Stadium: Fisht Olympic Stadium; Attendance: 13,900; Referee: Igor Panin |

| 22 September 2019 10 | Dynamo Moscow | 2 – 3 | Sochi | Moscow |
| 14:00 MSK (UTC+3) | Igboun 50', 63'; Joãozinho (yellow card) 58' | Report | Zabolotny 31' (yellow card) 56'; Mevlja 65'; Lagator (yellow card) 88'; Karapetian 90' | Stadium: VTB Arena; Attendance: 10,119; Referee: Sergey Lapochkin |

| 30 September 2019 11 | Sochi | 2 – 0 | Akhmat Grozny | Sochi |
| 19:30 MSK (UTC+3) | Mostovoy 12' (yellow card) 34'; Pomerko (yellow card) 41'; Noboa 73' (yellow card) 74'; Miladinović (yellow card) 78'; Karapetian (yellow card) 87'; Nabiullin (yellow card) 90+3' | Report | Nižić (yellow card) 62' | Stadium: Fisht Olympic Stadium; Attendance: 7,127; Referee: Aleksei Eskov |

| 5 October 2019 12 | Sochi | 0 – 2 | Krylia Sovetov | Sochi |
| 19:00 MSK (UTC+3) | Pomerko (yellow card) 21'; Lagator (yellow card) 51'; Kudryashov (yellow card) 67'; Tsallagov (yellow card) 76' | Report | Sobolev 4', 69' (yellow card) 34' (penalty missed) 61'; Mijailović (yellow card) 22' | Stadium: Fisht Olympic Stadium; Attendance: 7,923; Referee: Aleksei Matyunin |

| 20 October 2019 13 | Arsenal Tula | 1 – 1 | Sochi | Tula |
| 16:30 MSK (UTC+3) | Lutsenko (penalty missed) 27' (yellow card) 31'; Bauer (yellow card) 42'; Lomovitsky 43' (pen.) (penalty missed) 54'; Kangwa (yellow card) 57'; Belyayev (yellow card) 60' | Report | Zabolotny (yellow card) 1'; Mostovoy 6'; Kudryashov (yellow card) 42' (yellow-red card) 64'; Kalugin (yellow card) 45+1'; Miladinović (yellow card) 62'; Burmistrov (yellow card) 66' | Stadium: Arsenal Stadium; Attendance: 11,475; Referee: Vitali Meshkov |

| 26 October 2019 14 | Rostov | 2 – 0 | Sochi | Rostov-on-Don |
| 19:00 MSK (UTC+3) | Eremenko 41'; Nabiullin 79' (o.g.); Popov (yellow card) 88'; Glebov (yellow card) 90+1' | Report | | Stadium: Rostov Arena; Attendance: 33,716; Referee: Evgeny Turbin |

| 2 November 2019 15 | Sochi | 1 – 2 | Tambov | Sochi |
| 16:30 MSK (UTC+3) | Pomerko (yellow card) 28'; Miladinović (yellow card) 33'; Noboa 44'; Kalugin (yellow card) 64' | Report | Kostyukov 41'; Melkadze 56' (yellow card) 71'; Kilin (yellow card) 90+1' | Stadium: Fisht Olympic Stadium; Attendance: 6,138; Referee: Nikolay Voloshin |

| 10 November 2019 16 | Sochi | 2 – 3 | CSKA Moscow | Sochi |
| 16:30 MSK (UTC+3) | Mostovoy 7'; Poloz 45+2' (pen.); Dzhanayev (yellow card) 52'; Lagator (yellow card) 59'; Kudryashov (yellow card) 87' | Report | Mevlja 16' (o.g.); Diveyev (yellow card) 18'; Karpov (yellow card) 21'; Oblyakov 52' (yellow card) 74'; Chalov 55'; Bistrović (yellow card) 90+1' | Stadium: Fisht Olympic Stadium; Attendance: 15,318; Referee: Stanislav Vasilyev |

| 24 November 2019 17 | Ufa | 1 – 1 | Sochi | Ufa |
| 11:30 MSK (UTC+3) | Fomin (yellow card) 38'; Krotov (yellow card) 49'; Sukhov (yellow card) 60'; Vombergar 85' | Report | Tsallagov (yellow card) 9'; Poloz 25'; Burmistrov (yellow card) 49' | Stadium: Neftyanik Stadium; Attendance: 4,198; Referee: Aleksei Matyunin |

| 1 December 2019 18 | Sochi | – | Orenburg | Sochi |
| 14:00 MSK (UTC+3) | | | | Stadium: Fisht Olympic Stadium |
Note: Match postponed due to a viral infection in the Sochi squad.

| 8 December 2019 19 | Sochi | 1 – 1 | Rubin Kazan | Sochi |
| 16:30 MSK (UTC+3) | Lagator 39'; Koldunov (yellow card) 63' | Report | Markov 49' (yellow card) 85' | Stadium: Fisht Olympic Stadium; Attendance: 6,104; Referee: Sergey Lapochkin |

| 1 March 2019 20 | Sochi | 1 – 2 | Arsenal Tula | Sochi |
| 19:00 MSK (UTC+3) | Burmistrov (yellow card) 28'; Zaika (yellow card) 51'; Kokorin 64' | Report | Lutsenko 5', 90+5'; Kostadinov (yellow card) 74'; Levashov (yellow card) 90+4' | Stadium: Fisht Olympic Stadium; Attendance: 5,720; Referee: Vladislav Bezborodov |

| 8 March 2020 21 | Sochi | 2 – 0 | Ural Yekaterinburg | Sochi |
| 16:30 MSK (UTC+3) | Mostovoy 35'; Zaika 63'; Tsallagov (yellow card) 90' | Report | Boumal (yellow card) 70'; Bicfalvi (yellow card) 87' | Stadium: Fisht Olympic Stadium; Attendance: 5,051; Referee: Mikhail Vilkov |

| 11 March 2020 18 | Sochi | 5 – 1 | Orenburg | Sochi |
| 19:30 MSK (UTC+3) | Ayupov 24' (o.g.); Kokorin 35' (pen.), 62'; Mostovoy 73'; Noboa (yellow card) 78' | Report | Fameyeh 84' (yellow card) 87' | Stadium: Fisht Olympic Stadium; Attendance: 5,147; Referee: Evgeny Turbin |
Note: Match originally scheduled for 1 December 2019 but postponed due to a viral infection in the Sochi squad.

| 15 March 2020 22 | Sochi | 2 – 0 | Krasnodar | Sochi |
| 14:00 MSK (UTC+3) | Noboa 47' (yellow card) 64'; Tsallagov (yellow card) 90'; Mostovoy 90+3' | Report | Suleymanov (yellow card) 90' | Stadium: Fisht Olympic Stadium; Referee: Sergey Ivanov |

| 19 June 2020 23 | Sochi | 10 – 1 | Rostov | Sochi |
| 20:00 MSK (UTC+3) | Abramov (o.g.); Kokorin 15', 44', 51'; Zabolotny (penalty missed) 26' 45+1', 47'; Margasov (yellow card) 38'; Burmistrov (yellow card) 42'; Novoseltsev 53'; Poloz 74', 86'; Koldunov 87' | Report | Romanov 1'; Girnyk (yellow card) 26'; Topuria (yellow card) 43'; Gorelov (yellow card) 63' | Stadium: Fisht Olympic Stadium; Referee: Aleksey Sukhoy |
Note: Match originally scheduled for 20 March, but postponed on 17 March due to the COVID-19 pandemic. Rostov fielded their youth team due to their first team being placed in quarantine.

| 26 June 2020 24 | Akhmat Grozny | 1 – 1 | Sochi | Grozny |
| 18:00 MSK (UTC+3) | Ivanov (yellow card) 31'; Glushakov 33' | Report | Margasov (yellow card) 10'; Burmistrov 45+1' | Stadium: Akhmat-Arena; Referee: Sergei Karasev |
Note: Match originally scheduled for 5 April, but postponed on 17 March due to the COVID-19 pandemic.

| 1 July 2020 25 | Sochi | 1 – 1 | Dynamo Moscow | Sochi |
| 20:00 MSK (UTC+3) | Tsallagov (yellow card) 36'; Mevlja (yellow card) 56'; Miladinović (yellow card) 56'; Mostovoy (yellow card) 62'; Kokorin 90+2' (pen.) | Report | Šunjić (yellow card) 4' (yellow-red card) 73'; Ordets (yellow card) 45+1'; Komlichenko 57' (pen.) (yellow card) 80'; Morozov (yellow card) 90+1' | Stadium: Fisht Olympic Stadium; Referee: Igor Panin |
Note: Match originally scheduled for 11 April, but postponed on 1 April due to the COVID-19 pandemic.

| 4 July 2020 26 | Lokomotiv Moscow | 0 – 0 | Sochi | Moscow |
| 20:30 MSK (UTC+3) | An.Miranchuk (yellow card) 10'; Zhemaletdinov (yellow card) 16'; Zhivoglyadov (yellow card) 69'; Krychowiak (yellow card) 89'; Al.Miranchuk (penalty missed) 90+8' | Report | Burmistrov (yellow card) 29'; Nabiullin (yellow card) 47'; Zaika (yellow card) 57'; Kokorin (yellow card) 83' | Stadium: RZD Arena; Referee: Aleksei Matyunin |
Note: Match originally scheduled for 17 April, but postponed on 1 April due to the COVID-19 pandemic.

| 8 July 2020 27 | Zenit St.Petersburg | 2 – 1 | Sochi | Saint Petersburg |
| 18:30 MSK (UTC+3) | Dzyuba (yellow card) 2'; Musayev (yellow card) 4'; Malcom 33'; Azmoun 76' | Report | Zabolotny 5' (yellow card) 6'; Tsallagov (yellow card) 26'; Poloz (yellow card) 42' | Stadium: Krestovsky Stadium; Referee: Evgeny Turbin |
Note: Match originally scheduled for 26 April, but postponed on 1 April due to the COVID-19 pandemic.

| 11 July 2020 28 | Sochi | 1 – 0 | Spartak Moscow | Sochi |
| 20:30 MSK (UTC+3) | Zaika (yellow card) 9'; Mevlja (yellow card) 19'; Maslov 24' (o.g.); Poloz (yellow card) 41'; Margasov (yellow card) 63'; Kokorin (yellow card) 90+2' | Report | Ayrton (yellow card) 30'; Umyarov (yellow card) 50'; Rebrov (yellow card) 85'; Mirzov (yellow card) 88' | Stadium: Fisht Olympic Stadium; Referee: Sergey Ivanov |
Note: Match originally scheduled for 1 May, but postponed on 1 April due to the COVID-19 pandemic.

| 16 July 2020 29 | Tambov | 3 – 0 | Sochi | Nizhny Novgorod |
| 20:30 MSK (UTC+3) | | | | Stadium: Nizhny Novgorod Stadium |
Note: Match played at the Nizhny Novgorod Stadium in Nizhny Novgorod instead of Tambov's regular Spartak Stadium. Match originally scheduled for 6 May, but postponed on 1 April due to the COVID-19 pandemic. Match postponed for a second time on 16 July due to COVID-19 within the Sochi squad, and awarded as a 3-0 win to Tambov on 21 July.

| 22 July 2020 30 | Krylia Sovetov | 3 – 0 | Sochi | Samara |
| 19:00 MSK (UTC+3) | | | | Stadium: Samara Arena |
Note: Match originally scheduled for 17 May, but postponed on 1 April due to the COVID-19 pandemic. Match postponed for a second time on 20 July due to COVID-19 within the Sochi squad, and awarded to Krylia Sovetov on 23 July.

==== League table ====
| Pos | Team | Pld | W | D | L | GF | GA | GD | Pts |
|---|---|---|---|---|---|---|---|---|---|
| 10 | Rubin Kazan | 30 | 8 | 11 | 11 | 18 | 28 | −10 | 35 (Note: Head-to-head points: Rubin Kazan 4, Ural 1) |
| 11 | Ural | 30 | 9 | 8 | 13 | 36 | 53 | −17 | 35 |
| 12 | Sochi | 30 | 8 | 9 | 13 | 40 | 39 | +1 | 33 |
| 13 | Akhmat Grozny | 30 | 7 | 10 | 13 | 27 | 46 | −19 | 31 (Note: Head-to-head points: Akhmat Grozny 8, Tambov 4, Krylia Sovetov Samara 4. Head-to-head goal difference: Akhmat Grozny +3, Tambov 0, Krylia Sovetov Samara –3) |
| 14 | Tambov | 30 | 9 | 4 | 17 | 37 | 41 | −4 | 31 |

Source: Russian Premier Liga, Soccerway
Rules for classification: 1) Points; 2) Head-to-head points; 3) Head-to-head matches won; 4) Head-to-head goal difference; 5) Head-to-head goals scored; 6) Matches won; 7) Goal difference; 8) Goals scored; 9) Play-off.

=== Russian Cup ===
| 25 September 2019 Round of 32 | Shinnik Yaroslavl | 0 – 0 (a.e.t.) (5–4 p) | Sochi | Yaroslavl |
| 18:30 MSK (UTC+3) | Shcherbakov (yellow card) 47' | Report | Miladinović (yellow card) 85'; Pomerko (yellow card) 88' | Stadium: Shinnik Stadium; Attendance: 2,850; Referee: Pavel Shadyhanov |
| | Penalties |
| | Nizamutdinov (penalty scored); Viznovich (penalty missed); Shcherbakov (penalty scored); Kozhemyakin (penalty scored); Pukhov (penalty scored); Oleynikov (penalty scored) | | Zabolotny (penalty scored); Miladinović (penalty scored); Lagator (penalty missed); Mostovoy (penalty scored); Burmistrov (penalty scored); Poloz (penalty missed) |

== Squad statistics ==
As of match played 11 July 2020

=== Appearances and goals ===
| No. | Pos | Nat | Player | Total | | Premier League | | Russian Cup | |
| No. | Pos | Nat | Player | Apps | Goals | Apps | Goals | Apps | Goals |
|---|---|---|---|---|---|---|---|---|---|
| 5 | MF | (Russia) RUS | Aleksei Pomerko | 11 | 0 | 8+2 | 0 | 1 | 0 |
| 8 | MF | (Russia) RUS | Nikita Koldunov | 2 | 1 | 0+2 | 1 | 0 | 0 |
| 9 | FW | (Russia) RUS | Anton Zabolotny | 22 | 5 | 16+5 | 5 | 0+1 | 0 |
| 12 | GK | (Russia) RUS | Nikolai Zabolotny | 5 | 0 | 5 | 0 | 0 | 0 |
| 15 | DF | (Russia) RUS | Ibragim Tsallagov | 27 | 1 | 25+1 | 1 | 1 | 0 |
| 16 | MF | (Ecuador) ECU | Christian Noboa | 19 | 4 | 18+1 | 4 | 0 | 0 |
| 17 | MF | (Russia) RUS | Andrei Mostovoy | 26 | 6 | 24+1 | 6 | 0+1 | 0 |
| 18 | MF | (Russia) RUS | Nikita Burmistrov | 24 | 1 | 19+4 | 1 | 1 | 0 |
| 20 | DF | (Russia) RUS | Igor Yurganov | 9 | 0 | 6+3 | 0 | 0 | 0 |
| 21 | MF | (Kazakhstan) KAZ | Akmal Bakhtiyarov | 3 | 0 | 0+2 | 0 | 1 | 0 |
| 24 | DF | (Russia) RUS | Elmir Nabiullin | 21 | 0 | 13+7 | 0 | 1 | 0 |
| 25 | DF | (Russia) RUS | Ivan Novoseltsev | 19 | 1 | 18 | 1 | 1 | 0 |
| 26 | DF | (Russia) RUS | Nikita Kalugin | 16 | 0 | 13+3 | 0 | 0 | 0 |
| 27 | DF | (Russia) RUS | Kirill Zaika | 10 | 1 | 10 | 1 | 0 | 0 |
| 32 | DF | (Slovenia) SLO | Miha Mevlja | 20 | 1 | 19 | 1 | 1 | 0 |
| 34 | DF | (Russia) RUS | Timofei Margasov | 15 | 0 | 12+3 | 0 | 0 | 0 |
| 35 | GK | (Russia) RUS | Soslan Dzhanayev | 22 | 0 | 22 | 0 | 0 | 0 |
| 45 | DF | (Serbia) SRB | Ivan Miladinović | 23 | 0 | 22 | 0 | 1 | 0 |
| 56 | DF | (Russia) RUS | Vadim Milyutin | 1 | 0 | 0+1 | 0 | 0 | 0 |
| 58 | FW | (Russia) RUS | Andrei Bokovoy | 2 | 0 | 0+2 | 0 | 0 | 0 |
| 77 | FW | (Russia) RUS | Dmitry Poloz | 25 | 5 | 14+10 | 5 | 0+1 | 0 |
| 87 | FW | (Armenia) ARM | Aleksandre Karapetian | 22 | 2 | 3+18 | 2 | 1 | 0 |
| 90 | DF | (Russia) RUS | Pavel Shakuro | 3 | 0 | 1+1 | 0 | 1 | 0 |
| 91 | FW | (Russia) RUS | Aleksandr Kokorin | 10 | 7 | 10 | 7 | 0 | 0 |
| 94 | MF | (Montenegro) MNE | Dušan Lagator | 14 | 1 | 6+7 | 1 | 0+1 | 0 |
| 95 | MF | (Democratic Republic of the Congo) COD | Giannelli Imbula | 1 | 0 | 0+1 | 0 | 0 | 0 |
Players away from the club on loan:
Players who appeared for Sochi but left during the season:
| 7 | MF | (Russia) RUS | Yevgeni Pesegov | 4 | 0 | 4 | 0 | 0 | 0 |
| 11 | FW | (Russia) RUS | Vladimir Obukhov | 3 | 0 | 1+2 | 0 | 0 | 0 |
| 13 | DF | (Russia) RUS | Fyodor Kudryashov | 16 | 1 | 15+1 | 1 | 0 | 0 |
| 19 | GK | (Russia) RUS | Yevgeny Frolov | 2 | 0 | 1 | 0 | 1 | 0 |
| 55 | MF | (Russia) RUS | Yan Kazayev | 4 | 0 | 3+1 | 0 | 0 | 0 |

=== Goal scorers ===
| Place | Position | Nation | Number | Name | Premier League | Russian Cup | Total |
|---|---|---|---|---|---|---|---|
| 1 | FW | (Russia) | 91 | Aleksandr Kokorin | 7 | 0 | 7 |
| 2 | MF | (Russia) | 17 | Andrei Mostovoy | 6 | 0 | 6 |
| 3 | FW | (Russia) | 77 | Dmitry Poloz | 5 | 0 | 5 |
| 3 | FW | (Russia) | 9 | Anton Zabolotny | 5 | 0 | 5 |
| 5 | MF | (Ecuador) | 16 | Christian Noboa | 4 | 0 | 4 |
| 6 | | | | Own goal | 3 | 0 | 3 |
| 7 | FW | (Armenia) | 87 | Aleksandre Karapetian | 2 | 0 | 2 |
| 7 | DF | (Russia) | 13 | Fyodor Kudryashov | 1 | 0 | 1 |
| 7 | DF | (Russia) | 15 | Ibragim Tsallagov | 1 | 0 | 1 |
| 7 | DF | (Slovenia) | 32 | Miha Mevlja | 1 | 0 | 1 |
| 7 | MF | (Montenegro) | 94 | Dušan Lagator | 1 | 0 | 1 |
| 7 | DF | (Russia) | 27 | Kirill Zaika | 1 | 0 | 1 |
| 7 | DF | (Russia) | 25 | Ivan Novoseltsev | 1 | 0 | 1 |
| 7 | MF | (Russia) | 8 | Nikita Koldunov | 1 | 0 | 1 |
| 7 | MF | (Russia) | 18 | Nikita Burmistrov | 1 | 0 | 1 |
| Total | | | | | 40 | 0 | 40 |

=== Clean sheets ===
| Place | Position | Nation | Number | Name | Premier League | Russian Cup | Total |
|---|---|---|---|---|---|---|---|
| 1 | GK | (Russia) | 35 | Soslan Dzhanayev | 7 | 0 | 7 |
| 2 | GK | (Russia) | 12 | Nikolai Zabolotny | 1 | 0 | 1 |
| 2 | GK | (Russia) | 19 | Yevgeny Frolov | 0 | 1 | 1 |
| Total | | | | | 7 | 1 | 8 |

=== Disciplinary record ===
| Number | Nation | Position | Name | Premier League | | Russian Cup | | Total | |
| Number | Nation | Position | Name | Yellow card | Red card | Yellow card | Red card | Yellow card | Red card |
|---|---|---|---|---|---|---|---|---|---|
| 5 | (Russia) | MF | Aleksei Pomerko | 2 | 0 | 1 | 0 | 3 | 0 |
| 8 | (Russia) | MF | Nikita Koldunov | 1 | 0 | 0 | 0 | 1 | 0 |
| 9 | (Russia) | FW | Anton Zabolotny | 4 | 0 | 0 | 0 | 4 | 0 |
| 15 | (Russia) | DF | Ibragim Tsallagov | 10 | 0 | 0 | 0 | 10 | 0 |
| 16 | (Ecuador) | MF | Christian Noboa | 3 | 0 | 0 | 0 | 3 | 0 |
| 17 | (Russia) | MF | Andrei Mostovoy | 2 | 0 | 0 | 0 | 2 | 0 |
| 18 | (Russia) | MF | Nikita Burmistrov | 6 | 0 | 0 | 0 | 6 | 0 |
| 20 | (Russia) | DF | Igor Yurganov | 1 | 0 | 0 | 0 | 1 | 0 |
| 24 | (Russia) | DF | Elmir Nabiullin | 5 | 1 | 0 | 0 | 5 | 1 |
| 25 | (Russia) | DF | Ivan Novoseltsev | 3 | 0 | 0 | 0 | 3 | 0 |
| 26 | (Russia) | DF | Nikita Kalugin | 2 | 0 | 0 | 0 | 2 | 0 |
| 27 | (Russia) | DF | Kirill Zaika | 3 | 0 | 0 | 0 | 3 | 0 |
| 32 | (Slovenia) | DF | Miha Mevlja | 2 | 0 | 0 | 0 | 2 | 0 |
| 34 | (Russia) | DF | Timofei Margasov | 3 | 0 | 0 | 0 | 3 | 0 |
| 35 | (Russia) | GK | Soslan Dzhanayev | 2 | 0 | 0 | 0 | 2 | 0 |
| 45 | (Serbia) | DF | Ivan Miladinović | 6 | 0 | 1 | 0 | 7 | 0 |
| 77 | (Russia) | FW | Dmitry Poloz | 2 | 0 | 0 | 0 | 2 | 0 |
| 87 | (Armenia) | FW | Aleksandre Karapetian | 2 | 0 | 0 | 0 | 2 | 0 |
| 91 | (Russia) | FW | Aleksandr Kokorin | 2 | 0 | 0 | 0 | 2 | 0 |
| 94 | (Montenegro) | MF | Dušan Lagator | 5 | 0 | 0 | 0 | 5 | 0 |
Players away on loan:
Players who left Sochi during the season:
| 13 | (Russia) | DF | Fyodor Kudryashov | 6 | 1 | 0 | 0 | 6 | 1 |
| Total | | | | 72 | 2 | 2 | 0 | 74 | 2 |
