= 2018–19 Artsakh FC season =

Artsakh
2018–19 season
- Director: Karen Abrahamayan
- Manager: Rafael Nazaryan (until 7 January); Sevada Arzumanyan (from 7 January)
- Stadium: Vazgen Sargsyan Republican Stadium
- Premier League: 8th
- Armenian Cup: Quarter-final (v. Alashkert)
- Top goalscorer: League: Eduard Avagyan (4); All: Three Players (4)
Home colours	Away colours

The 2018–19 season was Artsakh FC's 1st season in the Armenian Premier League.

== Squad ==
As of match played 30 May 2019

Number	Name	Nationality	Position	Date of birth (age)	Signed from	Signed in	Contract ends	Apps.	Goals
Goalkeepers
1	Samur Agamagomedov	(Russia)	GK	30 November 1998 (aged 20)	Nika Moscow	2018		19	0
12	Arman Meliksetyan	(Armenia)	GK	21 July 1995 (aged 23)	Ararat Yerevan	2018		22	0
55	Aleksei Solosin	(Russia)	GK	11 August 1987 (aged 31)	Unattached	2019		3	0
95	Erik Meliksetyan	(Armenia)	GK	26 August 2000 (aged 18)	Banants	2018		6	0
99	Ashot Ayvazyan	(Armenia)	GK	19 August 1998 (aged 20)	Erebuni	2019		0	0
Defenders
2	Hakob Hambardzumyan	(Armenia)	DF	26 May 1997 (aged 22)	on loan from Banants	2017		27	1
3	Alan Tatayev	(Russia)	DF	3 August 1995 (aged 23)	Unattached	2019		9	0
4	Vardan Movsisyan	(Armenia)	DF	18 August 1991 (aged 27)	Lori	2019		11	0
6	Argishti Petrosyan	(Armenia)	DF	16 October 1992 (aged 26)	Ararat Yerevan	2018		32	1
18	Dmytro Klimakov	(Ukraine)	DF	5 March 1989 (aged 30)	Metalist Kharkiv	2019		9	1
19	Vahagn Minasyan	(Armenia)	DF	25 April 1985 (aged 34)	Unattached	2018		16	0
33	Hovhannes Nazaryan	(Armenia)	DF	11 March 1998 (aged 21)	Pyunik	2018		32	0
Midfielders
5	Geo Danny Ekra	(Ivory Coast)	MF	10 January 1999 (aged 20)	Saksan	2019		4	0
7	Karen Harutyunyan	(Armenia)	MF	6 July 1995 (aged 23)	Banants	2017		51	3
8	Yuri Gareginyan	(Armenia)	MF	3 February 1994 (aged 25)	Ararat Yerevan	2018		22	3
9	Benik Hovhannisyan	(Armenia)	MF	1 May 1993 (aged 26)	Alashkert	2019		13	0
10	Artur Grigoryan (captain)	(Armenia)	MF	10 July 1993 (aged 25)	Alashkert	2017		58	2
11	Eduard Avagyan	(Armenia)	MF	21 March 1996 (aged 23)	Banants	2017		42	8
14	Emil Yeghiazaryan	(Armenia)	MF	3 November 1997 (aged 21)	Banants	2018		39	7
23	Artur Stepanyan	(Armenia)	MF	17 November 1999 (aged 19)	Ararat Yerevan	2018		4	0
Forwards
17	Edgar Movsesyan	(Armenia)	FW	9 September 1998 (aged 20)	Banants	2019		8	1
20	Vigen Avetisyan	(Armenia)	FW	12 January 1993 (aged 26)	Lori	2019		9	2
28	Wilfried Eza	(Ivory Coast)	FW	28 December 1996 (aged 22)	Gomel	2019		11	0
77	Abdoul Gafar	(Burkina Faso)	FW	30 December 1998 (aged 20)	Unattached	2019		3	0
88	Vardan Bakalyan	(Armenia)	FW	4 April 1995 (aged 24)	Ararat-Armenia	2019		16	2
Players who left during the season
2	Marat Burayev	(Russia)	DF	22 October 1995 (aged 23)	Pyunik	2018		8	1
3	Hamlet Asoyan	(Armenia)	DF	13 January 1995 (aged 24)	Homenetmen Beirut	2018		19	4
4	Eric Nazaryan	(Armenia)	DF	14 March 1996 (aged 23)	Ararat Yerevan	2018		14	1
5	Gevorg Poghosyan	(Armenia)	DF	26 August 1986 (aged 32)	Homenetmen Beirut	2018		10	0
8	Narek Gyozalyan	(Armenia)	MF	10 July 1992 (aged 26)	Kotayk	2017		17	2
9	Grigor Aghekyan	(Armenia)	FW	8 April 1996 (aged 23)	Banants	2017		46	23
17	Oleksandr Tupchiyenko	(Ukraine)	DF	10 December 1995 (aged 23)	Unattached	2018		15	0
18	Walter Poghosyan	(Armenia)	MF	16 May 1992 (aged 27)	Gandzasar Kapan	2018		13	3
21	Sarkis Baloyan	(Armenia)	FW	24 August 1992 (aged 26)	Kuban-Holding Pavlovskaya	2018		13	1
21	Hovhannes Poghosyan	(Armenia)	MF	15 March 1990 (aged 29)	on loan from Pyunik	2018		14	1
22	Norayr Gyozalyan	(Armenia)	FW	15 March 1990 (aged 29)	Banants	2018		13	0
28	Irakli Bidzinashvili	(Georgia (country))	MF	27 February 1997 (aged 22)	Saburtalo Tbilisi	2018		7	0
88	Maksim Yermakov	(Russia)	MF	21 April 1995 (aged 24)	Unattached	2018		1	0
98	Akmal Bakhtiyarov	(Kazakhstan)	MF	2 June 1998 (aged 20)	Kairat	2018		11	4

== Transfers ==
=== In ===
Date	Position	Nationality	Name	From	Fee	Ref.
Winter 2019	GK	(Armenia)	Ashot Ayvazyan	Erebuni	Undisclosed	
Winter 2019	GK	(Russia)	Aleksei Solosin		Free	
Winter 2019	DF	(Armenia)	Vardan Movsisyan	Lori	Undisclosed	
Winter 2019	DF	(Russia)	Alan Tatayev	Ararat Yerevan	Undisclosed	
Winter 2019	MF	(Armenia)	Benik Hovhannisyan	Alashkert	Undisclosed	
Winter 2019	MF	(Armenia)	Edgar Movsisyan	Banants	Undisclosed	
Winter 2019	MF	(Armenia)	Mher Sahakyan	Alashkert	Undisclosed	
Winter 2019	MF	(Ivory Coast)	Geo Danny Ekra	Saxan	Undisclosed	
Winter 2019	MF	(Ukraine)	Dmytro Klimakov	Metalist 1925 Kharkiv	Undisclosed	
Winter 2019	FW	(Armenia)	Vigen Avetisyan	Lori	Undisclosed	
Winter 2019	FW	(Armenia)	Vardan Bakalyan	Ararat-Armenia	Free	
Winter 2019	FW	(Ivory Coast)	Wilfried Eza	Gomel	Undisclosed	
May 2019	FW	(Burkina Faso)	Abdoul Gafar	Sheriff Tiraspol	Free	

=== Loans in ===
Date from	Position	Nationality	Name	From	Date to	Ref.
Summer 2018	MF	(Armenia)	Hovhannes Poghosyan	Pyunik	Winter 2019	

=== Out ===
Date	Position	Nationality	Name	To	Fee	Ref.
Winter 2019	DF	(Armenia)	Hamlet Asoyan	Gandzasar Kapan	Undisclosed	
Winter 2019	DF	(Russia)	Marat Burayev	Krymteplytsia Molodizhne	Undisclosed	
Winter 2019	MF	(Georgia (country))	Irakli Bidzinashvili	Jelgava	Undisclosed	
Winter 2019	MF	(Kazakhstan)	Akmal Bakhtiyarov	Sochi	Undisclosed	
Winter 2019	FW	(Russia)	Grigor Aghekyan	Isloch	Undisclosed	
Winter 2019	FW	(Russia)	Sarkis Baloyan	Kuban Krasnodar	Undisclosed	

=== Released ===
Date	Position	Nationality	Name	Joined	Date
Winter 2019	DF	(Armenia)	Erik Nazaryan		
Winter 2019	DF	(Armenia)	Gevorg Poghosyan		
Winter 2019	DF	(Ukraine)	Oleksandr Tupchiyenko		
Winter 2019	MF	(Armenia)	Walter Poghosyan		
Winter 2019	MF	(Russia)	Maksim Yermakov		
28 March 2019	MF	(Armenia)	Narek Gyozalyan		
28 March 2019	MF	(Armenia)	Norayr Gyozalyan		

== Competitions ==
=== Overview ===
Competition	First match	Last match	Starting round	Final position	Record							
Competition	First match	Last match	Starting round	Final position	Pld	W	D	L	GF	GA	GD	Win %
Premier League	11 August 2018	30 May 2019	Matchday 1	8th	32	6	10	16	25	49	−24	18.75
Armenian Cup	20 September 2018	7 November 2018	First Round	Quarter-final	4	1	1	2	4	4	+0	25.00
Total					36	7	11	18	29	53	−24	19.44

Last updated: 7 July 2026
Source: Competitions

=== Premier League ===
==== Table ====
Pos	Team	Pld	W	D	L	GF	GA	GD	Pts	Qualification or relegation
1	Ararat-Armenia (C)	32	18	7	7	53	28	+25	61	Qualification for the Champions League first qualifying round
2	Pyunik	32	18	6	8	46	32	+14	60	Qualification for the Europa League first qualifying round (Note: Alashkert qualified for the Europa League first qualifying round by winning the 2018–19 Armenian Cup.)
3	Banants	32	14	10	8	43	35	+8	52	Qualification for the Europa League first qualifying round
4	Alashkert	32	15	6	11	37	27	+10	51	Qualification for the Europa League first qualifying round
5	Lori	32	11	11	10	42	40	+2	44	
6	Gandzasar	32	10	8	14	38	33	+5	38	
7	Shirak	32	7	15	10	26	30	−4	36	
8	Artsakh	32	6	10	16	25	49	−24	28	
9	Ararat Yerevan	32	5	7	20	24	60	−36	22	

Source: Soccerway
Rules for classification: 1) Points; 2) Play-off (only if deciding champion); 3) Matches won; 4) Head-to-head points; 5) Head-to-head matches won; 6) Head-to-head goal difference; 7) Head-to-head goals scored; 8) Head-to-head away goals scored; 9) Goal difference; 10) Goals scored.
(C) Champions

==== Results summary ====
Overall								Home						Away					
Pld	W	D	L	GF	GA	GD	Pts	W	D	L	GF	GA	GD	W	D	L	GF	GA	GD
32	6	10	16	25	49	−24	28	4	8	4	17	19	−2	2	2	12	8	30	−22

Last updated: 30 May 2019.
Source: See Results

==== Results ====
11 August 2018 2	Artsakh	1–0	Banants	Yerevan
17:00 (UTC+4)	Yermakov (yellow card) 30'; Aghekyan 54'	Report	Ayvazyan (yellow card) 33'; Babayan 52'	Stadium: Mika Stadium; Referee: Suren Baliyan

18 August 2018 3	Lori	3–2	Artsakh	Vanadzor
16:30 (UTC+4)	Désiré 29', 43'; Avetisyan 49'; Mkrtchyan (yellow card) 80'	Report	Petrosyan (yellow card) 52'; Aghekyan 70'; Movsisyan 74' (o.g.)	Stadium: Vanadzor Football Academy; Referee: Artur Safaryan

22 August 2018 4	Artsakh	1–1	Ararat Yerevan	Yerevan
14:00 (UTC+4)	Yeghiazaryan (yellow card) 43'; Asoyan (yellow card) 67'; Avagyan 82'	Report	Tatayev (yellow card) 50'; Safaryan (yellow card) 60'; Arzoyan (yellow card) 62'; Badoyan 63'; Avagyan (yellow card) 72'	Stadium: Mika Stadium; Referee: Artur Simonyan

26 August 2018 5	Pyunik	2–0	Artsakh	Yerevan
19:00 (UTC+4)	Hovsepyan 35' (pen.); Vardanyan 58' (yellow card) 59'; Manucharyan (yellow card) 61'; Kolychev (yellow card) 81'	Report	Asoyan (yellow card) 35'; Harutyunyan (yellow card) 40'; W.Poghosyan (yellow card) 62'	Stadium: Republican Stadium; Referee: Henrik Nalbandyan

29 August 2018 6	Artsakh	2–2	Gandzasar Kapan	Yerevan
14:00 (UTC+4)	Asoyan 31'; Burayev 33'; Na.Gyozalyan (yellow card) 90+2'	Report	Manasyan 31'; Asoyan 82' (o.g.); Ohanyan (yellow card) 85'	Stadium: MF Stadium; Referee: Gevorg Eghoyan

1 September 2018 7	Alashkert	6–0	Artsakh	Yerevan
16:00 (UTC+4)	Asoyan 2' (o.g.); G.Poghosyan 15'; Arta.Yedigaryan 49' (pen.), 79', 81'; Nenadović 65'	Report	E.Nazaryan (yellow card) 40'	Stadium: Alashkert Stadium; Referee: Artur Safaryan

15 September 2018 8	Artsakh	1–1	Ararat-Armenia	Yerevan
14:00 (UTC+4)	H.Poghosyan 68'; Tupchiyenko (yellow card) 74'	Report	Dimitrov 44'; Guz (yellow card) 62'; Kayron (yellow card) 77'	Stadium: Mika Stadium; Referee: Henrik Nalbandyan

23 September 2018 9	Shirak	3–0	Artsakh	Gyumri
16:00 (UTC+4)	K.Muradyan (yellow card) 11'; Cruz 18'; Ndong 20'; Kabangu 30' (yellow card) 55'	Report		Stadium: City Stadium; Referee: Gevorg Eghoyan

7 October 2018 11	Banants	2–1	Artsakh	Yerevan
14:00 (UTC+4)	Stanojević (yellow card) 44' (goal) 49'; Kpodo (yellow card) 90'; Udo 90+2'	Report	Tupchiyenko (yellow card) 34'; Yeghiazaryan 38'; H.Poghosyan (yellow card) 35'; Petrosyan (yellow card) 64'; Minasyan (yellow card) 75'	Stadium: Banants Stadium; Referee: Henrik Nalbandyan

20 October 2018 12	Artsakh	2–3	Lori	Yerevan
14:00 (UTC+4)	Avagyan 8' (yellow card) 65'; H.Poghosyan (yellow card) 11'; Grigoryan (yellow card) 37'; Bakhtiyarov 90+3'	Report	Désiré 23', 88'; Aliyu 76'; Dosa (yellow card) 90+1'	Stadium: Mika Stadium; Referee: Zaven Hovhannisyan

27 October 2018 13	Ararat Yerevan	0–0	Artsakh	Yerevan
15:00 (UTC+4)	Safaryan (yellow card) 27'	Report	Petrosyan (yellow card) 18'; E.Nazaryan (yellow card) 64'; Asoyan (yellow card) 78'; Avagyan (yellow card) 86'	Stadium: Alashkert Stadium; Referee: Artur Safaryan

31 October 2018 14	Artsakh	0–0	Pyunik	Yerevan
14:00 (UTC+4)	H.Nazaryan (yellow card) 37'; K.Harutyunyan (yellow card) 88'	Report		Stadium: Mika Stadium; Referee: Zaven Hovhannisyan

3 November 2018 15	Gandzasar Kapan	0–2	Artsakh	Yerevan
18:00 (UTC+4)	V.Minasyan (yellow card) 47'; Terteryan (yellow card) 64'	Report	Bakhtiyarov 6' (yellow card) 80'; Harutyunyan (yellow card) 82'; Aghekyan 88'	Stadium: Academy Stadium; Referee: Suren Baliyan

11 November 2018 16	Artsakh	0–0	Alashkert	Yerevan
14:00 (UTC+4)	Yeghiazaryan (yellow card) 75'; G.Poghosyan (yellow card) 90'	Report	Voskanyan (yellow card) 9' (yellow-red card) 88'	Stadium: Mika Stadium; Referee: Zaven Hovhannisyan

24 November 2018 17	Ararat-Armenia	3–1	Artsakh	Yerevan
15:00 (UTC+4)	Dimitrov 1', 17', 40'; Monsalvo (yellow card) 53'; Martínez (yellow card) 57'	Report	Bakhtiyarov 23'; Minasyan (yellow card) 55'; H.Poghosyan (yellow card) 58'	Stadium: Republican Stadium; Referee: Artur Safaryan

28 November 2018 18	Artsakh	0–1	Shirak	Yerevan
14:00 (UTC+4)	Minasyan (yellow card) 25' (yellow-red card) 57'; Hambardzumyan (yellow card) 36'; Baloyan (yellow card) 40'	Report	Shakhnazaryan (yellow card) 20'; A.Muradyan (yellow card) 25'; Bougouhi 75' (pen.)	Stadium: Mika Stadium; Referee: Artur Simonyan

3 March 2018 20	Artsakh	1–1	Banants	Yerevan
14:00 (UTC+4)	Klimakov (yellow card) 9' (goal) 19'; Harutyunyan (yellow card) 16'; Hambardzumyan (yellow card) 57'; Gareginyan (yellow card) 82'	Report	Avagyan (yellow card) 10'; Glišić 35' (yellow card) 66'; Gadzhibekov (yellow card) 46'; Darbinyan (yellow card) 52'; Udo (yellow card) 56'	Stadium: Pyunik Training Centre; Referee: Geovorg Eghoyan

6 March 2019 21	Lori	2–0	Artsakh	Vanadzor
15:00 (UTC+4)	Désiré 11', 59' (pen.)	Report	Bakalyan (yellow card) 59'; Yeghiazaryan (yellow card) 72'	Stadium: Vanadzor Football Academy; Referee: Artur Safaryan

10 March 2019 22	Artsakh	0–0	Ararat Yerevan	Yerevan
14:00 (UTC+4)	No.Gyozalyan (yellow card) 31'	Report	Gassama (yellow card) 17'; Vukomanović (yellow card) 33'	Stadium: Pyunik Training Centre; Referee: Artur Simonyan

16 March 2019 23	Pyunik	1–0	Artsakh	Yerevan
14:00 (UTC+4)	Mkrtchyan (yellow card) 19'; Konaté 29'; Shevchuk (yellow card) 32'; Marku (yellow card) 45+2'	Report	Klimakov (yellow card) 34'; Petrosyan (yellow card) 54'	Stadium: Pyunik Training Centre; Referee: Ashot Ghaltakchyan

1 April 2019 24	Artsakh	2–0	Gandzasar Kapan	Yerevan
14:00 (UTC+4)	Gareginyan (yellow card) 25'; Avagyan 39'; Harutyunyan (yellow card) 71'; Bakalyan 79'	Report	Chula (yellow card) 66'; Adamyan (yellow card) 78'	Stadium: Pyunik Training Centre; Referee: Henrik Albandyan

7 April 2019 25	Alashkert	1–0	Artsakh	Yerevan
15:00 (UTC+4)	Zeljković (yellow card) 13'; Grigoryan (yellow card) 38'; Nenadović (yellow card) 53'; Marmentini 66'	Report	Gareginyan (yellow card) 21'; Yeghiazaryan (yellow card) 54'; Hovhannisyan (yellow card) 61'	Stadium: Alashkert Stadium; Referee: Artur Simonyan

11 April 2019 26	Artsakh	1–3	Ararat-Armenia	Yerevan
15:00 (UTC+4)	Meliksetyan (yellow card) 30'; Avetisyan 39'	Report	Avetisyan 9', 19'; Čupić (yellow card) 28'; Kobyalko 66'	Stadium: Pyunik Training Centre; Referee: Artur Safaryan

15 April 2019 27	Shirak	0–0	Artsakh	Gyumri
16:00 (UTC+4)	Gevorgyan (yellow card) 46'; Muradyan (yellow card) 56'; Davoyan (yellow card) 80'	Report	H.Nazaryan (yellow card) 43'; Gareginyan (yellow card) 80'	Stadium: City Stadium; Referee: Henrik Nalbandyan

27 April 2019 29	Banants	3–0	Artsakh	Yerevan
19:30 (UTC+4)	Kpodo 24'; Glišić 57'; Kobzar 66'	Report	Petrosyan (yellow card) 45'	Stadium: Banants Stadium; Referee: Artur Safaryan

1 May 2019 30	Artsakh	2–1	Lori	Yerevan
16:00 (UTC+4)	Avagyan (yellow card) 56'; Movsisyan (yellow card) 82'; Gareginyan 89'; Movsesyan 90+3'	Report	Désiré 70' (pen.)	Stadium: Pyunik Training Centre; Referee: Henrik Nalbandyan

6 May 2019 31	Ararat Yerevan	2–1	Artsakh	Yerevan
16:00 (UTC+4)	Simonyan 11' (pen.); Badoyan 67'; Kaluhin (red card) 85'; Hakobyan (yellow card) 90+1'; Ayvazyan (yellow card) 90+5'	Report	Meliksetyan (yellow card) 10'; Gareginyan (yellow card) 31'; Hovhannisyan (yellow card) 37'; Bakalyan 45'; Yeghiazaryan (red card) 85'	Stadium: Banants-3 Stadium; Referee: Artur Safaryan

10 May 2019 32	Artsakh	0–3	Pyunik	Yerevan
16:00 (UTC+4)		Report	Marku 10'; Zhestokov 23'; Konaté 39'	Stadium: Alashkert Stadium; Referee: Suren Baliyan

14 May 2019 33	Gandzasar Kapan	0–1	Artsakh	Yerevan
16:00 (UTC+4)	Chula (yellow card) 44'; M.Manasyan (yellow card) 45'; A.Hovhannisyan (yellow card) 64'; Baldé (yellow card) 85'	Report	Tatayev (yellow card) 14'; Petrosyan 17'; Movsisyan (red card) 62'; Meliksetyan (yellow card) 90+1'	Stadium: Academy Stadium; Referee: Henrik Nalbandyan

19 May 2019 34	Artsakh	1–1	Alashkert	Yerevan
16:00 (UTC+4)	Harutyunyan (yellow card) 33'; Avagyan 49'; Petrosyan (yellow card) 82'	Report	Antonić (yellow card) 80'; Tumasyan 90'	Stadium: Mika Stadium; Referee: Artur Safaryan

24 May 2019 35	Ararat-Armenia	2–0	Artsakh	Yerevan
17:00 (UTC+4)	Kobyalko 7', 48' (pen.); Malakyan (yellow card) 80'; Khozin (yellow card) 88'	Report	Avagyan (yellow card) 17'; Hovhannisyan (yellow card) 18'; Movsisyan (yellow card) 36'	Stadium: Academy Stadium; Referee: Xavier Estrada Fernández

30 May 2019 36	Artsakh	3–2	Shirak	Yerevan
17:00 (UTC+4)	Gareginyan 7' (pen.), 66' (yellow card) 38'; H.Nazaryan (yellow card) 20'; Movsisyan (yellow card) 37' (yellow-red card) 41'; Avetisyan 75'; Petrosyan (yellow card) 78'; Meliksetyan (yellow card) 90+2'	Report	K.Muradyan 72'; Jusufi 90'; Davoyan (yellow card) 90+5'	Stadium: Mika Stadium; Referee: Ashot Ghaltakchyan

=== Armenian Cup ===
20 September 2018 First Round 1st leg	Artsakh	0–0	Shirak	Yerevan
16:00 (UTC+4)	Gareginyan (yellow card) 30'; Tupchiyenko (yellow card) 58'; Petrosyan (yellow card) 87'	Report		Stadium: Mika Stadium; Referee: Artur Safaryan

4 October 2018 First Round 2nd leg	Shirak	1–3 (1–3 agg.)	Artsakh	Yerevan
14:00 (UTC+4)	Ndong 13'	Report	Tupchiyenko (yellow card) 58'; Yeghiazaryan 48'; Aghekyan 68'; H.Nazaryan (yellow card) 71'; Baloyan 77'	Stadium: Mika Stadium; Referee: Artur Safaryan

24 October 2018 Quarterfinal 1st leg	Artsakh	1–2	Alashkert	Yerevan
15:00 (UTC+4)	Bakhtiyarov 36' (pen.); Aghekyan (yellow card) 79'; Minasyan (yellow card) 80'; Tupchiyenko (yellow card) 87'	Report	Jefferson 27' (yellow card) 47'; Voskanyan (yellow card) 35'; Arta.Yedigaryan 81' (pen.)	Stadium: Mika Stadium; Referee: Ashot Ghaltakchyan

7 November 2018 Quarterfinal 2nd leg	Alashkert	1–0 (3–1 agg.)	Artsakh	Yerevan
14:00 (UTC+4)	Marmentini (yellow card) 25'; Romero (yellow card) 31'; G.Poghosyan (yellow card) 33'; Shahinyan 90+3'	Report	Petrosyan (yellow card) 31'; H.Poghosyan (yellow card) 35'; Meliksetyan (yellow card) 90+3'	Stadium: Alashkert Stadium; Referee: Henrik Nalbandyan

== Statistics ==
As of match played 30 May 2019

=== Appearances and goals ===
No.	Pos	Nat	Player	Total		Premier League		Armenian Cup	
No.	Pos	Nat	Player	Apps	Goals	Apps	Goals	Apps	Goals
1	GK	(Russia) RUS	Samur Agamagomedov	8	0	8	0	0	0
2	DF	(Armenia) ARM	Hakob Hambardzumyan	18	0	13+3	0	1+1	0
3	DF	(Russia) RUS	Alan Tatayev	9	0	8+1	0	0	0
4	DF	(Armenia) ARM	Vardan Movsisyan	11	0	11	0	0	0
5	MF	(Ivory Coast) CIV	Geo Danny Ekra	4	0	3+1	0	0	0
6	DF	(Armenia) ARM	Argishti Petrosyan	32	1	28	1	4	0
7	MF	(Armenia) ARM	Karen Harutyunyan	25	0	13+8	0	3+1	0
8	MF	(Armenia) ARM	Yuri Gareginyan	22	3	17+4	3	1	0
9	MF	(Armenia) ARM	Benik Hovhannisyan	13	0	11+2	0	0	0
10	MF	(Armenia) ARM	Artur Grigoryan	34	0	31	0	3	0
11	MF	(Armenia) ARM	Eduard Avagyan	26	4	18+7	4	1	0
12	GK	(Armenia) ARM	Arman Meliksetyan	22	0	18	0	4	0
14	MF	(Armenia) ARM	Emil Yeghiazaryan	28	2	17+7	1	3+1	1
17	FW	(Armenia) ARM	Edgar Movsesyan	8	1	4+4	1	0	0
18	DF	(Ukraine) UKR	Dmytro Klimakov	9	1	6+3	1	0	0
19	DF	(Armenia) ARM	Vahagn Minasyan	16	0	12+1	0	2+1	0
20	FW	(Armenia) ARM	Vigen Avetisyan	9	2	6+3	2	0	0
23	MF	(Armenia) ARM	Artur Stepanyan	4	0	2+2	0	0	0
28	FW	(Ivory Coast) CIV	Wilfried Eza	11	0	5+6	0	0	0
33	DF	(Armenia) ARM	Hovhannes Nazaryan	32	0	28	0	4	0
55	GK	(Russia) RUS	Aleksei Solosin	3	0	3	0	0	0
77	FW	(Burkina Faso) BFA	Abdoul Gafar	3	0	0+3	0	0	0
88	FW	(Armenia) ARM	Vardan Bakalyan	16	2	7+9	2	0	0
95	GK	(Armenia) ARM	Erik Meliksetyan	3	0	3	0	0	0
Players away on loan:
Players who left Artsakh during the season:
2	DF	(Russia) RUS	Marat Burayev	8	1	4+3	1	0+1	0
3	DF	(Armenia) ARM	Hamlet Asoyan	7	1	7	1	0	0
4	DF	(Armenia) ARM	Erik Nazaryan	3	0	3	0	0	0
5	DF	(Armenia) ARM	Gevorg Poghosyan	10	0	7+1	0	2	0
8	MF	(Armenia) ARM	Narek Gyozalyan	8	0	4+3	0	1	0
9	FW	(Armenia) ARM	Grigor Aghekyan	20	4	9+7	3	4	1
17	DF	(Ukraine) UKR	Oleksandr Tupchiyenko	15	0	11	0	4	0
18	MF	(Armenia) ARM	Walter Poghosyan	5	0	5	0	0	0
21	FW	(Armenia) ARM	Sarkis Baloyan	13	1	5+5	0	1+2	1
22	MF	(Armenia) ARM	Hovhannes Poghosyan	14	1	9+1	1	3+1	0
22	FW	(Armenia) ARM	Norayr Gyozalyan	13	0	7+4	0	0+2	0
28	MF	(Georgia (country)) GEO	Irakli Bidzinashvili	7	0	2+3	0	1+1	0
88	MF	(Russia) RUS	Maksim Yermakov	1	0	1	0	0	0
98	MF	(Kazakhstan) KAZ	Akmal Bakhtiyarov	11	4	5+3	3	2+1	1

=== Goal scorers ===
Place	Position	Nation	Number	Name	Premier League	Armenian Cup	Total
1	MF	(Armenia)	11	Eduard Avagyan	4	0	4
1	FW	(Armenia)	9	Grigor Aghekyan	3	1	4
1	MF	(Kazakhstan)	98	Akmal Bakhtiyarov	3	1	4
4	MF	(Armenia)	8	Yuri Gareginyan	3	0	3
5	FW	(Armenia)	88	Vardan Bakalyan	2	0	2
5	FW	(Armenia)	20	Vigen Avetisyan	2	0	2
5	MF	(Armenia)	14	Emil Yeghiazaryan	1	1	2
8	DF	(Armenia)	3	Hamlet Asoyan	1	0	1
8	DF	(Russia)	2	Marat Burayev	1	0	1
8	MF	(Armenia)	22	Hovhannes Poghosyan	1	0	1
8	DF	(Ukraine)	18	Dmytro Klimakov	1	0	1
8	FW	(Armenia)	17	Edgar Movsesyan	1	0	1
8	DF	(Armenia)	6	Argishti Petrosyan	1	0	1
8	FW	(Armenia)	21	Sarkis Baloyan	0	1	1
8				Own goal	1	0	1
				TOTALS	25	4	29

=== Clean sheets ===
Place	Position	Nation	Number	Name	Premier League	Armenian Cup	Total
1	GK	(Armenia)	12	Arman Meliksetyan	7	1	8
2	GK	(Russia)	1	Samur Agamagomedov	1	0	1
2	GK	(Russia)	55	Aleksei Solosin	1	0	1
				TOTALS	9	1	10

=== Disciplinary record ===
Number	Nation	Position	Name	Premier League		Armenian Cup		Total	
Number	Nation	Position	Name	Booked	Sent off (straight red)	Booked	Sent off (straight red)	Booked	Sent off (straight red)
2	(Armenia)	DF	Hakob Hambardzumyan	2	0	0	0	2	0
3	(Russia)	DF	Alan Tatayev	1	0	0	0	1	0
4	(Armenia)	DF	Vardan Movsisyan	4	2	0	0	4	2
6	(Armenia)	MF	Argishti Petrosyan	7	0	2	0	9	0
7	(Armenia)	MF	Karen Harutyunyan	6	0	0	0	6	0
8	(Armenia)	MF	Yuri Gareginyan	6	0	1	0	7	0
9	(Armenia)	MF	Benik Hovhannisyan	3	0	0	0	3	0
10	(Armenia)	MF	Artur Grigoryan	1	0	0	0	1	0
11	(Armenia)	MF	Eduard Avagyan	4	0	0	0	4	0
12	(Armenia)	GK	Arman Meliksetyan	4	0	1	0	5	0
14	(Armenia)	MF	Emil Yeghiazaryan	4	1	0	0	4	1
18	(Ukraine)	DF	Dmytro Klimakov	2	0	0	0	2	0
19	(Armenia)	DF	Vahagn Minasyan	4	1	1	0	5	1
21	(Armenia)	FW	Sarkis Baloyan	1	0	0	0	1	0
24	(Ukraine)	DF	Oleksandr Tupchiyenko	2	0	3	0	5	0
33	(Armenia)	DF	Hovhannes Nazaryan	3	0	1	0	4	0
88	(Armenia)	FW	Vardan Bakalyan	1	0	0	0	1	0
Players who left Ararat-Armenia during the season:
3	(Armenia)	DF	Hamlet Asoyan	3	0	0	0	3	0
4	(Armenia)	DF	Erik Nazaryan	2	0	0	0	2	0
5	(Armenia)	DF	Gevorg Poghosyan	1	0	0	0	1	0
8	(Armenia)	MF	Narek Gyozalyan	1	0	0	0	1	0
9	(Armenia)	FW	Grigor Aghekyan	0	0	1	0	1	0
22	(Armenia)	MF	Hovhannes Poghosyan	4	0	1	0	5	0
22	(Armenia)	FW	Norayr Gyozalyan	1	0	0	0	1	0
88	(Russia)	MF	Maksim Yermakov	1	0	0	0	1	0
99	(Kazakhstan)	MF	Akmal Bakhtiyarov	1	0	0	0	1	0
			TOTALS	69	4	11	0	80	4
