= Pavel Shakuro =

Russian footballer

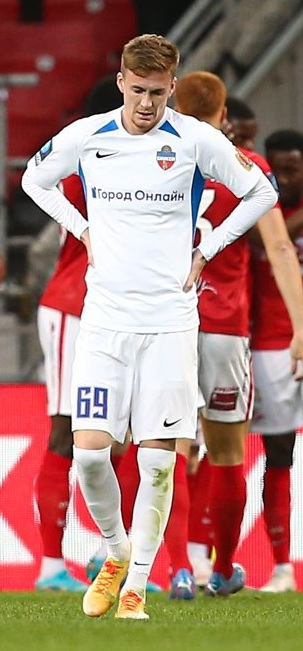
- Shakuro with Yenisey in 2022

Personal information
- Full name: Pavel Yevgenyevich Shakuro
- Date of birth: 25 July 1997 (age 29)
- Place of birth: Tyumen, Russia
- Height: 1.80 m (5 ft 11 in)
- Position: Left-back

Team information
- Current team: FC Tyumen
- Number: 90

Senior career*
Years	Team	Apps	(Gls)
2015–2019	FC Tyumen	88	(2)
2019–2022	PFC Sochi	2	(0)
2020–2021	→ FC Irtysh Omsk (loan)	35	(0)
2022	FC Yenisey Krasnoyarsk	8	(0)
2022–2023	FC Akron Tolyatti	27	(0)
2023–2024	FC Volgar Astrakhan	20	(0)
2024–2025	FC Shinnik Yaroslavl	23	(0)
2025–	FC Tyumen	42	(3)

International career^{‡}
2017	Russia U-21	7	(0)
- * Club domestic league appearances and goals as of 17 October 2026 ‡ National team caps and goals as of 10 November 2017

Pavel Yevgenyevich Shakuro (Russian: Павел Евгеньевич Шакуро; born 25 July 1997) is a Russian football player who plays for FC Tyumen.

== Club career ==
He made his debut in the Russian Football National League for FC Tyumen on 30 August 2015 in a game against FC Zenit-2 St. Petersburg.

On 21 June 2019 he signed with Russian Premier League club PFC Sochi. He made his Russian Premier League debut for Sochi on 10 November 2019 in a game against PFC CSKA Moscow, substituting Elmir Nabiullin in the 60th minute. On 30 July 2020, he joined FC Irtysh Omsk on loan for the 2020–21 season.

== Career statistics ==
As of 13 December 2021

Club	Season	League			Cup		Continental		Other		Total	
Club	Season	Division	Apps	Goals	Apps	Goals	Apps	Goals	Apps	Goals	Apps	Goals
Tyumen	2015–16	FNL	19	1	0	0	–		4 (Note: Appearances in the FNL Cup)	1	23	2
Tyumen	2016–17	FNL	32	0	1	0	–		2	0	35	0
Tyumen	2017–18	FNL	16	0	2	0	–		4	0	22	0
Tyumen	2018–19	FNL	21	1	1	0	–		5	0	27	1
Tyumen	Total		88	2	4	0	0	0	15	1	107	3
Sochi	2019–20	RPL	2	0	1	0	–		–		3	0
Irtysh Omsk	2020–21	FNL	35	0	1	0	–		–		36	0
Sochi	2021–22	RPL	0	0	0	0	0	0	–		0	0
Sochi	Total		2	0	1	0	0	0	0	0	3	0
Career total			125	2	6	0	0	0	15	1	146	3
