= Akmal Bakhtiyarov =

Kazakhstani football player

Personal information
- Full name: Akmal Anuaruly Bakhtiyarov
- Date of birth: 2 June 1998 (age 28)
- Place of birth: Talgar, Kazakhstan
- Height: 1.71 m (5 ft 7 in)
- Position: Midfielder

Team information
- Current team: Elimai
- Number: 17

Youth career
- DYuSSh Talgar
- 2012–2016: FC Kairat

Senior career*
Years	Team	Apps	(Gls)
2017–2018	Kairat	0	(0)
2017–2018	→ Kairat-A	15	(5)
2017	→ FC Kairat-M	26	(10)
2018	Artsakh	8	(3)
2019–2021	Sochi	9	(0)
2021	Zhetysu	5	(0)
2021–2022	Olimp-Dolgoprudny	24	(1)
2022–2024	Ordabasy	13	(1)
2024	Chelyabinsk	16	(3)
2024–2025	Volgar Astrakhan	34	(4)
2025–	Elimai	38	(3)

International career^{‡}
2016	Kazakhstan U18	5	(1)
2016	Kazakhstan U19	3	(0)
2018–2020	Kazakhstan U21	9	(1)
- * Club domestic league appearances and goals as of 1 November 2026 ‡ National team caps and goals as of 27 March 2018

Akmal Anuaruly Bakhtiyarov (Kazakh: Ақмал Әнуарұлы Бақтияров; born 2 June 1998) is a Kazakhstani football player who plays for Elimai.

== Career ==
=== Club ===
Bakhtiyarov made his debut in the Russian Football National League for PFC Sochi on 10 March 2019 in a game against FC Armavir. He made his Russian Premier League debut for Sochi on 26 October 2019, substituting Nikita Burmistrov in the 86th minute of a 0–2 loss to FC Rostov.

In March 2021 he returned to Kazakhstan and signed with Zhetysu. In July 2022 he returned to Kazakhstan and signed with Ordabasy.

== Career statistics ==
=== Club ===
As of match played 10 July 2021

Appearances and goals by club, season and competition
Club	Season	League			National Cup		Continental		Other		Total	
Club	Season	Division	Apps	Goals	Apps	Goals	Apps	Goals	Apps	Goals	Apps	Goals
Kairat	2017	Kazakhstan Premier League	0	0	0	0	0	0	0	0	0	0
Kairat	2018	Kazakhstan Premier League	0	0	4	1	0	0	0	0	4	1
Kairat	Total		0	0	4	1	0	0	0	0	4	1
Artsakh	2018–19	Armenian Premier League	8	3	3	1	–		–		11	4
Sochi	2018–19	Russian FNL	6	0	0	0	-		-		6	0
Sochi	2019–20	Russian Premier League	2	0	1	0	-		-		3	0
Sochi	2020–21	Russian Premier League	1	0	1	0	-		-		2	0
Sochi	Total		9	0	2	0	-	-	-	-	11	0
Zhetysu	2021	Kazakhstan Premier League	5	0	0	0	–		–		5	0
Olimp-Dolgoprudny	2021–22	Russian FNL	1	0	0	0	–		–		1	0
Career total			23	3	9	2	-	-	-	-	32	5
