= Koldunov =

Koldunov (Russian: Колдунов) is a Russian masculine surname originating from the noun koldun (a wizard), its feminine counterpart is Koldunova. It may refer to the following notable people:

- Aleksandr Koldunov (1923–1992), Russian flying ace
- Nikita Koldunov (born 2000), Russian football player
