= Nikita Kalugin =

Russian footballer

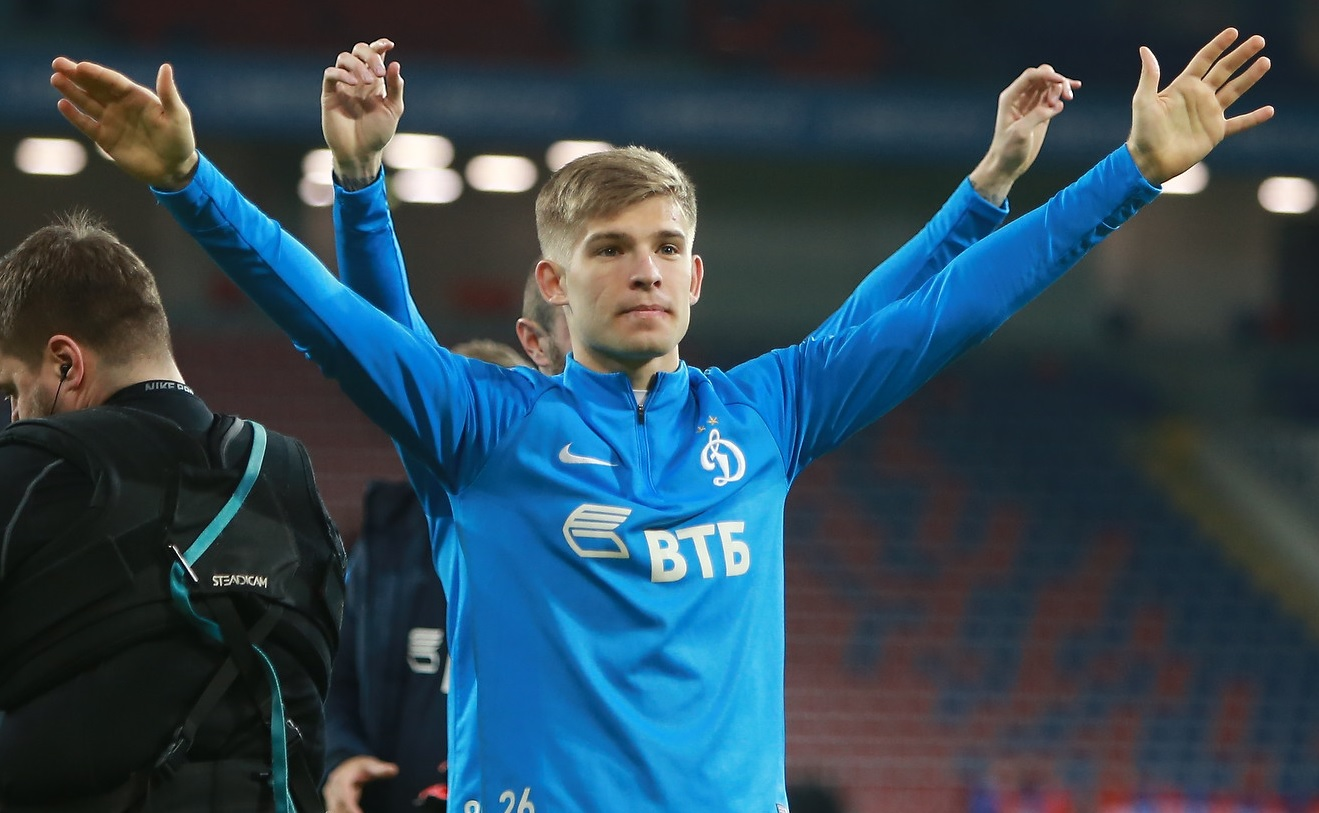
- Kalugin with Dynamo Moscow in 2018

Personal information
- Full name: Nikita Konstantinovich Kalugin
- Date of birth: 12 March 1998 (age 28)
- Place of birth: Krasnoye-na-Volge, Russia
- Height: 1.81 m (5 ft 11 1/2 in)
- Position: Centre-back

Team information
- Current team: Leningradets Leningrad Oblast
- Number: 44

Youth career
- –2009: Diamant Krasnoye-na-Volge
- 2009–2012: Konoplyov football academy
- 2012–2016: Dynamo Moscow

Senior career*
Years	Team	Apps	(Gls)
2016–2018	Dynamo Moscow	7	(0)
2016	→ Dynamo-2 Moscow	10	(0)
2018–2020	Sochi	44	(0)
2021–2023	Neftekhimik Nizhnekamsk	68	(1)
2023–2024	Torpedo Moscow	15	(1)
2024	→ Leningradets Leningrad Oblast (loan)	13	(0)
2024	→ Tyumen (loan)	3	(0)
2025–	Leningradets Leningrad Oblast	46	(2)

International career
2013	Russia U-15	3	(0)
2013–2014	Russia U-16	6	(0)
2015	Russia U-17	20	(0)
2015–2016	Russia U-18	8	(0)
2016	Russia U-19	5	(0)
2017–2019	Russia U-21	10	(1)
- * Club domestic league appearances and goals as of 13 June 2026

Nikita Konstantinovich Kalugin (Russian: Никита Константинович Калугин; born 12 March 1998) is a Russian football player who plays as centre back for Leningradets Leningrad Oblast.

== Club career ==
He made his debut in the Russian Professional Football League for Dynamo-2 Moscow on 28 July 2016 in a game against Domodedovo Moscow.

He made his debut in the Russian Premier League for Sochi on 13 July 2019 in a game against Spartak Moscow.

== International ==
He represented Russia national under-17 football team in the 2015 UEFA European Under-17 Championship.

== Career statistics ==
=== Club ===
As of 13 May 2018

Club	Season	League			Cup		Continental		Total	
Club	Season	Division	Apps	Goals	Apps	Goals	Apps	Goals	Apps	Goals
FC Dynamo Moscow	2014–15	Premier League	0	0	0	0	0	0	0	0
FC Dynamo Moscow	2015–16	Premier League	0	0	0	0	–		0	0
FC Dynamo Moscow	2016–17	National League	7	0	0	0	–		7	0
FC Dynamo-2 Moscow	2016–17	Professional League	10	0	–		–		0	0
FC Dynamo Moscow	2017–18	Premier League	0	0	1	0	–		1	0
FC Dynamo Moscow	Total		7	0	1	0	0	0	8	0
Career total			17	0	1	0	0	0	18	0
