= Elmir Nabiullin =

Russian footballer (born 1995)

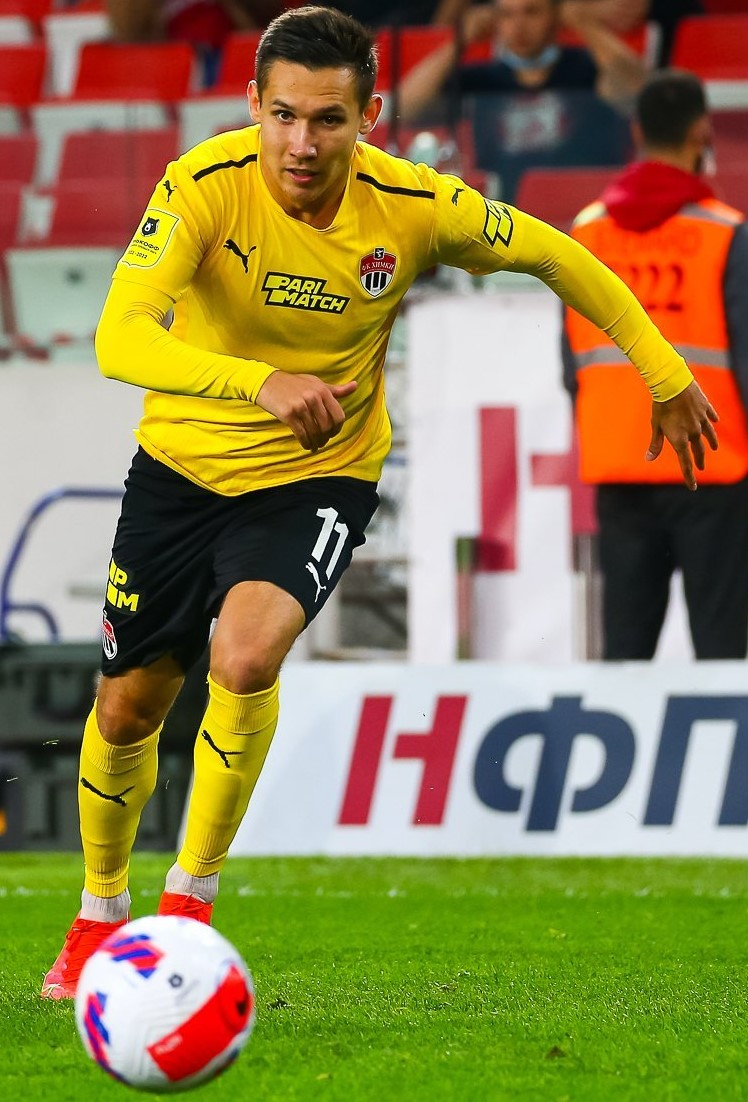
- Nabiullin with FC Khimki in 2021

Personal information
- Full name: Elmir Ramilevich Nabiullin
- Date of birth: 8 March 1995 (age 31)
- Place of birth: Kazan, Tatarstan, Russia
- Height: 1.76 m (5 ft 9 in)
- Position: Left-back

Youth career
- DYuSShOR-14 Kazan
- 2008–2013: Rubin Kazan

Senior career*
Years	Team	Apps	(Gls)
2014–2018	Rubin Kazan	85	(4)
2018–2019	Zenit St. Petersburg	13	(0)
2019–2021	Sochi	36	(0)
2021–2022	Khimki	20	(1)
2022–2023	Pari NN	9	(0)
2023	Rubin Kazan	3	(0)

International career
2011	Russia U-16	9	(1)
2011–2012	Russia U-17	10	(1)
2013	Russia U-18	6	(0)
2013–2014	Russia U-19	5	(0)
2014	Russia U-21	2	(0)
2015	Russia	1	(0)
- * Club domestic league appearances and goals

Elmir Ramilevich Nabiullin (Russian: Эльмир Рамилевич Набиуллин, Tatar: Әлмир Рамил улы Набиуллин; born 8 March 1995) is a Russian former professional footballer who played as a left-back.

== Club career ==
Nabiullin made his debut in the Russian Premier League on 9 March 2014 for FC Rubin Kazan in a game against FC Anzhi Makhachkala. His first coach was Renat Rashidovich Ibragimov.

On 15 February 2018, he signed a 4.5-year contract with Zenit St. Petersburg.

On 8 July 2019, he moved to the Russian Premier League newcomer PFC Sochi.

On 6 July 2021, he signed with Khimki. On 16 July 2022, Nabiullin's contract with Khimki was terminated by mutual consent.

On 15 August 2022, Nabiullin joined Pari Nizhny Novgorod on a two-year contract. Nabiullin was released by Pari Nizhny Novgorod on 10 February 2023.

== International ==
Nabiullin made his debut for the Russia national football team on 31 March 2015 in a friendly game against Kazakhstan.

== Honours ==
Zenit Saint Petersburg

- Russian Premier League: 2018–19

== Career statistics ==
=== Club ===
As of match played 27 November 2022

Club	Season	League			Cup		Continental		Total	
Club	Season	Division	Apps	Goals	Apps	Goals	Apps	Goals	Apps	Goals
Rubin Kazan	2013–14	RPL	6	0	0	0	0	0	6	0
Rubin Kazan	2014–15	RPL	25	1	1	0	–		26	1
Rubin Kazan	2015–16	RPL	16	1	0	0	8 (Note: Appearances in the UEFA Europa League)	0	24	1
Rubin Kazan	2016–17	RPL	24	1	3	0	–		27	1
Rubin Kazan	2017–18	RPL	14	1	1	0	–		15	1
Rubin Kazan	Total		85	4	5	0	8	0	98	4
Zenit St. Petersburg	2017–18	RPL	2	0	–		0	0	2	0
Zenit St. Petersburg	2018–19	RPL	11	0	2	0	7	0	20	0
Zenit St. Petersburg	Total		13	0	2	0	7	0	22	0
Sochi	2019–20	RPL	20	0	1	0	–		21	0
Sochi	2020–21	RPL	16	0	3	0	–		19	0
Sochi	Total		36	0	4	0	0	0	40	0
Khimki	2021–22	RPL	20	1	1	0	–		21	1
Pari NN	2022–23	RPL	9	0	4	0	–		13	0
Career total			163	5	16	0	15	0	194	5

=== International ===
Russian national team
Year	Apps	Goals
2015	1	0
Total	1	0

Statistics accurate as of match played 31 March 2015
