= Andrei Bychkov =

Russian professional football player

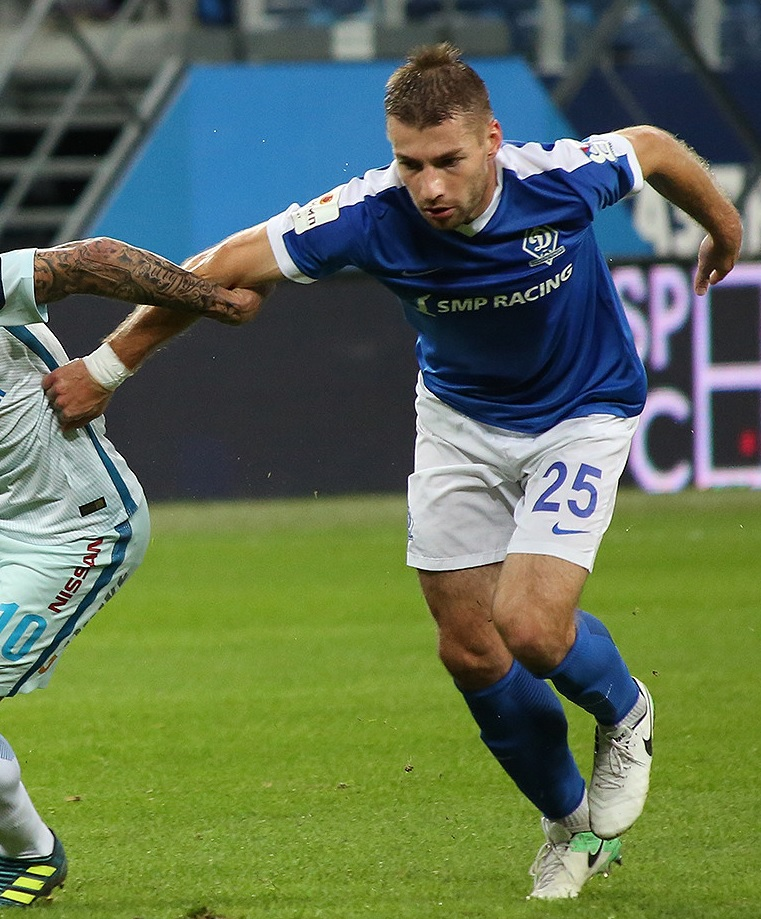
- Bychkov with Dynamo St. Petersburg in 2017

Personal information
- Full name: Andrei Aleksandrovich Bychkov
- Date of birth: 13 July 1988 (age 38)
- Place of birth: Moscow, Russian SFSR
- Height: 1.85 m (6 ft 1 in)
- Position: Defender

Senior career*
Years	Team	Apps	(Gls)
2007	FC Dynamo Moscow	0	(0)
2009	FC Dmitrov	35	(3)
2010	FC Gornyak Uchaly	11	(1)
2011	FC Salyut Belgorod	6	(1)
2011–2012	FC Mostovik-Primorye Ussuriysk	18	(1)
2012–2013	FC Volga Tver	21	(2)
2013–2017	FC Dolgoprudny	108	(16)
2017–2018	FC Dynamo Saint Petersburg	33	(1)
2018–2019	PFC Sochi	7	(0)
2019–2020	FC Chayka Peschanokopskoye	23	(1)
2020	FC Tom Tomsk	6	(0)
2020	FC Chayka Peschanokopskoye	5	(0)
2021	FC Olimp-Dolgoprudny	11	(0)
2021–2022	FC Olimp-Dolgoprudny-2	24	(2)
2022–2024	FC Kosmos Dolgoprudny	9	(0)
- * Club domestic league appearances and goals

Andrei Aleksandrovich Bychkov (Russian: Андрей Александрович Бычков; born 13 July 1988) is a Russian former professional football player.

== Club career ==
He made his Russian Football National League debut for FC Dynamo Saint Petersburg on 8 July 2017 in a game against FC Yenisey Krasnoyarsk.
