= Nikita Koldunov =

Russian footballer (born 2000)

Personal information
- Full name: Nikita Olegovich Koldunov
- Date of birth: 19 April 2000 (age 26)
- Place of birth: Saint Petersburg, Russia
- Height: 1.78 m (5 ft 10 in)
- Position: Midfielder

Team information
- Current team: Zvezda St. Petersburg
- Number: 10

Youth career
- –2019: Zenit St. Petersburg

Senior career*
Years	Team	Apps	(Gls)
2019–2021	Sochi	2	(1)
2021	→ Zenit-2 St. Petersburg (loan)	12	(2)
2021–2022	Zenit-2 St. Petersburg	23	(3)
2022–2024	Chayka Peschanokopskoye	42	(2)
2024–2025	Dynamo St. Petersburg	28	(6)
2026–	Zvezda St. Petersburg	25	(2)
- * Club domestic league appearances and goals as of 1 November 2026

Nikita Olegovich Koldunov (Russian: Никита Олегович Колдунов; born 19 April 2000) is a Russian football player who plays for Zvezda St. Petersburg.

== Club career ==
Koldunov is a product of the academy of Zenit St. Petersburg and was first included in their Russian Premier League roster for the 2016–17 season. For the next three seasons, he played for their Under-20 squad, without making any appearances for the senior team. In the summer of 2019, he was one of 10 players that transferred from Zenit to the Russian Premier League newcomer Sochi.

He made his debut in the Russian Premier League for Sochi on 8 December 2019 in a game against Rubin Kazan. He substituted Nikita Burmistrov in the 62nd minute.

On 12 February 2021, Koldunov joined Zenit-2 St. Petersburg on loan.

On 30 July 2021 he returned to Zenit-2 St. Petersburg on a one-year contract.
