= Rostislav Soldatenko =

Russian footballer

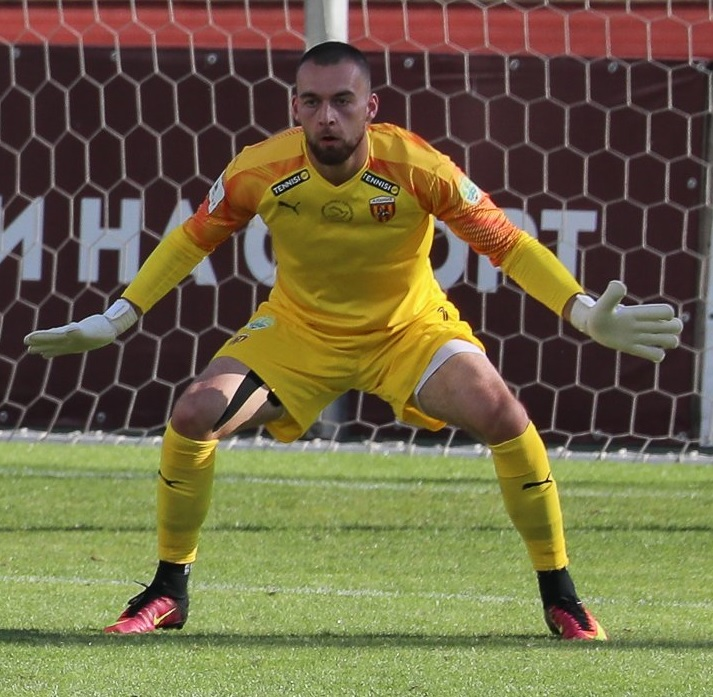
- Soldatenko with Alania in 2021

Personal information
- Full name: Rostislav Azarovich Soldatenko
- Date of birth: 25 May 1997 (age 29)
- Place of birth: Vladikavkaz, Russia
- Height: 1.90 m (6 ft 3 in)
- Position: Goalkeeper

Team information
- Current team: Torpedo Moscow
- Number: 25

Youth career
- 2004–2013: Alania Vladikavkaz

Senior career*
Years	Team	Apps	(Gls)
2013	Alania Vladikavkaz	0	(0)
2014	Neftekhimik Nizhnekamsk	0	(0)
2014	TSK Simferopol	0	(0)
2015	TSK Simferopol (KFS)		
2015	Neftekhimik Nizhnekamsk	1	(0)
2016–2017	SKA Rostov-on-Don	53	(1)
2018	Dynamo Saint Petersburg	2	(0)
2018–2020	Sochi	3	(0)
2019–2020	→ Alania Vladikavkaz (loan)	15	(0)
2020–2024	Alania Vladikavkaz	151	(0)
2025	Chernomorets Novorossiysk	13	(0)
2025–	Torpedo Moscow	20	(0)

International career
2012–2013	Russia U-16	4	(0)
- * Club domestic league appearances and goals as of 16 May 2026

Rostislav Azarovich Soldatenko (Russian: Ростислав Азарович Солдатенко; born 25 May 1997) is a Russian football player who plays for Torpedo Moscow.

== Club career ==
He made his debut in the Russian Professional Football League for Neftekhimik Nizhnekamsk on 8 October 2015 in a game against Dynamo Kirov.

On 30 October 2016, he scored a goal for SKA Rostov-on-Don against Chayka Peschanokopskoye after kicking the ball off from his own penalty box.

He made his Russian Football National League debut for Dynamo Saint Petersburg on 6 May 2018 in a game against Baltika Kaliningrad.

On 16 July 2019, he joined Alania Vladikavkaz on loan. On 4 August 2020, Alania bought out his rights from Sochi and signed a three-year contract with him.

On 11 June 2025, Soldatenko signed with Torpedo Moscow.
