= Hovhannes Nazaryan =

Armenian footballer (born 1998)

Personal information
- Date of birth: 11 March 1998 (age 28)
- Place of birth: Yerevan, Armenia
- Height: 1.85 m (6 ft 1 in)
- Position: Centre-back

Youth career
- –2016: FC Pyunik

Senior career*
| Years | Team | Apps | (Gls) |
| 2016–2018 | Pyunik-2 | 22 | (1) |
| 2016–2018 | Pyunik | 3 | (0) |
| 2018–2020 | FC Artsakh/Noah | 29 | (0) |
| 2020–2021 | Shirak | 21 | (0) |
| 2021–2023 | Ararat Yerevan | 26 | (1) |
| 2023–2024 | Van | 19 | (0) |

International career^{‡}
| 2016 | Armenia U19 | 5 | (0) |
| 2018–2020 | Armenia U21 | 8 | (0) |
| 2022– | Armenia | 1 | (0) |
- * Club domestic league appearances and goals as of 25 May 2024 ‡ National team caps and goals as of 15:30, 29 March 2022 (UTC)

Hovhannes Nazaryan (Armenian: Հովհաննես Նազարյան, born 11 March 1998) is an Armenian professional footballer who plays as a centre-back is currently a free agent. He plays for the Armenia national team.

== Club career ==
Nazaryan is a product of Pyunik's youth system. After making several appearances for the first team both in the Armenian Premier League and in UEFA Europa League qualifiers, and playing for the reserve team, in 2018 he left the club in order to join newly promoted side FC Artsakh (later renamed to FC Noah).

At the end of the 2019–20 season, after winning an Armenian Cup with Noah, Nazaryan left the club.

In the summer of 2020, Nazaryan signed a one-year contract with fellow top-tier side Shirak.

After Shirak left the Armenian Premier League at the end of the 20-21 season, Nazaryan transferred to Ararat Yerevan for free, which he left in June 2023.

At 1 August 2023 Nazaryan joined Van. He left the club on 3 July 2024.

== International career ==
Nazaryan has represented Armenia at several youth international levels, having featured for the under-19 and under-21 national teams.

In November 2021, he received his first call-up to the Armenian senior national team for the 2022 FIFA World Cup qualifying matches against North Macedonia and Germany, respectively. He was an unused substitute in the former game.

Having been called up again in March 2022 for a friendly match against Norway, as a replacement for an injured defender André Calisir, Nazaryan made his senior international debut on 29 March, coming on as a substitute as Armenia eventually suffered a 9–0 defeat.

== Personal life ==
Nazaryan's father, Rafael Nazaryan, a former footballer and Armenian senior international himself, currently serves as head coach for both BKMA Yerevan and the Armenia under-21 national team.

His elder brother, Erik Nazaryan, is also a former professional footballer, and currently manages the Armenian under-15 national team.

== Career statistics ==
=== International ===
As of 29 March 2022

Armenia
| Year | Apps | Goals |
|---|---|---|
| 2022 | 1 | 0 |
| Total | 1 | 0 |

== Honours ==
Noah

- Armenian Cup: 2019–20
