= Maksim Yermakov =

Russian footballer

Personal information
- Full name: Maksim Vladimirovich Yermakov
- Date of birth: 21 April 1995 (age 31)
- Place of birth: Kamensk-Uralsky, Sverdlovsk Oblast, Russia
- Height: 1.80 m (5 ft 11 in)
- Position: Midfielder

Youth career
- –2013: Krasnodar
- 2013–2016: Spartak Moscow

Senior career*
Years	Team	Apps	(Gls)
2011	Krasnodar	0	(0)
2013–2014	Spartak-2 Moscow	3	(0)
2016	Stumbras	6	(0)
2017	Pyunik	4	(0)
2018	Artsakh	1	(0)
2019	Sinara Kamensk-Uralsky		
2020	Kafa Feodosia	3	(0)
2020	Tuapse	10	(0)
2021	Isloch Minsk Raion	3	(0)
2021	Mashuk-KMV Pyatigorsk	2	(0)
2021	Metallurg Vidnoye	13	(2)
- * Club domestic league appearances and goals

Maksim Vladimirovich Yermakov (Russian: Максим Владимирович Ермаков; born 21 April 1995) is a Russian former footballer.

== Career ==
=== Club ===
Yermakov made his debut in the Russian Professional Football League for FC Spartak-2 Moscow on 30 July 2013 in a game against FC Vityaz Podolsk. Yermakov left FC Pyunik at the start of the winter break during the 2017–18 season.

== Career statistics ==
=== Club ===
As of match played 15 October 2017

Appearances and goals by club, season and competition
Club	Season	League			National Cup		Continental		Other		Total	
Club	Season	Division	Apps	Goals	Apps	Goals	Apps	Goals	Apps	Goals	Apps	Goals
Krasnodar	2011–12	Russian Premier League	0	0	0	0	–		–		0	0
Krasnodar	2012–13	Russian Premier League	0	0	0	0	–		–		0	0
Krasnodar	Total		0	0	0	0	-	-	-	-	0	0
Spartak Moscow	2012–13	Russian Premier League	0	0	0	0	0	0	–		0	0
Spartak Moscow	2013–14	Russian Premier League	0	0	0	0	0	0	–		0	0
Spartak Moscow	2014–15	Russian Premier League	0	0	0	0	–		–		0	0
Spartak Moscow	2015–16	Russian Premier League	0	0	0	0	–		–		0	0
Spartak Moscow	2016–17	Russian Premier League	0	0	0	0	0	0	–		0	0
Spartak Moscow	Total		0	0	0	0	0	0	-	-	0	0
Spartak-2 Moscow	2013–14	Russian Football League	3	0	–		–		–		3	0
Spartak-2 Moscow	2015–16	Russian National League	0	0	–		–		–		0	0
Spartak-2 Moscow	2016-17	Russian National League	0	0	–		–		–		0	0
Spartak-2 Moscow	Total		3	0	-	-	-	-	-	-	3	0
Stumbras	2016	A Lyga	6	0	1	0	–		–		7	0
Pyunik	2017–18	Armenian Premier League	4	0	1	0	0	0	–		5	0
Artsakh	2018–19	Armenian Premier League	1	0	0	0	–		–		1	0
Career total			13	0	2	0	0	0	-	-	15	0
