= Nikita Burmistrov =

Russian footballer

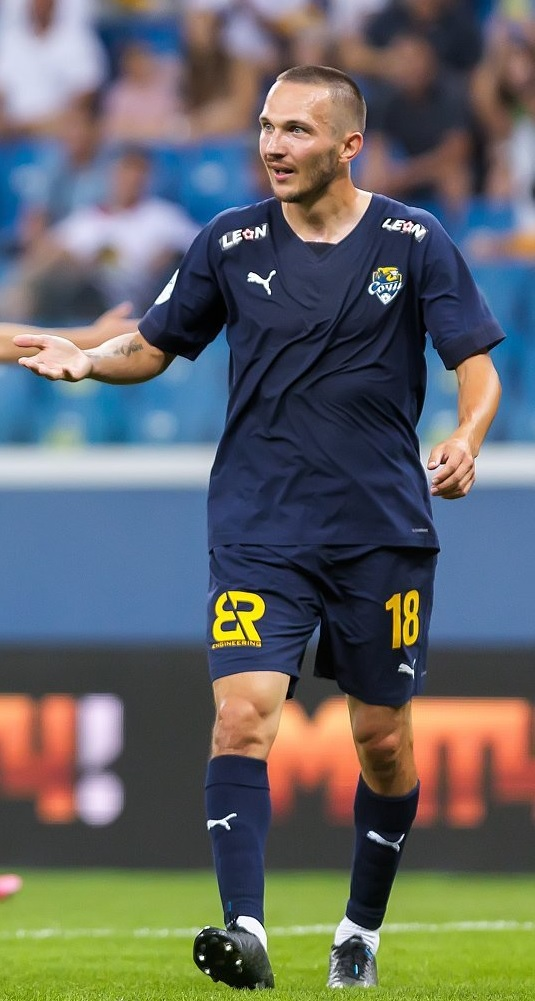
- Burmistrov with Sochi in 2022

Personal information
- Full name: Nikita Aleksandrovich Burmistrov
- Date of birth: 6 July 1989 (age 37)
- Place of birth: Primorsk, Russian SFSR
- Height: 1.84 m (6 ft 0 in)
- Position: Right winger

Youth career
- CSKA Moscow

Senior career*
Years	Team	Apps	(Gls)
2007–2009	CSKA Moscow	6	(0)
2008	→ Luch-Energiya Vladivostok (loan)	4	(0)
2009	→ Shinnik Yaroslavl (loan)	34	(12)
2010–2012	Amkar Perm	44	(8)
2012–2014	Anzhi Makhachkala	17	(1)
2013	→ Amkar Perm (loan)	13	(2)
2014–2016	Krasnodar	5	(0)
2015	→ Tom Tomsk (loan)	5	(0)
2015–2016	→ Ural Yekaterinburg (loan)	12	(0)
2016–2017	Arsenal Tula	20	(2)
2017	Baltika Kaliningrad	5	(0)
2018	Rotor Volgograd	9	(1)
2018–2025	Sochi	154	(13)

International career
2006	Russia U-17	6	(1)
2007	Russia U-19	8	(3)
2010	Russia U-21	1	(0)
2012	Russia-2	1	(0)
- * Club domestic league appearances and goals

Nikita Aleksandrovich Burmistrov (Russian: Ники́та Алекса́ндрович Бурми́стров; born 6 July 1989) is a Russian former footballer who played as a right winger, left winger and centre-forward.

== Career ==
=== Club career ===
In February 2010, Burmistrov moved from CSKA Moscow to Amkar Perm. In September 2012, Burmistrov moved from Amkar Perm to Anzhi Makhachkala, before moving back to Amkar on loan till the end of the 2012–13 season in January 2013. Upon the conclusion of the 2012-13 season, Amkar and Anzhi agreed to extend the loan deal for the 2013–14, however after Anzhi sold the majority of their star players in a "change of direction" for the development of the club, Burmistrov returned to Anzhi in August 2013.

In June 2014, Burmistrov left Anzhi, moving to Krasnodar on a three-year contract.

On 30 May 2023, Burmistrov extended his contract with Sochi.

== Career statistics ==
As of match played 31 May 2025

Appearances and goals by club, season and competition
Club	Season	League			Cup		Continental		Other		Total	
Club	Season	Division	Apps	Goals	Apps	Goals	Apps	Goals	Apps	Goals	Apps	Goals
CSKA Moscow	2007	Russian Premier League	6	0	1	0	—		—		7	0
Luch-Energiya	2008	Russian Premier League	4	0	0	0	—		—		4	0
Shinnik Yaroslavl	2009	Russian First League	34	12	1	0	—		—		35	12
Amkar Perm	2010	Russian Premier League	8	0	1	0	—		—		9	0
Amkar Perm	2011–12	Russian Premier League	29	5	3	0	—		—		32	5
Amkar Perm	2012–13	Russian Premier League	7	3	—		—		—		7	3
Anzhi Makhachkala	2012–13	Russian Premier League	4	0	2	1	0	0	—		6	1
Amkar Perm	2012–13	Russian Premier League	10	2	—		—		—		10	2
Amkar Perm	2013–14	Russian Premier League	3	0	—		—		—		3	0
Amkar Perm	Total		57	10	4	0	0	0	0	0	61	10
Anzhi Makhachkala	2013–14	Russian Premier League	13	1	0	0	6 (Note: Appearances in UEFA Europa League)	1	—		19	2
Anzhi Makhachkala	Total		17	1	2	1	6	1	0	0	25	3
Krasnodar	2014–15	Russian Premier League	5	0	1	0	4	1	—		10	1
Tom Tomsk	2014–15	Russian First League	5	0	—		—		—		5	0
Ural Yekaterinburg	2015–16	Russian Premier League	12	0	2	0	—		—		14	0
Arsenal Tula	2016–17	Russian Premier League	20	2	0	0	—		—		20	2
Baltika Kaliningrad	2017–18	Russian First League	5	0	1	0	—		—		6	0
Rotor Volgograd	2017–18	Russian First League	9	1	—		—		5 (Note: Appearances in the FNL Cup)	0	14	1
Sochi	2018–19	Russian First League	31	3	1	1	—		—		32	4
Sochi	2019–20	Russian Premier League	23	1	1	0	—		—		24	1
Sochi	2020–21	Russian Premier League	21	6	3	0	—		—		24	6
Sochi	2021–22	Russian Premier League	26	0	1	0	4 (Note: Appearances in UEFA Conference League)	1	—		31	1
Sochi	2022–23	Russian Premier League	21	0	4	1	—		—		25	1
Sochi	2023–24	Russian Premier League	24	3	6	1	—		—		30	4
Sochi	2024–25	Russian First League	8	0	2	0	—		1 (Note: Appearance in the promotion play-offs)	0	11	0
Sochi	Total		154	13	18	3	4	1	1	0	177	17
Career total			328	39	30	4	14	3	6	0	378	46
