= 2021–22 Russian Cup =

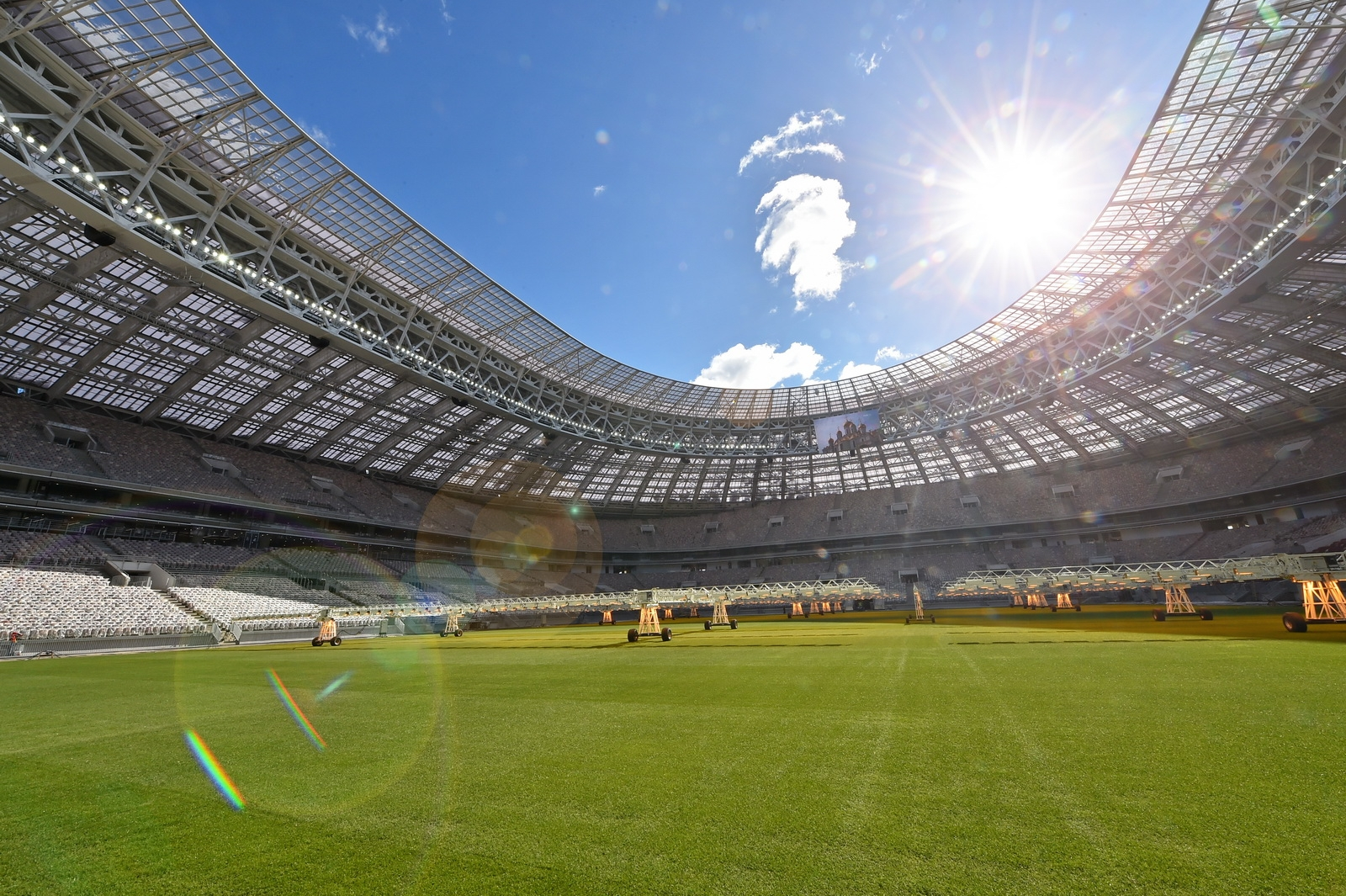
- Luzhniki Stadium in Moscow, Russia

Tournament details
- Country: Russia
- Teams: 99

Final positions
- Champions: Spartak Moscow (4th title)
- Runners-up: Dynamo Moscow

Tournament statistics
- Matches played: 109
- Goals scored: 287 (2.63 per match)
- Attendance: 239,242 (2,195 per match)
- Top goal scorer(s): Vyacheslav Shvyrev Quincy Promes (4 goals)
- All statistics correct as of 29 May 2022.

The 2021–22 Russian Cup was the 30th season of the Russian football knockout tournament since the dissolution of the Soviet Union. The competition qualification started on 14 July 2021 and it concluded on 29 May 2022. The final was attended by almost 70,000 fans at the Luzhniki Stadium.

The winner of the cup would normally win entry into the 2022–23 UEFA Europa League; however, on 28 February 2022, Russian football clubs were suspended from FIFA & UEFA international competitions until further notice. The Russian invasion of Ukraine was cited as the reason. Nevertheless, the winners do qualify for the 2022 Russian Super Cup.

== Round dates ==
The schedule of the competition is as follows.

Phase	Round	Match date
Qualifying rounds	Round 1	14/18 July 2021
Qualifying rounds	Round 2	28 July 2021
Qualifying rounds	Round 3	4/11/12 August 2021
Group stage	matchday 1	25/26 August 2021
Group stage	matchday 2	22/23 September 2021
Group stage	matchday 3	26/27 October 2021
Knockout stage	Round of 16	1/2/3 March 2022
Knockout stage	Quarter Final	19/20 April 2022
Knockout stage	Semi Final	10/11 May 2022
Knockout stage	Final	29 May 2022

== Teams ==
Round	Clubs remaining	Clubs involved	Winners from previous round	New entries this round
Round 1	94	42	0	0
Round 2	73	44	21	23
Round 3	51	36	22	14
Group stage	33	33	18	15
Round of 16	16	16	11	5
Quarter Final	8	8	8	0
Semi Final	4	4	4	0
Final	2	2	2	0

== Qualifying round ==
=== Round 1 ===
14 July 2021 Q.Round 1	Dynamo Barnaul	1–1 (4–2 p)	Novosibirsk	Barnaul
12:30 MSK (UTC+3)	Zavjalov 21'	Report	Petukhov 8' (o.g.)	Stadium: Dynamo Stadium; Attendance: 1,120

14 July 2021 Q.Round 1	Nosta Novotroitsk	1–3	Torpedo Miass	Novotroitsk
14:00 MSK (UTC+3)	Ignatenko 31'	Report	Zamyatin 22'; Emeljanov 73'; Semenov 79'	Stadium: Metallurg Stadium; Attendance: 350

14 July 2021 Q.Round 1	Lada-Tolyatti	0–4	Spartak Tuymazy	Tolyatti
14:00 MSK (UTC+3)		Report	Kirichenko 7'; Petrolay 10' (pen.); Zhuravlev 23'; Badrtdinov 29'	Stadium: Torpedo Stadium; Attendance: 235

14 July 2021 Q.Round 1	Amkar Perm	2–2 (2–3 p)	Tyumen	Perm
14:30 MSK (UTC+3)	Golubtsov 4'; Tyukalov 43'	Report	Shadrin 10'; Karpov 87'	Stadium: Perm Velikaya Manege; Attendance: 350

14 July 2021 Q.Round 1	Yadro Saint Petersburg	0–2	Zvezda Saint Petersburg	Saint Petersburg
15:00 MSK (UTC+3)		Report	Yashchuk 22'; Vartanian 80'	Stadium: Nova Arena

14 July 2021 Q.Round 1	Dynamo Saint Petersburg	2–2 (11–10 p)	Chita	Saint Petersburg
15:00 MSK (UTC+3)	Alferov 7' (pen.); Shikov 57'	Report	Nesterov 58' 79'	Stadium: Petrovsky Stadium

14 July 2021 Q.Round 1	Znamya Truda Orekhovo-Zuyevo	1–1 (3–4 p)	Peresvet Podolsk	Orekhovo-Zuyevo
16:00 MSK (UTC+3)	Vazitdinov 69'	Report	Masleny 3'	Stadium: Znamya Truda Stadium; Attendance: 300

14 July 2021 Q.Round 1	Znamya Noginsk	3–0	Kolomna	Noginsk
16:00 MSK (UTC+3)	Karev 45'; Pavlyuchenko 87'; Dolgov 90'	Report		Stadium: Istomkino Stadium; Attendance: 300

14 July 2021 Q.Round 1	Smolensk	0–0 (3–2 p)	Luki-Energiya Velikiye Luki	Smolensk
16:00 MSK (UTC+3)		Report		Stadium: Spartak Stadium

14 July 2021 Q.Round 1	Sakhalin Yuzhno-Sakhalinsk	0–2	Dynamo Vladivostok	Chertanovo
16:00 MSK (UTC+3)		Report	Sadov 13'; Korzhunov 90+3'	Stadium: Arena Chertanovo

14 July 2021 Q.Round 1	Kvant Obninsk	0–3	Kairat Moscow	Obninsk
16:00 MSK (UTC+3)		Report	Shvyrev 73' 86'; Abdulla 78'	Stadium: Trud Stadium; Attendance: 235

14 July 2021 Q.Round 1	Khimik Dzerzhinsk	0–0 (1–3 p)	Volna Nizhny Novgorod Oblast	Dzerzhinsk
16:00 MSK (UTC+3)		Report		Stadium: Khimik Stadium; Attendance: 250

14 July 2021 Q.Round 1	Saransk	1–0	Zenit Penza	Saransk
16:00 MSK (UTC+3)	Timoshkin 50'	Report		Stadium: Mordovia Arena

14 July 2021 Q.Round 1	Avangard Kursk	6–0	Salyut Belgorod	Kursk
16:30 MSK (UTC+3)	Yarygin 42'; Myazin 55'; Imullin 62'; Saprunov 81'; Gershun 85'; Mokhammad 90+5' (pen.)	Report		Stadium: Trudovye Rezervy Stadium; Attendance: 529

14 July 2021 Q.Round 1	Torpedo Vladimir	2–0	Murom	Vladimir
17:00 MSK (UTC+3)	Zharov 17' 51'	Report		Stadium: Torpedo Stadium; Attendance: 760

14 July 2021 Q.Round 1	Krasava Odintsovo	3–0	Vidnoye	Moscow
17:00 MSK (UTC+3)	Chikanchi 40'; Kusaev 68'; Rabadanov 90'	Report		Stadium: SG Luzhniki; Attendance: 500

18 July 2021 Q.Round 1	Mashuk-KMV Pyatigorsk	4–0	Yessentuki	Pyatigorsk
15:00 MSK (UTC+3)	Rodin 37' 54'; Dulaev 72'; Podkovyrov 88' (pen.)	Report		Stadium: Central Stadium

18 July 2021 Q.Round 1	Biolog-Novokubansk	3–3 (4–3 p)	Tuapse	Progress
15:00 MSK (UTC+3)	Kargin 36'; Salahetdinov 40'; Tsiberkin 45+1' (pen.)	Report	Logunov 17' 48'; Zaporozhtsev 55'	Stadium: Progress Stadium; Attendance: 500

18 July 2021 Q.Round 1	Spartak Nalchik	3–2	Dynamo Makhachkala	Nalchik
16:00 MSK (UTC+3)	Bogatyrev 14' 44'; Khutov 75'	Report	Gitinov 67'; Khalimbekov 77' (pen.)	Stadium: Spartak Stadium; Attendance: 100

18 July 2021 Q.Round 1	StavropolAgroSoyuz Nevinnomyssk	2–4	Dynamo Stavropol	Stavropol
16:00 MSK (UTC+3)	Saverskiy 28'; Kablakhov 52'	Report	Kuchiev 33'; Maysultanov 35' 71'; Garanzha 90'	Attendance: 235

18 July 2021 Q.Round 1	Forte Taganrog	3–0	Druzhba Maykop	Taganrog
16:30 MSK (UTC+3)	Pogrebnyak 15' 62'; Yurchenko 17'	Report		Stadium: Forte Arena

=== Round 2 ===
28 July 2021 Q.Round 2	Strogino Moscow	0–3	Krasava Odintsovo	Moscow
11:00 MSK (UTC+3)		Report	Arsen Tsogoyev 10'; Ivan Zakharov 14'; Nikita Shaleyev 19'	Stadium: Yantar Stadium; Attendance: 50

28 July 2021 Q.Round 2	Zvezda Saint Petersburg	1–0	Tver	Saint Petersburg
14:00 MSK (UTC+3)	Stanislav Kurmanov 86'	Report		Stadium: Nova Arena

28 July 2021 Q.Round 2	Irtysh Omsk	1–2	Dynamo Barnaul	Omsk
14:00 MSK (UTC+3)	Vladislav Levin 52'	Report	Kobyalko 55'; Zavyalov 69'	Stadium: Red Star Stadium; Attendance: 1,600

28 July 2021 Q.Round 2	Torpedo Miass	2–0	Chelyabinsk	Miass
14:00 MSK (UTC+3)	Denis Zamyatin 3'; Dmitri Kuzmin 75'	Report		Stadium: Trud Stadium; Attendance: 1,000

28 July 2021 Q.Round 2	Spartak Tuymazy	1–1 (2–4 p)	Volga Ulyanovsk	Tuymazy
14:30 MSK (UTC+3)	Vyacheslav Zhuravlyov 62'	Report	Ilya Maksimenkov 47'	Stadium: Spartak Stadium; Attendance: 500

28 July 2021 Q.Round 2	Rodina Moscow	2–3	Torpedo Vladimir	Moscow
14:30 MSK (UTC+3)	I. Andreyev 10'; Nikita Goldobin 48'	Report	Andrei Gladyshev 22'; Aleksandr Zenin 31'; N. Andreyev 87' (pen.)	Stadium: Oktyabr Stadium; Attendance: 100

28 July 2021 Q.Round 2	Legion Dynamo Makhachkala	0–0 (4–2 p)	Spartak Nalchik	Makhachkala
14:30 MSK (UTC+3)		Report		Stadium: Dynamo Stadium; Attendance: 400

28 July 2021 Q.Round 2	Ilpar Ilyinsky	0–3	Zenit-Izhevsk	Perm
14:30 MSK (UTC+3)		Report	Aleksandr Russkikh 22'; Dvornikov 72'; Simonov 85'	Stadium: Stadion Zvezda; Attendance: 350

28 July 2021 Q.Round 2	Tyumen	0–0 (5–4 p)	Zvezda Perm	Tyumen
15:00 MSK (UTC+3)		Report		Stadium: Geolog Stadium

28 July 2021 Q.Round 2	SKA Rostov-on-Don	0–0 (6–7 p)	Forte Taganrog	Rostov-on-Don
15:00 MSK (UTC+3)		Report		Stadium: SKA SKVO Stadium

28 July 2021 Q.Round 2	Anzhi Makhachkala	0–0 (4–2 p)	Mashuk-KMV Pyatigorsk	Kaspiysk
15:00 MSK (UTC+3)		Report		Stadium: Sokol; Attendance: 50

28 July 2021 Q.Round 2	Kairat Moscow	1–0	Kaluga	Odintsovo
15:30 MSK (UTC+3)	Shvyryov 24'	Report		Stadium: Central Stadium

28 July 2021 Q.Round 2	Volna Nizhny Novgorod Oblast	0–0 (5–4 p)	Shinnik Yaroslavl	Nizhny Novgorod
16:00 MSK (UTC+3)		Report		Stadium: Lokomotiv Stadium; Attendance: 300

28 July 2021 Q.Round 2	Saratov Sokol Saratov	2–3	Saransk	Saratov
16:00 MSK (UTC+3)	Vladislav Faskhutdinov 11'; Perchenok 19'	Report	Sobolev 18'; Khleborodov 32' 46'	Stadium: Lokomotiv Stadium; Attendance: 980

28 July 2021 Q.Round 2	Leningradets Leningrad Oblast	4–0	Dynamo Saint Petersburg	Saint Petersburg
16:00 MSK (UTC+3)	Khlusov 5' 52'; Yegor Kortsov 66'; Andrei Anisimov 74'	Report		Stadium: Kirovets Stadium

28 July 2021 Q.Round 2	Dynamo Vladivostok	2–1	Chernatovo Moscow	Chertanovo
16:00 MSK (UTC+3)	Sadov 42' 90+1'	Report	Molodnyakov 77'	Stadium: Arena Chertanovo; Attendance: 150

28 July 2021 Q.Round 2	Dynamo Stavropol	1–0	Kuban-Holding Pavlovskaya	Stavropol
16:00 MSK (UTC+3)	Mikhail Borisov 75'	Report		Stadium: Dynamo Stadium

28 July 2021 Q.Round 2	Dynamo Bryansk	1–1 (7–6 p)	Smolensk	Bryansk
16:00 MSK (UTC+3)	Yan Shanin 68'	Report	Aleksei Sergiyenko 90+4'	Stadium: Dynamo Stadium

28 July 2021 Q.Round 2	Peresvet Podolsk	1–1 (4–3 p)	Ryazan	Domodedovo
16:30 MSK (UTC+3)	Islam Yevloyev 47'	Report	Aleksander Barkov 21'	Stadium: Avangard Stadium; Attendance: 490

28 July 2021 Q.Round 2	Saturn Ramenskoye	0–2	Znamya Noginsk	Ramenskoye
17:00 MSK (UTC+3)		Report	Pavlyuchenko 83'; Sergei Karev 87'	Stadium: Saturn Stadium; Attendance: 450

28 July 2021 Q.Round 2	Chayka Peschanokopskoye	2–0	Avangard Kursk	Peschanokopskoye
17:00 MSK (UTC+3)	Oleynikov 51' (pen.), 90+4'	Report		Stadium: Chayka Central Stadium

28 July 2021 Q.Round 2	Chernomorets Novorossiysk	Walkover	Biolog-Novokubansk
17:00 MSK (UTC+3)		Report

=== Round 3 ===
4 August 2021 Q.Round 3	Yenisey Krasnoyarsk	2–1	Akron Tolyatti	Krasnoyarsk
13:00 MSK (UTC+3)	Ivanov 42'; Skvortsov 52'	Report	Babayev 65'	Stadium: Central Stadium

4 August 2021 Q.Round 3	Metallurg Lipetsk	1–0	Tekstilshchik Ivanovo	Lipetsk
15:00 MSK (UTC+3)	Kutyin 53'	Report		Stadium: Metallurg Stadium; Attendance: 1,800

4 August 2021 Q.Round 3	Volgar Astrakhan	1–1 (2–4 p)	Kuban Krasnodar	Astrakhan
16:00 MSK (UTC+3)	Butenko 90+1'	Report	Dyshekov 35' (pen.)	Stadium: Central Stadium

4 August 2021 Q.Round 3	Veles Moscow	0–0 (9–8 p)	Tom Tomsk	Domodedovo
16:00 MSK (UTC+3)		Report		Stadium: Avangard Stadium; Attendance: 500

4 August 2021 Q.Round 3	KAMAZ Naberezhnye Chelny	1–0	Neftekhimik Nizhnekamsk	Naberezhnye Chelny
16:00 MSK (UTC+3)	Yanushkovsky 40'	Report		Stadium: KAMAZ Stadium; Attendance: 1,290

4 August 2021 Q.Round 3	Torpedo Moscow	0–0 (4–2 p)	SKA-Khabarovsk	Moscow
17:00 MSK (UTC+3)		Report		Stadium: Sportivnyy Gorodok Luzhniki; Attendance: 450

4 August 2021 Q.Round 3	Fakel Voronezh	2–1	Olimp-Dolgoprudny	Voronezh
17:00 MSK (UTC+3)	Shepilov 1'; Razborov 38'	Report	Bakhtiyarov 77' (pen.)	Stadium: Tsentralnyi Profsoyuz Stadion; Attendance: 3,512

11 August 2021 Q.Round 3	Zvezda Saint Petersburg	1–2	Leningradets Leningrad Oblast	Saint Petersburg
14:00 MSK (UTC+3)	Plotnikov 25'	Report	Pinchuk 53'; Kazakov 56'	Stadium: Petrovsky Stadium

11 August 2021 Q.Round 3	Zenit-Izhevsk	2–1	Torpedo Miass	Izhevsk
14:00 MSK (UTC+3)	Aleksandr Russkikh 44'; Dvornikov 78'	Report	Anatoli Semyonov 28'	Stadium: Kupol; Attendance: 400

11 August 2021 Q.Round 3	Dynamo Vladivostok	0–1	Kairat Moscow	Odintsovo
14:00 MSK (UTC+3)		Report	Shvyryov 77'	Stadium: Central Stadium; Attendance: 133

11 August 2021 Q.Round 3	Volga Ulyanovsk	0–2	Saransk	Ulyanovsk
15:00 MSK (UTC+3)		Report	Khleborodov 5'; V. Sysuyev 44'	Stadium: Trud Stadium; Attendance: 800

11 August 2021 Q.Round 3	Forte Taganrog	1–1 (5–6 p)	Chayka Peschanokopskoye	Taganrog
15:00 MSK (UTC+3)	Yurchenko 59'	Report	Orlov 90+4'	Stadium: Forte Arena

11 August 2021 Q.Round 3	Volna Nizhny Novgorod Oblast	0–2	Torpedo Vladimir	Nizhny Novgorod
16:00 MSK (UTC+3)		Report	Maksim Sass 5'; Krivtsov 15'	Stadium: Lokomotiv Stadium; Attendance: 300

11 August 2021 Q.Round 3	Peresvet Podolsk	0–2	Znamya Noginsk	Domodedovo
16:00 MSK (UTC+3)		Report	Pavlyuchenko 10'; Aleksandr Ivashchov 82'	Stadium: Avangard Stadium; Attendance: 400

11 August 2021 Q.Round 3	Dynamo Stavropol	3–1	Biolog-Novokubansk	Stavropol
16:00 MSK (UTC+3)	Kuchiyev 40' 58'; Sergei Tskanyan 90+8'	Report	Denis Vasenin 26'	Stadium: Dynamo Stadium

11 August 2021 Q.Round 3	Krasava Odintsovo	1–2	Dynamo Bryansk	Moscow
17:00 MSK (UTC+3)	Kryuchkov 90' (pen.)	Report	Maksim Novikov 45+2'; Nikita Kashayev 65'	Stadium: SG Luzhniki; Attendance: 535

12 August 2021 Q.Round 3	Dynamo Barnaul	2–2 (4–2 p)	Tyumen	Barnaul
11:00 MSK (UTC+3)	Kobyalko 28' 32'	Report	Karpov 20'; Tyurin 55'	Stadium: Dynamo Stadium; Attendance: 1,500

12 August 2021 Q.Round 3	Legion Dynamo Makhachkala	2–0	Anzhi Makhachkala	Makhachkala
14:00 MSK (UTC+3)	Akhyadov 8'; Rashid Magomedov 85'	Report		Stadium: Dynamo Stadium; Attendance: 400

== Elite group round (1/32 and 1/16 finals) ==
At this stage, 11 RPL teams enter the tournament, not playing in European competition. They are joined by 11 FNL teams and 11 PFL teams, winners of the last stage of the cup. The selection takes place in 11 groups. Each group contains one team from RPL, FNL and PFL.

The group stage will be held in 3 rounds. Teams from the lower leagues will play matches at home:

- 1st round. August 25–26. PFL v FNL.
- 2nd round. September 22–23. PFL v RPL.
- 3rd round. October 27. FNL v RPL.

The system of scoring and determining the winners in the group round based on the results of each match:

- for winning in regulation time - 3 points.
- for a draw in regulation time and a victory on penalties - 2 points.
- for a draw in regulation time and defeat on penalties - 1 point.
- points are not awarded for a defeat in regular time.

=== Group 1 ===
Pos	Team	Pld	W	PW	PL	L	GF	GA	GD	Pts	Qualification
1	Kuban Krasnodar (2) (Q)	2	1	0	0	1	3	1	+2	3	Advance to Play-off
2	Krasnodar (1)	2	1	0	0	1	2	3	−1	3	
3	Leningradets Leningrad Oblast (3)	2	1	0	0	1	1	2	−1	3	

Rules for classification: 1) Points; 2) Wins; 3) Goal differential; 4) Goals scored; 5) Head-to-head result; 6) Disciplinary points.
(Q) Qualified to the phase indicated

25 August 2021 Group St.	Leningradets Leningrad Oblast	1–0	Kuban Krasnodar	Saint Petersburg
15:00 MSK (UTC+3)	Votinov 88'	Report		Stadium: Kirovets Stadium; Attendance: 250

22 September 2021 Group St.	Leningradets Leningrad Oblast	0–2	Krasnodar	Saint Petersburg
14:00 MSK (UTC+3)		Report	Chernikov 42'; Krychowiak 85'	Stadium: Kirovets Stadium; Attendance: 249

27 October 2021 Group St.	Kuban Krasnodar	3–0	Krasnodar	Krasnodar
14:00 MSK (UTC+3)	Lauk 6' 63'; Aleynikov 23'	Report		Stadium: Kuban Stadium; Attendance: 5,502

=== Group 2 ===
Pos	Team	Pld	W	PW	PL	L	GF	GA	GD	Pts	Qualification
1	KAMAZ Naberezhnye Chelny (2) (Q)	2	2	0	0	0	2	0	+2	6	Advance to Play-off
2	Ural Yekaterinburg (1)	2	1	0	0	1	2	1	+1	3	
3	Torpedo Vladimir (3)	2	0	0	0	2	0	3	−3	0	

Rules for classification: 1) Points; 2) Wins; 3) Goal differential; 4) Goals scored; 5) Head-to-head result; 6) Disciplinary points.
(Q) Qualified to the phase indicated

25 August 2021 Group St.	Torpedo Vladimir	0–1	KAMAZ Naberezhnye Chelny	Vladimir
16:00 MSK (UTC+3)		Report	Ignatenko 86'	Stadium: Torpedo Stadium; Attendance: 1,122

23 September 2021 Group St.	Torpedo Vladimir	0–2	Ural Yekaterinburg	Vladimir
16:00 MSK (UTC+3)		Report	Yegorychev 1'; Panyukov 16'	Stadium: Torpedo Stadium; Attendance: 498; Referee: Yaroslav Khromey

27 October 2021 Group St.	KAMAZ Naberezhnye Chelny	1–0	Ural Yekaterinburg	Naberezhnye Chelny
17:00 MSK (UTC+3)	Musayev 90'	Report		Stadium: KAMAZ Stadium; Attendance: 1,000; Referee: Aleksandr Mashlyakevich

=== Group 3 ===
Pos	Team	Pld	W	PW	PL	L	GF	GA	GD	Pts	Final result
1	Arsenal Tula (1) (Q)	2	1	1	0	0	7	2	+5	5	Advance to Play-off
2	Veles Moscow (2)	2	1	0	1	0	4	1	+3	4	
3	Dynamo Bryansk (3)	2	0	0	0	2	1	9	−8	0	

Rules for classification: 1) Points; 2) Wins; 3) Goal differential; 4) Goals scored; 5) Head-to-head result; 6) Disciplinary points.
(Q) Qualified to the phase indicated

25 August 2021 Group St.	Dynamo Bryansk	0–3	Veles Moscow	Bryansk
16:00 MSK (UTC+3)		Report	Tarasov 44'; Smith 60'; Galoyan 89'	Stadium: Dynamo Stadium

22 September 2021 Group St.	Dynamo Bryansk	1–6	Arsenal Tula	Bryansk
16:00 MSK (UTC+3)	Novikov 45+2'	Report	Sokol 11'; Panchenko 14'; Khlusevich 19'; Kangwa 44'; Davitashvili 58'; Tudorie 86'	Stadium: Dynamo Stadium; Attendance: 500

27 October 2021 Group St.	Veles Moscow	1–1 (3–4 p)	Arsenal Tula	Moscow
14:00 MSK (UTC+3)	Galoyan 75'	Report	Kangwa 33'	Stadium: Avangard Stadium; Attendance: 360
	Penalties
	Osipov (penalty missed); Galoyan (penalty scored); Lopatin (penalty missed); Yezhkov (penalty scored); Kertanov (penalty scored)		(penalty scored) Lutsenko; (penalty scored) Kostadinov; (penalty missed) Davitashvili; (penalty scored) Kangwa; (penalty scored) Tkachyov

=== Group 4 ===
Pos	Team	Pld	W	PW	PL	L	GF	GA	GD	Pts	Qualification
1	Nizhny Novgorod (1) (Q)	2	2	0	0	0	2	0	+2	6	Advance to Play-off
2	Fakel Voronezh (2)	2	1	0	0	1	2	1	+1	3	
3	Dynamo Barnaul (3)	2	0	0	0	2	0	3	−3	0	

Rules for classification: 1) Points; 2) Wins; 3) Goal differential; 4) Goals scored; 5) Head-to-head result; 6) Disciplinary points.
(Q) Qualified to the phase indicated

25 August 2021 Group St.	Dynamo Barnaul	0–2	Fakel Voronezh	Barnaul
14:00 KRAT (UTC+7)		Report	Kulishev 14'; Gruznov 45+1'	Stadium: Dynamo Stadium; Attendance: 2,120

22 September 2021 Group St.	Dynamo Barnaul	0–1	Nizhny Novgorod	Barnaul
13:30 KRAT (UTC+7)		Report	Berkovski 7'	Stadium: Dynamo Stadium; Attendance: 1,700

27 October 2021 Group St.	Fakel Voronezh	0–1	Nizhny Novgorod	Voronezh
19:00 MSK (UTC+3)		Report	Berkovski 40'	Stadium: Tsentralnyi Profsoyuz Stadion

=== Group 5 ===
Pos	Team	Pld	W	PW	PL	L	GF	GA	GD	Pts	Qualification
1	Chayka Peschanokopskoye (3) (Q)	2	2	0	0	0	2	0	+2	6	Advance to Play-off
2	Torpedo Moscow (2)	2	1	0	0	1	2	1	+1	3	
3	Rostov (1)	2	0	0	0	2	0	3	−3	0	

Rules for classification: 1) Points; 2) Wins; 3) Goal differential; 4) Goals scored; 5) Head-to-head result; 6) Disciplinary points.
(Q) Qualified to the phase indicated

26 August 2021 Group St.	Chayka Peschanokopskoye	1–0	Torpedo Moscow	Rostov-na-Donu
15:00 MSK (UTC+3)	Hawrylovich 40'	Report		Stadium: SKA SKVO Stadium

22 September 2021 Group St.	Chayka Peschanokopskoye	1–0	Rostov	Rostov-na-Donu
17:30 MSK (UTC+3)	Oleynikov 22'	Report		Stadium: Rostov Arena; Attendance: 1,207

27 October 2021 Group St.	Torpedo Moscow	2–0	Rostov	Moscow
14:00 MSK (UTC+3)	Kalmykov 60' (pen.); Abdrashitov 90+1'	Report		Stadium: Sportivnyy Gorodok Luzhniki; Attendance: 385

=== Group 6 ===
Pos	Team	Pld	W	PW	PL	L	GF	GA	GD	Pts	Final result
1	Alania Vladikavkaz (2) (Q)	2	2	0	0	0	5	2	+3	6	Advance to Play-off
2	Ufa (1)	2	0	1	0	1	1	3	−2	2	
3	Legion Dynamo Makhachkala (3)	2	0	0	1	1	3	4	−1	1	

Rules for classification: 1) Points; 2) Wins; 3) Goal differential; 4) Goals scored; 5) Head-to-head result; 6) Disciplinary points.
(Q) Qualified to the phase indicated

25 August 2021 Group St.	Legion Dynamo Makhachkala	2–3	Alania Vladikavkaz	Makhachkala
13:30 MSK (UTC+3)	Saaduev 48'; Abdulhamedov 79'	Report	Khosonov 72'; Bagaev 85'; Khabalov 90+5'	Stadium: Dynamo Stadium; Attendance: 450

22 September 2021 Group St.	Legion Dynamo Makhachkala	1–1 (0–2 p)	Ufa	Makhachkala
13:00 MSK (UTC+3)	Saaduev 60'	Report	Nikitin 90+4'	Stadium: Dynamo Stadium; Attendance: 1,000
	Penalties
	Murtazaliyev (penalty missed); Udunyan (penalty missed); Magomedov (penalty missed); Panayev (penalty missed)		Aliyev (penalty scored); Kamilov (penalty missed); Krotov (penalty scored)

27 October 2021 Group St.	Alania Vladikavkaz	2–0	Ufa	Grozny
14:00 MSK (UTC+3)	Kobesov 55' (pen.); Khadartsev 70'	Report		Stadium: Sultan Bilimkhanov Stadium; Attendance: 320

=== Group 7 ===
Pos	Team	Pld	W	PW	PL	L	GF	GA	GD	Pts	Final result
1	Rotor Volgograd (2) (Q)	2	1	1	0	0	4	1	+3	5	Advance to Play-off
2	Akhmat Grozny (1)	2	1	0	1	0	4	1	+3	4	
3	Kairat Moscow (3)	2	0	0	0	2	0	6	−6	0	

Rules for classification: 1) Points; 2) Wins; 3) Goal differential; 4) Goals scored; 5) Head-to-head result; 6) Disciplinary points.
(Q) Qualified to the phase indicated

25 August 2021 Group St.	Kairat Moscow	0–3	Rotor Volgograd	Odintsovo
14:00 MSK (UTC+3)		Report	Malyarov 23' 40'; Chukanov 71'	Stadium: Central Stadium; Attendance: 430

22 September 2021 Group St.	Kairat Moscow	0–3	Akhmat Grozny	Odintsovo
14:00 MSK (UTC+3)		Report	Kadyrov 18' (pen.); Iancu 57' (pen.); Aduyev 79'	Stadium: Central Stadium; Attendance: 198

27 October 2021 Group St.	Rotor Volgograd	1–1 (4–2 p)	Akhmat Grozny	Volgograd
14:00 MSK (UTC+3)	Pervushin 37'	Report	Utkin 80'	Stadium: Volgograd Arena; Attendance: 1,312
	Penalties
	Beriashvili (penalty scored); Chukanov (penalty scored); Makarov (penalty scored); Minayev (penalty scored)		Arkhipov (penalty missed); Putsko (penalty scored); Karapuzov (penalty scored); Konovalov (penalty missed)

=== Group 8 ===
Pos	Team	Pld	W	PW	PL	L	GF	GA	GD	Pts	Final result
1	Baltika Kaliningrad (2) (Q)	2	1	0	1	0	2	1	+1	4	Advance to Play-off
2	Khimki (1)	2	0	1	1	0	1	1	0	3	
3	Saransk (3)	2	0	1	0	1	2	3	−1	2	

Rules for classification: 1) Points; 2) Wins; 3) Goal differential; 4) Goals scored; 5) Head-to-head result; 6) Disciplinary points.
(Q) Qualified to the phase indicated

25 August 2021 Group St.	Saransk	1–2	Baltika Kaliningrad	Saransk
16:00 MSK (UTC+3)	Sorokin 45'	Report	Alshin 25'; Murtazayev 40'	Stadium: Mordovia Arena; Attendance: 952

22 September 2021 Group St.	Saransk	1–1 (7–6 p)	Khimki	Saransk
16:00 MSK (UTC+3)	Yusupov 62'	Report	Dolgov 11'	Stadium: Mordovia Arena; Attendance: 497
	Penalties
	Pustozyorov (penalty scored); Arkhipov (penalty missed); Tenyayev (penalty scored); Sobolev (penalty scored); Abramov (penalty scored); Simanov (penalty scored); Yusupov (penalty scored); Shebanov (penalty scored)		Karpov (penalty scored); Sokolov (penalty scored); Šabović (penalty missed); Idowu (penalty scored); Mirzov (penalty scored); Danilkin (penalty scored); Troshechkin (penalty scored); Dolgov (penalty missed)

27 October 2021 Group St.	Baltika Kaliningrad	0–0 (4–5 p)	Khimki	Kaliningrad
14:00 MSK (UTC+3)		Report		Stadium: Kaliningrad Stadium; Attendance: 500
	Penalties
	Murtazayev (penalty scored); Marković (penalty missed); Popov (penalty scored); Alshin (penalty scored); Dzhamilov (penalty scored); Meshchaninov (penalty missed)		Glushakov (penalty missed); Ademi (penalty scored); Sadygov (penalty scored); Filin (penalty scored); Sokolov (penalty scored); Karpov (penalty scored)

=== Group 9 ===
Pos	Team	Pld	W	PW	PL	L	GF	GA	GD	Pts	Qualification
1	Yenisey Krasnoyarsk (2) (Q)	2	2	0	0	0	5	0	+5	6	Advance to Play-off
2	Krylia Sovetov Samara (1)	2	1	0	0	1	10	1	+9	3	
3	Znamya Noginsk (3)	2	0	0	0	2	0	14	−14	0	

Rules for classification: 1) Points; 2) Wins; 3) Goal differential; 4) Goals scored; 5) Head-to-head result; 6) Disciplinary points.
(Q) Qualified to the phase indicated

25 August 2021 Group St.	Znamya Noginsk	0–4	Yenisey Krasnoyarsk	Noginsk
15:00 MSK (UTC+3)		Report	Lauk 50' 72'; Sanaya 80'; Maslovsky 85'	Stadium: Istomkino Stadium; Attendance: 455

22 September 2021 Group St.	Znamya Noginsk	0–10	Krylia Sovetov Samara	Noginsk
14:00 MSK (UTC+3)		Report	Lipovoy 8'; Tsypchenko 20' 64' 71'; Pinyayev 22' 30'; Yakuba 77'; Sergeyev 83' 85'; Bijl 90'	Stadium: Istomkino Stadium; Attendance: 400

27 October 2021 Group St.	Yenisey Krasnoyarsk	1–0	Krylia Sovetov Samara	Krasnoyarsk
14:00 MSK (UTC+3)	Razdorskikh 83'	Report		Stadium: Central Stadium; Attendance: 500

=== Group 10 ===
Pos	Team	Pld	W	PW	PL	L	GF	GA	GD	Pts	Qualification
1	CSKA Moscow (1) (Q)	2	2	0	0	0	6	0	+6	6	Advance to Play-off
2	Metallurg Lipetsk (2)	2	1	0	0	1	2	3	−1	3	
3	Zenit-Izhevsk (3)	2	0	0	0	2	1	6	−5	0	

Rules for classification: 1) Points; 2) Wins; 3) Goal differential; 4) Goals scored; 5) Head-to-head result; 6) Disciplinary points.
(Q) Qualified to the phase indicated

25 August 2021 Group St.	Zenit-Izhevsk	1–2	Metallurg Lipetsk	Izhevsk
17:00 SAMT (UTC+4)	Myrzakov 90+3'	Report	Poyarkov 49'; Shapovalov 65'	Stadium: Kupol Stadium; Attendance: 300

23 September 2021 Group St.	Zenit-Izhevsk	0–4	CSKA Moscow	Izhevsk
15:15 SAMT (UTC+4)		Report	Akhmetov 9'; Kuchayev 24'; Zaynutdinov 76'; Zabolotny 90+1'	Stadium: Central Republican Stadium; Attendance: 2,500

26 October 2021 Group St.	Metallurg Lipetsk	0–2	CSKA Moscow	Lipetsk
18:00 MSK (UTC+3)		Report	Bohinen 41'; Bistrović 85'	Stadium: Metallurg Stadium; Attendance: 5,500

=== Group 11 ===
Pos	Team	Pld	W	PW	PL	L	GF	GA	GD	Pts	Qualification
1	Dynamo Moscow (1) (Q)	2	2	0	0	0	9	0	+9	6	Advance to Play-off
2	Orenburg (2)	2	1	0	0	1	3	4	−1	3	
3	Dynamo Stavropol (3)	2	0	0	0	2	1	9	−8	0	

Rules for classification: 1) Points; 2) Wins; 3) Goal differential; 4) Goals scored; 5) Head-to-head result; 6) Disciplinary points.
(Q) Qualified to the phase indicated

25 August 2021 Group St.	Dynamo Stavropol	1–3	Orenburg	Stavropol
16:00 MSK (UTC+3)	Daliev 24'	Report	Sychevoy 31'; Ektov 41'; Diallo 76'	Stadium: Dynamo Stadium; Attendance: 521

22 September 2021 Group St.	Dynamo Stavropol	0–6	Dynamo Moscow	Stavropol
16:00 MSK (UTC+3)		Report	Skopintsev 12'; Makarov 28'; Tyukavin 35'; Fomin 46'; Gladyshev 71'; Igboun 83'	Stadium: Dynamo Stadium; Attendance: 2,100

26 October 2021 Group St.	Orenburg	0–3	Dynamo Moscow	Orenburg
14:00 MSK (UTC+3)		Report	Tyukavin 8'; Moro 81'; Yevgenyev 87'	Stadium: Gazovik Stadium; Attendance: 499

== Knockout phase ==
Round of 16
Sochi	1
CSKA Moscow	2
Spartak Moscow	6
Kuban Krasnodar	1
Lokomotiv Moscow	0
Yenisey Krasnoyarsk	4
Rubin Kazan	2
Rotor Volgograd	1
Baltika Kaliningrad	3
Chaika Peschanokopskoye	0
Dynamo Moscow	3
Nizhny Novgorod	0
Alania Vladikavkaz	1
Arsenal Tula	0
Zenit Saint Petersburg	6
KAMAZ Naberezhnye Chelny	0

Quarterfinals
CSKA Moscow	0
Spartak Moscow	1
Yenisey Krasnoyarsk	3
Rubin Kazan	1
Baltika Kaliningrad	1 (4 (p))
Dynamo Moscow	1 (5 (p))
Alania Vladikavkaz	2 (6 (p))
Zenit Saint Petersburg	2 (5 (p))

Semifinals
Spartak Moscow	3
Yenisey Krasnoyarsk	0
Dynamo Moscow	3
Alania Vladikavkaz	0

Final
Spartak Moscow	2
Dynamo Moscow	1

=== Round of 16 ===
1 March 2022 Round of 16	Dynamo Moscow (1)	3–0	Nizhny Novgorod (1)	Moscow
20:00 MSK (UTC+3)	Fomin 45+2' (pen.); Grulyov 54', (yellow card) 60'; Smolov 86' (pen.); Makarov (yellow card) 90'	Report	Yuldoshev (yellow card) 59'; Gotsuk (yellow card) 84'	Stadium: VTB Arena; Attendance: 6,200

2 March 2022 Round of 16	Alania Vladikavkaz (2)	1–0	Arsenal Tula (1)	Grozny
16:00 MSK (UTC+3)	Khubulov 4'; Khabalov (yellow card) 19'; Kochiyev (yellow card) 37'; Kachmazov (yellow card) 90+2'	Report	Radaković (yellow card) 66'; Belyayev (yellow card) 70'; Čaušić (yellow card) 81'	Stadium: Sultan Bilimkhanov Stadium; Attendance: 800

2 March 2022 Round of 16	Sochi (1)	1–2	CSKA Moscow (1)	Sochi
18:00 MSK (UTC+3)	Margasov (yellow card) 7'; Noboa 41'; Terekhov (yellow card) 70'; Prokhin (yellow card) 75'; Popov (yellow card) 77'	Report	Akinfeev (yellow card) 39'; Diveyev 60', 87'; Mukhin (yellow card) 90'	Stadium: Fisht Olympic Stadium; Attendance: 4,952

2 March 2022 Round of 16	Spartak Moscow (1)	6–1	Kuban Krasnodar (2)	Moscow
20:00 MSK (UTC+3)	Promes 6', 17'; Nicholson 20', 62', 86'; Khlusevich (yellow card) 47'; Larsson 83'	Report	Sidorov (yellow card) 37'; Dzhikiya 55' (o.g.); Ediyev (yellow card) 61'; Sapeta (yellow card) 89'	Stadium: Otkritie Arena; Attendance: 2,915

3 March 2022 Round of 16	Lokomotiv Moscow (1)	0–4	Yenisey Krasnoyarsk (2)	Moscow
18:15 MSK (UTC+3)	Tiknizyan (yellow card) 27' (yellow-red card) 36'; Barinov (yellow card) 37'; Nenakhov (yellow card) 44'; Babkin (yellow card) 75'	Report	Kichin 25'; Lomakin 38' (pen.); Okladnikov 77'; Komkov 90+2'	Stadium: RZD Arena; Attendance: 3,047

3 March 2022 Round of 16	Rubin Kazan (1)	2–1	Rotor Volgograd (2)	Kazan
19:00 MSK (UTC+3)	Vitaly Lisakovich 28' (pen.), 73' (pen.); Musaev (yellow card) 41'; Lomovitsky (yellow card) 53'	Report	Minayev 12'; Tashayev (yellow card) 36'; Obukhov (yellow card) 42'; Chukanov (yellow card) 52'; Makhatadze (yellow card) 78'	Stadium: Ak Bars Arena; Attendance: 3,398

3 March 2022 Round of 16	Baltika Kaliningrad (2)	3–0	Chayka Peschanokopskoye (3)	Kaliningrad
20:00 MSK (UTC+3)	Kašćelan (yellow card) 31'; Popov 56' (pen.); Tishkin (yellow card) 69'; Ostojić 75'; Maksimenko 86'	Report	Yeliseyev (yellow card) 21'; Volkov (yellow card) 27'; Lyakh (yellow card) 34'	Stadium: Kaliningrad Stadium; Attendance: 4,998

3 March 2022 Round of 16	Zenit Saint Petersburg (1)	6–0	KAMAZ Naberezhnye Chelny (2)	Saint Petersburg
20:15 MSK (UTC+3)	Mostovoy 17', 48'; Alberto 26', 45+2'; Yerokhin 37'; Dzyuba 85'	Report	Potapov (yellow card) 31'; Ayukin (yellow card) 76'	Stadium: Gazprom Arena; Attendance: 11,326

=== Quarter-finals ===
The draw was held on 4 March 2022 in 16:00 MSK (UTC+3) live on russian sports channel «Match TV» and media portal «Sportbox.ru».

Rules for the draw:

- Each team able to play against each team;
- If the team played their last game (round of 16) at home, in quarter-final stage the game will be played at away;
- If the 2 teams on round of 16 played their game at home (or away), in quarter-final «home team» was determined by first team that was ball out.

On 30 March make available dates of the matches.

19 April 2022 Quarter-final	Baltika Kaliningrad (2)	1–1 (4–5 p)	Dynamo Moscow (1)	Kaliningrad Stadium, Kaliningrad
20:00 MSK (UTC+3)	Alshin (yellow card) 16'; Meshchaninov (yellow card) 59'; Popov (yellow card) 72'; Geloyan 84'	Report	Parshivlyuk (yellow card) 45'; Makarov 35'; Smolov (yellow card) 89'; Grulyov (yellow card) 90+2'	Attendance: 16,555; Referee: Vladislav Bezborodov
	Penalties
	Aleynik (penalty missed); Popov (penalty scored); Alshin (penalty scored); Musayev (penalty scored); Kazayev (penalty scored)		(penalty scored) Szymański; (penalty scored) Smolov; (penalty scored) Zakharyan; (penalty scored) Lesovoy; (penalty scored) Fomin

20 April 2022 Quarter-final	Yenisey Krasnoyarsk (2)	3–1	Rubin Kazan (1)	Central Stadium, Krasnoyarsk
14:30 MSK (UTC+3)	Okladnikov 12', 32'; Glushkov 39'; Kichin (yellow card) 55'	Report	Kuznetsov (yellow card) 60'; Musayev (yellow card) 63'; Onugkha 86'	Attendance: 8,800; Referee: Pavel Shadykhanov

20 April 2022 Quarter-final	Alania Vladikavkaz (2)	2–2 (6–5 p)	Zenit Saint Petersburg (1)	Sultan Bilimkhanov Stadium, Grozny
17:00 MSK (UTC+3)	Shavlokhov (yellow card) 26'; Dav. Kobesov (yellow card) 39'; Gurtsiyev 55'; Zaseyev (yellow card) 59'; Kochiyev (yellow card) 59'; Khubulov (yellow card) 74'; Giorgobiani 90+2'	Report	Douglas Santos 71'; Sergeyev 81'	Attendance: 3,550; Referee: Pavel Kukuyan
	Penalties
	Soldatenko (penalty scored); Khadartsev (penalty missed); Mashukov (penalty scored); Tsarayev (penalty scored); Khosonov (penalty scored); Giorgobiani (penalty scored); Khugayev (penalty scored)		(penalty scored) Yuri Alberto; (penalty scored) Kuzyayev; (penalty scored) Sergeyev; (penalty missed) Sutormin; (penalty scored) Douglas Santos; (penalty scored) Malcom; (penalty missed) Krugovoy

20 April 2022 Quarter-final	CSKA Moscow (1)	0–1	Spartak Moscow (1)	VEB Arena, Moscow
19:30 MSK (UTC+3)	Carrascal (yellow card) 24'; Gbamin (yellow card) 36' (yellow-red card) 45+3'; Mukhin (yellow card) 37'; Zabolotny (yellow card) 68'; Shchennikov (yellow card) 78'; Fuchs (yellow card) 90+3'	Report	Bakayev 21' (pen.) (yellow card) 32'; Martins (yellow card) 43'; Caufriez (yellow card) 45+1'; Nicholson (yellow card) 78'; Sobolev (yellow card) 87'; Gigot (yellow card) 90+4'; Maksimenko (yellow card) 90+5'	Attendance: 22,325; Referee: Vladimir Moskalyov

=== Semi-finals ===
The draw will be held on 21 April 2022 in 21:00 MSK (UTC+3) live on russian sports channel «Match TV» and media portal «Sportbox.ru».

10 May 2022 Semi-final	Dynamo Moscow (1)	3–0	Alania Vladikavkaz (2)	Moscow
16:30 MSK (UTC+3)	Smolov 22'; Zakharyan 48'; Szymański (yellow card) 67'; Tyukavin 87' (yellow card) 90'	Report	Shavlokhov (yellow card) 34' (red card) 73'; Butayev (yellow card) 80'; Bagayev (yellow card) 86'; Grigoryev (yellow card) 87'	Stadium: VTB Arena; Attendance: 20,185; Referee: Vitali Meshkov

11 May 2022 Semi-final	Spartak Moscow (1)	3–0	Yenisey Krasnoyarsk (2)	Moscow
19:30 MSK (UTC+3)	Promes 21'; Martins (yellow card) 40'; Bakayev 56'; Sobolev 87'; Litvinov (yellow card) 90'	Report		Stadium: Otkritie Arena; Attendance: 12,260; Referee: Sergei Karasev

== Final ==
29 May 2022
17:00 MSK

Spartak Moscow	2–1	Dynamo Moscow
Sobolev 10'; Promes 72'	Report	Zakharyan 55'

Luzhniki Stadium, Moscow
Attendance: 69,306
Referee: Kirill Levnikov (St. Petersburg)
