= List of football stadiums in Russia =

The following is a list of football stadiums in Russia, ranked in order of capacity, with the minimum capacity being 10,000. Stadiums in italic are part of 2018 World Cup. Stadiums in bold are part of the 2024–25 Russian Premier League.

== Current stadiums ==
#	Image	Stadium	Capacity	City	Home team(s)	Opened	Renovated
1		Luzhniki Stadium	81,000	Moscow	Russia national football team (some matches), 1980 Summer Olympics, 2018 World Cup	1956	1996–1997, 2001–2004, 2013–2017
2		**Gazprom Arena**	60,177	Saint Petersburg	FC Zenit, 2017 Confederations Cup, 2018 World Cup, Euro 2020	2017	
3		Fisht Olympic Stadium	45,994	Sochi	PFC Sochi, 2014 Winter Olympics, 2017 Confederations Cup, 2018 World Cup	2013	
4		Volgograd Arena	45,568	Volgograd	FC Rotor Volgograd, 2018 World Cup	2018	
5		**Rostov Arena**	45,415	Rostov-on-Don	FC Rostov, 2018 World Cup	2018	
6		**Lukoil Arena**	44,897	Moscow	FC Spartak Moscow, 2017 Confederations Cup, 2018 World Cup	2014	
7		Mordovia Arena	44,442	Saransk	2018 World Cup	2018	
8		**Ak Bars Arena**	43,284	Kazan	FC Rubin Kazan, 2017 Confederations Cup, 2018 World Cup	2013	
9		**Nizhny Novgorod Stadium**	42,532	Nizhny Novgorod	FC Nizhny Novgorod, 2018 World Cup	2018	
10		**Solidarnost Samara Arena**	42,389	Samara	PFC Krylya Sovetov Samara, 2018 World Cup	2018	
11		Central Stadium	35,000	Yekaterinburg	FC Ural Sverdlovsk Oblast, 2018 World Cup	1957	2006–2011, 2014–2017
12		Kaliningrad Stadium	33,399	Kaliningrad	FC Baltika Kaliningrad, 2018 World Cup	2018	
13		**Krasnodar Stadium**	33,395	Krasnodar	FC Krasnodar	2016	
14		Metallurg Stadium	33,001	Samara	FC Krylya Sovetov Samara (until 2018)	1957	
15		Republican Spartak Stadium	32,464	Vladikavkaz	Alania Vladikavkaz	1962	2004
16		**Tsentralnyi Profsoyuz Stadion**	31,793	Voronezh	FC Fakel Voronezh	1930	
17		Kuban Stadium	31,654	Krasnodar	FC Kuban Krasnodar	1961	2008
18		**Akhmat-Arena**	30,597	Grozny	FC Akhmat Grozny	2011	
19		**VEB Arena**	30,433	Moscow	PFC CSKA	2016	
20		**Lokomotiv Stadium**	27,320	Moscow	FC Lokomotiv Moscow	2002	
21		Anzhi Arena	26,400	Kaspiysk	FC Dynamo Makhachkala	2003	2011–2013
22		**VTB Arena**	26,319	Moscow	FC Dynamo Moscow	1928	2019
23		Central Stadium	25,400	Kazan	FC Rubin Kazan (until 2014)	1960	
24		CSK Stadium	25,000	Ryazan	FC Ryazan	1980	2008
25		SKA SKVO Stadium	25,000	Rostov-on-Don	FC SKA Rostov-on-Don	1971	2007-
26		Shinnik Stadium	22,871	Yaroslavl	FC Shinnik Yaroslavl	1923	2008-2010
27		Central Stadium	22,500	Krasnoyarsk	FC Yenisey Krasnoyarsk	1967	
28		Petrovsky Stadium	21,725	Saint Petersburg	FC Zenit Saint Petersburg (until 2017)	1925	1933, 1961, 1978, 1994, 2010
29		Central Stadium	21,500	Astrakhan	FC Volgar Astrakhan	1955	2013
30		Arsenal Stadium	20,048	Tula	FC Arsenal Tula	1959	1996-1998, 2014
31		Torpedo Stadium	19,700	Vladimir	FC Torpedo Vladimir	1950	1958, 1978, 1988
32		Central Republican Stadium	19,100	Izhevsk	FC Zenit-Izhevsk Izhevsk	1946	1962, 2007, 2010
33		**Arena Khimki**	18,636	Khimki	FC Khimki	2008	
34		**Torpedo Stadium**	18,500	Togliatti	FC Lada-Togliatti Togliatti		
35		Lokomotiv Stadium	17,856	Nizhny Novgorod	FC Volga Nizhny Novgorod	1932	1997
36		Zvezda Stadium	17,000	Perm	FC Amkar Perm	1969	
37		Saturn Stadium	16,500	Ramenskoye	FC Saturn Moscow Oblast	1999	
38		Vanguard Stadium	16,000	Komsomolsk-on-Amur	FC Smena Komsomolsk-na-Amure		
39		Dynamo Stadium	16,000	Barnaul	FC Dynamo Barnaul	1927	
40		Olimp-2	15,840	Rostov-on-Don	FC Rostov (until 2018)	1930	2009
41		Dynamo Stadium	15,589	Stavropol	FC Dynamo Stavropol	1920	
42		Central Stadium	15,292	Oryol	FC Oryol		
43		**Dynamo Stadium**	15,200	Makhachkala	FC Dynamo Makhachkala	1927	
44		Lenin Stadium	15,200	Khabarovsk	FC SKA-Khabarovsk	1951	
45		Lokomotiv Stadium	15,200	Saratov	FC Sokol Saratov		
46		Neftyanik Stadium	15,132	Ufa	FC Ufa	1967	2015
47		PromAgro Stadium	15,000	Stary Oskol	FC Metallurg-Oskol Stary Oskol		
48		Trud Stadium	15,000	Tomsk	FC Tom Tomsk	1929	2005
49		Central Stadium	15,000	Chelyabinsk	FC Chelyabinsk		
50		Spartak Stadium	14,545	Petrozavodsk	FC Karelia Petrozavodsk		
51		Spartak Stadium	14,149	Nalchik	PFC Spartak Nalchik		
52		Amur Stadium	13,500	Blagoveshchensk	FC Amur-2010 Blagoveshchensk		
53		Eduard Streltsov Stadium	13,450	Moscow	FC Torpedo Moscow	1978	
54		Trade Unions Central Stadium	13,400	Murmansk	FC Sever Murmansk	1960	
55		Geolog Stadium	13,057	Tyumen	FC Tyumen	1983	2011
56		Trud Stadium	12,500	Novorossiysk	FC Chernomorets Novorossiysk		
57		Spartak Stadium	12,500	Novosibirsk	FC Novosibirsk		
58		Salyut Stadium	11,456	Belgorod	FC Salyut Belgorod		
59		Metallurg Stadium	11,000	Lipetsk	FC Metallurg Lipetsk	1957	1976, 1997, 1998
60		Dynamo Stadium	10,200	Vladivostok	FC Dynamo Vladivostok		
61		Slava Metreveli Central Stadium	10,200	Sochi			
62		Dynamo Stadium	10,100	Bryansk	FC Dynamo Bryansk		
63		**Gazovik Stadium**	10,046	Orenburg	FC Orenburg		
64		Stadium of the Academy of FC Ural	10,000	Yekaterinburg	FC Ural Sverdlovsk Oblast	1940	2015

== See also ==
- Football in Russia
- List of indoor arenas in Russia
- List of European stadiums by capacity
- List of association football stadiums by capacity
- List of association football stadiums by country
- List of sports venues by capacity
- Lists of stadiums
