= Sysuyev =

Sysuyev (Russian: Сысуев) is a Russian surname. The feminine form is Sysuyevа (Russian: Сысуева). Among those with this name are:

- Dmitri Sysuyev (born 1988), Russian footballer
- Nikolai Sysuyev (born 1999), Russian footballer
- Vladislav Sysuyev (born 1989), Russian footballer
- Yegor Sysuyev (born 1997), Russian footballer
- Yuri Sysuyev (born 1949), Russian naval officer
