= Nikita Andreyev (disambiguation) =

Nikita Andreyev (born 1988) is a Russian football player

Nikita Andreyev may also refer to:

- Nikita Andreyev (footballer, born March 1997), Russian football player, forward, started his career with Shinnik Yaroslavl
- Nikita Andreyev (footballer, born November 1997), Russian football player, midfielder, started his career with Zenit St. Petersburg
- Nikita Andreev (freestyle skier) (born 2004), Russian skier
