= Aleksandr Ermakov =

Aleksandr Ermakov may refer to:

- Aleksandr Yermakov, Russian footballer
- Aleksandr Ermakov (handballer), Russian handball player
