= Vladimir Stadium =

There are several stadiums in Vladimir city:

- Torpedo stadium - largest Vladimir football stadium;
- Lybed' - other stadium, in summer used for football, in winter - for skating.
