= Denis Sobolev =

Russian footballer

Personal information
- Full name: Denis Olegovich Sobolev
- Date of birth: 13 August 1993 (age 33)
- Place of birth: Saransk, Russia
- Height: 1.74 m (5 ft 9 in)
- Position: Midfielder

Senior career*
Years	Team	Apps	(Gls)
2010–2014	FC Mordovia Saransk	2	(0)
2013–2014	→ FC Zenit Penza (loan)	13	(0)
2014–2015	FC Neftekhimik Nizhnekamsk	19	(2)
2016–2017	KAMAZ Naberezhnye Chelny	19	(2)
2017–2020	FC Mordovia Saransk	47	(2)
2020–2021	FC Zenit Izhevsk	25	(7)
2021–2022	FC Saransk	32	(6)
2022–2024	FC Dynamo Bryansk	49	(5)
2024	FC Shumbrat Saransk	?	(?)

International career
2010	Russia U-17	7	(1)
2011	Russia U-18	6	(2)
2012	Russia U-19	1	(0)
- * Club domestic league appearances and goals

Denis Olegovich Sobolev (Russian: Денис Олегович Соболев; born 13 August 1993) is a Russian former professional footballer who played as a midfielder.

== Club career ==
Sobolev made his Russian Football National League debut for FC Mordovia Saransk on 25 September 2010 in a game against FC Rotor Volgograd.

== Personal life ==
His identical twin brother Anton Sobolev is also a former footballer.
