= Denis Shebanov =

Russian footballer

Personal information
- Full name: Denis Olegovich Shebanov
- Date of birth: 27 November 1989 (age 36)
- Place of birth: Saransk, Russian SFSR
- Height: 1.83 m (6 ft 0 in)
- Position: Goalkeeper

Youth career
- FC Mordovia Saransk

Senior career*
Years	Team	Apps	(Gls)
2010–2013	FC Mordovia Saransk	7	(0)
2013	FC KAMAZ Naberezhnye Chelny	12	(0)
2014–2016	FC Mordovia Saransk	1	(0)
2016	FC Armavir	16	(0)
2017	FC KAMAZ Naberezhnye Chelny	5	(0)
2017–2020	FC Mordovia Saransk	38	(0)
2020–2021	FC Kuban Krasnodar	15	(0)
2021–2022	FC Saransk	19	(0)
2022–2023	FC Kaluga	24	(0)
2023–2024	FC Dynamo Bryansk	20	(0)
- * Club domestic league appearances and goals as of 8 June 2024

Denis Olegovich Shebanov (Russian: Дени́с Оле́гович Шеба́нов; born 27 November 1989) is a Russian professional association football player.

== Club career ==
He made his Russian Football National League debut for FC Mordovia Saransk on 17 October 2010 in a game against FC Luch-Energiya Vladivostok.

== Personal life ==
His younger brother Alexey Shebanov is also a professional footballer.
