= Artyom Molodtsov =

Russian footballer

Personal information
- Full name: Artyom Igorevich Molodtsov
- Date of birth: 8 October 1990 (age 36)
- Place of birth: Saratov, Soviet Union
- Height: 1.74 m (5 ft 9 in)
- Positions: Defender; midfielder

Team information
- Current team: FC Shumbrat Saransk
- Number: 27

Senior career*
Years	Team	Apps	(Gls)
2007	FC Saturn Yegoryevsk	7	(0)
2008–2010	FC Saturn Moscow Oblast	0	(0)
2011–2012	FC Amkar Perm	5	(0)
2012–2013	FC Torpedo Moscow	29	(1)
2013–2014	FC Shinnik Yaroslavl	4	(1)
2014–2016	FC Sokol Saratov	70	(1)
2016–2017	FC Mordovia Saransk	26	(0)
2017–2019	FC Fakel Voronezh	59	(2)
2019–2025	FC Sokol Saratov	155	(8)
2025–2026	FC Volga Ulyanovsk	5	(0)
2026–	FC Shumbrat Saransk	26	(0)

International career
2008	Russia U-18	6	(1)
2009	Russia U-19	3	(0)
- * Club domestic league appearances and goals as of 31 October 2026

Artyom Igorevich Molodtsov (Russian: Артём Игоревич Молодцов; born 8 October 1990) is a Russian professional footballer who plays for FC Shumbrat Saransk.

== Club career ==
He made his professional debut in the Russian Second Division in 2007 for FC Saturn Yegoryevsk.

Molodtsov made his professional debut for FC Saturn Moscow Oblast on 14 July 2010 in the Russian Cup game against FC Sakhalin Yuzhno-Sakhalinsk.

He made his Russian Premier League debut for FC Amkar Perm on 13 March 2011 in a game against PFC CSKA Moscow.
