= Vyacheslav Verushkin =

Russian footballer

Personal information
- Full name: Vyacheslav Nikolayevich Verushkin
- Date of birth: 7 September 1989 (age 37)
- Place of birth: Saransk, Russian SFSR
- Height: 1.82 m (6 ft 0 in)
- Positions: Defender; midfielder

Team information
- Current team: Shumbrat Saransk
- Number: 31

Youth career
- Mordovia Saransk

Senior career*
| Years | Team | Apps | (Gls) |
| 2007–2010 | Mordovia Saransk | 36 | (0) |
| 2010 | → Zvezda Ryazan (loan) | 14 | (0) |
| 2012 | Salyut Belgorod | 0 | (0) |
| 2013 | Nosta Novotroitsk | 10 | (0) |
| 2014–2015 | Volga Ulyanovsk | 7 | (0) |
| 2016 | Ocean Kerch | 25 | (0) |
| 2017 | Saransk (amateur) | | |
| 2019–2020 | Dorozhnik Kamenka | | |
| 2024–2025 | Shumbrat Saransk (amateur) | | |
| 2026– | Shumbrat Saransk | 0 | (0) |
- * Club domestic league appearances and goals as of 31 October 2026

Vyacheslav Nikolayevich Verushkin (Russian: Вячеслав Николаевич Верушкин; born 7 September 1989) is a Russian professional football player who plays for Shumbrat Saransk.

== Club career ==
He played in the Russian Football National League for FC Mordovia Saransk in 2007.
