= Radik Yusupov =

Russian footballer

Personal information
- Full name: Radik Failyevich Yusupov
- Date of birth: 25 January 1993 (age 33)
- Place of birth: Saransk, Russia
- Height: 1.93 m (6 ft 4 in)
- Position: Defender

Team information
- Current team: Shumbrat Saransk
- Number: 11

Senior career*
Years	Team	Apps	(Gls)
2012–2013	Mordovia Saransk	1	(0)
2013	→ Volga Tver (loan)	12	(0)
2014–2015	Neftekhimik Nizhnekamsk	11	(0)
2015–2016	Kafa Feodosia		
2017	Ocean Kerch		
2017–2020	Mordovia Saransk	32	(3)
2020	Lada Dimitrovgrad	14	(1)
2021	Volga Ulyanovsk	9	(0)
2021–2022	Saransk	30	(4)
2024–2025	Shumbrat Saransk (amateur)		
2026–	Shumbrat Saransk	29	(6)
- * Club domestic league appearances and goals as of 31 October 2026

Radik Failyevich Yusupov (Russian: Радик Фаильевич Юсупов; born 25 January 1993) is a Russian football defender who plays for Shumbrat Saransk.

== Club career ==
He made his debut in the Russian Football National League for Mordovia Saransk on 13 July 2013 in a game against Dynamo St. Petersburg.
