= Krasnodar Stadium =

Football stadium in Krasnodar, Russia

Coordinates: 45°02′39″N 39°01′46″E

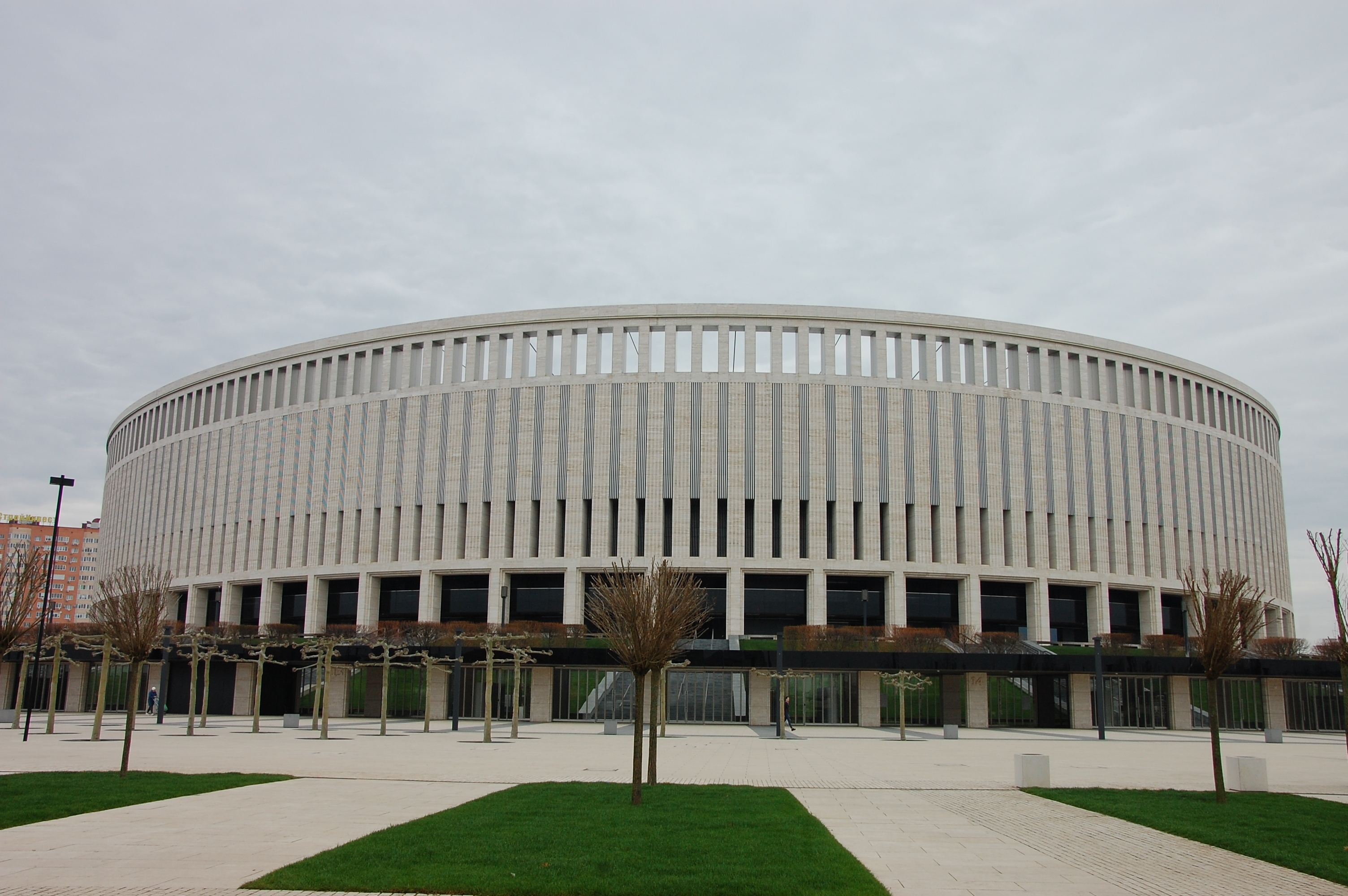
- Interactive map of Krasnodar Stadium
- Location: Krasnodar, Russia
- Capacity: 33,395
- Surface: Grass
- Record attendance: 35,249 (Krasnodar v Zenit, 13 April 2024)
- Field size: 105 x 68 m

Construction
- Groundbreaking: 2013
- Built: 2016
- Opened: 9 October 2016
- Cost: 20 billion RUB
- Architect: ESTA Construction

Tenant
- FC Krasnodar (2016–present)

Krasnodar Stadium (or Ozon Arena due to a sponsorship deal with Ozon) is a football stadium in Krasnodar, Russia. It hosts FC Krasnodar of the Russian Premier League. It has a capacity of 35,179 spectators.

The stadium was designed by von Gerkan, Marg and Partners (gmp) together with SPEECH architectural office and built by Contractor Esta Construction. The stadium's interior project was developed by Maxim Rymar Architectural Studio.

The stadium is surrounded by the Krasnodar park (popularly known as Galitsky Park), a large regular park that has become one of the city's top sights. The park was built at the expense of entrepreneur Sergey Galitsky and opened on September 28, 2017. The area is 22.7 hectares. More than 2.5 thousand trees are planted in the park: oak, hornbeam, alder, bonsai, poplar, pine, tulip tree, maple, thuja, and decorative plum.

Additionally, the stadium is known for its immersive fan experience and advanced technology. The 360-degree panoramic media screen is a key highlight that is integrated around the top tier of the stadium's interior, which is used to display real-time visuals, updates, and dynamic light during games. A modern heating system under the pitch is also equipped in the stadium, allowing for year-round play despite different weather condition.

== Gallery ==
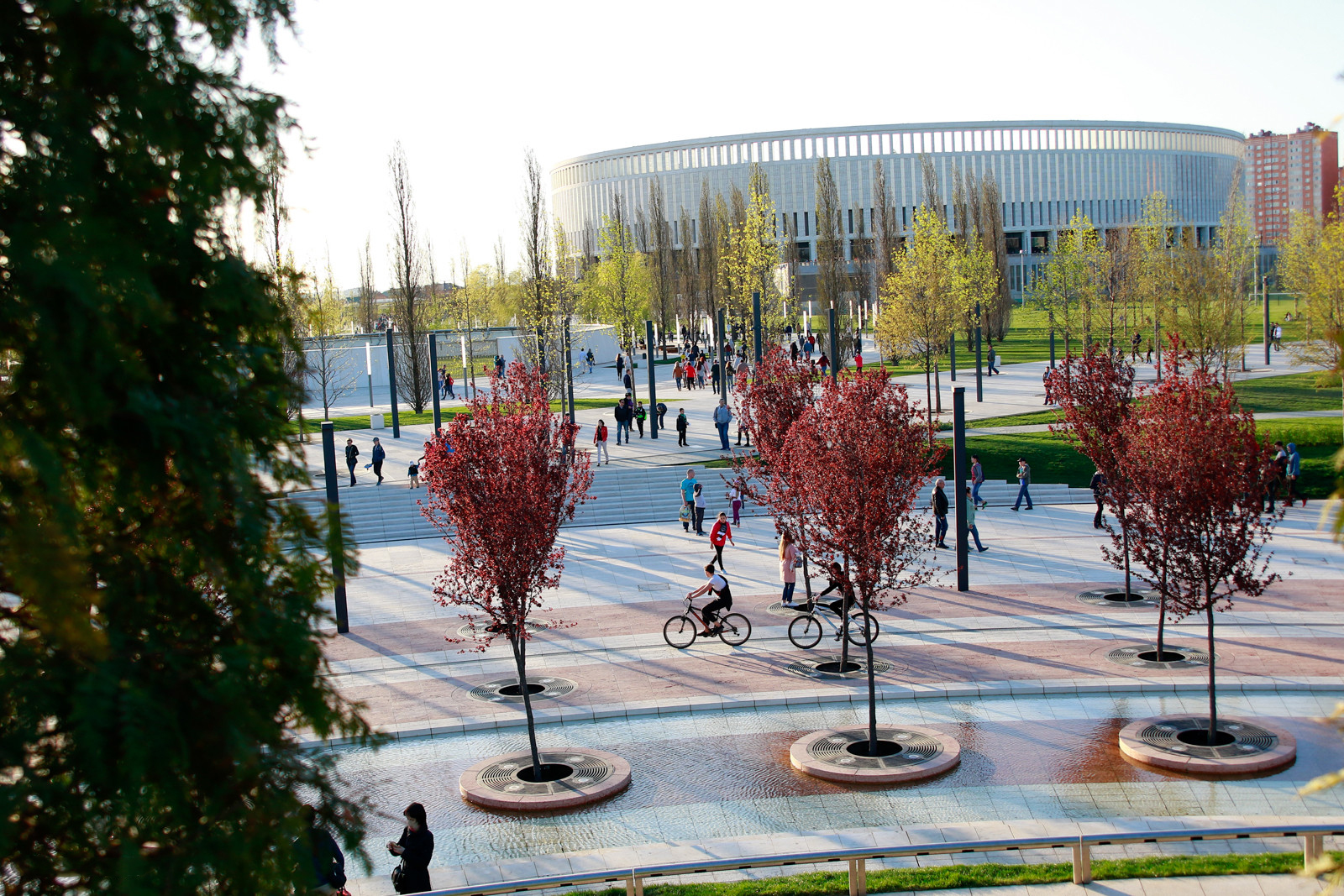

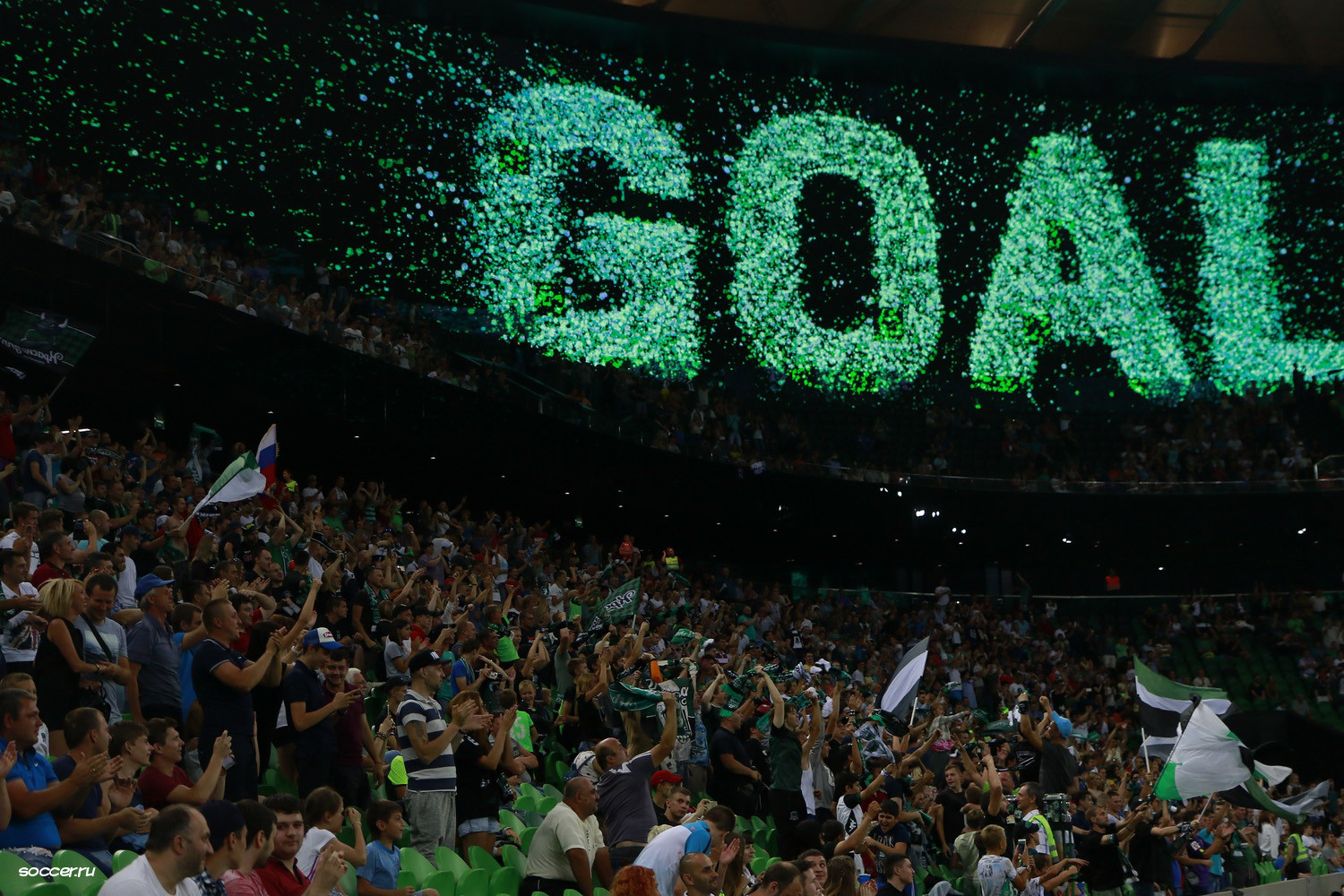

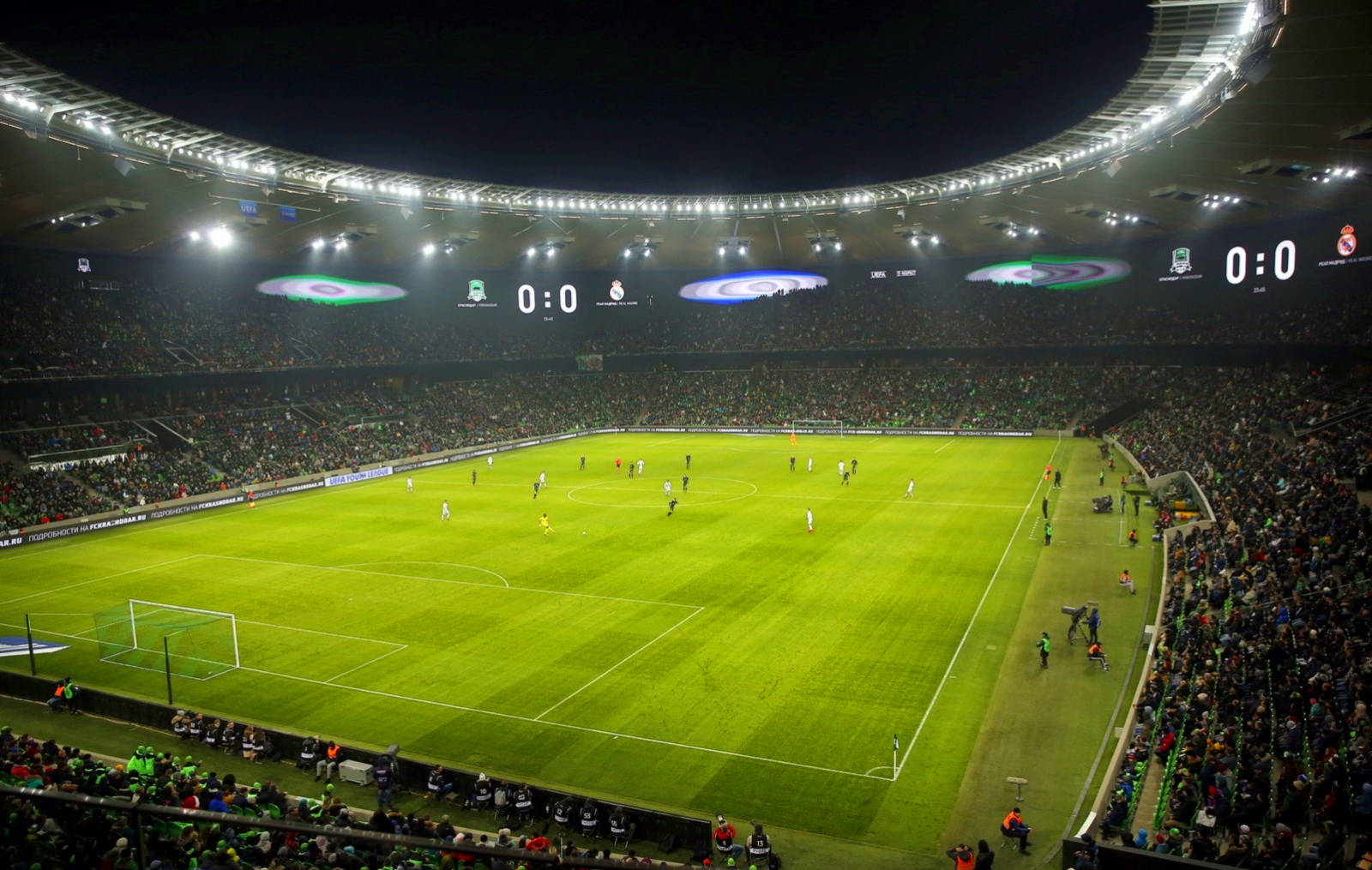

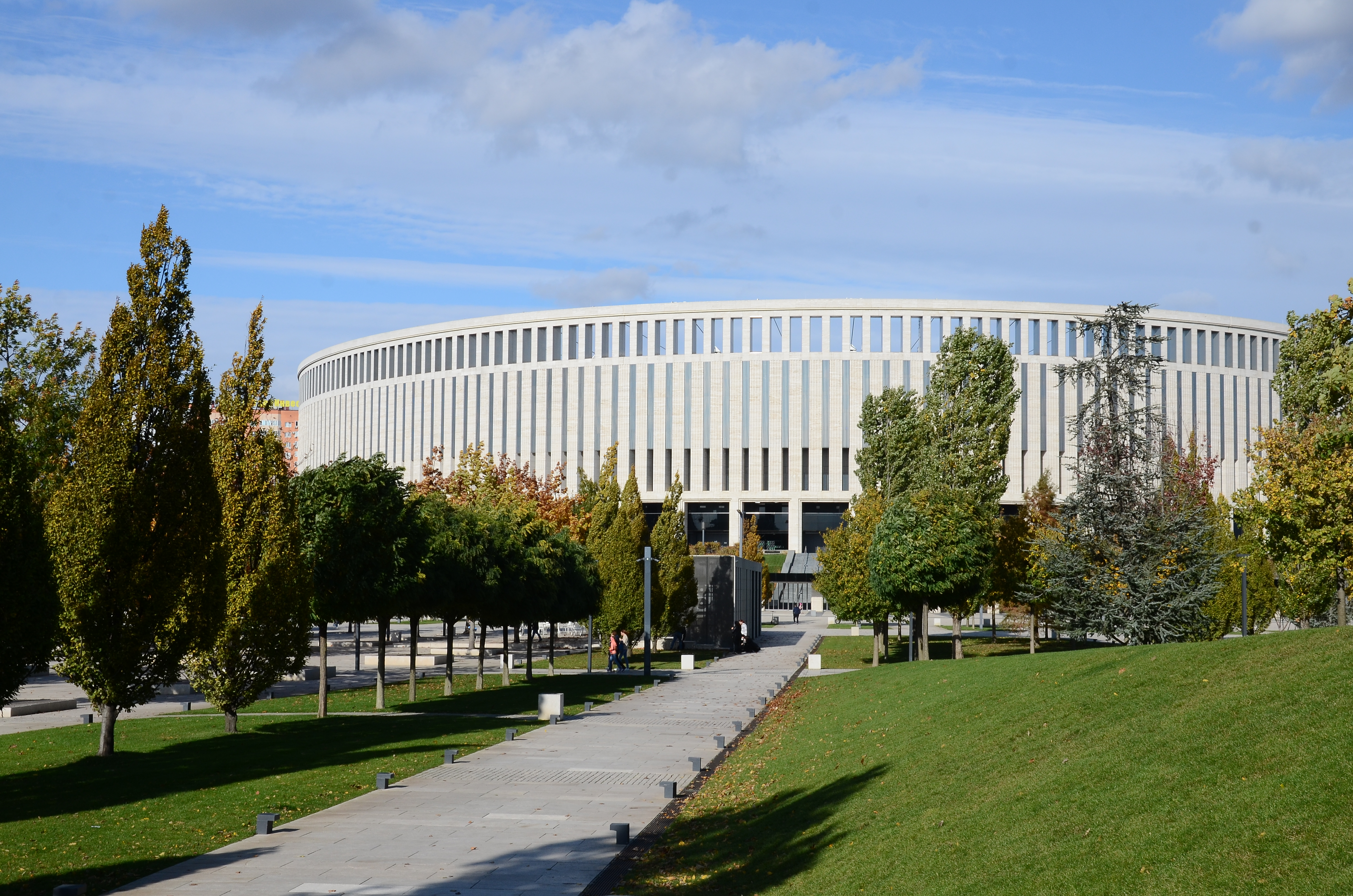

== See also ==
- List of football stadiums in Russia
- Lists of stadiums
