= Ivan Khleborodov =

Russian footballer

Personal information
- Full name: Ivan Vyacheslavovich Khleborodov
- Date of birth: 13 October 1995 (age 31)
- Place of birth: Irkutsk, Russia
- Height: 1.87 m (6 ft 2 in)
- Position: Forward

Team information
- Current team: Long An
- Number: 9

Senior career*
Years	Team	Apps	(Gls)
2013–2015	Baikal Irkutsk	5	(0)
2016–2017	Zenit Irkutsk	20	(4)
2017–2019	Luch Vladivostok	63	(7)
2019	Fakel Voronezh	17	(0)
2020	Volgar Astrakhan	1	(0)
2020–2021	Sokol Saratov	28	(12)
2021–2022	Saransk	26	(9)
2022–2023	Kaluga	31	(17)
2023–2025	Ufa	15	(1)
2024–2025	→ Kaluga (loan)	32	(3)
2025–	Long An	6	(0)
- * Club domestic league appearances and goals as of 9 November 2025

Ivan Vyacheslavovich Khleborodov (Russian: Иван Вячеславович Хлебородов; born 13 October 1995) is a Russian professional footballer who plays as forward for V.League 2 club Long An.

== Club career ==
He made his debut in the Russian Second Division for Baikal Irkutsk on 3 August 2013 in a game against Sibir-2 Novosibirsk.

He made his Russian Football National League debut for Luch-Energiya Vladivostok on 8 July 2017 in a game against Krylia Sovetov Samara.

In September 2025, Khleborodov moved to Vietnam, signing for V.League 2 club Long An.
