= Dmitry Chernukhin =

Russian professional footballer

Personal information
- Full name: Dmitry Sergeyevich Chernukhin
- Date of birth: 17 November 1988 (age 37)
- Place of birth: Moscow, Russian SFSR
- Height: 1.78 m (5 ft 10 in)
- Position: Midfielder

Team information
- Current team: FC Shumbrat Saransk (manager)

Senior career*
Years	Team	Apps	(Gls)
2009–2010	FC Sportakademklub Moscow	63	(4)
2011–2012	FC Volga Tver	43	(1)
2012–2013	FC Zvezda Ryazan	26	(1)
2013–2015	FC Tosno	34	(1)
2014–2015	→ FC Dynamo Saint Petersburg (loan)	17	(2)
2016	JK Narva Trans	20	(1)
2017–2018	FC Luki-Energiya Velikiye Luki	26	(3)
2018–2021	FC Torpedo Vladimir	63	(12)
2021–2022	FC Zenit Penza	2	(0)

Managerial career
- 2023: FC Rodina Moscow (U16 assistant)
- 2024: FC Rodina Moscow (U16)
- 2024–2025: FC Rodina Moscow (U16 assistant)
- 2025–2026: FC Cherepovets
- 2026–: FC Shumbrat Saransk
- * Club domestic league appearances and goals

Dmitry Sergeyevich Chernukhin (Russian: Дми́трий Серге́евич Черну́хин; born 17 November 1988) is a Russian professional football coach and a former player. He is the manager of FC Shumbrat Saransk.

== Club career ==
He made his Russian Football National League debut for FC Tosno on 6 July 2014 in a game against FC Gazovik Orenburg.
