= Kirill Karpov =

Russian footballer

Personal information
- Full name: Kirill Anatolyevich Karpov
- Date of birth: 28 February 1997 (age 29)
- Place of birth: Koryazhma, Arkhangelsk Oblast, Russia
- Height: 1.90 m (6 ft 3 in)
- Position: Centre-back

Team information
- Current team: Shumbrat Saransk
- Number: 33

Youth career
- 2015–2018: Shinnik Yaroslavl

Senior career*
Years	Team	Apps	(Gls)
2017–2018	Shinnik Yaroslavl	1	(0)
2019	Orsha	12	(1)
2019	Volga Ulyanovsk	0	(0)
2020–2021	Lida	31	(0)
2021–2022	Yevpatoriya	8	(0)
2022	Lida	21	(3)
2023	Molodechno	0	(0)
2023	Khimik Koryazhma (amateur)		
2024–2025	Shumbrat Saransk (amateur)		
2026–	Shumbrat Saransk	26	(6)
- * Club domestic league appearances and goals as of 31 October 2026

Kirill Anatolyevich Karpov (Russian: Кирилл Анатольевич Карпов; born 28 February 1997) is a Russian football player who plays for Shumbrat Saransk.

== Club career ==
He made his debut in the Russian Football National League for Shinnik Yaroslavl on 15 April 2018 in a game against Orenburg.
