= Dmitri Sysuyev =

Russian footballer

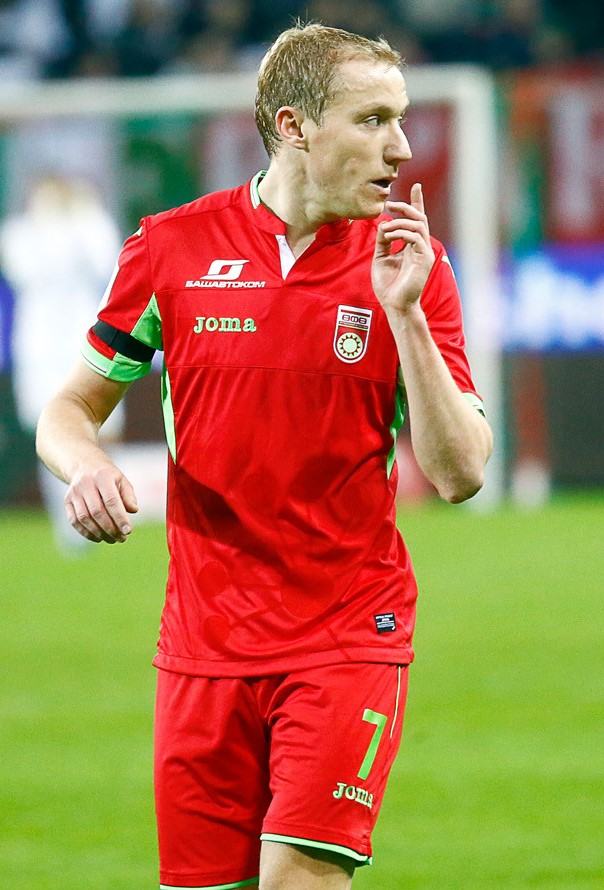
- Sysuyev with Ufa in 2017

Personal information
- Full name: Dmitri Mikhaylovich Sysuyev
- Date of birth: 13 January 1988 (age 38)
- Place of birth: Saransk, Russia
- Height: 1.76 m (5 ft 9 in)
- Positions: Forward; midfielder

Team information
- Current team: Shumbrat Saransk
- Number: 8

Senior career*
Years	Team	Apps	(Gls)
2005–2007	Mordovia Saransk	82	(19)
2008	Torpedo Moscow	29	(3)
2009–2010	Mordovia Saransk	65	(19)
2011	Sibir Novosibirsk	12	(0)
2011–2014	Baltika Kaliningrad	79	(14)
2014–2015	Mordovia Saransk	19	(0)
2016–2021	Ufa	99	(10)
2021–2022	Saransk	14	(2)
2022–2024	Murom	56	(9)
2024–2025	Shumbrat Saransk (amateur)		
2026–	Shumbrat Saransk	9	(2)
- * Club domestic league appearances and goals as of 31 October 2026

Dmitri Mikhaylovich Sysuyev (Russian: Дмитрий Михайлович Сысуев; born 13 January 1988) is a Russian professional football player who plays as an attacking midfielder or striker for Shumbrat Saransk.

== Personal life ==
His younger brother Vladislav Sysuyev is also a footballer.

== Career statistics ==
=== Club ===
As of match played on 13 May 2018

Club	Season	League			Cup		Continental		Total	
Club	Season	Division	Apps	Goals	Apps	Goals	Apps	Goals	Apps	Goals
Mordovia Saransk	2005	PFL	20	6	1	0	–		21	6
Mordovia Saransk	2006	PFL	26	8	5	1	–		31	9
Mordovia Saransk	2007	FNL	36	5	1	0	–		37	5
Torpedo Moscow	2008	FNL	29	3	0	0	–		29	3
Mordovia Saransk	2009	PFL	28	14	5	4	–		33	18
Mordovia Saransk	2010	FNL	37	5	3	0	–		40	5
Sibir Novosibirsk	2011–12	FNL	12	0	0	0	–		12	0
Baltika Kaliningrad	2011–12	FNL	25	1	–		–		25	1
Baltika Kaliningrad	2012–13	FNL	27	9	1	0	–		28	9
Baltika Kaliningrad	2013–14	FNL	27	4	0	0	–		27	4
Baltika Kaliningrad	Total		79	14	1	0	0	0	80	14
Mordovia Saransk	2014–15	Russian Premier League	10	0	2	1	–		12	1
Mordovia Saransk	2015–16	Russian Premier League	9	0	0	0	–		9	0
Mordovia Saransk	Total (3 spells)		166	38	17	6	0	0	183	44
Ufa	2015–16	Russian Premier League	11	2	0	0	–		11	2
Ufa	2016–17	Russian Premier League	16	1	4	0	–		20	1
Ufa	2017–18	Russian Premier League	26	5	1	0	–		27	5
Ufa	Total		53	8	5	0	0	0	58	8
Career total			339	63	23	6	0	0	362	69
