= Maksim Terentyev =

Russian footballer

Personal information
- Full name: Maksim Fyodorovich Terentyev
- Date of birth: 9 August 1992 (age 34)
- Place of birth: Saransk, Russia
- Height: 1.78 m (5 ft 10 in)
- Position: Midfielder

Team information
- Current team: Shumbrat Saransk
- Number: 37

Youth career
- Mordovia Saransk

Senior career*
Years	Team	Apps	(Gls)
2012–2014	Mordovia Saransk	14	(0)
2014	TSK Simferopol	5	(1)
2015–2016	Dnepr Smolensk	20	(0)
2016	Daugavpils	0	(0)
2017	Kafa Feodosia	21	(0)
2017	Saransk (amateur)		
2018–2020	KEMZ-Spartak Kovylkino		
2020–2022	MTsPUFP Mordovia Saransk		
2024–2025	Shumbrat Saransk (amateur)		
2026–	Shumbrat Saransk	12	(0)
- * Club domestic league appearances and goals as of 31 October 2026

Maksim Fyodorovich Terentyev (Russian: Максим Фёдорович Терентьев; born 9 August 1992) is a Russian professional football player who plays for Shumbrat Saransk.

== Club career ==
He made his debut in the Russian Premier League on 10 November 2012 for Mordovia Saransk in a game against Terek Grozny.
