= Alexey Shebanov =

Russian footballer

Personal information
- Full name: Alexey Olegovich Shebanov
- Date of birth: 1 June 1993 (age 33)
- Place of birth: Surskoye, Russia
- Height: 1.76 m (5 ft 9 in)
- Position: Midfielder

Youth career
- FC Mordovia Saransk

Senior career*
Years	Team	Apps	(Gls)
2009	FC Mordovia-2 Saransk		
2010	FC Mordovia Saransk	1	(0)
2011–2012	FC Mordovia Saransk	0	(0)
2013–2014	FC Zvezda Ryazan	35	(2)
2014–2015	FC Saturn Ramenskoye	26	(0)
2015–2016	FC Khimik Dzerzhinsk	19	(3)
2016	BFC Daugavpils	13	(2)
2017	FC Zenit-Izhevsk	6	(1)
2017	FC Afips Afipsky	10	(0)
2018–2019	FC Dynamo Stavropol	20	(1)
2020	FC Sevastopol		
2020–2021	FC Dynamo Bryansk	5	(0)
2021–2022	FC Saransk	18	(0)

International career
2010	Russia U-17	4	(1)
- * Club domestic league appearances and goals

Alexey Olegovich Shebanov (Russian: Алексе́й Оле́гович Шеба́нов; born 1 June 1993) is a Russian former professional association football player.

== Club career ==
He made his Russian Football National League debut for FC Mordovia Saransk on 14 October 2010 in a game against FC SKA-Energiya Khabarovsk.

== Personal life ==
His older brother Denis Shebanov is also a professional footballer.
