= Aleksandr Yermakov =

Russian footballer

Personal information
- Full name: Aleksandr Aleksandrovich Yermakov
- Date of birth: 18 July 2001 (age 25)
- Place of birth: Torbeyevo, Russia
- Height: 1.75 m (5 ft 9 in)
- Position: Forward

Team information
- Current team: Shumbrat Saransk
- Number: 18

Youth career
- Mordovia Saransk

Senior career*
| Years | Team | Apps | (Gls) |
| 2017 | Agrofirma Oktyabrskaya Bolshaya Yelkhovka | | |
| 2017–2020 | Mordovia Saransk | 30 | (1) |
| 2020–2021 | Sokol Saratov | 24 | (0) |
| 2021–2022 | Saransk | 31 | (7) |
| 2022–2023 | Novosibirsk | 8 | (0) |
| 2023 | Khimik Dzerzhinsk | 7 | (0) |
| 2023 | Zenit Penza | 16 | (4) |
| 2024–2025 | Ural-2 Yekaterinburg | 24 | (2) |
| 2026– | Shumbrat Saransk | 25 | (2) |
- * Club domestic league appearances and goals as of 31 October 2026

Aleksandr Aleksandrovich Yermakov (Russian: Александр Александрович Ермаков; born 18 July 2001) is a Russian football player who plays for Shumbrat Saransk.

== Club career ==
He made his debut in the Russian Professional Football League for Mordovia Saransk on 27 May 2018 in a game against Ural-2 Yekaterinburg. He made his Russian Football National League debut for Mordovia on 3 March 2019 in a game against Tambov.
