= Alan Khabalov =

Russian footballer

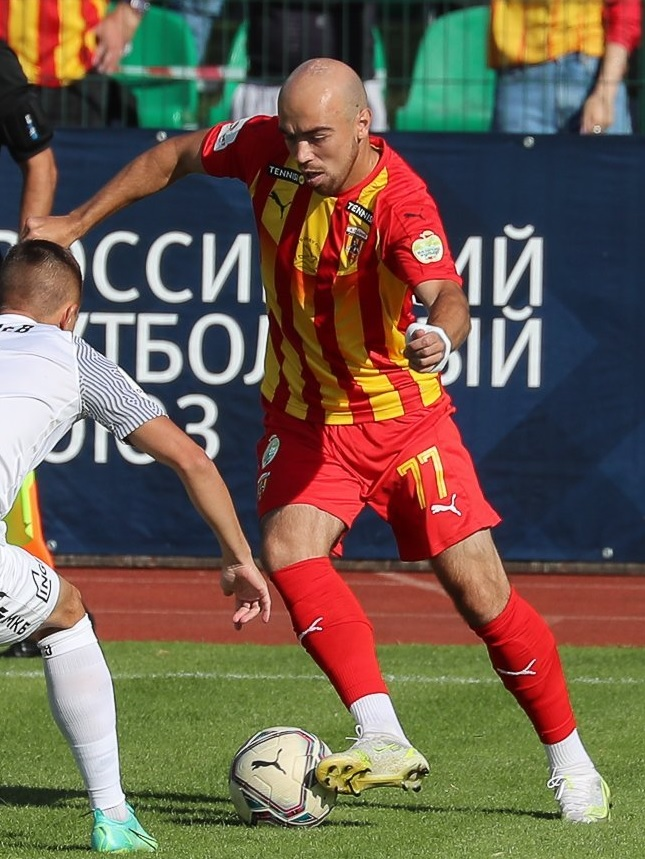
- Khabalov with Alania in 2021

Personal information
- Full name: Alan Ruslanovich Khabalov
- Date of birth: 27 May 1995 (age 31)
- Place of birth: Vladikavkaz, Russia
- Height: 1.80 m (5 ft 11 in)
- Position: Midfielder

Team information
- Current team: FC Ufa
- Number: 15

Senior career*
Years	Team	Apps	(Gls)
2012–2013	FC Alania Vladikavkaz	0	(0)
2013–2014	FC Alania-d Vladikavkaz	29	(3)
2014	FC Volga Tver	15	(2)
2015	Farense	10	(0)
2015	→ Tirsense (loan)	4	(0)
2016	FC Khimki	8	(0)
2016–2018	FC Dnepr Smolensk	62	(4)
2019	FC Mashuk-KMV Pyatigorsk	8	(3)
2019–2024	FC Alania Vladikavkaz	143	(17)
2024–2025	FC Chernomorets Novorossiysk	12	(1)
2025–	FC Ufa	26	(1)
- * Club domestic league appearances and goals as of 16 May 2026

Alan Ruslanovich Khabalov (Russian: Алан Русланович Хабалов; born 27 May 1995) is a Russian football midfielder who plays for FC Ufa.

== Club career ==
He made his debut in the Russian Second Division for FC Alania-d Vladikavkaz on 12 July 2013 in a game against FC Gazprom transgaz Stavropol Ryzdvyany.
