= Vladislav Sysuyev =

Russian footballer

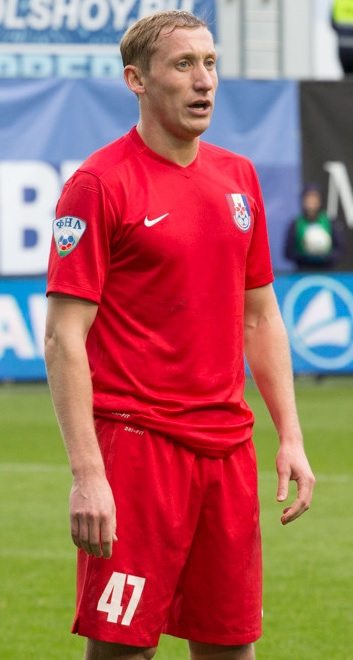
- Sysuyev with Mordovia in 2017

Personal information
- Full name: Vladislav Mikhailovich Sysuyev
- Date of birth: 12 April 1989 (age 37)
- Place of birth: Saransk, Russian SFSR
- Height: 1.79 m (5 ft 10 in)
- Position: Midfielder

Youth career
- FC Mordovia Saransk

Senior career*
Years	Team	Apps	(Gls)
2006–2008	FC Mordovia Saransk	49	(0)
2009	FC Mordovia-2 Saransk		
2010	FC Svetoservis Kadoshkino		
2011–2013	FC Spartak Kostroma	56	(4)
2013	FC Baltika Kaliningrad	1	(0)
2014–2016	FC Kaluga	54	(10)
2016–2017	FC Mordovia Saransk	12	(1)
2016	→ FC Chayka Peschanokopskoye (loan)	11	(0)
2017–2018	FC Rotor Volgograd	30	(2)
2018–2019	FC Urozhay Krasnodar	23	(5)
2019	FC Inter Cherkessk	13	(1)
2020–2021	FC Tekstilshchik Ivanovo	26	(4)
2021–2022	FC Saransk	24	(1)
2022–2023	FC Murom	12	(0)
- * Club domestic league appearances and goals

Vladislav Mikhailovich Sysuyev (Russian: Владислав Михайлович Сысуев; born 12 April 1989) is a Russian former professional football player.

== Club career ==
He made his Russian Football National League debut for FC Mordovia Saransk on 28 March 2007 in a game against FC Ural Yekaterinburg.

== Personal life ==
His older brother Dmitri Sysuyev is also a footballer.
