= Andrey Okladnikov =

Russian footballer

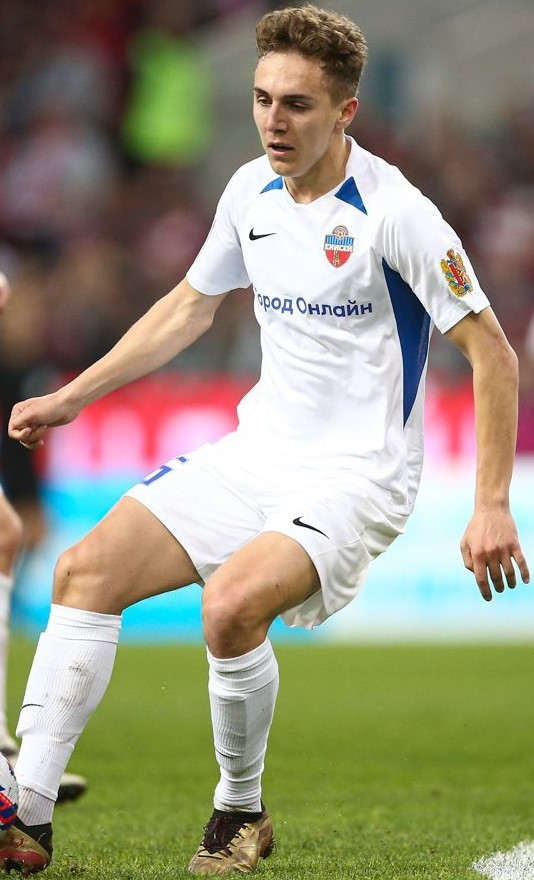
- Okladnikov with Yenisey in 2022

Personal information
- Full name: Andrey Yevgenyevich Okladnikov
- Date of birth: 13 June 1999 (age 27)
- Place of birth: Kansk, Russia
- Height: 1.84 m (6 ft 0 in)
- Position: Forward

Team information
- Current team: Yenisey Krasnoyarsk
- Number: 75

Senior career*
Years	Team	Apps	(Gls)
2018–2019	Rassvet Krasnoyarsk		
2021–2022	Yenisey-2 Krasnoyarsk	16	(6)
2021–2024	Yenisey Krasnoyarsk	83	(21)
2024–2025	Chernomorets Novorossiysk	9	(1)
2024–2025	→ Yenisey Krasnoyarsk (loan)	23	(4)
2025–	Yenisey Krasnoyarsk	30	(11)
- * Club domestic league appearances and goals as of 16 May 2026

Andrey Yevgenyevich Okladnikov (Russian: Андрей Евгеньевич Окладников; born 13 June 1999) is a Russian football player who plays for Yenisey Krasnoyarsk.

== Club career ==
He made his debut in the Russian Football National League for Yenisey Krasnoyarsk on 9 October 2021 in a game against Rotor Volgograd.
