= Khetag Kochiyev =

Russian footballer (born 1999)

Personal information
- Full name: Khetag Feliksovich Kochiyev
- Date of birth: 18 December 1999 (age 26)
- Place of birth: Vladikavkaz, Russia
- Height: 1.87 m (6 ft 1 1/2 in)
- Position: Defender

Team information
- Current team: Chelyabinsk
- Number: 15

Senior career*
Years	Team	Apps	(Gls)
2016	FC Khimki-M (amateur)		
2017	FC Strogino-M Moscow		
2017–2019	Spartak Vladikavkaz	12	(0)
2019–2023	Alania Vladikavkaz	104	(5)
2023–2025	Pafos	0	(0)
2023–2025	→ Rodina Moscow (loan)	26	(0)
2023–2025	→ Rodina-2 Moscow (loan)	27	(0)
2025–	Chelyabinsk	30	(2)
- * Club domestic league appearances and goals as of 16 May 2026

Khetag Feliksovich Kochiyev (Russian: Хетаг Феликсович Кочиев; born 18 December 1999) is a Russian football player who plays as a defender for Chelyabinsk.

== Club career ==
He made his debut in the Russian Football National League for FC Alania Vladikavkaz on 1 August 2020 in a game against FC SKA-Khabarovsk, as a starter.

== Career statistics ==
=== Club ===
As of 20 September 2020

Club	Season	League			Cup		Continental		Other		Total	
Club	Season	Division	Apps	Goals	Apps	Goals	Apps	Goals	Apps	Goals	Apps	Goals
FC Alania Vladikavkaz	2019–20	PFL	11	0	2	0	—		—		13	0
FC Alania Vladikavkaz	2020–21	FNL	38	3	1	0	—		0	0	39	3
FC Alania Vladikavkaz	Total		49	3	3	0	0	0	0	0	52	3
Career total			49	3	3	0	0	0	0	0	52	3
