= Vladislav Ignatenko =

Russian football player

Personal information
- Full name: Vladislav Igorevich Ignatenko
- Date of birth: 2 January 1998 (age 28)
- Place of birth: Kirovsk, Luhansk Oblast, Ukraine
- Height: 1.72 m (5 ft 8 in)
- Position: Midfielder

Team information
- Current team: FC Amkar Perm
- Number: 11

Youth career
- –2017: FC Metalist Kharkiv
- 2017: Zemplín Michalovce

Senior career*
Years	Team	Apps	(Gls)
2017–2019	FC Lokomotiv Moscow	0	(0)
2017–2019	→ FC Kazanka Moscow	11	(1)
2019–2020	FC Nosta Novotroitsk	11	(4)
2020	FC KAMAZ Naberezhnye Chelny	0	(0)
2020–2021	FC Nosta Novotroitsk	12	(6)
2021	FC Shinnik Yaroslavl	16	(1)
2021	FC Nosta Novotroitsk	6	(2)
2021–2022	FC KAMAZ Naberezhnye Chelny	24	(0)
2022–2024	FC Avangard Kursk	83	(17)
2024–2025	MFL		
2025–2026	FC Avangard Kursk	14	(4)
2026	FC Murom	13	(0)
2026–	FC Amkar Perm	12	(4)
- * Club domestic league appearances and goals as of 17 October 2026

Vladislav Igorevich Ignatenko (Russian: Владислав Игоревич Игнатенко; born 2 January 1998) is a Russian football player who plays for FC Amkar Perm. He was born and raised in Ukraine as Vladyslav Ihorovych Ihnatenko (Ukrainian: Владислав Ігорович Ігнатенко). Vladislav acquired Russian citizenship in 2016.

== Club career ==
He made his debut in the Russian Football National League for FC Shinnik Yaroslavl on 27 February 2021 in a game against FC Chayka Peschanokopskoye.
