= Denis Shepilov =

Russian footballer

Personal information
- Full name: Denis Alekseyevich Shepilov
- Date of birth: 17 November 2000 (age 25)
- Place of birth: Voronezh, Russia
- Height: 1.84 m (6 ft 0 in)
- Position: Midfielder

Senior career*
Years	Team	Apps	(Gls)
2020–2022	FC Fakel-M Voronezh	18	(3)
2020–2023	FC Fakel Voronezh	36	(0)
- * Club domestic league appearances and goals as of 8 October 2023

Denis Alekseyevich Shepilov (Russian: Денис Алексеевич Шепилов; born 17 November 2000) is a Russian football player.

== Club career ==
He made his debut in the Russian Football National League for FC Fakel Voronezh on 28 October 2020 in a game against FC Volgar Astrakhan.

== Career statistics ==
As of 27 November 2022

Club	Season	League			Cup		Continental		Total	
Club	Season	Division	Apps	Goals	Apps	Goals	Apps	Goals	Apps	Goals
Fakel-M Voronezh	2020–21	Second League	12	3	–		–		12	3
Fakel-M Voronezh	2021–22	Second League	6	0	–		–		6	0
Fakel-M Voronezh	Total		18	3	0	0	0	0	18	3
Fakel Voronezh	2020–21	First League	12	0	0	0	–		12	0
Fakel Voronezh	2021–22	First League	24	0	3	1	–		27	1
Fakel Voronezh	2022–23	RPL	0	0	0	0	–		0	0
Fakel Voronezh	Total		36	0	3	1	0	0	39	1
Career total			54	3	3	1	0	0	57	4
