= Aleksandr Maslovsky =

Russian footballer

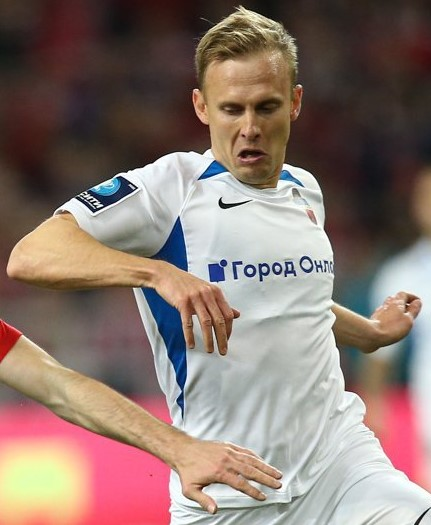
- Maslovsky with Yenisey in 2022

Personal information
- Full name: Aleksandr Aleksandrovich Maslovsky
- Date of birth: 3 January 1992 (age 34)
- Place of birth: Krasnoyarsk, Russia
- Height: 1.80 m (5 ft 11 in)
- Positions: Defender; midfielder

Team information
- Current team: FC Yenisey Krasnoyarsk
- Number: 33

Senior career*
Years	Team	Apps	(Gls)
2010	FC Sibir Novosibirsk	0	(0)
2013–2015	FC Yenisey Krasnoyarsk	7	(0)
2013	→ FC Irtysh Omsk (loan)	13	(3)
2014–2015	→ FC Irtysh Omsk (loan)	24	(2)
2016–2018	FC Chita	48	(0)
2018–2020	FC Irtysh Omsk	50	(6)
2021	FC Orenburg	4	(0)
2021–	FC Yenisey Krasnoyarsk	158	(9)
- * Club domestic league appearances and goals as of 16 May 2026

Aleksandr Aleksandrovich Maslovsky (Russian: Александр Александрович Масловский; born 3 January 1992) is a Russian football player who plays for FC Yenisey Krasnoyarsk.

== Club career ==
He made his debut in the Russian Football National League for FC Yenisey Krasnoyarsk on 19 May 2013 in a game against FC Neftekhimik Nizhnekamsk.
