= Maksim Lauk =

Russian footballer

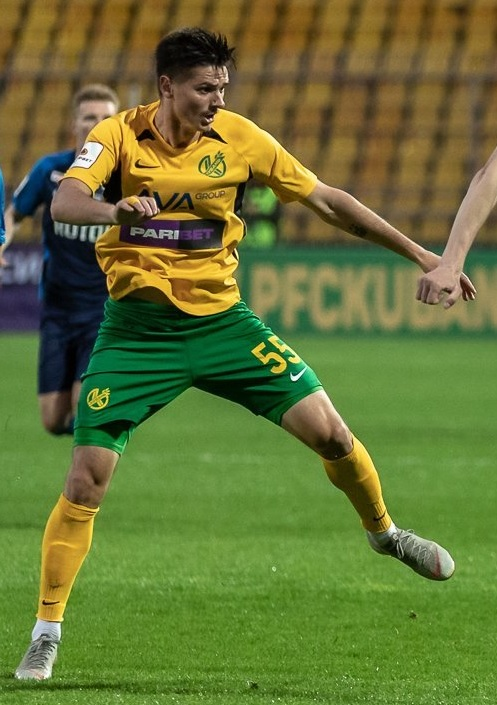
- Lauk with Kuban Krasnodar in 2022

Personal information
- Full name: Maksim Vyacheslavovich Lauk
- Date of birth: 22 January 1995 (age 31)
- Place of birth: Omsk, Russia
- Height: 1.82 m (6 ft 0 in)
- Position: Midfielder

Team information
- Current team: FC Dynamo Kirov
- Number: 10

Youth career
- –2009: Dynamo-Yunior Omsk
- 2009–2010: FC Irtysh Omsk
- 2011: Football SDYuSShOR Perm
- 2011–2013: FC Amkar Perm
- 2013: FC Syzran-2003-d Syzran

Senior career*
Years	Team	Apps	(Gls)
2014–2015	FC Kuban Krasnodar	0	(0)
2015–2016	FC Dynamo Kirov	24	(6)
2016–2017	FC Shinnik Yaroslavl	45	(3)
2018	FC Tyumen	30	(4)
2019	FC Armavir	7	(0)
2019–2021	FC Zvezda Perm	34	(17)
2021	FC Yenisey Krasnoyarsk	7	(0)
2021–2024	FC Kuban Krasnodar	65	(10)
2024	FC KAMAZ Naberezhnye Chelny	5	(0)
2024	FC Shinnik Yaroslavl	5	(0)
2024–2025	FC KAMAZ Naberezhnye Chelny	17	(0)
2025–2026	FC Uralets-TS Nizhny Tagil	11	(2)
2026–	FC Dynamo Kirov	26	(10)
- * Club domestic league appearances and goals as of 15 November 2026

Maksim Vyacheslavovich Lauk (Russian: Максим Вячеславович Лаук; born 22 January 1995) is a Russian football player of German descent who plays for FC Dynamo Kirov.

== Club career ==
He made his debut in the Russian Professional Football League for FC Dynamo Kirov on 20 July 2015 in a game against FC Syzran-2003.

He made his Russian Football National League debut for FC Shinnik Yaroslavl on 11 July 2016 in a game against FC Baltika Kaliningrad.
