= Ilnur Alshin =

Russian professional football player

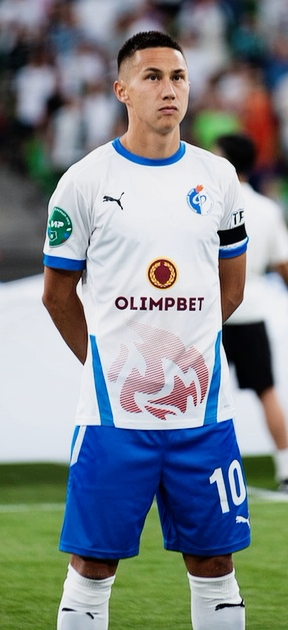
- Alshin with Fakel in 2022

Personal information
- Full name: Ilnur Tufikovich Alshin
- Date of birth: 31 August 1993 (age 33)
- Place of birth: Tyumen, Russia
- Height: 1.74 m (5 ft 9 in)
- Position: Left winger

Team information
- Current team: FC Fakel Voronezh
- Number: 10

Youth career
- 2001–2009: SDYuShOR Geolog Tyumen
- 2009–2011: Nara-ShBFR Naro-Fominsk
- 2011–2013: Spartak Moscow

Senior career*
Years	Team	Apps	(Gls)
2010	Nara-ShBFR Naro-Fominsk	16	(0)
2013–2016	Fakel Voronezh	91	(13)
2017–2018	Tosno	12	(2)
2017–2018	→ Avangard Kursk (loan)	28	(7)
2018	Avangard Kursk	22	(2)
2019	Tambov	9	(0)
2019–2022	Baltika Kaliningrad	97	(14)
2022–	Fakel Voronezh	120	(4)

International career
2010	Russia U-17	7	(1)
2011	Russia U-18	5	(2)
- * Club domestic league appearances and goals as of 31 October 2026

Ilnur Tufikovich Alshin (Russian: Ильнур Туфикович Альшин; born 31 August 1993) is a Russian professional football player who plays as a winger (on left or right) for Fakel Voronezh.

== Club career ==
He made his Russian Premier League debut for Tosno on 22 July 2017 in a game against Krasnodar.

He played in the 2017–18 Russian Cup final for Avangard Kursk on 9 May 2018 in the Volgograd Arena against the 2–1 winners, his parent club Tosno.

On 29 June 2022, Alshin returned to Fakel Voronezh.

== Career statistics ==
As of match played 31 October 2026

Appearances and goals by club, season and competition
Club	Season	League			Cup		Other		Total	
Club	Season	Division	Apps	Goals	Apps	Goals	Apps	Goals	Apps	Goals
Nara-ShBFR Naro-Fominsk	2010	Russian Second League	16	0	0	0	—		16	0
Fakel Voronezh	2013–14	Russian Second League	14	2	1	0	—		15	2
Fakel Voronezh	2014–15	Russian Second League	24	5	4	1	—		28	6
Fakel Voronezh	2015–16	Russian First League	29	6	1	0	4 (Note: Appearances in FNL Cup)	1	34	7
Fakel Voronezh	2016–17	Russian First League	24	0	2	0	—		26	0
Tosno	2016–17	Russian First League	11	2	1	0	—		12	2
Tosno	2017–18	Russian Premier League	1	0	—		—		1	0
Tosno	Total		12	2	1	0	0	0	13	2
Avangard Kursk	2017–18	Russian First League	28	7	6	0	—		34	7
Avangard Kursk	2018–19	Russian First League	22	2	2	0	—		24	2
Avangard Kursk	Total		50	9	8	0	0	0	58	9
Tambov	2018–19	Russian First League	9	0	—		5	0	14	0
Baltika Kaliningrad	2019–20	Russian First League	25	4	3	0	—		28	4
Baltika Kaliningrad	2020–21	Russian First League	38	6	1	0	—		39	6
Baltika Kaliningrad	2021–22	Russian First League	34	4	4	1	—		38	5
Baltika Kaliningrad	Total		97	14	8	1	0	0	105	15
Fakel Voronezh	2022–23	Russian Premier League	23	1	2	0	2 (Note: Appearances in relegation play-offs)	0	27	1
Fakel Voronezh	2023–24	Russian Premier League	29	1	3	0	—		32	1
Fakel Voronezh	2024–25	Russian Premier League	27	2	1	0	—		28	2
Fakel Voronezh	2025–26	Russian First League	31	0	3	0	—		34	0
Fakel Voronezh	2026–27	Russian Premier League	10	0	3	1	—		13	1
Fakel Voronezh	Total		120	4	12	1	2	0	134	5
Career total			395	42	37	3	11	1	443	46
