= David Shavlokhov =

Russian footballer

Personal information
- Full name: David Feliksovich Shavlokhov
- Date of birth: 24 February 1998 (age 28)
- Height: 1.84 m (6 ft 0 in)
- Position: Defender

Team information
- Current team: FC Alania Vladikavkaz
- Number: 30

Senior career*
Years	Team	Apps	(Gls)
2018–2019	FC Yessentuki (amateur)		
2019	FC Spartak Vladikavkaz	3	(0)
2019–2024	FC Alania Vladikavkaz	95	(6)
2024–2025	FC Tyumen	32	(3)
2025–2026	FC SKA-Khabarovsk	27	(0)
2026–	FC Alania Vladikavkaz	10	(0)
- * Club domestic league appearances and goals as of 15 November 2026

David Feliksovich Shavlokhov (Russian: Давид Феликсович Шавлохов; born 24 February 1998) is a Russian football player who plays for FC Alania Vladikavkaz.

== Club career ==
He made his debut in the Russian Football National League for FC Alania Vladikavkaz on 1 August 2020 in a game against FC SKA-Khabarovsk, as a starter.
