= FC Shumbrat Saransk =

Shumbrat Saransk
- Full name: Football Club Shumbrat Saransk
- Founded: 2024
- Ground: Start Stadium
- Capacity: 11,613
- Manager: Dmitry Chernukhin
- League: Russian Second League; Division B Group 3
- 2026: 8th
- Website: vk.com/fc_shumbrat

FC Shumbrat Saransk (Russian: ФК «Шумбрат» Саранск) is a Russian football club based in Saransk.

== Club history ==
Shumbrat was founded and started playing in the Russian Amateur Football League in 2024. For the 2026 season, Shumbrat was licensed for the fourth-tier Russian Second League Division B. It was assigned to Group 3.

== Current squad ==
As of 13 September 2026

Note: Flags indicate national team as defined under FIFA eligibility rules; some limited exceptions apply. Players may hold more than one non-FIFA nationality.

No.	Pos.	Nation	Player
1	GK	RUS	Kirill Grigoryev
4	DF	RUS	Timur Khamidullin
6	MF	RUS	Vitaly Trofimov
7	MF	RUS	Vladislav Polyakov
8	FW	RUS	Dmitri Sysuyev
10	FW	RUS	Stanislav Basyrov
11	DF	RUS	Radik Yusupov
12	MF	RUS	Vladislav Saygushev
15	DF	RUS	Gleb Gridin
16	GK	RUS	Aleksandr Leshchakov
17	MF	RUS	Aysa Abdullov
18	MF	RUS	Aleksandr Yermakov
19	MF	RUS	Kirill Belyayev
20	FW	RUS	Dmitry Abrosimov
21	MF	RUS	Vladislav Abramov
22	FW	RUS	Artyom Lomukhin

No.	Pos.	Nation	Player
23	MF	RUS	Aziz Gaziyev
27	DF	RUS	Artyom Molodtsov
31	DF	RUS	Vyacheslav Verushkin
32	DF	RUS	Dmitri Osipov
33	DF	RUS	Kirill Karpov
34	MF	RUS	Konstantin Garanin
35	GK	RUS	Maksim Aysin
37	MF	RUS	Maksim Terentyev
39	GK	RUS	Yegor Bikeyev
43	MF	RUS	Aleksandr Golubtsov
44	DF	RUS	Aleksey Chubukin
63	MF	RUS	Artyom Glotov
66	MF	RUS	Ildar Nugayev
70	DF	RUS	Dinar Khaybullin
84	DF	RUS	Pavel Rostov
88	MF	RUS	Daniil Fedotov
