= SKA SKVO Stadium =

Stadium in Rostov-on-Don, Russia

Coordinates: 47°16′18″N 39°43′40″E

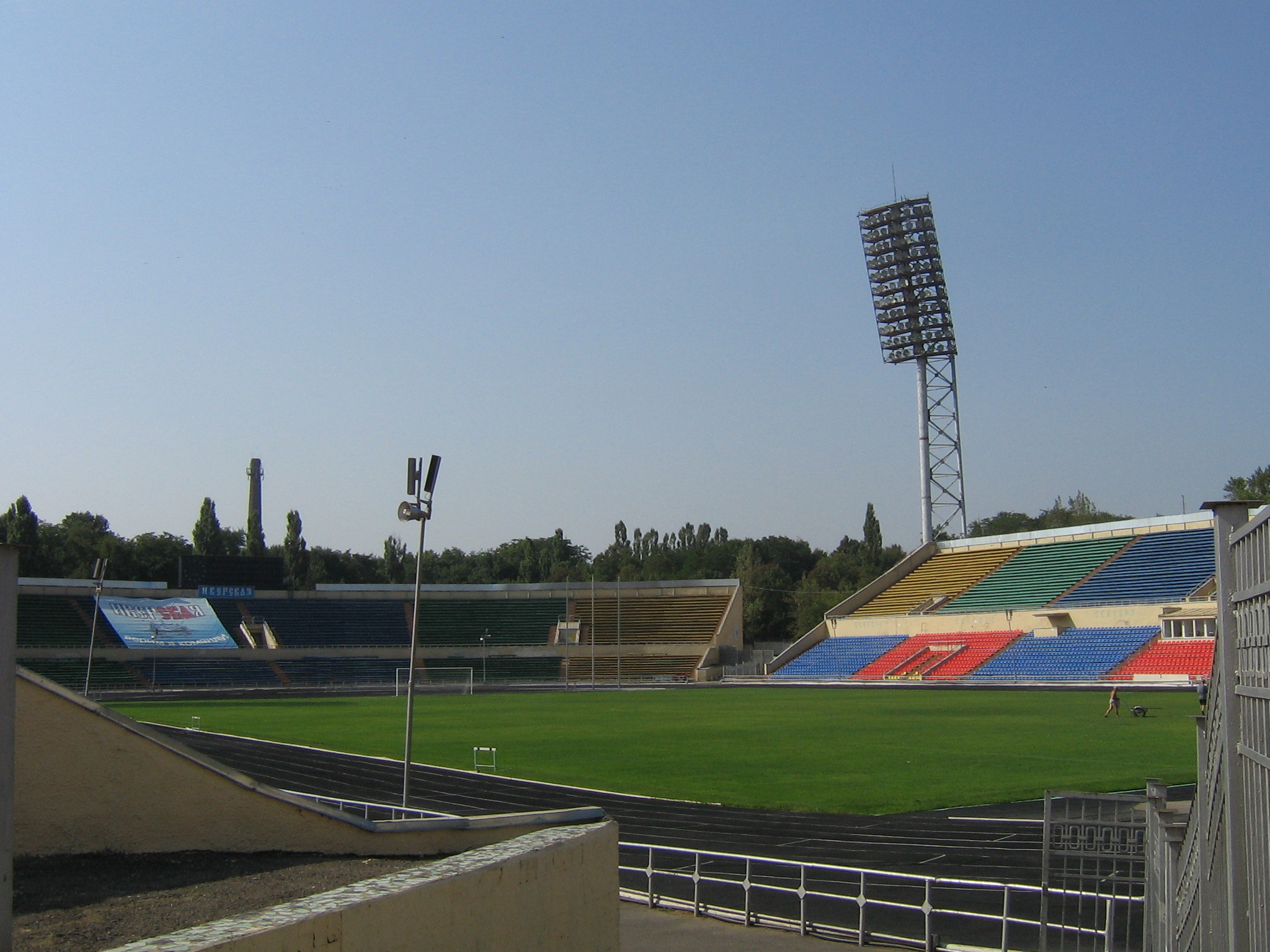
SKA SKVO stadium in 2006

Stadion SKA SKVO (Russian: Стадион СКА-СКВО) is a multi-purpose stadium in Rostov-on-Don, Russia. It is currently used mostly for football matches and is the home ground for FC SKA Rostov-on-Don. The stadium is refurbished and holds 2,200 people.

== History ==
The construction of the sports complex was started in the mid-sixties on the initiative of the Commander of the Troops of the North Caucasus Military District, Colonel-General Altunin.

On 28 January 2016, the International Federation of Football Associations (FIFA) approved a list of 36 training grounds for the 2018 FIFA World Cup, including the "SKA" stadium in this application. In this regard, it is necessary to reconstruct the stadium to bring it in line with the requirements. In 2020, as part of the project to revive the SKA Rostov football club, new owner Basta, with the assistance of the Rostec State Corporation, planned to modernize the stadium.

== Characteristics ==
- Year of foundation: 1971
