= Nikita Andreyev (footballer, born March 1997) =

Russian football player

Personal information
- Full name: Nikita Vyacheslavovich Andreyev
- Date of birth: 23 March 1997 (age 29)
- Place of birth: Vladimir, Russia
- Height: 1.76 m (5 ft 9 in)
- Position: Forward

Senior career*
Years	Team	Apps	(Gls)
2014–2018	Shinnik Yaroslavl	8	(0)
2016–2017	→ Sakhalin Yuzhno-Sakhalinsk (loan)	16	(2)
2017–2018	→ FC Murom (loan)	22	(2)
2018–2023	Torpedo Vladimir	98	(28)
2023	Dynamo Kirov	5	(0)
- * Club domestic league appearances and goals

Nikita Vyacheslavovich Andreyev (Russian: Никита Вячеславович Андреев; born 23 March 1997) is a Russian former football player.

== Club career ==
He made his debut in the Russian Football National League for FC Shinnik Yaroslavl on 8 November 2014 in a game against FC Volga Nizhny Novgorod.
