= Dynamo Stadium (Bryansk) =

Sports venue in Bryansk, Russia

Coordinates: 53°19′05.75″N 34°17′08.84″E

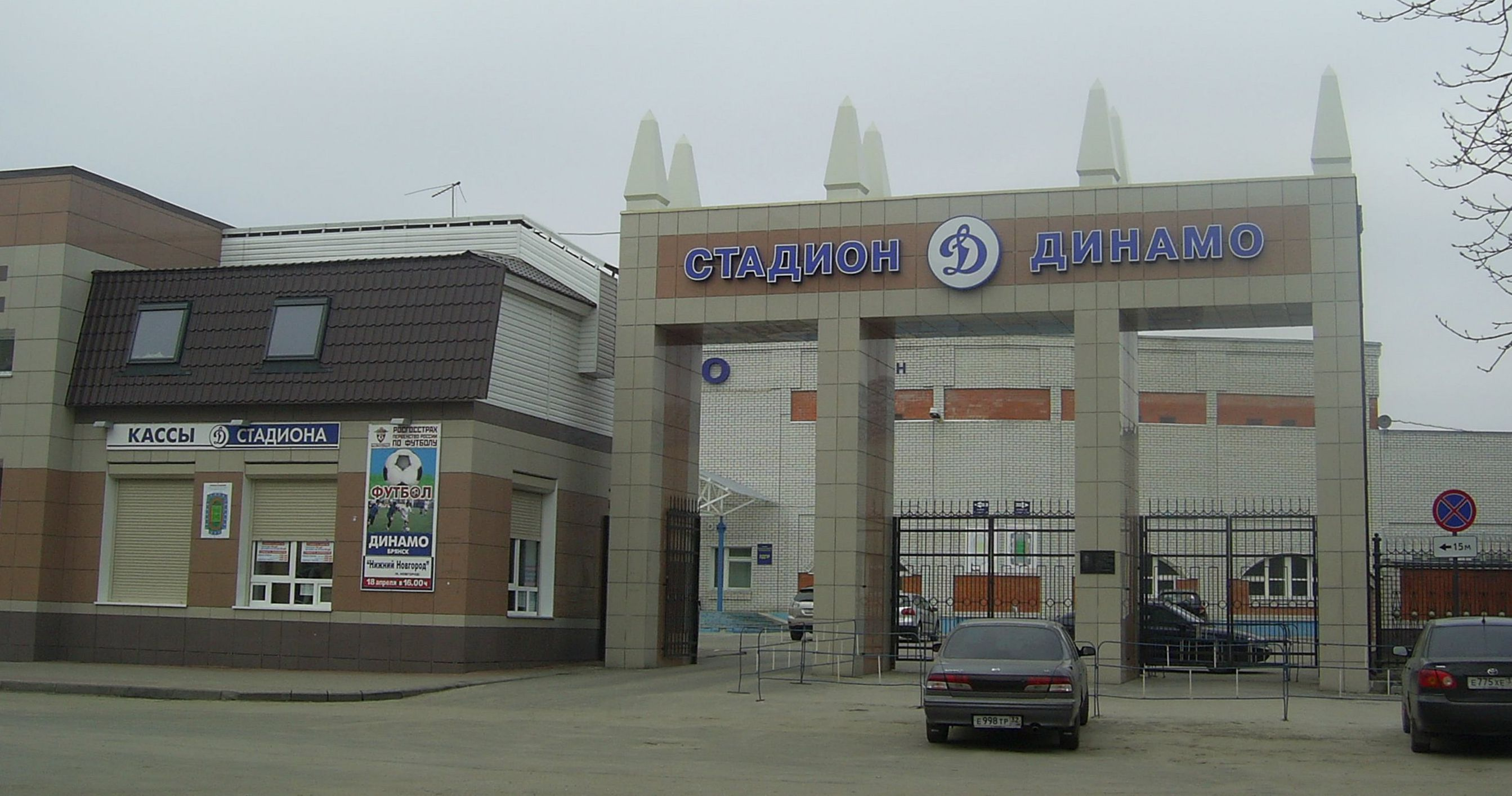
- Interactive map of Dynamo Stadium
- Location: Gagarin Boulevard, 28, Bryansk, Russia
- Capacity: 10,100
- Field size: 105 by 68 metres (344 ft × 223 ft)

Construction
- Opened: 1924
- Renovated: 1960, 2004

Tenant
- Dynamo Bryansk

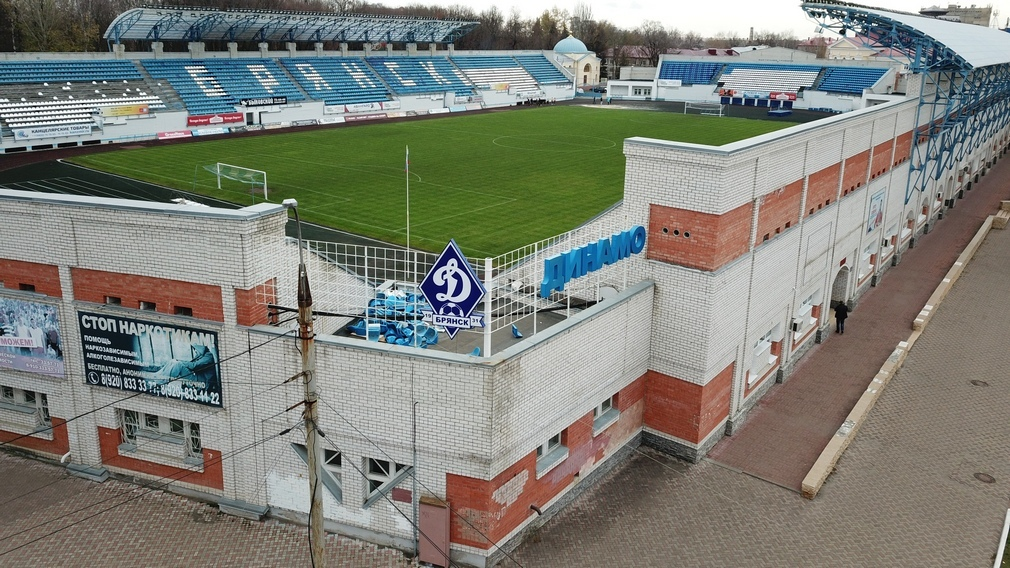
Dynamo Stadium

Dynamo Stadium is a multi-purpose stadium in Bryansk, Russia. It was built in 1924, refitted in 1960 and 2004 years. Stadium is currently used mostly for football matches and is the home ground of FC Dynamo Bryansk. The stadium holds up to 10,100 people. The field has a size of 105×68 m.

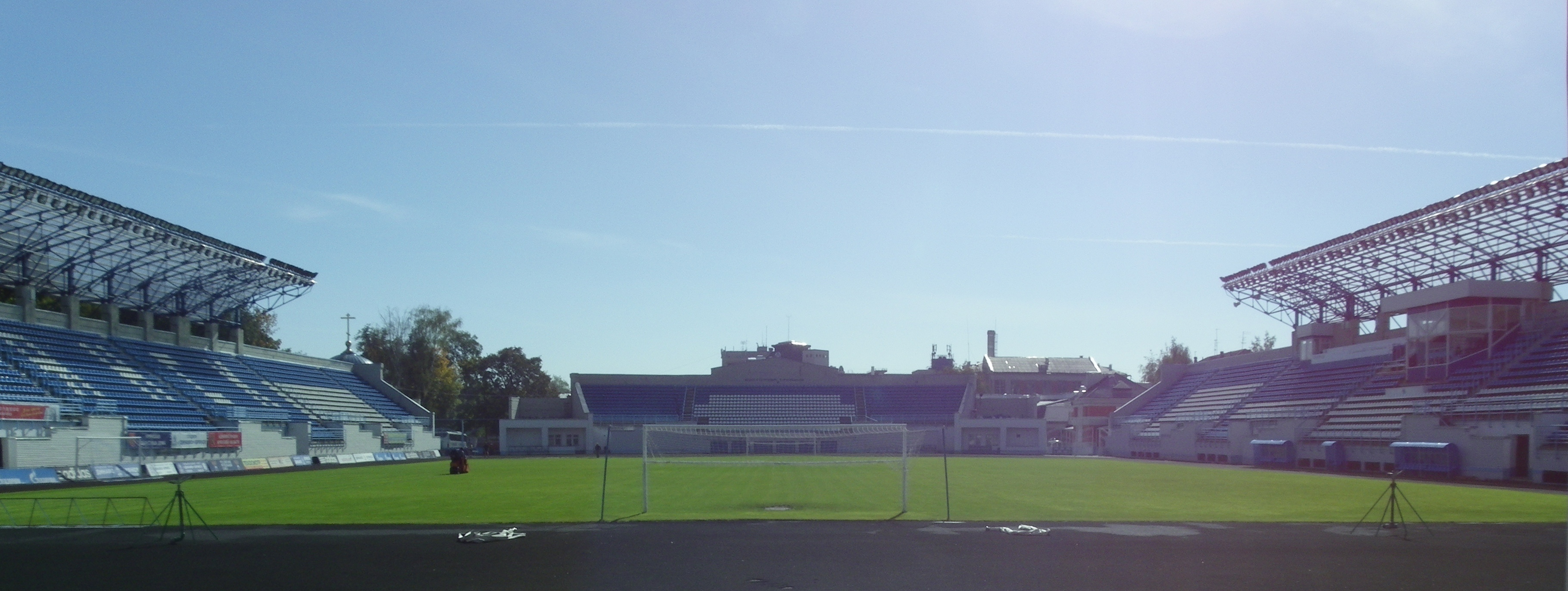
The football field of the stadium (2012)

== History ==
In 1924, the Provincial Stadium named after V.I. Lenin was built (the first official name of the stadium). There was only one grandstand, it consisted of 5-6 rows, accommodating 3,000 spectators.

In 1929, the name changed to the Bryansk City Stadium.

In the 1930s, the stadium was transferred to the Dynamo Sports Club.

In 1964, illuminators were installed around the perimeter of the stadium.

In 2001, it was decided to reconstruct the stadium.

== See also ==
- FC Dynamo Bryansk
