= Dynamo Stadium (Barnaul) =

Sports venue in Barnaul, Russia

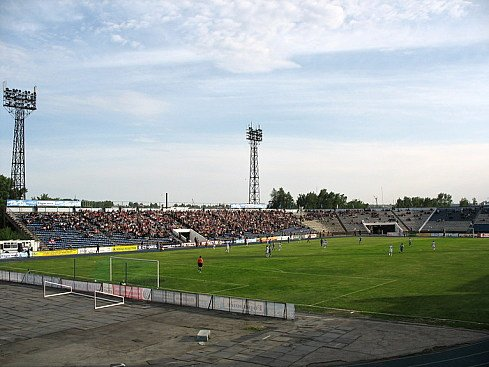
- Interactive map of Dynamo Stadium
- Location: Barnaul, Russia
- Coordinates: 53°20′09.70″N 83°47′36.09″E
- Capacity: 16,000

Construction
- Opened: 1927

Tenant
- FC Dynamo Barnaul

Dynamo Stadium (Russian: Стадион Динамо) is a multi-use stadium in Barnaul, Russia. It is currently used mostly for football matches and is the home ground of FC Dynamo Barnaul. The stadium holds 22,000 people.

== See also ==
- Dynamo (disambiguation)
