= Torpedo Stadium (Vladimir) =

Football stadium in Vladimir, Russia

Coordinates: 56°07′24.70″N 40°23′32.92″E

Torpedo
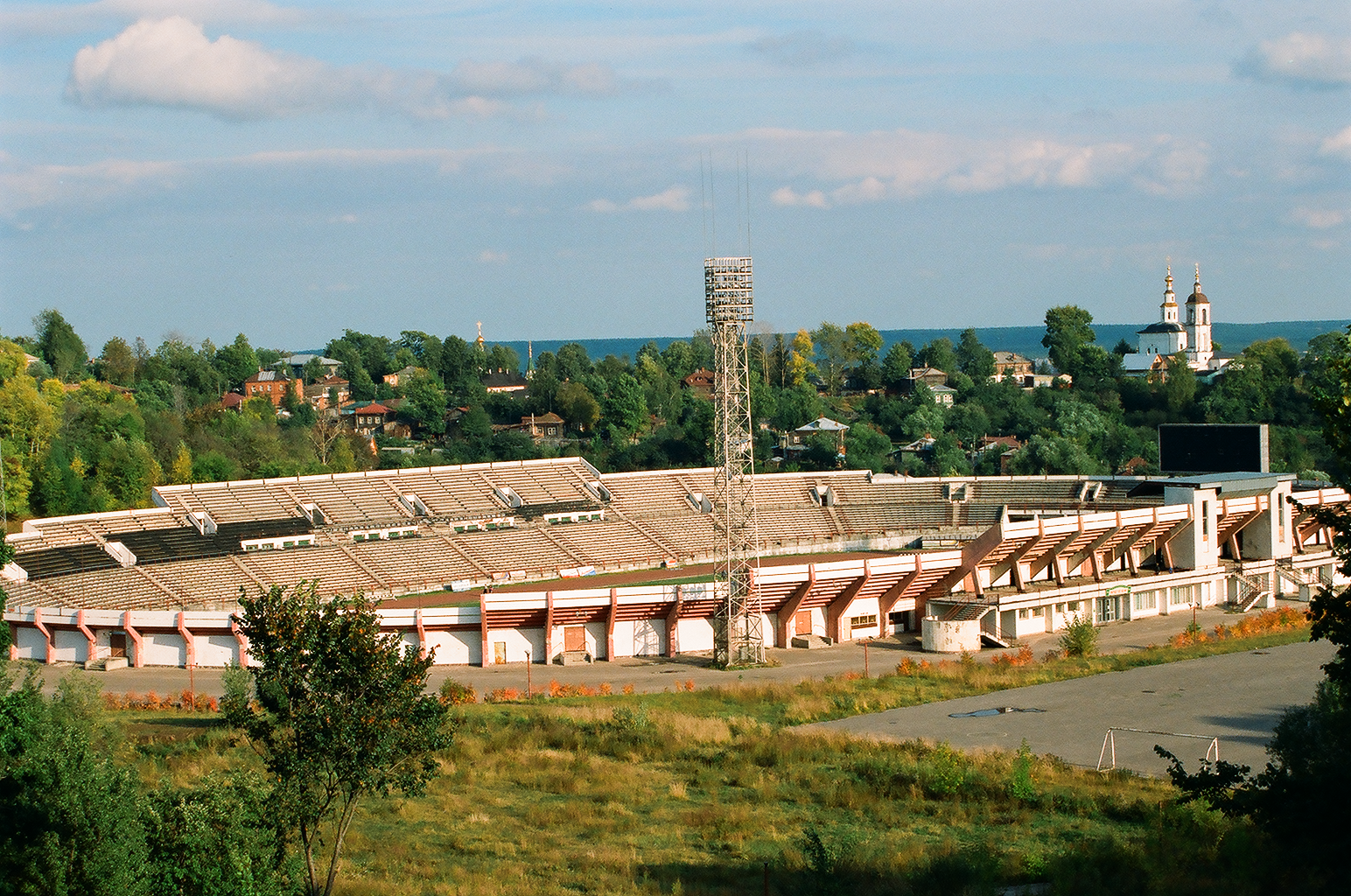
- Interactive map of Torpedo
- Location: Dvoryanskaya Street, 67, Vladimir, Russia
- Owner: Vladimir Tractor Factory
- Operator: Torpedo-Vladimir
- Capacity: 19,700
- Surface: Grass

Construction
- Groundbreaking: September 1948
- Opened: March 1988
- Cost: N/A

Torpedo stadium is a football stadium situated in the central part of Vladimir city, Russia.

The stadium, built in 1948-1950, consisted of a football field and running-track, had a seating capacity of more than 19,700. Renovations in 1958 improved the quality of the football pitch, improving athletic conditions.

In 1978 the stadium was destroyed presupposing that the new one will be constructed for Olympic team training, but no financing came from Moscow, so Vladimir had no stadium until 1988 when Vladimir Tractor Factory found a way to get extra money from Soviet Ministry of Transport particularly for sporting needs. The quality of the building was poor, so until now it has already had several repairs.
