= FC Saransk =

Russian football team based in Moscow

- Full name: Football Club Saransk
- Founded: 2021
- Dissolved: 2022
- Ground: Mordovia Arena
- Capacity: 43,958
- 2021–22: FNL 2, Group 3, 7th
- Website: http://www.fcsaransk.ru/
Home colours	Away colours	Third colours

FC Saransk (Russian: ФК «Саранск») was a Russian football team based in Saransk.

== Club history ==
FC Mordovia Saransk, which represented Saransk in the Russian Premier League for several seasons, went bankrupt and lost professional status in August 2020, leaving Saransk as the only 2018 FIFA World Cup host city without a professional team, and Mordovia Arena without a tenant. On 11 April 2021, the acting head of Republic of Mordovia Artyom Zdunov ordered to create a new professional club in the city, and FC Saransk was created.

The new club was licensed for the third-tier Russian FNL 2 for the 2021–22 season in June 2021. The club did not receive the license for the 2022–23 season due to lack of financing and was subsequently dissolved.
