= 2017–18 Russian Cup =

Olimp Russian Cup

Tournament details
- Country: Russia
- Teams: 98

Final positions
- Champions: Tosno (1st title)
- Runners-up: Avangard Kursk

Tournament statistics
- Matches played: 95
- Goals scored: 259 (2.73 per match)
- Top goal scorer: Aleksandr Sobolev (4 goals)

The 2017–18 Russian Cup was the 26th season of the Russian football knockout tournament since the dissolution of Soviet Union.

The competition started on 14 July 2017 and finished on 9 May 2018. The winners, FC Tosno, could have earned a spot in the 2018–19 UEFA Europa League group stage, but did not obtain the UEFA license and was closed a month later due to financial problems.

== Representation of clubs in leagues ==
- Russian Premier League: 16 clubs;
- Russian Football National League: 18 clubs;
- Russian Professional Football League: 57 clubs;
- Russian Amateur Football League: 3 clubs: Dynamo Kostroma, Zvezda Saint Petersburg, Metallurg Asha;
- Russian Regional League: 2 clubs: FC Belogorsk, FC Delin Izhevsk;
- Total: 96 clubs.

== First round ==
West and Centre

15 July 2017	Zvezda Saint Petersburg (4)	0–0 (a.e.t.) (4–2 p)	Luki-Energiya Velikiye Luki (3)	Saint Petersburg
14:00 MSK (UTC+3)		Report		Stadium: Nova Arena; Attendance: 400; Referee: Anton Frolov (Moscow)
	Penalties
	Yepifanov (penalty scored); Barantsev (penalty scored); Agafonov (penalty scored); Smirnov (penalty scored)		(penalty scored) Proshin; (penalty missed) Raychenko; (penalty scored) Chernukhin; (penalty missed) Domrachyov

Ural-Povolzhye

14 July 2017	Delin-Izhevsk (5)	3–0	Dynamo Kirov (3)	Izhevsk
14:00 SAMT (UTC+4)	Maltsev 32'; Semenov 73'; Bidzhiyev 89'	Report		Stadium: Central Stadium; Attendance: 200; Referee: Ildar Godunov (Saransk)

14 July 2017	Metallurg Asha (4)	3–1	Nosta Novotroitsk (3)	Asha
18:00 YEKT (UTC+5)	Vasilchenko 54'; Kupryakov 65'; Gvozd 66'	Report	Sazonov 50'	Stadium: Metallurg Stadium; Attendance: 700; Referee: Mikhail Nebogatikov (Kazan)

14 July 2017	Volga Ulyanovsk (3)	2–0	Anzhi-Yunior (3)	Ulyanovsk
18:00 SAMT (UTC+4)	Georgi Zaikin 13'; Bikchantayev 25'	Report		Stadium: Start Stadium; Attendance: 1200; Referee: Kirill Silantyev (Samara)

14 July 2017	Zenit-Izhevsk (3)	1–0 (a.e.t.)	FC Chelyabinsk (3)	Izhevsk
18:00 SAMT (UTC+4)	Yatsuk 108'	Report		Stadium: Kupol Stadium; Attendance: 1,500; Referee: Ranel Ziyakov (Naberezhnye Chelny)

15 July 2017	KAMAZ Naberezhnye Chelny (3)	1–0	Neftekhimik Nizhnekamsk (3)	Naberezhnye Chelny
17:00 SAMT (UTC+4)	Chushyalov 25'	Report		Stadium: KAMAZ Stadium; Attendance: 2,000; Referee: Vladislav Rybakov (Ulyanovsk)

15 July 2017	Mordovia Saransk (3)	0–1	Syzran-2003 (3)	Saransk
16:00 MSK (UTC+3)		Report	Galiakberov 90'	Stadium: Start Stadium; Attendance: 1115; Referee: Dmitri Sukhov (Nizhny Novgorod)

15 July 2017	Sokol Saratov (3)	1–0	Zenit Penza (3)	Saratov
17:00 SAMT (UTC+4)	Zakharyan 79'	Report		Stadium: Lokomotiv Stadium; Attendance: 950; Referee: Yan Marushko (Samara)

South

15 July 2017	Akademiya Futbola (3)	0–4	Chayka Peschanokopskoye (3)	Bataysk
17:00 MSK (UTC+3)		Report	Pyotr Sitnikov 12'; Obozny 14'; Gudayev 43'; Kartashov 68'	Stadium: Lokomotiv Stadium; Attendance: 500; Referee: Sergei Smirnov (Kislovodsk)

15 July 2017	Biolog-Novokubansk (3)	1–5	Druzhba Maykop (3)	Progress
17:00 MSK (UTC+3)	Yanzin 10'	Report	Yakovlev 19'; Byrlov 22'; Goyayev 30' (o.g.); Konov 45' (pen.); Osmolovskiy 83'	Stadium: Progress; Attendance: 500; Referee: Aleksei Ivannikov (Stavropol)

15 July 2017	Mashuk-KMV Pyatigorsk (3)	4–0	Spartak Vladikavkaz (3)	Pyatigorsk
18:00 MSK (UTC+3)	Parsadanyan 47'; Khugayev 82'; Karibov 87'; Dzhatiyev 89'	Report		Stadium: Central Stadium; Attendance: 250; Referee: Dmitri Streltsov (Rostov-on-Don)

== Second round ==
East

24 July 2017	FC Belogorsk (5)	0–2	Smena Komsomolsk-na-Amure (3)	Belogorsk
18:00 YAKT (UTC+9)		Report	Yurchenko 13'; Shvedyuk 77'	Stadium: Amurselmash; Attendance: 850; Referee: Anton Anopa

West and Centre

23 July 2017	Znamya Truda (3)	1–1 (4–3 p)	FC Murom (3)	Orekhovo-Zuyevo
14:00 MSK (UTC+3)	Avanesyan 70'	Report	Rytov 64'	Stadium: Torpedo Stadium; Attendance: 400; Referee: Maksim Chembulatov
	Penalties
	Mishel Savelyev (penalty scored); Avanesyan (penalty scored); Ukolov (penalty scored); Zilabyan (penalty missed); Yolkin (penalty scored)		(penalty missed) Sapayev; (penalty missed) Shcherbak; (penalty scored) Kiverin; (penalty scored) Drukovskiy

23 July 2017	Zorky Krasnogorsk (3)	2–0	Zvezda Ryazan (3)	Krasnogorsk
15:00 MSK (UTC+3)	Logua 67'; Dubchak 87'	Report		Stadium: Zorky Stadium; Attendance: 1,500; Referee: Roman Chernov

23 July 2017	FSK Dolgoprudny (3)	1–3	Ararat Moscow (3)	Dolgoprudny
16:00 MSK (UTC+3)	Larionov 27'	Report	Voronkin 13'; Khurtsidze 42', 71'	Stadium: Salyut Stadium; Attendance: 1,300; Referee: Artur Fyodorov

23 July 2017	Dynamo Bryansk (3)	2–1	CRFSO Smolensk (3)	Bryansk
16:00 MSK (UTC+3)	Yerkin 40'; Artyom Maslevskiy 71' (pen.)	Report	Yerkin 36' (o.g.)	Stadium: Dynamo Stadium; Attendance: 6,000; Referee: Oleg Yevstigneev

23 July 2017	Pskov-747 (3)	2–0	Zvezda Saint Petersburg (4)	Pskov
16:00 MSK (UTC+3)	Sakadeyev 16'; Shishayev 83'	Report		Stadium: Stadium 747; Attendance: 500; Referee: Yuri Karpov

23 July 2017	Spartak Kostroma (3)	1–5	Tekstilshchik Ivanovo (3)	Karavaevo
16:00 MSK (UTC+3)	A. Yakovlev 38'	Report	Podymov 35'; Alekseyev 45', 51'; Orlov 85'; Popov 87'	Stadium: Urozhay Stadium; Attendance: 500; Referee: Ivan Abrosimov

23 July 2017	Chertanovo Moscow (3)	2–1	Strogino Moscow (3)	Moscow
17:00 MSK (UTC+3)	Tsypchenko 57'; Glushenkov 85'	Report	Sergeyev 90+1'	Stadium: Arena Chertanovo; Attendance: 350; Referee: Ivan Sarayev

23 July 2017	Khimik Novomoskovsk (3)	0–3	FC Kaluga (3)	Novomoskovsk
17:00 MSK (UTC+3)		Report	Rodin 12', 29'; Dubrovin 40'	Stadium: Khimik Stadium; Attendance: 1,100; Referee: Sergei Tikhonov

23 July 2017	FC Kolomna (3)	0–1	Saturn Ramenskoye (3)	Kolomna
17:00 MSK (UTC+3)		Report	Yan Shanin 82'	Stadium: Trud Stadium; Attendance: 600; Referee: Taras Shevchenko

23 July 2017	Veles Moscow (3)	0–1	Torpedo Moscow (3)	Moscow
17:00 MSK (UTC+3)		Report	Korotkov 30' (o.g.)	Stadium: Avtomobilist Stadium; Attendance: 400; Referee: Pyotr Miroshnichenko

23 July 2017	Energomash Belgorod (3)	1–0	Metallurg Lipetsk (3)	Belgorod
19:00 MSK (UTC+3)	Dyogtev 3'	Report		Stadium: Energomash Stadium; Attendance: 3,000; Referee: Roman Safyan

24 July 2017	Dynamo Kostroma (4)	2–3	Torpedo Vladimir (3)	Kostroma
19:00 MSK (UTC+3)	Privalov 45' (pen.); Ilya Shalanin 74'	Report	Lobanov 7'; Bayev 42'; Zaikin 51'	Stadium: Dynamo Stadium; Attendance: 600; Referee: Ilya Ivanov

Ural-Povolzhye

23 July 2017	Metallurg Asha (4)	1–3 (a.e.t.)	Zenit-Izhevsk (3)	Asha
17:00 YEKT (UTC+5)	Rostislav Gritsenko 6'	Report	Tenyayev 60'; Vasili Panev 93' (pen.); Pugachyov 101'	Stadium: Metallurg Stadium; Attendance: 600; Referee: Vladislav Rybakov

23 July 2017	KAMAZ Naberezhnye Chelny (3)	1–2 (a.e.t.)	Volga Ulyanovsk (3)	Naberezhnye Chelny
16:00 MSK (UTC+3)	Khubayev 72'	Report	Voronin 59'; Konstantin Pavlov 92'	Stadium: KAMAZ Stadium; Attendance: 1,000; Referee: Dmitri Smirnov

23 July 2017	Syzran-2003 (3)	4–2	Delin-Izhevsk (5)	Syzran
17:00 SAMT (UTC+4)	Nikulov 24'; Vasili Berezun 33' (pen.); Andreyev 73'; Galiakberov 77'	Report	Yashkin 26'; Nikulov 65' (o.g.)	Stadium: Central Stadium; Attendance: 1,800; Referee: Mikhail Nebogatikov

23 July 2017	Lada-Togliatti (3)	1–3	Sokol Saratov (3)	Tolyatti
18:30 SAMT (UTC+4)	Churavtsev 11'	Report	Dudikov 4'; Kurzenyov 8'; Butakov 28'	Stadium: Torpedo Stadium; Attendance: 1,000; Referee: Yegor Yegorov

South

24 July 2017	Angusht Nazran (3)	2–0	Legion-Dynamo Makhachkala (3)	Nazran
17:00 MSK (UTC+3)	Gitinov 40'; Yanursayev 80'	Report		Stadium: Rashid Aushev Central Stadium; Attendance: 450; Referee: Dmitri Streltsov

24 July 2017	Chayka Peschanokopskoye (3)	0–1	Afips Afipsky (3)	Peschanokopskoye
17:00 MSK (UTC+3)		Report	Gevorkyan 21'	Stadium: Central Stadium; Attendance: 700; Referee: Aleksei Ivannikov

24 July 2017	SKA Rostov-on-Don (3)	0–5	FC Armavir (3)	Bataysk
17:00 MSK (UTC+3)		Report	Gadzhibekov 21', 82'; Solovyov 24'; Miroshnichenko 49' (pen.); Sinyavsky 57'	Stadium: Lokomotiv Stadium; Attendance: 500; Referee: Sergei Kostevich

24 July 2017	Rotor-2 Volgograd (3)	0–1	Dynamo Stavropol (3)	Volzhsky
17:30 MSK (UTC+3)		Report	Volkov 38'	Stadium: Loginov Stadium; Attendance: 300; Referee: Vladimir Shamara

24 July 2017	Druzhba Maykop (3)	2–4	Chernomorets Novorossiysk (3)	Maykop
18:00 MSK (UTC+3)	Kazharovy 81'; Kadimov 90+1'	Report	Prus 5', 45'; Chaly 38'; Nevidimy 59' (o.g.)	Stadium: Druzhba Stadium; Attendance: 500; Referee: Aleksandr Mashlyakevich

24 July 2017	Spartak Nalchik (3)	1–0	Mashuk-KMV Pyatigorsk (3)	Nalchik
18:30 MSK (UTC+3)	Khalid Shakhtiyev 56'	Report		Stadium: Spartak Stadium; Attendance: 500; Referee: Vitali Yermakov

== Third round ==
East

1 August 2017	Smena Komsomolsk-na-Amure (3)	1–0	Sakhalin Yuzhno-Sakhalinsk (3)	Komsomolsk-on-Amur
18:00 VLAT (UTC+10)	Yurchenko 69' (pen.)	Report		Stadium: Metallurg Stadium; Attendance: 1,100; Referee: Sergei Tsyganyuk

1 August 2017	Zenit Irkutsk (3)	1–5	FC Chita (3)	Irkutsk
18:00 IRKT (UTC+8)	Gandilyan 14'	Report	Podprugin 19'; Razborov 23', 63'; Motov 90'; Vladimir Markov 90+2'	Stadium: Zvezda Stadium; Attendance: 1,400; Referee: Artyom Petrenko

1 August 2017	Irtysh Omsk (3)	3–2	Dynamo Barnaul (3)	Omsk
18:00 OMST (UTC+6)	Sergei Bulanov 50', 55'; Yudov 58'	Report	Viktor Lipin 42', 72'	Stadium: Red Star Stadium; Attendance: 1,300; Referee: Aleksei Avtukhovich

West and Center

7 August 2017	Znamya Truda (3)	2–1	Zorky Krasnogorsk (3)	Orekhovo-Zuyevo
17:00 MSK (UTC+3)	Yolkin 90' (pen.); Yakovlev 90+1'	Report	Pavlov 68'	Stadium: Torpedo Stadium; Attendance: 600; Referee: Aleksei Kuznetsov

7 August 2017	FC Kaluga (3)	1–2	Energomash Belgorod (3)	Kaluga
18:00 MSK (UTC+3)	Dubrovin 68' (pen.)	Report	Faskhutdinov 12'; Mikhalitsyn 52'	Stadium: Annenki Arena; Attendance: 1,000; Referee: Artur Fyodorov

7 August 2017	Dynamo Bryansk (3)	2–0	Pskov-747 (3)	Bryansk
18:30 MSK (UTC+3)	Yerkin 27'; Lukanchenkov 42'	Report		Stadium: Dynamo Stadium; Attendance: 2,500; Referee: Konstantin Yudanov

7 August 2017	Tekstilshchik Ivanovo (3)	0–0 (a.e.t.) (3–4 p)	Torpedo Vladimir (3)	Ivanovo
18:30 MSK (UTC+3)		Report		Stadium: Tekstilshchik Stadium; Attendance: 5,000; Referee: Maksim Chembulatov
	Penalties
	Shilov (penalty scored); Fomin (penalty scored); Zimarev (penalty missed); Podymov (penalty scored); Shchanitsyn (penalty missed)		(penalty scored) Zinin; (penalty missed) Lobanov; (penalty scored) Gladyshev; (penalty scored) Volosyan; (penalty scored) Zaikin

7 August 2017	Torpedo Moscow (3)	1–2	Chertanovo Moscow (3)	Moscow
18:30 MSK (UTC+3)	Kashayev 50' (pen.)	Report	Molchanov 46'; Gorshkov 50'	Stadium: Spartak Academy Stadium; Attendance: 500; Referee: Anton Frolov

7 August 2017	Ararat Moscow (3)	1–0	Saturn Ramenskoye (3)	Moscow
19:00 MSK (UTC+3)	Toboyev 83'	Report		Stadium: Eduard Streltsov Stadium; Attendance: 900; Referee: Pyotr Miroshnichenko

Ural–Povolzhye

7 August 2017	Volga Ulyanovsk (3)	1–1 (a.e.t.) (1–3 p)	Syzran-2003 (3)	Ulyanovsk
18:00 SAMT (UTC+4)	Chyorny 94'	Report	Vasili Berezun 116' (pen.)	Stadium: Start Stadium; Attendance: 2,000; Referee: Sergei Cheban
	Penalties
	Aleksandr Yegurnev (penalty missed); Chyorny (penalty scored); Voronin (penalty missed); Bikchantayev (penalty missed)		(penalty missed) Zimulka; (penalty scored) Andreyev; (penalty scored) Nikulov

7 August 2017	Sokol Saratov (3)	2–2 (a.e.t.) (5–3 p)	Zenit-Izhevsk (3)	Saratov
19:00 SAMT (UTC+4)	Kurzenyov 53'; Zakharyan 105'	Report	Yatsuk 43'; Malakhovskiy 102'	Stadium: Lokomotiv Stadium; Attendance: 1,200; Referee: Taras Shevchenko
	Penalties
	Baryshnikov (penalty scored); Kurzenyov (penalty scored); Rakhmatulin (penalty scored); Izosimov (penalty scored); Dudikov (penalty scored)		(penalty missed) Vasili Panev; (penalty scored) Makushkin; (penalty scored) Semyakin; (penalty scored) Yatsuk

South

8 August 2017	Angusht Nazran (3)	2–3 (a.e.t.)	Spartak Nalchik (3)	Nazran
17:00 MSK (UTC+3)	Musluyev 34' (o.g.); Konov 90'	Report	Akhriyev 31'; Aliyev 36'; Guguyev 95'	Stadium: Rashid Aushev Central Stadium; Attendance: 580; Referee: Vitali Yermakov

8 August 2017	FC Armavir (3)	4–0	Dynamo Stavropol (3)	Armavir
19:00 MSK (UTC+3)	Zhdanov 3'; Mustafayev 19'; Miroshnichenko 33' (pen.); Paderin 64'	Report		Stadium: Yunost Stadium; Attendance: 1,300; Referee: Rpman Safyan

8 August 2017	Chernomorets Novorossiysk (3)	2–0 (a.e.t.)	Afips Afipsky (3)	Novorossiysk
19:00 MSK (UTC+3)	Minosyan 95'; Mendel 111' (o.g.)	Report		Stadium: Central Stadium; Attendance: 3,000; Referee: Roman Chernov

== Fourth round ==
FNL clubs entered at this stage (except for FC Zenit-2 Saint Petersburg and FC Spartak-2 Moscow).

23 August 2017	FC Chita (3)	1–1 (a.e.t.) (7–8 p)	Yenisey Krasnoyarsk (2)	Chita
18:30 YAKT (UTC+9)	Razborov 32'	Report	Rudnev 22'	Stadium: Lokomotiv Stadium; Attendance: 1,200; Referee: Artyom Petrenko (Novosibirsk)
	Penalties
	Maksim Yeruslanov (penalty scored); Yefremov (penalty scored); Podprugin (penalty scored); Artyom Yarkin (penalty scored); Bodyalov (penalty scored); Motov (penalty scored); Novitskiy (penalty scored); Volgin (penalty missed)		(penalty scored) Isayev; (penalty scored) Mildzikhov; (penalty scored) Lomakin; (penalty scored) Semakin; (penalty scored) Fatullayev; (penalty scored) Vasilyev; (penalty scored) Maloyan; (penalty scored) Rudnev

23 August 2017	Irtysh Omsk (3)	0–4	Tom Tomsk (2)	Omsk
17:30 OMST (UTC+6)		Report	Sokolov 76', 80'; Salakhutdinov 81'; Sanaya 83'	Stadium: Red Star Stadium (Indoor); Attendance: 2,100; Referee: Aleksandr Kurbatov (Magnitogorsk)

23 August 2017	Znamya Truda (3)	0–1	Fakel Voronezh (2)	Orekhovo-Zuyevo
16:30 MSK (UTC+3)		Report	Khaymanov 41'	Stadium: Znamya Truda Stadium; Attendance: 1,000; Referee: Roman Chernov (Moscow)

23 August 2017	Chertanovo Moscow (3)	0–2	Dynamo Saint Petersburg (2)	Moscow
17:00 MSK (UTC+3)		Report	Pasko 21'; Rogov 29'	Stadium: Chertanovo Arena; Attendance: 500; Referee: Dmitri Streltsov (Rostov-on-Don)

23 August 2017	FC Tyumen (2)	2–1	Sibir Novosibirsk (2)	Tyumen
19:00 YEKT (UTC+5)	Gladyshev 11' (o.g.); Leshonok 78'	Report	Galysh 61'	Stadium: Geolog Stadium; Attendance: 2,000; Referee: Oleg Sokolov (Voronezh)

23 August 2017	Rotor Volgograd (2)	0–2	Volgar Astrakhan (2)	Astrakhan
18:00 MSK (UTC+3)		Report	Zhabkin 17' (pen.); Babayev 53'	Stadium: Central Stadium; Attendance: 2,100; Referee: Ivan Sidenkov (Saint Petersburg)
Note: The game was played in Astrakhan due to reconstruction of Rotor's stadium

23 August 2017	Sokol Saratov (3)	1–3	FC Orenburg (2)	Saratov
19:00 SAMT (UTC+4)	Dudikov 45' (pen.)	Report	Chirkin 11'; Yefremov 54'; Vorobyov 90+2'	Stadium: Lokomotiv Stadium; Attendance: 2,300; Referee: Igor Panin (Dmitrov)

23 August 2017	Syzran-2003 (3)	0–2	Krylia Sovetov Samara (2)	Syzran
19:00 SAMT (UTC+4)		Report	Tkachuk 26', 90'	Stadium: Central Stadium; Attendance: 5,000; Referee: Konstantin Yudanov (Moscow)

23 August 2017	Dynamo Bryansk (3)	0–1	Avangard Kursk (2)	Bryansk
18:30 MSK (UTC+3)		Report	Korobov 51'	Stadium: Dynamo Stadium; Attendance: 3,200; Referee: Dmitri Veselov (Moscow)

23 August 2017	Spartak Nalchik (3)	1–1 (a.e.t.) (4–2 p)	Chernomorets Novorossiysk (3)	Nalchik
18:30 MSK (UTC+3)	Tlupov 94'	Report	Prus 115'	Stadium: Spartak Stadium; Attendance: 600; Referee: Sergey Smirnov (Kislovodsk)
	Penalties
	Khalid Shakhtiyev (penalty scored); Abazov (penalty scored); Mikhaylenko (penalty missed); Akhriyev (penalty scored); Mironov (penalty scored)		(penalty scored) Reznikov; (penalty scored) Dmitri Bakay; (penalty missed) Soltanov; (penalty missed) Pulyayev

23 August 2017	Torpedo Vladimir (3)	0–1	Olimpiyets Nizhny Novgorod (2)	Vladimir
18:30 MSK (UTC+3)		Report	Sorochkin 41'	Stadium: Torpedo Stadium; Attendance: 3,200; Referee: Sergei Cheban (Moscow)

23 August 2017	Ararat Moscow (3)	2–1	Baltika Kaliningrad (2)	Moscow
19:00 MSK (UTC+3)	Khurtsidze 9'; Davydov 41'	Report	Stepanets 23'	Stadium: Eduard Streltsov Stadium; Attendance: 1,000; Referee: Ranel Ziyakov (Naberezhnye Chelny)

23 August 2017	FC Armavir (3)	0–0 (a.e.t.) (2–3 p)	Kuban Krasnodar (2)	Armavir
19:00 MSK (UTC+3)		Report		Stadium: Yunost Stadium; Attendance: 2,000; Referee: Dmitry Smirnov (Moscow)
	Penalties
	Miroshnichenko (penalty missed); Zhdanov (penalty missed); Safin (penalty scored); Sinyavsky (penalty scored); Sobol (penalty missed)		(penalty missed) Kausarov; (penalty scored) Zavezyon; (penalty missed) Konovalov; (penalty scored) Sidorov; (penalty scored) Gapon

23 August 2017	Energomash Belgorod (3)	0–1	FC Tambov (2)	Belgorod
19:00 MSK (UTC+3)		Report	Gafar 6'	Stadium: Energomash Stadium; Attendance: 5,000; Referee: Ivan Abrosimov (Saint Petersburg)

23 August 2017	FC Khimki (2)	0–2	Shinnik Yaroslavl (2)	Khimki
19:00 MSK (UTC+3)		Report	Lyakh 29'; Samoylov 87'	Stadium: Novye Khimki Stadium; Attendance: 1,130; Referee: Artyom Lyubimov (Saint Petersburg)

24 August 2017	Smena Komsomolsk-na-Amure (3)	0–0 (a.e.t.) (2–3 p)	Luch-Energiya Vladivostok (2)	Komsomolsk-na-Amure
17:30 VLAT (UTC+10)		Report		Stadium: Metallurg Stadium; Attendance: 1,500; Referee: Anton Frolov (Moscow)
	Penalties
	Stanislav Pavlov (penalty scored); Dmitri Rashchupkin (penalty missed); Baldin (penalty scored); Yan (penalty missed); Yurchenko (penalty missed)		(penalty missed) Malyaka; (penalty scored) Mashnev; (penalty scored) Makarchuk; (penalty scored) Gordiyenko; (penalty missed) Bazhev

== Round of 32 ==
Teams from the Premier League entered the competition at this round. The matches were played on 20 and 21 September 2017.

20 September 2017	Luch-Energiya Vladivostok (2)	2–0	Anzhi Makhachkala (1)	Vladivostok
19:00 VLAT (UTC+10)	Gordiyenko 20'; Malyaka 68'	Report		Stadium: Dynamo Stadium; Attendance: 1,950; Referee: Anton Anopa

20 September 2017	Orenburg (2)	0–2	Rubin Kazan (1)	Orenburg
17:00 YEKT (UTC+5)		Report	Sorokin 29'; Lestienne 90+4'	Stadium: Gazovik Stadium; Attendance: 4,284; Referee: Aleksei Matyunin

20 September 2017	Shinnik Yaroslavl (2)	3–0	Ural Yekaterinburg (1)	Karavaevo
15:00 MSK (UTC+3)	Fatikhov 8'; Bezlikhotnov 44'; Kramarenko 56'	Report		Stadium: Stadion Urozhay; Attendance: 1,500; Referee: Igor Panin

20 September 2017	Tambov (2)	1–0	Arsenal Tula (1)	Tambov
15:00 MSK (UTC+3)	Skvortsov 90'	Report		Stadium: Spartak Stadium; Attendance: 4,500; Referee: Nikolay Voloshin

20 September 2017	Tom Tomsk (2)	2–1	Krasnodar (1)	Tomsk
19:00 KRAT (UTC+7)	Sobolev 45', 45'	Report	Mamayev 32' (pen.)	Stadium: Trud Stadium; Attendance: 2,300; Referee: Igor Fedotov

20 September 2017	Avangard Kursk (2)	1–0 (a.e.t.)	CSKA Moscow (1)	Kursk
17:00 MSK (UTC+3)	Korobov 114' (pen.)	Report		Stadium: Trudovye Rezervy Stadium; Attendance: 11,029; Referee: Sergey Kulikov

20 September 2017	Tyumen (2)	1–2	Tosno (1)	Tyumen
19:00 YEKT (UTC+5)	Karpov 48'	Report	Paliyenko 34', 38'	Stadium: Geolog Stadium; Attendance: 2,800; Referee: Sergey Ivanov

20 September 2017	Volgar Astrakhan (2)	0–2	Rostov (1)	Astrakhan
19:00 SAMT (UTC+4)		Report	Zuyev 22'; Bukharov 48'	Stadium: Central Stadium; Attendance: 6,000; Referee: Aleksey Sukhoy

20 September 2017	Spartak Nalchik (3)	0–0 (a.e.t.) (4–2 p)	Dynamo Moscow (1)	Nalchik
18:30 MSK (UTC+3)		Report		Stadium: Spartak Stadium; Attendance: 3,000; Referee: Ivan Sidenkov
	Penalties
	Khalid Shakhtiyev (penalty scored); Abazov (penalty scored); Mashukov (penalty scored); Pashtov (penalty scored)		Katrich (penalty missed); Lutsenko (penalty scored); Sapeta (penalty scored); Obolsky (penalty missed)

20 September 2017	Kuban Krasnodar (2)	0–2	Spartak Moscow (1)	Krasnodar
19:00 MSK (UTC+3)		Report	Promes 45+1', 52'	Stadium: Kuban Stadium; Attendance: 12,728; Referee: Evgeny Turbin

21 September 2017	Yenisey Krasnoyarsk (2)	3–0	Akhmat Grozny (1)	Krasnoyarsk
19:00 KRAT (UTC+7)	Chicherin 35'; Kutyin 52'; Isayev 70'	Report		Stadium: Central Stadium; Attendance: 3,000; Referee: Stanislav Vasilyev

21 September 2017	Olimpiyets Nizhny Novgorod (2)	1–1 (a.e.t.) (4–1 p)	Ufa (1)	Nizhny Novgorod
18:00 MSK (UTC+3)	Malyarov 57'	Report	Abdulavov 90+2'	Stadium: Lokomotiv Stadium; Attendance: 1,500; Referee: Lasha Verulidze
	Penalties
	Belyakov (penalty scored); Fomin (penalty scored); Ayupov (penalty scored); Anisimov (penalty scored)		Tumasyan (penalty missed); Salatić (penalty missed); Oblyakov (penalty scored)

21 September 2017	Krylia Sovetov (2)	3–2 (a.e.t.)	Lokomotiv Moscow (1)	Samara
19:30 SAMT (UTC+4)	Bashkirov 51'; Pejčinović 84' (o.g.); Klenkin 108'	Report	Al. Miranchuk 76'; Kvirkvelia 90+2'	Stadium: Metallurg Stadium; Attendance: 9,271; Referee: Artem Chistyakov

21 September 2017	Ararat Moscow (3)	1–2	SKA Khabarovsk (1)	Moscow
19:00 MSK (UTC+3)	Zemchenkov 48'	Report	Tarakanov 67' (o.g.); Kalinsky 80'	Stadium: Spartakovets Stadium; Attendance: 700; Referee: Dmitry Nedvizhay

21 September 2017	Fakel Voronezh (2)	0–4	Amkar Perm (1)	Voronezh
19:00 MSK (UTC+3)		Report	Prokofyev 7', 82'; Sivakow 63'; Ryazantsev 76'	Stadium: Trade Unions Central Stadium; Attendance: 6,100; Referee: Aleksandr Borisov

21 September 2017	Dynamo Saint Petersburg (2)	3–2 (a.e.t.)	Zenit Saint Petersburg (1)	Saint Petersburg
20:00 MSK (UTC+3)	Kulishev 37', 111' (pen.); Barsov 43'	Report	Paredes 60'; Poloz 62'	Stadium: Krestovsky Stadium; Attendance: 37,123; Referee: Pavel Kukuyan

== Round of 16 ==
The matches were played on 25 October 2017.

25 October 2017	SKA-Khabarovsk (1)	2–0	Dynamo Saint Petersburg (2)	Khabarovsk
	Navalovski 61'; Marković 72'	Report		Stadium: Lenin Stadium; Attendance: 4,257; Referee: Oleg Sokolov

25 October 2017	Luch-Energiya Vladivostok (2)	2–1	Yenisey Krasnoyarsk (2)	Vladivostok
	Ponomarenko 19'; Kilin 71'	Report	Kamešs 56'	Stadium: Dynamo Stadium; Attendance: 1,050; Referee: Anton Anopa

25 October 2017	Tambov (2)	0–2	Avangard Kursk (2)	Tambov
		Report	Skvortsov 59' (o.g.); Fedchuk 85'	Stadium: Spartak Stadium; Attendance: 3,550; Referee: Artyom Lyubimov

25 October 2017	Shinnik Yaroslavl (2)	4–0	Olimpiyets Nizhny Novgorod (2)	Karavaevo
	Chistyakov 20'; Kramarenko 24'; Lyakh 47'; Kagermazov 70'	Report		Stadium: Stadion Urozhay; Attendance: 500; Referee: Alexandr Borisov

25 October 2017	Rostov (1)	1–1 (a.e.t.) (9–10 p)	Amkar Perm (1)	Rostov-on-Don
	Parshivlyuk 39'	Report	Idowu 16'	Stadium: Olimp-2; Attendance: 4,827; Referee: Aleksei Suhoy
	Penalties
	Shomurodov (penalty scored); Bukharov (penalty scored); Doumbia (penalty missed); Ingason (penalty scored); Gațcan (penalty missed); Majer (penalty scored); Parshivlyuk (penalty scored); Makeyev (penalty scored); Wilusz (penalty scored); Ustinov (penalty scored); Pesyakov (penalty scored); Shomurodov (penalty missed)		Bodul (penalty missed); Balanovich (penalty scored); Melnikov (penalty scored); Prokofyev (penalty missed); Sivakow (penalty scored); Ogude (penalty scored); Belorukov (penalty scored); Condé (penalty scored); Zaytsev (penalty scored); Miljković (penalty scored); Nigmatullin (penalty scored); Bodul (penalty scored)

25 October 2017	Spartak Moscow (1)	5–2	Spartak Nalchik (3)	Moscow
	Pašalić 30'; Melgarejo 48', 52'; Zhilov 81' (o.g.); Kutepov 89'	Report	Mednikov 19'; Guguyev 58'	Stadium: Otkrytiye Arena; Attendance: 16,552; Referee: Nikolay Voloshin

25 October 2017	Rubin Kazan (1)	1–2	Krylia Sovetov Samara (2)	Kazan
	Zhemaletdinov 59'	Report	Kornilenko 33'; Aliyev 55'	Stadium: Kazan Arena; Attendance: 3,411; Referee: Igor Fedotov

25 October 2017	Tosno (1)	0–0 (a.e.t.) (6–5 p)	Tom Tomsk (2)	Saint Petersburg
		Report		Stadium: Petrovsky Stadium; Attendance: 1,248; Referee: Sergey Ivanov
	Penalties
	Dugalić (penalty scored); Markov (penalty scored); Shakhov (penalty scored); Trujić (penalty scored); Nuno Rocha (penalty missed); Sukharev (penalty scored); Mirzov (penalty scored)		Mikuckis (penalty scored); Girdvainis (penalty scored); Sobolev (penalty missed); Zuykov (penalty scored); Puljić (penalty scored); Pomerko (penalty scored); Kudryashov (penalty missed)

== Quarter-finals ==
The matches were played on 27 February, 28 February and 4 April 2018.

27 February 2018	SKA-Khabarovsk (1)	0–0 (a.e.t.) (1–4 p)	Shinnik Yaroslavl (2)	Khabarovsk
		Report		Stadium: Lenin Stadium; Attendance: 2,405; Referee: Evgeny Turbin
	Penalties
	Samsonov (penalty scored); Kalinsky (penalty missed); Marković (penalty missed)		(penalty scored) Bezlikhotnov; (penalty scored) Nizamutdinov; (penalty scored) Shaymordanov; (penalty scored) Kamilov

27 February 2018	Amkar Perm (1)	0–0 (a.e.t.) (6–7 p)	Avangard Kursk (2)	Perm
		Report		Stadium: Zvezda Stadium; Attendance: 2,000; Referee: Kirill Levnikov
	Penalties
	Zanev (penalty scored); Gashchenkov (penalty scored); Sivakow (penalty missed); Bodul (penalty scored); Nigmatullin (penalty scored); Komolov (penalty missed); Olanare (penalty scored); Balanovich (penalty scored); Idowu (penalty missed)		(penalty scored) Korobov; (penalty missed) Gotsuk; (penalty scored) Dashayev; (penalty scored) Sinyayev; (penalty scored) Gurfov; (penalty missed) Nikitin; (penalty scored) Mitasov; (penalty scored) Netfullin; (penalty scored) Tlupov

28 February 2018	Tosno (1)	2–1	Luch-Energiya Vladivostok (2)	Saint Petersburg
	Buivolov 23'; Pogrebnyak 27'	Report	Myazin 52'	Stadium: Petrovsky Stadium; Attendance: 300; Referee: Aleksei Matyunin

4 April 2018	Krylia Sovetov Samara (2)	1–3	Spartak Moscow (1)	Samara
	Sobolev 90+2'	Report	Zé Luís 20'; Promes 71'; Luiz Adriano 77'	Stadium: Metallurg Stadium; Attendance: 15,833; Referee: Vladimir Moskalyov
Note: The match was originally scheduled for 28 February 2018 but it was rescheduled to 4 April 2018 due to cold weather.

== Semi-finals ==
The matches were played on 18 April 2018.

18 April 2018	Avangard Kursk (2)	1–0	Shinnik Yaroslavl (2)	Kursk
	Kireyev 79'	Report		Stadium: Trudovye Rezervy Stadium; Attendance: 10,500; Referee: Igor Fedotov

18 April 2018	Spartak Moscow (1)	1–1 (a.e.t.) (4–5 p)	Tosno (1)	Moscow
	Zé Luís 62'	Report	Galiulin 89'	Stadium: Otkrytiye Arena; Attendance: 22,335; Referee: Roman Galimov
	Penalties
	Luiz Adriano (penalty scored); D. Kombarov (penalty scored); Fernando (penalty missed); Zé Luís (penalty scored); Promes (penalty scored); Glushakov (penalty missed)		Dugalić (penalty missed); Galiulin (penalty scored); Trujić (penalty scored); Zhigulyov (penalty scored); Buivolov (penalty scored); Nuno Rocha (penalty scored)

== Final ==
9 May 2018
19:00 (UTC+2)

Tosno (1)	2–1	Avangard Kursk (2)
Skvortsov 10'; Mirzov 80'	Report	Kireyev 16'

Volgograd Arena, Volgograd
Attendance: 40,373
Referee: Sergei Karasev
