= 2017–18 Russian Professional Football League =

Russian Professional Football League
- Season: 2017–18

The 2017–18 Professional Football League was the third highest division in Russian football. The Professional Football League is geographically divided into 5 zones. The winners of each zone are automatically promoted into the National Football League. The bottom finishers of each zone lose professional status and are relegated into the Amateur Football League.

== West ==
=== Standings ===
Pos	Team	Pld	W	D	L	GF	GA	GD	Pts	Promotion or relegation
1	Chertanovo Moscow	26	19	4	3	52	15	+37	61	Promotion to Russian National Football League
2	Tekstilshchik Ivanovo	26	16	6	4	49	20	+29	54	
3	Lokomotiv-Kazanka Moscow	26	16	4	6	50	23	+27	52	
4	Veles Moscow	26	14	4	8	46	32	+14	46	
5	Spartak Kostroma	26	12	7	7	34	26	+8	43	
6	Dolgoprudny	26	11	10	5	49	27	+22	43	
7	Pskov-747 Pskov	26	11	4	11	30	36	−6	37	
8	Torpedo Vladimir	26	10	6	10	38	34	+4	36	
9	Murom	26	8	8	10	24	28	−4	32	
10	Dynamo-2 Saint Petersburg	26	8	8	10	29	35	−6	32	
11	Luki-Energiya Velikiye Luki	26	7	7	12	19	23	−4	28	
12	CRFSO Smolensk	26	7	4	15	26	40	−14	25	
13	Kolomna	26	5	1	20	18	59	−41	16	
14	Znamya Truda Orekhovo-Zuyevo (R)	26	1	1	24	12	78	−66	4	Relegation to Amateur Football League

Rules for classification: 1. points won; 2. games won; 3. points in head-to-head matches; 4. games won in head-to-head matches; 5. goal difference in head-to-head matches; 6. goals scored in head-to-head matches; 7. away goals in head-to-head matches; 8. total goal difference; 9. total goals scored; 10. total away goals scored.
(R) Relegated

=== Top scorers ===
Rank	Player	Club	Goals
1	(Russia) Anton Zinkovskiy	Chertanovo	18
2	(Russia) Roman Tugarev	Kazanka	13
3	(Russia) Aleksei Bayev	Torpedo Vladimir	11
3	(Russia) Aleksei Trinitatskiy	Dolgoprudny	11
5	(Russia) Artyom Galadzhan	Kazanka	10
5	(Russia) Anton Shishayev	Pskov-747	10
7	(Russia) Nikita Bazhenov	Dolgoprudny	9
7	(Russia) Ilya Zinin	Torpedo Vladimir	9
9	(Russia) Maksim Glushenkov	Chertanovo	8
9	(Russia) Yevgeni Popov	Tekstilshchik	8
9	(Russia) Aleksey Rogov	Dolgoprudny	8
9	(Russia) Aleksandr Shchanitsyn	Tekstilshchik	8
9	(Russia) Vladislav Sarveli	Chertanovo	8

== Centre ==
=== Standings ===
Pos	Team	Pld	W	D	L	GF	GA	GD	Pts	Promotion or relegation
1	Ararat Moscow	26	19	6	1	52	17	+35	63	Dissolved after season
2	Energomash Belgorod	26	15	8	3	45	20	+25	53	Dissolved after season
3	Ryazan	26	14	4	8	37	23	+14	46	
4	Zorky Krasnogorsk	26	13	4	9	42	26	+16	43	
5	Metallurg Lipetsk	26	12	7	7	34	34	0	43	
6	Torpedo Moscow	26	11	9	6	44	22	+22	42	
7	Sokol Saratov	26	11	6	9	36	38	−2	39	
8	Saturn Ramenskoye	26	10	7	9	37	34	+3	37	
9	Strogino Moscow	26	11	3	12	38	37	+1	36	
10	Dynamo Bryansk	26	10	4	12	33	29	+4	34	
11	Khimik Novomoskovsk	26	9	4	13	31	35	−4	31	
12	Kaluga	26	5	6	15	20	37	−17	21	
13	Rotor-2 Volgograd	26	3	2	21	19	51	−32	11	
14	Zenit Penza	26	3	2	21	12	77	−65	11	Relegation to Amateur Football League

Rules for classification: 1. points won; 2. games won; 3. points in head-to-head matches; 4. games won in head-to-head matches; 5. goal difference in head-to-head matches; 6. goals scored in head-to-head matches; 7. away goals in head-to-head matches; 8. total goal difference; 9. total goals scored; 10. total away goals scored.

=== Top scorers ===
Rank	Player	Club	Goals
1	(Russia) Ivan Sergeyev	Strogino Moscow	16
2	(Russia) Ruslan Akhvlediani	Metallurg Lipetsk	10
2	(Russia) Vasili Pavlov	Zorky Krasnogorsk	10
2	(Azerbaijan) Rahim Sadykhov	Torpedo Moscow	10
2	(Russia) Yuri Andreychenko	Khimik Novomoskovsk	10
2	(Russia) Yevgeni Dudikov	Sokol Saratov	10
7	(Russia) Roman Pavlyuchenko	Ararat Moscow	9
7	(Russia) Nikita Dubchak	Zorky Krasnogorsk	9
9	(Russia) Sergey Tsyganov	Zorky Krasnogorsk	8
9	(Russia) Yevgeni Marichev	Ryazan	8

== South ==
=== Standings ===
Pos	Team	Pld	W	D	L	GF	GA	GD	Pts	Promotion or relegation
1	Armavir	32	24	7	1	70	16	+54	79	Promotion to Russian National Football League
2	Afips Afipsky	32	24	6	2	70	15	+55	78	Dissolved after season
3	Chayka Peschanokopskoye	32	17	7	8	51	25	+26	58	
4	Krasnodar-2	32	16	6	10	58	37	+21	54	Promotion to Russian National Football League
5	Chernomorets Novorossiysk	32	15	6	11	45	27	+18	51	
6	Druzhba Maykop	32	15	5	12	36	45	−9	50	
7	Spartak Nalchik	32	11	11	10	36	27	+9	44	
8	SKA Rostov-on-Don	32	12	8	12	40	38	+2	44	
9	Legion-Dynamo Makhachkala	32	11	10	11	32	29	+3	43	
10	Akademiya Futbola Rostov	32	12	6	14	26	44	−18	42	
11	Mashuk-KMV Pyatigorsk	32	10	8	14	27	32	−5	38	
12	Biolog-Novokubansk	32	9	7	16	28	44	−16	34	
13	Spartak Vladikavkaz	32	8	8	16	26	41	−15	32	
14	Dynamo Stavropol	32	8	7	17	39	69	−30	31	
15	Angusht Nazran	32	7	7	18	29	56	−27	28	
16	Anzhi-2 Makhachkala	32	6	7	19	26	52	−26	25	
17	Kuban-2 Krasnodar	32	7	4	21	25	69	−44	25	Relegation to Amateur Football League

Rules for classification: 1. points won; 2. games won; 3. points in head-to-head matches; 4. games won in head-to-head matches; 5. goal difference in head-to-head matches; 6. goals scored in head-to-head matches; 7. away goals in head-to-head matches; 8. total goal difference; 9. total goals scored; 10. total away goals scored.

=== Top scorers ===
Rank	Player	Club	Goals
1	(Russia) Artyom Gevorkyan	Afips Afipsky	17
2	(Russia) Ilya Belous	Afips Afipsky/Krasnodar-2	15
3	(Russia) Aleksandr Podbeltsev	Afips Afipsky	13
3	(Russia) Sergei Miroshnichenko	Armavir	13
5	(Russia) Amir Mokhammad	Legion Dynamo Makhachkala	11
5	(Russia) Semyon Sinyavsky	Armavir	11
7	(Russia) Vladislav Rudenko	Chayka Peschanokopskoye	10
7	(Russia) Amur Kalmykov	Anzhi-2 Makhachkala/Afips Afipsky	10
9	(Russia) Yuri Dmitriyenko	Biolog-Novokubansk	9
9	(Russia) Maksim Obozny	Chayka Peschanokopskoye	9
9	(Russia) Sergei Serdyukov	Dynamo Stavropol	9
9	(Russia) Islam Tlupov	Spartak Nalchik	9

== Ural-Povolzhye ==
=== Standings ===
Pos	Team	Pld	W	D	L	GF	GA	GD	Pts	Promotion or relegation
1	Mordovia Saransk	24	17	5	2	38	8	+30	56	Promotion to Russian National Football League
2	Chelyabinsk	24	14	7	3	41	19	+22	49	
3	Syzran-2003	24	14	4	6	35	22	+13	46	
4	KAMAZ Naberezhnye Chelny	24	13	6	5	37	19	+18	45	
5	Zenit-Izhevsk	24	13	3	8	28	17	+11	42	
6	Neftekhimik Nizhnekamsk	24	12	6	6	42	21	+21	42	
7	Volga Ulyanovsk	24	12	5	7	33	17	+16	41	
8	Nosta Novotroitsk	24	10	6	8	40	30	+10	36	
9	Lada-Togliatti	24	8	1	15	25	51	−26	25	
10	Ural-2 Yekaterinburg	24	5	2	17	19	33	−14	17	
11	Anzhi-Yunior Zelenodolsk (R)	24	4	4	16	18	44	−26	16	Relegation to Amateur Football League
12	Orenburg-2	24	2	7	15	15	45	−30	13	
13	Krylia Sovetov-2 Samara	24	3	2	19	15	63	−48	11	Relegation to Amateur Football League

Rules for classification: 1. points won; 2. games won; 3. points in head-to-head matches; 4. games won in head-to-head matches; 5. goal difference in head-to-head matches; 6. goals scored in head-to-head matches; 7. away goals in head-to-head matches; 8. total goal difference; 9. total goals scored; 10. total away goals scored.
(R) Relegated

=== Top scorers ===
Rank	Player	Club	Goals
1	(Russia) Sergei Ignatyev	Chelyabinsk	12
1	(Russia) Ruslan Mukhametshin	Mordovia Saransk	12
3	(Azerbaijan) Rizvan Umarov	Neftekhimik Nizhnekamsk	11
4	(Russia) Ruslan Galiakberov	Syzran-2003/KAMAZ Naberezhnye Chelny	10
5	(Russia) Denis Uryvkov	Chelyabinsk	8
6	(Russia) Aznaur Geryugov	Lada-Tolyatti	7
6	(Russia) Maksim Malakhovskiy	Zenit-Izhevsk	7
8	(Russia) Artur Gilyazetdinov	Anzhi-Yunior Zelenodolsk/Neftekhimik Nizhnekamsk	6
8	(Russia) Andrei Yegorychev	Nosta Novotroitsk/Ural-2 Yekaterinburg	6
8	(Russia) Dmitri Otstavnov	Volga Ulyanovsk	6
8	(Russia) Merabi Uridia	Neftekhimik Nizhnekamsk	6
8	(Russia) David Khubayev	KAMAZ Naberezhnye Chelny	6
8	(Russia) Aleksandr Krendelev	Mordovia Saransk	6

== East ==
=== Standings ===
Pos	Team	Pld	W	D	L	GF	GA	GD	Pts	Qualification
1	Sakhalin Yuzhno-Sakhalinsk	20	14	0	6	37	17	+20	42	Refused promotion to Russian National Football League
2	Smena Komsomolsk-na-Amure	20	10	3	7	24	20	+4	33	
3	Dynamo Barnaul	20	7	8	5	18	18	0	29	
4	Chita	20	6	9	5	20	16	+4	27	
5	Zenit Irkutsk	20	6	4	10	22	34	−12	22	
6	Irtysh Omsk	20	4	4	12	15	31	−16	16	

Rules for classification: 1. points won; 2. games won; 3. points in head-to-head matches; 4. games won in head-to-head matches; 5. goal difference in head-to-head matches; 6. goals scored in head-to-head matches; 7. away goals in head-to-head matches; 8. total goal difference; 9. total goals scored; 10. total away goals scored.

=== Top scorers ===
Rank	Player	Club	Goals
1	(Russia) Aleksandr Gagloyev	Sakhalin Yuzhno-Sakhalinsk	13
2	(Russia) Ivan Yakovlev	Zenit Irkutsk	10
3	(Russia) Ilya Yurchenko	Smena Komsomolsk-na-Amure	8
4	(Russia) Andrei Razborov	Chita	6
5	(Russia) Vladislav Aksyutenko	Dynamo Barnaul	5
5	(Russia) Yuri Kolomyts	Sakhalin Yuzhno-Sakhalinsk	5
