= Chyorny (inhabited locality) =

Chyorny/Cherny (Russian: Чёрный; masculine), Chyornaya/Chernaya (Чёрная; feminine), or Chyornoye/Chernoye (Чёрное; neuter) is the name of several rural localities in Russia.

== Ivanovo Oblast ==
As of 2010, one rural locality in Ivanovo Oblast bears this name:

- Chyornaya, Ivanovo Oblast, a village in Kineshemsky District

== Kaluga Oblast ==
As of 2010, two rural localities in Kaluga Oblast bear this name:

- Chyornaya, Kirovsky District, Kaluga Oblast, a village in Kirovsky District
- Chyornaya, Kuybyshevsky District, Kaluga Oblast, a village in Kuybyshevsky District

== Kirov Oblast ==
As of 2010, one rural locality in Kirov Oblast bears this name:

- Chyornaya, Kirov Oblast, a station in Pokrovsky Rural Okrug of Kotelnichsky District

== Kostroma Oblast ==
As of 2010, one rural locality in Kostroma Oblast bears this name:

- Chyornaya, Kostroma Oblast, a village in Klevantsovskoye Settlement of Ostrovsky District

== Krasnodar Krai ==
As of 2010, one rural locality in Krasnodar Krai bears this name:

- Chyorny (rural locality), a khutor in Pervomaysky Rural Okrug of Anapsky District

== Leningrad Oblast ==
As of 2010, two rural localities in Leningrad Oblast bear this name:

- Chyornoye, Kirovsky District, Leningrad Oblast, a village in Sukhovskoye Settlement Municipal Formation of Kirovsky District
- Chyornoye, Volosovsky District, Leningrad Oblast, a village in Izvarskoye Settlement Municipal Formation of Volosovsky District

== Moscow Oblast ==
As of 2010, two rural localities in Moscow Oblast bear this name:

- Chyornoye, Moscow Oblast, a village under the administrative jurisdiction of Balashikha City Under Oblast Jurisdiction
- Chyornaya, Moscow Oblast, a village in Pavlo-Slobodskoye Rural Settlement of Istrinsky District

== Nenets Autonomous Okrug ==
As of 2010, one rural locality in Nenets Autonomous Okrug bears this name:

- Chyornaya, Nenets Autonomous Okrug, a village in Primorsko-Kuysky Selsoviet of Zapolyarny District

== Nizhny Novgorod Oblast ==
As of 2010, five rural localities in Nizhny Novgorod Oblast bear this name:

- Chyornoye, Shakhunya, Nizhny Novgorod Oblast, a selo in Luzhaysky Selsoviet of the town of oblast significance of Shakhunya
- Chyornoye, Urensky District, Nizhny Novgorod Oblast, a selo in Mineyevsky Selsoviet of Urensky District
- Chyornaya, Vyksa, Nizhny Novgorod Oblast, a village in Novodmitriyevsky Selsoviet of the town of oblast significance of Vyksa
- Chyornaya, Shakhunya, Nizhny Novgorod Oblast, a village in Tumaninsky Selsoviet of the town of oblast significance of Shakhunya
- Chyornaya, Balakhninsky District, Nizhny Novgorod Oblast, a village in Kocherginsky Selsoviet of Balakhninsky District

== Novgorod Oblast ==
As of 2010, three rural localities in Novgorod Oblast bear this name:

- Chyornoye, Batetsky District, Novgorod Oblast, a village in Moykinskoye Settlement of Batetsky District
- Chyornoye, Pestovsky District, Novgorod Oblast, a village in Laptevskoye Settlement of Pestovsky District
- Chyornaya, Novgorod Oblast, a village in Batetskoye Settlement of Batetsky District

== Oryol Oblast ==
As of 2010, one rural locality in Oryol Oblast bears this name:

- Chyornoye, Oryol Oblast, a selo in Znamensky Selsoviet of Znamensky District

== Perm Krai ==
As of 2010, six rural localities in Perm Krai bear this name:

- Chyornoye, Perm Krai, a settlement in Solikamsky District
- Chyornaya, Krasnokamsk, Perm Krai, a selo under the administrative jurisdiction of the town of krai significance of Krasnokamsk
- Chyornaya, Karagaysky District, Perm Krai, a village in Karagaysky District
- Chyornaya, Ochyorsky District, Perm Krai, a village in Ochyorsky District
- Chyornaya, Permsky District, Perm Krai, a village in Permsky District
- Chyornaya, Yurlinsky District, Perm Krai, a village in Yurlinsky District

== Ryazan Oblast ==
As of 2010, one rural locality in Ryazan Oblast bears this name:

- Chyornoye, Ryazan Oblast, a village in Belovsky Rural Okrug of Klepikovsky District

== Smolensk Oblast ==
As of 2010, one rural locality in Smolensk Oblast bears this name:

- Chyornoye, Smolensk Oblast, a village in Otnosovskoye Rural Settlement of Vyazemsky District

== Tver Oblast ==
As of 2010, one rural locality in Tver Oblast bears this name:

- Chyornaya, Tver Oblast, a village in Krasnokholmsky District

== Tyumen Oblast ==
As of 2010, two rural localities in Tyumen Oblast bear this name:

- Chyornoye, Tyumen Oblast, a selo in Chernokovsky Rural Okrug of Vagaysky District
- Chyornaya, Tyumen Oblast, a village in Chernakovsky Rural Okrug of Uporovsky District

== Udmurt Republic ==
As of 2010, one rural locality in the Udmurt Republic bears this name:

- Chyornaya, Udmurt Republic, a village in Svetlyansky Selsoviet of Votkinsky District

== Vologda Oblast ==
As of 2010, four rural localities in Vologda Oblast bear this name:

- Chyornaya, Kichmengsko-Gorodetsky District, Vologda Oblast, a village in Shongsky Selsoviet of Kichmengsko-Gorodetsky District
- Chyornaya, Nikolsky District, Vologda Oblast, a village in Argunovsky Selsoviet of Nikolsky District
- Chyornaya, Ustyuzhensky District, Vologda Oblast, a village in Soshnevsky Selsoviet of Ustyuzhensky District
- Chyornaya, Velikoustyugsky District, Vologda Oblast, a village in Shemogodsky Selsoviet of Velikoustyugsky District

== Yaroslavl Oblast ==
As of 2010, one rural locality in Yaroslavl Oblast bears this name:

- Chyornaya, Yaroslavl Oblast, a village in Kuzovkovsky Rural Okrug of Gavrilov-Yamsky District
