= Yevgeni Kiselnikov =

Russian footballer

Personal information
- Full name: Yevgeni Yegorovich Kiselnikov
- Date of birth: 24 May 1962 (age 64)
- Height: 1.87 m (6 ft 1 1/2 in)
- Position: Goalkeeper

Youth career
- FC Rubin Omsk

Senior career*
Years	Team	Apps	(Gls)
1980–1984	FC Irtysh Omsk	31	(0)
1986–1992	FC Irtysh Omsk	163	(0)
1992–1993	FC Dynamo-Gazovik Tyumen	22	(0)
1994–1997	FC Irtysh Omsk	32	(0)
2001	SK ZhDV Irtysh Omsk		
- * Club domestic league appearances and goals

Yevgeni Yegorovich Kiselnikov (Russian: Евгений Егорович Кисельников; born 24 May 1962) is a former Russian football player.
