= Chyorny =

Chyorny/Cherny (masculine), Chyornaya/Chernaya (feminine), or Chyornoye/Chernoye (neuter) may refer to:

- Chyorny (surname)
- Chyorny (inhabited locality) (Chyornaya, Chyornoye), name of several rural localities in Russia
- Chorny Volcano, a stratovolcano in Kamchatka Krai, Russia
- Chyornaya (Crimea), a river in Crimea, Ukraine, also known as the Chorhun, Chornaya or Tchornaya River
- Chyornaya (Veslyana), a tributary of the Veslyana in Perm Krai and Komi Republic, Russia
- Chyornaya Rechka (Saint Petersburg), a small river in Saint Petersburg, also known as the Black River, famous for being the place of the duel of Alexander Pushkin and Georges d'Anthès
- Chyornaya (Shilka tributary)

== See also ==
- Chorny, Ukrainian last name
- ru:Чёрная
- ru:Чёрное
- ru:Чёрный (значения)
