= Chyorny (surname) =

Chyorny (Russian: Чёрный), feminine: Chyornaya is an Ruassian surname literally meaning "black". It may also transliterated as Cherny. Notable people with the surname include:

- Aleksandr Pankratov-Chyorny, Russian actor and film director
- Artur Chyorny, Russian football player
- Daniil Chyorny (c. 1360–1430), Russian icon painter
- Vadim Chyorny (born 1997), Russian football player

== See also ==
- Chyorny (disambiguation)
