= Aleksandr Zaikin =

Aleksandr Zaikin may refer to:

- Aleksandr Vladimirovich Zaikin (b. 1988), Russian footballer
- Aleksandr Yevgenyevich Zaikin (b. 1974), Russian footballer
