= Olga Yeryomina =

Russian author and poet

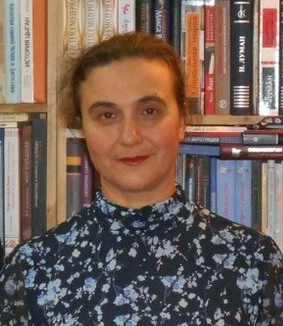
- Born: Zarechnyy
- Alma mater: Kaluga State University
- Occupation: Writer, philologist, tour guide, poet, man of letters, methodologist
- Awards: ABS Prize (2017)

Olga Aleksandrovna Yeryomina (Russian: Ольга Александровна Ерёмина; born 1970) is a Russian author and poet, philologist. She is a biographer of Ivan Yefremov. She is the author of a book about Yefremov. Her book "Ivan Yefremov" (2013) was published in the ZhZL series. Yeryomina is a winner of the ABS Prize (2017).

She graduated from Kaluga State University in 1993.

She has three children.

== Publications ==
She is also the author of historical novels.

Year	Title
2001	Струны
2013	Ivan Yefremov
2018	Сказание об Иргень
2024	Котёл Господень (dilogy)
2024	Дикая карта

She was criticized by Dmitri Chorny.
