= Aleksandr Kerbs =

Russian footballer

Personal information
- Full name: Aleksandr Aleksandrovich Kerbs
- Date of birth: 12 September 1993 (age 33)
- Place of birth: Omsk, Russia
- Height: 1.85 m (6 ft 1 in)
- Position: Defender

Senior career*
Years	Team	Apps	(Gls)
2014–2022	FC Irtysh Omsk	129	(4)
2023	FC Irtysh Omsk	0	(0)
- * Club domestic league appearances and goals

Aleksandr Aleksandrovich Kerbs (Russian: Александр Александрович Кербс; born 12 September 1993) is a Russian former football player.

== Club career ==
He made his debut in the Russian Football National League for FC Irtysh Omsk on 12 August 2020 in a game against FC Chertanovo Moscow.
