= Chorny =

Chorny (Ukrainian: Чорний) is a surname derived from East Slavic word meaning "black" (Чёрный/Чорний/Чорны).It may also transiterated as Chornyi. Notable people with the surname include:

- Daniel Chorny
- Dmitri Chorny
- Hryhoriy Chorny
- Mikhail Chorny
- Glen Chorny
- Sasha Chorny (1880–1932), Russian poet
- Joseph Judah Chorny

== See also ==
- Chyorny (disambiguation)
