= FC Irtysh (disambiguation) =

FC Irtysh is the name of following football clubs: (named after Irtysh river, which flows in Kazakhstan, Russia and China)

- Irtysh Pavlodar, a Kazakh football club, playing in the Kazakhstan Premier League
- Irtysh Omsk, a Russian football club, playing in the Russian Second Division
- Irtysh Tobolsk, a Russian football club, played in the Russian Second Division
