= Sergei Gavrilov =

Sergei Gavrilov may refer to:

- Sergei Gavrilov (politician) (born 1966), Russian politician
- Sergei Gavrilov (footballer) (born 1987), Russian footballer
