= Ilya Baulchev =

Russian footballer

Personal information
- Full name: Ilya Yuryevich Baulchev
- Date of birth: 2 October 1988 (age 38)
- Place of birth: Voronezh, Russia
- Height: 1.82 m (6 ft 0 in)
- Position: Defender

Youth career
- DYuSShOR-15 Voronezh

Senior career*
| Years | Team | Apps | (Gls) |
| 2007–2016 | FC Lokomotiv Liski | 164 | (3) |
| 2014 | → FC Vybor-Kurbatovo Voronezh (loan) | 17 | (1) |
| 2016–2017 | FC Ryazan | 17 | (0) |
| 2017–2021 | FC Metallurg Lipetsk | 62 | (0) |
- * Club domestic league appearances and goals

Ilya Yuryevich Baulchev (Russian: Илья Юрьевич Баульчев; born 2 October 1988) is a Russian former football player.

== Club career ==
He made his debut in the Russian Football National League for FC Metallurg Lipetsk on 17 July 2021 in a game against FC Orenburg.
