= Ruslan Magal =

Russian footballer

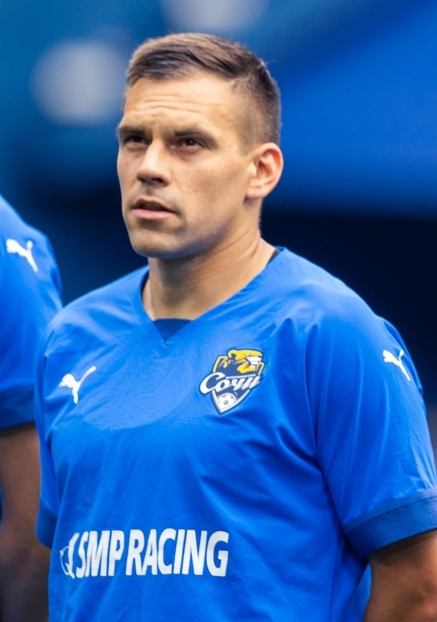
- Magal with Sochi in 2024

Personal information
- Full name: Ruslan Ivanovich Magal
- Date of birth: 24 September 1991 (age 35)
- Place of birth: Voronezh, Russian SFSR
- Height: 1.72 m (5 ft 8 in)
- Positions: Right-back; right midfielder

Team information
- Current team: Sochi
- Number: 28

Youth career
- Kristall Voronezh

Senior career*
Years	Team	Apps	(Gls)
2009	FSA Voronezh	0	(0)
2009	Magnit Zheleznogorsk (amateur)	6	(0)
2010	Fakel-M Voronezh (amateur)	20	(1)
2011	Don-Podgornoye (amateur)		
2011–2012	Yelets (amateur)		
2013	Donenergo Aksay (amateur)		
2013–2014	Vybor-Kurbatovo Voronezh (amateur)		
2014	Vybor-Kurbatovo Voronezh	13	(0)
2015	Sochi	10	(2)
2015–2017	Sibir Novosibirsk	84	(4)
2018–2019	Baltika Kaliningrad	43	(4)
2019–2021	Torpedo Moscow	63	(1)
2021–2024	Fakel Voronezh	86	(2)
2024–	Sochi	47	(4)
- * Club domestic league appearances and goals as of 17 May 2026

Ruslan Ivanovich Magal (Russian: Руслан Иванович Магаль; born 24 September 1991) is a Russian football player who plays for Sochi. He mostly plays in the right-back or right midfielder position, but is also deployed on the left.

== Club career ==
He made his professional debut in the Russian Professional Football League for Vybor-Kurbatovo Voronezh on 12 July 2014 in a game against Tambov.

He made his Russian Football National League debut for Sibir Novosibirsk on 11 July 2015 in a game against Volgar Astrakhan.

Magal made his Russian Premier League debut for Fakel Voronezh on 17 July 2022 against Krasnodar.

On 28 May 2024, Magal left Fakel as his contract expired.

== Career statistics ==
As of 17 May 2026

Club	Season	League			Cup		Other		Total	
Club	Season	Division	Apps	Goals	Apps	Goals	Apps	Goals	Apps	Goals
Vybor-Kurbatovo	2014–15	Russian Second League	13	0	2	0	—		15	0
Sochi	2014–15	Russian Second League	10	2	—		—		10	2
Sibir Novosibirsk	2015–16	Russian First League	29	0	0	0	2 (Note: Appearances in FNL Cup)	0	31	0
Sibir Novosibirsk	2016–17	Russian First League	33	0	4	0	—		37	0
Sibir Novosibirsk	2017–18	Russian First League	22	4	1	0	—		23	4
Sibir Novosibirsk	Total		84	4	5	0	2	0	91	4
Baltika Kaliningrad	2017–18	Russian First League	9	0	—		—		9	0
Baltika Kaliningrad	2018–19	Russian First League	34	4	2	2	—		36	6
Baltika Kaliningrad	Total		43	4	2	2	0	0	45	6
Torpedo Moscow	2019–20	Russian First League	25	0	2	0	—		27	0
Torpedo Moscow	2020–21	Russian First League	38	1	0	0	—		38	1
Torpedo Moscow	Total		63	1	2	0	0	0	65	1
Fakel Voronezh	2021–22	Russian First League	35	1	3	0	—		38	1
Fakel Voronezh	2022–23	Russian Premier League	25	1	6	0	1 (Note: Appearance in relegation play-offs)	0	32	1
Fakel Voronezh	2023–24	Russian Premier League	26	0	6	1	—		32	1
Fakel Voronezh	Total		86	2	15	1	1	0	102	3
Sochi	2024–25	Russian First League	30	4	4	0	2 (Note: Appearances in promotion play-offs)	0	36	4
Sochi	2025–26	Russian Premier League	17	0	3	0	—		20	0
Sochi	Total		46	4	7	0	2	0	56	4
Career total			346	17	33	3	5	0	384	20
