= Ruslan Gordiyenko =

Russian footballer

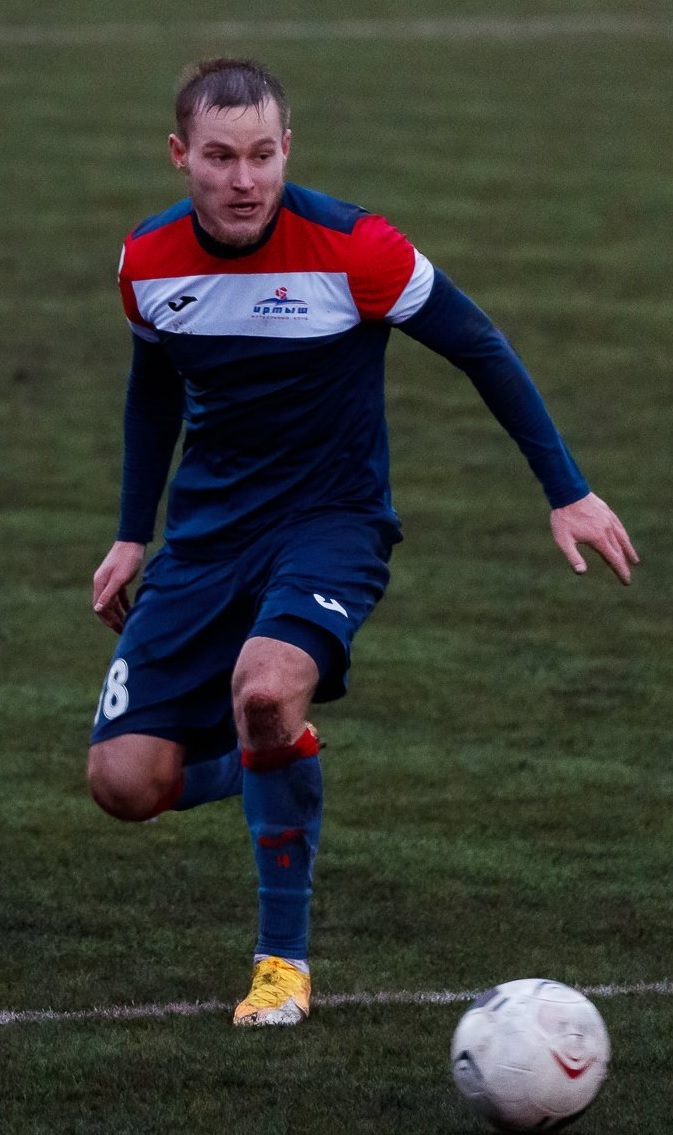
- Gordiyenko with Irtysh Omsk in 2020

Personal information
- Full name: Ruslan Yevgenyevich Gordiyenko
- Date of birth: 17 February 1995 (age 31)
- Place of birth: Pogranichny, Russia
- Height: 1.76 m (5 ft 9 in)
- Position: Forward

Youth career
- PFC CSKA Moscow

Senior career*
Years	Team	Apps	(Gls)
2014–2020	FC Luch Vladivostok	148	(16)
2020	FC Irtysh Omsk	23	(0)
2021	FC Sokol Saratov	4	(1)
2021–2022	FC Dynamo Vladivostok	28	(5)
- * Club domestic league appearances and goals

Ruslan Yevgenyevich Gordiyenko (Russian: Руслан Евгеньевич Гордиенко; born 17 February 1995) is a Russian former football player.

== Club career ==
He made his debut in the Russian Football National League for FC Luch-Energiya Vladivostok on 29 March 2015 in a game against FC Anzhi Makhachkala.
