= Artur Gilyazetdinov =

Russian footballer

Personal information
- Full name: Artur Gusmanovich Gilyazetdinov
- Date of birth: 10 March 1995 (age 31)
- Place of birth: Kazan, Russia
- Height: 1.83 m (6 ft 0 in)
- Position: Forward

Team information
- Current team: Ufa
- Number: 43

Youth career
- 2013–2014: DYuSSh Vakhitovsky Kazan

Senior career*
Years	Team	Apps	(Gls)
2017	Anzhi-Yunior	16	(6)
2018–2019	Neftekhimik	39	(0)
2020–2021	Tyumen	25	(5)
2021–2024	Volgar Astrakhan	88	(5)
2024–2026	Yenisey Krasnoyarsk	48	(1)
2026–	Ufa	0	(0)
- * Club domestic league appearances and goals as of 16 May 2026

Artur Gusmanovich Gilyazetdinov (Tatar: Артур Госман улы Гыйләҗетдинов, Russian: Артур Гусманович Гилязетдинов; born 10 March 1995) is a Russian football player who plays for Ufa.

== Club career ==
He made his debut in the Russian Professional Football League for Anzhi-Yunior Zelenodolsk on 19 July 2017 in a game against Nosta Novotroitsk and scored twice on his debut.

He made his Russian Football National League debut for Neftekhimik Nizhnekamsk on 7 July 2019 in a game against Mordovia Saransk.
