= Dmitri Saganovich =

Russian footballer

Personal information
- Full name: Dmitri Yevgenyevich Saganovich
- Date of birth: 23 May 1998 (age 28)
- Place of birth: Astrakhan, Russia
- Height: 1.92 m (6 ft 3 1/2 in)
- Position: Goalkeeper

Team information
- Current team: FC Luki-Energiya Velikiye Luki
- Number: 30

Senior career*
Years	Team	Apps	(Gls)
2015–2023	FC Volgar Astrakhan	75	(0)
2023–2026	FC Mashuk-KMV Pyatigorsk	40	(0)
2026–	FC Luki-Energiya Velikiye Luki	14	(1)
- * Club domestic league appearances and goals as of 1 November 2026

Dmitri Yevgenyevich Saganovich (Russian: Дмитрий Евгеньевич Саганович; born 23 May 1998) is a Russian football player who plays for FC Luki-Energiya Velikiye Luki.

== Club career ==
He made his debut in the Russian Football National League for FC Volgar Astrakhan on 22 August 2020 in a game against FC Chayka Peschanokopskoye.
