= Aleksei Sapayev =

Russian footballer

Personal information
- Full name: Aleksei Vladimirovich Sapayev
- Date of birth: 28 January 1983 (age 43)
- Place of birth: Omsk, Russian SFSR
- Height: 1.80 m (5 ft 11 in)
- Positions: Defender; midfielder

Youth career
- FC Irtysh Omsk

Senior career*
Years	Team	Apps	(Gls)
2001	FC Irtysh Omsk	19	(0)
2002	FC Torpedo-Alttrak Rubtsovsk	10	(1)
2003–2012	FC Irtysh Omsk	248	(12)
2012–2013	FC Metallurg-Kuzbass Novokuznetsk	24	(1)
2013–2016	FC Irtysh Omsk	67	(5)
2016–2017	FC Sakhalin Yuzhno-Sakhalinsk	20	(0)
2017–2018	FC Murom	25	(1)
2018–2021	FC Dynamo Bryansk	59	(5)
- * Club domestic league appearances and goals

Aleksei Vladimirovich Sapayev (Russian: Алексей Владимирович Сапаев; born 28 January 1983) is a Russian former professional football player.

== Club career ==
He made his Russian Football National League debut for FC Irtysh Omsk on 18 April 2010 in a game against FC Avangard Kursk.
