= Denis Chushyalov =

Russian football midfielder

Personal information
- Full name: Denis Mikhaylovich Chushyalov
- Date of birth: 26 August 1992 (age 34)
- Height: 1.74 m (5 ft 9 in)
- Position: Midfielder

Team information
- Current team: Amkar Perm
- Number: 14

Senior career*
Years	Team	Apps	(Gls)
2012–2015	KAMAZ Naberezhnye Chelny	68	(3)
2015–2016	Zenit-Izhevsk	14	(1)
2017–2021	KAMAZ Naberezhnye Chelny	84	(10)
2021–2022	Zvezda Perm	27	(1)
2022–2023	Zenit-Izhevsk	24	(3)
2023–2024	Irtysh Omsk	32	(0)
2024–	Amkar Perm	57	(3)
- * Club domestic league appearances and goals as of 17 October 2026

Denis Mikhaylovich Chushyalov (Russian: Денис Михайлович Чушъялов; born 26 August 1992) is a Russian football midfielder who plays for Amkar Perm.

== Club career ==
He made his debut in the Russian Second Division for FC KAMAZ Naberezhnye Chelny on 21 July 2012 in a game against Spartak Yoshkar-Ola. He made his Russian Football National League debut for KAMAZ on 11 July 2015 in a game against Gazovik Orenburg.
