= Oleg Yolkin =

Russian footballer

Personal information
- Full name: Oleg Olegovich Yolkin
- Date of birth: 26 April 1986 (age 40)
- Place of birth: Tiraspol, Moldovan SSR
- Height: 1.76 m (5 ft 9 in)
- Position: Midfielder

Youth career
- Kirovets-Nadezhda St. Petersburg

Senior career*
Years	Team	Apps	(Gls)
2004	FC Lokomotiv St. Petersburg (amateur)		
2005	CS Tiligul-Tiras Tiraspol	1	(0)
2006–2008	FC Dinamo Bender	42	(3)
2008	FC TEKS Ivanteyevka		
2009–2013	FC Oryol	81	(7)
2013	FC Tyumen	2	(0)
2013–2014	FC Oryol	22	(6)
2014	FC Vybor-Kurbatovo Voronezh	8	(0)
2015–2018	FC Znamya Truda Orekhovo-Zuyevo	87	(11)
- * Club domestic league appearances and goals

Oleg Olegovich Yolkin (Russian: Олег Олегович Ёлкин; born 26 April 1986) is a Russian former professional football player.

== Club career ==
He played 3 seasons in the Moldovan National Division.
