= Aleksandr Nevidimy =

Russian footballer

Personal information
- Full name: Aleksandr Sergeyevich Nevidimy
- Date of birth: 5 August 1988 (age 38)
- Place of birth: Novorossiysk, Russian SFSR
- Height: 1.80 m (5 ft 11 in)
- Positions: Midfielder; defender

Youth career
- FC Chernomorets Novorossiysk

Senior career*
Years	Team	Apps	(Gls)
2006–2007	FC Chernomorets Novorossiysk	5	(0)
2007	FC Spartak-UGP Anapa	11	(0)
2008	FC Chernomorets Novorossiysk	15	(0)
2009	FC Stavropol	23	(0)
2010	FC Dynamo-Biolog Novokubansk (amateur)		
2011	FC Slavyansky Slavyansk-na-Kubani	12	(1)
2011–2012	FC Sheksna Cherepovets	26	(2)
2012–2013	FC Dnepr Smolensk	21	(0)
2013–2014	FC Oryol	25	(2)
2014	FC Vybor-Kurbatovo Voronezh	16	(0)
2015	FC Dynamo GTS Stavropol	9	(0)
2015–2016	FC Dynamo Stavropol	19	(0)
2016–2018	FC Druzhba Maykop	40	(2)
- * Club domestic league appearances and goals

Aleksandr Sergeyevich Nevidimy (Russian: Александр Серге́евич Невидимый; born 5 August 1988) is a Russian former professional football player.

== Club career ==
He played in the Russian Football National League for FC Chernomorets Novorossiysk in 2008.
