= Mikhail Salnikov =

Russian footballer and coach

Personal information
- Full name: Mikhail Valeryevich Salnikov
- Date of birth: 17 December 1974 (age 51)
- Place of birth: Chelyabinsk, Russian SFSR
- Height: 1.90 m (6 ft 3 in)
- Position: Defender

Team information
- Current team: FC Luki-Energiya Velikiye Luki (manager)

Youth career
- SDYuShOR-3 Chelyabinsk
- FC Signal Chelyabinsk

Senior career*
Years	Team	Apps	(Gls)
1991	FC Zenit Chelyabinsk	15	(0)
1992	FC Signal Chelyabinsk		
1992–1993	FC Zenit Chelyabinsk	44	(0)
1993	FC Signal Chelyabinsk		
1994–1997	FC Torpedo Volzhsky	111	(2)
1997–1998	FC Lada Togliatti	27	(5)
1998	FC Gazovik-Gazprom Izhevsk	14	(1)
2000	FC Nosta Novotroitsk	31	(2)
2001	FC Metallurg Lipetsk	38	(1)
2002–2004	FC Lukoil Chelyabinsk	31	(2)

Managerial career
- 2017–2018: FC Chelyabinsk
- 2018–2019: FC Chelyabinsk (assistant)
- 2019–2022: FC Chelyabinsk
- 2022: FC Veles Moscow
- 2023: FC Novosibirsk
- 2023–2025: FC Dynamo Vladivostok
- 2026–: FC Luki-Energiya Velikiye Luki
- * Club domestic league appearances and goals

Mikhail Valeryevich Salnikov (Russian: Михаил Валерьевич Сальников; born 17 December 1974) is a Russian professional football coach and former player who is the manager of FC Luki-Energiya Velikiye Luki.
