= Nikita Kiverin =

Russian footballer

Personal information
- Full name: Nikita Olegovich Kiverin
- Date of birth: 25 March 1990 (age 36)
- Place of birth: Omsk, Russian SFSR
- Height: 1.73 m (5 ft 8 in)
- Position: Midfielder

Team information
- Current team: FC Novokuznetsk

Youth career
- FC Dynamo Omsk

Senior career*
Years	Team	Apps	(Gls)
2008	FC Irtysh-1946 Omsk	3	(0)
2009	FC Irtysh Omsk (reserves)		
2010–2016	FC Irtysh Omsk	122	(10)
2017–2018	FC Murom	25	(1)
2019–	FC Novokuznetsk (amateur)		
- * Club domestic league appearances and goals as of 27 May 2018

Nikita Olegovich Kiverin (Russian: Никита Олегович Киверин; born 25 March 1990) is a Russian professional football player. He plays for FC Novokuznetsk.

== Club career ==
He played in the Russian Football National League for FC Irtysh Omsk in 2010.
