= Chornyi =

Chornyi ((Ukrainian: Чорний), feminine: Chorna) is a Ukrainian surname literally meaning "black". It may also transiterated as Chorny. Notable people with the surname include:

- Georgii Chornyi
- Halyna Chorna
- Mariya Chorna
- Mykhaylo Chornyi
- Tetyana Chorna
- Valeriy Chornyi
- Vasyl Chornyi
- Viktor Chornyi
- Zhanna Usenko-Chorna
