= Sergei Gavrilov (footballer) =

Russian footballer

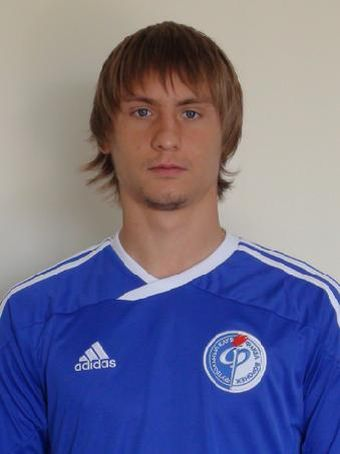

Personal information
- Full name: Sergei Olegovich Gavrilov
- Date of birth: 14 January 1987 (age 39)
- Place of birth: Tomsk, Russian SFSR
- Height: 1.81 m (5 ft 11 in)
- Position: Defender

Senior career*
Years	Team	Apps	(Gls)
2005–2008	FC Tom Tomsk	0	(0)
2008	FC Gubkin	4	(1)
2009–2013	FC Fakel Voronezh	74	(0)
2013–2014	FC Zvezda Ryazan	16	(0)
2014	FC Vybor-Kurbatovo Voronezh	6	(0)
2015	FC Taganrog	16	(3)
2015–2016	FC Dynamo Bryansk	17	(1)
2016–2017	TSK Simferopol	2	(0)
2017–2024	FC Lokomotiv Liski (amateur)		
- * Club domestic league appearances and goals

Sergei Olegovich Gavrilov (Russian: Серге́й Олегович Гаврилов; born 14 January 1987) is a Russian former professional football player.

== Club career ==
He made his debut for FC Tom Tomsk on 13 July 2005 in the Russian Cup game against FC Spartak Kostroma.

He played in the Russian Football National League for FC Fakel Voronezh in the 2011–12 season.
