= Aleksei Skvortsov =

Russian footballer

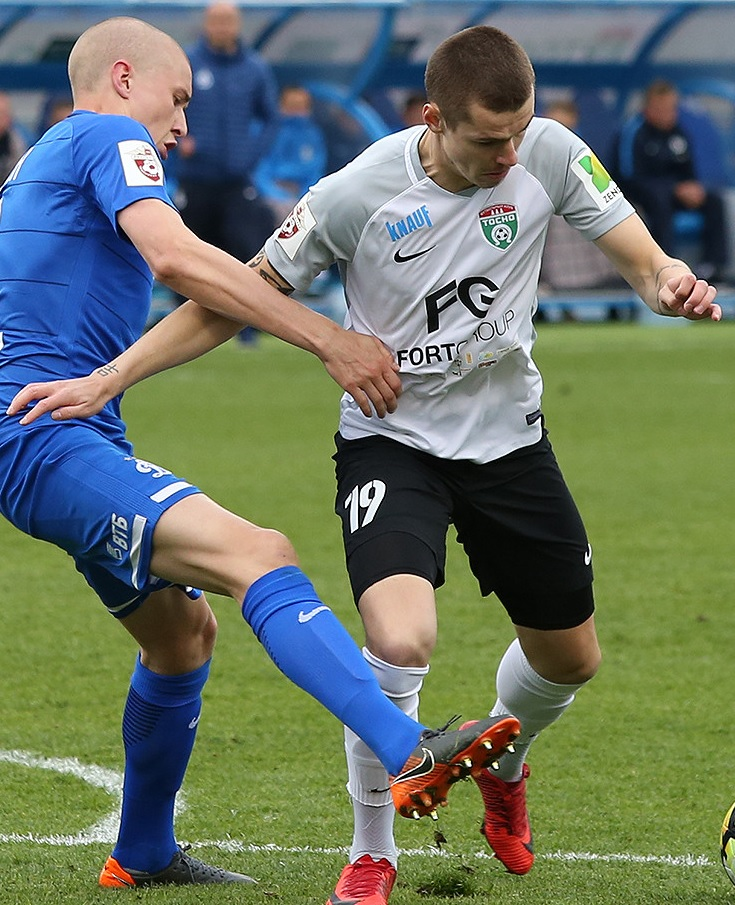
- Skvortsov (R) with Tosno in 2018

Personal information
- Full name: Aleksei Igorevich Skvortsov
- Date of birth: 13 January 1992 (age 34)
- Place of birth: Saint Petersburg, Russia
- Height: 1.87 m (6 ft 2 in)
- Positions: Right winger; forward

Team information
- Current team: Metallurg Lipetsk
- Number: 92

Senior career*
Years	Team	Apps	(Gls)
2011–2012	Amkar Perm	0	(0)
2012	Gandzasar	1	(0)
2013	Karelia Petrozavodsk	4	(0)
2013–2014	Dynamo Kirov	25	(3)
2014–2016	Yenisey Krasnoyarsk	34	(2)
2016–2017	Volgar Astrakhan	25	(1)
2017	Tambov	24	(6)
2018	Tosno	3	(0)
2018–2019	Nizhny Novgorod	26	(2)
2019–2020	Khimki	25	(4)
2020–2021	Orenburg	23	(2)
2021–2022	Yenisey Krasnoyarsk	13	(2)
2023–2025	Tekstilshchik Ivanovo	67	(21)
2025–2026	Sibir Novosibirsk	14	(2)
2026–	Metallurg Lipetsk	25	(7)

International career
2011	Russia U-19	3	(0)
- * Club domestic league appearances and goals as of 31 October 2026

Aleksei Igorevich Skvortsov (Russian: Алексей Игоревич Скворцов; born 13 January 1992) is a Russian football player who plays as a right winger or forward for Metallurg Lipetsk.

== Career ==
Skvortsov made his debut in the Russian Second Division for Karelia Petrozavodsk on 17 May 2013 in a game against Piter St. Petersburg.

On 4 January 2016, Skvortsov left Yenisey Krasnoyarsk by mutual consent.

On 10 January 2018, he signed with the Russian Premier League club Tosno. He made his RPL debut for Tosno on 29 April 2018 in a game against Rostov.

Skvortsov scored the first goal as Tosno won the 2017–18 Russian Cup final against Avangard Kursk on 9 May 2018 in the Volgograd Arena.

== Honours ==
=== Club ===
Tosno

- Russian Cup: 2017–18

== Career statistics ==
As of 13 May 2018

Club	Season	League			Cup		Continental		Total	
Club	Season	Division	Apps	Goals	Apps	Goals	Apps	Goals	Apps	Goals
Amkar Perm	2010	Russian Premier League	0	0	0	0	–		0	0
Amkar Perm	2011–12	Russian Premier League	0	0	0	0	–		0	0
Amkar Perm	Total		0	0	0	0	0	0	0	0
Gandzasar	2012–13	Armenian Premier League	1	0	0	0	–		1	0
Karelia Petrozavodsk	2012–13	PFL	4	0	–		–		4	0
Dynamo Kirov	2013–14	PFL	25	3	2	0	–		27	3
Yenisey Krasnoyarsk	2014–15	FNL	22	2	1	0	–		23	2
Yenisey Krasnoyarsk	2015–16	FNL	12	0	0	0	–		12	0
Yenisey Krasnoyarsk	Total		34	2	1	0	0	0	35	2
Volgar Astrakhan	2015–16	FNL	7	0	–		–		7	0
Volgar Astrakhan	2016–17	FNL	18	1	2	0	–		20	1
Volgar Astrakhan	Total		25	1	2	0	0	0	27	1
Tambov	2017–18	FNL	24	6	3	1	–		27	7
Tosno	2017–18	Russian Premier League	3	0	1	1	–		4	1
Career total			116	12	9	2	0	0	125	14
