= Artyom Pasko =

Kazakhstani-born Russian footballer

Personal information
- Full name: Artyom Andreyevich Pasko
- Date of birth: 3 April 1992 (age 34)
- Place of birth: Aktyubinsk, Kazakhstan
- Height: 1.84 m (6 ft 0 in)
- Positions: Defender; midfielder

Senior career*
Years	Team	Apps	(Gls)
2009–2010	FC Rubin-2 Kazan	12	(0)
2011–2014	FC Dynamo Kirov	88	(2)
2014	FC Baltika Kaliningrad	3	(0)
2015	FC Zenit-Izhevsk	8	(0)
2015–2016	FC Volga Nizhny Novgorod	25	(1)
2016–2017	FC Sokol Saratov	31	(1)
2017–2018	FC Dynamo Saint Petersburg	10	(0)
2018	→ FC Dynamo-2 Saint Petersburg	4	(0)
2018	FC Zorky Krasnogorsk	15	(0)
2019–2021	FC Sokol Saratov	48	(2)
2021–2022	FC Irtysh Omsk	24	(0)
2022–2023	FC Tyumen	16	(1)
2023–2026	FC Dynamo Kirov	60	(4)
- * Club domestic league appearances and goals

Artyom Andreyevich Pasko (Russian: Артём Андреевич Пасько; born 3 April 1992) is a Russian former professional football player.

== Club career ==
He made his Russian Football National League debut for FC Baltika Kaliningrad on 7 September 2014 in a game against PFC Krylia Sovetov Samara.
