= Chyornoye, Perm Krai =

Chyornoye Чёрное
- Settlement
- Location within Perm Krai Location within Russia
- Coordinates: 59°40′N 56°56′E
- Country: Russia
- Region: Perm Krai
- District: Solikamsky District
- Time zone: UTC+5:00

Chyornoye (Russian: Чёрное) is a rural locality (a settlement) with 25 streets in Solikamsky District, Perm Krai, Russia. The population was 1,014 as of 2010.

== Geography ==
Chyornoye is located 11 km east of Solikamsk (the district's administrative centre) by road. Kharyushina is the nearest rural locality.
