= Donat Dzhatiyev =

Russian footballer

Personal information
- Full name: Donat Sergeyevich Dzhatiyev
- Date of birth: 7 May 1992 (age 34)
- Place of birth: Pyatigorsk, Russia
- Height: 1.79 m (5 ft 10 in)
- Position: Forward

Youth career
- SDYuSShOR-6 Pyatigorsk
- Konoplyov football academy

Senior career*
Years	Team	Apps	(Gls)
2009–2012	FC Mashuk-KMV Pyatigorsk	70	(17)
2012–2013	FC Baltika Kaliningrad	13	(0)
2013–2022	FC Mashuk-KMV Pyatigorsk	129	(26)
- * Club domestic league appearances and goals

Donat Sergeyevich Dzhatiyev (Russian: Донат Серге́евич Джатиев; born 7 May 1992) is a Russian former professional football player.

== Club career ==
He made his Russian Football National League debut for FC Baltika Kaliningrad on 16 July 2012 in a game against FC Volgar Astrakhan.
