= Chyornaya, Kichmengsko-Gorodetsky District, Vologda Oblast =

Chyornaya
- Interactive map of Chyornaya
- Coordinates: 59°53′N 45°48′E
- Country: Russia
- Region: Vologda Oblast
- District: Kichmengsko-Gorodetsky District
- Time zone: UTC+3:00

Chyornaya (Russian: Черная) is a rural locality (a village) in Kichmegnskoye Rural Settlement, Kichmengsko-Gorodetsky District, Vologda Oblast, Russia. The population was 7 as of 2002.

== Geography ==
Chyornaya is located 13 km south of Kichmengsky Gorodok (the district's administrative centre) by road. Gridenskaya is the nearest rural locality.
