= Red Star Stadium (Omsk) =

Sports venue in Omsk, Russia

Coordinates: 54°58′24″N 73°25′37″E

- Стадион Красная Звезда
- Address: Ulitsa Maslennikova, 142/1; Omsk, Russia
- Capacity: 4655
- Opened: 12 May 1966

Tenants
- FC Irtysh Omsk ( Russian Second League)

Website
- https://fc-irtysh.ru/infrastructure/redstar55/

Red Star Stadium (Russian: Стадион Красная Звезда) is a multi-purpose stadium in Omsk, Russia. It is currently used mostly for football matches. The stadium was opened on May 12th, 1966, and has a current seating capacity of 4,655 spectators.

The stadium is currently home to the third-tier Russian Second League team FC Irtysh Omsk.
