= Yevgeni Marichev =

Russian footballer

Personal information
- Full name: Yevgeni Stanislavovich Marichev
- Date of birth: 27 July 1995 (age 31)
- Place of birth: Fryazino, Russia
- Height: 1.78 m (5 ft 10 in)
- Position: Midfielder

Team information
- Current team: FC Amkal Moscow

Senior career*
Years	Team	Apps	(Gls)
2014	LFK Lokomotiv Moscow		
2016–2019	FC Ryazan	60	(17)
2019–2021	FC Tekstilshchik Ivanovo	54	(4)
2021–2022	FC Ryazan	29	(3)
2022	FC Spartak Kostroma	11	(1)
2023	FC Zorkiy Krasnogorsk	8	(1)
2023–	FC Amkal Moscow		
- * Club domestic league appearances and goals as of 10 June 2023

Yevgeni Stanislavovich Marichev (Russian: Евгений Станиславович Маричев; born 27 July 1995) is a Russian football player who plays for FC Amkal Moscow.

== Club career ==
He made his debut in the Russian Professional Football League for FC Ryazan on 2 September 2016 in a game against FC Energomash Belgorod.

He made his Russian Football National League debut for FC Tekstilshchik Ivanovo on 7 July 2019 in a game against FC Yenisey Krasnoyarsk.
