= Artyom Motov =

Russian footballer

Personal information
- Full name: Artyom Pavlovich Motov
- Date of birth: 28 July 1990 (age 36)
- Height: 1.90 m (6 ft 3 in)
- Positions: Forward; midfielder

Youth career
- FC Shinnik Yaroslavl

Senior career*
Years	Team	Apps	(Gls)
2007–2008	FC Shinnik Yaroslavl	1	(0)
2009	FC Shinnik-Uglich Yaroslavl		
2010	FC Shinnik Yaroslavl	0	(0)
2010	→ FC Dynamo Kostroma (loan)	15	(0)
2011–2012	FC Tekstilshchik Ivanovo	9	(0)
2012–2014	FC Vologda	54	(15)
2014–2015	FC Zenit Penza	25	(6)
2015	FC Avangard Kursk	9	(0)
2016	FC Vityaz Podolsk	9	(0)
2017	FC Syzran-2003	7	(4)
2017	FC Chita	8	(0)
- * Club domestic league appearances and goals

Artyom Pavlovich Motov (Russian: Артём Павлович Мотов; born 28 July 1990) is a Russian former professional football player.

== Club career ==
He made his Russian Football National League debut for FC Shinnik Yaroslavl on 16 October 2007 in a game against FC Salyut-Energiya Belgorod. That was his only season in the FNL.
