= Maksim Rudnev =

Russian footballer

Personal information
- Full name: Maksim Yuryevich Rudnev
- Date of birth: 20 April 1997 (age 29)
- Place of birth: Sayanogorsk, Russia
- Height: 1.84 m (6 ft 0 in)
- Position: Forward

Youth career
- FC Yenisey Krasnoyarsk

Senior career*
Years	Team	Apps	(Gls)
2016–2020	FC Yenisey Krasnoyarsk	10	(2)
2018–2019	→ FC Syzran-2003 (loan)	20	(4)
2020–2021	FC Zenit-Izhevsk	16	(1)
2021–2023	FC Chelyabinsk	54	(18)
2023–2024	FC Forte Taganrog	20	(1)
2024–2025	FC Torpedo Miass	15	(1)
2025–2026	FC Dynamo Vladivostok	18	(1)
- * Club domestic league appearances and goals as of 18 October 2025

Maksim Yuryevich Rudnev (Russian: Максим Юрьевич Руднев; born 20 April 1997) is a Russian football player who plays as a centre forward.

== Club career ==
He made his debut in the Russian Football National League for FC Yenisey Krasnoyarsk on 12 March 2016 in a game against FC Baikal Irkutsk.
