= Nikita Chaly =

Russian football player

Personal information
- Full name: Nikita Ilyich Chaly
- Date of birth: 7 May 1996 (age 30)
- Place of birth: Novorossiysk, Russia
- Height: 1.78 m (5 ft 10 in)
- Positions: Midfielder; forward

Youth career
- Chernomorets Novorossiysk

Senior career*
Years	Team	Apps	(Gls)
2013–2014	Chernomorets Novorossiysk	15	(0)
2015	Pontoz Vityazevo		
2016–2018	Chernomorets Novorossiysk	60	(6)
2018–2019	Chayka Peschanokopskoye	29	(4)
2020	Tyumen	15	(1)
2021–2022	Chernomorets Novorossiysk	41	(2)
2022–2023	Armavir (amateur)		
2024	Nart Cherkessk	15	(1)
2025	Dynamo Barnaul	17	(0)
- * Club domestic league appearances and goals as of 19 October 2025

Nikita Ilyich Chaly (Russian: Никита Ильич Чалый; born 7 May 1996) is a Russian football player.

== Club career ==
He made his debut in the Russian Second Division for Chernomorets Novorossiysk on 12 July 2013 in a game against Krasnodar-2.

He made his Russian Football National League debut for Chayka Peschanokopskoye on 20 July 2019 in a game against Baltika Kaliningrad.
