= Sergei Kramarenko (footballer, born 1994) =

Russian footballer

Personal information
- Full name: Sergei Sergeyevich Kramarenko
- Date of birth: 2 November 1994 (age 31)
- Place of birth: Rostov-on-Don, Russia
- Height: 1.71 m (5 ft 7 in)
- Position: Midfielder

Senior career*
Years	Team	Apps	(Gls)
2012	FC SKA Rostov-on-Don	19	(0)
2014–2015	FC MITOS Novocherkassk	17	(2)
2015–2017	PFC Spartak Nalchik	51	(4)
2017–2018	FC Shinnik Yaroslavl	21	(1)
2018–2019	FC Chayka Peschanokopskoye	23	(4)
2019–2020	FC Alania Vladikavkaz	16	(1)
2021	FC Kuban-Holding Pavlovskaya	16	(2)
2021–2022	FC Novosibirsk	21	(2)
2022–2023	FC Dynamo Vladivostok	44	(10)
2024	FC Sakhalin Yuzhno-Sakhalinsk	13	(2)
2025	FC Kuban-Holding Pavlovskaya	5	(0)
- * Club domestic league appearances and goals as of 29 June 2025

Sergei Sergeyevich Kramarenko (Russian: Серге́й Серге́евич Крамаренко; born 2 November 1994) is a Russian football midfielder.

== Club career ==
He made his debut in the Russian Second Division for FC SKA Rostov-on-Don on 16 July 2012 in a game against FC Alania-d Vladikavkaz.

He made his Russian Football National League debut for PFC Spartak Nalchik on 11 July 2016 in a game against FC Kuban Krasnodar.

He was promoted to the Russian First League three times, with PFC Spartak Nalchik, FC Chayka Peschanokopskoye and FC Alania Vladikavkaz.
