= Aleksei Podprugin =

Russian footballer

Personal information
- Full name: Aleksei Sergeyevich Podprugin
- Date of birth: 2 April 1988 (age 38)
- Place of birth: Ust-Ilimsk, Irkutsk Oblast, Russian SFSR
- Height: 1.95 m (6 ft 5 in)
- Position: Defender

Senior career*
Years	Team	Apps	(Gls)
2006–2010	FC Chita	114	(3)
2012–2013	FC Chita	8	(0)
2014–2018	FC Chita	73	(5)
2018–2020	FC Altai Semey	51	(8)
2021	FC Chita	12	(2)
2021–2023	FC Dynamo Vladivostok	61	(6)
- * Club domestic league appearances and goals

Aleksei Sergeyevich Podprugin (Russian: Алексей Серге́евич Подпругин; born 2 April 1988) is a Russian former professional football player.

== Club career ==
He played in the Russian Football National League for FC Chita in 2009.
