= Ilya Shvedyuk =

Russian footballer

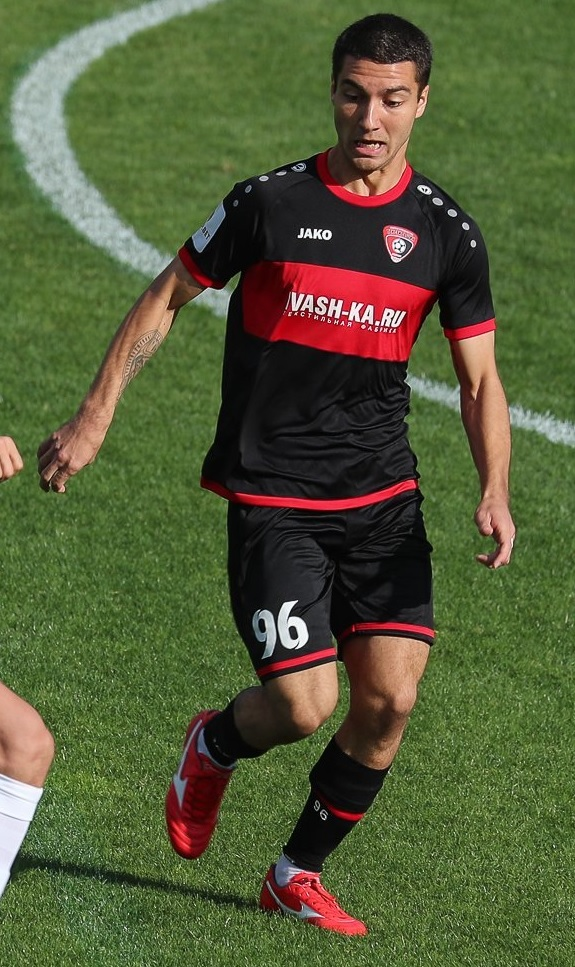
- Shvedyuk with Tekstilshchik Ivanovo in 2021

Personal information
- Full name: Ilya Aleksandrovich Shvedyuk
- Date of birth: 7 September 1996 (age 30)
- Place of birth: Blagoveshchensk, Russia
- Height: 1.78 m (5 ft 10 in)
- Position: Midfielder

Team information
- Current team: FC Luki-Energiya Velikiye Luki
- Number: 7

Youth career
- FC Smena Komsomolsk-na-Amure

Senior career*
Years	Team	Apps	(Gls)
2015–2016	FC Blagoveshchensk		
2016–2018	FC Smena Komsomolsk-na-Amure	28	(5)
2018–2020	FC Nosta Novotroitsk	39	(3)
2020–2021	FC Avangard Kursk	24	(1)
2021–2022	FC Tekstilshchik Ivanovo	31	(0)
2022–2023	FC Chelyabinsk	26	(2)
2023–2025	FC Forte Taganrog	56	(7)
2025–2026	FC Dynamo Vladivostok	20	(1)
2026–	FC Luki-Energiya Velikiye Luki	10	(0)
- * Club domestic league appearances and goals as of 1 November 2026

Ilya Aleksandrovich Shvedyuk (Russian: Илья Александрович Шведюк; born 7 September 1996) is a Russian football player who plays for FC Luki-Energiya Velikiye Luki.

== Club career ==
He made his debut in the Russian Football National League for FC Tekstilshchik Ivanovo on 10 July 2021 in a game against FC Rotor Volgograd.
