= Yevgeni Voronin =

Russian footballer

Personal information
- Full name: Yevgeni Vladimirovich Voronin
- Date of birth: 31 October 1995 (age 31)
- Place of birth: Moscow, Russia
- Height: 1.76 m (5 ft 9 in)
- Position: Midfielder

Team information
- Current team: FC KAMAZ Naberezhnye Chelny
- Number: 37

Youth career
- –2013: FC Khimki
- 2013–2014: FC Lokomotiv Moscow

Senior career*
Years	Team	Apps	(Gls)
2015–2017	FC Vityaz Podolsk	54	(7)
2017–2019	FC Volga Ulyanovsk	45	(9)
2019–2022	FC KAMAZ Naberezhnye Chelny	62	(11)
2022	FC Yenisey Krasnoyarsk	7	(0)
2022–2026	FC Volga Ulyanovsk	114	(17)
2026–	FC KAMAZ Naberezhnye Chelny	0	(0)
- * Club domestic league appearances and goals as of 16 May 2026

Yevgeni Vladimirovich Voronin (Russian: Евгений Владимирович Воронин; born 31 October 1995) is a Russian football player who plays for FC KAMAZ Naberezhnye Chelny.

== Club career ==
He made his debut in the Russian Football National League for FC KAMAZ Naberezhnye Chelny on 10 July 2021 in a game against FC Alania Vladikavkaz.
