= Yuri Dubrovin =

Russian professional footballer

Personal information
- Full name: Yuri Valeryevich Dubrovin
- Date of birth: 10 September 1984 (age 42)
- Place of birth: Kaluga, Russian SFSR
- Height: 1.83 m (6 ft 0 in)
- Position: Midfielder

Senior career*
Years	Team	Apps	(Gls)
2004–2005	Lada Togliatti	36	(0)
2006	Zvezda Serpukhov	11	(1)
2007	Darida Minsk Raion	4	(0)
2007	Dynamo Saint Petersburg	13	(1)
2008–2009	Krasnodar	42	(3)
2010	Tyumen	25	(1)
2011	Luch-Energiya Vladivostok	4	(0)
2012–2013	Tyumen	25	(3)
2013–2015	Fakel Voronezh	50	(6)
2016–2022	Kaluga	126	(26)
- * Club domestic league appearances and goals

Yuri Valeryevich Dubrovin (Russian: Юрий Валерьевич Дубровин; born 10 September 1984) is a Russian former professional footballer.

== Club career ==
He made his Russian Football National League debut for FC Krasnodar on 28 March 2009 in a game against FC Shinnik Yaroslavl.
