= Chyornaya, Nikolsky District, Vologda Oblast =

Chyornaya Черная
- Village
- Location within Vologda Oblast Location within Russia
- Coordinates: 59°51′N 45°19′E
- Country: Russia
- Region: Vologda Oblast
- District: Nikolsky District
- Time zone: UTC+3:00

Chyornaya (Russian: Черная) is a rural locality (a village) in Argunovskoye Rural Settlement, Nikolsky District, Vologda Oblast, Russia. The population was 14 as of 2002.

== Geography ==
The distance to Nikolsk is 54 km, to Argunovo is 12 km. Korepino is the nearest rural locality.
