= Aleksandr Podymov =

Russian footballer

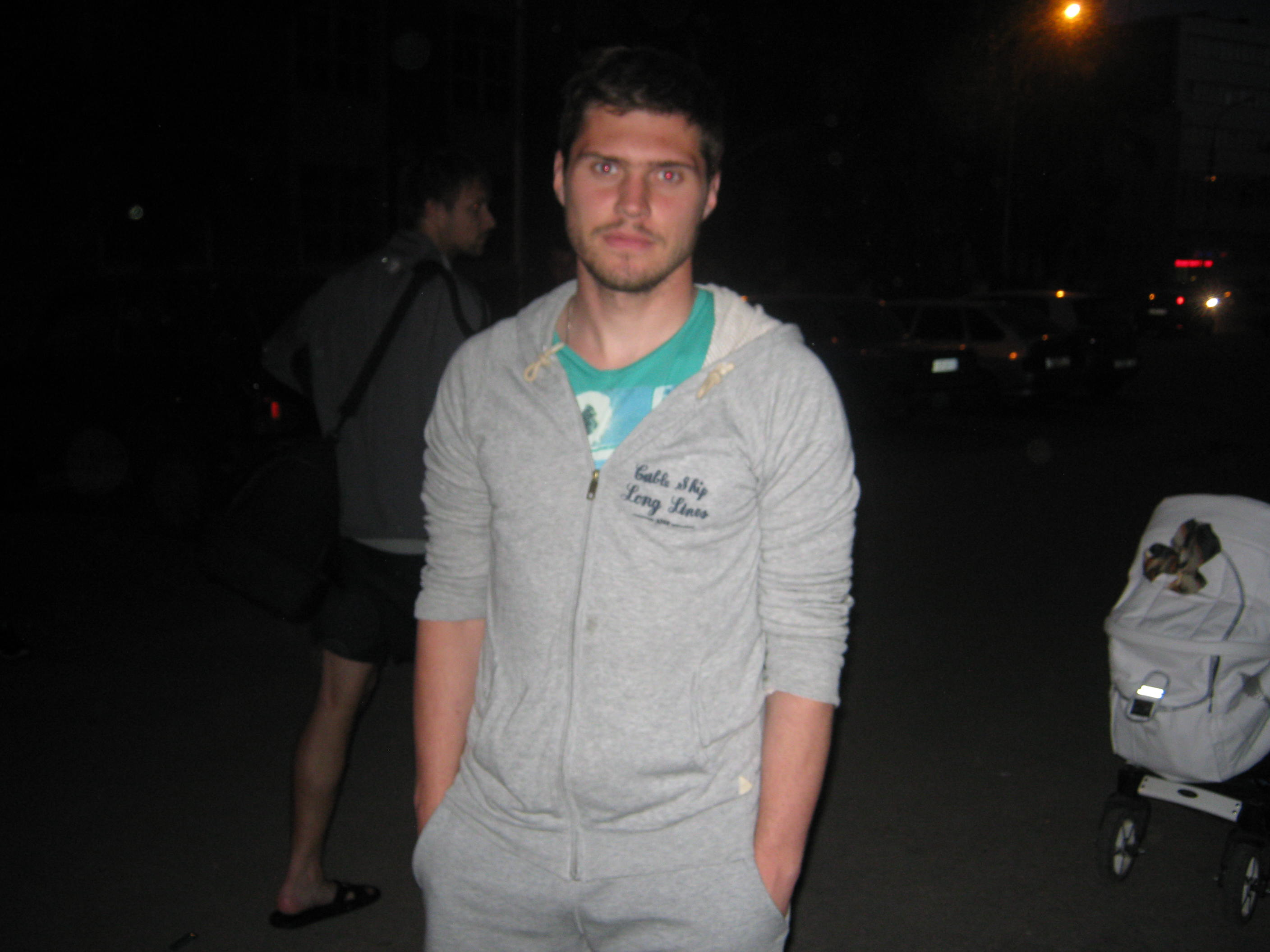

Personal information
- Full name: Aleksandr Valeryevich Podymov
- Date of birth: 22 July 1988 (age 38)
- Place of birth: Moscow, Russian SFSR
- Height: 1.76 m (5 ft 9 in)
- Positions: Midfielder; forward

Youth career
- 2004–2006: FC Torpedo Moscow

Senior career*
Years	Team	Apps	(Gls)
2006–2008	FC Torpedo Moscow	27	(0)
2009	FC Nara-ShBFR Naro-Fominsk	29	(8)
2010–2011	FC Metallurg Lipetsk	42	(13)
2011–2012	FC Neftekhimik Nizhnekamsk	32	(2)
2013	FC Sokol Saratov	10	(3)
2013–2014	FC Vityaz Podolsk	27	(3)
2014–2015	FC Khimki	16	(0)
2015–2016	FC Lokomotiv Liski	9	(1)
2016–2017	FC Vityaz Podolsk	20	(9)
2017–2019	FC Tekstilshchik Ivanovo	46	(6)
2019	FC Ararat Moscow	8	(0)
2020	FC Vityaz Podolsk (amateur)		
- * Club domestic league appearances and goals

Aleksandr Valeryevich Podymov (Russian: Александр Валерьевич Подымов; born 22 July 1988) is a Russian former professional football player.

== Club career ==
He made his debut in the Russian Premier League in 2006 for FC Torpedo Moscow.
