= Anatoli Pulyayev =

Russian footballer

Personal information
- Full name: Anatoli Viktorovich Pulyayev
- Date of birth: 27 March 1988 (age 38)
- Place of birth: Novorossiysk, Russian SFSR
- Height: 1.75 m (5 ft 9 in)
- Position: Defender

Senior career*
Years	Team	Apps	(Gls)
2007–2008	FC Spartak-UGP Anapa	43	(1)
2011–2012	FC Slavyansky Slavyansk-na-Kubani	51	(0)
2013–2019	FC Chernomorets Novorossiysk	139	(3)
- * Club domestic league appearances and goals

Anatoli Viktorovich Pulyayev (Russian: Анатолий Викторович Пуляев; born 27 March 1988) is a Russian former professional footballer.

== Club career ==
On 7 June 2019, Russian Football Union banned him from football activity for three years after he allegedly accepted a bribe for ensuring that his team FC Chernomorets Novorossiysk loses to FC Chayka Peschanokopskoye.
