= Ruslan Akhvlediani =

Russian footballer

Personal information
- Full name: Ruslan Ruslanovich Akhvlediani
- Date of birth: 8 December 1987 (age 38)
- Place of birth: Dankov, Russian SFSR
- Height: 1.81 m (5 ft 11 in)
- Position: Forward

Youth career
- DYuSSh Dankov
- FC Metallurg Lipetsk

Senior career*
| Years | Team | Apps | (Gls) |
| 2010–2023 | FC Metallurg Lipetsk | 262 | (32) |
- * Club domestic league appearances and goals

Ruslan Ruslanovich Akhvlediani (Russian: Руслан Русланович Ахвледиани; born 8 December 1987) is a Russian former football player.

== Club career ==
He made his debut in the Russian Football National League for FC Metallurg Lipetsk on 11 July 2021 in a game against FC Tom Tomsk.
