= Mikhail Rytov =

Russian footballer

Personal information
- Full name: Mikhail Aleksandrovich Rytov
- Date of birth: 4 October 1984 (age 42)
- Place of birth: Vyksa, Russian SFSR
- Height: 1.84 m (6 ft 0 in)
- Position: Defender

Senior career*
Years	Team	Apps	(Gls)
2000–2003	FC Metallurg Vyksa	58	(1)
2004–2006	FC Dynamo Bryansk	97	(5)
2007–2009	FC KAMAZ Naberezhnye Chelny	43	(1)
2009	→ FC Nizhny Novgorod (loan)	15	(0)
2010	FC Nizhny Novgorod	6	(0)
2010	→ FC Torpedo-ZIL Moscow (loan)	7	(0)
2011–2012	FC Tekstilshchik Ivanovo	42	(0)
2012–2015	FC Baltika Kaliningrad	58	(0)
2015–2016	FC Khimik Dzerzhinsk	27	(2)
2016–2017	FC Tekstilshchik Ivanovo	21	(2)
2017–2018	FC Murom	33	(2)
2019–2020	FC Volna Nizhny Novgorod Oblast (amateur)		
2020	FC Atlant-Shakhtyor Peshelan		
2020–2021	FC Metallurg Vyksa (amateur)		
2021–2022	FC Volna Nizhny Novgorod Oblast	11	(0)
- * Club domestic league appearances and goals

Mikhail Aleksandrovich Rytov (Russian: Михаил Александрович Рытов; born 4 October 1984) is a Russian former professional football player.

== Club career ==
He played 10 seasons in the Russian Football National League for 4 different clubs.
