= Chyornaya, Ustyuzhensky District, Vologda Oblast =

Chyornaya Чёрная
- Village
- Location within Vologda Oblast Location within Russia
- Coordinates: 58°43′N 36°38′E
- Country: Russia
- Region: Vologda Oblast
- District: Ustyuzhensky District
- Time zone: UTC+3:00

Chyornaya (Russian: Чёрная) is a rural locality (a village) in Soshnevskoye Rural Settlement, Ustyuzhensky District, Vologda Oblast, Russia. The population was 63 as of 2002.

== Geography ==
Chyornaya is located 37 km (23 mi) southeast of Ustyuzhna (the district's administrative centre) by road. Slavynevo is the nearest rural locality.
