= Astemir Abazov =

Russian football player

Personal information
- Full name: Astemir Valeryevich Abazov
- Date of birth: 8 December 1996 (age 29)
- Place of birth: Nalchik, Russia
- Height: 1.79 m (5 ft 10 in)
- Position: Left back

Team information
- Current team: FC Mashuk-KMV Pyatigorsk
- Number: 23

Senior career*
Years	Team	Apps	(Gls)
2014–2015	PFC Spartak Nalchik	1	(0)
2016	FC Druzhba Maykop	9	(0)
2016–2017	FC Angusht Nazran	30	(0)
2017–2018	PFC Spartak Nalchik	32	(1)
2018–2019	FC Urozhay Krasnodar	20	(0)
2019	FC Luch Vladivostok	22	(0)
2020–2021	FC KAMAZ Naberezhnye Chelny	46	(0)
2022	FC Rodina Moscow	10	(1)
2022–2023	FC Volga Ulyanovsk	25	(1)
2023–2024	FC Sokol Saratov	25	(0)
2024–	FC Mashuk-KMV Pyatigorsk	86	(8)
- * Club domestic league appearances and goals as of 15 November 2026

Astemir Valeryevich Abazov (Russian: Астемир Валерьевич Абазов; born 8 December 1996) is a Russian football player who plays for FC Mashuk-KMV Pyatigorsk.

== Club career ==
Abazov made his professional debut in the Russian Professional Football League for PFC Spartak Nalchik on 9 November 2014 in a game against FC Taganrog.

He made his Russian Football National League debut for FC Luch Vladivostok on 7 July 2019 in a game against FC Khimki.
