= Chyornaya, Permsky District, Perm Krai =

Chyornaya Чёрная
- Village
- Location within Perm Krai Location within Russia
- Coordinates: 57°32′N 55°36′E
- Country: Russia
- Region: Perm Krai
- District: Permsky District
- Time zone: UTC+5:00

Chyornaya (Russian: Чёрная) is a rural locality (a village) in Yugo-Kamskoye Rural Settlement, Permsky District, Perm Krai, Russia. The population was 10 as of 2010. There are 2 streets.

== Geography ==
Chyornaya is located 81 km southwest of Perm (the district's administrative centre) by road. Stashkovo is the nearest rural locality.
