= Dmitri Lobanov =

Russian footballer

Personal information
- Full name: Dmitri Eduardovich Lobanov
- Date of birth: 11 May 1990 (age 36)
- Place of birth: Raduzhny, Russian SFSR
- Height: 1.86 m (6 ft 1 in)
- Position: Midfielder

Senior career*
Years	Team	Apps	(Gls)
2010	FC Moscow (amateur)		
2010	FC Oka Stupino (amateur)		
2012–2015	FC Torpedo Vladimir	40	(0)
2015	FC Volga Tver	14	(0)
2016	FC Okean Kerch		
2016	FC Kubanskaya Korona Shevchenko		
2017–2018	FC Torpedo Vladimir	42	(0)
2019–2020	FC Kuban-Holding Pavlovskaya (amateur)		
- * Club domestic league appearances and goals

Dmitri Eduardovich Lobanov (Russian: Дмитрий Эдуардович Лобанов; born 11 May 1990) is a Russian former professional football player.

== Club career ==
He played in the Russian Football National League for FC Torpedo Vladimir in the 2011–12 season.
