= Chyornaya, Velikoustyugsky District, Vologda Oblast =

Chyornaya Чёрная
- Village
- Location within Vologda Oblast Location within Russia
- Coordinates: 60°43′N 46°24′E
- Country: Russia
- Region: Vologda Oblast
- District: Velikoustyugsky District
- Time zone: UTC+3:00

Chyornaya (Russian: Чёрная) is a rural locality (a village) in Shemogodskoye Rural Settlement, Velikoustyugsky District, Vologda Oblast, Russia. The population was 17 as of 2002.

== Geography ==
Chyornaya is located 15 km southeast of Veliky Ustyug (the district's administrative centre) by road. Bakharevo is the nearest rural locality.
