= Albert Prus =

Russian footballer

Personal information
- Full name: Albert Nshanovich Prus
- Date of birth: 15 May 1987 (age 39)
- Place of birth: Sochi, Russian SFSR
- Height: 1.82 m (6 ft 0 in)
- Positions: Forward; midfielder

Senior career*
Years	Team	Apps	(Gls)
2005	FC Sochi-04	16	(1)
2006–2007	FC Mashuk Pyatigorsk	11	(0)
2008	FC Gubkin	16	(2)
2008	FC Zhemchuzhina-Sochi	13	(3)
2009	FC Agrokompleks Vyselki		
2009	FC Adler Sochi		
2012	FC Slavyane Salsky Raion		
2012–2013	FC Chernomorets Novorossiysk	30	(2)
2013–2015	FC Vityaz Krymsk	43	(5)
2015–2016	FC Angusht Nazran	21	(5)
2016–2017	FC Sochi	27	(6)
2017	FC Chernomorets Novorossiysk	18	(3)
2018	FC Medik Sochi		
- * Club domestic league appearances and goals

Albert Nshanovich Prus (Russian: Альберт Ншанович Прус; born 15 May 1987) is a Russian former football player.

== Club career ==
He made his Russian Football National League debut for FC Mashuk Pyatigorsk on 24 August 2006 in a game against FC Khimki.
