= Ilya Yurchenko =

Russian footballer

Personal information
- Full name: Ilya Gennadyevich Yurchenko
- Date of birth: 9 April 1996 (age 30)
- Place of birth: Shakhty, Russia
- Height: 1.82 m (6 ft 0 in)
- Position: Forward

Youth career
- 2012–2014: Viktor Ponedelnik Academy
- 2015: Krasnodar

Senior career*
Years	Team	Apps	(Gls)
2015–2016	Lokomotiv Liski	18	(1)
2016–2017	Afips Afipsky	23	(1)
2017–2018	Smena Komsomolsk-na-Amure	21	(8)
2018–2019	Nosta Novotroitsk	25	(9)
2019–2020	Tekstilshchik Ivanovo	27	(2)
2020–2022	Forte Taganrog	71	(16)
2023	Aluston-YUBK		
2023	Dynamo Kirov	17	(16)
2024	Amkar Perm	26	(13)
2025–2026	Khimik Dzerzhinsk	24	(20)
2026	Dynamo Vladivostok	14	(5)
- * Club domestic league appearances and goals as of 14 June 2026

Ilya Gennadyevich Yurchenko (Russian: Илья Геннадьевич Юрченко; born 9 April 1996) is a Russian football player.

== Club career ==
He made his debut in the Russian Professional Football League for Lokomotiv Liski on 11 August 2015 in a game against Vityaz Podolsk.

He made his Russian Football National League debut for Tekstilshchik Ivanovo on 7 July 2019 in a game against Yenisey Krasnoyarsk.
