= Maksim Malakhovskiy =

Russian footballer

Personal information
- Full name: Maksim Leonidovich Malakhovskiy
- Date of birth: 28 February 1984 (age 42)
- Place of birth: Novgorod, USSR
- Height: 1.80 m (5 ft 11 in)
- Positions: Forward; midfielder

Team information
- Current team: Tyumen (assistant manager)

Youth career
- Akron Veliky Novgorod

Senior career*
Years	Team	Apps	(Gls)
2001–2003	Dynamo-SPb St. Petersburg	36	(3)
2003	Spartak Lukhovitsy	15	(3)
2004–2005	Lada Tolyatti	61	(14)
2006	Fakel Voronezh	42	(2)
2007	Dynamo St. Petersburg	27	(2)
2008	Metallurg-Kuzbass Novokuznetsk	17	(0)
2008	Lada Tolyatti	14	(3)
2009	Dynamo St. Petersburg	34	(5)
2010	Okzhetpes	13	(0)
2010	Torpedo-ZIL Moscow	16	(0)
2011–2012	Ufa	36	(5)
2012–2013	Lada-Tolyatti	26	(4)
2013–2018	Zenit-Izhevsk	120	(29)
2018–2019	Syzran-2003	24	(3)
2019–2020	Akron Tolyatti	30	(3)

Managerial career
- 2022–2023: Akron Tolyatti (assistant)
- 2023–2024: Akron-2 Tolyatti
- 2024–2025: Kaluga (assistant)
- 2025: KDV Tomsk
- 2025–: Tyumen
- * Club domestic league appearances and goals

Maksim Leonidovich Malakhovskiy (Russian: Максим Леонидович Малаховский; born 28 February 1984) is a Russian professional football coach and a former player who is an assistant manager with Tyumen.

== Club career ==
He made his Russian Football National League debut for Dynamo Saint Petersburg on 1 July 2002 in a game against Lada Tolyatti.
