= FC Luki-Energiya Velikiye Luki =

Russian football club

- Full name: Football Club Luki-Energiya Velikiye Luki
- Founded: 1991
- Ground: Stadion Ekspress, Velikiye Luki
- Capacity: 2,000
- Chairman: Sergei Povareshchenkov
- Manager: Mikhail Salnikov
- League: Russian Second League, Division B, Group 2
- 2026: 4th
- Website: www.vl-energy.ru
Home colours	Away colours

FC Luki-Energiya Velikiye Luki (Russian: «Луки‑Энергия» (Великие Луки)) is a Russian football team from Velikiye Luki. It played professionally from 1997 to 2001 and again from the 2017–18 season. Their best result was 11th place in the Russian Second Division, Zone West in 1998. The club was reformed in 2014 and played on amateur levels. It received the professional license for the third-tier Russian Professional Football League for the 2017–18 season.

== Current squad ==
As of 11 September 2026, according to the Second League website.

Note: Flags indicate national team as defined under FIFA eligibility rules; some limited exceptions apply. Players may hold more than one non-FIFA nationality.

No.	Pos.	Nation	Player
2	MF	RUS	Aleksandr Seraskhov
4	DF	RUS	Vasili Lunyov
5	DF	RUS	Ilya Salnikov
6	DF	RUS	Lev Ushakhin
7	MF	RUS	Ilya Shvedyuk
8	MF	RUS	Viktor Kiselyov
9	FW	RUS	Dzhamal Dibirgadzhiyev
10	FW	RUS	Mikhail Selyukov
11	MF	RUS	Igor Shestakov
14	DF	RUS	Valentin Andyamov
17	FW	RUS	Artyom Yegorov
21	FW	RUS	Yegor Pankov

No.	Pos.	Nation	Player
22	FW	KAZ	Batyrkhan Mustafin
23	MF	RUS	Oleg Kuzmin
24	MF	RUS	Igor Bezdenezhnykh
27	MF	RUS	Aleksandr Galimov
30	GK	RUS	Dmitri Saganovich
73	FW	RUS	Gennady Nikitin
74	DF	RUS	Nikolay Edzhibiya
80	MF	RUS	Aleksey Pipo
87	FW	RUS	Mikhail Mayboroda
88	MF	RUS	Ivan Galanin
99	GK	RUS	Dmitry Melnik

== Team name history ==
- 1991: FC Ekspress Velikiye Luki
- 1992: FC SKIF-Ekspress Velikiye Luki
- 1993: FC SKIF-Yunost Velikiye Luki
- 1994–1995: FC Chayka Velikiye Luki
- 1996–2000: FC Energiya Velikiye Luki
- 2001–2002: FC Krivichi Velikiye Luki
- 2003–2005: FC Luki-SKIF Velikiye Luki
- 2014– : FC Luki-Energiya Velikiye Luki
