= Yevgeni Dudikov =

Russian professional football player

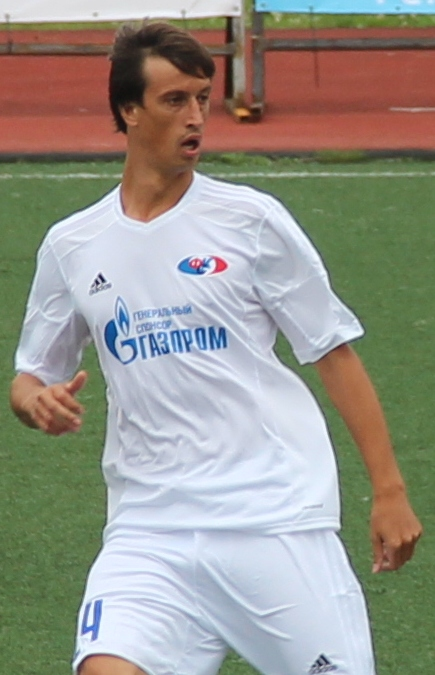

Personal information
- Full name: Yevgeni Sergeyevich Dudikov
- Date of birth: 11 March 1987 (age 39)
- Place of birth: Saratov, Russian SFSR
- Height: 1.90 m (6 ft 3 in)
- Position: Centre back

Senior career*
Years	Team	Apps	(Gls)
2007	FC Gubkin	3	(0)
2007–2009	FC Sokol-Saratov	43	(1)
2010	FC Nara-ShBFR Naro-Fominsk	27	(3)
2011	FC Radian-Baikal Irkutsk	27	(5)
2012	FC Sokol Saratov	6	(1)
2012–2013	FC Baikal Irkutsk	26	(12)
2013–2014	FC Zvezda Ryazan	28	(2)
2014	FC Sakhalin Yuzhno-Sakhalinsk	6	(0)
2015–2016	FC Sakhalin Yuzhno-Sakhalinsk	21	(2)
2016–2017	FC Tekstilshchik Ivanovo	15	(1)
2017–2019	FC Sokol Saratov	49	(18)
2019–2020	FC Akron Tolyatti	27	(2)
- * Club domestic league appearances and goals

Yevgeni Sergeyevich Dudikov (Russian: Евгений Серге́евич Дудиков; born 11 March 1987) is a Russian former professional football player.

== Club career ==
He made his Russian Football National League debut for FC Sakhalin Yuzhno-Sakhalinsk on 6 July 2014 in a game against FC Anzhi Makhachkala.
