= Dmitri Chorny =

Russian communist author (born 1975)

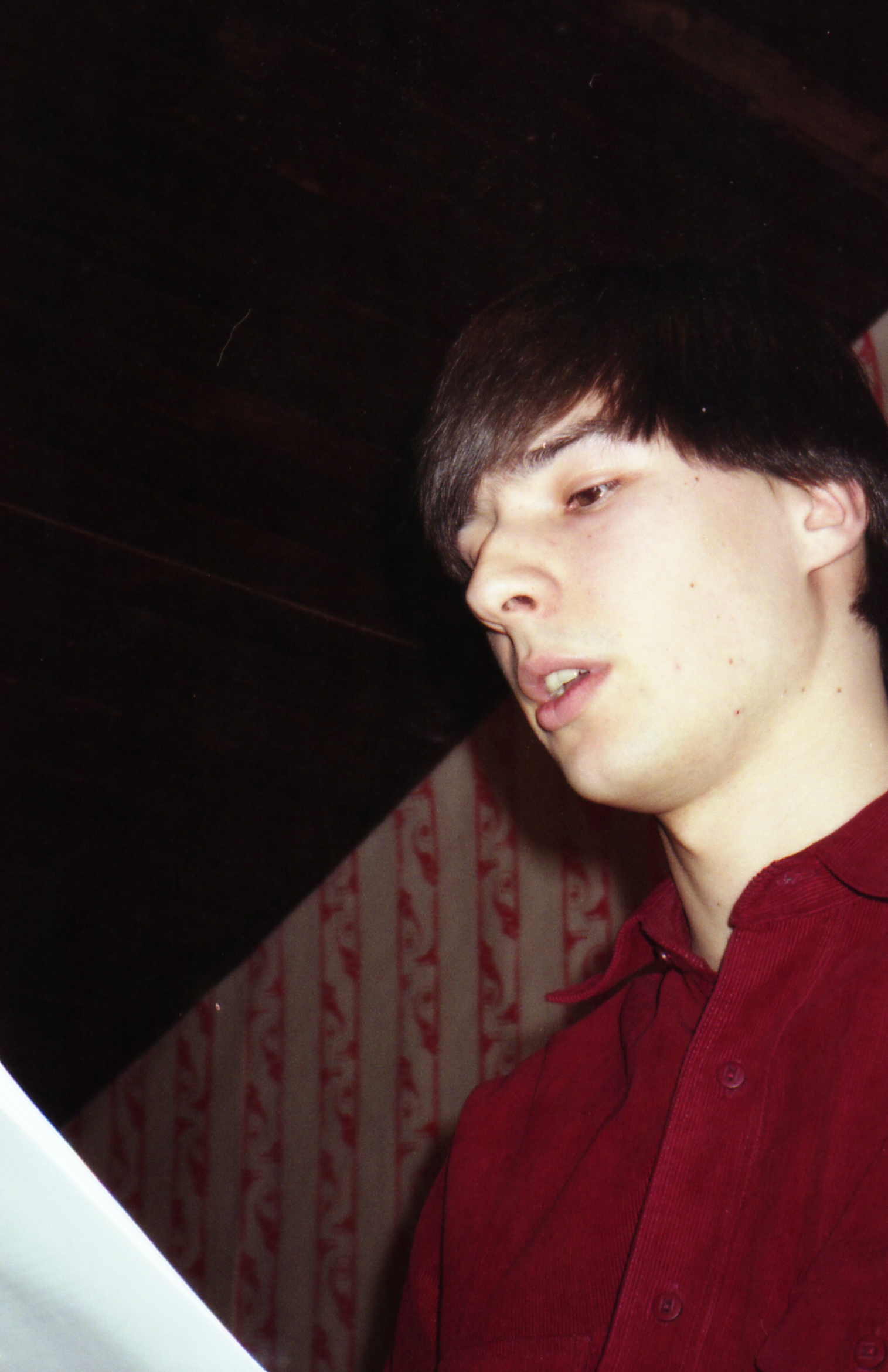
- Born: March 10, 1975; Moscow
- Education: Moscow State University of Psychology and Education
- Occupations: Poet, journalist, musician, opinion writer, prosaist,

Dmitri Vladimirovich Chorny (Russian: Дмитрий Владимирович Чёрный; born 10 March 1975 in Moscow) is a Russian historic preservation activist, journalist, poet, and writer. He is also a musician. He is a member of the United Communist Party (since 2014). He is a member of the Central Auditing Commission of the United Communist Party. He was a member of the Central Committee of the United Communist Party (2017–2018). He is the leader of a rock band and editor-in-chief of the Literary Russia.

== Biography ==
Chorny graduated from music school in piano class.

Chorny graduated from the Moscow State University of Psychology and Education. He is a psychologist. In 2000, he joined the Leninist Komsomol of the Russian Federation. He was a member of the Central Committee of the Leninist Komsomol of the Russian Federation.

He became a Clerk of the Central Committee of the Communist Party of the Russian Federation in 2001. From 2004 to 2007, he administered the official website of the Communist Party of the Russian Federation.

In 2010 he married and became a father to daughter. He published in Sovetskaya Rossiya, Nash Sovremennik. He is the author of four books of poetry (1999, 2000, 2001, 2013). He was criticized by Roman Senchin.

He was longlisted for the 2008 National Bestseller Prize. He is a "Literary Russia" newspaper award winner (2010).
