= Islam Tlupov =

Russian footballer

Personal information
- Full name: Islam Rezuanovich Tlupov
- Date of birth: 23 March 1994 (age 32)
- Place of birth: Nalchik, Russia
- Height: 1.87 m (6 ft 2 in)
- Positions: Defender; forward

Team information
- Current team: Spartak Nalchik

Youth career
- 2013–2017: Spartak Nalchik

Senior career*
Years	Team	Apps	(Gls)
2013–2017	Spartak Nalchik	50	(12)
2018	Avangard Kursk	11	(2)
2018–2020	Tom Tomsk	59	(4)
2020–2021	Slavia Mozyr	23	(3)
2021–	Spartak Nalchik	148	(31)
- * Club domestic league appearances and goals as of 31 October 2026

Islam Rezuanovich Tlupov (Russian: Ислам Резуанович Тлупов; born 23 March 1994) is a Russian football player who plays for Spartak Nalchik.

== Club career ==
He made his debut in the Russian Football National League for PFC Spartak Nalchik on 13 July 2013 in a game against FC Neftekhimik Nizhnekamsk.

He played in the 2017-18 Russian Cup final for FC Avangard Kursk on 9 May 2018 in the Volgograd Arena against 2–1 winners FC Tosno.
