= Aleksei Bayev =

Russian football player

Personal information
- Full name: Aleksei Aleksandrovich Bayev
- Date of birth: 30 May 1993 (age 33)
- Place of birth: Michurinsk, Russia
- Height: 1.81 m (5 ft 11 in)
- Position: Forward

Senior career*
Years	Team	Apps	(Gls)
2013–2019	FC Tambov	23	(1)
2016–2017	→ FC Vityaz Podolsk (loan)	23	(6)
2017–2018	→ FC Torpedo Vladimir (loan)	23	(11)
2018	→ FC Tyumen (loan)	6	(0)
2019	→ FC Ryazan (loan)	9	(2)
2019–2021	FC Veles Moscow	43	(10)
2021–2022	FC Volgar Astrakhan	25	(0)
2022–2025	FC Dynamo Vladivostok	84	(30)
2025–2026	FC Dynamo Saint Petersburg	21	(5)
- * Club domestic league appearances and goals as of 4 July 2026

Aleksei Aleksandrovich Bayev (Russian: Алексей Александрович Баев; born 30 May 1993) is a Russian football player.

== Club career ==
He made his debut in the Russian Professional Football League for FC Tambov on 24 September 2013 in a game against FC Metallurg-Oskol Stary Oskol.

He made his Russian Football National League debut for FC Tyumen on 22 July 2018 in a game against FC Nizhny Novgorod.
