= Vadim Chyorny =

Russian football player

Personal information
- Full name: Vadim Aleksandrovich Chyorny
- Date of birth: 21 June 1997 (age 29)
- Place of birth: Moscow, Russia
- Height: 1.85 m (6 ft 1 in)
- Position: Midfielder

Youth career
- FC Torpedo Moscow
- FC Dynamo Moscow

Senior career*
Years	Team	Apps	(Gls)
2017–2018	FC Volga Ulyanovsk	41	(1)
2019	FC Fakel Voronezh	5	(0)
2019–2020	FC KAMAZ Naberezhnye Chelny	16	(1)
2020–2022	FC Metallurg Lipetsk	40	(2)
2022–2023	FC Balashikha	16	(1)
- * Club domestic league appearances and goals as of 12 November 2022

Vadim Aleksandrovich Chyorny (Russian: Вадим Александрович Чёрный; born 21 June 1997) is a Russian football player.

== Club career ==
He made his debut in the Russian Professional Football League for FC Volga Ulyanovsk on 18 April 2017 in a game against FC Syzran-2003.

He made his Russian Football National League debut for FC Fakel Voronezh on 13 April 2019 in a game against FC Krasnodar-2.
