= Aleksandr Zaikin (footballer, born 1988) =

Russian footballer

Personal information
- Full name: Aleksandr Vladimirovich Zaikin
- Date of birth: 15 January 1988 (age 38)
- Place of birth: Moscow, Russian SFSR
- Height: 1.83 m (6 ft 0 in)
- Positions: Midfielder; forward

Youth career
- CSKA Moscow

Senior career*
Years	Team	Apps	(Gls)
2006–2007	Dynamo Moscow	1	(0)
2008	MVD Rossii	17	(3)
2009	Prialit Reutov		
2010	Torpedo Vladimir	24	(0)
2011	Petrotrest	17	(0)
2013	Kolomna	21	(5)
2014	Olimpia Volgograd	11	(0)
2014–2015	Domodedovo	48	(5)
2016–2018	Torpedo Vladimir	63	(8)
2018	Veles Moscow	15	(1)
2019	Volga Ulyanovsk	9	(0)
2019–2020	Kuban-Holding (amateur)		
2020–2021	Kuban-Holding	48	(8)
- * Club domestic league appearances and goals

Aleksandr Vladimirovich Zaikin (Russian: Александр Владимирович Заикин; born 15 January 1988) is a Russian former professional football player.
