= David Khubayev =

Russian footballer

Personal information
- Full name: David Anzorovich Khubayev
- Date of birth: 1 October 1994 (age 32)
- Place of birth: Saratov, Russia
- Height: 1.82 m (6 ft 0 in)
- Positions: Central midfielder; defensive midfielder

Team information
- Current team: KAMAZ Naberezhnye Chelny (on loan from Spartak Kostroma)
- Number: 2

Senior career*
Years	Team	Apps	(Gls)
2011	Stolitsa Moscow		
2012–2013	Gubkin	24	(0)
2013–2015	Sokol Saratov	49	(3)
2015–2018	KAMAZ Naberezhnye Chelny	69	(14)
2019–2023	Neftekhimik Nizhnekamsk	114	(10)
2023–2024	Akron Tolyatti	10	(1)
2024–2025	KAMAZ Naberezhnye Chelny	34	(5)
2026–	Spartak Kostroma	13	(1)
2026–	→ KAMAZ Naberezhnye Chelny (loan)	4	(0)
- * Club domestic league appearances and goals as of 6 September 2026

David Anzorovich Khubayev (Russian: Давид Анзорович Хубаев; born 1 October 1994) is a Russian football player who plays as a central midfielder or defensive midfielder for KAMAZ Naberezhnye Chelny on loan from Spartak Kostroma.

== Club career ==
He made his debut in the Russian Second Division for Gubkin on 31 July 2012 in a game against Vityaz Podolsk.

He made his Russian Football National League debut for Sokol Saratov on 6 July 2014 in a game against Yenisey Krasnoyarsk.
