= Andrei Razborov =

Russian footballer

Personal information
- Full name: Andrei Dmitriyevich Razborov
- Date of birth: 19 November 1994 (age 31)
- Place of birth: Omsk, Russia
- Height: 1.78 m (5 ft 10 in)
- Position: Forward

Team information
- Current team: FC Irtysh Omsk
- Number: 7

Youth career
- Neftyanik Omsk

Senior career*
Years	Team	Apps	(Gls)
2013–2016	FC Irtysh Omsk	61	(14)
2016–2018	FC Chita	47	(12)
2018–2020	FC Irtysh Omsk	30	(26)
2020–2022	FC Fakel Voronezh	63	(16)
2022	FC Shinnik Yaroslavl	10	(0)
2023–2024	FC Irtysh Omsk	44	(14)
2024	FC Tekstilshchik Ivanovo	4	(0)
2025	FC Dynamo Saint Petersburg	22	(4)
2026–	FC Irtysh Omsk	11	(7)
- * Club domestic league appearances and goals as of 17 October 2026

Andrei Dmitriyevich Razborov (Russian: Андрей Дмитриевич Разборов; born 19 November 1994) is a Russian football player who plays for FC Irtysh Omsk.

== Club career ==
He made his debut in the Russian Football National League for FC Fakel Voronezh on 1 August 2020 in a game against FC Akron Tolyatti, he substituted Mikhail Petrusyov in the 66th minute.
