= Yevgeni Popov (footballer) =

Russian footballer

Personal information
- Full name: Yevgeni Gennadyevich Popov
- Date of birth: 14 February 1988 (age 38)
- Place of birth: Ivanovo, Russian SFSR
- Height: 1.81 m (5 ft 11 in)
- Position: Midfielder

Senior career*
Years	Team	Apps	(Gls)
2009–2010	FC Tekstilshchik Ivanovo	41	(3)
2011–2012	FC Kooperator Vichuga		
2012–2020	FC Tekstilshchik Ivanovo	171	(28)
2021	FC Torpedo Vladimir	6	(0)
- * Club domestic league appearances and goals

Yevgeni Gennadyevich Popov (Russian: Евгений Геннадьевич Попов; born 14 February 1988) is a Russian former professional football player.

== Club career ==
He made his Russian Football National League debut for FC Tekstilshchik Ivanovo on 7 July 2019 in a game against FC Yenisey Krasnoyarsk.
