= FC Anzhi-Yunior Zelenodolsk =

Anzhi-Yunior Zelenodolsk
- Full name: FC Anzhi-Yunior Zelenodolsk
- Founded: 2017
- Dissolved: 2018
- Manager: Vacant
- League: PFL, Zone Ural-Privolzhye

FC Anzhi-Yunior Zelenodolsk (Russian: ФК «Анжи-Юниор» (Зеленодольск)) was a Russian football team based in Zelenodolsk. It was founded in 2017 as the second farm-club for FC Anzhi Makhachkala, in addition to FC Anzhi-2 Makhachkala. For 2017–18 season, it received the license for the third-tier Russian Professional Football League. During the winter break of the 2017–18 season, the club dropped out of the professional competition, accumulating large debts to players and suppliers.
