= FC Vybor-Kurbatovo Voronezh =

Russian football club

- Full name: Football Club Vybor-Kurbatovo Voronezh
- Founded: 1997
- Ground: Stadion Chayka
- Chairman: Valeri Anokhin
- Manager: N/A
- League: PFL, Zone Center
- 2013–14: Russian Amateur Football League, promoted

FC Vybor-Kurbatovo Voronezh (Russian: ФК «Выбор-Курбатово» Воронеж) is a Russian football team based in Voronezh. It was founded in 1997. In 2014–15 season, it advanced to the professional level, the third-tier Russian Professional Football League. The team withdrew from professional competition in the PFL on 13 March 2015 due to lack of financing.
