= FC Irtysh Omsk =

Russian football club

- Full name: Irtysh Football Club; Иртыш Футбольный Клуб
- Founded: 1946; 80 years ago
- Ground: Red Star Stadium, Omsk, Russia
- Capacity: 4,655
- President: Dmitri Sychev
- Manager: Sergey Konstantinov
- League: Russian Second League, Division B, Group TBC
- 2026–27: First stage: Division A, Silver Group, 7th (relegated through play-offs)
- Website: fcirtysh.ru
Home colours	Away colours

FC Irtysh Omsk (Russian: Иртыш Омск) is a Russian football club based in Omsk, Russia. It plays in the fourth-tier Russian Second League Division B.

== History ==
Their best result in the 1992 season was 2nd in the Eastern Group of the Russian First Division. It was relegated to the 3rd tier in 1995. It was promoted to 2nd tier in 1996, then relegated to 3rd in 1998. As East Zone champions, Irtysh Omsk was promoted to 2nd tier in 2009. Irtysh Omsk finished 19 out of 20 and relegated to 3rd tier.

On 15 May 2020, the 2019–20 PFL season was abandoned due to COVID-19 pandemic in Russia. As Irtysh was leading in their PFL zone at the time, they were promoted to the second-tier FNL for the 2020–21 season. The club was relegated back to PFL after one season.

The club was founded in 1946 and has been known as:

- Krylia Sovetov (Крылья Советов) in 1946–1947
- Team of the Factory Baranov (Команда Завода имени Баранова) in 1948
- Bolshevik (Большевик) in 1949
- Krasnaja Zvezda (Красная Звезда)(Red Star) in 1957
- Irtysh (Иртыш) in 1958
- Irtysh-1946 (Иртыш-1946) from 2006 to 2009

== Current squad ==
As of 11 September 2026, according to the official Second League website

Note: Flags indicate national team as defined under FIFA eligibility rules; some limited exceptions apply. Players may hold more than one non-FIFA nationality.

No.	Pos.	Nation	Player
1	GK	RUS	Nikita Yelistratov
7	FW	RUS	Andrei Razborov
9	DF	RUS	Nikita Zhustyev
8	MF	RUS	Arman Markosyan
10	MF	RUS	Roman Yanushkovsky
11	MF	RUS	Konstantin Kovalchuk
12	DF	RUS	Aleksandr Antonov
15	DF	RUS	Matvey Zhustyev
20	DF	RUS	Ilya Korobochkin

No.	Pos.	Nation	Player
23	DF	RUS	Artyom Kulakov
24	DF	RUS	Prokhor Razdymakha
25	MF	RUS	Salmon Rusyayev
27	FW	RUS	Denis Gribanov
30	MF	RUS	Platon Razdymakha
55	MF	RUS	Konstantin Shokhin
60	GK	RUS	Vladislav Poletayev
77	MF	RUS	Gevorg Galstyan
99	MF	RUS	Pavel Makarov
