= 2016–17 Russian Cup =

Tournament details
- Country: Russia

Final positions
- Champions: Lokomotiv Moscow (7th title)
- Runners-up: Ural Yekaterinburg

Tournament statistics
- Matches played: 94
- Goals scored: 232 (2.47 per match)
- Top goal scorer(s): Aleksandr Lomakin; Maxim Votinov (3 goals each)

The 2016–17 Russian Cup was the 25th season of the Russian football knockout tournament since the dissolution of Soviet Union.

The competition started on 15 July 2016. The cup champion won a spot in the 2017–18 UEFA Europa League group stage.

== First round ==
The games were played on 15 and 16 July 2016.

Ural-Povolzhye

15 July 2016	Delin-Izhevsk (5)	0–3	KAMAZ Naberezhnye Chelny (3)	Izhevsk
18:00 SAMT (UTC+4)		Match Protocol (in Russian)	Sadykov 18'; Rodionov 72'; Ayukin 90'	Stadium: Central Stadium; Attendance: 300; Referee: Andrei Hudorozhkov (Perm)

15 July 2016	Metallurg Asha (4)	1–1 (a.e.t.) (1–2 p)	Chelyabinsk (3)	Asha
19:30 YEKT (UTC+5)	Hasanov 55'	Match Protocol (in Russian)	Shaymordanov 20'	Stadium: Stadium Metallurg; Attendance: 1,000; Referee: Alexey Shishkin (Izhevsk)
	Penalties
	Kuryanov (penalty missed) (penalty scored) (penalty missed) (penalty missed)		Bryzgalov (penalty scored); Nikita Zyryanov (penalty missed); Uryvkov (penalty missed); Aleksandr Leonenkov (penalty scored)

15 July 2016	Volga Ulyanovsk (3)	2–0	Zenit Penza (3)	Ulyanovsk
18:00 SAMT (UTC+4)	Ivan Kuznetsov 20', 57'	Match Protocol (in Russian)		Stadium: Start Stadium; Attendance: 1,050; Referee: Dmitri Suhov (Nizhny Novgorod)

15 July 2016	Syzran-2003 (3)	2–0	Lada-Togliatti (3)	Syzran
19:00 SAMT (UTC+4)	Nikita Kasatkin 64'; Artyom Maslevskiy 80'	Match Protocol (in Russian)		Stadium: Stadium Kristall; Attendance: 1,500; Referee: Kirill Silantyev (Samara)

South

16 July 2016	Sochi (3)	0–1	Chayka Peschanokopskoye (3)	Sochi
18:00 MSK (UTC+3)		Match Protocol (in Russian)	Lusikyan 56' (pen.)	Stadium: Sochi Central Stadium; Attendance: 3,500; Referee: Sergei Smirnov (Kislovodsk)

West and Centre

15 July 2016	Sheksna Cherepovets (4)	3–2	Volga Tver (3)	Cherepovets
16:00 MSK (UTC+3)	Grigory Kolesnik 10'; Balashov 73', 81'	Match Protocol (in Russian)	Byrlov 44'; Starodubtsev 58'	Stadium: Stadium Metallurg; Attendance: 2,500; Referee: Maksim Chembulatov (Kostroma)

15 July 2016	Chertanovo Moscow (3)	3–2 (a.e.t.)	Kolomna (3)	Moscow
17:00 MSK (UTC+3)	Zinkovskiy 12'; Prudnikov 68', 95' (pen.)	Match Protocol (in Russian)	Arlashin 14'; Dzhigkayev 78'	Stadium: Chertanovo Arena; Attendance: 150; Referee: Stanislav Isaev (Velikiye Luki)

15 July 2016	Atom Novovoronezh (4)	1–0	Oryol (3)	Novovoronezh
18:00 MSK (UTC+3)	Sapelnikov 16'	Match Protocol (in Russian)		Stadium: Start Stadium; Attendance: 800; Referee: Vladimir Pevchev (Kursk)

15 July 2016	Saturn Ramenskoye (3)	0–1	Torpedo Moscow (3)	Ramenskoye
19:00 MSK (UTC+3)		Match Protocol (in Russian)	Sergey Shustikov 77'	Stadium: Saturn Stadium; Attendance: 6,000; Referee: Ivan Sidenkov (Saint Petersburg)

15 July 2016	Dynamo Kostroma (4)	1–3	Tekstilshchik Ivanovo (3)	Kostroma
19:00 MSK (UTC+3)	Sokolov 90'	Match Protocol (in Russian)	Shchanitsyn 33'; Sergeyev 50'; Alekseyev 66'	Stadium: Dinamo Stadium; Attendance: 500; Referee: Evgeny Kudryashov (Vologda)

16 July 2016	Murom (4)	0–2	Znamya Truda (3)	Murom
18:00 MSK (UTC+3)		Match Protocol (in Russian)	Averyanov 7'; Yerokhin 45'	Stadium: Park im. 50 let Sovetskoy Vlasti; Attendance: 2,000; Referee: Konstantin Yudanov (Moscow)

== Second round ==
The games were played on 24 and 25 July 2016.

East

25 July 2016	Dalstroyindustriya (4)	4–2 (a.e.t.)	Smena Komsomolsk-na-Amure (3)	Komsomolsk-na-Amure
18:00 VLAT (UTC+10)	Sirotin 29'; Aleksei Sabanov 78' (pen.), 113', 120'	Match Protocol (in Russian)	Buznyakov 68'; Agaronyan 88'	Stadium: Metallurg Stadium; Attendance: 500; Referee: Konstantin Molchanov (Chita)

Ural-Povolzhye

24 July 2016	Chelyabinsk (3)	1–1 (a.e.t.) (4–3 p)	Zenit-Izhevsk (3)	Chelyabinsk
17:00 YEKT (UTC+5)	Vyacheslav Steshin 34'	Match Protocol (in Russian)	Gubanov 54'	Stadium: Central Stadium; Attendance: 500; Referee: Evgeny Galimov (Yekaterinburg)
	Penalties
	Ruslan Baytukov (penalty missed); Fedosyuk (penalty scored); Nikita Zyryanov (penalty scored); Vyacheslav Steshin (penalty scored); Kirill Kholodov (penalty scored)		Gubanov (penalty scored); Chushyalov (penalty scored); Murashov (penalty missed); Vdovichenko (penalty missed); Danilov (penalty scored)

24 July 2016	Nosta Novotroitsk (3)	2–2 (a.e.t.) (9–10 p)	Syzran-2003 (3)	Novotroitsk
19:00 YEKT (UTC+5)	Samoylov 1'; Karpukhin 20'	Match Protocol (in Russian)	Vasili Berezun 51'; Maslovskiy 85'	Stadium: Metallurg Stadium; Attendance: 700; Referee: Maksim Sutormin (Nizhny Tagil)
	Penalties
	Afanasyev (penalty scored); Nechayev (penalty scored); Uan (penalty scored); Kamilov (penalty missed); Konstantin Maltsev (penalty scored); Sergei Teryokhin (penalty scored); Radchenko (penalty scored); Utyuzhnikov (penalty scored); Smirnov (penalty scored); Davidyan (penalty scored); Labutin (penalty missed)		Vasili Berezun (penalty scored); Maslovskiy (penalty scored); Nikita Kasatkin (penalty missed); Shcherbakov (penalty scored); Nikulov (penalty scored); Safronov (penalty scored); Yeremeyev (penalty scored); Yatskiy (penalty scored); Sergei Gorelov (penalty scored); Aleksandr Fomin (penalty scored); Baklov (penalty scored)

24 July 2016	Volga-Olimpiyets Nizhny Novgorod (3)	0–1	Volga Ulyanovsk (3)	Nizhny Novgorod
17:30 MSK (UTC+3)		Match Protocol (in Russian)	Nagovitsin 50'	Stadium: Lokomotiv Stadium; Attendance: 1,000; Referee: Roman Chernov (Moscow)

24 July 2016	KAMAZ Naberezhnye Chelny (3)	1–0 (a.e.t.)	Dynamo Kirov (3)	Naberezhnye Chelny
18:00 MSK (UTC+3)	Maksimov 120+2'	Match Protocol (in Russian)		Stadium: KAMAZ Stadium; Attendance: 1,500; Referee: Anton Batalov (Izhevsk)

South

24 July 2016	Legion-Dynamo Makhachkala (3)	2–1	Alania Vladikavkaz (3)	Makhachkala
16:00 MSK (UTC+3)	Korgoloyev 62'; Udunyan 68'	Match Protocol (in Russian)	Mistulov 55'	Stadium: Dynamo Stadium; Attendance: 1,500; Referee: Aleksandr Gurenko (Astrakhan)

24 July 2016	Druzhba Maykop (3)	0–2	Afips Afipsky (3)	Maykop
17:00 MSK (UTC+3)		Match Protocol (in Russian)	Yurchenko 20'; Yakovlev 64'	Stadium: Druzhba Stadium; Attendance: 400; Referee: Dmitri Streltsov (Rostov-on-Don)

24 July 2016	Chayka Peschanokopskoye (3)	0–1	Chernomorets Novorossiysk (3)	Peschanokopskoye
17:30 MSK (UTC+3)		Match Protocol (in Russian)	Ridel 81' (pen.)	Stadium: Central Stadium; Attendance: 1,200; Referee: Vitali Faustov (Stary Oskol)

24 July 2016	SKA Rostov-on-Don (3)	2–2 (a.e.t.) (5–4 p)	Dynamo Stavropol (3)	Bataisk
17:30 MSK (UTC+3)	Farkhad Gystarov 25'; Yevgeni Lazarev 90+4'	Match Protocol (in Russian)	Selemenev 14'; Golishchev 35'	Stadium: Lokomotiv Stadium; Attendance: 300; Referee: Yunus Koshko (Belorechensk)
	Penalties
	Gevorkyan (penalty scored); Pravilo (penalty scored); Yevgeni Lazarev (penalty missed); Gystarov (penalty missed); Soldatenko (penalty scored); Rudenko (penalty scored); Khinchagov (penalty scored)		Sergei Yartsev (penalty missed); Golishchev (penalty scored); Yanovskiy (penalty scored); Khugayev (penalty scored); Serdyukov (penalty missed); Lyuft (penalty scored); Kurbanov (penalty missed)

24 July 2016	Mashuk-KMV Pyatigorsk (3)	2–0	Angusht Nazran (3)	Pyatigorsk
18:30 MSK (UTC+3)	Denis Rodionov 6'; Kaydash 45' (pen.)	Match Protocol (in Russian)		Stadium: Central Stadium; Attendance: 200; Referee: Evgeny Khomchenko (Astrakhan)

24 July 2016	Armavir (3)	0–1	Biolog-Novokubansk (3)	Armavir
19:00 MSK (UTC+3)		Match Protocol (in Russian)	Gudayev 19' (pen.)	Stadium: Yunost Stadium; Attendance: 1,100; Referee: Vitalii Ermakov (Krasnodar)

West and Centre

24 July 2016	Kaluga (3)	5–1	Strogino Moscow (3)	Kaluga
14:00 MSK (UTC+3)	Losev 2', 30'; Syomin 28'; Rodin 56'; Dubrovin 58' (pen.)	Match Protocol (in Russian)	Ovsyannikov 78' (pen.)	Stadium: Arena Annenki; Attendance: 1,300; Referee: Ilya Trishin (Balashikha)

24 July 2016	FSK Dolgoprudny (3)	1–0	Chertanovo Moscow (3)	Dolgoprudny
16:00 MSK (UTC+3)	Rogov 68'	Match Protocol (in Russian)		Stadium: Salyut Stadium; Attendance: 1,000; Referee: Petr Miroshnichenko (Saint Petersburg)

24 July 2016	Torpedo Moscow (3)	2–2 (a.e.t.) (4–2 p)	Ryazan (3)	Moscow
17:00 MSK (UTC+3)	Dvoretskov 6'; Seryogin 116'	Match Protocol (in Russian)	Meshcheryakov 82'; Zhuravlyov 101'	Stadium: Akademia Spartak po Futbolu imeni F.F. Cherenkova; Attendance: 700; Referee: Maksim Perezva (Ramenskoye)
	Penalties
	Sokolov (penalty scored); Sadykhov (penalty scored); Kertanov (penalty scored); Kosyanchuk (penalty scored)		Zhdankin (penalty scored); Meshcheryakov (penalty missed); Mitin (penalty missed); Baulchev (penalty scored)

24 July 2016	Vityaz Podolsk (3)	0–0 (a.e.t.) (5–3 p)	Domodedovo Moscow (3)	Podolsk
17:00 MSK (UTC+3)		Match Protocol (in Russian)		Stadium: Trud Stadium; Attendance: 700; Referee: Alexey Kuznetsov (Ivanovo)
	Penalties
	Chasovskikh (penalty scored); Yuryev (penalty scored); Anisimov (penalty scored); Voronin (penalty scored); Semyonov (penalty scored)		Agaptsev (penalty scored); Kirsanov (penalty scored); Bolshakov (penalty missed); Yerkin (penalty scored)

24 July 2016	Solyaris Moscow (3)	3–1	Sheksna Cherepovets (4)	Moscow
17:00 MSK (UTC+3)	Gorbunov 6'; Polin 72'; Danilin 75'	Match Protocol (in Russian)	German Felk 31'	Stadium: Stadion Spartakoviets; Attendance: 200; Referee: Denis Savin (Leningrad Oblast)

24 July 2016	CRFSO Smolensk (3)	1–0	Pskov-747 (3)	Smolensk
17:00 MSK (UTC+3)	Rychenkov 47'	Match Protocol (in Russian)		Stadium: SGAFKST; Attendance: 1,200; Referee: Konstantin Averyanov (Saint Petersburg)

24 July 2016	Zvezda Saint Petersburg (4)	0–1	Dynamo Saint Petersburg (3)	Saint Petersburg
17:00 MSK (UTC+3)		Match Protocol (in Russian)	Kulishev 90+4'	Stadium: Petrovsky Stadium, Small sports arena Attendance: 1,200; Referee: Ivan Sarayev (Saint Petersburg)

24 July 2016	Znamya Truda (3)	0–1	Torpedo Vladimir (3)	Orekhovo-Zuyevo
17:00 MSK (UTC+3)		Match Protocol (in Russian)	Ovechkin 26'	Stadium: Znamya Truda Stadium; Attendance: 1,000; Referee: Denis Zabotin (Moscow)

24 July 2016	Tekstilshchik Ivanovo (3)	3–1	Spartak Kostroma (3)	Ivanovo
18:00 MSK (UTC+3)	Shchanitsyn 60'; Sergeyev 65'; Belevitin 87'	Match Protocol (in Russian)	Goryushkin 8'	Stadium: Tekstilshchik Stadium; Attendance: 3,100; Referee: Ilya Parfentiev (Saint Petersburg)

24 July 2016	Dynamo Bryansk (3)	2–0	Avangard Kursk (3)	Bryansk
18:30 MSK (UTC+3)	Sergei Sinyayev 41'; Avramenko 46'	Match Protocol (in Russian)		Stadium: Dynamo Stadium; Attendance: 2,500; Referee: Artem Reket (Moscow)

24 July 2016	Energomash Belgorod (3)	2–2 (a.e.t.) (2–1 p)	Rotor Volgograd (3)	Belgorod
19:00 MSK (UTC+3)	Ageyev 64', 113'	Match Protocol (in Russian)	Viktor Garayev 52'; Zhdanov 99'	Stadium: Salyut Stadium; Attendance: 3,000; Referee: Igor Vertkov (Moscow)
	Penalties
	Kalugin (penalty scored); Faskhutdinov (penalty missed); Vasilyev (penalty missed); Burchenko (penalty scored); Samsonov (penalty missed)		Viktor Garayev (penalty missed); Kaloshin (penalty missed); Zolotov (penalty scored); Sidorichev (penalty missed); Borisov (penalty missed)

== Third round ==
The games were played on 1 August and 7–8 August 2016.

East

1 August 2016	Sakhalin Yuzhno-Sakhalinsk (3)	2–0 (a.e.t.)	Dalstroyindustriya (4)	Yuzhno-Sakhalinsk
19:00 MAGT (UTC+11)	Matrakhov 96'; Pugachyov 103'	Match Protocol (in Russian)		Stadium: Spartak Stadium; Referee: Igor Baranov (Krasnoyarsk)

1 August 2016	Chita (3)	5–2	Zenit-Radian Irkutsk (3)	Chita
19:00 YAKT (UTC+9)	Fatikhov 28'; Razborov 35', 53'; Narylkov 45'; Maksim Yeruslanov 49'	Match Protocol (in Russian)	Khleborodov 49'; Gandilyan 51'	Stadium: Lokomotiv Stadium; Referee: Vladimir Lapkin (Kemerovo)

1 August 2016	Irtysh Omsk (3)	0–2	Dynamo Barnaul (3)	Omsk
18:00 OMST (UTC+6)		Match Protocol (in Russian)	Zavyalov 51', 59'	Stadium: Red Star Stadium; Referee: Mikhail Kazantsev (Gorno-Altaysk)

South

7 August 2016	Legion-Dynamo Makhachkala (3)	3–0	Mashuk-KMV Pyatigorsk (3)	Makhachkala
16:00 MSK (UTC+3)	K. Kurbanov 46'; G. Kurbanov 63'; Zagirov 89'	Match Protocol (in Russian)		Stadium: Dynamo Stadium; Attendance: 850; Referee: Dmitri Streltsov (Rostov-on-Don)

8 August 2016	Biolog-Novokubansk (3)	2–0	SKA Rostov-on-Don (3)	Novokubansk
17:00 MSK (UTC+3)	Gudayev 50'; Sokolov 74'	Match Protocol (in Russian)		Stadium: Progress Stadium; Attendance: 500; Referee: Andrei Yudin (Volgograd)

8 August 2016	Chernomorets Novorossiysk (3)	1–0	Afips Afipsky (3)	Novorossiysk
19:00 MSK (UTC+3)	Vitali Kirichenko 66'	Match Protocol (in Russian)		Stadium: Central Stadium; Attendance: 1,500; Referee: Vitali Ermakov (Krasnodar)

West and Centre

7 August 2016	Vityaz Podolsk (3)	3–5	Kaluga (3)	Podolsk
17:00 MSK (UTC+3)	Cheminava 52'; Chasovskikh 69'; Yuryev 74'	Match Protocol (in Russian)	Rodin 8', 23'; Oganesyan 13'; Syomin 16'; Anokhin 79'	Stadium: Trud Stadium; Attendance: 500; Referee: Anton Frolov (Moscow)

7 August 2016	Dynamo Saint Petersburg (3)	0–1 (a.e.t.)	FSK Dolgoprudny (3)	Saint Petersburg
18:00 MSK (UTC+3)		Match Protocol (in Russian)	Rogov 100'	Stadium: Petrovsky Stadium; Attendance: 700; Referee: Yurii Karpov (Petrozavodsk)

7 August 2016	Metallurg Lipetsk (3)	1–1 (a.e.t.) (3–4 p)	Energomash Belgorod (3)	Lipetsk
18:00 MSK (UTC+3)	A. Titov 90+2'	Match Protocol (in Russian)	Burchenko 62' (pen.)	Stadium: Metallurg Stadium; Attendance: 1,500; Referee: Artyom Reket (Moscow)
	Penalties
	Kharin (penalty scored); Belousov (penalty scored); Kozhemyakin (penalty missed); A. Titov (penalty scored); Viktorov (penalty missed)		Kalugin (penalty scored); Ageyev (penalty missed); Burchenko (penalty scored); Samsonov (penalty scored); Tonkikh (penalty scored)

7 August 2016	Tekstilshchik Ivanovo (3)	1–0	Solyaris Moscow (3)	Ivanovo
18:00 MSK (UTC+3)	Alekseyev 6'	Match Protocol (in Russian)		Stadium: Tekstilshchik Stadium; Attendance: 3,700; Referee: Ilya Bugrov (Rybinsk)

7 August 2016	Torpedo Vladimir (3)	0–1	CRFSO Smolensk (3)	Vladimir
18:00 MSK (UTC+3)		Match Protocol (in Russian)	Dubchak 90+3'	Stadium: Torpedo Stadium; Attendance: 750; Referee: Artyom Smolin (Vologda)

7 August 2016	Torpedo Moscow (3)	2–0	Dynamo Bryansk (3)	Moscow
19:00 MSK (UTC+3)	Gonezhukov 73', 90'	Match Protocol (in Russian)		Stadium: Spartak Stadium Academy imena F.F.Cherenkova; Attendance: 550; Referee: Oleg Evstigneev (Korolyov)

Ural-Povolzhye

7 August 2016	Volga Ulyanovsk (3)	2–1	Syzran-2003 (3)	Ulyanovsk
18:00 SAMT (UTC+4)	Valeri Zakharov 10'; Nikulov 90' (o.g.)	Match Protocol (in Russian)	Vasili Berezun 12'	Stadium: Start Stadium; Attendance: 1100; Referee: Ranaeli Zinyakov (Naberezhnye Chelny)

7 August 2016	KAMAZ Naberezhnye Chelny (3)	0–2	Chelyabinsk (3)	Naberezhnye Chelny
18:00 MSK (UTC+3)		Match Protocol (in Russian)	Nikita Zyryanov 74'; Pechyonkin 87'	Stadium: KAMAZ Stadium; Attendance: 700; Referee: Kirill Silantyev (Samara)

== Fourth round ==
The games were played on 24 and 25 August 2016.

24 August 2016	Sakhalin Yuzhno-Sakhalinsk (3)	1–2	SKA-Khabarovsk (2)	Yuzhno-Sakhalinsk
18:00 MAGT (UTC+11)	Volkov 13'	Match Protocol (in Russian)	Kalinsky 59'; Dimidko 74'	Stadium: Spartak Stadium; Attendance: 1,800; Referee: Artyom Petrenko (Novosibirsk)

24 August 2016	Tyumen (2)	0–1	Sibir Novosibirsk (2)	Chelyabinsk
13:00 YEKT (UTC+5)		Match Protocol (in Russian)	Votinov 74'	Stadium: Central Stadium; Attendance: 200; Referee: Igor Panin (Dmitrov)

24 August 2016	Chita (3)	1–0	Luch-Energiya Vladivostok (2)	Chita
18:00 YAKT (UTC+9)	Fatikhov 29'	Match Protocol (in Russian)		Stadium: Lokomotiv Stadium; Attendance: 5,400; Referee: Anton Anopa (Blagoveshchensk)

24 August 2016	Dynamo Barnaul (3)	0–3	Yenisey Krasnoyarsk (2)	Barnaul
18:30 KRAT (UTC+7)		Match Protocol (in Russian)	Lomakin 7', 34'; Lanin 58'	Stadium: Dynamo Stadium; Attendance: 8,000; Referee: Aleksei Avtukhovich (Chelyabinsk)

24 August 2016	Legion-Dynamo Makhachkala (3)	1–2	Volgar Astrakhan (2)	Makhachkala
16:00 MSK (UTC+3)	Udunyan 9'	Match Protocol (in Russian)	Mashukov 64'; Kabutov 77'	Stadium: Dynamo Stadium; Referee: Dmitri Nedvizhay (Stavropol)

24 August 2016	Chelyabinsk (3)	2–0	Neftekhimik Nizhnekamsk (2)	Chelyabinsk
18:00 YEKT (UTC+5)	Bystrov 2'; Shaymordanov 58'	Match Protocol (in Russian)		Stadium: Central Stadium; Attendance: 2,000; Referee: Stanislav Vasilyev (Izhevsk)

24 August 2016	Biolog-Novokubansk (3)	0–2	Spartak Nalchik (2)	Novokubansk
16:30 MSK (UTC+3)		Match Protocol (in Russian)	Bazhev 51' (pen.); Dashayev 86'	Stadium: Biolog Stadium; Attendance: 700; Referee: Lasha Verulidze (Vladikavkaz)

24 August 2016	Torpedo Moscow (3)	1–2	Mordovia Saransk (2)	Moscow
17:00 MSK (UTC+3)	Dvoretskov 38'	Match Protocol (in Russian)	Lukyanov 5'; Petrov 58'	Stadium: Spartak Stadium; Attendance: 1,500; Referee: Artyom Lyubimov (Saint Petersburg)

24 August 2016	Volga Ulyanovsk (3)	1–0	Sokol Saratov (2)	Ulyanovsk
18:00 SAMT (UTC+4)	Georgi Zaikin 31'	Match Protocol (in Russian)		Stadium: Trud Stadium; Attendance: 2,800; Referee: Sergei Kulikov (Saransk)

24 August 2016	FSK Dolgoprudny (3)	0–1	Tosno (2)	Dolgoprudny
18:00 MSK (UTC+3)		Match Protocol (in Russian)	Prychynenko 11'	Stadium: Salyut Stadium; Attendance: 2,500; Referee: Maksim Nebogatikov (Kazan)

24 August 2016	Tekstilshchik Ivanovo (3)	0–1	Khimki (2)	Ivanovo
18:00 MSK (UTC+3)		Match Protocol (in Russian)	Akhba 89'	Stadium: Tekstilshchik Stadium; Attendance: 7,100; Referee: Gennadi Anoshin (Saint Petersburg)

24 August 2016	Kaluga (3)	1–3	Tambov (2)	Kaluga
18:00 MSK (UTC+3)	Dmitri Baranov 26'	Match Protocol (in Russian)	Alumona 47', 86'; Poyarkov 83'	Stadium: Annenki Arena; Attendance: 2,200; Referee: Vasili Kazartsev (Saint Petersburg)

24 August 2016	CRFSO Smolensk (3)	0–1	Shinnik Yaroslavl (2)	Smolensk
18:30 MSK (UTC+3)		Match Protocol (in Russian)	Mitasov 90'	Stadium: FGOU VPO SGAFKST Stadium; Attendance: 2,000; Referee: Aleksei Amelin (Tula)

24 August 2016	Energomash Belgorod (3)	3–0	Kuban Krasnodar (2)	Belgorod
19:00 MSK (UTC+3)	Kolesnikov 14'; Samoylov 49'; Sergeyev 51'	Match Protocol (in Russian)		Stadium: Energomash Stadium; Attendance: 8,000; Referee: Yevgeni Kukulyak (Kaluga)

24 August 2016	Chernomorets Novorossiysk (3)	0–1 (a.e.t.)	Fakel Voronezh (2)	Novorossiysk
19:00 MSK (UTC+3)		Match Protocol (in Russian)	Garakoyev 109'	Stadium: Central Stadium; Attendance: 3,500; Referee: Pavel Shadykhanov (Moscow)

25 August 2016	Baltika Kaliningrad (2)	1–3 (a.e.t.)	Dynamo Moscow (2)	Kaliningrad
17:00 USZ1 (UTC+2)	Al. Yeliseyev 50'	Match Protocol (in Russian)	Lutsenko 43'; Holmén 108'; Kuzmin 120'	Stadium: Baltika Stadium; Attendance: 7,300; Referee: Denis Shpilyov (Belgorod)

== Bracket ==
Round of 32
Dynamo Moscow	4
Rostov	0
Tosno	2
Arsenal Tula	0
Khimki	0
Lokomotiv Moscow	3
Shinnik Yaroslavl	0
Krylia Sovetov Samara	2
Tambov	0
Zenit Saint Petersburg	5
Mordovia Saransk	1
Anzhi Makhachkala	2
Fakel Voronezh	1 (3)
Terek Grozny (pen)	1 (5)
Energomash Belgorod	1 (3)
Ufa (pen)	1 (5)
Spartak Nalchik	0
Krasnodar	2
Volgar Astrakhan	0
Orenburg	1
Chelyabinsk	0
Ural Yekaterinburg	3
Volga Ulyanovsk	0 (3)
Amkar Perm (pen)	0 (4)
Yenisey Krasnoyarsk	2
CSKA Moscow	1
Sibir Novosibirsk (aet)	1
Tom Tomsk	0
SKA-Khabarovsk	1
Spartak Moscow	0
Chita	0
Rubin Kazan	1

Round of 16
Dynamo Moscow	2
Tosno	3
Lokomotiv Moscow	3
Krylia Sovetov Samara	1
Zenit Saint Petersburg	0
Anzhi Makhachkala	4
Terek Grozny	1 (3)
Ufa (pen)	1 (4)
Krasnodar (aet)	3
Orenburg	2
Ural Yekaterinburg (pen)	1 (4)
Amkar Perm	1 (2)
Yenisey Krasnoyarsk	2
Sibir Novosibirsk (aet)	3
SKA-Khabarovsk	0
Rubin Kazan (aet)	1

Quarterfinals
Tosno	0
Lokomotiv Moscow	1
Anzhi Makhachkala	0
Ufa	1
Krasnodar	3 (3)
Ural Yekaterinburg (pen)	3 (4)
Sibir Novosibirsk	0
Rubin Kazan	1

Semifinals
Lokomotiv Moscow	1
Ufa	0
Ural Yekaterinburg	2
Rubin Kazan	1

Finals
Lokomotiv Moscow	2
Ural Yekaterinburg	0

== Round of 32 ==
Teams from the Premier League enter the competition at this round. The games were played on 21 and 22 September 2016.

21 September 2016	SKA-Khabarovsk (2)	1–0	Spartak Moscow (1)	Khabarovsk
19:00 VLAT (UTC+10)	Nikiforov 58'	Match Protocol (in Russian)		Stadium: Lenin Stadium; Attendance: 13,000; Referee: Artyom Chistyakov (Azov)

21 September 2016	Sibir Novosibirsk (2)	1–0 (a.e.t.)	Tom Tomsk (1)	Novosibirsk
17:00 KRAT (UTC+7)	Kachan 118'	Match Protocol (in Russian)		Stadium: Spartak Stadium; Attendance: 3,100; Referee: Anton Anopa (Blagoveshchensk)

21 September 2016	Dynamo Moscow (2)	4–0	Rostov (1)	Khimki
14:00 MSK (UTC+3)	Rykov 6'; Gueye 18' (o.g.); Markelov 45+1'; Temnikov 90+2'	Match Protocol		Stadium: Arena Khimki; Attendance: 3,473; Referee: Vladimir Seldyakov (Balashikha)

21 September 2016	Chelyabinsk (3)	0–3	Ural Yekaterinburg (1)	Chelyabinsk
16:00 YEKT (UTC+5)		Match Protocol (in Russian)	Chanturia 15', 50'; Konaté 35'	Stadium: Central Stadium; Attendance: 4,500; Referee: Yuri Aponasenko (Moscow)

21 September 2016	Yenisey Krasnoyarsk (2)	2–1	CSKA Moscow (1)	Krasnoyarsk
19:00 KRAT (UTC+7)	Chernov 43'; Lomakin 83'	Match Protocol (in Russian)	Milanov 58'	Stadium: Central Stadium; Attendance: 16,100; Referee: Nikolai Voloshin (Smolensk)

21 September 2016	Spartak Nalchik (2)	0–2	Krasnodar (1)	Nalchik
17:00 MSK (UTC+3)		Match Protocol (in Russian)	Ari 48'; Laborde 86'	Stadium: Spartak Stadium; Attendance: 1,000; Referee: Aleksei Sukhoy (Lyubertsy)

21 September 2016	Volga Ulyanovsk (3)	0–0 (a.e.t.) (3–4 p)	Amkar Perm (1)	Ulyanovsk
18:00 SAMT (UTC+4)		Match Protocol (in Russian)		Stadium: Start Stadium; Attendance: 3,100; Referee: Timur Arslanbekov (Moscow)
	Penalties
	Yefim Shanin (penalty scored); Igor Bugayenko (penalty scored); Nagovitsin (penalty missed); Aleksei Tsygantsov (penalty scored); Khayrullov (penalty missed)		(penalty scored) Zanev; (penalty scored) Jovičić; (penalty scored) Shynder; (penalty scored) Gigolayev

21 September 2016	Volgar Astrakhan (2)	0–1	Orenburg (1)	Astrakhan
19:00 SAMT (UTC+4)	Match Protocol (in Russian)		Sanaya 83'	Stadium: Central Stadium; Attendance: 2,500; Referee: Igor Fedotov (Moscow)

21 September 2016	Tosno (2)	2–0	Arsenal Tula (1)	Veliky Novgorod
18:30 MSK (UTC+3)	Paliyenko 10'; Abazov 86'	Match Protocol (in Russian)		Stadium: Elektron Stadium; Attendance: 2,400; Referee: Pavel Kukuyan (Sochi)

21 September 2016	Mordovia Saransk (2)	1–2	Anzhi Makhachkala (1)	Saransk
18:30 MSK (UTC+3)	Lukyanov 87'	Match Protocol (in Russian)	Iličević 6'; Moutari 45+3'	Stadium: Start Stadium; Attendance: 920; Referee: Oleg Sokolov (Voronezh)

21 September 2016	Energomash Belgorod (3)	1–1 (a.e.t.) (3–5 p)	Ufa (1)	Belgorod
19:00 MSK (UTC+3)	Abdulavov 9' (o.g.)	Match Protocol (in Russian)	Marcinho 18' (pen.)	Stadium: Energomash Stadium; Attendance: 9,000; Referee: Lasha Verulidze (Vladikavkaz)
	Penalties
	Belobayev (penalty scored); Saplinov (penalty scored); Semeykin (penalty missed); Sergeyev (penalty scored)		(penalty scored) Krotov; (penalty scored) Sysuyev; (penalty scored) Diego Carlos; (penalty scored) Abdulavov; (penalty scored) Tumasyan

21 September 2016	Fakel Voronezh (2)	1–1 (a.e.t.) (3–5 p)	Terek Grozny (1)	Voronezh
19:00 MSK (UTC+3)	Troshechkin 33'	Match Protocol (in Russian)	Lebedenko 57'	Stadium: Tsentralnyi Profsoyuz Stadion; Attendance: 8,700; Referee: Stanislav Vasilyev (Izhevsk)
	Penalties
	Bolov (penalty scored); Solovyov (penalty missed); Troshechkin (penalty scored); Drannikov (penalty scored)		(penalty scored) Ivanov; (penalty scored) Torje; (penalty scored) Semyonov; (penalty scored) Ángel; (penalty scored) Grozav

21 September 2016	Khimki (2)	0–3	Lokomotiv Moscow (1)	Khimki
20:00 MSK (UTC+3)		Match Protocol (in Russian)	Kasaev 44'; I. Chernyshov 53' (o.g.); Portnyagin 63'	Stadium: Rodina Stadium; Attendance: 2,000; Referee: Vasili Kazartsev (Saint Petersburg)

22 September 2016	Chita (3)	0–1	Rubin Kazan (1)	Chita
17:00 YAKT (UTC+9)		Match Protocol (in Russian)	Dević 22'	Stadium: Lokomotiv Stadium; Attendance: 8,800; Referee: Igor Panin (Dmitrov)

22 September 2016	FC Tambov (2)	0–5	Zenit Saint Petersburg (1)	Tambov
14:00 MSK (UTC+3)		Match Protocol (in Russian)	Mak 29'; Shatov 47'; Kokorin 61'; Đorđević 77'; Giuliano 84'	Stadium: Spartak Stadium; Attendance: 5,500; Referee: Sergei Kulikov (Saransk)

22 September 2016	Shinnik Yaroslavl (2)	0–2	Krylia Sovetov Samara (1)	Yaroslavl
18:30 MSK (UTC+3)		Match Protocol (in Russian)	Kornilenko 32'; Tkachyov 56'	Stadium: Shinnik Stadium; Attendance: 1,200; Referee: Denis Shpilyov (Belgorod)

== Round of 16 ==
The games were played on 26 and 27 October 2016.

26 October 2016	Yenisey Krasnoyarsk (2)	2–3 (a.e.t.)	Sibir Novosibirsk (2)	Krasnoyarsk
19:00 KRAT (UTC+7)	Gultyayev 60'; Maloyan 91'	Match Protocol (in Russian)	Belyayev 62' (pen.); Votinov 97', 105'	Stadium: Central Stadium; Attendance: 5,000; Referee: Igor Fedotov (Moscow)

26 October 2016	Amkar Perm (1)	1–1 (a.e.t.) (2–4 p)	Ural Yekaterinburg (1)	Perm
19:00 YEKT (UTC+5)	Gigolayev 74'	Match Protocol (in Russian)	Fontanello 38'	Stadium: Zvezda Stadium; Attendance: 5,100; Referee: Roman Galimov (Ulan-Ude)
	Penalties
	Zanev (penalty scored); Gigolayev (penalty missed); Jovičić (penalty scored); Prokofyev (penalty missed)		(penalty scored) Chanturia; (penalty scored) Fontanello; (penalty scored) Podoksyonov; (penalty scored) Lungu

26 October 2016	Tosno (2)	3–2	Dynamo Moscow (2)	Veliky Novgorod
19:00 MSK (UTC+3)	Galiulin 22'; Mukhametshin 45+2'; Kireyenko 88'	Match Protocol (in Russian)	Panchenko 54'; Bećiraj 85'	Stadium: Elektron Stadium; Attendance: 2,750; Referee: Mikhail Vilkov (Nizhny Novgorod)

26 October 2016	Terek Grozny (1)	1–1 (a.e.t.) (3–4 p)	Ufa (1)	Grozny
19:00 MSK (UTC+3)	Roshi 53'	Match Protocol (in Russian)	Igboun 13'	Stadium: Akhmat-Arena; Attendance: 11,250; Referee: Artyom Chistyakov (Azov)
	Penalties
	Balaj (penalty scored); Píriz (penalty missed); Semyonov (penalty missed); Rodolfo (penalty scored); Grozav (penalty scored)		(penalty scored) Fatai; (penalty scored) Igboun; (penalty scored) Marcinho; (penalty missed) Stotsky; (penalty scored) Zaseyev

26 October 2016	Rubin Kazan (1)	1–0 (a.e.t.)	SKA-Khabarovsk (2)	Kazan
19:00 MSK (UTC+3)	Samu 118'	Match Protocol (in Russian)		Stadium: Kazan Arena; Attendance: 4,360; Referee: Aleksei Sukhoy (Lyubertsy)

27 October 2016	Anzhi Makhachkala (1)	4–0	Zenit Saint Petersburg (1)	Kaspiysk
18:00 MSK (UTC+3)	Gasanov 29'; Budkivskyi 62', 69'; Berisha 79'	Match Protocol (in Russian)		Stadium: Anzhi Arena; Attendance: 6,100; Referee: Vladimir Moskalyov (Voronezh)

27 October 2016	Krylia Sovetov Samara (1)	1–3	Lokomotiv Moscow (1)	Samara
19:00 SAMT (UTC+4)	Chochiyev 75'	Match Protocol (in Russian)	Maicon 19'; Samedov 50'; Fernandes 63'	Stadium: Metallurg Stadium; Attendance: 4,841; Referee: Vladimir Seldyakov (Balashikha)

27 October 2016	Krasnodar (1)	3–2 (a.e.t.)	Orenburg (1)	Krasnodar
19:00 MSK (UTC+3)	Granqvist 57', 100'; Izmailov 67'	Match Protocol (in Russian)	Breyev 55'; Oyewole 59'	Stadium: Krasnodar Stadium; Attendance: 18,236; Referee: Evgeny Turbin (Moscow)

== Quarter-finals ==
The games were played on 28 February and 1 March 2017.

28 February 2017	Ural Yekaterinburg (1)	3–3 (a.e.t.) (4–3 p)	Krasnodar (1)	Krasnodar
23:30	Ilyin 35'; Bicfalvi 53', 65'	Report	Smolov 2'; Claesson 14', 33'	Stadium: Krasnodar Stadium; Attendance: 10,251; Referee: Kirill Levnikov

1 March 2017	Rubin Kazan (1)	1–0	Sibir Novoribirsk (2)	Kazan
19:00	Jonathas 88'	Report		Stadium: Central Stadium; Attendance: 2,346; Referee: Evgeny Turbin

1 March 2017	Ufa (1)	1–0	Anzhi Makhachkala (1)	Ufa
21:00	Zaseyev 66'	Report		Stadium: Neftyanik Stadium; Attendance: 8,400; Referee: Roman Galimov

1 March 2017	Lokomotiv Moscow (1)	1–0	Tosno (2)	Moscow
23:30	Al. Miranchuk 19'	Report		Stadium: Lokomotiv Stadium; Attendance: 7,659; Referee: Artem Chistyakov

== Semi-finals ==
The games were played on 5 and 6 April 2017.

5 April 2017
23:30

Lokomotiv Moscow (1)	1–0	Ufa (1)
Manuel Fernandes 44'	Report

Lokomotiv Stadium, Moscow, Moscow
Attendance: 9,851
Referee: Aleksandr Yegorov
6 April 2017
21:00

Ural Yekaterinburg (1)	2–1	Rubin Kazan (1)
Ilyin 13'; Novikov 58'	Report	Jonathas 31'

SKB-Bank Arena, Yekaterinburg, Yekaterinburg
Attendance: 8,350
Referee: Aleksei Eskov

== Final ==
2 May 2017
18:45 MSK (UTC+3)

Ural Yekaterinburg	0–2	Lokomotiv Moscow
	Summary	Denisov 76'; Al. Miranchuk 90'

Fisht Olympic Stadium, Sochi
Attendance: 24,500
Referee: Aleksei Nikolaev
