= 2009 FC Moscow season =

Moscow
2009 season
- Manager: Miodrag Božović
- Stadium: Eduard Streltsov Stadium
- Premier League: 6th
- Russian Cup: Semifinal vs Rubin Kazan
- Russian Cup: Withdrawn prior to the Quarterfinal
- Top goalscorer: League: Martin Jakubko (8); All: Martin Jakubko (8)

The 2009 FC Moscow season was the club's 6th, and final season as a professional team. They finished the season in 6th place, reached the Semi-final of the 2008–09 Russian Cup and the Quarterfinal of the 2009–10 Russian Cup. Prior to the start of the 2010 Russian Premier League season, on 5 February 2010, FC Moscow announced that would not participate in the Russian Premier League with the club being officially excluded from the season on 17 February 2010.

== Squad ==
As of match played 29 November 2009

No.	Name	Nationality	Position	Date of birth (age)	Signed from	Signed in	Contract ends	Apps.	Goals
Goalkeepers
1	Illya Hawrylaw	(Belarus)	GK	26 September 1988 (aged 21)	Dinamo Minsk	2007		0	0
12	Valeriy Polyakov	(Russia)	GK	13 July 1989 (aged 20)	Rostov	2008		0	0
16	Anton Amelchenko	(Belarus)	GK	27 March 1985 (aged 24)	Gomel	2006		18	0
30	Yuri Zhevnov	(Belarus)	GK	17 April 1981 (aged 28)	BATE Borisov	2005		144	0
57	Nikita Alekseyev	(Russia)	GK	12 March 1990 (aged 19)	Youth Team	2008		0	0
58	Dmitriy Yershov	(Russia)	GK	12 June 1992 (aged 17)	Youth Team	2008		0	0
Defenders
2	Vladimir Khozin	(Russia)	DF	3 July 1989 (aged 20)	Rostov	2008		0	0
4	Jean	(Brazil)	DF	18 November 1979 (aged 30)	Corinthians	2009		0	0
5	Gia Grigalava	(Russia)	DF	5 August 1989 (aged 20)	loan from SKA Rostov	2009		18	0
6	Branko Ilić	(Slovenia)	DF	6 February 1983 (aged 26)	loan from Real Betis	2009		6	0
14	Kirill Nababkin	(Russia)	DF	8 September 1986 (aged 23)	Youth Team	2004		81	0
15	Alexandru Epureanu	(Moldova)	DF	27 September 1986 (aged 23)	Sheriff Tiraspol	2007		86	4
23	Isaac Okoronkwo	(Nigeria)	DF	1 May 1978 (aged 31)	Alania Vladikavkaz	2006		69	0
31	Andrei Vasyanovich	(Russia)	DF	13 June 1988 (aged 21)	Krasnodar-2000	2008		5	0
32	Nikita Korolyov	(Russia)	DF	15 March 1988 (aged 21)	Youth Team	2007		0	0
33	Dacosta Goore	(Ivory Coast)	DF	31 December 1984 (aged 24)	Luch-Energiya Vladivostok	2008		25	0
40	Sergei Shubin	(Russia)	DF	16 February 1988 (aged 21)	Youth Team	2008		0	0
43	Vitali Ustinov	(Russia)	DF	3 May 1991 (aged 18)	Youth Team	2009		0	0
46	Aleksei Kontsedalov	(Russia)	DF	24 July 1990 (aged 19)	Rostov	2008		0	0
49	Sergei Harlamov	(Russia)	DF	24 January 1991 (aged 18)	Spartak Moscow	2008		0	0
52	Pavel Golanov	(Russia)	DF	13 June 1989 (aged 20)	FC Moscow	2008		0	0
59	Andrei Prigarin	(Russia)	DF	9 February 1991 (aged 18)	Youth Team	2009		0	0
Midfielders
3	Aleksandr Sheshukov	(Russia)	MF	15 April 1983 (aged 26)	Luch-Energiya Vladivostok	2008		43	1
8	Dmitri Tarasov	(Russia)	MF	18 March 1987 (aged 22)	Tom Tomsk	2009		29	3
10	Zvonimir Vukić	(Serbia)	MF	19 July 1979 (aged 30)	Shakhtar Donetsk	2008		30	5
11	Aleksandr Stavpets	(Russia)	MF	4 July 1989 (aged 20)	Rostov	2008		41	2
13	Aleksei Rebko	(Russia)	MF	23 April 1986 (aged 23)	Rubin Kazan	2008		51	7
17	Pavel Golyshev	(Russia)	MF	7 July 1987 (aged 22)	Youth Team	2005		35	4
19	Aleksandr Samedov	(Russia)	MF	19 July 1984 (aged 25)	Lokomotiv Moscow	2008		53	9
21	Artur Rylov	(Russia)	MF	12 April 1989 (aged 20)	Youth Team	2008		4	0
28	Branislav Krunić	(Bosnia and Herzegovina)	MF	28 January 1979 (aged 30)	Tom Tomsk	2007	2009	63	5
34	Dmitri Agaptsev	(Russia)	MF	29 November 1991 (aged 18)	Youth Team	2009		0	0
39	Alexandr Yeliseyev	(Russia)	MF	15 November 1991 (aged 18)	Youth Team	2009		0	0
41	Kirill Lapidus	(Russia)	MF	2 December 1991 (aged 17)	Youth Team	2009		0	0
42	Denis Poyarkov	(Russia)	MF	16 October 1989 (aged 20)	Youth Team	2008		0	0
47	Konstantin Belov	(Russia)	MF	4 January 1990 (aged 19)	Amkar Perm	2009		0	0
51	Vyacheslav Dmitriyev	(Russia)	MF	28 May 1990 (aged 19)	Torpedo Moscow	2009		0	0
53	Aleksey Rogov	(Russia)	MF	8 May 1991 (aged 18)	Youth Team	2009		0	0
54	Marat Sadikov	(Russia)	MF	3 May 1991 (aged 18)	Youth Team	2009		0	0
55	Dmitriy Kutepov	(Russia)	MF	6 June 1988 (aged 21)	Youth Team	2008		0	0
56	Yevgeniy Rudyakov	(Russia)	MF	29 June 1992 (aged 17)	Youth Team	2009		0	0
60	Magomed Kurbanov	(Russia)	MF	16 August 1989 (aged 20)	Sheksna	2009		0	0
66	Aleksandr Kolomeytsev	(Russia)	MF	16 August 1989 (aged 20)	Sportakademklub	2009		0	0
77	Yuri Petrakov	(Russia)	MF	27 January 1991 (aged 18)	CSKA Moscow	2009		0	0
88	Edgaras Česnauskis	(Lithuania)	MF	5 February 1984 (aged 25)	Saturn Ramenskoye	2008		44	9
Forwards
7	Aleksandr Marenich	(Russia)	FW	29 April 1989 (aged 20)	Rostov	2007		7	1
20	Martin Jakubko	(Slovakia)	FW	26 February 1980 (aged 29)	Saturn Ramenskoye	2009		24	8
29	Igor Strelkov	(Russia)	FW	21 March 1982 (aged 27)	Tom Tomsk	2008	2011	39	3
35	Sergei Sipatov	(Russia)	FW	8 February 1993 (aged 16)	Konoplyov Academy	2009		0	0
48	Sergey Maslov	(Russia)	FW	3 September 1990 (aged 19)	Youth Team	2008		0	0
93	Aleksei Kukhtinov	(Russia)	FW	17 April 1993 (aged 16)	Youth Team	2009		0	0
Away on loan
18	Maxi López	(Argentina)	FW	3 April 1984 (aged 25)	Barcelona	2007		25	9
27	Vitali Kaleshin	(Russia)	DF	3 October 1980 (aged 29)	Kuban Krasnodar	2008		22	2
36	Sergei Shudrov	(Russia)	MF	11 August 1989 (aged 20)	Rostov	2008		0	0
44	Oleg Aleynik	(Russia)	MF	8 February 1989 (aged 20)	Rostov	2008		0	0
45	Pavel Yesikov	(Russia)	FW	29 January 1988 (aged 21)	Youth Team	2006		0	0
47	Artyom Varakin	(Russia)	MF	21 April 1987 (aged 22)	Youth Team	2006		4	0
50	Andrei Lukanchenkov	(Russia)	DF	7 February 1986 (aged 23)	Torpedo-Metallurg	2004		4	0
	Roman Hubník	(Czech Republic)	DF	6 June 1984 (aged 25)	Sigma Olomouc	2007		12	1
Players that left Moscow during the season
9	Pablo Barrientos	(Argentina)	MF	17 January 1985 (aged 23)	San Lorenzo	2006		42	10
25	Mariusz Jop	(Poland)	DF	3 August 1978 (aged 31)	Wisła Kraków	2004		100	4
37	Igor Kuzmin	(Russia)	FW	13 January 1989 (aged 20)	Saturn Ramenskoye	2009		0	0
38	Andrei Andriyevskiy	(Russia)	FW	11 January 1991 (aged 18)	Amkar Perm	2009		0	0
69	Héctor Bracamonte	(Argentina)	FW	16 February 1978 (aged 31)	Boca Juniors	2004		157	36

=== On loan ===
Note: Flags indicate national team as defined under FIFA eligibility rules; some limited exceptions apply. Players may hold more than one non-FIFA nationality.

No.	Pos.	Nation	Player
18	FW	ARG	Maxi López (at Grêmio)
27	DF	RUS	Vitali Kaleshin (at Rubin Kazan)
36	MF	RUS	Sergei Shudrov (at SKA-Energia Khabarovsk)
44	MF	RUS	Oleg Aleynik (at Metallurg Lipetsk)

No.	Pos.	Nation	Player
45	FW	RUS	Pavel Yesikov (at Volgar-Gazprom-2)
49	MF	RUS	Artyom Varakin (at Volgar-Gazprom-2)
50	DF	RUS	Andrei Lukanchenkov (at Nosta Novotroitsk)
—	DF	CZE	Roman Hubník (at Sparta Prague)

=== Left club during season ===
Note: Flags indicate national team as defined under FIFA eligibility rules; some limited exceptions apply. Players may hold more than one non-FIFA nationality.

No.	Pos.	Nation	Player
9	MF	ARG	Pablo Barrientos (to Catania)
25	DF	POL	Mariusz Jop (to Wisła Kraków)
37	FW	RUS	Igor Kuzmin

No.	Pos.	Nation	Player
38	FW	RUS	Andrei Andriyevskiy
69	FW	ARG	Héctor Bracamonte (to Terek Grozny)

== Transfers ==
=== In ===
Date	Position	Nationality	Name	From	Fee	Ref.
Winter 2009	MF	(Russia)	Dmitri Tarasov	Tom Tomsk	Undisclosed	
Winter 2009	FW	(Slovakia)	Martin Jakubko	Saturn Ramenskoye	Undisclosed	
Summer 2009	MF	(Russia)	Yuri Petrakov	CSKA Moscow	Undisclosed	

=== Loans in ===
Date from	Position	Nationality	Name	To	Date to	Ref.
Winter 2009	DF	(Russia)	Gia Grigalava	SKA Rostov	End of Season	
6 September 2009	DF	(Slovakia)	Branko Ilić	Real Betis	End of Season	

=== Out ===
Date	Position	Nationality	Name	To	Fee	Ref.
Winter 2009	MF	(Argentina)	Maximiliano Moralez	Vélez Sarsfield	Undisclosed	
Summer 2009	DF	(Poland)	Mariusz Jop	Wisła Kraków	Undisclosed	
Summer 2009	MF	(Argentina)	Pablo Barrientos	Catania	Undisclosed	
1 August 2009	FW	(Argentina)	Héctor Bracamonte	Terek Grozny	Undisclosed	

=== Loans out ===
Date from	Position	Nationality	Name	To	Date to	Ref.
23 August 2008	MF	(Argentina)	Pablo Barrientos	San Lorenzo	Summer 2009	
Winter 2009	DF	(Czech Republic)	Roman Hubník	Sparta Prague	End of Season	
Winter 2009	DF	(Russia)	Andrei Lukanchenkov	Nosta Novotroitsk	End of Season	
Winter 2009	DF	(Russia)	Sergei Shudrov	SKA-Energia Khabarovsk	End of Season	
Winter 2009	MF	(Russia)	Oleg Aleynik	Metallurg Lipetsk	End of Season	
Winter 2009	MF	(Russia)	Artyom Varakin	Volgar-Gazprom-2	End of Season	
Winter 2009	FW	(Russia)	Pavel Yesikov	Volgar-Gazprom-2	End of Season	
13 February 2009	FW	(Argentina)	Maxi López	Grêmio	End of Season	

=== Released ===
Date	Position	Nationality	Name	Joined	Date
Summer 2009	FW	(Russia)	Andrei Andriyevskiy		
Summer 2009	FW	(Russia)	Igor Kuzmin		
31 December 2009	GK	(Belarus)	Anton Amelchenko	Rostov	
31 December 2009	GK	(Belarus)	Illya Hawrylaw	Volgar-Gazprom-2	
31 December 2009	GK	(Belarus)	Yuri Zhevnov	Zenit St.Petersburg	
31 December 2009	GK	(Russia)	Nikita Alekseyev		
31 December 2009	GK	(Russia)	Valeriy Polyakov		
31 December 2009	GK	(Russia)	Dmitriy Yershov		
31 December 2009	DF	(Brazil)	Jean	Flamengo	
31 December 2009	DF	(Czech Republic)	Roman Hubník	Hertha BSC	
31 December 2009	DF	(Ivory Coast)	Dacosta Goore	Alania Vladikavkaz	
31 December 2009	DF	(Moldova)	Alexandru Epureanu	Dynamo Moscow	
31 December 2009	DF	(Nigeria)	Isaac Okoronkwo	Rostov	
31 December 2009	DF	(Russia)	Pavel Golanov		
31 December 2009	DF	(Russia)	Sergei Harlamov		
31 December 2009	DF	(Russia)	Vitali Kaleshin	Rubin Kazan	
31 December 2009	DF	(Russia)	Vladimir Khozin	Krylia Sovetov	
31 December 2009	DF	(Russia)	Aleksei Kontsedalov	Krylia Sovetov	
31 December 2009	DF	(Russia)	Nikita Korolyov		
31 December 2009	DF	(Russia)	Andrei Lukanchenkov	Avangard Kursk	
31 December 2009	DF	(Russia)	Kirill Nababkin	CSKA Moscow	
31 December 2009	DF	(Russia)	Andrei Prigarin		
31 December 2009	DF	(Russia)	Sergei Shubin		
31 December 2009	DF	(Russia)	Vitali Ustinov	Rubin Kazan	
31 December 2009	DF	(Russia)	Andrei Vasyanovich	CSKA Moscow	
31 December 2009	MF	(Bosnia and Herzegovina)	Branislav Krunić	Leotar	
31 December 2009	MF	(Lithuania)	Edgaras Česnauskis	Dynamo Moscow	
31 December 2009	MF	(Russia)	Oleg Aleynik	Rotor Volgograd	
31 December 2009	MF	(Russia)	Dmitri Agaptsev	Moscow (amateur)	
31 December 2009	MF	(Russia)	Konstantin Belov	Zvezda Ryazan	
31 December 2009	MF	(Russia)	Vyacheslav Dmitriyev		
31 December 2009	MF	(Russia)	Pavel Golyshev	Spartak Moscow	
31 December 2009	MF	(Russia)	Aleksandr Kolomeytsev	Amkar Perm	
31 December 2009	MF	(Russia)	Magomed Kurbanov		
31 December 2009	MF	(Russia)	Dmitriy Kutepov		
31 December 2009	MF	(Russia)	Kirill Lapidus		
31 December 2009	MF	(Russia)	Yuri Petrakov	Dynamo Moscow	
31 December 2009	MF	(Russia)	Denis Poyarkov	Metallurg Lipetsk	
31 December 2009	MF	(Russia)	Aleksei Rebko	Dynamo Moscow	
31 December 2009	MF	(Russia)	Aleksey Rogov		
31 December 2009	MF	(Russia)	Yevgeniy Rudyakov		
31 December 2009	MF	(Russia)	Artur Rylov	Krylia Sovetov	
31 December 2009	MF	(Russia)	Marat Sadikov		
31 December 2009	MF	(Russia)	Aleksandr Samedov	Dynamo Moscow	
31 December 2009	MF	(Russia)	Aleksandr Sheshukov	Spartak Moscow	
31 December 2009	MF	(Russia)	Sergei Shudrov	Rotor Volgograd	
31 December 2009	MF	(Russia)	Aleksandr Stavpets	Krylia Sovetov	
31 December 2009	MF	(Russia)	Dmitri Tarasov	Lokomotiv Moscow	
31 December 2009	MF	(Russia)	Artyom Varakin	Istra	
31 December 2009	MF	(Russia)	Alexandr Yeliseyev		
31 December 2009	MF	(Serbia)	Zvonimir Vukić	Partizan	
31 December 2009	FW	(Argentina)	Maxi López	Catania	20 January 2020
31 December 2009	FW	(Russia)	Aleksei Kukhtinov		
31 December 2009	FW	(Russia)	Aleksandr Marenich	Alania Vladikavkaz	
31 December 2009	FW	(Russia)	Sergey Maslov	Khimki	
31 December 2009	FW	(Russia)	Sergei Sipatov	CSKA Moscow	
31 December 2009	FW	(Russia)	Igor Strelkov	Krylia Sovetov	
31 December 2009	FW	(Russia)	Pavel Yesikov	Volgar-Gazprom	
31 December 2009	FW	(Slovakia)	Martin Jakubko	Saturn Ramenskoye	

== Competitions ==
=== Premier League ===
==== Results by round ====
Round	1	2	3	4	5	6	7	8	9	10	11	12	13	14	15	16	17	18	19	20	21	22	23	24	25	26	27	28	29	30
Ground	A	H	A	H	A	H	A	H	A	H	A	H	A	H	A	A	H	A	H	A	H	A	H	A	H	A	H	A	H	H
Result	L	D	D	W	W	W	W	D	D	W	D	W	L	W	D	W	L	L	W	D	L	L	W	D	W	W	W	D	L	L

Updated to match(es) played on 29 November 2009. Source: See Results
A = Away; H = Home; W = Win; D = Draw; L = Loss

==== Results ====
14 March 2009 1	Dynamo Moscow	1 – 0	FC Moscow	Khimki
14:15 MSK (UTC+3)	D.Kombarov (yellow card) 24'; Fernández (yellow card) 42'; K.Kombarov (yellow card) 72'; Kerzhakov 90+' (yellow card) 90+'	Report	Nababkin (yellow card) 41'; Epureanu (yellow card) 53'; Česnauskis (yellow card) 64'; Rebko (yellow card) 71'	Stadium: Arena Khimki; Attendance: 8,000; Referee: Maksim Layushkin
Note: Match played at the Arena Khimki in Khimki instead of Dynamo Moscow's regular Dynamo Stadium in Moscow.

21 March 2009 2	FC Moscow	0 – 0	Terek Grozny	Moscow
17:30 MSK (UTC+3)	Nababkin (yellow card) 6'; Samedov (yellow card) 35'; Krunić (yellow card) 67'	Report	Smirnov (yellow card) 8'; Zabavník (yellow card) 10'; Amelyanchuk (yellow card) 64'; Gvazava (yellow card) 69'; Kobenko (yellow card) 71'; Cléber (yellow card) 90+'; Dykan (yellow card) 90+'	Stadium: Eduard Streltsov Stadium; Attendance: 3,600; Referee: Alexei Kovalev

4 April 2009 3	Rubin Kazan	0 – 0	FC Moscow	Kazan
16:30 MSK (UTC+3)	Ansaldi (yellow card) 36'	Report	Grigalava (yellow card) 23'; Vukić (yellow card) 27'; Nababkin (yellow card) 56'; Zhevnov (yellow card) 77'	Stadium: Central Stadium; Attendance: 11,500; Referee: Nikolai Ivanov

11 April 2009 4	FC Moscow	3 – 1	Spartak Moscow	Moscow
14:00 MSK (UTC+3)	Česnauskis 2'; Epureanu 17'; Vukić (yellow card) 27'; Okoronkwo (yellow card) 31'; Tarasov (yellow card) 36' (goal) 69'; Stavpets (yellow card) 90+'	Report	Alex (yellow card) 24' (goal) 87' (pen.); Fathi (yellow card) 45'; Parshivlyuk (yellow card) 69'	Stadium: Eduard Streltsov Stadium; Attendance: 9,600; Referee: Vladimir Pettay

18 April 2009 5	Saturn Ramenskoye	0 – 1	FC Moscow	Ramenskoye
15:00 MSK (UTC+3)	Zelão (yellow card) 37'	Report	Tarasov (yellow card) 37' (yellow-red card) 83'; Bracamonte 76'; Česnauskis (yellow card) 79'	Stadium: Saturn Stadium; Attendance: 3,500; Referee: Yuri Baskakov

26 April 2009 6	FC Moscow	2 – 1	Tom Tomsk	Moscow
14:00 MSK (UTC+3)	Okoronkwo (yellow card) 15'; Jakubko (yellow card) 43' (goal) 75'; Bracamonte 44'; Stavpets (yellow card) 51'; Grigalava (yellow card) 59'	Report	Kornilenko 36' (yellow card) 52'; Yanotovsky (yellow card) 59'	Stadium: Eduard Streltsov Stadium; Attendance: 3,000; Referee: Vladimir Kazmenko

2 May 2009 7	Amkar Perm	0 – 1	FC Moscow	Perm
16:30 MSK (UTC+3)	Novaković (yellow card) 28'; Starkov (yellow card) 84'	Report	Rebko (yellow card) 16' (yellow-red card) 88'; Sheshukov (yellow card) 19'; Jakubko 21'; Strelkov (yellow card) 90+'	Stadium: Zvezda Stadium; Attendance: 11,800; Referee: Vyacheslav Popov

10 May 2009 8	FC Moscow	0 – 0	Lokomotiv Moscow	Moscow
19:00 MSK (UTC+3)	Česnauskis (yellow card) 34'; Bracamonte (yellow card) 34'; Jop (yellow card) 77'; Nababkin (yellow card) 87'; Sheshukov (yellow card) 90+'	Report	Baša (yellow card) 45+' (yellow-red card) 57'; Rodolfo (yellow card) 55'; Ivanov (yellow card) 60'	Stadium: Eduard Streltsov Stadium; Attendance: 6,000; Referee: Maksim Layushkin

16 May 2009 9	Khimki	1 – 1	FC Moscow	Khimki
19:00 MSK (UTC+3)	Kirillov (yellow card) 9' (goal) 43'; Cvetković (yellow card) 68'; Nizamutdinov (penalty missed) 70'	Report	Jop (yellow card) 25' (red card) 69'; Vasyanovich (yellow card) 42'; Jakubko 58'	Stadium: Arena Khimki; Attendance: 3,500; Referee: Aleksandr Kolobaev

24 May 2009 10	FC Moscow	2 – 0	Rostov	Moscow
14:00 MSK (UTC+3)	Samedov 33'; Česnauskis (yellow card) 48'; Jakubko 82'	Report	Rozhkov (yellow card) 50' (yellow-red card) 85'	Stadium: Eduard Streltsov Stadium; Attendance: 2,500; Referee: Vladislav Bezborodov

30 May 2009 11	Krylia Sovetov	1 – 1	FC Moscow	Samara
16:30 MSK (UTC+3)	Koller 17'; Jarošík (yellow card) 87'; Taranov (yellow card) 87'	Report	Tarasov (yellow card) 8'; Samedov 11'; Rebko (yellow card) 25'; Krunić (yellow card) 65'; Okoronkwo (yellow card) 90+'	Stadium: Metallurg Stadium; Attendance: 14,300; Referee: Ildus Biglov

14 June 2009 12	FC Moscow	2 – 0	CSKA Moscow	Moscow
14:00 MSK (UTC+3)	Samedov 4'; Krunić 49'; Sheshukov (yellow card) 54'	Report	Aldonin (yellow card) 12'; Carvalho (yellow card) 43'; Shchennikov (yellow card) 45'; Necid (yellow card) 77'	Stadium: Eduard Streltsov Stadium; Attendance: 7,500; Referee: Almir Kayumov

12 July 2009 13	Zenit St.Petersburg	1 – 0	FC Moscow	Saint Petersburg
14:00 MSK (UTC+3)	Kim (yellow card) 49'; Križanac 56' (yellow card) 76'; Meira (yellow card) 57'	Report	Česnauskis (yellow card) 32'; Okoronkwo (yellow card) 75'; Tarasov (yellow card) 80'	Stadium: Petrovsky Stadium; Attendance: 20,000; Referee: Eduard Malyi

19 July 2009 14	FC Moscow	4 – 1	Kuban Krasnodar	Moscow
18:15 MSK (UTC+3)	Česnauskis 23' (pen.), 78' (yellow card) 88'; Sheshukov (yellow card) 43'; Grigalava (yellow card) 45+'; Samedov 53'; Krunić 71'	Report	Traoré 19'; Draman (yellow card) 73' (yellow-red card) 90+'	Stadium: Eduard Streltsov Stadium; Attendance: 2,500; Referee: Vladimir Pettay

26 July 2009 15	Spartak Nalchik	0 – 0	FC Moscow	Nalchik
19:00 MSK (UTC+3)	Geteriev (yellow card) 15'; Gogua (yellow card) 20'; Kisenkov (yellow card) 41'; Mashukov (yellow card) 65'	Report	Tarasov (yellow card) 9'; Samedov (yellow card) 20'	Stadium: Spartak Stadium; Attendance: 12,000; Referee: Vladislav Bezborodov

1 August 2009 16	Terek Grozny	1 – 2	FC Moscow	Grozny
20:30 MSK (UTC+3)	Zabavník (yellow card) 60'; Mărgăritescu (yellow card) 71'; Lakhiyalov 77'	Report	Sheshukov (yellow card) 10'; Rebko (yellow card) 45+'; Vukić 62'; Česnauskis 74'; Epureanu (yellow card) 90+'	Stadium: Sultan Bilimkhanov Stadium; Attendance: 9,000; Referee: Stanislav Sukhina

8 August 2009 17	Moscow	1 – 3	Rubin Kazan	Moscow
18:45 MSK (UTC+3)	Grigalava (yellow card) 8'; Marenich 53'; Tarasov (yellow card) 60'; Česnauskis (yellow card) 67'	Report	Karadeniz 25' (yellow card) 30'; Bukharov 49'; Balyaikin (yellow card) 63'; Domínguez 84' (pen.)	Stadium: Eduard Streltsov Stadium; Attendance: 5,000; Referee: Aleksandr Gvardis

16 August 2009 18	Spartak Moscow	2 – 1	FC Moscow	Moscow
21:00 MSK (UTC+3)	Welliton (yellow card) 31'; Bystrov (yellow card) 31'; Yakovlev 45+'; Makeyev 88'	Report	Sheshukov (yellow card) 31'; Tarasov (yellow card) 31'; Samedov (yellow card) 31'; Vukić 50'	Stadium: Luzhniki Stadium; Attendance: 17,000; Referee: Aleksei Nikolaev

22 August 2009 19	FC Moscow	3 – 1	Saturn Ramenskoye	Moscow
16:00 MSK (UTC+3)	Jakubko 2'; Epureanu (yellow card) 28'; Strelkov 77'; Nababkin (yellow card) 83'; Sheshukov (yellow card) 85'; Vasyanovich (yellow card) 90+'; Samedov 90+'	Report	Levchenko (yellow card) 29'; Nakhushev (yellow card) 54'; Angbwa 87'	Stadium: Eduard Streltsov Stadium; Attendance: 3,700; Referee: Aleksandr Kolobaev

29 August 2009 20	Tom Tomsk	0 – 0	FC Moscow	Tomsk
14:00 MSK (UTC+3)	D.N.Smirnov (yellow card) 78'	Report	Nababkin (yellow card) 20'; Tarasov (yellow card) 48'; Strelkov (yellow card) 86'	Stadium: Trud Stadium; Attendance: 12,000; Referee: Alexei Kovalev

12 September 2009 21	FC Moscow	0 – 2	Amkar Perm	Moscow
14:00 MSK (UTC+3)	Epureanu (yellow card) 29' (yellow-red card) 64'; Česnauskis (penalty missed) 48'; Rebko (yellow card) 74'	Report	Belorukov 8'; Drinčić (yellow card) 45'; Sirakov (yellow card) 48'; Grishin (yellow card) 60' (yellow-red card) 62'; Peev (yellow card) 63'; Afanasyev 90'	Stadium: Eduard Streltsov Stadium; Attendance: 8,000; Referee: Vladimir Kazmenko

19 September 2009 22	Lokomotiv Moscow	1 – 0	FC Moscow	Moscow
18:30 MSK (UTC+3)	Dujmović (yellow card) 23'; Glushakov (yellow card) 32'; Sychev 45' (pen.) (yellow card) 45'; Cociș (yellow card) 50'	Report	Jakubko (yellow card) 1'; Tarasov (yellow card) 15'; Nababkin (yellow card) 44'	Stadium: RZD Arena; Attendance: 13,500; Referee: Stanislav Sukhina

26 September 2009 23	FC Moscow	3 – 0	Khimki	Moscow
18:30 MSK (UTC+3)	Jakubko 43'; Golyshev 61'; Vukić 80' (pen.)	Report	Gapon (yellow card) 17'; Rotenberg (yellow card) 21'; Kirillov (yellow card) 38'; Ibragimov (yellow card) 57'; Akhmedov (yellow card) 79'; Starkov (yellow card) 84'	Stadium: Eduard Streltsov Stadium; Attendance: 3,700; Referee: Sergei Karasev

3 October 2009 24	Rostov	2 – 2	FC Moscow	Rostov-on-Don
18:30 MSK (UTC+3)	Anđelković (yellow card) 31'; Akimov 41'; Petrović (yellow card) 45'; Sheriyev (yellow card) 55'; Lebedenko 58'; Mandrykin (yellow card) 64'	Report	Jakubko (yellow card) 26' (goal) 89'; Česnauskis (yellow card) 64'; Rebko 71'	Stadium: Olimp-2; Attendance: 7,125; Referee: Alexei Kovalev

18 October 2009 25	FC Moscow	2 – 1	Krylia Sovetov	Moscow
16:15 MSK (UTC+3)	Vukić (yellow card) 10' (penalty missed) 11'; Sheshukov (yellow card) 20'; Nababkin (yellow card) 26' (yellow-red card) 56'; Golyshev 41'; Rebko (yellow card) 47' (goal) 77' (pen.); Jakubko (yellow card) 79'	Report	Belozyorov (yellow card) 9'; Koller (yellow card) 35' (goal) 52'; Shishkin (yellow card) 39'; Ivanov (yellow card) 43'; Ajinjal (penalty missed) 57'; Jarošík (yellow card) 90'	Stadium: Eduard Streltsov Stadium; Attendance: 2,500; Referee: Igor Egorov

25 October 2009 26	CSKA Moscow	1 – 3	FC Moscow	Moscow
14:00 MSK (UTC+3)	Akinfeev (yellow card) 20'; Odiah (yellow card) 29'; Grigoryev (yellow card) 37'; Necid 83'	Report	Tarasov 10' (yellow card) 25'; Rebko 20' (pen.); Epureanu 39' (yellow card) 62'	Stadium: Luzhniki Stadium; Attendance: 5,600; Referee: Almir Kayumov

31 October 2009 27	FC Moscow	1 – 0	Zenit St.Petersburg	Moscow
14:00 MSK (UTC+3)	Goore (yellow card) 20'; Sheshukov 85'	Report	Denisov (yellow card) 34'; Semshov (yellow card) 88'	Stadium: Eduard Streltsov Stadium; Attendance: 9,000; Referee: Aleksandr Gvardis

7 November 2009 28	Kuban Krasnodar	3 – 3	FC Moscow	Krasnodar
18:30 MSK (UTC+3)	Dzhioyev 69' (yellow card) 70'; Traoré 73'; Skvernyuk (yellow card) 74'; Draman 82'; Khagush (yellow card) 90'	Report	Rebko 29', 87'; Jakubko 35'	Stadium: Kuban Stadium; Referee: Vladimir Pettay

21 November 2009 29	FC Moscow	0 – 2	Spartak Nalchik	Moscow
14:00 MSK (UTC+3)	Tarasov (yellow card) 42'	Report	Kisenkov (yellow card) 14'; Siradze 25'; Asildarov 52'; Geteriev (yellow card) 77'	Stadium: Eduard Streltsov Stadium; Attendance: 2,500; Referee: Stanislav Sukhina

29 November 2009 30	FC Moscow	1 – 2	Dynamo Moscow	Moscow
14:00 MSK (UTC+3)	Vukić (red card) 22'; Kolodin 42' (o.g.); Goore (yellow card) 45'; Strelkov (yellow card) 78'; Tarasov (yellow card) 87'	Report	Kolodin 7' (yellow card) 67'; Wilkshire (yellow card) 22'; Fernández 35'; Aguiar (yellow card) 43'	Stadium: Eduard Streltsov Stadium; Attendance: 4,500; Referee: Vladimir Pettay

==== League table ====
Pos	Team	Pld	W	D	L	GF	GA	GD	Pts	Qualification or relegation
4	Lokomotiv Moscow	30	15	9	6	43	30	+13	54	Qualification to Europa League play-off round
5	CSKA Moscow	30	16	4	10	48	30	+18	52	Qualification to Europa League play-off round
6	FC Moscow (R)	30	13	9	8	39	28	+11	48	Club expelled after season (Note: FC Moscow announced on 5 February 2010 that they will not participate in next season's Russian Premier League. On 17 February, they were officially excluded from the 2010 Russian Premier League.)
7	Saturn	30	13	6	11	38	41	−3	45	
8	Dynamo Moscow	30	12	6	12	31	37	−6	42	

Source: RFPL (in Russian)
Rules for classification: 1st points; 2nd matches won; 3rd head-to-head (points, matches won, goal difference, goals scored, away goals scored); 4th goal difference; 5th goals scored; 6th away goals scored; 7th position in previous season or decision game
(R) Relegated

=== Russian Cup ===
==== 2008-09 ====
22 April 2009 Quarterfinal	FC Moscow	2 – 1	Tom Tomsk	Moscow
20:00 MSK (UTC+3)	Okoronkwo (yellow card) 12'; Epureanu 63'; Bracamonte 75'	Report	Jokić (yellow card) 15'; D.N.Smirnov (yellow card) 54'; Michkov 58'; Kornilenko (yellow card) 81'; Skoblyakov (yellow card) 90'	Stadium: Eduard Streltsov Stadium; Attendance: 2,000; Referee: Igor Egorov

6 May 2009 Semifinal	FC Moscow	0 – 1	Rubin Kazan	Moscow
18:30 MSK (UTC+3)	Bracamonte (yellow card) 12'; Epureanu (yellow card) 18'; Strelkov (yellow card) 80'	Report	Domínguez (yellow card) 17'; Rebrov (yellow card) 20'; Ryazantsev 49' (yellow card) 63'; Popov (yellow card) 81'	Stadium: Eduard Streltsov Stadium; Attendance: 5,000; Referee: Nikolai Ivanov

==== 2009-10 ====
15 July 2009 Round of 32	Salyut-Energiya Belgorod	0 – 2	FC Moscow	Belgorod
20:00 MSK (UTC+3)	Surnev (yellow card) 86'; Otyutsky (yellow card) 90+'	Report	Tarasov (yellow card) 52' (goal) 86'; Nababkin (yellow card) 73'; Česnauskis 90+5' (yellow card) 90+'	Stadium: Salyut Stadium; Attendance: 12,000; Referee: Vyacheslav Popov

5 August 2009 Round of 16	Spartak Moscow	1 – 2	FC Moscow	Moscow
19:00 MSK (UTC+3)	Makeyev 9'; Covalciuc (red card) 42'; Alex (yellow card) 84'	Report	Tarasov (yellow card) 14'; Česnauskis (yellow card) 22' (goal) 27'; Strelkov 75'	Stadium: Luzhniki Stadium; Attendance: 14,000; Referee: Maksim Layushkin

== Squad statistics ==
As of match played 29 November 2009

=== Appearances and goals ===
No.	Pos	Nat	Player	Total		Premier League		2008-09 Russian Cup		2009-10 Russian Cup	
No.	Pos	Nat	Player	Apps	Goals	Apps	Goals	Apps	Goals	Apps	Goals
3	MF	(Russia) RUS	Aleksandr Sheshukov	29	1	23+2	1	1+1	0	2	0
5	DF	(Russia) RUS	Gia Grigalava	18	0	13+1	0	2	0	2	0
6	DF	(Slovenia) SVN	Branko Ilić	6	0	4+2	0	0	0	0	0
7	FW	(Russia) RUS	Aleksandr Marenich	12	1	3+6	1	0+1	0	1+1	0
8	MF	(Russia) RUS	Dmitri Tarasov	29	3	22+3	2	2	0	2	1
10	MF	(Serbia) SRB	Zvonimir Vukić	27	3	12+12	3	1	0	2	0
11	MF	(Russia) RUS	Aleksandr Stavpets	22	0	8+11	0	1	0	1+1	0
13	MF	(Russia) RUS	Aleksei Rebko	31	5	24+3	5	2	0	2	0
14	DF	(Russia) RUS	Kirill Nababkin	32	0	28	0	2	0	2	0
15	DF	(Moldova) MDA	Alexandru Epureanu	29	3	25	2	2	1	2	0
16	GK	(Belarus) BLR	Anton Amelchenko	1	0	1	0	0	0	0	0
17	MF	(Russia) RUS	Pavel Golyshev	12	2	4+6	2	0	0	1+1	0
19	MF	(Russia) RUS	Aleksandr Samedov	30	5	27	5	1	0	1+1	0
20	FW	(Slovakia) SVK	Martin Jakubko	24	8	18+5	8	0+1	0	0	0
21	MF	(Russia) RUS	Artur Rylov	2	0	0+2	0	0	0	0	0
23	DF	(Nigeria) NGA	Isaac Okoronkwo	21	0	20	0	1	0	0	0
28	MF	(Bosnia and Herzegovina) BIH	Branislav Krunić	19	2	9+7	2	1+1	0	0+1	0
29	FW	(Russia) RUS	Igor Strelkov	24	2	3+18	1	0+2	0	1	1
30	GK	(Belarus) BLR	Yuri Zhevnov	33	0	29	0	2	0	2	0
31	DF	(Russia) RUS	Andrei Vasyanovich	5	0	2+3	0	0	0	0	0
33	DF	(Ivory Coast) CIV	Dacosta Goore	17	0	17	0	0	0	0	0
88	MF	(Lithuania) LTU	Edgaras Česnauskis	29	6	24+1	4	2	0	1+1	2
Players away from the club on loan:
Players who appeared for Moscow but left during the season:
25	DF	(Poland) POL	Mariusz Jop	3	0	1+2	0	0	0	0	0
69	FW	(Argentina) ARG	Héctor Bracamonte	15	3	13	2	2	1	0	0

=== Goal scorers ===
Place	Position	Nation	Number	Name	Premier League	2008-09 Russian Cup	2009-10 Russian Cup	Total
1	FW	(Slovakia)	20	Martin Jakubko	8	0	0	8
2	MF	(Lithuania)	88	Edgaras Česnauskis	4	0	2	6
3	MF	(Russia)	19	Aleksandr Samedov	5	0	0	5
3	MF	(Russia)	13	Aleksei Rebko	5	0	0	5
5	MF	(Serbia)	10	Zvonimir Vukić	3	0	0	3
5	DF	(Moldova)	15	Alexandru Epureanu	2	1	0	3
5	FW	(Argentina)	69	Héctor Bracamonte	2	1	0	3
5	MF	(Russia)	8	Dmitri Tarasov	2	0	1	3
9	MF	(Bosnia and Herzegovina)	28	Branislav Krunić	2	0	0	2
9	MF	(Russia)	17	Pavel Golyshev	2	0	0	2
9	FW	(Russia)	29	Igor Strelkov	1	0	1	2
12	FW	(Russia)	7	Aleksandr Marenich	1	0	0	1
12	MF	(Russia)	3	Aleksandr Sheshukov	1	0	0	1
12				Own goal	1	0	0	1
Total					39	2	4	45

=== Clean sheets ===
Place	Position	Nation	Number	Name	Premier League	2008-09 Russian Cup	2009-10 Russian Cup	Total
1	GK	(Belarus)	30	Yuri Zhevnov	11	0	1	12
TOTALS					11	0	1	12

=== Disciplinary record ===
Number	Nation	Position	Name	Premier League		2008-09 Russian Cup		2009-10 Russian Cup		Total	
Number	Nation	Position	Name	Booked	Sent off (straight red)	Booked	Sent off (straight red)	Booked	Sent off (straight red)	Booked	Sent off (straight red)
3	(Russia)	MF	Aleksandr Sheshukov	8	0	0	0	0	0	8	0
5	(Russia)	DF	Gia Grigalava	4	0	0	0	0	0	4	0
8	(Russia)	MF	Dmitri Tarasov	13	1	0	0	2	0	15	1
10	(Serbia)	MF	Zvonimir Vukić	3	1	0	0	0	0	3	1
11	(Russia)	MF	Aleksandr Stavpets	2	0	0	0	0	0	2	0
13	(Russia)	MF	Aleksei Rebko	7	1	0	0	0	0	7	1
14	(Russia)	DF	Kirill Nababkin	9	1	0	0	1	0	10	1
15	(Moldova)	DF	Alexandru Epureanu	6	1	1	0	0	0	7	1
19	(Russia)	MF	Aleksandr Samedov	3	0	0	0	0	0	3	0
20	(Slovakia)	FW	Martin Jakubko	4	0	0	0	0	0	4	0
23	(Nigeria)	DF	Isaac Okoronkwo	4	0	1	0	0	0	5	0
28	(Bosnia and Herzegovina)	MF	Branislav Krunić	2	0	0	0	0	0	2	0
29	(Russia)	FW	Igor Strelkov	3	0	1	0	0	0	4	0
30	(Belarus)	GK	Yuri Zhevnov	1	0	0	0	0	0	1	0
31	(Russia)	DF	Andrei Vasyanovich	2	0	0	0	0	0	2	0
33	(Ivory Coast)	DF	Dacosta Goore	2	0	0	0	0	0	2	0
88	(Lithuania)	MF	Edgaras Česnauskis	8	0	0	0	2	0	10	0
Players away on loan:
Players who left Moscow during the season:
25	(Poland)	DF	Mariusz Jop	2	1	0	0	0	0	2	1
69	(Argentina)	FW	Héctor Bracamonte	1	0	1	0	0	0	2	0
Total				84	6	4	0	5	0	93	6
