= Kirsanov (surname) =

Kirsanov (Russian: Кирсанов) is a Russian surname. The feminine variant is Kirsanova (Russian: Кирсанова). Notable people with the surname include:

== Masculine form ==
- Alexandr Kirsanov (1978–2025), Azerbaijani-American ice dancer
- Kirill Kirsanov (born 2002), Russian ice hockey player
- Maksim Kirsanov (born 1987), Russian football player
- Nikita Kirsanov (born 1995), Russian football player
- Semyon Kirsanov (1906–1972), Soviet and Russian poet and journalist
- Sergei Kirsanov (born 1961), Russian football player and manager
- Sergey Kirsanov (born 1963), Soviet and Ukrainian sprint canoeist
- Vladimir Kirsanov (rower) (1929–1995), Soviet rower
- Vladimir Kirsanov (dancer) (1947–2021), Russian choreographer and dancer

== Feminine form ==
- Nina Kirsanova (1898–1989), Russian-born Yugoslavian ballet dancer
- Viktoria Kirsanova (born 1998), Russian cross-country mountain biker

== See also ==
- Dimitri Kirsanoff (1899–1957), Russian-French experimental filmmaker
