= Yevgeni Smirnov =

Yevgeni Smirnov may refer to:

- Yevgeni Smirnov (footballer, born 1986), Russian footballer with FC Tekstilshchik Ivanovo
- Yevgeni Smirnov (basketball), basketball player
- Yevgeni Smirnov (cinematographer), Russian cinematographer
- Yevgeni Smirnov (footballer, born 1994), Russian footballer
- Yevgeny Smirnov (politician), Russian politician
