= Vladimir Kirsanov =

Vladimir Kirsanov may refer to:

- Vladimir Kirsanov (rower)
- Vladimir Kirsanov (dancer)
