= Petrakov =

Petrakov (Russian: Петраков) is a Slavic masculine surname; its feminine counterpart is Petrakova. Notable people with the name include:

- Anna Petrakova (born 1984), Russian basketball player
- Oleksandr Petrakov (born 1957), Ukrainian football defender
- Valery Petrakov (born 1958), Russian football striker
- Vitaly Petrakov (born 1954), Russian cyclist
- Yuri Petrakov (born 1991), Russian football midfielder
