= Semeykin =

Semeykin may refer to:

- Semeykin (crater), impact crater on Mars
- Artyom Semeykin (born 1996), Russian football defender
