= Sergey Vasilyev =

Sergey Vasilyev may refer to:

- Sergei Vasilyev (director) (1900–1959), Soviet film director, editor, and screenwriter
- Sergey Vasilyev (actor) (1827–1862), Russian stage actor
- Sergei Vasilyev (footballer) (born 1982), Russian footballer
