= Dmitri Samoylov (footballer, born 1993) =

Russian footballer

Personal information
- Full name: Dmitri Alekseyevich Samoylov
- Date of birth: 25 September 1993 (age 33)
- Place of birth: Belgorod, Russia
- Height: 1.79 m (5 ft 10 1/2 in)
- Position: Midfielder

Team information
- Current team: FC Shinnik Yaroslavl
- Number: 15

Senior career*
Years	Team	Apps	(Gls)
2015–2017	FC Energomash Belgorod	49	(10)
2017–	FC Shinnik Yaroslavl	258	(38)
- * Club domestic league appearances and goals as of 16 May 2026

Dmitri Alekseyevich Samoylov (Russian: Дмитрий Алексеевич Самойлов; born 25 September 1993) is a Russian football player who plays for FC Shinnik Yaroslavl.

== Club career ==
He made his debut in the Russian Professional Football League for FC Energomash Belgorod on 20 July 2015 in a game against FC Torpedo Moscow.

He made his Russian Football National League debut for FC Shinnik Yaroslavl on 8 July 2017 in a game against FC Zenit-2 Saint Petersburg.

== Honours ==
- Russian Second League
  - Group 2 winners: 2021–22
  - Zone "Center" runners-up: 2015–16
