= Sergei Tonkikh =

Russian footballer

Personal information
- Full name: Sergei Aleksandrovich Tonkikh
- Date of birth: 16 May 1986 (age 40)
- Place of birth: Manturovo, Kursk Oblast, Russian SFSR
- Height: 1.74 m (5 ft 9 in)
- Positions: Midfielder; defender

Senior career*
Years	Team	Apps	(Gls)
2004	FC Avangard Kursk	2	(0)
2005	FC Avangard-2 Kursk		
2006–2007	FC Avangard Kursk	54	(2)
2008–2010	FC Salyut Belgorod	43	(1)
2011	FC Metallurg-Oskol Stary Oskol	19	(1)
2012	FC Sever Murmansk	17	(3)
2013–2015	FC Dynamo Bryansk	49	(2)
2015–2018	FC Energomash Belgorod	69	(4)
2018–2019	FC Salyut Belgorod	19	(1)
2019	FC Ryazan	12	(1)
- * Club domestic league appearances and goals

Sergei Aleksandrovich Tonkikh (Russian: Серге́й Александрович Тонких; born 16 May 1986) is a Russian former professional football player.

== Club career ==
He made his Russian Football National League debut for FC Avangard Kursk on 18 April 2006 in a game against FC Mashuk-KMV Pyatigorsk.
