= Filipp Dvoretskov =

Russian football player (born 1997)

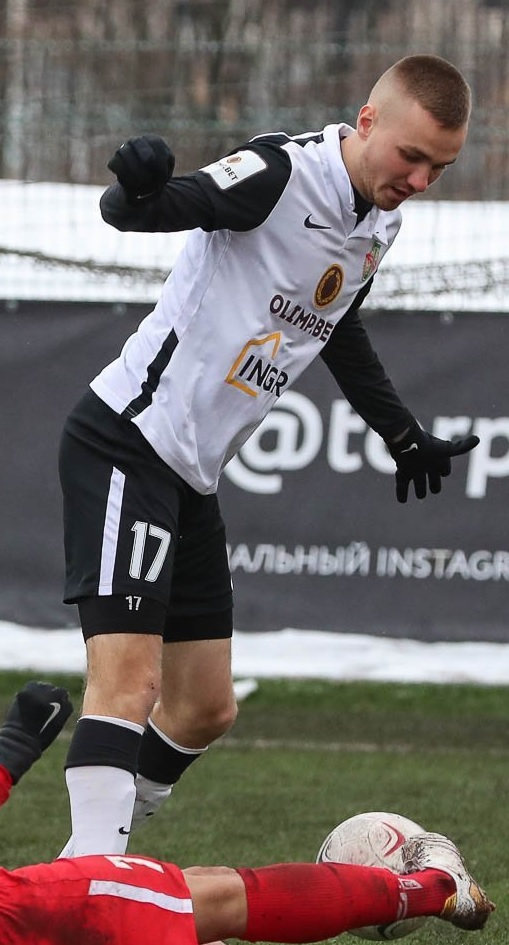
- Dvoretskov with Torpedo Moscow in 2021

Personal information
- Full name: Filipp Vladislavovich Dvoretskov
- Date of birth: 17 March 1997 (age 29)
- Place of birth: Moscow, Russia
- Height: 1.83 m (6 ft 0 in)
- Position: Midfielder

Team information
- Current team: Murom
- Number: 22

Youth career
- 2004–2010: Moscow
- 2010: CSKA Moscow
- 2010–2014: Lokomotiv Moscow
- 2015: Torpedo Moscow

Senior career*
Years	Team	Apps	(Gls)
2015–2017	Torpedo Moscow	62	(8)
2018	Nosta Novotroitsk	7	(1)
2018–2019	Mordovia Saransk	53	(5)
2020–2021	Torpedo Moscow	33	(4)
2021–2023	Neftekhimik Nizhnekamsk	43	(4)
2023–2024	Rotor Volgograd	19	(2)
2025–2026	Znamya Truda Orekhovo-Zuyevo	27	(1)
2026–	Murom	25	(0)

International career^{‡}
2012	Russia U-15	2	(0)
2016	Russia U-21	2	(0)
- * Club domestic league appearances and goals as of 1 November 2026 ‡ National team caps and goals as of 14 November 2016

Filipp Vladislavovich Dvoretskov (Russian: Филипп Владиславович Дворецков; born 17 March 1997) is a Russian football player who plays for Murom.

== Club career ==
He made his debut in the Russian Professional Football League for Torpedo Moscow on 20 July 2015 in a game against Energomash Belgorod. He made his Russian Football National League debut for Mordovia Saransk on 29 July 2018 in a game against Krasnodar-2.
