= Oleg Kalugin (footballer) =

Russian footballer

Personal information
- Full name: Oleg Vladimirovich Kalugin
- Date of birth: 23 December 1989 (age 36)
- Place of birth: Shebekino, Russian SFSR
- Height: 1.80 m (5 ft 11 in)
- Position: Midfielder

Youth career
- 1997–2008: DYuSSh-3 Shebekino

Senior career*
Years	Team	Apps	(Gls)
2009–2012	FC Nezhegol Shebekino (amateur)		
2013	Avangard Kursk	5	(0)
2014–2015	Energomash Belgorod (amateur)		
2015–2018	Energomash Belgorod	75	(12)
2018	Ryazan	4	(1)
2018–2019	Torpedo Moscow	35	(0)
2020	Avangard Kursk	2	(0)
2020–2022	KAMAZ Naberezhnye Chelny	50	(4)
2022–2023	Tekstilshchik Ivanovo	30	(0)
2023	Spartak Tambov	5	(0)
2023–2025	Tekstilshchik Ivanovo	47	(0)
2026	Salyut Belgorod	4	(0)
- * Club domestic league appearances and goals as of 18 April 2026

Oleg Vladimirovich Kalugin (Russian: Олег Владимирович Калугин; born 23 December 1989) is a Russian football midfielder.

== Club career ==
He made his debut in the Russian Second Division for Avangard Kursk on 16 April 2013 in a game against Sokol Saratov.

He made his Russian Football National League debut for Torpedo Moscow on 13 July 2019 in a game against Baltika Kaliningrad.
