= Viktor Sergeyev =

Russian footballer

Personal information
- Full name: Viktor Olegovich Sergeyev
- Date of birth: 18 April 1993 (age 33)
- Place of birth: Stary Oskol, Russia
- Height: 1.76 m (5 ft 9 in)
- Position: Forward

Senior career*
Years	Team	Apps	(Gls)
2013–2015	FC Sibir-2 Novosibirsk	55	(13)
2015–2018	FC Energomash Belgorod	61	(19)
2018	→ FC Olimpiyets Nizhny Novgorod (loan)	8	(2)
2018–2019	FC Nizhny Novgorod	25	(0)
2019	FC Mordovia Saransk	16	(3)
2020	FC Armavir	1	(0)
2020–2021	FC Volgar Astrakhan	17	(1)
2021–2022	FC Tekstilshchik Ivanovo	32	(2)
2022	FC Chelyabinsk	12	(1)
2023	FC Salyut Belgorod	11	(3)
2023	FC Tekstilshchik Ivanovo	14	(0)
- * Club domestic league appearances and goals

Viktor Olegovich Sergeyev (Russian: Виктор Олегович Сергеев; born 18 April 1993) is a Russian former football forward.

== Club career ==
He made his debut in the Russian Second Division for FC Sibir-2 Novosibirsk on 22 April 2013 in a game against FC Amur-2010 Blagoveshchensk.

He made his Russian Football National League debut for FC Olimpiyets Nizhny Novgorod on 17 March 2018 in a game against FC Orenburg.

== Honours ==
- 2016–17 Russian Professional Football League, Zone Center best player.
