= Aleksey Rogov (footballer) =

Russian footballer

Personal information
- Full name: Aleksey Valeryevich Rogov
- Date of birth: 8 May 1991 (age 35)
- Place of birth: Moscow, Soviet Union
- Height: 1.81 m (5 ft 11 in)
- Position: Forward

Youth career
- SDYuSShOR-63 Smena Moscow
- FC Lokomotiv Moscow
- FC Moscow

Senior career*
Years	Team	Apps	(Gls)
2012–2020	FSC Dolgoprudny	216	(46)
2020–2021	FC Olimp-Dolgoprudny	22	(5)
2021	FC Olimp-Dolgoprudny-2	20	(15)
2022	FC Tekstilshchik Ivanovo	6	(1)
2022	FC Kosmos Dolgoprudny	19	(8)
- * Club domestic league appearances and goals

Aleksey Valeryevich Rogov (Russian: Алексей Валерьевич Рогов; born 8 May 1991) is a Russian former football player.

== Club career ==
He made his debut in the Russian Football National League for FC Tekstilshchik Ivanovo on 6 March 2022 in a game against FC Alania Vladikavkaz.
