= Marat Shaymordanov =

Russian footballer

Personal information
- Full name: Marat Rafitovich Shaymordanov
- Date of birth: 14 April 1992 (age 34)
- Place of birth: Chelyabinsk, Russia
- Height: 1.76 m (5 ft 9 in)
- Position: Midfielder

Youth career
- SDYuShOR-3 Chelyabinsk

Senior career*
Years	Team	Apps	(Gls)
2009	FC Zenit-2-Kirovets Kopeysk		
2010–2013	FC Chelyabinsk	65	(7)
2013–2014	FC Tyumen	12	(1)
2014–2017	FC Chelyabinsk	58	(20)
2017–2019	FC Shinnik Yaroslavl	53	(9)
2019	FC Chayka Peschanokopskoye	10	(3)
2020–2023	FC Chelyabinsk	56	(17)
- * Club domestic league appearances and goals

Marat Rafitovich Shaymordanov (Russian: Марат Рафитович Шайморданов; born 14 April 1992) is a Russian former professional football player.

== Club career ==
He made his Russian Football National League debut for FC Shinnik Yaroslavl on 8 July 2017 in a game against FC Zenit-2 Saint Petersburg.
