= Anton Labutin =

Russian footballer

Personal information
- Full name: Anton Vasilyevich Labutin
- Date of birth: 23 November 1987 (age 38)
- Place of birth: Orenburg, Russian SFSR
- Height: 1.90 m (6 ft 3 in)
- Position: Goalkeeper

Senior career*
Years	Team	Apps	(Gls)
2006	FC Gazovik Orenburg	0	(0)
2007–2008	FC Gazovik-2 Orenburg (amateur)		
2009–2012	FC Gazovik Orenburg	5	(0)
2011	→ FC Sever Murmansk (loan)	11	(0)
2011–2017	FC Nosta Novotroitsk	87	(0)
- * Club domestic league appearances and goals

Anton Vasilyevich Labutin (Russian: Антон Васильевич Лабутин; born 23 November 1987) is a former Russian professional football player.

== Club career ==
He played in the Russian Football National League for FC Gazovik Orenburg in 2011.
