= Aleksandr Alekseyev (footballer) =

Russian football forward

Personal information
- Full name: Aleksandr Gennadyevich Alekseyev
- Date of birth: 23 August 1989 (age 37)
- Place of birth: Leningrad, Russian SFSR
- Height: 1.87 m (6 ft 2 in)
- Position: Forward

Senior career*
| Years | Team | Apps | (Gls) |
| 2007 | FC Smena-Zenit (amateur) | | |
| 2008 | FC Torpedo-Piter St. Petersburg | | |
| 2009 | FC Lavina Sertolovo | | |
| 2010 | FC Volkhov Veliky Novgorod | | |
| 2012 | JK Narva Trans | 28 | (10) |
| 2013 | FC Tosno | 0 | (0) |
| 2013–2016 | FC Pskov-747 | 66 | (22) |
| 2016–2020 | FC Tekstilshchik Ivanovo | 48 | (13) |
| 2021 | FC Tekstilshchik Ivanovo | 0 | (0) |
- * Club domestic league appearances and goals

Aleksandr Gennadyevich Alekseyev (Russian: Александр Геннадьевич Алексеев; born 23 August 1989) is a Russian former football forward.

== Club career ==
He made his debut in the Russian Second Division for FC Pskov-747 on 4 September 2013 in a game against FC Rus Saint Petersburg.

He made his Russian Football National League debut for FC Tekstilshchik Ivanovo on 5 October 2019 in a game against FC Armavir.
