= Denis Gudayev =

Russian footballer

Personal information
- Full name: Denis Vadimovich Gudayev
- Date of birth: 20 February 1991 (age 35)
- Place of birth: Klin, Russian SFSR
- Height: 1.84 m (6 ft 0 in)
- Position: Defender

Youth career
- –2006: DYuSSh Klin
- 2006–2007: FC FShM Torpedo Moscow
- 2007: FC Sportakademklub Moscow
- 2007–2009: FC Sibir Novosibirsk

Senior career*
Years	Team	Apps	(Gls)
2008	FC Sibir-2 Novosibirsk	0	(0)
2009	FC Sibir-LFK Novosibirsk		
2010	FC Sibir Novosibirsk	0	(0)
2010	→ FC Radian-Baikal Irkutsk (loan)	8	(0)
2011	FC Sibir-2 Novosibirsk	24	(1)
2012	FC Sibir Novosibirsk	2	(0)
2012–2013	FC Sibir-2 Novosibirsk	27	(2)
2015–2017	FC Biolog-Novokubansk Progress	62	(11)
2017	FC Chayka Peschanokopskoye	14	(0)
2018	FC Titan Klin (amateur)		
2020–2023	FC Zelenograd (amateur)		
- * Club domestic league appearances and goals

Denis Vadimovich Gudayev (Russian: Денис Вадимович Гудаев; born 20 February 1991) is a Russian former football player.

== Club career ==
He made his Russian Football National League debut for FC Sibir Novosibirsk on 11 April 2012 in a game against FC Shinnik Yaroslavl.
