= Edgaras Česnauskis =

Lithuanian footballer

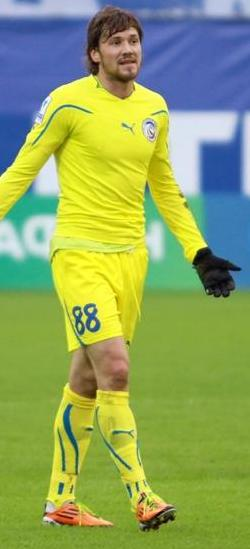
- Česnauskis in 2011

Personal information
- Date of birth: 5 February 1984 (age 42)
- Place of birth: Kuršėnai, Lithuanian SSR, Soviet Union
- Height: 1.82 m (6 ft 0 in)
- Positions: Winger; left midfielder

Senior career*
Years	Team	Apps	(Gls)
2000–2003	Ekranas	80	(4)
2004–2005	Dynamo Kyiv	5	(0)
2004	→ Dynamo-2 Kyiv	15	(2)
2006–2008	Saturn	52	(10)
2008–2009	Moscow	35	(5)
2010	Dynamo Moscow	22	(2)
2011–2015	Rostov	49	(1)

International career
2002–2003	Lithuania U21	5	(3)
2003–2013	Lithuania	43	(5)
- * Club domestic league appearances and goals

Edgaras Česnauskis (born 5 February 1984) is a Lithuanian former professional footballer who played as a winger.

== Club career ==
Česnauskis was born in Kuršėnai. He started his career in 2000 playing for his hometown team Ekranas. He played for Dynamo Kyiv from 2003 to 2005, however, he received limited playing time and was often excluded from the matchday squads, appearing in only 9 matches across all competitions for the Ukrainian club. In March 2006, he signed a three-year deal with Russian club Saturn Ramenskoye. He was a regular starter for the club, appearing in 52 league matches and scoring ten goals until May 2008, when he moved to league rival FC Moscow. After the club withdrew from the Russian Premier League in February 2010, Česnauskis signed for Dynamo Moscow prior to the 2010 season.

In March 2011, Česnauskis signed a contract with Rostov until June 2012. In July 2012 he signed a new three-year contract with the club from Rostov-on-Don. After being a regular starter in his first seasons at Rostov, he was relegated to a backup role in the 2013–14 season. After his contract ended in 2015, he retired from professional football.

== International career ==
Česnauskis made five appearances for the Lithuanian under-21 team, scoring three goals. He made his debut for the full national team aged 19, on 3 July 2003 against Estonia.

Until 2013, he earned 43 caps for his country, scoring five goals.

== Personal life ==
His older brother, Deividas, is also a former professional footballer.

== Career statistics ==
=== Club ===
As of 4 December 2014

Appearances and goals by club, season and competition
Club	Season	League			Cup		Continental		Other (Note: Appearances in Russian relegation play-offs and Russian Super Cup)		Total	
Club	Season	Division	Apps	Goals	Apps	Goals	Apps	Goals	Apps	Goals	Apps	Goals
Saturn Ramenskoye	2006	Russian Premier League	25	6			—		—		25	6
Saturn Ramenskoye	2007	Russian Premier League	22	4			—		—		22	4
Saturn Ramenskoye	2008	Russian Premier League	5	0			—		—		5	0
Saturn Ramenskoye	Total		52	10			0	0	0	0	52	10
FC Moscow	2008	Russian Premier League	10	1	3	1	3	0	—		16	2
FC Moscow	2009	Russian Premier League	25	4	1	1	—		—		26	5
FC Moscow	Total		35	5	4	2	3	0	0	0	42	7
Dynamo Moscow	2010	Russian Premier League	22	2	1	0	—		—		23	2
Rostov	2011–12	Russian Premier League	24	0	4	0	—		—		28	0
Rostov	2012–13	Russian Premier League	25	1	4	1	—		1	0	30	2
Rostov	2013–14	Russian Premier League	0	0	0	0	—		—		0	0
Rostov	2014–15	Russian Premier League	0	0	0	0	0	0	0	0	0	0
Rostov	Total		49	1	8	1	0	0	1	0	58	2
Career total			158	18	13	3	3	0	1	0	175	21

=== International ===
As of match played 10 September 2013

Appearances and goals by national team and year
National team	Year	Apps	Goals
Lithuania	2003	5	1
Lithuania	2004	8	0
Lithuania	2005	6	0
Lithuania	2006	0	0
Lithuania	2007	0	0
Lithuania	2008	2	0
Lithuania	2009	4	0
Lithuania	2010	3	0
Lithuania	2011	6	2
Lithuania	2012	5	2
Lithuania	2013	4	0
Lithuania	2014	0	0
Total		43	5

Scores and results list Lithuania's goal tally first, score column indicates score after each Česnauskis goal.

List of international goals scored by Edgaras Česnauskis
No.	Date	Venue	Opponent	Score	Result	Competition
1	3 July 2003	Tallinn, Estonia	Estonia	5–1	5–1	2003 Baltic Cup
2	25 March 2011	Kaunas, Lithuania	Poland	2-0	2-0	Friendly match
3	10 August 2011	Kaunas, Lithuania	Armenia	2-0	3-0	Friendly match
4	12 October 2012	Rheinpark Stadion, Vaduz, Liechtenstein	Liechtenstein	1–0	2–0	2014 FIFA World Cup Qualifier
5	12 October 2012	Rheinpark Stadion, Vaduz, Liechtenstein	Liechtenstein	2–0	2–0	2014 FIFA World Cup Qualifier
