= Artyom Semeykin =

Russian footballer

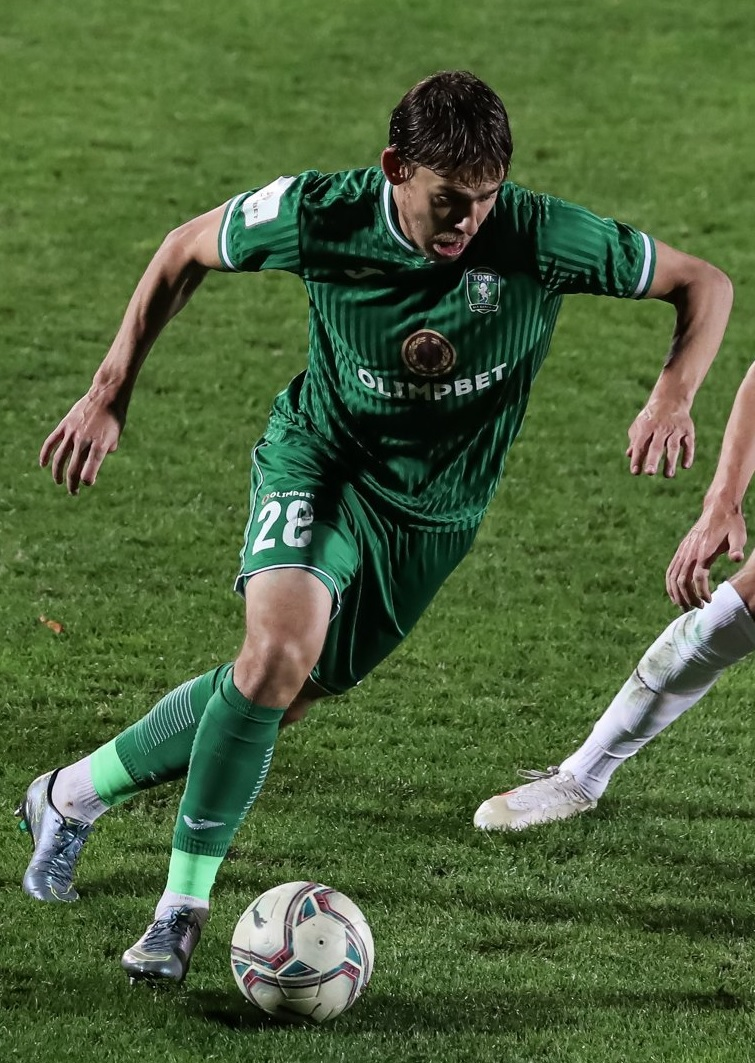
- Semeykin with Tom Tomsk in 2021

Personal information
- Full name: Artyom Yuryevich Semeykin
- Date of birth: 28 August 1996 (age 30)
- Place of birth: Belgorod, Russia
- Height: 1.85 m (6 ft 1 in)
- Position: Defender

Senior career*
Years	Team	Apps	(Gls)
2015–2018	FC Energomash Belgorod	59	(4)
2018–2019	FC Nizhny Novgorod	2	(0)
2019	→ FC Chayka Peschanokopskoye (loan)	9	(2)
2019–2020	FC Tyumen	15	(1)
2020–2021	FC Salyut Belgorod	24	(3)
2021	FC Tom Tomsk	20	(1)
2022–2023	FC Shinnik Yaroslavl	23	(0)
2023–2024	FC Salyut Belgorod	30	(3)
2024	FC Sokol Kazan	7	(0)
- * Club domestic league appearances and goals as of 19 October 2024

Artyom Yuryevich Semeykin (Russian: Артём Юрьевич Семейкин; born 28 August 1996) is a Russian football player.

== Club career ==
He made his debut in the Russian Professional Football League for FC Energomash Belgorod on 20 July 2015 in a game against FC Torpedo Moscow.

He made his Russian Football National League debut for FC Nizhny Novgorod on 8 September 2018 in a game against FC Spartak-2 Moscow.
