= Sergei Vasilyev (footballer) =

Russian footballer

Personal information
- Full name: Sergei Anatolyevich Vasilyev
- Date of birth: 3 November 1982 (age 44)
- Place of birth: Stary Oskol, Belgorod Oblast, Russian SFSR
- Height: 1.81 m (5 ft 11 1/2 in)
- Position: Midfielder

Senior career*
Years	Team	Apps	(Gls)
2001–2003	Metalist Kharkiv	14	(0)
2002–2003	→ Metalist-2 Kharkiv	23	(4)
2004	Naftan Novopolotsk	13	(0)
2005–2006	Gubkin	29	(3)
2006	Spartak Vladikavkaz	11	(1)
2007–2009	Zodiak-Oskol Stary Oskol	75	(21)
2010–2011	Fakel Voronezh	35	(3)
2012–2013	Metallurg-Oskol Stary Oskol	48	(14)
2014–2016	Tambov	42	(3)
2016–2017	Energomash Belgorod	14	(2)
- * Club domestic league appearances and goals

Sergei Anatolyevich Vasilyev (Russian: Серге́й Анатольевич Васильев; born 3 November 1982) is a former Russian professional football player.
