= Aleksandr Sidorichev =

Russian footballer

Personal information
- Full name: Aleksandr Valentinovich Sidorichev
- Date of birth: 8 February 1985 (age 41)
- Place of birth: Volgograd, Russian SFSR
- Height: 1.76 m (5 ft 9 in)
- Position: Defender

Senior career*
Years	Team	Apps	(Gls)
2005	FC Tsement Mikhaylovka (amateur)		
2008	FC Tsement Mikhaylovka (amateur)		
2008	FC Energetik Uren	21	(0)
2009	FC Volochanin-Ratmir Vyshny Volochyok	16	(1)
2009–2011	FC Khimik Dzerzhinsk	60	(9)
2012	FC Biolog-Novokubansk Progress	8	(1)
2012–2013	FC Chernomorets Novorossiysk	40	(1)
2014–2015	FC Dynamo GTS Stavropol	39	(0)
2016–2017	FC Rotor Volgograd	39	(2)
2018	FC Dynamo Stavropol	11	(1)
- * Club domestic league appearances and goals

Aleksandr Valentinovich Sidorichev (Russian: Александр Валентинович Сидоричев; born 8 February 1985) is a Russian former professional football player.

== Club career ==
He played in the Russian Football National League for FC Rotor Volgograd in 2017.
