= Nikita Pechyonkin =

Russian footballer

Personal information
- Full name: Nikita Andreyevich Pechyonkin
- Date of birth: 16 June 1997 (age 29)
- Place of birth: Yuzhnouralsk, Russia
- Height: 1.88 m (6 ft 2 in)
- Position: Defender

Team information
- Current team: Neftekhimik Nizhnekamsk
- Number: 6

Senior career*
Years	Team	Apps	(Gls)
2012–2013	Shakhtyor Korkino		
2013–2021	Chelyabinsk	133	(13)
2021–2023	Volgar Astrakhan	45	(1)
2023–2024	Tyumen	32	(1)
2024–2025	Arsenal Tula	13	(0)
2025	Tyumen	12	(1)
2025–2026	Sokol Saratov	33	(0)
2026–	Neftekhimik Nizhnekamsk	0	(0)
- * Club domestic league appearances and goals as of 16 May 2026

Nikita Andreyevich Pechyonkin (Russian: Никита Андреевич Печёнкин; born 16 June 1997) is a Russian football player who plays for Neftekhimik Nizhnekamsk.

== Club career ==
He made his debut in the Russian Football National League for Volgar Astrakhan on 14 August 2021 in a game against Krasnodar-2.
