= Aleksei Goryushkin =

Russian footballer

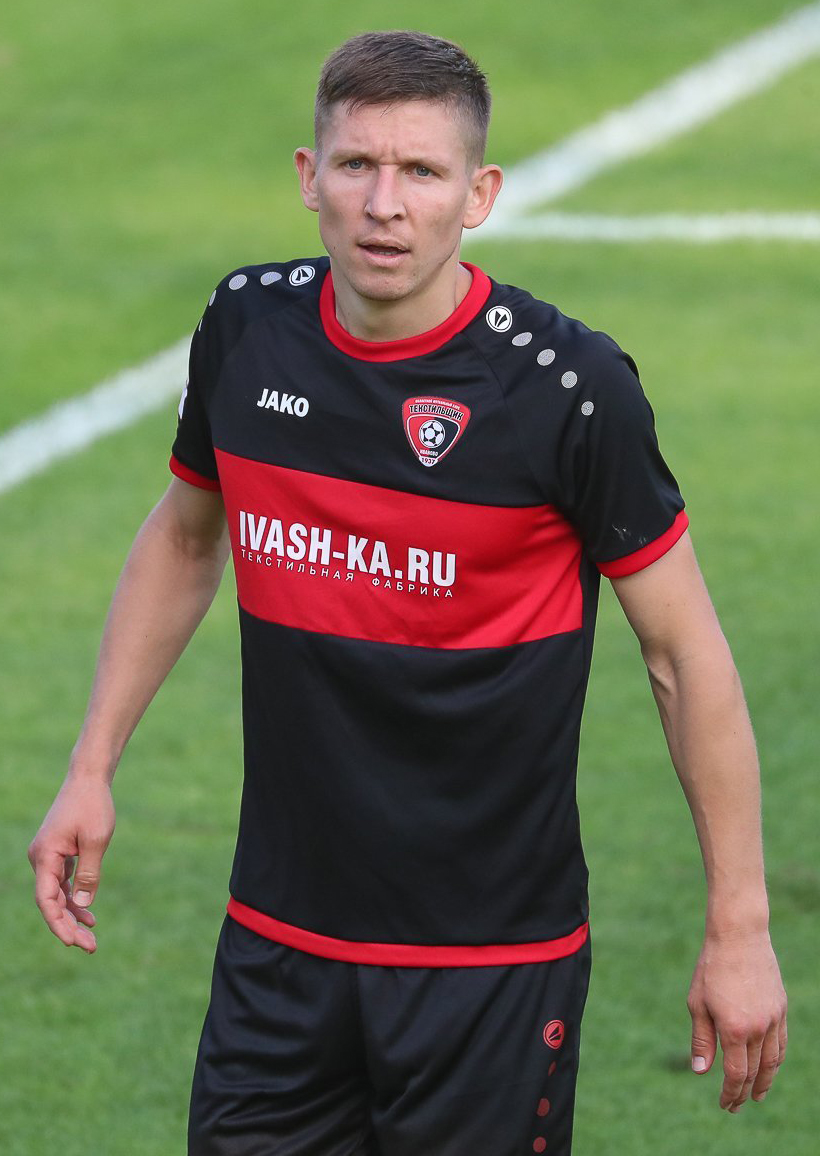

Personal information
- Full name: Aleksei Aleksandrovich Goryushkin
- Date of birth: 19 September 1988 (age 38)
- Place of birth: Kostroma, Russia
- Height: 1.78 m (5 ft 10 in)
- Position: Midfielder

Senior career*
Years	Team	Apps	(Gls)
2007	FC Spartak-2 Kostroma		
2008	FC Dynamo Kostroma (amateur)		
2009–2017	FC Spartak Kostroma	218	(36)
2017–2022	FC Tekstilshchik Ivanovo	146	(11)
2022–2023	FC Forte Taganrog	28	(1)
2023–2025	FC Dynamo Kirov	66	(6)
- * Club domestic league appearances and goals

Aleksei Aleksandrovich Goryushkin (Russian: Алексей Александрович Горюшкин; born 19 September 1988) is a Russian former professional football player.

== Club career ==
He made his Russian Football National League debut for FC Tekstilshchik Ivanovo on 7 July 2019 in a game against FC Yenisey Krasnoyarsk.
