= Ivan Selemenev =

Russian footballer

Personal information
- Full name: Ivan Aleksandrovich Selemenev
- Date of birth: 24 December 1996 (age 29)
- Place of birth: Stavropol, Russia
- Height: 1.82 m (6 ft 0 in)
- Position: Left winger

Team information
- Current team: Mashuk-KMV Pyatigorsk
- Number: 11

Senior career*
Years	Team	Apps	(Gls)
2015–2017	Dynamo Stavropol	22	(2)
2017–2018	Afips Afipsky	8	(0)
2017–2018	→ Chernomorets Novorossiysk (loan)	23	(1)
2018–2019	Chernomorets Novorossiysk	24	(3)
2019	Dunav Ruse	13	(1)
2020	Zenit Irkutsk	10	(1)
2021	Biolog-Novokubansk	32	(12)
2022–2023	Rodina Moscow	11	(0)
2022	Rodina-2 Moscow	5	(0)
2022–2023	→ Tekstilshchik Ivanovo (loan)	22	(2)
2023–2025	Tekstilshchik Ivanovo	58	(8)
2025–	Mashuk-KMV Pyatigorsk	42	(9)
- * Club domestic league appearances and goals as of 15 November 2026

Ivan Aleksandrovich Selemenev (Russian: Иван Александрович Селеменев; born 24 December 1996) is a Russian professional footballer who plays as a left winger for Mashuk-KMV Pyatigorsk.

== Career ==
He made his debut in the Russian Professional Football League for FC Dynamo Stavropol on 5 October 2015 in a game against FC Astrakhan. For Dinamo he played until 2017.

After Dinamo, Selemenev played for FC Afips Afipsky in 2017, but while at Afips, he was loaned out to FC Chernomorets Novorossiysk.

After his loan ended, he left Afips and signed with Chernomorets in July 2018.

On 24 June 2019, Selemenev signed with Dunav Ruse.

== Career statistics ==
As of match played 11 November 2018

Club	Season	League	League		Cup		Continental		Total	
Club	Season	League	Apps	Goals	Apps	Goals	Apps	Goals	Apps	Goals
Dynamo Stavropol	2015–16	Russian Professional Football League	6	0	1	0	—		7	0
Dynamo Stavropol	2016–17	Russian Professional Football League	16	2	1	1	—		17	3
Dynamo Stavropol	Total		22	2	2	1	—		24	3
Afips Afipsky	2016–17	Russian Professional Football League	8	0	—		—		8	0
Chernomorets Novorossiysk	2017–18	Russian Professional Football League	23	1	1	0	—		24	1
Chernomorets Novorossiysk	2018–19	Russian Professional Football League	16	2	4	0	—		20	2
Total			39	3	5	0	—		44	3
Career total			69	5	7	1	—		76	6
