= Yevgeni Smirnov (footballer, born 1986) =

Russian-Belarusian footballer

Personal information
- Full name: Yevgeni Aleksandrovich Smirnov
- Date of birth: 4 January 1986 (age 40)
- Place of birth: Vologda, Russian SFSR
- Height: 1.81 m (5 ft 11 1/2 in)
- Position: Defender

Senior career*
Years	Team	Apps	(Gls)
2002–2006	Lokomotiv Minsk	15	(1)
2002	→ SKVICH Minsk	12	(0)
2004	→ Lida (loan)	13	(2)
2006	→ Tekstilshchik-Telekom Ivanovo (loan)	11	(0)
2007	Spartak-UGP Anapa	6	(0)
2007	Don Novomoskovsk	4	(0)
2008	Darida Minsk Raion	24	(0)
2009–2010	Tekstilshchik Ivanovo	37	(0)
2010–2011	Vologda (amateur)		
2012–2013	Iskra-Stal Rîbnița	13	(0)
2013–2014	Blumenstok Vologda (amateur)		
2015–2017	Cherepovets (amateur)		
2018	4 sada (amateur)		
2019–2020	SDYuSShOR Vologda (amateur)		
2021	Dynamo Vologda (amateur)		

Managerial career
- 2013–2014: Blumenstok Vologda
- 2018: 4 sada
- 2019–2020: SDYuSShOR Vologda (amateur)
- 2021–2023: Dynamo Vologda (assistant)
- * Club domestic league appearances and goals

Yevgeni Aleksandrovich Smirnov (Russian: Евгений Александрович Смирнов; born 4 January 1986) is a former Russian professional football player.
