= Pavel Yesikov =

Russian footballer

Personal information
- Full name: Pavel Viktorovich Yesikov
- Date of birth: 29 January 1988 (age 38)
- Place of birth: Moscow, Russian SFSR
- Height: 1.85 m (6 ft 1 in)
- Position: Forward

Youth career
- FC Moscow

Senior career*
Years	Team	Apps	(Gls)
2005–2009	FC Moscow	0	(0)
2009	→ FC Volgar-Gazprom-2 Astrakhan (loan)	15	(1)
2010–2011	FC Volgar-Gazprom Astrakhan	9	(0)
2010	→ FC Astrakhan (loan)	11	(6)
2011	→ FC Chernomorets Novorossiysk (loan)	17	(0)
2011–2014	FC Avangard Kursk	93	(12)
2015	FSK Dolgoprudny	10	(2)
2015–2016	FC Avangard Kursk	24	(4)
2016–2017	FC Sakhalin Yuzhno-Sakhalinsk	20	(1)
2017	FC Dynamo Stavropol	13	(0)
2018–2020	FC Sakhalin Yuzhno-Sakhalinsk	38	(8)
- * Club domestic league appearances and goals

Pavel Viktorovich Yesikov (Russian: Павел Викторович Есиков; born 29 January 1988) is a Russian former professional football player.

== Club career ==
He made his Russian Football National League debut for FC Volgar-Gazprom Astrakhan on 9 August 2009 in a game against FC Shinnik Yaroslavl.
