= Yevgeni Smirnov (footballer, born 1994) =

Russian footballer

Personal information
- Full name: Yevgeni Aleksandrovich Smirnov
- Date of birth: 27 May 1994 (age 32)
- Place of birth: Vladivostok, Russia
- Height: 1.85 m (6 ft 1 in)
- Position: Defender

Youth career
- FC Luch-Energiya Vladivostok

Senior career*
| Years | Team | Apps | (Gls) |
| 2014–2016 | FC Yakutiya Yakutsk | 46 | (3) |
| 2016 | FC Nosta Novotroitsk | 12 | (1) |
| 2017 | FC Luch-Energiya Vladivostok | 1 | (0) |
| 2018–2019 | FC Krymteplytsia Molodizhne | 20 | (0) |
- * Club domestic league appearances and goals

Yevgeni Aleksandrovich Smirnov (Russian: Евгений Александрович Смирнов; born 27 May 1994) is a Russian former football player.

== Club career ==
He made his professional debut in the Russian Professional Football League for FC Yakutiya Yakutsk on 23 April 2014 in a game against FC Sibir-2 Novosibirsk.

He made his Russian Football National League debut for FC Luch-Energiya Vladivostok on 29 October 2017 in a game against FC Tom Tomsk.
