= Maksim Kirsanov =

Russian footballer

Personal information
- Full name: Maksim Konstantinovich Kirsanov
- Date of birth: 8 May 1987 (age 39)
- Height: 1.81 m (5 ft 11 in)
- Position: Defender

Youth career
- 2004–2006: FShM-Torpedo Moscow

Senior career*
Years	Team	Apps	(Gls)
2007–2011	FC Torpedo Moscow	71	(1)
2011–2012	FC Vityaz Podolsk	22	(2)
2012–2013	FC Petrotrest Saint Petersburg	32	(0)
2013–2014	FC Dynamo Saint Petersburg	48	(1)
2014–2015	FC Vityaz Podolsk	21	(1)
2016–2017	FC Domodedovo Moscow	26	(0)
2017	FC Zugdidi	18	(1)
2018–2019	FC Peresvet Domodedovo		

International career
2005	Russia U19	2	(0)
- * Club domestic league appearances and goals

Maksim Konstantinovich Kirsanov (Russian: Максим Константинович Кирсанов; born 8 May 1987) is a Russian former professional football player.

== Club career ==
He played 3 seasons in the Russian Football National League for FC Torpedo Moscow, FC Petrotrest Saint Petersburg and FC Dynamo Saint Petersburg.
