= Yuri Petrakov =

Swedish-born Russian footballer

Personal information
- Full name: Yuri Valeryevich Petrakov
- Date of birth: 27 January 1991 (age 35)
- Place of birth: Luleå, Sweden
- Height: 1.78 m (5 ft 10 in)
- Position: Midfielder

Youth career
- FC Torpedo Moscow

Senior career*
Years	Team	Apps	(Gls)
2006–2007	FC Torpedo Moscow	0	(0)
2008	FC Torpedo (Youth) Moscow (D4)		
2009	PFC CSKA Moscow	0	(0)
2009	FC Moscow	0	(0)
2010	FC Dynamo Moscow	0	(0)
2011	FC Sheriff Tiraspol	0	(0)
2011–2012	FC Dynamo Bryansk	20	(0)
2012–2015	FC Tom Tomsk	7	(0)
2013	→ FC Khimik Dzerzhinsk (loan)	0	(0)
2015	→ FC Tom-2 Tomsk	0	(0)
2015–2016	FC Torpedo Moscow	20	(2)
2016–2017	FC Luch-Energiya Vladivostok	6	(0)
2017–2018	FC Tom Tomsk	3	(0)
2018	FC Znamya Truda Orekhovo-Zuyevo	2	(0)

International career
2009–2010	Russia U-19	4	(1)
2011	Russia U-20	6	(1)
- * Club domestic league appearances and goals

Yuri Valeryevich Petrakov (Russian: Юрий Валерьевич Петраков; born 27 January 1991) is a Russian former football midfielder.

== Club career ==
He spent some time on the roster of four different Russian Premier League teams from Moscow without playing a single game for the senior squad.

He made his debut in the Russian Football National League for FC Dynamo Bryansk on 9 August 2011 in a game against FC Fakel Voronezh.

== Personal life ==
He is a son of Valeriy Petrakov, who was playing in Sweden with IFK Luleå when Yuri was born.
