= Vladimir Kirsanov (dancer) =

Russian dancer (1947–2021)

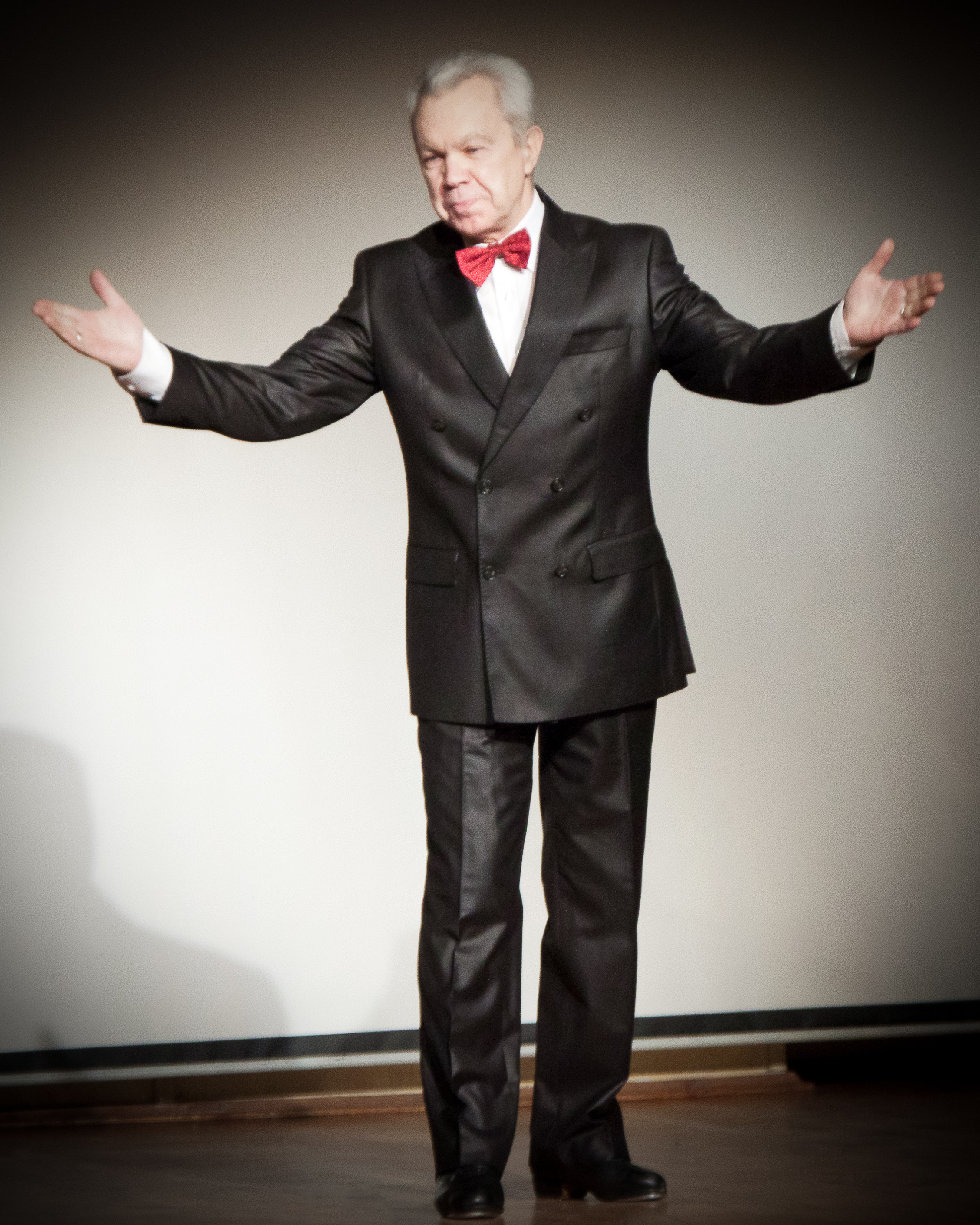
Vladimir Kirsanov

Vladimir Kirsanov (13 August 1947 – 20 March 2021) was a Russian choreographer and dancer.

== Biography ==
He was awarded the title of Merited Artist of the Russian Federation. He studied at the State School of Circus and Variety Arts. Kirsanov died on 20 March 2021 in Moscow, after suffering from COVID-19.
