= Dmitri Agaptsev =

Russian football forward

Personal information
- Full name: Dmitri Alekseyevich Agaptsev
- Date of birth: 29 November 1991 (age 34)
- Height: 1.80 m (5 ft 11 in)
- Position: Forward

Team information
- Current team: SShOR Balashikha

Youth career
- FC Moscow

Senior career*
Years	Team	Apps	(Gls)
2009	FC Moscow	0	(0)
2010	FC Moscow (amateur)		
2011	FC Stolitsa Moscow		
2011	FC Zenit Penza	8	(0)
2013–2014	FC MITOS Novocherkassk	41	(11)
2014	FC Sokol Saratov	16	(2)
2015–2016	FC Lokomotiv Liski	30	(6)
2016–2017	FC Domodedovo Moscow	10	(2)
2018	FC Torpedo Vladimir	8	(2)
2021–	SShOR Balashikha		
- * Club domestic league appearances and goals as of 27 May 2018

Dmitri Alekseyevich Agaptsev (Russian: Дмитрий Алексеевич Агапцев; born 29 November 1991) is a Russian football forward. He plays for SShOR Balashikha.

== Club career ==
He made his debut in the Russian Second Division for FC Zenit Penza on 5 August 2011 in a game against FC Sokol Saratov.

He made his Russian Football National League debut for FC Sokol Saratov on 6 July 2014 in a game against FC Yenisey Krasnoyarsk.
