= Energomash Stadium =

Stadium

Salyut Stadium
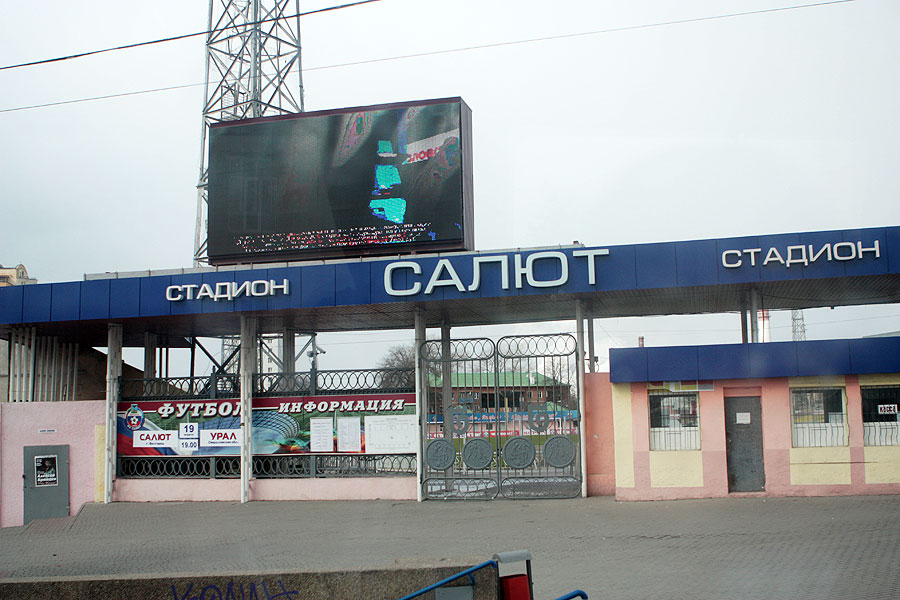
- Interactive map of Salyut Stadium
- Location: Bohdan Khmelnytsky Avenue, 107, Belgorod, Russia
- Coordinates: 50°36′09.68″N 36°34′45.14″E
- Capacity: 11,456
- Field size: 104 by 68 metres (341 ft × 223 ft)

Construction
- Opened: 1959
- Renovated: 1999

Tenant
- FC Salyut Belgorod

The Salyut Stadium (Russian: Стадион Энергомаш) is a multi-purpose stadium in Belgorod, Russia. It is currently used mostly for football matches and is the home ground of FC Salyut Belgorod. The stadium holds 11,456 people. It is located in the center of Belgorod near the bus stop "Stadion". Renovated in 1999. Designed for football.
