= FC Energomash Belgorod =

Russian football club

- Full name: Football Club Energomash Belgorod
- Nickname(s): new Belgorod, blue-white,
- Founded: 2014
- Dissolved: 2018
- Ground: Salyut Stadium
- Capacity: 11,456
- Owner: Gennadi Bobritsky / Vladimir Zakharov / Tatyana Tebekina
- Chairman: Aleksandr Kokorev
- 2017–18: PFL, Zone Center, 2nd

FC Energomash Belgorod (Russian: ФК "Энергомаш" Белгород) was a Russian football team based in Belgorod. It was founded in 2014 after the previous Belgorod team FC Salyut Belgorod went bankrupt. For 2015–16 season, it advanced to the professional level, the third-tier Russian Professional Football League. It was dissolved after the 2017–18 season. Following that, FC Salyut Belgorod entered professional competition once again.
