= 2020–21 Russian Cup =

Tournament details
- Country: Russia
- Teams: 90

Final positions
- Champions: Lokomotiv Moscow (9th title)
- Runners-up: Krylia Sovetov Samara

Tournament statistics
- Matches played: 99
- Goals scored: 260 (2.63 per match)
- All statistics correct as of 12 May 2021.

The 2020–21 Russian Cup was the 29th season of the Russian football knockout tournament since the dissolution of the Soviet Union. The competition started on 5 August 2020 and concluded on 12 May 2021.

== Representation of clubs by league ==
- Russian Premier League: 16 clubs
- National Football League: 20 clubs
- Russian Professional Football League 54 clubs
- Due to the difficult epidemiological situation caused by the COVID-19 pandemic, amateur clubs do not participate in the cup.
- Total - 90 clubs.

== Qualifying round ==
=== 1/256 Round ===
At this stage, the PFL teams enter the tournament, which are distributed along the cup grid. The draw for the qualifying round (1/256 and 1/128 finals) was held at the House of Football on July 29, it determined the home team in the previously drawn tournament grid.

West-Center

5 August 2020 Qualifying round	FC Metallurg Vidnoye	1–0	FC Kvant Obninsk
14:00 MSK (UTC+3)	Barbashov 45+3' (pen.)	Report		Attendance: 0

5 August 2020 Qualifying round	FC Rodina Moscow	3–2	FC Strogino Moscow
15:00 MSK (UTC+3)	Vladislav Volkov 66' (pen.); Artyom Sukhanov 69'; Mikhail Maltsev 80'		Vladislav Agalakov 30'; Nikita Katayev 77' (o.g.)

5 August 2020 Qualifying round	FC Saturn Ramenskoye	0–3	FC Kolomna
15:00 MSK (UTC+3)			Orlov 45' (pen.), 65'; Veber 67'

5 August 2020 Qualifying round	FC Tver	0–0 (3–4 p)	FC Zvezda Saint Petersburg
17:00 MSK (UTC+3)

5 August 2020 Qualifying round	FC Znamya Truda Orekhovo-Zuyevo	0–1	FC Znamya Noginsk
17:00 MSK (UTC+3)			Pavlyuchenko 49'

5 August 2020 Qualifying round	FC Murom	2–1	FC Ryazan
18:00 MSK (UTC+3)	Shalin 9' (pen.), 54'		Timur Dudayti 45'

5 August 2020 Qualifying round	FC Krasny	0–3 (awarded)	FC Luki-Energiya Velikiye Luki
18:30 MSK (UTC+3)

5 August 2020 Qualifying round	FC Kaluga	3–2	FC Smolensk
19:00 MSK (UTC+3)	Aleksandr Novitsky 18'; Volgin 43'; Denis Romanyuk 80'		Vasilyev 28'; Tsygankov 53' (pen.)

Ural-Povolzhye

5 August 2020 Qualifying round	FC Lada-Togliatti	0–3	FC Volna Nizhny Novgorod Oblast
16:00 MSK (UTC+3)			Anton Frolov 35'; Daniil Khramov 62'; Rudakov 89'

5 August 2020 Qualifying round	FC Zenit-Izhevsk	1–2	FC Tyumen
16:00 MSK (UTC+3)	Makar Kabakov 85'		Katsalapov 32'; Biryukov 56'

South

5 August 2020 Qualifying round	FC Anzhi Makhachkala	1–0	FC Makhachkala
16:30 MSK (UTC+3)	Sultan Isalov 44'

5 August 2020 Qualifying round	FC Tuapse	0–2	FC Kuban Krasnodar
16:30 MSK (UTC+3)			Gruznov 17'; Chabanov 19'

5 August 2020 Qualifying round	PFC Spartak Nalchik	5–0	FC Yessentuki
18:00 MSK (UTC+3)	Guguyev 10', 17'; Pashtov 59' (pen.), 87' (pen.); Alan Khachirov 66'

5 August 2020 Qualifying round	FC Forte Taganrog	0–1	FC Kuban-Holding Pavlovskaya
19:00 MSK (UTC+3)			Zaikin 83'

=== 1/128 Round ===
West-Center

19 August 2020 Qualifying round	FC Zvezda Saint Petersburg	1–2	FC Leningradets
13:00 MSK (UTC+3)	Igor Smirnov 45'		Umarov 62'; Pinchuk 87'

19 August 2020 Qualifying round	FC Metallurg Lipetsk	0–3 (awarded)	FC Znamya Noginsk

19 August 2020 Qualifying round	FC Luki-Energiya Velikiye Luki	1–1 (4–5 p)	FC Olimp-Dolgoprudny
17:00 MSK (UTC+3)	Anton Shishayev 65'		Ivan Ovsyankin 54' (o.g.)

19 August 2020 Qualifying round	FC Kolomna	2–0	FC Sakhalin Yuzhno-Sakhalinsk
17:30 MSK (UTC+3)	Kalikhanov 54'; Stukanov 77'

19 August 2020 Qualifying round	FC Salyut Belgorod	1–0	FC Metallurg Vidnoye
18:00 MSK (UTC+3)	Denis Gribanov 10'

19 August 2020 Qualifying round	FC Sokol Saratov	2–1	FC Murom
18:00 MSK (UTC+3)	Igor Bugayenko 12'; Albert Pogosyan 70'		Denis Santalov 41'

19 August 2020 Qualifying round	FC Torpedo Vladimir	0–2	FC Rodina Moscow
18:00 MSK (UTC+3)			Abdusalamov 85'; Pichugin 90'

19 August 2020 Qualifying round	FC Avangard Kursk	1–2	FC Kaluga
18:30 MSK (UTC+3)	Mashukov 21'		Avagimyan 14'; Dmitry Dyomin 68'

East

19 August 2020 Qualifying round	FC Chita	0–1	FC Zenit Irkutsk
12:30 MSK (UTC+3)			Vladimir Markov 29'

19 August 2020 Qualifying round	FC Novosibirsk	1–0	FC Dynamo Barnaul
15:00 MSK (UTC+3)	Kositsin 62'

Ural-Povolzhye

19 August 2020 Qualifying round	FC Chelyabinsk	3–0 (awarded)	FC Nosta Novotroitsk

19 August 2020 Qualifying round	FC Tyumen	1–2	FC Zvezda Perm
16:00 MSK (UTC+3)	Gilyazetdinov 18'		Subbotin 35'; Nikita Goldobin 38'

19 August 2020 Qualifying round	FC KAMAZ Naberezhnye Chelny	1–1 (4–2 p)	FC Lada Dimitrovgrad
17:00 MSK (UTC+3)	Gagloyev 27' (pen.)		Yusupov 69'

19 August 2020 Qualifying round	FC Volna Nizhny Novgorod Oblast	0–0 (1–4 p)	FC Volga Ulyanovsk
17:00 MSK (UTC+3)

South

19 August 2020 Qualifying round	FC Legion Dynamo Makhachkala	1–0	FC Anzhi Makhachkala
16:00 MSK (UTC+3)	Raul Shikhayev 71'

19 August 2020 Qualifying round	FC Biolog-Novokubansk	3–0	FC Druzhba Maykop
17:00 MSK (UTC+3)	Khodunov 20'; Ruslan Takliyev 67' (o.g.); Yevgeny Okhrimenko 90'

19 August 2020 Qualifying round	PFC Dynamo Stavropol	4–1	PFC Spartak Nalchik
18:00 MSK (UTC+3)	Andrey Ustyuzhanin 38'; Krutov 68'; Zalimkhan Maysultanov 88'; Albert Kurachinov 90'		Kantemir Batsev 90'

19 August 2020 Qualifying round	FC Inter Cherkessk	2–3	FC Mashuk-KMV Pyatigorsk
18:00 MSK (UTC+3)	Ivan Nikonov 21'; Deni Daliyev 56'		Aleksandr Karibov 31'; Kabulov 43'; Zaur Tsakoyev 67'

19 August 2020 Qualifying round	FC Kuban Krasnodar	1–4	FC Chernomorets Novorossiysk
18:30 MSK (UTC+3)	Gruznov 90'		Rizvan Akhmedkhanov 45'; Nikita Panamaryov 47'; Ratmir Mashezov 52'; Aleksey Bartsov 57'

19 August 2020 Qualifying round	FC SKA Rostov-on-Don	2–4	FC Kuban-Holding Pavlovskaya
19:00 MSK (UTC+3)	Gongadze 37'; Sergey Garanzha 62'		Dyshekov 6' (pen.), 59'; Zaikin 75', 90'

=== 1/64 ===
At this stage, the FNL teams enter the tournament, they determine 10 winners among themselves. The PFL teams also determine 10 winners among themselves.

==== FNL teams ====
The draw for the 1/64 finals of the Russian Cup for FNL clubs took place on 5 August. Based on its results, pairs were formed and the hosts of the matches were determined.

26 August 2020 Qualifying round	FC SKA-Khabarovsk	0–0 (8–7 p)	FC Fakel Voronezh
12:00 MSK (UTC+3)

26 August 2020 Qualifying round	FC Tom Tomsk	0–1	FC Nizhny Novgorod
14:30 MSK (UTC+3)			Popov 4'

26 August 2020 Qualifying round	FC Akron Tolyatti	0–1	FC Chertanovo Moscow
15:00 MSK (UTC+3)			Levin 6'

26 August 2020 Qualifying round	FC Yenisey Krasnoyarsk	2–1	FC Volgar Astrakhan
15:00 MSK (UTC+3)	Lescano 75'; Dvornikov 90'		Khomukha 6'

26 August 2020 Qualifying round	FC Orenburg	2–1	FC Alania Vladikavkaz
17:00 MSK (UTC+3)	Kozlov 19'; Fameyeh 24'		Gurtsiyev 47'

26 August 2020 Qualifying round	PFC Krylia Sovetov Samara	5–0	FC Irtysh Omsk
17:30 MSK (UTC+3)	Golenkov 2'; Krikunenko 14' (o.g.); Kabutov 39'; Sergeyev 54'; Soldatenkov 90'

26 August 2020 Qualifying round	FC Neftekhimik Nizhnekamsk	0–1	FC Dynamo Bryansk
18:00 MSK (UTC+3)			Pikatov 84'

26 August 2020 Qualifying round	FC Veles Moscow	4–1	FC Baltika Kaliningrad
18:30 MSK (UTC+3)	Stefanovich 40', 49'; Galoyan 74', 88'		Nailson 12'

26 August 2020 Qualifying round	FC Chayka Peschanokopskoye	0–2	FC Tekstilshchik Ivanovo
19:00 MSK (UTC+3)			Moseychuk 45'; Sidorov 81'

26 August 2020 Qualifying round	FC Torpedo Moscow	1–2	FC Shinnik Yaroslavl
19:30 MSK (UTC+3)	Adayev 79'		Kutin 9', 44'

==== PFL Teams ====
East

2 September 2020 Qualifying round	FC Zenit Irkutsk	1–1 (4–3 p)	FC Novosibirsk
12:30 MSK (UTC+3)	Ivan Yakovlev 62'		Narylkov 56'

West-Center

2 September 2020 Qualifying round	FC Leningradets Leningrad Oblast	2–1	FC Olimp-Dolgoprudny
13:00 MSK (UTC+3)	Sergey Nikolayev 66'; Khlusov 85'		Gorbanets 8'

2 September 2020 Qualifying round	FC Znamya Noginsk	0–0 (6–5 p)	FC Sokol Saratov
16:00 MSK (UTC+3)

2 September 2020 Qualifying round	FC Kolomna	2–3	FC Rodina Moscow
17:00 MSK (UTC+3)	Artemchuk 30', 88'		Mikhail Maltsev 64', 83'; Kirill Dubnikov 74'

2 September 2020 Qualifying round	FC Kaluga	0–0 (6–7 p)	FC Salyut Belgorod
18:00 MSK (UTC+3)

South

2 September 2020 Qualifying round	FC Mashuk-KMV Pyatigorsk	2–1	FC Legion Dynamo Makhachkala
16:15 MSK (UTC+3)	Kabulov 33'; Shumakhov 90'		Udunyan 64'

2 September 2020 Qualifying round	FC Kuban-Holding Pavlovskaya	3–4	PFC Dynamo Stavropol
18:00 MSK (UTC+3)	Zhabkin 58', 62'; Dyshekov 72' (pen.)		Denis Vasenin 44'; Tsarukyan 51'; Ionov 79'; Albert Kurachinov 89'

2 September 2020 Qualifying round	FC Chernomorets Novorossiysk	4–0	FC Biolog-Novokubansk
18:30 MSK (UTC+3)	Rizvan Akhmedkhanov 3' (pen.); Ratmir Mashezov 73'; Aleksey Bartsov 89'; Gudisa Smyr 90'

Ural-Povolzhye

2 September 2020 Qualifying round	FC Zvezda Perm	3–1	FC Chelyabinsk
16:00 MSK (UTC+3)	Tyukalov 3'; Nikita Goldobin 75' (pen.); Abdrashitov 81'		Aleksey Pipo 84'

2 September 2020 Qualifying round	FC Volga Ulyanovsk	2–0	FC KAMAZ Naberezhnye Chelny
17:00 MSK (UTC+3)	Karpukhin 15'; Karpuk 90'

== Elite group round (1/32 and 1/16 finals) ==
At this stage, 10 RPL teams enter the tournament, not playing in European competition. They are joined by 10 FNL teams and 10 PFL teams, winners of the last stage of the cup. The selection takes place in 10 groups. Each group contains one team from RPL, FNL and PFL.

The draw for the participants in the elite group round took place on 4 September.

The group stage will be held in 3 rounds. At the same time, teams from the lower leagues will play matches at home:

- 1st round. September 15-17 and 23. PFL teams - RPL teams.
- 2nd round. September 30 - October 1. PFL teams - FNL teams.
- 3rd round. October 21-22. FNL teams - RPL teams.

The system of scoring and determining the winners in the group round based on the results of each match:

- for winning in regulation time - 3 points.
- for a draw in regulation time and a victory on penalties - 2 points.
- for a draw in regulation time and defeat on penalties - 1 point.
- points are not awarded for a defeat in regular time.

=== Group 1 ===
Pos	Team	Pld	W	D	L	GF	GA	GD	Pts	Qualification
1	Ural (Q)	2	2	0	0	6	1	+5	6	Advance to Play-off
2	Veles Moscow	2	1	0	1	5	5	0	3	
3	Volga Ulyanovsk	2	0	0	2	2	7	−5	0	

(Q) Qualified for the phase indicated

16 September 2020 Group Stage	Volga Ulyanovsk	0–3	Ural	Ulyanovsk
17:00 MSK (UTC+3)			Panyukov 15', 44' (pen.); Karayev 90'	Stadium: Trud Stadium

30 September 2020 Group Stage	Volga Ulyanovsk	2–4	Veles Moscow	Ulyanovsk
16:00 MSK (UTC+3)	Rakhamanov 80' (pen.); Karpuk 90+3' (pen.)		Aliyev 2', 19', 87'; Stefanovich 41'	Stadium: Trud Stadium

21 October 2020 Group Stage	Veles Moscow	1–3	Ural	Domodedovo
14:00 MSK (UTC+3)	Maksimenko 54'		Bicfalvi 86', 89', 90+4'	Stadium: Avangard Stadium

=== Group 2 ===
Pos	Team	Pld	W	D	L	GF	GA	GD	Pts	Qualification
1	Spartak Moscow (Q)	2	1	0	1	5	2	+3	3	Advance to Play-off
2	Rodina Moscow	2	1	0	1	4	5	−1	3	
3	Yenisey Krasnoyarsk	2	1	0	1	1	3	−2	3	

(Q) Qualified for the phase indicated

16 September 2020 Group Stage	Rodina Moscow	1–5	Spartak Moscow	Moscow
19:00 MSK (UTC+3)	Abdusalamov 61'		Sobolev 35'; Urunov 53'; Ayrton 56'; Zobnin 59'; Ponce 80'	Stadium: Otkritie Arena

30 September 2020 Group Stage	Rodina Moscow	3–0	Yenisey Krasnoyarsk	Moscow
13:00 MSK (UTC+3)	Lopatin 17'; Eremenko 72'; Pichugin 90'			Stadium: Yantar Stadium

21 October 2020 Group Stage	Yenisey Krasnoyarsk	1–0	Spartak Moscow	Krasnoyarsk
15:00 MSK (UTC+3)	Lescano 47'			Stadium: Central Stadium

=== Group 3 ===
Pos	Team	Pld	W	PW	PL	L	GF	GA	GD	Pts	Final result
1	Arsenal Tula (Q)	2	0	2	0	0	1	1	0	4	Advance to Play-off
2	Tekstilshchik Ivanovo	2	1	0	1	0	3	0	+3	4	
3	Salyut Belgorod	2	0	0	1	1	1	4	−3	1	

Rules for classification: 1) Points; 2) Wins; 3) Goal differential; 4) Goals scored; 5) Head-to-head result; 6) Disciplinary points.
(Q) Qualified to the phase indicated

23 September 2020 Group Stage	Salyut Belgorod	1–1 (3–4 p)	Arsenal Tula	Belgorod
17:00 MSK (UTC+3)	Burykin 64'		Panteleyev 62'	Stadium: Energomash Stadium
	Penalties
	Burykin (penalty scored); Semeykin (penalty scored); Yesin (penalty missed); Dyogtev (penalty scored); Ivanteev (penalty missed); Masterov (penalty missed)		Kombarov (penalty scored); Čaušić (penalty scored); Gorbatenko (penalty missed); Grigalava (penalty missed); Panteleyev (penalty scored); Kavalyow (penalty scored)

30 September 2020 Group Stage	Salyut Belgorod	0–3	Tekstilshchik Ivanovo	Belgorod
17:00 MSK (UTC+3)			Appayev 14', 34'; Goryushkin 30'	Stadium: Energomash Stadium

21 October 2020 Group Stage	Tekstilshchik Ivanovo	0–0 (3–4 p)	Arsenal Tula	Moscow
15:00 MSK (UTC+3)				Stadium: Akademiya «Spartak» po futbolu im.F.F.Cherenkova
	Penalties
	Fomin (penalty missed); Romanenko (penalty scored); Mnatsakanyan (penalty scored); Appayev (penalty scored); Sidorov (penalty missed)		Burlak (penalty scored); Bauer (penalty scored); Panchenko (penalty scored); Lomovitskiy (penalty scored)

=== Group 4 ===
Pos	Team	Pld	W	PW	PL	L	GF	GA	GD	Pts	Final result
1	Ufa (Q)	2	2	0	0	0	5	0	+5	6	Advance to Play-off
2	Leningradets	2	0	1	0	1	0	1	−1	2	
3	Chertanovo Moscow	2	0	0	1	1	0	4	−4	1	

Rules for classification: 1) Points; 2) Wins; 3) Goal differential; 4) Goals scored; 5) Head-to-head result; 6) Disciplinary points.
(Q) Qualified to the phase indicated

16 September 2020 Group Stage	Leningradets	0–1	Ufa	Roshchino
13:00 MSK (UTC+3)			Bizjak 58'	Stadium: Roshchino Arena

1 October 2020 Group Stage	Leningradets	0–0 (6–5 p)	Chertanovo Moscow	Roshchino
13:00 MSK (UTC+3)				Stadium: Roshchino Arena
	Penalties
	Polyakov (penalty missed); Vorobyov (penalty scored); Kazakov (penalty scored); Pinchuk (penalty scored); Umarov (penalty scored); Petrov (penalty scored); Kostin (penalty scored)		Tyumentsev (penalty scored); Savelyev (penalty missed); Molchanov (penalty scored); Kamyshev (penalty scored); Molteninov (penalty scored); Pershin (penalty scored); Kondakov (penalty missed)

21 October 2020 Group Stage	Chertanovo Moscow	0–4	Ufa	Moscow
19:00 MSK (UTC+3)			Zhamaletdinov 9'; Sysuyev 58'; Krotov 69'; Andrić 78'	Stadium: Sportivniy Gorodok Luzhniki

=== Group 5 ===
Pos	Team	Pld	W	PW	PL	L	GF	GA	GD	Pts	Final result
1	Khimki (Q)	2	1	1	0	0	2	1	+1	5	Advance to Play-off
2	Nizhny Novgorod	2	0	1	1	0	1	1	0	3	
3	Zenit Irkutsk	2	0	0	1	1	0	1	−1	1	

Rules for classification: 1) Points; 2) Wins; 3) Goal differential; 4) Goals scored; 5) Head-to-head result; 6) Disciplinary points.
(Q) Qualified to the phase indicated

15 September 2020 Group Stage	Zenit Irkutsk	0–1	Khimki	Irkutsk
13:00 MSK (UTC+3)			Konaté 64'	Stadium: Trud Stadium

30 September 2020 Group Stage	Zenit Irkutsk	0–0 (3–4 p)	Nizhny Novgorod	Irkutsk
13:00 MSK (UTC+3)				Stadium: Trud Stadium
	Penalties
	Nasadyuk (penalty scored); Bondarenko (penalty scored); Selemenev (penalty scored); Ponomarenko (penalty missed); Gaidukov (penalty missed)		Popov (penalty scored); Gashchenkov (penalty scored); Suleymanov (penalty scored); Zuykov (penalty scored); Osinov (penalty missed)

21 October 2020 Group Stage	Nizhny Novgorod	1–1 (9–10 p)	Khimki	Nizhny Novgorod
16:00 MSK (UTC+3)	Stavpets 51'		Konaté 74'	Stadium: Nizhny Novgorod Stadium
	Penalties
	Sapeta (penalty scored); Popov (penalty missed); Suleymanov (penalty scored); Sultonov (penalty scored); Gotsuk (penalty scored); Anisimov (penalty scored); Shumskikh (penalty scored); Komolov (penalty scored); Kalinsky (penalty scored); kakkoyev (penalty scored); Temnikov (penalty missed)		Mogilevets (penalty scored); Kamyshev (penalty scored); Idowu (penalty scored); Logashov (penalty missed); Mirzov (penalty scored); Gapon (penalty scored); Konaté (penalty scored); Tikhiy (penalty scored); Kukharchuk (penalty scored); Glushakov (penalty scored); Khomich (penalty scored)

=== Group 6 ===
Pos	Team	Pld	W	PW	PL	L	GF	GA	GD	Pts	Final result
1	Akhmat Grozny (Q)	2	1	1	0	0	4	1	+3	5	Advance to Play-off
2	Znamya Noginsk	2	1	0	0	1	3	3	0	3	
3	Shinnik Yaroslavl	2	0	0	1	1	1	4	−3	1	

Rules for classification: 1) Points; 2) Wins; 3) Goal differential; 4) Goals scored; 5) Head-to-head result; 6) Disciplinary points.
(Q) Qualified to the phase indicated

17 September 2020 Group Stage	Znamya Noginsk	0–3	Akhmat Grozny	Noginsk
15:00 MSK (UTC+3)			Shvets 16', 39'; Ivanov 90'	Stadium: Znamya Stadium

1 October 2020 Group Stage	Znamya Noginsk	3–0 Awarded	Shinnik Yaroslavl	Noginsk
15:00 MSK (UTC+3)				Stadium: Znamya Stadium

21 October 2020 Group Stage	Shinnik Yaroslavl	1–1 (3–4 p)	Akhmat Grozny	Yaroslavl
18:30 MSK (UTC+3)	Evseev 90+2'		Alsultanov 54'	Stadium: Shinnik Stadium
	Penalties
	Pukhov (penalty scored); Betyuzhnov (penalty scored); Golub (penalty missed); Maslennikov (penalty scored); Zinkov (penalty missed)		Kharin (penalty scored); Wilker Ángel (penalty missed); Shvets (penalty scored); Alsultanov (penalty scored); Karmayev (penalty scored)

=== Group 7 ===
Pos	Team	Pld	W	D	L	GF	GA	GD	Pts	Qualification
1	Krylia Sovetov Samara (Q)	2	2	0	0	7	1	+6	6	Advance to Play-off
2	Dynamo Stavropol	2	1	0	1	4	4	0	3	
3	Rotor Volgograd	2	0	0	2	0	6	−6	0	

(Q) Qualified for the phase indicated

23 September 2020 Group Stage	Dynamo Stavropol	3–0 Awarded	Rotor Volgograd	Stavropol
19:00 MSK (UTC+3)				Stadium: Dynamo Stadium

30 September 2020 Group Stage	Dynamo Stavropol	1–4	Krylia Sovetov Samara	Stavropol
19:00 MSK (UTC+3)	Tsarukyan 51'		Bozhin 36'; Tsypchenko 48'; Zinkovsky 89'; Sarveli 90+3'	Stadium: Dynamo Stadium

21 October 2020 Group Stage	Krylia Sovetov Samara	3–0	Rotor Volgograd	Samara
18:00 MSK (UTC+3)	Kombarov 33'; Tsypchenko 44'; Golenkov 79'			Stadium: Samara Arena

=== Group 8 ===
Pos	Team	Pld	W	PW	PL	L	GF	GA	GD	Pts	Final result
1	Sochi (Q)	2	1	1	0	0	2	1	+1	5	Advance to Play-off
2	Orenburg	2	1	0	1	0	4	1	+3	4	
3	Zvezda Perm	2	0	0	0	2	0	4	−4	0	

Rules for classification: 1) Points; 2) Wins; 3) Goal differential; 4) Goals scored; 5) Head-to-head result; 6) Disciplinary points.
(Q) Qualified to the phase indicated

16 September 2020 Group Stage	Zvezda Perm	0–1	Sochi	Perm
17:00 MSK (UTC+3)			Yusupov 20'	Stadium: Zvezda Stadium

30 September 2020 Group Stage	Zvezda Perm	0–3 Awarded	Orenburg	Perm
17:00 MSK (UTC+3)				Stadium: Zvezda Stadium

21 October 2020 Group Stage	Orenburg	1–1 (2–4 p)	Sochi	Orenburg
17:00 MSK (UTC+3)	Arty. Yusupov 18'		Dugandžić 30' (pen.)	Stadium: Gazovik Stadium
	Penalties
	Arty. Yusupov (penalty missed); Prudnikov (penalty missed); Mironov (penalty scored); Kozlov (penalty scored)		Zabolotny (penalty scored); Miladinović (penalty scored); Artu. Yusupov (penalty scored); Margasov (penalty scored)

=== Group 9 ===
Pos	Team	Pld	W	D	L	GF	GA	GD	Pts	Qualification
1	SKA-Khabarovsk (Q)	2	2	0	0	4	1	+3	6	Advance to Play-off
2	Rubin Kazan	2	1	0	1	4	3	+1	3	
3	Chernomorets Novorossiysk	2	0	0	2	3	7	−4	0	

(Q) Qualified for the phase indicated

16 September 2020 Group Stage	Chernomorets Novorossiysk	2–4	Rubin Kazan	Novorossiysk
19:00 MSK (UTC+3)	Omarov 7'; Matyushenko 69'		Ignatyev 25'; Hwang In-beom 52'; Makarov 62', 89'	Stadium: Central stadium

30 September 2020 Group Stage	Chernomorets Novorossiysk	1–3	SKA-Khabarovsk	Novorossiysk
19:00 MSK (UTC+3)	Akhmedkhanov 52' (pen.)		Barkov 13'; Bolshakov 25'; Gadzhimuradov 45'	Stadium: Central stadium

4 November 2020 Group Stage	SKA-Khabarovsk	1–0	Rubin Kazan	Khabarovsk
09:00 MSK (UTC+3)	Gadzhimuradov 75'			Stadium: Lenin Stadium

=== Group 10 ===
Pos	Team	Pld	W	D	L	GF	GA	GD	Pts	Qualification
1	Tambov (Q)	2	2	0	0	4	1	+3	6	Advance to Play-off
2	Mashuk-KMV Pyatigorsk	2	1	0	1	2	2	0	3	
3	Dynamo Bryansk	2	0	0	2	0	3	−3	0	

(Q) Qualified for the phase indicated

16 September 2020 Group Stage	Mashuk-KMV Pyatigorsk	1–2	Tambov	Pyatigorsk
16:00 MSK (UTC+3)	Krendelev 90+3' (pen.)		Onugkha 22'; Panchenko 81'	Stadium: Central stadium

30 September 2020 Group Stage	Mashuk-KMV Pyatigorsk	1–0	Dynamo Bryansk	Pyatigorsk
16:00 MSK (UTC+3)	Dulayev 75'			Stadium: Central stadium

21 October 2020 Group Stage	Dynamo Bryansk	0–2	Tambov	Bryansk
16:00 MSK (UTC+3)			Onugkha 11'; Shakhov 85'	Stadium: Dynamo Stadium

== Round of 16 ==
The match Ufa vs. Ural Yekaterinburg, originally scheduled for 22 February 2021, was postponed to 3 March 2021 one day before the match due to temperatures of −20 °C (−4 °F).

20 February 2021 Round of 16	Zenit Saint Petersburg	1–2	Arsenal Tula	Saint Petersburg
17:00 MSK (UTC+3)	Kuzyayev 19'	Report	Panchenko 25'; Bauer 37' (pen.)	Stadium: Gazprom Arena; Attendance: 18,463; Referee: Stanislav Vasilyev

20 February 2021 Round of 16	Dynamo Moscow	2–0	Spartak Moscow	Moscow
19:30 MSK (UTC+3)	Fomin 16' (pen.); Tyukavin 70'	Report		Stadium: VTB Arena; Attendance: 11,322; Referee: Kirill Levnikov

21 February 2021 Round of 16	CSKA Moscow	2–0	SKA-Khabarovsk	Moscow
14:30 MSK (UTC+3)	Akhmetov 39'; Vlašić 66'	Report		Stadium: VEB Arena; Attendance: 4,341; Referee: Vasily Kazartsev

21 February 2021 Round of 16	Lokomotiv Moscow	3–0	Tambov	Moscow
17:00 MSK (UTC+3)	Pablo 27'; Kamano 58'; Krychowiak 82' (pen.)	Report		Stadium: RZD Arena; Attendance: 3,178; Referee: Vladislav Bezborodov

21 February 2021 Round of 16	Krasnodar	1–2	Sochi	Krasnodar
17:00 MSK (UTC+3)	Vilhena 81'	Report	Zabolotny 52'; Joãozinho 67'	Stadium: Krasnodar Stadium; Attendance: 7,896; Referee: Evgeny Kukulyak

21 February 2021 Round of 16	Rostov	0–1	Akhmat Grozny	Rostov-on-Don
19:30 MSK (UTC+3)		Report	Berisha 19' (pen.)	Stadium: Rostov Arena; Attendance: 10,054; Referee: Igor Panin

22 February 2021 Round of 16	Khimki	0–4	Krylia Sovetov Samara	Khimki
14:30 MSK (UTC+3)		Report	Sergeyev 8' (pen.); Tsypchenko 62'; Golenkov 89'; Chernov 90+3'	Stadium: Arena Khimki; Attendance: 800; Referee: Mikhail Vilkov

3 March 2021 Round of 16	Ufa	3–0	Ural Yekaterinburg	Ufa
14:00 YEKT (UTC+5)	Zhamaletdinov 51', 67'; Andrić 58' (pen.)	Report		Stadium: Neftyanik Stadium; Attendance: 1,672; Referee: Pavel Shadykhanov

== Quarter-finals ==
7 April 2021 Quarter-final	Akhmat Grozny	1–0	Ufa	Grozny
19:00 MSK (UTC+3)	Kharin 55'	Report		Stadium: Akhmat Arena; Attendance: 14,876; Referee: Evgeny Kukulyak

7 April 2021 Quarter-final	Sochi	1–3	Lokomotiv Moscow	Sochi
19:00 MSK (UTC+3)	Yusupov 70'	Report	Smolov 44', 63'; Kamano 90+6'	Stadium: Fisht Olympic Stadium; Attendance: 8,487; Referee: Vasily Kazartsev

8 April 2021 Quarter-final	Krylia Sovetov Samara	2–0	Dynamo Moscow	Samara
18:30 SAMT (UTC+4)	Yezhov 5'; Sergeyev 72'	Report		Stadium: Samara Arena; Attendance: 12,762; Referee: Artyom Lyubimov

8 April 2021 Quarter-final	Arsenal Tula	1–2	CSKA Moscow	Tula
19:30 MSK (UTC+3)	Lutsenko 33'	Report	Karpov 48'; Fernandes 86'	Stadium: Arsenal Stadium; Attendance: 9,123; Referee: Mikhail Vilkov

== Semi-finals ==
21 April 2021 Semi-final	Akhmat Grozny	0–0 (1–4 p)	Krylia Sovetov Samara	Grozny
16:00 MSK (UTC+3)		Report		Stadium: Akhmat Arena; Attendance: 23,573; Referee: Vladimir Moskalyov
	Penalties
	Putsko (penalty scored); Iancu (penalty missed); Berisha (penalty missed)		Sergeyev (penalty scored); Alves (penalty scored); Golenkov (penalty scored); D. Kombarov (penalty scored)

21 April 2021 Semi-final	Lokomotiv Moscow	3–0	CSKA Moscow	Moscow
19:00 MSK (UTC+3)	Kamano 16'; Smolov 54'; Krychowiak 90+1'	Report		Stadium: RZD Arena; Attendance: 11,017; Referee: Sergei Karasev

== Final ==
12 May 2021
20:00 MSK

Lokomotiv Moscow	3–1	Krylia Sovetov Samara
Kamano 14'; Smolov 48' (pen.); Murilo 84'	Report	Sarveli 23'

Nizhny Novgorod Stadium, Nizhny Novgorod
Attendance: 20,800
Referee: Sergey Ivanov (Rostov-on-Don)
