= 2019–20 Russian Cup =

Tournament details
- Country: Russia
- Teams: 97

Final positions
- Champions: Zenit Saint Petersburg (4th title)
- Runners-up: Khimki

Tournament statistics
- Matches played: 95
- Goals scored: 296 (3.12 per match)
- All statistics correct as of 24 June 2020.

The 2019–20 Russian Cup was the 28th season of the Russian football knockout tournament since the dissolution of the Soviet Union.

The competition started 19 July 2019, but suspended on 17 March 2020 due to the COVID-19 pandemic in Russia.

Lokomotiv Moscow was the reigning cup-holder, winning its eighth Russian Cup in 2018–19, defeating Ural Yekaterinburg in the final, 1–0. However, Lokomotiv was eliminated in the round of 32 after it was defeated by Baltika Kaliningrad (1–1 after extra time and 1–4 by penalty shootout).

Lokomotiv Moscow has the most Russian Cup championships in history, followed by CSKA Moscow (7), Spartak Moscow and Zenit Saint Petersburg (3 each).

== First round ==
West-Center

20 July 2019 First round	FC Strogino Moscow	2–3	FC Rodina Moscow	Moscow
16:00 MSK (UTC+3)	Pogorelov 54'; Gleb Rodionov 56'	Report	Sandrik Apozyan 28', 86'; Nikita Reshetnyak 68' (o.g.)	Stadium: Yantar Stadium

20 July 2019 First round	FC Kvant Obninsk	3–4	FSC Dolgoprudny	Obninsk
18:30 MSK (UTC+3)	Nikolai Abramov 29', 39'; Ilya Radkov 47'	Report	Maksim Chikanchi 53'; Sabitov 59'; Islam Yevloyev 75'; Pakhomov 88'	Stadium: Stadion Trud

Center-West

20 July 2019 First round	Olimp Khimki	2–3	FC Ararat Moscow	Moscow
17:00 MSK (UTC+3)	Dulayev 46'; Alkhazov 83' (pen.)	Report	Morgunov 36'; Dzhikiya 52'; Logua 58' (pen.)	Stadium: Oktyabr Stadium

21 July 2019 First round	FC Kolomna	2–1	FC Saturn Ramenskoye	Kolomna
17:00 MSK (UTC+3)	Vyacheslav Zhuravlyov 13'; Dmitri Novak 29'	Report	Korzh 5'	Stadium: Trud Stadium

South

20 July 2019 First round	Legion Dynamo Makhachkala	3–0	FC Makhachkala	Makhachkala
16:00 MSK (UTC+3)	Mokhammad 44'; Kamil Ibragimov 45+2'; Rashid Magomedov 85'	Report		Stadium: Dynamo Stadium

20 July 2019 First round	Vaynakh Shali	1–3	Alania Vladikavkaz	Shali
16:30 MSK (UTC+3)	Usmanov 60'	Report	Zaur Tsakoyev 7'; Gurtsiyev 32'; Maloyan 64'	Stadium: Moldi Khatuev Stadium

20 July 2019 First round	Inter Cherkessk	4–2	Dynamo Stavropol	Lermontov
19:00 MSK (UTC+3)	Kuchiyev 52'; Stolbovoy 60'; Vladimir Yatsuk 74' (o.g.); Rasul Bostanov 84'	Report	Khaliullin 81'; Grigoryan 89'	Stadium: Stadion Beshtau

20 July 2019 First round	Kuban Kholding Pavlovskaya	2–0	SKA Rostov-on-Don	Pavlovskaya
18:00 MSK (UTC+3)	Vagidov 66'; Zaikin 79'	Report		Stadium: Urozhay Stadium

20 July 2019 First round	Urozhay Krasnodar	1–3	Druzhba Maykop	Krasnodar
18:00 MSK (UTC+3)	Shulgin 48'	Report	Kadimov 3'; Rizvan Akhmedkhanov 22', 56'	Stadium: Kuban Stadium

Ural

20 July 2019 First round	Lada-Tolyatti	1–3	Akron-Tolyatti	Tolyatti
15:00 MSK (UTC+3)	Stanislav Stroganov 48' (pen.)	Report	Daniil Melikhov 3', 87'; Malakhovskiy 45+1'	Stadium: Torpedo Stadium

20 July 2019 First round	Khimik-August Vurnary	2–0	Lada Dimitrovgrad	Vurnary
16:00 MSK (UTC+3)	Burmakov 16'; Aleksei Karnaukhov 59' (o.g.)	Report		Stadium: Stadion Khimik Avgust

== Second round ==
West-Center

28 July 2019 Second round	FSC Dolgoprudny	0–4	FC Zorky Krasnogorsk	Dolgoprudny
14:00		Report	Anton Danilyuk 52'; Georgievskiy 56'; Nikita Kashayev 86'; Roman Drozdov 90+3'	Stadium: Salyut Stadium

28 July 2019 Second round	Krasnyy-SGAFKST Smolensk	5–0	FC Zvezda Saint Petersburg	Smolensk
16:00	Meshkovskiy 31', 66'; Pavel Vishnevsky 55' (o.g.); Ilya Fyodorov 67'; Kirill Pomelnikov 79'	Report		Stadium: Stadion SGAFKST

28 July 2019 Second round	FC Pskov-747	0–1	FC Luch Vladivostok	Pskov
16:00		Report	Reshetnikov 36' (pen.)	Stadium: Sport Complex 747

28 July 2019 Second round	FC Rodina Moscow	0–2	FC Veles Moscow	Moscow
16:00		Report	Golub 38'; Nikita Dubchak 90'	Stadium: Stadion Yantar

28 July 2019 Second round	FC Ryazan	3–0	FC Znamya Truda Orekhovo-Zuyevo	Ryazan
16:00	Georgi Zhuravlyov 33'; Sergei Zaytsev 43'; Artyom Malakhov 62'	Report		Stadium: Central Sport Complex

28 July 2019 Second round	Electron Velikiy Novgorod	0–1	FC Leningradets Leningrad Oblast	Velikiy Novgorod
18:00		Report	Daniil Luchin 26'	Stadium: Elektron

Center-West

28 July 2019 Second Round	FC Ararat Moscow	1–0	FC Kolomna	Moscow
14:00	Dmitriyev 3'	Report		Stadium: Spartakovets imeni N.P. Starostina

28 July 2019 Second Round	FC Salyut Belgorod	3–2	FC Metallurg Lipetsk	Belgorod
16:00	Molteninov 35', 56' (pen.); Ageyev 48'	Report	Arustamyan 14'; Chernyshov 41'	Stadium: Energomash Stadium

28 July 2019 Second Round	FC Dynamo Bryansk	0–1	FC Kaluga	Bryansk
17:00		Report	Dubrovin 80'	Stadium: Dynamo Stadium

28 July 2019 Second Round	FC Torpedo Vladimir	0–1	FC Murom	Vladimir
18:00		Report	Artyom Yezhov 50'	Stadium: Torpedo Stadium

South

27 July 2019 Second Round	FC Spartak Vladikavkaz	2–2 (a.e.t.) (3–4 p)	PFC Spartak Nalchik	Vladikavkaz
15:00	Gatikoev 28'; Georgi Dzukayev 90+2'	Report	Murad Ashuyev 11'; Shavayev 66' (pen.)	Stadium: Republican Spartak Stadium
	Penalties
	Gatikoev (penalty scored); Georgi Bazayev (penalty scored); Azat Zakayev (penalty scored); Georgi Dzukayev (penalty missed); Alborov (penalty missed)		Artur Olmezov (penalty scored); Apshatsev (penalty scored); Shavayev (penalty missed); Kantemir Batsev (penalty scored); Aslan Ashinov (penalty scored)

28 July 2019 Second Round	FC Mashuk-KMV Pyatigorsk	0–1	FC Inter Cherkessk	Pyatigorsk
16:00		Report	Stukanov 67'	Stadium: Central Stadium

28 July 2019 Second Round	Alania Vladikavkaz	1–0	FC Anzhi Makhachkala	Vladikavkaz
17:00	Kachmazov 81'	Report		Stadium: Republican Spartak Stadium

28 July 2019 Second Round	FC Biolog-Novokubansk	3–1	Kuban Holding Pavlovskaya	Progress
17:00	Aleksandr Ivashin 10' (pen.); Yevgeni Kasyanov 28'; Vladislav Semyonov 53'	Report	Vagidov 55'	Stadium: Biolog Stadium

28 July 2019 Second Round	FC Volgar Astrakhan	3–0	Legion Dynamo Makhachkala	Astrakhan
18:00	Babayev 22'; Stepanov 31'; Bolonin 89'	Report		Stadium: Central Stadium

28 July 2019 Second Round	FC Druzhba Maykop	0–1 (a.e.t.)	FC Chernomorets Novorossiysk	Maykop
18:30		Report	Nikita Panamaryov 118'	Stadium: Adygeyskiy Respublikanskiy Stadium

Ural

28 July 2019 Second Round	FC Volga Ulyanovsk	6–1	Khimik-August Vurnary	Ulyanovsk
13:00	Denis Rakhmanov 12', 30'; Latsuzbaya 24', 33'; Voronin 44'; Aleksei Tsygantsov 54'	Report	Artyom Bychkov 58'	Stadium: Stadion Start

28 July 2019 Second Round	FC Chelyabinsk	0–1 (a.e.t.)	FC Tyumen	Chelyabinsk
15:00		Report	Gazdanov 120+1'	Stadium: Central Stadium

28 July 2019 Second Round	FC Zvezda Perm	6–0	FC Zenit-Izhevsk	Perm
15:00	Nikita Goldobin 23', 30'; Yevgeni Paramonov 33'; Vladislav Shustov 60'; Sekretov 83'; Rinat Guseynov 87'	Report		Stadium: Zvezda Stadium

28 July 2019 Second Round	FC Magnitogorsk	1–3	FC Nosta Novotroitsk	Magnitogorsk
15:00	Ilya Malyshev 65'	Report	Artyom Yarkin 53'; Daniil Feoktistov 61'; Donskov 78'	Stadium: Central Stadium

28 July 2019 Second Round	Delin Izhevsk	0–4	FC KAMAZ Naberezhnye Chelny	Izhevsk
16:00		Report	Yakovlev 24', 85'; Stefanovich 31', 65'	Stadium: Central Zenit Stadium

28 July 2019 Second Round	FC Akron Tolyatti	3–1	FC Sokol Saratov	Zhigulyovsk
17:00	Titov 57'; Roman Khalilullov 68', 80'	Report	Nikolay Makarov 55'	Stadium: Cristall Stadium

East

28 July 2019 Second Round	FC Dynamo Barnaul	2–1 (a.e.t.)	FC Novosibirsk	Barnaul
14:30	Zavyalov 90+'; Nesterenko 90+'	Report	Krapukhin 90+'	Stadium: Dynamo Stadium

== Third round ==
West-Center

5 August 2019 Third Round	FC Zorky Krasnogorsk	1–3	FC Ryazan	Krasnogorsk
17:00	Orlov 75'	Report	Meshcheryakov 14'; Zhuravlev 17', 68'	Stadium: Zorky Stadium

5 August 2019 Third Round	FC Veles Moscow	2–1	Krasnyy-SGAFKST Smolensk	Moscow
17:00	Bayev 52'; Dubchak 55'	Report	Meshkovskiy 82'	Stadium: Spartakovets Stadium

5 August 2019 Third Round	FC Luch Vladivostok	1–1 (4–5 p)	FC Leningradets Leningrad Oblast	Velikiye Luki
18:30	Oslonovsky 28'	Report	Kazakov 78'	Stadium: Ekspress Stadium
	Penalties
	Chubukin (penalty scored); Dikov (penalty scored); Podkovyrov (penalty scored); Alekseyev (penalty scored); Doronin (penalty missed); Belov (penalty missed)		Kostin (penalty scored); Pinchuk (penalty missed); Polyakov (penalty scored); Astafyev (penalty scored); Shikov (penalty scored); Blyndu (penalty scored)

Center-West

5 August 2019 Third Round	FC Kaluga	3–3 (a.e.t.) (4–5 p)	FC Salyut Belgorod	Kaluga
18:30	Maskaev 15'; Novitsky 45'; Volgin 59'	Report	Ageev 36'; Dyogtev 46'; Mironenko 61'	Stadium: Arena Annenki
	Penalties
	Zherdev (penalty scored); Dubrovin (penalty scored); Avagimyan (penalty missed); Maskaev (penalty scored); Aleksandr Fomin (penalty scored); Novitsky (penalty missed)		Dyogtev (penalty scored); Denisov (penalty missed); Basov (penalty scored); Chunikhin (penalty scored); Butyrin (penalty scored); Ivanteev (penalty scored)

5 August 2019 Third Round	FC Murom	2–3	FC Ararat Moscow	Murom
19:00	Kosarev 21'; Kireev 23'	Report	Dzhikiya 1', 25'; Logua 84'	Stadium: Park 50 Stadium

South

5 August 2019 Third Round	Alania Vladikavkaz	4–1	FC Volgar Astrakhan	Vladikavkaz
16:00	Magomedov 11'; Khadartsev 35' (pen.); Mashukov 37'; Kobesov 48'	Report	Myazin 51'	Stadium: Republican Spartak Stadium

5 August 2019 Third Round	PFC Spartak Nalchik	0–1	FC Inter Cherkessk	Nalchik
17:00		Report	Stolbovoy 25' (pen.)	Stadium: Spartak Stadium

5 August 2019 Third Round	FC Chernomorets Novorossiysk	4–2 (a.e.t.)	FC Biolog-Novokubansk	Novorossiysk
18:30	Dibirgadzhiyev 44', 86', 92'; Chabanov 120'	Report	Solodarenko 14'; Dmitrienko 22'	Stadium: Central Stadium

Ural

4 August 2019 Third Round	FC KAMAZ Naberezhnye Chelny	2–2 (a.e.t.) (6–5 p)	FC Zvezda Perm	Naberezhnye Chelny
16:00	Glagoyev 69' (pen.); Stefanovich 88'	Report	Yevgeni Sitnikov 22'; Tyukalov 90+1'	Stadium: KAMAZ Stadium
	Penalties
	Stefanovich (penalty scored); Ushakov (penalty missed); Glagoyev (penalty scored); Karayev (penalty scored); Kirillov (penalty scored); Chushyalov (penalty scored); Bocharov (penalty scored)		Tyukalov (penalty scored); Lauk (penalty scored); Nikita Goldobin (penalty missed); Nasedkin (penalty scored); Rinat Guseynov (penalty scored); Yevgeni Sitnikov (penalty scored); Vladislav Shustov (penalty missed)

4 August 2019 Third Round	FC Nosta Novotroitsk	0–1	FC Tyumen	Novotroitsk
16:00		Report	Gazdanov 34'	Stadium: Metallurg Stadium

4 August 2019 Third Round	FC Akron Tolyatti	3–0	FC Volga Ulyanovsk	Syzran
17:00	Titov 25'; Malakhovskiy 57'; Daniil Melikhov 79'	Report		Stadium: Kristall Stadium

East

28 July 2019 Third Round	FC Zenit Irkutsk	0–2 (a.e.t.)	FC Chita	Irkutsk
13:00		Report	Stanislav Pavlov 106'; Vladimir Markov 117'	Stadium: Zenit Stadium

9 August 2019 Third Round	FC Irtysh Omsk	3–0	FC Dynamo Barnaul	Omsk
16:00	Razborov 12', 76'; Leshonok 42'	Report		Stadium: Krytyj futbolnyj Manesh MU SK Krasnaya zvezda

10 August 2019 Third Round	FC Blagoveshchensk	0–2	FC Sakhalin Yuzhno-Sakhalinsk	Blagoveshchensk
12:00		Report	Esikov 28'; Ilya Drozdov 49'	Stadium: Spartak Stadium

== Fourth round ==
21 August 2019 Fourth round	FC Chita	0–1	FC Luch Vladivostok	Chita
12:00		Report	Belunov 12'	Stadium: Lokomotiv Stadium

21 August 2019 Fourth round	Alania Vladikavkaz	2–1	FC Rotor Volgograd	Vladikavkaz
16:00	Khadartsev 27' (pen.); Magomedov 67'	Report	Mullin 24'	Stadium: Republican Spartak Stadium

21 August 2019 Fourth round	FC Ararat Moscow	0–3	FC Nizhny Novgorod	Kolomna
17:00		Report	Sergeyev 16'; Salugin 18'; Ignatovich 81'	Stadium: Trud Stadium

21 August 2019 Fourth round	FC Akron Tolyatti	1–1 (a.e.t.) (3–5 p)	FC Mordovia Saransk	Zhigulyovsk
18:00	Titov 54'	Report	Sergeyev 89'	Stadium: Kristall Stadium

21 August 2019 Fourth round	FC Chernomorets Novorossiysk	3–0	FC Armavir	Novorossiysk
18:00	Shabivhev 31'; Klochkov 56'; Dibirgadzhiev 90+2'	Report		Stadium: Central Stadium

21 August 2019 Fourth round	FC Inter Cherkessk	2–5	FC Chayka Peschanokopskoye	Lermontov
18:00	Stolbovoy 41'; Abidokov 80'	Report	Belous 6', 43', 51'; Khokhlachev 30'; Podbeltsev 82'	Stadium: Beshtau Stadium

21 August 2019 Fourth round	FC Veles Moscow	3–3 (a.e.t.) (5–6 p)	FC Torpedo Moscow	Moscow
18:00	Sadov 32'; Baev 52'; Solovyov 112'	Report	Shorkin 29'; Bozhin 90+6'; Eliseev 109'	Stadium: Spartakovets imeni N.P. Starostina

21 August 2019 Fourth round	FC KAMAZ Naberezhnye Chelny	2–0	FC Neftekhimik Nizhnekamsk	Naberezhnye Chelny
18:30	Gagloyev 50' (pen.); Krivoruchko 90+5'	Report		Stadium: KAMAZ Stadium

21 August 2019 Fourth round	FC Leningradets Leningrad Oblast	1–2	FC Baltika Kaliningrad	Sankt Petersburg
18:30	Kortsov 54'	Report	Kisil 23', 52'	Stadium: Nova Arena Stadium

21 August 2019 Fourth round	FC Ryazan	1–4	FC Chertanovo Moscow	Ryazan
18:30	Malakhov 58'	Report	Tsypchenko 24'; Prudnikov 41', 71', 80'	Stadium: Spartak Stadium

21 August 2019 Fourth round	FC Salyut Belgorod	1–3	FC Fakel Voronezh	Belgorod
18:30	Molteninov 12' (pen.)	Report	Yakovlev 21'; Mazurov 80'; Vorobyov 90+1'	Stadium: Energomash Stadium

21 August 2019 Fourth round	FC Shinnik Yaroslavl	1–0	FC Tekstilshchik Ivanovo	Yaroslavl
18:30	Nizamutdinov 33'	Report		Stadium: Shinnik Stadium

21 August 2019 Fourth round	FC Khimki	4–1	FC Avangard Kursk	Khimki
19:00	Dyadyun 3', 7', 74'; Mishukov 16'	Report	Zemskov 15'

3 September 2019 Fourth round	FC Tyumen	0–1	FC Yenisey Krasnoyarsk	Tyumen
04:00		Report	Lomakin 82'	Stadium: Geolog Stadium

3 September 2019 Fourth round	FC Irtysh Omsk	0–2	FC Tom Tomsk	Omsk
09:00		Report	Gorbatyuk 31'; Tlupov 60'	Stadium: Krytyj futbolnyj Manesh MU SK Krasnaya zvezda

3 September 2019 Fourth round	FC Sakhalin Yuzhno-Sakhalinsk	0–2	FC SKA-Khabarovsk	Yuzhno-Sakhalinsk
10:00		Report	Patrick 14' (pen.); Elmurzayev 51' (pen.)	Stadium: Kosmos Stadium

== Round of 32 ==
25 September 2019 Round of 32	SKA-Khabarovsk	2–2 (a.e.t.) (2–4 p)	Akhmat Grozny	Khabarovsk
12:00 MSK (UTC+3)	Katsaev 82' (pen.); Nižić 101' (o.g.)	Report	Berisha 76'; Mitrishev 110'	Stadium: Lenin Stadium; Attendance: 3,956; Referee: Anton Frolov
	Penalties
	Gadzhimuradov (penalty scored); Kamilov (penalty scored); Maleyev (penalty missed); Oancea (penalty missed)		Berisha (penalty scored); Gashchenkov (penalty scored); Ismael (penalty missed); Ángel (penalty scored); Roshi (penalty scored)

25 September 2019 Round of 32	Luch Vladivostok	1–0	Dynamo Moscow	Vladivostok
12:00 MSK (UTC+3)	Marushchak 20'	Report		Stadium: Dynamo Stadium; Attendance: 6,200; Referee: Anton Anopa

25 September 2019 Round of 32	Tom Tomsk	4–0	Tambov	Tomsk
15:00 MSK (UTC+3)	Tlupov 28'; Talalay 36'; Sasin 63'; Kazankov 74' (pen.)	Report		Stadium: Trud Stadium; Attendance: 2,400; Referee: Aleksei Matyunin

25 September 2019 Round of 32	Yenisey Krasnoyarsk	1–2	Zenit Saint Petersburg	Krasnoyarsk
15:30 MSK (UTC+3)	Savichev 14'	Report	Sutormin 58' (pen.); Mak 63'	Stadium: Central Stadium; Attendance: 11,783; Referee: Nikolay Voloshin

25 September 2019 Round of 32	Chayka Peschanokopskoye	0–1	Ufa	Peschanokopskoye
18:00 MSK (UTC+3)		Report	Bizjak 36'	Stadium: Chayka Central Stadium; Attendance: 1,673; Referee: Kirill Levnikov

25 September 2019 Round of 32	Alania Vladikavkaz	1–3	CSKA Moscow	Vladikavkaz
18:00 MSK (UTC+3)	Khadartsev 19' (pen.)	Report	Akhmetov 2' (pen.); Nishimura 34', 72'	Stadium: Republican Spartak Stadium; Attendance: 18,000; Referee: Igor Panin

25 September 2019 Round of 32	Shinnik Yaroslavl	0–0 (a.e.t.) (5–4 p)	Sochi	Yaroslavl
18:30 MSK (UTC+3)		Report		Stadium: Shinnik Stadium; Attendance: 2,850; Referee: Pavel Shadyhanov
	Penalties
	Nizamutdinov (penalty scored); Viznovich (penalty missed); Shcherbakov (penalty scored); Kozhemyakin (penalty scored); Pukhov (penalty scored); Oleynikov (penalty scored)		Zabolotny (penalty scored); Miladinović (penalty scored); Lagator (penalty missed); Mostovoy (penalty scored); Burmistrov (penalty scored); Poloz (penalty missed)

25 September 2019 Round of 32	KAMAZ Naberezhnye Chelny	1–2	Spartak Moscow	Naberezhnye Chelny
18:30 MSK (UTC+3)	Karayev 24' (pen.)	Report	Ponce 22', 76'	Stadium: KAMAZ Stadium; Attendance: 5,980; Referee: Evgeny Turbin

25 September 2019 Round of 32	Mordovia Saransk	0–2	Rostov	Saransk
18:30 MSK (UTC+3)		Report	Popov 51' (pen.); Saplinov 57'	Stadium: Start Stadium; Attendance: 1,752; Referee: Aleksey Amelin

25 September 2019 Round of 32	Chertanovo Moscow	0–2 (a.e.t.)	Orenburg	Chertanovo
19:00 MSK (UTC+3)		Report	Fameyeh 105'; Kulishev 117'	Stadium: Arena Chertanovo; Referee: Anatoliy Zhabchenko

25 September 2019 Round of 32	Khimki	3–0	Rubin Kazan	Khimki
19:00 MSK (UTC+3)	Koryan 9' (pen.); Kukharchuk 47'; Gapon 85'	Report		Stadium: Rodina Stadium; Attendance: 2,600; Referee: Pavel Kukuyan

25 September 2019 Round of 32	Nizhny Novgorod	1–0	Krasnodar	Nizhny Novgorod
19:00 MSK (UTC+3)	Stavpets 78'	Report		Stadium: Nizhny Novgorod Stadium; Attendance: 17,870; Referee: Ivan Sidenkov

25 September 2019 Round of 32	Fakel Voronezh	1–2	Arsenal Tula	Voronezh
19:00 MSK (UTC+3)	Masternoy 44'	Report	Álvarez 26'; Belyayev 90'	Stadium: Tsentralnyi Profsoyuz Stadion; Attendance: 7,513; Referee: Aleksey Suhoy

25 September 2019 Round of 32	Chernomorets Novorossiysk	0–2	Ural Yekaterinburg	Novorossiysk
19:00 MSK (UTC+3)		Report	Pogrebnyak 52', 90'	Stadium: Central Stadium; Attendance: 6,000; Referee: Artyom Lyubimov

25 September 2019 Round of 32	Torpedo Moscow	2–0	Krylia Sovetov	Moscow
19:30 MSK (UTC+3)	Shorkin 36'; Sergeyev 45'	Report		Stadium: Eduard Streltsov Stadium; Attendance: 3,682; Referee: Yevgeni Kukulyak

25 September 2019 Round of 32	Baltika Kaliningrad	1–1 (a.e.t.) (4–1 p)	Lokomotiv Moscow	Kaliningrad
21:30 MSK (UTC+3)	Kazayev 74'	Report	Eder 32'	Stadium: Kaliningrad Stadium; Attendance: 17,807; Referee: Stanislav Vasilev
	Penalties
	Markin (penalty scored); Kamilov (penalty scored); Alshin (penalty scored); Glushkov (penalty scored)		Eder (penalty missed); Murilo (penalty scored); Dorofeyev (penalty missed)

== Round of 16 ==
30 October 2019 Round of 16	Ural Yekaterinburg	2–2 (a.e.t.) (5–4 p)	Arsenal Tula	Yekaterinburg
17:00 MSK (UTC+3)	Dimitrov 24'; El Kabir 37' (pen.)	Report	Kostadinov 14'; Tkachyov 34'	Stadium: Central Stadium; Attendance: 6,814; Referee: Anatoliy Zhabchenko
	Penalties
	Kulakov (penalty scored); Nasyrov (penalty missed); Augustyniak (penalty scored); Merkulov (penalty scored); Bavin (penalty scored); Haroyan (penalty scored)		(penalty scored) Bauer; (penalty scored) Álvarez; (penalty scored) Čaušić; (penalty missed) Tkachyov; (penalty scored) Lesovoy; (penalty missed) Kangwa

30 October 2019 Round of 16	Akhmat Grozny	5–1	Luch Vladivostok	Grozny
18:00 MSK (UTC+3)	Mbengue 11'; Ángel 21' (pen.); Michalak 65'; Glushakov 67', 78'	Report	Salamatov 54'	Stadium: Akhmat-Arena; Attendance: 12,418; Referee: Aleksei Matyunin

30 October 2019 Round of 16	CSKA Moscow	1–0	Ufa	Moscow
19:00 MSK (UTC+3)	Bijol 90+2'	Report		Stadium: VEB Arena; Attendance: 5,192; Referee: Sergey Ivanov

30 October 2019 Round of 16	Nizhny Novgorod	2–2 (a.e.t.) (0–3 p)	Shinnik Yaroslavl	Nizhny Novgorod
19:00 MSK (UTC+3)	Khozin 61', 90'	Report	Samoylov 32'; Ektov 35'	Stadium: Nizhny Novgorod Stadium; Attendance: 8,114; Referee: Sergei Karasev
	Penalties
	Khozin (penalty missed); Paliyenko (penalty missed); Chudin (penalty missed)		(penalty scored) Oleynikov; (penalty scored) Samodin; (penalty scored) Kozhemyakin

30 October 2019 Round of 16	Zenit Saint Petersburg	4–0	Tom Tomsk	Saint Petersburg
20:00 MSK (UTC+3)	Smolnikov 13'; Sutormin 56'; Yerokhin 67'; Shatov 81'	Report		Stadium: Krestovsky Stadium; Attendance: 38,642; Referee: Igor Panin

31 October 2019 Round of 16	Orenburg	1–2	Khimki	Orenburg
16:00 MSK (UTC+3)	Despotović 50'	Report	Polyarus 1', 21'	Stadium: Gazovik Stadium; Attendance: 2,356; Referee: Pavel Shadykhanov

31 October 2019 Round of 16	Spartak Moscow	2–1	Rostov	Moscow
19:30 MSK (UTC+3)	Larsson 43', 59'	Report	Dolgov 86'	Stadium: Otkritie Arena; Referee: Pavel Kukuyan

31 October 2019 Round of 16	Torpedo Moscow	1–0	Baltika Kaliningrad	Moscow
19:30 MSK (UTC+3)	Sergeyev 53'	Report		Stadium: Eduard Streltsov Stadium; Referee: Vasili Kazartsev

== Quarter-finals ==
4 March 2020 Quarterfinals	Akhmat Grozny	1–2 (a.e.t.)	Zenit Saint Petersburg	Grozny
18:00 MSK	Ivanov (yellow card) 56'; Roshi 59' (pen.); Ismael (yellow card) 67'; Nenakhov (yellow card) 71'; Ángel (yellow card) 86'; Ravanelli (yellow card) 114'	Report	Rigoni 78'; Zhirkov 97'	Stadium: Akhmat-Arena; Attendance: 16,411; Referee: Nikolay Voloshin

4 March 2020 Quarterfinals	Spartak Moscow	3–2 (a.e.t.)	CSKA Moscow	Moscow
19:30 MSK	Bakayev 4'; Ponce 14' (yellow card) 67' (yellow-red card) 102'; Kutepov (yellow card) 34'; Rebrov (yellow card) 103'; Larsson 107'; Zobnin (yellow card) 109'	Report	Diveyev 17'; Akhmetov 45+1'; Fernandes (yellow card) 45+3'; Oblyakov (yellow card) 80'; Karpov (yellow card) 97'; Nababkin (yellow card) 115'	Stadium: Otkritie Arena; Attendance: 39,578; Referee: Sergey Ivanov

5 March 2020 Quarterfinals	Khimki	5–1	Torpedo Moscow	Khimki
19:30 MSK	Tikhiy 27'; Martusevich (yellow card) 32'; Troshechkin 47'; Barkov 57'; Koryan 82'; Polyarus 85'; Konaté (yellow card) 89'	Report	Gordyushenko (yellow card) 23'; Rudenko (yellow card) 34'; Sergeyev 56'; Galoyan (yellow card) 58'	Stadium: Arena Khimki; Attendance: 3,500; Referee: Evgeny Kukulyak

24 June 2020 Quarterfinals	Shinnik Yaroslavl	0–2	Ural Yekaterinburg	Yaroslavl
17:00 MSK	Oleynikov (yellow card) 37' (yellow-red card) 77'; Nizamutdinov (yellow card) 39'	Report	Bavin 16' (yellow card) 35'; Augustyniak 85'	Stadium: Shinnik Stadium; Attendance: 0 Referee: Igor Panin

== Semi-finals ==
19 July 2020 Semifinals	Ural Yekaterinburg	1–3	Khimki	Yekaterinburg
13:00 MSK	Kalinin (yellow card) 10'; Yemelyanov (yellow card) 55'; Panyukov 73'	Report	Gapon 11'; Troshechkin 36'; Polyarus 37'; Dyadyun (yellow card) 60'; Tikhiy (yellow card) 65'; Koryan (yellow card) 74'; Martusevich (yellow card) 80'; Danilkin (yellow card) 85'	Stadium: Central Stadium; Attendance: 3,407; Referee: Sergey Lapochkin

19 July 2020 Semifinals	Zenit Saint Petersburg	2–1	Spartak Moscow	Saint Petersburg
18:30 MSK	Douglas Santos (yellow card) 2'; Barrios (yellow card) 17'; Dzyuba 24' (pen.); Rakitskiy (yellow card) 27'; Kuzyayev 45+3' (yellow card) 80'; Ozdoyev (yellow card) 89'	Report	Gaponov (yellow card) 24'; Sobolev (yellow card) 39' (goal) 45+1'; Ayrton (yellow card) 74'; Dzhikiya (yellow card) 80'; Gigot (yellow card) 90+1'	Stadium: Krestovsky Stadium; Attendance: 7,548; Referee: Sergey Ivanov

== Final ==
25 July 2020
19:00 YEKT

Zenit St. Petersburg	1–0	Khimki
Dzyuba 84' (pen.)	Report

Yekaterinburg Arena, Yekaterinburg
Attendance: 3,408
Referee: Vladimir Moskalyov (Voronezh)
