= Pichugin =

Pichugin (Russian: Пичугин, from пичуга meaning little bird) is a Russian masculine surname, its feminine counterpart is Pichugina. It may refer to

- Alexey Pichugin (born 1962), former security official at the Russian oil company Yukos
- Maksim Pichugin (skier) (1974–2025), Russian cross-country skier
- Maksim Pichugin (footballer) (born 1998), Russian football player
- Sergey Pichugin (footballer) (born 1976), Russian football player
- Serhiy Pichuhin (born 1961), Ukrainian sailor
- Pichugin, Pyotr Mikhailovich (1763-04.07.1848), Lieutenant General of Russian Imperial Army from 22.08.1826, obtained rights of hereditary nobility and personal coat of arms (coat of arms of the Pichugins granted on 15 March 1810)
- Pichugin, Aristarkh Petrovich (? - 13.11.1855), Major General
- Pichugin, Vsevolod Petrovich, Major General
- Pichigin, Nicholai Aristarkhovich (11.04.1843 - 25.05.1917) Major General since 09.04.1900, Lieutenant General
- Pichugin, Parmen Petrovich, Major General
- Pichugin, Pyotr Vsevolodovich, graduated from the Imperial School of Law, St. Petersburg, class X (13.05.1853) collegiate counsellor

During World War II more than 980 persons of this surname fought for the Soviet Army , including:

- Pichugin Dmitri Nikolaevich (1904–1947), Hero of the Soviet Union
- Pichugin, Ivan Yakovlevich (1913–1988), Hero of the Soviet Union
- Pichugin, Ivan Pavlovich (1901–1944), Major General
- Pichugin, Nikolai Andreevich (1898–1981), Lieutenant General
- Pichugin, Nikolai Aleksandrovich (1913–1995), Order for Courage (1945), Order for Patriotic War (1985)
