= Nikita Valenza =

Russian footballer

Personal information
- Full name: Nikita Valentinovich Valenza
- Date of birth: 21 April 1997 (age 29)
- Place of birth: Angarsk, Russia
- Height: 1.79 m (5 ft 10 1/2 in)
- Position: Defender

Senior career*
Years	Team	Apps	(Gls)
2013–2014	Viktor Ponedelnik Academy Rostov-on-Don		
2014	FC Angara-ANKhK Angarsk		
2015	FC Baikal-M Irkutsk		
2016	FC Baikal Irkutsk	10	(0)
- * Club domestic league appearances and goals

Nikita Valentinovich Valenza (Russian: Никита Валентинович Валенза; born 21 April 1997) is a Russian former football player.

He made his debut in the Russian Football National League for FC Baikal Irkutsk on 27 March 2016 in a game against FC SKA-Energiya Khabarovsk.
