= Zherdev (surname) =

Zherdev, Zherdeva is a Russian surname Russian: Жердев, where 'Жердь' means 'perch'. Notable people with the surname include:

- Andrei Zherdev (born 1989), Russian footballer
- Gleb Zherdev (born 2000), Belarusian footballer
- Nikolay Zherdev (born 1984), Ukrainian-Russian ice hockey player
