= Dyshekov =

Dyshekov (masculine, Russian: Дышеков) or Dyshekova (feminine, Russian: Дышековa) is a Russian surname. Notable people with the surname include:

- Aslan Dyshekov (born 1987), Russian soccer player of Kabardin-Balkar descent
- Khazret Dyshekov (born 1965), Russian soccer player and coach of Kabardin-Balkar descent
- Kuna Dyshekova, Russian actress of Kabardin descent
