= Sergey Pichugin =

Sergey Pichugin may refer to:

- Sergey Pichugin (footballer) (born 1976), Russian footballer
- Serhiy Pichuhin (born 1961), Olympic sailor who represented the Unified Team and Ukraine
