= Maksim Pichugin =

Maksim Pichugin may refer to:

- Maksim Pichugin (footballer) (born 1998), Russian football player
- Maksim Pichugin (skier) (1974–2025), Russian Olympic skier
