= Vadim Lazarev =

Russian footballer

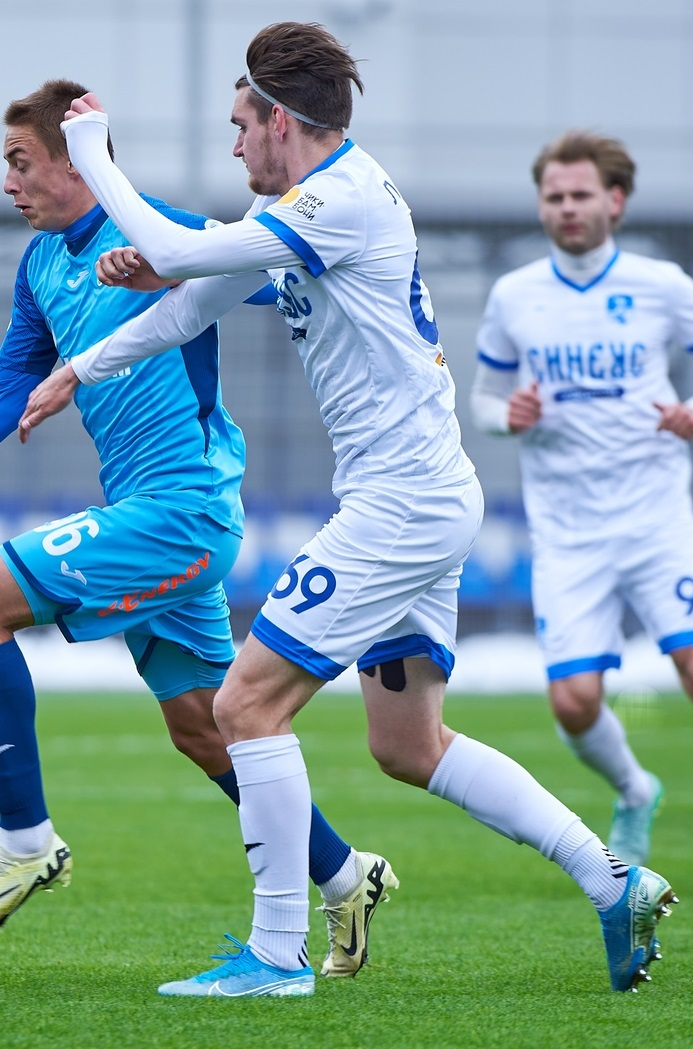
- Lazarev with Dynamo Vologda in 2024

Personal information
- Full name: Vadim Vladimirovich Lazarev
- Date of birth: 4 February 2000 (age 26)
- Place of birth: Krasny Sulin, Rostov Oblast, Russia
- Height: 1.87 m (6 ft 2 in)
- Position: Defender

Team information
- Current team: FC Kyzyltash Bakhchisaray
- Number: 4

Youth career
- –2012: DYuSSh Gukovo
- 2012–2014: FC Akademiya Futbola Rostov-on-Don
- 2014–2015: FC Krasnodar
- 2015: FC Dynamo Moscow
- 2015–2018: PFC CSKA Moscow
- 2018–2019: FC Rostov

Senior career*
Years	Team	Apps	(Gls)
2019–2021	FC Chayka Peschanokopskoye	2	(0)
2019	→ FC Inter Cherkessk (loan)	14	(0)
2020–2021	→ FC Rodina Moscow (loan)	10	(0)
2021	FC Olimp-Dolgoprudny-2	15	(0)
2022	Nakhichevan-on-Don Rostov-on-Don (amateur)		
2022	FC Kolomna	20	(0)
2023	FC Znamya Truda Orekhovo-Zuyevo	8	(0)
2023	FC Dynamo Kirov	7	(0)
2024	FC Dynamo Vologda	16	(0)
2025	FC Ryazan	21	(0)
2026–	FC Kyzyltash Bakhchisaray	10	(0)
- * Club domestic league appearances and goals as of 31 October 2026

Vadim Vladimirovich Lazarev (Russian: Вадим Владимирович Лазарев; born 4 February 2000) is a Russian football player who plays for FC Kyzyltash Bakhchisaray.

== Club career ==
He played for PFC CSKA Moscow in the 2017–18 UEFA Youth League.

He made his debut in the Russian Football National League for FC Chayka Peschanokopskoye on 7 July 2019 in a game against FC Chertanovo Moscow.
