= Andrei Mamatyuk =

Russian footballer

Personal information
- Full name: Andrei Vladimirovich Mamatyuk
- Date of birth: 13 April 1991 (age 35)
- Place of birth: Staraya Russa, Novgorod Oblast, Russian SFSR
- Height: 1.75 m (5 ft 9 in)
- Position: Midfielder

Youth career
- 2007–2008: Spartak Moscow

Senior career*
Years	Team	Apps	(Gls)
2009–2010	Spartak Moscow	0	(0)
2009	→ Jakobstad (loan)	10	(4)
2010	→ Gazovik Orenburg (loan)	11	(0)
2010	Volga Nizhny Novgorod	0	(0)
2011–2012	Tyumen	29	(6)
2012	Slavia Mozyr	6	(0)
2013	Dynamo Saint Petersburg	13	(0)
2014	Zvezda Ryazan	10	(1)
2014–2016	Zenit Penza	52	(13)
2016–2017	Torpedo Vladimir	24	(4)
2017–2022	Kyzyltash Bakhchisaray	109	(13)
- * Club domestic league appearances and goals

Andrei Vladimirovich Mamatyuk (Russian: Андрей Владимирович Маматюк; born 13 April 1991) is a Russian former professional football player.

== Club career ==
He made his Russian Football National League debut for FC Dynamo Saint Petersburg on 12 August 2013 in a game against FC Shinnik Yaroslavl.
