= Magomet =

- Gender: Male
- Language: Russian

Origin
- Meaning: Praiseworthy

Other names
- Derived: Muḥammad, مُحَمَّد, from Ḥammada, "Praise", حَمَّدَ
- Related names: Muhammad

Magomet (Russian: Магомет) is the Russian form of the Arabic name Muhammad meaning "praiseworthy".

== People ==
- Magomet Gadzhiyev (1907–1942), Soviet naval commander
- Magomet Isayev (1928–2011), Russian translator and linguist
- Magomet Mamakaev (1910–1973), Chechen poet
- Magomet Shavayev (born 1995), Russian footballer
