= Artiom Zabun =

Moldovan footballer (born 1996)

Personal information
- Date of birth: 23 April 1996 (age 30)
- Place of birth: Etulia, Moldova
- Height: 1.78 m (5 ft 10 in)
- Position: Forward

Team information
- Current team: Kyzyltash Bakhchisaray
- Number: 10

Youth career
- 2008–2013: Sheriff Tiraspol

Senior career*
| Years | Team | Apps | (Gls) |
| 2013–2015 | Sheriff-2 Tiraspol | 43 | (19) |
| 2014–2016 | Sheriff Tiraspol | 1 | (0) |
| 2016 | → Saxan (loan) | 7 | (0) |
| 2016 | → Victoria Chișinău (loan) | 12 | (21) |
| 2017 | Krumkachy Minsk | 8 | (0) |
| 2017 | → Sfîntul Gheorghe (loan) | 8 | (0) |
| 2018 | Sabah | 13 | (3) |
| 2018 | Victoria Chișinău | 9 | (11) |
| 2019 | Codru Lozova | 8 | (0) |
| 2019–2020 | ASU Politehnica | 12 | (1) |
| 2020 | → Focșani (loan) | 1 | (0) |
| 2020 | Savelovskaya Moscow | 3 | (0) |
| 2021–2026 | TSK Simferopol | 87 | (56) |
| 2026– | Kyzyltash Bakhchisaray | 26 | (4) |

International career^{‡}
| 2011–2012 | Moldova U17 (Note: Only official UEFA matches included) | 5 | (0) |
| 2017 | Moldova | 1 | (0) |
- * Club domestic league appearances and goals as of 31 October 2026 ‡ National team caps and goals as of 17 January 2017

Artiom Zabun (born 23 April 1996) is a Moldovan footballer who plays as a forward for Russian Second League club Kyzyltash Bakhchisaray.
