= Ivan Donskov =

Russian footballer (born 1997)

Personal information
- Full name: Ivan Vyacheslavovich Donskov
- Date of birth: 17 October 1997 (age 29)
- Place of birth: Rostov-on-Don, Russia
- Height: 1.87 m (6 ft 2 in)
- Position: Forward

Senior career*
Years	Team	Apps	(Gls)
2014–2015	FC Akademiya Futbola Rostov-on-Don (amateur)		
2016	FC Rodina Millerovo		
2017–2019	FC Akademiya Futbola Rostov-on-Don	42	(5)
2019–2020	FC Nosta Novotroitsk	27	(5)
2020	FC Irtysh Omsk	7	(0)
2021	FC SKA Rostov-on-Don	16	(3)
2021	FC Irtysh Omsk	16	(12)
2022	FC Chayka Peschanokopskoye	8	(0)
2022	FC Novosibirsk	4	(1)
- * Club domestic league appearances and goals

Ivan Vyacheslavovich Donskov (Russian: Иван Вячеславович Донсков; born 17 October 1997) is a Russian former football player.

== Club career ==
He made his debut in the Russian Football National League for FC Irtysh Omsk on 1 August 2020 in a game against FC Yenisey Krasnoyarsk, he substituted Kirill Morozov in the 53rd minute.
