= Nikita Belunov =

Russian footballer (born 1999)

Personal information
- Full name: Nikita Vladimirovich Belunov
- Date of birth: 13 November 1999 (age 26)
- Place of birth: Vladivostok, Russia
- Height: 1.72 m (5 ft 8 in)
- Position: Midfielder

Senior career*
Years	Team	Apps	(Gls)
2018–2020	FC Luch Vladivostok	10	(0)
2020–2021	FC Smolensk	23	(3)
2021–2022	FC Dynamo Vladivostok	10	(1)
- * Club domestic league appearances and goals as of 10 June 2022

Nikita Vladimirovich Belunov (Russian: Никита Владимирович Белунов; born 13 November 1999) is a Russian football player.

== Club career ==
He made his debut in the Russian Football National League for FC Luch Vladivostok on 3 March 2019 in a game against FC Krasnodar-2, as a 72nd-minute substitute for Andrei Chasovskikh.
