= Aleksei Shulgin (footballer) =

Russian footballer

Personal information
- Full name: Aleksei Borisovich Shulgin
- Date of birth: 2 June 1997 (age 29)
- Place of birth: Volgograd, Russia
- Height: 1.74 m (5 ft 9 in)
- Position: Forward

Youth career
- KOR Rodimtseva Volgograd

Senior career*
Years	Team	Apps	(Gls)
2016	FC Rotor-Volgograd-VKOR Volgograd		
2017	FC Afips-2 Afipsky		
2018	FC Progress Timashyovsk		
2018	FC Kolos Beloglinsky Raion		
2019	FC Kuban Krasnodar (amateur)		
2019–2021	FC Kuban Krasnodar	54	(17)
2022	FC Novosibirsk	0	(0)
2022	FC Balashikha	9	(0)
2023	FC Kuban-Holding Pavlovskaya	8	(1)
2023–2025	FC Spartak Tambov	66	(8)
- * Club domestic league appearances and goals as of 1 November 2025

Aleksei Borisovich Shulgin (Russian: Алексей Борисович Шульгин; born 2 June 1997) is a Russian football player.

== Club career ==
He made his debut in the Russian Football National League for FC Kuban Krasnodar on 10 July 2021 in a game against FC Torpedo Moscow.
