= Maksim Shorkin =

Russian footballer

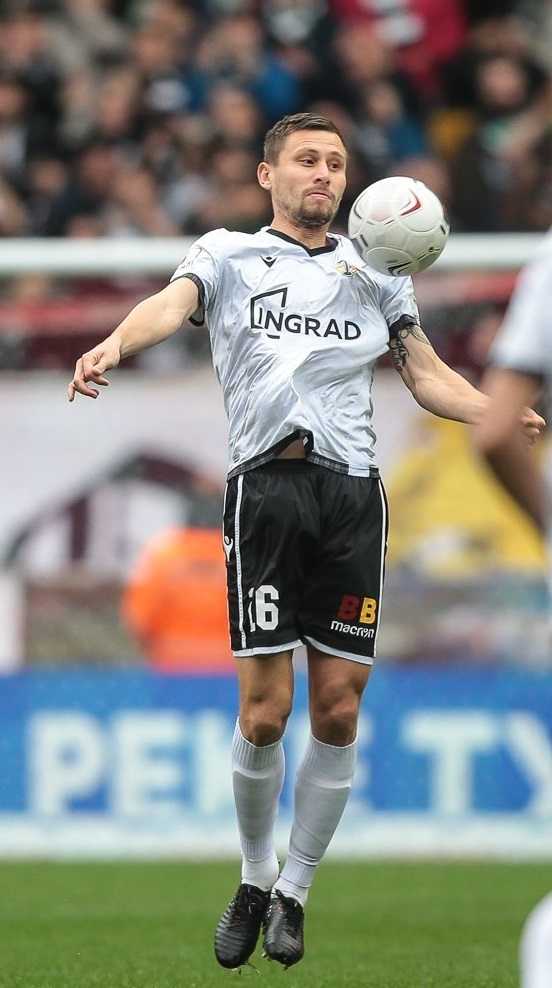
- Shorkin with Torpedo Moscow in 2019

Personal information
- Full name: Maksim Viktorovich Shorkin
- Date of birth: 3 September 1990 (age 36)
- Place of birth: Cheboksary, Russian SFSR
- Height: 1.88 m (6 ft 2 in)
- Position: Defender

Youth career
- FC Krylia Cheboksary
- FC KAMAZ Naberezhnye Chelny

Senior career*
Years	Team	Apps	(Gls)
2010–2012	FC KAMAZ Naberezhnye Chelny	21	(1)
2013–2014	FC Tyumen	0	(0)
2013	→ FC Lokomotiv Liski (loan)	10	(0)
2013–2014	→ FC Volga Ulyanovsk (loan)	8	(1)
2015	FC Burily Kugesi (indoor)		
2015–2016	FC Kafa Feodosia (KFS)	24	(3)
2016–2017	FC Torpedo Moscow	22	(0)
2017–2018	FC Mordovia Saransk	22	(0)
2018–2021	FC Torpedo Moscow	85	(6)
2021–2026	FC Neftekhimik Nizhnekamsk	97	(7)
- * Club domestic league appearances and goals as of 16 May 2026

Maksim Viktorovich Shorkin (Russian: Максим Викторович Шоркин; born 3 September 1990) is a Russian former professional football player.

== Club career ==
He made his debut in the Russian Football National League for FC KAMAZ Naberezhnye Chelny on 26 March 2012 in a game against FC Baltika Kaliningrad.
