= Aleksandr Morgunov =

Russian footballer

Personal information
- Full name: Aleksandr Andreyevich Morgunov
- Date of birth: 4 June 1995 (age 31)
- Place of birth: Proletarsk, Russia
- Height: 1.75 m (5 ft 9 in)
- Position: Midfielder

Team information
- Current team: Kyzyltash Bakhchisaray
- Number: 14

Senior career*
| Years | Team | Apps | (Gls) |
| 2012 | Akademiya Tolyatti | 19 | (2) |
| 2013–2015 | Dynamo Moscow | 0 | (0) |
| 2016–2018 | Krasnodar | 0 | (0) |
| 2016 | → Krasnodar-2 | 9 | (0) |
| 2017 | → Milsami Orhei (loan) | 8 | (0) |
| 2017–2018 | → Krasnodar-2 | 18 | (7) |
| 2018 | → Afips Afipsky (loan) | 12 | (2) |
| 2018–2019 | Khimki | 16 | (0) |
| 2018–2019 | → Khimki-M | 8 | (2) |
| 2019 | Ararat Moscow | 16 | (2) |
| 2020–2022 | Forte Taganrog | 52 | (3) |
| 2022–2023 | Saturn Ramenskoye | 30 | (8) |
| 2023–2024 | Biolog-Novokubansk | 28 | (2) |
| 2024–2025 | Sevastopol | 21 | (0) |
| 2025 | Anapa (amateur) | | |
| 2026 | PSK Dinskaya | 0 | (0) |
| 2026– | Kyzyltash Bakhchisaray | 10 | (3) |

International career
| 2013 | Russia U-18 | 10 | (2) |
| 2013–2014 | Russia U-19 | 10 | (4) |
| 2014–2015 | Russia U-21 | 13 | (2) |
- * Club domestic league appearances and goals as of 31 October 2026

Aleksandr Andreyevich Morgunov (Russian: Александр Андреевич Моргунов; born 4 June 1995) is a Russian football central midfielder who plays for Kyzyltash Bakhchisaray.

== Club career ==
He made his debut in the Russian Second Division for Akademiya Tolyatti on 18 May 2012 in a game against Syzran-2003.

He made his debut for the main squad of Krasnodar in the Russian Cup game against Spartak Nalchik on 21 September 2016.

He made his Russian Football National League debut for Khimki on 17 July 2018 in a game against Luch Vladivostok.
