= Ilya Gruznov =

Russian footballer

Personal information
- Full name: Ilya Aleksandrovich Gruznov
- Date of birth: 5 February 1997 (age 29)
- Place of birth: Yelanka, Russia
- Height: 1.88 m (6 ft 2 in)
- Position: Forward

Team information
- Current team: FC Khimik Dzerzhinsk
- Number: 36

Youth career
- FC Yelanka
- 2012: FC Feniks Yelan-Kolenovsky
- 2013: FC Yelan-Khopyor Yelan-Koleno

Senior career*
| Years | Team | Apps | (Gls) |
| 2014 | FC Lokomotiv Liski | 1 | (0) |
| 2015 | FC Fakel-M Voronezh (amateur) | | |
| 2015–2016 | FC Lokomotiv Liski | 0 | (0) |
| 2016 | FC Fakel-M Voronezh (amateur) | | |
| 2017–2018 | FC Atom Novovoronezh (amateur) | | |
| 2018–2019 | FC Kolomna | 16 | (3) |
| 2019 | FC Mashuk-KMV Pyatigorsk | 11 | (5) |
| 2019–2020 | FC Ararat Moscow | 17 | (10) |
| 2020–2021 | FC Kuban Krasnodar | 22 | (9) |
| 2021 | FC Fakel Voronezh | 5 | (0) |
| 2021 | FC Fakel-M Voronezh | 12 | (1) |
| 2022–2023 | Shinnik Yaroslavl | 34 | (11) |
| 2023 | FC Neftekhimik Nizhnekamsk | 6 | (0) |
| 2023–2024 | FC Kuban Krasnodar | 22 | (4) |
| 2024–2025 | FC Chelyabinsk | 29 | (5) |
| 2025– | FC Khimik Dzerzhinsk | 39 | (26) |
- * Club domestic league appearances and goals as of 1 November 2026

Ilya Aleksandrovich Gruznov (Russian: Илья Александрович Грузнов; born 5 February 1997) is a Russian football player who plays for FC Khimik Dzerzhinsk.

== Club career ==
He made his debut in the Russian Football National League for FC Fakel Voronezh on 10 July 2021 in a game against FC Baltika Kaliningrad.
