= FC Kyzyltash Bakhchisaray =

Kyzyltash Bakhchisaray
- Full name: Professional'nyy futbol'nyy klub Kyzyltash Bakhchisaray
- Founded: 2016
- Ground: Lokomotiv Republican Sports Complex, Simferopol
- Capacity: 19,978
- Manager: Hennadiy Orbu
- League: Russian Second League Division B Group 1
- 2026: 6th
- Website: kzt.com.ru

PFC Kyzyltash Bakhchisaray (Russian: ПФК «Кызылташ» Бахчисарай) is an association football team based in Bakhchisaray, Crimea that plays in the Russian Second League Division B.

== Club history ==
It was founded in 2016 in Yalta, where it remained one season. Positioned as the first Crimean Tatar football club. The unofficial anthem of the club is the national melody Yalyboyskaya Khaitarma.

For the 2026 season, Kyzyltash was licensed for the fourth-tier Russian Second League Division B. It was assigned to Group 1.

== Team names ==
- 2016–2017: PFC Kyzyltash Yalta
- 2017–present: PFC Kyzyltash Bakhchisaray

== Current squad ==
As of 11 September 2026, according to the Second League website.

Note: Flags indicate national team as defined under FIFA eligibility rules; some limited exceptions apply. Players may hold more than one non-FIFA nationality.

No.	Pos.	Nation	Player
2	MF	UKR	Yevhen Suinov
4	DF	RUS	Vadim Lazarev
7	MF	UKR	Redvan Memeshev
8	MF	RUS	Ruslan Margiyev
9	MF	UKR	Danylo Zavadko
10	FW	MDA	Artiom Zabun
11	FW	UKR	Emir Lutfiyev
14	MF	RUS	Aleksandr Morgunov
15	DF	RUS	Viktor Zavyalov
17	DF	RUS	Timur Gabuyev
18	MF	UKR	Hryhoriy Fedotov
19	DF	RUS	Vadim Petrenko
20	DF	UKR	Artem Lavreka
22	MF	RUS	Aleksandr Obolentsev

No.	Pos.	Nation	Player
23	DF	UKR	Remzi Ramazanov
27	MF	RUS	Ruslan Volguzov
33	DF	UKR	Rizvan Ablitarov
34	GK	RUS	Nikita Repin
35	GK	RUS	Sergey Zhigaylov
41	DF	RUS	Igor Maslennikov
55	MF	UKR	Denys Sytnykov
70	MF	RUS	Yegor Yelesin
71	MF	RUS	Soslan Kabisov
75	DF	RUS	Dmitry Chameyev
77	MF	RUS	Danila Lukinykh
88	MF	RUS	Asad Asadov
99	FW	RUS	Daniil Antonenko

== League and cup history (Crimea) ==
Season	Div.	Pos.	Pl.	W	D	L	GS	GA	P	Domestic Cup	Europe	Notes
2016–17	2nd Open Championship	3_{/13}	23	15	1	7	51	34	46	1/8 finals		Promoted
2017–18	1st Premier League	5_{/8}	28	9	5	14	39	46	32	1/4 finals		
2018–19	1st Premier League	6_{/8}	28	9	7	12	33	38	34	1/4 finals		
2019–20	1st Premier League	5_{/8}	28	9	7	12	49	44	34	1/4 finals		
2020–21	1st Premier League	7_{/8}	28	8	7	13	36	47	31	1/2 finals		1st–2nd league match (winner)
2021–22	1st Premier League											
