= Maksim Sidorov (footballer, born 1991) =

Russian footballer

Personal information
- Full name: Maksim Mikhailovich Sidorov
- Date of birth: 11 October 1991 (age 35)
- Place of birth: Pereslavl-Zalessky, Russia
- Height: 1.69 m (5 ft 7 in)
- Position: Midfielder

Senior career*
Years	Team	Apps	(Gls)
2011–2015	FC Shinnik-M Yaroslavl		
2015–2018	FC Spartak Kostroma	77	(19)
2018–2022	FC Tekstilshchik Ivanovo	84	(8)
- * Club domestic league appearances and goals

Maksim Mikhailovich Sidorov (Russian: Максим Михайлович Сидоров; born 11 October 1991) is a Russian former football player.

== Club career ==
He made his debut in the Russian Professional Football League for FC Spartak Kostroma on 20 July 2015 in a game against FC Domodedovo Moscow, scoring a goal on his debut in his team's 2-0 victory.

He made his Russian Football National League debut for FC Tekstilshchik Ivanovo on 7 July 2019 in a game against FC Yenisey Krasnoyarsk.
