= Artur Arustamyan =

Russian football player

Personal information
- Full name: Artur Garikovich Arustamyan
- Date of birth: 28 May 1997 (age 29)
- Place of birth: Voronezh, Russia
- Height: 1.75 m (5 ft 9 in)
- Position: Forward

Youth career
- FC Fakel Voronezh

Senior career*
Years	Team	Apps	(Gls)
2017–2019	FC Fakel Voronezh	26	(0)
2019–2022	FC Metallurg Lipetsk	76	(13)
2022	FC Yenisey Krasnoyarsk	7	(0)
2023	FC KAMAZ Naberezhnye Chelny	14	(1)
2023–2024	FC Metallurg Lipetsk	29	(4)
2024–2026	FC Veles Moscow	25	(1)
- * Club domestic league appearances and goals as of 13 June 2026

Artur Garikovich Arustamyan (Russian: Артур Гарикович Арустамян; born 28 May 1997) is an Armenian Russian football player.

== Club career ==
He made his debut in the Russian Football National League for FC Fakel Voronezh on 12 March 2017 in a game against FC Khimki.
