= Valeri Tsarukyan =

Russian footballer (born 2001)

Personal information
- Full name: Valeri Armenovich Tsarukyan
- Date of birth: 12 November 2001 (age 25)
- Place of birth: Novaya Derevnya, Kochubeyevsky District, Stavropol Krai, Russia
- Height: 1.70 m (5 ft 7 in)
- Position: Midfielder

Team information
- Current team: Nizhny Novgorod
- Number: 80

Youth career
- 2007–: Dynamo Stavropol
- –2013: DYuSSh Kozhanyi Myach R. Pavlyuchenko Stavropol
- 2013–2014: Krasnodar
- 2014–2018: DYuSSh Kozhanyi Myach R. Pavlyuchenko Stavropol

Senior career*
Years	Team	Apps	(Gls)
2019	Truzhenik Arkhangelskoye (amateur)		
2019–2020	Dynamo Stavropol	27	(2)
2021–2023	Fakel Voronezh	12	(0)
2021–2022	→ Fakel-M Voronezh	10	(1)
2022–2023	→ Volgar Astrakhan (loan)	30	(4)
2023	Alania Vladikavkaz	20	(1)
2024–	Nizhny Novgorod	26	(3)
2026	→ Akhmat Grozny (loan)	0	(0)
- * Club domestic league appearances and goals as of 7 December 2025

Valeri Armenovich Tsarukyan (Russian: Валерий Арменович Царукян; born 12 November 2001) is a Russian football player of Armenian descent who plays for Nizhny Novgorod.

== Club career ==
He made his debut in the Russian Football National League for Fakel Voronezh on 17 April 2021 in a game against Krylia Sovetov Samara.

On 9 June 2022, Tsarukyan was loaned to Volgar Astrakhan.

On 30 June 2023, Tsarukyan signed a contract with Alania Vladikavkaz for the term of three years, with an optional fourth year.

On 21 January 2024, Tsarukyan moved to the Russian Premier League club Pari Nizhny Novgorod on a three-and-a-half-year contract. He made his RPL debut for Pari NN on 3 March 2024 against Fakel Voronezh.

On 10 February 2026, Tsarukyan was loaned by Akhmat Grozny, with an option to buy. He returned to Pari in June 2026.

== Career statistics ==
As of match played 7 December 2025

Appearances and goals by club, season and competition
Club	Season	League			Cup		Other		Total	
Club	Season	Division	Apps	Goals	Apps	Goals	Apps	Goals	Apps	Goals
Dynamo Stavropol	2019–20	Russian Second League	12	0	0	0	–		12	0
Dynamo Stavropol	2020–21	Russian Second League	15	2	3	2	–		18	4
Dynamo Stavropol	Total		27	2	3	2	0	0	30	4
Fakel Voronezh	2020–21	Russian First League	4	0	–		–		4	0
Fakel Voronezh	2021–22	Russian First League	8	0	1	0	–		9	0
Fakel Voronezh	Total		12	0	1	0	0	0	13	0
Fakel-M Voronezh	2020–21	Russian Second League	2	0	–		–		2	0
Fakel-M Voronezh	2021–22	Russian Second League	8	1	–		–		8	1
Fakel-M Voronezh	Total		10	1	0	0	0	0	10	1
Volgar Astrakhan (loan)	2022–23	Russian First League	30	4	2	0	–		32	4
Alania Vladikavkaz	2023–24	Russian First League	20	1	0	0	–		20	1
Pari Nizhny Novgorod	2023–24	Russian Premier League	4	0	–		1 (Note: Appearance in the relegation play-offs)	0	5	0
Pari Nizhny Novgorod	2024–25	Russian Premier League	18	3	6	1	2	0	26	4
Pari Nizhny Novgorod	2025–26	Russian Premier League	4	0	2	0	–		6	0
Pari Nizhny Novgorod	Total		26	3	8	1	3	0	37	4
Akhmat Grozny (loan)	2025–26	Russian Premier League	0	0	–		–		0	0
Career total			125	11	14	3	3	0	142	14
