= Ilya Molteninov =

Russian footballer

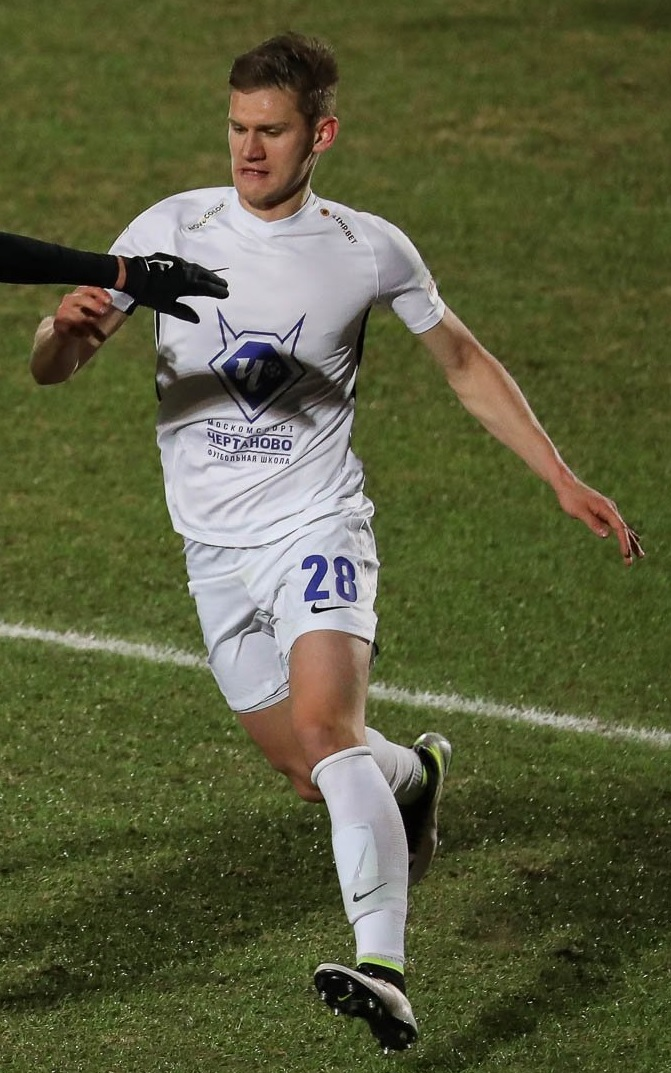
- Molteninov with Chertanovo in 2021

Personal information
- Full name: Ilya Alekseyevich Molteninov
- Date of birth: 15 December 1995 (age 30)
- Place of birth: Moscow, Russia
- Height: 1.88 m (6 ft 2 in)
- Position: Forward

Team information
- Current team: FC Saturn Ramenskoye
- Number: 28

Youth career
- 2007–2014: Chertanovo Education Center

Senior career*
Years	Team	Apps	(Gls)
2014–2015	FC Chertanovo Moscow	15	(1)
2015–2016	FC Metallurg Lipetsk	10	(0)
2016	FC Zenit Penza	5	(0)
2017	FC Veles Moscow	7	(0)
2018	FC Akademiya Futbola Rostov-on-Don	13	(0)
2018–2019	FC Salyut Belgorod	32	(9)
2020–2021	FC Chertanovo Moscow	30	(9)
2021–2022	FC Yenisey Krasnoyarsk	18	(4)
2022–2024	FC Ufa	39	(6)
2024–2025	FC Yenisey Krasnoyarsk	8	(0)
2025	→ FC Torpedo Miass (loan)	17	(2)
2025–2026	FC Kuban Krasnodar	27	(4)
2026–	FC Saturn Ramenskoye	0	(0)
- * Club domestic league appearances and goals as of 31 October 2026

Ilya Alekseyevich Molteninov (Russian: Илья Алексеевич Молтенинов; born 15 December 1995) is a Russian football player who plays for FC Saturn Ramenskoye.

== Club career ==
He made his debut in the Russian Football National League for FC Chertanovo Moscow on 8 August 2020 in a game against FC Tom Tomsk, as a starter.
