= Aleksandr Vasilyev (footballer, born 2000) =

Russian footballer

Personal information
- Full name: Aleksandr Antonovich Vasilyev
- Date of birth: 31 May 2000 (age 26)
- Place of birth: Vladivostok, Russia
- Height: 1.78 m (5 ft 10 in)
- Positions: Forward; midfielder

Senior career*
Years	Team	Apps	(Gls)
2018–2020	FC Luch Vladivostok	5	(0)
2020–2021	FC Smolensk	23	(3)
2021–2023	FC Dynamo Vladivostok	36	(6)
2024	FC Sakhalin Yuzhno-Sakhalinsk	12	(0)
- * Club domestic league appearances and goals as of 3 November 2024

Aleksandr Antonovich Vasilyev (Russian: Александр Антонович Васильев; born 31 May 2000) is a Russian football player.

== Club career ==
He made his debut in the Russian Football National League for FC Luch Vladivostok on 4 May 2019 in a game against FC Shinnik Yaroslavl.
