= Daniil Tyumentsev =

Russian footballer

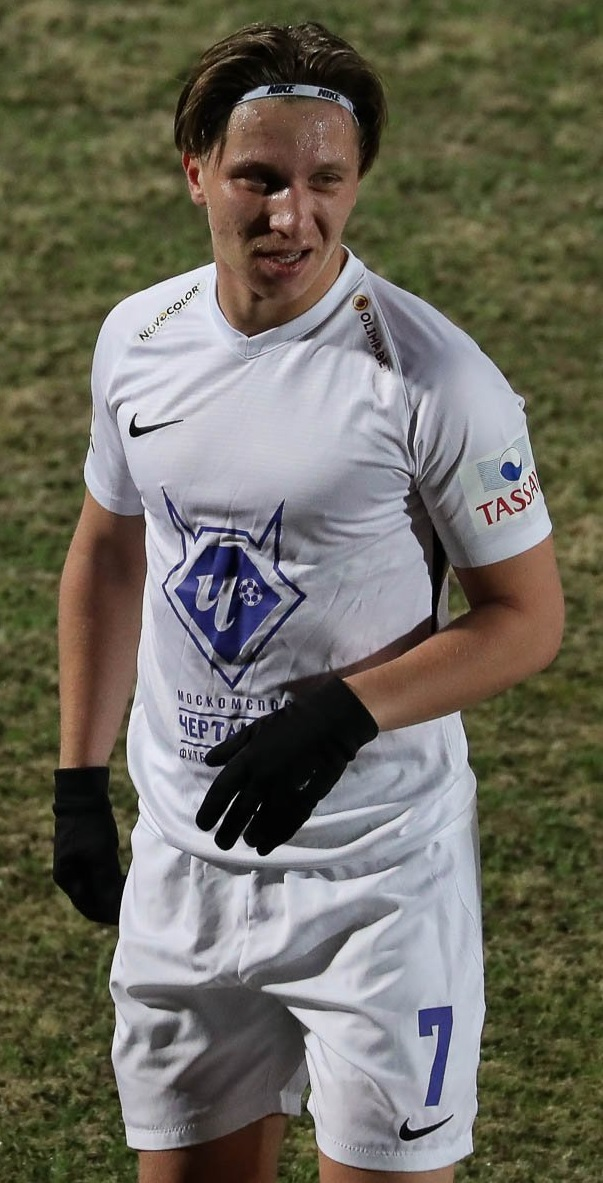
- Tyumentsev with Chertanovo in 2021

Personal information
- Full name: Daniil Sergeyevich Tyumentsev
- Date of birth: 14 February 1997 (age 29)
- Height: 1.82 m (6 ft 0 in)
- Position: Midfielder

Senior career*
Years	Team	Apps	(Gls)
2014–2023	Chertanovo Moscow	197	(20)
2018–2019	Chertanovo-2 Moscow	16	(1)
2024	Metallurg Lipetsk	14	(2)
2024	Kompozit Pavlovsky Posad	13	(5)
- * Club domestic league appearances and goals as of 3 November 2024

Daniil Sergeyevich Tyumentsev (Russian: Даниил Сергеевич Тюменцев; born 14 February 1997) is a Russian football player.

== Club career ==
Tyumentsev made his professional debut in the Russian Professional Football League for Chertanovo Moscow on 25 July 2014 in a game against Tambov. He made his Russian Football National League debut for Chertanovo on 17 July 2018 in a game against Rotor Volgograd.
