= Dmitry Pakhomov =

Russian footballer

Personal information
- Full name: Dmitry Alekseyevich Pakhomov
- Date of birth: 18 July 1994 (age 32)
- Place of birth: Moscow, Russia
- Height: 1.81 m (5 ft 11 in)
- Position: Midfielder

Team information
- Current team: FC Metallurg Lipetsk
- Number: 8

Senior career*
Years	Team	Apps	(Gls)
2011–2014	FC Sportakademklub Moscow (amateur)		
2015–2020	FSC Dolgoprudny	113	(9)
2020–2021	FC Olimp-Dolgoprudny	12	(1)
2021	FC Olimp-Dolgoprudny-2	18	(1)
2022	FC Olimp-Dolgoprudny	8	(0)
2022–2023	FC Kosmos Dolgoprudny	21	(2)
2023–	FC Metallurg Lipetsk	93	(4)
- * Club domestic league appearances and goals as of 31 October 2026

Dmitry Alekseyevich Pakhomov (Russian: Дмитрий Алексеевич Пахомов; born 18 July 1994) is a Russian football player who plays for FC Metallurg Lipetsk.

== Club career ==
He made his debut in the Russian Football National League for FC Olimp-Dolgoprudny on 6 March 2022 in a game against FC Spartak-2 Moscow.
