= Sergei Kositsin =

Russian association football player

Personal information
- Full name: Sergei Vyacheslavovich Kositsin
- Date of birth: 2 September 1995 (age 31)
- Place of birth: Krasnoyarsk, Russia
- Height: 1.84 m (6 ft 0 in)
- Positions: Defender; midfielder

Senior career*
Years	Team	Apps	(Gls)
2016	FC Yenisey Krasnoyarsk	1	(0)
2016	FC Oryol	14	(2)
2017	FC Nosta Novotroitsk	15	(1)
2018	FC Rotor Volgograd	7	(0)
2018	FC Nosta Novotroitsk	1	(0)
2018	FC Tambov	3	(0)
2019	FC Nosta Novotroitsk	4	(0)
2019–2021	FC Novosibirsk	30	(1)
2021–2022	FC Tekstilshchik Ivanovo	17	(0)
2023	FC Zenit-Izhevsk	8	(0)
2023	FC Sakhalin Yuzhno-Sakhalinsk	3	(0)
2023–2024	FC Forte Taganrog	30	(1)
2025	FC KDV Tomsk	15	(0)
- * Club domestic league appearances and goals as of 19 October 2025

Sergei Vyacheslavovich Kositsin (Russian: Сергей Вячеславович Косицин; born 2 September 1995) is a Russian football player.

== Club career ==
He made his debut in the Russian Football National League for FC Yenisey Krasnoyarsk on 2 May 2016 in a game against FC Tyumen.
