= Levan Latsuzbaya =

Russian footballer

Levani Latsuzbaya
Personal information
- Full name: Levani Sosoyevich Latsuzbaya
- Date of birth: 23 March 1988 (age 38)
- Place of birth: Yaroslavl, Russian SFSR
- Height: 1.76 m (5 ft 9 in)
- Position: Midfielder

Senior career*
Years	Team	Apps	(Gls)
2007	FC Shinnik-2-Vodokanal Yaroslavl		
2008–2011	FC Shinnik Yaroslavl	28	(0)
2011–2012	FC Petrotrest St. Petersburg	10	(0)
2013	FC Dynamo Kostroma (amateur)		
2013–2014	FC Olimpia Volgograd	13	(0)
2015	FC Kolomna	6	(0)
2015–2018	FC Spartak Kostroma	69	(11)
2018–2019	FC Dynamo Bryansk	23	(7)
2019–2021	FC Volga Ulyanovsk	26	(2)
- * Club domestic league appearances and goals

Levani Sosoyevich Latsuzbaya (Russian: Левани Сосоевич Лацузбая; born 23 March 1988) is a Russian former professional football player.

== Club career ==
He made his Russian Football National League debut for FC Shinnik Yaroslavl on 24 June 2009 in a game against FC Baltika Kaliningrad.
