= Sergei Shalin =

Russian footballer

Personal information
- Full name: Sergei Valeryevich Shalin
- Date of birth: 14 August 1990 (age 36)
- Place of birth: Vladimir, Russian SFSR
- Height: 1.83 m (6 ft 0 in)
- Position: Defender

Senior career*
Years	Team	Apps	(Gls)
2007–2012	FC Torpedo Vladimir	125	(4)
2012–2013	FC Tyumen	26	(4)
2013–2019	FC Torpedo Vladimir	156	(16)
2019–2021	FC Murom	40	(3)
- * Club domestic league appearances and goals

Sergei Valeryevich Shalin (Russian: Серге́й Валерьевич Шалин; born 14 August 1990) is a Russian former professional football player.

== Club career ==
He made his Russian Football National League debut for FC Torpedo Vladimir on 4 April 2011 in a game against FC Alania Vladikavkaz.
