= Dmitri Pikatov =

Russian footballer

Personal information
- Full name: Dmitri Andreyevich Pikatov
- Date of birth: 10 August 1996 (age 30)
- Place of birth: Bryansk, Russia
- Height: 1.76 m (5 ft 9 1/2 in)
- Position: Midfielder

Team information
- Current team: FC Dynamo Bryansk
- Number: 20

Senior career*
| Years | Team | Apps | (Gls) |
| 2014–2017 | FC Dynamo Bryansk | 49 | (2) |
| 2017 | FC Zenit Penza | 13 | (1) |
| 2018– | FC Dynamo Bryansk | 218 | (26) |
- * Club domestic league appearances and goals as of 15 November 2026

Dmitri Andreyevich Pikatov (Russian: Дмитрий Андреевич Пикатов; born 10 August 1996) is a Russian football player who plays for FC Dynamo Bryansk.

== Club career ==
He made his debut in the Russian Football National League for FC Dynamo Bryansk on 8 August 2020 in a game against FC Yenisey Krasnoyarsk, he substituted Aleksandr Kryuchkov in the 69th minute.
