= Danila Kalikhanov =

Russian footballer (born 2001)

Personal information
- Full name: Danila Alekseyevich Kalikhanov
- Date of birth: 16 February 2001 (age 25)
- Height: 1.78 m (5 ft 10 in)
- Position: Defender

Youth career
- FC Mordovia Saransk

Senior career*
Years	Team	Apps	(Gls)
2018–2020	FC Mordovia Saransk	7	(0)
2020	FC Kolomna	8	(1)
2020–2021	FC Mordovia-MCPUFP Saransk		
2021–2022	FC Saransk	23	(0)
2022	FC Irtysh Omsk	6	(0)
- * Club domestic league appearances and goals as of 6 September 2022

Danila Alekseyevich Kalikhanov (Russian: Данила Алексеевич Калиханов; born 16 February 2001) is a Russian football player.

== Club career ==
He made his debut in the Russian Football National League for FC Mordovia Saransk on 12 October 2019 in a game against FC Khimki.
