= Igor Maslennikov (footballer) =

Russian footballer

Personal information
- Full name: Igor Maksimovich Maslennikov
- Date of birth: 24 June 2001 (age 25)
- Place of birth: Yaroslavl, Russia
- Height: 1.85 m (6 ft 1 in)
- Position: Midfielder

Team information
- Current team: FC Kyzyltash Bakhchisaray
- Number: 41

Senior career*
| Years | Team | Apps | (Gls) |
| 2018–2021 | FC Shinnik Yaroslavl | 4 | (0) |
| 2022–2024 | PFC Spartak Nalchik | 73 | (6) |
| 2024 | FC Torpedo Miass | 15 | (0) |
| 2025 | SC Astrakhan | 26 | (1) |
| 2026– | FC Kyzyltash Bakhchisaray | 22 | (0) |
- * Club domestic league appearances and goals as of 31 October 2026

Igor Maksimovich Maslennikov (Russian: Игорь Максимович Масленников; born 24 June 2001) is a Russian football player who plays for FC Kyzyltash Bakhchisaray.

== Club career ==
He made his debut in the Russian Football National League for FC Shinnik Yaroslavl on 25 May 2019 in a game against FC Avangard Kursk, as a 90th-minute substitute for Vladislav Kamilov.
