= Magomet Shavayev =

Russian footballer

Personal information
- Full name: Magomet Khasanovich Shavayev
- Date of birth: 19 January 1995 (age 31)
- Place of birth: Kursk, Russia
- Height: 1.94 m (6 ft 4 1/2 in)
- Position: Midfielder

Senior career*
Years	Team	Apps	(Gls)
2013–2014	FC Avangard Kursk	1	(0)
2016–2017	PFC Spartak Nalchik	5	(0)
2018–2020	PFC Spartak Nalchik	43	(5)
- * Club domestic league appearances and goals

Magomet Khasanovich Shavayev (Russian: Магомет Хасанович Шаваев; born 19 January 1995) is a Russian former football player.

== Career ==
He made his debut in the Russian Professional Football League for FC Avangard Kursk on 22 October 2013 in a game against FC Spartak-2 Moscow. He made his Russian Football National League debut for PFC Spartak Nalchik on 13 November 2016 in a game against FC Shinnik Yaroslavl.
