= Andrei Zherdev =

Russian footballer

Personal information
- Full name: Andrei Vadimovich Zherdev
- Date of birth: 28 January 1989 (age 37)
- Place of birth: Kaluga, Russian SFSR
- Height: 1.86 m (6 ft 1 in)
- Position: Midfielder

Youth career
- Smena Kaluga

Senior career*
Years	Team	Apps	(Gls)
2006	FC Lokomotiv Kaluga	18	(0)
2007	FC Zarya Duminichi		
2008–2009	FC Nara-ShBFR Naro-Fominsk	26	(1)
2010–2012	FC Kaluga	41	(4)
2012	FC Metallurg-Oskol Stary Oskol	12	(0)
2013	FC Kvant Obninsk (amateur)		
2013–2014	FC Zimbru Chișinău	9	(0)
2014	FC Kvant Obninsk (amateur)		
2014–2015	FC Dynamo Barnaul	17	(0)
2015–2018	FC Kvant Obninsk (amateur)		
2018	FC Kvant Obninsk	16	(5)
2019–2020	FC Kaluga	31	(2)
- * Club domestic league appearances and goals

Andrei Vadimovich Zherdev (Russian: Андрей Вадимович Жердев; born 28 January 1989) is a Russian former professional football player.

== Club career ==
He played in the Moldovan National Division for FC Zimbru Chișinău in 2013.
