= Sergey Pichugin (footballer) =

Russian footballer

Personal information
- Full name: Sergey Nikolayevich Pichugin
- Date of birth: 9 March 1976 (age 50)
- Height: 1.77 m (5 ft 9 1/2 in)
- Position: Forward

Senior career*
Years	Team	Apps	(Gls)
1994–1997	Spartak-Bratskiy Yuzhny	61	(13)
1997	Chernomorets Novorossiysk	8	(1)
1998	KAMAZ-Chally Naberezhnye Chelny	7	(0)
1998	Nosta Novotroitsk	15	(3)
1999	Chernomorets Novorossiysk	0	(0)
1999	Kristall Smolensk	6	(0)
- * Club domestic league appearances and goals

Sergey Nikolayevich Pichugin (Russian: Сергей Николаевич Пичугин; born 9 March 1976) is a former Russian football player.
