= Vasili Pinchuk =

Russian footballer (born 1994)

Personal information
- Full name: Vasili Andreyevich Pinchuk
- Date of birth: 8 December 1994 (age 31)
- Place of birth: Saint Petersburg, Russia
- Height: 1.90 m (6 ft 3 in)
- Position: Defender

Youth career
- FC Zenit St. Petersburg

Senior career*
Years	Team	Apps	(Gls)
2013–2014	FC Kuban Krasnodar	0	(0)
2014–2015	FC Dynamo Saint Petersburg	13	(0)
2015	FC Tom-2 Tomsk	4	(0)
2016	FC Volgar Astrakhan	2	(0)
2017	JK Narva Trans	11	(0)
2017–2018	FSK Dolgoprudny	22	(1)
2019–2022	FC Leningradets Leningrad Oblast	55	(3)
- * Club domestic league appearances and goals

Vasili Andreyevich Pinchuk (Russian: Василий Андреевич Пинчук; born 8 December 1994) is a Russian former football player.

== Club career ==
He made his professional debut in the Russian Football National League for FC Dynamo Saint Petersburg on 19 July 2014 in a game against FC Tyumen.

He played for the main squad of FC Kuban Krasnodar in the Russian Cup.
