= Aslan Dyshekov =

Russian professional football player

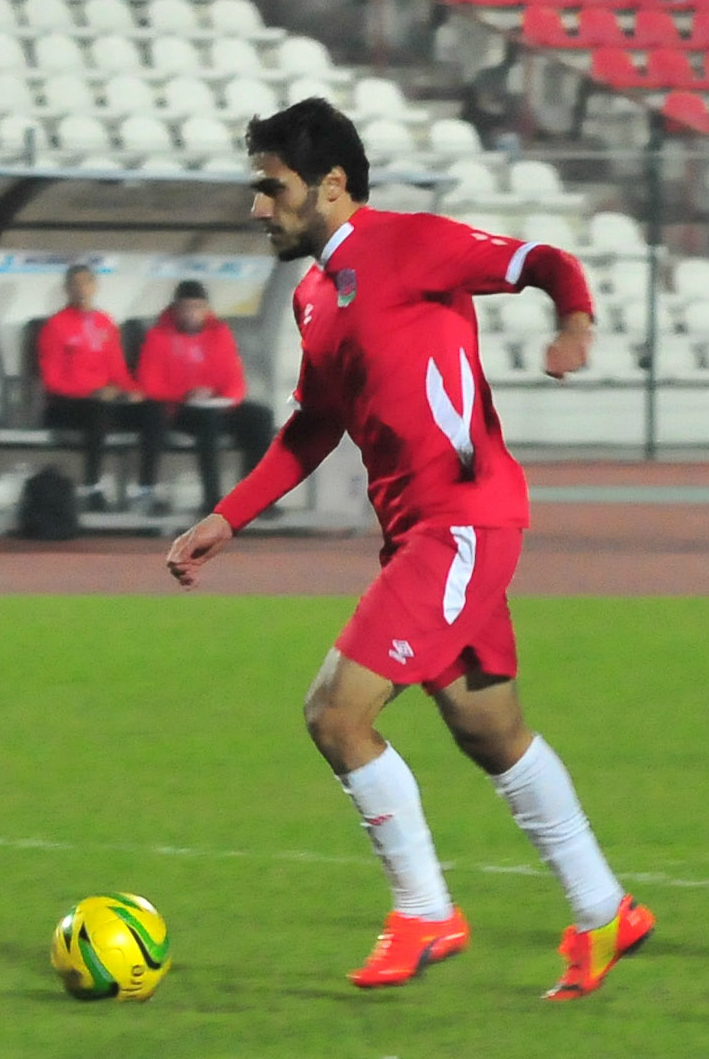

Personal information
- Full name: Aslan Ruslanovich Dyshekov
- Date of birth: 15 January 1987 (age 39)
- Place of birth: Baksan, Russian SFSR
- Height: 1.75 m (5 ft 9 in)
- Positions: Midfielder; defender

Senior career*
Years	Team	Apps	(Gls)
2006–2009	PFC Spartak Nalchik	0	(0)
2008	→ FC SKA Rostov-on-Don (loan)	15	(1)
2009	→ FC Stavropol (loan)	31	(8)
2010	FC Irtysh Omsk	20	(0)
2010	PFC Spartak Nalchik	5	(0)
2011	FC Dynamo Stavropol	11	(0)
2011	FC Mostovik-Primorye Ussuriysk	7	(0)
2012–2013	FC Kavkaztransgaz-2005 Ryzdvyany	22	(2)
2013–2014	FC Angusht Nazran	28	(1)
2014–2015	PFC Spartak Nalchik	31	(2)
2015–2016	FC Sibir Novosibirsk	35	(3)
2016–2017	FC Volgar Astrakhan	54	(1)
2018–2019	FC Armavir	30	(6)
2019–2020	FC Volgar Astrakhan	17	(0)
2020–2021	FC Kuban-Holding Pavlovskaya	29	(8)
2021–2022	FC Kuban Krasnodar	11	(1)
2022	→ FC SKA Rostov-on-Don (loan)	11	(2)
2022–2023	FC Kuban-Holding Pavlovskaya	47	(8)
2024	PFC Dynamo Stavropol	24	(5)
- * Club domestic league appearances and goals

Aslan Ruslanovich Dyshekov (Russian: Аслан Русланович Дышеков; born 15 January 1987) is a Russian former professional football player.

== Club career ==
He made his Russian Premier League debut for PFC Spartak Nalchik on 20 September 2010 in a game against FC Spartak Moscow.
