= Denis Degtev =

Russian professional football player

Personal information
- Full name: Denis Vyacheslavovich Degtev
- Date of birth: 4 February 1988 (age 38)
- Place of birth: Shebekino, Russian SFSR
- Height: 1.88 m (6 ft 2 in)
- Position: Forward

Team information
- Current team: FC Salyut Belgorod (team supervisor)
- Number: 22

Youth career
- 1995–1998: DYuSSh-3 Shebekino
- 1998–2008: Inter-Modul Stary Oskol

Senior career*
Years	Team	Apps	(Gls)
2009	FC Nezhegol Shebekino		
2010–2011	FC Metallurg-Oskol Stary Oskol	57	(11)
2012–2013	FC Salyut Belgorod	29	(1)
2014	FC Oryol	7	(0)
2014	FC Vybor-Kurbatovo Voronezh	4	(0)
2014	FC SKChF Sevastopol	15	(0)
2015–2018	FC Energomash Belgorod	56	(4)
2018–2019	FC Torpedo Moscow	24	(3)
2019–2025	FC Salyut Belgorod	146	(49)
Total		338	(68)

Managerial career
- 2023: FC Salyut Belgorod (sports director)
- 2024–: FC Salyut Belgorod (team supervisor)
- * Club domestic league appearances and goals

Denis Vyacheslavovich Degtev (Russian: Денис Вячеславович Дегтев; born 4 February 1988) is a Russian professional football official and a former player who is the team supervisor for FC Salyut Belgorod.

== Club career ==
He made his Russian Football National League debut for FC Salyut Belgorod on 16 July 2012 in a game against FC Khimki.
