= Maksim Pichugin (footballer) =

Russian footballer

Personal information
- Full name: Maksim Olegovich Pichugin
- Date of birth: 5 November 1998 (age 27)
- Place of birth: Khimki, Russia
- Height: 1.81 m (5 ft 11 in)
- Position: Forward

Team information
- Current team: FC Amkal Moscow

Youth career
- FC Khimki

Senior career*
Years	Team	Apps	(Gls)
2017–2018	FC Khimki	20	(0)
2018	→ FC Khimki-M	4	(1)
2019–2020	FC Baltika Kaliningrad	0	(0)
2019	→ FC Dynamo Bryansk (loan)	6	(0)
2020	→ FC Zorky Krasnogorsk (loan)	0	(0)
2020–2022	FC Rodina Moscow	41	(7)
2022–2023	FC Rodina-2 Moscow	12	(1)
2023	FC Rodina-M Moscow	18	(2)
2024–	FC Amkal Moscow (amateur)		
- * Club domestic league appearances and goals as of 12 November 2023

Maksim Olegovich Pichugin (Russian: Максим Олегович Пичугин; born 5 November 1998) is a Russian football player who plays for FC Amkal Moscow.

== Club career ==
He made his debut in the Russian Football National League for FC Khimki on 17 May 2017 in a game against FC Sokol Saratov.
