= FC Akademiya Futbola Rostov-on-Don =

Former football team from Russia

Akademiya Futbola Rostov-on-Don
- Full name: Football Club Akademiya Futbola Rostov-on-Don
- Founded: 2012
- Dissolved: 2019
- Owner: Ivan Savvidis
- Chairman: Aleksandr Razaryonov
- Manager: Vacant
- League: PFL, Zone South
- 2017–18: 10th

FC Akademiya Futbola Rostov-on-Don (Russian: ФК "Академия Футбола им. В. Понедельника" (Ростов-на-Дону)) was a Russian football team based in Rostov-on-Don. It was the senior team for the football academy founded in 2006 by Ivan Savvidis. The senior team participated in the Rostov Oblast amateur championship from 2012. In 2008 it was named after former USSR international Viktor Ponedelnik.

For 2017–18 season, it received the license for the third-tier Russian Professional Football League. During the winter break in the 2018–19 season, it experienced financial difficulties and dropped out of PFL.
