= 2022–23 PFC CSKA Moscow season =

PFC CSKA Moscow
2022–23 season
- President: Yevgeni Giner
- Head coach: Vladimir Fedotov
- Stadium: VEB Arena
- Premier League: 2nd
- Russian Cup: Champions
- Top goalscorer: League: Fyodor Chalov (19); All: Fyodor Chalov (24)
- Highest home attendance: 17,102 vs Spartak Moscow (16 October 2022)
- Lowest home attendance: 2,440 vs Sochi (28 September 2022)
- Average home league attendance: 9,116 (3 June 2023)
Home colours	Away colours	Third colours
- All statistics correct as of 21 March 2024.

The 2022–23 season was PFC CSKA Moscow's 112th season in existence and 30th consecutive in the Russian Premier League. They will also compete in the Russian Cup.

== Season events ==
On 20 May, CSKA announced that they had activated an option in their loan deal with Jorge Carrascal from River Plate to make the move a permanent one, with Carrascal signing a contract until the summer of 2026.

On 17 June, CSKA announced the signing of Milan Gajić from Red Star Belgrade on a contact until the summer of 2025.

On 3 July, CSKA announced that both Arnór Sigurðsson and Chidera Ejuke had exercised their rights to suspend their CSKA contracts for the season.

On 28 July, CSKA announced the signing of Saša Zdjelar from Partizan on a contact until the summer of 2025, and the signing of Víctor Méndez from Unión Española, also on a contract until the summer 2025.

On 4 August, CSKA announced the signing of Moisés on a season-long loan deal from Internacional, with the option to make the transfer permanent.

On 1 September, CSKA announced the signing of Willyan Rocha on a contract until the summer of 2025 from Portimonense.

On 5 September, Ilya Shkurin also exercised his right to suspend his CSKA contract for the season.

On 11 December, CSKA announced that Mário Fernandes had resumed his playing career and that he had joined Internacional for 2023.

On 16 December, CSKA announced that Bruno Fuchs had joined Atlético Mineiro on loan until December 2023.

On 6 January, CSKA announced the signing pot Ilya Agapov from Pari NN on a contract until the summer of 2027.

On 7 January, CSKA announced that Vladislav Yakovlev would join Pari NN on loan for the remainder of the season.

On 19 January, CSKA announced that Kristijan Bistrović had terminated his loan deal with Lecce, and that he had joined Fortuna Sittard on loan for the remainder of the season.

On 31 January, CSKA announced that Adolfo Gaich had extended his contract by six-months and that he had joined Hellas Verona on loan for the remainder of the season. On the same day, Dmitry Kaptilovich left CSKA to sign permanently for Zvezda St.Petersburg.

On 10 February, CSKA announced that they had signed their first professional contract with Yegor Noskov.

On 17 February, CSKA announced that Danila Bokov had joined Salyut Belgorod on loan for the remainder of the season.

On 17 June, Kirill Nababkin signed a new one-year contract with CSKA.

== Squad ==
As of match played 11 June 2023

Number	Name	Nationality	Position	Date of birth (age)	Signed from	Signed in	Contract ends	Apps.	Goals
Goalkeepers
35	Igor Akinfeev	(Russia)	GK	8 April 1986 (aged 37)	Academy	2003	2024	740	0
49	Vladislav Torop	(Russia)	GK	7 November 2003 (aged 19)	Academy	2019	2026	11	0
Defenders
4	Willyan Rocha	(Brazil)	DF	27 January 1995 (aged 28)	Portimonense	2022	2025	32	4
14	Kirill Nababkin	(Russia)	DF	8 September 1986 (aged 36)	Moscow	2010	2024	303	5
22	Milan Gajić	(Serbia)	DF	28 January 1996 (aged 27)	Red Star Belgrade	2022	2026	42	1
27	Moisés	(Brazil)	DF	11 March 1995 (aged 28)	on loan from Internacional	2022	2023	36	1
42	Georgi Shchennikov	(Russia)	DF	27 April 1991 (aged 32)	Academy	2008	2023	367	10
62	Vadim Karpov	(Russia)	DF	14 July 2002 (aged 20)	Academy	2019	2025	33	1
77	Ilya Agapov	(Russia)	DF	21 January 2001 (aged 22)	Pari NN	2023	2027	3	0
78	Igor Diveyev	(Russia)	DF	27 September 1999 (aged 23)	Ufa	2019	2024	133	11
90	Matvey Lukin	(Russia)	DF	27 April 2004 (aged 19)	Academy	2022		3	0
92	Yegor Noskov	(Russia)	DF	24 March 2003 (aged 20)	Academy	2022		5	0
Midfielders
5	Saša Zdjelar	(Serbia)	MF	20 March 1995 (aged 28)	Partizan	2022	2025	38	0
6	Maksim Mukhin	(Russia)	MF	4 November 2001 (aged 21)	Lokomotiv Moscow	2021	2026	53	1
8	Jorge Carrascal	(Colombia)	MF	25 May 1998 (aged 25)	River Plate	2023	2026	47	7
10	Ivan Oblyakov	(Russia)	MF	5 July 1998 (aged 24)	Ufa	2018	2023	175	17
19	Bakhtiyar Zaynutdinov	(Kazakhstan)	MF	2 April 1998 (aged 25)	Rostov	2020	2025	78	6
20	Konstantin Kuchayev	(Russia)	MF	18 March 1998 (aged 25)	Academy	2015	2024	138	12
28	Jesús Medina	(Paraguay)	MF	30 April 1997 (aged 26)	Unattached	2022	2025	45	14
53	Kirill Glebov	(Russia)	MF	10 November 2005 (aged 17)	Academy	2022		7	0
72	Nikita Yermakov	(Russia)	MF	19 January 2003 (aged 20)	Academy	2022		31	2
88	Víctor Méndez	(Chile)	MF	23 September 1999 (aged 23)	Unión Española	2022	2025	38	0
Forwards
9	Fyodor Chalov	(Russia)	FW	10 April 1998 (aged 25)	Academy	2015	2024	220	73
41	Yegor Ushakov	(Russia)	FW	2 December 2002 (aged 20)	Academy	2021	2026	13	1
91	Anton Zabolotny	(Russia)	FW	13 June 1991 (aged 31)	Sochi	2021	2024	62	10
Away on loan
1	Ilya Pomazun	(Russia)	GK	16 August 1996 (aged 26)	Academy	2012	2026	9	0
3	Bruno Fuchs	(Brazil)	DF	1 April 1999 (aged 24)	Internacional	2020	2025	19	0
11	Chidera Ejuke	(Nigeria)	FW	2 January 1998 (aged 25)	SC Heerenveen	2020	2024	65	10
12	Lassana N'Diaye	(Mali)	FW	3 October 2000 (aged 22)	Guidars	2018	2023	0	0
17	Arnór Sigurðsson	(Iceland)	MF	15 May 1999 (aged 24)	IFK Norrköping	2018	2023	87	13
21	Adolfo Gaich	(Argentina)	FW	26 February 1999 (aged 24)	San Lorenzo	2020	2025	30	3
25	Kristijan Bistrović	(Croatia)	MF	9 April 1998 (aged 25)	Slaven Belupo	2018	2025	96	8
45	Danila Bokov	(Russia)	GK	8 September 2002 (aged 20)	Academy	2021	2023	1	0
46	Vladislav Yakovlev	(Russia)	FW	14 February 2002 (aged 21)	Academy	2021	2025	34	1
59	Tigran Avanesyan	(Russia)	MF	13 April 2002 (aged 21)	Academy	2018	2026	0	0
99	Ilya Shkurin	(Belarus)	FW	17 August 1999 (aged 23)	Dynamo Brest	2020	2024	19	3
	Vadim Konyukhov	(Russia)	DF	5 January 2002 (aged 21)	Academy	2021	2025	0	0
	Sergei Pryakhin	(Russia)	MF	16 December 2002 (aged 20)	Academy	2021	2026	0	0
	Andrei Savinov	(Russia)	MF	14 May 2002 (aged 21)	Academy	2021	2025	0	0
	Mikhail Zabotkin	(Russia)	FW	17 April 2003 (aged 20)	Strogino Moscow	2021		0	0
Players who left during the season
48	Dmitry Kaptilovich	(Russia)	DF	22 February 2003 (aged 20)	Academy	2021		2	0

== Transfers ==
=== In ===
Date	Position	Nationality	Name	From	Fee	Ref.
20 May 2022	MF	(Colombia)	Jorge Carrascal	River Plate	Undisclosed	
17 June 2022	DF	(Serbia)	Milan Gajić	Red Star Belgrade	Undisclosed	
28 July 2022	MF	(Chile)	Víctor Méndez	Unión Española	Undisclosed	
28 July 2022	MF	(Serbia)	Saša Zdjelar	Partizan	Undisclosed	
1 September 2022	DF	(Brazil)	Willyan Rocha	Portimonense	Undisclosed	
6 January 2023	DF	(Russia)	Ilya Agapov	Pari NN	Undisclosed	

=== Loans in ===
Date from	Position	Nationality	Name	From	Date to	Ref.
4 August 2022	DF	(Brazil)	Moisés	Internacional	End of season	

=== Out ===
Date	Position	Nationality	Name	To	Fee	Ref.
31 January 2024	DF	(Russia)	Dmitry Kaptilovich	Zvezda St.Petersburg	Undisclosed	

=== Loans out ===
Date from	Position	Nationality	Name	To	Date to	Ref.
2023	MF	(Croatia)	Kristijan Bistrović	Lecce	19 January 2024	
16 December 2023	DF	(Brazil)	Bruno Fuchs	Atlético Mineiro	31 December 2023	
7 January 2024	FW	(Russia)	Vladislav Yakovlev	Pari NN	Undisclosed	
19 January 2024	MF	(Croatia)	Kristijan Bistrović	Fortuna Sittard	End of season	
31 January 2024	FW	(Argentina)	Adolfo Gaich	Hellas Verona	End of season	
17 February 2024	GK	(Russia)	Danila Bokov	Salyut Belgorod	11 December 2023	

=== Contract suspensions ===
Date	Position	Nationality	Name	Joined	Date	Ref.
3 July 2022	MF	(Iceland)	Arnór Sigurðsson	IFK Norrköping	30 June 2023	
3 July 2022	FW	(Nigeria)	Chidera Ejuke	Hertha BSC	30 June 2023	
5 September 2022	FW	(Belarus)	Ilya Shkurin	Maccabi Petah Tikva	30 June 2023	

=== Released ===
Date	Position	Nationality	Name	Joined	Date	Ref.
11 December 2023	DF	(Russia)	Mário Fernandes	Internacional	11 December 2023	

== Friendlies ==
	–
MSK (UTC+3)

== Competitions ==
=== Overall record ===
Competition	First match	Last match	Starting round	Final position	Record							
Competition	First match	Last match	Starting round	Final position	Pld	W	D	L	GF	GA	GD	Win %
Premier League	16 July 2022	3 June 2023	Matchday 1	2nd	30	17	7	6	56	27	+29	56.67
Russian Cup	31 August 2022	11 June 2023	Group stage	Winners	13	7	4	2	18	10	+8	53.85
Total					43	24	11	8	74	37	+37	55.81

Last updated: 11 June 2023
Source: Soccerway

=== Premier League ===
==== League table ====
Pos	Team	Pld	W	D	L	GF	GA	GD	Pts
1	Zenit Saint Petersburg (C)	30	21	7	2	74	20	+54	70
2	CSKA Moscow	30	17	7	6	56	27	+29	58
3	Spartak Moscow	30	15	9	6	60	38	+22	54
4	Rostov	30	15	8	7	48	44	+4	53
5	Akhmat Grozny	30	15	5	10	51	39	+12	50

Source: Premier Liga
Rules for classification: 1) Points; 2) Head-to-head points; 3) Head-to-head matches won; 4) Head-to-head goal difference; 5) Head-to-head goals scored; 6) Matches won; 7) Goal difference; 8) Goals scored; 9) 2021–22 position (not applicable to final standings); 10) Play-off.
(C) Champions

==== Results summary ====
Overall								Home						Away					
Pld	W	D	L	GF	GA	GD	Pts	W	D	L	GF	GA	GD	W	D	L	GF	GA	GD
30	17	7	6	56	27	+29	58	11	3	1	38	11	+27	6	4	5	18	16	+2

Last updated: 3 June 2023.

==== Results by round ====
Round	1	2	3	4	5	6	7	8	9	10	11	12	13	14	15	16	17	18	19	20	21	22	23	24	25	26	27	28	29	30
Ground	H	H	A	H	A	H	A	A	H	A	A	H	H	A	A	H	A	A	H	H	A	H	A	H	A	H	H	A	A	H
Result	W	W	D	W	L	W	D	W	W	L	W	D	D	D	W	L	L	L	W	W	W	W	W	D	W	W	W	L	D	W
Position	3	1	3	1	4	3	3	2	2	3	2	4	3	3	3	4	5	5	5	5	5	4	4	4	4	2	2	2	2	2

Updated to match(es) played on 3 June 2023. Source:
A = Away; H = Home; W = Win; D = Draw; L = Loss

==== Results ====
16 July 2022 1	CSKA Moscow	2 – 0	Ural Yekaterinburg	Moscow
15:00 MSK (UTC+3)	Oblyakov 45'; Carrascal (yellow card) 61' (goal) 64' (pen.); Zaynutdinov (yellow card) 66'	Report	Pomazun (yellow card) 64'; Gadzhimuradov (yellow card) 66'; Yushin (yellow card) 81'	Stadium: VEB Arena; Attendance: 6,202; Referee: Vitali Meshkov

23 July 2022 2	CSKA Moscow	3 – 0	Sochi	Moscow
15:00 MSK (UTC+3)	Medina 36', 90+'; Carrascal 56'	Report		Stadium: VEB Arena; Attendance: 9,056; Referee: Vladimir Moskalyov

31 July 2022 3	Pari NN	2 – 2	CSKA Moscow	Nizhny Novgorod
15:00 MSK (UTC+3)	Kalinsky (yellow card) 21'; Suleymanov 60', 85' (yellow card) 65'	Report	Chalov 15'; Kuchayev 22'	Stadium: Nizhny Novgorod Stadium; Attendance: 11,847; Referee: Vitali Meshkov

6 August 2022 4	CSKA Moscow	4 – 1	Fakel Voronezh	Moscow
17:30 MSK (UTC+3)	Mukhin (yellow card) 56'; Kuchayev 58'; Medina 69' (pen.); Chalov 73'; Carrascal 83'	Report	Gongadze 43' (pen.) (yellow card) 45'	Stadium: VEB Arena; Attendance: 14,768; Referee: Yan Bobrovsky

13 August 2022 5	Zenit St.Petersburg	2 – 1	CSKA Moscow	Saint Petersburg
17:00 MSK (UTC+3)	Malcom 45+2'; Barrios (yellow card) 62' Mantuan 85' (yellow card) 90+'	Report	Kuchayev (yellow card) 38'; Akinfeev (yellow card) 54'; Mukhin (yellow card) 54'; Nababkin (yellow card) 62'; Chalov 63' (pen.); Zdjelar (yellow card) 84'	Stadium: Krestovsky Stadium; Attendance: 51,174; Referee: Pavel Kukuyan

21 August 2022 6	CSKA Moscow	4 – 2	Akhmat Grozny	Moscow
15:00 MSK (UTC+3)	Nababkin (yellow card) 14' (goal) 33'; Chalov 29'; Carrascal 35'; Mukhin (yellow card) 44'; Medina 78'	Report	Nižić (yellow card) 23'; Konaté 41'; Berisha 58'	Stadium: VEB Arena; Attendance: 13,568; Referee: Sergei Karasev

28 August 2022 7	Rostov	0 – 0	CSKA Moscow	Rostov-on-Don
19:45 MSK (UTC+3)	Komlichenko (yellow card) 41'	Report	Carrascal (yellow card) 30'	Stadium: Rostov Arena; Attendance: 8,616; Referee: Vitali Meshkov

4 September 2022 8	Krylia Sovetov	0 – 1	CSKA Moscow	Samara
15:00 MSK (UTC+3)	Yevgenyev (yellow card) 47'; Glushenkov (yellow card) 50'; Zotov (yellow card) 74'	Report	Zdjelar (yellow card) 23'; Carrascal (yellow card) 50'; Diveyev 79'	Stadium: Solidarnost Samara Arena; Attendance: 8,357; Referee: Artyom Lyubimov

10 September 2022 9	CSKA Moscow	4 – 1	Krasnodar	Moscow
17:30 MSK (UTC+3)	Carrascal 30' (pen.); Zdjelar (yellow card) 37'; Chalov 45+' (pen.); Medina 62' (pen.); Gaich (yellow card) 89' (goal) 90+'; Oblyakov (yellow card) 90'	Report	Safonov (yellow card) 29'; Krivtsov (yellow card) 35'; Ramírez 47'; Yakimov (yellow card) 67'; Batxi (yellow card) 84'; Akhmetov (yellow card) 88'	Stadium: VEB Arena; Attendance: 14,880; Referee: Sergey Ivanov

17 September 2022 10	Torpedo Moscow	1 – 0	CSKA Moscow	Moscow
14:00 MSK (UTC+3)	Le Tallec (yellow card) 15'; Kutepov (yellow card) 30'; Šapić 33'; Samsonov (yellow card) 43'; Lebedenko (yellow card) 62'; Erkinov (yellow card) 90+'; Baburin (yellow card) 90+'	Report	Moisés (yellow card) 32'; Diveyev (yellow card) 77'; Carrascal (yellow card) 90+'	Stadium: Luzhniki Stadium; Attendance: 8,395; Referee: Pavel Shadykhanov

1 October 2022 11	Khimki	1 – 2	CSKA Moscow	Khimki
16:30 MSK (UTC+3)	Magomedov 88'; Mirzov (yellow card) 90'	Report	Chalov 13', 38'; Mukhin (yellow card) 66'; Moisés (yellow card) 90+'	Stadium: Arena Khimki; Attendance: 4,230; Referee: Pavel Kukuyan

8 October 2022 12	CSKA Moscow	1 – 1	Dynamo Moscow	Moscow
16:30 MSK (UTC+3)	Willyan 13'; Chalov (yellow card) 77'	Report	Skopintsev (yellow card) 27'; Smolov 44'; Sazonov (yellow card) 65'; Gladyshev (yellow card) 90+'	Stadium: VEB Arena; Attendance: 9,521; Referee: Kirill Levnikov

16 October 2022 13	CSKA Moscow	2 – 2	Spartak Moscow	Moscow
20:00 MSK (UTC+3)	Moisés (yellow card) 14'; Chalov 17', 70' (yellow card) 76'; Willyan (yellow card) 41'; Yermakov (yellow card) 82'	Report	Promes (yellow card) 8'; Sobolev (yellow card) 14' (goal) 58'; Khlusevich (yellow card) 18'; Litvinov (yellow card) 41'; Zinkovsky 53'	Stadium: VEB Arena; Attendance: 17,102; Referee: Sergei Karasev

23 October 2022 14	Orenburg	2 – 2	CSKA Moscow	Orenburg
14:00 MSK (UTC+3)	Pisarsky 18', 64' (pen.); Gojković (yellow card) 79'	Report	Chalov 7'; Gojković 20' (o.g.); Zdjelar (yellow card) 64'; Gajić (yellow card) 65'; Moisés (yellow card) 89'	Stadium: Gazovik Stadium; Attendance: 7,781; Referee: Vladislav Bezborodov

29 October 2022 15	Lokomotiv Moscow	0 – 1	CSKA Moscow	Moscow
19:00 MSK (UTC+3)	Zhivoglyadov (yellow card) 67'	Report	Zaynutdinov (yellow card) 12'; Medina 22' (yellow card) 45+'; Ushakov (yellow card) 90' (yellow-red card) 90+'; Carrascal (yellow card) 90+'	Stadium: RZD Arena; Attendance: 11,035; Referee: Artyom Lyubimov

5 November 2022 16	CSKA Moscow	0 – 1	Pari NN	Moscow
19:00 MSK (UTC+3)	Fuchs (yellow card) 11'; Willyan (yellow card) 35'; Moisés (yellow card) 59'	Report	Aleksandrov 66' (yellow card) 68'; Mikhaylov (yellow card) 74'; Milson (yellow card) 83'; Kornyushin (yellow card) 90'	Stadium: VEB Arena; Attendance: 7,733; Referee: Sergey Ivanov

13 November 2022 17	Dynamo Moscow	2 – 1	CSKA Moscow	Moscow
19:30 MSK (UTC+3)	Skopintsev 40'; Fomin (yellow card) 51' (penalty missed) 80'; Ngamaleu 63'; Gladyshev (yellow card) 76' (yellow-red card) 82'	Report	Zaynutdinov (yellow card) 50'; Oblyakov 65' (yellow card) 72' (yellow-red card) 79'	Stadium: VTB Arena; Attendance: 25,048; Referee: Vladislav Bezborodov

5 March 2023 18	Sochi	2 – 0	CSKA Moscow	Sochi
19:30 MSK (UTC+3)	Sarveli (yellow card) 10'; Melkadze (yellow card) 66'; Đorđević 71', 78'	Report	Carrascal (yellow card) 63'; Glebov (yellow card) 90+'	Stadium: Fisht Olympic Stadium; Attendance: 4,419; Referee: Vladislav Bezborodov

12 March 2023 19	CSKA Moscow	4 – 0	Krylia Sovetov	Moscow
16:30 MSK (UTC+3)	Zabolotny 24'; Oblyakov 26'; Chalov 42'; Willyan 75'	Report		Stadium: VEB Arena; Attendance: 2,680; Referee: Kirill Levnikov

19 March 2023 20	CSKA Moscow	1 – 0	Zenit St.Petersburg	Moscow
18:30 MSK (UTC+3)	Willyan (yellow card) 54'; Chalov 72'	Report	Rodrigão (yellow card) 37'	Stadium: VEB Arena; Attendance: 9,974; Referee: Sergei Karasev

2 April 2023 21	Fakel Voronezh	0 – 2	CSKA Moscow	Voronezh
16:30 MSK (UTC+3)	Morozov (yellow card) 32'	Report	Chalov 21' (pen.); Oblyakov 77'; Gajić (yellow card) 79'	Stadium: Tsentralnyi Profsoyuz Stadion; Attendance: 13,029; Referee: Pavel Kukuyan

9 April 2023 22	CSKA Moscow	3 – 0	Khimki	Moscow
16:30 MSK (UTC+3)	Oblyakov 34'; Zaynutdinov 37'; Carrascal 61'; Mukhin (yellow card) 89'	Report	Dulayev (yellow card) 88'	Stadium: VEB Arena; Attendance: 3,970; Referee: Roman Galimov

15 April 2023 23	Ural Yekaterinburg	1 – 2	CSKA Moscow	Yekaterinburg
16:30 MSK (UTC+3)	Vloet 66' (pen.); Kashtanov (yellow card) 90'; Miškić (yellow card) 90+'	Report	Zabolotny 13'; Chalov 58' (pen.)	Stadium: Yekaterinburg Arena; Attendance: 9,026; Referee: Vladislav Bezborodov

23 April 2023 24	CSKA Moscow	1 – 1	Lokomotiv Moscow	Moscow
19:30 MSK (UTC+3)	Oblyakov (yellow card) 11'; Zabolotny 22' (yellow card) 82'; Zdjelar (yellow card) 33'; Gaich (yellow card) 60'; Kuchayev (yellow card) 86'	Report	Mitaj (yellow card) 31' (yellow-red card) 40'; Dzyuba (yellow card) 45+'; Isidor 87'; Maradishvili (yellow card) 90+'	Stadium: VEB Arena; Attendance: 8,315; Referee: Sergei Karasev

29 April 2023 25	Akhmat Grozny	1 – 3	CSKA Moscow	Grozny
16:30 MSK (UTC+3)	Konaté 80'	Report	Oblyakov 3', 22'; Gajić (yellow card) 63'; Akinfeev (yellow card) 69'; Mukhin 90+'	Stadium: Akhmat-Arena; Attendance: 4,527; Referee: Alexey Amelin

7 May 2023 26	CSKA Moscow	2 – 1	Orenburg	Moscow
16:30 MSK (UTC+3)	Diveyev 8'; Zdjelar (yellow card) 65'; Chalov 87'	Report	Florentín (yellow card) 44'; Ayupov (yellow card) 45+'; Stamatov (yellow card) 64'; Khotulyov (yellow card) 74'; Oganesyan 90+'	Stadium: VEB Arena; Attendance: 3,961; Referee: Vladimir Moskalyov

13 May 2023 27	CSKA Moscow	3 – 0	Torpedo Moscow	Moscow
19:00 MSK (UTC+3)	Chalov 5', 90' (pen.); Oblyakov 38'	Report	Ćurić (yellow card) 40'; Samsonov (yellow card) 87' (yellow-red card) 90+'	Stadium: VEB Arena; Attendance: 4,406; Referee: Vitali Meshkov

21 May 2023 28	Spartak Moscow	2 – 1	CSKA Moscow	Moscow
16:30 MSK (UTC+3)	Promes 44', 90' (penalty missed) 90'; Ignatov (yellow card) 58'; Sobolev (red card) 66'; Chernov (yellow card) 77'	Report	Medina 28'; Willyan (red card) 66'; Medina (yellow card) 72'	Stadium: Lukoil Arena; Attendance: 24,679; Referee: Sergei Karasev

27 May 2023 29	Krasnodar	0 – 0	CSKA Moscow	Krasnodar
19:00 MSK (UTC+3)	Pina (yellow card) 13'; Litvinov (red card) 57'	Report	Medina (yellow card) 83'	Stadium: Krasnodar Stadium; Attendance: 23,750; Referee: Kirill Levnikov

3 June 2023 30	CSKA Moscow	4 – 1	Rostov	Moscow
17:00 MSK (UTC+3)	Medina 9'; Chalov 16' (pen.), 33'; Willyan 25'	Report	Selyava (yellow card) 15'; Chernov 78'; Silyanov (yellow card) 89'	Stadium: VEB Arena; Attendance: 10,604; Referee: Kukuyan

=== Russian Cup ===
==== Group stage ====
Pos	Team	Pld	W	PW	PL	L	GF	GA	GD	Pts	Qualification
1	Ural Yekaterinburg	6	4	1	0	1	9	5	+4	14	Qualification to the Knockout phase (RPL path)
2	CSKA Moscow	6	4	0	1	1	8	4	+4	13	Qualification to the Knockout phase (RPL path)
3	Torpedo Moscow	6	2	0	1	3	6	7	−1	7	Qualification to the Knockout phase (regions path)
4	Sochi	6	0	1	0	5	6	13	−7	2	

Source: Russian Football Union (in Russian), Soccerway
Rules for classification: 1) Points; 2) Head-to-head points; 3) Head-to-head matches won; 4) Head-to-head goal difference; 5) Head-to-head goals scored; 6) Matches won; 7) Goal difference; 8) Goals scored; 9) Penalty shoot-out goal difference; 10) Draw.

31 August 2022 1	Torpedo Moscow	0 – 2	CSKA Moscow	Moscow
17:00 MSK (UTC+3)	Karaev (yellow card) 31'; Smolnikov (yellow card) 56'	Report	Diveyev (yellow card) 10'; Ermakov 14'; Fuchs (yellow card) 57'; Gaich 68'	Stadium: VTB Arena; Attendance: 3,449; Referee: Roman Galimov

14 September 2022 2	CSKA Moscow	2 – 1	Ural Yekaterinburg	Moscow
17:30 MSK (UTC+3)	Gaich (yellow card) 30'; Willyan 77'; Gajić 90+3'; Bokov (yellow card) 90+4'	Report	Beveyev (yellow card) 59'; Yushin 86'; Miškić (yellow card) 87'	Stadium: VEB Arena; Attendance: 2,501; Referee: Rafael Shafeev

28 September 2022 3	CSKA Moscow	2 – 1	Sochi	Moscow
20:00 MSK (UTC+3)	Kuchayev 23'; Chalov 73'	Report	Đorđević (yellow card) 39'; Sarveli 52'; Dzhanayev (yellow card) 85'	Stadium: VEB Arena; Attendance: 2,440; Referee: Aleksey Sukhoy

19 October 2022 4	CSKA Moscow	0 – 1	Torpedo Moscow	Moscow
20:30 MSK (UTC+3)	Zdjelar (yellow card) 77'; Moisés (yellow card) 79'	Report	Ćurić 11' (pen.); Caimacov (yellow card) 20'; Savić (yellow card) 87'; Smolnikov (yellow card) 90+7'	Stadium: VEB Arena; Attendance: 2,685; Referee: Anton Frolov

22 November 2022 5	Ural Yekaterinburg	0 – 0 (5 – 4 p)	CSKA Moscow	Yekaterinburg
15:00 MSK (UTC+3)	Sungatulin (yellow card) 9'; Beveyev (yellow card) 90+2'	Report	Yermakov (yellow card) 30'; Willyan (yellow card) 32'	Stadium: Yekaterinburg Arena; Attendance: 15,247; Referee: Artyom Chistyakov
	Penalties
	Shatov (penalty scored); Gazinsky (penalty scored); Ranđelović (penalty scored); Goglichidze (penalty scored); Tatarinov (penalty missed); Begić (penalty scored)		(penalty missed) Moisés; (penalty scored) Gajić; (penalty scored) Yakovlev; (penalty scored) Méndez; (penalty scored) Chalov; (penalty missed) Yermakov

26 November 2022 6	Sochi	1 – 2	CSKA Moscow	Sochi
16:00 MSK (UTC+3)	Drkušić 45+2'; Zaika (yellow card) 64'; Kravtsov (yellow card) 65'	Report	Yermakov 4'; Gajić (yellow card) 45+1'; Yurganov 60' (o.g.)	Stadium: Fisht Olympic Stadium; Attendance: 3,997; Referee: Aleksey Amelin

==== Knockout stage ====
23 February 2023 RPL path Quarter-finals 1st leg	CSKA Moscow	3 – 0	Krasnodar	Moscow
17:30 MSK (UTC+3)	Moisés 12'; Chalov 30'; Carrascal (penalty missed) 64'; Zabolotny 86'	Report	Kady (yellow card) 45+3'	Stadium: VEB Arena; Attendance: 6,546; Referee: Pavel Kukuyan

28 February 2023 RPL path Quarter-finals 2nd leg	Krasnodar	1 – 0 (1 – 3 agg.)	CSKA Moscow	Krasnodar
19:30 MSK (UTC+3)	Alonso (yellow card) 23'; Spertsyan 50'; Volkov (yellow card) 81'; Krivtsov (yellow card) 90+2'	Report		Stadium: Krasnodar Stadium; Attendance: 26,314; Referee: Sergei Karasev

15 March 2023 RPL path Semi-finals 1st leg	Krylia Sovetov	2 – 2	CSKA Moscow	Samara
17:30 MSK (UTC+3)	Pisarsky 49'; Tsypchenko 64'; Soldatenkov (yellow card) 82'; Kovalenko (yellow card) 90+3'	Report	Medina 46'; Oblyakov (yellow card) 60'; Chalov 76' (pen.); Nababkin (yellow card) 82'	Stadium: Solidarnost Samara Arena; Attendance: 10,364; Referee: Aleksey Sukhoy

5 April 2023 RPL path Semi-finals 2nd leg	CSKA Moscow	1 – 0 (3 – 2 agg.)	Krylia Sovetov	Moscow
19:30 MSK (UTC+3)	Willyan (yellow card) 76'; Carrascal (yellow card) 81'; Gajić (yellow card) 85'; Bijl 90+2' (o.g.)	Report	Yevgenyev (yellow card) 20'; Kovalenko (yellow card) 90+4'	Stadium: VEB Arena; Attendance: 7,849; Referee: Artyom Lyubimov

19 April 2023 RPL path Final 1st leg	CSKA Moscow	1 – 1	Ural Yekaterinburg	Moscow
19:00 MSK (UTC+3)	Medina 89' (pen.)	Report	Yegorychev (yellow card) 66'; Kashtanov (yellow card) 78'; Bicfalvi 70'; Emmerson (yellow card) 88'	Stadium: VEB Arena; Attendance: 6,725; Referee: Kirill Levnikov

3 May 2023 RPL path Final 2nd leg	Ural Yekaterinburg	1 – 2 (2 – 3 agg.)	CSKA Moscow	Yekaterinburg
17:00 MSK (UTC+3)	Vloet 51' (pen.); Begić (yellow card) 67'; Kulakov (yellow card) 87'; Pomazun (yellow card) 90+4'	Report	Medina 45+3'; Chalov 57'	Stadium: Yekaterinburg Arena; Attendance: 30,462; Referee: Sergey Ivanov

==== Final ====
11 June 2023	Krasnodar	1 – 1 (5 – 6 p)	CSKA Moscow	Moscow
17:00 MSK (UTC+3)	Córdoba 50'; Batxi (yellow card) 58'; Petrov (yellow card) 62'; Cobnan (yellow card) 79'	Report	Chalov 32' (pen.); Zdjelar (yellow card) 48'; Oblyakov (yellow card) 58'; Willyan (yellow card) 76'; Carrascal (yellow card) 86'; Diveyev (yellow card) 90'	Stadium: Luzhniki Stadium; Attendance: 53,425; Referee: Vladislav Bezborodov
	Penalties
	Spertsyan (penalty scored); Akhmetov (penalty scored); Córdoba (penalty scored); Batxi (penalty missed); Alonso (penalty scored); Ramírez (penalty scored); Olusegun (penalty missed)		(penalty scored) Chalov; (penalty scored) Diveyev; (penalty missed) Moisés; (penalty scored) Gajić; (penalty scored) Medina; (penalty scored) Carrascal; (penalty scored) Zabolotny

== Squad statistics ==
As of match played 11 June 2023

=== Appearances and goals ===
No.	Pos	Nat	Player	Total		Premier League		Russian Cup	
No.	Pos	Nat	Player	Apps	Goals	Apps	Goals	Apps	Goals
4	DF	(Brazil) BRA	Willyan Rocha	32	4	22	3	10	1
5	MF	(Serbia) SRB	Saša Zdjelar	38	0	21+6	0	9+2	0
6	MF	(Russia) RUS	Maksim Mukhin	24	1	9+8	1	5+2	0
8	MF	(Colombia) COL	Jorge Carrascal	34	6	16+10	6	3+5	0
9	FW	(Russia) RUS	Fyodor Chalov	41	24	29+1	19	8+3	5
10	MF	(Russia) RUS	Ivan Oblyakov	41	8	22+6	8	13	0
14	DF	(Russia) RUS	Kirill Nababkin	32	1	17+5	1	8+2	0
19	MF	(Kazakhstan) KAZ	Bakhtiyar Zaynutdinov	27	1	19+2	1	5+1	0
20	MF	(Russia) RUS	Konstantin Kuchayev	23	3	10+4	2	9	1
22	DF	(Serbia) SRB	Milan Gajić	42	1	27+2	0	11+2	1
27	DF	(Brazil) BRA	Moisés	36	1	22+2	0	11+1	1
28	MF	(Paraguay) PAR	Jesús Medina	33	11	24+1	8	6+2	3
35	GK	(Russia) RUS	Igor Akinfeev	35	0	29	0	6	0
41	MF	(Russia) RUS	Yegor Ushakov	5	0	1+3	0	1	0
42	DF	(Russia) RUS	Georgi Shchennikov	6	0	2+1	0	2+1	0
49	GK	(Russia) RUS	Vladislav Torop	8	0	1	0	7	0
53	MF	(Russia) RUS	Kirill Glebov	7	0	1+5	0	0+1	0
72	MF	(Russia) RUS	Nikita Yermakov	31	2	0+22	0	4+5	2
77	DF	(Russia) RUS	Ilya Agapov	3	0	1+1	0	1	0
78	DF	(Russia) RUS	Igor Diveyev	27	2	20	2	5+2	0
88	MF	(Chile) CHI	Víctor Méndez	38	0	22+4	0	8+4	0
90	DF	(Russia) RUS	Matvey Lukin	3	0	1+1	0	0+1	0
91	FW	(Russia) RUS	Anton Zabolotny	35	4	11+13	3	5+6	1
92	DF	(Russia) RUS	Yegor Noskov	5	0	1+3	0	0+1	0
Players away from the club on loan:
3	DF	(Brazil) BRA	Bruno Fuchs	8	0	2+2	0	3+1	0
21	FW	(Argentina) ARG	Adolfo Gaich	11	2	0+8	1	3	1
46	FW	(Russia) RUS	Vladislav Yakovlev	14	0	0+9	0	0+5	0
Players who appeared for CSKA Moscow but left during the season:

=== Goal scorers ===
Place	Position	Nation	Number	Name	Premier League	Russian Cup	Total
1	FW	(Russia)	9	Fyodor Chalov	19	5	24
2	MF	(Paraguay)	28	Jesús Medina	8	3	11
3	MF	(Russia)	10	Ivan Oblyakov	8	0	8
4	MF	(Colombia)	8	Jorge Carrascal	6	0	6
5	DF	(Brazil)	4	Willyan Rocha	3	1	4
5	FW	(Russia)	91	Anton Zabolotny	3	1	4
7	MF	(Russia)	20	Konstantin Kuchayev	2	1	3
7				Own goal	1	2	3
9	DF	(Russia)	78	Igor Diveyev	2	0	2
9	FW	(Argentina)	21	Adolfo Gaich	1	1	2
9	MF	(Russia)	72	Nikita Yermakov	0	2	2
12	DF	(Russia)	14	Kirill Nababkin	1	0	1
12	MF	(Russia)	6	Maksim Mukhin	1	0	1
12	MF	(Kazakhstan)	19	Bakhtiyar Zaynutdinov	1	0	1
12	DF	(Serbia)	22	Milan Gajić	0	1	1
12	DF	(Brazil)	27	Moisés	0	1	1
Total					56	18	74

=== Clean sheets ===
Place	Position	Nation	Number	Name	Premier League	Russian Cup	Total
1	GK	(Russia)	35	Igor Akinfeev	10	1	11
2	GK	(Russia)	49	Vladislav Torop	1	3	4
Total					11	4	15

=== Disciplinary record ===
Number	Nation	Position	Name	Premier League		Russian Cup		Total	
Number	Nation	Position	Name	Yellow card	Red card	Yellow card	Red card	Yellow card	Red card
4	(Brazil)	DF	Willyan Rocha	3	1	3	0	6	1
5	(Serbia)	MF	Saša Zdjelar	6	0	2	0	8	0
6	(Russia)	MF	Maksim Mukhin	5	0	0	0	5	0
8	(Colombia)	MF	Jorge Carrascal	6	0	2	0	8	0
9	(Russia)	FW	Fyodor Chalov	2	0	0	0	2	0
10	(Russia)	MF	Ivan Oblyakov	4	1	2	0	6	1
14	(Russia)	DF	Kirill Nababkin	2	0	1	0	3	0
19	(Kazakhstan)	MF	Bakhtiyar Zaynutdinov	3	0	0	0	3	0
20	(Russia)	MF	Konstantin Kuchayev	2	0	0	0	2	0
22	(Serbia)	DF	Milan Gajić	4	0	2	0	6	0
27	(Brazil)	DF	Moisés	5	0	1	0	6	0
28	(Paraguay)	MF	Jesús Medina	2	0	0	0	2	0
35	(Russia)	GK	Igor Akinfeev	2	0	0	0	2	0
41	(Russia)	MF	Yegor Ushakov	2	1	0	0	2	1
53	(Russia)	MF	Kirill Glebov	1	0	0	0	1	0
72	(Russia)	MF	Nikita Yermakov	1	0	1	0	2	0
78	(Russia)	DF	Igor Diveyev	1	0	2	0	3	0
88	(Chile)	MF	Víctor Méndez	1	0	0	0	1	0
91	(Russia)	FW	Anton Zabolotny	1	0	0	0	1	0
Players away on loan:
3	(Brazil)	DF	Bruno Fuchs	1	0	1	0	2	0
21	(Argentina)	FW	Adolfo Gaich	1	0	1	0	2	0
45	(Russia)	GK	Danila Bokov	0	0	1	0	0	0
Players who left CSKA Moscow during the season:
Total				55	3	19	0	74	3
