= 2020–21 PFC CSKA Moscow season =

CSKA Moscow
2020–21 season
- Chairman: Yevgeni Giner
- Manager: Viktor Goncharenko (until 22 March); Ivica Olić (from 23 March)
- Stadium: VEB Arena
- Premier League: 6th
- Russian Cup: Semi-finals vs Lokomotiv Moscow
- Europa League: Group stage
- Top goalscorer: League: Nikola Vlašić (11); All: Nikola Vlašić (12)
- Highest home attendance: 13,330 vs Spartak Moscow (13 September 2020)
- Lowest home attendance: 4,315 vs Ural Yekaterinburg (13 December 2020)
- Average home league attendance: 7,162 (8 May 2021)
Home colours	Away colours	Third colours

The 2020–21 PFC CSKA Moscow season was the club's 110th season in existence and the 29th consecutive season in the top flight of Russian football. In addition to the domestic league, CSKA Moscow participates in this season's editions of the Russian Cup and UEFA Europa League. The season covers the period from August 2020 to 30 June 2021. CSKA Moscow finished the season in 6th place, were knocked out of the Russian Cup by Lokomotiv Moscow in the semifinals, and finished 4th in their UEFA Europa League group.

== Season events ==
=== Summer Transfers ===
On 20 July, Vitali Zhironkin returned to Baltika Kaliningrad on loan for the 2020–21 season.

On 31 July, Maksim Yeleyev signed a new contract with CSKA Moscow, until the summer of 2024, and moved to Akron Tolyatti on a season-long loan deal. Also on 31 July, Khetag Khosonov left CSKA to move permanently to Alania Vladikavkaz.

On 5 August, Cédric Gogoua joined Rotor Volgograd on a season-long loan deal, with the option to make the move permanent, whilst Ilya Pomazun extended his CSKA contract until the end of the 2024–25 season, and moved to Ural Yekaterinburg on loan for the season. Later the same day, CSKA announced the signing of Adolfo Gaich to a five-year contract, from San Lorenzo.

On 7 August, CSKA agreed a new one-year contract with Kirill Nababkin after his previous contract had expired at the end of the previous season.

On 11 August, Lassana N'Diaye joined Swedish Superettan club AFC Eskilstuna on loan for the remainder of 2020.

On 12 August, Timur Zhamaletdinov was sold to FC Ufa.

On 20 August, Gocha Gogrichiani moved to Akron Tolyatti on loan for the season.

On 25 August, CSKA announced the signing of Baktiyar Zaynutdinov from Rostov on a five-year contract, and Bruno Fuchs from Internacional also on a five-year contract.

On 28 August, CSKA announced the signing of Chidera Ejuke from SC Heerenveen on a four-year contract.

=== August ===
CSKA opened the season with an away trip to newly promoted FC Khimki, which they won 2–0 thanks to first half goals from Konstantin Kuchayev and Alan Dzagoev. In CSKA's second game of the season, they defeated Tambov 2–1, with Kuchayev scoring his second goal of the season and Ilya Shkurin scoring his first for the club.

On 19 August, CSKA faced Zenit St.Petersburg in the first 'El-Clasikov' of the season. CSKA lost the match 2–1 to Zenit, with Vlašić scoring CSKA's only goal.

On 22 August, CSKA hosted Rubin Kazan at the VEB Arena, losing 2–1 to a later winner scored by Denis Makarov, after Nikola Vlašić had cancelled out Soltmurad Bakayev's opener.

On 26 August, CSKA traveled to Krasnodar, drawing 1-1 after Wanderson cancelled out Konstantin Kuchayev's third goal of the season.

On 30 August, CSKA faced Akhmat Grozny at the Akhmat-Arena in Grozny, where a first half goal from Konstantin Kuchayev and two late second-half goals from Kristijan Bistrović and Nikola Vlašić, saw CSKA turn out 3–0 winners.

=== September ===
On 11 September, Nair Tiknizyan signed a new contract with CSKA, until the end of the 2024–25 season.

On 13 September, CSKA hosted Spartak Moscow in the first Moscow derby of the season at the VEB Arena. Spartak opened the scoring in the 11th minute through Ezequiel Ponce, before Hörður Magnússon and Nikola Vlašić scored before half-time to give CSKA the lead. In injury time at the end of the match Chidera Ejuke scored his first goal for CSKA and to seal a 3–1 victory.

On 18 September, Jaka Bijol was loaned to Hannover 96 for one-season.

On 20 September, CSKA travelled to Ufa, where a 65th-minute goal from Kristijan Bistrović secured the win for CSKA.

On 27 September, CSKA hosted Lokomotiv Moscow in the second Moscow derby of the season. Fyodor Smolov scored the only goal of the game, whilst Kristijan Bistrović was sent off for two bookable offence with the game ending 1–0 to Lokomotiv.

=== October ===
CSKA started October by being drawn into a Europa League group with Wolfsberger AC, Dinamo Zagreb and Feyenoord on 2 October. The following day, 3 October, CSKA played Ural Yekaterinburg at the Central Stadium in Yekaterinburg and ran out 2–0 winners. After Hörður Magnússon was shown a red card early in the second half, goals from Baktiyar Zaynutdinov and Konstantin Maradishvili gave CSKA the win.

Following the international break, CSKA host Dynamo Moscow at the VEB Arena on 18 October. After an early Fyodor Chalov goal was ruled out, Konstantin Kuchayev scored his fifth goal of the season to give CSKA the lead in the 51st minute. Chidera Ejuke doubled CSKA's lead three minutes later, before Nikola Moro made it three goals in six minutes to make it 2–1. Igor Diveyev scored CSKA's third goal of the game before Roman Yevgenyev was sent off for a second booking, with the game ending 3–1 to CSKA.

CSKA traveled to Austria on 22 October to face Wolfsberger AC in the first group match of their UEFA Europa League campaign. Adolfo Gaich opened the scoring with his first goal for the club in fifth minute, before a forty-second-minute penalty from Michael Liendl, after a Viktor Vasin foul, levelled the scoring. With neither side finding the net in the second half, the game finished 1–1.

On 26 October, CSKA hosted Arsenal Tula at the VEB Arena, with Fyodor Chalov opening the scoring in stoppage time at the end of the first half from the penalty spot. In the second, CSKA continued their scoring with Nikola Vlašić scoring a brace before Luka Đorđević pulled one back for Arsenal Tula and Arnór Sigurðsson and Ivan Oblyakov rounded off the scoring to see CSKA run out 5–1 winner. Three days later, 29 October, CSKA played out a 0–0 draw with Dinamo Zagreb at the VEB Arena in the second game day of the UEFA Europa League.

=== November ===
CSKA travelled to Rotor Volgograd on 1 November, winning 1–0 thanks to a first-half goal from Alan Dzagoev.

On 4 November, CSKA extended their contract with Vadim Karpov until the summer of 2025. The following day, 5 November, CSKA faced Feyenoord at De Kuip in their third UEFA Europa League match. Feyenoord won the match 3–1, with CSKA's consolation goal coming from a Marcos Senesi own goal in the 80th minute, leaving CSKA at the bottom of Group K on 2 points at the half was point of the group stages.

On 8 November, CSKA hosted Rostov at the VEB Arena, winning 2–0 with a goal in each half. Konstantin Kuchayev scored his sixth of the season with a deflected shot past Sergei Pesyakov, before Roman Eremenko missed a penalty for Rostov, and Fyodor Chalov sealed the victory for CSKA in the 74th minute.

On 20 November, CSKA extended their contract with Fyodor Chalov until the summer of 2024.

On 22 November, CSKA hosted Sochi at the VEB Arena in the 15th round of the Russian Premier League. The match ended 1-1, with Arnór Sigurðsson giving CSKA the lead in the 5th minute and Nikita Burmistrov equalising for Sochi in the 23rd minute. Four days later, CSKA drew 0–0 at home to Feyenoord in the Europa League. CSKA suffered their first league defeat in six games on 29 November, losing 1–0 to Rubin Kazan at the Ak Bars Arena.

=== December ===
CSKA were knocked out of the UEFA Europa League with one group remaining on 3 December, after suffering a 1–0 home defeat to Wolfsberger AC. The following day, 4 December, Kristijan Bistrović extended his contract with CSKA until the summer of 2025.

On 6 December, CSKA hosted Khimki at the VEB Arena. After Nikola Vlašić initially gave CSKA the lead in the first half, Khimki scored twice within 5 minutes through Ilya Kukharchuk and Reziuan Mirzov at the start of the second half before Ilya Shkurin rounded off the scoring with an equaliser for CSKA in the 54th minute.

On 10 December, CSKA traveled to Zagreb to face Dinamo Zagreb in their last Europa League group match, losing 3–1 with Kristijan Bistrović scoring CSKA's consolation goal. Three days later, 13 December, CSKA hosted Ural Yekaterinburg at the VEB Arena. Ilya Shkurin gave CSKA the lead in the 12th minute before Andrei Yegorychev equalised in the 31st minute to end the first half 1-1. In the second half, Pavel Pogrebnyak was sent off for two yellow cards in quick succession before Nikola Vlašić restored CSKA's lead from the penalty spot in the 61st minute. Ihor Kalinin scored a 90th-minute equaliser for Ural, before Shkurin received a straight red card for a challenge and the game ending 2-2 and extending CSKA's win-less streak to 7 games.

On 17 December, CSKA travelled to the Rostov Arena to face Rostov in their last game of 2020. A hat-trick from Fyodor Chalov secured all three points for CSKA, with Aleksei Kozlov scoring a consolation goal for Rostov.

=== January ===
On 13 January, Vitali Zhironkin returned to CSKA after his loan deal to Baltika Kaliningrad was ended early.

On 21 January, CSKA Moscow signed defender Aleksei Sukharev from Avangard Kursk after he'd previously spent time on loan at CSKA during the 2019–20 season. The following day, 22 January, Kristijan Bistrović moved to Kasımpaşa on loan for the remainder of the season, with an option for the transfer to be made permanent.

On 30 January, Adolfo Gaich joined Benevento on loan for the remainder of the season.

=== February ===
On 1 February, Vitali Zhironkin joined KAMAZ on loan for the remainder of the season.

On 11 February, Takuma Nishimura joined Vegalta Sendai permanently having been on loan at the club for the previous season.

On 15 February, CSKA announced the signing of Emil Bohinen from Stabæk on a contract until the end of the 2024/25 season, and the loan signing of Salomón Rondón from Dalian Professional.

On 18 February, Mário Fernandes extended his contract with CSKA until the summer of 2024.

On 20 February, Tigran Avanesyan joined Tambov on loan for the remainder of the season.

On 21 February, CSKA hosted SKA-Khabarovsk in the Last 16 round of the Russian Cup. A first half goal from Ilzat Akhmetov and a second half goal from Nikola Vlašić gave CSKA a 2–0 victory over the FNL side.

On 22 February, Maksim Yeleyev joined Yenisey Krasnoyarsk on loan for the remainder of the season.

On 25 February, transfer deadline day, Lassana N'Diaye joined Veles Moscow on loan for the remainder of the season, and Nikita Kotin joined Irtysh Omsk on a similar deal, whilst Ilya Pomazun had returned early from his loan to Ural Yekaterinburg.

On 27 February, CSKA faced Lokomotiv Moscow in their first Russian Premier League game after the winter break. First half goals from Vitaly Lisakovich and Grzegorz Krychowiak secured the win for Lokomotiv.

=== March ===
On 6 March, CSKA hosted Akhmat Grozny at the VEB Arena, winning 2–0 after goals from Salomón Rondón and Nikola Vlašić.

On 13 March, CSKA faced Arsenal Tula at the Arsenal Stadium, losing 2–1. Arsenal took a 2–0 half time lead through goal from Vladislav Panteleyev and Aleksandr Lomovitsky, before Nair Tiknizyan scored a late conciliation goal and Aleksandr Dovbnya and Valeriy Gromyko were sent off.

On 17 March, CSKA hosted Zenit St.Petersburg at the VEB Arena, losing 3–2. CSKA took the lead through former Zenit striker Salomón Rondón in the 28th minute, with Artem Dzyuba equalising in the 33rd minute before missing a penalty in the 45th minute. In the second half Wendel scored twice, with Ilzat Akhmetov being sent-off for CSKA in between the two goals, before Nikola Vlašić scored a stoppage time penalty to end the match 3–2.

On 22 March, Viktor Goncharenko left his role as head coach of CSKA Moscow by mutual consent. The following day, 23 March, CSKA announced Ivica Olić as their new head coach.

=== April ===
On 4 April, new head coach, Ivica Olić, took charge of his first game for CSKA, away to Tambov. After Artyom Arkhipov game Tambov the lead from the penalty spot in the 16th minute, Nikola Vlašić equalised from the penalty spot 10 minutes later before Salomón Rondón also scored from the spot in the 52nd minute. Vlašić would later miss another penalty in the 64th minute, with the match ending 2–1 to CSKA. 4 days later, 8 April, CSKA played Arsenal Tula at the Arsenal Stadium in the Russian Cup. After falling behind to a Yevgeni Lutsenko first-half goal, Vadim Karpov equalised early in the second half, before Lutsenko was then sent-off and Mário Fernandes sealed the win in the 86th minute, to send CSKA through to the semifinal of the Cup. CSKA hosted Rotor Volgograd on 12 April at the VEB Arena. After Chidera Ejuke gave CSKA the lead just before half-time, Salomón Rondón doubled CSKA's lead in the 70th minute to earn CSKA a 2–0 victory over Rotor to leave them fourth in the table. On 18 April, CSKA traveled to Sochi to face PFC Sochi, where Igor Diveyev's second half goal wasn't enough to prevent Sochi winning 2–1, leaving CSKA 5th in the table.

On 21 April, CSKA faced Lokomotiv Moscow in the semifinal of the Russian Cup at the RZD Arena. François Kamano gave Lokomotiv the lead in the 16th minute, after Salomón Rondón had earlier had a goal ruled out. Fyodor Smolov extended Lokomotiv's lead early in the second half before Grzegorz Krychowiak sealed the victory for Lokomotiv in injury time, and knock CSKA out of the Cup. On 25 April, CSKA lost their third game in a row under Ivica Olić, losing 1–0 to Spartak Moscow at the Otkritie Arena after Ilzat Akhmetov was sentoff in the first half and Jordan Larsson scored the only goal of the game in the second half, leaving CSKA 6th in the table.

=== May ===
On 1 May, CSKA hosted Ufa at the VEB Arena. Filip Mrzljak gave Ufa the lead in the 66th minute before Fyodor Chalov equalised 5 minutes later for CSKA to end the game 1–1.

On 8 May, CSKA hosted Krasnodar in their last home game of the season. Viktor Claesson gave Krasnodar the lead in the 26th minute, with Chidera Ejuke equalising six minutes later. Fyodor Chalov gave CSKA the lead in the 56th minute before Mário Fernandes finished off the scoring in the 69th minute to give CSKA a 3–1 victory and leaving them in 6th position going in to the last game of the season, 2 points off the European places.

On 16 May, CSKA ended their season with a 3–2 away defeat to Dynamo Moscow, which left them finishing sixth in the league. Nair Tiknizyan gave CSKA the lead in the first half, before two goals from Vyacheslav Grulyov gave Dynamo Moscow the lead. Chidera Ejuke equalised for CSKA in the 79th minute before Arsen Zakharyan won it for Dynamo in the 89th minute.

== Squad ==
As of match played 16 May 2021

Number	Name	Nationality	Position	Date of birth (age)	Signed from	Signed in	Contract ends	Apps.	Goals
Goalkeepers
1	Ilya Pomazun	(Russia)	GK	16 August 1996 (aged 24)	Academy	2012	2025	9	0
35	Igor Akinfeev	(Russia)	GK	8 April 1986 (aged 35)	Academy	2003	2022	674	0
45	Danila Bokov	(Russia)	GK	8 September 2002 (aged 18)	Academy	2021		0	0
49	Vladislav Torop	(Russia)	GK	7 November 2003 (aged 17)	Academy	2019	2022	0	0
Defenders
2	Mário Fernandes	(Russia)	DF	19 September 1990 (aged 30)	Grêmio	2012	2024	299	8
3	Bruno Fuchs	(Brazil)	DF	1 April 1999 (aged 22)	Internacional	2020	2025	1	0
5	Viktor Vasin	(Russia)	DF	6 October 1988 (aged 32)	Spartak Nalchik	2011	2021	92	2
14	Kirill Nababkin	(Russia)	DF	8 September 1986 (aged 34)	Moscow	2010	2021	252	4
23	Hörður Magnússon	(Iceland)	DF	11 February 1993 (aged 28)	Bristol City	2018		89	5
42	Georgi Shchennikov	(Russia)	DF	27 April 1991 (aged 30)	Academy	2008	2023	345	10
62	Vadim Karpov	(Russia)	DF	14 July 2002 (aged 18)	Academy	2019	2025	33	1
64	Aleksei Sukharev	(Russia)	DF	11 January 2003 (aged 18)	Avangard Kursk	2021		0	0
78	Igor Diveyev	(Russia)	DF	27 September 1999 (aged 21)	Ufa	2019	2024	77	4
Midfielders
7	Ilzat Akhmetov	(Russia)	MF	31 December 1997 (aged 23)	Rubin Kazan	2018	2022	82	5
8	Nikola Vlašić	(Croatia)	MF	4 October 1997 (aged 23)	Everton	2019	2024	103	33
10	Alan Dzagoev	(Russia)	MF	17 June 1990 (aged 30)	Krylia Sovetov-SOK Dimitrovgrad	2008	2021	375	77
17	Arnór Sigurðsson	(Iceland)	MF	15 May 1999 (aged 22)	IFK Norrköping	2018	2023	87	13
19	Baktiyar Zaynutdinov	(Kazakhstan)	MF	2 April 1998 (aged 23)	Rostov	2020	2025	25	1
20	Konstantin Kuchayev	(Russia)	MF	18 March 1998 (aged 23)	Academy	2015	2023	100	8
22	Konstantin Maradishvili	(Russia)	MF	7 February 2000 (aged 21)	Academy	2019	2025	46	0
71	Nair Tiknizyan	(Russia)	MF	12 May 1999 (aged 22)	Academy	2013	2025	42	2
75	Ruslan Daurov	(Russia)	MF	11 September 2002 (aged 18)	Spartak Vladikavkaz	2019		0	0
88	Emil Bohinen	(Norway)	MF	12 March 1999 (aged 22)	Stabæk	2021	2025	4	0
98	Ivan Oblyakov	(Russia)	MF	5 July 1998 (aged 22)	Ufa	2018	2023	102	8
Forwards
9	Fyodor Chalov	(Russia)	FW	10 April 1998 (aged 23)	Academy	2015	2022	161	46
11	Chidera Ejuke	(Nigeria)	FW	2 January 1998 (aged 23)	SC Heerenveen	2020	2024	33	5
32	Salomón Rondón	(Venezuela)	FW	16 September 1989 (aged 31)	loan from Dalian Professional	2021	2021	13	4
46	Vladislav Yakovlev	(Russia)	FW	14 February 2002 (aged 19)	Academy	2021		2	0
99	Ilya Shkurin	(Belarus)	FW	17 August 1999 (aged 21)	Dynamo Brest	2020	2024	19	3
Away on loan
13	Nikita Kotin	(Russia)	DF	1 September 2002 (aged 18)	Krylia Sovetov	2020	2023	0	0
18	Lassana N'Diaye	(Mali)	FW	3 October 2000 (aged 20)	Guidars	2018	2023	0	0
21	Adolfo Gaich	(Argentina)	FW	26 February 1999 (aged 22)	San Lorenzo	2020	2025	18	1
25	Kristijan Bistrović	(Croatia)	MF	9 April 1998 (aged 23)	Slaven Belupo	2018	2025	88	6
27	Cédric Gogoua	(Ivory Coast)	DF	10 July 1994 (aged 26)	Tambov	2019	2023	5	1
29	Jaka Bijol	(Slovenia)	MF	5 February 1999 (aged 22)	Rudar Velenje	2018	2023	66	6
53	Maksim Yeleyev	(Russia)	DF	3 March 2001 (aged 20)	Academy	2019	2024	1	0
81	Vitali Zhironkin	(Russia)	FW	10 March 2000 (aged 21)	Academy	2018	2022	0	0
	Gocha Gogrichiani	(Russia)	MF	5 May 2000 (aged 21)	Rostov	2020		0	0
	Tigran Avanesyan	(Russia)	MF	13 April 2002 (aged 19)	Academy	2018		0	0
Players who left during the season
19	Takuma Nishimura	(Japan)	FW	15 May 1999 (aged 22)	IFK Norrköping	2018	2022	23	4
75	Timur Zhamaletdinov	(Russia)	FW	21 May 1997 (aged 23)	Academy	2014	2021	42	5

=== Out on loan ===
Note: Flags indicate national team as defined under FIFA eligibility rules; some limited exceptions apply. Players may hold more than one non-FIFA nationality.

No.	Pos.	Nation	Player
13	DF	RUS	Nikita Kotin (at Irtysh Omsk)
18	FW	MLI	Lassana N'Diaye (at Veles Moscow)
21	FW	ARG	Adolfo Gaich (at Benevento)
25	MF	CRO	Kristijan Bistrović (at Kasımpaşa)
27	DF	CIV	Cédric Gogoua (at Rotor Volgograd)

No.	Pos.	Nation	Player
29	MF	SLO	Jaka Bijol (at Hannover 96)
53	DF	RUS	Maksim Yeleyev (at Yenisey Krasnoyarsk)
81	FW	RUS	Vitali Zhironkin (at KAMAZ)
—	MF	RUS	Gocha Gogrichiani (at Akron Tolyatti)
—	MF	RUS	Tigran Avanesyan (at Tambov)

== Transfers ==
=== In ===
Date	Position	Nationality	Name	From	Fee	Ref.
5 August 2020	FW	(Argentina)	Adolfo Gaich	San Lorenzo	Undisclosed	
25 August 2020	DF	(Brazil)	Bruno Fuchs	Internacional	Undisclosed	
25 August 2020	MF	(Kazakhstan)	Baktiyar Zaynutdinov	Rostov	Undisclosed	
28 August 2020	FW	(Nigeria)	Chidera Ejuke	SC Heerenveen	Undisclosed	
21 January 2021	DF	(Russia)	Aleksei Sukharev	Avangard Kursk	Undisclosed	
15 February 2021	MF	(Norway)	Emil Bohinen	Stabæk	Undisclosed	

=== Loans in ===
Date from	Position	Nationality	Name	From	Date to	Ref.
15 February 2021	FW	(Venezuela)	Salomón Rondón	Dalian Professional	End of season	

=== Out ===
Date	Position	Nationality	Name	To	Fee	Ref.
31 July 2020	MF	(Russia)	Khetag Khosonov	Alania Vladikavkaz	Undisclosed	
12 August 2020	FW	(Russia)	Timur Zhamaletdinov	Ufa	Undisclosed	
11 February 2020	FW	(Japan)	Takuma Nishimura	Vegalta Sendai	Undisclosed	

=== Loans out ===
Date from	Position	Nationality	Name	To	Date to	Ref.
26 March 2020	FW	(Japan)	Takuma Nishimura	Vegalta Sendai	31 December 2020	
20 July 2020	FW	(Russia)	Vitali Zhironkin	Baltika Kaliningrad	13 January 2021	
31 July 2020	DF	(Russia)	Maksim Yeleyev	Akron Tolyatti	20 February 2021	
5 August 2020	GK	(Russia)	Ilya Pomazun	Ural Yekaterinburg	25 February 2021	
5 August 2020	DF	(Ivory Coast)	Cédric Gogoua	Rotor Volgograd	End of season	
11 August 2020	FW	(Mali)	Lassana N'Diaye	AFC Eskilstuna	31 December 2020	
20 August 2020	MF	(Russia)	Gocha Gogrichiani	Akron Tolyatti	End of season	
18 September 2020	MF	(Slovenia)	Jaka Bijol	Hannover 96	End of season	
22 January 2021	MF	(Croatia)	Kristijan Bistrović	Kasımpaşa	End of season	
30 January 2021	FW	(Argentina)	Adolfo Gaich	Benevento	End of season	
1 February 2021	FW	(Russia)	Vitali Zhironkin	KAMAZ	End of season	
20 February 2021	MF	(Russia)	Tigran Avanesyan	Tambov	End of season	
22 February 2021	DF	(Russia)	Maksim Yeleyev	Yenisey Krasnoyarsk	End of season	
25 February 2021	DF	(Russia)	Nikita Kotin	Irtysh Omsk	End of season	
25 February 2021	FW	(Mali)	Lassana N'Diaye	Veles Moscow	End of season	

=== Released ===
Date	Position	Nationality	Name	Joined	Date	Ref.
17 August 2020	FW	(Russia)	Yegor Shapovalov			
31 December 2020	MF	(Russia)	Grigori Lobanov			

=== Trial ===
Date From	Date To	Position	Nationality	Name	Last club	Ref.
27 March 2021		DF	(Russia)	Konstantin Nizhegorodov	Hansa Rostock	

== Friendlies ==
1 August 2020	CSKA Moscow	0 – 0	Rotor Volgograd	Vatutinki
12:00 MSK (UTC+3)		Report		Stadium: Training Centre; Attendance: 0
Note: Match played behind closed doors.

8 September 2020	CSKA Moscow	1 – 0	Arsenal Tula	Moscow
16:00 MSK (UTC+3)	Tiknizyan (yellow card) 39'; T.Avanesyan (yellow card) 51'; Gaich 90'	Report	Čaušić (yellow card) 19'; R.Izotov (yellow card) 88'	Stadium: VEB Arena

13 October 2020	CSKA Moscow	1 – 1	Arsenal Tula	Vatutinki
16:00 MSK (UTC+3)	Gaich 55' (pen.)	Report	Panteleyev 28' (pen.)	Stadium: Training Centre

23 January 2021	CSKA Moscow (Russia)	7 – 0	(Spain) Trialist XI	Dehesa de Campoamor, Spain
18:00 MSK (UTC+3)	Chalov 6'; Magnússon 14'; Akhmetov 22'; Sigurðsson 33'; Vlašić 39' (pen.); Dzagoev 45'; Shkurin 87'	Report

28 January 2021	CSKA Moscow (Russia)	5 – 0	(Spain) Real Murcia	Dehesa de Campoamor, Spain
13:00 MSK (UTC+3)	Vlašić 8'; Zaynutdinov 33'; Ejuke 63'; Shkurin 80'; Avanesyan 82'	Report

3 February 2021	CSKA Moscow (Russia)	3 – 1	(Spain) Real Murcia	Dehesa de Campoamor, Spain
13:00 MSK (UTC+3)	Molinero 5' (o.g.); Shkurin 71'; Vlašić 87'	Report	Carrillo 62'

3 February 2021	CSKA Moscow (Russia)	6 – 2	(Spain) La Unión	Dehesa de Campoamor, Spain
20:00 MSK (UTC+3)	Tiknizyan 3'; V.Yakovlev 36'; Maradishvili (yellow card) 65'; Shkurin 71'; N.Kotin (yellow card) 74'; Hari 77' (o.g.); Chalov 84'; Akhmetov 90' (pen.)	Report	Sanchez 39' (pen.); Hernandez 55'

17 February 2021	CSKA Moscow (Russia)	1 – 1	(Spain) Cartagena	Dehesa de Campoamor, Spain
14:00 MSK (UTC+3)	Shchennikov (yellow card) 20'; Shkurin 73'	Report	Gil 2'

17 February 2021	CSKA Moscow (Russia)	1 – 0	(Spain) Racing Murcia	Dehesa de Campoamor, Spain
18:00 MSK (UTC+3)	Vasin (yellow card) 71'; Chalov 88' (yellow card) 89'	Report

== Competitions ==
=== Overview ===
Competition	First match	Last match	Starting round	Final position	Record							
Competition	First match	Last match	Starting round	Final position	Pld	W	D	L	GF	GA	GD	Win %
Premier League	8 August 2020	May 2021	Matchday 1		30	15	5	10	51	33	+18	50.00
Russian Cup	2020		Round of 32		1	1	0	0	2	0	+2	100.00
UEFA Europa League	22 October 2020	10 December 2020	Group Stage	Group Stage	6	0	3	3	3	8	−5	0.00
Total					37	16	8	13	56	41	+15	43.24

Last updated: 16 May 2021
Source: Competitions

=== Premier League ===
==== League table ====
Pos	Team	Pld	W	D	L	GF	GA	GD	Pts	Qualification or relegation
4	Rubin Kazan	30	16	5	9	42	33	+9	53 (Note: Head-to-head points: Rubin 3, Sochi 3. Overall matches won: Rubin 16, Sochi 15.)	Qualification for the Europa Conference League third qualifying round
5	Sochi	30	15	8	7	49	33	+16	53	Qualification for the Europa Conference League second qualifying round
6	CSKA Moscow	30	15	5	10	51	33	+18	50 (Note: Head-to-head points: CSKA 3, Dynamo 3. Head-to-head goal difference: CSKA +1, Dynamo -1.)	
7	Dynamo Moscow	30	15	5	10	44	33	+11	50	
8	Khimki	30	13	6	11	35	39	−4	45	

Source: Premier Liga
Rules for classification: 1) Points; 2) Head-to-head points; 3) Head-to-head matches won; 4) Head-to-head goal difference; 5) Head-to-head goals scored; 6) Matches won; 7) Goal difference; 8) Goals scored; 9) Play-off.

==== Results summary ====
Overall								Home						Away					
Pld	W	D	L	GF	GA	GD	Pts	W	D	L	GF	GA	GD	W	D	L	GF	GA	GD
30	15	5	10	52	32	+20	50	8	4	3	31	17	+14	7	1	7	21	15	+6

Last updated: 16 May 2021.
Source: Premier Liga

==== Results by round ====
Round	1	2	3	4	5	6	7	8	9	10	11	12	13	14	15	16	17	18	19	20	21	22	23	24	25	26	27	28	29	30
Ground	A	H	A	H	A	A	H	A	H	A	H	H	A	H	H	A	H	H	A	A	H	A	H	A	H	A	A	H	H	A
Result	W	W	L	L	D	W	W	W	L	W	W	W	W	W	D	L	D	D	W	L	W	L	L	W	W	L	L	D	W	L
Position	4	2	5	8	9	5	4	3	4	3	3	2	1	1	1	2	3	3	2	2	2	3	5	4	4	5	6	6	6	6

Updated to match(es) played on 16 May 2021. Source: Premier Liga
A = Away; H = Home; W = Win; D = Draw; L = Loss

==== Results ====
8 August 2020 1	Khimki	0 – 2	CSKA Moscow	Khimki
16:00 MSK (UTC+3)		Report	Kuchayev 18'; Dzagoev 45'	Stadium: Arena Khimki; Attendance: 4,948; Referee: Vladislav Bezborodov

15 August 2020 2	CSKA Moscow	2 – 1	Tambov	Moscow
18:00 MSK (UTC+3)	Kuchayev 29'; Shkurin 55'; Akinfeev (yellow card) 90+'	Report	Karapetian 42' (yellow card) 76'	Stadium: VEB Arena; Attendance: 7,939; Referee: Vladimir Moskalyov

19 August 2020 3	Zenit St.Petersburg	2 – 1	CSKA Moscow	Saint Petersburg
20:00 MSK (UTC+3)	Azmoun 19', 69' (yellow card) 59'	Report	Maradishvili (yellow card) 24'; Vlašić 26' (yellow card) 33'; Diveyev (yellow card) 34'; Oblyakov (yellow card) 90+4'	Stadium: Krestovsky Stadium; Attendance: 28,602; Referee: Vitali Meshkov

22 August 2020 4	CSKA Moscow	1 – 2	Rubin Kazan	Moscow
20:00 MSK (UTC+3)	Vlašić (yellow card) 9' (goal) 39'; Sigurðsson (yellow card) 17'	Report	Zuyev (yellow card) 32'; Bakayev 37'; Uremović (yellow card) 51'; Shatov (yellow card) 75'; Kvaratskhelia (yellow card) 79'; Makarov 90+'	Stadium: VEB Arena; Attendance: 7,731; Referee: Kirill Levnikov

26 August 2020 5	Krasnodar	1 – 1	CSKA Moscow	Krasnodar
20:30 MSK (UTC+3)	Berg (yellow card) 26'; Ramírez (yellow card) 78'; Wanderson 80'	Report	Kuchayev 28'; Maradishvili (yellow card) 53'; Tiknizyan (yellow card) 90+'	Stadium: Krasnodar Stadium; Attendance: 6,077; Referee: Vladislav Bezborodov

30 August 2020 6	Akhmat Grozny	0 – 3	CSKA Moscow	Grozny
18:00 MSK (UTC+3)	Semyonov (yellow card) 61'; Adamov (yellow card) 87'; Nižić (yellow card) 89'	Report	Kuchayev 11'; Tiknizyan (yellow card) 30'; Maradishvili (yellow card) 39'; Fernandes (yellow card) 49'; Chalov (yellow card) 52'; Diveyev (yellow card) 75'; Shchennikov (yellow card) 78'; Zaynutdinov (yellow card) 84'; Bistrović 88'; Vlašić 90'	Stadium: Akhmat-Arena; Attendance: 6,413; Referee: Sergey Ivanov

13 September 2020 7	CSKA Moscow	3 – 1	Spartak Moscow	Moscow
19:00 MSK (UTC+3)	Karpov (yellow card) 1'; Magnússon 30' (yellow card) 90+'; Vlašić 45+'; Ejuke 90+'; Shchennikov (yellow card) FT	Report	Ponce 11'; Maslov (yellow card) 29'; Ayrton (yellow card) 34'; Sobolev (yellow card) 58'; Urunov (yellow card) 90'	Stadium: VEB Arena; Attendance: 13,330; Referee: Sergei Karasev

20 September 2020 8	Ufa	0 – 1	CSKA Moscow	Ufa
14:00 MSK (UTC+3)	Bezdenezhnykh (yellow card) 32'; Carp (yellow card) 60'	Report	Maradishvili (yellow card) 16'; Bistrović 65' (yellow card) 89'	Stadium: Neftyanik Stadium; Attendance: 3,839; Referee: Nikolay Voloshin

27 September 2020 9	CSKA Moscow	0 – 1	Lokomotiv Moscow	Moscow
19:00 MSK (UTC+3)	Bistrović (yellow card) 8' (yellow-red card) 60'	Report	Smolov 45'; Eder (yellow card) 70'; Guilherme (yellow card) 85'	Stadium: VEB Arena; Attendance: 12,400; Referee: Mikhail Vilkov

3 October 2020 10	Ural Yekaterinburg	0 – 2	CSKA Moscow	Yekaterinburg
16:30 MSK (UTC+3)	Yemelyanov (yellow card) 40'; Kalinin (yellow card) 81'	Report	Magnússon (red card) 49'; Zaynutdinov 52'; Maradishvili 56' (yellow card) 79'; Oblyakov (yellow card) 72'; Tiknizyan (yellow card) 80'	Stadium: Central Stadium; Attendance: 15,102; Referee: Stanislav Vasiliev

18 October 2020 11	CSKA Moscow	3 – 1	Dynamo Moscow	Moscow
18:30 MSK (UTC+3)	Oblyakov (yellow card) 35'; Kuchayev 51'; Ejuke 54'; Diveyev 68'	Report	Grulyov (yellow card) 16'; Yevgenyev (yellow card) 40' (yellow-red card) 75'; Fomin (yellow card) 53'; Moro 57'	Stadium: VEB Arena; Attendance: 6,999; Referee: Vladislav Bezborodov

26 October 2020 12	CSKA Moscow	5 – 1	Arsenal Tula	Moscow
19:00 MSK (UTC+3)	Kuchayev (yellow card) 43'; Chalov 45+' (pen.); Vlašić 50', 58'; Sigurðsson 86'; Oblyakov 87'	Report	Grigalava (yellow card) 28'; Đorđević (yellow card) 31' (goal) 78'; Bauer (yellow card) 90'	Stadium: VEB Arena; Attendance: 5,092; Referee: Igor Panin

1 November 2020 13	Rotor Volgograd	0 – 1	CSKA Moscow	Volgograd
16:30 MSK (UTC+3)	Ponce (yellow card) 21'; Flamarion (yellow card) 44'	Report	Sigurðsson (yellow card) 32'; Dzagoev 41'; Tiknizyan (yellow card) 90+3'	Stadium: Volgograd Arena; Attendance: 14,250; Referee: Pavel Kukuyan

8 November 2020 14	CSKA Moscow	2 – 0	Rostov	Moscow
16:30 MSK (UTC+3)	Kuchayev 20'; Vasin (yellow card) 59'; Dzagoev (yellow card) 59'; Chalov 74'; Bistrović (yellow card) 90+1'	Report	Eremenko (penalty missed) 61'	Stadium: VEB Arena; Attendance: 6,886; Referee: Aleksei Matyunin

22 November 2020 15	CSKA Moscow	1 – 1	Sochi	Moscow
14:00 MSK (UTC+3)	Sigurðsson 5'; Maradishvili (yellow card) 69'; Akhmetov (yellow card) 71'; Gaich (yellow card) 90+'	Report	Burmistrov 23'; Joãozinho (yellow card) 32'; Yusupov (yellow card) 80'	Stadium: VEB Arena; Attendance: 5,012; Referee: Evgeny Kukulyak

29 November 2020 16	Rubin Kazan	1 – 0	CSKA Moscow	Kazan
16:30 MSK (UTC+3)	Makarov (yellow card) 13'; Jevtić (yellow card) 48'; Zotov (yellow card) 50'; Despotović 59' (yellow card) 59'; Samoshnikov (yellow card) 62'; Shatov (yellow card) 90+'; Klimov (yellow card) 90+'; Merkulov (yellow card) 90+'	Report	Diveyev (yellow card) 80'; Maradishvili (yellow card) 85'	Stadium: Ak Bars Arena; Attendance: 7,671; Referee: Vitali Meshkov

6 December 2020 17	CSKA Moscow	2 – 2	Khimki	Moscow
19:00 MSK (UTC+3)	Vlašić 40'; Shkurin 54'; Diveyev (yellow card) 70'	Report	Troshechkin (yellow card) 26'; Kuat (yellow card) 38'; Kukharchuk 47' (yellow card) 50'; Mirzov 51'	Stadium: VEB Arena; Attendance: 4,612; Referee: Kirill Levnikov

13 December 2020 18	CSKA Moscow	2 – 2	Ural Yekaterinburg	Moscow
19:00 MSK (UTC+3)	Zaynutdinov (yellow card) 5'; Shkurin 12' (red card) 90+'; Vlašić 61' (pen.); Fernandes (yellow card) 76'; Dzagoev (yellow card) 78'; Bistrović (yellow card) 88'; Oblyakov (yellow card) 90+'	Report	Yegorychev (yellow card) 16' (goal) 31'; Kalinin (yellow card) 22' (goal) 90'; Pogrebnyak (yellow card) 47' (yellow-red card) 47'	Stadium: VEB Arena; Attendance: 4,315; Referee: Alexey Sukhoi

17 December 2020 19	Rostov	1 – 3	CSKA Moscow	Rostov-on-Don
20:00 MSK (UTC+3)	Sukhomlinov (yellow card) 42'; Poloz (yellow card) 43'; Aleesami (yellow card) 70'; Kozlov 90+1'; Glebov (yellow card) 90+3'	Report	Akhmetov (yellow card) 5'; Chalov 2', 57', 82'; Fernandes (yellow card) 85'; Sigurðsson (yellow card) 90'; Vlašić (yellow card) 90+2'; Gaich (yellow card) 90+3'	Stadium: Rostov Arena; Attendance: 10,743; Referee: Vladimir Moskalyov

27 February 2021 20	Lokomotiv Moscow	2 – 0	CSKA Moscow	Moscow
19:00 MSK (UTC+3)	Lisakovich 6'; Krychowiak 41'; Rybus (yellow card) 90+'	Report	Vlašić (penalty missed) 73'	Stadium: RZD Arena; Attendance: 8,932; Referee: Pavel Kukuyan

6 March 2021 21	CSKA Moscow	2 – 0	Akhmat Grozny	Moscow
14:00 MSK (UTC+3)	Fernandes (yellow card) 27'; Rondón 39' (pen.); Vlašić 52'; Tiknizyan (yellow card) 90+'	Report	Bogosavac (yellow card) 21'; Berisha (yellow card) 35'; Shelia (yellow card) 53'; Nenakhov (yellow card) 67'; Shvets (yellow card) 80'	Stadium: VEB Arena; Attendance: 6,085; Referee: Ivan Sidenkov

13 March 2021 22	Arsenal Tula	2 – 1	CSKA Moscow	Tula
14:00 MSK (UTC+3)	Zaynutdinov (yellow card) 40'; Diveyev (yellow card) 80'; Tiknizyan 90' (yellow card) 90+'	Report	Panteleyev 42' (pen.); Lomovitsky 45'; Bauer (yellow card) 63'; Dovbnya (yellow card) 83' (yellow-red card) 90+'; Gromyko (yellow card) 89' (yellow-red card) 90+'	Stadium: Arsenal Stadium; Attendance: 9,890; Referee: Vladislav Bezborodov

17 March 2021 23	CSKA Moscow	2 – 3	Zenit St.Petersburg	Moscow
20:00 MSK (UTC+3)	Rondón 28'; Akinfeev (yellow card) 45'; Akhmetov (red card) 53'; Vlašić 90+' (pen.)	Report	Dzyuba 33' (penalty missed) 45; Wendel 50', 77'	Stadium: VEB Arena; Attendance: 11,275; Referee: Evgeny Kukulyak

4 April 2021 24	Tambov	1 – 2	CSKA Moscow	Saransk
16:30 MSK (UTC+3)	Karapuzov (yellow card) 7'; Arkhipov 16' (pen.) (yellow card) 63'; Klimov (yellow card) 17'; Carp (yellow card) 45'; Bavin (yellow card) 51'	Report	Vlašić 26' (pen.) (penalty missed) 64; Rondón 52' (pen.); Bohinen (yellow card) 54'	Stadium: Mordovia Arena; Attendance: 7,540; Referee: Vitali Meshkov
Note: Match played at the Mordovia Arena in Saransk instead of Tambov's regular Spartak Stadium.

12 April 2021 25	CSKA Moscow	2 – 0	Rotor Volgograd	Moscow
19:00 MSK (UTC+3)	Ejuke 45+1'; Rondón 70'; Akhmetov (yellow card) 89'	Report		Stadium: VEB Arena; Attendance: 10,240; Referee: Sergei Karasev

18 April 2021 26	Sochi	2 – 1	CSKA Moscow	Sochi
16:30 MSK (UTC+3)	Noboa 40' (pen.); Burmistrov (yellow card) 50'; Yusupov 55'; Mevlja (yellow card) 77'; N.Zabolotny (yellow card) 85'; Dugandžić (yellow card) 88'	Report	Diveyev 79'; Sigurðsson (yellow card) 81'; Dzagoev (yellow card) 90+1'	Stadium: Fisht Olympic Stadium; Attendance: 10,767; Referee: Stanislav Vasiliev

25 April 2021 27	Spartak Moscow	1 – 0	CSKA Moscow	Moscow
16:30 MSK (UTC+3)	Larsson 52'; Ayrton (yellow card) 62'; Maksimenko (yellow card) 88'; Moses (yellow card) 90+'; Umyarov (yellow card) 90+'	Report	Akhmetov (red card) 37'; Dzagoev (yellow card) 53'; Maradishvili (yellow card) 64'	Stadium: Otkritie Arena; Attendance: 11,974; Referee: Pavel Kukuyan

1 May 2021 28	CSKA Moscow	1 – 1	Ufa	Moscow
16:30 MSK (UTC+3)	Chalov 71'	Report	Mrzljak (yellow card) 64' (goal) 66'; Golubev (yellow card) 88'; Urunov (yellow card) 89'; Krotov (yellow card) 90+'	Stadium: VEB Arena; Attendance: 10,155; Referee: Vasily Kazartsev

8 May 2021 29	CSKA Moscow	3 – 1	Krasnodar	Moscow
19:30 MSK (UTC+3)	Ejuke 32'; Diveyev (yellow card) 50'; Chalov 56'; Fernandes 69'	Report	Claesson 26' (yellow card) 58'; Gazinsky (yellow card) 42'; Kaio (yellow card) 75'; Vilhena (yellow card) 77'	Stadium: VEB Arena; Attendance: 10,704; Referee: Vitali Meshkov

16 May 2021 30	Dynamo Moscow	3 – 2	CSKA Moscow	Moscow
14:00 MSK (UTC+3)	Varela (yellow card) 32'; Neustädter (yellow card) 43'; Grulyov 65', 72'; Yevgenyev (yellow card) 68'; Kaboré (yellow card) 85'; Zakharyan 89'	Report	Tiknizyan 18' (yellow card) 33'; Vasin (yellow card) 30'; Ejuke 79'; Shchennikov (yellow card) 90+'	Stadium: VTB Arena; Attendance: 12,533; Referee: Kirill Levnikov

=== Russian Cup ===
21 February 2021 Round of 16	CSKA Moscow	2 – 0	SKA-Khabarovsk	Moscow
14:30 MSK (UTC+3)	Akhmetov 39'; Vlašić 66'	Report	Bragin (red card) 50'; Nazarov (yellow card) 80'	Stadium: VEB Arena; Attendance: 4,341; Referee: Vasily Kazartsev

8 April 2021 Quarterfinal	Arsenal Tula	1 – 2	CSKA Moscow	Tula
19:30 MSK (UTC+3)	Lutsenko (yellow card) 21' (yellow-red card) 55' (goal) 33'; Panchenko (yellow card) 47'; Lomovitsky (yellow card) 71'	Report	Shchennikov (yellow card) 23'; Karpov 48'; Fernandes 86'; Tiknizyan (yellow card) 90'	Stadium: Arsenal Stadium; Attendance: 9,123; Referee: Mikhail Vilkov

21 April 2021 Semifinal	Lokomotiv Moscow	3 – 0	CSKA Moscow	Moscow
19:00 MSK (UTC+3)	Kamano 16'; Smolov 54'; Pablo (yellow card) 63'; Krychowiak (yellow card) 64' (goal) 90+1'; Barinov (yellow card) 66'	Report	Diveyev (yellow card) 90+'	Stadium: RZD Arena; Attendance: 11,017; Referee: Sergei Karasev

=== UEFA Europa League ===
==== Group stage ====
Pos	Team	Pld	W	D	L	GF	GA	GD	Pts	Qualification
1	(Croatia) Dinamo Zagreb	6	4	2	0	9	1	+8	14	Advance to knockout phase
2	(Austria) Wolfsberger AC	6	3	1	2	7	6	+1	10	Advance to knockout phase
3	(Netherlands) Feyenoord	6	1	2	3	4	8	−4	5	
4	(Russia) CSKA Moscow	6	0	3	3	3	8	−5	3	

Source: UEFA
Rules for classification: Group stage tiebreakers

22 October 2020 1	Wolfsberger AC (Austria)	1–1	(Russia) CSKA Moscow	Klagenfurt, Austria
22:00 MSK (UTC+3)	Wernitznig (yellow card) 10'; Liendl 42' (pen.)	Report	Gaich 5'; Vlašić (yellow card) 18'; Tiknizyan (yellow card) 28'; Vasin (yellow card) 41'; Zaynutdinov (yellow card) 50'; Oblyakov (yellow card) 50'; Ejuke (yellow card) 53'	Stadium: Wörthersee Stadion; Attendance: 3,000; Referee: Sascha Stegemann (Germany)
Note: Match played at the Wörthersee Stadion, Klagenfurt instead of Wolfsberger AC's regular Lavanttal-Arena in Wolfsberg

29 October 2020 2	CSKA Moscow (Russia)	0–0	(Croatia) Dinamo Zagreb	Moscow, Russia
20:55 MSK (UTC+3)		Report	Petković (yellow card) 61'; Jakić (yellow card) 90+1'	Stadium: VEB Arena; Attendance: 6,411; Referee: Radu Petrescu (Romania)

5 November 2020 3	Feyenoord (Netherlands)	3–1	(Russia) CSKA Moscow	Rotterdam, Netherlands
23:00 MSK (UTC+3)	Haps 63'; Kökçü 71'; Geertruida 72'; Malacia (yellow card) 85'; Berghuis (yellow card) 90+2'	Report	Zaynutdinov (yellow card) 15'; Magnússon (yellow card) 68'; Senesi 80' (o.g.)	Stadium: De Kuip; Attendance: 0 Referee: Roi Reinshreiber (Israel)
Note: Match played behind closed doors.

26 November 2020 4	CSKA Moscow (Russia)	0–0	(Netherlands) Feyenoord	Moscow, Russia
20:55 MSK (UTC+3)	Oblyakov (yellow card) 28'; Akhmetov (yellow card) 71'	Report	Jørgensen (yellow card) 43' (yellow-red card) 48'; Senesi (yellow card) 66'; Nieuwkoop (yellow card) 90'	Stadium: VEB Arena; Attendance: 5,407; Referee: Kristo Tohver (Estonia)

3 December 2020 5	CSKA Moscow (Russia)	0–1	(Austria) Wolfsberger AC	Moscow, Russia
20:55 MSK (UTC+3)		Report	Vizinger 22'; Baumgartner (yellow card) 67'; Peretz (yellow card) 86'; Kofler (yellow card) 90+1'	Stadium: VEB Arena; Attendance: 4,321; Referee: Nikola Dabanović (Montenegro)

10 December 2020 6	Dinamo Zagreb (Croatia)	3–1	(Russia) CSKA Moscow	Zagreb, Croatia
23:00 MSK (UTC+3)	Gavranović (yellow card) 2'; Gvardiol 25'; Oršić 41'; Kastrati 75'; Franjić (yellow card) 81'	Report	Oblyakov (yellow card) 41'; Vasin (yellow card) 51'; Bistrović 76'; Gaich (yellow card) 85'	Stadium: Stadion Maksimir; Attendance: 0 Referee: Tiago Martins (Portugal)
Note: Match played behind closed doors.

== Squad statistics ==
As of match played 16 May 2021

=== Appearances and goals ===
No.	Pos	Nat	Player	Total		Premier League		Russian Cup		Europa League	
No.	Pos	Nat	Player	Apps	Goals	Apps	Goals	Apps	Goals	Apps	Goals
1	GK	(Russia) RUS	Ilya Pomazun	2	0	2	0	0	0	0	0
2	DF	(Russia) RUS	Mário Fernandes	27	2	23	1	2	1	2	0
3	DF	(Brazil) BRA	Bruno Fuchs	1	0	0+1	0	0	0	0	0
5	DF	(Russia) RUS	Viktor Vasin	17	0	10+3	0	1	0	2+1	0
7	MF	(Russia) RUS	Ilzat Akhmetov	22	1	8+6	0	2+1	1	2+3	0
8	MF	(Croatia) CRO	Nikola Vlašić	34	12	26	11	3	1	5	0
9	FW	(Russia) RUS	Fyodor Chalov	36	7	13+14	7	1+2	0	3+3	0
10	MF	(Russia) RUS	Alan Dzagoev	22	2	11+4	2	2+1	0	1+3	0
11	FW	(Nigeria) NGR	Chidera Ejuke	32	5	18+7	5	2+1	0	2+2	0
14	DF	(Russia) RUS	Kirill Nababkin	3	0	3	0	0	0	0	0
17	MF	(Iceland) ISL	Arnór Sigurðsson	31	2	10+13	2	2+1	0	3+2	0
19	MF	(Kazakhstan) KAZ	Baktiyar Zaynutdinov	25	1	14+4	1	1	0	6	0
20	MF	(Russia) RUS	Konstantin Kuchayev	25	6	18+3	6	0	0	4	0
22	MF	(Russia) RUS	Konstantin Maradishvili	35	1	24+2	1	2+1	0	6	0
23	DF	(Iceland) ISL	Hörður Magnússon	28	1	21+1	1	1	0	5	0
32	FW	(Venezuela) VEN	Salomón Rondón	13	4	9+1	4	1+2	0	0	0
35	GK	(Russia) RUS	Igor Akinfeev	37	0	28	0	3	0	6	0
42	DF	(Russia) RUS	Georgi Shchennikov	28	0	20+2	0	3	0	3	0
46	FW	(Russia) RUS	Vladislav Yakovlev	2	0	0+2	0	0	0	0	0
62	DF	(Russia) RUS	Vadim Karpov	14	1	10+2	0	1	1	0+1	0
71	MF	(Russia) RUS	Nair Tiknizyan	34	2	8+20	2	0+1	0	1+4	0
78	DF	(Russia) RUS	Igor Diveyev	32	2	23	2	3	0	6	0
88	MF	(Norway) NOR	Emil Bohinen	4	0	2+2	0	0	0	0	0
98	MF	(Russia) RUS	Ivan Oblyakov	36	1	23+4	1	2+1	0	6	0
99	FW	(Belarus) BLR	Ilya Shkurin	14	3	3+6	3	1+2	0	1+1	0
Players away from the club on loan:
21	FW	(Argentina) ARG	Adolfo Gaich	18	1	2+11	0	0	0	1+4	1
25	MF	(Croatia) CRO	Kristijan Bistrović	20	3	1+13	2	0	0	1+5	1
29	MF	(Slovenia) SLO	Jaka Bijol	5	0	0+5	0	0	0	0	0
Players who left CSKA Moscow during the season:

=== Goal scorers ===
Place	Position	Nation	Number	Name	Premier League	Russian Cup	Europa League	Total
1	MF	(Croatia)	8	Nikola Vlašić	11	1	0	12
2	FW	(Russia)	9	Fyodor Chalov	7	0	0	7
3	MF	(Russia)	20	Konstantin Kuchayev	6	0	0	6
4	FW	(Nigeria)	11	Chidera Ejuke	5	0	0	5
5	FW	(Venezuela)	32	Salomón Rondón	4	0	0	4
6	FW	(Belarus)	99	Ilya Shkurin	3	0	0	3
6	MF	(Croatia)	25	Kristijan Bistrović	2	0	1	3
8	MF	(Russia)	10	Alan Dzagoev	2	0	0	2
8	MF	(Iceland)	17	Arnór Sigurðsson	2	0	0	2
8	DF	(Russia)	78	Igor Diveyev	2	0	0	2
8	MF	(Russia)	71	Nair Tiknizyan	2	0	0	2
8	DF	(Russia)	2	Mário Fernandes	1	1	0	2
11	DF	(Iceland)	23	Hörður Magnússon	1	0	0	1
11	MF	(Kazakhstan)	19	Baktiyar Zaynutdinov	1	0	0	1
11	MF	(Russia)	22	Konstantin Maradishvili	1	0	0	1
11	MF	(Russia)	98	Ivan Oblyakov	1	0	0	1
11	MF	(Russia)	7	Ilzat Akhmetov	0	1	0	1
11	DF	(Russia)	62	Vadim Karpov	0	1	0	1
11	FW	(Argentina)	21	Adolfo Gaich	0	0	1	1
11				Own goal	0	0	1	1
				TOTALS	51	4	3	58

=== Clean sheets ===
Place	Position	Nation	Number	Name	Premier League	Russian Cup	Europa League	Total
1	GK	(Russia)	35	Igor Akinfeev	7	1	2	10
2	GK	(Russia)	1	Ilya Pomazun	1	0	0	1
				TOTALS	8	1	2	11

=== Disciplinary record ===
Number	Nation	Position	Name	Premier League		Russian Cup		Europa League		Total	
Number	Nation	Position	Name	Booked	Sent off (straight red)	Booked	Sent off (straight red)	Booked	Sent off (straight red)	Booked	Sent off (straight red)
2	(Russia)	DF	Mário Fernandes	4	0	0	0	0	0	4	0
5	(Russia)	DF	Viktor Vasin	2	0	0	0	2	0	4	0
7	(Russia)	MF	Ilzat Akhmetov	3	2	0	0	1	0	4	2
8	(Croatia)	MF	Nikola Vlašić	3	0	0	0	1	0	4	0
9	(Russia)	FW	Fyodor Chalov	1	0	0	0	0	0	1	0
10	(Russia)	MF	Alan Dzagoev	4	0	0	0	0	0	4	0
11	(Nigeria)	FW	Chidera Ejuke	0	0	0	0	1	0	1	0
17	(Iceland)	MF	Arnór Sigurðsson	4	0	0	0	0	0	4	0
19	(Kazakhstan)	MF	Baktiyar Zaynutdinov	3	0	0	0	2	0	5	0
20	(Russia)	MF	Konstantin Kuchayev	1	0	0	0	0	0	1	0
22	(Russia)	MF	Konstantin Maradishvili	8	0	0	0	0	0	8	0
23	(Iceland)	DF	Hörður Magnússon	1	1	0	0	1	0	2	1
35	(Russia)	GK	Igor Akinfeev	2	0	0	0	0	0	2	0
42	(Russia)	DF	Georgi Shchennikov	3	0	1	0	0	0	4	0
62	(Russia)	DF	Vadim Karpov	1	0	0	0	0	0	1	0
71	(Russia)	MF	Nair Tiknizyan	7	0	1	0	1	0	9	0
78	(Russia)	DF	Igor Diveyev	6	0	1	0	0	0	7	0
88	(Norway)	MF	Emil Bohinen	1	0	0	0	0	0	1	0
98	(Russia)	MF	Ivan Oblyakov	4	0	0	0	3	0	7	0
99	(Belarus)	FW	Ilya Shkurin	0	1	0	0	0	0	0	1
Players away on loan:
21	(Argentina)	FW	Adolfo Gaich	2	0	0	0	1	0	3	0
25	(Croatia)	MF	Kristijan Bistrović	5	1	0	0	0	0	5	1
Players who left CSKA Moscow during the season:
			TOTALS	65	5	3	0	13	0	81	5
