= Gocha Gogrichiani =

Gocha Gogrichiani may refer to:

- Gocha Gogrichiani (footballer, born 1964)
- Gocha Gogrichiani (footballer, born 2000)
