= Lassana N'Diaye =

Malian footballer

Personal information
- Full name: Lassana N'Diaye
- Date of birth: 3 October 2000 (age 26)
- Place of birth: Bamako, Mali
- Height: 1.80 m (5 ft 11 in)
- Position: Striker

Youth career
- Guidars
- 2018–2020: CSKA Moscow

Senior career*
Years	Team	Apps	(Gls)
2020–2023	CSKA Moscow	0	(0)
2020	→ AFC Eskilstuna (loan)	6	(0)
2021	→ Veles Moscow (loan)	12	(2)
2021–2022	→ Tekstilshchik Ivanovo (loan)	14	(2)
2022	→ Arda Kardzhali (loan)	0	(0)
2022–2023	→ Arda Kardzhali (loan)	35	(8)
2023	Radnički Niš	1	(0)
2024	Botev Vratsa	10	(1)
2024–2025	Kapaz	13	(1)
2025	Mesaimeer	1	(0)

International career^{‡}
- Mali U17
- Mali U20
- * Club domestic league appearances and goals as of 15 January 2025 ‡ National team caps and goals as of 12:44, 8 October 2018 (UTC)

Lassana N'Diaye (born 3 October 2000) is a Malian professional footballer who plays as a striker.

== Club career ==
Born in Bamako, after playing for Guidars, N'Diaye turned professional with Russian club CSKA Moscow in October 2018. In August 2020 he moved on loan to Swedish club AFC Eskilstuna. In February 2021 he moved on loan to Veles Moscow. On 7 September 2021, he was loaned to Tekstilshchik Ivanovo for the 2021–22 season. On 3 February 2022, the loan to Tekstilschik was terminated early. On 17 February 2022, N'Diaye joined Arda Kardzhali in Bulgaria on loan until the end of the season. On 8 July 2022, N'Diaye extended his CSKA contract throughout the 2023–24 season and returned to Arda on another loan for the 2022–23 season.

On 15 September 2023, CSKA Moscow announced N'Diaye's transfer to Radnički Niš in Serbia. He then played for Botev Vratsa.

In July 2024, N'Diaye joined Azerbaijan Premier League club Kapaz on an initial one-year deal. On 27 January 2025, N'Diaye left Kapaz.

On 3 February 2025, Qatari Second Division club Mesaimeer announced the signing of N'Diaye.

== International career ==
He represented Mali under-17s at the 2017 FIFA U-17 World Cup, finishing the tournament as the second-highest scorer. He has also played for Mali under-20s, and represented them at the 2019 FIFA U-20 World Cup.

== Playing style ==
He models himself on Samuel Eto'o.

== Career statistics ==
As of match played 4 February 2025

Appearances and goals by club, season and competition
Club	Season	League			Cup		Europe		Other		Total	
Club	Season	Division	Apps	Goals	Apps	Goals	Apps	Goals	Apps	Goals	Apps	Goals
CSKA Moscow	2020–21	Russian Premier League	0	0	0	0	0	0	0	0	0	0
CSKA Moscow	2021–22	Russian Premier League	0	0	0	0	0	0	0	0	0	0
CSKA Moscow	2022–23	Russian Premier League	0	0	0	0	0	0	0	0	0	0
CSKA Moscow	Total		0	0	0	10	0	0	0	0	0	0
AFC Eskilstuna (loan)	2020	Superettan	6	0	—		—		—		6	0
Veles Moscow (loan)	2020–21	Russian First League	12	2	—		—		—		12	2
Tekstilshchik Ivanovo (loan)	2021–22	Russian First League	13	2	—		—		—		13	2
Arda Kardzhali (loan)	2022–23	Bulgarian First League	35	8	3	1	—		—		38	9
Radnički Niš	2023–24	Serbian SuperLiga	1	0	1	0	—		—		2	0
Botev Vratsa	2023–24	Bulgarian First League	10	0	0	0	—		1	0	11	1
Kapaz	2024–25	Azerbaijan Premier League	13	1	0	0	—		—		13	1
Mesaimeer	2024-25	Qatari Second Division	1	0	0	0	—		—		1	0
Career total			91	13	4	1	0	0	1	0	96	14
