= Nikita Kotin =

Russian football player

Personal information
- Full name: Nikita Andreyevich Kotin
- Date of birth: 1 September 2002 (age 24)
- Place of birth: Samara, Russia
- Height: 1.88 m (6 ft 2 in)
- Position: Defender

Team information
- Current team: Shinnik Yaroslavl
- Number: 53

Youth career
- 2008–2019: Krylia Sovetov Samara

Senior career*
Years	Team	Apps	(Gls)
2020–2021	CSKA Moscow	0	(0)
2021	→ Irtysh Omsk (loan)	4	(0)
2021–2025	Rostov	0	(0)
2022–2023	→ Sokol Saratov (loan)	28	(2)
2023–2024	→ Shinnik Yaroslavl (loan)	28	(1)
2024	→ Dynamo Makhachkala (loan)	1	(0)
2025	→ Shinnik Yaroslavl (loan)	5	(0)
2025–	Shinnik Yaroslavl	22	(0)

International career^{‡}
2018	Russia U-16	7	(0)
2018–2019	Russia U-17	13	(2)
2019	Russia U-18	5	(0)
- * Club domestic league appearances and goals as of 16 May 2026 ‡ National team caps and goals as of 18 November 2019

Nikita Andreyevich Kotin (Russian: Никита Андреевич Котин; born 1 September 2002) is a Russian football player who plays for Shinnik Yaroslavl.

== Club career ==
He was raised in the youth teams of Krylia Sovetov Samara and was first included in their Russian Premier League roster in the 2018–19 season, but was never called up to the senior team.

In early 2020 he moved to CSKA Moscow on a 3.5-year contract. He appeared on the bench in most of their senior squad games in that year, but did not appear on the field. On 25 February 2021, he was loaned to Russian Football National League club Irtysh Omsk until the end of the season.

He made his debut in the FNL for Irtysh on 6 March 2021 in a game against Alania Vladikavkaz.

On 1 July 2021, his contract with CSKA was terminated by mutual consent.

On 30 June 2022, Kotin joined Sokol Saratov on a season-long loan from Rostov. On 5 July 2023, Kotin moved on a new season-long loan to Shinnik Yaroslavl.

On 16 July 2024, he was loaned to Dynamo Makhachkala. Kotin made his Russian Premier League debut for Dynamo Makhachkala on 26 October 2024 against Akron Tolyatti. On 12 February 2025, Kotin returned to Shinnik Yaroslavl on a new loan.

== International career ==
He represented Russia in all 3 games at the 2019 UEFA European Under-17 Championship. Russia lost all the games and was eliminated at group stage.

== Career statistics ==
As of match played 24 May 2025

Appearances and goals by club, season and competition
Club	Season	League			Cup		Continental		Total	
Club	Season	Division	Apps	Goals	Apps	Goals	Apps	Goals	Apps	Goals
CSKA Moscow	2019–20	Russian Premier League	0	0	0	0	—		0	0
CSKA Moscow	2020–21	Russian Premier League	0	0	0	0	0	0	0	0
CSKA Moscow	Total		0	0	0	0	0	0	0	0
Irtysh Omsk	2020–21	Russian First League	4	0	—		—		4	0
Rostov	2021–22	Russian Premier League	0	0	1	0	—		1	0
Sokol Saratov (loan)	2022–23	Russian Second League	28	2	0	0	—		28	2
Shinnik Yaroslavl (loan)	2023–24	Russian First League	28	1	0	0	—		28	1
Dynamo Makhachkala (loan)	2024–25	Russian Premier League	1	0	4	0	—		5	0
Shinnik Yaroslavl (loan)	2024–25	Russian First League	5	0	0	0	—		5	0
Career total			66	3	5	0	0	0	71	3
