= Chidera Ejuke =

Nigerian footballer (born 1998)

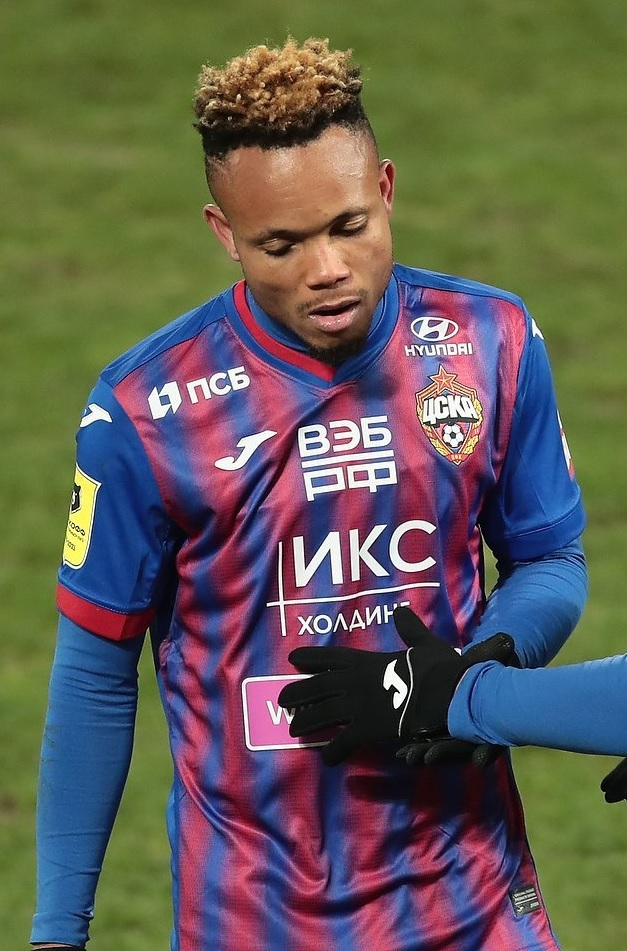
- Ejuke with CSKA Moscow in 2020

Personal information
- Date of birth: 2 January 1998 (age 28)
- Place of birth: Zaria, Nigeria
- Height: 1.76 m (5 ft 9 in)
- Position: Winger

Team information
- Current team: Sevilla
- Number: 21

Youth career
- Supreme Court FC

Senior career*
Years	Team	Apps	(Gls)
2016	Gombe United	6	(0)
2017–2019	Vålerenga	59	(13)
2019–2020	Heerenveen	25	(9)
2020–2024	CSKA Moscow	55	(10)
2022–2023	→ Hertha BSC (loan)	20	(0)
2023–2024	→ Royal Antwerp (loan)	29	(4)
2024–	Sevilla	52	(3)

International career^{‡}
2015	Nigeria U17	5	(0)
2017	Nigeria U20	3	(0)
2020–	Nigeria	14	(1)
Medal record
Men's football
Representing Nigeria
Africa Cup of Nations
Third place	2025 Morocco
- * Club domestic league appearances and goals as of 27 May 2026 ‡ National team caps and goals as of 27 March 2026

Chidera Ejuke (born 2 January 1998) is a Nigerian professional footballer who plays as a winger for La Liga club Sevilla and the Nigeria national team.

== Club career ==
In March 2017, Ejuke signed a three-year contract with Eliteserien side Vålerenga. In July 2019, he moved to the Netherlands to play for SC Heerenveen, ignoring interest from clubs as Besiktas JK and Lazio.

=== CSKA Moscow ===
On 28 August 2020, CSKA Moscow announced the signing of Ejuke from Heerenveen on a four-year contract.

On 30 September 2020, He scored the third goal in a 3–1 derby win over Spartak Moscow.

==== Loan to Hertha BSC ====
On 3 July 2022, Ejuke suspended his contract with CSKA Moscow for the 2022–23 season, having taken advantage of the FIFA ruling relating to the Russian invasion of Ukraine. On 13 July 2022, he joined Hertha BSC in Germany for the 2022–23 season, He came on in the 56th minute of Hertha Berlins 3–1 loss to Union Berlin for his debut on 6 August 2022.

==== Loan to Royal Antwerp ====
On 5 July 2023, Ejuke suspended his contract with CSKA for the 2023–24 season under the FIFA regulations.

On 30 July 2023, Belgian champions Royal Antwerp announced the signing of Ejuke on a one-year deal. The club referred that an exemption from FIFA for players active in Russia allowed the deal to happen.

=== Sevilla ===
On 17 June 2024, Ejuke signed for Spanish club Sevilla following the expiration of his contract at CSKA Moscow.

== International career ==
Ejuke debuted for the Nigeria national team in a friendly 1–1 tie with Tunisia on 13 October 2020. He came on as a substitute for Samuel Chukwueze, and the match ended in a 1–1 draw.

In December 2021, Ejuke was selected by coach Gernot Rohr to take part in the 2021 Africa Cup of Nations.

On 11 December 2025, Ejuke was called up to the Nigeria squad for the 2025 Africa Cup of Nations.

== Career statistics ==
=== Club ===
As of match played 23 May 2026

Appearances and goals by club, season and competition
Club	Season	League			National cup		Europe		Total	
Club	Season	Division	Apps	Goals	Apps	Goals	Apps	Goals	Apps	Goals
Vålerenga	2017	Eliteserien	16	4	5	1	—		21	5
Vålerenga	2018	Eliteserien	29	3	3	0	—		32	3
Vålerenga	2019	Eliteserien	14	6	2	1	—		16	7
Vålerenga	Total		59	13	10	2	—		69	15
Heerenveen	2019–20	Eredivisie	25	9	4	1	—		29	10
CSKA Moscow	2020–21	Russian Premier League	25	5	3	0	5 (Note: Appearances in UEFA Europa League)	0	33	5
CSKA Moscow	2021–22	Russian Premier League	30	5	2	0	—		32	5
CSKA Moscow	Total		55	10	5	0	5	0	65	10
Hertha BSC (loan)	2022–23	Bundesliga	20	0	1	0	—		21	0
Royal Antwerp (loan)	2023–24	Belgian Pro League	29	4	6	1	4 (Note: Appearances in UEFA Champions League)	0	39	5
Sevilla	2024–25	La Liga	25	2	0	0	—		25	2
Sevilla	2025–26	La Liga	27	1	2	0	—		29	1
Sevilla	Total		52	3	2	0	—		54	3
Career total			240	40	28	4	9	0	277	43

=== International ===
As of match played 27 March 2026

Appearances and goals by national team and year
National team	Year	Apps	Goals
Nigeria	2020	1	0
Nigeria	2021	3	0
Nigeria	2022	4	0
Nigeria	2025	4	1
Nigeria	2026	2	0
Total		14	1

Scores and results list Nigeria's goal tally first, score column indicates score after each Ejuke goal.

List of international goals scored by Chidera Ejuke
No.	Date	Venue	Opponent	Score	Result	Competition
1	13 November 2025	Moulay Hassan Stadium, Rabat, Morocco	Gabon	2–1	4–1 (a.e.t.)	2026 FIFA World Cup qualification

== Honours ==
Nigeria

- Africa Cup of Nations third place: 2025

Individual

- Eredivisie Talent of the Month: September 2019
