= Vadim Karpov =

Russian footballer

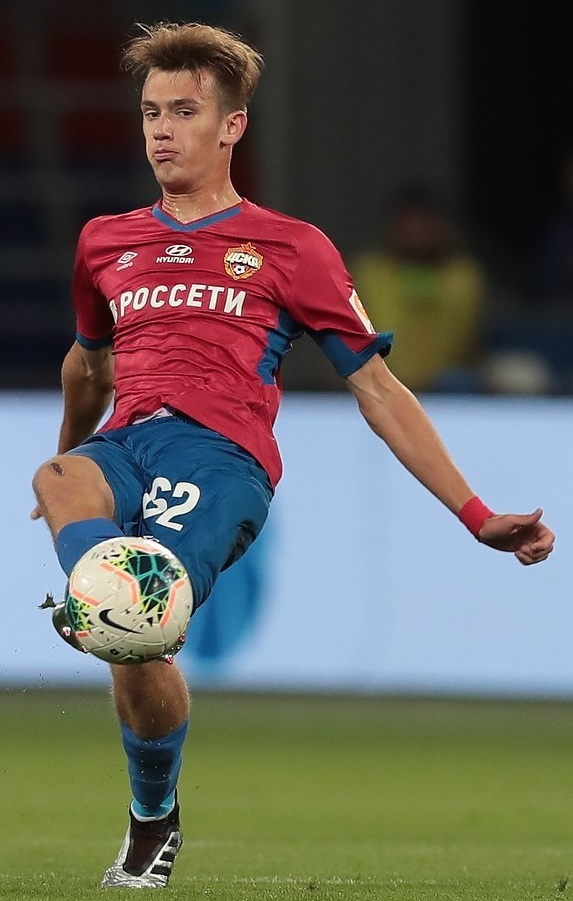
- Karpov with CSKA Moscow in 2019

Personal information
- Full name: Vadim Yuryevich Karpov
- Date of birth: 14 July 2002 (age 24)
- Place of birth: Kotlas, Russia
- Height: 1.90 m (6 ft 3 in)
- Position: Defender

Team information
- Current team: Shinnik Yaroslavl
- Number: 62

Youth career
- 2009–2010: Zenit St. Petersburg
- 2010–2017: SShOR Zenit Saint-Petersburg
- 2017–2019: CSKA Moscow

Senior career*
Years	Team	Apps	(Gls)
2019–2024	CSKA Moscow	25	(0)
2021–2022	→ Tekstilshchik Ivanovo (loan)	17	(0)
2023–2024	→ Ufa (loan)	23	(0)
2024–2025	Ufa	29	(0)
2025–	Shinnik Yaroslavl	21	(0)

International career^{‡}
2017–2018	Russia U-16	13	(0)
2018–2019	Russia U-17	7	(0)
2021	Russia U-21	2	(0)
- * Club domestic league appearances and goals as of 16 May 2026 ‡ National team caps and goals as of 6 June 2021

Vadim Yuryevich Karpov (Russian: Вадим Юрьевич Карпов; born 14 July 2002) is a Russian football player who plays as centre-back for Shinnik Yaroslavl.

== Club career ==
Karpov made his debut for CSKA Moscow on 19 September 2019 in a Europa League game against Ludogorets Razgrad at the age of 17. He was put into the main squad's starting lineup as 5 other defenders were injured. The game ended in a 1–5 loss for CSKA.

In their next game on 22 September 2019, he made his Russian Premier League debut in a 3–2 victory over Krasnodar.

On 7 September 2021, CSKA announced that Karpov joined Tekstilshchik Ivanovo on loan for the 2021–22 season.

On 13 July 2024, Karpov moved to Ufa after playing at the club on loan in the 2023–24 season.

== Career statistics ==
=== Club ===
As of match played 16 May 2026

Appearances and goals by club, season and competition
Club	Season	League			National Cup		Continental		Total	
Club	Season	Division	Apps	Goals	Apps	Goals	Apps	Goals	Apps	Goals
CSKA Moscow	2019–20	Russian Premier League	13	0	1	0	5 (Note: Appearances in the UEFA Europa League)	0	19	0
CSKA Moscow	2020–21	Russian Premier League	12	0	1	1	1	0	14	1
CSKA Moscow	2021–22	Russian Premier League	0	0	–		–		0	0
CSKA Moscow	2022–23	Russian Premier League	0	0	0	0	–		0	0
CSKA Moscow	2023–24	Russian Premier League	0	0	0	0	–		0	0
CSKA Moscow	Total		25	0	2	1	6	0	33	1
Tekstilshchik Ivanovo (loan)	2021–22	Russian First League	17	0	–		–		17	0
Ufa (loan)	2023–24	Russian Second League A	23	0	2	0	–		25	0
Ufa	2024–25	Russian First League	29	0	2	0	–		31	0
Shinnik Yaroslavl	2025–26	Russian First League	21	0	2	0	–		23	0
Career total			115	0	8	1	6	0	129	1
