= Dmitry Kaptilovich =

Russian footballer

Personal information
- Full name: Dmitry Andreyevich Kaptilovich
- Date of birth: 22 February 2003 (age 23)
- Height: 1.86 m (6 ft 1 in)
- Position: Defender

Team information
- Current team: Spartak Kostroma
- Number: 17

Youth career
- CSKA Moscow

Senior career*
Years	Team	Apps	(Gls)
2021–2023	CSKA Moscow	0	(0)
2023	Zvezda St. Petersburg	10	(0)
2024	Zvezda St. Petersburg	0	(0)
2024–2025	Spartak Kostroma	23	(0)
2025–2026	Chayka Peschanokopskoye	15	(0)
2026–	Spartak Kostroma	0	(0)
- * Club domestic league appearances and goals as of 16 May 2026

Dmitry Andreyevich Kaptilovich (Russian: Дмитрий Андреевич Каптилович; born 22 February 2003) is a Russian football player who plays for Spartak Kostroma.

== Club career ==
He made his debut for the main team of CSKA Moscow on 23 September 2021 in a Russian Cup game against Zenit-Izhevsk.

== Career statistics ==
As of 26 November 2022

Club	Season	League			Cup		Continental		Other		Total	
Club	Season	Division	Apps	Goals	Apps	Goals	Apps	Goals	Apps	Goals	Apps	Goals
CSKA Moscow	2021–22	RPL	0	0	2	0	–		–		2	0
CSKA Moscow	2022–23	RPL	0	0	0	0	–		–		0	0
Career total			0	0	2	0	0	0	0	0	2	0
