= Konstantin Maradishvili =

Russian footballer (born 2000)

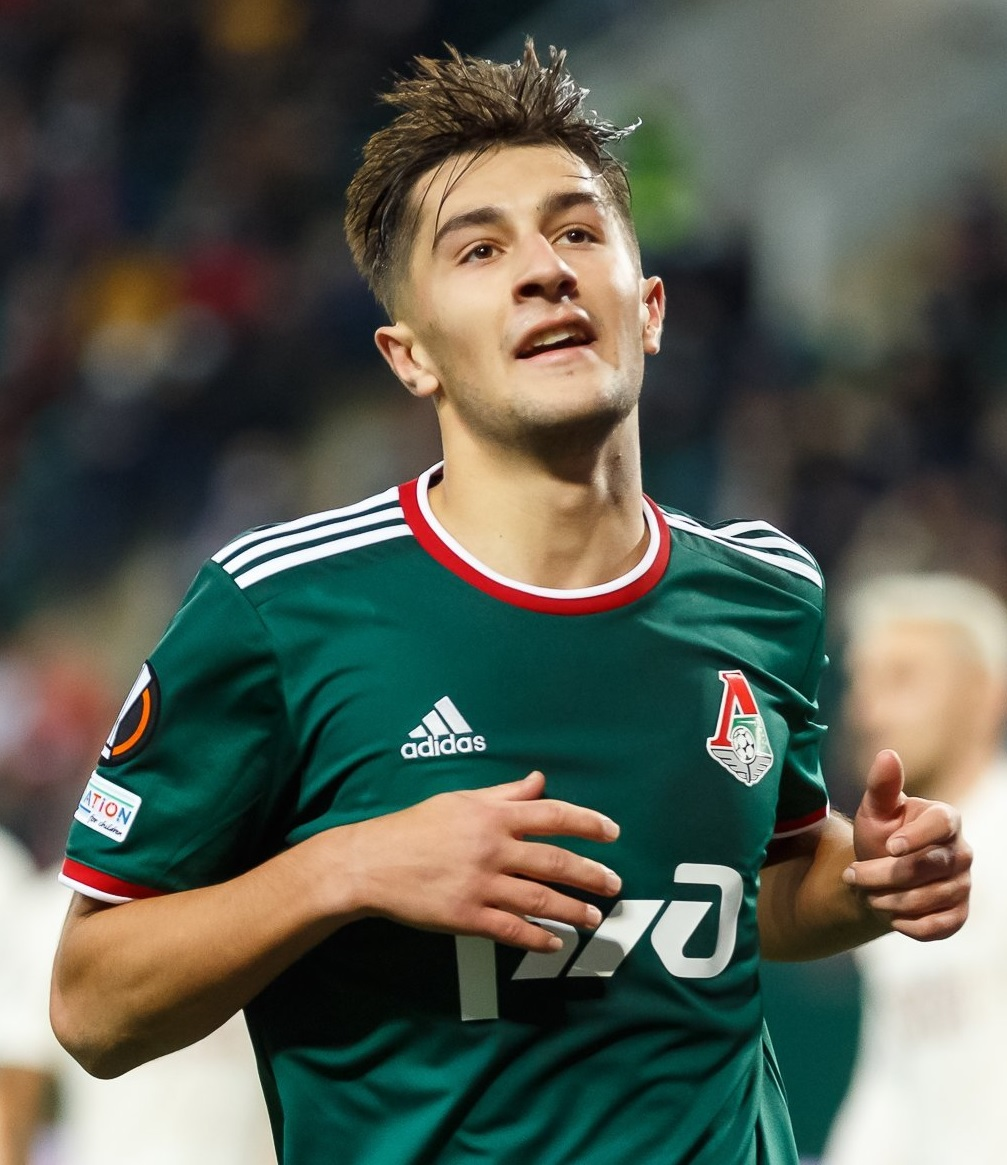
- Maradishvili with Lokomotiv in 2021

Personal information
- Full name: Konstantin Kobovich Maradishvili
- Date of birth: 7 February 2000 (age 26)
- Place of birth: Moscow, Russia
- Height: 1.79 m (5 ft 10 in)
- Position: Midfielder

Team information
- Current team: Akron Tolyatti
- Number: 22

Youth career
- 2007–2020: CSKA Moscow

Senior career*
Years	Team	Apps	(Gls)
2019–2021	CSKA Moscow	40	(2)
2021–2025	Lokomotiv Moscow	50	(5)
2023–2025	→ Pari Nizhny Novgorod (loan)	5	(0)
2025–	Akron Tolyatti	25	(1)

International career^{‡}
2019	Russia U20	5	(1)
2021	Russia U21	6	(0)
- * Club domestic league appearances and goals as of 21 November 2026 ‡ National team caps and goals as of 16 November 2021

Konstantin Kobovich Maradishvili (Russian: Константин Кобович Марадишвили; Georgian: კონსტანტინე მარადიშვილი; born 7 February 2000) is a Russian football player of Georgian descent who plays as defensive midfielder for Akron Tolyatti.

== Club career ==
Born in Moscow to a Georgian father and a Russian mother.

Maradishvili made his debut in the Russian Premier League for CSKA Moscow on 14 July 2019 in a game against Krylia Sovetov Samara, as an 88th-minute substitute for Arnór Sigurðsson. On 23 June 2020, CSKA Moscow announced that Maradishvili had extended his contract with the club until the summer of 2025.

On 2 September 2021, he signed a five-year contract with Lokomotiv Moscow.

On 23 December 2023, Maradishvili moved on loan to Pari Nizhny Novgorod until the end of the 2023–24 season.

On 12 August 2025, Maradishvili signed with Akron Tolyatti on a free transfer. He left Akron in June 2026. Maradishvili returned to Akron on 11 July 2026 with a new three-year contract.

== International career ==
He was called up to the Russia national football team for the first time in October 2021 for the World Cup qualifiers against Cyprus and Croatia. He was included in the extended 41-players list of candidates.

== Career statistics ==
=== Club ===
As of match played 21 November 2026

Appearances and goals by club, season and competition
Club	Season	League			National Cup		Continental		Other		Total	
Club	Season	Division	Apps	Goals	Apps	Goals	Apps	Goals	Apps	Goals	Apps	Goals
CSKA Moscow	2018–19	Russian Premier League	0	0	0	0	0	0	—		0	0
CSKA Moscow	2019–20	Russian Premier League	11	0	0	0	0	0	—		11	0
CSKA Moscow	2020–21	Russian Premier League	26	1	3	0	6 (Note: Appearances in UEFA Europa League)	0	—		35	1
CSKA Moscow	2021–22	Russian Premier League	3	1	0	0	—		—		3	1
CSKA Moscow	Total		40	2	3	0	6	0	0	0	49	2
Lokomotiv Moscow	2021–22	Russian Premier League	21	2	1	0	6	0	—		28	2
Lokomotiv Moscow	2022–23	Russian Premier League	21	2	5	0	—		—		26	2
Lokomotiv Moscow	2023–24	Russian Premier League	8	1	6	0	—		—		14	1
Lokomotiv Moscow	Total		50	5	12	0	6	0	0	0	68	5
Nizhny Novgorod (loan)	2023–24	Russian Premier League	3	0	—		—		—		3	0
Nizhny Novgorod (loan)	2024–25	Russian Premier League	2	0	0	0	—		—		2	0
Nizhny Novgorod (loan)	Total		5	0	0	0	0	0	0	0	5	0
Akron Tolyatti	2025–26	Russian Premier League	13	0	4	0	—		2 (Note: Appearance in relegation play-offs)	0	19	0
Akron Tolyatti	2026–27	Russian Premier League	12	1	2	0	—		—		14	1
Akron Tolyatti	Total		25	1	6	0	0	0	2	0	33	1
Career total			121	8	21	0	12	0	2	0	156	8

== Honours ==
Individual

- Russian Premier League goal of the month: July 2022.
- Russian Premier League goal of the season: 2022–23.
