= Ilya Shkurin =

Belarusian footballer

Ilya Shkurin Ілля Шкурын
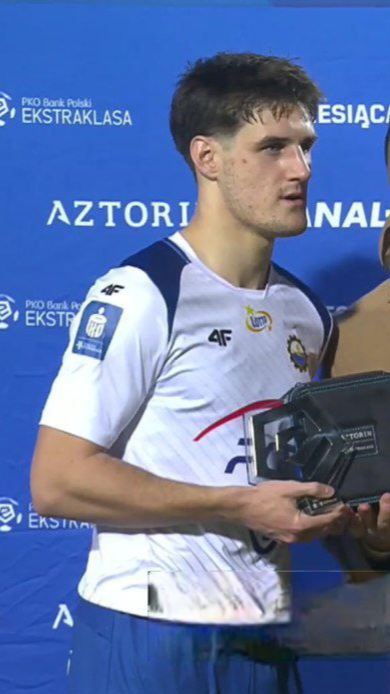
- Shkurin in 2024

Personal information
- Date of birth: 17 August 1999 (age 27)
- Place of birth: Vitebsk, Belarus
- Height: 1.88 m (6 ft 2 in)
- Position: Forward

Team information
- Current team: GKS Katowice
- Number: 17

Youth career
- 2016–2017: Vitebsk

Senior career*
Years	Team	Apps	(Gls)
2017–2018	Vitebsk	11	(1)
2019–2020	Energetik-BGU Minsk	26	(19)
2020	Dynamo Brest	0	(0)
2020–2024	CSKA Moscow	13	(3)
2021–2022	→ Dynamo Kyiv (loan)	8	(0)
2022	→ Raków Częstochowa (loan)	2	(0)
2022–2023	→ Maccabi Petah Tikva (loan)	30	(14)
2023–2024	→ Stal Mielec (loan)	33	(16)
2024–2025	Stal Mielec	20	(5)
2025	Legia Warsaw	16	(2)
2025–	GKS Katowice	37	(13)

International career
2017–2019	Belarus U21	6	(1)
- * Club domestic league appearances and goals as of 21:33, 13 October 2026 (UTC)

Ilya Shkurin or Illya Shkuryn (Belarusian: Ілля Шкурын; Russian: Илья Шкурин, Ilya Shkurin; born 17 August 1999) is a Belarusian professional footballer who plays as a centre-forward for Ekstraklasa club GKS Katowice.

== Club career ==
=== Vitebsk and Energetik-BGU Minsk ===
Shkurin was born in Vitebsk and developed in the youth system of his hometown club, FC Vitebsk. He progressed to the senior squad in 2017 and played for the club in the Belarusian Premier League during the 2017 and 2018 seasons.

Ahead of the 2019 season, he joined Energetik-BGU Minsk. Shkurin scored 19 goals in 26 league appearances and finished the campaign as the Belarusian Premier League's leading goalscorer. Energetik-BGU finished 12th in the league despite Shkurin's individual scoring record.

=== CSKA Moscow ===
Following the 2019 season, Shkurin was briefly registered with Dynamo Brest. On 9 January 2020, he moved to Russian Premier League club CSKA Moscow, signing a four-and-a-half-year contract.

Shkurin made four league appearances during the remainder of the 2019–20 season. He scored his first CSKA goal on 15 August 2020, providing the winning goal in a 2–1 league victory over Tambov. He recorded 19 appearances and three goals in all competitions for CSKA.

=== Loans to Dynamo Kyiv, Raków and Maccabi Petah Tikva ===
On 9 July 2021, Shkurin joined Ukrainian champions Dynamo Kyiv on loan for the 2021–22 season. The agreement included an option to make the move permanent. He appeared in eight Ukrainian Premier League matches and also played twice in the UEFA Champions League.

Following the suspension of football in Ukraine after the Russian invasion of Ukraine, Shkurin moved to Poland. On 26 February 2022, he joined Raków Częstochowa on loan until the end of that year, with an option to buy. He made two league appearances before the agreement was terminated by mutual consent on 5 September.

Shkurin subsequently used a FIFA provision which allowed foreign players to suspend contracts with Russian clubs. His CSKA agreement was suspended until June 2023. On the same day, he joined Israeli second-tier club Maccabi Petah Tikva.

During the 2022–23 season, Shkurin scored 14 league goals in 30 appearances. He helped Maccabi Petah Tikva win promotion to the Israeli Premier League, including scoring twice in the 7–0 victory over Bnei Yehuda which secured the club's return to the top division.

=== Stal Mielec ===
On 5 July 2023, Shkurin returned to Poland and joined Stal Mielec on a contract running until June 2024. He scored on his Ekstraklasa debut for the club against Cracovia.

On 25 November 2023, Shkurin scored a hat-trick in a 3–2 away victory over Pogoń Szczecin. He scored four goals in three matches during November and was subsequently named the Ekstraklasa Player of the Month.

On 8 January 2024, with Shkurin having recorded eight league goals and five assists during the first half of the season, Stal announced a new contract until June 2025, with an option for another year. He completed the 2023–24 Ekstraklasa season with 16 goals in 33 league appearances. His performances also earned him selection in the Polish Union of Footballers' Ekstraklasa Team of the Season.

Shkurin remained with Stal for the first part of the 2024–25 campaign, scoring five times in 20 league appearances. Across his two seasons in Mielec, he played 56 matches in all competitions and scored 23 goals.

=== Legia Warsaw ===
On 20 February 2025, Shkurin transferred to Legia Warsaw, signing a three-year contract.

On 2 May 2025, he scored Legia's third goal after entering as a substitute in a 4–3 victory over Pogoń Szczecin in the 2024–25 Polish Cup final. On 13 July, he scored the decisive goal as Legia defeated Lech Poznań 2–1 in the 2025 Polish Super Cup.

Shkurin made 25 appearances in all competitions for Legia, scoring five goals. Three of his league appearances came at the beginning of the 2025–26 season.

=== GKS Katowice ===
On 6 September 2025, Shkurin completed a permanent transfer to GKS Katowice. He signed a three-year contract which included an option to extend the agreement.

He made his GKS debut on 12 September 2025. During the 2025–26 season, Shkurin made 27 Ekstraklasa appearances and scored five goals. He also scored three goals in five Polish Cup matches. At the beginning of the 2026–27 season, he appeared in GKS Katowice's UEFA Conference League qualifying campaign.

== International career ==
Shkurin represented Belarus at under-21 level between 2017 and 2019. He made six appearances and scored one goal for the team.

In August 2020, amid protests following the disputed Belarusian presidential election, Shkurin announced that he would not represent the Belarus senior national team while Alexander Lukashenko remained in power.

In December 2020, Shkurin was removed from the lists of players eligible to represent the Belarus senior and under-21 national teams in 2021. The decision also resulted in him losing eligibility for a deferment from compulsory military service.

== Career statistics ==
As of match played 30 August 2026

Appearances and goals by club, season and competition
Club	Season	League			National cup (Note: Includes Belarusian Cup, Russian Cup, Ukrainian Cup, Israel State Cup, Polish Cup)		League cup		Continental		Other		Total	
Club	Season	Division	Apps	Goals	Apps	Goals	Apps	Goals	Apps	Goals	Apps	Goals	Apps	Goals
Vitebsk	2017	Belarusian Premier League	4	1	1	0	—		—		—		5	1
Vitebsk	2018	Belarusian Premier League	7	0	2	1	—		—		—		9	1
Vitebsk	Total		11	1	3	1	—		—		—		14	2
Energetik-BGU Minsk	2019	Belarusian Premier League	26	19	2	2	—		—		—		28	21
CSKA Moscow	2019–20	Russian Premier League	4	0	1	0	—		0	0	—		5	0
CSKA Moscow	2020–21	Russian Premier League	9	3	3	0	—		2 (Note: Appearances in UEFA Europa League)	0	—		14	3
CSKA Moscow	2021–22	Russian Premier League	0	0	0	0	—		—		—		0	0
CSKA Moscow	2022–23	Russian Premier League	0	0	0	0	—		—		—		0	0
CSKA Moscow	Total		13	3	4	0	—		2	0	—		19	3
Dynamo Kyiv (loan)	2021–22	Ukrainian Premier League	8	0	1	0	—		2 (Note: Appearances in UEFA Champions League)	0	0	0	11	0
Raków Częstochowa (loan)	2021–22	Ekstraklasa	2	0	0	0	—		0	0	0	0	2	0
Maccabi Petah Tikva (loan)	2022–23	Liga Leumit	30	14	3	1	0	0	—		—		33	15
Stal Mielec (loan)	2023–24	Ekstraklasa	33	16	2	2	—		—		—		35	18
Stal Mielec	2024–25	Ekstraklasa	20	5	1	0	—		—		—		21	5
Stal Mielec	Total		53	21	3	2	—		—		—		56	23
Legia Warsaw	2024–25	Ekstraklasa	13	2	3	2	—		—		—		16	4
Legia Warsaw	2025–26	Ekstraklasa	3	0	0	0	—		5 (Note: Four appearances in UEFA Europa League, one appearance in UEFA Conference League)	0	1 (Note: Appearance in Polish Super Cup)	1	9	1
Legia Warsaw	Total		16	2	3	2	—		5	0	1	1	25	5
GKS Katowice	2025–26	Ekstraklasa	27	5	5	3	—		—		—		32	8
GKS Katowice	2026–27	Ekstraklasa	5	5	0	0	—		4 (Note: Appearances in UEFA Conference League)	2	—		9	7
GKS Katowice	Total		32	10	5	3	—		4	2	—		41	15
Career total			191	70	24	11	0	0	13	2	1	1	229	84

== Honours ==
Legia Warsaw

- Polish Cup: 2024–25
- Polish Super Cup: 2025

Individual

- Belarusian Premier League top goalscorer: 2019
- Ekstraklasa Player of the Month: November 2023
- Polish Union of Footballers' Ekstraklasa Team of the Season: 2023–24
