= Vitaly Zhironkin =

Russian footballer

Personal information
- Full name: Vitaly Mikhaylovich Zhironkin
- Date of birth: 10 March 2000 (age 26)
- Place of birth: Balakovo, Russia
- Height: 1.72 m (5 ft 8 in)
- Position: Forward

Senior career*
Years	Team	Apps	(Gls)
2016–2022	CSKA Moscow	0	(0)
2019–2020	→ Baltika Kaliningrad (loan)	10	(0)
2020–2021	→ Baltika Kaliningrad (loan)	7	(0)
2021	→ KAMAZ Naberezhnye Chelny (loan)	13	(6)
2021–2022	→ Volgar Astrakhan (loan)	10	(1)
2022	→ Kairat Moscow (loan)	12	(6)
2022–2023	Tekstilshchik Ivanovo	31	(10)
2023–2024	Leningradets	26	(3)
2024	Volga Ulyanovsk	9	(1)
2025	Spartak Kostroma	1	(0)

International career^{‡}
2017	Russia U17	7	(3)
2017	Russia U18	3	(0)
2018	Russia U19	4	(1)
2019	Russia U20	4	(0)
- * Club domestic league appearances and goals as of 14 June 2025 ‡ National team caps and goals as of 5 August 2019

Vitaly Mikhaylovich Zhironkin (Russian: Виталий Михайлович Жиронкин; born 10 March 2000) is a Russian football player.

== Club career ==
On 1 July 2019, Zhironkin joined Baltika Kaliningrad on loan for the 2019–20 season. Zhironkin made his debut in the Russian Football National League for Baltika on 13 July 2019 in a game against Torpedo Moscow.

On 20 July 2020, CSKA announced that Zhironkin had returned to Baltika Kaliningrad on loan for the 2020–21 season. On 13 January 2021, the loan was terminated early.

On 1 February 2021, he joined KAMAZ Naberezhnye Chelny on loan until the end of the 2020–21 season.

On 2 July 2021, he was loaned to Volgar Astrakhan for the 2021–22 season. On 27 January 2022, the loan was terminated early and he moved to Kairat Moscow on a new loan.

On 11 July 2022, Zhirnokin moved to Tekstilshchik Ivanovo on a permanent basis.
