= VEB Arena =

Multi-use stadium in Moscow, Russia

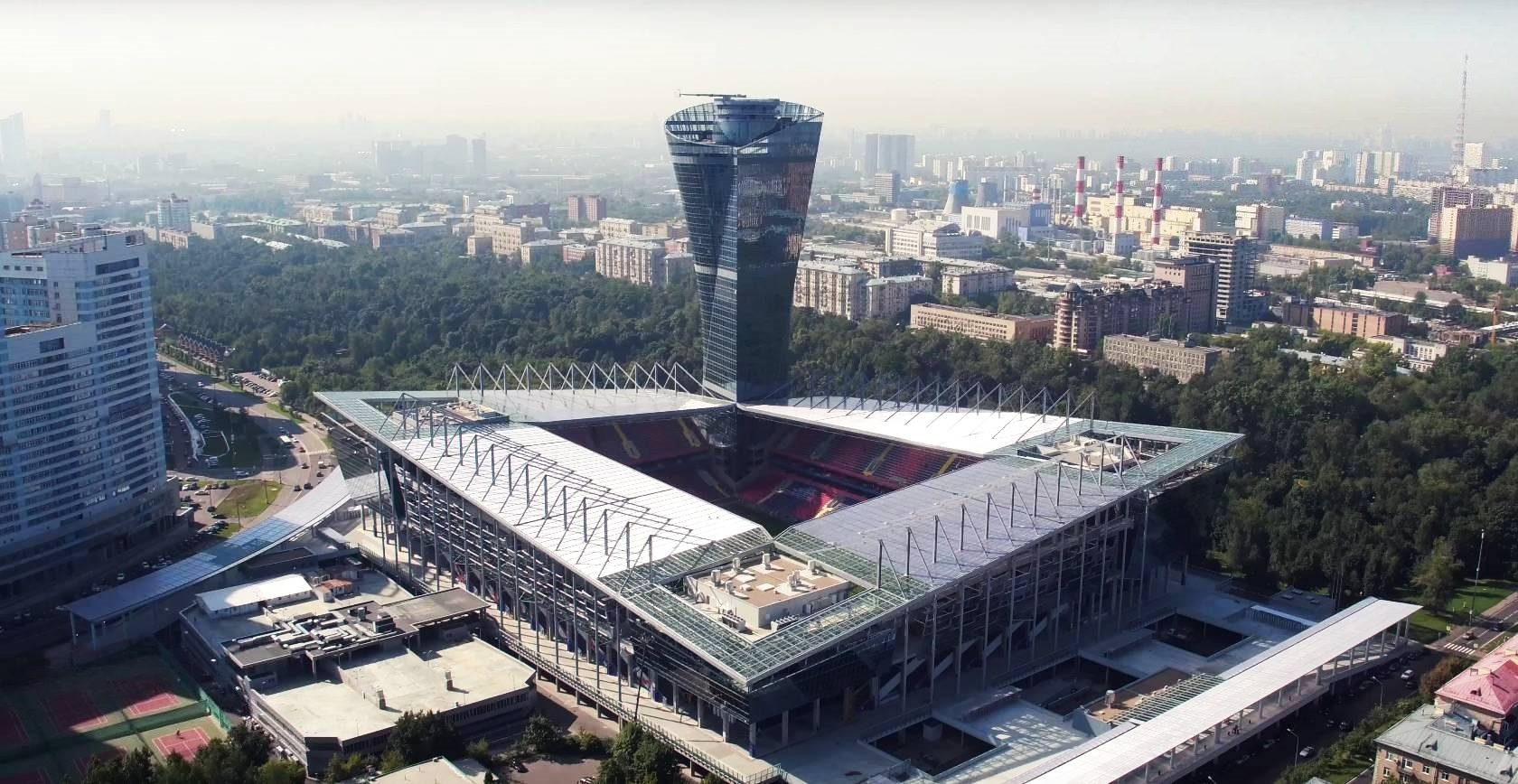
- UEFA
- Interactive map of VEB Arena
- Location: Khodynka Field, Moscow, Russia
- Coordinates: 55°47′29″N 37°30′58″E
- Owner: CSKA Moscow
- Operator: CSKA Moscow
- Capacity: 29,071 (Russian Premier League)
- Surface: Grass
- Record attendance: 29,284 (12 April 2018)
- Field size: 110 m × 68 m (361 ft × 223 ft)
- Public transit: CSKA; Zorge

Construction
- Groundbreaking: 19 May 2007
- Opened: 10 September 2016
- Cost: 350 million USD

Tenants
- CSKA Moscow (2016–present); Russia national football team (selected matches)

VEB Arena (Russian: «ВЭБ-Арена»), known as Arena CSKA due to UEFA sponsorship regulations, is a multi-use stadium in Khodynka Field, Moscow, Russia, that was completed in 2016. It is used mostly for football matches and host the home matches of CSKA Moscow and occasionally the Russian national team.

The stadium is located near the Khodynka Field in the Park of Birch Grove.

== History ==
The construction process started in 2007 but had been halted several times, with the longest pause lasting 16 months (between 2009 and 2011).

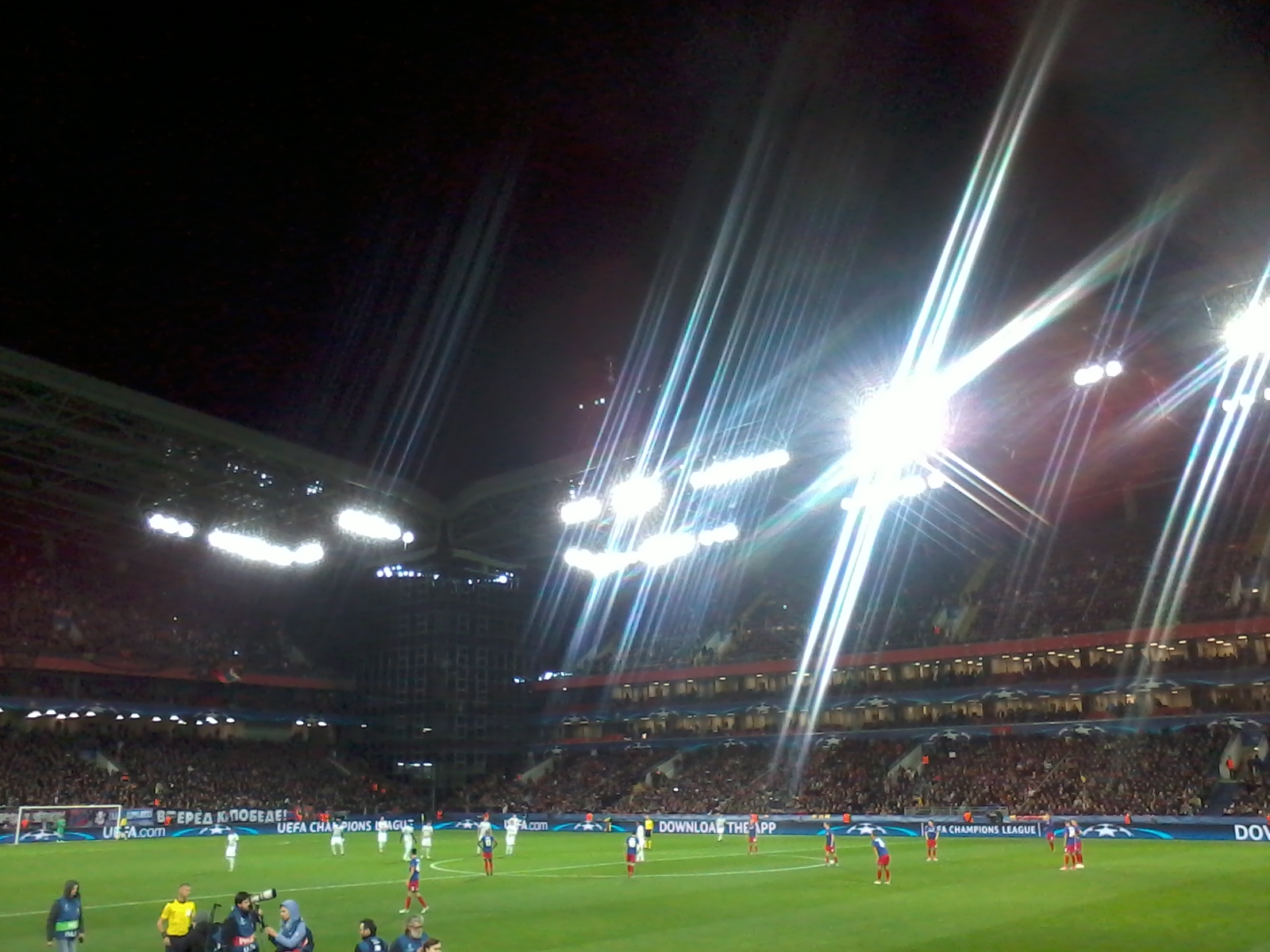
VEB Arena during a UEFA Champions League match between CSKA Moscow and Manchester United in 2017.

The VEB Arena has a capacity around 30,000 people. An integral part of the stadium is a skyscraper designed to resemble the UEFA Cup, the first European trophy won by a Russian club, with CSKA beating Sporting CP in 2005.

The first match at the new stadium was supposed to be the 2016 Russian Super Cup between CSKA and Zenit Saint Petersburg on 23 July 2016, but due to the stadium's unpreparedness the game was moved to the RZD Arena. The actual first match was played on 4 September 2016, a closed friendly match between CSKA and Torpedo Moscow), in which CSKA won 3–0. The first official match at the stadium was held six days later against Terek Grozny; CSKA also won 3–0. Lacina Traoré scored the first official goal in the new arena.

On 27 September 2016, the stadium held its first European match; in the Champions League against the English club Tottenham Hotspur, in which CSKA lost 0–1. On 30 April 2017, CSKA lost 1–2 to Spartak Moscow. This was the first league defeat for CSKA in this stadium. On 9 June 2017, the Russian national team played at the stadium for the first time.

On 28 February 2017, CSKA Moscow announced that they had sold the naming rights to the stadium to Russian bank VEB, with the stadium becoming the VEB Arena.

Exactly a year after its first European match at the stadium, CSKA played in a UEFA Champions League match against another English team. Manchester United defeated CSKA 4–1 as the match broke the attendance record with 29,073 spectators.

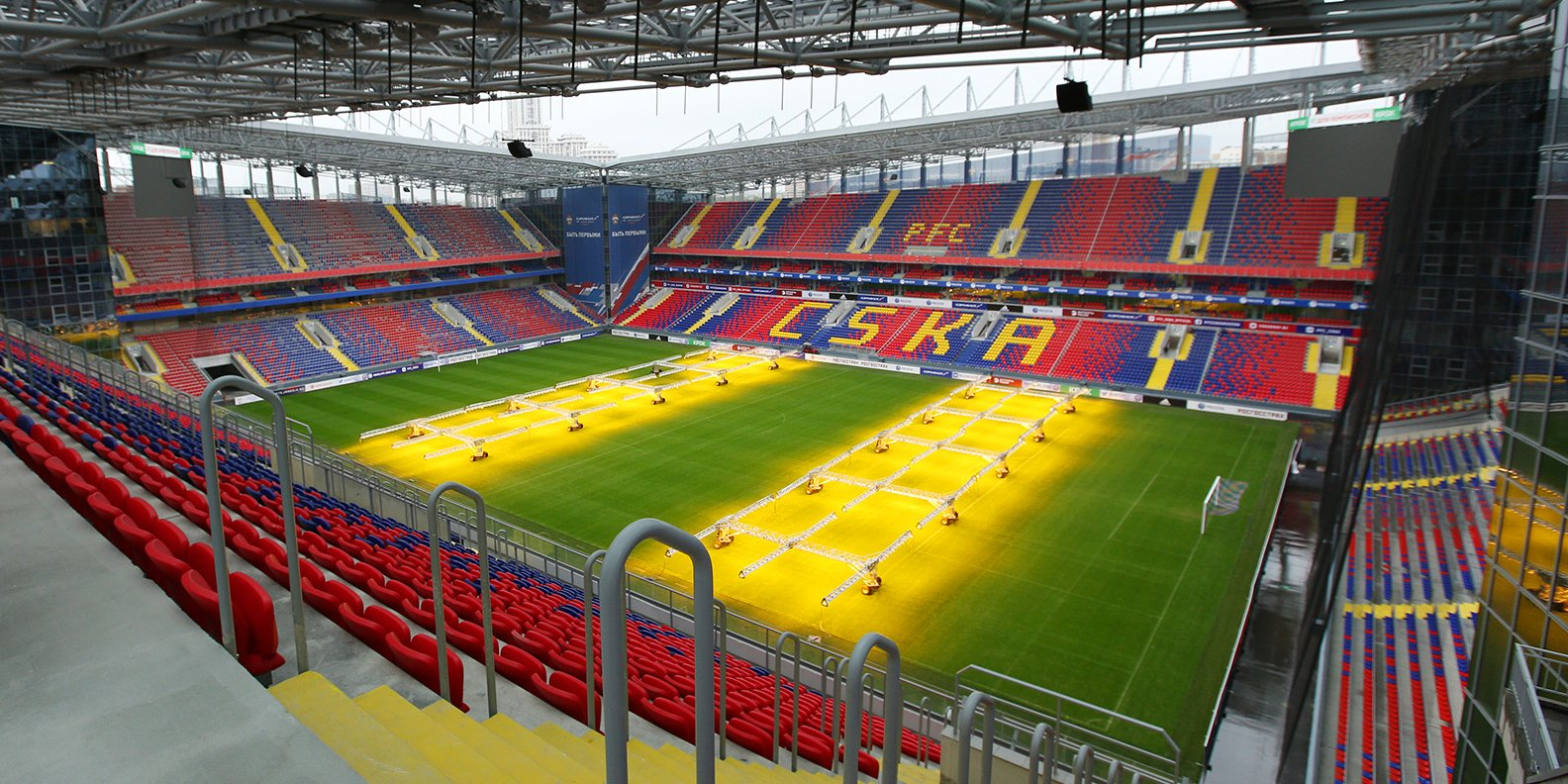
A panoramic photograph of the stadium

== Russian fixtures ==
Date	Time	Result	Competition	Attendance	Ref.
9 June 2017	19:00 MSK (UTC+3)	Russia 1–1 Chile	Friendly	22,000	
7 October 2017	17:00 MSK (UTC+3)	Russia 4–2 South Korea	Friendly	24,200	
5 June 2018	19:00 MSK (UTC+3)	Russia 1–1 Turkey	Friendly	27,423	

== Concerts ==
Park Live 5 festival took place at the stadium, System Of A Down and Three Days Grace performed in front of more than 20,000 people.

== See also ==
- Grigory Fedotov Stadium, previous stadium
- Light-Athletic Football Complex CSKA, training field with artificial turf located nearby
