= Gocha Gogrichiani (footballer, born 2000) =

Russian football player

Personal information
- Full name: Gocha Gochayevich Gogrichiani
- Date of birth: 5 May 2000 (age 26)
- Place of birth: Sochi, Russia
- Height: 1.83 m (6 ft 0 in)
- Position: Forward

Team information
- Current team: Volna
- Number: 9

Youth career
- –2014: Krasnodar
- 2014–2015: CSKA Moscow
- 2015–2018: SSh-10 Sochi
- 2018–2020: Rostov

Senior career*
Years	Team	Apps	(Gls)
2020–2022	CSKA Moscow	0	(0)
2020–2021	→ Akron Tolyatti (loan)	10	(1)
2021–2022	→ Tekstilshchik Ivanovo (loan)	33	(8)
2022–2025	Baltika Kaliningrad	15	(1)
2022–2023	Baltika-BFU Kaliningrad	10	(1)
2023–2024	→ Volgar Astrakhan (loan)	6	(0)
2025	Oryol	27	(15)
2026–	Volna	19	(14)
- * Club domestic league appearances and goals as of 31 October 2026

Gocha Gochayevich Gogrichiani (Russian: Гоча Гочаевич Гогричиани; born 5 May 2000) is a Russian football player who plays for Volna.

== Club career ==
He made his debut in the Russian Football National League for Akron Tolyatti on 27 February 2021 in a game against Veles Moscow. He came on a substitute in 85th minute and scored an equalizer in a 1–1 away draw 3 minutes later.

On 17 June 2021, he moved to Tekstilshchik Ivanovo on loan for the 2021–22 season.

On 4 July 2022, Gogrichiani signed a three-year contract with Baltika Kaliningrad.

On 3 August 2023, Gogrichiani was loaned to Volgar Astrakhan.

== Personal life ==
His father, also called Gocha Gogrichiani, was a Georgian international footballer.

In October 2022, FC Baltika Kaliningrad suspended Gogrichiani from training due to an internal investigation of the club related to the accusation of beating a girlfriend.
