= 2018–19 PFC CSKA Moscow season =

CSKA Moscow
2018–19 season
- Chairman: Yevgeni Giner
- Manager: Viktor Goncharenko
- Stadium: VEB Arena
- Premier League: 4th
- Russian Cup: Round of 32
- Super Cup: Winners
- Champions League: Group stage
- Top goalscorer: League: Fyodor Chalov (15); All: Fyodor Chalov (17)
- Highest home attendance: 71,811 vs Real Madrid (28 January 2020)
- Lowest home attendance: 9,013 vs Yenisey Krasnoyarsk (8 December 2018)
- Average home league attendance: 26,582 (26 May 2019)
Home colours	Away colours	Third colours

The 2018–19 PFC CSKA Moscow season was the 27th successive season that the club play in the Russian Premier League, the highest tier of association football in Russia.

== Season events ==
On 5 June, Georgi Shchennikov signed a new contract with CSKA until the summer of 2023. On 14 June, CSKA announced that Konstantin Bazelyuk would spend the 2018–19 season on loan at FC SKA-Khabarovsk.

On 15 June it was confirmed that CSKA would take FC Tosno's place in the Russian Super Cup on 27 July.

On 20 June, CSKA Moscow announced that they had agreed the transfer of Hörður Magnússon with Bristol City, with personal terms still to be signed, whilst Bristol City announced that Magnússon had left for an undisclosed fee. Two days later, 22 June, CSKA announced the signing of Jaka Bijol on a five-year contract from Rudar Velenje.

On 2 July, Sergei Tkachyov moved to Arsenal Tula on a season-long loan deal.

On 4 July, CSKA Moscow announced the signing of Rodrigo Becão on a season-long loan deal from Bahia.

On 8 July, Sergei Ignashevich announced his retirement from football, with Aleksei Berezutski and Vasili Berezutski also announcing their retirement from football on 20 July.

On 18 July, Kirill Nababkin extended his contract with CSKA Moscow until the end of the 2019/20 season, with manager Viktor Goncharenko also extending his contract the following day, until the end of the 2019/20 season.

On 26 July, CSKA Moscow announced the signing of Ilzat Akhmetov on a four-year contract after his Rubin Kazan contract had expired.

On 27 July, CSKA Moscow announced that Aleksandr Golovin had signed for AS Monaco on a record-breaking transfer fee for CSKA Moscow. Later the same day, CSKA Moscow won their seventh Russian Super Cup, with a 1-0 extra time victory over Lokomotiv Moscow. After the game, CSKA Moscow confirmed that Vitinho had left the club to join Flamengo.

On 1 August, CSKA Moscow announced the arrival of Abel Hernández from Hull City on a three-year contract.

On 14 August, CSKA Moscow announced that Aaron Olanare had left the club after his contract with cancelled by mutual consent. The following day, 15 August, CSKA Moscow announced the arrival of Nikola Vlašić on a season-long loan deal from Everton

On 30 August, Igor Akinfeev signed a new contract with CSKA until the summer of 2022.

On 31 August, CSKA Moscow announced that Arnór Sigurðsson had signed on a five-year contract from IFK Norrköping, that Takuma Nishimura had signed on a four-year contract from Vegalta Sendai, and Ivan Oblyakov had signed from FC Ufa until the summer of 2023.

On 5 October, CSKA Moscow announced the signing of Malian striker Lassana N'Diaye, on a contract until the summer of 2023, after he turned 18 on 3 October.

On 18 December, CSKA Moscow announced that goalkeeper Pavel Ovchinnikov and defender Ivan Maklakov had left the club at the expiration of their contracts.

On 9 January 2019, Nayair Tiknizyan and Vitaly Zhironkin both signed a new contracts with the CSKA until the summer of 2022. On 22 January, CSKA Moscow announced that Fyodor Chalov had signed a new contract with the club, until the summer of 2022.

On 24 January, Timur Zhamaletdinov joined Lech Poznań on loan until the end of the season, with an option for Lech Poznań to make the move permanent at the end of the season. The following day Khetag Khosonov joined Tambov on loan until the end of the season, whilst Astemir Gordyushenko joined Tyumen on loan until the end of the season.

On 11 February, Timur Pukhov left CSKA Moscow to join Lithuanian club FK Žalgiris. On 19 February, Aleksandr Makarov moved on loan to Avangard Kursk for the remainder of the season, whilst Maksim Yedapin joined Yenisey Krasnoyarsk on a similar deal.

On 22 February, CSKA Moscow announced that Ivan Oleynikov had joined Fakel Voronezh on loan until the end of the season, whilst Igor Diveyev had joined the club on loan until the end of the season from Ufa, with an option to make the move permanent in the summer.

On 26 April, Viktor Vasin signed a new contract with CSKA, keeping him at the club until the summer of 2021.

On 31 May, CSKA Moscow announced that they had exercised their option to make Igor Diveyev's loan deal permanent, signing him to a five-year contract, whilst Anatoli Anisimov left the club after the expiration of his contract.

== Squad ==
As of match played 26 May 2019

Number	Name	Nationality	Position	Date of birth (age)	Signed from	Signed in	Contract ends	Apps.	Goals
Goalkeepers
1	Ilya Pomazun	(Russia)	GK	16 August 1996 (aged 22)	Academy	2012		5	0
22	Georgi Kyrnats	(Russia)	GK	22 June 1998 (aged 20)	Academy	2015		1	0
35	Igor Akinfeev	(Russia)	GK	8 April 1986 (aged 33)	Academy	2003	2022	601	0
Defenders
2	Mário Fernandes	(Russia)	DF	19 September 1990 (aged 28)	Grêmio	2012	2022	236	3
3	Nikita Chernov	(Russia)	DF	14 January 1996 (aged 23)	Academy	2013		20	0
5	Viktor Vasin	(Russia)	DF	6 October 1988 (aged 30)	Spartak Nalchik	2011	2021	63	2
14	Kirill Nababkin	(Russia)	DF	8 September 1986 (aged 32)	Moscow	2010	2020	233	4
23	Hörður Magnússon	(Iceland)	DF	11 February 1993 (aged 26)	Bristol City	2018		27	2
42	Georgi Shchennikov	(Russia)	DF	27 April 1991 (aged 28)	Academy	2008	2023	306	8
50	Rodrigo Becão	(Brazil)	DF	19 January 1996 (aged 23)	loan from Bahia	2018	2019	36	0
78	Igor Diveyev	(Russia)	DF	27 September 1999 (aged 19)	loan from Ufa	2019	2024	10	0
90	Semyon Matviychuk	(Russia)	DF	1 May 1998 (aged 21)	Dynamo Moscow	2017		1	0
Midfielders
8	Nikola Vlašić	(Croatia)	MF	4 October 1997 (aged 21)	loan from Everton	2018	2019	31	8
10	Alan Dzagoev	(Russia)	MF	17 June 1990 (aged 28)	Krylia Sovetov-SOK Dimitrovgrad	2008	2019	342	75
15	Dmitry Yefremov	(Russia)	MF	1 April 1995 (aged 24)	Akademiya Tolyatti	2013		52	0
17	Arnór Sigurðsson	(Iceland)	MF	15 May 1999 (aged 20)	IFK Norrköping	2018	2023	27	7
20	Konstantin Kuchayev	(Russia)	MF	18 March 1998 (aged 21)	Academy	2015		41	1
25	Kristijan Bistrović	(Croatia)	MF	9 April 1998 (aged 21)	Slaven Belupo	2018	2022	32	2
29	Jaka Bijol	(Slovenia)	MF	5 February 1999 (aged 20)	Rudar Velenje	2018	2023	27	4
47	Anatoli Anisimov	(Russia)	MF	23 May 1998 (aged 21)	Rubin Kazan	2016		1	0
71	Nayair Tiknizyan	(Russia)	MF	12 May 1999 (aged 20)	Academy	2013	2022	2	0
77	Ilzat Akhmetov	(Russia)	MF	31 December 1997 (aged 21)	Rubin Kazan	2018	2022	30	0
98	Ivan Oblyakov	(Russia)	MF	5 July 1998 (aged 20)	Ufa	2018	2023	29	3
Forwards
9	Fyodor Chalov	(Russia)	FW	10 April 1998 (aged 21)	Academy	2015	2022	86	30
11	Abel Hernández	(Uruguay)	FW	8 August 1990 (aged 28)	Hull City	2018	2021	15	3
18	Lassana N'Diaye	(Mali)	FW	3 October 2000 (aged 18)	Guidars	2018	2023	0	0
19	Takuma Nishimura	(Japan)	FW	15 May 1999 (aged 20)	IFK Norrköping	2018	2022	15	2
81	Vitali Zhironkin	(Russia)	FW	10 March 2000 (aged 19)	Academy	2018		0	0
85	Danila Yanov	(Russia)	FW	27 January 2000 (aged 19)	Strogino Moscow	2018		0	0
Away on loan
31	Aleksandr Makarov	(Russia)	MF	24 April 1996 (aged 23)	Academy	2013		2	0
72	Astemir Gordyushenko	(Russia)	MF	30 March 1997 (aged 22)	Academy	2016	2020	19	0
75	Timur Zhamaletdinov	(Russia)	FW	21 May 1997 (aged 22)	Academy	2014		42	5
80	Khetag Khosonov	(Russia)	MF	18 June 1998 (aged 20)	Academy	2014		17	1
82	Ivan Oleynikov	(Russia)	MF	24 August 1998 (aged 20)	Academy	2015		2	0
	Maksim Yedapin	(Russia)	GK	3 April 2000 (aged 19)	Academy	2015		0	0
	Sergei Tkachyov	(Russia)	MF	19 May 1989 (aged 30)	Kuban Krasnodar	2016	2019	11	0
	Konstantin Bazelyuk	(Russia)	FW	12 April 1993 (aged 26)	Academy	2010		27	4
Players who left during the season
11	Vitinho	(Brazil)	FW	9 October 1993 (aged 25)	Botafogo	2013	2020	84	18
70	Timur Pukhov	(Russia)	MF	17 June 1998 (aged 20)	Academy	2015		1	1
78	Ivan Maklakov	(Russia)	DF	17 April 1998 (aged 21)	Academy	2015	2018	1	0
84	Pavel Ovchinnikov	(Russia)	GK	24 March 1998 (aged 21)	Academy	2015	2018	0	0
99	Aaron Olanare	(Nigeria)	FW	4 June 1994 (aged 24)	Guangzhou R&F	2017	2021	28	4

=== Out on loan ===
Note: Flags indicate national team as defined under FIFA eligibility rules; some limited exceptions apply. Players may hold more than one non-FIFA nationality.

No.	Pos.	Nation	Player
31	MF	RUS	Aleksandr Makarov (at Avangard Kursk)
72	MF	RUS	Astemir Gordyushenko (at Tyumen)
75	MF	RUS	Timur Zhamaletdinov (at Lech Poznań)
80	MF	RUS	Khetag Khosonov (at Tambov)

No.	Pos.	Nation	Player
82	MF	RUS	Ivan Oleynikov (at Fakel Voronezh)
—	GK	RUS	Maksim Yedapin (at Yenisey Krasnoyarsk)
—	MF	RUS	Sergei Tkachyov (at Arsenal Tula)
—	FW	RUS	Konstantin Bazelyuk (at SKA-Khabarovsk)

== Transfers ==
=== In ===
Date	Position	Nationality	Name	From	Fee	Ref.
20 June 2018	DF	(Iceland)	Hörður Magnússon	Bristol City	Undisclosed	
22 June 2018	MF	(Slovenia)	Jaka Bijol	Rudar Velenje	Undisclosed	
26 July 2018	MF	(Russia)	Ilzat Akhmetov	Rubin Kazan	Free	
1 August 2018	FW	(Uruguay)	Abel Hernández	Hull City	Free	
31 August 2018	MF	(Iceland)	Arnór Sigurðsson	IFK Norrköping	Undisclosed	
31 August 2018	FW	(Japan)	Takuma Nishimura	Vegalta Sendai	Undisclosed	
5 October 2018	FW	(Mali)	Lassana N'Diaye	Guidars	Undisclosed	
31 May 2019	DF	(Russia)	Igor Diveyev	Ufa	Undisclosed	

=== Out ===
Date	Position	Nationality	Name	To	Fee	Ref.
6 July 2018	MF	(Russia)	Nikita Matskharashvili	Shinnik Yaroslavl	Undisclosed	
27 July 2018	MF	(Russia)	Aleksandr Golovin	AS Monaco	Undisclosed	
27 July 2018	MF	(Brazil)	Vitinho	Flamengo	Undisclosed	
11 February 2019	MF	(Russia)	Timur Pukhov	Žalgiris	Undisclosed	

=== Loans in ===
Date from	Position	Nationality	Name	From	Date to	Ref.
4 July 2018	DF	(Brazil)	Rodrigo Becão	Bahia	End of Season	
15 August 2018	MF	(Croatia)	Nikola Vlašić	Everton	End of Season	
22 February 2019	DF	(Russia)	Igor Diveyev	Ufa	End of Season	

=== Loans out ===
Date from	Position	Nationality	Name	To	Date to	Ref.
14 June 2018	FW	(Russia)	Konstantin Bazelyuk	SKA-Khabarovsk	End of Season	
2 July 2018	MF	(Russia)	Sergei Tkachyov	Arsenal Tula	End of Season	
24 January 2019	FW	(Russia)	Timur Zhamaletdinov	Lech Poznań	End of Season	
25 January 2019	MF	(Russia)	Khetag Khosonov	Tambov	End of Season	
25 January 2019	MF	(Russia)	Astemir Gordyushenko	Tyumen	End of Season	
19 February 2019	GK	(Russia)	Maksim Yedapin	Yenisey Krasnoyarsk	End of Season	
19 February 2019	MF	(Russia)	Aleksandr Makarov	Avangard Kursk	End of Season	
22 February 2019	MF	(Russia)	Ivan Oleynikov	Fakel Voronezh	End of Season	

=== Released ===
Date	Position	Nationality	Name	Joined	Date
8 July 2018	DF	(Russia)	Sergei Ignashevich	Retired	
21 July 2018	DF	(Russia)	Aleksei Berezutski	Retired	
21 July 2018	DF	(Russia)	Vasili Berezutski	Retired	
14 August 2018	FW	(Nigeria)	Aaron Olanare	Beitar Jerusalem	12 October 2018
18 December 2018	GK	(Russia)	Pavel Ovchinnikov	Dolgoprudny	
18 December 2018	DF	(Russia)	Ivan Maklakov	Zenit St.Petersburg	24 February 2019
27 May 2019	FW	(Uruguay)	Abel Hernández	Al Ahli	
31 May 2019	MF	(Russia)	Anatoli Anisimov	Ural Yekaterinburg	

== Friendlies ==
29 June 2018	Admira Wacker (Austria)	1 – 1	(Russia) CSKA Moscow	Maria Enzersdorf, Austria
18:00 MSK (UTC+3)	27'	Report	Chalov 20'	Stadium: BSFZ-Arena

7 July 2018	CSKA Moscow (Russia)	1 – 4	(Denmark) Copenhagen	Loipersdorf-Kitzladen, Austria
19:00 MSK (UTC+3)	Gordyushenko 51'	Report	Falk 7'; Kodro 20'; Greguš 61'; Kadrii 69'	Stadium: Waldstadion Dietersdorf

11 July 2018	CSKA Moscow (Russia)	0 – 1	(Germany) HSV	Draßburg, Austria
18:45 MSK (UTC+3)		Report	Holtby 72' (pen.)	Stadium: Sportzentrum Draßburg

15 July 2018	CSKA Moscow (Russia)	4 – 1	(Turkey) Beşiktaş	Graz, Austria
15:00 MSK (UTC+3)	Chalov 15'; Gordyushenko 27'; Vitinho 53'; Yefremov 75'	Report	Arslan 8'	Stadium: Liebenauer Stadium

21 July 2018	CSKA Moscow	1 – 1	Yenisey Krasnoyarsk	Moscow
13:00 MSK (UTC+3)	Yefremov 34'; Bijol (yellow card) 82'; Nababkin (yellow card) 90'	Report	Zanev (yellow card) 21'; Obradović 59' (pen.)	Stadium: VEB Arena

9 September 2018	CSKA Moscow	1 – 2	Arsenal Tula	Moscow
14:00 MSK (UTC+3)	Hernández 43' (pen.)	Report	Khagush (yellow card) 67'; Khlusevich 66'; Maksimenko 71'	Stadium: VEB Arena

21 January 2018	CSKA Moscow (Russia)	5 – 0	(Latvia) Ventspils	Campoamor, Spain
18:00 MSK (UTC+3)	Hernández 7'; Nishimura 24'; Zhamaletdinov 27'; Dzagoev 54' (pen.); Bijol 86'	Report

22 January 2018	CSKA Moscow (Russia)	2 – 1	(Norway) Molde	Campoamor, Spain
14:00 MSK (UTC+3)	Akhmetov 80'; Nababkin 89'	Report	Chukwu 78'

29 January 2018	CSKA Moscow (Russia)	2 – 1	(Denmark) Nordsjælland	La Manga, Spain
18:00 MSK (UTC+3)	Chalov 20' (pen.); Oblyakov 38'; Becão (yellow card) 78'	Report	Olsen 61'

2 February 2018	CSKA Moscow (Russia)	3 – 3	(Norway) Sarpsborg 08	Campoamor, Spain
19:00 MSK (UTC+3)	Vlašić 3'; Chalov 31'; Hernández 59'	Report	J.Larsen 22', 43', 48'

6 February 2018	CSKA Moscow (Russia)	3 – 0	(Norway) Odd	Campoamor, Spain
19:00 MSK (UTC+3)	Dzagoev 8'; Sigurðsson (yellow card) 59' (goal) 61'; Shchennikov 75'	Report

7 February 2018	CSKA Moscow (Russia)	3 – 0	(Norway) Sogndal	Campoamor, Spain
14:00 MSK (UTC+3)	Tiknizyan (yellow card) 42'; Bijol (yellow card) 56' (goal) 70', 85'; Nishimura 74'	Report

16 February 2018	CSKA Moscow (Russia)	1 – 1	(England) Newcastle United	San Pedro del Pinatar, Spain
14:00 MSK (UTC+3)	Hernández 40'	Report	Rondón 16'	Stadium: Pinatar Arena; Attendance: 3,500

19 February 2018	CSKA Moscow (Russia)	3 – 1	(Spain) Cartagena	Cartagena, Spain
20:00 MSK (UTC+3)	Sigurðsson 19', 37'; Akhmetov 90'	Report	Carrillo 54'	Stadium: Ciudad Deportiva Gómez Meseguer

22 February 2018	CSKA Moscow	–	Ufa	Cartagena, Spain
18:00 MSK (UTC+3)				Stadium: Ciudad Deportiva Gómez Meseguer

== Competitions ==
=== Super Cup ===
27 July 2018	Lokomotiv Moscow	0 – 1 (a.e.t.)	CSKA Moscow	Nizhny Novgorod
21:30 MSK (UTC+3)	Kvirkvelia (red card) 113'	Report	Bistrović (yellow card) 57'; Chernov (yellow card) 66'; Khosonov 106'	Stadium: Nizhny Novgorod Stadium; Attendance: 43,319; Referee: Vladislav Bezborodov

=== Premier League ===
==== Results by round ====
Round	1	2	3	4	5	6	7	8	9	10	11	12	13	14	15	16	17	18	19	20	21	22	23	24	25	26	27	28	29	30
Ground	A	H	A	H	A	H	A	H	A	H	A	H	A	H	A	A	H	A	H	A	H	A	H	A	H	A	H	A	H	H
Result	D	L	D	W	D	W	W	D	W	L	W	L	D	W	W	D	W	L	W	W	D	W	L	D	W	L	D	L	W	W
Position	7	12	13	7	8	6	5	5	4	6	3	6	5	5	3	3	3	3	3	2	4	3	4	4	3	4	4	5	5	4

Updated to match(es) played on 26 May 2019. Source: See Results
A = Away; H = Home; W = Win; D = Draw; L = Loss

==== Results ====
31 July 2018 1	Krylia Sovetov	0 – 0	CSKA Moscow	Samara
19:00 MSK (UTC+3)	Zotov (yellow card) 23'; Chicherin (yellow card) 76'	Report	Chernov (yellow card) 84'	Stadium: Cosmos Arena; Attendance: 39,137; Referee: Sergey Lapochkin

5 August 2018 2	CSKA Moscow	0 – 1	Rostov	Moscow
19:00 MSK (UTC+3)	Akhmetov (yellow card) 50'; Bijol (yellow card) 65'; Nababkin (yellow card) 90+3'	Report	Parshivlyuk 7'; Yusupov (yellow card) 52'	Stadium: VEB Arena; Attendance: 19,084; Referee: Evgeny Turbin

11 August 2018 3	Yenisey Krasnoyarsk	1 – 1	CSKA Moscow	Tyumen
16:30 MSK (UTC+3)	Ogude (yellow card) 51'; Kostyukov 58'; Gadzhibekov (yellow card) 64'	Report	Nababkin (red card) 50'; Hernández 79' (pen.)	Stadium: Geolog Stadium; Attendance: 11,209; Referee: Roman Galimov
Note: Match played at the Geolog Stadium in Tyumen, due renovation work at Yenisey Krasnoyarsk's Central Stadium in Krasnoyarsk.

18 August 2018 4	CSKA Moscow	3 – 0	Arsenal Tula	Moscow
16:30 MSK (UTC+3)	Hernández 10'; Magnússon (yellow card) 70'; Bistrović 77'; Chalov 82'	Report	Khagush (yellow card) 37'; Đorđević (yellow card) 45+1'; Grigalava (red card) 67'; Mohammed (yellow card) 72'	Stadium: VEB Arena; Attendance: 15,948; Referee: Vladislav Bezborodov

25 August 2018 5	Rubin Kazan	1 – 1	CSKA Moscow	Kazan
16:30 MSK (UTC+3)	Poloz 10'; Azmoun (yellow card) 72'	Report	Becão (yellow card) 41'; Chalov 67'; Yefremov (yellow card) 74'; Bistrović (yellow card) 86'	Stadium: Kazan Arena; Attendance: 26,531; Referee: Vitali Meshkov

1 September 2018 6	CSKA Moscow	4 – 0	Ural Yekaterinburg	Moscow
16:30 MSK (UTC+3)	Chalov 13', 31', 85'; Chernov (yellow card) 29'; Bistrović 88'	Report	Bryzgalov (yellow card) 4'; Panyukov (yellow card) 33'; Boumal (penalty missed) 51'	Stadium: VEB Arena; Attendance: 19,119; Referee: Kirill Levnikov

15 September 2018 7	Ufa	0 – 3	CSKA Moscow	Ufa
16:30 MSK (UTC+3)	Paurević (yellow card) 47'; Sukhov (yellow card) 69'; Seidakhmet (yellow card) 85'	Report	Magnússon (yellow card) 13'; Chalov 45+2'; Zhamaletdinov 59', 63'	Stadium: Neftyanik Stadium; Attendance: 7,129; Referee: Sergey Lapochkin

23 September 2018 8	CSKA Moscow	1 – 1	Spartak Moscow	Moscow
19:00 MSK (UTC+3)	Becão (yellow card) 40'; Vlašić 63'; Chernov (yellow card) 90+1'; Nababkin (yellow card) 90+2'	Report	Fernando 30'; Samedov (yellow card) 40'	Stadium: VEB Arena; Attendance: 29,361; Referee: Sergei Karasev

28 September 2018 9	Orenburg	0 – 1	CSKA Moscow	Orenburg
17:30 MSK (UTC+3)	Afonin (yellow card) 30'; Sutormin (yellow card) 34'; Terekhov (yellow card) 39'; Kozlov (yellow card) 55'; Begić (yellow card) 77'; Chirkin (yellow card) 85'	Report	Chalov 32' (pen.); Bijol (yellow card) 42'	Stadium: Gazovik Stadium; Attendance: 6,917; Referee: Vladislav Bezborodov

7 October 2018 10	CSKA Moscow	0 – 1	Lokomotiv Moscow	Moscow
19:00 MSK (UTC+3)	Oblyakov (yellow card) 27'; Chernov (yellow card) 84'	Report	Eder (yellow card) 56' (yellow-red card) 65'; Ćorluka (yellow card) 66'; Krychowiak (yellow card) 70'; Höwedes 88'; Denisov (yellow card) 90+4'	Stadium: VEB Arena; Attendance: 22,275; Referee: Aleksei Matyunin

19 October 2018 11	Anzhi Makhachkala	0 – 2	CSKA Moscow	Kaspiysk
18:00 MSK (UTC+3)	Dolgov (yellow card) 17'; Gigolayev (yellow card) 39'; Glebov (yellow card) 60'; Ondoua (yellow card) 72'; Kulik (yellow card) 78'; Chaykovskyi (yellow card) 79'	Report	Vlašić 31'; Becão (yellow card) 36'; Chalov 71'	Stadium: Anzhi Arena; Attendance: 9,255; Referee: Vasiliy Kazartsev

28 October 2018 12	CSKA Moscow	1 – 2	Krasnodar	Moscow
19:00 MSK (UTC+3)	Chernov (yellow card) 27'; Vlašić 54'	Report	Ari 79'; Claesson 81'	Stadium: VEB Arena; Attendance: 19,063; Referee: Roman Galimov

3 November 2018 13	Dynamo Moscow	0 – 0	CSKA Moscow	Khimki
16:30 MSK (UTC+3)	Sow (yellow card) 10'; Rausch (yellow card) 14' (yellow-red card) 81'; Shunin (yellow card) 90+4'	Report	Becão (yellow card) 3'; Chalov (yellow card) 90'	Stadium: Arena Khimki; Attendance: 12,093; Referee: Aleksei Eskov

11 November 2018 14	CSKA Moscow	2 – 0	Zenit St.Petersburg	Moscow
19:00 MSK (UTC+3)	Chalov 15'; Sigurðsson 26'; Akhmetov (yellow card) 31'; Becão (yellow card) 38'	Report	Neto (yellow card) 37'; Zabolotny (yellow card) 84'	Stadium: VEB Arena; Attendance: 23,836; Referee: Vladimir Moskalyov

23 November 2018 15	Akhmat Grozny	0 – 2	CSKA Moscow	Grozny
18:00 MSK (UTC+3)	Ivanov (yellow card) 35'; Ismael (yellow card) 86'	Report	Bistrović (yellow card) 5'; Magnússon 57' (yellow card) 72'; Shchennikov (yellow card) 86'; Zhamaletdinov 90+6'	Stadium: Akhmat-Arena; Attendance: 7,218; Referee: Vladislav Bezborodov

2 December 2018 16	Rostov	0 – 0	CSKA Moscow	Rostov-on-Don
16:30 MSK (UTC+3)	Yusupov (yellow card) 49'; Zuyev (yellow card) 56'	Report	Vlašić (yellow card) 4' (penalty missed) 55'; Oblyakov (yellow card) 49' (yellow-red card) 89'; Shchennikov (yellow card) 64'	Stadium: Rostov Arena; Attendance: 32,182; Referee: Kirill Levnikov

8 December 2018 17	CSKA Moscow	2 – 1	Yenisey Krasnoyarsk	Moscow
15:00 MSK (UTC+3)	Shchennikov 4'; Vlašić 15'; Nababkin (yellow card) 61'	Report	Komolov 54'; Zotov (yellow card) 60'; Kichin (penalty missed) 62'; Torbinski (yellow card) 65'; Zanev (yellow card) 90+4'	Stadium: VEB Arena; Attendance: 9,013; Referee: Sergey Lapochkin

2 March 2019 18	Arsenal Tula	2 – 0	CSKA Moscow	Grozny
14:00 MSK (UTC+3)	Đorđević 48' (yellow card) 69'; Kostadinov (yellow card) 52'; Bakayev (yellow card) 54'; Kangwa 88'; Mirzov (yellow card) 90+3'	Report	Nababkin (yellow card) 32'; Sigurðsson (yellow card) 44'; Akhmetov (yellow card) 55'	Stadium: Akhmat-Arena; Attendance: 1,850; Referee: Evgeny Turbin
Note: Match moved to the Akhmat-Arena in Grozny due to the poor condition of the Arsenal Stadium pitch.

9 March 2019 19	CSKA Moscow	3 – 0	Rubin Kazan	Moscow
16:30 MSK (UTC+3)	Nishimura 24'; Chalov 83'; Diveyev (yellow card) 85'; Bijol 90+3'	Report	Kambolov (yellow card) 62'; Bashkirov (yellow card) 64'; Konovalov (yellow card) 74'	Stadium: VEB Arena; Attendance: 18,489; Referee: Kirill Levnikov

16 March 2019 20	Ural Yekaterinburg	0 – 1	CSKA Moscow	Yekaterinburg
14:00 MSK (UTC+3)	Boumal (yellow card) 20'	Report	Magnússon (yellow card) 15'; Diveyev (yellow card) 30'; Nababkin (yellow card) 55'; Fernandes 75'	Stadium: Central Stadium; Attendance: 17,113; Referee: Vladislav Bezborodov

31 March 2019 21	CSKA Moscow	2 – 2	Ufa	Moscow
16:30 MSK (UTC+3)	Vlašić 25'; Chalov 64'	Report	Jokić (yellow card) 26'; Thill (yellow card) 79'; Bizjak 87'; Igboun 90+3'	Stadium: VEB Arena; Attendance: 21,655; Referee: Sergey Ivanov

6 April 2019 22	Spartak Moscow	0 – 2	CSKA Moscow	Moscow
19:00 MSK (UTC+3)	Guliyev (yellow card) 63'; Dzhikiya (yellow card) 73'	Report	Sigurðsson 46', 55'; Becão (yellow card) 49'; Akhmetov (yellow card) 52'	Stadium: Otkritie Arena; Attendance: 44,486; Referee: Vitali Meshkov

13 April 2019 23	CSKA Moscow	2 – 3	Orenburg	Moscow
14:00 MSK (UTC+3)	Oblyakov 14'; Fernandes (yellow card) 19' (yellow-red card) 25'; Hernández 32'; Nishimura (yellow card) 74'; Sigurðsson (yellow card) 81'	Report	Popović (yellow card) 15'; Oyewole 18'; Sutormin 24'; Miškić (yellow card) 31'; Despotović 54' (yellow card) 79'; Malykh (yellow card) 69'; Frolov (yellow card) 90+5'	Stadium: VEB Arena; Attendance: 16,419; Referee: Sergey Lapochkin

20 April 2019 24	Lokomotiv Moscow	1 – 1	CSKA Moscow	Moscow
19:00 MSK (UTC+3)	Höwedes 13'; An.Miranchuk (yellow card) 34'; Ignatyev (yellow card) 42'; Krychowiak (yellow card) 58'; Idowu (yellow card) 65'	Report	Magnússon (yellow card) 23'; Chalov 40'; Becão (yellow card) 45+1'; Akhmetov (yellow card) 59'	Stadium: RZD Arena; Attendance: 26,892; Referee: Aleksei Eskov

24 April 2019 25	CSKA Moscow	2 – 0	Anzhi Makhachkala	Moscow
19:30 MSK (UTC+3)	Bijol 13'; Akhmetov (yellow card) 36'; Sigurðsson 55'	Report	Gapon (yellow card) 10'; Udaly (yellow card) 84'	Stadium: VEB Arena; Attendance: 12,712; Referee: Vladimir Moskalyov

28 April 2019 26	Krasnodar	2 – 0	CSKA Moscow	Krasnodar
19:00 MSK (UTC+3)	Utkin 7'; Ignatyev (yellow card) 34'; Kaboré (yellow card) 41'; Pereyra (yellow card) 44'; Stotsky 55'	Report	Oblyakov (yellow card) 25'; Vlašić (yellow card) 45+2' (yellow-red card) 88'	Stadium: Krasnodar Stadium; Attendance: 33,517; Referee: Sergey Ivanov

5 May 2019 27	CSKA Moscow	2 – 2	Dynamo Moscow	Moscow
16:30 MSK (UTC+3)	Bijol 28'; Magnússon (yellow card) 65'; Nishimura 85'; Becão (yellow card) 88'	Report	Cardoso (yellow card) 32' (goal) 35'; Panchenko 43'; Yevgenyev (yellow card) 89'	Stadium: VEB Arena; Attendance: 24,482; Referee: Sergei Karasev

12 May 2019 28	Zenit St.Petersburg	3 – 1	CSKA Moscow	Saint Petersburg
19:00 MSK (UTC+3)	Rakitskiy (yellow card) 32'; Driussi 38', 86'; Zhirkov (yellow card) 50'; Rigoni 62'; Dzyuba (yellow card) 73'; Nabiullin (yellow card) 84'	Report	Bijol (yellow card) 4'; Akhmetov (yellow card) 7'; Oblyakov 30'; Vlašić (yellow card) 32'; Shchennikov (yellow card) 70'	Stadium: Krestovsky Stadium; Attendance: 61,494; Referee: Evgeny Turbin

18 May 2019 29	CSKA Moscow	1 – 0	Akhmat Grozny	Moscow
16:30 MSK (UTC+3)	Vasin (yellow card) 6'; Diveyev (yellow card) 11'; Magnússon (yellow card) 50'; Chalov 64' (pen.); Sigurðsson (yellow card) 67'	Report	Pliyev (yellow card) 39'; Shvets (yellow card) 48'; Nižić (yellow card) 74'; Utsiyev (yellow card) 90+1'	Stadium: VEB Arena; Attendance: 15,813; Referee: Kirill Levnikov

26 May 2019 30	CSKA Moscow	6 – 0	Krylia Sovetov	Moscow
14:00 MSK (UTC+3)	Chalov 4', 73'; Magnússon 48'; Bijol 52'; Sigurðsson 56'; Oblyakov 80'	Report		Stadium: VEB Arena; Attendance: 22,053; Referee: Vitali Meshkov

==== League table ====
Pos	Team	Pld	W	D	L	GF	GA	GD	Pts	Qualification or relegation
2	Lokomotiv Moscow	30	16	8	6	45	28	+17	56 (Note: Head-to-head away goals: Lokomotiv 1, Krasnodar 0.)	Qualification for the Champions League group stage
3	Krasnodar	30	16	8	6	55	23	+32	56	Qualification for the Champions League third qualifying round
4	CSKA Moscow	30	14	9	7	46	23	+23	51	Qualification for the Europa League group stage (Note: Lokomotiv Moscow won the 2018–19 Russian Cup. As they already qualified for the Champions League, the Europa League group stage spot (originally designated for the Cup winner) goes to the fourth-placed team, third qualifying round spot goes to fifth-placed team and second qualifying round spot goes to sixth-placed team.)
5	Spartak Moscow	30	14	7	9	36	31	+5	49	Qualification for the Europa League third qualifying round
6	Arsenal Tula	30	12	10	8	40	33	+7	46	Qualification for the Europa League second qualifying round

Updated to match(es) played on 26 May 2019. Source: Russian Premier League, Soccerway
Rules for classification: 1) Points; 2) Head-to-head points; 3) Head-to-head matches won; 4) Head-to-head goal difference; 5) Head-to-head goals scored; 6) Head-to-head away goals; 7) Matches won; 8) Goal difference; 9) Goals scored; 10) Away goals scored; 11) Play-off.

=== Russian Cup ===
9 October 2018 Round of 32	Tyumen	1 – 1 (a.e.t.) (3 – 0 p)	CSKA Moscow	Tyumen
17:00 MSK (UTC+3)	Kozlov (yellow card) 61'; Votinov (yellow card) 106'; Stolyarenko 120'	Report	Yefremov (yellow card) 40'; Pukhov (yellow card) 52' (goal) 108'; Nishimura (yellow card) 118'	Stadium: Geolog Stadium; Attendance: 10,400; Referee: Sergey Ivanov
	Penalties
	Chudin (penalty scored); Ryabokobylenko (penalty scored); Leshonok (penalty scored)		Gordyushenko (penalty missed); Pukhov (penalty missed); Nishimura (penalty missed)

=== UEFA Champions League ===
==== Group stage ====
Pos	Team	Pld	W	D	L	GF	GA	GD	Pts	Qualification
1	(Spain) Real Madrid	6	4	0	2	12	5	+7	12	Advance to knockout phase
2	(Italy) Roma	6	3	0	3	11	8	+3	9	Advance to knockout phase
3	(Czech Republic) Viktoria Plzeň	6	2	1	3	7	16	−9	7 (Note: Head-to-head points: Viktoria Plzeň 4, CSKA Moscow 1.)	Transfer to Europa League
4	(Russia) CSKA Moscow	6	2	1	3	8	9	−1	7	

Source: UEFA
Rules for classification: Group stage tiebreakers
Notes:

19 September 2018 1	Viktoria Plzeň (Czech Republic)	2 – 2	(Russia) CSKA Moscow	Plzeň, Czech Republic
22:00 MSK (UTC+3)	Krmenčík 29', 41'; Hubník (yellow card) 80'; Řezníček (yellow card) 86'; Limberský (yellow card) 90+6'	Report	Yefremov (yellow card) 4'; Chalov 49'; Akhmetov (yellow card) 68'; Bijol (yellow card) 73'; Sigurðsson (yellow card) 82'; Becão (yellow card) 86'; Vlašić 90+5' (pen.)	Stadium: Doosan Arena; Attendance: 11,312; Referee: Benoît Bastien (France)

2 October 2018 2	CSKA Moscow (Russia)	1 – 0	(Spain) Real Madrid	Moscow, Russia
22:00 MSK (UTC+3)	Vlašić 2'; Bijol (yellow card) 66'; Oblyakov (yellow card) 90+3'; Akinfeev (yellow card) 90+6' (yellow-red card) 90+6'	Report		Stadium: Luzhniki Stadium; Attendance: 71,811; Referee: Ovidiu Hațegan (Romania)
Note: CSKA Moscow will play their home matches at the Luzhniki Stadium instead of their regular stadium VEB Arena, Moscow.

23 October 2018 3	Roma (Italy)	3 – 0	(Russia) CSKA Moscow	Rome, Italy
22:00 MSK (UTC+3)	Džeko 30', 43'; Ünder 50'	Report	Nababkin (yellow card) 71'; Sigurðsson (yellow card) 88'	Stadium: Stadio Olimpico; Attendance: 46,005; Referee: Anastasios Sidiropoulos (Greece)

7 November 2018 4	CSKA Moscow (Russia)	1 – 2	(Italy) Roma	Moscow, Russia
20:55 MSK (UTC+3)	Magnússon (yellow card) 30' (yellow-red card) 56'; Sigurðsson 50'	Report	Manolas 4'; Lo.Pellegrini 59'	Stadium: Luzhniki Stadium; Attendance: 64,454; Referee: Cüneyt Çakır (Turkey)
Note: CSKA Moscow will play their home matches at the Luzhniki Stadium instead of their regular stadium VEB Arena, Moscow.

27 November 2018 5	CSKA Moscow (Russia)	1 – 2	(Czech Republic) Viktoria Plzeň	Moscow, Russia
20:55 MSK (UTC+3)	Vlašić 10' (pen.); Oblyakov (yellow card) 13'; Chalov (yellow card) 24'	Report	Hubník (yellow card) 36'; Procházka (penalty missed) 44' 56'; Hrošovský (yellow card) 60'; Hejda 81'; Kopic (yellow card) 90+2'	Stadium: Luzhniki Stadium; Attendance: 52,892; Referee: Danny Makkelie (Netherlands)
Note: CSKA Moscow will play their home matches at the Luzhniki Stadium instead of their regular stadium VEB Arena, Moscow.

12 December 2018 6	Real Madrid (Spain)	0 – 3	(Russia) CSKA Moscow	Madrid, Spain
20:55 MSK (UTC+3)	Valverde (yellow card) 90+3'	Report	Chalov 37'; Shchennikov 43' (yellow card) 78'; Sigurðsson 73'	Stadium: Santiago Bernabéu; Attendance: 51,636; Referee: Artur Soares Dias (Portugal)

== Squad statistics ==
As of match played 26 May 2019

=== Appearances and goals ===
No.	Pos	Nat	Player	Total		Premier League		Russian Cup		Super Cup		Champions League	
No.	Pos	Nat	Player	Apps	Goals	Apps	Goals	Apps	Goals	Apps	Goals	Apps	Goals
1	GK	(Russia) RUS	Ilya Pomazun	2	0	0	0	1	0	0	0	1	0
2	DF	(Russia) RUS	Mário Fernandes	35	1	28	1	0	0	1	0	6	0
3	DF	(Russia) RUS	Nikita Chernov	17	0	10+1	0	0	0	1	0	4+1	0
5	DF	(Russia) RUS	Viktor Vasin	6	0	4+2	0	0	0	0	0	0	0
8	MF	(Croatia) CRO	Nikola Vlašić	31	8	25	5	0	0	0	0	6	3
9	FW	(Russia) RUS	Fyodor Chalov	37	17	27+3	15	0	0	1	0	6	2
10	MF	(Russia) RUS	Alan Dzagoev	11	0	6+1	0	0	0	1	0	2+1	0
11	FW	(Uruguay) URU	Abel Hernández	15	3	5+9	3	0	0	0	0	0+1	0
14	DF	(Russia) RUS	Kirill Nababkin	33	0	23+2	0	1	0	1	0	6	0
15	MF	(Russia) RUS	Dmitry Yefremov	19	0	6+8	0	1	0	1	0	1+2	0
17	MF	(Iceland) ISL	Arnór Sigurðsson	27	7	14+7	5	0	0	0	0	4+2	2
19	FW	(Japan) JPN	Takuma Nishimura	15	2	4+8	2	1	0	0	0	0+2	0
20	MF	(Russia) RUS	Konstantin Kuchayev	5	0	0+3	0	0	0	0	0	0+2	0
22	GK	(Russia) RUS	Georgi Kyrnats	1	0	0	0	0	0	0	0	0+1	0
23	DF	(Iceland) ISL	Hörður Magnússon	27	2	22+1	2	0	0	1	0	3	0
25	MF	(Croatia) CRO	Kristijan Bistrović	23	2	12+8	2	0	0	1	0	2	0
29	MF	(Slovenia) SVN	Jaka Bijol	27	4	12+11	4	0	0	0+1	0	3	0
35	GK	(Russia) RUS	Igor Akinfeev	36	0	30	0	0	0	1	0	5	0
42	DF	(Russia) RUS	Georgi Shchennikov	24	2	16+4	1	0	0	0+1	0	2+1	1
47	MF	(Russia) RUS	Anatoli Anisimov	1	0	0	0	0+1	0	0	0	0	0
50	DF	(Brazil) BRA	Rodrigo Becão	36	0	28	0	1	0	1	0	6	0
71	MF	(Russia) RUS	Nayair Tiknizyan	1	0	0	0	1	0	0	0	0	0
77	MF	(Russia) RUS	Ilzat Akhmetov	30	0	21+5	0	0	0	0	0	3+1	0
78	DF	(Russia) RUS	Igor Diveyev	10	0	10	0	0	0	0	0	0	0
90	DF	(Russia) RUS	Semyon Matviychuk	1	0	0	0	1	0	0	0	0	0
98	MF	(Russia) RUS	Ivan Oblyakov	29	3	22+1	3	0	0	0	0	6	0
Players away from the club on loan:
72	MF	(Russia) RUS	Astemir Gordyushenko	3	0	0+2	0	1	0	0	0	0	0
75	FW	(Russia) RUS	Timur Zhamaletdinov	16	3	4+8	3	1	0	1	0	0+2	0
80	MF	(Russia) RUS	Khetag Khosonov	8	1	1+4	0	0	0	0+1	1	0+2	0
82	MF	(Russia) RUS	Ivan Oleynikov	1	0	0	0	1	0	0	0	0	0
Players who left CSKA Moscow during the season:
11	FW	(Brazil) BRA	Vitinho	1	0	0	0	0	0	1	0	0	0
70	MF	(Russia) RUS	Timur Pukhov	1	1	0	0	1	1	0	0	0	0
78	DF	(Russia) RUS	Ivan Maklakov	1	0	0	0	0+1	0	0	0	0	0

=== Goal Scorers ===
Place	Position	Nation	Number	Name	Premier League	Russian Cup	Super Cup	Champions League	Total
1	FW	(Russia)	9	Fyodor Chalov	15	0	0	2	17
2	MF	(Croatia)	8	Nikola Vlašić	5	0	0	3	8
3	MF	(Iceland)	17	Arnór Sigurðsson	5	0	0	2	7
4	MF	(Slovenia)	29	Jaka Bijol	4	0	0	0	4
5	FW	(Uruguay)	11	Abel Hernández	3	0	0	0	3
5	FW	(Russia)	75	Timur Zhamaletdinov	3	0	0	0	3
5	MF	(Russia)	98	Ivan Oblyakov	3	0	0	0	3
8	MF	(Croatia)	25	Kristijan Bistrović	2	0	0	0	2
8	FW	(Japan)	19	Takuma Nishimura	2	0	0	0	2
8	DF	(Iceland)	23	Hörður Magnússon	2	0	0	0	2
8	DF	(Russia)	42	Georgi Shchennikov	1	0	0	1	2
12	DF	(Russia)	2	Mário Fernandes	1	0	0	0	1
12	MF	(Russia)	70	Timur Pukhov	0	1	0	0	1
12	MF	(Russia)	80	Khetag Khosonov	0	0	1	0	1
				TOTALS	46	1	1	8	56

=== Disciplinary record ===
Number	Nation	Position	Name	Premier League		Russian Cup		Super Cup		Champions League		Total	
Number	Nation	Position	Name	Booked	Sent off (straight red)	Booked	Sent off (straight red)	Booked	Sent off (straight red)	Booked	Sent off (straight red)	Booked	Sent off (straight red)
2	(Russia)	DF	Mário Fernandes	2	1	0	0	0	0	0	0	2	1
3	(Russia)	DF	Nikita Chernov	5	0	0	0	1	0	0	0	6	0
5	(Russia)	DF	Viktor Vasin	1	0	0	0	0	0	0	0	1	0
8	(Croatia)	MF	Nikola Vlašić	4	1	0	0	0	0	0	0	4	1
9	(Russia)	FW	Fyodor Chalov	1	0	0	0	0	0	1	0	2	0
14	(Russia)	DF	Kirill Nababkin	5	1	0	0	0	0	1	0	6	1
15	(Russia)	MF	Dmitry Yefremov	1	0	1	0	0	0	1	0	3	0
17	(Iceland)	MF	Arnór Sigurðsson	3	0	0	0	0	0	2	0	5	0
19	(Japan)	FW	Takuma Nishimura	1	0	1	0	0	0	1	0	4	0
23	(Iceland)	DF	Hörður Magnússon	7	0	0	0	0	0	2	1	9	1
25	(Croatia)	MF	Kristijan Bistrović	2	0	0	0	1	0	0	0	3	0
29	(Slovenia)	MF	Jaka Bijol	3	0	0	0	0	0	2	0	5	0
35	(Russia)	GK	Igor Akinfeev	0	0	0	0	0	0	2	1	2	1
42	(Russia)	DF	Georgi Shchennikov	3	0	0	0	0	0	1	0	4	0
50	(Brazil)	DF	Rodrigo Becão	8	0	0	0	0	0	1	0	9	0
77	(Russia)	MF	Ilzat Akhmetov	7	0	0	0	0	0	1	0	8	0
78	(Russia)	DF	Igor Diveyev	3	0	0	0	0	0	0	0	3	0
98	(Russia)	MF	Ivan Oblyakov	4	1	0	0	0	0	2	0	6	1
Players who left CSKA Moscow during the season:
70	(Russia)	MF	Timur Pukhov	0	0	1	0	0	0	1	0	3	0
			TOTALS	60	4	3	0	2	0	16	2	81	6
