= 2016–17 PFC CSKA Moscow season =

CSKA
2016–17 season
- Chairman: Yevgeni Giner
- Manager: Leonid Slutsky (until 7 December 2016); Viktor Goncharenko (from 12 December 2016)
- Stadium: Arena CSKA
- Premier League: 2nd
- Russian Cup: Round of 32
- Super Cup: Runners-up
- Champions League: Group stage
- Top goalscorer: League: Three Players (6); All: Bibras Natcho (7)
- Highest home attendance: 27,352 vs Spartak Moscow (30 April 2017)
- Lowest home attendance: 5,000 vs Orenburg (30 November 2016)
- Average home league attendance: 15,903 (21 May 2017)
Home colours	Away colours

The 2016–17 CSKA season was the 25th successive season that the club played in the Russian Premier League, the highest tier of association football in Russia. CSKA were defending Russian Premier League champions, and as a result will enter the Champions League at the Groups stage, and also take part in the Russian Cup. They finished the season in second place, behind Spartak Moscow, were knocked out of the Russian Cup by Yenisey Krasnoyarsk and finished fourth in their Champions League group that contained AS Monaco, Bayer Leverkusen and Tottenham Hotspur.

== Season events ==
On 6 October 2016, Finland announced that Roman Eremenko had been handed a 30-day ban from football by UEFA, with UEFA announcing on 18 November 2016, that Eremenko had been handed a 2-year ban from football due to testing positive for cocaine.

On 2 December 2016, Golovin extended his contract with CSKA Moscow until the end of the 2020–21 season.

On 6 December 2016, CSKA announced that manager Leonid Slutsky would leave the club after seven years at the club, following their last game of 2016, away to Tottenham Hotspur. 6 days later, 12 December, Viktor Goncharenko was announced as the club's new manager, signing a two-year contract.

== Squad ==
As of match played 21 May 2016

Number	Name	Nationality	Position	Date of birth (age)	Signed from	Signed in	Contract ends	Apps.	Goals
Goalkeepers
1	Sergei Chepchugov	(Russia)	GK	15 July 1985 (aged 31)	Sibir Novosibirsk	2010		28	0
35	Igor Akinfeev (captain)	(Russia)	GK	8 April 1986 (aged 31)	Academy	2003	2019	520	0
44	Georgi Kyrnats	(Russia)	GK	22 June 1998 (aged 18)	Academy	2015		0	0
45	Ilya Pomazun	(Russia)	GK	16 August 1996 (aged 20)	Academy	2012		0	0
77	Dmitri Gerasimov	(Russia)	GK	16 February 1999 (aged 18)	Academy	2015		0	0
84	Pavel Ovchinnikov	(Russia)	GK	24 March 1998 (aged 19)	Academy	2015		0	0
95	Maksim Yedapin	(Russia)	GK	3 April 2000 (aged 17)	Academy	2015		0	0
Defenders
2	Mário Fernandes	(Brazil)	DF	19 September 1990 (aged 26)	Grêmio	2012	2022	164	2
4	Sergei Ignashevich	(Russia)	DF	14 July 1979 (aged 37)	Lokomotiv Moscow	2004		504	43
5	Viktor Vasin	(Russia)	DF	6 October 1988 (aged 28)	Spartak Nalchik	2011		28	0
6	Aleksei Berezutski	(Russia)	DF	20 June 1982 (aged 34)	Chernomorets Novorossiysk	2001		472	10
14	Kirill Nababkin	(Russia)	DF	8 September 1986 (aged 30)	Moscow	2010		173	3
24	Vasili Berezutski	(Russia)	DF	20 June 1982 (aged 34)	Torpedo-ZIL	2002		491	13
42	Georgi Shchennikov	(Russia)	DF	27 April 1991 (aged 26)	Academy	2008		251	1
55	Mutalip Alibekov	(Russia)	DF	18 June 1997 (aged 19)	Academy	2014		1	0
62	Aleksandar Stanisavljević	(Serbia)	DF	27 January 1998 (aged 19)	Academy	2015		0	0
73	Ivan Maklakov	(Russia)	DF	17 April 1998 (aged 19)	Academy	2015		0	0
98	Danil Neplyuyev	(Russia)	DF	2 January 1998 (aged 19)	Academy	2016		0	0
Midfielder
3	Pontus Wernbloom	(Sweden)	MF	25 June 1986 (aged 30)	AZ Alkmaar	2012	2016	186	14
7	Zoran Tošić	(Serbia)	MF	28 April 1987 (aged 30)	Manchester United	2010	2015	243	47
8	Georgi Milanov	(Bulgaria)	MF	19 January 1992 (aged 25)	Litex Lovech	2013	2018	124	6
10	Alan Dzagoev	(Russia)	MF	17 June 1990 (aged 26)	Krylia Sovetov-SOK Dimitrovgrad	2008		294	68
11	Aleksei Ionov	(Russia)	MF	18 February 1989 (aged 28)	loan from Dynamo Moscow	2016	2017	29	3
17	Aleksandr Golovin	(Russia)	MF	30 May 1996 (aged 20)	Academy	2014		70	6
47	Anatoli Anisimov	(Russia)	MF	23 May 1998 (aged 18)	Rubin Kazan	2016		0	0
61	Kirill Leonov	(Russia)	MF	26 July 1998 (aged 18)	Academy	2015		0	0
66	Bibras Natcho	(Israel)	MF	18 February 1988 (aged 29)	Rubin Kazan	2013		97	22
70	Timur Pukhov	(Russia)	MF	17 June 1998 (aged 18)	Academy	2015		0	0
72	Astemir Gordyushenko	(Russia)	MF	30 March 1997 (aged 20)	Academy	2014		6	0
80	Khetag Khosonov	(Russia)	MF	18 June 1998 (aged 18)	Yunost Vladikavkaz	2014		1	0
82	Ivan Oleynikov	(Russia)	MF	24 August 1998 (aged 18)	Academy	2015		0	0
89	Konstantin Kuchayev	(Russia)	MF	10 March 1998 (aged 19)	Academy	2015		2	0
Forwards
11	Vitinho	(Brazil)	FW	21 October 1994 (aged 22)	Botafogo	2013	2018	37	7
17	Alibek Aliev	(Sweden)	FW	16 August 1996 (aged 20)	IF Elfsborg	2015	2020	0	0
63	Fyodor Chalov	(Russia)	FW	10 April 1998 (aged 19)	Academy	2015		18	6
75	Timur Zhamaletdinov	(Russia)	FW	21 May 1997 (aged 20)	Academy	2014		4	0
99	Aaron Samuel	(Nigeria)	FW	4 June 1994 (aged 22)	loan from Guangzhou R&F	2016	2016	17	3
Banned
25	Roman Eremenko	(Finland)	MF	19 March 1987 (aged 29)	Rubin Kazan	2013		80	20
Away on loan
15	Dmitry Yefremov	(Russia)	MF	5 February 1994 (aged 23)	Akademiya Tolyatti	2012		34	0
71	Konstantin Bazelyuk	(Russia)	FW	12 April 1993 (aged 24)	Academy	2010		27	4
91	Nikita Chernov	(Russia)	DF	14 January 1996 (aged 21)	Academy	2014		3	0
	Sergei Tkachyov	(Russia)	MF	19 May 1989 (aged 28)	Kuban Krasnodar	2016	2019	11	0
	Kirill Panchenko	(Russia)	FW	16 October 1989 (aged 27)	Tom Tomsk	2014	2019	41	5
Players that left during the season
9	Lacina Traoré	(Ivory Coast)	FW	20 May 1990 (aged 27)	AS Monaco	2016	2017	21	6
49	Nikita Titov	(Russia)	MF	14 March 1996 (aged 21)	Academy	2013		0	0
59	Roman Krivulkin	(Belarus)	DF	18 February 1996 (aged 21)	Academy	2015		0	0
73	Sergei Yevtushenko	(Serbia)	DF	8 May 1997 (aged 20)	Academy	2015		0	0
79	Ilya Ferapontov	(Russia)	FW	19 April 1997 (aged 20)	Academy	2013		0	0
97	Carlos Strandberg	(Sweden)	FW	14 April 1996 (aged 21)	BK Häcken	2015	2020	28	5

=== Out on loan ===
Note: Flags indicate national team as defined under FIFA eligibility rules; some limited exceptions apply. Players may hold more than one non-FIFA nationality.

No.	Pos.	Nation	Player
—	DF	RUS	Nikita Chernov (at Yenisey Krasnoyarsk)
—	MF	RUS	Sergei Tkachyov (at Krylia Sovetov Samara)
—	MF	RUS	Dmitri Yefremov (at Orenburg)

No.	Pos.	Nation	Player
—	FW	RUS	Konstantin Bazelyuk (at Estoril)
—	FW	RUS	Kirill Panchenko (at Dynamo Moscow)

== Transfers ==
=== In ===
Date	Position	Nationality	Name	From	Fee	Ref.
3 August 2016	DF	(Russia)	Sergei Yevtushenko	Dynamo-2 Moscow	Undisclosed	
1 January 2017	DF	(Russia)	Semyon Matviychuk	Dynamo-2 Moscow	Undisclosed	
1 January 2017	DF	(Russia)	Saveliy Kozlov	Unattached	Free	
1 January 2017	FW	(Latvia)	Oskars Rubenis	Rīgas Futbola skola	Undisclosed	
28 January 2017	FW	(Nigeria)	Aaron Olanare	Guangzhou R&F	Undisclosed	

=== Out ===
Date	Position	Nationality	Name	To	Fee	Ref.
23 June 2016	DF	(Russia)	Pyotr Ten	Tom Tomsk	Undisclosed	
23 June 2016	FW	(Russia)	Nikolai Dergachyov	Sokol Saratov	Undisclosed	
23 June 2016	FW	(Russia)	Armen Ambartsumyan	Mordovia Saransk	Undisclosed	
1 July 2016	MF	(Russia)	Dmitri Sokolov	Kaluga	Undisclosed	
8 July 2016	FW	(Nigeria)	Ahmed Musa	Leicester City	Undisclosed	
18 July 2016	MF	(Russia)	Aleksandr Ektov	Dolgoprudny	Undisclosed	
16 August 2016	DF	(Russia)	Vyacheslav Karavayev	Sparta Prague	Undisclosed	
1 January 2017	DF	(Russia)	Sergei Yevtushenko	Veles Moscow	Undisclosed	
5 January 2017	FW	(Sweden)	Carlos Strandberg	Club Brugge	Undisclosed	
6 February 2017	GK	(Russia)	Dmitri Gerasimov	Anzhi Makhachkala	Undisclosed	
8 February 2017	FW	(Russia)	Ilya Ferapontov	Narva Trans	Undisclosed	
17 February 2017	MF	(Russia)	Nikita Titov	Metallurg Lipetsk	Undisclosed	

=== Loans in ===
Date from	Position	Nationality	Name	From	Date to	Ref.
24 June 2016	MF	(Russia)	Aleksei Ionov	Dynamo Moscow	Season Long	
13 July 2016	FW	(Ivory Coast)	Lacina Traoré	Monaco	31 January 2017	

=== Loans out ===
Date from	Position	Nationality	Name	To	Date to	Ref.
6 June 2016	MF	(Russia)	Aleksandr Makarov	Tosno	End of Season	
9 June 2016	MF	(Russia)	Dmitri Yefremov	Orenburg	End of Season	
16 June 2016	FW	(Russia)	Kirill Panchenko	Dynamo Moscow	End of Season	
24 June 2016	MF	(Russia)	Sergei Tkachyov	Krylia Sovetov	End of Season	
24 June 2016	DF	(Russia)	Nikita Chernov	Yenisey Krasnoyarsk	End of Season	
27 June 2016	FW	(Russia)	Konstantin Bazelyuk	Estoril	End of Season	
1 July 2016	DF	(Russia)	Viktor Vasin	Ufa	15 December 2016	
27 July 2016	FW	(Sweden)	Alibek Aliev	GAIS	31 December 2016	

=== Released ===
Date	Position	Nationality	Name	Joined	Date
20 June 2016	MF	(Russia)	Amir Natkho	Krasnodar	
23 June 2016	DF	(Russia)	Denis Masyutin	Zenit Penza	
23 June 2016	MF	(Russia)	Renat Yusupov	Ufa	
13 July 2016	MF	(Russia)	Roman Shirokov	Retired	
11 January 2017	MF	(Latvia)	Aleksandrs Cauņa	RFS	31 March 2017
23 May 2017	GK	(Russia)	Sergei Chepchugov	Yenisey Krasnoyarsk	14 June 2017
23 May 2017	FW	(Russia)	Kirill Panchenko	Dynamo Moscow	

== Friendlies ==
21 January 2017	CSKA Moscow	3 – 0	Wohlen	Campoamor, Spain
17:30 MSK (UTC+3)	Ionov 32', 48'; Zhamaletdinov 65'	Summary

22 January 2017	CSKA Moscow	2 – 0	Piast Gliwice	Campoamor, Spain
14:00 MSK (UTC+3)	Zhamaletdinov 33'; Ignashevich 90' (pen.)	Summary

29 January 2017	CSKA Moscow	4 – 0	Horsens	Campoamor, Spain
17:30 MSK (UTC+3)	Fernandes 24'; Chalov 39', 78'; Ionov 50'	Summary

2 February 2017	CSKA Moscow	0 – 0	Viktoria Plzeň	Spain
18:00 MSK (UTC+3)		Summary

6 February 2017	CSKA Moscow	0 – 0	Esbjerg	Campoamor, Spain
17:30 MSK (UTC+3)		Summary

7 February 2017	CSKA Moscow	1 – 0	LASK Linz	Campoamor, Spain
14:00 MSK (UTC+3)	Gordyushenko 51'	Summary

15 February 2017	Cartagena	1 – 2	CSKA Moscow	Cartagena Spain
20:00 MSK (UTC+3)	Arturo 18'	Summary	Dzagoev 68'; Chalov 90'	Stadium: Ciudad Deportiva Gómez Meseguer

19 February 2017	CSKA Moscow	3 – 1	Sarpsborg 08	La Manga Club, Spain
18:00 MSK (UTC+3)	Fernandes 47'; Dzagoev 53'; Golovin 64'	Summary

22 February 2017	CSKA Moscow	1 – 0	Ufa	Campoamor, Spain
17:30 MSK (UTC+3)	Golovin 28'	Summary

25 February 2017	CSKA Moscow	3 – 0	Bodø/Glimt	La Manga Club, Spain
18:00 MSK (UTC+3)	Chalov 49'; Ionov 81'; Vitinho 84'	Summary

== Competitions ==
=== Russian Super Cup ===
23 July 2016	CSKA Moscow	0 – 1	Zenit St.Petersburg	Moscow
19:00 MSK (UTC+3)	Natcho (yellow card) 61'; Wernbloom (yellow card) 62'; Tošić (yellow card) 62'	Summary	Kokorin (yellow card) 45'; Maurício 22' (yellow card) 62'; Shatov (yellow card) 62'; Lodigin (yellow card) 76'	Stadium: Lokomotiv Stadium; Attendance: 22,000; Referee: Sergei Karasev

=== Russian Premier League ===
==== Results by round ====
Round	1	2	3	4	5	6	7	8	9	10	11	12	13	14	15	16	17	18	19	20	21	22	23	24	25	26	27	28	29	30
Ground	A	A	A	A	A	H	A	H	A	H	A	A	H	A	H	H	H	H	H	A	H	A	H	A	H	H	A	H	A	H
Result	D	W	W	D	W	W	W	D	L	W	L	L	D	W	D	W	W	D	W	W	W	D	D	W	W	L	W	W	W	W
Position	6	4	3	3	2	2	2	2	3	3	3	3	4	3	4	3	3	3	2	2	2	2	2	2	2	3	2	2	2	2

Updated to match(es) played on 21 May 2017. Source: See results
A = Away; H = Home; W = Win; D = Draw; L = Loss

==== Matches ====
30 July 2016 1	Anzhi Makhachkala	0 – 0	CSKA Moscow	Kaspiysk
20:00 MSK (UTC+3)	Boli (yellow card) 68'; Zhirov (yellow card) 82'	Summary		Stadium: Anzhi Arena; Attendance: 16,500; Referee: Vitali Meshkov

7 August 2016 2	Orenburg	0 – 1	CSKA Moscow	Orenburg
15:00 MSK (UTC+3)	Afonin (yellow card) 57'; Vorobyov (yellow card) 83'	Summary	Eremenko 84'; Ignashevich (yellow card) 90+2'	Stadium: Gazovik Stadium; Attendance: 5,600; Referee: Alexander Yegorov

13 August 2016 3	Ural	0 – 1	CSKA Moscow	Yekaterinburg
15:30 MSK (UTC+3)	Lungu (yellow card) 19'	Summary	Milanov 90+4'	Stadium: SKB-Bank Arena; Attendance: 8,800; Referee: Kirill Levnikov

20 August 2016 4	Zenit St.Petersburg	1 – 1	CSKA Moscow	Saint Petersburg
17:00 MSK (UTC+3)	García (yellow card) 41'; Zhirkov 45'; Shatov (yellow card) 61'	Summary	Ignashevich (yellow card) 21'; Eremenko 24'; Wernbloom (yellow card) 27'; Milanov (yellow card) 41'	Stadium: Petrovsky Stadium; Attendance: 17,678; Referee: Sergei Ivanov

27 August 2016 5	Tom Tomsk	0 – 1	CSKA Moscow	Tomsk
15:30 MSK (UTC+3)	Tishkin (yellow card) 72'; Popov (yellow card) 80'; Pugin (red card) 90+3'	Summary	Eremenko 54'; Shchennikov (yellow card) 67'; Dzagoev (yellow card) 77'	Stadium: Trud Stadium; Attendance: 8.250; Referee: Mikhail Vilkov

9 September 2016 6	CSKA Moscow	3 – 0	Terek Grozny	Moscow
20:30 MSK (UTC+3)	Traoré 26', 38'; Wernbloom (yellow card) 45'; Strandberg 76'	Summary	Semyonov (yellow card) 45' (yellow-red card) 59'	Stadium: Arena CSKA; Attendance: 26,420; Referee: Vitali Meshkov

18 September 2016 7	Krylia Sovetov	1 – 2	CSKA Moscow	Samara
17:15 MSK (UTC+3)	Yatchenko 45'; Bateau (yellow card) 48'	Summary	Golovin 7'; Ignashevich 77'; Wernbloom (yellow card) 80'	Stadium: Metallurg Stadium; Attendance: 11,083; Referee: Vladislav Bezborodov

24 September 2016 8	CSKA Moscow	1 – 1	Krasnodar	Moscow
17:00 MSK (UTC+3)	Traoré 3' (yellow card) 40'; Wernbloom (yellow card) 74'	Summary	Smolov 15'; Laborde (yellow card) 84'	Stadium: Arena CSKA; Attendance: 14,080; Referee: Sergey Ivanov

2 October 2016 9	Rostov	2 – 0	CSKA Moscow	Rostov-on-Don
21:30 MSK (UTC+3)	Mevlja (yellow card) 39'; Gațcan 66'; Noboa 90+3'	Summary	Tošić (yellow card) 41'; Ignashevich (yellow card) 52'	Stadium: Olimp-2; Attendance: 14,150; Referee: Alexander Yegorov

14 October 2016 10	CSKA Moscow	1 – 0	Ufa	Moscow
19:30 MSK (UTC+3)	Golovin (yellow card) 10'; Berezutski 18'; Wernbloom (yellow card) 51'; Tošić (yellow card) 59'	Summary	Bezdenezhnykh (yellow card) 24'; Krotov (yellow card) 69'	Stadium: Arena CSKA; Attendance: 9,800; Referee: Mikhail Vilkov

23 October 2016 11	Lokomotiv Moscow	1 – 0	CSKA Moscow	Moscow
16:30 MSK (UTC+3)	Maicon 65' (yellow card) 84'; Denisov (yellow card) 90+4'	Summary	Golovin (yellow card) 72'	Stadium: Lokomotiv Stadium; Attendance: 17,130; Referee: Sergei Karasev

29 October 2016 12	Spartak Moscow	3 – 1	CSKA Moscow	Moscow
18:00 MSK (UTC+3)	Glushakov 19'; Zé Luís 76', 89'	Summary	Strandberg 82'	Stadium: Otkrytiye Arena; Attendance: 44,884; Referee: Alexey Nikolaev

6 November 2016 13	CSKA Moscow	2 – 2	Amkar Perm	Moscow
19:00 MSK (UTC+3)	Ignashevich 18' (pen.); Tošić 45+1'; Strandberg (yellow card) 57'; Wernbloom (yellow card) 64'	Summary	Dzhikiya 25'; Kostyukov 27'; Balanovich (yellow card) 63'; Gol (yellow card) 64'; Ogude (yellow card) 74' (yellow-red card) 90+2'	Stadium: Arena CSKA; Attendance: 7,200; Referee: Vladimir Seldyakov

18 November 2016 14	Arsenal Tula	0 – 1	CSKA Moscow	Tula
19:00 MSK (UTC+3)	Khagush (yellow card) 80'; Gorbatenko (yellow card) 82'	Summary	Milanov 20'; Shchennikov (yellow card) 90+3'	Stadium: Arsenal Stadium; Attendance: 16,100; Referee: Vladislav Bezborodov

26 November 2016 15	CSKA Moscow	0 – 0	Rubin Kazan	Moscow
14:00 MSK (UTC+3)	Shchennikov (yellow card) 46'; Wernbloom (yellow card) 73'	Summary	Sánchez (yellow card) 30'; Rochina (yellow card) 46'; Ryzhikov (yellow card) 90+2'	Stadium: Arena CSKA; Attendance: 8,900; Referee: Alexander Yegorov

30 November 2016 16	CSKA Moscow	2 – 0	Orenburg	Moscow
19:30 MSK (UTC+3)	Natcho 26' (pen.); Tošić (yellow card) 53'; Ignashevich (yellow card) 68' (goal) 79'	Summary	Pomerko (yellow card) 20'; Andreyev (yellow card) 59' (yellow-red card) 74'	Stadium: Arena CSKA; Attendance: 5,000; Referee: Sergey Ivanov

3 December 2016 17	CSKA Moscow	4 – 0	Ural	Moscow
14:00 MSK (UTC+3)	Traoré 25', 35'; Natcho 38' (pen.); Chalov 40'	Summary	Novikov (yellow card) 37'; Fontanello (yellow card) 67'	Stadium: Arena CSKA; Attendance: 7,000; Referee: Aleksey Sukhoy

4 March 2017 18	CSKA Moscow	0 – 0	Zenit St.Petersburg	Moscow
16:30 MSK (UTC+3)	Golovin (yellow card) 29'; A.Berezutski (yellow card) 36'; Wernbloom (yellow card) 65' (yellow-red card) 70'	Summary	García (yellow card) 65'; Zhirkov (yellow card) 90+3'	Stadium: Arena CSKA; Attendance: 26,800; Referee: Alexander Yegorov

11 March 2017 19	CSKA Moscow	4 – 0	Tom Tomsk	Moscow
14:00 MSK (UTC+3)	Vitinho 1'; Dzagoev (yellow card) 19'; Ionov 44', 61'	Summary	Ciupercă (yellow card) 22'	Stadium: VEB Arena; Attendance: 11,000; Referee: Kirill Levnikov

19 March 2017 20	Terek Grozny	0 – 1	CSKA Moscow	Grozny
16:30 MSK (UTC+3)	Kuzyayev (yellow card) 88'	Summary	Ionov 28'; Berezutski (yellow card) 90+4'	Stadium: Akhmat-Arena; Attendance: 18,656; Referee: Sergey Ivanov

2 April 2017 21	CSKA Moscow	2 – 1	Krylia Sovetov	Moscow
19:00 MSK (UTC+3)	Golovin 16'; Fernandes (yellow card) 19'; Natcho 48'	Summary	Pasquato 72'	Stadium: VEB Arena; Attendance: 14,000; Referee: Aleksey Sukhoy

9 April 2017 22	Krasnodar	1 – 1	CSKA Moscow	Krasnodar
16:30 MSK (UTC+3)	Smolov 58' (pen.); Mamayev (yellow card) 62'	Summary	Wernbloom 72'; Fernandes (yellow card) 82'	Stadium: Kuban Stadium; Attendance: 31,165; Referee: Sergey Ivanov

15 April 2017 23	CSKA Moscow	0 – 0	Rostov	Moscow
14:30 MSK (UTC+3)	Fernandes (yellow card) 62'	Summary	Kalachev (yellow card) 79'; Gațcan (yellow card) 84'	Stadium: VEB Arena; Attendance: 15,000; Referee: Kirill Levnikov

21 April 2017 24	Ufa	0 – 2	CSKA Moscow	Ufa
17:00 MSK (UTC+3)		Summary	Akinfeev (yellow card) 2'; Shchennikov (yellow card) 52'; Vitinho 65'; Chalov 90'; V.Berezutski (yellow card) 90'	Stadium: Neftyanik Stadium; Attendance: 8,150; Referee: Vladislav Bezborodov

26 April 2017 25	CSKA Moscow	4 – 0	Lokomotiv Moscow	Moscow
19:30 MSK (UTC+3)	Dzagoev 11'; Vitinho 39'; Golovin 45'; Natcho 52'	Summary		Stadium: VEB Arena; Attendance: 16,940; Referee: Sergei Karasev

30 April 2017 26	CSKA Moscow	1 – 2	Spartak Moscow	Moscow
17:00 MSK (UTC+3)	A.Berezutski 45'; Vasin (yellow card) 55'; Tošić (yellow card) 89'	Summary	Adriano 32'; Dzhikiya (yellow card) 45+1'; Glushakov 51'; Yeshchenko (yellow card) 90+1'	Stadium: VEB Arena; Attendance: 27,352; Referee: Vladislav Bezborodov

6 May 2017 27	Amkar Perm	0 – 2	CSKA Moscow	Perm
14:00 MSK (UTC+3)	Zaytsev (yellow card) 36'; Condé (yellow card) 65'; Salugin (yellow card) 90'	Summary	Chalov 60'; Natcho 65'	Stadium: Zvezda Stadium; Attendance: 7,100; Referee: Kirill Levnikov

12 May 2017 28	CSKA Moscow	3 – 0	Arsenal Tula	Moscow
19:30 MSK (UTC+3)	Natcho 31' (pen.); Chalov 41', 53'; Kuchayev (yellow card) 90+2'	Report	Sunzu (yellow card) 29'; Kombarov (yellow card) 88'	Stadium: VEB Arena; Attendance: 10,791; Referee: Vladimir Seldyakov

17 May 2017 29	Rubin Kazan	0 – 2	CSKA Moscow	Kazan
19:30 MSK (UTC+3)	Caktaš (red card) 49'	Report	Vitinho 72'; Dzagoev 90+3'	Stadium: Kazan Arena; Attendance: 21,405; Referee: Mikhail Vilkov

21 May 2017 30	CSKA Moscow	4 – 0	Anzhi Makhachkala	Moscow
15:00 MSK (UTC+3)	Ignashevich 17'; Vitinho 24', 38'; Wernbloom (yellow card) 33'; Chalov 49'	Report	Guliyev (yellow card) 31'	Stadium: VEB Arena; Attendance: 16,523; Referee: Kirill Levnikov

==== League table ====
Pos	Team	Pld	W	D	L	GF	GA	GD	Pts	Qualification or relegation
1	Spartak Moscow (C)	30	22	3	5	46	27	+19	69	Qualification for the Champions League group stage
2	CSKA Moscow	30	18	8	4	47	15	+32	62	Qualification for the Champions League third qualifying round
3	Zenit Saint Petersburg	30	18	7	5	50	19	+31	61	Qualification for the Europa League third qualifying round
4	Krasnodar	30	12	13	5	40	22	+18	49	Qualification for the Europa League third qualifying round
5	Terek Grozny	30	14	6	10	38	35	+3	48	

Source: Russian Premier League, Soccerway
Rules for classification: 1) Points; 2) Matches won; 3) Head-to-head points; 4) Head-to-head matches won; 5) Head-to-head goal difference; 6) Head-to-head goals scored; 7) Head-to-head away goals; 8) Goal difference; 9) Goals scored; 10) Away goals scored.
(C) Champions

=== Russian Cup ===
21 September 2016 Round of 32	Yenisey Krasnoyarsk	2 – 1	CSKA Moscow	Krasnoyarsk
15:00 MSK (UTC+3)	Chernov 43'; Lomakin 83'	Summary	Nababkin (yellow card) 34'; Milanov 58'	Stadium: Central Stadium; Attendance: 5,000; Referee: Nikolay Voloshin

=== UEFA Champions League ===
==== Group stage ====
Pos	Team	Pld	W	D	L	GF	GA	GD	Pts	Qualification
1	(France) Monaco	6	3	2	1	9	7	+2	11	Advance to knockout phase
2	(Germany) Bayer Leverkusen	6	2	4	0	8	4	+4	10	Advance to knockout phase
3	(England) Tottenham Hotspur	6	2	1	3	6	6	0	7	Transfer to Europa League
4	(Russia) CSKA Moscow	6	0	3	3	5	11	−6	3	

Source: UEFA
Rules for classification: Group stage tiebreakers

14 September 2016 1	Bayer Leverkusen (Germany)	2 – 2	(Russia) CSKA Moscow	Leverkusen, Germany
21:45 MSK (UTC+3)	Mehmedi 9'; Çalhanoğlu 15'; Henrichs (yellow card) 83'; Wendell (yellow card) 86'	Report	Dzagoev 36'; Eremenko 38'	Stadium: BayArena; Attendance: 23,459; Referee: Daniele Orsato (Italy)

27 September 2016 2	CSKA Moscow (Russia)	0 – 1	(England) Tottenham Hotspur	Moscow, Russia
21:45 MSK (UTC+3)	Eremenko (yellow card) 37'	Report	Wanyama (yellow card) 11'; Son 71'	Stadium: Arena CSKA; Attendance: 26,153; Referee: Antonio Mateu Lahoz (Spain)

18 October 2016 3	CSKA Moscow (Russia)	1 – 1	(France) AS Monaco	Moscow, Russia
21:45 MSK (UTC+3)	Traoré 34'; Natcho (yellow card) 74'	Report	Bakayoko (yellow card) 37'; Silva 87'; Sidibé (yellow card) 90'	Stadium: Arena CSKA; Attendance: 24,125; Referee: Martin Strömbergsson (Sweden)

2 November 2016 4	AS Monaco (France)	3 – 0	(Russia) CSKA Moscow	Fontvieille, Monaco
22:45 MSK (UTC+3)	Germain 13'; Jemerson (yellow card) 24'; Falcao 29', 41'	Report	Golovin (yellow card) 90+2'	Stadium: Stade Louis II; Attendance: 10,029; Referee: Matej Jug (Slovenia)

22 November 2016 5	CSKA Moscow (Russia)	1 – 1	(Germany) Bayer Leverkusen	Moscow, Russia
20:00 MSK (UTC+3)	Akinfeev (yellow card) 37'; Wernbloom (yellow card) 62'; Natcho 76' (pen.)	Report	Volland 16'; Hernández (yellow card) 72'; Henrichs (yellow card) 75'; Kampl (yellow card) 77'	Stadium: Arena CSKA; Attendance: 19,164; Referee: Alberto Undiano Mallenco (Spain)

7 December 2016 6	Tottenham Hotspur (England)	3 – 1	(Russia) CSKA Moscow	London, England
22:45 MSK (UTC+3)	Alli 38'; Kane 45+1'; Akinfeev 77' (o.g.)	Report	Shchennikov (yellow card) 31'; Dzagoev 33'; Berezutski (yellow card) 63'	Stadium: Wembley Stadium; Attendance: 62,034; Referee: Nicola Rizzoli (Italy)

== Squad statistics ==
As of match played 21 May 2017

=== Appearances and goals ===
No.	Pos	Nat	Player	Total		Premier League		Russian Cup		Champions League		Super Cup	
No.	Pos	Nat	Player	Apps	Goals	Apps	Goals	Apps	Goals	Apps	Goals	Apps	Goals
1	GK	(Russia) RUS	Sergei Chepchugov	2	0	1	0	1	0	0	0	0	0
2	DF	(Brazil) BRA	Mário Fernandes	36	0	30	0	0	0	5	0	1	0
3	MF	(Sweden) SWE	Pontus Wernbloom	33	1	27	1	0	0	5	0	1	0
4	DF	(Russia) RUS	Sergei Ignashevich	29	4	21+3	4	0	0	4	0	1	0
5	DF	(Russia) RUS	Viktor Vasin	13	0	12+1	0	0	0	0	0	0	0
6	DF	(Russia) RUS	Aleksei Berezutski	25	1	13+5	1	1	0	3+2	0	1	0
7	MF	(Serbia) SRB	Zoran Tošić	29	1	16+8	1	0	0	4	0	1	0
8	MF	(Bulgaria) BUL	Georgi Milanov	26	3	9+9	2	1	1	3+3	0	0+1	0
10	MF	(Russia) RUS	Alan Dzagoev	18	5	11+4	3	0	0	3	2	0	0
11	MF	(Russia) RUS	Aleksei Ionov	29	3	17+7	3	1	0	3	0	1	0
14	DF	(Russia) RUS	Kirill Nababkin	10	0	3+4	0	1	0	1+1	0	0	0
17	MF	(Russia) RUS	Aleksandr Golovin	37	3	29+1	3	0	0	6	0	0+1	0
20	MF	(Brazil) BRA	Vitinho	13	6	12+1	6	0	0	0	0	0	0
24	DF	(Russia) RUS	Vasili Berezutski	32	1	27	1	0	0	5	0	0	0
35	GK	(Russia) RUS	Igor Akinfeev	36	0	29	0	0	0	6	0	1	0
42	DF	(Russia) RUS	Georgi Shchennikov	32	0	23+2	0	0	0	6	0	1	0
55	DF	(Russia) RUS	Mutalip Alibekov	1	0	0	0	1	0	0	0	0	0
63	FW	(Russia) RUS	Fyodor Chalov	18	6	8+7	6	1	0	1+1	0	0	0
66	MF	(Israel) ISR	Bibras Natcho	33	7	18+8	6	1	0	4+1	1	1	0
72	MF	(Russia) RUS	Astemir Gordyushenko	6	0	1+2	0	1	0	0+2	0	0	0
75	FW	(Russia) RUS	Timur Zhamaletdinov	4	0	0+3	0	1	0	0	0	0	0
80	MF	(Russia) RUS	Khetag Khosonov	1	0	0	0	1	0	0	0	0	0
89	MF	(Russia) RUS	Konstantin Kuchayev	2	0	0+2	0	0	0	0	0	0	0
99	FW	(Nigeria) NGR	Aaron Olanare	7	0	2+5	0	0	0	0	0	0	0
Banned by UEFA:
25	MF	(Finland) FIN	Roman Eremenko	12	4	9	3	0	0	2	1	1	0
Players away from the club on loan:
Players who left CSKA Moscow during the season:
9	FW	(Ivory Coast) CIV	Lacina Traoré	21	6	11+3	5	0	0	4+2	1	1	0
23	FW	(Sweden) SWE	Carlos Strandberg	15	2	1+7	2	1	0	1+4	0	0+1	0

=== Goal Scorers ===
Place	Position	Nation	Number	Name	Premier League	Russian Cup	Champions League	Super Cup	Total
1	MF	(Israel)	66	Bibras Natcho	6	0	1	0	7
2	FW	(Russia)	63	Fyodor Chalov	6	0	0	0	6
2	MF	(Brazil)	20	Vitinho	6	0	0	0	6
2	FW	(Ivory Coast)	9	Lacina Traoré	5	0	1	0	6
5	MF	(Russia)	10	Alan Dzagoev	3	0	2	0	5
6	DF	(Russia)	4	Sergei Ignashevich	4	0	0	0	4
6	MF	(Finland)	25	Roman Eremenko	3	0	1	0	4
8	MF	(Russia)	11	Aleksei Ionov	3	0	0	0	3
8	MF	(Russia)	17	Aleksandr Golovin	3	0	0	0	3
8	MF	(Bulgaria)	8	Georgi Milanov	2	1	0	0	3
11	FW	(Sweden)	23	Carlos Strandberg	2	0	0	0	2
12	DF	(Russia)	24	Vasili Berezutski	1	0	0	0	1
12	MF	(Serbia)	7	Zoran Tošić	1	0	0	0	1
12	MF	(Sweden)	3	Pontus Wernbloom	1	0	0	0	1
12	DF	(Russia)	6	Aleksei Berezutski	1	0	0	0	1
				TOTALS	47	1	5	0	53

=== Disciplinary record ===
Number	Nation	Position	Name	Premier League		Russian Cup		Champions League		Super Cup		Total	
Number	Nation	Position	Name	Yellow card	Red card	Yellow card	Red card	Yellow card	Red card	Yellow card	Red card	Yellow card	Red card
2	(Brazil)	DF	Mário Fernandes	3	0	0	0	0	0	0	0	3	0
3	(Sweden)	MF	Pontus Wernbloom	10	1	0	0	1	0	1	0	12	1
4	(Russia)	DF	Sergei Ignashevich	4	0	0	0	0	0	0	0	4	0
5	(Russia)	DF	Viktor Vasin	1	0	0	0	0	0	0	0	1	0
6	(Russia)	DF	Aleksei Berezutski	1	0	0	0	0	0	0	0	1	0
7	(Serbia)	MF	Zoran Tošić	4	0	0	0	0	0	1	0	5	0
8	(Bulgaria)	MF	Georgi Milanov	1	0	0	0	0	0	0	0	1	0
9	(Ivory Coast)	FW	Lacina Traoré	1	0	0	0	0	0	0	0	1	0
10	(Russia)	MF	Alan Dzagoev	1	0	0	0	0	0	0	0	1	0
14	(Russia)	DF	Kirill Nababkin	0	0	1	0	0	0	0	0	1	0
17	(Russia)	MF	Aleksandr Golovin	3	0	0	0	1	0	0	0	4	0
23	(Sweden)	FW	Carlos Strandberg	0	0	0	0	1	0	0	0	1	0
24	(Russia)	DF	Vasili Berezutski	2	0	0	0	1	0	0	0	3	0
25	(Finland)	MF	Roman Eremenko	0	0	0	0	1	0	0	0	1	0
35	(Russia)	GK	Igor Akinfeev	1	0	0	0	1	0	0	0	2	0
42	(Russia)	DF	Georgi Shchennikov	4	0	0	0	1	0	0	0	5	0
66	(Israel)	MF	Bibras Natcho	0	0	0	0	1	0	0	0	2	0
89	(Russia)	MF	Konstantin Kuchayev	1	0	0	0	0	0	0	0	1	0
			TOTALS	38	1	1	0	7	0	3	0	49	1

== Notes ==
1. Tottenham Hotspur will play their home matches at Wembley Stadium, London instead of their regular stadium, White Hart Lane, London.
