= 2018 Russian Super Cup =

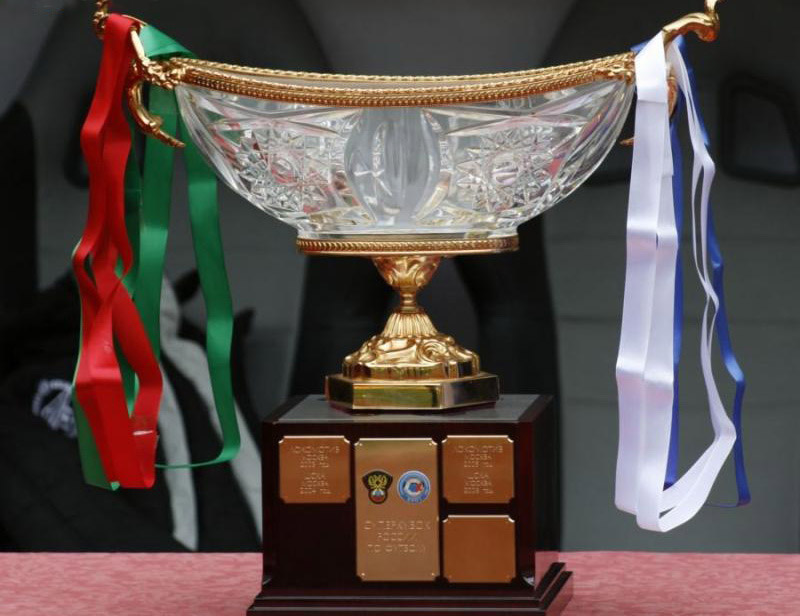
- Event: Russian Super Cup
Lokomotiv Moscow	CSKA Moscow
0	1
- After extra time
- Date: 27 July 2018
- Venue: Nizhny Novgorod Stadium, Nizhny Novgorod
- Referee: Vladislav Bezborodov
- Attendance: 43,319

The 2018 Russian Super Cup (Russian: Суперкубок России) was the 16th annual Russian Super Cup match which was contested between the 2017–18 Russian Premier League champion, Lokomotiv Moscow, and the 2017–18 Russian Premier League runner-up, CSKA Moscow. 2017–18 Russian Cup winner FC Tosno was dissolved in the summer 2018 and was replaced by CSKA in the game.

CSKA Moscow won in extra time.

== Match details ==
27 July 2018
21:30 MSK (UTC+3)

Lokomotiv Moscow	0–1 (a.e.t.)	CSKA Moscow
	Report	Khosonov 106'

Nizhny Novgorod Stadium, Nizhny Novgorod
Attendance: 43,319
Referee: Vladislav Bezborodov (St. Petersburg)

GK	1	(Russia) Guilherme
DF	33	(Georgia (country)) Solomon Kvirkvelia	(red card) 114'
DF	31	(Poland) Maciej Rybus
DF	14	(Croatia) Vedran Ćorluka	(substituted off) 91'
MF	27	(Russia) Igor Denisov (c)	(substituted off) 106'
MF	20	(Russia) Vladislav Ignatyev
MF	6	(Russia) Dmitri Barinov
MF	59	(Russia) Aleksei Miranchuk
MF	11	(Russia) Anton Miranchuk
MF	4	(Portugal) Manuel Fernandes	(substituted off) 69'
FW	24	(Portugal) Eder	(substituted off) 91'
Substitutes:
GK	77	(Russia) Anton Kochenkov
DF	29	(Uzbekistan) Vitaliy Denisov
DF	28	(Finland) Boris Rotenberg
DF	3	(Nigeria) Brian Idowu	(substituted in) 91'
DF	17	(Ukraine) Taras Mykhalyk
DF	84	(Russia) Mikhail Lysov
MF	23	(Russia) Dmitri Tarasov	(substituted in) 106'
MF	96	(Russia) Rifat Zhemaletdinov	(substituted in) 69'
MF	83	(Russia) Aleksei Mironov
MF	69	(Russia) Daniil Kulikov
MF	67	(Russia) Roman Tugarev
FW	8	(Peru) Jefferson Farfán	(substituted in) 91'
Manager:
(Russia) Yuri Semin

GK	35	(Russia) Igor Akinfeev (c)
DF	3	(Russia) Nikita Chernov	(yellow card) 66'
DF	2	(Russia) Mário Fernandes
DF	23	(Iceland) Hörður Björgvin Magnússon
DF	50	(Brazil) Rodrigo Becão
MF	14	(Russia) Kirill Nababkin	(substituted off) 67'
MF	10	(Russia) Alan Dzagoev	(substituted off) 13'
MF	15	(Russia) Dmitry Yefremov	(substituted off) 81'
MF	25	(Croatia) Kristijan Bistrović	(yellow card) 57'
FW	9	(Russia) Fyodor Chalov
FW	11	(Brazil) Vitinho	(substituted off) 117'
Substitutes:
GK	1	(Russia) Ilya Pomazun
DF	13	(Russia) Georgi Shchennikov	(substituted in) 13'
MF	72	(Russia) Astemir Gordyushenko
MF	77	(Russia) Ilzat Akhmetov
MF	70	(Russia) Timur Pukhov
MF	80	(Russia) Khetag Khosonov	(substituted in) 67'
MF	71	(Russia) Nayair Tiknizyan
MF	29	(Slovenia) Jaka Bijol	(substituted in) 81'
FW	75	(Russia) Timur Zhamaletdinov	(substituted in) 117'
FW	81	(Russia) Vitali Zhironkin
Manager:
(Belarus) Viktor Goncharenko

Assistant referees: Valeri Danchenko (Ufa), Maksim Gavrilin (Vladimir)

Fourth official: Kirill Levnikov (St. Petersburg)
