= Timur Zhamaletdinov =

Russian footballer

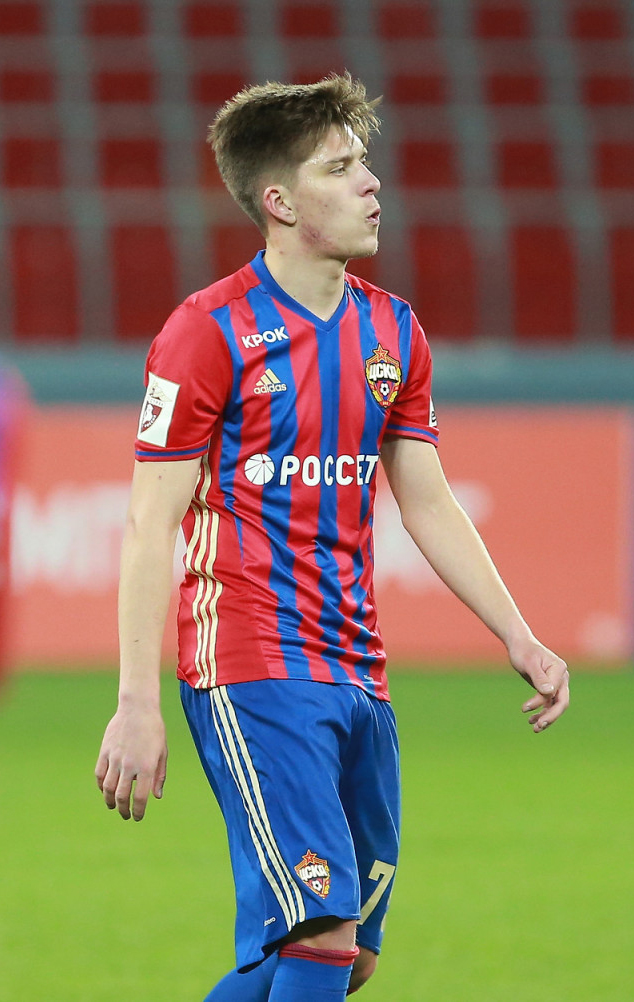
- Zhamaletdinov with CSKA in 2017

Personal information
- Full name: Timur Abdurashitovich Zhamaletdinov
- Date of birth: 21 May 1997 (age 29)
- Place of birth: Moscow, Russia
- Height: 1.81 m (5 ft 11 in)
- Position: Forward

Team information
- Current team: Arsenal Tula
- Number: 75

Youth career
- 2003–2014: Lokomotiv Moscow
- 2014–2017: CSKA Moscow

Senior career*
Years	Team	Apps	(Gls)
2017–2020	CSKA Moscow	30	(4)
2019–2020	→ Lech Poznań (loan)	18	(1)
2019–2020	→ Lech Poznań II (loan)	8	(3)
2020–2022	Ufa	40	(4)
2022–2023	SKA-Khabarovsk	19	(4)
2023–2024	Volgar Astrakhan	27	(5)
2024–2025	Shinnik Yaroslavl	18	(1)
2025	Znamya Truda	14	(12)
2025–2026	Chelyabinsk	16	(2)
2026–	Arsenal Tula	0	(0)

International career
2016	Russia U19	2	(1)
2017	Russia U21	2	(0)
- * Club domestic league appearances and goals as of 16 May 2026

Timur Abdurashitovich Zhamaletdinov (Russian: Тимур Абдурашитович Жамалетдинов; born 21 May 1997) is a Russian professional footballer who plays as a striker for Arsenal Tula.

== Club career ==
He made his debut for the main squad of CSKA Moscow in the Russian Cup game against Yenisey Krasnoyarsk on 21 September 2016.

He made his Russian Premier League debut for CSKA on 9 April 2017 in a game against Krasnodar.

On 12 September 2017, he scored a winning goal in CSKA's 2–1 away victory over Benfica in the 2017–18 UEFA Champions League group stage.

On 15 September 2018, he scored twice in a 3–0 league victory over Ufa after replacing Hörður Björgvin Magnússon in the middle of the first half due to Hörður's injury.

On 25 January 2019, he joined Polish club Lech Poznań on loan until the end of the 2018–19 season, with Lech also holding an option to purchase his rights at the end of the season. On 14 June 2019, he extended his contract with CSKA Moscow until the end of the 2020–21 season and was loaned to Lech again for the 2019–20 season.

On 12 August 2020, he moved to Ufa.

== Career statistics ==
As of 16 May 2026

Appearances and goals by club, season and competition
Club	Season	League			National cup (Note: Includes Russian Cup, Polish Cup)		Continental		Other		Total	
Club	Season	Division	Apps	Goals	Apps	Goals	Apps	Goals	Apps	Goals	Apps	Goals
CSKA Moscow	2016–17	Russian Premier League	4	0	1	0	0	0	—		5	0
CSKA Moscow	2017–18	Russian Premier League	14	1	0	0	6 (Note: Appearances in UEFA Champions League)	1	—		20	2
CSKA Moscow	2018–19	Russian Premier League	12	3	1	0	2	0	1 (Note: Appearance in Russian Super Cup)	0	16	3
CSKA Moscow	Total		30	4	2	0	8	1	1	0	41	5
Lech Poznań (loan)	2018–19	Ekstraklasa	7	1	—		—		—		7	1
Lech Poznań (loan)	2019–20	Ekstraklasa	11	0	1	1	—		—		12	1
Lech Poznań (loan)	Total		18	1	1	1	0	0	0	0	19	2
Lech Poznań II (loan)	2018–19	III liga, gr. II	2	1	—		—		—		2	1
Lech Poznań II (loan)	2019–20	II liga	6	2	—		—		—		6	2
Lech Poznań II (loan)	Total		8	3	0	0	0	0	0	0	8	3
Ufa	2020–21	Russian Premier League	28	4	4	3	—		—		32	7
Ufa	2021–22	Russian Premier League	5	0	0	0	—		1 (Note: Appearance in relegation play-offs)	0	6	0
Ufa	2022–23	Russian First League	7	0	—		—		—		7	0
Ufa	Total		40	4	4	3	0	0	1	0	45	7
SKA-Khabarovsk	2022–23	Russian First League	19	4	1	0	—		—		20	4
Volgar Astrakhan	2023–24	Russian First League	27	5	4	2	—		—		31	7
Shinnik Yaroslavl	2024–25	Russian First League	18	1	4	1	—		—		22	2
Znamya Truda	2025	Russian Second League B	14	12	—		—		—		14	12
Chelyabinsk	2025–26	Russian First League	16	2	2	0	—		—		18	2
Career total			190	36	18	7	8	1	2	0	218	44

== Honours ==
CSKA Moscow

- Russian Super Cup: 2018

Lech Poznań II

- III liga, group II: 2018–19
