= Ivan Oleynikov =

Russian footballer (born 1998)

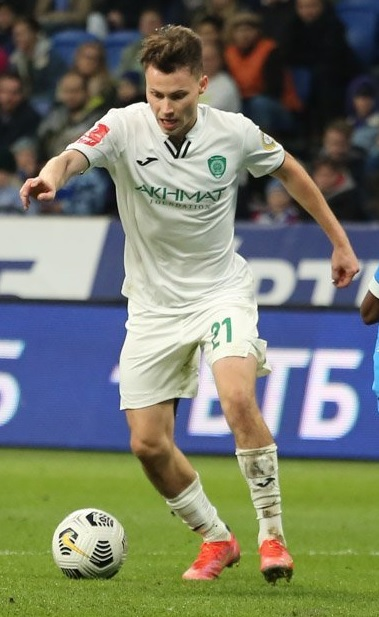
- Oleynikov with Akhmat Grozny in 2022

Personal information
- Full name: Ivan Antonovich Oleynikov
- Date of birth: 24 August 1998 (age 28)
- Place of birth: Podolsk, Russia
- Height: 1.75 m (5 ft 9 in)
- Position: Midfielder

Team information
- Current team: CSKA Moscow
- Number: 19

Youth career
- 2003–2005: Vityaz Podolsk
- 2005–2016: CSKA Moscow

Senior career*
Years	Team	Apps	(Gls)
2017–2019	CSKA Moscow	0	(0)
2019	→ Fakel Voronezh (loan)	14	(1)
2019–2021	Shinnik Yaroslavl	40	(5)
2021–2022	Chayka Peschanokopskoye	44	(24)
2022–2024	Akhmat Grozny	52	(3)
2024–2026	Krylia Sovetov Samara	57	(14)
2026–	CSKA Moscow	8	(0)

International career^{‡}
2020	Russia U20	3	(2)
- * Club domestic league appearances and goals as of 21 November 2026 ‡ National team caps and goals as of 20 February 2020

Ivan Antonovich Oleynikov (Russian: Иван Антонович Олейников; born 24 August 1998) is a Russian football player who plays for CSKA Moscow. He is deployed as an attacking midfielder or winger on either side of the field.

== Club career ==
He made his debut for the main squad of CSKA Moscow on 20 September 2017 in a Russian Cup game against Avangard Kursk. He made his second appearance on 10 October 2018 in a Russian Cup game against Tyumen.

On 22 February 2019, Oleynikov had joined Fakel Voronezh on loan until the end of the season. He made his Russian Football National League debut for Fakel on 3 March 2019 in a game against Khimki.

On 19 June 2019, Oleynikov left CSKA Moscow to join Shinnik Yaroslavl on a permanent transfer.

On 2 July 2022, Oleynikov signed with Russian Premier League club Akhmat Grozny for one year with an option to extend for three more years. He made his RPL debut for Akhmat on 16 July 2022 against Spartak Moscow.

On 25 February 2024, Oleynikov extended his contract with Akhmat to June 2027.

On 5 August 2024, Oleynikov moved to Krylia Sovetov Samara on a three-year contract.

On 9 September 2026, he returned to his first club CSKA Moscow and signed a contract until June 2029.

== Career statistics ==
=== Club ===
As of match played 21 November 2026

Appearances and goals by club, season and competition
Club	Season	League			National Cup		Continental		Other		Total	
Club	Season	Division	Apps	Goals	Apps	Goals	Apps	Goals	Apps	Goals	Apps	Goals
CSKA Moscow	2016–17	Russian Premier League	0	0	0	0	0	0	0	0	0	0
CSKA Moscow	2017–18	Russian Premier League	0	0	1	0	0	0	—		1	0
CSKA Moscow	2018–19	Russian Premier League	0	0	1	0	0	0	—		1	0
CSKA Moscow	Total		0	0	2	0	0	0	0	0	2	0
Fakel Voronezh	2018–19	Russian First League	14	1	—		—		4 (Note: Appearances in the FNL Cup)	0	18	1
Shinnik Yaroslavl	2019–20	Russian First League	26	5	3	0	—		—		29	5
Shinnik Yaroslavl	2020–21	Russian First League	14	0	1	0	—		—		15	0
Shinnik Yaroslavl	Total		40	5	4	0	0	0	0	0	44	5
Chayka Peschanokopskoye	2020–21	Russian First League	14	1	—		—		—		14	1
Chayka Peschanokopskoye	2021–22	Russian Second League	30	23	5	3	—		—		35	26
Chayka Peschanokopskoye	Total		44	24	5	3	0	0	0	0	49	27
Akhmat Grozny	2022–23	Russian Premier League	24	2	7	3	—		—		31	5
Akhmat Grozny	2023–24	Russian Premier League	27	1	8	3	—		—		35	4
Akhmat Grozny	2024–25	Russian Premier League	1	0	0	0	—		—		1	0
Akhmat Grozny	Total		52	3	15	6	0	0	0	0	67	9
Krylia Sovetov Samara	2024–25	Russian Premier League	25	6	4	0	—		—		29	6
Krylia Sovetov Samara	2025–26	Russian Premier League	25	5	8	2	—		—		33	7
Krylia Sovetov Samara	2026–27	Russian Premier League	7	3	2	0	—		—		9	3
Krylia Sovetov Samara	Total		57	14	14	2	0	0	0	0	71	16
CSKA Moscow	2026–27	Russian Premier League	8	0	0	0	—		—		8	0
CSKA Moscow	Club total		8	0	2	0	0	0	0	0	10	0
Career total			215	47	40	11	0	0	4	0	259	58
