= Jaka Bijol =

Slovenian footballer (born 1999)

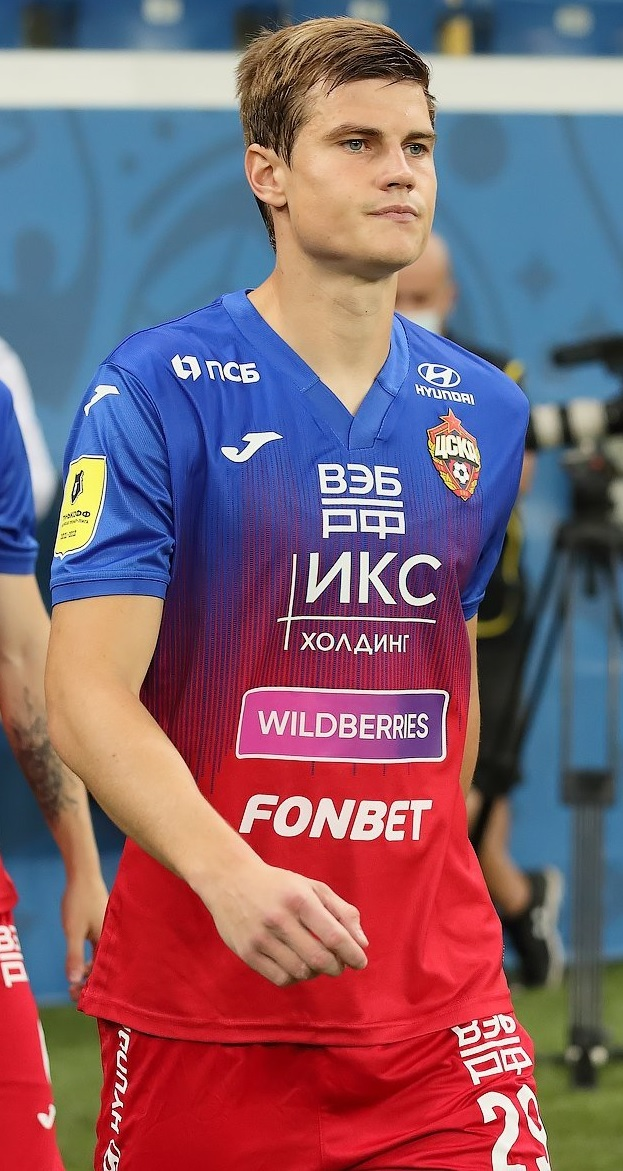
- Bijol with CSKA Moscow in 2021

Personal information
- Date of birth: 5 February 1999 (age 27)
- Place of birth: Vuzenica, Slovenia
- Height: 1.90 m (6 ft 3 in)
- Positions: Centre-back; defensive midfielder

Team information
- Current team: Leeds United
- Number: 15

Youth career
- –2014: Dravograd
- 2014–2017: Bravo

Senior career*
Years	Team	Apps	(Gls)
2017–2018	Rudar Velenje	30	(3)
2018–2022	CSKA Moscow	81	(6)
2020–2021	→ Hannover 96 (loan)	30	(0)
2022–2025	Udinese	90	(4)
2025–	Leeds United	30	(1)

International career^{‡}
2014	Slovenia U16	4	(0)
2015–2016	Slovenia U17	10	(1)
2016–2017	Slovenia U18	9	(2)
2017	Slovenia U19	2	(0)
2017–2018	Slovenia U21	4	(0)
2018–	Slovenia	78	(1)
- * Club domestic league appearances and goals as of 25 October 2026 ‡ National team caps and goals as of 13 November 2026

Jaka Bijol (born 5 February 1999) is a Slovenian professional footballer who plays as a centre-back for Premier League club Leeds United and the Slovenia national team. Initially a defensive midfielder, he switched to his current position in the 2021–22 season.

== Club career ==
On 22 June 2018, CSKA Moscow announced the signing of Bijol on a five-year contract from Rudar Velenje. On 18 September 2020, Bijol was loaned out to Hannover 96 for one year.

On 14 July 2022, Bijol was signed by Serie A club Udinese on a five-year contract for a reported transfer fee of over €4 million. In November 2023, he suffered a foot injury and was sidelined for over two months.

After three years with Udinese, for whom he made 90 league appearances and scored 4 goals, Bijol transferred to Premier League outfit Leeds United in June 2025, signing a five-year contract with The Whites. The transfer fee was reported at approximately €21 million, making him the second most expensive Slovenian footballer of all time, behind only Benjamin Šeško.

== International career ==
On 13 October 2018, Bijol debuted with the Slovenia senior team in the 2018–19 UEFA Nations League match against Norway, which Slovenia lost 1–0. He scored his first goal in a friendly match against Croatia on 26 March 2022, scoring a stoppage-time goal to secure a 1–1 draw.

Bijol represented Slovenia at UEFA Euro 2024, where he was selected by football statistics portal WhoScored in the best eleven of the tournament.

== Career statistics ==
=== Club ===
As of match played 24 May 2026

Appearances and goals by club, season and competition
Club	Season	League			National cup (Note: Includes Russian Cup, DFB-Pokal, Coppa Italia, FA Cup)		League cup (Note: Includes EFL Cup)		Europe		Other		Total	
Club	Season	Division	Apps	Goals	Apps	Goals	Apps	Goals	Apps	Goals	Apps	Goals	Apps	Goals
Rudar Velenje	2017–18	Slovenian PrvaLiga	30	3	0	0	—		—		—		30	3
CSKA Moscow	2018–19	Russian Premier League	23	4	0	0	—		3 (Note: Appearances in UEFA Champions League)	0	1 (Note: Appearance in Russian Super Cup)	0	27	4
CSKA Moscow	2019–20	Russian Premier League	25	1	3	1	—		6 (Note: Appearances in UEFA Europa League)	0	—		34	2
CSKA Moscow	2020–21	Russian Premier League	5	0	0	0	—		0	0	—		5	0
CSKA Moscow	2021–22	Russian Premier League	28	1	2	0	—		—		—		30	1
CSKA Moscow	Total		81	6	5	1	—		9	0	1	0	96	7
Hannover 96 (loan)	2020–21	2. Bundesliga	30	0	1	0	—		—		—		31	0
Udinese	2022–23	Serie A	32	3	1	0	—		—		—		33	3
Udinese	2023–24	Serie A	24	0	1	0	—		—		—		25	0
Udinese	2024–25	Serie A	34	1	3	1	—		—		—		37	2
Udinese	Total		90	4	5	1	—		—		—		95	5
Leeds United	2025–26	Premier League	25	1	5	0	1	0	—		—		31	1
Career total			256	14	16	2	1	0	9	0	1	0	283	16

=== International ===
As of match played 13 November 2026

Appearances and goals by national team and year
National team	Year	Apps	Goals
Slovenia	2018	3	0
Slovenia	2019	5	0
Slovenia	2020	6	0
Slovenia	2021	11	0
Slovenia	2022	10	1
Slovenia	2023	10	0
Slovenia	2024	14	0
Slovenia	2025	10	0
Slovenia	2026	9	0
Total		78	1

Scores and results list Slovenia's goal tally first, score column indicates score after each Bijol goal.

List of international goals scored by Jaka Bijol
No.	Date	Venue	Opponent	Score	Result	Competition
1	26 March 2022	Education City Stadium, Al Rayyan, Qatar	Croatia	1–1	1–1	Friendly

== Honours ==
CSKA Moscow

- Russian Super Cup: 2018
