= Ilzat Akhmetov =

Russian footballer

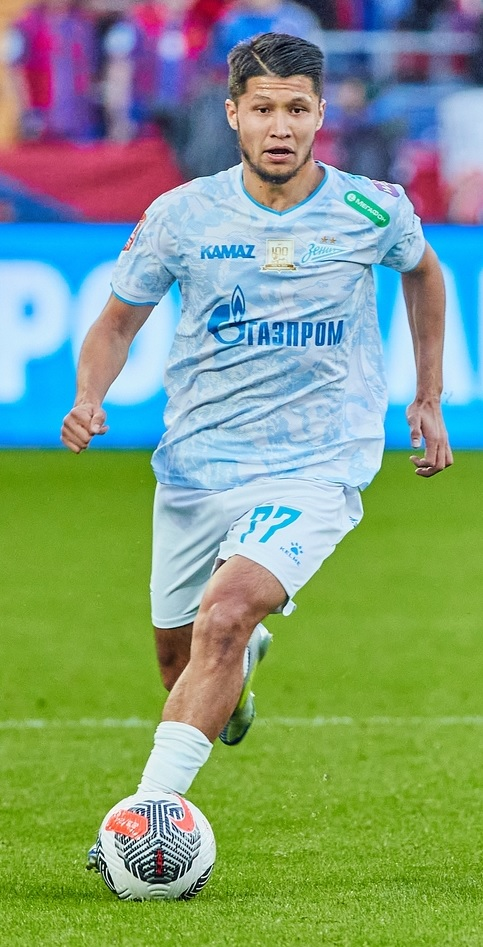
- Akhmetov with Zenit in 2025

Personal information
- Full name: Ilzat Toglokovich Akhmetov
- Date of birth: 31 December 1997 (age 28)
- Place of birth: Bishkek, Kyrgyzstan
- Height: 1.73 m (5 ft 8 in)
- Position: Midfielder

Team information
- Current team: Krylia Sovetov Samara
- Number: 97

Youth career
- Alga Bishkek
- 2009–2013: Yu. Konoplyov
- 2013–2014: Rubin Kazan

Senior career*
Years	Team	Apps	(Gls)
2014–2018	Rubin Kazan	27	(0)
2014	→ Rubin-2 Kazan	2	(0)
2018–2022	CSKA Moscow	81	(3)
2022–2023	Krasnodar	42	(4)
2024–2026	Zenit Saint Petersburg	7	(0)
2025–2026	→ Krylia Sovetov Samara (loan)	23	(1)
2026–	Krylia Sovetov Samara	5	(0)

International career^{‡}
2014–2015	Russia U18	10	(2)
2015	Russia U19	5	(0)
2017–2018	Russia U21	6	(2)
2019–	Russia	9	(0)
- * Club domestic league appearances and goals as of 20 November 2026 ‡ National team caps and goals as of 23 March 2023

Ilzat Toglokovich Akhmetov (Russian: Ильзат Тоглокович Ахметов; Uyghur: ئىلزات ئەخمەت, romanized: Ilzat Axmetow, Илзат Тоглокович Ахметов; born 31 December 1997) is a professional footballer who plays as a central midfielder for Russian Premier League club Krylia Sovetov Samara. Earlier in his career he mostly played in the attacking midfielder position. Born in Kyrgyzstan, he plays for the Russia national team.

== Early life ==
Born in Kyrgyzstan to Uyghur parents, Akhmetov moved to Russia at 11.

== Club career ==
He made his professional debut in the Russian Professional Football League for FC Rubin-2 Kazan on 18 July 2014 in a game against FC Syzran-2003 Syzran.

He made his debut for the main FC Rubin Kazan squad on 24 September 2014 in a Russian Cup game against FC Luch-Energiya Vladivostok. He made his Russian Premier League debut for Rubin Kazan on 20 October 2014 in a game against FC Mordovia Saransk.

On 15 June 2018, FC Zenit Saint Petersburg announced that Akhmetov would join them for a try-out during the first pre-season camp.

On 26 July 2018, CSKA Moscow announced the signing of Akhmetov on a four-year contract. Akhmetov left CSKA as a free agent in June 2022.

On 7 July 2022, Krasnodar announced the signing of Akhmetov on a contract until 30 June 2024.

On 9 January 2024, Akhmetov signed a contract with FC Zenit Saint Petersburg until the end of 2025–26 season, with an option for the 2026–27 season.

On 6 August 2025, Akhmetov was loaned by Krylia Sovetov Samara. On 1 May 2026, Akhmetov lost consciousness during a game against Spartak Moscow after colliding with a defender, he was hospitalized and suffered a concussion.

Akhmetov became a free agent as his Zenit contract expired in June 2026 and was not extended.

On 10 September 2026, he returned to Krylia Sovetov Samara on a one-season contract.

== International ==
He was able to represent for either Kyrgyzstan or Russia. Manager of Kyrgyzstan Aleksandr Krestinin, a Russian himself, tried to call him up, but he ultimately chose the latter.

He was called up to the Russian team for the first time in November 2018 for games against Germany and Sweden. He was forced to miss the callup due to injury.

He made his debut for the team on 21 March 2019 in a UEFA Euro 2020 qualifier against Belgium, as a starter.

== Career statistics ==
=== Club ===
As of match played 20 November 2026

Appearances and goals by club, season and competition
Club	Season	League			Cup		Europe		Total	
Club	Season	Division	Apps	Goals	Apps	Goals	Apps	Goals	Apps	Goals
Rubin-2 Kazan	2014–15	Russian Second League	2	0	—		—		2	0
Rubin Kazan	2014–15	Russian Premier League	9	0	1	0	—		10	0
Rubin Kazan	2015–16	Russian Premier League	3	0	1	0	2	0	6	0
Rubin Kazan	2016–17	Russian Premier League	12	0	3	0	—		15	0
Rubin Kazan	2017–18	Russian Premier League	3	0	0	0	—		3	0
Rubin Kazan	Total		27	0	5	0	2	0	34	0
CSKA Moscow	2018–19	Russian Premier League	26	0	0	0	4	0	30	0
CSKA Moscow	2019–20	Russian Premier League	21	2	3	2	6	0	30	4
CSKA Moscow	2020–21	Russian Premier League	14	0	3	1	5	0	22	1
CSKA Moscow	2021–22	Russian Premier League	20	1	2	1	—		22	2
CSKA Moscow	Total		81	3	8	4	15	0	104	7
Krasnodar	2022–23	Russian Premier League	27	2	13	2	—		40	4
Krasnodar	2023–24	Russian Premier League	15	2	6	1	—		21	3
Krasnodar	Total		42	4	19	3	—		61	7
Zenit Saint Petersburg	2023–24	Russian Premier League	2	0	4	0	—		6	0
Zenit Saint Petersburg	2024–25	Russian Premier League	5	0	10	0	—		15	0
Zenit Saint Petersburg	Total		7	0	14	0	—		21	0
Krylia Sovetov Samara (loan)	2025–26	Russian Premier League	23	1	8	1	—		31	2
Krylia Sovetov Samara	2026–27	Russian Premier League	5	0	2	0	—		7	0
Krylia Sovetov Samara	Club total		28	1	10	1	—		38	2
Career total			187	8	56	8	17	0	260	16

=== International ===
As of match played 23 March 2023

Appearances and goals by national team and year
National team	Year	Apps	Goals
Russia	2019	7	0
Russia	2021	1	0
Russia	2023	1	0
Total		9	0

== Honours ==
CSKA Moscow

- Russian Super Cup: 2018

Zenit Saint Petersburg

- Russian Premier League: 2023–24
- Russian Cup: 2023–24
