= Anatoli Anisimov =

Russian football player

Personal information
- Full name: Anatoli Andreyevich Anisimov
- Date of birth: 23 May 1998 (age 28)
- Place of birth: Vasilyevo, Russia
- Height: 1.86 m (6 ft 1 in)
- Position: Midfielder

Team information
- Current team: Atom Novovoronezh

Youth career
- Rubin Kazan
- –2019: CSKA Moscow

Senior career*
Years	Team	Apps	(Gls)
2018–2019	CSKA Moscow	0	(0)
2019–2021	Ural-2 Yekaterinburg	37	(2)
2021	Ural Yekaterinburg	0	(0)
2021	Veles Moscow	9	(0)
2022–2023	Tyumen	19	(4)
2023	Rubin-2 Kazan	1	(0)
2024	Atom Novovoronezh (amateur)		
2025	Uralets-TS Nizhny Tagil	23	(1)
2026–	Atom Novovoronezh (amateur)		

International career
2015	Russia U17	4	(0)
2015–2016	Russia U18	8	(1)
- * Club domestic league appearances and goals as of 19 October 2025

Anatoli Andreyevich Anisimov (Russian: Анатолий Андреевич Анисимов; born 23 May 1998) is a Russian football player who plays for Atom Novovoronezh.

== Career ==
=== Club ===
Anisimov made his debut for the main CSKA Moscow squad on 10 October 2018 in a Russian Cup game against Tyumen. On 31 May 2019, Anisimov left CSKA Moscow after the expiration of his contract.

=== International ===
Anisimov represented Russia U17 at the 2015 FIFA U-17 World Cup.

== Career statistics ==
=== Club ===
As of match played 10 October 2018

Appearances and goals by club, season and competition
Club	Season	League			National Cup		Continental		Other		Total	
Club	Season	Division	Apps	Goals	Apps	Goals	Apps	Goals	Apps	Goals	Apps	Goals
CSKA Moscow	2016–17	Russian Premier League	0	0	0	0	0	0	0	0	0	0
CSKA Moscow	2017–18	Russian Premier League	0	0	0	0	0	0	-		0	0
CSKA Moscow	2018–19	Russian Premier League	0	0	1	0	0	0	0	0	1	0
CSKA Moscow	Total		0	0	1	0	0	0	0	0	1	0
Career total			0	0	1	0	0	0	0	0	1	0
