= Hörður Björgvin Magnússon =

Icelandic footballer (born 1993)

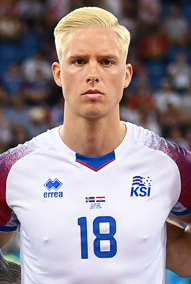
- Hörður with Iceland at the 2018 FIFA World Cup

Personal information
- Full name: Hörður Björgvin Magnússon
- Date of birth: 11 February 1993 (age 33)
- Place of birth: Reykjavík, Iceland
- Height: 1.90 m (6 ft 3 in)
- Position: Centre-back

Team information
- Current team: Atromitos
- Number: 32

Youth career
- 1998–2009: Fram

Senior career*
Years	Team	Apps	(Gls)
2009–2011	Fram	6	(0)
2011–2016	Juventus	0	(0)
2013–2014	→ Spezia (loan)	20	(0)
2014–2016	→ Cesena (loan)	39	(1)
2016–2018	Bristol City	52	(1)
2018–2022	CSKA Moscow	76	(5)
2022–2025	Panathinaikos	28	(2)
2025–2026	Levadiakos	18	(0)
2026–	Atromitos	3	(0)

International career^{‡}
2009	Iceland U17	7	(0)
2009–2011	Iceland U19	16	(2)
2012–2014	Iceland U21	14	(0)
2014–	Iceland	58	(2)
- * Club domestic league appearances and goals as of 19 September 2026 ‡ National team caps and goals as of 13 November 2026

Hörður Björgvin Magnússon (born 11 February 1993) is an Icelandic professional footballer who plays as a centre-back for Greek Super League club Atromitos and the Iceland national team.

== Club career ==
=== Early career ===
Born in Reykjavík, Iceland, Hörður began his career within the youth academy of Knattspyrnufélagið Fram in 1998. He remained within the youth academy until 2010, although he managed to appear in six first–team matches between the 2009 and 2010 campaigns, with his debut coming in a 3–1 away defeat to KR on 30 August 2009.

He remained with his local team until 2011, when he was transferred to Italian club Juventus.

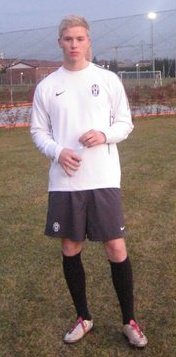
Hörður with Juventus in 2011

=== Juventus ===
On 23 July 2011, Hörður officially transferred to Juventus where he was registered with the club's youth academy. After spending the 2011–12 and 2012–13 seasons as an overage player with the Primavera (under-19) team, Hörður was promoted to the first-team squad ahead of the 2013–14 Serie A campaign.

=== Spezia ===
Initially part of Juventus’ first-team training camp, Hörður was soon transferred to Serie B side Spezia Calcio on a co-ownership agreement completed on 5 August 2014 for €1 million. He made his Serie B debut on 24 September 2013 in a 2–1 away win versus Ternana. He finished the season having made 20 league appearances for the side who finished in the final promotion play-off spot, although they failed to progress beyond the first post-season match following a 1–0 defeat away to Modena.

=== Cesena (loan) ===
In June 2014 Juventus bought back the 50% share of the player's contract that they had sold to Spezia one year earlier, for €1 million, and immediately loaned Hörður out to Serie A outfit A.C. Cesena on 23 July 2014. On 31 August 2015, the loan was renewed.

=== Bristol City ===
On 13 July 2016, it was announced that Hörður had signed for Championship side Bristol City for an undisclosed fee, penning a three-year deal. He made his debut for the club on 6 August 2016 and scored City's first goal in a 2–1 come-from-behind win over Wigan Athletic. The goal was initially credited to Tammy Abraham although it was later decided that Hörður had scored instead.

Magnusson featured in every game as Bristol City reached the semi-finals of the 2017–18 EFL Cup with wins over Premier League opponents Watford, Stoke City, Crystal Palace and Manchester United. Magnusson also played as City lost in the semi-final against Premier League leaders Manchester City.

=== CSKA Moscow ===
On 20 June 2018, Russian club CSKA Moscow announced that they had agreed on a transfer of Hörður with Bristol City, with personal terms still to be signed, while Bristol City announced that Hörður had left for an undisclosed fee. On 20 May 2022, CSKA announced that Hörður's contract will not be renewed after it expires at the end of the 2021–22 season.

=== Panathinaikos ===
On 9 July 2022, Hörður signed a two-year contract with Panathinaikos in Greece. After a successful first season, he suffered an anterior cruciate ligament injury on 25 September 2023, in the first minute of a match against AEK. On 20 May 2025, Panathinaikos announced that Hörður would leave the club following the expiry of his contract.

== International career ==
Hörður was selected as part of the Iceland national team's 23-man squad for Euro 2016. Iceland impressed during the competition, before being knocked out by hosts France at the quarter-final stage. Hörður did not take part in any of Iceland's five matches.

On 28 March 2017, Hörður scored his first goal for Iceland in a 1–0 friendly international win against the Republic of Ireland at the Aviva Stadium. After their qualification for the 2018 FIFA World Cup, Magnússon was named by The Guardian as Iceland's "one to watch" for the tournament. In May 2018 he was named in Iceland's 23-man squad for the 2018 World Cup in Russia.

== Career statistics ==
=== Club ===
As of 7 April 2026

Appearances and goals by club, season and competition
Club	Season	League			Cup		Continental		Other		Total	
Club	Season	Division	Apps	Goals	Apps	Goals	Apps	Goals	Apps	Goals	Apps	Goals
Knattspyrnufélagið Fram	2009	Úrvalsdeild karla	3	0	0	0	–		–		3	0
Knattspyrnufélagið Fram	2010	Úrvalsdeild karla	3	0	0	0	–		–		3	0
Knattspyrnufélagið Fram	Total		6	0	0	0	0	0	0	0	6	0
Spezia (loan)	2013–14	Serie B	20	0	1	0	–		–		21	0
Cesena (loan)	2014–15	Serie A	12	0	0	0	–		–		12	0
Cesena (loan)	2015–16	Serie B	26	1	1	0	–		1 (Note: Appearance in Serie B play-off)	0	28	1
Cesena (loan)	Total		38	1	1	0	0	0	1	0	40	1
Bristol City	2016–17	Championship	28	1	1	0	–		–		29	1
Bristol City	2017–18	Championship	24	0	1	0	–		7 (Note: Appearances in EFL Cup)	0	32	0
Bristol City	Total		52	1	2	0	0	0	7	0	61	1
CSKA Moscow	2018–19	Russian Premier League	23	2	0	0	3 (Note: Appearances in UEFA Champions League)	0	1 (Note: Appearance in Russian Super Cup)	0	27	2
CSKA Moscow	2019–20	Russian Premier League	27	2	1	0	6 (Note: Appearances in UEFA Europa League)	0	–		34	2
CSKA Moscow	2020–21	Russian Premier League	22	1	1	0	5	0	–		28	1
CSKA Moscow	2021–22	Russian Premier League	4	0	0	0	–		–		4	0
CSKA Moscow	Total		76	5	2	0	14	0	1	0	93	5
Panathinaikos	2022–23	Super League Greece	24	1	1	0	2 (Note: Appearances in UEFA Europa Conference League)	0	–		27	1
Panathinaikos	2023–24	Super League Greece	3	1	0	0	7	0	–		10	1
Panathinaikos	2024–25	Super League Greece	1	0	0	0	0	0	–		1	0
Panathinaikos	Total		28	2	1	0	9	0	0	0	38	2
Levadiakos	2025–26	Super League Greece	18	0	3	1	0	0	–		21	1
Career total			238	9	10	1	23	0	9	0	279	10

=== International ===
As of match played 13 November 2026

Appearances and goals by national team and year
National team	Year	Apps	Goals
Iceland	2014	1	0
Iceland	2015	1	0
Iceland	2016	6	0
Iceland	2017	7	2
Iceland	2018	8	0
Iceland	2019	5	0
Iceland	2020	6	0
Iceland	2021	2	0
Iceland	2022	8	0
Iceland	2023	5	0
Iceland	2024	0	0
Iceland	2025	2	0
Iceland	2026	7	0
Total		58	2

As of 11 June 2017

Scores and results list Iceland's goal tally first, score column indicates score after each Hörður goal.

List of international goals scored by Hörður Björgvin Magnússon
No.	Date	Venue	Opponent	Score	Result	Competition
1	28 March 2017	Aviva Stadium, Dublin, Republic of Ireland	Republic of Ireland	1–0	1–0	Friendly
2	11 June 2017	Laugardalsvöllur, Reykjavík, Iceland	Croatia	1–0	1–0	2018 FIFA World Cup qualification

== Honours ==
=== Club ===
CSKA Moscow

- Russian Super Cup: 2018

Panathinaikos

- Greek Cup: 2023–24

=== International ===
- Baltic Cup: 2022
