= Semyon Matviychuk =

Russian footballer

Personal information
- Full name: Semyon Olegovich Matviychuk
- Date of birth: 1 May 1998 (age 28)
- Place of birth: Tolyatti, Russia
- Height: 1.77 m (5 ft 10 in)
- Position: Defender

Youth career
- Konoplyov football academy
- –2017: FC Dynamo Moscow
- 2017–2019: PFC CSKA Moscow

Senior career*
Years	Team	Apps	(Gls)
2016	FC Dynamo-2 Moscow	6	(0)
2017–2019	PFC CSKA Moscow	0	(0)
2019–2021	FC SKA-Khabarovsk	20	(0)
2021	FC SKA-Khabarovsk-2	18	(2)
2022	FC Tekstilshchik Ivanovo	6	(0)
2023	FC Znamya Noginsk	28	(1)

International career^{‡}
2013	Russia U-15	2	(0)
2013–2014	Russia U-16	11	(0)
2014–2015	Russia U-17	14	(0)
2015–2016	Russia U-18	15	(0)
- * Club domestic league appearances and goals as of 12 November 2023 ‡ National team caps and goals as of 29 April 2016

Semyon Olegovich Matviychuk (Russian: Семён Олегович Матвийчук; born 1 May 1998) is a Russian football player.

== Club career ==
He made his debut in the Russian Professional Football League for FC Dynamo-2 Moscow on 3 October 2016 in a game against FC Strogino Moscow.

He made his debut for the main PFC CSKA Moscow squad on 10 October 2018 in a Russian Cup game against FC Tyumen.

He made his Russian Football National League debut for FC SKA-Khabarovsk on 7 July 2019 in a game against FC Shinnik Yaroslavl.

== International ==
He was a member of the Russia national under-17 football team at the 2015 FIFA U-17 World Cup and started in all four games the team played at the tournament.
