= Maksim Yedapin =

Russian footballer

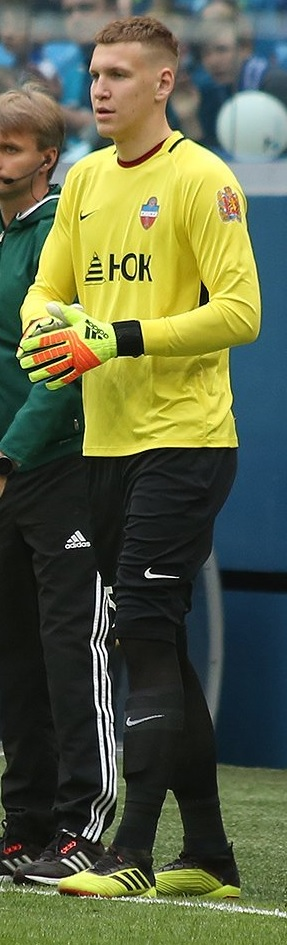
- Yedapin with Yenisey Krasnoyarsk in 2019

Personal information
- Full name: Maksim Olegovich Yedapin
- Date of birth: 3 April 2000 (age 26)
- Place of birth: Barnaul, Russia
- Height: 2.03 m (6 ft 8 in)
- Position: Goalkeeper

Team information
- Current team: Dynamo Barnaul
- Number: 95

Youth career
- –2012: Polimer Barnaul
- 2012: Altay Barnaul
- 2012–2015: CSKA Moscow

Senior career*
Years	Team	Apps	(Gls)
2015–2019	CSKA Moscow	0	(0)
2019	→ Yenisey Krasnoyarsk (loan)	1	(0)
2020–2021	Tyumen	15	(0)
2021–2022	Tekstilshchik Ivanovo	3	(0)
2022–2023	Tyumen	9	(0)
2023	Chelyabinsk	1	(0)
2024	Astrakhan	9	(0)
2025	Dynamo Barnaul	9	(0)
2025–2026	Tyumen	0	(0)
2026	Temp Barnaul		
2026–	Dynamo Barnaul	6	(0)

International career
2016	Russia U17	1	(0)
- * Club domestic league appearances and goals as of 1 November 2026

Maksim Olegovich Yedapin (Russian: Максим Олегович Едапин; born 3 April 2000) is a Russian football player who plays for Dynamo Barnaul.

== Club career ==
On 19 February 2019, he joined Yenisey Krasnoyarsk on loan.

He made his debut in the Russian Premier League for Yenisey Krasnoyarsk on 26 May 2019 in a game against Zenit St. Petersburg, as a 76th-minute substitute for David Yurchenko.

On 17 December 2019 he left CSKA upon the expiration of his contract.
