= Konstantin Bazelyuk =

Russian football forward (born 1993)

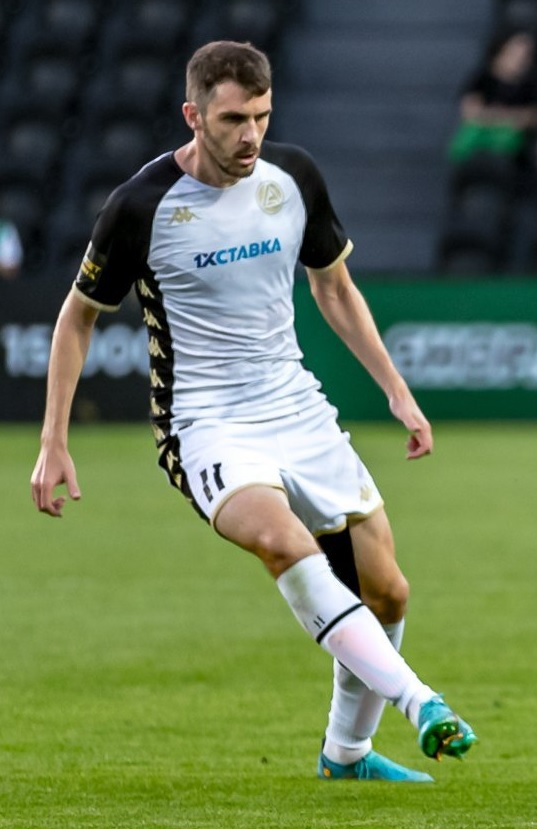
- Bazelyuk with Akron Tolyatti in 2022

Personal information
- Full name: Konstantin Sergeyevich Bazelyuk
- Date of birth: 12 April 1993 (age 33)
- Place of birth: Vityazevo, Krasnodar Krai, Russia
- Height: 1.85 m (6 ft 1 in)
- Position: Striker

Team information
- Current team: Lokomotiv Tashkent
- Number: 11

Youth career
- 2006–2013: CSKA Moscow

Senior career*
Years	Team	Apps	(Gls)
2013–2019	CSKA Moscow	18	(2)
2015	→ Torpedo Moscow (loan)	1	(0)
2015–2016	→ SKA-Khabarovsk (loan)	28	(10)
2016–2017	→ Estoril (loan)	11	(1)
2017–2018	→ Anzhi Makhachkala (loan)	6	(0)
2018	→ Zbrojovka Brno (loan)	12	(1)
2018–2019	→ SKA-Khabarovsk (loan)	31	(7)
2019	Mordovia Saransk	7	(1)
2019–2021	SKA-Khabarovsk	48	(15)
2021–2023	Akron Tolyatti	51	(11)
2023–2024	Neftekhimik Nizhnekamsk	31	(8)
2024–	Lokomotiv Tashkent	8	(0)

International career
2010–2011	Russia U18	6	(1)
2013–2014	Russia U21	8	(6)
- * Club domestic league appearances and goals as of 1 November 2024

Konstantin Sergeyevich Bazelyuk (Russian: Константин Сергеевич Базелюк; born 12 April 1993) is a Russian football forward who plays for Uzbekistani club Lokomotiv Tashkent.

== Career ==
=== Club ===
Born in Krasnodar Krai to a Russian father and a Pontic Greek mother.

Bazelyuk made his debut in the Russian Premier League for CSKA Moscow on 14 September 2013 in a game against Rostov. After coming as a substitute at the 68th minute, 3 minutes later he scored a goal, giving his team a 1–0 victory.

Bazelyuk won the award for the Russian League's Best Young Player 2013.

In June 2016, Bazelyuk joined Estoril on loan for the 2016–17 season.

On 20 June 2017, Bazelyuk signed another season-long loan contract, this time with Anzhi Makhachkala. On 11 January 2018, Bazelyuk's contract with Anzhi was terminated, and he joined Zbrojovka Brno on loan for the remainder of the 2017–18 season.

On 14 June 2018, CSKA Moscow announced that Bazelyuk would spend the 2018–19 season on loan at SKA-Khabarovsk. On 10 June 2019, CSKA Moscow announced that Bazelyuk had left the club following the expiration of his contract.

On 4 July 2019, he signed with Mordovia Saransk.

== Career statistics ==
As of 25 May 2024

Club	Season	League			Cup		Continental		Other		Total	
Club	Season	Division	Apps	Goals	Apps	Goals	Apps	Goals	Apps	Goals	Apps	Goals
CSKA Moscow	2012–13	Russian Premier League	0	0	1	0	0	0	–		1	0
CSKA Moscow	2013–14	Russian Premier League	17	2	4	1	2 (Note: Appearances in UEFA Champions League)	0	0	0	23	3
CSKA Moscow	2014–15	Russian Premier League	1	0	2	1	0	0	0	0	3	1
CSKA Moscow	2015–16	Russian Premier League	0	0	–		0	0	–		0	0
CSKA Moscow	Total		18	2	7	2	2	0	0	0	27	4
Torpedo Moscow (loan)	2014–15	Russian Premier League	1	0	–		–		–		1	0
SKA-Khabarovsk (loan)	2015–16	Russian First League	28	10	1	1	–		4 (Note: Appearances in the FNL Cup)	1	33	12
Estoril (loan)	2016–17	Primeira Liga	11	1	2	2	–		0	0	13	3
Anzhi Makhachkala (loan)	2017–18	Russian Premier League	6	0	0	0	–		–		6	0
Zbrojovka Brno (loan)	2017–18	Czech First League	12	1	–		–		–		12	1
SKA-Khabarovsk (loan)	2018–19	Russian First League	31	7	2	1	–		–		33	8
Mordovia Saransk	2019–20	Russian First League	7	1	0	0	–		–		7	1
SKA-Khabarovsk	2019–20	Russian First League	15	3	1	0	–		–		16	3
SKA-Khabarovsk	2020–21	Russian First League	33	12	4	0	–		–		37	12
SKA-Khabarovsk	Total		48	15	5	0	0	0	0	0	53	15
Akron Tolyatti	2021–22	Russian First League	35	9	1	0	–		–		36	9
Akron Tolyatti	2022–23	Russian First League	16	2	3	3	–		–		19	5
Akron Tolyatti	Total		51	11	4	3	0	0	0	0	55	14
Neftekhimik Nizhnekamsk	2022–23	Russian First League	14	6	–		–		–		14	6
Neftekhimik Nizhnekamsk	2023–24	Russian First League	17	2	0	0	–		–		17	2
Neftekhimik Nizhnekamsk	Total		31	8	0	0	0	0	0	0	31	8
Career total			244	56	21	9	2	0	4	1	271	66

== Honours ==
=== Club ===
CSKA Moscow

- Russian Premier League (1): 2013–14
