= Ivan Maklakov =

Russian footballer

Personal information
- Full name: Ivan Romanovich Maklakov
- Date of birth: 17 April 1998 (age 28)
- Place of birth: Orekhovo-Zuyevo, Russia
- Height: 1.77 m (5 ft 10 in)
- Position: Defender

Team information
- Current team: Dynamo Bryansk
- Number: 23

Senior career*
Years	Team	Apps	(Gls)
2018	CSKA Moscow	0	(0)
2019	Zenit-2 St. Petersburg	8	(0)
2019–2022	Baltika Kaliningrad	48	(1)
2022	Baltika-BFU Kaliningrad	5	(0)
2022	Shinnik Yaroslavl	2	(0)
2023–2024	Chernomorets Novorossiysk	27	(2)
2024–2026	Veles Moscow	26	(0)
2026–	Dynamo Bryansk	16	(1)

International career
2013	Russia U15	2	(0)
2013–2014	Russia U16	11	(0)
2014	Russia U17	2	(0)
- * Club domestic league appearances and goals as of 15 November 2026

Ivan Romanovich Maklakov (Russian: Иван Романович Маклаков; born 17 April 1998) is a Russian football player who plays for Dynamo Bryansk.

== Club career ==
He made his debut for the main CSKA Moscow squad on 10 October 2018 in a Russian Cup game against Tyumen.

In February 2019, he moved to Zenit-2 St. Petersburg. He made his debut in the Russian Football National League for Zenit-2 on 24 March 2019 in a game against Khimki.

On 18 June 2019, he signed a 3-year contract with Baltika Kaliningrad.
