= Astemir Gordyushenko =

Russian footballer

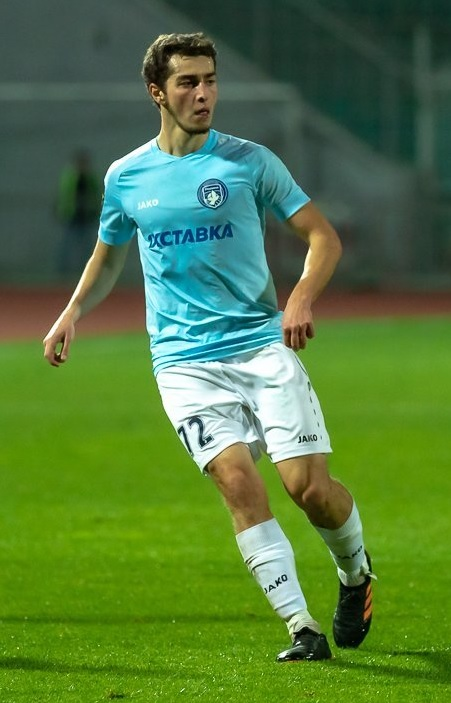
- Gordyushenko with Rodina Moscow in 2022

Personal information
- Full name: Astemir Aleksandrovich Gordyushenko
- Date of birth: 30 March 1997 (age 29)
- Place of birth: Nalchik, Russia
- Height: 1.76 m (5 ft 9 in)
- Position: Midfielder

Team information
- Current team: Rodina Moscow
- Number: 72

Senior career*
Years	Team	Apps	(Gls)
2016–2020	CSKA Moscow	11	(0)
2019	→ Tyumen (loan)	10	(1)
2020–2021	Torpedo Moscow	22	(2)
2021–2022	Tom Tomsk	35	(2)
2022–	Rodina Moscow	109	(16)
2026	→ Rodina-2 Moscow	10	(1)

International career^{‡}
2016	Russia U-19	1	(0)
- * Club domestic league appearances and goals as of 11 September 2026 ‡ National team caps and goals as of 24 March 2016

Astemir Aleksandrovich Gordyushenko (Russian: Астемир Александрович Гордюшенко; born 30 March 1997) is a Russian football player who plays as a central midfielder for Rodina Moscow.

== Career ==
=== Club ===
Gordyushenko made his debut for the main squad of PFC CSKA Moscow in the Russian Cup game against FC Yenisey Krasnoyarsk on 21 September 2016, with his Russian Premier League debut for CSKA Moscow coming on 2 October 2016 against FC Rostov.

On 21 November 2016, Gordyushenko extended his contract with CSKA Moscow until the end of the 2019–20 season.

On 25 January 2019, he joined Tyumen on loan until the end of the 2018–19 season.

On 13 February 2020, CSKA Moscow confirmed that Gordyushenko had left the club to join Torpedo Moscow.

== Career statistics ==
=== Club ===
As of match played 15 October 2026

Club	Season	League			Cup		Continental		Other		Total	
Club	Season	Division	Apps	Goals	Apps	Goals	Apps	Goals	Apps	Goals	Apps	Goals
CSKA Moscow	2015–16	Russian Premier League	0	0	0	0	0	0	–		0	0
CSKA Moscow	2016–17	Russian Premier League	3	0	1	0	2 (Note: Appearances in the UEFA Champions League)	0	0	0	6	0
CSKA Moscow	2017–18	Russian Premier League	6	0	1	0	3 (Note: Two appearances in the UEFA Champions League, one appearance in the UEFA Europa League)	0	–		10	0
CSKA Moscow	2018–19	Russian Premier League	2	0	1	0	0	0	0	0	3	0
CSKA Moscow	2019–20	Russian Premier League	0	0	0	0	0	0	–		0	0
CSKA Moscow	Total		11	0	3	0	5	0	0	0	19	0
Tyumen (loan)	2018–19	Russian First League	10	1	–		–		4 (Note: Appearances in the FNL Cup)	0	14	1
Torpedo Moscow	2019–20	Russian First League	2	0	1	0	–		–		3	0
Torpedo Moscow	2020–21	Russian First League	20	2	1	0	–		–		21	2
Torpedo Moscow	2021–22	Russian First League	0	0	–		–		–		0	0
Torpedo Moscow	Total		22	2	2	0	0	0	0	0	24	2
Tom Tomsk	2021–22	Russian First League	35	2	1	0	–		–		36	2
Rodina Moscow	2022–23	Russian First League	28	5	1	1	–		2 (Note: Appearances in the promotion play-offs)	0	31	6
Rodina Moscow	2023–24	Russian First League	33	10	2	0	–		–		35	10
Rodina Moscow	2024–25	Russian First League	30	1	1	0	–		–		31	1
Rodina Moscow	2025–26	Russian First League	15	0	1	0	–		–		16	0
Rodina Moscow	2026–27	Russian Premier League	3	0	4	0	–		–		7	0
Rodina Moscow	Total		109	16	9	1	0	0	2	0	120	17
Rodina-2 Moscow	2025–26	Russian Second League A	10	1	–		–		–		10	1
Career total			197	22	15	1	5	0	6	0	223	23
