= Kirill Levnikov =

Russian footballer and referee

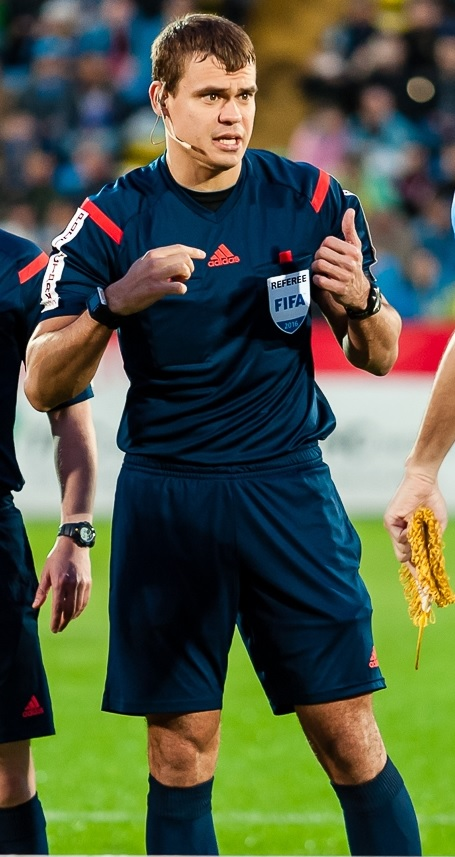
- Levnikov in 2016
- Born: Kirill Nikolayevich Levnikov; 11 February 1984 (age 42); Leningrad, Russian SFSR
Association football career
- Position: Defender
Senior career*
Years	Team	Apps	(Gls)
2002	FC Primorets St. Petersburg		
2003	FC Pskov-2000 Pskov	3	(0)
2005–2006	FC Salyut-Energia Belgorod	13	(1)
2007	FC Sever Murmansk (amateur)		
2007	FC Dynamo-2 St. Petersburg		
2008–2009	FC Evrostroy Vsevolozhsk		
- * Club domestic league appearances and goals
Refereeing career
Domestic
Years	League	Role
2011–2013	PFL	Referee
2012–2015	FNL	Referee
2014–	RFPL	Referee
International
Years	League	Role
2016–	FIFA	Referee

Kirill Nikolayevich Levnikov (Russian: Кирилл Николаевич Левников; born 11 February 1984) is a Russian professional football referee and a former player.

He has been a FIFA referee since 2016.

His father Nikolai Levnikov was also an international referee.
