= Timur Pukhov =

Russian footballer

Personal information
- Full name: Timur Taimurazovich Pukhov
- Date of birth: 17 June 1998 (age 28)
- Place of birth: Vladikavkaz, Russia
- Height: 1.75 m (5 ft 9 in)
- Position: Midfielder

Team information
- Current team: Baranovichi
- Number: 7

Youth career
- –2011: Spartak Vladikavkaz
- 2011–2013: Konoplyov football academy
- 2013–2014: CSKA Moscow

Senior career*
Years	Team	Apps	(Gls)
2015–2018	CSKA Moscow	0	(0)
2019	Žalgiris	2	(0)
2019–2020	Shinnik Yaroslavl	36	(4)
2021	Irtysh Omsk	10	(0)
2021	Novosibirsk	9	(0)
2022	Amkar Perm	8	(0)
2022	Ararat Yerevan	7	(0)
2023	Naftan Novopolotsk	21	(3)
2024	Gomel	15	(2)
2024–2025	Maxline Vitebsk	21	(1)
2026–	Baranovichi	6	(0)
- * Club domestic league appearances and goals as of 3 July 2026

Timur Taimurazovich Pukhov (Russian: Тимур Таймуразович Пухов; born 17 June 1998) is a Russian professionalfootballer who plays as a midfielder for Baranovichi.

== Club career ==
He made his debut for the main PFC CSKA Moscow squad on 10 October 2018 in a Russian Cup game against FC Tyumen and scored a goal on his debut.

On 8 February 2019 he moved to Lithuania, becoming a player of FK Žalgiris. He was assigned number 70 shirt.

On 3 July 2019, he signed with FC Shinnik Yaroslavl. He made his Russian Football National League debut for Shinnik on 13 July 2019 in a game against FC Mordovia Saransk.

On 10 December 2022, Ararat Yerevan announced that Pukhov had left by mutual consent.

In March 2023, the footballer joined the Belarusian club Naftan. In February 2024, the footballer moved to the Belarusian club Gomel.
