= 2019–20 PFC CSKA Moscow season =

CSKA Moscow
2019–20 season
- Chairman: Yevgeni Giner
- Manager: Viktor Goncharenko
- Stadium: VEB Arena
- Premier League: 4th
- Russian Cup: Quarter-finals
- Europa League: Group stage
- Top goalscorer: League: Nikola Vlašić (12); All: Nikola Vlašić (13)
| Home colours | Away colours |

The 2019–20 PFC CSKA Moscow season was the 28th successive season that the club play in the Russian Premier League, the highest tier of association football in Russia.

== Season events ==
On 7 June, the calendar for the 2019–20 Russian Premier League season was released, with CSKA starting their season away to Krylia Sovetov and finishing the season at home to newly promoted Tambov. On 14 June, Timur Zhamaletdinov extended his contract with CSKA until the summer of 2020/21, and extended his loan deal with Lech Poznań until the end of the 2019/20 season. On 19 June, CSKA announced the signing of Nikola Vlašić on a five-year contract for an undisclosed fee from Everton., and that Ivan Oleynikov had left the club do join Shinnik Yaroslavl.

On 21 June, Alan Dzagoev signed a new two-year contract with CSKA, keeping him at the club until the summer of 2021. On 27 June, Arsenal Tula announced the permanent singing of Sergei Tkachyov from CSKA. On 29 June, Slaven Belupo announced that Zvonimir Šarlija had moved to CSKA Moscow, with CSKA confirming the season-long loan deal, with the first option to buy, on 1 July.

On 1 July, Vitali Zhironkin joined Baltika Kaliningrad on a season-long loan deal, whilst Semyon Matviychuk moved permanently to SKA-Khabarovsk. On 5 July, Khetag Khosonov returned to FC Tambov on loan for the 2019/20 season. On 30 July, Nikita Chernov moved to Krylia Sovetov.

On 22 August, Georgi Kyrnats moved to SKA-Khabarovsk. On 29 August, CSKA Moscow announced the signing of Cédric Gogoua on a four-year contract from Tambov. On 30 August, CSKA Moscow announced that Aleksandr Makarov had moved to Avangard Kursk on a permanent transfer.

On 2 September, Lucas Santos signed on loan from Vasco da Gama until 31 December 2019.

On 17 December, Dmitry Yefremov, Maksim Yedapin and Danil Savinykh left the club after the expiration of their contracts, whilst Konstantin Kuchayev extended his contract until 2023.

On 30 December, Vladislav Torop extended his contract with CSKA until the end of 2022.

On 9 January, CSKA Moscow announced the signing of Ilya Shkurin on a 4.5-year contract from Dynamo Brest. The following day, CSKA Moscow confirmed that Takuma Nishimura had joined Portimonense on loan for the remainder of the season, whilst Lucas Santos had returned to Vasco da Gama after his loan had expired.

On 18 January, Zvonimir Šarlija's loan with CSKA Moscow ended, with Šarlija moving on loan to Kasımpaşa from Slaven Belupo. On 20 January, Nayair Tiknizyan moved on loan to Avangard Kursk until the end of the season.

On 24 January, Danila Yanov left CSKA Moscow to join Riga FC for an undisclosed fee.

On 31 January, CSKA Moscow announced the signing of Nikita Kotin on a 3.5-year contract from Krylia Sovetov.

On 13 February, Astemir Gordyushenko left CSKA Moscow to join Torpedo Moscow.

On 16 March, CSKA's home game against Zenit St.Petersburg scheduled for 22 March, was postponed after the Mayor of Moscow banned outdoor sporting events due to the COVID-19 pandemic.

On 17 March, the Russian Premier League postponed all league fixtures until April 10 due to the COVID-19 pandemic.

On 26 March, Takuma Nishimura's loan deal at Portimonense was ended early to allow Nishimura to return to Vegalta Sendai on loan until June.

On 1 April, the Russian Football Union extended the suspension of football until 31 May.

On 15 May, the Russian Football Union announced that the Russian Premier League season would resume on 21 June.

On 20 May, CSKA announced that Viktor Goncharenko had extended his contract with the club until the summer of 2021.

On 16 June 2020, CSKA announced that youngsters Nikolay Zirikov and Yegor Teslenko had left the club at the end of their contracts, whilst Aleksei Sukharev had also left the club after his loan deal expired.

On 23 June 2020, CSKA announced that Sergei Ovchinnikov would take charge of the team for their upcoming fixture against Dynamo Moscow on 27 June due to Viktor Goncharenko feeling unwell. Later the same day, CSKA announced that Konstantin Maradishvili had extended his contract with CSKA Moscow until the summer of 2025.

On 24 June 2020, CSKA announced the signing of Gocha Gogrichiani from Rostov.

On 29 June 2020, CSKA announced that they had signed a long-term agreement with Joma to be their technical sponsor from the 2020/21 season.

On 20 July, CSKA announced that Vitali Zhironkin would return to Baltika Kaliningrad on loan for the 2020/21 season.

== Squad ==
As of match played 22 July 2020

| Number | Name | Nationality | Position | Date of birth (age) | Signed from | Signed in | Contract ends | Apps. | Goals |
Goalkeepers
| 1 | Ilya Pomazun | (Russia) | GK | 16 August 1996 (aged 23) | Academy | 2012 | | 7 | 0 |
| 35 | Igor Akinfeev | (Russia) | GK | 8 April 1986 (aged 34) | Academy | 2003 | 2022 | 637 | 0 |
| 49 | Vladislav Torop | (Russia) | GK | 7 November 2003 (aged 16) | Academy | 2019 | 2022 | 0 | 0 |
Defenders
| 2 | Mário Fernandes | (Russia) | DF | 19 September 1990 (aged 29) | Grêmio | 2012 | 2022 | 272 | 6 |
| 5 | Viktor Vasin | (Russia) | DF | 6 October 1988 (aged 31) | Spartak Nalchik | 2011 | 2021 | 75 | 2 |
| 13 | Nikita Kotin | (Russia) | DF | 1 September 2002 (aged 17) | Krylia Sovetov | 2020 | 2023 | 0 | 0 |
| 14 | Kirill Nababkin | (Russia) | DF | 8 September 1986 (aged 33) | Moscow | 2010 | 2020 | 249 | 4 |
| 23 | Hörður Magnússon | (Iceland) | DF | 11 February 1993 (aged 27) | Bristol City | 2018 | | 61 | 4 |
| 27 | Cédric Gogoua | (Ivory Coast) | DF | 10 July 1994 (aged 26) | Tambov | 2019 | 2023 | 5 | 1 |
| 42 | Georgi Shchennikov | (Russia) | DF | 27 April 1991 (aged 29) | Academy | 2008 | 2023 | 317 | 10 |
| 53 | Maksim Yeleyev | (Russia) | DF | 3 March 2001 (aged 19) | Academy | 2019 | | 1 | 0 |
| 62 | Vadim Karpov | (Russia) | DF | 14 July 2002 (aged 18) | Academy | 2019 | | 19 | 0 |
| 78 | Igor Diveyev | (Russia) | DF | 27 September 1999 (aged 20) | Ufa | 2019 | 2024 | 45 | 2 |
Midfielders
| 7 | Ilzat Akhmetov | (Russia) | MF | 31 December 1997 (aged 22) | Rubin Kazan | 2018 | 2022 | 60 | 4 |
| 8 | Nikola Vlašić | (Croatia) | MF | 4 October 1997 (aged 22) | Everton | 2019 | 2024 | 69 | 21 |
| 10 | Alan Dzagoev | (Russia) | MF | 17 June 1990 (aged 30) | Krylia Sovetov-SOK Dimitrovgrad | 2008 | 2021 | 354 | 75 |
| 17 | Arnór Sigurðsson | (Iceland) | MF | 15 May 1999 (aged 21) | IFK Norrköping | 2018 | 2023 | 56 | 11 |
| 20 | Konstantin Kuchayev | (Russia) | MF | 18 March 1998 (aged 22) | Academy | 2015 | 2023 | 75 | 1 |
| 25 | Kristijan Bistrović | (Croatia) | MF | 9 April 1998 (aged 22) | Slaven Belupo | 2018 | 2022 | 68 | 3 |
| 29 | Jaka Bijol | (Slovenia) | MF | 5 February 1999 (aged 21) | Rudar Velenje | 2018 | 2023 | 61 | 6 |
| 71 | Nayair Tiknizyan | (Russia) | MF | 12 May 1999 (aged 21) | Academy | 2013 | 2022 | 8 | 0 |
| 75 | Ruslan Daurov | (Russia) | MF | 11 September 2002 (aged 17) | Spartak Vladikavkaz | 2019 | | 0 | 0 |
| 80 | Khetag Khosonov | (Russia) | MF | 18 June 1998 (aged 22) | Academy | 2014 | | 17 | 1 |
| 87 | Konstantin Maradishvili | (Russia) | MF | 7 February 2000 (aged 20) | Academy | 2019 | 2025 | 11 | 0 |
| 98 | Ivan Oblyakov | (Russia) | MF | 5 July 1998 (aged 22) | Ufa | 2018 | 2023 | 66 | 7 |
| | Gocha Gogrichiani | (Russia) | MF | 5 May 2000 (aged 20) | Rostov | 2020 | | 0 | 0 |
Forwards
| 9 | Fyodor Chalov | (Russia) | FW | 10 April 1998 (aged 22) | Academy | 2015 | 2022 | 125 | 39 |
| 18 | Lassana N'Diaye | (Mali) | FW | 3 October 2000 (aged 19) | Guidars | 2018 | 2023 | 0 | 0 |
| 99 | Ilya Shkurin | (Belarus) | FW | 17 August 1999 (aged 20) | Dynamo Brest | 2020 | 2024 | 5 | 0 |
Away on loan
| 19 | Takuma Nishimura | (Japan) | FW | 15 May 1999 (aged 21) | IFK Norrköping | 2018 | 2022 | 23 | 4 |
| 75 | Timur Zhamaletdinov | (Russia) | FW | 21 May 1997 (aged 23) | Academy | 2014 | 2021 | 42 | 5 |
| 81 | Vitali Zhironkin | (Russia) | FW | 10 March 2000 (aged 20) | Academy | 2018 | 2022 | 0 | 0 |
Players who left during the season
| 3 | Nikita Chernov | (Russia) | DF | 14 January 1996 (aged 24) | Academy | 2013 | | 20 | 0 |
| 11 | Lucas Santos | (Brazil) | MF | 7 March 1999 (aged 21) | Vasco da Gama | 2019 | 2019 | 5 | 0 |
| 15 | Dmitry Yefremov | (Russia) | MF | 1 April 1995 (aged 25) | Akademiya Tolyatti | 2013 | 2019 | 54 | 0 |
| 22 | Georgi Kyrnats | (Russia) | GK | 22 June 1998 (aged 22) | Academy | 2015 | | 1 | 0 |
| 31 | Aleksandr Makarov | (Russia) | MF | 24 April 1996 (aged 24) | Academy | 2013 | | 2 | 0 |
| 31 | Zvonimir Šarlija | (Croatia) | DF | 29 August 1996 (aged 23) | loan from Slaven Belupo | 2019 | 2019 | 14 | 0 |
| 72 | Astemir Gordyushenko | (Russia) | MF | 30 March 1997 (aged 23) | Academy | 2016 | 2020 | 19 | 0 |
| 85 | Danila Yanov | (Russia) | FW | 27 January 2000 (aged 20) | Strogino Moscow | 2018 | | 0 | 0 |
| 92 | Aleksei Sukharev | (Russia) | DF | 11 January 2003 (aged 17) | loan from Avangard Kursk | 2020 | 2020 | 0 | 0 |
| 95 | Maksim Yedapin | (Russia) | GK | 3 April 2000 (aged 20) | Academy | 2015 | 2019 | 0 | 0 |

=== Out on loan ===
Note: Flags indicate national team as defined under FIFA eligibility rules; some limited exceptions apply. Players may hold more than one non-FIFA nationality.

| No. | Pos. | Nation | Player |
|---|---|---|---|
| 19 | FW | JPN | Takuma Nishimura (at Vegalta Sendai) |
| 75 | MF | RUS | Timur Zhamaletdinov (at Lech Poznań) |

| No. | Pos. | Nation | Player |
|---|---|---|---|
| 81 | FW | RUS | Vitali Zhironkin (at Baltika Kaliningrad) |

== Transfers ==
=== In ===
| Date | Position | Nationality | Name | From | Fee | Ref. |
|---|---|---|---|---|---|---|
| 19 June 2019 | MF | (Croatia) | Nikola Vlašić | Everton | Undisclosed | |
| 29 August 2019 | DF | (Ivory Coast) | Cédric Gogoua | Tambov | Undisclosed | |
| 14 October 2020 | MF | (Russia) | Ruslan Daurov | Spartak Vladikavkaz | Undisclosed | |
| 9 January 2020 | FW | (Belarus) | Ilya Shkurin | Dynamo Brest | Undisclosed | |
| 31 January 2020 | DF | (Russia) | Nikita Kotin | Krylia Sovetov | Undisclosed | |
| 24 June 2020 | MF | (Russia) | Gocha Gogrichiani | Rostov | Undisclosed | |

=== Loans in ===
| Date from | Position | Nationality | Name | From | Date to | Ref. |
|---|---|---|---|---|---|---|
| 29 June 2019 | DF | (Croatia) | Zvonimir Šarlija | Slaven Belupo | 18 January 2020 | |
| 2 September 2019 | MF | (Brazil) | Lucas Santos | Vasco da Gama | 31 December 2019 | |
| 21 February 2020 | DF | (Russia) | Aleksei Sukharev | Avangard Kursk | 16 June 2020 | |

=== Out ===
| Date | Position | Nationality | Name | To | Fee | Ref. |
|---|---|---|---|---|---|---|
| 19 June 2019 | MF | (Russia) | Ivan Oleynikov | Shinnik Yaroslavl | Undisclosed | |
| 27 June 2019 | MF | (Russia) | Sergei Tkachyov | Arsenal Tula | Undisclosed | |
| 1 July 2019 | DF | (Russia) | Semyon Matviychuk | SKA-Khabarovsk | Undisclosed | |
| 30 July 2019 | DF | (Russia) | Nikita Chernov | Krylia Sovetov | Undisclosed | |
| 22 August 2019 | GK | (Russia) | Georgi Kyrnats | SKA-Khabarovsk | Undisclosed | |
| 30 August 2019 | MF | (Russia) | Aleksandr Makarov | Avangard Kursk | Undisclosed | |
| 24 January 2020 | FW | (Russia) | Danila Yanov | Riga | Undisclosed | |
| 13 February 2020 | MF | (Russia) | Astemir Gordyushenko | Torpedo Moscow | Undisclosed | |

=== Loans out ===
| Date from | Position | Nationality | Name | To | Date to | Ref. |
|---|---|---|---|---|---|---|
| 24 January 2019 | FW | (Russia) | Timur Zhamaletdinov | Lech Poznań | End of Season | |
| 1 July 2019 | FW | (Russia) | Vitali Zhironkin | Baltika Kaliningrad | End of Season | |
| 5 July 2019 | MF | (Russia) | Khetag Khosonov | Tambov | End of Season | |
| 10 January 2020 | FW | (Japan) | Takuma Nishimura | Portimonense | 26 March 2020 | |
| 20 January 2020 | MF | (Russia) | Nayair Tiknizyan | Avangard Kursk | End of Season | |
| 26 March 2020 | FW | (Japan) | Takuma Nishimura | Vegalta Sendai | End of Season | |
| 20 July 2020 | FW | (Russia) | Vitali Zhironkin | Baltika Kaliningrad | End of 2020/21 Season | |

=== Released ===
| Date | Position | Nationality | Name | Joined | Date |
|---|---|---|---|---|---|
| 10 June 2019 | FW | (Russia) | Konstantin Bazelyuk | Mordovia Saransk | 3 July 2019 |
| 17 December 2019 | GK | (Russia) | Maksim Yedapin | Tyumen | |
| 17 December 2019 | DF | (Russia) | Danil Savinykh | | |
| 17 December 2019 | MF | (Russia) | Dmitry Yefremov | Ural Yekaterinburg | 18 February 2020 |
| 16 June 2020 | GK | (Russia) | Nikolay Zirikov | | |
| 16 June 2020 | DF | (Russia) | Yegor Teslenko | KAMAZ Naberezhnye Chelny | 14 July 2020 |

=== Trial ===
| Date From | Date To | Position | Nationality | Name | Last club | Ref. |
|---|---|---|---|---|---|---|
| 25 June 2019 | | DF | (Croatia) | Zvonimir Šarlija | Slaven Belupo | |
| 4 February 2020 | 17 February 2020 | MF | (Russia) | Kirill Kolesnichenko | Chertanovo Moscow | |
| January 2020 | 12 February 2020 | FW | (Russia) | David Karayev | KAMAZ Naberezhnye Chelny | |

== Friendlies ==
| 27 June 2019 Match TV Cup | CSKA Moscow | 0–1 | Krasnodar | Pöllau, Austria |
| MSK (UTC+3) | Martynovich 45' | Report | T.Avanesyan (yellow card) 76' | Stadium: Sparkasse Pöllau AG stadium |

| 30 June 2019 Match TV Cup | CSKA Moscow | 1–3 | Spartak Moscow | Pöllau, Austria |
| 19:00 MSK (UTC+3) | Šarlija (yellow card) 12'; Lomovitsky 27' (o.g.); Nababkin (yellow card) 42' (red card) 44' | Report | Z.Bakayev 7'; Gaponov 59'; Hanni 60' | Stadium: Sparkasse Pöllau AG stadium |

| 3 July 2019 Match TV Cup | CSKA Moscow | 1–2 | Rostov | Pöllau, Austria |
| MSK (UTC+3) | Chalov 28' | Report | Shomurodov 10', 44' | Stadium: Sparkasse Pöllau AG stadium |

| 9 July 2019 | CSKA Moscow | 4–0 | Rubin Kazan | Moscow |
| 16:00 MSK (UTC+3) | Sigurðsson 14', 79', 80'; Chalov 87' | Report | | Stadium: Vatutinki Stadium; Attendance: 500 |

| 9 September 2019 | CSKA Moscow | 6–0 | Ararat Moscow | Moscow |
| 12:00 MSK (UTC+3) | Nishimura 20', 42' (pen.), 60'; Yeleyev 22'; Maradishvili 28'; Santos 58' | Report | | Stadium: Vatutinki Stadium; Attendance: 500 |

| 14 October 2019 | CSKA Moscow | 5–1 | Kolomna | Moscow |
| 14:00 MSK (UTC+3) | Santos 13', 27'; Maradishvili 35'; Tiknizyan 36'; Vostrikov 84' | Report | Burlutsky 22' | Stadium: October Stadium |

| 18 November 2019 | CSKA Moscow | 5–1 | SKA Rostov | Moscow |
| 12:00 MSK (UTC+3) | Tiknizyan 3'; Nishimura 7', 22'; Santos 40'; Gogoua 49' | Report | D.Ivankov 22' | Stadium: October Stadium |

| 24 January 2020 | CSKA Moscow (Russia) | 2–0 | (Republic of Ireland) Dundalk | Dehesa de Campoamor, Spain |
| 19:00 MSK (UTC+3) | Sigurðsson 5', 12' (penalty missed) 31' | Report |

| 25 January 2020 | CSKA Moscow (Russia) | 2–1 | (Austria) LASK | Dehesa de Campoamor, Spain |
| 14:00 MSK (UTC+3) | Vlašić 16', 88' | Report | Balich 60' |

| 1 February 2020 | CSKA Moscow (Russia) | 2–2 | (Austria) WSG Swarovski Tirol | Dehesa de Campoamor, Spain |
| 19:00 MSK (UTC+3) | Vlašić 41' (pen.); Bijol 79' | Report | Dedić 44'; Maierhofer 58' |

| 5 February 2020 | CSKA Moscow (Russia) | 2–0 | (Spain) Orihuela | Dehesa de Campoamor, Spain |
| MSK (UTC+3) | Karayev 45'; Shkurin 78' | Report |

| 5 February 2020 | CSKA Moscow (Russia) | 2–0 | (Denmark) Nordsjælland | Dehesa de Campoamor, Spain |
| 19:00 MSK (UTC+3) | Vlašić 14'; Akhmetov 54'; Bistrović (yellow card) 64' | Report |

| 8 February 2020 | CSKA Moscow (Russia) | 3–1 | (Norway) Odd | Dehesa de Campoamor, Spain |
| 18:00 MSK (UTC+3) | Bijol 4'; Shkurin 24'; Maradishvili 38' | Report | Børven 12' |

| 9 February 2020 | CSKA Moscow | 2–3 | Zenit St.Petersburg | La Nucia, Spain |
| 16:00 MSK (UTC+3) | Bistrović 22'; Chalov 43' | Report | Dzyuba 59', 61'; Azmoun 64' | Stadium: Camilo Cano |

| 15 February 2020 | CSKA Moscow (Russia) | 5–0 | (Switzerland) Delémont | Dehesa de Campoamor, Spain |
| 14:00 MSK (UTC+3) | Dzagoev 30' (pen.); Shkurin 45'; Kuchayev 47', 58', 65' | Report |

| 15 February 2020 | CSKA Moscow (Russia) | 2–0 | (Sweden) IK Sirius | Dehesa de Campoamor, Spain |
| 16:00 MSK (UTC+3) | Oblyakov 57'; Vlašić 65' | Report |

| 19 February 2020 | CSKA Moscow (Russia) | 2–0 | (Spain) Cartagena | Dehesa de Campoamor, Spain |
| 22:00 MSK (UTC+3) | Bijol (yellow card) 29'; Vlašić 32'; Maradishvili 48'; Gogoua (yellow card) 75' | Report |

| 21 February 2020 | CSKA Moscow (Russia) | 3–0 | (Switzerland) Rapperswil-Jona | Dehesa de Campoamor, Spain |
| 14:00 MSK (UTC+3) | Diveyev 17'; Maradishvili 76'; Gogoua 88' | Report |

| 22 February 2020 | CSKA Moscow | 3–0 | Ufa | Dehesa de Campoamor, Spain |
| 18:00 MSK (UTC+3) | Sigurðsson 47', 83', 85' | Report |

== Competitions ==
=== Premier League ===
==== Results by round ====
| Round | 1 | 2 | 3 | 4 | 5 | 6 | 7 | 8 | 9 | 10 | 11 | 12 | 13 | 14 | 15 | 16 | 17 | 18 | 19 | 20 | 21 | 22 | 23 | 24 | 25 | 26 | 27 | 28 | 29 | 30 |
|---|---|---|---|---|---|---|---|---|---|---|---|---|---|---|---|---|---|---|---|---|---|---|---|---|---|---|---|---|---|---|
| Ground | A | H | H | A | H | A | H | A | A | H | A | H | A | H | A | A | H | H | A | H | A | H | H | A | H | A | A | H | A | H |
| Result | L | W | W | W | D | L | W | W | W | W | W | L | D | L | D | W | W | D | D | D | L | D | L | D | W | W | W | D | L | W |
| Position | 16 | 10 | 6 | 2 | 3 | 6 | 6 | 4 | 4 | 2 | 1 | 5 | 5 | 5 | 5 | 4 | 3 | 4 | 4 | 4 | 5 | 5 | 5 | 5 | 5 | 5 | 3 | 4 | 4 | 4 |

Updated to match(es) played on 22 July 2020. Source: See Results
A = Away; H = Home; W = Win; D = Draw; L = Loss

==== Results ====
| 14 July 2019 1 | Krylia Sovetov | 2–0 | CSKA Moscow | Samara |
| 16:30 MSK (UTC+3) | Kombarov (yellow card) 38'; Sobolev 51', 58' (pen.) | Report | Vasin (yellow card) 31'; Šarlija (yellow card) 46'; Chalov (yellow card) 78' | Stadium: Samara Arena; Attendance: 25,287; Referee: Kirill Levnikov |

| 20 July 2019 2 | CSKA Moscow | 2–1 | Orenburg | Moscow |
| 19:00 MSK (UTC+3) | Vlašić 30'; Sigurðsson 38' (yellow card) 79'; Akinfeev (yellow card) 72' | Report | Malyarov 40'; Shakhov (yellow card) 53'; Ayupov (yellow card) 72'; Terekhov (yellow card) 79' | Stadium: VEB Arena; Attendance: 15,082; Referee: Evgeny Turbin |

| 28 July 2019 3 | CSKA Moscow | 1–0 | Lokomotiv Moscow | Moscow |
| 19:00 MSK (UTC+3) | Bistrović (yellow card) 4'; Magnússon (yellow card) 39'; Chalov 42' (pen.); Diveyev (yellow card) 58'; Šarlija (yellow card) 74' | Report | Krychowiak (yellow card) 48'; Ćorluka (yellow card) 90' | Stadium: VEB Arena; Attendance: 27,897; Referee: Vladislav Bezborodov |

| 4 August 2019 4 | Rubin Kazan | 0–1 | CSKA Moscow | Kazan |
| 19:00 MSK (UTC+3) | Mikeltadze (yellow card) 60'; Uremović (yellow card) 76'; Podberyozkin (yellow card) 85' | Report | Chalov 41'; Akhmetov (yellow card) 50'; Bistrović (yellow card) 64'; Oblyakov (yellow card) 66' | Stadium: Central Stadium; Attendance: 20,791; Referee: Vasili Kazartsev |

| 11 August 2019 5 | CSKA Moscow | 0–0 | Sochi | Moscow |
| 19:00 MSK (UTC+3) | Oblyakov (yellow card) 41' | Report | Dzhanayev (yellow card) 42'; Kudryashov (yellow card) 49'; Karapetian (yellow card) 66' | Stadium: VEB Arena; Attendance: 17,995; Referee: Vitaly Meshkov |

| 19 August 2019 6 | Spartak Moscow | 2–1 | CSKA Moscow | Moscow |
| 20:00 MSK (UTC+3) | Larsson (yellow card) 36'; Gigot 59', 79' | Report | Fernandes 68'; Magnússon (yellow card) 71'; Nababkin (yellow card) 90+5' | Stadium: Otkritie Arena; Attendance: 44,434; Referee: Sergei Karasev |

| 25 August 2019 7 | CSKA Moscow | 3–0 | Akhmat Grozny | Moscow |
| 16:30 MSK (UTC+3) | Magnússon (yellow card) 34'; Fernandes 43'; Kuchayev (yellow card) 52'; Šarlija (yellow card) 62'; Chalov 66'; Vlašić 73' | Report | Ivanov (yellow card) 32'; Kharin (yellow card) 41'; Ángel (yellow card) 62'; Semyonov (yellow card) 62' | Stadium: VEB Arena; Attendance: 18,508; Referee: Vasili Kazartsev |

| 1 September 2019 8 | Arsenal Tula | 1–2 | CSKA Moscow | Tula |
| 16:30 MSK (UTC+3) | Lesovoy 10'; Čaušić (yellow card) 38'; Lomovitsky (yellow card) 73' | Report | Akhmetov 17'; Oblyakov (yellow card) 49'; Gogoua 74' | Stadium: Arsenal Stadium; Attendance: 18,758; Referee: Evgeny Turbin |

| 15 September 2019 9 | Tambov | 0–2 | CSKA Moscow | Saransk |
| 16:30 MSK (UTC+3) | Ciupercă (yellow card) 72' (red card) 72' | Report | Gogoua (yellow card) 19'; Oblyakov (yellow card) 44'; Chalov (penalty missed) 66'; Bistrović 84'; Magnússon (yellow card) 90' (goal) 90+4' | Stadium: Mordovia Arena; Attendance: 17,145; Referee: Mikhail Vilkov |
Note: Match played at the Mordovia Arena in Saransk instead of Tambov's regular Spartak Stadium.

| 22 September 2019 10 | CSKA Moscow | 3–2 | Krasnodar | Moscow |
| 19:00 MSK (UTC+3) | Akhmetov (yellow card) 23'; Vlašić 32' (pen.), 41' (yellow card) 90+5'; Chalov 37' | Report | Skopintsev (yellow card) 40'; Berg 57', 60'; Suleymanov (yellow card) 58'; Martynovich (yellow card) 90+7' | Stadium: VEB Arena; Attendance: 21,026; Referee: Vladislav Bezborodov |

| 29 September 2019 11 | Ural Yekaterinburg | 0–3 | CSKA Moscow | Yekaterinburg |
| 11:30 MSK (UTC+3) | Yemelyanov (yellow card) 75' | Report | Magnússon 17'; Sigurðsson (yellow card) 52' (goal) 57'; Bijol 65'; Chalov (penalty missed) 76' | Stadium: Central Stadium; Attendance: 20,130; Referee: Pavel Kukuyan |

| 6 October 2019 12 | CSKA Moscow | 1–3 | Rostov | Moscow |
| 16:30 MSK (UTC+3) | Fernandes (yellow card) 30'; Vlašić 90+2' | Report | Bayramyan 11', 44'; Glebov (yellow card) 12'; Shomurodov 61'; Saplinov (yellow card) 86' | Stadium: VEB Arena; Attendance: 18,456; Referee: Vasili Kazartsev |

| 20 October 2019 13 | Ufa | 1–1 | CSKA Moscow | Ufa |
| 14:00 MSK (UTC+3) | Terentyev (yellow card) 41'; Fomin (yellow card) 66'; Krotov 83' | Report | Akhmetov 26' | Stadium: Neftyanik Stadium; Attendance: 11,282; Referee: Nikolay Voloshin |

| 27 October 2019 14 | CSKA Moscow | 0–1 | Dynamo Moscow | Moscow |
| 16:30 MSK (UTC+3) | Bijol (yellow card) 9'; Vlašić (penalty missed) 22' | Report | Neustädter (yellow card) 29'; Kaboré (yellow card) 58'; N'Jie 85'; Igboun (yellow card) 88' | Stadium: VEB Arena; Attendance: 20,019; Referee: Sergei Karasev |

| 2 November 2019 15 | Zenit St.Petersburg | 1–1 | CSKA Moscow | Saint Petersburg |
| 19:00 MSK (UTC+3) | Yerokhin 73'; Azmoun (yellow card) 85'; Santos (yellow card) 90+5'; Barrios (yellow card) 90+6' | Report | Vlašić 45+1'; Bijol (yellow card) 51' (yellow-red card) 54'; Karpov (yellow card) 54'; Oblyakov (yellow card) 86'; Fernandes (yellow card) 90+6' | Stadium: Krestovsky Stadium; Attendance: 48,141; Referee: Mikhail Vilkov |

| 10 November 2019 16 | Sochi | 2–3 | CSKA Moscow | Sochi |
| 16:30 MSK (UTC+3) | Mostovoy 7'; Poloz 45+2' (pen.); Dzhanayev (yellow card) 52'; Lagator (yellow card) 59'; Kudryashov (yellow card) 87' | Report | Mevlja 16' (o.g.); Diveyev (yellow card) 18'; Karpov (yellow card) 21'; Oblyakov 52' (yellow card) 74'; Chalov 55'; Bistrović (yellow card) 90+1' | Stadium: Fisht Olympic Stadium; Attendance: 15,318; Referee: Stanislav Vasilyev |

| 24 November 2019 17 | CSKA Moscow | 1–0 | Krylia Sovetov | Moscow |
| 19:00 MSK (UTC+3) | Magnússon (yellow card) 65'; Vlašić 74' | Report | Sobolev (yellow card) 48'; Gațcan (yellow card) 56'; Radonjić (yellow card) 86'; Terekhov (yellow card) 90+2' | Stadium: VEB Arena; Attendance: 11,895; Referee: Vladislav Bezborodov |

| 2 December 2019 18 | CSKA Moscow | 0–1 | Arsenal Tula | Moscow |
| 19:30 MSK (UTC+3) | Diveyev (yellow card) 90+4' | Report | Kombarov (yellow card) 24'; Lesovoy 52' (yellow card) 84' | Stadium: VEB Arena; Attendance: 8,112; Referee: Nikolay Voloshin |

| 7 December 2019 19 | Krasnodar | 1–1 | CSKA Moscow | Krasnodar |
| 16:30 MSK (UTC+3) | Ari (penalty missed) 63' 63'; Vilhena (yellow card) 90+10' | Report | Oblyakov 15' (yellow card) 62'; Vlašić (yellow card) 42'; Dzagoev (yellow card) 57'; Chalov (yellow card) 65'; Nababkin (yellow card) 74'; Diveyev (yellow card) 90+1' | Stadium: Krasnodar Stadium; Attendance: 29,567; Referee: Vasili Kazartsev |

| 29 February 2020 20 | CSKA Moscow | 1–1 | Ural Yekaterinburg | Moscow |
| 14:00 MSK (UTC+3) | Fernandes 90+1' | Report | Palyakow (yellow card) 14'; Bicfalvi (yellow card) 53' (goal) 72' | Stadium: VEB Arena; Attendance: 14,008; Referee: Pavel Kukuyan |

| 9 March 2020 21 | Rostov | 3–2 | CSKA Moscow | Rostov-on-Don |
| 14:00 MSK (UTC+3) | Glebov (yellow card) 17'; Eremenko (penalty missed) 21' 31'; Popov 53' (pen.) (yellow card) 87'; Mamayev 63' (yellow card) 64'; Zaynutdinov (yellow card) 69'; Chernov (yellow card) 77' | Report | Akhmetov (red card) 20'; Sigurðsson 25' (yellow card) 90+7'; Karpov (red card) 51'; Fernandes (yellow card) 52'; Oblyakov (yellow card) 57'; Diveyev (yellow card) 74'; Osipenko 77' (o.g.); Chalov (penalty missed) 86'; Shchennikov (yellow card) 89' | Stadium: Rostov Arena; Attendance: 40,432; Referee: Vladislav Bezborodov |

| 15 March 2020 22 | CSKA Moscow | 0–0 | Ufa | Moscow |
| 16:30 MSK (UTC+3) | Diveyev (yellow card) 38' | Report | Carp (yellow card) 15'; Krotov (yellow card) 30'; Nedelcearu (yellow card) 70' | Stadium: VEB Arena; Referee: Nikolay Voloshin |

| 20 June 2020 23 | CSKA Moscow | 0–4 | Zenit St.Petersburg | Moscow |
| 19:00 MSK (UTC+3) | Diveyev (yellow card) 5'; Oblyakov (yellow card) 10'; Karpov (red card) 89' | Report | Ivanović 2'; Malcom 9', 45+2'; Ozdoyev (yellow card) 50'; Yerokhin (yellow card) 81'; Barrios (yellow card) 88'; Driussi 90+4' | Stadium: VEB Arena; Attendance: 2,904; Referee: Sergey Ivanov |
Note: Match originally scheduled for 22 March, before being postponed on 16 March due to the COVID-19 pandemic. with all league games being postponed on 17 March.

| 27 June 2020 24 | Dynamo Moscow | 0–0 | CSKA Moscow | Moscow |
| 19:00 MSK (UTC+3) | Panchenko (yellow card) 18'; Rykov (yellow card) 24' | Report | Oblyakov (yellow card) 76'; Bijol (yellow card) 80' (yellow-red card) 90+2' | Stadium: VTB Arena; Attendance: 2,432; Referee: Kirill Levnikov |
Note: Match originally scheduled for 5 April, but postponed on 17 March due to the COVID-19 pandemic.

| 30 June 2020 25 | CSKA Moscow | 2–0 | Spartak Moscow | Moscow |
| 20:30 MSK (UTC+3) | Vlašić 27', 90+6'; Chalov (yellow card) 41'; Shchennikov (yellow card) 43'; Nababkin (yellow card) 51'; Bistrović (yellow card) 74'; Fernandes (yellow card) 85' | Report | Maslov (yellow card) 22'; Gigot (yellow card) 37'; Zobnin (red card) 77' | Stadium: VEB Arena; Referee: Aleksey Eskov |
Note: Match originally scheduled for 12 April, but postponed on 1 April due to the COVID-19 pandemic.

| 4 July 2020 26 | Akhmat Grozny | 0–4 | CSKA Moscow | Grozny |
| 20:30 MSK (UTC+3) | | Report | Maradishvili (yellow card) 29'; Chalov 61'; Vlašić 62'; Sigurðsson 65'; Shchennikov (yellow card) 73'; Semyonov (yellow card) 84' | Stadium: Akhmat-Arena; Referee: Pavel Kukuyan |
Note: Match originally scheduled for 18 April, but postponed on 1 April due to the COVID-19 pandemic.

| 8 July 2020 27 | Orenburg | 0–4 | CSKA Moscow | Orenburg |
| 18:00 MSK (UTC+3) | Fameyeh (yellow card) 25'; Kulishev (yellow card) 51'; Krivoruchko (yellow card) 84'; Terekhov (yellow card) 90+1' | Report | Chalov 32'; Diveyev (yellow card) 47'; Nababkin (yellow card) 57'; Vlašić 59'; Shchennikov 78'; Oblyakov 90+4' | Stadium: Gazovik Stadium; Referee: Aleksey Sukhoy |
Note: Match originally scheduled for 26 April, but postponed on 1 April due to the COVID-19 pandemic.

| 12 July 2020 28 | CSKA Moscow | 1–1 | Rubin Kazan | Moscow |
| 18:30 MSK (UTC+3) | Sigurðsson (yellow card) 17'; Maradishvili (yellow card) 24'; Chalov 62'; Oblyakov (yellow card) 69'; Fernandes (yellow card) 81'; Magnússon (yellow card) 90'; Kuchayev (yellow card) 90+6' | Report | Jevtić (yellow card) 21'; Zuyev (yellow card) 68'; Uremović (yellow card) 78'; Markov 88' (pen.); Tarasov (yellow card) 90+2' | Stadium: VEB Arena; Referee: Aleksey Matyunin |
Note: Match originally scheduled for 3 May, but postponed on 1 April due to the COVID-19 pandemic.

| 16 July 2020 29 | Lokomotiv Moscow | 2–1 | CSKA Moscow | Moscow |
| 20:30 MSK (UTC+3) | Magkeyev (yellow card) 21'; Al.Miranchuk 33' (pen.), 90+2' (pen.); Ćorluka (yellow card) 38'; Farfán (yellow card) 75'; Ignatyev (yellow card) 89' | Report | Akinfeev (yellow card) 33'; Vlašić 71'; Nababkin (yellow card) 90+1'; Magnússon (yellow card) 90+5' | Stadium: RZD Arena; Referee: Evgeny Turbin |
Note: Match originally scheduled for 11 May, but postponed on 1 April due to the COVID-19 pandemic.

| 22 July 2020 30 | CSKA Moscow | 2–0 | Tambov | Moscow |
| 19:00 MSK (UTC+3) | Shchennikov 26'; Diveyev (yellow card) 40'; Dzagoev (yellow card) 55'; Oblyakov 78' | Report | Filin (yellow card) 23'; Melkadze (yellow card) 39' (yellow-red card) 45+1'; Kilin (yellow card) 88' | Stadium: VEB Arena; Referee: Kirill Levnikov |
Note: Match originally scheduled for 17 May, but postponed on 1 April due to the COVID-19 pandemic.

==== League table ====
| Pos | Team | Pld | W | D | L | GF | GA | GD | Pts | Qualification or relegation |
|---|---|---|---|---|---|---|---|---|---|---|
| 2 | Lokomotiv Moscow | 30 | 16 | 9 | 5 | 41 | 29 | +12 | 57 | Qualification for the Champions League group stage |
| 3 | Krasnodar | 30 | 14 | 10 | 6 | 49 | 30 | +19 | 52 | Qualification for the Champions League play-off round |
| 4 | CSKA Moscow | 30 | 14 | 8 | 8 | 43 | 29 | +14 | 50 | Qualification for the Europa League group stage |
| 5 | Rostov | 30 | 12 | 9 | 9 | 45 | 50 | −5 | 45 | Qualification for the Europa League third qualifying round |
| 6 | Dynamo Moscow | 30 | 11 | 8 | 11 | 27 | 30 | −3 | 41 | Qualification for the Europa League second qualifying round |

Source: Russian Premier Liga, Soccerway
Rules for classification: 1) Points; 2) Head-to-head points; 3) Head-to-head matches won; 4) Head-to-head goal difference; 5) Head-to-head goals scored; 6) Matches won; 7) Goal difference; 8) Goals scored; 9) Play-off.

=== Russian Cup ===
| 25 September 2019 Round of 32 | Alania Vladikavkaz | 1–3 | CSKA Moscow | Vladikavkaz |
| 18:00 MSK (UTC+3) | Khadartsev 19' (pen.); Kachmazov (yellow card) 22'; Tsarikayev (yellow card) 37'; Mashukov (yellow card) 40'; Kokoyev (yellow card) 73'; Zaseyev (yellow card) 80' | Report | Akhmetov 2' (pen.); Nishimura 34', 72'; Chalov (yellow card) 84' | Stadium: Republican Spartak Stadium; Attendance: 18,000; Referee: Igor Panin |

| 30 October 2019 Round of 16 | CSKA Moscow | 1–0 | Ufa | Moscow |
| 19:00 MSK (UTC+3) | Bijol 90+2' | Report | Nedelcearu (yellow card) 61'; Alikin (yellow card) 67' | Stadium: VEB Arena; Referee: Sergey Ivanov |

| 4 March 2020 Quarterfinal | Spartak Moscow | 3–2 (a.e.t.) | CSKA Moscow | Moscow |
| 19:30 MSK (UTC+3) | Bakayev 4'; Ponce 14' (yellow card) 68' (yellow-red card) 103'; Kutepov (yellow card) 34'; Rebrov (yellow card) 105'; Larsson 107'; Zobnin (yellow card) 109' | Report | Diveyev 17'; Akhmetov 45+1'; Fernandes (yellow card) 45+3'; Oblyakov (yellow card) 80'; Karpov (yellow card) 97'; Nababkin (yellow card) 115' | Stadium: Otkrytiye Arena; Referee: Sergey Ivanov |

=== UEFA Europa League ===
==== Group stage ====
| Pos | Team | Pld | W | D | L | GF | GA | GD | Pts | Qualification |
|---|---|---|---|---|---|---|---|---|---|---|
| 1 | (Spain) Espanyol | 6 | 3 | 2 | 1 | 12 | 4 | +8 | 11 | Advance to knockout phase |
| 2 | (Bulgaria) Ludogorets Razgrad | 6 | 2 | 2 | 2 | 10 | 10 | 0 | 8 | Advance to knockout phase |
| 3 | (Hungary) Ferencváros | 6 | 1 | 4 | 1 | 5 | 7 | −2 | 7 | |
| 4 | (Russia) CSKA Moscow | 6 | 1 | 2 | 3 | 3 | 9 | −6 | 5 | |

Source: UEFA
Rules for classification: Group stage tiebreakers

| 19 September 2019 1 | Ludogorets Razgrad (Bulgaria) | 5–1 | (Russia) CSKA Moscow | Razgrad, Bulgaria |
| 22:00 MSK (UTC+3) | Wanderson 48'; Lukoki 50'; Keșerü 52', 68', 73' (pen.); Cicinho (yellow card) 85' | Report | Diveyev 11'; Karpov (yellow card) 61'; Akinfeev (yellow card) 72' | Stadium: Ludogorets Arena; Attendance: 8,423; Referee: Irfan Peljto (Bosnia and Herzegovina) |

| 3 October 2019 2 | CSKA Moscow (Russia) | 0–2 | (Spain) Espanyol | Moscow, Russia |
| 19:55 MSK (UTC+3) | Fernandes (yellow card) 37'; Oblyakov (yellow card) 87'; Bijol (yellow card) 90+2' | Report | Piatti (yellow card) 31'; Wu 64' (yellow card) 70'; Granero (yellow card) 67'; Campuzano 90+5' | Stadium: VEB Arena; Attendance: 22,288; Referee: Ali Palabıyık (Turkey) |

| 24 October 2019 3 | CSKA Moscow (Russia) | 0–1 | (Hungary) Ferencváros | Moscow, Russia |
| 19:55 MSK (UTC+3) | Bistrović (yellow card) 77'; Magnússon (yellow card) 90+2' | Report | Sigér (yellow card) 74'; Varga 86'; Kharatin (yellow card) 90+2' | Stadium: VEB Arena; Attendance: 18,518; Referee: Pavel Orel (Czech Republic) |

| 7 November 2019 4 | Ferencváros (Hungary) | 0–0 | (Russia) CSKA Moscow | Budapest, Hungary |
| 22:00 MSK (UTC+3) | Ihnatenko (yellow card) 18'; Škvarka (yellow card) 20'; Kharatin (yellow card) 25'; Botka (yellow card) 74'; Frimpong (yellow card) 90+1' | Report | Bijol (yellow card) 18'; Vlašić (yellow card) 28'; Nababkin (yellow card) 85' (yellow-red card) 90+1' | Stadium: Groupama Arena; Attendance: 18,153; Referee: Aleksandar Stavrev (North Macedonia) |

| 28 November 2019 5 | CSKA Moscow (Russia) | 1–1 | (Bulgaria) Ludogorets Razgrad | Moscow, Russia |
| 20:55 MSK (UTC+3) | Chalov (yellow card) 60' (goal) 76' | Report | Keșerü (yellow card) 35' (goal) 66'; Anicet (yellow card) 81' | Stadium: VEB Arena; Attendance: 12,948; Referee: Jakob Kehlet (Denmark) |

| 12 December 2019 6 | Espanyol (Spain) | 0–1 | (Russia) CSKA Moscow | Cornellà de Llobregat, Spain |
| 22:00 MSK (UTC+3) | | Report | Oblyakov (yellow card) 71'; Magnússon (yellow card) 72'; Karpov (yellow card) 76'; Diveyev (yellow card) 77'; Vlašić 84' | Stadium: RCDE Stadium; Attendance: 10,615; Referee: Kevin Blom (Netherlands) |

== Squad statistics ==
As of match played 22 July 2020

=== Appearances and goals ===
| No. | Pos | Nat | Player | Total | | Premier League | | Russian Cup | | Europa League | |
| No. | Pos | Nat | Player | Apps | Goals | Apps | Goals | Apps | Goals | Apps | Goals |
|---|---|---|---|---|---|---|---|---|---|---|---|
| 1 | GK | (Russia) RUS | Ilya Pomazun | 3 | 0 | 0 | 0 | 2 | 0 | 1 | 0 |
| 2 | DF | (Russia) RUS | Mário Fernandes | 36 | 3 | 29 | 3 | 1 | 0 | 6 | 0 |
| 5 | DF | (Russia) RUS | Viktor Vasin | 12 | 0 | 9+2 | 0 | 1 | 0 | 0 | 0 |
| 7 | MF | (Russia) RUS | Ilzat Akhmetov | 30 | 4 | 17+4 | 2 | 3 | 2 | 4+2 | 0 |
| 8 | MF | (Croatia) CRO | Nikola Vlašić | 38 | 13 | 30 | 12 | 1+1 | 0 | 6 | 1 |
| 9 | FW | (Russia) RUS | Fyodor Chalov | 39 | 9 | 29+1 | 8 | 1+2 | 0 | 5+1 | 1 |
| 10 | MF | (Russia) RUS | Alan Dzagoev | 12 | 0 | 6+4 | 0 | 0+1 | 0 | 0+1 | 0 |
| 14 | DF | (Russia) RUS | Kirill Nababkin | 16 | 0 | 9+4 | 0 | 2 | 0 | 0+1 | 0 |
| 15 | MF | (Russia) RUS | Dmitry Yefremov | 2 | 0 | 1+1 | 0 | 0 | 0 | 0 | 0 |
| 17 | MF | (Iceland) ISL | Arnór Sigurðsson | 29 | 4 | 19+3 | 4 | 2 | 0 | 4+1 | 0 |
| 20 | MF | (Russia) RUS | Konstantin Kuchayev | 34 | 0 | 14+11 | 0 | 2+1 | 0 | 5+1 | 0 |
| 23 | DF | (Iceland) ISL | Hörður Magnússon | 34 | 2 | 26+1 | 2 | 1 | 0 | 6 | 0 |
| 25 | MF | (Croatia) CRO | Kristijan Bistrović | 36 | 1 | 15+13 | 1 | 2 | 0 | 4+2 | 0 |
| 27 | DF | (Ivory Coast) CIV | Cédric Gogoua | 5 | 1 | 3+1 | 1 | 0 | 0 | 0+1 | 0 |
| 29 | MF | (Slovenia) SLO | Jaka Bijol | 34 | 2 | 4+21 | 1 | 1+2 | 1 | 2+4 | 0 |
| 35 | GK | (Russia) RUS | Igor Akinfeev | 36 | 0 | 30 | 0 | 1 | 0 | 5 | 0 |
| 42 | DF | (Russia) RUS | Georgi Shchennikov | 11 | 2 | 9 | 2 | 1 | 0 | 0+1 | 0 |
| 53 | DF | (Russia) RUS | Maksim Yeleyev | 1 | 0 | 0 | 0 | 1 | 0 | 0 | 0 |
| 62 | DF | (Russia) RUS | Vadim Karpov | 19 | 0 | 12+1 | 0 | 1 | 0 | 5 | 0 |
| 71 | MF | (Russia) RUS | Nayair Tiknizyan | 6 | 0 | 0+5 | 0 | 1 | 0 | 0 | 0 |
| 78 | DF | (Russia) RUS | Igor Diveyev | 35 | 2 | 26 | 0 | 3 | 1 | 6 | 1 |
| 87 | MF | (Russia) RUS | Konstantin Maradishvili | 11 | 0 | 7+4 | 0 | 0 | 0 | 0 | 0 |
| 98 | MF | (Russia) RUS | Ivan Oblyakov | 37 | 4 | 28 | 4 | 2+1 | 0 | 5+1 | 0 |
| 99 | FW | (Belarus) BLR | Ilya Shkurin | 5 | 0 | 0+4 | 0 | 0+1 | 0 | 0 | 0 |
Players away from the club on loan:
| 19 | FW | (Japan) JPN | Takuma Nishimura | 8 | 2 | 1+4 | 0 | 2 | 2 | 1 | 0 |
Players who left CSKA Moscow during the season:
| 11 | MF | (Brazil) BRA | Lucas Santos | 5 | 0 | 0+2 | 0 | 0+1 | 0 | 0+2 | 0 |
| 31 | DF | (Croatia) CRO | Zvonimir Šarlija | 14 | 0 | 6+5 | 0 | 2 | 0 | 1 | 0 |

=== Goal scorers ===
| Place | Position | Nation | Number | Name | Premier League | Russian Cup | Europa League | Total |
|---|---|---|---|---|---|---|---|---|
| 1 | MF | (Croatia) | 8 | Nikola Vlašić | 12 | 0 | 1 | 13 |
| 2 | FW | (Russia) | 9 | Fyodor Chalov | 8 | 0 | 1 | 9 |
| 3 | MF | (Russia) | 7 | Ilzat Akhmetov | 2 | 2 | 0 | 4 |
| 4 | MF | (Iceland) | 17 | Arnór Sigurðsson | 4 | 0 | 0 | 4 |
| 4 | MF | (Russia) | 98 | Ivan Oblyakov | 4 | 0 | 0 | 4 |
| 5 | DF | (Russia) | 2 | Mário Fernandes | 3 | 0 | 0 | 3 |
| 5 | | | | Own goal | 3 | 0 | 0 | 3 |
| 8 | DF | (Iceland) | 23 | Hörður Magnússon | 2 | 0 | 0 | 2 |
| 8 | DF | (Russia) | 42 | Georgi Shchennikov | 2 | 0 | 0 | 2 |
| 8 | MF | (Slovenia) | 29 | Jaka Bijol | 1 | 1 | 0 | 2 |
| 8 | FW | (Japan) | 19 | Takuma Nishimura | 0 | 2 | 0 | 2 |
| 8 | DF | (Russia) | 78 | Igor Diveyev | 0 | 1 | 1 | 2 |
| 13 | DF | (Ivory Coast) | 27 | Cédric Gogoua | 1 | 0 | 0 | 1 |
| 13 | MF | (Croatia) | 25 | Kristijan Bistrović | 1 | 0 | 0 | 1 |
| | | | | TOTALS | 43 | 6 | 3 | 52 |

=== Clean sheets ===
| Place | Position | Nation | Number | Name | Premier League | Russian Cup | Europa League | Total |
|---|---|---|---|---|---|---|---|---|
| 1 | GK | (Russia) | 35 | Igor Akinfeev | 13 | 0 | 1 | 14 |
| 2 | GK | (Russia) | 1 | Ilya Pomazun | 0 | 1 | 1 | 2 |
| | | | | TOTALS | 13 | 1 | 2 | 16 |

=== Disciplinary record ===
| Number | Nation | Position | Name | Premier League | | Russian Cup | | Europa League | | Total | |
| Number | Nation | Position | Name | Yellow card | Red card | Yellow card | Red card | Yellow card | Red card | Yellow card | Red card |
| 2 | (Russia) | DF | Mário Fernandes | 5 | 0 | 1 | 0 | 1 | 0 | 7 | 0 |
| 5 | (Russia) | DF | Viktor Vasin | 1 | 0 | 0 | 0 | 0 | 0 | 1 | 0 |
| 7 | (Russia) | MF | Ilzat Akhmetov | 2 | 1 | 0 | 0 | 0 | 0 | 2 | 1 |
| 8 | (Croatia) | MF | Nikola Vlašić | 2 | 0 | 0 | 0 | 1 | 0 | 3 | 0 |
| 9 | (Russia) | FW | Fyodor Chalov | 3 | 0 | 1 | 0 | 1 | 0 | 5 | 0 |
| 10 | (Russia) | MF | Alan Dzagoev | 2 | 0 | 0 | 0 | 0 | 0 | 2 | 0 |
| 14 | (Russia) | DF | Kirill Nababkin | 5 | 0 | 1 | 0 | 2 | 1 | 8 | 1 |
| 17 | (Iceland) | MF | Arnór Sigurðsson | 4 | 0 | 0 | 0 | 0 | 0 | 4 | 0 |
| 20 | (Russia) | MF | Konstantin Kuchayev | 2 | 0 | 0 | 0 | 0 | 0 | 2 | 0 |
| 23 | (Iceland) | DF | Hörður Magnússon | 7 | 0 | 0 | 0 | 2 | 0 | 9 | 0 |
| 25 | (Croatia) | MF | Kristijan Bistrović | 4 | 0 | 0 | 0 | 1 | 0 | 5 | 0 |
| 27 | (Ivory Coast) | DF | Cédric Gogoua | 1 | 0 | 0 | 0 | 0 | 0 | 1 | 0 |
| 29 | (Slovenia) | MF | Jaka Bijol | 5 | 2 | 0 | 0 | 2 | 0 | 7 | 2 |
| 35 | (Russia) | GK | Igor Akinfeev | 2 | 0 | 0 | 0 | 1 | 0 | 3 | 0 |
| 42 | (Russia) | DF | Georgi Shchennikov | 3 | 0 | 0 | 0 | 0 | 0 | 3 | 0 |
| 62 | (Russia) | DF | Vadim Karpov | 2 | 2 | 1 | 0 | 2 | 0 | 5 | 2 |
| 78 | (Russia) | DF | Igor Diveyev | 9 | 0 | 0 | 0 | 1 | 0 | 10 | 0 |
| 87 | (Russia) | MF | Konstantin Maradishvili | 2 | 0 | 0 | 0 | 0 | 0 | 2 | 0 |
| 98 | (Russia) | MF | Ivan Oblyakov | 11 | 0 | 1 | 0 | 2 | 0 | 14 | 0 |
Players who left CSKA Moscow during the season:
| 31 | (Croatia) | DF | Zvonimir Šarlija | 3 | 0 | 0 | 0 | 0 | 0 | 3 | 0 |
| | | | TOTALS | 75 | 5 | 5 | 0 | 16 | 1 | 96 | 6 |
