= 2017–18 PFC CSKA Moscow season =

CSKA
2017–18 season
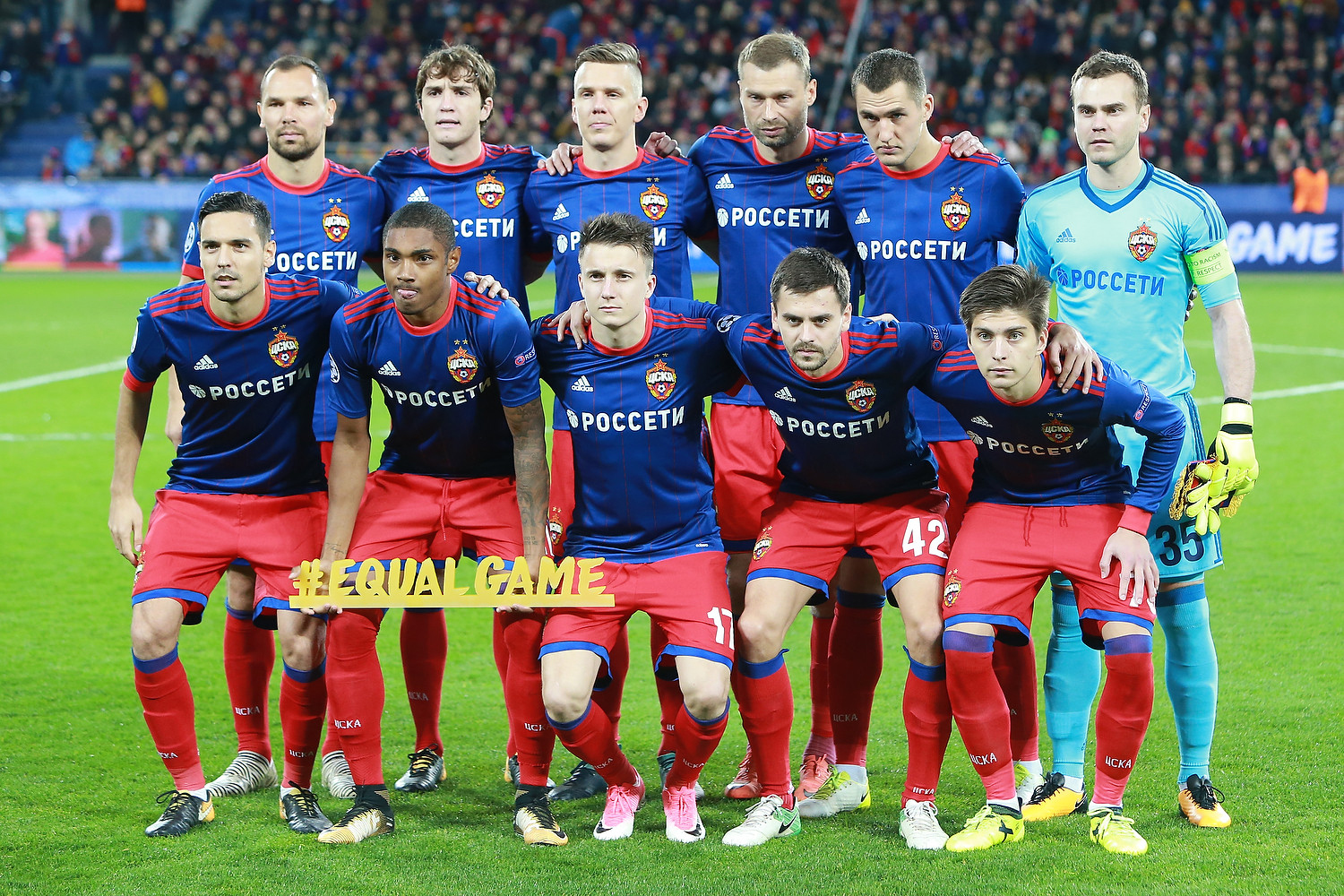
- Chairman: Yevgeni Giner
- Manager: Viktor Goncharenko
- Stadium: VEB Arena
- Premier League: 2nd
- Russian Cup: Round of 32
- Champions League: Group stage
- Europa League: Quarter-finals
- Top goalscorer: League: Vitinho (10); All: Vitinho (12)
- Highest home attendance: 29,284 vs Arsenal (12 April 2018)
- Lowest home attendance: 8,016 vs Amkar Perm (18 April 2018)
- Average home league attendance: 17,798 (13 May 2018)
Home colours	Away colours	Third colours

The 2017–18 CSKA season was the 26th successive season that the club played in the Russian Premier League, the highest tier of association football in Russia. CSKA finished the previous season in 2nd, and as a result entered the Champions League at the Third Qualifying stage, and also took part in the Russian Cup.

== Squad ==
As of match played 12 May 2018

Number	Name	Nationality	Position	Date of birth (age)	Signed from	Signed in	Contract ends	Apps.	Goals
Goalkeepers
1	Ilya Pomazun	(Russia)	GK	16 August 1996 (aged 21)	Academy	2012		3	0
35	Igor Akinfeev	(Russia)	GK	8 April 1986 (aged 32)	Academy	2003	2019	565	0
Defenders
2	Mário Fernandes	(Russia)	DF	19 September 1990 (aged 27)	Grêmio	2012	2022	201	2
4	Sergei Ignashevich	(Russia)	DF	14 July 1979 (aged 38)	Lokomotiv Moscow	2004		541	46
5	Viktor Vasin	(Russia)	DF	6 October 1988 (aged 29)	Spartak Nalchik	2011		57	2
6	Aleksei Berezutski	(Russia)	DF	20 June 1982 (aged 35)	Chernomorets Novorossiysk	2001		502	11
14	Kirill Nababkin	(Russia)	DF	8 September 1986 (aged 31)	Moscow	2010		200	4
24	Vasili Berezutski	(Russia)	DF	20 June 1982 (aged 35)	Torpedo-ZIL	2002		531	14
42	Georgi Shchennikov	(Russia)	DF	27 April 1991 (aged 27)	Academy	2008		282	6
62	Aleksandar Stanisavljević	(Serbia)	DF	27 January 1998 (aged 20)	Academy	2015		0	0
Midfielders
3	Pontus Wernbloom	(Sweden)	MF	25 June 1986 (aged 31)	AZ Alkmaar	2012	2018	224	22
8	Georgi Milanov	(Bulgaria)	MF	19 February 1992 (aged 26)	Litex Lovech	2013	2018	147	6
10	Alan Dzagoev	(Russia)	MF	17 June 1990 (aged 27)	Krylia Sovetov-SOK Dimitrovgrad	2008	2019	331	75
17	Aleksandr Golovin	(Russia)	MF	30 May 1996 (aged 21)	Academy	2012	2021	113	13
25	Kristijan Bistrović	(Croatia)	MF	9 April 1998 (aged 20)	Slaven Belupo	2018	2022	9	0
66	Bibras Natkho	(Israel)	MF	18 February 1988 (aged 30)	PAOK	2014	2018	142	28
71	Nayair Tiknizyan	(Russia)	MF	12 May 1999 (aged 19)	Academy	2013		1	0
72	Astemir Gordyushenko	(Russia)	MF	30 March 1997 (aged 21)	Academy	2014	2020	16	0
80	Khetag Khosonov	(Russia)	MF	18 June 1998 (aged 19)	Academy	2014		9	0
82	Ivan Oleynikov	(Russia)	MF	24 August 1998 (aged 19)	Academy	2015		1	0
89	Konstantin Kuchayev	(Russia)	MF	18 March 1998 (aged 20)	Academy	2015		36	1
Forwards
7	Ahmed Musa	(Nigeria)	FW	13 August 1989 (aged 28)	loan from Leicester City	2018	2018	180	61
11	Vitinho	(Brazil)	FW	9 October 1993 (aged 24)	Botafogo	2013	2020	83	18
63	Fyodor Chalov	(Russia)	FW	10 April 1998 (aged 20)	Academy	2015	2020	49	13
75	Timur Zhamaletdinov	(Russia)	FW	21 May 1997 (aged 20)	Academy	2014		26	2
85	Danila Yanov	(Russia)	FW	27 January 2000 (aged 18)	Strogino Moscow	2018		0	0
Away on loan
9	Konstantin Bazelyuk	(Russia)	FW	12 April 1993 (aged 25)	Academy	2010		27	4
43	Aleksandr Makarov	(Russia)	MF	24 April 1996 (aged 22)	Academy	2013		2	0
91	Nikita Chernov	(Russia)	DF	14 January 1996 (aged 22)	Academy	2013		3	0
99	Aaron Olanare	(Nigeria)	FW	4 June 1994 (aged 23)	Guangzhou R&F	2017	2021	28	4
	Sergei Tkachyov	(Russia)	MF	19 May 1989 (aged 28)	Kuban Krasnodar	2016	2019	11	0
	Dmitry Yefremov	(Russia)	MF	1 April 1995 (aged 23)	Akademiya Tolyatti	2013		33	0

=== Out on loan ===
Note: Flags indicate national team as defined under FIFA eligibility rules; some limited exceptions apply. Players may hold more than one non-FIFA nationality.

No.	Pos.	Nation	Player
—	DF	RUS	Nikita Chernov (at Ural Yekaterinburg)
—	MF	RUS	Aleksandr Makarov (at Tosno)
—	MF	RUS	Sergei Tkachyov (at Arsenal Tula)

No.	Pos.	Nation	Player
—	MF	RUS	Dmitri Yefremov (at Orenburg)
—	FW	RUS	Konstantin Bazelyuk (at Zbrojovka Brno)
—	FW	NGR	Aaron Olanare (at Amkar Perm)

== Transfers ==
=== In ===
Date	Position	Nationality	Name	From	Fee	Ref.
31 August 2017	GK	(Russia)	Nikolay Zirikov	Youth Team	Promoted	
13 October 2017	DF	(Russia)	Ivan Zakharov	Youth Team	Promoted	
13 October 2017	FW	(Russia)	Roman Pukhov	Youth Team	Promoted	
1 January 2018	FW	(Russia)	Danila Yanov	Strogino Moscow	Undisclosed	
12 January 2018	MF	(Croatia)	Kristijan Bistrović	Slaven Koprivnica	Undisclosed	

=== Out ===
Date	Position	Nationality	Name	To	Fee	Ref.
1 July 2017	MF	(Russia)	Sergei Tkachyov	Arsenal Tula	Undisclosed	
1 July 2017	MF	(Russia)	Vladimir Kabakhidze	Arsenal Tula	Undisclosed	
1 July 2017	FW	(Russia)	Artyom Avanesyan	Zenit Penza	Undisclosed	
5 July 2017	MF	(Russia)	Dmitri Yefremov	Orenburg	Undisclosed	
31 August 2017	DF	(Russia)	Mutalip Alibekov	Khimki	Undisclosed	
9 February 2018	FW	(Sweden)	Alibek Aliev	Örgryte	Undisclosed	
16 February 2017	FW	(Russia)	Roman Pukhov	Dynamo Moscow	Undisclosed	

=== Loans in ===
Date from	Position	Nationality	Name	From	Date to	Ref.
30 January 2018	FW	(Nigeria)	Ahmed Musa	Leicester City	End of season	

=== Loans out ===
Date from	Position	Nationality	Name	To	Date to	Ref.
20 June 2017	FW	(Russia)	Konstantin Bazelyuk	Anzhi Makhachkala	11 January 2018	
4 August 2017	DF	(Russia)	Nikita Chernov	Ural Yekaterinburg	Season-long	
11 January 2018	FW	(Russia)	Konstantin Bazelyuk	Zbrojovka Brno	End of Season	
9 February 2018	MF	(Russia)	Aleksandr Makarov	Tosno	End of Season	
7 February 2018	DF	(Russia)	Saveliy Kozlov	Tyumen	End of Season	
22 February 2018	FW	(Nigeria)	Aaron Olanare	Amkar Perm	End of Season	

=== Released ===
Date	Position	Nationality	Name	Joined	Date
1 July 2017	MF	(Finland)	Roman Eremenko	Spartak Moscow	10 August 2018
5 July 2017	MF	(Serbia)	Zoran Tošić	Partizan	28 August 2017
15 December 2017	DF	(Russia)	Danil Neplyuyev	Metallurg Lipetsk	
13 May 2018	MF	(Sweden)	Pontus Wernbloom	PAOK	17 August 2018
14 May 2018	MF	(Bulgaria)	Georgi Milanov	MOL Vidi	3 September 2018
29 May 2018	MF	(Russia)	Kirill Leonov	Zorky Krasnogorsk	28 August 2018
29 May 2018	DF	(Serbia)	Aleksandar Stanisavljević	Slavia Sofia	8 June 2018
29 May 2018	DF	(Russia)	Aleksandr Volkov		
2 June 2018	MF	(Israel)	Bibras Natkho	Olympiacos	6 August 2018

† Wernbloom, Milanov and Natkho's contract expiry was announced on the above date, and came into play on 30 June.

=== Trial ===
Date From	Date To	Position	Nationality	Name	Last club	Ref.
6 June 2017		GK	(Russia)	Anton Antipov	Spartak Nalchik	
		DF	(France)	Cécé Pepe	Olympique de Marseille	

== Friendlies ==
24 June 2017	CSKA Moscow (Russia)	1–2	(Austria) Sturm Graz	Austria
19:00 MSK (UTC+3)	Chalov 14'	Report	Zulechner 35'; Huspek 71'

1 July 2017	CSKA Moscow (Russia)	3–0	(Serbia) Partizan	Austria
18:00 MSK (UTC+3)	Kuchayev 17'; Vitinho 31'; Chalov 86'	Report

5 July 2017	CSKA Moscow (Russia)	4–2	(Romania) Viitorul Constanța	Austria
18:00 MSK (UTC+3)	Vitinho 43', 82'; Natkho 78'; Golovin 79'	Report	Chițu 14'; Țîru 54'

8 July 2017	CSKA Moscow (Russia)	4–1	(Slovenia) Nafta Lendava	Bad Tatzmannsdorf, Austria
17:00 MSK (UTC+3)	Zhamaletdinov 4'; Olanare 13'; Monyak 19' (o.g.); Alibekov 23'	Report	Maleshevich 86'

9 July 2017	CSKA Moscow (Russia)	1–1	(Russia) Krasnodar
13:00 MSK (UTC+3)	Dzagoev 12'	Report	Wanderson 89'

21 January 2018	CSKA Moscow (Russia)	0–0	(Norway) Vålerenga	Alicante, Spain
18:00 MSK (UTC+3)		Report

22 January 2018	CSKA Moscow (Russia)	2–2	(Denmark) Horsens	Alicante, Spain
14:00 MSK (UTC+3)	Vitinho 11', 55'	Report	Qvist 4'; Finnbogason 35'

29 January 2018	CSKA Moscow (Russia)	0–0	(Poland) Piast Gliwice	Alicante, Spain
18:00 MSK (UTC+3)	Wernbloom (yellow card) 54'; Golovin (yellow card) 55'	Report

2 February 2018	CSKA Moscow (Russia)	1–1	(Denmark) Nordsjælland	Alicante, Spain
18:00 MSK (UTC+3)	Natkho (yellow card) 22'; Musa 33'	Report	M.Jensen 43' (yellow card) 70'

6 February 2018	CSKA Moscow (Russia)	3–0	(Spain) Elche	Alicante, Spain
20:00 MSK (UTC+3)	Musa 22', 61'; Vitinho 40'	Report

7 February 2018	CSKA Moscow (Russia)	7–0	(Spain) Torrevieja	Alicante, Spain
14:00 MSK (UTC+3)	Olanare 12', 47', 55'; Chalov 64', 78', 88'; V.Zhironkin 86'	Report

17 February 2018	CSKA Moscow (Russia)	0–0	(Denmark) Esbjerg	Alicante, Spain
17:00 MSK (UTC+3)		Report

25 March 2018	CSKA Moscow	4–0	Ryazan	Moscow
13:00 MSK (UTC+3)	Vitinho 17' (pen.); Zhamaletdinov 52'; Nababkin (yellow card) 58'; Chalov 79', 84'; Khosonov (yellow card) 85'	Report

== Competitions ==
=== Russian Premier League ===
==== Results by round ====
Round	1	2	3	4	5	6	7	8	9	10	11	12	13	14	15	16	17	18	19	20	21	22	23	24	25	26	27	28	29	30
Ground	A	H	H	H	A	H	A	H	A	H	A	H	A	H	A	A	A	A	H	A	H	A	A	H	A	H	H	A	H	H
Result	W	L	W	L	W	W	D	L	W	W	D	D	W	D	L	D	W	W	W	L	W	W	W	L	D	W	W	D	W	W
Position	1	7	5	8	5	4	4	6	4	4	4	4	3	3	3	4	3	3	3	5	5	3	3	4	4	3	2	3	3	2

Updated to match(es) played on 13 May 2018. Source: See Results
A = Away; H = Home; W = Win; D = Draw; L = Loss

==== Matches ====
15 July 2017 1	Anzhi Makhachkala	1–3	CSKA Moscow	Kaspiysk
20:00 MSK (UTC+3)	Yakovlev (yellow card) 41'; Markelov 64'; Poluyakhtov (yellow card) 74'; Danchenko (yellow card) 90+1'	Report	Vasin 21'; Golovin 49' (yellow card) 90+3'; Natkho 79' (pen.)	Stadium: Anzhi Arena; Attendance: 9,400; Referee: Vladimir Seldyakov

22 July 2017 2	CSKA Moscow	1–3	Lokomotiv Moscow	Moscow
15:00 MSK (UTC+3)	Vitinho 42'; Golovin (yellow card) 83'	Report	Farfán 23' (yellow card) 58'; Kvirkvelia (yellow card) 47'; Tarasov (yellow card) 54' (goal) 74'; Ari 66'; Denisov (yellow card) 85'; An.Miranchuk (yellow card) 90+4'	Stadium: VEB Arena; Attendance: 14,500; Referee: Sergei Karasev

29 July 2017 3	CSKA Moscow	2–0	SKA-Khabarovsk	Moscow
15:00 MSK (UTC+3)	Golovin 4'; Natkho 37' (pen.)	Report	Ediyev (yellow card) 36'; Balyaikin (yellow card) 43'	Stadium: VEB Arena; Attendance: 8,500; Referee: Kirill Levnikov

6 August 2017 4	CSKA Moscow	1–2	Rubin Kazan	Moscow
17:30 MSK (UTC+3)	Shchennikov 13'; Wernbloom (yellow card) 26'; Vitinho (yellow card) 32'	Report	Jonathas 2', 10'; Granat (yellow card) 23'; M'Vila (yellow card) 56'; Ryzhikov (yellow card) 90+3'	Stadium: VEB Arena; Attendance: 11,165; Referee: Vladislav Bezborodov

9 August 2017 5	Tosno	1–2	CSKA Moscow	Saint Petersburg
20:00 MSK (UTC+3)	Zabolotny 56'	Report	Olanare 49'; Dzagoev 62'; Vasin (yellow card) 86'	Stadium: Petrovsky Stadium; Attendance: 6,350; Referee: Vladimir Moskalyov

12 August 2017 6	CSKA Moscow	2–1	Spartak Moscow	Moscow
17:30 MSK (UTC+3)	Shchennikov 83'; Vitinho 84' (yellow card) 85'; Golovin 84'; Fernandes (yellow card) 90+6'; Wernbloom (yellow card) 90+6'	Report	Pašalić 48'; Dzhikiya (yellow card) 90+5'; Promes (yellow card) 90+5'	Stadium: VEB Arena; Attendance: 24,000; Referee: Vladimir Seldyakov

19 August 2017 7	Ural Yekaterinburg	0–0	CSKA Moscow	Yekaterinburg
15:00 MSK (UTC+3)	Yevseyev (yellow card) 89'	Report	Dzagoev (yellow card) 44'; Nababkin (yellow card) 64'	Stadium: SKB-Bank Arena; Attendance: 8,964; Referee: Sergey Lapochkin

27 August 2017 8	CSKA Moscow	0–1	Akhmat Grozny	Moscow
17:30 MSK (UTC+3)		Report	Sadayev 45'; Ángel (yellow card) 53'; Gorodov (yellow card) 65'; Utsiyev (yellow card) 78'	Stadium: VEB Arena; Attendance: 16,400; Referee: Mikhail Vilkov

8 September 2017 9	Amkar Perm	0–1	CSKA Moscow	Perm
17:30 MSK (UTC+3)	Gol (yellow card) 13'; Belorukov (yellow card) 45+1'; Zanev (yellow card) 55'; Idowu (yellow card) 84' (yellow-red card) 90'	Report	Zhamaletdinov 52'; Wernbloom (yellow card) 77'; Kuchayev (yellow card) 84'	Stadium: Zvezda Stadium; Attendance: 7,680; Referee: Sergey Ivanov

16 September 2017 10	CSKA Moscow	2–0	Rostov	Moscow
15:30 MSK (UTC+3)	Berezutski 30'; Golovin (yellow card) 56'; Vitinho 68'	Report	Yusupov (yellow card) 39'; Gațcan (yellow card) 57'	Stadium: VEB Arena; Attendance: 15,144; Referee: Vladimir Moskalyov

23 September 2017 11	Dynamo Moscow	0–0	CSKA Moscow	Khimki
16:30 MSK (UTC+3)		Report	Vitinho (yellow card) 83'	Stadium: Arena Khimki; Attendance: 10,427; Referee: Aleksei Nikolaev

1 October 2017 12	CSKA Moscow	0–0	Ufa	Moscow
14:00 MSK (UTC+3)		Report		Stadium: VEB Arena; Attendance: 10,127; Referee: Sergey Lapochkin

14 October 2017 13	Krasnodar	0–1	CSKA Moscow	Krasnodar
19:00 MSK (UTC+3)	Gazinsky (yellow card) 75'; Smolov (yellow card) 85'	Report	A.Berezutski 38'; Natkho (yellow card) 54'	Stadium: Krasnodar Stadium; Attendance: 32,579; Referee: Vitali Meshkov

22 October 2017 14	CSKA Moscow	0–0	Zenit St.Petersburg	Moscow
16:30 MSK (UTC+3)	Vasin (yellow card) 5'; Akinfeev (yellow card) 11'; Fernandes (yellow card) 12'; A. Berezutski (yellow card) 30'; Wernbloom (yellow card) 65'; Natkho (yellow card) 66'	Report	Mevlja (yellow card) 32'; Rigoni (yellow card) 43'; Dzyuba (yellow card) 66'; Paredes (yellow card) 66'	Stadium: VEB Arena; Attendance: 26,137; Referee: Mikhail Vilkov

27 October 2017 15	Arsenal Tula	1–0	CSKA Moscow	Tula
19:30 MSK (UTC+3)	Causic 80'; Grigalava (yellow card) 85'	Report	Kuchayev (yellow card) 23' (yellow-red card) 54'; Natkho (yellow card) 90+1'	Stadium: Arsenal Stadium; Attendance: 15,120; Referee: Sergey Lapochkin

5 November 2017 16	Lokomotiv Moscow	2–2	CSKA Moscow	Moscow
16:30 MSK (UTC+3)	Miranchuk 14'; Rybus (yellow card) 62'; Fernandes (penalty missed) 76', 87'	Report	Vitinho 29'; Khosonov (yellow card) 40' (yellow-red card) 50'; Natkho 43'; A.Berezutski (yellow card) 48'; Wernbloom (yellow card) 57'; Vasin (yellow card) 75'	Stadium: RZD Arena; Attendance: 19,015; Referee: Sergei Karasev

18 November 2017 17	SKA-Khabarovsk	2–4	CSKA Moscow	Khabarovsk
11:00 MSK (UTC+3)	Dedechko 5'; Nikiforov (yellow card) 50'; Dimidko (yellow card) 61'; Marković 81'	Report	Dzagoev 12' (yellow card) 56'; Wernbloom 74', 83'; Golovin (yellow card) 77'; Vitinho 90+3'	Stadium: Lenin Stadium; Attendance: 5,569; Referee: Artem Chistyakov

26 November 2017 18	Rubin Kazan	0–1	CSKA Moscow	Kazan
14:00 MSK (UTC+3)	Granat (yellow card) 90+2'	Report	Wernbloom 45+1'; Khosonov (yellow card) 75'; Natkho (penalty missed) 90+2'	Stadium: Kazan Arena; Attendance: 8,422; Referee: Sergey Ivanov

1 December 2017 19	CSKA Moscow	6–0	Tosno	Moscow
19:30 MSK (UTC+3)	Vitinho 10' (pen.), 27' (pen.); Vasin 32'; Natkho 55'; Golovin 58' (penalty missed) 78'; Wernbloom 61'	Report	Zabolotny (yellow card) 60'	Stadium: VEB Arena; Attendance: 8,986; Referee: Roman Galimov

10 December 2017 20	Spartak Moscow	3–0	CSKA Moscow	Moscow
16:30 MSK (UTC+3)	Promes 10', 61'; Pašalić 90+8'	Report	Golovin (yellow card) 77'; Wernbloom (yellow card) 86'; Nababkin (yellow card) 90'; V.Berezutski (yellow card) 90+2'	Stadium: Otkrytiye Arena; Attendance: 44,062; Referee: Aleksei Nikolaev

3 March 2018 21	CSKA Moscow	1–0	Ural Yekaterinburg	Moscow
14:00 MSK (UTC+3)	Dzagoev 59'	Report	Ilyin (yellow card) 49'	Stadium: VEB Arena; Attendance: 8,500; Referee: Artem Chistyakov

11 March 2018 22	Akhmat Grozny	0–3	CSKA Moscow	Grozny
16:30 MSK (UTC+3)	Utsiyev (yellow card) 52'	Report	Golovin 6'; Vitinho 28'; A. Berezutski (yellow card) 62'; Ignashevich 68'; Shchennikov (yellow card) 71'	Stadium: Akhmat-Arena; Attendance: 14,570; Referee: Sergey Ivanov

1 April 2018 24	Rostov	1–2	CSKA Moscow	Rostov-on-Don
16:00 MSK (UTC+3)	Ingason (yellow card) 9' (goal) 61'; Kalachev (yellow card) 32'; Sapeta (yellow card) 76'	Report	Nababkin (yellow card) 32'; Shchennikov 44'; Wernbloom 75'	Stadium: Olimp-2; Attendance: 13,773; Referee: Roman Galimov

9 April 2018 25	CSKA Moscow	1–2	Dynamo Moscow	Moscow
19:30 MSK (UTC+3)	Chalov 60'; Wernbloom (yellow card) 68'; Dzagoev (yellow card) 80'	Report	Tashayev 11', 49' (yellow card) 83'; Sow (yellow card) 39'; Morozov (yellow card) 45'	Stadium: VEB Arena; Attendance: 19,504; Referee: Sergei Karasev

15 April 2018 26	Ufa	1–1	CSKA Moscow	Ufa
16:30 MSK (UTC+3)	Sysuyev 41'; Zhivoglyadov (yellow card) 77'	Report	Golovin (yellow card) 35'; Musa 87'	Stadium: Neftyanik Stadium; Attendance: 11,408; Referee: Evgeni Turbin

18 April 2018 23	CSKA Moscow	3–0	Amkar Perm	Moscow
19:30 MSK (UTC+3)	Vitinho 44'; Chalov 45+1', 61'	Report	Idowu (yellow card) 71'	Stadium: VEB Arena; Attendance: 8,016; Referee: Aleksey Sukhoy

22 April 2018 27	CSKA Moscow	2–1	Krasnodar	Moscow
16:30 MSK (UTC+3)	Kuchayev (yellow card) 21'; Musa 73', 85'	Report	Mamayev (yellow card) 44'; Gazinsky 53'	Stadium: VEB Arena; Attendance: 19,774; Referee: Sergey Lapochkin

29 April 2018 28	Zenit St.Petersburg	0–0	CSKA Moscow	Saint Petersburg
16:30 MSK (UTC+3)	Criscito (yellow card) 6'; Rigoni (yellow card) 84'; Paredes (yellow card) 90+3'	Report	Bistrović (yellow card) 5'; A.Berezutski (yellow card) 37'; V.Berezutski (yellow card) 43'; Shchennikov (yellow card) 58'	Stadium: Krestovsky Stadium; Attendance: 51,328; Referee: Roman Galimov

6 May 2018 29	CSKA Moscow	6–0	Arsenal Tula	Moscow
19:00 MSK (UTC+3)	Chalov 2', 21', 43'; Musa 11', 49'; Golovin 40'	Report	Aleksandrov (yellow card) 36'	Stadium: VEB Arena; Attendance: 18,311; Referee: Kirill Levnikov

13 May 2018 30	CSKA Moscow	2–1	Anzhi Makhachkala	Moscow
14:00 MSK (UTC+3)	Musa 9'; Nababkin (yellow card) 32'; Vitinho 61'; Golovin (yellow card) 68'	Report	Khubulov 33'; Danchenko (yellow card) 68'; Anton (yellow card) 90'	Stadium: VEB Arena; Attendance: 25,916; Referee: Sergey Lapochkin

==== League table ====
Pos	Team	Pld	W	D	L	GF	GA	GD	Pts	Qualification or relegation
1	Lokomotiv Moscow (C)	30	18	6	6	41	21	+20	60	Qualification for the Champions League group stage
2	CSKA Moscow	30	17	7	6	49	23	+26	58	Qualification for the Champions League group stage
3	Spartak Moscow	30	16	8	6	51	32	+19	56	Qualification for the Champions League third qualifying round
4	Krasnodar	30	16	6	8	46	30	+16	54	Qualification for the Europa League group stage (Note: Tosno qualified for the Europa League group stage by winning the 2017–18 Russian Cup. However, since they failed to obtain a UEFA licence, the spot awarded to the cup winners was passed to fourth-placed team, the spot awarded to the fourth-placed team was passed to fifth-placed team, and the spot awarded to the fifth-placed team was passed to sixth-placed team.)
5	Zenit Saint Petersburg	30	14	11	5	46	21	+25	53	Qualification for the Europa League third qualifying round

Updated to match(es) played on 13 May 2018. Source: Russian Premier League, Soccerway
Rules for classification: 1) Points; 2) Head-to-head points; 3) Head-to-head matches won; 4) Head-to-head goal difference; 5) Head-to-head goals scored; 6) Head-to-head away goals; 7) Matches won; 8) Goal difference; 9) Goals scored; 10) Away goals scored.
(C) Champions

=== Russian Cup ===
20 September 2017 Round of 32	Avangard Kursk	1–0 (a.e.t.)	CSKA Moscow	Kursk
17:00 MSK (UTC+3)	Korobov 114' (pen.)	Report	Natkho (yellow card) 90+1'; Nababkin (yellow card) 113'	Stadium: Trudovye Rezervy Stadium; Attendance: 11,029; Referee: Sergey Kulikov

=== UEFA Champions League ===
==== Qualifying rounds ====
25 July 2017 Third qualifying round 1st leg	AEK Athens (Greece)	0–2	(Russia) CSKA Moscow	Athens, Greece
20:00 MSK (UTC+3)	Rodríguez (yellow card) 90'	Report	Dzagoev 45+1'; Wernbloom 56'	Stadium: Olympic Stadium; Attendance: 25,083; Referee: Marco Fritz (Germany)

2 August 2017 Third qualifying round 2nd leg	CSKA Moscow (Russia)	1–0 (3–0 agg.)	(Greece) AEK Athens	Moscow, Russia
19:00 MSK (UTC+3)	Golovin (yellow card) 38'; Fernandes (yellow card) 59'; Vasin (yellow card) 67'; Natkho 74'	Report	Vranješ (yellow card) 20'; Mantalos (yellow card) 33'; Christodoulopoulos (yellow card) 90+4'	Stadium: VEB Arena; Attendance: 12,000; Referee: Benoît Millot (France)

15 August 2017 Playoff round 1st leg	Young Boys (Switzerland)	0–1	(Russia) CSKA Moscow	Bern, Switzerland
21:45 MSK (UTC+3)	Bertone (yellow card) 47'; Sanogo (yellow card) 56' von Bergen (yellow card) 90+3'	Report	Dzagoev (yellow card) 33'; Wernbloom (yellow card) 43'; Shchennikov (yellow card) 88'; Nuhu 90+1' (o.g.)	Stadium: Stade de Suisse; Attendance: 20,003; Referee: David Fernández Borbalán (Spain)

23 August 2017 Playoff round 2nd leg	CSKA Moscow (Russia)	2–0 (3–0 agg.)	(Switzerland) Young Boys	Moscow, Russia
21:45 MSK (UTC+3)	Shchennikov 45'; Dzagoev (yellow card) 48' (goal) 64'; A.Berezutski (yellow card) 59'	Report	Assalé (yellow card) 50'; Kasim (yellow card) 79'	Stadium: VEB Arena; Attendance: 15,560; Referee: Anastasios Sidiropoulos (Greece)

==== Group stage ====
Pos	Team	Pld	W	D	L	GF	GA	GD	Pts	Qualification	MUN	BSL	CSKA	BEN
1	(England) Manchester United	6	5	0	1	12	3	+9	15	Advance to knockout phase	—	3–0	2–1	2–0
2	(Switzerland) Basel	6	4	0	2	11	5	+6	12	Advance to knockout phase	1–0	—	1–2	5–0
3	(Russia) CSKA Moscow	6	3	0	3	8	10	−2	9	Transfer to Europa League	1–4	0–2	—	2–0
4	(Portugal) Benfica	6	0	0	6	1	14	−13	0		0–1	0–2	1–2	—

Source: UEFA

12 September 2017 1	Benfica (Portugal)	1–2	(Russia) CSKA Moscow	Lisbon, Portugal
21:45 MSK (UTC+3)	Seferovic 50' (yellow card) 80'; André Almeida (yellow card) 62'	Report	Golovin (yellow card) 43'; Vitinho 63' (pen.); Zhamaletdinov 71'; Dzagoev (yellow card) 73'; Wernbloom (yellow card) 75'	Stadium: Estádio da Luz; Attendance: 38,323; Referee: Alberto Undiano Mallenco (Spain)

27 September 2017 2	CSKA Moscow (Russia)	1–4	(England) Manchester United	Moscow, Russia
21:45 MSK (UTC+3)	Golovin (yellow card) 42'; Wernbloom (yellow card) 54'; Vitinho (yellow card) 59'; Kuchaev 90'	Report	Lukaku 4', 27'; Martial 19' (pen.); Mkhitaryan 57'	Stadium: VEB Arena; Attendance: 29,073; Referee: Jonas Eriksson (Sweden)

18 October 2017 3	CSKA Moscow (Russia)	0–2	(Switzerland) Basel	Moscow, Russia
21:45 MSK (UTC+3)	Natkho (yellow card) 73'	Report	Xhaka 29'; Oberlin 90'	Stadium: VEB Arena; Attendance: 27,996; Referee: Björn Kuipers (Netherlands)

31 October 2017 4	Basel (Switzerland)	1–2	(Russia) CSKA Moscow	Basel, Switzerland
22:45 MSK (UTC+3)	Zuffi 32'; Xhaka (yellow card) 60'; Balanta (yellow card) 75'	Report	Natkho (yellow card) 49'; Dzagoev 65'; Wernbloom 79'; Fernandes (yellow card) 84'	Stadium: St. Jakob-Park; Attendance: 33,303; Referee: Milorad Mažić (Serbia)

22 November 2017 5	CSKA Moscow (Russia)	2–0	(Portugal) Benfica	Moscow, Russia
20:00 MSK (UTC+3)	Shchennikov 13'; Wernbloom (yellow card) 39'; Jardel 56' (o.g.); Nababkin (yellow card) 70'; Natkho (yellow card) 72'	Report	Eliseu (yellow card) 31'; Luisão (yellow card) 61'	Stadium: VEB Arena; Attendance: 27,709; Referee: Deniz Aytekin (Germany)

5 December 2017 6	Manchester United (England)	2–1	(Russia) CSKA Moscow	Manchester, England
22:45 MSK (UTC+3)	Lukaku 64'; Rashford 66'; McTominay (yellow card) 73'	Report	Vitinho 45'; Berezutski (yellow card) 57'	Stadium: Old Trafford; Referee: Gianluca Rocchi (Italy)

=== UEFA Europa League ===
==== Knockout phase ====
13 February 2018 Round of 32 1st leg	Red Star Belgrade (Serbia)	0–0	(Russia) CSKA Moscow	Belgrade, Serbia
20:00 MSK (UTC+3)		Report	V.Berezutski (yellow card) 20'; Golovin (yellow card) 22'	Stadium: Rajko Mitić Stadium; Attendance: 35,642; Referee: Paweł Raczkowski (Poland)

21 February 2018 Round of 32 2nd leg	CSKA Moscow (Russia)	1–0 (1–0 agg.)	(Serbia) Red Star Belgrade	Moscow, Russia
20:00 MSK (UTC+3)	Dzagoev 45+1'; Wernbloom (yellow card) 51'; V.Berezutski (yellow card) 66'; Kuchayev (yellow card) 83'	Report	Le Tallec (yellow card) 49'; Stojković (yellow card) 69'	Stadium: VEB Arena; Attendance: 18,753; Referee: Jorge Sousa (Portugal)

8 March 2018 Round of 16 1st leg	CSKA Moscow (Russia)	0–1	(France) Lyon	Moscow, Russia
21:00 MSK (UTC+3)	Nababkin (yellow card) 30'; Natkho (yellow card) 59'	Report	Marcelo 68'; Tousart (yellow card) 88'	Stadium: VEB Arena; Attendance: 13,990; Referee: Antonio Mateu Lahoz (Spain)

15 March 2018 Round of 16 2nd leg	Lyon (France)	2–3 (3–3 (a) agg.)	(Russia) CSKA Moscow	Décines-Charpieu, France
23:05 MSK (UTC+3)	Cornet 58'; Mariano 71' (yellow card) 78'	Report	Nababkin (yellow card) 13'; Musa (yellow card) 36' (goal) 60'; Golovin 39'; Wernbloom 65'	Stadium: Parc Olympique Lyonnais; Attendance: 38,622; Referee: Bobby Madden (Scotland)

5 April 2018 Quarterfinal 1st leg	Arsenal (England)	4–1	(Russia) CSKA Moscow	London, England
22:05 MSK (UTC+3)	Ramsey 9', 28'; Lacazette 23' (pen.), 35'; Xhaka (yellow card) 57'; Bellerín (yellow card) 78'	Report	Golovin 15'; Dzagoev (yellow card) 31'; Musa (yellow card) 51'; Shchennikov (yellow card) 58'; Akinfeev (yellow card) 74'	Stadium: Emirates Stadium; Attendance: 58,285; Referee: Pavel Královec (Czech Republic)

12 April 2018 Quarterfinal 2nd leg	CSKA Moscow (Russia)	2–2 (3–6 agg.)	(England) Arsenal	Moscow, Russia
22:05 MSK (UTC+3)	Chalov 39'; Nababkin 50'; Golovin (yellow card) 86'	Report	Welbeck 75'; Ramsey 90+2'	Stadium: VEB Arena; Attendance: 29,284; Referee: Felix Zwayer (Germany)

== Squad statistics ==
As of match played 13 May 2018

=== Appearances and goals ===
No.	Pos	Nat	Player	Total		Premier League		Russian Cup		Champions League		Europa League	
No.	Pos	Nat	Player	Apps	Goals	Apps	Goals	Apps	Goals	Apps	Goals	Apps	Goals
1	GK	(Russia) RUS	Ilya Pomazun	3	0	2	0	1	0	0	0	0	0
2	DF	(Russia) RUS	Mário Fernandes	37	0	25	0	0	0	10	0	2	0
3	MF	(Sweden) SWE	Pontus Wernbloom	37	8	22+1	5	0	0	9	2	5	1
4	DF	(Russia) RUS	Sergei Ignashevich	36	1	23+2	1	0	0	5+1	0	5	0
5	DF	(Russia) RUS	Viktor Vasin	29	2	16	2	1	0	10	0	2	0
6	DF	(Russia) RUS	Aleksei Berezutski	29	1	18+1	1	0	0	6	0	4	0
7	FW	(Nigeria) NGR	Ahmed Musa	16	7	10	6	0	0	0	0	6	1
8	MF	(Bulgaria) BUL	Georgi Milanov	24	0	3+10	0	1	0	1+5	0	1+3	0
10	MF	(Russia) RUS	Alan Dzagoev	36	7	20+1	3	0	0	8+1	3	6	1
11	FW	(Brazil) BRA	Vitinho	46	12	22+8	10	0	0	10	2	2+4	0
14	DF	(Russia) RUS	Kirill Nababkin	26	1	16+3	0	1	0	1+1	0	3+1	1
17	MF	(Russia) RUS	Aleksandr Golovin	43	7	26+1	5	0+1	0	10	0	5	2
24	DF	(Russia) RUS	Vasili Berezutski	39	1	25	1	0	0	9	0	5	0
25	MF	(Croatia) CRO	Kristijan Bistrović	9	0	3+4	0	0	0	0	0	1+1	0
35	GK	(Russia) RUS	Igor Akinfeev	44	0	28	0	0	0	10	0	6	0
42	DF	(Russia) RUS	Georgi Shchennikov	30	5	18+1	3	0	0	9	2	1+1	0
63	FW	(Russia) RUS	Fyodor Chalov	31	7	10+10	6	1	0	6+1	0	1+2	1
66	MF	(Israel) ISR	Bibras Natkho	44	5	22+7	4	1	0	2+6	1	5+1	0
71	MF	(Russia) RUS	Nayair Tiknizyan	1	0	0	0	0+1	0	0	0	0	0
72	MF	(Russia) RUS	Astemir Gordyushenko	10	0	1+5	0	1	0	0+2	0	0+1	0
75	FW	(Russia) RUS	Timur Zhamaletdinov	21	2	4+10	1	0+1	0	1+5	1	0	0
80	MF	(Russia) RUS	Khetag Khosonov	8	0	1+4	0	1	0	0+1	0	0+1	0
82	MF	(Russia) RUS	Ivan Oleynikov	1	0	0	0	1	0	0	0	0	0
89	MF	(Russia) RUS	Konstantin Kuchayev	34	1	10+11	0	1	0	2+4	1	6	0
Players away from the club on loan:
31	MF	(Russia) RUS	Aleksandr Makarov	2	0	0+1	0	0	0	0+1	0	0	0
99	FW	(Nigeria) NGR	Aaron Olanare	11	1	5+2	1	1	0	1+2	0	0	0

=== Goalscorers ===
Place	Position	Nation	Number	Name	Premier League	Russian Cup	Champions League	Europa League	Total
1	FW	(Brazil)	11	Vitinho	10	0	2	0	12
2	MF	(Sweden)	3	Pontus Wernbloom	5	0	2	1	8
3	MF	(Russia)	10	Alan Dzagoev	3	0	3	1	7
4	FW	(Russia)	63	Fyodor Chalov	6	0	0	1	7
4	FW	(Nigeria)	7	Ahmed Musa	6	0	0	1	7
4	MF	(Russia)	17	Aleksandr Golovin	5	0	0	2	7
7	MF	(Israel)	66	Bibras Natkho	4	0	1	0	5
7	DF	(Russia)	42	Georgi Shchennikov	3	0	2	0	5
9	DF	(Russia)	5	Viktor Vasin	2	0	0	0	2
9	FW	(Russia)	75	Timur Zhamaletdinov	1	0	1	0	2
9				Own goal	0	0	2	0	2
12	FW	(Nigeria)	99	Aaron Olanare	1	0	0	0	1
12	DF	(Russia)	24	Vasili Berezutski	1	0	0	0	1
12	DF	(Russia)	6	Aleksei Berezutski	1	0	0	0	1
12	DF	(Russia)	4	Sergei Ignashevich	1	0	0	0	1
12	MF	(Russia)	89	Konstantin Kuchayev	0	0	1	0	1
12	DF	(Russia)	14	Kirill Nababkin	0	0	0	1	1
				TOTALS	49	0	14	6	69

=== Disciplinary record ===
Number	Nation	Position	Name	Premier League		Russian Cup		Champions League		Europa League		Total	
Number	Nation	Position	Name	Yellow card	Red card	Yellow card	Red card	Yellow card	Red card	Yellow card	Red card	Yellow card	Red card
2	(Russia)	DF	Mário Fernandes	2	0	0	0	2	0	0	0	4	0
3	(Sweden)	MF	Pontus Wernbloom	7	0	0	0	5	0	1	0	13	0
5	(Russia)	DF	Viktor Vasin	3	0	0	0	1	0	0	0	4	0
6	(Russia)	DF	Aleksei Berezutski	4	0	0	0	1	0	0	0	5	0
7	(Nigeria)	FW	Ahmed Musa	1	0	0	0	0	0	1	0	2	0
10	(Russia)	MF	Alan Dzagoev	3	0	0	0	3	0	1	0	7	0
11	(Brazil)	FW	Vitinho	3	0	0	0	2	0	0	0	5	0
14	(Russia)	DF	Kirill Nababkin	4	0	1	0	1	0	2	0	8	0
17	(Russia)	MF	Aleksandr Golovin	8	0	0	0	3	0	2	0	12	0
24	(Russia)	DF	Vasili Berezutski	2	0	0	0	1	0	2	0	5	0
25	(Croatia)	MF	Kristijan Bistrović	1	0	0	0	0	0	0	0	1	0
35	(Russia)	GK	Igor Akinfeev	1	0	0	0	0	0	1	0	2	0
42	(Russia)	DF	Georgi Shchennikov	2	0	0	0	1	0	1	0	4	0
66	(Israel)	MF	Bibras Natkho	3	0	1	0	3	0	1	0	8	0
80	(Russia)	MF	Khetag Khosonov	3	1	0	0	0	0	0	0	3	1
89	(Russia)	MF	Konstantin Kuchayev	4	1	0	0	0	0	1	0	5	1
			TOTALS	49	2	2	0	21	0	14	0	86	2
