= Ilya Pomazun =

Russian footballer (born 1996)

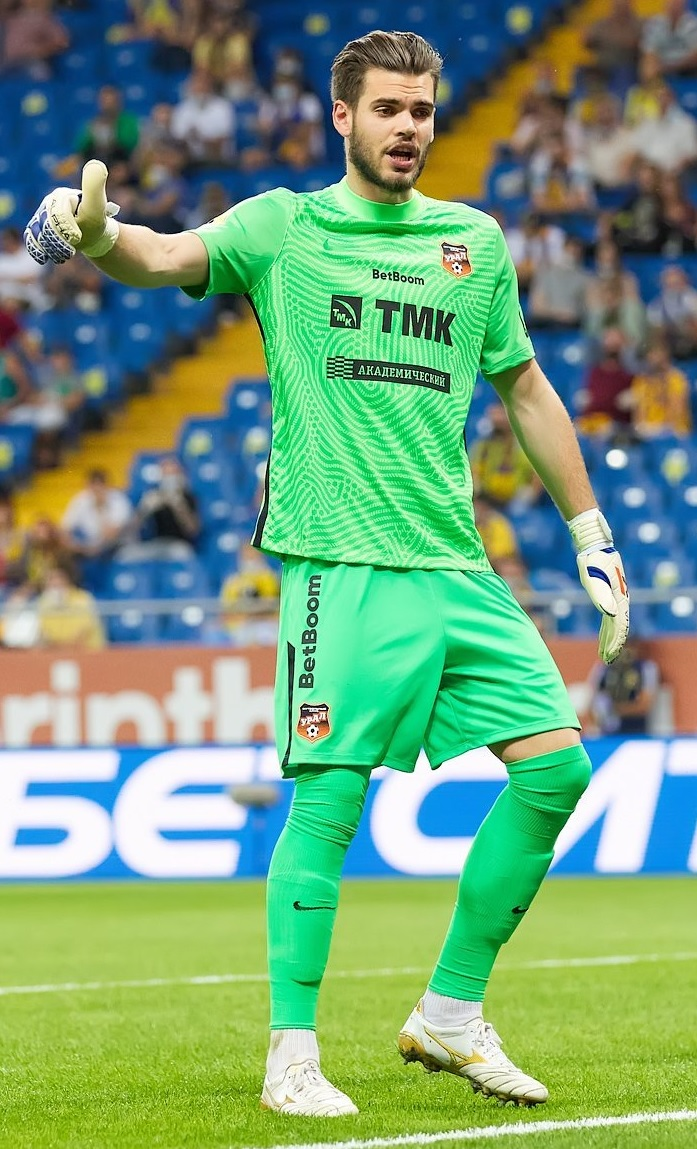
- Pomazun with Ural Yekaterinburg in 2020

Personal information
- Full name: Ilya Aleksandrovich Pomazun
- Date of birth: 16 August 1996 (age 30)
- Place of birth: Kaliningrad, Russia
- Height: 1.95 m (6 ft 5 in)
- Position: Goalkeeper

Team information
- Current team: Spartak Moscow
- Number: 1

Youth career
- 2001–2006: Torpedo-ZIL Moscow
- 2006–2012: CSKA Moscow

Senior career*
Years	Team	Apps	(Gls)
2012–2025	CSKA Moscow	4	(0)
2020–2021	→ Ural Yekaterinburg (loan)	17	(0)
2021–2024	→ Ural Yekaterinburg (loan)	84	(0)
2025–	Spartak Moscow	7	(0)

International career^{‡}
2017	Russia U21	1	(0)
2023–	Russia	1	(0)
- * Club domestic league appearances and goals as of 22 November 2026 ‡ National team caps and goals as of 16 October 2023

Ilya Aleksandrovich Pomazun (Russian: Илья Александрович Помазун; born 16 August 1996) is a Russian football player who plays as a goalkeeper for Spartak Moscow and the Russia national team.

== Career ==
=== Club ===
After first being included on CSKA Moscow roster in March 2012 at the age of 15, Pomazun made his debut in the Russian Premier League for the club on 6 August 2017 in a game against FC Rubin Kazan, due to an injury to the first-choice goalkeeper Igor Akinfeev.

In the 2018–19 UEFA Champions League group stage 1–0 victory over defending champions Real Madrid, starting goalkeeper Igor Akinfeev was sent off for complaining. Pomazun was injured for that game, so Georgi Kyrnats was substituted to replace Akinfeev. On the next Champions League game day on 23 October 2018, when Akinfeev was serving his disqualification, Pomazun started the away game against Roma which CSKA lost 0–3.

On 5 August 2020, he extended his CSKA contract throughout the 2024–25 season and joined FC Ural Yekaterinburg on loan for the 2020–21 season. On 25 February 2021, his loan was cut short and Pomazun returned to CSKA.

On 9 June 2021, he extended his contract with CSKA until the end of the 2025–26 season and joined Ural on loan once again, for the 2021–22 season.

On 16 June 2022, Pomazun extended his CSKA contract until 2027 and returned to Ural on loan for the 2022–23 season.

On 3 July 2023, Pomazun extended his CSKA contract until 2028 and returned to Ural on his fourth loan.

On 2 February 2025, Pomazun joined Spartak Moscow on a two-and-a-half-year contract. On 24 May 2026 in the 2026 Russian Cup final against Krasnodar, Pomazun was substituted in late and saved two penalty kicks in the decisive shoot-out, bringing the club a trophy (he also won the penalty shoot-out under similar circumstances in an earlier Cup round against Zenit St. Petersburg).

=== International ===
Pomazun was called up to the Russia national football team for the first time in March 2023 for a training camp. He made his debut on 16 October 2023 in a friendly against Kenya.

== Personal life ==
Pomazun's father, Oleksandr Pomazun, played as a goalkeeper, representing Ukraine internationally before re-settling in Russia.

== Career statistics ==
=== Club ===
As of match played 22 November 2026

Appearances and goals by club, season and competition
Club	Season	League			Cup		Continental		Other		Total	
Club	Season	Division	Apps	Goals	Apps	Goals	Apps	Goals	Apps	Goals	Apps	Goals
CSKA Moscow	2011–12	Russian Premier League	0	0	–		–		–		0	0
CSKA Moscow	2013–14	Russian Premier League	0	0	0	0	0	0	–		0	0
CSKA Moscow	2014–15	Russian Premier League	0	0	0	0	0	0	–		0	0
CSKA Moscow	2015–16	Russian Premier League	0	0	0	0	0	0	–		0	0
CSKA Moscow	2016–17	Russian Premier League	0	0	0	0	0	0	–		0	0
CSKA Moscow	2017–18	Russian Premier League	2	0	1	0	0	0	–		3	0
CSKA Moscow	2018–19	Russian Premier League	0	0	1	0	1 (Note: Appearance in the UEFA Champions League)	0	–		2	0
CSKA Moscow	2019–20	Russian Premier League	0	0	2	0	1 (Note: Appearance in the UEFA Europa League)	0	–		3	0
CSKA Moscow	2020–21	Russian Premier League	2	0	0	0	–		–		2	0
CSKA Moscow	Total		4	0	4	0	2	0	–		10	0
Ural (loan)	2020–21	Russian Premier League	17	0	0	0	–		–		17	0
Ural (loan)	2021–22	Russian Premier League	26	0	1	0	–		–		27	0
Ural (loan)	2022–23	Russian Premier League	29	0	10	0	–		–		39	0
Ural (loan)	2023–24	Russian Premier League	29	0	4	0	–		1 (Note: Appearance in the relegation play-offs)	0	34	0
Ural (loan)	Total		84	0	15	0	0	0	1	0	100	0
Spartak Moscow	2024–25	Russian Premier League	3	0	0	0	–		–		3	0
Spartak Moscow	2025–26	Russian Premier League	0	0	10	0	–		–		10	0
Spartak Moscow	2026–27	Russian Premier League	4	0	5	0	–		–		9	0
Spartak Moscow	Total		7	0	15	0	0	0	0	0	22	0
Career total			112	0	34	0	2	0	1	0	149	0

=== International ===
As of match played 16 October 2023

Appearances and goals by national team and year
National team	Year	Apps	Goals
Russia	2023	1	0
Total		1	0

== Honours ==
Spartak Moscow

- Russian Cup: 2025–26
