= Lucas Santos =

Brazilian footballer

Lucas Silva
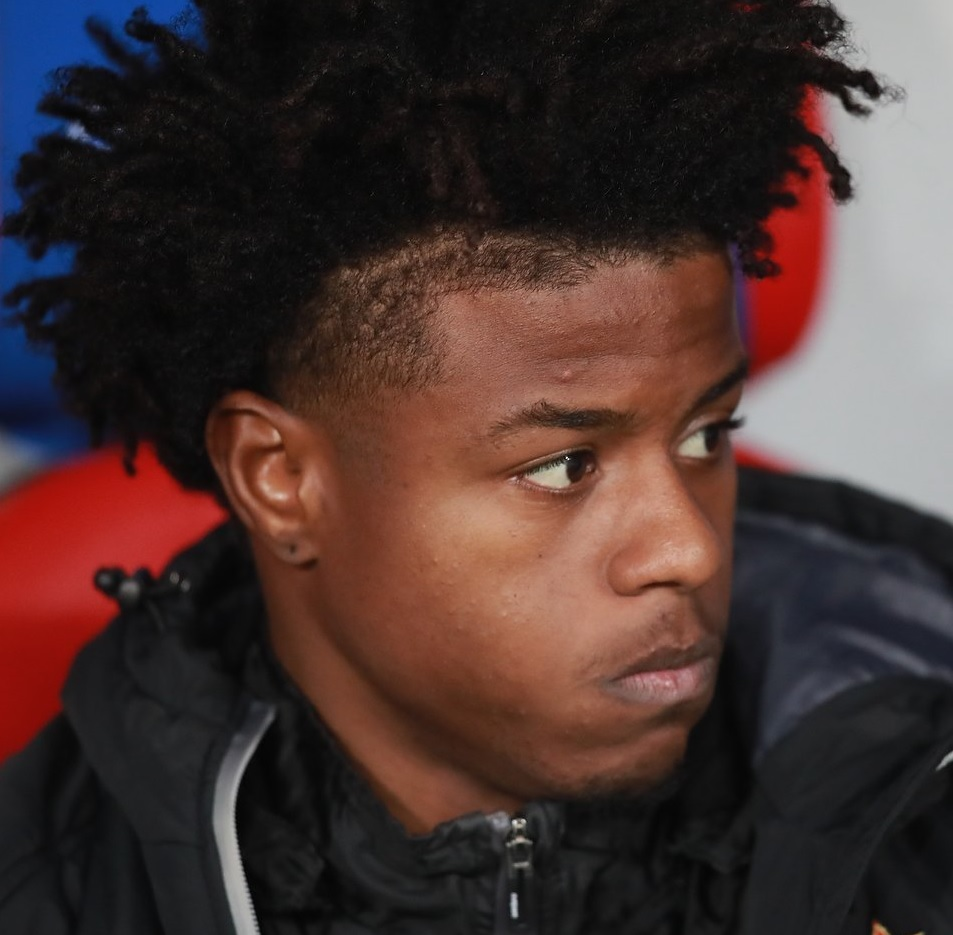
- Santos with CSKA Moscow in 2019

Personal information
- Full name: Lucas Santos da Silva
- Date of birth: 7 March 1999 (age 27)
- Place of birth: Rio de Janeiro, Brazil
- Height: 1.64 m (5 ft 4 1/2 in)
- Positions: Attacking midfielder; winger

Team information
- Current team: Associação Desportiva Bahia de Feira

Youth career
- 2005–2017: Vasco da Gama

Senior career*
Years	Team	Apps	(Gls)
2018–2021	Vasco da Gama	24	(0)
2019	→ CSKA Moscow (loan)	4	(0)
2021	→ Brasil de Pelotas (loan)	12	(0)
2022–2023	Tombense	8	(0)
2023–2025	Portuguesa-RJ	28	(5)
2025-	Bahia de Feira-BA	-	(-)
- * Club domestic league appearances and goals as of 27 May 2025

Lucas Santos da Silva, known as Lucas Santos or Lucas Silva (born 7 March 1999) is a Brazilian soccer player who plays as an attacking midfielder or a winger for Bahia de Feira.

== Club career ==
He made his professional debut in the Campeonato Carioca for Vasco da Gama on 24 January 2018 in a game against Cabofriense, replacing Bruno Paulista in the 75th minute.

On 2 September 2019, he signed with Russian club PFC CSKA Moscow on loan until the end of 2019, with CSKA holding an option to buy out his rights at the end of the loan. He made his Russian Premier League debut for CSKA on 15 September 2019 in a game against FC Tambov, replacing Konstantin Kuchayev in the 79th minute. On 10 January 2020, CSKA Moscow confirmed that Santos had returned to Vasco da Gama after his loan had expired.

== Career statistics ==
=== Club ===
As of 10 January 2020

Appearances and goals by club, season and competition
Club	Season	League			State League		National Cup		Continental		Other		Total	
Club	Season	Division	Apps	Goals	Apps	Goals	Apps	Goals	Apps	Goals	Apps	Goals	Apps	Goals
Vasco da Gama	2018	Série A	2	0	1	0	0	0	0	0	–		3	0
Vasco da Gama	2019	Série A	1	0	6	0	3	0	–		–		10	0
Vasco da Gama	Total		3	0	7	0	3	0	0	0	0	0	13	0
CSKA Moscow (loan)	2019–20	Russian Premier League	2	0	–		1	0	2	0	–		5	0
Career total			5	0	7	0	4	0	2	0	0	0	18	0
Zakho FC	2021–22	Iraqi Premier League	10	6	–		2	0	0	0	–		12	6
Career total			15	6	7	0	6	0	2	0	0	0	30	6
