= Alan Kokoyev =

Russian footballer and coach

Personal information
- Full name: Alan Chermenovich Kokoyev
- Date of birth: 10 August 1967 (age 59)
- Height: 1.80 m (5 ft 11 in)
- Position: Goalkeeper

Senior career*
Years	Team	Apps	(Gls)
1989–1990	FC Amur Komsomolsk-na-Amure	61	(0)
1991	FC Dinamo Gagra	1	(0)
1991–1993	FC Okean Nakhodka	44	(0)
1994	FC Dinamo Gagra		
1994	FC Liakhvi Tskhinvali (Georgia)		
1995–1998	FC Okean Nakhodka	71	(0)

Managerial career
- 2008: FC Okean Nakhodka (massage therapist)
- 2009–2010: FC Okean Nakhodka (assistant)
- * Club domestic league appearances and goals

Alan Chermenovich Kokoyev (Russian: Алан Черменович Кокоев; born 10 August 1967) is a Russian professional football coach and a former player.

Kokoyev played in the Russian Top League with FC Okean Nakhodka.

His son Batradz Kokoyev is now a professional footballer as well.
