= Batradz Kokoyev =

Russian footballer (born 1995)

Personal information
- Full name: Batradz Alanovich Kokoyev
- Date of birth: 12 August 1995 (age 31)
- Place of birth: Java, Georgia
- Height: 1.85 m (6 ft 1 in)
- Positions: Defender; midfielder

Senior career*
Years	Team	Apps	(Gls)
2012–2013	FC Alania Vladikavkaz	5	(0)
2014	FC Alania-d Vladikavkaz	16	(0)
2014–2016	FC Chernomorets Novorossiysk	50	(3)
2016–2018	FC Khimki	33	(0)
2018–2019	FC Volgar Astrakhan	24	(0)
2019–2022	FC Alania Vladikavkaz	39	(0)
2022	PFC Dynamo Stavropol	8	(0)
- * Club domestic league appearances and goals

Batradz Alanovich Kokoyev (Russian: Батрадз Аланович Кокоев; born 12 August 1995) is a Russian former football player.

== Career ==
He made his debut in the Russian Football National League for FC Alania Vladikavkaz on 7 August 2013 in a game against FC Ufa.

== Personal ==
His father Alan Kokoyev played in the Russian Premier League for FC Okean Nakhodka.
