= Konstantin Kuchayev =

Russian footballer (born 1998)

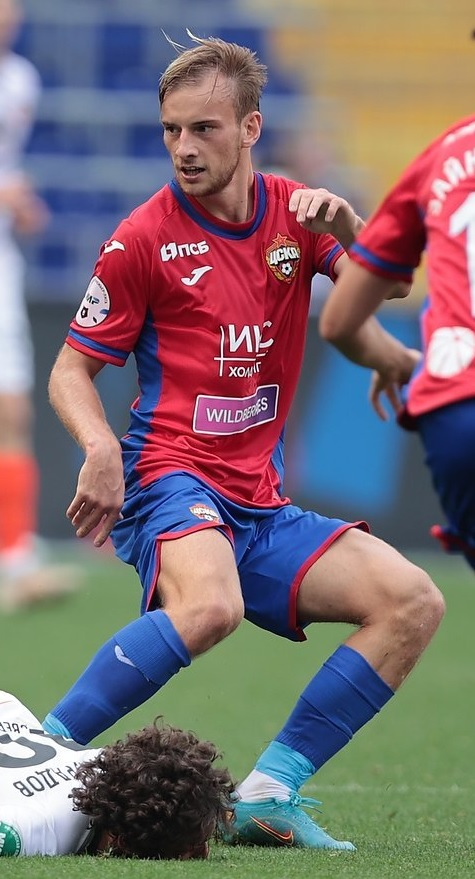
- Kuchayev with CSKA Moscow in 2022

Personal information
- Full name: Konstantin Vitalyevich Kuchayev
- Date of birth: 18 March 1998 (age 28)
- Place of birth: Ryazan, Russia
- Height: 1.83 m (6 ft 0 in)
- Positions: Right winger; attacking midfielder

Team information
- Current team: Rostov
- Number: 18

Youth career
- 2009–2012: Ryazansky Rayon Ryazan
- 2012–2015: UOR-5 Yegoryevsk
- 2015–2017: CSKA Moscow

Senior career*
Years	Team	Apps	(Gls)
2017–2023	CSKA Moscow	111	(8)
2022	→ Rubin Kazan (loan)	9	(1)
2024	Pari Nizhny Novgorod	9	(0)
2024–	Rostov	59	(4)

International career^{‡}
2015	Russia U17	3	(0)
2015–2016	Russia U18	8	(1)
2016	Russia U19	6	(0)
2017–2020	Russia U21	11	(2)
2020–	Russia	2	(0)
- * Club domestic league appearances and goals as of 20 November 2026 ‡ National team caps and goals as of 14 October 2025

Konstantin Vitalyevich Kuchayev (Russian: Константин Витальевич Кучаев; born 18 March 1998) is a Russian professional footballer who plays as a right winger or attacking midfielder for Rostov and the Russia national team.

== Club career ==
=== CSKA Moscow ===
Kuchayev began his career with a football school in his hometown of Ryazan at the age of 8. Six years later, he joined Master-Saturn Yegoryevsk and moved to Moscow Oblast in 2012. While playing there, Kuchayev was spotted by CSKA Moscow scout Andrey Movsisyan and joined for the club in 2015.

Kuchayev made his senior debut with CSKA on 2 April 2017, in a 2–1 Russian Premier League win over Krylia Sovetov Samara. Having established himself in the team the following season, on 27 September 2017, Kuchayev scored his first goal for the club, coming on as a substitute to score CSKA's only goal in a 1–4 loss to Manchester United in the UEFA Champions League group stage.

On 6 May 2017, Kuchayev tore his cruciate ligament in his left knee during a 6–0 home win over Arsenal Tula, keeping him out for six months. He missed the first half of 2018–19 season and returned to the team on 23 November as a substitute in a 2–0 away win against Akhmat Grozny. Kuchayev also missed the remainder of that season due to a meniscus injury he picked up in February 2019.

On 8 August 2020, Kuchayev scored his first goal in the Russian Premier League on the first day of the season in a 2–0 win over Khimki. He also scored in the following match, helping CSKA to a 2–1 win against Tambov at VEB Arena. Four goals in six appearances in August 2020 won Kuchayev the Russian Premier League Player of the Month award.

==== Rubin Kazan loan ====
On 26 January 2022, he joined Rubin Kazan on loan until the end of the 2021–22 season, with an option to purchase. Before the loan was agreed upon, Kuchayev extended his contract with CSKA until the end of the 2023–24 season. Rubin did not exercise the purchase option.

=== Pari NN ===
On 22 February 2024, Kuchayev signed with Pari Nizhny Novgorod until the end of the 2023–24 season.

=== Rostov ===
On 20 June 2024, Kuchayev moved to Rostov.

== International career ==
Having represented Russia at various youth levels, Kuchayev scored two goals in nine matches during the 2021 UEFA European U-21 Championship qualifying, helping his team reach for the final tournament. On 15 March 2021, he was called up to the 23-man squad for the group stage of the tournament; however, five days later, he was ruled out due to a muscle injury.

On 2 November 2020, Kuchayev was named in Stanislav Cherchesov's Russia squad for the friendly match against Moldova and the UEFA Nations League fixtures against Turkey and Serbia. On 12 November 2020, Kuchayev made his senior national team debut as a half-time substitute in a 0–0 draw against Moldova.

After a five-year break, Kuchayev was called up to the national team in October 2025 for friendlies.

== Personal life ==
Kuchayev is in a relationship with a former figure skater Elena Radionova. They were engaged in late 2022.

== Career statistics ==
=== Club ===
As of match played 20 November 2026

Appearances and goals by club, season and competition
Club	Season	League			National Cup		Continental		Other		Total	
Club	Season	Division	Apps	Goals	Apps	Goals	Apps	Goals	Apps	Goals	Apps	Goals
CSKA Moscow	2016–17	Russian Premier League	2	0	0	0	0	0	—		2	0
CSKA Moscow	2017–18	Russian Premier League	21	0	1	0	12 (Note: Six appearances and one goal in the UEFA Champions League, six appearances in the UEFA Europa League)	1	—		34	1
CSKA Moscow	2018–19	Russian Premier League	3	0	0	0	2 (Note: Appearances in the UEFA Champions League)	0	—		5	0
CSKA Moscow	2019–20	Russian Premier League	25	0	3	0	6 (Note: Appearances in the UEFA Europa League)	0	—		34	0
CSKA Moscow	2020–21	Russian Premier League	21	6	0	0	4	0	–		25	6
CSKA Moscow	2021–22	Russian Premier League	13	0	2	1	—		—		15	1
CSKA Moscow	2022–23	Russian Premier League	14	2	9	1	—		—		23	3
CSKA Moscow	2023–24	Russian Premier League	12	0	2	0	—		1 (Note: Appearance in Russian Super Cup)	0	15	0
CSKA Moscow	Total		111	8	17	2	24	1	1	0	153	11
Rubin Kazan (loan)	2021–22	Russian Premier League	9	1	1	0	—		—		10	1
Nizhny Novgorord	2023–24	Russian Premier League	9	0	—		—		2 (Note: Appearances in Relegation playoffs)	0	11	0
Rostov	2024–25	Russian Premier League	21	1	11	1	—		—		32	2
Rostov	2025–26	Russian Premier League	24	1	1	0	—		—		25	1
Rostov	2026–27	Russian Premier League	14	2	1	0	—		—		15	2
Rostov	Total		59	4	13	1	0	0	0	0	72	5
Career total			188	13	31	3	24	1	3	0	246	17

=== International ===
As of match played 14 October 2025

Appearances and goals by national team and year
National team	Year	Apps	Goals
Russia	2020	1	0
Russia	2025	1	0
Total		2	0

== Honours ==
=== Club ===
CSKA Moscow

- Russian Cup: 2022–23

=== Individual ===
- Russian Premier League Player of the Month: August 2020
