= Danil Savinykh =

Russian footballer

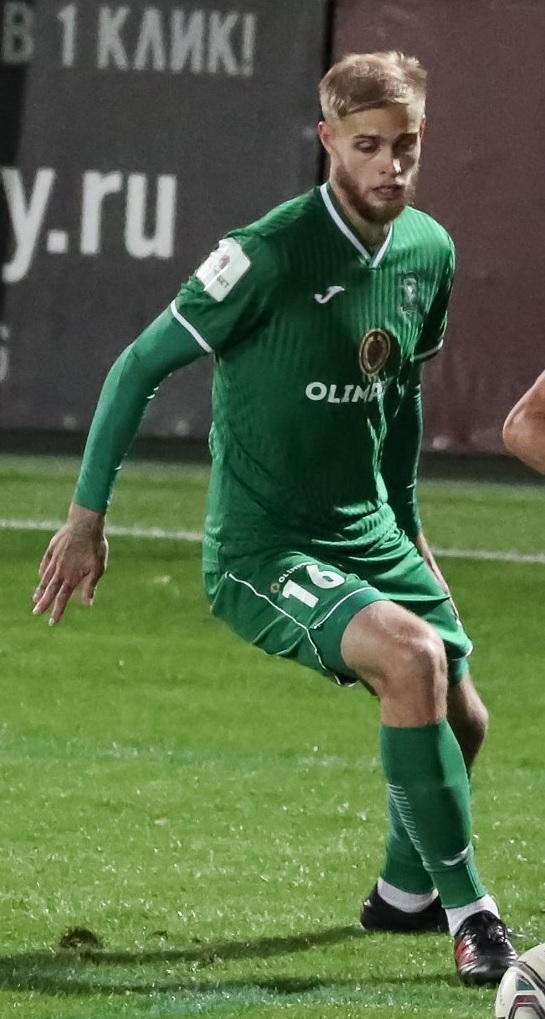
- Savinykh with Tom Tomsk in 2021

Personal information
- Full name: Danil Sergeyevich Savinykh
- Date of birth: 16 January 2001 (age 25)
- Place of birth: Tomsk, Russia
- Height: 1.88 m (6 ft 2 in)
- Position: Defender

Youth career
- 2017–2019: CSKA Moscow

Senior career*
| Years | Team | Apps | (Gls) |
| 2021–2022 | Tom Tomsk | 20 | (0) |
| 2022–2023 | Zenit St. Petersburg | 11 | (0) |
| 2023 | Leon Saturn | 14 | (0) |
| 2024 | Druzhba Maykop | 19 | (0) |
- * Club domestic league appearances and goals as of 16 November 2024

Danil Sergeyevich Savinykh (Russian: Данил Сергеевич Савиных; born 16 January 2001) is a Russian football player.

== Club career ==
He made his debut in the Russian Football National League for Tom Tomsk on 29 August 2021 in a game against Rotor Volgograd.
