= Aleksei Sukharev =

Russian footballer

Personal information
- Full name: Aleksei Sergeyevich Sukharev
- Date of birth: 11 January 2003 (age 23)
- Place of birth: Kursk, Russia
- Height: 1.79 m (5 ft 10 in)
- Position: Defender

Team information
- Current team: Saturn Ramenskoye
- Number: 46

Senior career*
Years	Team	Apps	(Gls)
2018–2020	Avangard Kursk	14	(1)
2020	→ CSKA Moscow (loan)	0	(0)
2021–2022	CSKA Moscow	0	(0)
2022–2023	SKA Rostov-on-Don	18	(0)
2023	Rodina-2 Moscow	1	(0)
2023–2024	Leon Saturn Ramenskoye	37	(3)
2025	Forte Taganrog	12	(0)
2025–2026	Avangard Kursk	26	(1)
2026–	Saturn Ramenskoye	13	(1)

International career^{‡}
2019	Russia U17	2	(0)
- * Club domestic league appearances and goals as of 31 October 2026 ‡ National team caps and goals as of 12 December 2019

Aleksei Sergeyevich Sukharev (Russian: Алексей Сергеевич Сухарев; born 11 January 2003) is a Russian football player who plays for Saturn Ramenskoye.

== Club career ==
Sukharev made his debut in the Russian Football National League for Avangard Kursk on 24 July 2019 in a game against Tom Tomsk.

On 16 June 2020, CSKA Moscow confirmed that Sukharev's loan deal with the club had ended and he'd left CSKA.

On 21 January 2021, a permanent transfer to CSKA has been confirmed by Avangard.
