= Roman Pukhov =

Russian footballer

Personal information
- Full name: Roman Yevgenyevich Pukhov
- Date of birth: 7 December 2000 (age 25)
- Place of birth: Ivanovo, Russia
- Height: 1.82 m (6 ft 0 in)
- Position: Midfielder

Youth career
- 2017–2018: PFC CSKA Moscow
- 2018–2019: FC Dynamo Moscow

Senior career*
Years	Team	Apps	(Gls)
2019–2021	FC Fakel Voronezh	21	(0)
2020–2021	FC Fakel-M Voronezh	16	(4)
2021–2022	FC Dynamo Vladivostok	24	(7)
2022	FC Zenit Penza	1	(0)
2023	FC Znamya Noginsk	10	(3)
- * Club domestic league appearances and goals

Roman Yevgenyevich Pukhov (Russian: Роман Евгеньевич Пухов; born 7 December 2000) is a Russian former football player.

== Club career ==
He played for PFC CSKA Moscow in the 2017–18 UEFA Youth League.

He made his debut in the Russian Football National League for FC Fakel Voronezh on 7 July 2019 in a game against FC Torpedo Moscow.
