= Georgi Kyrnats =

Russian footballer

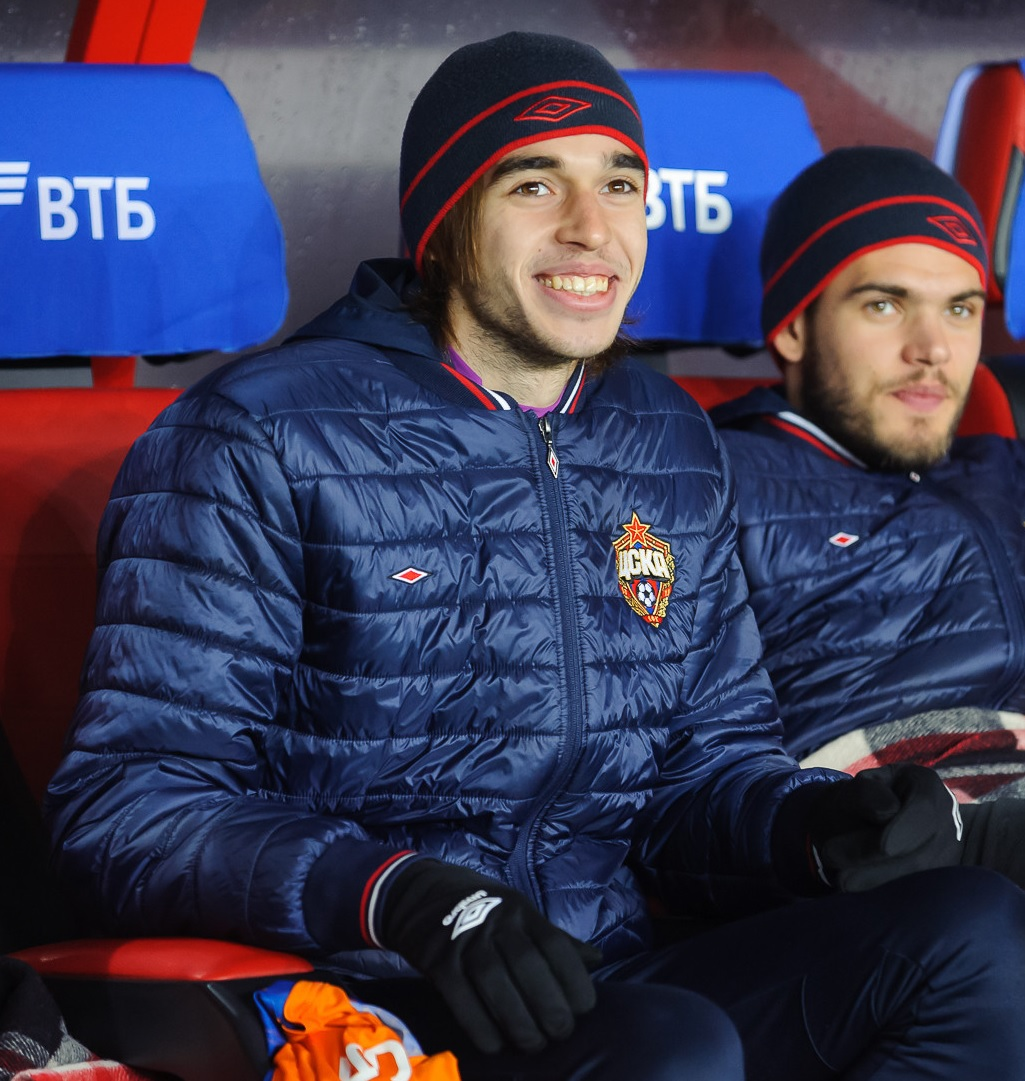
- Kyrnats with CSKA Moscow in 2018

Personal information
- Full name: Georgi Valeryevich Kyrnats
- Date of birth: 22 June 1998 (age 28)
- Place of birth: Moscow, Russia
- Height: 1.92 m (6 ft 4 in)
- Position: Goalkeeper

Senior career*
Years	Team	Apps	(Gls)
2015–2019	CSKA Moscow	0	(0)
2019–2021	SKA-Khabarovsk	0	(0)
2021	SKA-Khabarovsk-2	14	(0)

International career
2016	Russia U18	2	(0)
- * Club domestic league appearances and goals

Georgi Valeryevich Kyrnats (Russian: Георгий Валерьевич Кырнац; born 22 June 1998) is a Russian former professional football player.

== Club career ==
Kyrnats was first included on CSKA's first team roster in February 2015 at the age of 16. He made appearances for the club's Under-19 squad in the 2015–16 UEFA Youth League and 2016–17 UEFA Youth League.

He made his professional debut in the 2018–19 UEFA Champions League group stage for CSKA Moscow on 2 October 2018, 8 minutes into added time of their 1–0 victory over defending champions Real Madrid, after starting goalkeeper Igor Akinfeev was sent off for complaining. In the minute he spent on the pitch, he did not touch the ball once, and covered less distance than any player in the Champions League in the 2018–19 season, 39 meters.

On 22 August 2019, he signed with SKA-Khabarovsk.
