= Nikolay Zirikov =

Russian footballer

Personal information
- Full name: Nikolay Mikhailovich Zirikov
- Date of birth: 22 May 2000 (age 26)
- Place of birth: Moscow, Russia
- Height: 1.88 m (6 ft 2 in)
- Position: Goalkeeper

Youth career
- –2014: FC Dynamo Moscow
- 2015: FC Torpedo Moscow
- 2016–2017: PFC CSKA Moscow

Senior career*
Years	Team	Apps	(Gls)
2017–2020	PFC CSKA Moscow	0	(0)
2020	FC Metallurg Vidnoye	2	(0)
2020–2021	FC Shinnik Yaroslavl	7	(0)
2021–2023	FC Dynamo Saint Petersburg	58	(0)
2023–2024	FC Neftekhimik Nizhnekamsk	0	(0)
2025	FC Dynamo Saint Petersburg	1	(0)

International career^{‡}
2017–2018	Russia U-18	8	(0)
2018–2019	Russia U-19	3	(0)
- * Club domestic league appearances and goals as of 1 November 2025 ‡ National team caps and goals as of 22 February 2019

Nikolay Mikhailovich Zirikov (Russian: Николай Михайлович Зириков; born 22 May 2000) is a Russian football player.

== Club career ==
He made his debut in the Russian Football National League for FC Shinnik Yaroslavl on 13 October 2020 in a game against FC Neftekhimik Nizhnekamsk.

== Personal life ==
His older brother Ivan Zirikov is also a football goalkeeper.
