= Alan Dzagoev =

Russian footballer (born 1990)

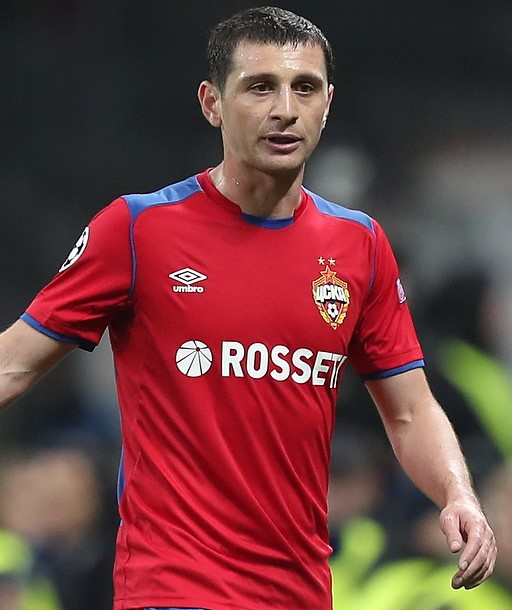
- Dzagoev with CSKA Moscow in 2018

Personal information
- Full name: Alan Yelizbarovich Dzagoev
- Date of birth: 17 June 1990 (age 36)
- Place of birth: Beslan, North Ossetian ASSR, Russian SFSR, Soviet Union
- Height: 1.78 m (5 ft 10 in)
- Position: Midfielder

Youth career
- 1999–2005: Yunost Vladikavkaz
- 2005–2006: Konoplyov football academy

Senior career*
Years	Team	Apps	(Gls)
2006–2007	Krylia Sovetov-SOK	37	(6)
2008–2022	CSKA Moscow	282	(55)
2022–2023	Rubin Kazan	20	(3)
2023	Lamia	2	(0)
Total		341	(64)

International career
2007	Russia U-17	6	(4)
2009–2013	Russia U-21	3	(1)
2008–2018	Russia	59	(9)
- * Club domestic league appearances and goals

Alan Yelizbarovich Dzagoev (Russian: Алан Елизбарович Дзагоев, pronounced [ɐˈlan jɪlʲɪˈzbarəvʲɪdʑ dzɐˈgo(j)ɪf]; Iron Ossetic: Дзӕгъойты Елизбары фырт Алан; romanized as Dzagoyev; born 17 June 1990) is a Russian former professional footballer who played as a midfielder.

After joining Akademiya Tolyatti in 2006, he remained there for two seasons before transferring to CSKA Moscow. Following a successful debut season in the Russian Premier League, he won the award for Best Young Player in the league and made his way into the Russian national team. He is regarded as a star in his native North Ossetia.

A full international for Russia since 2008, he was the joint top scorer at UEFA Euro 2012 and also played at the 2014 FIFA World Cup and 2018 FIFA World Cup.

Dzagoev has won three Russian Premier League titles and four Russian Cups.

== Early and personal life ==
Dzagoev (born Zagoshvili), the younger of two sons of Yelizbar (who is commonly referred to as Tariel) and Lyana, was born and raised in Beslan, North Ossetia–Alania, to which his family, ethnic Ossetians from Georgia, moved in 1989. He played football on the streets with his brother Gela right up to the second grade of elementary school, when their mother, a passionate football fan, brought them to the Terek Beslan youth team.

In 2000, Dzagoev moved to Vladikavkaz to play for a local youth team, Yunost. As their team used to attend Alania Vladikavkaz matches, he became their fan. He describes Valery Gazzaev, an Ossetic footballing legend who later became his coach at CSKA Moscow, as his childhood hero, also stating that Evgeni Aldonin and Frank Lampard were role models for him. In July 2005, Dzagoev joined the Konoplyov football academy.

In July 2012, Dzagoev married Zarema Abayeva, who is originally from North Ossetia-Alania's capital, Vladikavkaz. They have two children - Elana (born 2013) and Khetag (born 2016).

== Club career ==
=== Akademiya Tolyatti ===
From January 2006 to December 2007, Dzagoev played for Akademiya Tolyatti, formerly known as Krylia Sovetov-SOK, of the Russian Second Division. He made his professional debut on 29 April 2006 in a 1–2 home defeat against Tyumen. He appeared in 37 matches and scored six goals for the team.

=== CSKA Moscow ===
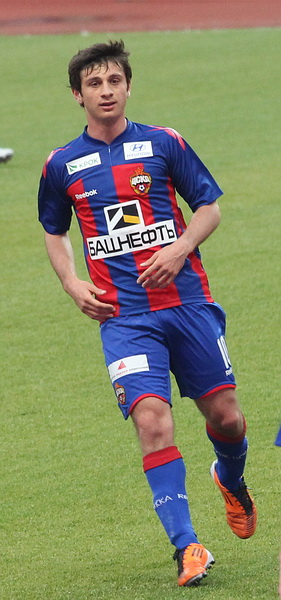
Dzagoev playing for CSKA in May 2011

Dzagoev signed for CSKA Moscow before the start of the 2008 Russian Premier League season. His first appearance was as a substitute in a match against Luch. A couple of games later, he appeared in the starting lineup in the home match against FC Khimki and managed to score a goal and two assists. He was also a starter when the team won the 2008 Russian Cup final. In the round 13 game against bitter rivals Spartak Moscow, Dzagoev made three assists, helping CSKA to secure a 5–1 victory and since then he has become an undisputed member of the first eleven. Dzagoev was also the man of the match when he scored two goals in a 1–3 away victory against UEFA Cup winners Zenit Saint Petersburg.

At the end of the 2008 season, Dzagoev was chosen as Best Young Player of the Year by the Russian Football Union. In October 2008, it was reported that Real Madrid were interested in signing the player, but it was not confirmed. In the 2008 season Dzagoev played 29 matches and scored 13 goals. Dzagoev scored from a very tight angle during a Champions League match against Manchester United on 4 November 2009, which finished 3–3. In 2009 season he played 40 matches and scored 10 goals.

On 2 December 2010, Dzagoev provided an assist for Sekou Oliseh and later added a cool finish as CSKA defeated Lausanne-Sports 5–1 in their penultimate group game, securing first place in Group F of the Europa League. In the final group game against Sparta Prague on 15 December, Dzagoev scored the opening goal as CSKA dropped their first points of their European campaign, succumbing to a 1–1 draw.

On 24 September 2011, Dzagoev scored the winning goal of a 3–1 Premier League victory over Volga Nizhny Novgorod. Three days later, Dzagoev scored a 45th-minute goal against Internazionale and a later strike from Vágner Love put the hosts level, until a late goal from Mauro Zárate gave the Italians a 3–2 victory. Dzagoev provided the cross from which CSKA debutant Pontus Wernbloom netted the equalizer in their 1–1 draw against Real Madrid in their first leg Round of 16 clash on 21 February 2012. In the 2012–13 season CSKA won the Russian Premier League title and Dzagoev was considered by some to be the best left midfielder. In 2013/2014 season CSKA became the champion of Russian Premier League again and Dzagoev played 23 matches and scored 3 goals in all competitions.

The 2015–16 season became one of the best in his career. On 21 May 2016 in the last match of Premier League with Rubin Dzagoev scored the winning goal and CSKA won another Russian Premier League title. In this season he played 43 matches, scores 8 goals and 11 assists in all club competitions. Dzagoev scored twice in the 2016–17 UEFA Champions League group stage, against Bayer Leverkusen and Tottenham Hotspur though the Moscow club exited Europe at this stage.

Having been sidelined with injury for much of 2017–18, Dzagoev returned to the CSKA side as a substitute in a Champions League match with FC Basel, scoring the goal at St. Jakob-Park.

On 21 June 2019, Dzagoev signed a new two-year contract with CSKA Moscow, keeping him at the club until the summer of 2021. On 1 July 2021, Dzagoev's contract with CSKA expired. At the end of the same month, the possibility of extending the contract until the end of the 2022–23 season was announced. In the 2021–22 season, Dzagoev appeared in 20 matches and recorded 3 assists, and CSKA itself was not going to win medals again. In May 2022, information appeared that, despite the current contract, Dzagoev would leave the club at the end of the season. Dzagoev soon denied these reports. On 20 May 2022, CSKA's official website confirmed the midfielder's departure at the end of the season.

=== Rubin Kazan ===
On 2 September 2022, Dzagoev signed a contract until the end of the season with recently-relegated to Russian First League club Rubin Kazan, reuniting with his former manager at CSKA, Leonid Slutsky.

=== Lamia ===
On 28 September 2023, after his contract with Rubin Kazan had expired, Dzagoev signed a one-year deal with Super League Greece club Lamia. On 21 November 2023, Dzagoev announced his retirement due to persistent injuries.

== International career ==
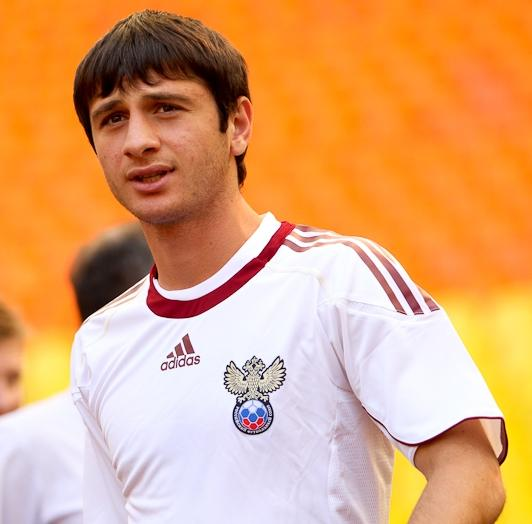
Dzagoev with the Russia national football team in 2011

After a string of impressive performances at club level, Dzagoev was called up to Russia squad for a 2010 World Cup qualification match against Germany scheduled for 11 October 2008. He made his debut as a half-time substitute, at the age of 18 years and 116 days, thus becoming the youngest outfield player ever to compete for Russia, and second youngest overall after goalkeeper and CSKA teammate Igor Akinfeev. Dzagoev nearly earned the team a crucial away draw as he flicked the ball past Germany's goalkeeper René Adler, but hit the crossbar.

After the game, Russia manager Guus Hiddink stated, "He's gelled into the team very well... Alan is a really clever player with the ability to make a killer pass and stretch the play. He proved that in Germany once again." Dzagoev himself, however, being unhappy with the defeat, labeled his debut "a flop."

He scored his first international goal on 8 October 2010 in a 2–3 away victory over the Republic of Ireland in the qualifying round of UEFA Euro 2012. He was confirmed for the finalized squad for Euro 2012 on 25 May 2012. Dzagoev scored two goals in Russia's opening game of the Euro 2012 tournament against the Czech Republic on 8 June 2012, a 4–1 victory, in which he was named Man of the Match. Dzagoev added his third goal of the tournament in his side's second game against Poland, earning a 1–1 draw for his side. With three goals scored, he finished the tournament as joint-top scorer, alongside Cristiano Ronaldo, Fernando Torres, Mario Gómez, Mario Balotelli, and Mario Mandžukić.

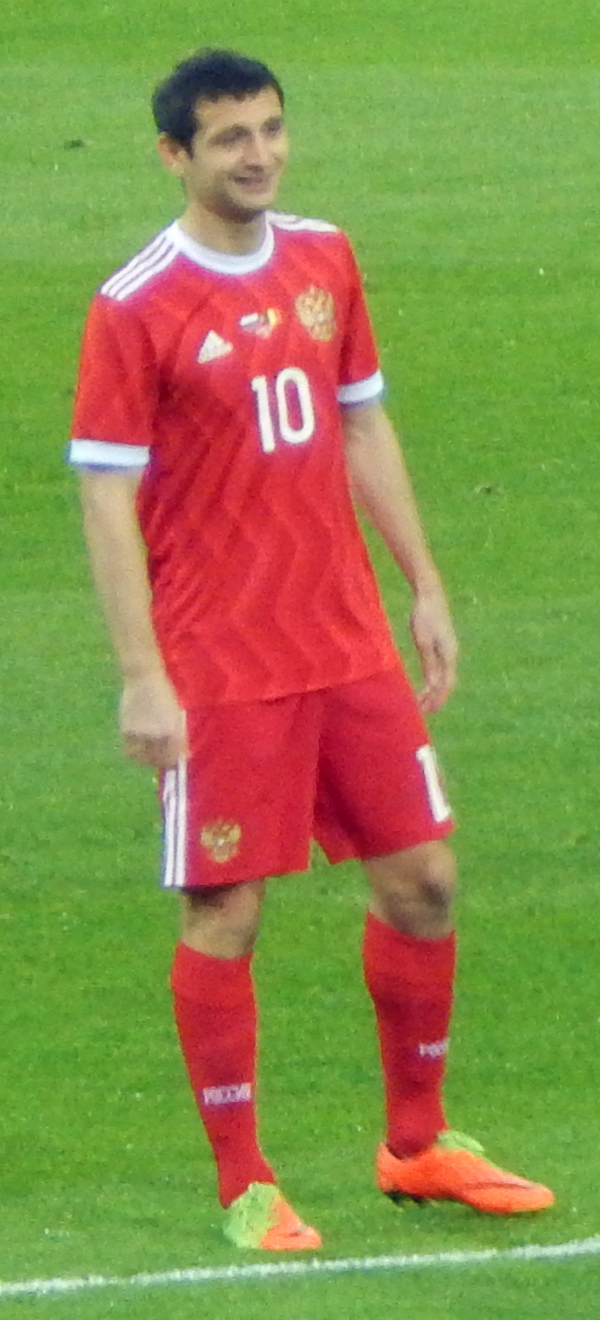
Dzagoev playing for Russia against Belgium, 2017

On 2 June 2014, he was included in Russia's squad for the 2014 FIFA World Cup . Dzagoev appeared as a substitute in all three of the team's matches as Russia were eliminated at the group stage.

Dzagoev was included in Russia's squad for UEFA Euro 2016; however he withdrew due to injury on 22 May 2016. He was excluded from the nation's squad for the FIFA Confederations Cup exactly a year later, again with an injury.

On 11 May 2018, he was included in Russia's extended 2018 FIFA World Cup squad. On 3 June 2018, he was included in the finalized World Cup squad. He featured in the opening match of the tournament against Saudi Arabia but was withdrawn through injury after just 24 minutes. He recovered from injury to come on as a substitute in extra time against Croatia in the quarterfinals. He took a free kick that went brilliantly on to the head of Mariò Fernandes that was Russia's 2–2 equalizer with 5 minutes left to play in extra time. Dzagoev converted his shot in the eventual penalty shoot-out, but Russia lost to Croatia in the end of it.

== Style of play ==
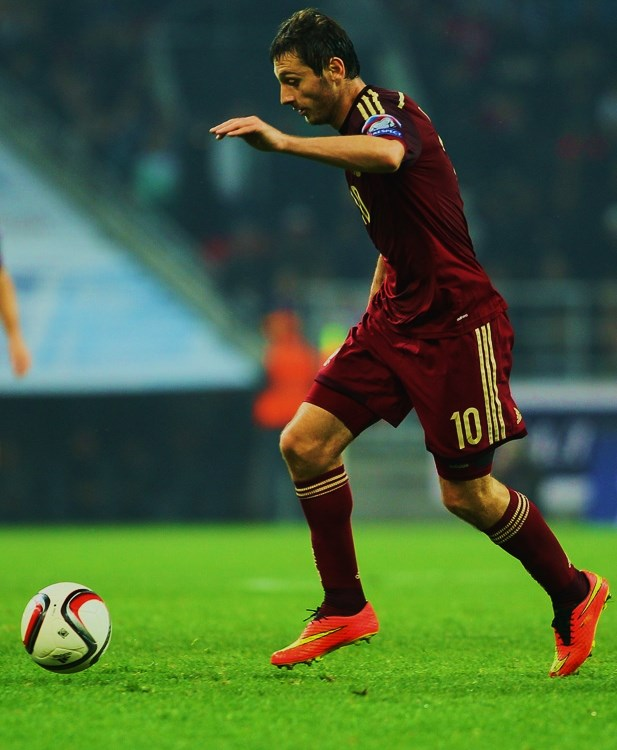
Dzagoev in Russian colours, 2014

Dzagoev is a playmaker, who "enjoys playing behind the strikers". His main position is on the left side of midfield. However, he is versatile, having also played "on the right side of Russia's three-man attack" in their win over the Czech Republic at EURO 2012 in which Dzagoev scored two.

In 2009, ESPN SoccerNet called Dzagoev "one of the hottest prospects on the continent", commenting that he is "quick, good in the air and with exceptional technical skills". He has been recognised as the finest in the country in his position, being declared the best left-midfielder in 2013. He was also named as Russia's "star man" by BBC Sport when they compiled their UEFA EURO 2012 team profiles. When CSKA manager Leonid Slutsky was asked of Dzagoev following a goal against Tottenham Hotspur in 2016, he opined: "it's obvious Alan Dzagoev is one of the top players in the Russian league", adding that it was "not surprising that scouts were watching him and it will not be surprising if he continues his career in one of the top British clubs". Shortly before the last round of international friendlies in the run-up to the 2018 FIFA World Cup, The Guardian branded Dzagoev as one of "three Russia players with the capacity to harm top-level opponents".

== Career statistics ==
=== Club ===
As of match played 29 October 2023

Club	Season	League				National Cup			Super Cup			Europe			Total		
Club	Season	Division	Apps	Goals	Assists	Apps	Goals	Assists	Apps	Goals	Assists	Apps	Goals	Assists	Apps	Goals	Assists
Krylia Sovetov SOK	2006	Russian Second Division	12	1	0	1	0	0	—						13	1	0
Krylia Sovetov SOK	2007	Russian Second Division	25	5	0	1	0	0	—						26	5	0
Krylia Sovetov SOK	Total		37	6	0	2	0	0	—						39	6	0
CSKA Moscow	2008	Russian Premier League	20	8	10	3	2	0	0	0	0	6	3	0	29	13	10
CSKA Moscow	2009	Russian Premier League	27	7	12	2	0	0	1	0	0	10	3	1	40	10	13
CSKA Moscow	2010	Russian Premier League	24	6	6	1	0	0	1	0	0	10	2	4	36	8	10
CSKA Moscow	2011–12	Russian Premier League	31	5	14	5	0	0	1	0	0	11	1	4	48	6	18
CSKA Moscow	2012–13	Russian Premier League	24	7	10	4	0	0	0	0	0	2	0	0	30	7	10
CSKA Moscow	2013–14	Russian Premier League	18	3	5	3	0	0	1	0	1	1	0	0	23	3	6
CSKA Moscow	2014–15	Russian Premier League	21	5	6	4	2	2	0	0	0	3	0	0	28	7	8
CSKA Moscow	2015–16	Russian Premier League	29	6	5	4	1	0	0	0	0	10	2	1	43	9	6
CSKA Moscow	2016–17	Russian Premier League	15	3	6	0	0	0	0	0	0	3	2	0	18	5	6
CSKA Moscow	2017–18	Russian Premier League	21	3	7	0	0	0	0	0	0	15	4	1	36	7	8
CSKA Moscow	2018–19	Russian Premier League	7	0	0	0	0	0	1	0	0	3	0	0	11	0	0
CSKA Moscow	2019–20	Russian Premier League	10	0	0	1	0	0	0	0	0	1	0	0	12	0	0
CSKA Moscow	2020–21	Russian Premier League	15	2	2	3	0	1	0	0	0	3	0	0	22	2	3
CSKA Moscow	2021–22	Russian Premier League	20	0	3	2	0	0	0	0	0	0	0	0	22	0	3
CSKA Moscow	Total		282	55	86	32	5	3	5	0	1	78	17	11	397	77	101
Rubin Kazan	2022–23	Russian First League	20	3	0	0	0	0	0	0	0	0	0	0	20	3	0
Lamia	2023–24	Super League Greece	2	0	0	0	0	0	0	0	0	0	0	0	2	0	0
Career total			341	64	86	34	5	3	5	0	1	78	17	11	458	86	101

=== International ===
As of 7 July 2018

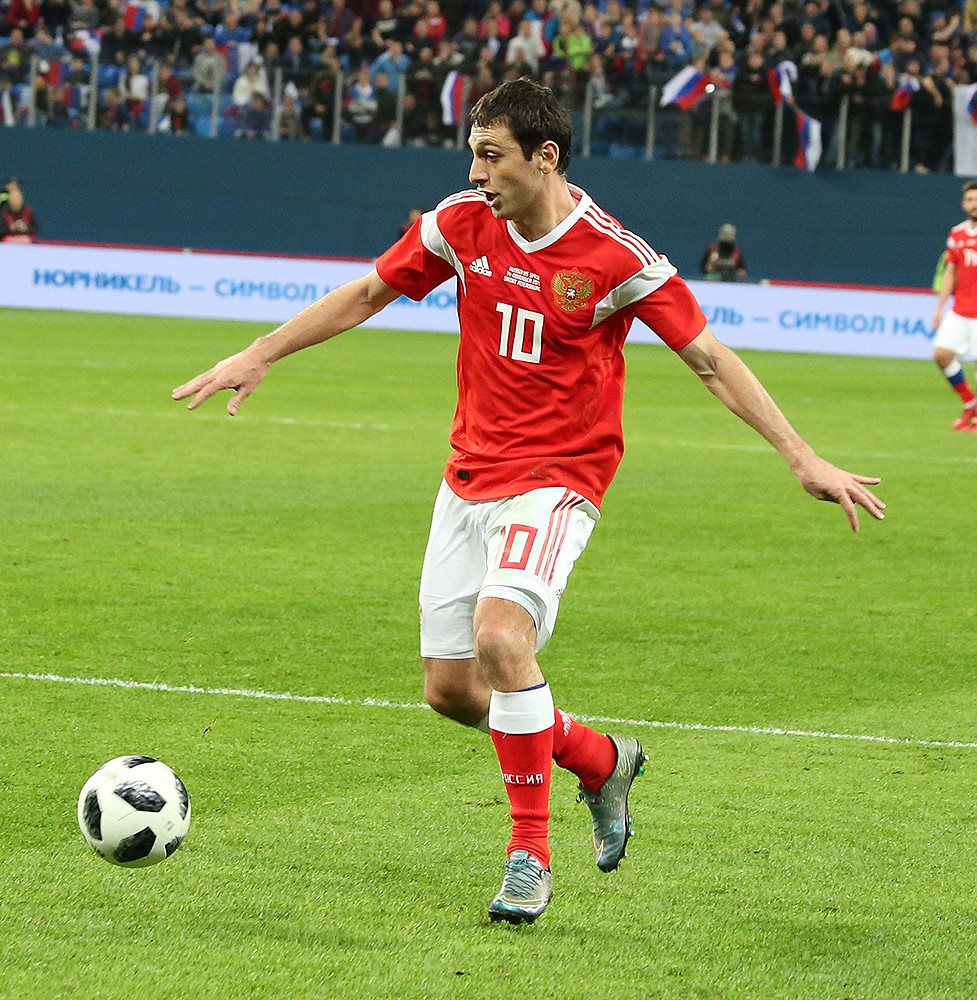
Dzagoev on international duty, facing Spain in 2017

National team	Year	Apps	Goals
Russia
Russia	2008	2	0
Russia	2009	3	0
Russia	2010	6	1
Russia	2011	6	3
Russia	2012	10	4
Russia	2013	2	0
Russia	2014	13	0
Russia	2015	6	1
Russia	2016	2	0
Russia	2017	3	0
Russia	2018	6	0
Total		59	9

International goals

Scores and results list Russia's goal tally first.

No.	Date	Venue	Opponent	Score	Result	Competition
1.	8 October 2010	Aviva Stadium, Dublin, Republic of Ireland	Republic of Ireland	2–0	3–2	UEFA Euro 2012 qualifying
2.	7 October 2011	Štadión pod Dubňom, Žilina, Slovakia	Slovakia	1–0	1–0	UEFA Euro 2012 qualifying
3.	11 October 2011	Luzhniki Stadium, Moscow, Russia	Andorra	1–0	6–0	UEFA Euro 2012 qualifying
4.	11 October 2011	Luzhniki Stadium, Moscow, Russia	Andorra	4–0	6–0	UEFA Euro 2012 qualifying
5.	8 June 2012	Stadion Miejski, Wrocław, Poland	Czech Republic	1–0	4–1	UEFA Euro 2012
6.	8 June 2012	Stadion Miejski, Wrocław, Poland	Czech Republic	3–1	4–1	UEFA Euro 2012
7.	12 June 2012	Stadion Narodowy, Warsaw, Poland	Poland	1–0	1–1	UEFA Euro 2012
8.	15 August 2012	Lokomotiv Stadium, Moscow, Russia	Ivory Coast	1–0	1–1	Friendly
9.	8 September 2015	Rheinpark Stadion, Vaduz, Liechtenstein	Liechtenstein	6–0	7–0	UEFA Euro 2016 qualifying

== Honours ==
CSKA Moscow

- Russian Premier League: 2012–13, 2013–14, 2015–16
- Russian Cup: 2007–08, 2008–09, 2010–11, 2012–13
- Russian Super Cup: 2009, 2013, 2018

Rubin Kazan

- Russian First League: 2022–23

Individual

- In the list of 33 best football players of the championship of Russia: 2008 (No. 3 Central Midfielder), 2009 (No. 2 Central Midfielder), 2011/12 (No. 2 Central Midfielder), 2012/13 (No. 1 Left Midfielder), 2013/14 (No. 3 Central Midfielder), 2014/2015 (No. 3 Left Midfielder), 2015/2016 (No. 1 Left Midfielder)
- Russian Premier League Best Young Player: 2008
- UEFA European Football Championship Top Goalscorer: 2012
- Member of symbolic team of UEFA European Under-21 Football Championship: 2013
- GQ Russia Men of The Year Awards - 2013
