= Yegor Ushakov =

Russian footballer (born 2002)

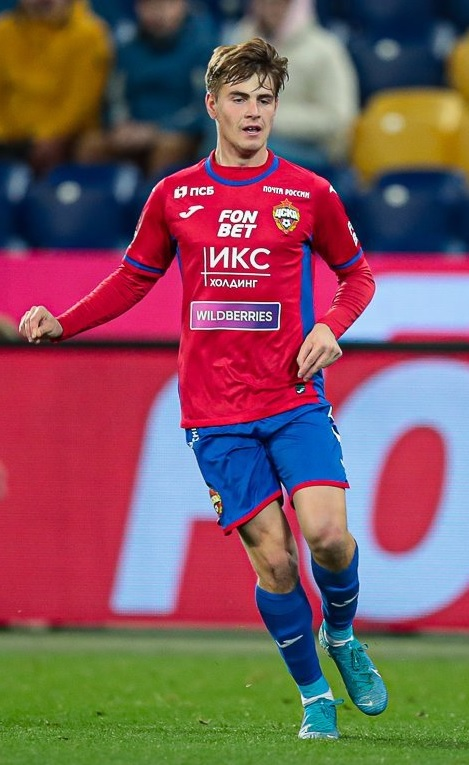
- Ushakov with CSKA in 2022

Personal information
- Full name: Yegor Sergeyevich Ushakov
- Date of birth: 2 December 2002 (age 23)
- Place of birth: Moscow, Russia
- Height: 1.76 m (5 ft 9 in)
- Position: Forward

Team information
- Current team: Rodina-2 Moscow
- Number: 41

Youth career
- –2020: Torpedo Moscow
- 2020–2022: CSKA Moscow

Senior career*
Years	Team	Apps	(Gls)
2022–2026	CSKA Moscow	11	(1)
2023–2024	→ Krylia Sovetov Samara (loan)	1	(0)
2026–	Rodina-2 Moscow	10	(5)

International career^{‡}
2019	Russia U-18	5	(0)
2021	Russia U-21	1	(0)
- * Club domestic league appearances and goals as of 15 November 2026 ‡ National team caps and goals as of 6 June 2021

Yegor Sergeyevich Ushakov (Russian: Егор Сергеевич Ушаков; born 2 December 2002) is a Russian football player who plays for Rodina-2 Moscow.

== Club career ==
He made his debut in the Russian Premier League for CSKA Moscow on 3 April 2022 in a game against Ural Yekaterinburg. He made his first start and scored his first goal in CSKA's next game on 9 April against Khimki.

On 20 May 2022, Ushakov signed a new four-year contract with CSKA.

On 13 September 2023, Ushakov joined Krylia Sovetov Samara on loan with an option to buy. The loan was terminated early in March 2024 due to Ushakov's injury.

In the 2024–25 season, Ushakov only appeared on the bench for CSKA following recovery from the injury, and in the 2025–26 season, he was not included in the matchday squad for any games despite being registered with the league. He left CSKA after his contract expired at the end of the 2025–26 season.

== Career statistics ==
As of match played 1 June 2025

Appearances and goals by club, season and competition
Club	Season	League			Cup		Total	
Club	Season	Division	Apps	Goals	Apps	Goals	Apps	Goals
CSKA Moscow	2021–22	Russian Premier League	7	1	1	0	8	1
CSKA Moscow	2022–23	Russian Premier League	4	0	1	0	5	0
CSKA Moscow	2024–25	Russian Premier League	0	0	0	0	0	0
CSKA Moscow	2025–26	Russian Premier League	0	0	0	0	0	0
CSKA Moscow	Total		11	1	2	0	13	1
Krylia Sovetov Samara (loan)	2023–24	Russian Premier League	1	0	1	0	2	0
Career total			12	1	2	0	14	1

== Personal life ==
In May 2026, Ushakov married actress Stasya Miloslavskaya.

== Honours ==
CSKA Moscow

- Russian Cup: 2022–23
