= Maksim Yeleyev =

Russian footballer

Personal information
- Full name: Maksim Igorevich Yeleyev
- Date of birth: 3 March 2001 (age 25)
- Height: 1.82 m (6 ft 0 in)
- Position: Defender

Senior career*
Years	Team	Apps	(Gls)
2018–2022	CSKA Moscow	0	(0)
2020–2021	→ Akron Tolyatti (loan)	22	(0)
2021	→ Yenisey Krasnoyarsk (loan)	1	(0)
2021	→ Amkar Perm (loan)	10	(0)
2022–2024	Metallurg Lipetsk	59	(6)
2024	Kompozit Pavlovsky Posad	13	(0)

International career^{‡}
2018–2019	Russia U18	5	(0)
- * Club domestic league appearances and goals as of 3 November 2024 ‡ National team caps and goals as of 24 March 2019

Maksim Igorevich Yeleyev (Russian: Максим Игоревич Елеев; born 3 March 2001) is a Russian footballer who plays as a right-back or right midfielder.

== Club career ==
He first appeared on the bench for the senior squad of CSKA Moscow on 15 September 2019 in a Russian Premier League game against Tambov. He was also included in CSKA's 2019–20 UEFA Europa League squad.

He made his debut for the main squad of CSKA Moscow on 25 September 2019 in a Russian Cup game against Alania Vladikavkaz, he started the game and played the whole match.

On 31 July 2020, Yeleyev signed a new contract with CSKA Moscow, until the summer of 2024, and moved to Akron Tolyatti on a season-long loan deal. He made his Russian Football National League debut for Akron on 1 August 2020 in a game against Fakel Voronezh. He became a regular starter for Akron after that. On 20 February 2021, the loan was terminated early.

On 22 January 2021, Yeleyev joined Yenisey Krasnoyarsk on a 1.5-year loan until the end of the 2021–22 season. During the summer of 2021, Yeleyevs loan deal with Yenisey Krasnoyarsk was cut short, with the defender moving to Amkar Perm on a season-long loan deal on 19 July 2021. On 22 February 2022, Yeleyev moved on a new loan to Tekstilshchik Ivanovo. However, the loan to Tekstilshchik fell through and Yeleyev was registered as a CSKA player and appeared on the bench in some games late in the 2021–22 season.

On 30 August 2022, Yeleyev moved to Metallurg Lipetsk on a permanent basis.

== Career statistics ==
As of 21 May 2022

Club	Season	League			Cup		Continental		Total	
Club	Season	Division	Apps	Goals	Apps	Goals	Apps	Goals	Apps	Goals
CSKA Moscow	2019–20	RPL	0	0	1	0	0	0	1	0
CSKA Moscow	2021–22	RPL	0	0	0	0	–		0	0
CSKA Moscow	Total		0	0	1	0	0	0	1	0
Akron Tolyatti (loan)	2020–21	FNL	22	0	0	0	–		22	0
Yenisey Krasnoyarsk (loan)	2020–21	FNL	1	0	–		–		1	0
Amkar Perm (loan)	2021–22	FNL 2	10	0	–		–		10	0
Career total			33	0	1	0	0	0	34	0
