= Gela Dzagoyev =

Russian footballer

Personal information
- Full name: Gela Yelizbarovich Dzagoyev
- Date of birth: 31 January 1988 (age 38)
- Place of birth: Vladikavkaz, North Ossetian ASSR, Russian SFSR, Soviet Union
- Height: 1.77 m (5 ft 10 in)
- Position: Defensive midfielder

Youth career
- Yunost Vladikavkaz
- FC Spartak Vladikavkaz

Senior career*
Years	Team	Apps	(Gls)
2005	FC Vladikavkaz (amateur)		
2005	FC Alania Vladikavkaz	0	(0)
2006	FC Spartak Vladikavkaz	0	(0)
2007–2008	FC Kolos Pavlovskaya		
2008	FC Chertanovo Moscow (amateur)		
2009	FC Zenit Moscow		
2009	FC KAMAZ Naberezhnye Chelny	1	(0)
2010	FC Beslan-FAYUR Beslan	1	(0)
2011	FC Alania-d Vladikavkaz	19	(2)
- * Club domestic league appearances and goals

Gela Yelizbarovich Dzagoyev (Russian: Гела Елизбарович Дзагоев; born 31 January 1988) is a Russian former professional footballer.

== Club career ==
He played in the Russian Football National League for FC KAMAZ Naberezhnye Chelny in 2009.

== Personal life ==
He is the older brother of Alan Dzagoyev.
