= Eduard Bagrintsev =

Armenian footballer

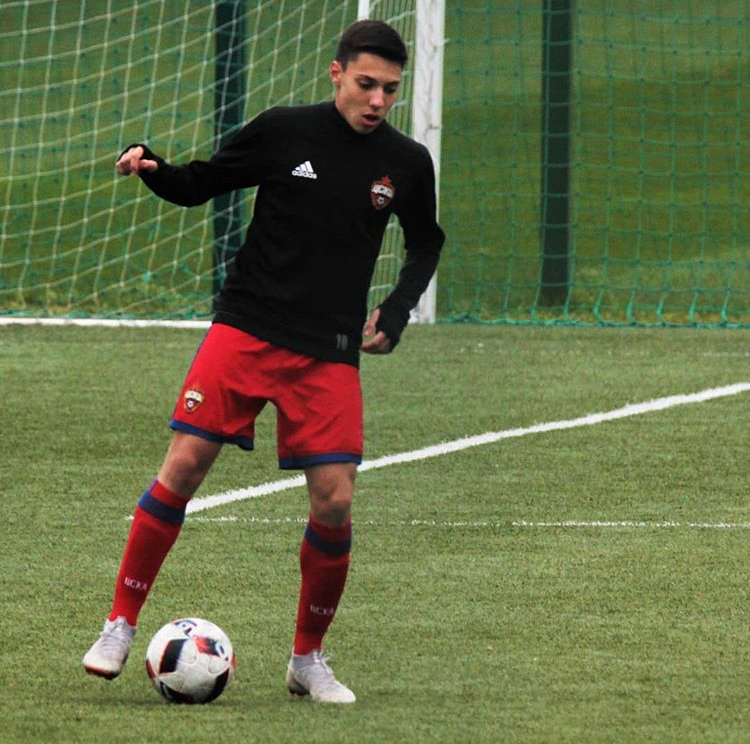
- Eduard Bagrintsev

Personal information
- Full name: Eduard Arturovich Bagrintsev
- Date of birth: 13 January 2003 (age 23)
- Place of birth: Sochi, Russia
- Height: 1.77 m (5 ft 10 in)
- Position: Forward

Youth career
- –2014: DYuSSh-8 Sochi
- 2014–2022: PFC CSKA Moscow

Senior career*
Years	Team	Apps	(Gls)
2021–2022	PFC CSKA Moscow	0	(0)
2022–2023	Dubnica	17	(2)
2023–2024	Krasnodar-2	40	(4)
2025	Kuban Krasnodar	17	(0)
2025	Znamya Truda	3	(0)

International career^{‡}
2018	Russia U15	7	(1)
2018–2019	Russia U16	14	(5)
2019–2020	Russia U17	7	(1)
2021–2022	Russia U19	3	(0)
2023	Armenia U21	4	(0)
- * Club domestic league appearances and goals as of 1 November 2025 ‡ National team caps and goals as of 21 November 2023

Eduard Arturovich Bagrintsev (Armenian: Էդուարդ Բագրինցև; Russian: Эдуард Артурович Багринцев; born 13 January 2003) is a professional football player who plays as a forward. Born in Russia, he is a youth international for Armenia.

== Club career ==
Bagrintsev made his debut for the main team of PFC CSKA Moscow on 23 September 2021 in a Russian Cup game against FC Zenit-Izhevsk.

On 1 September 2022, Bagrintsev moved to Dubnica in Slovakia. CSKA retained a buy-back option.

On 21 June 2023, Bagrintsev signed a three-year contract with Krasnodar and was assigned to the reserve team Krasnodar-2.

== International career ==
Bagrintsev was born in Russia and represented Russia on junior levels. His father is Armenian and his mother is half-Armenian. In April 2022, Bagrintsev announced that he switched his allegiance to Armenia and will represent the country as soon as he formally acquires citizenship.

== Career statistics ==
As of 21 May 2022

Club	Season	League			Cup		Continental		Other		Total	
Club	Season	Division	Apps	Goals	Apps	Goals	Apps	Goals	Apps	Goals	Apps	Goals
CSKA Moscow	2021–22	RPL	0	0	1	0	–		–		1	0
Career total			0	0	1	0	0	0	0	0	1	0
