= Said Tarba =

Georgian footballer

Personal information
- Date of birth: 15 October 1968 (age 58)
- Place of birth: Gudauta, Georgian SSR
- Height: 1.79 m (5 ft 10 1/2 in)
- Position: Defender

Senior career*
Years	Team	Apps	(Gls)
1985	FC Dinamo Sukhumi	15	(0)
1986	FC Dinamo Tbilisi	0	(0)
1987	FC Dinamo Sukhumi	23	(4)
1987–1989	FC Dinamo Tbilisi	2	(0)
1989–1991	FC Dinamo Sukhumi	79	(4)
1994	FC Ritsa Gudauta		
1995	FC Zhemchuzhina Sochi	20	(0)
1996	FC SKA Rostov-on-Don	4	(0)
- * Club domestic league appearances and goals

Said Tarba (born 15 October 1968) is a former Georgian football player.

== Personal life ==
His son Zaur Tarba is a professional footballer as well.
