= Zaur Tarba =

Russian footballer (born 2003)

Personal information
- Full name: Zaur Saidovich Tarba
- Date of birth: 14 May 2003 (age 23)
- Height: 1.79 m (5 ft 10 in)
- Position: Midfielder

Team information
- Current team: FC Ufa
- Number: 6

Youth career
- PFC CSKA Moscow

Senior career*
Years	Team	Apps	(Gls)
2022	PFC CSKA Moscow	1	(0)
2022–2024	FC Alania Vladikavkaz	54	(1)
2025–2026	FC Chernomorets Novorossiysk	37	(1)
2026–	FC Ufa	0	(0)
- * Club domestic league appearances and goals as of 16 May 2026

Zaur Saidovich Tarba (Russian: Заур Саидович Тарба; born 14 May 2003) is a Russian football player of Abkhazian descent who plays for FC Ufa.

== Club career ==
He made his debut in the Russian Premier League for PFC CSKA Moscow on 15 May 2022 in a game against FC Krasnodar.

On 18 August 2022, Tarba moved to FC Alania Vladikavkaz.

== Personal life ==
His father Said Tarba also played football professionally. His brother Lev Tarba plays for FC Nart Sukhum in Abkhazian Premier League.

== Career statistics ==
As of 21 May 2022

Club	Season	League			Cup		Continental		Total	
Club	Season	Division	Apps	Goals	Apps	Goals	Apps	Goals	Apps	Goals
CSKA Moscow	2021–22	RPL	1	0	0	0	–		1	0
Career total			1	0	0	0	0	0	1	0
