= Ruslan Daurov =

Russian footballer

Personal information
- Full name: Ruslan Muratovich Daurov
- Date of birth: 11 September 2002 (age 24)
- Place of birth: Vladikavkaz, Russia
- Height: 1.84 m (6 ft 0 in)
- Position: Defensive midfielder

Team information
- Current team: Alania Vladikavkaz
- Number: 17

Youth career
- –2019: Yunost Vladikavkaz
- 2019–2022: CSKA Moscow

Senior career*
Years	Team	Apps	(Gls)
2019	Spartak Vladikavkaz	2	(0)
2019–2022	CSKA Moscow	0	(0)
2022–2025	Alania Vladikavkaz	34	(1)
2022–2024	Alania-2 Vladikavkaz	12	(1)
2025–2026	Sokol Saratov	16	(0)
2026–	Alania Vladikavkaz	8	(2)
- * Club domestic league appearances and goals as of 15 November 2026

Ruslan Muratovich Daurov (Russian: Руслан Муратович Дауров; born 11 September 2002) is a Russian football player who plays as a defensive midfielder for Alania Vladikavkaz.

== Club career ==
He made his debut for the main team of PFC CSKA Moscow on 23 September 2021 in a Russian Cup game against FC Zenit-Izhevsk.

== Career statistics ==
As of 11 December 2021

Club	Season	League			Cup		Continental		Other		Total	
Club	Season	Division	Apps	Goals	Apps	Goals	Apps	Goals	Apps	Goals	Apps	Goals
Spartak Vladikavkaz	2019–20	PFL	2	0	0	0	–		–		2	0
CSKA Moscow	2021–22	RPL	0	0	1	0	–		–		1	0
Career total			2	0	1	0	0	0	0	0	3	0
