= 2021–22 PFC CSKA Moscow season =

CSKA Moscow
2021–22 season
- Chairman: Yevgeni Giner
- Manager: Aleksei Berezutski
- Stadium: VEB Arena
- Premier League: 5th
- Russian Cup: Quarterfinal vs Spartak Moscow
- Top goalscorer: League: Yusuf Yazıcı (8); All: Yusuf Yazıcı (8)
- Highest home attendance: 12,802 vs Rostov (21 May 2022)
- Lowest home attendance: 0 vs Arsenal Tula (11 December 2021)
- Average home league attendance: 5,904 (21 May 2022)
Home colours	Away colours	Third colours

The 2021–22 PFC CSKA Moscow season was the club's 111th season in existence and the 30th consecutive season in the top flight of Russian football. In addition to the domestic league, CSKA Moscow participate in this season's edition of the Russian Cup.

== Season events ==
On 15 June, Ivica Olić left his role as Head Coach of CSKA Moscow by mutual consent, with Aleksei Berezutski being made Acting Head Coach. A little over a month later, 19 July, Berezutski was confirmed as CSKA's new permanent head coach.

=== Summer Transfers ===
On 28 May, Maksim Mukhin became CSKA Moscow's first signing of the summer, penning a five-year contract after joining from Lokomotiv Moscow.

On 31 May, CSKA Moscow announced the signing of Anton Zabolotny from Sochi, on a contract until 2024.

On 1 July, CSKA Moscow announced that Nikita Kotin had left the club by mutual consent, whilst Vitaly Zhironkin joined Volgar Astrakhan on loan for the season the following day.

On 6 July, young midfielders Anton Krachkovsky, Sergei Pryakhin and Andrei Savinov all joined Kairat Moscow on loan for the season, whilst Krachkovsky also extended his contract with CSKA Moscow until May 2024 and Savinov extended his until May 2025.

On 9 July, Ilya Shkurin joined Dynamo Kyiv on a season-long loan deal.

On 13 July, Vadim Konyukhov signed a new contract with CSKA Moscow until the end of the 2024–25 season, and then joined Zvezda Perm on a season-long loan deal.

On 19 July, Maksim Yeleyev moved to Amkar Perm on loan for the season.

On 30 July, Arnór Sigurðsson joined to Venezia on loan for the season.

=== New Contracts ===
On 1 June, CSKA Moscow extended their contract with Tigran Avanesyan until the summer of 2026.

On 9 June, Ilya Pomazun extended his contract with CSKA Moscow until the summer of 2026, and then moved to Ural Yekaterinburg on loan for the season.

On 16 June, Gocha Gogrichiani extended his contract with CSKA Moscow for another year, until the summer of 2022, and then moved to Tekstilshchik Ivanovo on loan for the season.

On 17 June, CSKA Moscow announced that Ivan Lapshov and Artur Galoyan had joined their training camp in Austria on trial.

On 19 July, Kirill Nababkin signed a new one-year contract with CSKA after his previous contract had expired at the end of the 2020–21 season.

On 22 July, Alan Dzagoev signed a new two-year contract with CSKA after his previous contract had expired at the end of the 2020–21 season.

=== July ===
CSKA opened the season with a home fixture against FC Ufa on 25 July, which they won 1-0 thanks to a second half goal from debutante Anton Zabolotny.

On 30 July, CSKA hosted the first Moscow Derby of the season, against Lokomotiv Moscow. Kristijan Bistrović gave CSKA the lead from a free-kick in the 19th minute before Fyodor Smolov equalised three minutes later. On the hour mark Rifat Zhemaletdinov gave Lokomotiv the lead, which they would hold to the end, leaving CSKA with a 2–1 defeat.

=== August ===
On 4 August, CSKA confirmed that Nair Tiknizyan had left the club to join Lokomotiv Moscow.

On 8 August, CSKA travelled to the VTB Arena to face Dynamo Moscow. After Chidera Ejuke gave CSKA the lead in the 8th minute, CSKA held the lead until the 58th minute, when Jaka Bijol fouled Arsen Zakharyan in the area and Daniil Fomin stepped up to score the penalty. Fomin scored Dynamo's second in the 73 minute with Dynamo holding on to win 2–1.

On 14 August, CSKA played their second away game in a row, this time at the Rostov Arena against Rostov. Jaka Bijol opened the scoring in the 8th minute, with Fyodor Chalov doubling CSKA's advantage in the 36th. In the second half, Danil Glebov scored for Rostov in the 54th minute before Konstantin Maradishvili scored his first goal for CSKA in the 89th minute and secured all three points for CSKA.

On 21 August, CSKA hosted Akhmat Grozny at the VEB Arena. After Yevgeni Kharin was sent off for Akhmat Grozny in the first half, Vladislav Yakovlev gave CSKA the lead with his first goal for the club in the 71st minute. Chidera Ejuke doubled CSKA's lead four minutes later, with the game ending 2–0 to CSKA.

CSKA's last game of August took place on 26 August, away to Zenit St.Petersburg at the Krestovsky Stadium. A late strike from Sardar Azmoun saw Zenit run out 1-0 winners.

On 30 August, Argentine striker Adolfo Gaich left CSKA to sign for Huesca on a season-long loan deal, whilst the next day, 31 August, Nikola Vlašić left CSKA to sign permanently for West Ham United.

=== September ===
On 2 September, Konstantin Maradishvili left CSKA to sign for Lokomotiv Moscow.

On 7 September, Vadim Karpov, Tigran Avanesyan and Lassana N'Diaye all joined Tekstilshchik Ivanovo on season-long loan deals.

On 12 September, CSKA traveled to the Arsenal Stadium to face Arsenal Tula. Igor Diveyev gave CSKA the lead after 5 minutes, with Yevgeni Markov equalising for Arsenal Tula in the 18th minute. Ivan Novoseltsev gave Arsenal the lead in the 66th minute before Fyodor Chalov equalising for CSKA 8 minutes later, with the game ending in a 2–2 draw.

On 20 September, CSKA hosted Spartak Moscow in the Main Moscow derby, with Anton Zabolotny scoring the only goal of the game in the 81st minute, before being sentoff for two bookings in injury time.

On 27 September, CSKA travelled to the Nizhny Novgorod Stadium to face Nizhny Novgorod. Bakhtiyar Zaynutdinov gave CSKA the lead in the 31st minute, with Ilzat Akhmetov scoring a second half penalty to secure a 2–0 victory for CSKA.

=== October ===
On 2 October, CSKA hosted Krasnodar in a 0–0 draw, that left CSKA 6th in the league going into the International break.

CSKA returned to RPL action against Ural Yekaterinburg on 17 October, winning 1-0 thanks to Chidera Ejuke's third goal of the season.

On 23 October, CSKA hosted Krylia Sovetov, and after being 0-1 down at halftime after an Ivan Sergeyev goal, Chidera Ejuke equalised just before the hour mark. Fyodor Chalov and Anton Zabolotny then scored two late goals to ensure CSKA won the match 3–1.

On 30 October, CSKA traveled to the Ak Bars Arena in Kazan to face Rubin Kazan, Mikhail Kostyukov scoring a stoppage winner for the hosts to leave CSKA in 5th position after 13 games.

=== November ===
CSKA lost their second game in a row on 6 November, suffering a 4–1 defeat to Sochi at the Fisht Olympic Stadium. After being 3-0 down at half time, to goals from Artur Yusupov and a brace from Mateo Cassierra, Bakhtiyar Zaynutdinov pulled one goal back in the 57th minute before Igor Yurganov retorted Sochi's three goal advantage late on to secure the win.

On 8 November, Cédric Gogoua left CSKA by mutual consent.

On 21 November, CSKA hosted Khimki in their 15th round match of the Premier League at the VEB Arena. In the 15th minute Bruno Fuchs was shown a straight red card for a professional foul on Kemal Ademi inside the penalty box. Ademi missed the ensuing penalty, with the match end as a 0–0 draw.

On 28 November, CSKA lost 0–2 to Zenit St.Petersburg to end the month in 6th position after a month where they gained 1 point from a possible 9.

=== December ===
On 4 December, CSKA traveled to Samara to face Krylia Sovetov at the Solidarnost Arena. After a goalless first half, substitute Emil Bohinen popped up in the 75th minute to score the only goal of the match, and earn CSKA the three points.

On 11 December, CSKA played their final match before the winter break, beating Arsenal Tula 2-0 thanks to goals in each half from Anton Zabolotny, leaving CSKA 4th in the table at the break.

On 30 December, young forward Mikhail Zabotkin joined Albacete Balompié on loan for the remainder of the season, with the option for the move to be made permanent. Also on 30 December, Danila Bokov extended his contract with the club until the summer of 2023, and Vladislav Torop extended his contract until the summer of 2026.

=== January ===
On 12 January, midfielder Kristijan Bistrović joined Fatih Karagümrük on loan for the remainder of the season, with an option for the move to be made permanent.

On 17 January, CSKA announced the signing of Paraguayan midfielder Jesús Medina on a contract until the end of the 2024/25 season, after his New York City FC contract had expired. Two days later, 19 January, CSKA announced the signing of Yusuf Yazıcı on loan from Lille until the end of the season, with the option to make the transfer permanent.

On 26 January, Konstantin Kuchayev joined Rubin Kazan on loan for the remainder of the season, whilst Vitaly Zhironkin joined Kairat Moscow on loan for the remainder of the season the following day.

On 31 January, Emil Bohinen joined Salernitana on loan for the remainder of the season, with an option to make the move permanent at the end of the season.

=== February ===
On 1 February, Fyodor Chalov joined Basel on loan for the remainder of the season.

On 17 February, Lassana N'Diaye joined Arda Kardzhali on loan for the remainder of the season, with an option for the move to be made permanent.

On 18 February, CSKA announced the loan signing of Jorge Carrascal from River Plate until the end of the season.

On 21 February, CSKA announced the loan signing of Jean-Philippe Gbamin from Everton until the end of the season. The following day, 22 February, Viktor Vasin left the club to join Kairat on a permanent transfer, and Maksim Yeleyev joined Tekstilshchik Ivanovo for the remainder of the season.

On 23 February, CSKA were hit by sanctions from the United States Department of the Treasury as a reaction to the ongoing 2021–2022 Russo-Ukrainian crisis.

CSKA returned to RPL action on 26 February, defeating Spartak Moscow 2-0 at the Otkritie Arena, with goals from debutant Yusuf Yazıcı and Bakhtiyar Zaynutdinov.

On 27 February, Ilya Shkurin's loan to Dynamo Kyiv was cut short, and he joined Raków Częstochowa on loan for the remainder of the season, with an option to make the move permanent.

=== March ===
On 5 March, Yusuf Yazıcı scored an injury time winner to see CSKA defeat 10-man Nizhny Novgorod at the VEB Arena. Seven days later, 12 March, CSKA faced Lokomotiv Moscow at the RZD Arena for the fifth Moscow derby of the season. CSKA took the lead in the 39th minute through Yusuf Yazıcı scoring his third league goal in three games, before Wilson Isidor equalised just before half time. Mário Fernandes then scored his first goal of the season in stoppage time at the end of the match to secure CSKA's fifth league win in a row.

On 20 March, CSKA hosted Rubin Kazan at the VEB Arena. Yusuf Yazıcı gave CSKA an early lead, followed by goals from Jean-Philippe Gbamin, Jesús Medina and Jorge Carrascal saw CSKA 4-0 up inside 30 minutes, before Konstantin Kuchayev got one back for Rubin and Aleksandr Lomovitsky was sentoff for two bookable offences before half time. In the second half Yazıcı completed his Hattrick whilst Silvije Begić was also sentoff for two bookable offences, to see the game end 6-1 to CSKA over 9-man Rubin.

=== April ===
On 3 April, CSKA hosted Ural Yekaterinburg at the VEB Arena. Igor Diveyev opened the scoring after 3 minutes before a Jaka Bijol own goal levelled the scores after 7 minutes. Eric Bicfalvi then gave Ural the lead mid-way through the second half before an injury time Penalty from Yusuf Yazıcı rescued a point for CSKA. CSKA followed this draw up with a trip to the Arena Khimki where they were defeated 4-2 to by Khimki. CSKA held a 2-1 lead at half time after a goals from Yegor Ushakov and Yusuf Yazıcı cancelled out Ilya Sadygov's first half strike for Khimki. In the second half a brace from Aleksandr Rudenko and a goal from Besard Šabović gave Khimki the win. On 16 April, CSKA travelled to the BetBoom Arena to face Ufa, where a late goal from Mário Fernandes seemed to have giving CSKA the victory, before Aleksei Nikitin scored in injury time for Ufa to share the points. On 24 April, CSKA hosted rivals Dynamo Moscow at the VEB Arena, where a second-half goal from substitute Chidera Ejuke gave CSKA the victory.

=== May ===
On 1 May, CSKA travelled to the Akhmat-Arena to face Akhmat Grozny, where goals in the second half from Daniil Utkin and Bernard Berisha saw CSKA suffer a 2-0 defeat to leave them 4th in the table. On 7 May, CSKA host Sochi at the VEB Arena where an early first half goal from Artyom Makarchuk proved decisive in giving Sochi the win and extended the gap between the two teams to 5 points. On 15 May, CSKA travelled to Krasnodar, where a 1-0 defeat saw them drop to fifth in the table.

On 18 May, Mário Fernandes announced that he would be suspending his contract with CSKA following the last game of the season against Rostov on 21 May 2022, in order to spend some time in Brazil with his family and then return to CSKA when ready. He explained that he needs to spend some time in Brazil with the family, but he is not terminating the contract and will return to CSKA if he feels ready.

On 20 May, CSKA announced that Alan Dzagoev and Hörður Magnússon would both leave the club at the end of the season, whilst new contracts had been signed with Kirill Nababkin for an additional year, with Igor Akinfeev until the summer of 2024 and Yegor Ushakov until the summer of 2026. Additionally, CSKA announced the permanent signing of Jorge Carrascal from River Plate after a successful loan period.

CSKA ended the season on 21 May with a 4-0 victory over Rostov with the goals coming from Mário Fernandes, Jean-Philippe Gbamin, Ivan Oblyakov and Igor Diveyev, to see CSKA end the season in 5th position.

=== June ===
On 8 June, CSKA announced that Vladislav Yakovlev had extended his contract with the club until the summer of 2025. The following day, 9 June, CSKA announced that Tigran Avanesyan would join Baltika Kaliningrad for the upcoming season. On 10 June, CSKA announced that Ilzat Akhmetov, has left the club with the expiration of his contract.

== Squad ==
As of match played 21 May 2022

Number	Name	Nationality	Position	Date of birth (age)	Signed from	Signed in	Contract ends	Apps.	Goals
Goalkeepers
35	Igor Akinfeev	(Russia)	GK	8 April 1986 (aged 36)	Academy	2003	2024	705	0
45	Danila Bokov	(Russia)	GK	8 September 2002 (aged 19)	Academy	2021	2023	1	0
49	Vladislav Torop	(Russia)	GK	7 November 2003 (aged 18)	Academy	2019	2026	3	0
Defenders
2	Mário Fernandes	(Russia)	DF	19 September 1990 (aged 31)	Grêmio	2012	2024	329	11
3	Bruno Fuchs	(Brazil)	DF	1 April 1999 (aged 23)	Internacional	2020	2025	11	0
14	Kirill Nababkin	(Russia)	DF	8 September 1986 (aged 35)	Moscow	2010	2023	271	4
23	Hörður Magnússon	(Iceland)	DF	11 February 1993 (aged 29)	Bristol City	2018		93	5
42	Georgi Shchennikov	(Russia)	DF	27 April 1991 (aged 31)	Academy	2008	2023	361	10
48	Dmitry Kaptilovich	(Russia)	DF	22 February 2003 (aged 19)	Academy	2021		2	0
64	Aleksei Sukharev	(Russia)	DF	11 January 2003 (aged 19)	Avangard Kursk	2021		0	0
78	Igor Diveyev	(Russia)	DF	27 September 1999 (aged 22)	Ufa	2019	2024	106	9
Midfielders
6	Maksim Mukhin	(Russia)	MF	4 November 2001 (aged 20)	Lokomotiv Moscow	2021	2026	29	0
7	Ilzat Akhmetov	(Russia)	MF	31 December 1997 (aged 24)	Rubin Kazan	2018	2022	104	7
8	Jorge Carrascal	(Colombia)	MF	25 May 1998 (aged 23)	on loan from River Plate	2022	2022	13	1
10	Alan Dzagoev	(Russia)	MF	17 June 1990 (aged 31)	Krylia Sovetov-SOK Dimitrovgrad	2008	2023	397	77
19	Bakhtiyar Zaynutdinov	(Kazakhstan)	MF	2 April 1998 (aged 24)	Rostov	2020	2025	51	5
27	Jean-Philippe Gbamin	(Ivory Coast)	MF	25 September 1995 (aged 26)	on loan from Everton	2022	2022	13	2
28	Jesús Medina	(Paraguay)	MF	30 April 1997 (aged 25)	Unattached	2022	2025	12	1
29	Jaka Bijol	(Slovenia)	MF	5 February 1999 (aged 23)	Rudar Velenje	2018	2023	96	7
53	Zaur Tarba	(Russia)	MF	14 May 2003 (aged 19)	Academy	2021		1	0
75	Ruslan Daurov	(Russia)	MF	11 September 2002 (aged 19)	Spartak Vladikavkaz	2019		1	0
98	Ivan Oblyakov	(Russia)	MF	5 July 1998 (aged 23)	Ufa	2018	2023	134	9
Forwards
11	Chidera Ejuke	(Nigeria)	FW	2 January 1998 (aged 24)	SC Heerenveen	2020	2024	65	10
41	Yegor Ushakov	(Russia)	FW	2 December 2002 (aged 19)	Academy	2021	2026	8	1
46	Vladislav Yakovlev	(Russia)	FW	14 February 2002 (aged 20)	Academy	2021	2025	20	1
70	Eduard Bagrintsev	(Russia)	FW	13 January 2003 (aged 19)	Academy	2021		1	0
91	Anton Zabolotny	(Russia)	FW	13 June 1991 (aged 30)	Sochi	2021	2024	27	6
97	Yusuf Yazıcı	(Turkey)	FW	29 January 1997 (aged 25)	on loan from Lille	2022	2022	12	8
Away on loan
1	Ilya Pomazun	(Russia)	GK	16 August 1996 (aged 25)	Academy	2012	2026	9	0
9	Fyodor Chalov	(Russia)	FW	10 April 1998 (aged 24)	Academy	2015	2024	179	49
12	Lassana N'Diaye	(Mali)	FW	3 October 2000 (aged 21)	Guidars	2018	2023	0	0
17	Arnór Sigurðsson	(Iceland)	MF	15 May 1999 (aged 23)	IFK Norrköping	2018	2023	87	13
20	Konstantin Kuchayev	(Russia)	MF	18 March 1998 (aged 24)	Academy	2015	2024	115	9
21	Adolfo Gaich	(Argentina)	FW	26 February 1999 (aged 23)	San Lorenzo	2020	2025	19	1
25	Kristijan Bistrović	(Croatia)	MF	9 April 1998 (aged 24)	Slaven Belupo	2018	2025	96	8
53	Maksim Yeleyev	(Russia)	DF	3 March 2001 (aged 21)	Academy	2019	2024	1	0
59	Tigran Avanesyan	(Russia)	MF	13 April 2002 (aged 20)	Academy	2018	2026	0	0
62	Vadim Karpov	(Russia)	DF	14 July 2002 (aged 19)	Academy	2019	2025	33	1
81	Vitaly Zhironkin	(Russia)	FW	10 March 2000 (aged 22)	Academy	2018	2022	0	0
88	Emil Bohinen	(Norway)	MF	12 March 1999 (aged 23)	Stabæk	2021	2025	14	2
99	Ilya Shkurin	(Belarus)	FW	17 August 1999 (aged 22)	Dynamo Brest	2020	2024	19	3
	Vadim Konyukhov	(Russia)	DF	5 January 2002 (aged 20)	Academy	2021	2025	0	0
	Gocha Gogrichiani	(Russia)	MF	5 May 2000 (aged 22)	Rostov	2020	2022	0	0
	Sergei Pryakhin	(Russia)	MF	16 December 2002 (aged 19)	Academy	2021	2026	0	0
	Andrei Savinov	(Russia)	MF	14 May 2002 (aged 20)	Academy	2021	2025	0	0
	Mikhail Zabotkin	(Russia)	FW	17 April 2003 (aged 19)	Strogino Moscow	2021		0	0
Players who left during the season
5	Viktor Vasin	(Russia)	DF	6 October 1988 (aged 33)	Spartak Nalchik	2011		98	2
8	Nikola Vlašić	(Croatia)	MF	4 October 1997 (aged 24)	Everton	2019	2024	108	33
22	Konstantin Maradishvili	(Russia)	MF	7 February 2000 (aged 22)	Academy	2019	2025	49	1
27	Cédric Gogoua	(Ivory Coast)	DF	10 July 1994 (aged 27)	Tambov	2019	2023	5	1
71	Nair Tiknizyan	(Russia)	MF	12 May 1999 (aged 23)	Academy	2013	2025	43	2
	Anton Krachkovsky	(Russia)	MF	22 June 2002 (aged 19)	Academy	2021	2024	0	0

=== Out on loan ===
Note: Flags indicate national team as defined under FIFA eligibility rules; some limited exceptions apply. Players may hold more than one non-FIFA nationality.

No.	Pos.	Nation	Player
—	GK	RUS	Ilya Pomazun (at Ural Yekatrerinburg until end of 2021–22 season)
—	DF	RUS	Vadim Karpov (at Tekstilshchik Ivanovo until end of 2021–22 season)
—	DF	RUS	Vadim Konyukhov (at Zvezda Perm until end of 2021–22 season)
—	DF	RUS	Maksim Yeleyev (at Tekstilshchik Ivanovo until end of 2021–22 season)
—	MF	CRO	Kristijan Bistrović (at Fatih Karagümrük until end of 2021–22 season)
—	MF	ISL	Arnór Sigurðsson (at Venezia until end of 2021–22 season)
—	MF	NOR	Emil Bohinen (at Salernitana until end of 2021–22 season)
—	MF	RUS	Tigran Avanesyan (at Tekstilshchik Ivanovo until end of 2021–22 season)
—	MF	RUS	Gocha Gogrichiani (at Tekstilshchik Ivanovo until end of 2021–22 season)
—	MF	RUS	Konstantin Kuchayev (at Rubin Kazan until end of 2021–22 season)

No.	Pos.	Nation	Player
—	MF	RUS	Sergei Pryakhin (at Kairat Moscow until end of 2021–22 season)
—	MF	RUS	Andrei Savinov (at Kairat Moscow until end of 2021–22 season)
—	FW	ARG	Adolfo Gaich (at Huesca until end of 2021–22 season)
—	FW	BLR	Ilya Shkurin (at Raków Częstochowa until end of 2021–22 season)
—	MF	RUS	Mikhail Zabotkin (at Albacete Balompié until end of 2021–22 season)
—	FW	MLI	Lassana N'Diaye (at Arda Kardzhali until end of 2021–22 season)
—	FW	RUS	Fyodor Chalov (at Basel until end of 2021–22 season)
—	FW	RUS	Vitaly Zhironkin (at Kairat Moscow until end of 2021–22 season)

== Transfers ==
=== In ===
Date	Position	Nationality	Name	From	Fee	Ref.
28 May 2021	MF	(Russia)	Maksim Mukhin	Lokomotiv Moscow	Undisclosed	
31 May 2021	FW	(Russia)	Anton Zabolotny	Sochi	Undisclosed	
17 January 2022	MF	(Paraguay)	Jesús Medina	Unattached (Note: Previous club: New York City FC.)	Free	

=== Loans in ===
Date from	Position	Nationality	Name	From	Date to	Ref.
19 January 2022	FW	(Turkey)	Yusuf Yazıcı	Lille	End of season	
18 February 2022	MF	(Colombia)	Jorge Carrascal	River Plate	End of season	
21 February 2022	MF	(Ivory Coast)	Jean-Philippe Gbamin	Everton	End of season	

=== Out ===
Date	Position	Nationality	Name	To	Fee	Ref.
4 August 2021	MF	(Russia)	Nair Tiknizyan	Lokomotiv Moscow	Undisclosed	
31 August 2021	MF	(Croatia)	Nikola Vlašić	West Ham United	Undisclosed	
2 September 2021	MF	(Russia)	Konstantin Maradishvili	Lokomotiv Moscow	Undisclosed	
22 February 2022	DF	(Russia)	Viktor Vasin	Kairat	Undisclosed	
9 March 2022	MF	(Russia)	Anton Krachkovsky	CSKA Moscow	Undisclosed	

=== Loans out ===
Date from	Position	Nationality	Name	To	Date to	Ref.
9 June 2021	GK	(Russia)	Ilya Pomazun	Ural Yekaterinburg	End of season	
16 June 2021	MF	(Russia)	Gocha Gogrichiani	Tekstilshchik Ivanovo	End of season	
2 July 2021	FW	(Russia)	Vitaly Zhironkin	Volgar Astrakhan	27 January 2022	
6 July 2021	MF	(Russia)	Anton Krachkovsky	Kairat Moscow	9 March 2022	
6 July 2021	MF	(Russia)	Sergei Pryakhin	Kairat Moscow	End of season	
6 July 2021	MF	(Russia)	Andrei Savinov	Kairat Moscow	End of season	
9 July 2021	FW	(Belarus)	Ilya Shkurin	Dynamo Kyiv	27 February 2022	
13 July 2021	DF	(Russia)	Vadim Konyukhov	Zvezda Perm	End of season	
19 July 2021	DF	(Russia)	Maksim Yeleyev	Amkar Perm	7 February 2022	
30 July 2021	MF	(Iceland)	Arnór Sigurðsson	Venezia	End of season	
30 August 2021	FW	(Argentina)	Adolfo Gaich	Huesca	End of season	
7 September 2021	DF	(Russia)	Vadim Karpov	Tekstilshchik Ivanovo	End of season	
7 September 2021	MF	(Russia)	Tigran Avanesyan	Tekstilshchik Ivanovo	End of season	
7 September 2021	FW	(Mali)	Lassana N'Diaye	Tekstilshchik Ivanovo	3 February 2022	
30 December 2021	FW	(Russia)	Mikhail Zabotkin	Albacete Balompié	End of season	
12 January 2022	MF	(Croatia)	Kristijan Bistrović	Fatih Karagümrük	End of season	
26 January 2022	MF	(Russia)	Konstantin Kuchayev	Rubin Kazan	End of season	
27 January 2022	FW	(Russia)	Vitaly Zhironkin	Kairat Moscow	End of season	
31 January 2022	MF	(Norway)	Emil Bohinen	Salernitana	End of season	
1 February 2022	FW	(Russia)	Fyodor Chalov	Basel	End of season	
17 February 2022	FW	(Mali)	Lassana N'Diaye	Arda Kardzhali	End of season	
22 February 2022	DF	(Russia)	Maksim Yeleyev	Tekstilshchik Ivanovo	End of season	
27 February 2022	FW	(Belarus)	Ilya Shkurin	Raków Częstochowa	End of season	

=== Released ===
Date	Position	Nationality	Name	Joined	Date	Ref.
1 July 2021	DF	(Russia)	Nikita Kotin	Rostov	12 August 2021	
8 November 2021	DF	(Ivory Coast)	Cédric Gogoua	Turan	20 February 2022	
30 June 2022	DF	(Iceland)	Hörður Magnússon	Panathinaikos	9 July 2022	
30 June 2022	MF	(Russia)	Ilzat Akhmetov	Krasnodar	7 July 2022	
30 June 2022	MF	(Russia)	Alan Dzagoev	Rubin Kazan	2 September 2022	

=== Trial ===
Date From	Position	Nationality	Name	Date To	Last club	Ref.
17 June 2021	DF	(Russia)	Ivan Lapshov	Orenburg		
17 June 2021	MF	(Russia)	Artur Galoyan	Veles Moscow		

== Friendlies ==
23 June 2021	Wiener Neustadt (Austria)	1 – 3	(Russia) CSKA Moscow	Wiener Neustadt, Austria
18:30 MSK (UTC+3)	Onur 43'	Report	Chalov 49', 61'; Shkurin 79'

27 June 2021	KSV 1919 (Austria)	0 – 1	(Russia) CSKA Moscow	Austria
19:00 MSK (UTC+3)		Report		Stadium: Maradishvili 79'

5 July 2021	Copenhagen (Denmark)	1 – 0	(Russia) CSKA Moscow	Bad Tatzmannsdorf, Austria
19:00 MSK (UTC+3)	Højlund 31'	Report

9 July 2021	Admira Wacker Mödling (Austria)	0 – 1	(Russia) CSKA Moscow	Austria
18:00 MSK (UTC+3)		Report	Akhmetov 51'

13 July 2021	ViOn Zlaté Moravce (Slovakia)	0 – 2	(Russia) CSKA Moscow	Austria
19:00 MSK (UTC+3)		Report	Oblyakov 40'; Ejuke 65'

19 July 2021	CSKA Moscow	2 – 1	Nizhny Novgorod	Moscow
17:00 MSK (UTC+3)	Akhmetov 28', 85' (yellow card) 90'; Kuchayev (yellow card) 44'; Vasin (yellow card) 66'	Report	Sapeta 67' (pen.)	Stadium: VEB Arena

5 September 2021	CSKA Moscow	1 – 2	Lokomotiv Moscow	Moscow
17:00 MSK (UTC+3)	Akhmetov (yellow card) 77'; Bagrintsev 82'	Report	Kulikov 19'; Nenakhov (yellow card) 41'; Nikitin 65'	Stadium: VEB Arena

10 October 2021	CSKA Moscow	1 – 1	Nizhny Novgorod	Moscow
12:00 MSK (UTC+3)	Chalov 47' (penalty missed) 86'; Nababkin (yellow card) 80'	Report	Masoero (yellow card) 15'; Berkovski (yellow card) 38'; Kosarev 76'	Stadium: VEB Arena

14 November 2021	CSKA Moscow	3 – 1	Ufa	Moscow
13:00 MSK (UTC+3)	Bistrović (yellow card) 46'; Kuchayev (yellow card) 55' Chalov 62', 90'; Dzagoev 69' (pen.)	Report	Zhuravlyov (yellow card) 27'; Urunov (yellow card) 51' (goal) 57'	Stadium: VEB Arena

24 January 2022	CSKA Moscow (Russia)	0 – 1	(Luxembourg) F91 Dudelange	Dehesa de Campoamor, Spain
14:00 MSK (UTC+3)		Report	M.Kirch (yellow card) 10'; D.Sinani 14'

2 February 2022	CSKA Moscow (Russia)	3 – 2	(Denmark) Viborg	Dehesa de Campoamor, Spain
17:00 MSK (UTC+3)	Zabolotny 4', 20'; Medina 15'	Report	Bech 6'; Berger 53'; Lonwijk (yellow card) 59'

5 February 2022	CSKA Moscow (Russia)	1 – 0	(Denmark) Nordsjælland	Dehesa de Campoamor, Spain
17:00 MSK (UTC+3)	Nababkin 58'	Report

9 February 2022	CSKA Moscow (Russia)	3 – 2	(Denmark) Lyngby	Dehesa de Campoamor, Spain
14:00 MSK (UTC+3)	Oblyakov 26'; Zabolotny 43'; Yakovlev 89'	Report	Sørensen (yellow card) 28' (goal) 31'; Medina 54' (o.g.)

16 February 2022	CSKA Moscow (Russia)	3 – 0	(Spain) Real Murcia	Dehesa de Campoamor, Spain
17:00 MSK (UTC+3)	Zabolotny (yellow card) 35' (goal) 60'; Diveyev 67'; Yakovlev 84'	Report

20 February 2022	Rubin Kazan	1 – 1	CSKA Moscow	Turkey
15:00 MSK (UTC+3)	Uremović (yellow card) 15'; Hakšabanović 88'	Report	Carrascal (yellow card) 6' (red card) 33'; Diveyev 17'; Oblyakov (yellow card) 28'

26 March 2022	CSKA Moscow	2 – 0	Nizhny Novgorod	Moscow
12:00 MSK (UTC+3)	Tarba (yellow card) 65'; Yakovlev 68', 71'; Yeleyev (yellow card) 74'; Lukin (yellow card) 85'	Report	Gotsuk (yellow card) 15'; Kakkoyev (yellow card) 72'; Karasyov (yellow card) 79'	Stadium: VEB Arena

== Competitions ==
=== Overview ===
Competition	First match	Last match	Starting round	Final position	Record							
Competition	First match	Last match	Starting round	Final position	Pld	W	D	L	GF	GA	GD	Win %
Premier League	25 July 2021	21 May 2022	Matchday 1	5th	30	15	5	10	42	29	+13	50.00
Russian Cup	23 September 2021	20 April 2022	Round of 32	Quarterfinal	4	3	0	1	8	2	+6	75.00
Total					34	18	5	11	50	31	+19	52.94

Last updated: 21 May 2022
Source: See Results

=== Premier League ===
==== League table ====
Pos	Team	Pld	W	D	L	GF	GA	GD	Pts
3	Dynamo Moscow	30	16	5	9	53	41	+12	53
4	Krasnodar	30	14	8	8	42	30	+12	50 (Note: Head-to-head points: Krasnodar 4, CSKA Moscow 1.)
5	CSKA Moscow	30	15	5	10	42	29	+13	50
6	Lokomotiv Moscow	30	13	9	8	43	39	+4	48
7	Akhmat Grozny	30	13	3	14	36	38	−2	42

Source: Premier Liga
Rules for classification: 1) Points; 2) Head-to-head points; 3) Head-to-head matches won; 4) Head-to-head goal difference; 5) Head-to-head goals scored; 6) Matches won; 7) Goal difference; 8) Goals scored; 9) 2020–21 position (not applicable to final standings); 10) Play-off.

==== Results summary ====
Overall								Home						Away					
Pld	W	D	L	GF	GA	GD	Pts	W	D	L	GF	GA	GD	W	D	L	GF	GA	GD
30	15	5	10	42	29	+13	50	9	3	3	24	9	+15	6	2	7	18	20	−2

Last updated: 21 May 2022.
Source: See Results

==== Results by round ====
Round	1	2	3	4	5	6	7	8	9	10	11	12	13	14	15	16	17	18	19	20	21	22	23	24	25	26	27	28	29	30
Ground	H	H	A	A	H	A	A	H	A	H	A	H	А	H	Н	H	А	H	A	H	A	H	H	A	A	H	A	H	A	H
Result	W	L	L	W	W	L	D	W	W	D	W	W	L	L	D	L	W	W	W	W	W	W	D	L	D	W	L	L	L	W
Position	6	8	10	8	6	6	7	7	5	6	4	3	5	5	6	6	5	4	4	4	3	3	3	3	3	3	4	4	5	5

Updated to match(es) played on 21 May 2022. Source: See Results
A = Away; H = Home; W = Win; D = Draw; L = Loss

==== Results ====
25 July 2021 1	CSKA Moscow	1 – 0	Ufa	Moscow
20:00 MSK (UTC+3)	Zabolotny 61'	Report		Stadium: VEB Arena; Attendance: 938; Referee: Sergey Ivanov

31 July 2021 2	CSKA Moscow	1 – 2	Lokomotiv Moscow	Moscow
17:30 MSK (UTC+3)	Bistrović 19'; Mukhin (yellow card) 23'; Tiknizyan (yellow card) 58'; Oblyakov (yellow card) 90+'	Report	Smolov 22'; Barinov (yellow card) 30'; Murilo (yellow card) 31'; Kulikov (yellow card) 43'; Zhemaletdinov 60'	Stadium: VEB Arena; Attendance: 1,980; Referee: Alexey Matyunin

8 August 2021 3	Dynamo Moscow	2 – 1	CSKA Moscow	Moscow
20:00 MSK (UTC+3)	Fomin (yellow card) 21' (goal) 58' (pen.), 73'; Zakharyan (yellow card) 45+3'; Laxalt (yellow card) 72'	Report	Ejuke 8'; Bijol (yellow card) 57'	Stadium: VTB Arena; Attendance: 2,438; Referee: Vladislav Bezborodov

14 August 2021 4	Rostov	1 – 3	CSKA Moscow	Rostov-on-Don
20:00 MSK (UTC+3)	Glebov 54'; Terentyev (yellow card) 90+3'	Report	Bijol 8'; Chalov 36'; Bohinen (yellow card) 78'; Maradishvili 89'	Stadium: Rostov Arena; Attendance: 0 Referee: Kirill Levnikov

21 August 2021 5	CSKA Moscow	2 – 0	Akhmat Grozny	Moscow
18:00 MSK (UTC+3)	Fernandes (yellow card) 18'; Mukhin (yellow card) 28'; Maradishvili (yellow card) 68'; Yakovlev 71'; Ejuke 75'	Report	Kharin (yellow card) 13' (yellow-red card) 23'; Berisha (yellow card) 28'	Stadium: VEB Arena; Attendance: 1,915; Referee: Sergei Karasev

26 August 2021 6	Zenit St.Petersburg	1 – 0	CSKA Moscow	Saint Petersburg
20:45 MSK (UTC+3)	Malcom (yellow card) 78'; Azmoun 82'	Report	Dzagoev (yellow card) 21'; Mukhin (yellow card) 49'	Stadium: Krestovsky Stadium; Attendance: 998; Referee: Sergey Ivanov

12 September 2021 7	Arsenal Tula	2 – 2	CSKA Moscow	Tula
MSK (UTC+3)	Markov 18'; Kostadinov (yellow card) 45+2'; Kochenkov (yellow card) 45+4'; Novoseltsev 66', (yellow card) 84'	Report	Diveyev 5', (yellow card) 62'; Kuchayev (yellow card) 17'; Mukhin (yellow card) 57'; Chalov 74'	Stadium: Arsenal Stadium; Attendance: Ivan Sidenkov; Referee: 4,650

20 September 2021 8	CSKA Moscow	1 – 0	Spartak Moscow	Moscow
19:30 MSK (UTC+3)	Zabolotny (yellow card) 43' (yellow-red card) 90+1', (goal) 81'; Bohinen (yellow card) 71'; Oblyakov (yellow card) 75'	Report	Umyarov (yellow card) 53'	Stadium: VEB Arena; Attendance: 9,023; Referee: Sergei Karasev

27 September 2021 9	Nizhny Novgorod	0 – 2	CSKA Moscow	Nizhny Novgorod
19:00 MSK (UTC+3)	Tkachuk (yellow card) 29'; Balaj (yellow card) 38'; Gotsuk (yellow card) 85'	Report	Zaynutdinov 31'; Akhmetov 63' (pen.)	Stadium: Nizhny Novgorod Stadium; Attendance: 2,996; Referee: Kirill Levnikov

2 October 2021 10	CSKA Moscow	0 – 0	Krasnodar	Moscow
19:00 MSK (UTC+3)	Oblyakov (yellow card) 26'; Yakovlev (yellow card) 76'	Report	Ramírez (yellow card) 60'; Vilhena (yellow card) 82'	Stadium: VEB Arena; Attendance: 7,448; Referee: Vladimir Moskalyov

17 October 2021 11	Ural Yekaterinburg	0 – 1	CSKA Moscow	Yekaterinburg
14:00 MSK (UTC+3)	Goglichidze (yellow card) 62'	Report	Ejuke 52'	Stadium: Central Stadium; Attendance: 487; Referee: Artyom Lyubimov

23 October 2021 12	CSKA Moscow	3 – 1	Krylia Sovetov	Moscow
19:00 MSK (UTC+3)	Mukhin (yellow card) 6'; Ejuke 57'; Chalov 85'; Zabolotny 89'	Report	Sergeyev 11'; Prutsev (yellow card) 60'; Begić (yellow card) 73'	Stadium: VEB Arena; Attendance: 6,375; Referee: Vitali Meshkov

30 October 2021 13	Rubin Kazan	1 – 0	CSKA Moscow	Kazan
14:00 MSK (UTC+3)	Kvaratskhelia (yellow card) 37'; Kostyukov 90+'; Dyupin (yellow card) 90+'	Report	Mukhin (yellow card) 29'; Zabolotny (yellow card) 54'; Zaynutdinov (yellow card) 67'; Nababkin (yellow card) 87'	Stadium: Ak Bars Arena; Attendance: 5,203; Referee: Vladislav Bezborodov

6 November 2021 14	Sochi	4 – 1	CSKA Moscow	Sochi
19:00 MSK (UTC+3)	Zaika (yellow card) 3'; Yusupov 4'; Cassierra 14', 16'; Yurganov 87'	Report	Zaynutdinov 57'	Stadium: Fisht Olympic Stadium; Attendance: 7,628; Referee: Sergey Ivanov

21 November 2021 15	CSKA Moscow	0 – 0	Khimki	Moscow
14:00 MSK (UTC+3)	Dzagoev (yellow card) 8'; Fuchs (red card) 15'; Fernandes (yellow card) 57'	Report	Ademi (penalty missed) 17'; Dagerstål (yellow card) 38'; Mirzov (yellow card) 42'; Nabiullin (yellow card) 51'; Bozhenov (yellow card) 54'; Šabović (yellow card) 80'; Tikhy (yellow card) 90+'	Stadium: VEB Arena; Attendance: 4,240; Referee: Vladislav Bezborodov

28 November 2021 16	CSKA Moscow	0 – 2	Zenit St.Petersburg	Moscow
20:00 MSK (UTC+3)	Zaynutdinov (yellow card) 20'	Report	Claudinho 34'; Azmoun (yellow card) 63'; Mostovoy 90+'	Stadium: VEB Arena; Attendance: 7,993; Referee: Vladislav Bezborodov

4 December 2021 17	Krylia Sovetov	0 – 1	CSKA Moscow	Samara
14:00 MSK (UTC+3)	Chernov (yellow card) 83'	Report	Mukhin (yellow card) 60'; Bohinen 75'; Ejuke (yellow card) 89'	Stadium: Solidarnost Arena; Attendance: 5,918; Referee: Vladimir Moskalyov

11 December 2021 18	CSKA Moscow	2 – 0	Arsenal Tula	Moscow
16:30 MSK (UTC+3)	Zabolotny 33', 76' (pen.); Diveyev (yellow card) 69'; Akhmetov (yellow card) 80'	Report	Belyayev (yellow card) 49'; Radaković (yellow card) 75'	Stadium: VEB Arena; Attendance: 0 Referee: Igor Panin
Note: Match played behind closed doors.

26 February 2022 19	Spartak Moscow	0 – 2	CSKA Moscow	Moscow
19:00 MSK (UTC+3)	Umyarov (yellow card) 40'; Moses (yellow card) 90+6'	Report	Fernandes (yellow card) 24'; Carrascal (yellow card) 30'; Yazıcı 49'; Zaynutdinov 79'; Ejuke (yellow card) 83'	Stadium: Otkritie Arena; Attendance: 10,961; Referee: Vitali Meshkov

5 March 2022 20	CSKA Moscow	1 – 0	Nizhny Novgorod	Moscow
MSK (UTC+3)	Carrascal (yellow card) 44'; Yazıcı (yellow card) 60' (goal) 90+6'	Report	Larsen (yellow card) 31'; Kecskés (red card) 42'	Stadium: VEB Arena; Attendance: 5,609; Referee: Pavel Kukuyan

12 March 2022 21	Lokomotiv Moscow	1 – 2	CSKA Moscow	Moscow
19:00 MSK (UTC+3)	Isidor 42'; Zhemaletdinov (yellow card) 77'	Report	Zaynutdinov (yellow card) 31'; Yazıcı 39'; Gbamin (yellow card) 41'; Dzagoev (yellow card) 89'; Fernandes 90+1'	Stadium: RZD Arena; Attendance: 11,178; Referee: Sergey Ivanov

20 March 2022 22	CSKA Moscow	6 – 1	Rubin Kazan	Moscow
14:00 MSK (UTC+3)	Yazıcı 5', 67', 86' (pen.); Gbamin 11'; Shchennikov (yellow card) 15'; Medina 24'; Carrascal 26'; Oblyakov (yellow card) 34'; Zaynutdinov (yellow card) 58'	Report	Lomovitsky (yellow card) 21' (yellow-red card) 44'; Begić (yellow card) 26' (yellow-red card) 85'; Kuchayev 38'; Fattakhov (yellow card) 78'	Stadium: VEB Arena; Attendance: 12,042; Referee: Kirill Levnikov

3 April 2022 23	CSKA Moscow	2 – 2	Ural Yekaterinburg	Moscow
16:30 MSK (UTC+3)	Diveyev 3'; Gbamin (yellow card) 66'; Yazıcı 90+'	Report	Kuzmichyov (yellow card) 3'; Bijol 7' (o.g.); Yegorychev (yellow card) 36'; Bicfalvi 55'	Stadium: VEB Arena; Attendance: 9,588; Referee: Igor Panin

9 April 2022 24	Khimki	4 – 2	CSKA Moscow	Khimki
14:00 MSK (UTC+3)	Sadygov 9'; Rudenko (yellow card) 20' (goal) 54', 86'; Grigalava (yellow card) 42'; Šabović 80'	Report	Ushakov 32'; Yazıcı 44' (pen.); Carrascal (yellow card) 68'	Stadium: Arena Khimki; Attendance: 5,520; Referee: Pavel Kukuyan

16 April 2022 25	Ufa	1 – 1	CSKA Moscow	Ufa
14:00 MSK (UTC+3)	Jokić (yellow card) 19'; Ortiz (yellow card) 60'; Nikitin 90+'	Report	Shchennikov (yellow card) 55'; Fernandes 88'	Stadium: BetBoom Arena; Attendance: 8,877; Referee: Evgeny Turbin

24 April 2022 26	CSKA	1 – 0	Dynamo Moscow	Moscow
19:30 MSK (UTC+3)	Ejuke 67'; Gbamin (yellow card) 89'; Fernandes (yellow card) 90+'	Report	Laxalt (yellow card) 38'; Yevgenyev (yellow card) 86'	Stadium: VEB Arena; Attendance: 13,321; Referee: Sergei Karasev

1 May 2022 27	Akhmat Grozny	2 – 0	CSKA Moscow	Grozny
19:00 MSK (UTC+3)	Sadulayev (yellow card) 45+'; Utkin 46'; Semyonov (yellow card) 63'; Berisha 90+'; Bystrov (yellow card) 90+'	Report	Yazıcı (yellow card) 38'	Stadium: Akhmat-Arena; Attendance: 5,161; Referee: Vitali Meshkov

7 May 2022 28	CSKA Moscow	0 – 1	Sochi	Moscow
19:00 MSK (UTC+3)	Gbamin (yellow card) 36'; Akhmetov (red card) 90+'	Report	Makarchuk 10'; Popov (yellow card) 27'; Adamov (yellow card) 56'; Drkušić (yellow card) 57'; Prokhin (yellow card) 88'; Burmistrov (yellow card) 90+'	Stadium: VEB Arena; Attendance: 11,192; Referee: Vladislav Bezborodov

15 May 2022 29	Krasnodar	1 – 0	CSKA Moscow	Krasnodar
19:00 MSK (UTC+3)	Krivtsov (yellow card) 20' (goal) 75'; Pivovarov (yellow card) 90+'	Report	Shchennikov (yellow card) 33'; Ushakov (yellow card) 34'; Carrascal (yellow card) 45+'	Stadium: Krasnodar Stadium; Attendance: 24,485; Referee: Vladimir Moskalyov

21 May 2022 30	CSKA Moscow	4 – 0	Rostov	Moscow
17:00 MSK (UTC+3)	Fernandes 4' (yellow card) 56'; Gbamin 10'; Oblyakov 52'; Diveyev 87'	Report		Stadium: VEB Arena; Attendance: 12,802; Referee: Yan Bobrovsky

=== Russian Cup ===
==== Round of 32 ====
Pos	Team	Pld	W	D	L	GF	GA	GD	Pts	Qualification
1	CSKA Moscow	2	2	0	0	6	0	+6	6	Advance to Play-off
2	Lipetsk	2	1	0	1	2	3	−1	3	
3	Zenit-Izhevsk	2	0	0	2	1	6	−5	0	

Updated to match(es) played on 26 October 2021. Source:

23 September 2021 2	Zenit-Izhevsk	0 – 4	CSKA Moscow	Izhevsk
14:15 MSK (UTC+3)	Myrzakov (yellow card) 18'; Latsevich (yellow card) 64'; Farrakhov (yellow card) 79'	Report	Akhmetov 9'; Kuchayev 24' (yellow card) 57'; Zaynutdinov 76'; Zabolotny 90+1'	Stadium: Central Republican Stadium; Referee: A.Smolin

27 October 2021 3	Lipetsk	0 – 2	CSKA Moscow	Lipetsk
17:00 MSK (UTC+3)	Voydel (yellow card) 46'; Yakovlev (yellow card) 50'; Zavezyon (yellow card) 86'; Redkovich (yellow card) 90'	Report	Bohinen 41'; Bistrović 85'	Stadium: Metallurg Stadium; Referee: R.Galimov

==== Knockout stage ====
2 March 2022 Round of 16	Sochi	1 – 2	CSKA Moscow	Sochi
19:00 MSK (UTC+3)	Margasov (yellow card) 7'; Noboa 41'; Terekhov (yellow card) 70'; Prokhin (yellow card) 75'; Popov (yellow card) 77'	Report	Akinfeev (yellow card) 39'; Diveyev 60', 87'; Mukhin (yellow card) 90'	Stadium: Fisht Olympic Stadium; Referee: Sergey Ivanov

20 April 2022 Quarterfinal	CSKA Moscow	0 – 1	Spartak Moscow	Moscow
19:30 MSK (UTC+3)	Carrascal (yellow card) 24'; Gbamin (yellow card) 36' (yellow-red card) 45+3'; Mukhin (yellow card) 37'; Zabolotny (yellow card) 68'; Shchennikov (yellow card) 78'; Fuchs (yellow card) 90+3'	Report	Bakayev 21' (pen.) (yellow card) 32'; Martins (yellow card) 43'; Caufriez (yellow card) 45+1'; Nicholson (yellow card) 78'; Sobolev (yellow card) 87'; Gigot (yellow card) 90+4'; Maksimenko (yellow card) 90+5'	Stadium: VEB Arena; Referee: Vladimir Moskalyov

== Squad statistics ==
As of match played 21 May 2022

=== Appearances and goals ===
No.	Pos	Nat	Player	Total		Premier League		Russian Cup	
No.	Pos	Nat	Player	Apps	Goals	Apps	Goals	Apps	Goals
2	DF	(Russia) RUS	Mário Fernandes	30	3	28	3	2	0
3	DF	(Brazil) BRA	Bruno Fuchs	10	0	3+4	0	1+2	0
6	MF	(Russia) RUS	Maksim Mukhin	28	0	22+3	0	2+1	0
7	MF	(Russia) RUS	Ilzat Akhmetov	22	2	11+9	1	1+1	1
8	MF	(Colombia) COL	Jorge Carrascal	13	1	11	1	2	0
10	MF	(Russia) RUS	Alan Dzagoev	22	0	7+13	0	1+1	0
11	FW	(Nigeria) NGR	Chidera Ejuke	31	5	20+9	5	0+2	0
14	DF	(Russia) RUS	Kirill Nababkin	18	0	8+7	0	2+1	0
19	MF	(Kazakhstan) KAZ	Bakhtiyar Zaynutdinov	26	4	16+6	3	1+3	1
23	DF	(Iceland) ISL	Hörður Magnússon	4	0	2+2	0	0	0
27	MF	(Ivory Coast) CIV	Jean-Philippe Gbamin	13	2	11	2	2	0
28	MF	(Paraguay) PAR	Jesús Medina	12	1	8+2	1	1+1	0
29	MF	(Slovenia) SLO	Jaka Bijol	30	1	27+1	1	2	0
35	GK	(Russia) RUS	Igor Akinfeev	31	0	29	0	2	0
41	FW	(Russia) RUS	Yegor Ushakov	8	1	2+5	1	0+1	0
42	DF	(Russia) RUS	Georgi Shchennikov	16	0	12+2	0	2	0
45	GK	(Russia) RUS	Danila Bokov	1	0	0	0	0+1	0
46	FW	(Russia) RUS	Vladislav Yakovlev	16	1	1+13	1	2	0
48	DF	(Russia) RUS	Dmitry Kaptilovich	2	0	0	0	2	0
49	GK	(Russia) RUS	Vladislav Torop	3	0	1	0	2	0
53	MF	(Russia) RUS	Zaur Tarba	1	0	1	0	0	0
70	FW	(Russia) RUS	Eduard Bagrintsev	1	0	0	0	1	0
75	MF	(Russia) RUS	Ruslan Daurov	1	0	0	0	1	0
78	DF	(Russia) RUS	Igor Diveyev	29	5	27	3	2	2
91	FW	(Russia) RUS	Anton Zabolotny	27	6	21+3	5	1+2	1
97	FW	(Turkey) TUR	Yusuf Yazıcı	12	8	10	8	2	0
98	MF	(Russia) RUS	Ivan Oblyakov	32	1	29	1	2+1	0
Players away from the club on loan:
9	FW	(Russia) RUS	Fyodor Chalov	18	3	11+5	3	1+1	0
20	MF	(Russia) RUS	Konstantin Kuchayev	15	1	2+11	0	2	1
21	FW	(Argentina) ARG	Adolfo Gaich	1	0	0+1	0	0	0
25	MF	(Croatia) CRO	Kristijan Bistrović	8	2	1+5	1	2	1
88	MF	(Norway) NOR	Emil Bohinen	10	2	2+6	1	2	1
Players who left CSKA Moscow during the season:
5	DF	(Russia) RUS	Viktor Vasin	6	0	3+2	0	1	0
8	MF	(Croatia) CRO	Nikola Vlašić	5	0	3+2	0	0	0
22	MF	(Russia) RUS	Konstantin Maradishvili	3	1	0+3	1	0	0
71	MF	(Russia) RUS	Nair Tiknizyan	1	0	1	0	0	0

=== Goal scorers ===
Place	Position	Nation	Number	Name	Premier League	Russian Cup	Total
1	FW	(Turkey)	97	Yusuf Yazıcı	8	0	8
2	FW	(Russia)	91	Anton Zabolotny	5	1	6
3	FW	(Nigeria)	11	Chidera Ejuke	5	0	5
3	DF	(Russia)	78	Igor Diveyev	3	2	5
5	MF	(Kazakhstan)	19	Bakhtiyar Zaynutdinov	3	1	4
6	FW	(Russia)	9	Fyodor Chalov	3	0	3
6	DF	(Russia)	2	Mário Fernandes	3	0	3
6	MF	(Ivory Coast)	27	Jean-Philippe Gbamin	2	0	2
9	MF	(Russia)	7	Ilzat Akhmetov	1	1	2
9	MF	(Croatia)	25	Kristijan Bistrović	1	1	2
9	MF	(Norway)	88	Emil Bohinen	1	1	2
12	FM	(Slovenia)	29	Jaka Bijol	1	0	1
12	MF	(Russia)	22	Konstantin Maradishvili	1	0	1
12	FW	(Russia)	46	Vladislav Yakovlev	1	0	1
12	MF	(Paraguay)	28	Jesús Medina	1	0	1
12	MF	(Colombia)	8	Jorge Carrascal	1	0	1
12	FW	(Russia)	41	Yegor Ushakov	1	0	1
12	MF	(Russia)	98	Ivan Oblyakov	1	0	1
12	MF	(Russia)	20	Konstantin Kuchayev	0	1	1
				TOTALS	42	8	50

=== Clean sheets ===
Place	Position	Nation	Number	Name	Premier League	Russian Cup	Total
1	GK	(Russia)	35	Igor Akinfeev	13	0	13
2	GK	(Russia)	49	Vladislav Torop	0	2	2
3	GK	(Russia)	45	Danila Bokov	0	1	1
				TOTALS	13	2	15

Torop & Bokov both played in CSKA's 2-0 victory over Metallurg Lipetsk on 26 October 2021

=== Disciplinary record ===
Number	Nation	Position	Name	Premier League		Russian Cup		Total	
Number	Nation	Position	Name	Yellow card	Red card	Yellow card	Red card	Yellow card	Red card
2	(Russia)	DF	Mário Fernandes	5	0	0	0	5	0
3	(Brazil)	DF	Bruno Fuchs	0	1	1	0	1	1
6	(Russia)	MF	Maksim Mukhin	7	0	2	0	9	0
7	(Russia)	MF	Ilzat Akhmetov	1	1	0	0	1	1
8	(Colombia)	MF	Jorge Carrascal	4	0	1	0	5	0
10	(Russia)	MF	Alan Dzagoev	3	0	0	0	3	0
11	(Nigeria)	FW	Chidera Ejuke	2	0	0	0	2	0
14	(Russia)	DF	Kirill Nababkin	1	0	0	0	1	0
19	(Kazakhstan)	MF	Bakhtiyar Zaynutdinov	4	0	0	0	4	0
27	(Ivory Coast)	MF	Jean-Philippe Gbamin	4	0	2	1	6	1
29	(Slovenia)	MF	Jaka Bijol	1	0	0	0	1	0
35	(Russia)	GK	Igor Akinfeev	0	0	1	0	1	0
41	(Russia)	FW	Yegor Ushakov	1	0	0	0	1	0
42	(Russia)	DF	Georgi Shchennikov	3	0	1	0	4	0
46	(Russia)	FW	Vladislav Yakovlev	1	0	0	0	1	0
78	(Russia)	DF	Igor Diveyev	2	0	0	0	2	0
91	(Russia)	FW	Anton Zabolotny	3	1	1	0	4	1
97	(Turkey)	FW	Yusuf Yazıcı	2	0	0	0	2	0
98	(Russia)	MF	Ivan Oblyakov	4	0	0	0	4	0
Players away on loan:
20	(Russia)	MF	Konstantin Kuchayev	1	0	1	0	2	0
88	(Norway)	MF	Emil Bohinen	2	0	0	0	2	0
Players who left CSKA Moscow during the season:
22	(Russia)	MF	Konstantin Maradishvili	1	0	0	0	1	0
71	(Russia)	MF	Nair Tiknizyan	1	0	0	0	1	0
			TOTALS	53	3	10	1	63	4
