= Mário Fernandes =

Brazilian-born Russian footballer (born 1990)

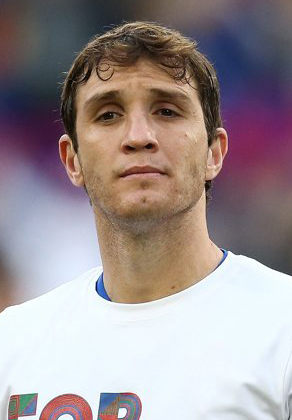
- Fernandes in 2022

Personal information
- Full name: Mário Figueira Fernandes
- Date of birth: 19 September 1990 (age 36)
- Place of birth: São Caetano do Sul, Brazil
- Height: 1.87 m (6 ft 2 in)
- Position: Right-back

Youth career
- 2006–2009: São Caetano
- 2009: Grêmio

Senior career*
| Years | Team | Apps | (Gls) |
| 2009–2012 | Grêmio | 87 | (3) |
| 2012–2022 | CSKA Moscow | 259 | (9) |
| 2023 | Internacional | 5 | (0) |
| 2023–2024 | Zenit Saint Petersburg | 12 | (0) |
| Total | | 363 | (12) |

International career^{‡}
| 2014 | Brazil | 1 | (0) |
| 2017–2021 | Russia | 33 | (5) |
- * Club domestic league appearances and goals as of 9 March 2024 ‡ National team caps and goals as of 1 September 2021

Mário Figueira Fernandes (Russian: Марио Фигейра Фернандес, pronounced [ˈmarʲɪo fʲɪˈɡʲejrə fʲɪrˈnandɨs]; born 19 September 1990) is a former professional footballer who played as a right-back. Fernandes was born in Brazil, but is a naturalised citizen of Russia and has played for both the Brazilian and Russian national teams.

== Club career ==
=== Grêmio ===
Fernandes joined Grêmio in March 2009, signing until 2014. A few days later, he disappeared, and Brazilian police were called in to search for him. He was found some days later at his uncles house in Jundiaí, after having withdrawn cash in Londrina, Porto Alegre and Florianópolis. Fernandes made his debut for the club against Sport on 28 June 2009. Fernandes established himself as Grêmio's first-choice right back.

=== CSKA Moscow ===
On 25 April 2012, the Grêmio president announced that a 15 million euro deal had been agreed with CSKA Moscow and Fernandes was set to join them pending a medical examination, with CSKA announcing the arrival on 4 May 2012.

During the 2013–14 campaign he suffered a knee injury ruling him out for the first four months of the season.

In 2015, he was a key player in the Champions League 3rd qualifying round – CSKA Moscow won the second leg against Sparta Prague 3–2. Fernandes played 90 minutes, after 64 minutes (2:2) and after a run of the mill challenge Fernandes made a simulated dive, referee Paolo Mazzoleni showed Marek Matějovský the red card. Russian daily Kommersant wrote it was "An important theatre piece". Czech newspapers claimed the play was certainly not card worthy and Fernandes lacked fair play.

On 29 June 2017, Fernandes signed a new contract with CSKA, keeping him at the club until the summer of 2022.

On 18 May 2022, Fernandes announced that he would be suspending his contract with CSKA following their last game of the 2021–22 season against Rostov on 21 May 2022 for personal reasons. On 11 December 2022, CSKA announced that Fernandes had decided to resume his playing career, whilst also remaining in Brazil for 2023.

=== Internacional ===
On 13 December 2022, Internacional announced the signing of Fernandes from CSKA Moscow for the 2023 season. CSKA Moscow announced the transfer as a year-long loan. In the summer of 2023 CSKA and Internacional negotiated about a transfer that would return Fernandes to CSKA, but the talks stalled due to CSKA's refusal to pay Internacional for the departed player – formally the move to Internacional was a permanent transfer, and not a loan per se.

=== Zenit ===
On 17 July 2023, Fernandes signed a one-year contract with Zenit St.Petersburg, with the option of an additional year. On 24 July 2024, Fernandes left Zenit by mutual agreement.

=== Retirement ===
On 19 September 2025, Fernandes announced his retirement from professional football in a post on social media.

== International career ==
=== Brazil ===
In 2011, Fernandes was called to the Brazil squad for the Superclásico de las Américas, but he missed his flight to the national team camp after spending the previous night at a nightclub in Porto Alegre. Fernandes went on to make his debut, and only appearance for Brazil in a 4–0 friendly victory against Japan on 14 October 2014.

=== Russia ===
After acquiring Russian citizenship, he was called up to the Russia national football team for the friendly games in 2016, against Turkey on 31 August and Ghana on 6 September. However, at that point, he had only been a CSKA Moscow player since April 2012, which meant he had not lived in Russia continuously for at least five years yet. Thus, he was not eligible to play for Russia until April 2017.

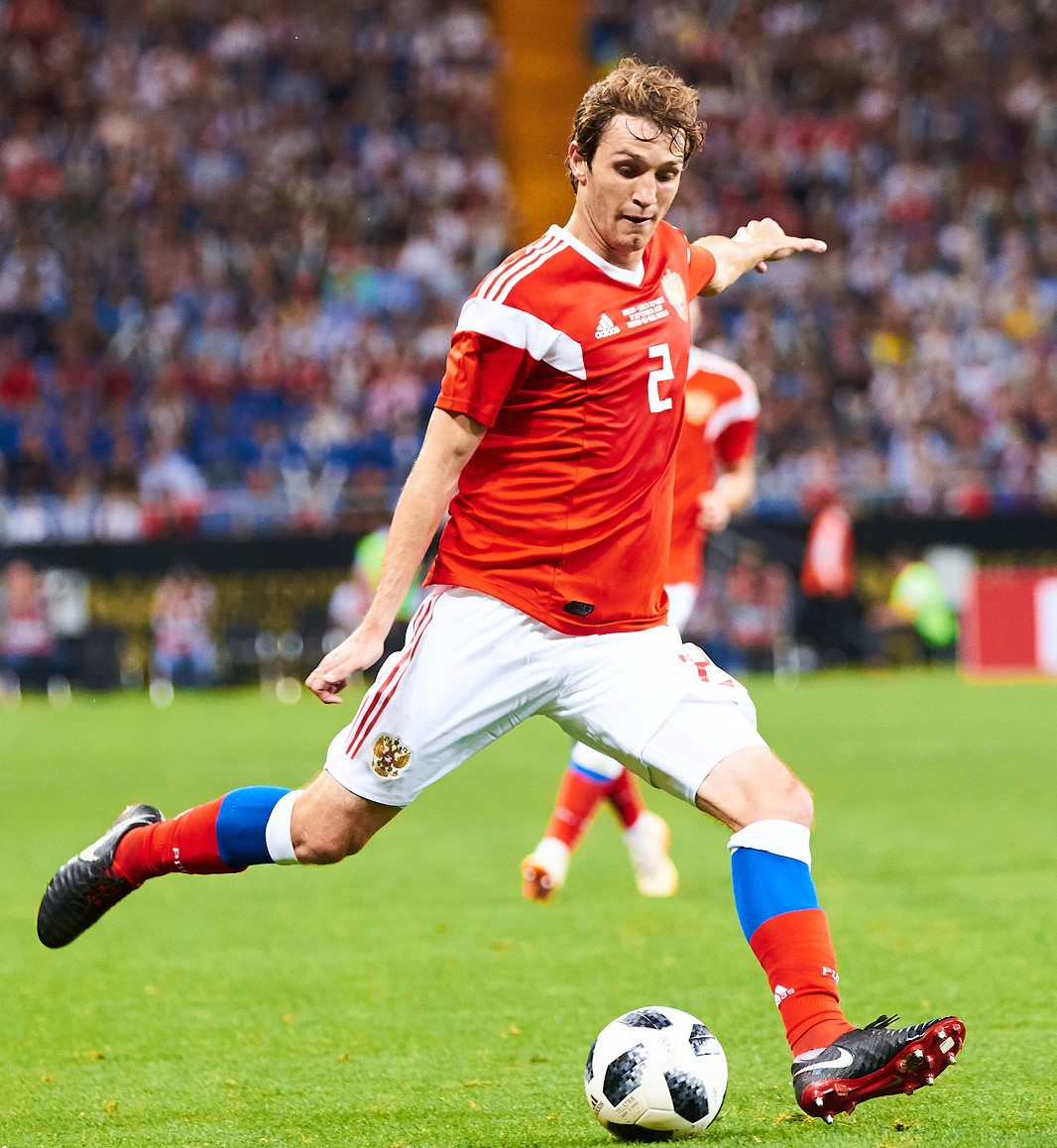
Fernandes playing for the Russia national football team

On 23 March 2017, it was announced that he would make his debut for Russia on 24 March in a friendly against Ivory Coast. He did not appear in that game. He made his debut for Russia on 7 October 2017 in a friendly game against South Korea.

On 11 May 2018, he was included in Russia's extended 2018 FIFA World Cup squad. On 3 June 2018, he was included in the finalized World Cup squad. He played a key role in Russia's performance at the 2018 FIFA World Cup. In the quarter finals against Croatia, he scored an equalising goal in extra time, which sent the match to a penalty shootout. However, Russia was eliminated after losing the shootout, where he missed his penalty.

On 11 May 2021, he was included in the preliminary extended 30-man squad for UEFA Euro 2020. On 2 June 2021, he was included in the final squad. He played the full match in Russia's opening game against Belgium on 12 June 2021 as Russia lost 0–3. He started the second group game against Finland but got injured and substituted in the 26th minute after landing awkwardly contesting an aerial ball. He recovered for the last group game against Denmark on 21 June and played a full game as Russia lost 1–4 and was eliminated.

On 13 September 2021, Fernandes announced his retirement from the national team.

== Personal life ==
Fernandes was born in São Paulo. Right after signing his first professional contract with Grêmio, Fernandes found it hard to adjust to a new home and fell into depression, prompting him to disappear to his uncle. The police found him in a dishevelled state nearly 700 miles away from Porto Alegre, hungry and exhausted. In a later interview he refused to disclose why he made no attempt to contact the club during this time, but pointed out the difficulties of settling at the beginning of a career, citing the example of Jesús Navas. He underwent psychotherapy to deal with his depression, which helped his performances, but still drank heavily, regularly went out clubbing, and neglected his diet and fitness, saying "I would drink so much that I would sometimes show up drunk to training". During this time he lived alone, and in an interview admitted to "eating pizza and McDonald's every day", which led to action on the part of the Gremio dietitian.

Fernandes had spoken with CSKA CEO Roman Babaev about the possibility of receiving Russian citizenship in 2015, before he had been called up to the Brazil squad. His talks about receiving Russian citizenship resumed in the autumn of the same year, at which point he had decided and had the full support of his family to do so. On 13 July 2016, he received Russian citizenship via presidential decree from Vladimir Putin, which according to him made him more determined to start for Russia in the World Cup. His younger brother, Jô, is also a footballer.

As of 2017, Fernandes spoke very little Russian, but stated his intent to learn the language and the national anthem.

== Career statistics ==
=== Club ===
As of match played 13 March 2024

Appearances and goals by club, season and competition
| Club | Season | League | | | National Cup | | Continental | | Other | | Total | |
| Club | Season | Division | Apps | Goals | Apps | Goals | Apps | Goals | Apps | Goals | Apps | Goals |
|---|---|---|---|---|---|---|---|---|---|---|---|---|
| Grêmio | 2009 | Série A | 19 | 0 | — | | 0 | 0 | 0 (Note: Appearances in Campeonato Gaúcho) | 0 | 19 | 0 |
| Grêmio | 2010 | Série A | 2 | 0 | 7 | 0 | — | | 16 | 1 | 25 | 1 |
| Grêmio | 2011 | Série A | 33 | 1 | — | | 3 (Note: Appearances in Copa Libertadores) | 0 | 12 | 1 | 48 | 2 |
| Grêmio | 2012 | Série A | 0 | 0 | 0 | 0 | — | | 5 | 0 | 5 | 0 |
| Grêmio | Total | | 54 | 1 | 7 | 0 | 3 | 0 | 33 | 2 | 97 | 3 |
| CSKA Moscow | 2012–13 | Russian Premier League | 28 | 0 | 3 | 0 | 2 (Note: Appearances in UEFA Europa League) | 0 | — | | 33 | 0 |
| CSKA Moscow | 2013–14 | Russian Premier League | 12 | 0 | 3 | 1 | 0 (Note: Appearances in UEFA Champions League) | 0 | 0 (Note: Appearances in Russian Super Cup) | 0 | 15 | 1 |
| CSKA Moscow | 2014–15 | Russian Premier League | 29 | 0 | 3 | 0 | 6 | 0 | 1 | 0 | 39 | 0 |
| CSKA Moscow | 2015–16 | Russian Premier League | 27 | 1 | 5 | 0 | 9 | 0 | — | | 41 | 1 |
| CSKA Moscow | 2016–17 | Russian Premier League | 30 | 0 | 0 | 0 | 5 | 0 | 1 | 0 | 36 | 0 |
| CSKA Moscow | 2017–18 | Russian Premier League | 25 | 0 | 0 | 0 | 12 (Note: Ten appearances in the UEFA Champions League, two appearances in the UEFA Europa League) | 0 | — | | 37 | 0 |
| CSKA Moscow | 2018–19 | Russian Premier League | 28 | 1 | 0 | 0 | 6 | 0 | 1 | 0 | 35 | 1 |
| CSKA Moscow | 2019–20 | Russian Premier League | 29 | 3 | 1 | 0 | 6 | 0 | — | | 36 | 3 |
| CSKA Moscow | 2020–21 | Russian Premier League | 23 | 1 | 2 | 1 | 2 | 0 | — | | 27 | 2 |
| CSKA Moscow | 2021–22 | Russian Premier League | 28 | 3 | 2 | 0 | — | | — | | 30 | 3 |
| CSKA Moscow | Total | | 259 | 9 | 19 | 2 | 48 | 0 | 3 | 0 | 329 | 11 |
| Internacional | 2023 | Série A | 0 | 0 | 0 | 0 | 0 | 0 | 5 | 0 | 5 | 0 |
| Zenit Saint Petersburg | 2023–24 | Russian Premier League | 12 | 0 | 6 | 0 | — | | — | | 18 | 0 |
| Career total | | | 325 | 10 | 32 | 2 | 51 | 0 | 41 | 2 | 449 | 14 |

=== International ===
Appearances and goals by national team and year

As of 1 September 2021

Appearances and goals by club, season and competition
| National team | Year | Apps | Goals |
|---|---|---|---|
| Brazil | 2014 | 1 | 0 |
| Brazil | Total | 1 | 0 |
| Russia | 2017 | 3 | 0 |
| Russia | 2018 | 11 | 1 |
| Russia | 2019 | 8 | 1 |
| Russia | 2020 | 3 | 1 |
| Russia | 2021 | 8 | 2 |
| Russia | Total | 33 | 5 |
| Career total | | 34 | 5 |

As of match played 30 March 2021. Russia score listed first, score column indicates score after each Fernandes goal.

List of international goals scored by Mário Fernandes
| No. | Date | Venue | Cap | Opponent | Score | Result | Competition |
|---|---|---|---|---|---|---|---|
| 1 | 7 July 2018 | Fisht Olympic Stadium, Sochi, Russia | 10 | Croatia | 2–2 | 2–2 (3–4 p) | 2018 FIFA World Cup |
| 2 | 9 September 2019 | Kaliningrad Stadium, Kaliningrad, Russia | 20 | Kazakhstan | 1–0 | 1–0 | UEFA Euro 2020 qualification |
| 3 | 6 September 2020 | Puskás Aréna, Budapest, Hungary | 24 | Hungary | 3–0 | 3–2 | 2020–21 UEFA Nations League B |
| 4 | 24 March 2021 | National Stadium, Ta' Qali, Malta | 26 | Malta | 2–0 | 3–1 | 2022 FIFA World Cup qualification |
| 5 | 30 March 2021 | Anton Malatinský Stadium, Trnava, Slovakia | 28 | Slovakia | 1–1 | 1–2 | 2022 FIFA World Cup qualification |

== Honours ==
Grêmio

- Campeonato Gaúcho: 2010

CSKA Moscow

- Russian Premier League: 2012–13, 2013–14, 2015–16
- Russian Cup: 2012–13
- Russian Super Cup: 2014, 2018

Zenit Saint Petersburg

- Russian Premier League: 2023–24
- Russian Cup: 2023–24

Individual

- Silver Ball: 2011
- Campeonato Gaúcho Team of the Championship: 2010
- CSKA Fans' Player of the Year: 2018–19
- Russian Premier League Right back of the Year: 2013–14, 2014–15, 2016–17, 2018–19, 2020–21, 2021–22
